= List of Azerbaijan football transfers summer 2017 =

This is a list of Azerbaijan football transfers in the summer transfer window, 9 June - 31 August 2017, by club. Only clubs of the 2017–18 Azerbaijan Premier League are included.

== Azerbaijan Premier League 2017-18 ==
=== Gabala ===
In: Note: Flags indicate national team as defined under FIFA eligibility rules; some limited exceptions apply. Players may hold more than one non-FIFA nationality.

No.	Pos.	Nation	Player
6	MF	AZE	Elvin Mammadov (from (Azerbaijan) Zira)
7	MF	AZE	Alen Askerov (from (Croatia) Novigrad)
12	MF	SCO	Andy Halliday (loan from (Scotland) Rangers)
16	DF	NED	Dion Malone (from (Netherlands) ADO Den Haag)
18	MF	AZE	Ilgar Gurbanov (from (Azerbaijan) Qarabağ)
20	MF	ESP	Javi Hernández (from (Poland) Górnik Łęczna)
21	DF	NED	Dave Bulthuis (from (Germany) 1. FC Nürnberg)
23	GK	AZE	Agil Mammadov (from (Azerbaijan) AZAL)
28	FW	FRA	Steeven Joseph-Monrose (from (France) Stade Brest)
45	FW	MLI	Famoussa Koné (loan from (Turkey) Göztepe)
90	FW	NGA	Ekigho Ehiosun (from (Turkey) Gazişehir Gaziantep)

Out: Note: Flags indicate national team as defined under FIFA eligibility rules; some limited exceptions apply. Players may hold more than one non-FIFA nationality.

No.	Pos.	Nation	Player
2	DF	AZE	Sahil Mirzayev (to (Azerbaijan) Səbail)
6	MF	AZE	Rashad Sadiqov (to (Azerbaijan) Zira)
7	MF	GEO	Nika Kvekveskiri (to (Kazakhstan) Tobol)
7	MF	AZE	Araz Abdullayev (loan to (Cyprus) Anorthosis)
9	FW	EST	Sergei Zenjov (to (Poland) Cracovia)
13	DF	AZE	Murad Musayev (to (Azerbaijan) Səbail)
17	DF	AZE	Magomed Mirzabekov (to (Azerbaijan) Neftchi Baku)
20	DF	BRA	Ricardinho (to (England) Oxford United)
20	DF	ESP	Javi Hernández (to (Poland) Cracovia)
27	MF	LBR	Theo Weeks (loan return to (Cyprus) Ermis Aradippou)
31	FW	SUI	Danijel Subotić (to (South Korea) Ulsan Hyundai)
32	FW	AZE	Rashad Eyyubov (to (Azerbaijan) Sumgayit)
33	GK	POL	Dawid Pietrzkiewicz (to (Poland) Sandecja Nowy Sącz)
36	GK	AZE	Suleyman Suleymanov (to (Azerbaijan) Sumgayit)
44	DF	BRA	Rafael Santos
74	DF	AZE	Yusif Nabiyev (loan to (Azerbaijan) Zira, previously on loan to (Azerbaijan) Sumgayit)
77	MF	AZE	Farid Nabiyev (to (Czech Republic) Slavia Prague)
90	FW	UKR	Ramil Hasanov (on loan to (Azerbaijan) Sumgayit)

=== Inter Baku ===
In: Note: Flags indicate national team as defined under FIFA eligibility rules; some limited exceptions apply. Players may hold more than one non-FIFA nationality.

No.	Pos.	Nation	Player

Out: Note: Flags indicate national team as defined under FIFA eligibility rules; some limited exceptions apply. Players may hold more than one non-FIFA nationality.

No.	Pos.	Nation	Player
1	GK	AZE	Salahat Aghayev (to (Azerbaijan) Neftchi Baku)
11	FW	AZE	Rauf Aliyev (to (Albania) Kukësi)
14	DF	GEO	Zurab Khizanishvili (Retired)
17	DF	AZE	Abbas Huseynov (to (Azerbaijan) Qarabağ)
45	FW	AZE	Ilkin Sadigov (to (Azerbaijan) Turan-Tovuz)

=== Kapaz ===
In: Note: Flags indicate national team as defined under FIFA eligibility rules; some limited exceptions apply. Players may hold more than one non-FIFA nationality.

No.	Pos.	Nation	Player
3	DF	BRA	Dedimar Ferreira (from (Brazil) Rio Negro)
7	MF	AZE	Sergey Chernyshev (from (Azerbaijan) Sumgayit)
8	FW	NGA	Victor Lucky Oseghale (from (Malta) Mosta)
9	FW	AZE	İlkin Sadigov (from (Azerbaijan) Turan-Tovuz)
11	MF	AZE	Kamran Abdullazade (from (Azerbaijan) Sumgayit)
12	DF	AZE	Ilyas Safarzade (from (Azerbaijan) AZAL)
16	MF	AZE	Azer Mammadov (from (Azerbaijan) Turan-Tovuz)
18	MF	AZE	Tural Jalilov (from (Azerbaijan) Zira)
19	FW	AZE	Aydin Gasimov (from (Azerbaijan) AZAL)
20	MF	MLI	Samba Diallo (from (Morocco) Mouloudia d'Oujda)
22	GK	AZE	Ruzi Giyasli (from (Azerbaijan) Neftchi Baku)
24	FW	AZE	Magomed Kurbanov (from (Azerbaijan) Sumgayit)

Out: Note: Flags indicate national team as defined under FIFA eligibility rules; some limited exceptions apply. Players may hold more than one non-FIFA nationality.

No.	Pos.	Nation	Player
1	GK	AZE	Eyyub Aliyev (to (Sweden) Ljungskile)
7	DF	AZE	Vugar Beybalayev (to (Azerbaijan) Sumgayit)
9	FW	AZE	Tural Gurbatov (to (Turkey) Atakum Belediyyespor)
10	FW	BRA	Dário (to (South Korea) Seongnam)
17	MF	AZE	Nijat Gurbanov (to (Azerbaijan) Zira)
18	DF	AZE	Tural Akhundov (to (Azerbaijan) Sumgayit)
19	MF	AZE	Orkhan Aliyev (to (Azerbaijan) Zira)
23	DF	AZE	Tural Narimanov (to (Azerbaijan) Shuvalan)
36	DF	BRA	Renan (to (Serbia) Vojvodina)
77	MF	POR	Serginho (to (Portugal) Trofense)
88	GK	LTU	Tadas Simaitis (to (Lithuania) Jonava)
90	FW	CMR	Julien Ebah (to (Qatar) Al-Khor)

=== Neftchi Baku ===
In: Note: Flags indicate national team as defined under FIFA eligibility rules; some limited exceptions apply. Players may hold more than one non-FIFA nationality.

No.	Pos.	Nation	Player
1	GK	AZE	Salahat Aghayev (from (Azerbaijan) Inter Baku)
3	DF	CRO	Mateo Mužek (from (Slovenia) Rudar Velenje)
6	MF	AZE	Rashad Sadiqov (from (Azerbaijan) Zira)
8	MF	AZE	Emin Makhmudov (from (Portugal) Boavista)
10	MF	PAR	David Meza Colli (Free agent)
21	DF	AZE	Magomed Mirzabekov (from (Azerbaijan) Gabala)
22	FW	AZE	Mirabdulla Abbasov (loan return from (Azerbaijan) Sumgayit)
94	GK	AZE	Rashad Azizli (from (Azerbaijan) Səbail)
97	FW	AZE	Elnur Jafarov (from (Croatia) Dugopolje)

Out: Note: Flags indicate national team as defined under FIFA eligibility rules; some limited exceptions apply. Players may hold more than one non-FIFA nationality.

No.	Pos.	Nation	Player
3	DF	BRA	Jairo (to (Iran) Sepahan)
8	MF	CZE	Zdeněk Folprecht (loan return to (Czech Republic) Slovan Liberec)
10	MF	AZE	Javid Imamverdiyev (to (Azerbaijan) Sumgayit)
13	MF	AZE	Murad Agayev (to (Azerbaijan) Səbail)
22	DF	AZE	Mahir Shukurov (Retired)
26	DF	AZE	Kamal Gurbanov (to (Azerbaijan) Səbail)
29	DF	GEO	Giorgi Navalovski (to (Russia) SKA-Khabarovsk)
33	GK	MNE	Boban Bajković
61	DF	AZE	Tayyar Mammadov (loan to (Azerbaijan) Səbail)
80	MF	VEN	Edson Castillo (loan to (Venezuela) Mineros)
88	MF	AZE	Orkhan Gurbanli (loan to (Azerbaijan) Səbail)
95	DF	AZE	Elvin Badalov (to (Austria) Karabakh Wien)
—	GK	AZE	Ruzi Giyasli (to (Azerbaijan) Kapaz)
—	DF	AZE	Eltun Yagublu (to (Azerbaijan) Səbail, previously on loan)
—	MF	AZE	Parviz Garakhanov (to (Azerbaijan) Səbail)
—	MF	AZE	Pilagha Mehdiyev (to (Azerbaijan) Qarabağ)

=== Qarabağ ===
In: Note: Flags indicate national team as defined under FIFA eligibility rules; some limited exceptions apply. Players may hold more than one non-FIFA nationality.

No.	Pos.	Nation	Player
1	GK	UKR	Anton Kanibolotskiy (from (Ukraine) Shakhtar Donetsk)
10	MF	BRA	Pedro Henrique (loan from (Greece) PAOK)
18	FW	NOR	Tarik Elyounoussi (loan from (Greece) Olympiacos)
30	DF	AZE	Abbas Huseynov (from (Azerbaijan) Inter Baku)
52	DF	POL	Jakub Rzeźniczak (from (Poland) Legia Warsaw)
77	MF	HAI	Wilde-Donald Guerrier (from (Turkey) Alanyaspor)
84	FW	UKR	Yaroslav Deda (from (Ukraine) Volyn Lutsk)
90	FW	AZE	Ramil Sheydayev (loan from (Turkey) Trabzonspor)

Out: Note: Flags indicate national team as defined under FIFA eligibility rules; some limited exceptions apply. Players may hold more than one non-FIFA nationality.

No.	Pos.	Nation	Player
1	GK	SRB	Bojan Šaranov (to (Serbia) Zemun)
10	MF	MKD	Muarem Muarem (to (Kazakhstan) Aktobe)
18	MF	AZE	Ilgar Gurbanov (to (Azerbaijan) Gabala)
64	GK	AZE	Emil Balayev (to (Azerbaijan) Səbail, previously on loan)
71	FW	AZE	Vüqar Nadirov (to (Azerbaijan) Səbail)
—	DF	AZE	Azer Salahli (to (Azerbaijan) Sumgayit, previously on loan)
—	MF	AZE	Vugar Mustafayev (to (Azerbaijan) Zira, previously on loan)

=== Sabail ===
In: Note: Flags indicate national team as defined under FIFA eligibility rules; some limited exceptions apply. Players may hold more than one non-FIFA nationality.

No.	Pos.	Nation	Player
1	GK	AZE	Emil Balayev (from (Azerbaijan) Qarabağ, previously on loan)
2	DF	AZE	Sahil Mirzayev (from (Azerbaijan) Gabala)
3	DF	GEO	Tamaz Tsetskhladze (from (Georgia (country)) Gardabani)
4	MF	AZE	Amit Guluzade (from (Greece) AE Larissa)
5	MF	AZE	Seymur Asadov (from (Azerbaijan) Sumgayit)
6	MF	AZE	Murad Agayev (from (Azerbaijan) Neftchi Baku)
7	MF	AZE	Emin Mehdiyev (from (Azerbaijan) Sumgayit)
8	MF	AZE	Agshin Mukhtaroglu (from (Azerbaijan) Turan-Tovuz)
9	FW	AZE	Raul Yagubzade (from (Azerbaijan) Baku)
10	FW	AZE	Nurlan Novruzov (from (Azerbaijan) Zira)
11	MF	TKM	Elman Tagayev (from (Turkmenistan) Altyn Asyr)
13	DF	AZE	Murad Musayev (from (Azerbaijan) Gabala)
14	DF	AZE	Yamin Agakerimzade (from (Azerbaijan) Zira)
17	FW	AZE	Vüqar Nadirov (from (Azerbaijan) Qarabağ)
18	MF	ROU	Alexandru Popovici (from (Romania) Poli Timișoara)
20	DF	AZE	Eltun Yagublu (from (Azerbaijan) Neftchi Baku)
23	DF	CUW	Ayrton Statie (from (Netherlands) Oss)
25	GK	AZE	Elkhan Ahmadov (from (Azerbaijan) Mil-Muğan)
26	DF	AZE	Kamal Gurbanov (from (Azerbaijan) Neftchi Baku)
35	DF	LTU	Edgaras Žarskis (from (Lithuania) Atlantas)
66	MF	AZE	Parviz Garakhanov (from (Azerbaijan) Neftchi Baku)
69	FW	BRA	Renan Telles (from (Malta) Hibernians)
77	DF	AZE	Tayyar Mammadov (loan from (Azerbaijan) Neftchi Baku)
88	MF	AZE	Orkhan Gurbanli (loan from (Azerbaijan) Neftchi Baku)
99	DF	GNB	Maudo Jarjué (from (Portugal) Gil Vicente)

Out: Note: Flags indicate national team as defined under FIFA eligibility rules; some limited exceptions apply. Players may hold more than one non-FIFA nationality.

No.	Pos.	Nation	Player
1	GK	AZE	Rashad Azizli (to (Azerbaijan) Neftchi Baku)

=== Sumgayit ===
In: Note: Flags indicate national team as defined under FIFA eligibility rules; some limited exceptions apply. Players may hold more than one non-FIFA nationality.

No.	Pos.	Nation	Player
5	DF	AZE	Vugar Beybalayev (from (Azerbaijan) Kapaz)
6	MF	AZE	Kamal Mirzayev (from (Azerbaijan) Kapaz)
7	MF	AZE	Javid Taghiyev (from (Azerbaijan) Zira)
10	MF	AZE	Javid Imamverdiyev (from (Azerbaijan) Neftchi Baku)
11	MF	AZE	Ehtiram Shahverdiyev (loan extended from (Azerbaijan) Gabala)
18	DF	AZE	Tural Akhundov (from (Azerbaijan) Kapaz)
19	DF	AZE	Azer Salahli (Qarabağ (Azerbaijan) Qarabağ, previously on loan)
32	FW	AZE	Rashad Eyyubov (from (Azerbaijan) Gabala)
36	GK	AZE	Suleyman Suleymanov (from (Azerbaijan) Gabala)
38	MF	AZE	Mushfig Rzayev (from (Russia) Solyaris Moscow)
90	FW	UKR	Ramil Hasanov (on loan from (Azerbaijan) Gabala)

Out: Note: Flags indicate national team as defined under FIFA eligibility rules; some limited exceptions apply. Players may hold more than one non-FIFA nationality.

No.	Pos.	Nation	Player
5	MF	AZE	Seymur Asadov (to (Azerbaijan) Səbail)
6	DF	AZE	Mikayil Rahimov (to (Azerbaijan) Qaradağ Lökbatan)
7	MF	AZE	Sergey Chernyshev (to (Azerbaijan) Kapaz)
10	FW	AZE	Magomed Kurbanov (to (Azerbaijan) Kapaz)
18	MF	AZE	Suleyman Ahmadov (to (Azerbaijan) Qarabağ)
19	DF	AZE	Azer Salahli (loan return to (Azerbaijan) Qarabağ)
20	MF	RUS	Farkhad Gystarov (to (Russia) Mashuk-KMV)
21	MF	RUS	Nasyr Abilayev (to (Russia) Anzhi Makhachkala)
22	FW	AZE	Mirabdulla Abbasov (loan return to (Azerbaijan) Neftchi Baku)
23	MF	AZE	Ilgar Huseynov (to (Azerbaijan) Mil-Muğan)
25	MF	AZE	Ayaz Mehdiyev (to (Azerbaijan) MOIK Baku)
28	MF	AZE	Emin Mehdiyev (to (Azerbaijan) Səbail)
42	MF	AZE	Kamran Abdullzade (to (Azerbaijan) Kapaz)
74	DF	AZE	Yusif Nabiyev (loan return to (Azerbaijan) Gabala)
77	MF	AZE	Ehtiram Shahverdiyev (loan return to (Azerbaijan) Gabala)
94	GK	AZE	Tarlan Ahmadli (to (Azerbaijan) Shuvalan)

=== Zira ===
In: Note: Flags indicate national team as defined under FIFA eligibility rules; some limited exceptions apply. Players may hold more than one non-FIFA nationality.

No.	Pos.	Nation	Player
3	DF	CMR	Joseph Boum (Free agent)
4	MF	AZE	Vugar Mustafayev (from (Azerbaijan) Qarabağ, previously on loan)
6	MF	AZE	Rashad Sadiqov (from (Azerbaijan) Gabala)
7	MF	MLI	Sadio Tounkara (from (Azerbaijan) AZAL)
9	FW	CTA	David Manga (from (Israel) Hapoel Ashkelon)
10	MF	AZE	Orkhan Aliyev (from (Azerbaijan) Kapaz)
10	FW	HAI	Kervens Belfort (from (Sweden) Syrianska)
14	DF	ROU	Gabriel Matei (from (Poland) Górnik Łęczna)
43	FW	GHA	Richard Gadze (from (India) Delhi Dynamos, previously on loan)
74	DF	AZE	Yusif Nabiyev (loan from (Azerbaijan) Gabala)
99	MF	AZE	Nijat Gurbanov (from (Azerbaijan) Kapaz)

Out: Note: Flags indicate national team as defined under FIFA eligibility rules; some limited exceptions apply. Players may hold more than one non-FIFA nationality.

No.	Pos.	Nation	Player
6	MF	AZE	Rashad Sadiqov (to (Azerbaijan) Neftchi Baku)
7	MF	FRA	Ben Sangaré
10	MF	AZE	Elvin Mammadov (to (Azerbaijan) Gabala)
10	FW	HAI	Kervens Belfort (to (India) Jamshedpur)
12	GK	AZE	Shamo Hasanov (to (Azerbaijan) Ağsu)
14	FW	AZE	Nurlan Novruzov (to (Azerbaijan) Səbail)
16	MF	NGA	Akeem Latifu (to (Hungary) Budapest Honvéd)
18	MF	AZE	Tural Jalilov (to (Azerbaijan) Kapaz)
20	MF	PAR	César Meza Colli
26	MF	GEO	Giorgi Gorozia (to (Georgia (country)) Locomotive Tbilisi)
44	DF	POR	Miguel Lourenço (loan return to (Portugal) Vitória de Setúbal)
77	DF	AZE	Yamin Agakerimzade (to (Azerbaijan) Səbail)
92	MF	AZE	Javid Taghiyev (to (Azerbaijan) Sumgayit)
