= 2017–18 FK Səbail season =

Səbail
2017-18 season
- Manager: Samir Aliyev
- Stadium: Bayil Stadium
- Premier League: 7th
- Azerbaijan Cup: Quarterfinal vs Gabala
- Top goalscorer: League: Two Players (3); All: Three Players (3)

The Səbail FK 2017-18 season was Səbail's first Azerbaijan Premier League season, and their second season in existence.

== Squad ==
As of 13 February 2018

Note: Flags indicate national team as defined under FIFA eligibility rules; some limited exceptions apply. Players may hold more than one non-FIFA nationality.

No.	Pos.	Nation	Player
1	GK	AZE	Emil Balayev
2	MF	AZE	Sahil Mirzayev
3	DF	GEO	Tamaz Tsetskhladze
4	DF	AZE	Rahil Mammadov
5	DF	AZE	Karim Diniyev
6	MF	AZE	Murad Agayev
7	MF	AZE	Fahmin Muradbayli (loan from Neftchi Baku)
8	MF	AZE	Agshin Mukhtaroglu
10	FW	AZE	Nurlan Novruzov
11	MF	TKM	Elman Tagaýew
13	MF	UGA	Farouk Miya (loan from Standard Liège)
15	DF	GEO	Nika Apakidze
17	FW	AZE	Vüqar Nadirov

No.	Pos.	Nation	Player
18	MF	AZE	Agshin Gurbanli
20	DF	AZE	Eltun Yagublu
21	MF	AZE	Murtuzali Abakarov
22	GK	IRI	Amirhossein Najafi
23	DF	CUW	Ayrton Statie
24	DF	AZE	Ruslan Amirjanov
25	GK	AZE	Elkhan Ahmadov
26	DF	AZE	Kamal Gurbanov
29	MF	MDA	Eugeniu Cociuc (loan from Žilina)
66	MF	AZE	Parviz Garakhanov
88	MF	AZE	Orkhan Gurbanli (loan from Neftchi Baku)
92	FW	TKM	Wahyt Orazsähedow
99	DF	GBS	Maudo Jarjué

=== Out on loan ===
Note: Flags indicate national team as defined under FIFA eligibility rules; some limited exceptions apply. Players may hold more than one non-FIFA nationality.

No.	Pos.	Nation	Player
—	MF	AZE	Seymur Asadov (at Sabah)
—	MF	AZE	Tanriverdi Maharramli (at Khazar Baku)

No.	Pos.	Nation	Player
—	MF	AZE	Emin Mehdiyev (at Sabah)
—	FW	AZE	Raul Yagubzade (at Sabah)

== Transfers ==
=== Summer ===
In: Note: Flags indicate national team as defined under FIFA eligibility rules; some limited exceptions apply. Players may hold more than one non-FIFA nationality.

No.	Pos.	Nation	Player
1	GK	AZE	Emil Balayev (from (Azerbaijan) Qarabağ, previously on loan)
3	DF	GEO	Tamaz Tsetskhladze (from (Georgia (country)) Gardabani)
4	MF	AZE	Amit Guluzade (from (Greece) AE Larissa)
5	MF	AZE	Seymur Asadov (from (Azerbaijan) Sumgayit)
6	MF	AZE	Murad Agayev (from (Azerbaijan) Neftchi Baku)
7	FW	AZE	Emin Mehdiyev (from (Azerbaijan) Sumgayit)
8	MF	AZE	Agshin Mukhtaroglu (from (Azerbaijan) Turan-Tovuz)
9	FW	AZE	Raul Yagubzade (from (Azerbaijan) Baku)
10	FW	AZE	Nurlan Novruzov (from (Azerbaijan) Zira)
11	MF	TKM	Elman Tagaýew (from (Turkmenistan) Altyn Asyr)
13	DF	AZE	Murad Musayev (from (Azerbaijan) Gabala)
14	DF	AZE	Yamin Agakerimzade (from (Azerbaijan) Zira)
17	FW	AZE	Vüqar Nadirov (from (Azerbaijan) Qarabağ)
18	MF	ROU	Alexandru Popovici (from (Romania) Poli Timișoara)
20	DF	AZE	Eltun Yagublu (from (Azerbaijan) Neftchi Baku)
22	GK	IRI	Amirhossein Najafi (from (Iran) Sardar Bukan)
23	DF	CUW	Ayrton Statie (from (Netherlands) Oss)
25	GK	AZE	Elkhan Ahmadov (from (Azerbaijan) Mil-Muğan)
26	DF	AZE	Kamal Gurbanov (from (Azerbaijan) Neftchi Baku)
35	DF	LTU	Edgaras Žarskis (from (Lithuania) Atlantas)
66	MF	AZE	Parviz Garakhanov (from (Azerbaijan) Neftchi Baku)
69	FW	BRA	Renan Telles (from (Malta) Hibernians)
77	DF	AZE	Tayyar Mammadov (loan from (Azerbaijan) Neftchi Baku)
88	MF	AZE	Orkhan Gurbanli (loan from (Azerbaijan) Neftchi Baku)
99	DF	GBS	Maudo Jarjué (from (Portugal) Gil Vicente)
—	MF	AZE	Agshin Gurbanli (loan from (Azerbaijan) Neftchi Baku)

Out: Note: Flags indicate national team as defined under FIFA eligibility rules; some limited exceptions apply. Players may hold more than one non-FIFA nationality.

No.	Pos.	Nation	Player
—	GK	AZE	Rashad Azizli (to (Azerbaijan) Neftchi Baku)
—	DF	RUS	Gvanzav Mahammadov (to (Russia) Znamya Truda Orekhovo-Zuyevo)
—	DF	AZE	Saşa Yunisoğlu (to (Azerbaijan) Goicha)
—	MF	AZE	Ramazan Abbasov
—	MF	AZE	Mirzaga Huseynpur

=== Winter ===
In: Note: Flags indicate national team as defined under FIFA eligibility rules; some limited exceptions apply. Players may hold more than one non-FIFA nationality.

No.	Pos.	Nation	Player
4	DF	AZE	Rahil Mammadov (to (Azerbaijan) Sabail)
5	DF	AZE	Karim Diniyev (from (Azerbaijan) Kapaz)
7	MF	AZE	Fahmin Muradbayli (loan from (Azerbaijan) Neftchi Baku)
13	MF	UGA	Farouk Miya (loan from (Belgium) Standard Liège)
15	DF	GEO	Nika Apakidze (from (Georgia (country)) Rustavi)
18	MF	AZE	Agshin Gurbanli (from (Azerbaijan) Neftçi)
24	DF	AZE	Ruslan Amirjanov
29	MF	MDA	Eugeniu Cociuc (loan from (Slovakia) Žilina)
92	FW	TKM	Wahyt Orazsähedow (from (Turkmenistan) Ahal)

Out: Note: Flags indicate national team as defined under FIFA eligibility rules; some limited exceptions apply. Players may hold more than one non-FIFA nationality.

No.	Pos.	Nation	Player
5	MF	AZE	Seymur Asadov (loan to (Azerbaijan) Sabah)
7	MF	AZE	Emin Mehdiyev (loan to (Azerbaijan) Sabah)
9	FW	AZE	Raul Yagubzade (loan to (Azerbaijan) Sabah)
13	DF	AZE	Murad Musayev (to (Azerbaijan) Shuvalan)
18	MF	ROU	Alexandru Popovici (to (Romania) Poli Timișoara)
55	MF	AZE	Tanriverdi Maharramli (loan to (Azerbaijan) Khazar Baku)
77	DF	AZE	Tayyar Mammadov (loan return to (Azerbaijan) Neftchi Baku)

=== Released ===
Date	Position	Nationality	Name	Joined	Date
17 December 2017	DF	(Lithuania)	Edgaras Žarskis	Bytovia Bytów	27 February 2018
19 December 2017	MF	(Azerbaijan)	Amit Guluzade	Drita	23 January 2018
25 December 2017	DF	(Azerbaijan)	Yamin Agakerimzade		
31 December 2017	MF	(Brazil)	Renan Telles		
2 June 2018	DF	(Azerbaijan)	Karim Diniyev	Sabah	
2 June 2018	DF	(Azerbaijan)	Ruslan Amirjanov	Keşla	30 August 2018
2 June 2018	DF	(Curaçao)	Ayrton Statie	Lienden	
2 June 2018	DF	(Georgia (country))	Nika Apakidze	Telavi	
2 June 2018	MF	(Azerbaijan)	Murad Agayev		
2 June 2018	MF	(Azerbaijan)	Seymur Asadov		
2 June 2018	MF	(Azerbaijan)	Agshin Mukhtaroglu		
2 June 2018	MF	(Azerbaijan)	Parviz Garakhanov		
2 June 2018	MF	(Azerbaijan)	Emin Mehdiyev	Qaradağ Lökbatan	
2 June 2018	MF	(Turkmenistan)	Elman Tagaýew	Navbahor Namangan	
2 June 2018	FW	(Azerbaijan)	Vüqar Nadirov		
2 June 2018	FW	(Azerbaijan)	Nurlan Novruzov	Dersim 62 Spor	
2 June 2018	FW	(Azerbaijan)	Raul Yagubzade	MOIK Baku	
2 June 2018	FW	(Turkmenistan)	Wahyt Orazsähedow	Altyn Asyr	

== Friendlies ==
2 July 2017	Sumgayit (Azerbaijan)	2 – 2	(Azerbaijan) Səbail	Azerbaijan
AZT (UTC+4)	Hasanov		Mehdiyev; Mammodov	Stadium: Kapital Bank Arena

13 July 2017	Oman U-23	0 – 0	(Azerbaijan) Səbail	Turkey
16:30 AZT (UTC+4)		Report

15 July 2017	Al-Nassr (Saudi Arabia)	–	(Azerbaijan) Səbail	Turkey
AZT (UTC+4)		Report

20 July 2017	Al-Ittifaq (Saudi Arabia)	4 – 1	(Azerbaijan) Səbail	Turkey
16:30 AZT (UTC+4)	Goal	Report	Agayev

23 July 2017	Pakhtakor (Uzbekistan)	4 – 1	(Azerbaijan) Səbail	Turkey
16:30 AZT (UTC+4)	Goal	Report	N.Novruzov

26 July 2017	Al-Raed (Saudi Arabia)	–	(Azerbaijan) Səbail	Turkey
AZT (UTC+4)

12 November 2017	Gabala	1 – 1	Səbail	Baku
AZT (UTC+4)	K.Penan 45'	Report	Popovici 70'	Stadium: Ismat Gayibov Stadium

15 January 2018	Səbail	3 – 1	Khazar Baku	Baku
AZT (UTC+4)	K.Diniyev; Tagaýew	Report	F.Samadzade

23 January 2018	Səbail (Azerbaijan)	0 – 0	(Ukraine) Chornomorets Odesa	Antalya, Turkey
AZT (UTC+4)		Report

26 January 2018	Səbail (Azerbaijan)	1 – 1	(Serbia) Napredak Kruševac	Antalya, Turkey
AZT (UTC+4)	Goal	Report	Goal

29 January 2018	Səbail (Azerbaijan)	1 – 3	(Bulgaria) Lokomotiv Plovdiv	Antalya, Turkey
AZT (UTC+4)	Nadirov	Report	Goal

1 February 2018	Səbail (Azerbaijan)	2 – 2	(Slovakia) Senica	Antalya, Turkey
16:00 AZT (UTC+4)		Report

== Competitions ==
=== Overview ===
Competition	First match	Last match	Starting round	Final position	Record							
Competition	First match	Last match	Starting round	Final position	Pld	W	D	L	GF	GA	GD	Win %
Premier League	13 August 2017	20 May 2018	Matchday 1	7th	28	6	5	17	19	39	−20	21.43
Azerbaijan Cup	29 November 2017	15 December 2017	Second Round	Quarterfinal	3	1	0	2	4	5	−1	33.33
Total					31	7	5	19	23	44	−21	22.58

Last updated: 20 May 2018
Source: Competitions

=== Premier League ===
==== Results summary ====
Overall								Home						Away					
Pld	W	D	L	GF	GA	GD	Pts	W	D	L	GF	GA	GD	W	D	L	GF	GA	GD
28	6	5	17	18	38	−20	23	4	1	9	6	17	−11	2	4	8	12	21	−9

Last updated: 20 May 2018.
Source: See Results

==== Results ====
13 August 2017 1	Zira	2 – 1	Səbail	Zirə
19:00 AZT (UTC+4)	Đurić 3'; Gadze 17'; Krneta (yellow card) 87'	Report	Maudo (yellow card) 8'; Nadirov 43'	Stadium: Zira Olympic Sport Complex Stadium; Attendance: 900; Referee: Rahim Həsənov

19 August 2017 2	Səbail	1 – 0	Neftchi Baku	Baku
18:00 AZT (UTC+4)	T.Tsetskhladze (yellow card) 76'; Tagaýew 90' (yellow card) 90+3'	Report	Meza (yellow card) 45+1'; F.Muradbayli (yellow card) 90+3'	Stadium: Dalga Arena; Attendance: 200; Referee: Ramil Diniyev

25 August 2017 3	Inter Baku	1 – 0	Səbail	Baku
18:00 AZT (UTC+4)	Hajiyev 4'; Qirtimov (yellow card) 34'; Guliyev (yellow card) 50' (yellow-red card) 63'; S.Zargarov (yellow card) 88'	Report	N.Novruzov (yellow card) 34'; P.Garakhanov (yellow card) 68'	Stadium: Inter Arena; Attendance: 1,000; Referee: Ingilab Məmmədov

17 September 2017 5	Səbail	1 – 3	Gabala	Baku
21:00 AZT (UTC+4)	E.Yagublu (yellow card) 32'; Nadirov 56'	Report	Dabo 42', 90+3'; Vernydub (yellow card) 57'; As.Mammadov 60'; Halliday (yellow card) 84'	Stadium: Dalga Arena; Attendance: 200; Referee: Rauf Jabbarov

23 September 2017 6	Səbail	1 – 0	Kapaz	Baku
17:30 AZT (UTC+4)	T.Tsetskhladze (yellow card) 54'; Tagaýew 60'; Nadirov (yellow card) 68'; E.Balayev (yellow card) 90'	Report	T.Rzayev (yellow card) 5'; I.Safarzade (yellow card) 30'; I.Sadıqov (yellow card) 66'; S.Rahimov (yellow card) 75'; K.Abdullazada (yellow card) 88'	Stadium: Dalga Arena; Attendance: 300; Referee: Rahim Həsənov

30 September 2017 7	Səbail	0 – 2	Sumgayit	Baku
17:00 AZT (UTC+4)	T.Tsetskhladze (yellow card) 45'; Renan (yellow card) 45+1'	Report	A.Salahli 10'; K.Mirzayev (yellow card) 45'; T.Akhundov (yellow card) 45+1'; Yunanov (yellow card) 60'	Stadium: Dalga Arena; Attendance: 400; Referee: Ramil Diniyev

15 October 2017 8	Səbail	0 – 4	Neftchi Baku	Baku
18:30 AZT (UTC+4)	Tagaýew (yellow card) 6'; A.Mukhtaroglu (yellow card) 80'	Report	Herrera 17'; Bargas 31', 77'; A.Krivotsyuk (yellow card) 37'; Meza (yellow card) 58' (yellow-red card) 85'; Hajiyev 65'	Stadium: Dalga Arena; Attendance: 400; Referee: Fariz Yusifov

20 October 2017 9	Səbail	1 – 0	Inter Baku	Baku
18:00 AZT (UTC+4)	M.Abakarov 16'; Maudo (yellow card) 90+3'; E.Yagublu (yellow card) 90+3'	Report	F.Bayramov (yellow card) 90+2'	Stadium: Dalga Arena; Attendance: 250; Referee: Ramil Diniyev

27 October 2017 10	Qarabağ	1 – 0	Səbail	Baku
19:00 AZT (UTC+4)	Henrique (yellow card) 15'; Agolli (yellow card) 31' (yellow-red card) 43'; Madatov (yellow card) 80'; Ismayilov 89'	Report	K.Gurbanov (yellow card) 64'; M.Abakarov (yellow card) 89'	Stadium: Azersun Arena; Attendance: 900; Referee: Ravan Həmzəzadə

4 November 2017 11	Gabala	3 – 1	Səbail	Qabala
16:00 AZT (UTC+4)	Koné 16'; Dabo 29', 83'	Report	K.Gurbanov (yellow card) 56'; E.Yagublu 88' (yellow card) 90+2'	Stadium: Gabala City Stadium; Attendance: 1,500; Referee: Rauf Jabbarov

17 November 2017 12	Kapaz	2 – 3	Səbail	Ganja
15:00 AZT (UTC+4)	Dedimar (yellow card) 3' (red card) 5'; I.Safarzade 28'; K.Diniyev 36' (pen.); A.Karimov (yellow card) 42'; S.Rahimov (yellow card) 83'; S.Aliyev (yellow card) 88'	Report	Popovici 5' (pen.); Statie 15'; E.Balayev (yellow card) 35'; Nadirov 57'; E.Yagublu (yellow card) 69'; Agayev (yellow card) 79'; K.Gurbanov (yellow card) 86'	Stadium: Ganja City Stadium; Attendance: 9,300; Referee: Rauf Jabbarov

26 November 2017 13	Sumgayit	0 – 0	Səbail	Sumqayit
16:00 AZT (UTC+4)	T.Akhundov (yellow card) 70'; Hüseynov (yellow card) 83'	Report	Agayev (yellow card) 68'; T.Tsetskhladze (yellow card) 82'	Stadium: Kapital Bank Arena; Attendance: 1,326; Referee: Rahim Həsənov

3 December 2017 14	Səbail	0 – 1	Zira	Baku
18:30 AZT (UTC+4)	P.Garakhanov (yellow card) 61'; Maudo (yellow card) 74'	Report	I.Muradov (yellow card) 34'; Naghiyev 39'; Mustafayev (yellow card) 68'; Gadze (yellow card) 85'	Stadium: Bayil Arena; Attendance: Omar Paşayev; Referee: 350

8 December 2017 4	Səbail	0 – 2	Qarabağ	Baku
19:00 AZT (UTC+4)	E.Yagublu (yellow card) 38'	Report	Pedro Henrique 57'; Quintana 69'	Stadium: Bayil Stadium; Attendance: 653; Referee: Orkhan Məmmədov
Note: Match originally scheduled for 7 September 2017.

11 February 2017 15	Keşla	1 – 1	Səbail	Baku
15:00 AZT (UTC+4)	Fardjad-Azad 55'	Report	Tagaýew (yellow card) 32'; F.Muradbayli 35'; T.Tsetskhladze (yellow card) 44'	Stadium: Inter Arena; Attendance: 1,500; Referee: Ramil Diniyev

18 February 2018 16	Səbail	0 – 1	Qarabağ	Baku
17:30 AZT (UTC+4)	Mammadov (yellow card) 14'; T.Tsetskhladze (yellow card) 64'	Report	Madatov 51'	Stadium: Bayil Stadium; Attendance: 500; Referee: Elvin Əsgərov

24 February 2018 17	Səbail	2 – 1	Gabala	Baku
16:00 AZT (UTC+4)	Vernydub 25' (o.g.); F.Muradbayli 57'; E.Yagublu (yellow card) 88'	Report	Khalilzade (yellow card) 31'; As.Mammadov (yellow card) 57'; Dabo 68'; H.Hajiyev (yellow card) 71'	Stadium: Bayil Stadium; Attendance: 500; Referee: Aliyar Ağayev

3 March 2018 18	Kapaz	2 – 1	Səbail	Ganja
15:00 AZT (UTC+4)	Dário 23' (pen.) (yellow card) 43'; Dedimar (yellow card) 33'; Mandzhgaladze (yellow card) 48'; T.Jahangirov 49'	Report	Mammadov (yellow card) 22'; Cociuc 30' (yellow card) 80'; Maudo (yellow card) 68'	Stadium: Ganja City Stadium; Attendance: 5,332; Referee: Ingilab Məmmədov

10 March 2018 19	Səbail	0 – 1	Sumgayit	Baku
16:00 AZT (UTC+4)	N.Apakidze (yellow card) 80'	Report	Yunanov 69'	Stadium: Bayil Arena; Attendance: 500; Referee: Rahim Həsənov

14 March 2018 20	Zira	1 – 1	Səbail	Zirə
17:00 AZT (UTC+4)	Dedov 17'; Naghiyev (yellow card) 59'; I.Muradov (yellow card) 71'	Report	Mammadov (yellow card) 42'; N.Apakidze 54'; Orazsähedow (yellow card) 59'; N.Novruzov (yellow card) 90+1'	Stadium: Zira Olympic Sport Complex Stadium; Attendance: 1,200; Referee: Orkhan Məmmədov

2 April 2018 21	Neftchi Baku	2 – 0	Səbail	Baku
19:30 AZT (UTC+4)	Herrera 49', 87'; Petrov (yellow card) 84'	Report	Cociuc (yellow card) 35'; T.Tsetskhladze (yellow card) 58'; Maudo (yellow card) 63'	Stadium: Bakcell Arena; Attendance: 600; Referee: Rauf Jabbarov

7 April 2018 22	Qarabağ	1 – 0	Səbail	Baku
17:30 AZT (UTC+4)	Richard 31' (pen.)	Report	N.Novruzov (yellow card) 7'; Maudo (yellow card) 83'	Stadium: Azersun Arena; Attendance: 1,200; Referee: Ramil Diniyev

15 April 2018 23	Gabala	1 – 1	Səbail	Qabala
17:00 AZT (UTC+4)	Ramaldanov (yellow card) 27'; E.Jamalov (yellow card) 61'; Koné 82' (yellow card) 84'; G.Aliyev (yellow card) 90+4'	Report	T.Tsetskhladze (yellow card) 20'; F.Muradbayli 55'	Stadium: Gabala City Stadium; Attendance: 250; Referee: Aliyar Ağayev

22 April 2018 24	Səbail	1 – 1	Kapaz	Baku
17:00 AZT (UTC+4)	Miya 24'; Mammadov (yellow card) 72'; Nadirov (yellow card) 83'	Report	Dário 19'; S.Aliyev (yellow card) 73'	Stadium: Bayil Arena; Attendance: 400; Referee: Ramil Diniyev

29 April 2018 25	Sumgayit	1 – 2	Səbail	Sumqayit
19:00 AZT (UTC+4)	N.Gurbanov (yellow card) 70'; Yunanov 76'	Report	Miya 31'; A.Gurbanli 39'; Cociuc (yellow card) 87'	Stadium: Kapital Bank Arena; Attendance: 1,200; Referee: Ravan Həmzəzadə

5 May 2018 26	Səbail	0 – 1	Zira	Baku
17:00 AZT (UTC+4)	Tagaýew (yellow card) 11'; N.Apakidze (yellow card) 56'	Report	V.Igbekoyi (yellow card) 9'; M.İlyasov 16'; Gadze (yellow card) 33'; S.Guliyev (yellow card) 85'; M.Abbasov (yellow card) 90+2'	Stadium: Bayil Arena; Attendance: 500; Referee: Ingilab Məmmədov

12 May 2018 27	Neftchi Baku	3 – 1	Səbail	Baku
19:00 AZT (UTC+4)	Alaskarov 33'; Hajiyev 36'; Meza (yellow card) 38'; Gómez 80'; A.Krivotsyuk (yellow card) 90+1'	Report	E.Yagublu (yellow card) 42'; Cociuc 83' (pen.)	Stadium: Dalga Arena; Attendance: 500; Referee: Rauf Jabbarov

20 May 2018 28	Səbail	0 – 1	Keşla	Baku
17:15 AZT (UTC+4)	N.Apakidze (yellow card) 70'	Report	Fardjad-Azad (yellow card) 23'; Scarlatache (yellow card) 54'; M.Guliyev 63'; Javadov (yellow card) 69'	Stadium: Bayil Arena; Attendance: 300; Referee: Vugar Həsənli

==== League table ====
Pos	Team	Pld	W	D	L	GF	GA	GD	Pts	Qualification or relegation
4	Zira	28	12	8	8	36	30	+6	44	
5	Sumgayit	28	11	7	10	34	33	+1	40	
6	Keşla	28	8	7	13	29	39	−10	31	Qualification for the Europa League first qualifying round (Note: Keşla qualified for the Europa League first qualifying round by winning 2017–18 Azerbaijan Cup.)
7	Səbail	28	6	5	17	19	39	−20	23	
8	Kapaz (R)	28	3	5	20	18	47	−29	14	Relegation to the Azerbaijan First Division

Source: UEFA, Soccerway
Rules for classification: 1) Points; 2) Head-to-head points; 3) Head-to-head goal difference; 4) Head-to-head goals scored; 5) Head-to-head away goals scored (only if two teams); 6) Goal difference; 7) Goals scored.
(R) Relegated

=== Azerbaijan Cup ===
29 November 2017 Second Round	Shuvalan	1 – 2	Səbail	Baku
13:30 AZT (UTC+4)	E.Hasanaliyev 10'; T.Narimanov (yellow card) 79'; O.Safiyaroglu (yellow card) 81'; M.Hashimli (yellow card) 86'; V.Abdullayev (yellow card) 88'	Report	A.Huseynov 60' (yellow card) 81'; N.Novruzov (yellow card) 67'; Statie 78'	Stadium: AZAL Arena; Attendance: 100; Referee: Fariz Yusifov

11 December 2017 Quarterfinal 1st leg	Gabala	1 – 0	Səbail	Qabala
16:00 AZT (UTC+4)	Joseph-Monrose 59'; J.Huseynov (penalty missed) 76'; Stanković (yellow card) 90+3'	Report		Stadium: Gabala City Stadium; Attendance: 400; Referee: Ravan Hamzazade

15 December 2017 Quarterfinal 2nd leg	Səbail	2 – 4 (2 – 5 agg.)	Gabala	Baku
16:00 AZT (UTC+4)	Popovici 16'; Nadirov (yellow card) 37'; Tagaýew 78'	Report	Ozobić 22'; Qurbanov (yellow card) 24' (goal) 44'; Koné 56' (yellow card) 59'; Dabo 75'; Abbasov (yellow card) 77'	Stadium: Bayil Arena; Attendance: 250; Referee: Ingilab Mammadov

== Squad statistics ==
As of Match played 20 May 2018

=== Appearances and goals ===
No.	Pos	Nat	Player	Total		Premier League		Azerbaijan Cup	
No.	Pos	Nat	Player	Apps	Goals	Apps	Goals	Apps	Goals
1	GK	(Azerbaijan) AZE	Emil Balayev	26	0	24	0	2	0
3	DF	(Georgia (country)) GEO	Tamaz Tsetskhladze	26	0	21+2	0	3	0
4	DF	(Azerbaijan) AZE	Rahil Mammadov	13	0	13	0	0	0
5	DF	(Azerbaijan) AZE	Karim Diniyev	13	0	10+3	0	0	0
6	MF	(Azerbaijan) AZE	Murad Agayev	10	0	6+2	0	2	0
7	MF	(Azerbaijan) AZE	Fahmin Muradbayli	10	3	7+3	3	0	0
8	MF	(Azerbaijan) AZE	Agshin Mukhtaroglu	8	0	5+3	0	0	0
10	FW	(Azerbaijan) AZE	Nurlan Novruzov	24	0	11+10	0	1+2	0
11	MF	(Turkmenistan) TKM	Elman Tagaýew	27	3	18+7	2	0+2	1
13	MF	(Uganda) UGA	Farouk Miya	13	2	11+2	2	0	0
15	DF	(Georgia (country)) GEO	Nika Apakidze	14	1	14	1	0	0
17	FW	(Azerbaijan) AZE	Vüqar Nadirov	27	3	19+6	3	2	0
18	MF	(Azerbaijan) AZE	Agshin Gurbanli	8	1	4+4	1	0	0
20	DF	(Azerbaijan) AZE	Eltun Yagublu	25	1	21+1	1	3	0
21	MF	(Azerbaijan) AZE	Murtuzali Abakarov	6	1	4+2	1	0	0
23	DF	(Curaçao) CUW	Ayrton Statie	21	2	16+2	1	3	1
24	DF	(Azerbaijan) AZE	Ruslan Amirjanov	2	0	2	0	0	0
25	GK	(Azerbaijan) AZE	Elkhan Ahmadov	5	0	4	0	1	0
26	DF	(Azerbaijan) AZE	Kamal Gurbanov	21	0	17+2	0	0+2	0
29	MF	(Moldova) MDA	Eugeniu Cociuc	13	2	13	2	0	0
66	MF	(Azerbaijan) AZE	Parviz Garakhanov	14	0	10+1	0	2+1	0
88	MF	(Azerbaijan) AZE	Orkhan Gurbanli	5	0	1+4	0	0	0
92	FW	(Turkmenistan) TKM	Wahyt Orazsähedow	10	0	7+3	0	0	0
98	DF	(Azerbaijan) AZE	Kamran Aliyev	1	0	0	0	0+1	0
99	DF	(Guinea-Bissau) GBS	Maudo Jarjué	22	0	19+1	0	2	0
	DF	(Azerbaijan) AZE	Aslan Hüseynov	1	1	0	0	1	1
Players away on loan:
5	MF	(Azerbaijan) AZE	Seymur Asadov	1	0	0	0	0+1	0
7	FW	(Azerbaijan) AZE	Emin Mehdiyev	2	0	0+2	0	0	0
9	FW	(Azerbaijan) AZE	Raul Yagubzade	6	0	0+5	0	1	0
Players who left Səbail during the season:
4	MF	(Azerbaijan) AZE	Amit Guluzade	7	0	2+4	0	1	0
13	DF	(Azerbaijan) AZE	Murad Musayev	4	0	0+1	0	3	0
14	MF	(Azerbaijan) AZE	Yamin Agakerimzade	5	0	1+2	0	2	0
18	MF	(Romania) ROU	Alexandru Popovici	11	2	7+2	1	2	1
35	DF	(Lithuania) LTU	Edgaras Žarskis	10	0	10	0	0	0
69	FW	(Brazil) BRA	Renan Telles	10	0	5+4	0	1	0
77	DF	(Azerbaijan) AZE	Tayyar Mammadov	5	0	0+4	0	1	0

=== Goal scorers ===
Place	Position	Nation	Number	Name	Premier League	Azerbaijan Cup	Total
1	FW	(Azerbaijan)	17	Vüqar Nadirov	3	0	3
1	MF	(Azerbaijan)	7	Fahmin Muradbayli	3	0	3
1	MF	(Turkmenistan)	11	Elman Tagaýew	2	1	3
4	MF	(Uganda)	13	Farouk Miya	2	0	2
4	MF	(Moldova)	29	Eugeniu Cociuc	2	0	2
4	DF	(Curaçao)	23	Ayrton Statie	1	1	2
4	MF	(Romania)	18	Alexandru Popovici	1	1	2
7	MF	(Azerbaijan)	21	Murtuzali Abakarov	1	0	1
7	DF	(Azerbaijan)	20	Eltun Yagublu	1	0	1
7	DF	(Georgia (country))	15	Nika Apakidze	1	0	1
7	MF	(Azerbaijan)	18	Agshin Gurbanli	1	0	1
7	DF	(Azerbaijan)		Aslan Hüseynov	0	1	1
7				Own goal	1	0	1
				TOTALS	19	4	23

=== Clean sheets ===
Place	Position	Nation	Number	Name	Premier League	Azerbaijan Cup	Total
1	GK	(Azerbaijan)	1	Emil Balayev	4	0	4
				TOTALS	4	0	4

=== Disciplinary record ===
Number	Nation	Position	Name	Premier League		Azerbaijan Cup		Total	
Number	Nation	Position	Name	Yellow card	Red card	Yellow card	Red card	Yellow card	Red card
1	(Azerbaijan)	GK	Emil Balayev	2	0	0	0	2	0
3	(Georgia (country))	DF	Tamaz Tsetskhladze	7	0	0	0	7	0
4	(Azerbaijan)	DF	Rahil Mammadov	4	0	0	0	4	0
6	(Azerbaijan)	MF	Murad Agayev	2	0	0	0	2	0
8	(Azerbaijan)	MF	Agshin Mukhtaroglu	1	0	0	0	1	0
10	(Azerbaijan)	FW	Nurlan Novruzov	3	0	1	0	4	0
11	(Turkmenistan)	MF	Elman Tagaýew	4	0	0	0	4	0
15	(Georgia (country))	DF	Nika Apakidze	3	0	0	0	3	0
17	(Azerbaijan)	FW	Vüqar Nadirov	2	0	1	0	3	0
20	(Azerbaijan)	DF	Eltun Yagublu	7	0	0	0	7	0
21	(Azerbaijan)	MF	Murtuzali Abakarov	1	0	0	0	1	0
26	(Azerbaijan)	DF	Kamal Gurbanov	3	0	0	0	3	0
29	(Azerbaijan)	MF	Eugeniu Cociuc	3	0	0	0	3	0
66	(Azerbaijan)	MF	Parviz Garakhanov	2	0	0	0	2	0
92	(Turkmenistan)	FW	Wahyt Orazsähedow	1	0	0	0	1	0
99	(Guinea-Bissau)	DF	Maudo Jarjué	6	0	0	0	6	0
	(Azerbaijan)	DF	Aslan Hüseynov	0	0	1	0	1	0
Players who left Səbail during the season:
69	(Brazil)	FW	Renan Telles	1	0	0	0	1	0
			TOTALS	53	0	3	0	56	0
