= 2017–18 Kapaz PFK season =

Kapaz
2017–18 season
- President: Elmir Valiyev
- Manager: Shahin Diniyev (until 18 November); Yunis Hüseynov (from 20 November)
- Stadium: Ganja City Stadium
- Premier League: 8th
- Azerbaijan Cup: Quarterfinal vs Keshla
- Top goalscorer: League: Two Players (4); All: Four Players (4)

The Kapaz PFK 2017–18 season was Kapaz's sixth Azerbaijan Premier League season, and ninth season since their reformation in 2009.

== Season events ==
On 18 November, Shahin Diniyev resigned as manager with Yunis Hüseynov being appointed as his replacement on 20 November.

== Squad ==
As of 9 February 2018

Note: Flags indicate national team as defined under FIFA eligibility rules; some limited exceptions apply. Players may hold more than one non-FIFA nationality.

No.	Pos.	Nation	Player
1	GK	AZE	Davud Karimi
2	FW	AZE	Yusif Jafarov
3	DF	BRA	Dedimar Ferreira
4	DF	AZE	Shahriyar Aliyev
5	DF	AZE	Tural Narimanov
6	MF	AZE	Jeyhun Javadov
7	MF	AZE	Roman Huseynov (loan from Gabala)
8	MF	AZE	Samir Zargarov
9	FW	AZE	İlkin Sadıqov
10	MF	AZE	Tural Rzayev
11	MF	AZE	Kamran Abdullazadeh
12	DF	AZE	Ilyas Safarzade
13	MF	AZE	Shahriyar Rahimov (vice-captain)

No.	Pos.	Nation	Player
14	MF	AZE	Farid Mammadov
15	MF	UKR	Ihor Korotetskyi
16	MF	UKR	Giuli Mandzhgaladze
17	MF	AZE	Ali Samadov
18	MF	AZE	Tural Jalilov
20	MF	AZE	Tarzin Jahangirov
21	MF	AZE	Murad Sattarli
22	GK	UKR	Serhiy Litovchenko
23	MF	AZE	Ali Aliyev
24	FW	TTO	Shahdon Winchester
48	MF	BRA	Diego Souza
55	GK	AZE	Tarlan Gasimzadeh
91	FW	BRA	Dário

== Transfers ==
=== Summer ===
In: Note: Flags indicate national team as defined under FIFA eligibility rules; some limited exceptions apply. Players may hold more than one non-FIFA nationality.

No.	Pos.	Nation	Player
3	DF	BRA	Dedimar Ferreira (from (Brazil) Rio Negro)
7	MF	AZE	Sergey Chernyshev (from (Azerbaijan) Sumgayit)
8	FW	NGR	Victor Lucky Oseghale (from (Malta) Mosta)
9	FW	AZE	İlkin Sadıqov (from (Azerbaijan) Turan-Tovuz)
11	MF	AZE	Kamran Abdullazada (from (Azerbaijan) Sumgayit)
12	DF	AZE	Ilyas Safarzade (from (Azerbaijan) AZAL)
16	FW	AZE	Azar Mammadov (from (Azerbaijan) Turan-Tovuz)
18	MF	AZE	Tural Jalilov (from (Azerbaijan) Zira)
19	FW	AZE	Aydin Gasimov (from (Azerbaijan) AZAL)
20	MF	MLI	Samba Diallo (from (Morocco) Mouloudia d'Oujda)
22	GK	AZE	Ruzi Giyasli (from (Azerbaijan) Neftchi Baku)
24	FW	AZE	Magomed Kurbanov (from (Azerbaijan) Sumgayit)
26	MF	SEN	Aladji Mansour Ba (from (Morocco) Kénitra)

Out: Note: Flags indicate national team as defined under FIFA eligibility rules; some limited exceptions apply. Players may hold more than one non-FIFA nationality.

No.	Pos.	Nation	Player
1	GK	AZE	Eyyub Aliyev (to (Azerbaijan) Shuvalan)
7	DF	AZE	Vugar Beybalayev (to (Azerbaijan) Sumgayit)
9	FW	AZE	Tural Gurbatov (to (Turkey) Atakum Belediyyespor)
10	FW	BRA	Dário (to (South Korea) Seongnam)
14	FW	AZE	Farid Mammadov
17	MF	AZE	Nijat Gurbanov (to (Azerbaijan) Zira)
18	DF	AZE	Tural Akhundov (to (Azerbaijan) Sumgayit)
19	FW	AZE	Orkhan Aliyev (to (Azerbaijan) Zira)
23	DF	AZE	Tural Narimanov
36	DF	BRA	Renan Alves (to (Serbia) Vojvodina)
77	MF	POR	Serginho (to (Portugal) Trofense)
88	GK	LTU	Tadas Simaitis (to (Lithuania) Jonava)
90	FW	CMR	Julien Ebah (to (Qatar) Al-Khor)
98	DF	AZE	Eljan Rahimov

=== Winter ===
In: Note: Flags indicate national team as defined under FIFA eligibility rules; some limited exceptions apply. Players may hold more than one non-FIFA nationality.

No.	Pos.	Nation	Player
5	DF	AZE	Tural Narimanov (from (Azerbaijan) Shuvalan)
7	MF	AZE	Roman Huseynov (loan from (Azerbaijan) Gabala)
8	MF	AZE	Samir Zargarov (from (Azerbaijan) Keshla)
15	DF	UKR	Ihor Korotetskyi (from (Ukraine) Avanhard)
16	MF	UKR	Giuli Mandzhgaladze (from (Georgia (country)) Samtredia)
20	MF	AZE	Tarzin Jahangirov (from (Azerbaijan) Neftchi Baku)
21	MF	AZE	Murad Sattarli (from (Azerbaijan) Zira)
22	GK	UKR	Serhiy Litovchenko (from (Georgia (country)) Dinamo Tbilisi)
24	FW	TTO	Shahdon Winchester (loan from (Mexico) Murciélagos)
48	MF	BRA	Diego Souza
55	GK	AZE	Tarlan Gasimzade (from (Azerbaijan) Sabah)
91	FW	BRA	Dário (from (South Korea) Seongnam)

Out: Note: Flags indicate national team as defined under FIFA eligibility rules; some limited exceptions apply. Players may hold more than one non-FIFA nationality.

No.	Pos.	Nation	Player
5	DF	AZE	Karim Diniyev
7	MF	AZE	Sergey Chernyshev
8	FW	NGR	Victor Lucky Oseghale
15	DF	AZE	Azad Karimov
16	FW	AZE	Azar Mammadov
19	FW	AZE	Aydin Gasimov (to (Azerbaijan) Khazar Baku)
20	MF	MLI	Samba Diallo
21	DF	AZE	Novruz Mammadov (to (Azerbaijan) Khazar Baku)
22	GK	AZE	Ruzi Giyasli
24	FW	AZE	Magomed Kurbanov (to (Azerbaijan) Sabah)
26	MF	SEN	Aladji Mansour Ba

Trial: Note: Flags indicate national team as defined under FIFA eligibility rules; some limited exceptions apply. Players may hold more than one non-FIFA nationality.

No.	Pos.	Nation	Player
—	MF	BRA	Diego Souza
—	FW	ENG	Alex Nimely

== Friendlies ==
13 January 2018	Kapaz	1 – 0	Kapaz Reserves	Baku
14:00 AZT (UTC+4)	T.Rzayev	Report		Stadium: Azerbaijan State Physical Culture and Sports Academy

15 January 2018	Kapaz	v	Sabah	Baku
14:00 AZT (UTC+4)		Report		Stadium: Azerbaijan State Physical Culture and Sports Academy

22 January 2018	Kapaz (Azerbaijan)	1 – 1	(Romania) Viitorul Constanța	Antalya, Turkey
AZT (UTC+4)	S.Rahimov	Report	Goal

25 January 2018	Kapaz (Azerbaijan)	1 – 0	(South Korea) Daejeon Citizen	Antalya, Turkey
AZT (UTC+4)	I.Sadıqov	Report

28 January 2018	Kapaz (Azerbaijan)	1 – 8	(Poland) Jagiellonia Białystok	Antalya, Turkey
AZT (UTC+4)	Guilherme 9'; Świderski 12', 28'; Frankowski 23', 33', 40'; Lazarević 38'; Wasiluk 77'	Report	Sheridan 90' (o.g.)

31 January 2018	Kapaz (Azerbaijan)	2 – 0	(Serbia) Spartak Subotica	Antalya, Turkey
AZT (UTC+4)	I.Sadıqov; Dário	Report

== Competitions ==
=== Azerbaijan Premier League ===
==== Results summary ====
Overall								Home						Away					
Pld	W	D	L	GF	GA	GD	Pts	W	D	L	GF	GA	GD	W	D	L	GF	GA	GD
28	3	5	20	17	41	−24	14	1	3	10	7	20	−13	2	2	10	10	21	−11

Last updated: 20 May 2018.
Source: See Results

==== Results ====
13 August 2017 1	Sumgayit	2 – 1	Kapaz	Sumqayit
21:00 AZT (UTC+4)	Imamverdiyev 16'; V.Beybalayev (yellow card) 24'; Taghiyev (yellow card) 68'; Yunanov 74'; B.Hasanalizade (yellow card) 83'; K.Mirzayev (yellow card) 90+2'	Report	V.Oseghale 52'	Stadium: Kapital Bank Arena; Attendance: 1,326; Referee: Fariz Yusifov

20 August 2017 2	Kapaz	0 – 3	Zira	Yevlakh
17:00 AZT (UTC+4)	S.Aliyev (yellow card) 60'	Report	N.Gurbanov 21'; T.Khalilzade 49', 87'; Mustafayev (yellow card) 81'	Stadium: Şəhər Stadium; Attendance: 2,000; Referee: Ravan Həmzəzadə

25 August 2017 3	Neftchi Baku	0 – 0	Kapaz	Baku
20:30 AZT (UTC+4)	Petrov (yellow card) 23'; A.Krivotsyuk (yellow card) 31'; Dreksa (yellow card) 38'; Herrera (yellow card) 71'	Report	S.Rahimov (yellow card) 8'; A.Mammadov (yellow card) 76'	Stadium: Bakcell Arena; Attendance: 1,800; Referee: Orkhan Məmmədov

9 September 2017 4	Inter Baku	3 – 2	Kapaz	Baku
17:00 AZT (UTC+4)	F.Bayramov 5'; Scarlatache 21'; A.Guluzadeh 33'; S.Zargarov (yellow card) 76'; O.Sadigli (yellow card) 90+4'; Qirtimov (yellow card) 90+5'	Report	S.Aliyev 34' (yellow card) 74'; K.Diniyev 37'; N.Mammadov (yellow card) 39'	Stadium: Inter Arena; Attendance: 800; Referee: Aliyar Ağayev

17 September 2017 5	Qarabağ	2 – 0	Kapaz	Baku
18:30 AZT (UTC+4)	Diniyev 34'; Elyounoussi (yellow card) 70'; Quintana 80'	Report	S.Aliyev (yellow card) 38'	Stadium: Azersun Arena; Attendance: 2,800; Referee: Ravan Həmzəzadə

23 September 2017 6	Sabail	1 – 0	Kapaz	Baku
17:30 AZT (UTC+4)	T.Tsetskhladze (yellow card) 54'; Tagaýew 60'; Nadirov (yellow card) 68'; E.Balayev (yellow card) 90'	Report	T.Rzayev (yellow card) 5'; I.Safarzade (yellow card) 30'; I.Sadıqov (yellow card) 66'; S.Rahimov (yellow card) 75'; K.Abdullazada (yellow card) 88'	Stadium: Dalga Arena; Attendance: 300; Referee: Rahim Həsənov

29 September 2017 7	Gabala	0 – 2	Kapaz	Qabala
18:30 AZT (UTC+4)	Qurbanov (yellow card) 47'; As.Mammadov (yellow card) 83'; G.Aliyev (yellow card) 84'; E.Mammadov (yellow card) 90+2'	Report	K.Diniyev 48'; S.Rahimov (yellow card) 53'; I.Sadigov 56' (yellow card) 59'	Stadium: Gabala City Stadium; Attendance: 175; Referee: Ingilab Məmmədov

14 October 2017 8	Zira	3 – 0	Kapaz	Zirə
16:00 AZT (UTC+4)	Đurić (yellow card) 27'; Khalilzade 47', 64'; Gadze 76'	Report	N.Mammadov (yellow card) 70'; S.Aliyev (yellow card) 82'	Stadium: Zira Olympic Sport Complex Stadium; Attendance: 1,100; Referee: Rahim Həsənov

21 October 2017 9	Kapaz	0 – 1	Neftchi Baku	Yevlakh
15:00 AZT (UTC+4)	K.Diniyev (yellow card) 80'	Report	Abışov 41'	Stadium: Şəhər Stadium; Attendance: 8,000; Referee: Aliyar Ağayev

28 October 2017 10	Keşla	0 – 2	Kapaz	Baku
15:00 AZT (UTC+4)	F.Bayramov (yellow card) 87'; Fardjad-Azad (yellow card) 90+3'	Report	M.Gayaly 15' (o.g.); I.Safarzade 65'; Chernyshev (yellow card) 67'; J.Javadov (yellow card) 90+3'	Stadium: Inter Arena; Attendance: 4,000; Referee: Orkhan Məmmədov

5 November 2017 11	Kapaz	0 – 2	Qarabağ	Ganja
15:00 AZT (UTC+4)	T.Rzayev (yellow card) 45'; V.Oseghale (yellow card) 89'	Report	Yunuszade 42'; Míchel 43' (yellow card) 52'	Stadium: Ganja City Stadium; Attendance: 13,300; Referee: Rahim Həsənov

18 November 2017 12	Kapaz	2 – 3	Sabail	Ganja
15:00 AZT (UTC+4)	Dedimar (yellow card) 3' (red card) 5'; I.Safarzade 28'; K.Diniyev 36' (pen.); A.Karimov (yellow card) 42'; S.Rahimov (yellow card) 83'; S.Aliyev (yellow card) 88'	Report	Popovici 5' (pen.); Statie 15'; E.Balayev (yellow card) 35'; Nadirov 57'; E.Yagublu (yellow card) 69'; Agayev (yellow card) 79'; K.Gurbanov (yellow card) 86'	Stadium: Ganja City Stadium; Attendance: 9,300; Referee: Rauf Jabbarov

25 November 2017 13	Kapaz	1 – 6	Gabala	Ganja
14:30 AZT (UTC+4)	I.Sadigov (yellow card) 27'; N.Mammadov (yellow card) 35'; K.Diniyev 56' (pen.)	Report	Dabo 1', 54'; Joseph-Monrose 14'; Koné (yellow card) 31' (goal) 40', 78'; Abbasov 58'; Qurbanov 65'	Stadium: Ganja City Stadium; Attendance: 8,500; Referee: Omar Paşayev

2 December 2017 13	Kapaz	0 – 3	Sumgayit	Ganja
14:00 AZT (UTC+4)	S.Aliyev (yellow card) 81'	Report	B.Hasanalizade 21' (yellow card) 32'; Imamverdiyev 60', 68'	Stadium: Ganja City Stadium; Attendance: 9,500; Referee: Rahim Hasanov

11 February 2018 15	Neftchi Baku	1 – 0	Kapaz	Baku
17:30 AZT (UTC+4)	Mirzabeyov (yellow card) 58'; M.Abbasov 86'	Report	I.Safarzade (yellow card) 57'; Diego Souza (yellow card) 74'; S.Rahimov (yellow card) 90+3'	Stadium: Bakcell Arena; Attendance: 2,000; Referee: Rahim Həsənov

18 February 2018 16	Kapaz	0 – 1	Keşla	Ganja
15:00 AZT (UTC+4)	Souza (yellow card) 27'; Mandzhgaladze (yellow card) 81'	Report	F.Bayramov 51'	Stadium: Ganja City Stadium; Attendance: 1,150; Referee: Ravan Həmzəzadə

25 February 2018 17	Qarabağ	1 – 0	Kapaz	Baku
18:00 AZT (UTC+4)	Richard 85'; Sheydayev (yellow card) 90+3'	Report	T.Jahangirov (yellow card) 23'; Dário (yellow card) 81'; Dedimar (yellow card) 88'	Stadium: Azersun Arena; Attendance: 1,488; Referee: Orkhan Məmmədov

3 March 2018 18	Kapaz	2 – 1	Sabail	Ganja
15:00 AZT (UTC+4)	Dário 23' (pen.) (yellow card) 43'; Dedimar (yellow card) 33'; Mandzhgaladze (yellow card) 48'; T.Jahangirov 49'	Report	R.Mammadov (yellow card) 22'; Cociuc 30' (yellow card) 80'; Maudo (yellow card) 68'	Stadium: Ganja City Stadium; Attendance: 5,332; Referee: Ingilab Məmmədov

9 March 2018 19	Kapaz	0 – 1	Gabala	Ganja
15:00 AZT (UTC+4)	Jalilov (yellow card) 21'	Report	H.Hajiyev (yellow card) 19'; Qurbanov (yellow card) 30'; Ozobić 66'	Stadium: Ganja City Stadium; Attendance: 5,000; Referee: Ravan Hamzazade

14 March 2018 20	Sumgayit	2 – 1	Kapaz	Sumqayit
20:00 AZT (UTC+4)	B.Mustafazade 73'; Imamverdiyev 89'	Report	Korotetskyi 44' (yellow card) 63'; Mandzhgaladze (yellow card) 67'; Dário (yellow card) 71'	Stadium: Kapital Bank Arena; Attendance: 1,000; Referee: Aliyar Ağayev

1 April 2018 21	Kapaz	0 – 0	Zira	Ganja
15:00 AZT (UTC+4)	Mandzhgaladze (yellow card) 59'	Report	Đurić (yellow card) 45+1'; Williams (yellow card) 64'	Stadium: Ganja City Stadium; Attendance: 5,650; Referee: Rahim Həsənov

7 April 2018 22	Kapaz	1 – 1	Keşla	Ganja
15:00 AZT (UTC+4)	S.Zargarov (yellow card) 20'; Dário 45'; S.Rahimov (yellow card) 60'	Report	Javadov 26'; S.Alkhasov (yellow card) 34'; Clennon (yellow card) 45'; F.Bayramov (yellow card) 51'; Scarlatache (yellow card) 65'; Denis (yellow card) 70'; M.Guliyev (yellow card) 90+1'	Stadium: Ganja City Stadium; Attendance: 5,000; Referee: Ingilab Məmmədov

14 April 2018 23	Kapaz	0 – 1	Qarabağ	Ganja
16:00 AZT (UTC+4)	Mandzhgaladze (yellow card) 31'; Jalilov (yellow card) 55'; S.Aliyev (yellow card) 76'; I.Sadıqov (yellow card) 80'	Report	Sheydayev 23'; Richard (yellow card) 23'	Stadium: Ganja City Stadium; Attendance: 8,000; Referee: Orkhan Məmmədov

22 April 2018 24	Sabail	1 – 1	Kapaz	Baku
17:00 AZT (UTC+4)	Miya 24'; R.Mammadov (yellow card) 72'; Nadirov (yellow card) 83'	Report	Dário 19'; S.Aliyev (yellow card) 73'	Stadium: Bayil Arena; Attendance: 400; Referee: Ramil Diniyev

28 April 2018 25	Gabala	3 – 0	Kapaz	Qabala
18:00 AZT (UTC+4)	G.Aliyev (yellow card) 8'; Abbasov (yellow card) 13'; Ozobić 31'; Joseph-Monrose 39'; Huseynov 45+1'; Koné (yellow card) 71'	Report	Mandzhgaladze (yellow card) 62'; R.Huseynov (yellow card) 70'	Stadium: Gabala City Stadium; Attendance: 800; Referee: Aliyar Ağayev

4 May 2018 26	Kapaz	1 – 1	Sumgayit	Ganja
16:00 AZT (UTC+4)	Mandzhgaladze (yellow card) 21'; Dário 66' (pen.)	Report	Yunanov 86'	Stadium: Ganja City Stadium; Attendance: 3,000; Referee: Rahim Həsənov

12 May 2018 27	Zira	2 – 1	Kapaz	Zirə
19:00 AZT (UTC+4)	Đurić (red card) 9'; Gadze 42'; Boum (yellow card) 55'; Mutallimov 75'	Report	K.Abdullazada (yellow card) 42' (yellow-red card) 80'; S.Rahimov 45+2' (pen.); Sattarli (yellow card) 60'; S.Zargarov (yellow card) 90+3'	Stadium: Zira Olympic Sport Complex Stadium; Attendance: 1,110; Referee: Ramil Diniyev

20 May 2018 28	Kapaz	1 – 2	Neftchi Baku	Ganja
17:15 AZT (UTC+4)	S.Aliyev (yellow card) 16'; Rahimov 67'; T.Rzayev (yellow card) 73'	Report	Abışov 64'; Petrov (yellow card) 70' (yellow-red card) 87'; Gómez 79'	Stadium: Ganja City Stadium; Attendance: 5,000; Referee: Rahim Həsənov

==== League table ====
Pos	Team	Pld	W	D	L	GF	GA	GD	Pts	Qualification or relegation
4	Zira	28	12	8	8	36	30	+6	44	
5	Sumgayit	28	11	7	10	34	33	+1	40	
6	Keşla	28	8	7	13	29	39	−10	31	Qualification for the Europa League first qualifying round (Note: Keşla qualified for the Europa League first qualifying round by winning 2017–18 Azerbaijan Cup.)
7	Səbail	28	6	5	17	19	39	−20	23	
8	Kapaz (R)	28	3	5	20	18	47	−29	14	Relegation to the Azerbaijan First Division

Source: UEFA, Soccerway
Rules for classification: 1) Points; 2) Head-to-head points; 3) Head-to-head goal difference; 4) Head-to-head goals scored; 5) Head-to-head away goals scored (only if two teams); 6) Goal difference; 7) Goals scored.
(R) Relegated

=== Azerbaijan Cup ===
29 November 2017 Second Round	Kapaz	3 – 0	Bine	Baku
13:30 AZT (UTC+4)	S.Rahimov (yellow card) 39' (goal) 83' (pen.); T.Rzayev (yellow card) 59'; K.Diniyev (yellow card) 65'; I.Safarzade 66', 71'	Report	B.Soltanov (yellow card) 62'; J.Rähimli (yellow card) 83'	Stadium: Dalga Arena; Attendance: 50; Referee: Nail Nağıyev

10 December 2017 Quarterfinal 1st leg	Keshla	2 – 0	Kapaz	Baku
14:00 AZT (UTC+4)	Fardjad-Azad 18'; R.Məhərrəmli 41'; Guliyev (yellow card) 58'; Scarlatache (yellow card) 62'; S.Alkhasov (yellow card) 62'; M.Abbasov (yellow card) 69'; F.Bayramov (yellow card) 81'	Report	Jalilov (yellow card) 39'; I.Safarzade (yellow card) 90+2'	Stadium: Inter Arena; Attendance: 1,000; Referee: Rauf Jabbarov

14 December 2017 Quarterfinal 2nd leg	Kapaz	2 – 3 (2 – 5 agg.)	Keshla	Ganja
13:00 AZT (UTC+4)	I.Sadigov (yellow card) 36'; S.Rahimov 48' (yellow card) 90+4'; S.Diallo (yellow card) 68'; K.Abdullazade 80'	Report	M.Abbasov 34', 85'; Fardjad-Azad 82'; E.Aliyev (yellow card) 90+1'	Stadium: Ganja City Stadium; Attendance: 700; Referee: Orkhan Mammadov

== Squad statistics ==
As of Match played 20 May 2018

=== Appearances and goals ===
No.	Pos	Nat	Player	Total		Premier League		Azerbaijan Cup	
No.	Pos	Nat	Player	Apps	Goals	Apps	Goals	Apps	Goals
1	GK	(Azerbaijan) AZE	Davud Karimi	17	0	14	0	3	0
2	FW	(Azerbaijan) AZE	Yusif Cəfərov	2	0	0+2	0	0	0
3	DF	(Brazil) BRA	Dedimar Ferreira	16	0	12+1	0	3	0
4	DF	(Azerbaijan) AZE	Shahriyar Aliyev	29	1	26	1	3	0
5	DF	(Azerbaijan) AZE	Tural Narimanov	6	0	4+2	0	0	0
6	MF	(Azerbaijan) AZE	Jeyhun Javadov	16	0	5+8	0	2+1	0
7	FW	(Azerbaijan) AZE	Roman Huseynov	11	0	10+1	0	0	0
8	MF	(Azerbaijan) AZE	Samir Zargarov	11	0	10+1	0	0	0
9	FW	(Azerbaijan) AZE	İlkin Sadıqov	25	1	11+11	1	3	0
10	MF	(Azerbaijan) AZE	Tural Rzayev	27	0	13+11	0	3	0
11	MF	(Azerbaijan) AZE	Kamran Abdullazade	13	1	4+6	0	1+2	1
12	DF	(Azerbaijan) AZE	Ilyas Safarzade	21	4	12+6	2	3	2
13	MF	(Azerbaijan) AZE	Shahriyar Rahimov	30	4	27	2	3	2
14	MF	(Azerbaijan) AZE	Fərid Məmmədov	2	0	1+1	0	0	0
15	DF	(Ukraine) UKR	Ihor Korotetskyi	12	1	12	1	0	0
16	MF	(Ukraine) UKR	Giuli Mandzhgaladze	12	0	12	0	0	0
18	MF	(Azerbaijan) AZE	Tural Jalilov	18	0	13+2	0	3	0
20	MF	(Azerbaijan) AZE	Tarzin Jahangirov	13	1	12+1	1	0	0
21	MF	(Azerbaijan) AZE	Murad Sattarli	4	0	3+1	0	0	0
22	GK	(Ukraine) UKR	Serhiy Litovchenko	14	0	14	0	0	0
24	FW	(Trinidad and Tobago) TTO	Shahdon Winchester	8	0	8	0	0	0
48	MF	(Brazil) BRA	Diego Souza	7	0	5+2	0	0	0
91	FW	(Brazil) BRA	Dário	13	4	13	4	0	0
Players who left Kapaz during the season:
5	DF	(Azerbaijan) AZE	Karim Diniyev	15	4	13	4	2	0
7	MF	(Azerbaijan) AZE	Sergey Chernyshev	12	0	3+7	0	1+1	0
8	FW	(Nigeria) NGR	Victor Oseghale	12	1	12	1	0	0
15	DF	(Azerbaijan) AZE	Azad Karimov	7	0	3+4	0	0	0
16	DF	(Azerbaijan) AZE	Azar Mammadov	7	0	6	0	1	0
19	FW	(Azerbaijan) AZE	Aydin Gasimov	3	0	0+2	0	1	0
20	MF	(Mali) MLI	Samba Diallo	13	0	9+2	0	0+2	0
21	DF	(Azerbaijan) AZE	Novruz Mammadov	14	0	14	0	0	0
24	FW	(Azerbaijan) AZE	Magomed Kurbanov	7	0	5+1	0	1	0
26	MF	(Senegal) SEN	Aladji Mansour Ba	4	0	1+2	0	0+1	0

=== Goal scorers ===
Place	Position	Nation	Number	Name	Premier League	Azerbaijan Cup	Total
1	DF	(Azerbaijan)	5	Karim Diniyev	4	0	4
1	FW	(Brazil)	91	Dário	4	0	4
1	DF	(Azerbaijan)	12	Ilyas Safarzade	2	2	4
1	MF	(Azerbaijan)	13	Shahriyar Rahimov	2	2	4
5	FW	(Nigeria)	8	Victor Oseghale	1	0	1
5	DF	(Azerbaijan)	4	Shahriyar Aliyev	1	0	1
5	FW	(Azerbaijan)	9	İlkin Sadıqov	1	0	1
5	MF	(Azerbaijan)	20	Tarzin Jahangirov	1	0	1
5	DF	(Ukraine)	15	Ihor Korotetskyi	1	0	1
5	MF	(Azerbaijan)	11	Kamran Abdullazada	0	1	1
5				Own goal	1	0	1
				TOTALS	18	5	23

=== Disciplinary record ===
Number	Nation	Position	Name	Premier League		Azerbaijan Cup		Total	
Number	Nation	Position	Name	Yellow card	Red card	Yellow card	Red card	Yellow card	Red card
3	(Brazil)	DF	Dedimar Ferreira	3	1	0	0	3	1
4	(Azerbaijan)	DF	Shahriyar Aliyev	9	0	0	0	9	0
6	(Azerbaijan)	MF	Jeyhun Javadov	1	0	0	0	1	0
7	(Azerbaijan)	FW	Roman Huseynov	1	0	0	0	1	0
8	(Azerbaijan)	MF	Samir Zargarov	2	0	0	0	2	0
9	(Azerbaijan)	FW	İlkin Sadıqov	4	0	1	0	5	0
10	(Azerbaijan)	MF	Tural Rzayev	3	0	1	0	4	0
11	(Azerbaijan)	MF	Kamran Abdullazada	3	1	0	0	3	1
12	(Azerbaijan)	DF	Ilyas Safarzade	2	0	1	0	3	0
13	(Azerbaijan)	MF	Shahriyar Rahimov	6	0	2	0	8	0
15	(Ukraine)	DF	Ihor Korotetskyi	1	0	0	0	1	0
16	(Ukraine)	MF	Giuli Mandzhgaladze	7	0	0	0	7	0
18	(Azerbaijan)	MF	Tural Jalilov	2	0	1	0	3	0
20	(Azerbaijan)	MF	Tarzin Jahangirov	1	0	0	0	1	0
21	(Azerbaijan)	MF	Murad Sattarli	1	0	0	0	1	0
48	(Brazil)	MF	Diego Souza	2	0	0	0	2	0
91	(Brazil)	FW	Dário	3	0	0	0	3	0
Players who left Kapaz during the season:
5	(Azerbaijan)	DF	Karim Diniyev	1	0	1	0	2	0
7	(Azerbaijan)	MF	Sergey Chernyshev	1	0	0	0	1	0
8	(Nigeria)	FW	Victor Oseghale	1	0	0	0	1	0
15	(Azerbaijan)	DF	Azad Karimov	1	0	0	0	1	0
16	(Azerbaijan)	DF	Azar Mammadov	1	0	0	0	1	0
20	(Mali)	MF	Samba Diallo	0	0	1	0	1	0
21	(Azerbaijan)	DF	Novruz Mammadov	3	0	0	0	3	0
			TOTALS	59	2	8	0	67	2
