= List of Azerbaijan football transfers winter 2019–20 =

This is a list of Azerbaijan football transfers in the winter transfer window, 7 January - 3 February 2020, by club. Only clubs of the 2019–20 Azerbaijan Premier League are included.

== Azerbaijan Premier League 2019-20 ==
=== Gabala ===
In: Note: Flags indicate national team as defined under FIFA eligibility rules; some limited exceptions apply. Players may hold more than one non-FIFA nationality.

No.	Pos.	Nation	Player
9	MF	AZE	Ehtiram Shahverdiyev (from (Azerbaijan) Sumgayit)
12	MF	FRA	Abdelrafik Gérard (from (Belgium) Union SG)
17	MF	TOG	Yaovi Akakpo (free agent)
22	FW	CHI	Rodrigo Gattas (from (Canada) York9)
32	FW	SVN	Nicolas Rajsel (from (Belgium) Oostende)

Out: Note: Flags indicate national team as defined under FIFA eligibility rules; some limited exceptions apply. Players may hold more than one non-FIFA nationality.

No.	Pos.	Nation	Player
6	MF	SEN	Ibrahima Niasse (to (Greece) PAS Lamia)
9	FW	GEO	Davit Volkovi (to (Azerbaijan) Zira)
13	FW	CIV	Christian Kouakou

=== Keşla ===
In: Note: Flags indicate national team as defined under FIFA eligibility rules; some limited exceptions apply. Players may hold more than one non-FIFA nationality.

No.	Pos.	Nation	Player
8	MF	AZE	Murad Agayev (from (Azerbaijan) Sabail)
30	MF	UZB	Shohrux Gadoyev (from (Uzbekistan) Bunyodkor)
42	FW	ANG	Alexander Christovão (from (Saudi Arabia) Al-Mujazzal)

Out: Note: Flags indicate national team as defined under FIFA eligibility rules; some limited exceptions apply. Players may hold more than one non-FIFA nationality.

No.	Pos.	Nation	Player
14	MF	AZE	Emin Mehtiyev (to (Azerbaijan) Sabail-2)
16	GK	AZE	Shahin Zakiyev (to (Azerbaijan) Sabail-2)
66	DF	AZE	Murad Gayali (to (Azerbaijan) Sabail)

=== Neftchi Baku ===
In: Note: Flags indicate national team as defined under FIFA eligibility rules; some limited exceptions apply. Players may hold more than one non-FIFA nationality.

No.	Pos.	Nation	Player
22	FW	AZE	Mirabdulla Abbasov (loan return from (Azerbaijan) Sabail)
55	FW	AZE	Ibrahim Aliyev (from (Azerbaijan) Sumgayit)
88	MF	IRN	Saman Nariman Jahan (from (Iran) Machine Sazi)

Out: Note: Flags indicate national team as defined under FIFA eligibility rules; some limited exceptions apply. Players may hold more than one non-FIFA nationality.

No.	Pos.	Nation	Player
19	FW	AZE	Rauf Aliyev (to (Azerbaijan) Sabail)
25	DF	UKR	Kyrylo Petrov (to (Ukraine) Kolos)

=== Qarabağ ===
In: Note: Flags indicate national team as defined under FIFA eligibility rules; some limited exceptions apply. Players may hold more than one non-FIFA nationality.

No.	Pos.	Nation	Player
27	FW	GHA	Owusu Kwabena (from (Spain) Leganés)
94	GK	AZE	Nijat Mehbaliyev (loan return from (Azerbaijan) Sumgayit)

Out: Note: Flags indicate national team as defined under FIFA eligibility rules; some limited exceptions apply. Players may hold more than one non-FIFA nationality.

No.	Pos.	Nation	Player
1	GK	BIH	Asmir Begović (loan return to (England) Bournemouth)
6	MF	BUL	Simeon Slavchev (to (Bulgaria) Levski Sofia)
10	MF	ESP	Dani Quintana (to (China) Chengdu Better City)
20	MF	AZE	Richard Almeida (loan return to (Kazakhstan) Astana)
45	DF	AZE	Rauf Huseynli (loan to (Azerbaijan) Zira)

=== Sabah ===
In: Note: Flags indicate national team as defined under FIFA eligibility rules; some limited exceptions apply. Players may hold more than one non-FIFA nationality.

No.	Pos.	Nation	Player
9	FW	UKR	Marko Dević (from (Serbia) Voždovac)
18	FW	PAR	Julio Rodríguez (from (Azerbaijan) Zira)
20	MF	MDA	Eugeniu Cociuc (from (Azerbaijan) Sabail)
22	MF	AZE	Elgun Nabiyev (loan return from (Azerbaijan) Sumgayit)
30	MF	CRO	Mario Marina (from (Croatia) Gorica)
99	FW	AZE	Ramil Sheydayev (from (Russia) Dynamo Moscow)

Out: Note: Flags indicate national team as defined under FIFA eligibility rules; some limited exceptions apply. Players may hold more than one non-FIFA nationality.

No.	Pos.	Nation	Player
21	FW	HON	Roger Rojas (to (Colombia) Deportes Tolima)
27	MF	RSA	Hendrick Ekstein (to (Azerbaijan) Sabail)

=== Sabail ===
In: Note: Flags indicate national team as defined under FIFA eligibility rules; some limited exceptions apply. Players may hold more than one non-FIFA nationality.

No.	Pos.	Nation	Player
8	MF	COD	Lema Mabidi (from (Morocco) Raja Casablanca)
11	FW	AZE	Rauf Aliyev (from (Azerbaijan) Neftçi)
16	DF	IRN	Peyman Keshavarz (free agent)
27	MF	RSA	Hendrick Ekstein (from (Azerbaijan) Sabah)
30	DF	AZE	Murad Gayali (from (Azerbaijan) Keşla)

Out: Note: Flags indicate national team as defined under FIFA eligibility rules; some limited exceptions apply. Players may hold more than one non-FIFA nationality.

No.	Pos.	Nation	Player
8	MF	MDA	Eugeniu Cociuc (to (Azerbaijan) Sabah)
10	FW	AZE	Aghabala Ramazanov (to (Azerbaijan) Zira)
16	DF	UKR	Ihor Korotetskyi
22	FW	AZE	Mirabdulla Abbasov (loan return to (Azerbaijan) Neftçi)
32	DF	AZE	Elvin Yunuszade (to (Bosnia and Herzegovina) Čelik Zenica)
88	MF	AZE	Orkhan Gurbanli (loan to (Latvia) Daugavpils)

=== Sumgayit ===
In: Note: Flags indicate national team as defined under FIFA eligibility rules; some limited exceptions apply. Players may hold more than one non-FIFA nationality.

No.	Pos.	Nation	Player

Out: Note: Flags indicate national team as defined under FIFA eligibility rules; some limited exceptions apply. Players may hold more than one non-FIFA nationality.

No.	Pos.	Nation	Player
7	MF	AZE	Ehtiram Shahverdiyev (to (Azerbaijan) Gabala)
11	MF	AZE	Elgun Nabiyev (loan return to (Azerbaijan) Sabah)
12	GK	AZE	Nijat Mehbaliyev (loan return to (Azerbaijan) Qarabağ)
49	FW	AZE	Ibrahim Aliyev (to (Azerbaijan) Neftçi)

=== Zira ===
In: Note: Flags indicate national team as defined under FIFA eligibility rules; some limited exceptions apply. Players may hold more than one non-FIFA nationality.

No.	Pos.	Nation	Player
3	DF	SLE	Alie Sesay (from (Bulgaria) Arda Kardzhali)
10	FW	AZE	Aghabala Ramazanov (from (Azerbaijan) Sabail)
11	FW	GEO	Davit Volkovi (from (Azerbaijan) Gabala)
12	GK	AZE	Emil Balayev (from (Kazakhstan) Tobol)
18	MF	MDA	Gheorghe Anton (from (Moldova) Sheriff Tiraspol)
20	MF	AZE	Ali Shirinov (free agent)
33	DF	SRB	Jovan Krneta (from (Greece) Levadiakos)
55	DF	AZE	Rauf Huseynli (loan from (Azerbaijan) Qarabağ)

Out: Note: Flags indicate national team as defined under FIFA eligibility rules; some limited exceptions apply. Players may hold more than one non-FIFA nationality.

No.	Pos.	Nation	Player
10	MF	AZE	Elvin Mammadov
11	FW	HAI	Sony Norde (to (Malaysia) Melaka United)
17	FW	MWI	Robin Ngalande
18	FW	PAR	Julio Rodríguez (to (Azerbaijan) Sabah)
