= 2017–18 Azerbaijan Cup =

Tournament details
- Country: Azerbaijan
- Teams: 18

Final positions
- Champions: Keşla
- Runners-up: Gabala

Tournament statistics
- Matches played: 24
- Goals scored: 68 (2.83 per match)
- Top goal scorer: Filip Ozobić (4)

The 2017–18 Azerbaijan Cup was the 26th season of the annual cup competition in Azerbaijan. The final was played on 28 May 2018.

== First round ==
The first round games were drawn on 6 October 2017.

11 October 2017 Match 1	Ağsu (2)	0–1	Mil-Muğan (2)	Agsu
15:00 AZST (UTC+5)		Report	V.Alibabayev (yellow card) 78'; V.Mehraliyev 80'; A.Babazade (yellow card) 82'	Stadium: Agsu City Stadium; Attendance: 80; Referee: Ravan Hamzazade

11 October 2017 Match 2	MOIK Baku (2)	2–1	Turan-Tovuz (2)	Baku
15:00 AZST (UTC+5)	I.Ibrahimli 15'; T.Muradov (yellow card) 34'; M.Aliyev (yellow card) 57'; G.Ibrahimov 85'	Report	E.Samadov 41'; E.Taghiyev (yellow card) 81'	Stadium: FC Baku Training Base; Attendance: 100; Referee: Orkhan Mammadov

== Second round ==
The two winners of the first round progressed to the Second round, which was also drawn on 6 October 2017.

29 November 2017 Match 3	Gabala (1)	8–0	Mil-Muğan (2)	Gabala
14:00 AZT (UTC+4)	Huseynov 30' (pen.); Qurbanov 42'; Ozobić 45+1', 58', 84'; U.Isgandarov 52'; H.Hajiyev (yellow card) 64' (goal) 85'; Ehiosun 73'	Report	J.Hasanov (yellow card) 29'; A.Babazade (yellow card) 45'; S.Babayev (yellow card) 55' (yellow-red card) 83'; V.Mehraliyev (yellow card) 75'; E.Mammadov (yellow card) 77'	Stadium: Gabala City Stadium; Attendance: 400; Referee: Ziya Nasirov

29 November 2017 Match 4	Shuvalan (2)	1–2	Sabail (1)	Baku
13:30 AZT (UTC+4)	E.Hasanaliyev 10'; T.Narimanov (yellow card) 79'; O.Safiyaroglu (yellow card) 81'; M.Hashimli (yellow card) 86'; V.Abdullayev (yellow card) 88'	Report	A.Huseynov 60' (yellow card) 81'; N.Novruzov (yellow card) 67'; Statie 78'	Stadium: AZAL Arena; Attendance: 100; Referee: Fariz Yusifov

29 November 2017 Match 10	Zira (1)	3–0	Khazar Baku (2)	Baku
16:00 AZT (UTC+4)	A.Shemonayev (yellow card) 30'; S.Guliyev (yellow card) 45'; Isgandarli 58', 83'; O.Aliyev 80'; M.Bayramov (yellow card) 86'	Report	E.Rəhimzadə (yellow card) 62'; M.Teymurov (yellow card) 72'	Stadium: Zira Olympic Sport Complex Stadium; Attendance: 500; Referee: Orkhan Mammadov

28 November 2017 Match 5	Neftchi Baku (1)	5–0	Zagatala (2)	Baku
17:00 AZT (UTC+4)	Segovia 8', 35', 54'; A.Krivotsyuk (yellow card) 24'; Bargas 50'; Mahmudov 59'	Report	E.Süleymanov (yellow card) 24'	Stadium: Bakcell Arena; Attendance: 300; Referee: Rashad Ahmadov

29 November 2017 Match 6	MOIK Baku (2)	0–3	Keşla (1)	Baku
13:30 AZT (UTC+4)	J.Hacıyev (yellow card) 41'	Report	Scarlatache 41'; Fardjad-Azad (yellow card) 43'; M.Abbasov 65'; M.Gayaly (yellow card) 79'; R.Maharramli 80'	Stadium: FC Baku Training Base; Attendance: 200; Referee: Ravan Hamzazade

29 November 2017 Match 7	Kapaz (1)	3–0	Bine (2)	Baku
13:30 AZT (UTC+4)	S.Rahimov (yellow card) 39' (goal) 83' (pen.); T.Rzayev (yellow card) 59'; K.Diniyev (yellow card) 65'; I.Safarzade 66', 71'	Report	B.Soltanov (yellow card) 62'; J.Rähimli (yellow card) 83'	Stadium: Dalga Arena; Attendance: 50; Referee: Nail Naghiyev

28 November 2017 Match 8	Qarabağ (1)	2–0	Qaradağ Lökbatan (2)	Baku
16:00 AZT (UTC+4)	Ismayilov 57'; Henrique 81'	Report	M.Rahimov (yellow card) 66'	Stadium: Azersun Arena; Attendance: 900; Referee: Ramil Diniyev

29 November 2017 Match 9	Sumgayit (1)	3–0	Sabah (2)	Sumgayit
16:00 AZT (UTC+4)	K.Mirzayev 49'; Yunanov 68', 73'; B.Hasanalizade (yellow card) 77'	Report		Stadium: Kapital Bank Arena; Attendance: 300; Referee: Elvin Asgarov

== Quarter-finals ==
The eight winners from the second round are drawn into four two-legged ties.

11 December 2017 Match 11 1st leg	Gabala (1)	1–0	Sabail (1)	Gabala
16:00 AZT (UTC+4)	Joseph-Monrose 59'; J.Huseynov (penalty missed) 76'; Stanković (yellow card) 90+3'	Report		Stadium: Gabala City Stadium; Attendance: 400; Referee: Ravan Hamzazade

15 December 2017 Match 11 2nd leg	Sabail (1)	2–4 (2–5 agg.)	Gabala (1)	Baku
16:00 AZT (UTC+4)	Popovici 16'; Nadirov (yellow card) 37'; Tagaýew 78'	Report	Ozobić 22'; Qurbanov (yellow card) 24' (goal) 44'; Koné 56' (yellow card) 59'; Dabo 75'; Abbasov (yellow card) 77'	Stadium: Bayil Arena; Attendance: 250; Referee: Ingilab Mammadov

10 December 2017 Match 12 1st leg	Zira (1)	1–0	Neftchi Baku (1)	Baku
16:00 AZT (UTC+4)	Mustafayev (yellow card) 40'; A.Shemonayev (yellow card) 43'; S.Guliyev (yellow card) 60'; Manga 86'; Gadze (yellow card) 88'	Report	Abışov (yellow card) 88'; Mirzabeyov (yellow card) 90+1'	Stadium: Zira Olympic Sport Complex Stadium; Attendance: 1,000; Referee: Ingilab Mammadov

14 December 2017 Match 12 2nd leg	Neftchi Baku (1)	2–0 (2–1 agg.)	Zira (1)	Baku
19:00 AZT (UTC+4)	Bargas 37'; M.Abbasov 45+2'	Report		Stadium: Bakcell Arena; Referee: Fariz Yusifov

10 December 2017 Match 13 1st leg	Keşla (1)	2–0	Kapaz (1)	Baku
14:00 AZT (UTC+4)	Fardjad-Azad 18'; R.Məhərrəmli 41'; Guliyev (yellow card) 58'; Scarlatache (yellow card) 62'; S.Alkhasov (yellow card) 62'; M.Abbasov (yellow card) 69'; F.Bayramov (yellow card) 81'	Report	Jalilov (yellow card) 39'; I.Safarzade (yellow card) 90+2'	Stadium: Inter Arena; Attendance: 1,000; Referee: Rauf Jabbarov

14 December 2017 Match 13 2nd leg	Kapaz (1)	2–3 (2–5 agg.)	Keşla (1)	Ganja
AZT (UTC+4)	I.Sadigov (yellow card) 36'; S.Rahimov 48' (yellow card) 90+4'; S.Diallo (yellow card) 68'; K.Abdullazade 80'	Report	M.Abbasov 34', 85'; Fardjad-Azad 82'; E.Aliyev (yellow card) 90+1'	Stadium: Ganja City Stadium; Attendance: 700; Referee: Orkhan Mammadov

11 December 2017 Match 14 1st leg	Qarabağ (1)	2–1	Sumgayit (1)	Baku
19:00 AZT (UTC+4)	Richard 57'; Henrique 85'	Report	Eyyubov 23'; A.Salahli (yellow card) 51'; Valiyev (red card) 88'	Stadium: Azersun Arena; Attendance: 450; Referee: Ramil Diniyev

15 December 2017 Match 14 2nd leg	Sumgayit (1)	2–0 (3–2 agg.)	Qarabağ (1)	Sumqayit
19:00 AZT (UTC+4)	K.Mirzayev 22'; B.Hasanalizade (yellow card) 51'; M.Cənnətov (yellow card) 88'; Yunanov 90' (yellow card) 90'	Report	Guerrier (yellow card) 58'; Rzeźniczak (yellow card) 63'; Míchel (yellow card) 87'	Stadium: Kapital Bank Arena; Attendance: 1,326; Referee: Rahim Hasanov

== Semi-finals ==
The four winners from the quarter-finals were drawn into two two-legged ties.

12 April 2018 Match 15 1st leg	Gabala (1)	1–2	Neftchi Baku (1)	Qabala
19:00 AZST (UTC+5)	Ozobić (yellow card) 68'; G.Aliyev (yellow card) 88'; Joseph-Monrose 90+1'	Report	Gómez 29'; Alaskarov 45' (yellow card) 86'; R.Azizli (yellow card) 90+3'	Stadium: Gabala City Stadium; Attendance: 2,800; Referee: Ingilab Məmmədov

18 April 2018 Match 15 2nd leg	Neftchi Baku (1)	1–3 (3–4 agg.)	Gabala (1)	Baku
AZST (UTC+5)	Mustivar 9'; Meza (yellow card) 46'; Abışov (yellow card) 59'; Herrera (yellow card) 84'	Report	Dabo 20', 30'; Abbasov (yellow card) 38'; Joseph-Monrose (yellow card) 41'; Qurbanov (yellow card) 45'; Huseynov 60' (pen.); Ramaldanov (yellow card) 88'	Stadium: Bakcell Arena; Attendance: 6,000; Referee: Rauf Jabbarov

12 April 2018 Match 16 1st leg	Keşla (1)	1–0	Sumgayit (1)	Baku
17:00 AZST (UTC+5)	Javadov (yellow card) 58'; Meza 90+2'	Report	V.Beybalayev (yellow card) 20'; E.Shahverdiyev (yellow card) 85'	Stadium: Inter Arena; Attendance: 800; Referee: Rahim Həsənov

18 April 2018 Match 16 2nd leg	Sumgayit (1)	1–1 (1–2 agg.)	Keşla (1)	Sumqayit
18:00 AZST (UTC+5)	Imamverdiyev 64'; B.Hasanalizade (yellow card) 72'; V.Beybalayev (yellow card) 81'	Report	Sohna (yellow card) 50'; Meza 61'; F.Bayramov (yellow card) 65'	Stadium: Kapital Bank Arena; Attendance: 1,300; Referee: Aliyar Ağayev

== Final ==
28 May 2018
21:00 AZST (UTC+4)

Keşla (1)	1–0	Gabala (1)
Fardjad-Azad 71'	Report

Gabala City Stadium, Gabala
Attendance: 4,500
Referee: Rauf Jabarov

== Scorers ==
4 goals:

- (Croatia) Filip Ozobić

3 goals:

- (France) Bagaliy Dabo
- (Azerbaijan) Mirsahib Abbasov
- (Azerbaijan) Pardis Fardjad-Azad
- (Azerbaijan) Amil Yunanov
- (Spain) Daniel Segovia

2 goals:

- (Azerbaijan) Javid Huseynov
- (Azerbaijan) Ruslan Qurbanov
- (France) Steeven Joseph-Monrose
- (Azerbaijan) Ilyas Safarzade
- (Azerbaijan) Shahriyar Rahimov
- (Azerbaijan) Rafael Maharramli
- (Paraguay) César Meza Colli
- (Argentina) Hugo Bargas
- (Brazil) Pedro Henrique
- (Azerbaijan) Kamal Mirzayev
- (Azerbaijan) Vusal Isgandarli

1 goals:

- (Azerbaijan) Hajiaga Hajiyev
- (Azerbaijan) Ulvi Isgandarov
- (Mali) Famoussa Koné
- (Nigeria) Ekigho Ehiosun
- (Azerbaijan) Kamran Abdullazade
- (Romania) Adrian Scarlatache
- (Azerbaijan) Vasif Mehraliyev
- (Azerbaijan) Ismayil Ibrahimli
- (Azerbaijan) Garib Ibrahimov
- (Argentina) Lucas Gómez
- (Azerbaijan) Mirabdulla Abbasov
- (Azerbaijan) Namik Alaskarov
- (Azerbaijan) Emin Mahmudov
- (Haiti) Soni Mustivar
- (Azerbaijan) Afran Ismayilov
- (Azerbaijan) Richard
- (Azerbaijan) Aslan Huseynov
- (Curaçao) Ayrton Statie
- (Romania) Alexandru Popovici
- (Turkmenistan) Elman Tagaýew
- (Azerbaijan) Elvin Hasanaliev
- (Azerbaijan) Rashad Eyyubov
- (Azerbaijan) Javid Imamverdiyev
- (Azerbaijan) Elnur Samadov
- (Azerbaijan) Orkhan Aliyev
- (Central African Republic) David Manga
