= Aladji Mansour Ba =

Senegalese footballer

Personal information
- Date of birth: 11 November 1989 (age 37)
- Place of birth: Senegal
- Position: Midfielder

Team information
- Current team: Shanghai Shenxin
- Number: 32

Senior career*
| Years | Team | Apps | (Gls) |
| 2012–2013 | ASC Linguère | | |
| 2014–2015 | ASC Diaraf | | |
| 2015–2017 | KAC Kénitra | 47 | (6) |
| 2017 | Kapaz | 3 | (0) |
| 2019– | Shanghai Shenxin | 5 | (1) |
- * Club domestic league appearances and goals as of 3 December 2019

Aladji Mansour Ba (born 11 November 1989) is a Senegalese professional footballer who plays as a midfielder, most recently for Azerbaijan Premier League club Kapaz PFK. Previously, Ba played for ASC Linguère and ASC Diaraf in Senegal.

== Career ==
On 27 October 2017, Ba signed for Azerbaijan Premier League side Kapaz PFK until the end of the 2017–18 season. On 21 December 2017, Kapaz announced that they had parted ways with Ba.

== Career statistics ==
As of match played 14 September 2019

Appearances and goals by club, season and competition
| Club | Season | League | | | National cup | | Continental | | Other | | Total | |
| Club | Season | Division | Apps | Goals | Apps | Goals | Apps | Goals | Apps | Goals | Apps | Goals |
|---|---|---|---|---|---|---|---|---|---|---|---|---|
| KAC Kénitra | 2015–16 | Botola | 28 | 2 | | | – | | – | | 28 | 2 |
| KAC Kénitra | 2016–17 | Botola | 19 | 4 | | | – | | – | | 19 | 4 |
| KAC Kénitra | Total | | 47 | 6 | | | 0 | 0 | 0 | 0 | 47 | 6 |
| Kapaz | 2017–18 | Azerbaijan Premier League | 3 | 0 | 1 | 0 | – | | – | | 4 | 0 |
| Shanghai Shenxin | 2019 | China League One | 5 | 1 | 0 | 0 | – | | – | | 5 | 1 |
| Career total | | | 55 | 7 | 1 | 0 | 0 | 0 | 0 | 0 | 56 | 7 |
