= 2017–18 Azerbaijan Premier League =

Azerbaijan Premier League
- Season: 2017–18
- Dates: 11 August 2017 – 19 May 2018
- Champions: Qarabağ
- Relegated: Kapaz
- Champions League: Qarabağ
- Europa League: Gabala; Neftçi Baku; Keşla
- Matches: 112
- Goals: 255 (2.28 per match)
- Top goalscorer: Bagaliy Dabo (13 goals)
- Biggest home win: Qarabağ 4–1 Sumgayit (22 September 2017)
- Biggest away win: Kapaz 1–6 Gabala (25 November 2017)
- Highest scoring: Kapaz 1–6 Gabala (25 November 2017)
- Highest attendance: 13,300; Kapaz 0–2 Qarabağ (5 November 2017)
- All statistics correct as of 21 May 2018.

The 2017–18 Azerbaijan Premier League was the 26th season of the Azerbaijan Premier League. The season began on 11 August 2017 and ended on 19 May 2018.

Although unconfirmed by UEFA, it was expected that the winners of the league this season would earn a spot in the first qualifying round of the 2018–19 UEFA Champions League, and the second and third placed clubs would earn a place in the first qualifying round of the 2018–19 UEFA Europa League.

Qarabağ were the defending champions, who retained the title by winning the championship for the fifth consecutive year.

== Teams ==
Shuvalan was relegated at the conclusion of the previous season. Sabail were promoted and participated in the Premier League this season.

Locations of the 2017–18 Azerbaijan Premier League teams.
Team in italics is from a zone of the Nagorno-Karabakh conflict and is playing its home games in Baku.

=== Stadia and locations ===
Note: Table lists in alphabetical order.

Team	Location	Venue	Capacity
Gabala	Qabala	Gabala City Stadium	4,500
Keşla	Keshla	Inter Arena	8,125
Kapaz	Ganja	Ganja City Stadium	25,000
Neftchi Baku	Baku	Bakcell Arena	10,500
Qarabağ	Baku	Azersun Arena	5,800
Sabail	Səbail	Bayil Arena	5,000
Sumgayit	Sumqayit	Kapital Bank Arena	1,500
Zira	Baku	Zira Olympic Sport Complex Stadium	1,400

=== Stadiums ===
Gabala	Keşla	Kapaz	Neftchi Baku
Gabala City Stadium	Inter Arena	Ganja City Stadium	Bakcell Arena
Capacity: 4,500	Capacity: 8,125	Capacity: 25,000	Capacity: 10,500
		Ganja Stadium	Tofiq Bahramov Stadium
Qarabağ	Sabail	Sumgayit	Zira
Azersun Arena	Bayil Arena	Kapital Bank Arena	Zira Olympic Sport Complex Stadium
Capacity: 5,800	Capacity: 5,000	Capacity: 1,500	Capacity: 1,400
		Stadium	

=== Personnel and kits ===
Note: Flags indicate national team as has been defined under FIFA eligibility rules. Players may hold more than one non-FIFA nationality.

Team	Manager	Team captain	Kit manufacturer	Shirt sponsor
Gabala	(Ukraine) Roman Hryhorchuk	(Azerbaijan) Javid Huseynov	Joma	QafqaZ Hotels
Keşla	(Ukraine) Yuriy Maksymov	(Azerbaijan) Kamran Aghayev	Joma	Samaya LTD
Neftchi Baku	(Azerbaijan) Tarlan Ahmadov	(Azerbaijan) Ruslan Abışov	Kappa	
Qarabağ	(Azerbaijan) Gurban Gurbanov	(Azerbaijan) Rashad Sadygov	Adidas	Azersun
Sabail	(Azerbaijan) Samir Aliyev	(Azerbaijan) Eltun Yagublu	Nike	
Sumgayit	(Azerbaijan) Samir Abbasov	(Azerbaijan) Vurğun Hüseynov	Joma	Pasha Insurance
Zira	(Azerbaijan) Aykhan Abbasov	(Azerbaijan) Anar Nazirov	Joma	Santral Electric
Kapaz	(Azerbaijan) Yunis Huseynov	(Azerbaijan) Shahriyar Rahimov	Nike	Gəncə 4000

=== Managerial changes ===
Team	Outgoing manager	Manner of departure	Date of vacancy	Position in table	Incoming manager	Date of appointmentr
Neftchi Baku	(Azerbaijan) Elkhan Abdullayev	Resigned	21 August 2017	7th	(Azerbaijan) Elshad Ahmedov (Caretaker)	21 August 2017
Neftchi Baku	(Azerbaijan) Elshad Ahmedov (Caretaker)	End of tenure as caretaker	11 September 2017	7th	(Azerbaijan) Tarlan Ahmadov	11 September 2017
Keşla	(Georgia (country)) Zaur Svanadze	Resigned	29 October 2017	7th	(Azerbaijan) Ramiz Mammadov (Caretaker)	30 October 2017
Kapaz	(Azerbaijan) Shahin Diniyev	Resigned	18 November 2017	8th	(Azerbaijan) Yunis Huseynov	20 November 2017
Keşla	(Azerbaijan) Ramiz Mammadov (Caretaker)	End of tenure as caretaker	25 December 2017	7th	(Ukraine) Yuriy Maksymov	25 December 2017

== League table ==
Pos	Team	Pld	W	D	L	GF	GA	GD	Pts	Qualification or relegation
1	Qarabağ (C)	28	20	5	3	37	13	+24	65	Qualification for the Champions League first qualifying round
2	Gabala	28	14	7	7	43	26	+17	49	Qualification for the Europa League first qualifying round
3	Neftçi Baku	28	14	4	10	39	28	+11	46	Qualification for the Europa League first qualifying round
4	Zira	28	12	8	8	36	30	+6	44	
5	Sumgayit	28	11	7	10	34	33	+1	40	
6	Keşla	28	8	7	13	29	39	−10	31	Qualification for the Europa League first qualifying round (Note: Keşla qualified for the Europa League first qualifying round by winning 2017–18 Azerbaijan Cup.)
7	Səbail	28	6	5	17	19	39	−20	23	
8	Kapaz (R)	28	3	5	20	18	47	−29	14	Relegation to the Azerbaijan First Division

Source: UEFA, Soccerway
Rules for classification: 1) Points; 2) Head-to-head points; 3) Head-to-head goal difference; 4) Head-to-head goals scored; 5) Head-to-head away goals scored (only if two teams); 6) Goal difference; 7) Goals scored.
(C) Champions; (R) Relegated

== Results ==
Clubs will play each other four times for a total of 28 matches each.

=== Games 1–14 ===
Home \ Away	GAB	KAP	KES	NEF	QAR	SEB	SUM	ZIR
Gabala	—	0–2	3–0	2–1	1–0	3–1	1–0	1–1
Kapaz	1–6	—	0–1	0–1	0–2	2–3	0–3	0–3
Keşla	1–2	3–2	—	0–2	0–2	1–0	1–1	0–1
Neftçi Baku	2–3	0–0	3–1	—	1–3	2–0	2–1	1–2
Qarabağ	2–1	2–0	1–0	1–0	—	1–0	4–1	0–0
Sabail	1–3	1–0	1–0	1–0	0–2	—	0–2	0–1
Sumgayit	0–1	2–1	3–1	1–0	1–1	0–0	—	2–1
Zira	2–1	3–0	1–1	1–0	2–3	2–1	3–1	—

Legend: Blue = home team win; Yellow = draw; Red = away team win.

=== Games 15–28 ===
Home \ Away	GAB	KAP	KES	NEF	QAR	SEB	SUM	ZIR
Gabala	—	3–0	1–1	1–2	0–1	1–1	1–1	2–1
Kapaz	0–1	—	1–1	1–2	0–1	2–1	1–1	0–0
Keşla	1–1	0–2	—	2–1	3–0	1–1	1–2	2–1
Neftçi Baku	1–0	1–0	3–2	—	0–0	3–1	2–2	1–1
Qarabağ	0–0	1–0	1–1	0–1	—	1–0	2–0	2–0
Sabail	2–1	1–1	0–1	0–4	0–1	—	0–1	0–1
Sumgayit	0–2	2–1	2–1	2–0	0–1	1–2	—	1–2
Zira	1–1	2–1	1–2	0–3	1–2	1–1	1–1	—

Legend: Blue = home team win; Yellow = draw; Red = away team win.

== Season statistics ==
=== Top scorers ===
As of match played 21 May 2018

Rank	Player	Club	Goals
1	(France) Bagaliy Dabo	Gabala	13
2	(Azerbaijan) Amil Yunanov	Sumgayit	10
3	(France) Steeven Joseph-Monrose	Gabala	9
4	(Azerbaijan) Mahir Madatov	Qarabağ	8
4	(Chile) Ignacio Herrera	Neftçi	8
6	(Ghana) Richard Gadze	Zira	7
7	(Mali) Famoussa Koné	Gabala	6
7	(Azerbaijan) Richard Almeida	Qarabağ	6
7	(Azerbaijan) Javid Imamverdiyev	Sumgayit	6
7	(Azerbaijan) Rahman Hajiyev	Neftçi	6
11	(Azerbaijan) Vusal Isgandarli	Zira	5
11	(South Africa) Dino Ndlovu	Qarabağ	5
11	(Azerbaijan) Mirabdulla Abbasov	Neftçi	5
11	(Croatia) Filip Ozobić	Gabala	5
11	(Serbia) Milan Đurić	Zira	5
11	(Azerbaijan) Ruslan Abışov	Neftçi	5
11	(Spain) Dani Quintana	Qarabağ	5

=== Clean sheets ===
Updated to matches played on 21 May 2018.

Rank	Player	Club	Clean sheets
1	(Bosnia and Herzegovina) Ibrahim Šehić	Qarabağ	13
2	(Ukraine) Dmytro Bezotosnyi	Gabala	9
3	(Azerbaijan) Rashad Azizli	Neftçi	6
3	(Azerbaijan) Farhad Valiyev	Sumgayit	6

=== Scoring ===
- First goal of the season: Mahir Madatov for Qarabağ against Neftçi Baku. (11 August 2017)
- Fastest goal of the season: 26th second,
  - Bagaliy Dabo for Gabala against Kapaz (25 November 2017)

== See also ==
- Azerbaijan Premier League
