= Seymur Asadov =

Azerbaijani footballer (born 1994)

Personal information
- Full name: Seymur Nizami oglu Asadov
- Date of birth: 5 May 1994 (age 32)
- Place of birth: Baku, Azerbaijan
- Height: 1.75 m (5 ft 9 in)
- Position: Midfielder

Senior career*
Years	Team	Apps	(Gls)
2012–2014	Gabala	1	(0)
2014–2015	Shuvalan	26	(1)
2016–2017	Sumgayit	14	(1)
2017	Sabail	0	(0)
2018–2021	Keşla	6	(0)
- * Club domestic league appearances and goals

Seymur Asadov (Azerbaijani: Seymur Əsədov; born on 5 May 1994) is an Azerbaijani former football midfielder.

== Club career ==
On 11 May 2012, Asadov made his debut in the Azerbaijan Premier League for Gabala match against Neftçi Baku.
