= Sergey Chernyshev (footballer) =

Azerbaijani footballer (born 2000)

Personal information
- Full name: Sergey Sergeyevich Chernyshev
- Date of birth: 27 April 1990 (age 36)
- Place of birth: Shebekino, Russian SFSR
- Height: 1.72 m (5 ft 8 in)
- Positions: Midfielder; forward

Youth career
- Rostov

Senior career*
Years	Team	Apps	(Gls)
2007	Rostov	0	(0)
2008	Rostov-2 (D4)		
2009	Rostov	0	(0)
2010	Taganrog	12	(1)
2011	Mughan	12	(0)
2011–2012	Ravan Baku	14	(0)
2012	Turan Tovuz	1	(0)
2013–2014	Taganrog	63	(10)
2015	Dynamo GTS Stavropol	28	(3)
2016	Lokomotiv Liski	7	(1)
2016	Druzhba Maykop	15	(2)
2017	Sumgayit	9	(1)
2017–2018	Kapaz	10	(0)
2018	SKA Rostov-on-Don	11	(2)

International career
2011	Azerbaijan U21	2	(0)
- * Club domestic league appearances and goals as of 27 May 2018

Sergey Sergeyevich Chernyshev (Azerbaijani: Sergey Çernışev; born 27 April 1990) is an Azerbaijani professional footballer who plays as a midfielder or forward.

== Career ==
Chernyshev played for the FC Rostov (reserves), FC Rostov-2, FC Taganrog and FK Mughan.

In January 2017, Chernyshev joined Sumgayit, before joining Kapaz PFK in July 2017. On 2 January 2018, Kapaz announced that Chernyshev had left the club by mutual consent.

== Career statistics ==
=== Club ===
As of match played 10 December 2017

Appearances and goals by club, season and competition
Club	Season	League			National Cup		Continental		Other		Total	
Club	Season	Division	Apps	Goals	Apps	Goals	Apps	Goals	Apps	Goals	Apps	Goals
Taganrog	2010	Russian Second Division	12	1			–		–		12	1
Mughan	2010–11	Azerbaijan Premier League	12	0			–		–		12	0
Ravan Baku	2011–12	Azerbaijan Premier League	14	0	0	0	–		–		14	0
Turan-Tovuz	2012–13	Azerbaijan Premier League	1	0	0	0	–		–		1	0
Taganrog	2012–13	Professional Football League	9	0			–		–		9	0
Taganrog	2013–14	Professional Football League	29	5			–		–		29	5
Taganrog	2014–15	Professional Football League	13	4	3	2	–		–		16	6
Taganrog	Total		51	9	3	2	-	-	-	-	54	11
Dynamo GTS Stavropol	2014–15	Professional Football League	14	2	0	0	–		–		14	2
Dynamo GTS Stavropol	2015–16	Professional Football League	14	1	2	0	–		–		16	1
Dynamo GTS Stavropol	Total		28	3	2	0	-	-	-	-	30	3
Lokomotiv Liski	2015–16	Professional Football League	7	1	0	0	–		–		7	1
Druzhba Maykop	2016–17	Professional Football League	15	2	0	0	–		–		15	2
Sumgayit	2016–17	Azerbaijan Premier League	9	1	0	0	–		–		9	1
Kapaz	2017–18	Azerbaijan Premier League	10	0	2	0	–		–		12	0
Career total			159	17	7	2	-	-	-	-	166	19
