= Nurlan Novruzov =

Azerbaijani footballer (born 1993)

Personal information
- Full name: Nurlan Zahid oglu Novruzov
- Date of birth: 3 March 1993 (age 33)
- Place of birth: Baku, Azerbaijan
- Height: 1.71 m (5 ft 7 in)
- Position: Forward

Youth career
- Baku

Senior career*
Years	Team	Apps	(Gls)
2011–2015	Baku	85	(37)
2013–2014	→ Sumgayit (loan)	18	(10)
2015–2017	Zira	58	(17)
2017–2018	Sabail	28	(12)
2018	Dersim 62 Spor	17	(10)
2019	Şanlıurfa BB	17	(12)
2019	Dinamo-Auto	18	(9)
2020	Narva Trans	29	(14)
2021	Lalitpur City	12	(14)
2021	Macchindra	15	(14)

International career
2010–2011	Azerbaijan U19	15	(10)
2013	Azerbaijan U21	12	(7)
- * Club domestic league appearances and goals

Nurlan Novruzov (born 3 March 1993) is an Azerbaijani professional footballer who plays as forward for Nepal Super League club Lalitpur City.

== Career ==
=== Club ===
On 25 July 2019, Novruzov signed contract with Moldovan National Division side FC Dinamo-Auto Tiraspol.

On 21 February 2020, Novruzov signed for Meistriliiga club JK Narva Trans after impressing on trial.

On 16 April 2021, Novruzov signed a contract with Nepal Super League franchise team Lalitpur City Football Club.

On 27 October 2021, Novruzov signed a season deal contract with Martyr's Memorial A-Division League club Machhindra F.C.

== Honours ==
=== Club ===
FC Baku

- Azerbaijan Cup: 2011–12

=== Individual ===
- Azerbaijan Premier League Top Scorer: 2014–15
