= Edgaras Žarskis =

Lithuanian footballer (born 1994)

Personal information
- Date of birth: 4 May 1994 (age 32)
- Place of birth: Vilnius, Lithuania
- Height: 1.88 m (6 ft 2 in)
- Position: Centre-back

Youth career
- 2009: Trakai
- 2009–2011: Žalgiris Vilnius

Senior career*
Years	Team	Apps	(Gls)
2009–2012	Žalgiris Vilnius	2	(0)
2012	→ Atlantas (loan)	12	(0)
2013–2015	Atlantas	56	(4)
2015–2016	Palanga	14	(1)
2016	Lietava Jonava	17	(0)
2017	Atlantas	5	(0)
2017	Sabail	10	(0)
2018	Bytovia Bytów	5	(0)
2018–2019	Gorodeya	21	(2)
2020	Tukums 2000	7	(1)
2020	Spartaks Jūrmala	12	(1)
2021	Puszcza Niepołomice	2	(0)
2021	Trans Narva	9	(0)
2022	Džiugas	22	(0)
2023	Maziya S&RC		

International career
2013–2015	Lithuania U21	3	(0)
- * Club domestic league appearances and goals as of 4 April 2023

Edgaras Žarskis (born 4 May 1994) is a Lithuanian former professional footballer who played as a centre-back.

== Club career ==
=== Puszcza Niepołomice ===
In first half of 2021, he played for Puszcza Niepołomice.

=== JK Narva ===
In July 2021, he signed with Estonian team JK Trans Narva. On 13 July, he made his debut in the Meistriliiga against Tammeka Tartu.
