= Eugeniu Cociuc =

Moldovan footballer

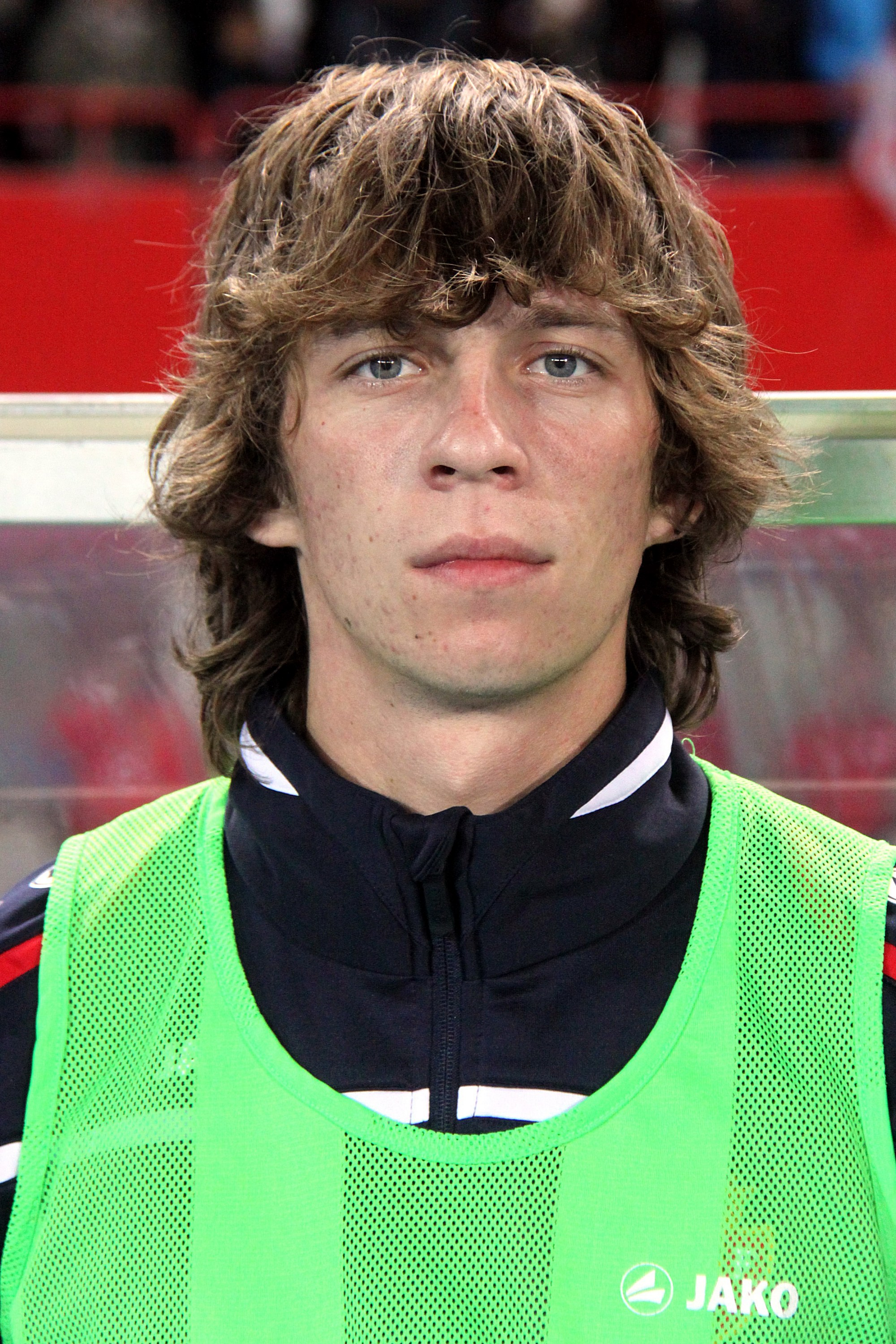
- Cociuc with Moldova in 2015

Personal information
- Date of birth: 11 May 1993 (age 33)
- Place of birth: Chișinău, Moldova
- Height: 1.80 m (5 ft 11 in)
- Position: Midfielder

Team information
- Current team: Zimbru Chișinău
- Number: 10

Youth career
- Dacia Buiucani 2

Senior career*
Years	Team	Apps	(Gls)
2012–2016	Dacia Chișinău	75	(6)
2016–2018	Žilina	17	(2)
2018	→ Sabail (loan)	13	(2)
2018–2019	Sabail	25	(5)
2020	Sabah	12	(0)
2021	Keşla	5	(0)
2021	Zimbru Chișinău	10	(1)
2022–2023	Pyunik	24	(0)
2024	Pyunik	7	(1)
2025–2026	Bălți	8	(1)
2026–	Zimbru Chișinău	0	(0)

International career^{‡}
	Moldova U19	5	(0)
	Moldova U21	3	(0)
2015–2022	Moldova	29	(0)
- * Club domestic league appearances and goals as of 16 June 2026 ‡ National team caps and goals as of 16 June 2026

Eugeniu Cociuc (born 11 May 1993) is a Moldovan professional footballer who plays as a midfielder for Moldovan Liga club Zimbru Chișinău.

== Career ==
=== Club ===
Cociuc returned to Žilina after six-months on loan at Sabail at the end of the 2017–18 season.

On 22 August 2018, Cociuc signed contract with Azerbaijan Premier League side Sabail. After leaving Sabail on 15 January 2020, Cociuc signed an 18-month contract with Sabah on 28 January 2020. Cociuc left Sabah by mutual consent on 29 December 2020 having played 12 games for the club. Cociuc then signed for Keşla on 9 February 2021.

On 24 January 2022, Cociuc signed for Pyunik. On 21 August 2023, Cociuc left Pyunik by mutual agreement. On 29 January 2024, Pyunik announced that Cociuc had re-joined the club having originally left in the summer.

== Honours ==
=== Pyunik ===
- Armenian Premier League: 2021–22, 2023–24

=== MŠK Žilina ===
- Fortuna Liga: Winners: 2016–17
