= Kamal Gurbanov =

Azerbaijani footballer

Personal information
- Full name: Kamal Fizuli oglu Gurbanov
- Date of birth: 6 May 1994 (age 32)
- Place of birth: Azerbaijan
- Height: 1.76 m (5 ft 9 in)
- Position: Right-back

Senior career*
Years	Team	Apps	(Gls)
2015–2017	Neftçi Baku	33	(0)
2017–2021	Sabail	32	(0)
- * Club domestic league appearances and goals as of 19 May 2021

Kamal Gurbanov (Azerbaijani: Kamal Qurbanov; born on 12 July 1995) is an Azerbaijani professional footballer who plays as a right-back.

== Club career ==
On 9 August 2015, Gurbanov made his debut in the Azerbaijan Premier League for Neftçi Baku against Kapaz.
