= Vüqar Nadirov =

Azerbaijani footballer (born 1987)

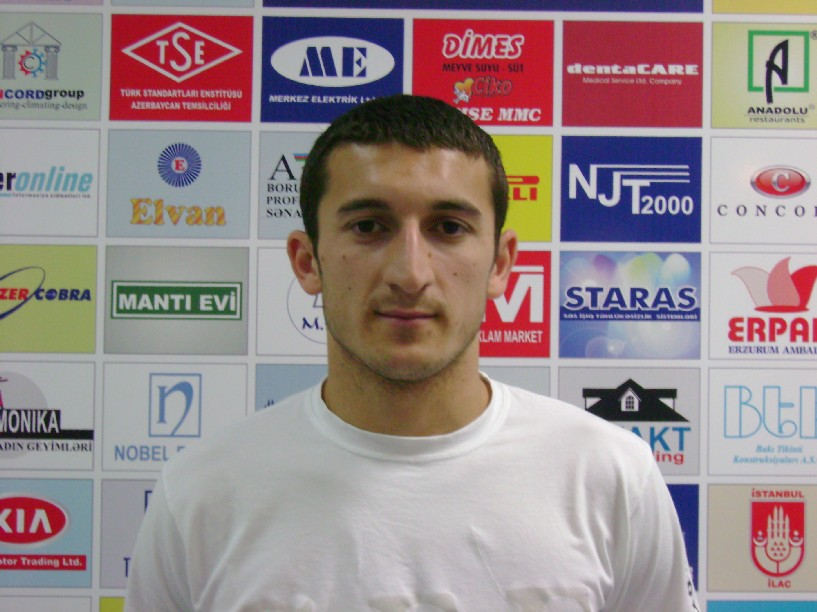

Personal information
- Full name: Vüqar Arshad oglu Nadirov
- Date of birth: 15 June 1987 (age 39)
- Place of birth: Seyidli, Ağdam, Soviet Union
- Height: 1.75 m (5 ft 9 in)
- Position: Striker

Senior career*
Years	Team	Apps	(Gls)
2001–2005	Qarabağ	42	(9)
2005–2008	Khazar Lankaran	48	(5)
2008	→ Masallı (loan)	11	(3)
2008–2009	Karvan	24	(6)
2009–2015	Qarabağ	167	(19)
2015	Khazar Lankaran	0	(0)
2015	Gabala	0	(0)
2016	Inter Baku	13	(1)
2016–2017	Qarabağ	2	(0)
2017–2018	Sabail	25	(3)

International career^{‡}
2002–2004	Azerbaijan U17	5	(2)
2004–2006	Azerbaijan U19	7	(1)
2006–2008	Azerbaijan U21	14	(2)
2004–2015	Azerbaijan	61	(4)
- * Club domestic league appearances and goals as of 26 May 2018 ‡ National team caps and goals as of 30 September 2015

Vüqar Arshad oglu Nadirov (Azerbaijani: Vüqar Ərşad oğlu Nadirov; born 15 June 1987 in Ağdam) is an Azerbaijani footballer, who last played for Sabail FK.

== Career ==
=== Club ===
Nadirov left FK Qarabağ in June 2015 after six years with the club, going on to rejoin FK Khazar Lankaran later in the month.

In December 2015, Nadirov left Gabala after six-months with the club, during which he failed to make a first team appearance.

On 27 May 2016, Nadirov left Inter Baku after six-months with the club.

On 14 July 2016, Nadirov signed a one-year contract with Qarabağ FK.

Nadirov was released by Sabail FK at the end of the 2017–18 season.

=== International career ===
Nadirov made his Azerbaijan debut on 12 February 2004, against Israel during friendly match, which made him young player ever to play for Azerbaijan until 2008.

== Career statistics ==
=== Club ===
As of match played 20 May 2018

Appearances and goals by club, season and competition
Club	Season	League			National Cup		League Cup		Continental		Other		Total	
Club	Season	Division	Apps	Goals	Apps	Goals	Apps	Goals	Apps	Goals	Apps	Goals	Apps	Goals
Qarabağ	2001–02	Azerbaijan Top League	2	2			–		–		–		2	2
Qarabağ	2003–04	Azerbaijan Top League	15	3			–		–		–		15	3
Qarabağ	2004–05	Azerbaijan Top League	25	4			–		1	0	–		26	4
Qarabağ	Total		42	9			-	-	1	0	-	-	43	9
Khazar Lankaran	2005–06	Azerbaijan Top League	17	3			–		–		–		22	2
Khazar Lankaran	2006–07	Azerbaijan Top League	22	2			–		–		–		22	2
Khazar Lankaran	2007–08	Azerbaijan Top League	9	0			–		0	0	–		9	0
Khazar Lankaran	Total		48	5			-	-	0	0	-	-	48	5
Masallı (loan)	2007–08	Azerbaijan Premier League	11	3			–		–		–		11	3
Karvan	2008–09	Azerbaijan Premier League	24	6			–		–		–		24	6
Qarabağ	2009–10	Azerbaijan Premier League	29	2			-		6	1	-		35	3
Qarabağ	2010–11	Azerbaijan Premier League	30	1	1	0	-		6	1	-		36	2
Qarabağ	2011–12	Azerbaijan Premier League	22	2	4	0	-		5	2	-		31	4
Qarabağ	2012–13	Azerbaijan Premier League	28	5	5	2	-		-		-		33	7
Qarabağ	2013–14	Azerbaijan Premier League	33	5	3	0	-		6	0	-		42	5
Qarabağ	2014–15	Azerbaijan Premier League	25	4	5	5	-		11	1	-		42	10
Qarabağ	Total		167	19	18	7	-	-	34	5	-	-	219	31
Khazar Lankaran	2015–16	Azerbaijan Premier League	0	0	0	0	–		–		–		0	0
Gabala	2015–16	Azerbaijan Premier League	0	0	0	0	–		0	0	–		0	0
Inter Baku	2015–16	Azerbaijan Premier League	13	1	4	1	–		0	0	–		17	2
Qarabağ	2016–17	Azerbaijan Premier League	2	0	1	1	–		1	0	–		4	1
Səbail	2017–18	Azerbaijan Premier League	25	3	2	0	–		–		–		27	3
Career total			332	46	25	9	-	-	36	5	-	-	393	60

=== International ===
Azerbaijan national team
Year	Apps	Goals
2004	1	0
2005	3	0
2006	5	0
2007	5	1
2008	1	0
2009	12	0
2010	6	0
2011	6	2
2012	7	1
2013	5	0
2014	3	0
2015	4	0
Total	58	4

Statistics accurate as of match played 3 September 2015

=== International goals ===
#	Date	Venue	Opponent	Score	Result	Competition
1.	6 June 2007	Almaty Central Stadium, Almaty, Kazakhstan	Kazakhstan	0–1	1–1	Euro 2008 qualification
2.	3 June 2011	Astana Arena, Astana, Kazakhstan	Kazakhstan	1–1	2–1	Euro 2012 qualification
3.	7 October 2011	Dalga Stadium, Baku, Azerbaijan	Austria	1–3	1–4	Euro 2012 qualification
4.	27 February 2012	The Sevens, Dubai, UAE	India	1–0	3–0	Friendly

== Personal life ==
His father died in the First Nagorno-Karabakh War.

== Honours ==
Khazar Lankaran

- Azerbaijan Premier League (1): 2006–07
- Azerbaijan Cup (1): 2006–07

Qarabağ

- Azerbaijan Premier League (3): 2013–14, 2014–15, 2016–17
- Azerbaijan Cup (1): 2014–15
