= Orkhan Gurbanli =

Azerbaijani footballer (born 1995)

Personal information
- Full name: Orkhan Nizami oglu Gurbanli
- Date of birth: 12 July 1995 (age 31)
- Place of birth: Baku, Azerbaijan
- Height: 1.84 m (6 ft 0 in)
- Position: Midfielder

Team information
- Current team: Dinamo-Auto Tiraspol
- Number: 24

Youth career
- Neftçi Baku

Senior career*
Years	Team	Apps	(Gls)
2014–2019	Neftçi Baku	2	(0)
2016	→ Daugavpils (loan)	8	(0)
2017–2019	→ Sabail (loan)	8	(0)
2019–2021	Sabail	4	(0)
2021–	Ventspils	0	(0)
2021–	→ Dinamo-Auto Tiraspol (loan)	13	(0)
- * Club domestic league appearances and goals as of 17 August 2021

Orkhan Gurbanli (Azerbaijani: Orxan Qurbanlı; born on 12 July 1995) is an Azerbaijani football midfielder who plays for Dinamo-Auto Tiraspol, on loan from Ventspils.

== Club career ==
On 17 May 2014, Gurbanli made his debut in the Azerbaijan Premier League for Neftçi Baku match against Simurq.

== Honours ==
Neftçi Baku

- Azerbaijan Cup (1): 2013–14
