= Ayrton Statie =

Dutch-Curaçaoan footballer (born 1994)

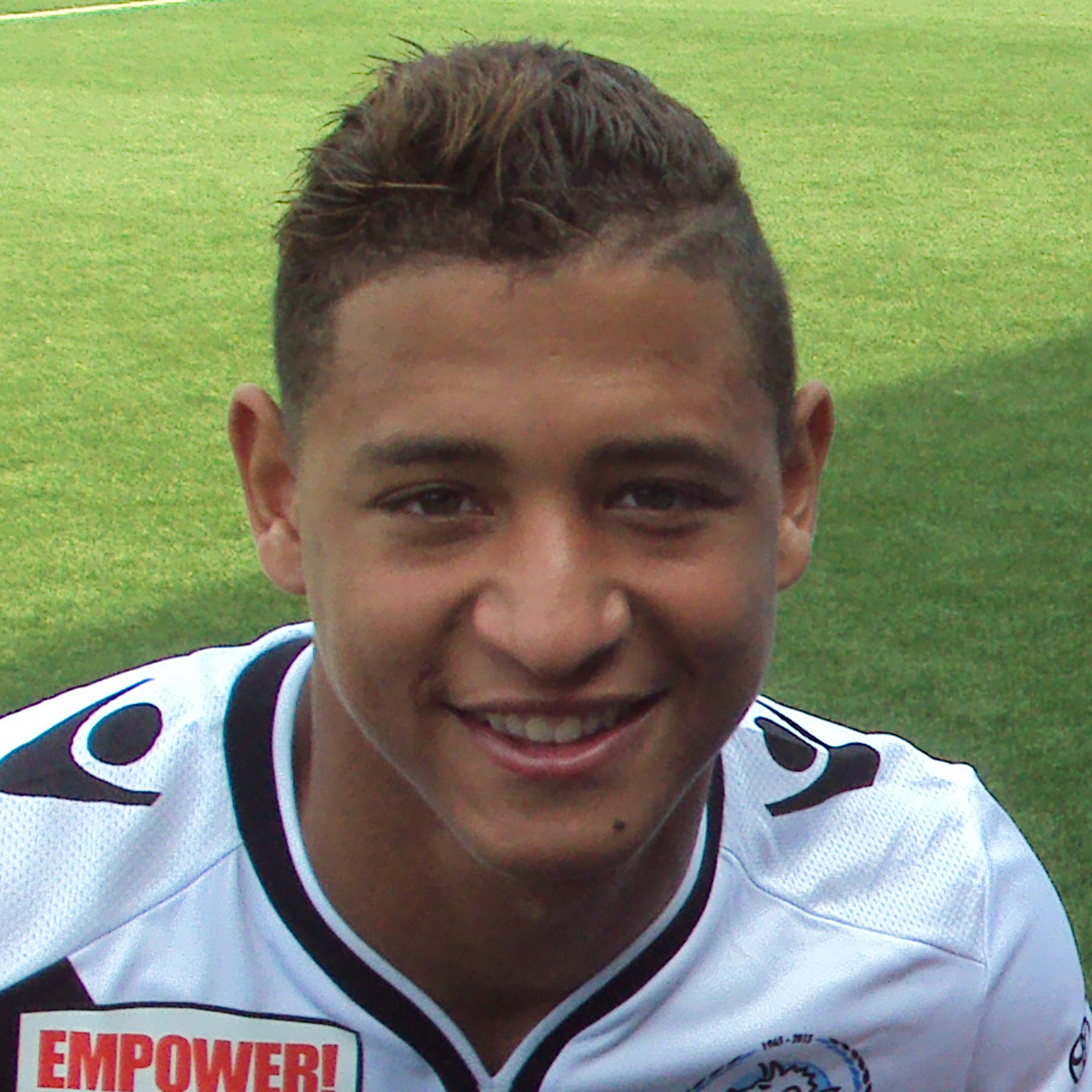

Personal information
- Full name: Ayrton Daryl Statie
- Date of birth: 22 July 1994 (age 32)
- Place of birth: Kralendijk, Bonaire, Netherlands Antilles
- Height: 1.76 m (5 ft 9 1/2 in)
- Position: Left back

Team information
- Current team: Achilles Veen
- Number: 17

Youth career
- VV Heeswijk
- Den Bosch

Senior career*
Years	Team	Apps	(Gls)
2013–2016	Den Bosch	54	(1)
2016	FC Eindhoven	1	(0)
2016–2017	FC Oss	19	(0)
2017–2018	Sabail	19	(1)
2019–2020	Lienden	10	(1)
2020	Reno 1868	1	(0)
2021–2022	Kozakken Boys	21	(0)
2022–2023	CHC Den Bosch		
2023–	Achilles Veen		

International career
2015–2022	Curaçao	17	(0)
- * Club domestic league appearances and goals as of 16 November 2024

Ayrton Daryl Statie (born 22 July 1994) is a professional footballer who plays as a left back for Achilles Veen. Born in Bonaire, he represents the Curaçao national team.

== Career ==
=== Club ===
Statie was released by Sabail FK at the end of the 2017–18 season.

=== International ===
Born in Bonaire, Statie received his first Curaçao national team call-up in May 2016. He debuted for Curaçao in a 7–0 2017 Caribbean Cup qualification win over U.S. Virgin Islands in June 2016.

== Career statistics ==
=== Club ===
As of match played 25 May 2018

Appearances and goals by club, season and competition
Club	Season	League			National Cup		League Cup		Continental		Other		Total	
Club	Season	Division	Apps	Goals	Apps	Goals	Apps	Goals	Apps	Goals	Apps	Goals	Apps	Goals
Den Bosch	2013–14	Eerste Divisie	5	0	0	0	–		–		–		5	0
Den Bosch	2014–15	Eerste Divisie	34	1	1	0	–		–		–		35	1
Den Bosch	2015–16	Eerste Divisie	15	0	1	0	–		–		–		16	0
Eindhoven	2015–16	Eerste Divisie	1	0	0	0	–		–		–		1	0
Oss	2016–17	Eerste Divisie	19	0	1	0	–		–		–		20	0
Səbail	2017–18	Azerbaijan Premier League	18	1	3	1	–		–		–		21	2
FC Lienden	2018-19	Tweede Divisie	10	1	1	0	–		–		1 (Note: Appearances in Tweede Divisie relegation playoffs)	0	12	1
Reno 1868	2020	USL Championship	1	0	0	0	–		–		–		1	0
Kozakken Boys	2021-2022	Tweede Divisie	21	0	2	0	–		–		1 (Note: Playoffs)	0	24	0
Career total			124	3	9	1	-	-	-	-	2	0	135	4

=== International ===
Curaçao national team
Year	Apps	Goals
2016	3	0
2017	3	0
2018	2	0
Total	8	0

Statistics accurate as of match played 26 March 2018

== Honours ==
=== International ===
Curaçao

- Caribbean Cup: 2017
- King's Cup: 2019
