= Murad Agayev =

Azerbaijani football player (born 1993)

Personal information
- Full name: Murad Aleksandr oglu Agayev
- Date of birth: 9 February 1993 (age 33)
- Place of birth: Stavropol, Russia
- Height: 1.85 m (6 ft 1 in)
- Position: Defensive midfielder

Senior career*
Years	Team	Apps	(Gls)
2012–2013	Sumgayit	30	(1)
2013–2014	AZAL	13	(0)
2014–2016	Sumgayit	51	(4)
2016–2017	Neftchi Baku	8	(0)
2017–2019	Sabail	10	(0)
2020	Keşla	0	(0)

International career
2012	Azerbaijan	1	(1)
2012	Azerbaijan U19	3	(1)
2013	Azerbaijan U21	0	(0)
2014	Azerbaijan	0	(0)
- * Club domestic league appearances and goals

Murad Agayev (born 9 February 1993) is an Azerbaijani former football player.

== Career ==
In June 2013, Agayev signed for AZAL from Sumgayit. After one season at AZAL he returned to Sumgayit.

On 17 June 2016, Agayev signed a two-year contract with Neftchi Baku Agayev was released by Sabail FK at the end of the 2017–18 season.

== Career statistics ==
=== Club ===
As of match played 29 August 2024

Club statistics
Season	Club	League	League		Cup		Other		Total	
Season	Club	League	App	Goals	App	Goals	App	Goals	App	Goals
Azerbaijan			League		Azerbaijan Cup		Europe		Total	
2011–12	Sumgayit	Azerbaijan Premier League	4	0	0	0	-		4	0
2012–13	Sumgayit	Azerbaijan Premier League	25	1	1	0	-		26	1
2013–14	AZAL	Azerbaijan Premier League	13	0	0	0	-		13	0
2014–15	Sumgayit	Azerbaijan Premier League	18	1	0	0	-		18	1
2015–16	Sumgayit	Azerbaijan Premier League	33	3	2	0	-		34	3
2016–17	Neftçi	Azerbaijan Premier League	8	0	3	0	4	0	15	0
2017–18	Sabail	Azerbaijan Premier League	10	0	2	0	-		12	0
2019–20	Shamakhi	Azerbaijan Premier League	0	0	0	0	-		0	0
Total			112	5	8	0	0	0	95	5

=== International ===
Azerbaijan
Year	Apps	Goals
2012	1	0
Total	1	0

Statistics accurate as of match played 24 February 2012
