= Amil Yunanov =

Azerbaijani footballer (born 1993)

Personal information
- Full name: Amil Azim oglu Yunanov
- Date of birth: 6 January 1993 (age 33)
- Place of birth: Tovuz, Azerbaijan
- Height: 1.80 m (5 ft 11 in)
- Position: Striker

Team information
- Current team: Bylis

Youth career
- 2002–2007: Turan Tovuz
- 2008–2009: Neftchi Baku
- 2009–2011: Gabala

Senior career*
Years	Team	Apps	(Gls)
2011–2014	Gabala	7	(1)
2013	→ Neftchala (loan)	9	(3)
2014–2015	Ravan Baku	17	(11)
2015–2018	Sumgayit	75	(28)
2018–2019	Keşla	24	(5)
2019–2020	Sumgayit	16	(0)
2020–2021	Sabail	17	(6)
2021–2022	Shamakhi	15	(2)
2022	Turan Tovuz	0	(0)
2022–2023	Shamakhi	22	(7)
2023–2024	Sabail	12	(0)
2024	→ Kapaz (loan)	10	(3)
2024–	Bylis	0	(0)

International career^{‡}
2011	Azerbaijan U19	3	(0)
2016–	Azerbaijan	4	(0)
- * Club domestic league appearances and goals as of 4 April 2024 ‡ National team caps and goals as of 3 July 2021

Amil Yunanov (born 6 January 1993) is an Azerbaijani professional footballer who plays as a striker for Kategoria Superiore club KF Bylis.

== Career ==
=== Club ===
On 14 June 2018, Yunanov signed a one-year contract with Keşla FK.

On 4 June 2019, Yunanov signed a one-year contract with Sumgayit FK.

On 5 January 2024, Yunanov joined Kapaz on loan from Sabail for the remainder of the 2023–24 season.

On 17 September 2024 Yunanov was transferred to the Albanian club Bylis.

=== International ===
On 26 May 2016 Yunanov made his senior international debut for Azerbaijan friendly match against Andorra.

== Career statistics ==
=== International ===
Azerbaijan
Year	Apps	Goals
2016	1	0
2017	0	0
2018	3	0
Total	4	0

Statistics accurate as of match played 29 May 2018
