= Alexandru Adrian Popovici =

Romanian footballer

Alexandru Popovici
Personal information
- Full name: Alexandru Adrian Popovici
- Date of birth: 6 September 1988 (age 38)
- Place of birth: Timișoara, Romania
- Height: 1.75 m (5 ft 9 in)
- Position: Winger

Team information
- Current team: Ghiroda
- Number: 9

Youth career
- CFR Timișoara

Senior career*
Years	Team	Apps	(Gls)
2005–2006	CFR Timișoara	9	(0)
2006–2012	Politehnica Timișoara	28	(9)
2006–2007	Politehnica II Timișoara	33	(2)
2007	→ FCM Reșița (loan)	15	(3)
2008	Politehnica II Timișoara	15	(1)
2008	→ CS Buftea (loan)	3	(1)
2009	→ Gloria Buzău (loan)	3	(0)
2012–2013	Concordia Chiajna	31	(1)
2013–2017	ACS Poli Timișoara	82	(11)
2017	Səbail	9	(1)
2018	ACS Poli Timișoara	12	(1)
2018–2021	Ripensia Timișoara	65	(6)
2021–2023	Slatina	40	(15)
2023	Șoimii Lipova	8	(1)
2023–	Ghiroda	26	(3)

International career
2005	Romania U-17	3	(0)
- * Club domestic league appearances and goals as of 12:44, 7 November 2024 (UTC)

Alexandru Adrian Popovici (born 6 September 1988) is a Romanian professional footballer who plays as a winger for CSC Ghiroda.

== Club career ==
=== Early career ===
Popovici began his youth career at Politehnica Timișoara. He was loaned three times to gain experience in Liga II to FCM Reșița where he played very well and was recalled to first team. However, he was loaned again at that time to the feeder club CS Buftea but in winter of 2009, he was loaned out again in Liga I to Gloria Buzău.

=== Politehnica Timișoara ===
Popovici made his debut in the Romanian Liga I in 2007, against the rivals from Dinamo București. On 13 November 2010, Popovici scored his first goal for Politehnica Timișoara in the away match against the champions Unirea Urziceni. He opened the score in the 55th minute with a solo run.

== Honours ==
Politehnica Timișoara

- Liga II: 2011–12

ACS Poli Timișoara

- Liga II: 2014–15

CSM Slatina

- Liga III: 2021–22
