= Famoussa Koné =

Malian footballer

Personal information
- Date of birth: 3 May 1994 (age 32)
- Place of birth: Bamako, Mali
- Height: 1.75 m (5 ft 9 in)
- Position: Striker

Youth career
- 2012–2014: Bastia

Senior career*
Years	Team	Apps	(Gls)
2012–2016	Bastia	4	(0)
2012–2016	→ Bastia B	55	(18)
2015–2016	→ Samsunspor (loan)	29	(11)
2016–2019	Göztepe	9	(0)
2017	→ Samsunspor (loan)	18	(6)
2017–2018	→ Gabala (loan)	23	(6)
2018–2019	→ Adanaspor (loan)	23	(8)
2019–2021	Ankara Keçiörengücü	49	(19)

International career
2013	Mali U20	5	(0)
- * Club domestic league appearances and goals

Famoussa Koné (born 3 May 1994) is a Malian former professional footballer.

== Career ==
=== Club ===
A former youth international for Mali, Koné was recruited by Bastia in 2012 as a youth asset, along with Abdoulaye Keita. He made his professional debut two years later, in a Ligue 1 defeat against Saint-Étienne in December 2014, coming in for Junior Tallo.

On 2 July 2017, Koné signed for Gabala FK on a one-year loan deal.

=== International ===
Koné represented the Mali U20s at the 2013 African U-20 Championship.

== Career statistics ==
=== Club ===
As of match played 28 May 2018

Appearances and goals by club, season and competition
Club	Season	League			National Cup		League Cup		Continental		Other		Total	
Club	Season	Division	Apps	Goals	Apps	Goals	Apps	Goals	Apps	Goals	Apps	Goals	Apps	Goals
Bastia	2012–13	Ligue 1	0	0	0	0	0	0	–		–		0	0
Bastia	2013–14	Ligue 1	0	0	0	0	0	0	–		–		0	0
Bastia	2014–15	Ligue 1	4	0	2	0	2	1	–		–		8	1
Bastia	2015–16	Ligue 1	0	0	0	0	0	0	–		–		0	0
Bastia	Total		4	0	2	0	2	0	-	-	-	-	8	1
Bastia II	2012–13	National 3	13	4	–		–		–		–		13	4
Bastia II	2013–14	National 3	24	10	–		–		–		–		24	10
Bastia II	2014–15	National 3	18	4	–		–		–		–		18	4
Bastia II	Total		55	18	-	-	-	-	-	-	-	-	55	18
Samsunspor (loan)	2015–16	TFF First League	29	11	0	0	–		–		–		0	0
Göztepe	2016–17	TFF First League	9	0	6	4	–		–		–		15	4
Göztepe	2017–18	Süper Lig	0	0	0	0	–		–		–		0	0
Göztepe	Total		9	0	6	4	-	-	-	-	-	-	15	4
Samsunspor (loan)	2016–17	TFF First League	18	6	0	0	–		–		–		18	6
Gabala (loan)	2017–18	Azerbaijan Premier League	23	6	6	1	–		4	0	–		33	7
Career total			138	41	14	5	2	1	4	0	-	-	158	47
