= 2014–15 Sumgayit FK season =

Sumgayit
2014-15 season
- President: Kamran Guliyev
- Manager: Ilham Yadullayev
- Stadium: Kapital Bank Arena
- Premier League: 8th
- Azerbaijan Cup: Second Round vs Baku
- Top goalscorer: League: Magomed Kurbanov (11); All: Magomed Kurbanov (11)
- Highest home attendance: 1,600 vs AZAL; 20 September 2014
- Lowest home attendance: 300 vs Baku; 3 December 2014
- Average home league attendance: 1,169; 10 August 2014
Third colours	Away colours

The Sumgayit 2014–15 season is Sumgayit's fourth Azerbaijan Premier League season. They will also participate in the Azerbaijan Cup and it is their first season with Ilham Yadullayev as their manager.

On 5 August 2014, Sumgayit changed the name of their stadium from Mehdi Huseynzade Stadium to Kapital Bank Arena for sponsorship reasons.

== Squad ==
As of match played 28 May 2015

No.	Name	Nationality	Position	Date of birth (age)	Signed from	Signed in	Contract ends	Apps.	Goals
Goalkeepers
1	Andrey Popovich	(Azerbaijan)	GK	19 March 1993 (aged 22)	Tavşanlı Linyitspor	2014		59	0
63	Shahrudin Mahammadaliyev	(Azerbaijan)	GK	12 June 1994 (aged 20)	Trainee	2012		22	0
Defenders
2	Slavik Alkhasov	(Azerbaijan)	DF	6 February 1993 (aged 22)	Khazar Lankaran	2014		97	3
3	Vurğun Hüseynov	(Azerbaijan)	DF	25 April 1988 (aged 27)	Gabala	2013		53	0
5	Jamal Hajiyev	(Azerbaijan)	DF	24 August 1994 (aged 20)	Inter Baku	2014		21	0
7	Ruslan Poladov	(Azerbaijan)	DF	30 November 1979 (aged 35)	Simurq	2014		28	0
15	Nodar Mammadov	(Azerbaijan)	DF	3 June 1988 (aged 26)	Ravan Baku	2013		54	0
23	Shahriyar Khalilov	(Azerbaijan)	DF	21 August 1991 (aged 23)	Khazar Lankaran	2014		12	0
92	Bakhtiyar Hasanalizade	(Azerbaijan)	DF	29 December 1992 (aged 22)	Trainee	2011		67	0
Midfielders
6	Mikayil Rahimov	(Azerbaijan)	MF	11 May 1987 (aged 28)	FC Baku	2015		2	0
8	Budag Nasirov	(Azerbaijan)	MF	15 July 1996 (aged 18)	Araz-Naxçıvan	2014		12	0
9	Orkhan Aliyev	(Azerbaijan)	MF	21 December 1995 (aged 19)	Trainee	2011		71	14
10	Tarzin Jahangirov	(Azerbaijan)	MF	17 January 1992 (aged 23)	loan from Gabala	2014		45	1
14	Magomed Kurbanov	(Azerbaijan)	MF	11 April 1992 (aged 23)	Taganrog	2014		45	18
18	Aleksandr Chertoganov	(Azerbaijan)	MF	8 February 1980 (aged 35)	Gabala	2013		63	1
22	Tofig Mikayilov	(Azerbaijan)	MF	1 April 1986 (aged 29)	Ravan Baku	2014		29	3
25	Farid Kerimzade	(Azerbaijan)	MF	5 April 1997 (aged 18)	Trainee	2013		2	0
45	Murad Agayev	(Azerbaijan)	MF	9 February 1993 (aged 22)	AZAL	2014		49	2
76	Uğur Pamuk	(Azerbaijan)	MF	1 May 1995 (aged 20)	loan from Khazar Lankaran	2015		53	5
97	Khayal Najafov	(Azerbaijan)	MF	19 December 1997 (aged 17)	Trainee	2014		1	0
Forwards
11	Şahin Äliyev	(Azerbaijan)	FW	19 March 1995 (aged 20)	Trainee	2014		3	0
17	Pardis Fardjad-Azad	(Azerbaijan)	FW	12 April 1988 (aged 27)	Sumgayit	2015		61	17
Out on loan
30	Tarlan Ahmadli	(Azerbaijan)	GK	21 November 1994 (aged 20)	Ravan Baku	2012		2	0
Left during the season
6	Tagim Novruzov	(Azerbaijan)	MF	21 November 1988 (aged 26)	Simurq	2014		4	0
8	Jeyhun Javadov	(Azerbaijan)	MF	5 October 1992 (aged 22)	Ravan Baku	2014		1	0
11	Kiyan Soltanpour	(Germany)	FW	23 July 1989 (aged 25)	Berliner AK	2014		12	3
17	Ramazan Abbasov	(Azerbaijan)	MF	22 September 1983 (aged 31)	Ravan Baku	2014		11	1
77	Tavakkyul Mamedov	(Russia)	MF	15 December 1992 (aged 22)	Torpedo Armavir	2014		15	0
86	Farid Guliyev	(Azerbaijan)	FW	6 January 1986 (aged 29)	Araz-Naxçıvan	2014		5	0

=== Out on loan ===
Note: Flags indicate national team as defined under FIFA eligibility rules; some limited exceptions apply. Players may hold more than one non-FIFA nationality.

No. / Pos. / Nation / Player; 94 / GK / AZE / Tarlan Ahmadli (at Zira)	No. / Pos. / Nation / Player

== Transfers ==
=== Summer ===
In: Note: Flags indicate national team as defined under FIFA eligibility rules; some limited exceptions apply. Players may hold more than one non-FIFA nationality.

No.	Pos.	Nation	Player
4	DF	AZE	Agil Nabiyev (from (Azerbaijan) Ravan Baku)
5	DF	AZE	Jamal Hajiyev (from (Azerbaijan) Inter Baku)
6	MF	AZE	Tagim Novruzov (from (Azerbaijan) Simurq)
7	DF	AZE	Ruslan Poladov (from (Azerbaijan) Simurq)
9	FW	AZE	Orkhan Aliyev (loan from (Azerbaijan) Khazar Lankaran)
10	MF	AZE	Tarzin Jahangirov (loan extended from (Azerbaijan) Gabala)
11	FW	GER	Kiyan Soltanpour (from (Germany) Berliner AK)
17	MF	AZE	Ramazan Abbasov (from (Azerbaijan) Ravan Baku)
22	MF	AZE	Tofig Mikayilov (from (Azerbaijan) Ravan Baku)
45	MF	AZE	Murad Agayev (from (Azerbaijan) AZAL)
77	MF	RUS	Tavakkyul Mamedov (from (Russia) Torpedo Armavir)
86	FW	AZE	Farid Guliyev (from (Azerbaijan) Araz-Naxçıvan)
96	MF	AZE	Budag Nasirov (from (Azerbaijan) Araz-Naxçıvan)

Out: Note: Flags indicate national team as defined under FIFA eligibility rules; some limited exceptions apply. Players may hold more than one non-FIFA nationality.

No.	Pos.	Nation	Player
4	DF	AZE	Samir Abbasov (Retired)
5	DF	AZE	Kamil Huseynov
7	FW	AZE	Pardis Fardjad-Azad
8	MF	AZE	Agshin Mukhtaroglu
10	MF	AZE	Uğur Pamuk (loan return to (Azerbaijan) Khazar Lankaran)
17	DF	RUS	Adil Ibragimov
19	MF	AZE	Magomed Mirzabekov (to (Azerbaijan) Inter Baku)
20	DF	AZE	Elşad Manafov
76	MF	AZE	Bayram Nuruzädä
77	FW	AZE	Ramil Mansurov
88	MF	AZE	Mirzaga Huseynpur (to (Azerbaijan) Inter Baku)
95	FW	AZE	Ruslan Nasirli (to (Azerbaijan) Araz-Naxçıvan)
99	FW	AZE	Rahman Hajiyev (loan return to (Azerbaijan) Baku)

=== Winter ===
In: Note: Flags indicate national team as defined under FIFA eligibility rules; some limited exceptions apply. Players may hold more than one non-FIFA nationality.

No.	Pos.	Nation	Player
6	MF	AZE	Mikayil Rahimov (from (Azerbaijan) Baku)
17	FW	AZE	Pardis Fardjad-Azad
76	MF	AZE	Ugur Pamuk (from (Azerbaijan) Khazar Lankaran)

Out: Note: Flags indicate national team as defined under FIFA eligibility rules; some limited exceptions apply. Players may hold more than one non-FIFA nationality.

No.	Pos.	Nation	Player
11	FW	GER	Kiyan Soltanpour (to (Germany) Viktoria 1889)
17	MF	AZE	Ramazan Abbasov (to (Azerbaijan) Baku)
30	GK	AZE	Tarlan Ahmadli (loan to (Azerbaijan) Zira)

== Friendlies ==
6 July 2014	Sumgayit	5 – 0	Neftchala
AZST (UTC+5)	Kurbanov; T.Mikayilov; B.Hasanalizade	Report

17 July 2014	Sumgayit (Azerbaijan)	2 – 3	(Iran) Persepolis	Turkey
AZST (UTC+5)	T.Mikayilov 19'; Kurbanov 85' (pen.)	Report	M. Abbaszadeh 49', 83'; M. Taremi 72'

20 July 2014	Sumgayit (Azerbaijan)	1 – 0	(Uzbekistan) Bunyodkor	Turkey
20:00 AZST (UTC+5)	Kurbanov 33' (pen.)	Report

23 July 2014	Sumgayit (Azerbaijan)	2 – 2	(Georgia (country)) Dinamo Batumi	Turkey
AZST (UTC+5)		[ Report]

25 July 2014	Sumgayit (Azerbaijan)	3 – 3	(Turkmenistan) Altyn Asyr FK	Turkey
AZST (UTC+5)		Report

27 July 2014	Sumgayit (Azerbaijan)	1 – 1	(Turkmenistan) Balkan FT	Turkey
AZST	Kurbanov	Report	Goal

14 January 2015	Sumgayit	5 – 1	Baku	Sumqayit
AZST	Kurbanov; B.Nasirov; T.Mikayilov; O.Aliyev		N.Gurbanov

18 January 2015	Sumgayit	0 – 0	AZAL	Sumqayit
AZT (UTC+4)		Report		Stadium: Kapital Bank Arena

== Competitions ==
=== Azerbaijan Premier League ===
==== Results summary ====
Overall								Home						Away					
Pld	W	D	L	GF	GA	GD	Pts	W	D	L	GF	GA	GD	W	D	L	GF	GA	GD
32	7	10	15	32	43	−11	31	5	5	6	15	13	+2	2	5	9	17	30	−13

Last updated: 28 May 2015.
Source: Soccerway

==== Results ====
10 August 2014 1	Sumgayit	3 – 0 Awarded	Qarabağ	Sumqayit
20:00 AZST (UTC+5)	T.Novruzov (yellow card) 77'; B.Hasanalizade (yellow card) 90+1'	Summary	Reynaldo 34', 85'; B.Hasanalizade 81' (o.g.)	Stadium: Kapital Bank Arena; Attendance: 1,380; Referee: Rauf Jabbarov

16 August 2014 2	Khazar Lankaran	0 – 1	Sumgayit	Lankaran
20:00 AZST (UTC+5)	Vanderson (yellow card) 30'; O.Sadigli (red card) 38'; Sadiqov (yellow card) 72'	Summary	O.Aliyev (yellow card) 17'; Kurbanov 38' (pen.); T.Novruzov (yellow card) 54'; Chertoganov (yellow card) 78'; T.Mamedov (yellow card) 81'; Mahammadaliyev (yellow card) 90+1'	Stadium: Lankaran City Stadium; Attendance: 8,500; Referee: Orkhan Mämmädov

24 August 2014 3	Inter Baku	5 – 1	Sumgayit	Baku
21:00 AZST (UTC+5)	Abatsiyev 8' (yellow card) 66'; Hajiyev 27'; D.Meza (yellow card) 44'; Álvaro 44', 90+2'; A.Mammadov 87'	Summary	T.Novruzov (yellow card) 30'; Kurbanov 40'; B.Hasanalizade (yellow card) 45'; Hüseynov (yellow card) 79'	Stadium: Inter Arena; Attendance: 500; Referee: Ramil Diniyev

30 August 2014 4	Sumgayit	Annulled^{2}	Araz-Naxçıvan	Sumqayit
20:00 AZST (UTC+5)	Hüseynov (yellow card) 11' (yellow-red card) 52'; Soltanpour 22'; T.Jahangirov (yellow card) 61'; Mahammadaliyev (yellow card) 90'	Summary	T.Khalilov (yellow card) 64'; D.Janalidze (yellow card) 75'; B.Soltanov (yellow card) 87'; K.Bayramov (yellow card) 90+3'	Stadium: Kapital Bank Arena; Attendance: 1,500; Referee: Omar Paşayev

14 September 2014 5	Baku	1 – 2	Sumgayit	Baku
17:00 AZST (UTC+5)	N.Novruzov 2' (yellow card) 43'; A.Guliyev (yellow card) 22'	Summary	B.Hasanalizade (yellow card) 36'; Kurbanov 56' (yellow card) 66'; Soltanpour 79'	Stadium: Tofik Bakhramov Stadium; Attendance: 300; Referee: Vusal Äliyev

20 September 2014 6	Sumgayit	0 – 1	AZAL	Sumqayit
17:00 AZST (UTC+5)	B.Hasanalizade (yellow card) 48'; Hüseynov (yellow card) 54'; S.Alkhasov (yellow card) 89'	Summary	Mombongo-Dues 24' (yellow card) 75'; S.Rahimov (yellow card) 51'; K.Diniyev (yellow card) 69'; Kļava (yellow card) 82'; N.Mammadov (yellow card) 85'	Stadium: Kapital Bank Arena; Attendance: 1,600; Referee: Omar Paşayev

28 September 2014 7	Simurq	3 – 2	Sumgayit	Zaqatala
18:00 AZST (UTC+5)	R.Eyyubov (yellow card) 22'; Agajanov (yellow card) 35'; S.Zargarov (yellow card) 43'; Banaś 61'; Qirtimov 74'; Stanojević 76'	Summary	Kurbanov 36' (pen.); Abbasov (yellow card) 45'; O.Aliyev (yellow card) 47' (goal) 58'	Stadium: Zaqatala City Stadium; Attendance: 2,000; Referee: Ramil Diniyev

17 October 2014 8	Sumgayit	0 – 1	Neftchi Baku	Sumqayit
16:00 AZST (UTC+5)	Chertoganov (yellow card) 67'; S.Alkhasov (yellow card) 90'	Summary	Nfor 12'; Allahverdiyev (yellow card) 26'; Yunuszade (yellow card) 43'; M.Isayev (yellow card) 76'; Seyidov (yellow card) 89'	Stadium: Kapital Bank Arena; Attendance: 1,300; Referee: Omar Paşayev

24 October 2014 9	Gabala	3 – 1	Sumgayit	Qabala
17:00 AZST (UTC+5)	Huseynov 77'; Farkaš 88'; Ehiosun 90+2'	Summary	Chertoganov (yellow card) 29'; Abbasov 40'; O.Aliyev (yellow card) 64'; Poladov (yellow card) 89'	Stadium: Gabala City Stadium; Attendance: 1,500; Referee: Vusal Äliyev

29 October 2014 10	Sumgayit	1 – 2	Khazar Lankaran	Sumqayit
16:00 AZT (UTC+4)	Kurbanov 43'; T.Novruzov (yellow card) 48'	Summary	Fernando Gabriel 26'; E.Abdullayev (yellow card) 58'; Sankoh 65'; Amirguliyev (yellow card) 79'	Stadium: Kapital Bank Arena; Attendance: 1,500; Referee: Rahim Häsänov

2 November 2014 11	Sumgayit	0 – 0	Inter Baku	Sumqayit
16:00 AZT (UTC+4)	Chertoganov (yellow card) 43'	Summary	J.Diniyev (yellow card) 61'	Stadium: Kapital Bank Arena; Attendance: 1,500; Referee: Orkhan Mämmädov

18 November 2014 12	Araz-Naxçıvan	Cancelled^{2}	Sumgayit	Nakhchivan
AZT (UTC+4)		[ Summary]		Stadium: Nakhchivan City Stadium

24 November 2014 13	Sumgayit	1 – 1	Baku	Sumqayit
17:00 AZT (UTC+4)	B.Hasanalizade (yellow card) 34'; Mammadov (yellow card) 44'; T.Jahangirov (yellow card) 84'; Soltanpour 85'	Summary	N.Novruzov 2'; Pelagias (yellow card) 32'; Horvat (yellow card) 44'; E.Huseynov (yellow card) 45'	Stadium: Kapital Bank Arena; Attendance: 500; Referee: Ramil Diniyev

29 November 2014 14	AZAL	3 – 2	Sumgayit	Baku
15:00 AZT (UTC+4)	Abdullayev 39'; V.Igbekoi (yellow card) 55' (goal) 63'; K.Diniyev (yellow card) 61'; N.Mammadov 73'	Summary	O.Aliyev 45'; T.Mikayilov 51'	Stadium: AZAL Arena; Attendance: 150; Referee: Fariz Yusifov

7 December 2014 15	Sumgayit	2 – 1	Simurq	Sumqayit
16:00 AZT (UTC+4)	T.Mikayilov 38'; Kurbanov 80'; Mammadov (yellow card) 90+1'	Summary	R.Eyyubov 5'; Osiako (yellow card) 13'; Qirtimov (yellow card) 21'; Gökdemir (yellow card) 64'	Stadium: Kapital Bank Arena; Attendance: 1,000; Referee: Ingilab Mämmädov

14 December 2014 16	Neftchi Baku	3 – 2	Sumgayit	Baku
17:00 AZT (UTC+4)	M.Isayev (yellow card) 23'; Qurbanov 51', 73'; Seyidov (yellow card) 54'; Abdullayev 56'	Summary	Mammadov (yellow card) 43'; O.Aliyev 34', 64'	Stadium: Bakcell Arena; Attendance: 2,000; Referee: Ramil Diniyev

18 December 2014 17	Sumgayit	1 – 1	Gabala	Sumqayit
15:00 AZT (UTC+4)	Chertoganov (yellow card) 33'; Kurbanov 67' (yellow card) 86'; T.Mikayilov (yellow card) 80'; T.Jahangirov (yellow card) 89'; O.Aliyev (yellow card) 90+1'	Summary	Ropotan (yellow card) 63'; Huseynov 86' (pen.)	Stadium: Kapital Bank Arena; Attendance: 1,500; Referee: Rahim Häsänov

21 December 2014 18	Qarabağ	2 – 0	Sumgayit	Baku
15:30 AZT (UTC+4)	George 26'; Hüseynov 56' (o.g.); J.Taghiyev (yellow card) 62'; Garayev (yellow card) 89'	Summary	Mammadov (yellow card) 59'; B.Nasirov (yellow card) 66'	Stadium: Tofiq Bahramov Stadium^{1} Attendance: 1,000; Referee: Ingilab Mämmädov

30 January 2015 19	Inter Baku	0 – 0	Sumgayit	Baku
16:00 AZT (UTC+4)	Bocognano (yellow card) 42'; Tskhadadze (yellow card) 60'	Summary	Fardjad-Azad (yellow card) 90+3'	Stadium: Inter Arena; Attendance: 400

6 February 2015 20	Sumgayit	Cancelled^{2}	Araz-Naxçıvan	Sumqayit
AZT (UTC+4)		[ Summary]		Stadium: Kapital Bank Arena

11 February 2015 21	Baku	0 – 0	Sumgayit	Baku
14:00 AZT (UTC+4)	G.Aliyev (yellow card) 57'	Summary	T.Jahangirov (yellow card) 66'	Stadium: Tofiq Bahramov Stadium; Attendance: 500; Referee: Aliyar Ağayev

15 February 2015 22	Sumgayit	0 – 0	AZAL	Sumqayit
16:00 AZT (UTC+4)	Chertoganov (yellow card) 15'; Kurbanov (yellow card) 74'; Fardjad-Azad (yellow card) 75'	Summary	N.Mammadov (yellow card) 45'; S.Asadov (yellow card) 50'; O.Lalayev (yellow card) 90+2'	Stadium: Kapital Bank Arena; Attendance: 500

19 February 2015 23	Simurq	1 – 1	Sumgayit	Zaqatala
17:00 AZT (UTC+4)	Ćeran 45+1'; Melli (yellow card) 46'	Summary	B.Hasanalizade (yellow card) 31'; Kurbanov 38'; T.Mikayilov (yellow card) 90+2'	Stadium: Zaqatala City Stadium; Attendance: 800; Referee: Orkhan Mämmädov

28 February 2015 24	Sumgayit	0 – 1	Neftchi Baku	Sumqayit
16:00 AZT (UTC+4)	Chertoganov (yellow card) 44'; O.Aliyev (yellow card) 45+1'	Summary	M.Isayev (yellow card) 11'; A.Guliyev (yellow card) 69'; Canales (yellow card) 75' (goal) 83'	Stadium: Kapital Bank Arena; Attendance: 1,200; Referee: Ramil Diniyev

8 March 2015 25	Gabala	2 – 0	Sumgayit	Qabala
18:00 AZT (UTC+4)	Mendy 23', 34'; U.Abbasov (yellow card) 45'; E.Jamalov (yellow card) 51'; Huseynov (yellow card) 51'; B.Soltanov (yellow card) 59'; Fomin (yellow card) 70'	Summary	B.Hasanalizade (yellow card) 14'	Stadium: Gabala City Stadium; Attendance: 300; Referee: Ingilab Mämmädov

18 March 2015 26	Sumgayit	1 – 2	Qarabağ	Sumqayit
16:00 AZT (UTC+4)	Agayev 50'	Summary	Reynaldo 52', 69' (yellow card) 70'; Guseynov (yellow card) 54'	Stadium: Kapital Bank Arena; Attendance: 1,500; Referee: Orkhan Mämmädov

1 April 2015 27	Khazar Lankaran	3 – 2	Sumgayit	Lankaran
17:00 AZST (UTC+5)	Ramaldanov 30'; Amirguliyev (yellow card) 45'; Poladov 63' (o.g.); E.Rzazadä (yellow card) 74'; Sankoh (yellow card) 82'; S.Tounkara (yellow card) 85'; Scarlatache 87'	Summary	S.Alkhasov 10'; Agayev (yellow card) 26'; Mammadov (yellow card) 39'; Chertoganov 69'; B.Hasanalizade (yellow card) 86'	Stadium: Lankaran City Stadium; Attendance: 1,000; Referee: Elvin Äsgärov

4 April 2015 28	Araz-Naxçıvan	– ^{2}	Sumgayit	Nakhchivan
AZST (UTC+5)		[ Summary]		Stadium: Nakhchivan City Stadium

9 April 2015 29	Sumgayit	0 – 0	Baku	Sumqayit
17:00 AZST (UTC+5)	J.Hajiyev (yellow card) 65'; T.Jahangirov (yellow card) 70'; B.Nasirov (yellow card) 90'	Summary	N.Novruzov (yellow card) 33'; G.Aliyev (yellow card) 63'; Pelagias (yellow card) 77'; E.Huseynov (yellow card) 84'	Stadium: Kapital Bank Arena; Attendance: 1,000; Referee: Ramil Diniyev

17 April 2015 30	AZAL	1 – 1	Sumgayit	Baku
16:00 AZST (UTC+5)	S.Asadov (yellow card) 44'; Juanfran (yellow card) 62'; Kutsenko (yellow card) 75'	Summary	J.Hajiyev (yellow card) 64'; Kurbanov 90+1'	Stadium: AZAL Arena; Attendance: 250; Referee: Orkhan Mämmädov

25 April 2015 31	Sumgayit	1 – 0	Simurq	Sumqayit
17:00 AZST (UTC+5)	Fardjad-Azad 49' (yellow card) 77'; Mahammadaliyev (yellow card) 89'	Summary	E.Abdullayev (yellow card) 31'; T.Akhundov (yellow card) 90+3'; R.Eyyubov (yellow card) 90+4'	Stadium: Kapital Bank Arena; Attendance: 1,100; Referee: Omar Paşayev

1 May 2015 32	Neftchi Baku	2 – 2	Sumgayit	Baku
20:00 AZST (UTC+5)	Canales 14' (red card) 45'; A.Quliyev (yellow card) 47'; S.Masimov 87'	Summary	S.Alkhasov 10'; Kurbanov 18' (yellow card) 90'; Chertoganov (yellow card) 32'; T.Mikayilov (yellow card) 79'	Stadium: Bakcell Arena; Attendance: 1,200; Referee: Orkhan Mämmädov

8 May 2015 33	Sumgayit	0 – 2	Gabala	Sumqayit
18:00 AZST (UTC+5)	J.Hajiyev (yellow card) 44'; B.Nasirov (yellow card) 85'; M.Rahimov (yellow card) 87'	Summary	E.Jamalov (yellow card) 11'; Abışov (yellow card) 31'; Gai 39'; Mendy 42' (yellow card) 53'; R.Tagizade (yellow card) 63' (yellow-red card) 83'	Stadium: Kapital Bank Arena; Attendance: 1,500; Referee: Aliyar Ağayev

15 May 2015 34	Qarabağ	1 – 0	Sumgayit	Baku
20:00 AZST (UTC+5)	George 33'; Agolli (yellow card) 90+2'	Summary	M.Rahimov (yellow card) 70'; S.Äliyev (yellow card) 90+2'	Stadium: Tofiq Bahramov Stadium^{1} Attendance: 4,000; Referee: Rahim Häsänov

22 May 2015 35	Sumgayit	2 – 0	Khazar Lankaran	Sumqayit
18:00 AZST (UTC+5)	Kurbanov 13'; T.Mikayilov 28'; S.Alkhasov (yellow card) 32'; Mammadov (yellow card) 43'	Summary	Scarlatache (yellow card) 27' (yellow-red card) 89'	Stadium: Kapital Bank Arena; Attendance: 1,000; Referee: Orkhan Mämmädov

28 May 2015 36	Sumgayit	3 – 1	Inter Baku	Sumqayit
19:00 AZST (UTC+5)	J.Hajiyev (yellow card) 15'; Fardjad-Azad 37'; B.Hasanalizade (yellow card) 43'; Kurbanov 45', 67'; Hüseynov (yellow card) 63'	Summary	I.Sadıqov 7'	Stadium: Kapital Bank Arena; Attendance: 1,500; Referee: Revan Hemzezade

==== League table ====
Pos	Team	Pld	W	D	L	GF	GA	GD	Pts	Qualification
1	Qarabağ (C)	32	20	8	4	51	28	+23	68	Qualification for Champions League second qualifying round
2	Inter Baku	32	17	12	3	55	20	+35	63	Qualification for Europa League first qualifying round
3	Gabala	32	15	9	8	46	35	+11	54	Qualification for Europa League first qualifying round
4	Neftchi Baku	32	13	10	9	38	33	+5	49	Qualification for Europa League first qualifying round
5	Simurq	32	11	6	15	41	39	+2	39	
6	AZAL	32	10	9	13	37	42	−5	39	
7	Khazar Lankaran	32	8	8	16	35	46	−11	32	
8	Sumgayit	32	7	10	15	32	43	−11	31	
9	Baku	32	3	8	21	19	68	−49	17	Relegation to the Azerbaijan First Division
10	Araz-Naxçıvan (Note: Araz-Naxçıvan were officially withdrawn from the league on 17 November 2014)	0	0	0	0	0	0	0	0	Team withdrawn

Source: uefa.com
Rules for classification: 1) points; 2) head-to-head points; 3) head-to-head goal difference; 4) head-to-head goals scored; 5. head-to-head away goals (only if 2 teams are tied); 6) goal difference; 7) goals scored.
(C) Champions

=== Azerbaijan Cup ===
3 December 2014 Second Round	Sumgayit	0 – 0 (a.e.t.) (3 – 4 p)	Baku	Sumqayit
14:00 AZT (UTC+4)	O.Aliyev (yellow card) 43'; Mammadov (yellow card) 61'; J.Hajiyev (yellow card) 65' (yellow-red card) 83'; B.Näsirov (yellow card) 68'	Summary	A.Guliyev (yellow card) 27'; V.Baybalayev (yellow card) 57'; N.Gurbanov (yellow card) 62'; Horvat (yellow card) 82'	Stadium: Kapital Bank Arena; Attendance: 300; Referee: Rahim Häsänov
	Penalties
	(penalty scored); O.Aliyev (penalty missed); B.Nasirov (penalty scored); T.Mikayilov (penalty scored); Poladov (penalty missed); Hüseynov (penalty missed)		Horvat (penalty scored); N.Gurbanov (penalty missed); M.Madatov (penalty scored); V.Baybalayev (penalty scored); Jabá (penalty missed); Pelagias (penalty scored)

== Squad statistics ==
As of Match played 28 May 2015

=== Appearances and goals ===
No.	Pos	Nat	Player	Total		Premier League		Azerbaijan Cup	
No.	Pos	Nat	Player	Apps	Goals	Apps	Goals	Apps	Goals
1	GK	(Azerbaijan) AZE	Andrey Popoviç	20	0	19	0	0+1	0
2	DF	(Azerbaijan) AZE	Slavik Alkhasov	32	2	28+3	2	1	0
3	DF	(Azerbaijan) AZE	Vurğun Hüseynov	31	0	29+1	0	0+1	0
5	DF	(Azerbaijan) AZE	Jamal Hajiyev	21	0	19+1	0	1	0
6	MF	(Azerbaijan) AZE	Mikayil Rahimov	2	0	2	0	0	0
7	DF	(Azerbaijan) AZE	Ruslan Poladov	28	0	27	0	0+1	0
8	MF	(Azerbaijan) AZE	Budag Nasirov	12	0	3+8	0	1	0
9	FW	(Azerbaijan) AZE	Orkhan Aliyev	26	4	17+8	4	1	0
10	MF	(Azerbaijan) AZE	Tarzin Jahangirov	27	0	20+7	0	0	0
11	FW	(Azerbaijan) AZE	Şahin Äliyev	3	0	0+3	0	0	0
14	MF	(Azerbaijan) AZE	Magomed Kurbanov	31	13	30+1	13	0	0
15	DF	(Azerbaijan) AZE	Nodar Mammadov	30	0	27+2	0	1	0
17	FW	(Azerbaijan) AZE	Pardis Fardjad-Azad	12	2	7+5	2	0	0
18	MF	(Azerbaijan) AZE	Aleksandr Chertoganov	31	1	28+2	1	1	0
22	MF	(Azerbaijan) AZE	Tofig Mikayilov	29	3	25+3	3	1	0
23	DF	(Azerbaijan) AZE	Shahriyar Khalilov	2	0	1+1	0	0	0
45	MF	(Azerbaijan) AZE	Murad Agayev	18	1	14+4	1	0	0
63	GK	(Azerbaijan) AZE	Shahrudin Mahammadaliyev	15	0	14	0	1	0
76	MF	(Azerbaijan) AZE	Ugur Pamuk	12	0	4+8	0	0	0
92	DF	(Azerbaijan) AZE	Bakhtiyar Hasanalizade	28	0	27	0	1	0
97	MF	(Azerbaijan) AZE	Xäyal Näcäfov	1	0	0+1	0	0	0
Players who appeared for Sumgayit no longer at the club:
6	MF	(Azerbaijan) AZE	Tagim Novruzov	4	0	4	0	0	0
8	MF	(Azerbaijan) AZE	Jeyhun Javadov	1	0	0+1	0	0	0
11	FW	(Germany) GER	Kiyan Soltanpour	12	3	3+8	3	1	0
17	DF	(Azerbaijan) AZE	Ramazan Abbasov	11	1	8+2	1	1	0
77	MF	(Russia) RUS	Tavakkyul Mamedov	15	0	9+6	0	0	0
86	FW	(Azerbaijan) AZE	Farid Guliyev	5	0	0+5	0	0	0

=== Goal scorers ===
Place	Position	Nation	Number	Name	Premier League	Azerbaijan Cup	Total
1	MF	(Azerbaijan)	14	Magomed Kurbanov	13	0	13
2	MF	(Azerbaijan)	9	Orkhan Aliyev	4	0	4
3	FW	(Germany)	11	Kiyan Soltanpour	3	0	3
3	MF	(Azerbaijan)	22	Tofig Mikayilov	3	0	3
5	DF	(Azerbaijan)	2	Slavik Alkhasov	2	0	2
5	FW	(Azerbaijan)	17	Pardis Fardjad-Azad	2	0	2
7	MF	(Azerbaijan)	17	Ramazan Abbasov	1	0	1
7	MF	(Azerbaijan)	45	Murad Agayev	1	0	1
7	MF	(Azerbaijan)	18	Aleksandr Chertoganov	1	0	1
				Awarded	3	0	3
				TOTALS	33	0	33

=== Disciplinary record ===
Number	Nation	Position	Name	Premier League		Azerbaijan Cup		Total	
Number	Nation	Position	Name	Yellow card	Red card	Yellow card	Red card	Yellow card	Red card
2	(Azerbaijan)	DF	Slavik Alkhasov	3	0	0	0	3	0
3	(Azerbaijan)	DF	Vurğun Hüseynov	3	0	0	0	3	0
5	(Azerbaijan)	DF	Jamal Hajiyev	4	0	2	1	6	1
6	(Azerbaijan)	MF	Mikayil Rahimov	2	0	0	0	2	0
7	(Azerbaijan)	DF	Ruslan Poladov	1	0	0	0	1	0
8	(Azerbaijan)	MF	Budag Nasirov	3	0	1	0	4	0
9	(Azerbaijan)	MF	Orkhan Aliyev	5	0	1	0	6	0
10	(Azerbaijan)	MF	Tarzin Jahangirov	4	0	0	0	4	0
11	(Azerbaijan)	FW	Şahin Äliyev	1	0	0	0	1	0
14	(Azerbaijan)	MF	Magomed Kurbanov	4	0	0	0	4	0
15	(Azerbaijan)	DF	Nodar Mammadov	6	0	1	0	7	0
17	(Azerbaijan)	FW	Pardis Fardjad-Azad	2	0	0	0	2	0
18	(Azerbaijan)	MF	Aleksandr Chertoganov	8	0	0	0	8	0
22	(Azerbaijan)	MF	Tofig Mikayilov	3	0	0	0	3	0
45	(Azerbaijan)	MF	Murad Agayev	1	0	0	0	1	0
63	(Azerbaijan)	GK	Shahrudin Mahammadaliyev	2	0	0	0	2	0
92	(Azerbaijan)	DF	Bakhtiyar Hasanalizade	8	0	0	0	8	0
Players who left Sumgayit during the season:
6	(Azerbaijan)	MF	Tagim Novruzov	4	0	0	0	4	0
17	(Azerbaijan)	DF	Ramazan Abbasov	2	0	0	0	2	0
77	(Russia)	MF	Tavakkyul Mamedov	1	0	0	0	1	0
			TOTALS	67	0	5	1	72	1

== Notes ==
- Qarabağ have played their home games at the Tofiq Bahramov Stadium since 1993 due to the ongoing situation in Quzanlı.
- Araz-Naxçıvan were excluded from the Azerbaijan Premier League on 17 November 2014, with all their results being annulled.
