= 2015–16 Sumgayit FK season =

Sumgayit
2015-16 season
- President: Kamran Guliyev
- Manager: Agil Mammadov (until 8 October 2015); Samir Abbasov (from 8 October 2015)
- Stadium: Kapital Bank Arena
- Premier League: 8th
- Azerbaijan Cup: Quarterfinal
- Top goalscorer: League: Amil Yunanov (12); All: Amil Yunanov (12)

The Sumgayit FK 2015-16 season is Sumgayit's fifth Azerbaijan Premier League season, and sixth season in their history. They will participate in the Azerbaijan Cup as well as the League.

== Season events ==
On 8 October 2015, Agil Mammadov resigned as manager, being replaced by reserve team manager Samir Abbasov. On 11 January 2016, Mammadov was re-hired as manager.

== Squad ==
As of match played 20 May 2016

No.	Name	Nationality	Position	Date of birth (age)	Signed from	Signed in	Contract ends	Apps.	Goals
Goalkeepers
1	Salahat Aghayev	(Azerbaijan)	GK	4 January 1991 (aged 25)	Inter Baku	2016		40	0
12	Tural Abbaszade	(Azerbaijan)	GK	16 October 1992 (aged 23)	Kapaz	2015		0	0
94	Tarlan Ahmadli	(Azerbaijan)	GK	21 November 1994 (aged 21)	Ravan Baku	2012		13	0
Defenders
2	Slavik Alkhasov	(Azerbaijan)	DF	6 February 1993 (aged 23)	Khazar Lankaran	2014		134	4
3	Vurğun Hüseynov	(Azerbaijan)	DF	25 April 1988 (aged 28)	Gabala	2013		87	0
4	Eltun Yagublu	(Azerbaijan)	DF	19 August 1991 (aged 24)	loan from Qarabağ	2016		0	0
5	Jamal Hajiyev	(Azerbaijan)	DF	24 August 1994 (aged 21)	Inter Baku	2014		46	0
14	Bakhtiyar Hasanalizade	(Azerbaijan)	DF	29 December 1992 (aged 23)	Trainee	2011		100	1
27	İsmayıl Babayev	(Azerbaijan)	DF	1 May 1999 (aged 17)	Trainee	2015		1	0
39	Emin Mehdiyev	(Azerbaijan)	DF	22 September 1992 (aged 23)	Neftchi Baku	2015		23	1
99	Rasim Ramaldanov	(Azerbaijan)	DF	22 September 1992 (aged 23)	Khazar Lankaran	2016		11	0
Midfielders
6	Mikayil Rahimov	(Azerbaijan)	MF	11 May 1987 (aged 29)	FC Baku	2015		10	2
8	Nijat Mukhtarov	(Azerbaijan)	MF	1 June 1995 (aged 20)	Ravan Baku	2016		15	0
10	Uğur Pamuk	(Azerbaijan)	MF	1 May 1995 (aged 21)	Khazar Lankaran	2015		80	8
13	Murad Agayev	(Azerbaijan)	MF	9 February 1993 (aged 23)	AZAL	2014		84	5
16	Kanan Manafov	(Azerbaijan)	MF	20 May 1995 (aged 21)	Ravan Baku	2016		0	0
18	Aleksandr Chertoganov	(Azerbaijan)	MF	8 February 1980 (aged 36)	Gabala	2013		89	1
22	Tofig Mikayilov	(Azerbaijan)	MF	1 April 1986 (aged 30)	Ravan Baku	2014		47	4
23	Tural Rzayev	(Azerbaijan)	MF	27 July 1995 (aged 20)	Qarabağ	2015		9	0
24	Amit Guluzade	(Azerbaijan)	MF	20 November 1992 (aged 23)	Atlético CP	2015		24	0
25	Ayaz Mehdiyev	(Azerbaijan)	MF	22 February 1993 (aged 23)	Giresunspor	2015		10	0
97	Khayal Najafov	(Azerbaijan)	MF	19 December 1997 (aged 18)	Trainee	2014		16	1
Forwards
7	Pardis Fardjad-Azad	(Azerbaijan)	FW	12 April 1988 (aged 28)	Sumgayit	2015		88	23
9	Ali Alimardanli	(Azerbaijan)	FW	24 October 1996 (aged 19)	Trainee	2016		4	0
29	Amil Yunanov	(Azerbaijan)	FW	6 January 1993 (aged 23)	Ravan Baku	2015		26	12
55	Aghabala Ramazanov	(Azerbaijan)	FW	20 January 1993 (aged 23)	Khazar Lankaran	2015		36	5
70	Vagif Javadov	(Azerbaijan)	FW	25 May 1989 (aged 26)	Khazar Lankaran	2015		17	3
Left during the season
1	Shahrudin Mahammadaliyev	(Azerbaijan)	GK	12 June 1994 (aged 21)	Trainee	2012		35	0
8	Nuran Gurbanov	(Azerbaijan)	MF	10 August 1993 (aged 22)	FC Baku	2015		11	1
9	Mirzaga Huseynpur	(Azerbaijan)	MF	11 March 1990 (aged 26)	Inter Baku	2015		45	4
15	Nodar Mammadov	(Azerbaijan)	DF	3 June 1988 (aged 27)	Ravan Baku	2013		64	0
16	Elnur Abdulov	(Azerbaijan)	FW	18 September 1992 (aged 23)	FC Baku	2015		2	0
Out on loan
14	Magomed Kurbanov	(Azerbaijan)	MF	11 April 1992 (aged 24)	Taganrog	2014		45	18

=== Out on loan ===
Note: Flags indicate national team as defined under FIFA eligibility rules; some limited exceptions apply. Players may hold more than one non-FIFA nationality.

No. / Pos. / Nation / Player; — / FW / AZE / Magomed Kurbanov (at Neftchi Baku)	No. / Pos. / Nation / Player

== Transfers ==
=== Summer ===
In: Note: Flags indicate national team as defined under FIFA eligibility rules; some limited exceptions apply. Players may hold more than one non-FIFA nationality.

No.	Pos.	Nation	Player
8	MF	AZE	Nuran Gurbanov (from (Azerbaijan) Baku)
9	MF	AZE	Mirzaga Huseynpur (from (Azerbaijan) Inter Baku)
12	GK	AZE	Tural Abbaszade (from (Azerbaijan) Ravan)
16	MF	AZE	Elnur Abdulov (from (Azerbaijan) Zira)
24	MF	AZE	Amit Guluzade (from (Portugal) Atlético CP)
23	FW	AZE	Tural Rzayev (from (Azerbaijan) Qarabağ)
25	MF	AZE	Ayaz Mehdiyev (from (Turkey) Giresunspor)
39	MF	AZE	Emin Mehdiyev (from (Azerbaijan) Neftchi Baku)
55	FW	AZE	Aghabala Ramazanov (from (Azerbaijan) Khazar Lankaran)
77	MF	AZE	Fuad Mammadzade (from (Azerbaijan) Qarabağ)

Out: Note: Flags indicate national team as defined under FIFA eligibility rules; some limited exceptions apply. Players may hold more than one non-FIFA nationality.

No.	Pos.	Nation	Player
1	GK	AZE	Andrey Popoviç (to (Azerbaijan) Gabala)
7	DF	AZE	Ruslan Poladov (to (Azerbaijan) Zira)
9	FW	AZE	Orkhan Aliyev (loan return to (Azerbaijan) Khazar Lankaran)
10	MF	AZE	Tarzin Jahangirov (loan return to (Azerbaijan) Gabala)
14	FW	AZE	Magomed Kurbanov (loan to (Azerbaijan) Neftchi Baku)
77	MF	RUS	Tavakkyul Mamedov

=== Winter ===
In: Note: Flags indicate national team as defined under FIFA eligibility rules; some limited exceptions apply. Players may hold more than one non-FIFA nationality.

No.	Pos.	Nation	Player
1	GK	AZE	Salahat Aghayev (to (Azerbaijan) Inter Baku)
4	DF	AZE	Eltun Yagublu (loan from (Azerbaijan) Qarabağ)
8	MF	AZE	Nijat Mukhtarov (from (Azerbaijan) Ravan Baku)
16	MF	AZE	Kanan Manafov (from (Azerbaijan) Ravan Baku)
23	MF	AZE	Ilgar Huseynov (from (Azerbaijan) Zira)
70	FW	AZE	Vagif Javadov (from (Azerbaijan) Khazar Lankaran)
99	DF	AZE	Rasim Ramaldanov (from (Azerbaijan) Khazar Lankaran)

Out: Note: Flags indicate national team as defined under FIFA eligibility rules; some limited exceptions apply. Players may hold more than one non-FIFA nationality.

No.	Pos.	Nation	Player
1	GK	AZE	Shahrudin Mahammadaliyev (to (Azerbaijan) Qarabağ)
8	MF	AZE	Nuran Gurbanov (to (Azerbaijan) Ravan Baku)
9	MF	AZE	Mirzaga Huseynpur (to (Azerbaijan) AZAL)
15	DF	AZE	Nodar Mammadov (to (Azerbaijan) Khazar Lankaran)
16	FW	AZE	Elnur Abdulov (to (Azerbaijan) Ravan Baku)
77	MF	AZE	Fuad Mammadzade

== Friendlies ==
Win Draw Loss Postponed

9 January 2016	Sumgayit	1 – 1	Sharurspor	Sumqayit
11:00 AZT (UTC+4)		Report	Javadov	Stadium: Kapital Bank Arena

9 January 2016	Sumgayit	4 – 1	AZAL	Sumqayit
16:00 AZT (UTC+4)	Yunanov; X.Nəcəfov; Ramazanov	Report		Stadium: Kapital Bank Arena

17 January 2016	Akzhayik (Kazakhstan)	0 – 1	(Azerbaijan) Sumgayit	Antalya, Turkey
19:00 AZT (UTC+4)		Summary	Fardjad-Azad 78'

20 January 2016	Voluntari (Romania)	0 – 0	(Azerbaijan) Sumgayit	Antalya, Turkey
19:00 AZT (UTC+4)		Report

21 January 2016	Sepahan (Iran)	2 – 1	(Azerbaijan) Sumgayit	Antalya, Turkey
19:00 AZT (UTC+4)	Khalatbari; Fazeli	Report	Fardjad-Azad 75' (pen.)

22 January 2016	Petrolul Ploiești (Romania)	1 – 1	(Azerbaijan) Sumgayit	Antalya, Turkey
19:00 AZT (UTC+4)	Varga 44'	Report	Fardjad-Azad 90'

== Competitions ==
=== Azerbaijan Premier League ===
==== Results summary ====
Overall								Home						Away					
Pld	W	D	L	GF	GA	GD	Pts	W	D	L	GF	GA	GD	W	D	L	GF	GA	GD
36	9	12	15	38	47	−9	39	5	8	4	21	20	+1	4	4	11	17	27	−10

Last updated: 20 May 2016.
Source: Soccerway

==== Results ====
10 August 2015 1	Ravan Baku	0 – 0	Sumgayit	Baku
21:00 AZST (UTC+5)	Barlay (yellow card) 16'; Y.Ağakärimzadä (yellow card) 79'; J.Kazimov (yellow card) 90+2'; R.Tagizade (yellow card) 90+4'	Report	Pamuk (yellow card) 37'; Ramazanov (red card) 40'; T.Mikayilov (yellow card) 86'; Mammadov (yellow card) 90+4'	Stadium: Bayil Stadium; Attendance: 1,000; Referee: Ingilab Mämmädov

16 August 2015 2	Sumgayit	1 – 1	Khazar Lankaran	Sumqayit
21:00 AZST (UTC+5)	Hasanalizade 10' (yellow card) 90+4'; Chertoganov (yellow card) 53'; J.Hajiyev (yellow card) 62'; E.Abdulov (yellow card) 83'	Report	E.Rzazadä 37'; Ramaldanov (yellow card) 64'; I.Säfärzadä (yellow card) 90+3'	Stadium: Kapital Bank Arena; Attendance: 1,580; Referee: Elvvin Äsgärov

23 August 2015 3	Neftchi Baku	2 – 1	Sumgayit	Baku
18:15 AZST (UTC+5)	A.Abdullayev 51'; R.Hajiyev 53'; Ailton (yellow card) 80'; Mammadov (yellow card) 88'	Summary	Fardjad-Azad (yellow card) 45'; N.Gurbanov 78'; J.Hajiyev (yellow card) 90+3'	Stadium: Ismat Gayibov Stadium; Attendance: 1,500; Referee: Ramil Diniyev

13 September 2015 4	Sumgayit	0 – 0	Zira	Sumqayit
19:00 AZST (UTC+5)	S.Alkhasov (yellow card) 66'; Chertoganov (red card) 74'; Guluzade (yellow card) 83'; Mahammadaliyev (yellow card) 90+1'	Report	V.Igbekoi (yellow card) 27'; A.Shemonayev (yellow card) 40'; Ivanović (yellow card) 55'; Mbah (yellow card) 60'; Meulens (yellow card) 86'	Stadium: Kapital Bank Arena; Attendance: 1,500; Referee: Orkhan Mämmädov

21 September 2015 5	Gabala	1 – 0	Sumgayit	Qabala
21:00 AZST (UTC+5)	E.Jamalov (yellow card) 69'; Abışov (yellow card) 80'; Sadiqov (yellow card) 82'; Gai 90+2' (pen.)	Report	J.Hajiyev (yellow card) 84'; T.Rzayev (yellow card) 90+1'	Stadium: Gabala City Stadium; Attendance: 2,000; Referee: Omar Paşayev

26 September 2015 6	Sumgayit	1 – 1	AZAL	Sumqayit
19:00 AZST (UTC+5)	Hasanalizade (yellow card) 29' (yellow-red card) 62'; A.Ramazanov 36'; Mammadov (yellow card) 62'; E.Mehdiyev (yellow card) 67'; S.Alkhasov (yellow card) 78'; M.Rahimov (yellow card) 83'; Guluzade (yellow card) 86'	Report	S.Asadov (yellow card) 35'; Guruli (yellow card) 78' (goal) 90+4'	Stadium: Kapital Bank Arena; Attendance: 1,000; Referee: Rahim Häsänov

4 October 2015 7	Kapaz	3 – 1	Sumgayit	Ganja
16:00 AZST (UTC+5)	Juninho 10', 81'; B.Nasirov (yellow card) 34'; R.Eyyubov 90+2'	Report	J.Hajiyev (yellow card) 31'; Pamuk 69'; S.Alkhasov (yellow card) 74' (yellow-red card) 76'; R.Ramazanov (yellow card) 88'	Stadium: Ganja City Stadium; Attendance: 12,000; Referee: Ramil Diniyev

18 October 2015 8	Sumgayit	1 – 1	Inter Baku	Sumqayit
20:00 AZST (UTC+5)	Fardjad-Azad 10'; E.Mehdiyev (yellow card) 27'	Report	N.Kvekveskiri 36'; Abatsiyev (yellow card) 41'; E.Abdullayev (yellow card) 88'	Stadium: Kapital Bank Arena; Attendance: 1,000; Referee: Omar Paşayev

25 October 2015 9	Sumgayit	1 – 0	Qarabağ	Sumgayit
19:00 AZT (UTC+4)	Fardjad-Azad (yellow card) 39'; M.Huseynpur 85'; Hasanalizade (yellow card) 90+3'	Report	Chumbinho (yellow card) 45+1'	Stadium: Kapital Bank Arena; Attendance: 1,380; Referee: Ravan Hämzäzadä

28 October 2015 10	Khazar Lankaran	1 – 2	Sumgayit	Lankaran
17:00 AZT (UTC+4)	E.Mirzəyev (yellow card) 21'; K.Abdullazadä (yellow card) 44'; S.Tounkara (yellow card) 79'; Scarlatache (yellow card) 87'; Amirguliyev 88'	Report	T.Mikayilov 7'; Ramazanov 37'; E.Mehdiyev (yellow card) 75'; N.Gurbanov (yellow card) 90+2'	Stadium: Lankaran City Stadium; Attendance: 1,200; Referee: Ramil Diniyev

2 November 2015 11	Sumgayit	1 – 2	Neftchi Baku	Sumqayit
19:00 AZT (UTC+4)	Pamuk 7'; J.Hajiyev (yellow card) 29'; Mahammadaliyev (yellow card) 76'; E.Mehdiyev (yellow card) 78'	Report	Añete (yellow card) 15'; Cauê (yellow card) 38'; Ailton (yellow card) 48'; Qurbanov (yellow card) 60' (goal) 77' (pen.); F.Muradbayli 72'; E.Abdullayev (yellow card) 85'; A.Mammadov (yellow card) 88'	Stadium: Kapital Bank Arena; Attendance: 2,000; Referee: Rauf Cabbarov

7 November 2015 12	Zira	3 – 2	Sumgayit	Baku
18:30 AZT (UTC+4)	J.Hajiyev 16' (o.g.); Bonilla (yellow card) 36'; A.Nagiyev 49'; V.Igbekoi (yellow card) 65'; N.Gurbanov (yellow card) 75'; T.Jahangirov (yellow card) 89'	Report	Hüseynov (yellow card) 9'; A.Ramazanov 45'; J.Hajiyev (yellow card) 70'; Fardjad-Azad 81'	Stadium: Zira Olympic Sport Complex Stadium; Attendance: 1,000; Referee: Äliyar Ağayev

21 November 2015 13	Sumgayit	2 – 2	Gabala	Sumqayit
17:00 AZT (UTC+4)	Pamuk 29'; Ramazanov (yellow card) 63' (goal) 69'; E.Mehdiyev (yellow card) 67'; Hasanalizade (yellow card) 77'; Hüseynov (yellow card) 87'	Report	Vernydub (yellow card) 31'; J.Hajiyev 40' (o.g.); Ricardinho (yellow card) 63'; S.Zargarov 71'; Antonov (yellow card) 78'	Stadium: Kapital Bank Arena; Attendance: 1,150; Referee: Elvin Äsgärov

28 November 2015 14	AZAL	2 – 0	Sumgayit	Baku
16:30 AZT (UTC+4)	M.Sattarly 20'; T.Novruzov (yellow card) 35'; R.Nasirli (yellow card) 37' (goal) 84'	Report	Fardjad-Azad (yellow card) 61'; T.Mikayilov (yellow card) 87'	Stadium: AZAL Arena; Attendance: 150; Referee: Aliyar Ağayev

7 December 2015 15	Sumgayit	2 – 2	Kapaz	Sumqayit
17:00 AZT (UTC+4)	Hüseynov (yellow card) 28'; Chertoganov (yellow card) 42'; T.Mikayilov (yellow card) 51'; E.Mehdiyev 56'; Yunanov 78'; M.Huseynpur (yellow card) 81'	Report	Guliyev (yellow card) 44'; T.Rzayev (yellow card) 57'; B.Soltanov (yellow card) 58'; Sytnik (yellow card) 71' (goal) 76'; T.Akhundov 90+5' (pen.)	Stadium: Kapital Bank Arena; Attendance: 1,500; Referee: Fariz Yusifov

11 December 2015 16	Inter Baku	2 – 3	Sumgayit	Baku
16:30 AZT (UTC+4)	Fomenko 44'; E.Abdullayev 52'; Hajiyev (yellow card) 90'; Khizanishvili (yellow card) 90+3'	Report	Yunanov 2', 39'; Chertoganov (yellow card) 17'; S.Alkhasov 32' (yellow card) 89'; Ramazanov (yellow card) 83'	Stadium: Inter Arena; Attendance: 500; Referee: Rävan Hämzäzadä

16 December 2015 17	Qarabağ	2 – 2	Sumgayit	Baku
16:30 AZT (UTC+4)	Richard 57' (pen.); Poepon (yellow card) 86' (yellow-red card) 90+1'; Quintana 89'	Report	Yunanov 7'; M.Rahimov (yellow card) 53' (goal) 54'; E.Mehdiyev (yellow card) 83'	Stadium: Tofiq Bahramov Stadium^{1} Attendance: 500; Referee: Omar Paşayev

19 December 2015 18	Sumgayit	3 – 3	Ravan Baku	Sumqayit
15:30 AZT (UTC+4)	Yunanov 12', 34'; E.Mehdiyev (yellow card) 62' (yellow-red card) 73'; M.Rahimov 90+3'	Report	Suma 27'; R.Tagizade 35'; Abbasov 75' (pen.) (yellow card) 76'; Y.Ağakärimzadä (yellow card) 77'; N.Mammadov (yellow card) 83'; Makhnovskyi (yellow card) 88'	Stadium: Kapital Bank Arena; Attendance: 500; Referee: Orhan Mämmädov

30 January 2016 19	Neftchi Baku	1 – 0	Sumgayit	Baku
16:30 AZT (UTC+4)	Añete (yellow card) 13'; Qurbanov 55'; Hajiyev (yellow card) 57'; K.Gurbanov (yellow card) 70'	Report	Hüseynov (yellow card) 61'; J.Hajiyev (yellow card) 66'; Ramazanov (yellow card) 79'; Agayev (yellow card) 82'; Chertoganov (yellow card) 84'	Stadium: Bakcell Arena; Attendance: 1,000; Referee: Aliyar Ağayev

6 February 2016 20	Sumgayit	0 – 2	Zira	Sumqayit
15:00 AZT (UTC+4)	Guluzade (yellow card) 17'; E.Mehdiyev (yellow card) 29' (yellow-red card) 61'	Report	Bonilla 4'; Tato (yellow card) 40'; A.Nagiyev (yellow card) 55'; Abdullayev 90+2'	Stadium: Kapital Bank Arena; Attendance: 2,000; Referee: Omar Paşayev

14 February 2016 21	Gabala	1 – 0	Sumgayit	Qabala
17:30 AZT (UTC+4)	E.Jamalov (yellow card) 26'; Zec 69'	Report	Agayev (yellow card) 68'; Guluzade (yellow card) 84'; J.Hajiyev (yellow card) 88'	Stadium: Gabala City Stadium; Attendance: 850; Referee: Ravan Hämzäzadä

20 February 2016 22	Sumgayit	2 – 0	AZAL	Sumqayit
15:00 AZT (UTC+4)	Agayev 32'; Ramazanov 39' (yellow card) 49'	Report	Kvirtia (yellow card) 47'; T.Hümbätov (yellow card) 49'	Stadium: Kapital Bank Arena; Attendance: 1,500; Referee: Əliyar Ağayev

27 February 2016 23	Kapaz	0 – 0	Sumgayit	Ganja
14:00 AZT (UTC+4)	T.Akhundov (yellow card) 26'; Ebah (yellow card) 62'	Report	Chertoganov (yellow card) 37'; Ramaldanov (yellow card) 62'; Guluzade (yellow card) 66'; Ramazanov (yellow card) 75'	Stadium: Ganja City Stadium; Attendance: 13,500; Referee: Aliyar Ağayev

5 March 2016 24	Sumgayit	0 – 1	Inter Baku	Sumqayit
17:00 AZT (UTC+4)	J.Hajiyev (yellow card) 32'; Guluzade (yellow card) 39'; Chertoganov (yellow card) 78'	Report	Hajiyev 48'; E.Abdullayev (yellow card) 67'; Qirtimov (yellow card) 87'	Stadium: Kapital Bank Arena; Attendance: 1,400; Referee: Rauf Cabbarov

13 March 2016 25	Sumgayit	0 – 2	Qarabağ	Sumgayit
17:30 AZT (UTC+4)	Hüseynov (yellow card) 61'; K.Najafov (yellow card) 63'; Chertoganov (yellow card) 77'; S.Alkhasov (yellow card) 90+1'	Report	Quintana 13'; Míchel 17'; Garayev (yellow card) 80'; Muarem (yellow card) 85'	Stadium: Kapital Bank Arena; Attendance: 1,300; Referee: Ingilab Məmmədov

18 March 2016 26	Ravan Baku	1 – 2	Sumgayit	Baku
21:00 AZT (UTC+4)	R.Tagizade 90' (pen.)	Report	Yunisoğlu 8' (o.g.); Yunanov 33'; Ramaldanov (yellow card) 36'; Agayev (yellow card) 45+2'; J.Hajiyev (yellow card) 89'	Stadium: Bayil Stadium; Attendance: 150; Referee: Ravan Həmzəzadə

30 March 2016 27	Sumgayit	2 – 1	Khazar Lankaran	Sumgayit
17:00 AZT (UTC+4)	Yunanov (yellow card) 33'; E.Mehdiyev (yellow card) 48'; Mammadov 50' (o.g.); Javadov (yellow card) 56'; M.Rahimov (red card) 70'; Agayev 90'	Report	A.Mirili (yellow card) 26'; Z.Mirzazade 49' (pen.); O.Sadigli (yellow card) 68'	Stadium: Kapital Bank Arena; Attendance: 1,200; Referee: Elvin Əsgərov

3 April 2016 28	Zira	1 – 0	Sumgayit	Baku
16:00 AZT (UTC+4)	A.Shemonayev (yellow card) 52'; N.Novruzov 84'	Report	Hüseynov (yellow card) 82'	Stadium: Zira Olympic Sport Complex Stadium; Attendance: 1,300; Referee: Aliyar Ağayev

9 April 2016 29	Sumgayit	1 – 1	Gabala	Sumqayit
15:00 AZT (UTC+4)	Guluzade (yellow card) 9'; Fardjad-Azad 85' (pen.)	Report	Gai (yellow card) 33' (goal) 65'; Stanković (yellow card) 62'	Stadium: Kapital Bank Arena; Attendance: 1,300; Referee: Omar Paşayev

16 April 2016 30	AZAL	1 – 0	Sumgayit	Baku
19:00 AZT (UTC+4)	T.Hümbätov (yellow card) 12' (goal) 39'; K.Huseynov (yellow card) 53'; Jafarguliyev (yellow card) 65'; Guruli (yellow card) 81'	Report	Javadov (yellow card) 61'; J.Hajiyev (yellow card) 62'; Chertoganov (yellow card) 84'; Aghayev (yellow card) 90+3'	Stadium: AZAL Arena; Attendance: 250; Referee: Fariz Yusifov

24 April 2016 31	Sumgayit	2 – 3	Kapaz	Sumqayit
14:00 AZT (UTC+4)	Agayev 22'; Fardjad-Azad (yellow card) 32'; Yunanov 73'	Report	S.Rahimov (yellow card) 27'; K.Diniyev (yellow card) 29'; Fardjad-Azad 45+1'; Juninho 59'; Ebah 60'; T.Akhundov (yellow card) 76'	Stadium: Kapital Bank Arena; Attendance: 1,400; Referee: Rauf Jabbarov

1 May 2016 32	Inter Baku	2 – 2	Sumgayit	Baku
16:00 AZT (UTC+4)	M.Abbasov 11'; Aghayev (red card) 27'; Aliyev (yellow card) 41'; Kvekveskiri 90+4'	Report	Javadov 6'; Yunanov 19'; J.Hajiyev (red card) 90+1'	Stadium: Inter Arena; Attendance: 400; Referee: Omar Paşayev

7 May 2016 33	Qarabağ	1 – 0	Sumgayit	Baku
19:00 AZT (UTC+4)	Ismayilov 41'; Guseynov (yellow card) 62'	Report		Stadium: Inter Arena; Attendance: 500; Referee: Rovan Rəcəbov

11 May 2016 34	Sumgayit	3 – 1	Ravan Baku	Sumqayit
18:00 AZT (UTC+4)	Yunanov 64'; Fardjad-Azad 71', 81'	Report	Khamid 8'; E.Abdulov (yellow card) 69'	Stadium: Kapital Bank Arena; Attendance: 800; Referee: Ravan Həmzəzadə

15 May 2016 35	Khazar Lankaran	1 – 2	Sumgayit	Lankaran
18:00 AZT (UTC+4)	T.Gurbatov 34' (pen.); O.Safiyaroglu (yellow card) 55'	Report	Hasanalizade (yellow card) 34'; Javadov 65' (yellow card) 81'; Yunanov 80'; Ramaldanov (yellow card) 90+4'	Stadium: Lankaran City Stadium; Attendance: 200; Referee: Ingilab Məmmədov

20 May 2016 36	Sumgayit	2 – 1	Neftchi Baku	Sumqayit
19:00 AZT (UTC+4)	Javadov 18'; Ramaldanov (yellow card) 56'; Yunanov 64'; Ramazanov (yellow card) 71'; N.Mukhtarov (yellow card) 72'; Agayev (yellow card) 76'; Aghayev (yellow card) 82'	Report	Añete (yellow card) 9'; A.Abdullayev 14'; R.Mammadov (yellow card) 43'; Jairo (yellow card) 62'	Stadium: Kapital Bank Arena; Attendance: 1,350; Referee: Rauf Jabbarov

==== League table ====
Pos	Team	Pld	W	D	L	GF	GA	GD	Pts	Qualification or relegation
6	Neftçi Baku	36	13	10	13	41	41	0	49	Qualification for the Europa League first qualifying round
7	AZAL	36	13	7	16	26	38	−12	46	
8	Sumgayit	36	9	12	15	41	49	−8	39	
9	Ravan Baku	36	5	9	22	27	63	−36	18	
10	Khazar Lankaran (R)	36	3	6	27	16	51	−35	15	Relegation to the Azerbaijan First Division

Source: PFL, UEFA, Soccerway
Rules for classification: 1) Points; 2) Head-to-head points; 3) Head-to-head goal difference; 4) Head-to-head goals scored; 5) Head-to-head away goals scored (only if two teams); 6) Goal difference; 7) Goals scored.
(R) Relegated

=== Azerbaijan Cup ===
2 December 2015 Second Round	Neftchala	0 – 1	Sumgayit	Neftçala
14:00 AZT (UTC+4)	D.Janelidze (yellow card) 74'; F.Äliyev (yellow card) 77'	Summary	Mammadov (yellow card) 25'; M.Rahimov (yellow card) 58'; Chertoganov (yellow card) 60'; Fardjad-Azad 90'	Stadium: Nariman Narimanov Stadium; Attendance: 400; Referee: Ramil Diniyev

2 March 2016 Quarterfinal 1st leg	Qarabağ	2 – 0	Sumgayit	Baku
17:00 AZT (UTC+4)	Garayev (yellow card) 45'; Richard 52' (pen.); M.Madatov 86'	Summary	E.Mehdiyev (yellow card) 12'	Stadium: Tofiq Bahramov Stadium^{1} Attendance: 700; Referee: Orkhan Mammadov

9 March 2016 Quarterfinal 2nd leg	Sumgayit	1 – 4 (1 – 6 agg.)	Qarabağ	Sumqayit
15:00 AZT (UTC+4)	K.Najafov 63'; Hasanalizade (yellow card) 84'	Summary	Muarem 6', 50'; Armenteros 10', 58'; Quintana (yellow card) 65'	Stadium: Kapital Bank Arena; Attendance: 1,000; Referee: Omar Paşayev

== Squad statistics ==
As of Match played 20 May 2016

=== Appearances and goals ===
No.	Pos	Nat	Player	Total		Premier League		Azerbaijan Cup	
No.	Pos	Nat	Player	Apps	Goals	Apps	Goals	Apps	Goals
1	GK	(Azerbaijan) AZE	Salahat Aghayev	17	0	16	0	1	0
2	DF	(Azerbaijan) AZE	Slavik Alkhasov	37	1	33+1	1	3	0
3	DF	(Azerbaijan) AZE	Vurğun Hüseynov	34	0	33	0	1	0
5	DF	(Azerbaijan) AZE	Jamil Hajiyev	25	0	21+3	0	1	0
6	MF	(Azerbaijan) AZE	Mikayil Rahimov	8	2	6+1	2	1	0
7	FW	(Azerbaijan) AZE	Pardis Fardjad-Azad	27	6	16+9	5	1+1	1
8	MF	(Azerbaijan) AZE	Nijat Mukhtarov	15	0	9+5	0	0+1	0
9	FW	(Azerbaijan) AZE	Ali Alimardanli	4	0	0+3	0	0+1	0
10	MF	(Azerbaijan) AZE	Uğur Pamuk	27	3	19+6	3	1+1	0
13	MF	(Azerbaijan) AZE	Murad Agayev	35	3	33	3	2	0
14	DF	(Azerbaijan) AZE	Bakhtiyar Hasanalizade	33	1	29+1	1	3	0
18	MF	(Azerbaijan) AZE	Aleksandr Chertoganov	26	0	20+3	0	2+1	0
22	MF	(Azerbaijan) AZE	Tofig Mikayilov	18	1	11+6	1	0+1	0
23	MF	(Azerbaijan) AZE	Tural Rzayev	9	0	5+4	0	0	0
24	MF	(Azerbaijan) AZE	Amit Guluzade	24	0	16+6	0	2	0
25	MF	(Azerbaijan) AZE	Ayaz Mehdiyev	10	0	6+3	0	1	0
27	DF	(Azerbaijan) AZE	İsmayıl Babayev	1	0	1	0	0	0
29	FW	(Azerbaijan) AZE	Amil Yunanov	26	12	13+11	12	2	0
39	DF	(Azerbaijan) AZE	Emin Mehdiyev	23	1	17+3	1	3	0
55	FW	(Azerbaijan) AZE	Aghabala Ramazanov	36	5	31+2	5	3	0
70	FW	(Azerbaijan) AZE	Vagif Javadov	17	3	15+1	3	0+1	0
94	GK	(Azerbaijan) AZE	Tarlan Ahmadli	11	0	7+2	0	2	0
97	MF	(Azerbaijan) AZE	Khayal Najafov	15	1	5+9	0	1	1
99	DF	(Azerbaijan) AZE	Rasim Ramaldanov	11	0	7+2	0	2	0
Players who appeared for Sumgayit but left during the season:
1	GK	(Azerbaijan) AZE	Shahrudin Mahammadaliyev	13	0	13	0	0	0
8	MF	(Azerbaijan) AZE	Nuran Gurbanov	11	1	4+6	1	0+1	0
9	MF	(Azerbaijan) AZE	Mirzaga Huseynpur	8	1	1+7	1	0	0
15	DF	(Azerbaijan) AZE	Nodar Mammadov	10	0	7+2	0	1	0
16	FW	(Azerbaijan) AZE	Elnur Abdulov	2	0	1+1	0	0	0

=== Goal scorers ===
Place	Position	Nation	Number	Name	Premier League	Azerbaijan Cup	Total
1	FW	(Azerbaijan)	29	Amil Yunanov	12	0	12
2	FW	(Azerbaijan)	7	Pardis Fardjad-Azad	5	1	6
3	FW	(Azerbaijan)	55	Aghabala Ramazanov	5	0	5
4	MF	(Azerbaijan)	10	Uğur Pamuk	3	0	3
4	MF	(Azerbaijan)	13	Murad Agayev	3	0	3
4	FW	(Azerbaijan)	70	Vagif Javadov	3	0	3
7	MF	(Azerbaijan)	6	Mikayil Rahimov	2	0	2
7				Own goal	2	0	2
9	DF	(Azerbaijan)	14	Bakhtiyar Hasanalizade	1	0	1
9	MF	(Azerbaijan)	8	Nuran Gurbanov	1	0	1
9	MF	(Azerbaijan)	9	Mirzaga Huseynpur	1	0	1
9	MF	(Azerbaijan)	22	Tofig Mikayilov	1	0	1
9	DF	(Azerbaijan)	39	Emin Mehdiyev	1	0	1
9	DF	(Azerbaijan)	2	Slavik Alkhasov	1	0	1
9	MF	(Azerbaijan)	97	Khayal Najafov	1	0	1
				TOTALS	41	2	43

=== Disciplinary record ===
Number	Nation	Position	Name	Premier League		Azerbaijan Cup		Total	
Number	Nation	Position	Name	Yellow card	Red card	Yellow card	Red card	Yellow card	Red card
1	(Azerbaijan)	GK	Salahat Aghayev	1	0	0	0	1	0
2	(Azerbaijan)	DF	Slavik Alkhasov	6	1	0	0	6	1
3	(Azerbaijan)	DF	Vurğun Hüseynov	6	0	0	0	6	0
5	(Azerbaijan)	DF	Jamil Hajiyev	11	1	0	0	11	1
6	(Azerbaijan)	MF	Mikayil Rahimov	2	1	1	0	3	1
7	(Azerbaijan)	FW	Pardis Fardjad-Azad	4	0	0	0	4	0
10	(Azerbaijan)	MF	Uğur Pamuk	1	0	0	0	1	0
13	(Azerbaijan)	MF	Murad Agayev	4	0	0	0	4	0
14	(Azerbaijan)	DF	Bakhtiyar Hasanalizade	7	1	1	0	8	1
18	(Azerbaijan)	MF	Aleksandr Chertoganov	8	1	1	0	9	1
22	(Azerbaijan)	MF	Tofig Mikayilov	3	0	0	0	3	0
23	(Azerbaijan)	MF	Tural Rzayev	1	0	0	0	1	0
24	(Azerbaijan)	MF	Amit Guluzade	7	0	0	0	7	0
29	(Azerbaijan)	FW	Amil Yunanov	1	0	0	0	1	0
39	(Azerbaijan)	MF	Emin Mehdiyev	11	2	1	0	12	2
55	(Azerbaijan)	FW	Aghabala Ramazanov	7	1	0	0	7	1
70	(Azerbaijan)	FW	Vagif Javadov	3	0	0	0	3	0
97	(Azerbaijan)	MF	Khayal Najafov	1	0	0	0	1	0
99	(Azerbaijan)	DF	Rasim Ramaldanov	4	0	0	0	4	0
Players who left Sumgayit during the season:
1	(Azerbaijan)	GK	Shahrudin Mahammadaliyev	3	0	0	0	3	0
8	(Azerbaijan)	MF	Nuran Gurbanov	2	0	0	0	2	0
9	(Azerbaijan)	MF	Mirzaga Huseynpur	1	0	0	0	1	0
15	(Azerbaijan)	DF	Nodar Mammadov	2	0	1	0	3	0
16	(Azerbaijan)	FW	Elnur Abdulov	1	0	0	0	1	0
			TOTALS	97	8	5	0	102	8

== Notes ==
- Qarabağ have played their home games at the Tofiq Bahramov Stadium since 1993 due to the ongoing situation in Quzanlı.
