= 2013–14 Sumgayit FK season =

Sumgayit
2013-14 season
- President: Kamran Guliyev
- Manager: Agil Mammadov
- Stadium: Mehdi Huseynzade Stadium
- Premier League: 9th
- Azerbaijan Cup: Second Round vs Baku
- Top goalscorer: League: Pardis Fardjad-Azad (6); All: Pardis Fardjad-Azad (6)
- Highest home attendance: 6,000 vs Gabala; 19 August 2013
- Lowest home attendance: 100 vs Gabala; 2 February 2014
- Average home league attendance: 1,666; 3 April 2014
Home colours	Away colours

The Sumgayit 2013–14 season was Sumgayit's third Azerbaijan Premier League season. They finished 9th in the Premier League and they reached the Second Round of the Azerbaijan Cup where they were beaten by FK Baku. It is Agil Mammadov's first full season as manager.

== Squad ==
As of match played 17 May 2014

No.	Name	Nationality	Position	Date of birth (age)	Signed from	Signed in	Contract ends	Apps.	Goals
Goalkeepers
1	Andrey Popovich	(Azerbaijan)	GK	19 March 1993 (aged 21)	Tavşanlı Linyitspor	2014		39	0
63	Shahrudin Mahammadaliyev	(Azerbaijan)	GK	12 June 1994 (aged 19)	Trainee	2012		7	0
94	Tarlan Ahmadli	(Azerbaijan)	GK	21 November 1994 (aged 19)	Ravan Baku	2012		2	0
Defenders
2	Shahriyar Khalilov	(Azerbaijan)	DF	21 August 1991 (aged 22)	Khazar Lankaran	2014		10	0
3	Vurğun Hüseynov	(Azerbaijan)	DF	25 April 1988 (aged 26)	Gabala	2013		22	0
4	Samir Abbasov	(Azerbaijan)	DF	1 February 1978 (aged 36)	Qarabağ	2011		84	3
5	Kamil Huseynov	(Azerbaijan)	DF	4 February 1992 (aged 22)	Qarabağ	2014		1	0
15	Nodar Mammadov	(Azerbaijan)	DF	3 June 1988 (aged 25)	Ravan Baku	2013		24	0
17	Adil Ibragimov	(Russia)	DF	23 April 1989 (aged 25)	Fakel Voronezh	2013		33	0
20	Elşad Manafov	(Azerbaijan)	DF	8 March 1992 (aged 22)	loan from FC Baku	2014		0	0
21	Mahammad Mirzabeyov	(Russia)	DF	16 November 1990 (aged 23)	Anzhi Makhachkala	2012		62	1
92	Bakhtiyar Hasanalizade	(Azerbaijan)	DF	29 December 1992 (aged 21)	Trainee	2011		39	0
Midfielders
8	Agshin Mukhtaroglu	(Azerbaijan)	MF	16 June 1992 (aged 21)	Trainee	2012		34	1
9	Tarzin Jahangirov	(Azerbaijan)	MF	17 January 1992 (aged 22)	loan from Gabala	2014		18	1
10	Uğur Pamuk	(Azerbaijan)	MF	1 May 1995 (aged 19)	loan from Khazar Lankaran	2014		41	5
11	Ruslan Nasirli	(Azerbaijan)	MF	12 October 1995 (aged 18)	Trainee	2011		25	1
14	Magomed Kurbanov	(Azerbaijan)	MF	11 April 1992 (aged 22)	Taganrog	2014		14	5
18	Aleksandr Chertoganov	(Azerbaijan)	MF	8 February 1980 (aged 34)	Gabala	2013		32	0
25	Farid Kerimzade	(Azerbaijan)	MF	5 April 1997 (aged 17)	Trainee	2013		2	0
76	Bayram Nuruzädä	(Azerbaijan)	MF	29 March 1996 (aged 18)	Trainee	2013		1	0
88	Mirzaga Huseynpur	(Azerbaijan)	MF	11 March 1990 (aged 24)	MITOS Novocherkassk	2013		37	3
	Nasyr Abilayev	(Russia)	MF	19 November 1995 (aged 18)	Lokomotiv Moscow	2014		0	0
Forwards
7	Pardis Fardjad-Azad	(Azerbaijan)	FW	12 April 1988 (aged 26)	Berliner AK	2012		49	15
77	Ramil Mansurov	(Azerbaijan)	FW	30 September 1993 (aged 20)	Inter Baku	2014		3	0
99	Rahman Hajiyev	(Azerbaijan)	FW	25 July 1993 (aged 20)	FC Baku	2014		18	3
Left during the season
1	Anar Nazirov	(Azerbaijan)	GK	8 September 1985 (aged 28)	Gabala	2013		17	0
2	Slavik Alkhasov	(Azerbaijan)	DF	6 February 1993 (aged 21)	loan from Neftchi Baku	2011	2013	65	1
5	Karim Diniyev	(Azerbaijan)	DF	5 September 1993 (aged 20)	loan from Neftchi Baku	2013	2013	9	0
9	Orkhan Aliyev	(Azerbaijan)	MF	21 December 1995 (aged 18)	Trainee	2011		47	10
10	Ruslan Gurbanov	(Azerbaijan)	FW	12 September 1991 (aged 22)	loan from Neftchi Baku	2011	2013	54	8
12	Elchin Sadigov	(Azerbaijan)	GK	14 June 1989 (aged 24)	Neftchi Baku	2012		9	0
20	Sabir Allahquliyev	(Azerbaijan)	FW	12 May 1988 (aged 26)	Kapaz	2012		26	2
22	Zaur Hashimov	(Azerbaijan)	DF	25 August 1981 (aged 32)	Qarabağ	2013		2	0
27	Nurlan Novruzov	(Azerbaijan)	FW	3 March 1993 (aged 21)	loan from FC Baku	2013	2013	16	1
88	Elshan Abdullayev	(Azerbaijan)	FW	5 February 1994 (aged 20)	loan from Neftchi Baku	2013	2013	18	1
91	Vugar Asgarov	(Azerbaijan)	FW	14 May 1985 (aged 29)	Liepājas Metalurgs	2013		12	2

== Transfers ==
=== Summer ===
In: Note: Flags indicate national team as defined under FIFA eligibility rules; some limited exceptions apply. Players may hold more than one non-FIFA nationality.

No.	Pos.	Nation	Player
1	GK	AZE	Anar Nazirov (from (Azerbaijan) Gabala)
2	DF	AZE	Slavik Alkhasov (loan extended from (Azerbaijan) Neftchi Baku)
3	DF	AZE	Vurğun Hüseynov (from (Azerbaijan) Gabala)
5	DF	AZE	Karim Diniyev (loan from (Azerbaijan) Neftchi Baku)
10	FW	AZE	Ruslan Qurbanov (loan from (Azerbaijan) Neftchi Baku)
17	DF	RUS	Adil Ibragimov (from (Russia) Fakel Voronezh)
15	DF	AZE	Nodar Mammadov (from (Azerbaijan) Ravan Baku)
18	MF	AZE	Aleksandr Chertoganov (from (Azerbaijan) Gabala)
22	DF	AZE	Zaur Hashimov (from (Azerbaijan) Qarabağ)
27	FW	AZE	Nurlan Novruzov (loan from (Azerbaijan) Baku)
88	FW	AZE	Elshan Abdullayev (loan extended from (Azerbaijan) Neftchi Baku)
91	FW	AZE	Vugar Asgarov (from (Latvia) Liepājas Metalurgs)
—	MF	AZE	Budag Nasirov (frin (Azerbaijan) Turan Tovuz)
—	DF	AZE	Saşa Yunisoğlu (from (Azerbaijan) AZAL)

Out: Note: Flags indicate national team as defined under FIFA eligibility rules; some limited exceptions apply. Players may hold more than one non-FIFA nationality.

No.	Pos.	Nation	Player
1	GK	AZE	Salahat Aghayev (loan return to (Azerbaijan) Inter Baku)
3	DF	GER	Murat Doymuş (to other (Germany) Viktoria 1889)
5	MF	AZE	Aftandil Hajiyev
6	MF	TUR	Taner Taktak (to (Turkey) Fethiyespor)
13	MF	AZE	Murad Ağayev (to (Azerbaijan) AZAL)
17	MF	AZE	Emin Jafarguliyev (to (Azerbaijan) AZAL)
22	DF	RUS	Khayal Mustafayev
50	FW	AZE	Murad Hüseynov (to (Serbia) Sloboda Užice)
76	MF	TUR	Can Akgün (to (Turkey) Bayrampaşaspor)
86	DF	AZE	Eldar Jankishiyev (loan return to (Russia) Anzhi Makhachkala)
—	DF	AZE	Saşa Yunisoğlu (to (Turkey) Denizlispor)

=== Winter ===
In: Note: Flags indicate national team as defined under FIFA eligibility rules; some limited exceptions apply. Players may hold more than one non-FIFA nationality.

No.	Pos.	Nation	Player
1	GK	AZE	Andrey Popoviç (from (Turkey) Tavşanlı Linyitspor)
2	DF	AZE	Shahriyar Khalilov (from (Azerbaijan) Gabala)
5	DF	AZE	Kamil Huseynov (from (Azerbaijan) Qarabağ)
9	MF	AZE	Tarzin Jahangirov (loan from (Azerbaijan) Gabala)
10	MF	AZE	Uğur Pamuk (loan from (Azerbaijan) Khazar Lankaran)
14	MF	AZE	Magomed Kurbanov (from (Russia) Taganrog)
77	FW	AZE	Ramil Mansurov (from (Azerbaijan) Inter Baku)
99	MF	AZE	Rahman Hajiyev (loan from (Azerbaijan) Baku)

Out: Note: Flags indicate national team as defined under FIFA eligibility rules; some limited exceptions apply. Players may hold more than one non-FIFA nationality.

No.	Pos.	Nation	Player
1	GK	AZE	Anar Nazirov (to (Azerbaijan) Gabala)
2	DF	AZE	Slavik Alkhasov (loan return to (Azerbaijan) Neftchi Baku)
5	DF	AZE	Karim Diniyev (loan return to (Azerbaijan) Neftchi Baku)
9	FW	AZE	Orkhan Aliyev (to (Azerbaijan) Khazar Lankaran)
10	FW	AZE	Ruslan Qurbanov (loan return to (Azerbaijan) Neftchi Baku)
12	GK	AZE	Elchin Sadigov (to (Azerbaijan) AZAL)
18	MF	AZE	Aleksandr Chertoganov (Retired)
20	FW	AZE	Sabir Allahquliyev
22	DF	AZE	Zaur Hashimov
27	FW	AZE	Nurlan Novruzov (loan return to (Azerbaijan) Baku)
88	FW	AZE	Elshan Abdullayev (loan return to (Azerbaijan) Neftchi Baku)
91	FW	AZE	Vugar Asgarov

== Friendlies ==
10 January 2014	Sumgayit	0 – 0	Ravan Baku	Sumqayit
16:00 AZT (UTC+4)		Summary		Stadium: Mehdi Huseynzade Stadium

15 January 2014	Sumgayit	0 – 1	Araz
AZT (UTC+4)		[ Summary]	Janalidze

18 January 2014	Sumgayit	2 - 1	AZAL
AZT (UTC+4)		[ Summary]

23 January 2014	Sumgayit	1 - 2	Shahdag
AZT (UTC+4)		Summary

== Competitions ==
=== Azerbaijan Premier League ===
==== Results summary ====
Overall								Home						Away					
Pld	W	D	L	GF	GA	GD	Pts	W	D	L	GF	GA	GD	W	D	L	GF	GA	GD
36	5	10	21	27	61	−34	25	4	5	9	13	22	−9	1	5	12	14	39	−25

Last updated: 18 May 2014.
Source: Soccerway

==== Results by round ====
Round	1	2	3	4	5	6	7	8	9	10	11	12	13	14	15	16	17	18	19	20	21	22	23	24	25	26	27	28	29	30	31	32	33	34	35	36
Ground	H	A	H	A	H	A	A	A	H	H	A	H	A	H	H	H	A	A	H	A	H	A	H	A	H	H	A	H	A	H	A	H	A	A	H	A
Result	D	L	W	L	L	L	D	L	L	L	L	D	D	L	L	L	L	L	L	D	D	L	W	D	L	L	L	W	D	D	W	D	L	L	W	L
Position	6	7	6	7	7	8	8	9	10	10	10	10	10	10	10	10	10	10	10	10	10	10	9	10	10	10	10	10	10	9	9	9	9	9	9	9

Source: Soccerway
A = Away; H = Home; W = Win; D = Draw; L = Loss

==== Results ====
4 August 2013 1	Sumgayit	1 – 1	Khazar Lankaran	Sumgayit
18:30 AZST (UTC+5)	Asgarov 41'	Summary	Nildo 64'	Stadium: Mehdi Huseynzade Stadium; Attendance: 5,000; Referee: Rauf Jabbarov

11 August 2013 2	Qarabağ	5 – 1	Sumgayit	Baku
20:00 AZST (UTC+5)	Gelashvili 32'; Chumbinho 50', 78'; Reynaldo 63', 90+1'	Summary	E.Abdullayev 65'; Hüseynov (yellow card) 57' (yellow-red card) 82'	Stadium: Tofiq Bahramov Stadium^{1} Attendance: 1,000; Referee: Vusal Aliyev

19 August 2013 3	Sumgayit	2 – 1	Gabala	Sumqayit
18:00 AZST (UTC+5)	Asgarov 4'; R.Gurbanov 62' (pen.)	Summary	Kamanan 14'; Levin (yellow card) 51' (yellow-red card) 61'	Stadium: Mehdi Huseynzade Stadium; Attendance: 6,000; Referee: Orkhan Mämmädov

23 August 2013 4	AZAL	1 – 0	Sumgayit	Baku
19:00 AZST (UTC+5)	John 45+1'	Summary	K.Diniyev (yellow card) 12' (yellow-red card) 54'; Mirzabekov (red card) 73'	Stadium: AZAl Arena; Attendance: 200; Referee: Vusal Aliyev

31 August 2013 5	Sumgayit	0 – 1	Ravan Baku	Sumqayit
18:00 AZST (UTC+5)		Summary	Nurähmädov 50'; Abbasov (yellow card) 68' (yellow-red card) 89'	Stadium: Mehdi Huseynzade Stadium; Attendance: 1,700; Referee: Fariz Yusifov

15 September 2013 6	Simurq	3 – 1	Sumgayit	Zaqatala
17:00 AZST (UTC+5)	Poljak 22', 42'; Ćeran 37'	Summary	E.Abdullayev 90+2'	Stadium: Zaqatala City Stadium; Attendance: 150; Referee: Rahim Häsänov

21 September 2013 7	Neftchi Baku	0 – 0	Sumgayit	Baku
19:00 AZST (UTC+5)		Summary		Stadium: Bakcell Arena; Attendance: 1,500; Referee: Aliyar Ağayev

28 September 2013 8	Baku	1 – 0	Sumgayit	Baku
16:00 AZST (UTC+5)	Kalonas 62'	Summary		Stadium: Tofik Bakhramov Stadium; Referee: Venera Kahric Muradova

4 October 2013 9	Sumgayit	0 – 2	Inter Baku	Sumqayit
16:00 AZST (UTC+5)	R.Gurbanov (yellow card) 28' (yellow-red card) 66'	Summary	Ibragimov 14' (o.g.); Javadov 31'	Stadium: Mehdi Huseynzade Stadium; Attendance: 300; Referee: Rahim Häsänov

20 October 2013 10	Sumgayit	0 – 3	Qarabağ	Sumqayit
16:00 AZST (UTC+5)		Summary	Nazirov 5' (o.g.); Reynaldo 56'; Muarem 60'	Stadium: Mehdi Huseynzade Stadium; Attendance: 1,500; Referee: Omar Paşayev

25 October 2013 11	Gabala	2 – 0	Sumgayit	Qabala
15:00 AZST (UTC+5)	Subotić 23'; Dodô 64'	Summary		Stadium: Gabala City Stadium; Attendance: Rahim Häsänov; Referee: 500

3 November 2013 12	Sumgayit	0 – 0	AZAL	Sumqayit
15:00 AZT (UTC+4)		Summary		Stadium: Mehdi Huseynzade Stadium; Attendance: 1,000; Referee: Fariz Yusifov

8 November 2013 13	Ravan Baku	1 – 1	Sumgayit	Baku
17:00 AZT (UTC+4)	Javadov 15'	Summary	Fardjad-Azad 45'	Stadium: Bayil Stadium; Attendance: 500; Referee: Aliyar Ağayev

22 November 2013 14	Sumgayit	0 – 1	Simurq	Sumqayit
17:00 AZT (UTC+4)		Summary	Poljak 42'	Stadium: Mehdi Huseynzade Stadium; Attendance: 700; Referee: Vusal Aliyev

30 November 2013 15	Sumgayit	1 – 2	Neftchi Baku	Sumqayit
17:00 AZT (UTC+4)	Novruzov 35'; Abbasov (red card) 90'	Summary	Cardoso 23'; Ramos 85'	Stadium: Mehdi Huseynzade Stadium; Attendance: 1,000; Referee: Fariz Yusifov

8 December 2013 16	Sumgayit	1 – 2	Baku	Sumqayit
17:00 AZT (UTC+4)	Mario 63' (o.g.); R.Gurbanov (red card) 90+2'	Summary	Mario 5'; Šolić 49' (pen.)	Stadium: Mehdi Huseynzade Stadium; Attendance: 500; Referee: Rauf Jabbarov

14 December 2013 17	Inter Baku	2 – 0	Sumgayit	Baku
17:00 AZT (UTC+4)	A.Abatsiyev 32'; Javadov 88'	Summary		Stadium: Shafa Stadium; Attendance: 250; Referee: Orkhan Mämmädov

20 December 2013 18	Khazar Lankaran	4 – 3	Sumgayit	Lankaran
15:00 AZT (UTC+4)	Sadio 18'; Sacconi 26'; Etame 45+1', 51'	Summary	O.Aliyev 37'; Fardjad-Azad 80' (pen.); R.Nasirli 82'	Stadium: Lankaran City Stadium; Attendance: 3,000; Referee: Ramil Ähmädov

2 February 2014 19	Sumgayit	0 – 3	Gabala	Baku
14:30 AZST (UTC+4)		Summary	Mendy 3'; Ebecilio 55'; Leonardo 57'	Stadium: Bayil Stadium; Attendance: 100; Referee: Rahim Hasanov

7 February 2014 20	AZAL	2 – 2	Sumgayit	Baku
15:00 AZT (UTC+4)	N.Turković 45'; Igbekoi 80'	Summary	Jahangirov 60'; Fardjad-Azad 89' (pen.)	Stadium: AZAL Arena; Attendance: 300; Referee: Elvin Äsgärov

15 February 2014 21	Sumgayit	1 – 1	Ravan Baku	Sumqayit
16:00 AZT (UTC+4)	Hajiyev 24'	Summary	Adamović 43'	Stadium: Mehdi Huseynzade Stadium; Attendance: 1,200; Referee: Fariz Yusifov

19 February 2014 22	Simurq	4 – 0	Sumgayit	Baku
16:00 AZT (UTC+4)	Ćeran 15' (pen.), 51'; Weitzman 22'; Ballo 90+2'	Summary	Hüseynov (yellow card) 14' (yellow-red card) 32'	Stadium: Shafa Stadium; Attendance: 1,000; Referee: Alik Yunusov

23 February 2014 23	Sumgayit	2 – 0	Neftchi Baku	Sumqayit
15:00 AZT (UTC+4)	Mirzaga Huseynpur 38', 70'	Summary		Stadium: Mehdi Huseynzade Stadium; Attendance: 1,500; Referee: Rauf Jabbarov

28 February 2014 24	Baku	0 – 0	Sumgayit	Baku
14:00 AZT (UTC+4)		Summary	N.Mammadov (yellow card) 58' (yellow-red card) 60'	Stadium: Tofik Bakhramov Stadium Training Ground^{2} Attendance: 250; Referee: Orkhan Mämmädov

8 March 2014 25	Sumgayit	0 – 1	Inter Baku	Sumqayit
14:00 AZT (UTC+4)		Summary	Javadov 63'	Stadium: Mehdi Huseynzade Stadium; Attendance: 2,500; Referee: Rahim Häsänov

16 March 2014 26	Sumgayit	0 – 1	Khazar Lankaran	Sumqayit
15:00 AZT (UTC+4)		Summary	Blaževski 65' (pen.)	Stadium: Mehdi Huseynzade Stadium; Attendance: 1,100; Referee: Alik Yunusov

23 March 2014 27	Qarabağ	3 – 0	Sumgayit	Baku
17:00 AZT (UTC+4)	Reynaldo 70', 72'; Richard 76'	Summary		Stadium: Tofiq Bahramov Stadium^{1} Attendance: 800; Referee: Vusal Aliyev

28 March 2014 28	Sumgayit	2 – 1	AZAL	Sumqayit
15:00 AZT (UTC+4)	Kurbanov 21'; Pamuk 55'	Summary	L.Kasradze 7'	Stadium: Mehdi Huseynzade Stadium; Attendance: 900; Referee: Fariz Yusifov

5 April 2014 29	Ravan Baku	1 – 1	Sumgayit	Baku
17:00 AZST (UTC+5)	Miracema 68'	Summary	Kurbanov 23'	Stadium: Bayil Stadium; Attendance: 650; Referee: Orkhan Mämmädov

11 April 2014 30	Sumgayit	1 – 1	Simurq	Sumgayit
15:00 AZST (UTC+5)	Hajiyev 71'	Summary	Ćeran 68'	Stadium: Mehdi Huseynzade Stadium; Attendance: 3,000; Referee: Omar Paşayev

20 April 2014 31	Neftchi Baku	1 – 3	Sumgayit	Baku
17:00 AZST (UTC+5)	Abdullayev (red card) 90+2'; R.Gurbanov 90+3'	Summary	R.Hajiyev 20'; Pamuk 51'; Pamuk (yellow card) 61' (yellow-red card) 66'; Fardjad-Azad 78'	Stadium: Bakcell Arena; Attendance: 1,000; Referee: Elvin Äsgärov

27 April 2014 32	Sumgayit	1 – 1	Baku	Sumqayit
16:00 AZST (UTC+5)	Fardjad-Azad 47'	Summary	Ristović 69'	Stadium: Mehdi Huseynzade Stadium; Attendance: 1,500; Referee: Vusal Aliyev

2 May 2014 33	Inter Baku	2 – 0	Sumgayit	Baku
17:00 AZST (UTC+5)	Iashvili 51'; Javadov 90+2'	Summary		Stadium: Shafa Stadium; Attendance: 350; Referee: Rauf Jabbarov

7 May 2014 34	Khazar Lankaran	4 – 1	Sumgayit	Lankaran
18:00 AZST (UTC+5)	Tounkara 11', 45'; Etame 22'; Elias 56'	Summary	Kurbanov 3'	Stadium: Lankaran City Stadium; Attendance: 1,000; Referee: Vusal Aliyev

12 May 2014 35	Sumgayit	1 – 0	Qarabağ	Sumqayit
18:00 AZST (UTC+5)	Kurbanov 49'	Summary		Stadium: Mehdi Huseynzade Stadium; Attendance: 1,350; Referee: Rauf Jabbarov

17 May 2014 36	Gabala	3 – 1	Sumgayit	Qabala
17:00 AZST (UTC+5)	Mendy 39'; Ebecilio 89'; Afolabi 90+1'	Summary	Kurbanov 7'	Stadium: Gabala City Stadium; Attendance: 2,000; Referee: Elvin Äsgärov

==== League table ====
Pos	Team	Pld	W	D	L	GF	GA	GD	Pts	Qualification or relegation
6	Khazar Lankaran	36	12	13	11	44	49	−5	49	
7	Simurq	36	11	13	12	35	28	+7	46	
8	AZAL	36	6	13	17	29	49	−20	31	
9	Sumgayit	36	5	10	21	27	61	−34	25	
10	Ravan Baku (R)	36	4	10	22	22	66	−44	22	Relegation to Azerbaijan First Division

Source: Azerbaijan Professional Football league
Rules for classification: 1) points; 2) goal difference; 3) number of goals scored.
(R) Relegated

=== Azerbaijan Cup ===
4 December 2013 Second Round	Baku	2 – 1	Sumgayit	Baku
13:00 AZT (UTC+4)	Šolić 59' (pen.); Ristović 90+3'	Summary	S.Alkhasov 86'	Stadium: Tofik Bakhramov Stadium Training Ground; Attendance: 300; Referee: Vusal Aliyev

== Squad statistics ==
As of Match played 17 May 2014

=== Appearances and goals ===
No.	Pos	Nat	Player	Total		Premier League		Azerbaijan Cup	
No.	Pos	Nat	Player	Apps	Goals	Apps	Goals	Apps	Goals
1	GK	(Azerbaijan) AZE	Andrey Popoviç	10	0	10+0	0	0+0	0
2	DF	(Azerbaijan) AZE	Shahriyar Khalilov	10	0	3+7	0	0+0	0
3	DF	(Azerbaijan) AZE	Vurğun Hüseynov	22	0	21+1	0	0+0	0
4	DF	(Azerbaijan) AZE	Samir Abbasov	27	0	22+4	0	1+0	0
5	DF	(Azerbaijan) AZE	Kamil Huseynov	1	0	0+1	0	0+0	0
7	FW	(Azerbaijan) AZE	Pardis Fardjad-Azad	25	6	21+3	6	1+0	0
8	MF	(Azerbaijan) AZE	Agshin Mukhtaroglu	20	0	10+10	0	0+0	0
9	MF	(Azerbaijan) AZE	Tarzin Jahangirov	18	1	18+0	1	0+0	0
10	MF	(Azerbaijan) AZE	Uğur Pamuk	13	2	13+0	2	0+0	0
11	FW	(Azerbaijan) AZE	Ruslan Nasirli	15	1	5+9	1	0+1	0
14	MF	(Russia) RUS	Magomed Kurbanov	14	5	9+5	5	0+0	0
15	DF	(Azerbaijan) AZE	Nodar Mammadov	24	0	20+3	0	0+1	0
17	DF	(Russia) RUS	Adil Ibragimov	33	0	28+4	0	1+0	0
18	MF	(Azerbaijan) AZE	Aleksandr Chertoganov	32	0	27+4	0	1+0	0
21	MF	(Russia) RUS	Magomed Mirzabekov	34	0	32+1	0	1+0	0
25	MF	(Azerbaijan) AZE	Farid Kerimzade	2	0	0+2	0	0+0	0
63	GK	(Azerbaijan) AZE	Shahrudin Mahammadaliyev	7	0	7+0	0	0+0	0
76	MF	(Azerbaijan) AZE	Bayram Nuruzädä	1	0	0+1	0	0+0	0
77	FW	(Azerbaijan) AZE	Ramil Mansurov	3	0	1+2	0	0+0	0
88	MF	(Azerbaijan) AZE	Mirzaga Huseynpur	23	2	17+5	2	0+1	0
92	DF	(Azerbaijan) AZE	Bakhtiyar Hasanalizade	23	0	18+4	0	1+0	0
94	GK	(Azerbaijan) AZE	Tarlan Ahmadli	2	0	1+1	0	0+0	0
99	FW	(Azerbaijan) AZE	Rahman Hajiyev	18	3	18+0	3	0+0	0
Players who appeared for Sumgayit no longer at the club:
1	GK	(Azerbaijan) AZE	Anar Nazirov	17	0	17+0	0	0+0	0
2	DF	(Azerbaijan) AZE	Slavik Alkhasov	15	1	14+0	0	1+0	1
5	DF	(Azerbaijan) AZE	Karim Diniyev	9	0	5+4	0	0+0	0
9	FW	(Azerbaijan) AZE	Orkhan Aliyev	10	1	7+2	1	1+0	0
10	FW	(Azerbaijan) AZE	Ruslan Qurbanov	14	0	12+2	0	0+0	0
12	GK	(Azerbaijan) AZE	Elchin Sadigov	2	0	1+0	0	1+0	0
20	FW	(Azerbaijan) AZE	Sabir Allahquliyev	1	0	0+1	0	0+0	0
22	DF	(Azerbaijan) AZE	Zaur Hashimov	2	0	1+1	0	0+0	0
27	FW	(Azerbaijan) AZE	Nurlan Novruzov	16	1	13+2	1	1+0	0
88	FW	(Azerbaijan) AZE	Elshan Abdullayev	18	1	15+2	1	1+0	0
91	FW	(Azerbaijan) AZE	Vugar Asgarov	12	2	9+3	2	0+0	0

=== Goal scorers ===
Place	Position	Nation	Number	Name	Premier League	Azerbaijan Cup	Total
1	FW	(Azerbaijan)	7	Pardis Fardjad-Azad	6	0	6
2	MF	(Russia)	14	Magomed Kurbanov	5	0	5
3	FW	(Azerbaijan)	99	Rahman Hajiyev	3	0	3
4	FW	(Azerbaijan)	91	Vugar Asgarov	2	0	2
4	MF	(Azerbaijan)	88	Mirzaga Huseynpur	2	0	2
4	MF	(Azerbaijan)	10	Uğur Pamuk	2	0	2
7	FW	(Azerbaijan)	88	Elshan Abdullayev	1	0	1
7	FW	(Azerbaijan)	10	Ruslan Qurbanov	1	0	1
7	FW	(Azerbaijan)	27	Nurlan Novruzov	1	0	1
7	FW	(Azerbaijan)	9	Orkhan Aliyev	1	0	1
7	FW	(Azerbaijan)	11	Ruslan Nasirli	1	0	1
7	MF	(Azerbaijan)	9	Tarzin Jahangirov	1	0	1
7				Own goal	1	0	1
7	DF	(Azerbaijan)	2	Slavik Alkhasov	0	1	1
				TOTALS	27	1	28

=== Disciplinary record ===
Number	Nation	Position	Name	Premier League		Azerbaijan Cup		Total	
Number	Nation	Position	Name	Yellow card	Red card	Yellow card	Red card	Yellow card	Red card
1	(Azerbaijan)	GK	Andrey Popoviç	2	0	0	0	2	0
2	(Azerbaijan)	DF	Shahriyar Khalilov	1	0	0	0	1	0
3	(Azerbaijan)	DF	Vurğun Hüseynov	9	2	0	0	9	2
4	(Azerbaijan)	DF	Samir Abbasov	6	1	1	0	7	1
7	(Azerbaijan)	FW	Pardis Fardjad-Azad	9	0	0	0	9	0
10	(Azerbaijan)	MF	Uğur Pamuk	4	1	0	0	4	1
11	(Azerbaijan)	FW	Ruslan Nasirli	1	0	0	0	1	0
14	(Azerbaijan)	MF	Magomed Kurbanov	2	0	0	0	2	0
15	(Azerbaijan)	DF	Nodar Mammadov	6	1	0	0	6	1
17	(Russia)	DF	Adil Ibragimov	7	0	0	0	7	0
18	(Azerbaijan)	MF	Aleksandr Chertoganov	4	0	0	0	4	0
21	(Russia)	MF	Magomed Mirzabekov	4	1	0	0	4	1
64	(Azerbaijan)	GK	Shahrudin Mahammadaliyev	1	0	0	0	1	0
88	(Azerbaijan)	MF	Mirzaga Huseynpur	1	0	0	0	1	0
92	(Azerbaijan)	DF	Bakhtiyar Hasanalizade	4	0	0	0	4	0
99	(Azerbaijan)	FW	Rahman Hajiyev	1	0	0	0	1	0
Players who left Sumgayit during the season:
1	(Azerbaijan)	GK	Anar Nazirov	3	0	0	0	3	0
2	(Azerbaijan)	DF	Slavik Alkhasov	6	0	0	0	6	0
5	(Azerbaijan)	DF	Karim Diniyev	2	1	0	0	2	1
10	(Azerbaijan)	FW	Ruslan Gurbanov	3	2	0	0	3	2
27	(Azerbaijan)	FW	Nurlan Novruzov	2	0	1	0	3	0
88	(Azerbaijan)	FW	Elshan Abdullayev	3	0	0	0	3	0
91	(Azerbaijan)	FW	Vugar Asgarov	2	0	0	0	2	0
			TOTALS	83	9	2	0	85	9
