= Kiyan Soltanpour =

Azerbaijani-Iranian footballer (born 1989)

Personal information
- Date of birth: 23 July 1989 (age 37)
- Place of birth: Berlin-Charlottenburg, West Germany
- Height: 1.90 m (6 ft 3 in)
- Position: Striker

Team information
- Current team: TuS Makkabi Berlin
- Number: 26

Youth career
- 1994–1999: NFC Rot-Weiß Berlin
- 1999–2001: BSG Brandenburg
- 2001–: FC Spandau 06
- –2008: Hertha Zehlendorf

Senior career*
Years	Team	Apps	(Gls)
2008–2011	Union Berlin II	91	(54)
2011–2012	Borussia Dortmund II	22	(3)
2013	Saarbrücken	4	(0)
2013	Saarbrücken II	3	(0)
2013–2014	Berliner AK	27	(11)
2014	Sumgayit	11	(3)
2015–2016	Viktoria 1889	21	(6)
2015–2016	Viktoria 1889 II	7	(5)
2016–2017	Luckenwalde	25	(2)
2017–2018	Blau-Weiß 90 Berlin	14	(3)
2018–2019	Berliner SC	27	(10)
2019–2020	1. FC Wilmersdorf		
2020	FC Brandenburg 03 Berlin	5	(0)
2020–	TuS Makkabi Berlin	24	(4)
- * Club domestic league appearances and goals as of 13 November 2022 ‡ National team caps and goals as of 16 August 2014

Kiyan Soltanpour (Persian: کیان سلطانپور; born 23 July 1989) is an Azerbaijani-Iranian footballer who plays for German club TuS Makkabi Berlin.

== Career ==
=== Club ===
Kiyan Soltanpour made his Sumgayit FK first-team debut on 16 August 2014 against Khazar Lankaran FK. He made his first goal in Sumgayit FK on 30 August 2014 against Araz-Naxçıvan PFK.

=== International ===
Born to an Iranian father and an Azerbaijani mother, Soltanpour was eligible to play for the Iran national football team as well as Azerbaijan. In 2014, he accepted a call up from the Azerbaijan national football team.

== Career statistics ==
As of 12 May 2019

Club	Division	Season	League		Cup		Other		Total	
Club	Division	Season	Apps	Goals	Apps	Goals	Apps	Goals	Apps	Goals
Union Berlin II	Oberliga	2010–11	28	19	0	0	–		28	19
Borussia Dortmund II	Regionalliga	2011–12	16	3	0	0	–		16	3
Borussia Dortmund II	3. Liga	2012–13	6	0	0	0	–		6	0
Borussia Dortmund II	Total		22	3	0	0	–		22	3
Saarbrücken	3. Liga	2012-13	4	0	0	0	–		4	0
Saarbrücken II	Oberliga	2012-13	3	0	0	0	–		3	0
Berliner AK 07	Regionalliga	2013-14	27	11	0	0	–		27	11
Sumgayit	APL	2014-15	11	3	1	0	–		12	3
Viktoria 1889	Regionalliga	2014-15	13	4	0	0	1	1	14	5
Viktoria 1889	Regionalliga	2015-16	8	2	0	0	1	0	9	2
Viktoria 1889	Total		21	6	0	0	2	1	23	7
Viktoria 1889 II	Landesliga	2015-16	7	5	0	0	–		7	5
Luckenwalde	Regionalliga	2016-17	25	2	0	0	5	7	30	9
Blau-Weiß 90 Berlin	Berlin-Liga	2017-18	14	3	0	0	1	5	15	8
Berliner SC	Berlin-Liga	2018-19	25	8	0	0	1	0	26	8
Career total			187	60	1	0	9	13	197	73
