= Magomed Kurbanov (footballer) =

Ukrainian-born Russian-Azerbaijani footballer (born 1992)

Personal information
- Full name: Magomed Arsenovich Kurbanov
- Date of birth: 11 April 1992 (age 34)
- Place of birth: Sorokyne, Ukraine
- Height: 1.79 m (5 ft 10 in)
- Position: Striker

Youth career
- Rostov

Senior career*
Years	Team	Apps	(Gls)
2012–2013	Rostov	1	(0)
2013	Taganrog	12	(0)
2014–2017	Sumgayit	67	(20)
2015–2016	→ Neftchi Baku (loan)	13	(0)
2017–2018	Kapaz	6	(0)
2018	Sabah	10	(2)

International career
2008	Azerbaijan-17		
2014	Azerbaijan-21	1	(0)
2015	Azerbaijan	3	(0)
- * Club domestic league appearances and goals

Magomed Arsenovich Kurbanov (Azerbaijani: Məhəmməd Qurbanov; born 11 April 1992) is a Ukrainian-born Russian-Azerbaijani former professional football player.

== Career ==
=== Club ===
He made his debut in the Russian Premier League on 7 December 2012 for FC Rostov in a game against FC Krasnodar.

On 31 January 2014, Kurbanov signed a two-year contract with Sumgayit FK in the Azerbaijan Premier League.

On 11 October 2017, Kurbanov signed for Kapaz PFK until the end of the 2017–18 season, but left the club at his request on 2 January 2018. On 6 February 2018, Kurbanov signed for Sabah FK.

=== International career ===
Kurbanov made his debut for the Azerbaijan U21 national team on 9 September 2014 against Portugal, coming on as an 86th-minute substitute for Agabala Ramazanov.

== Career statistics ==
=== Club ===
As of match played 14 December 2017

Appearances and goals by club, season and competition
Club	Season	League			National Cup		Continental		Other		Total	
Club	Season	Division	Apps	Goals	Apps	Goals	Apps	Goals	Apps	Goals	Apps	Goals
Rostov	2012–13	Russian Premier League	1	0	0	0	–		–		1	0
Taganrog	2013–14	National Football League	12	0	0	0	–		–		12	0
Sumgayit	2013–14	Azerbaijan Premier League	14	5	0	0	—		—		14	5
Sumgayit	2014–15	Azerbaijan Premier League	31	13	0	0	—		—		31	13
Sumgayit	2015–16	Azerbaijan Premier League	0	0	0	0	—		—		0	0
Sumgayit	2016–17	Azerbaijan Premier League	22	2	2	1	—		—		24	3
Sumgayit	Total		67	20	2	1	-	-	-	-	69	21
Neftchi Baku (loan)	2015–16	Azerbaijan Premier League	13	0	1	1	2	0	—		16	1
Kapaz	2017–18	Azerbaijan Premier League	6	0	1	0	—		—		7	0
Career total			99	20	4	2	2	0	-	-	105	22

=== International ===
Azerbaijan national team
Year	Apps	Goals
2015	3	0
Total	3	0

Statistics accurate as of match played 3 September 2015
