= Ilham Yadullayev =

Azerbaijani footballer and manager (born 1975)

Personal information
- Full name: Ilham Yadullayev
- Date of birth: 17 September 1975 (age 51)
- Place of birth: Azerbaijan SSR, Soviet Union
- Height: 1.87 m (6 ft 2 in)
- Position: Defender

Senior career*
Years	Team	Apps	(Gls)
1995–2001	Neftçi Bakı	22	(3)
2001–2002	Shamkir		
2002	Sanat Naft Abadan F.C.		
2003	Volyn Lutsk	1	(0)
2003–2004	Tavriya Simferopol	10	(0)
2004–2005	Neftçi Bakı		
2005–2006	Kapaz	23	(0)
2006–2010	FK Karvan	51	(0)

International career^{‡}
1998–2004	Azerbaijan	34	(0)

Managerial career
- 2014–2015: Sumgayit
- 2019–2021: Turan
- 2021–2023: Azerbaijan U19
- 2024–2025: Azerbaijan U17
- 2025: MOIK
- 2025–: Azerbaijan U18
- * Club domestic league appearances and goals as of 12 October 2025 ‡ National team caps and goals as of 12 October 2025

Ilham Yadullayev (born 17 September 1975) is an Azerbaijani former football defender, and current head coach of the Azerbaijan U18.

== International career ==
Yadullayev made 35 appearances for the Azerbaijan national football team from 1998 to 2004.

== Managerial career ==
On 19 June 2014 Yadullayev was appointed as manager of Sumgayit on a one-year contract.

Ilham Yadullayev was appointed as the head coach of Azerbaijan's U15 and U16 national teams on March 7, 2023. Later, from 2024 onwards, he served as the head coach of the U17 national team. On February 3, 2025, his contract as the U17 head coach was extended until May 2025.

On June 11, 2025, he was appointed head coach of MOIK. Under his manegment, the team played four matches, losing three and drawing one. Following a 4–1 defeat to Shafa FK on October 2, Yadullayev stepped down as head coach, citing a string of poor results and disciplinary problems within the squad. He stated that the players' unethical behavior toward each other and their disregard for him were the main reasons for his decision.

== National team statistics ==
Azerbaijan national team
Year	Apps	Goals
1998	2	0
1999	6	0
2000	7	0
2001	8	0
2002	6	0
2003	4	0
2004	1	0
Total	34	0
