= Kapital Bank Arena =

Multi-use stadium in Sumgayit, Azerbaijan

Coordinates: 40.6032°N 49.6731°E

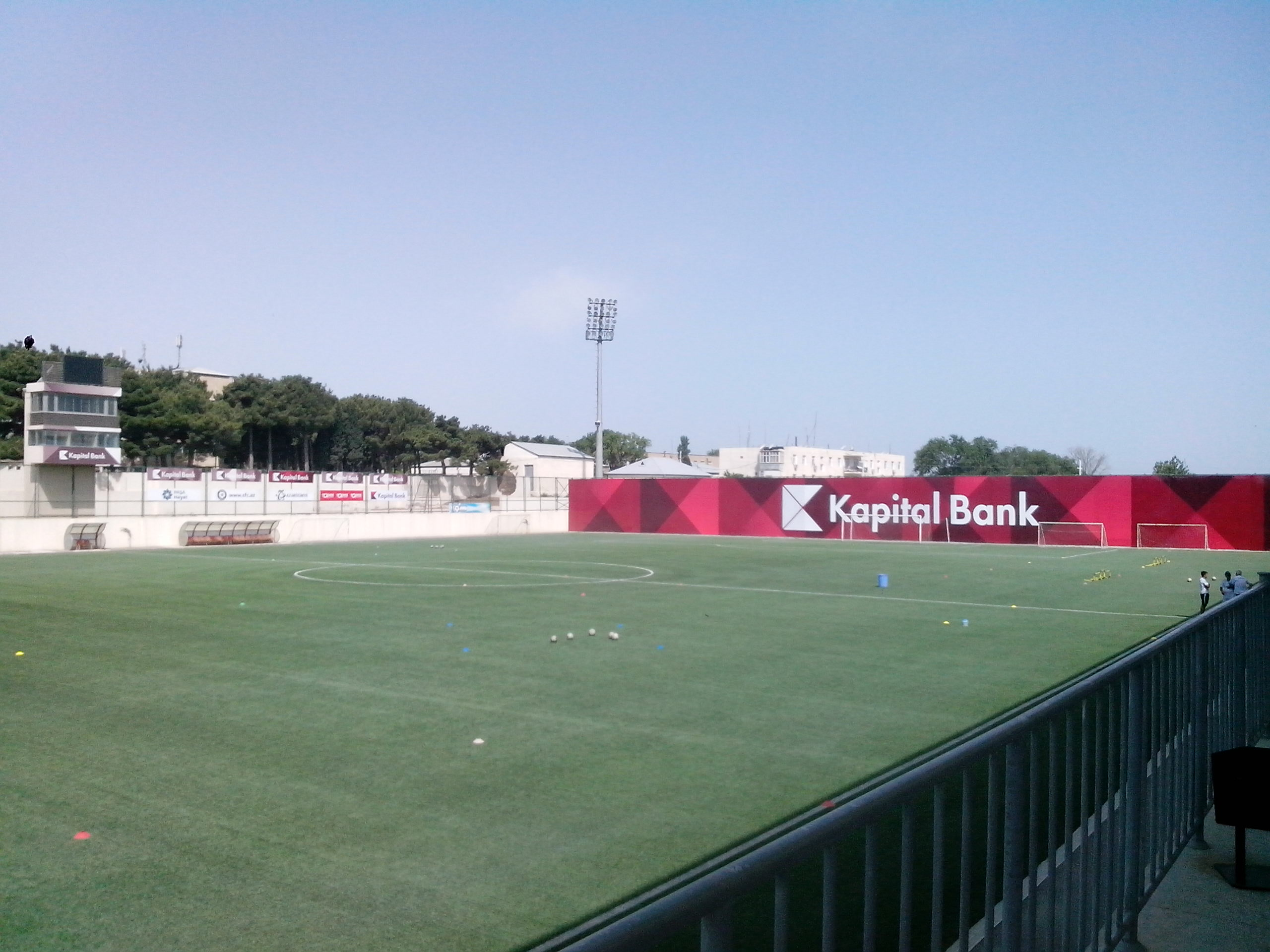
- Interactive map of Kapital Bank Arena
- Address: Sumgayit; Azerbaijan
- Location: Sumgayit, Azerbaijan
- Owner: Sumgayit FK
- Capacity: 1400
- Surface: Artificial

Construction
- Built: 2011
- Opened: 2013

Kapital Bank Arena, built next to Mehdi Huseynzade Stadium (the biggest stadium in Sumqayit, Azerbaijan), is a multi-use stadium, currently used mostly for football matches and is the home to Sumgayit City PFC. It has Kapital Bank in its name due to sponsorship purposes and has a seating capacity of 1400 spectators.

Kapital Bank Arena / Administrative Building Sumqayit Football Club, which has been playing in the Azerbaijan Premier League since the 2011/2012 season, currently plays its home games in "Kapital Bank Arena". The construction of the complex was started in 2011 by the State Oil Company of the Republic of Azerbaijan.
