= Sumgayit City Stadium =

Sports venue in Sumqayit, Azerbaijan

Mehdi Huseynzade Sumgait City Stadium
- UEFA
- Interactive map of Mehdi Huseynzade Sumgait City Stadium
- Full name: Mehdi Hüseynzade adına Sumqayıt Şəhər Stadionu
- Location: Sumgayit, Azerbaijan
- Coordinates: 40°36′04.6″N 49°40′29.0″E
- Capacity: 10,047
- Surface: Grass
- Scoreboard: Yes
- Record attendance: 9,300 (Sumgayit - Qarabağ 1-0, 28 April 2024

Tenant
- Sumgayit FK

Mehdi Huseynzade Sumgait City Stadium (Azerbaijani: Mehdi Hüseynzadə adına Sumqayıt Şəhər Stadionu) is a stadium in Sumqayit, Azerbaijan. It has a capacity of 10,047, and it is the new home of Sumgayit FK of the Azerbaijan Premier League. It is planned to open in 2023 and will replace the club's current home, Kapital Bank Arena.

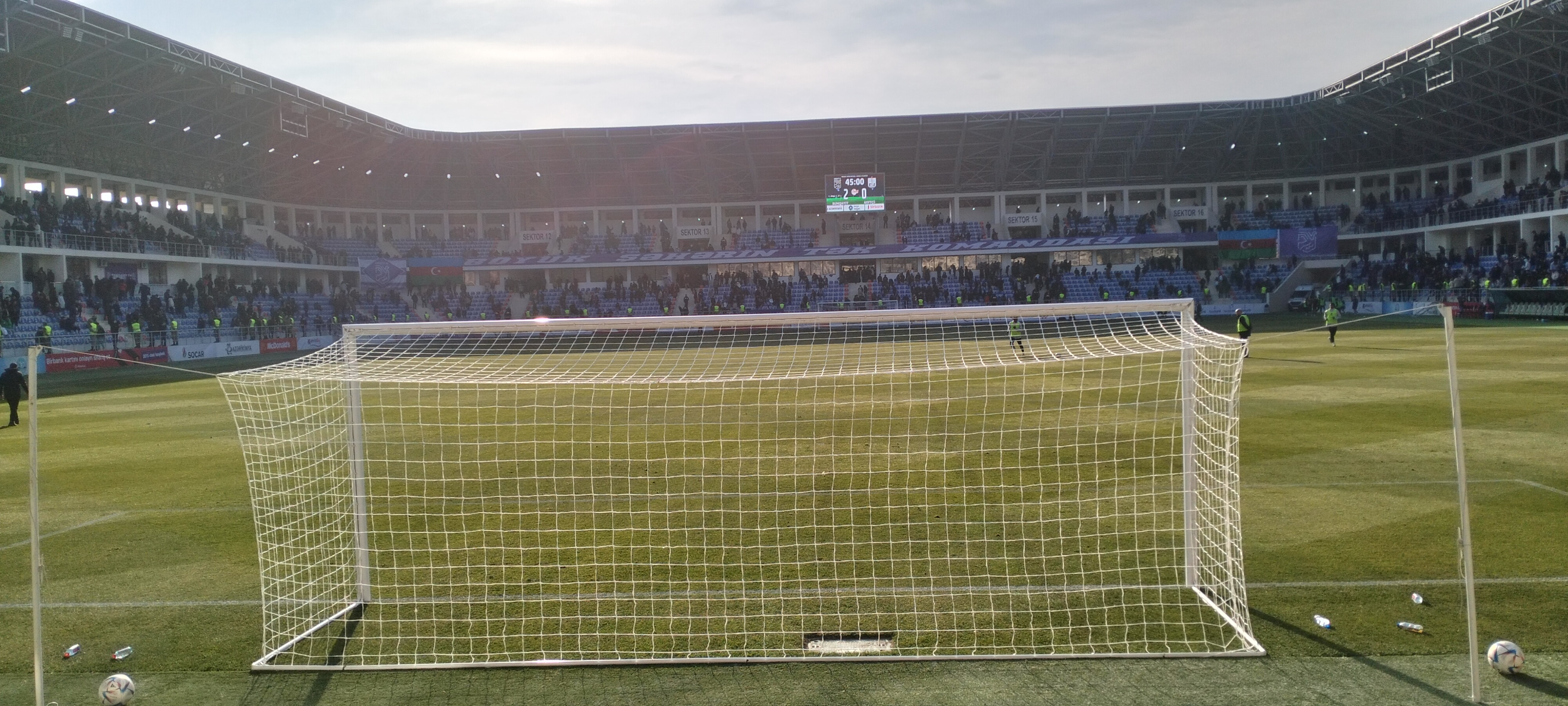
First game in 2024

== Sport events ==
Sumgayit FK~ Neftçi PFK

== Access and transportation ==
To reach Sumgayit Stadium from Baku, the best option is to take the train. Trains run frequently between Baku and Sumgayit, with a journey time of around 47 minutes.
