= Aleksandr Chertoganov =

Ukrainian-born Azerbaijani footballer (born 1980)

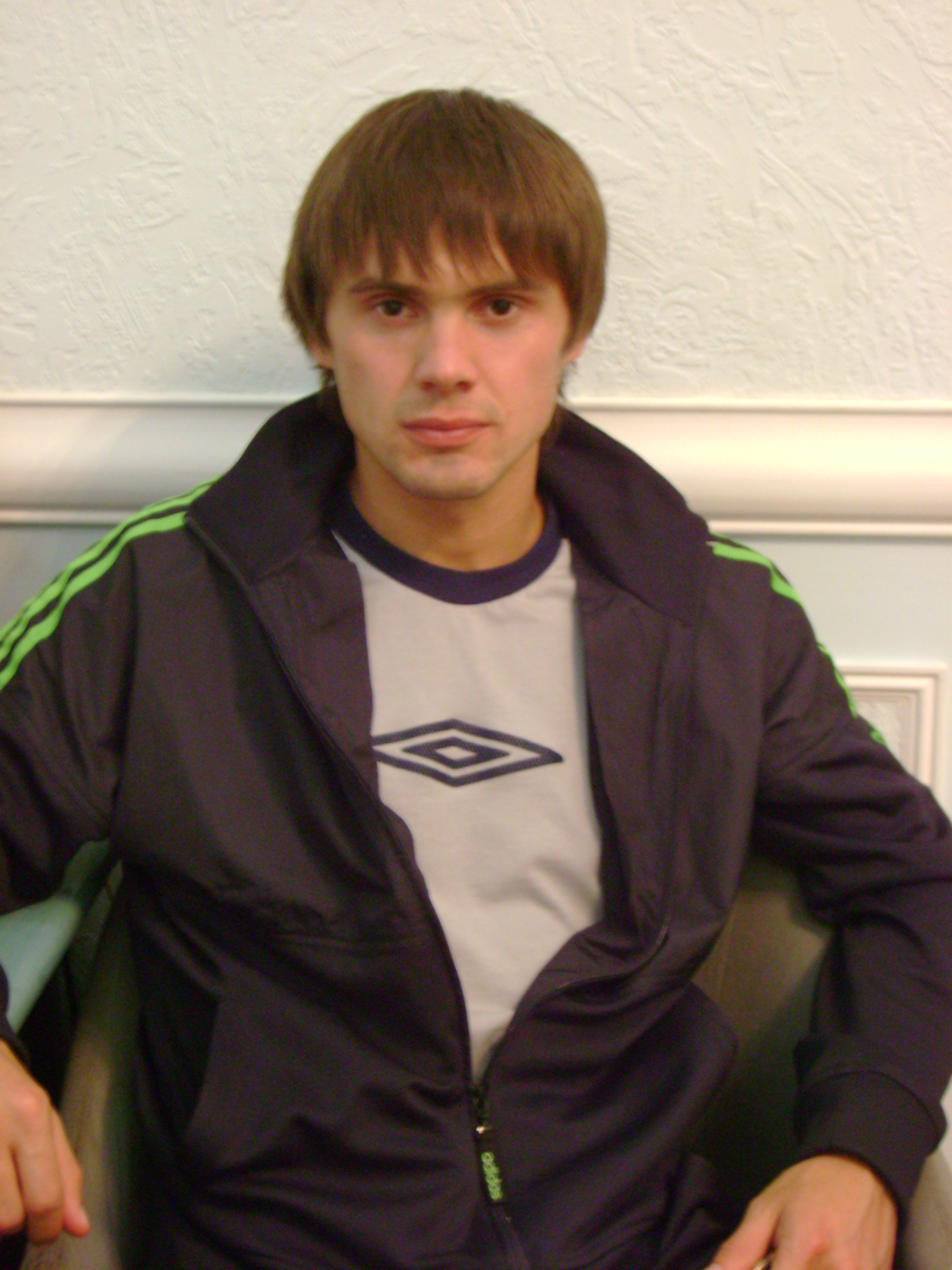

Personal information
- Full name: Oleksandr Chertohanov
- Date of birth: 8 February 1980 (age 46)
- Place of birth: Dnipropetrovsk, Soviet Union
- Height: 1.78 m (5 ft 10 in)
- Position: Midfielder

Senior career*
Years	Team	Apps	(Gls)
2000–2003	Mykolaiv	85	(10)
2003–2004	Spartak Ivano-Frankivsk	14	(1)
2004–2005	Baku	24	(2)
2005–2009	Neftchi Baku	72	(0)
2009	→ Simurq (loan)	9	(0)
2009–2011	Inter Baku	55	(1)
2011–2013	Gabala	49	(3)
2013–2016	Sumgayit	85	(1)

International career^{‡}
2006–2013	Azerbaijan	52	(0)
- * Club domestic league appearances and goals as of 10 January 2019 ‡ National team caps and goals as of 20 October 2015

Aleksandr Chertoganov (Azerbaijani: Aleksandr Çertoqanov; Ukrainian: Олександр Чертоганов; born 8 February 1980) is a retired Ukrainian-born Azerbaijani footballer. Internationally, he played for Azerbaijan.

== Career ==
=== Club ===
Chertoganov signed for Gabala in the summer of 2011 from Inter Baku. In May 2013, Chertoganov parted ways with Gabala. Chertoganov went on to sign for fellow Azerbaijan Premier League side Sumgayit. In January 2014, Chertoganov announced his retirement follow a series of back problems, but changed his mind, seeing out the season before signing a new one-year contract with Sumgayit.

== Career statistics ==
=== Club ===
As of match played 7 May 2016

Club performance			League		Cup		Continental		Total	
Season	Club	League	Apps	Goals	Apps	Goals	Apps	Goals	Apps	Goals
Azerbaijan			League		Azerbaijan Cup		Europe		Total	
2004–05	FK Baku	Azerbaijan Premier League	24	2			—		24	2
2005–06	Neftchi Baku	Azerbaijan Premier League	25	0			—		25	0
2006–07	Neftchi Baku	Azerbaijan Premier League	19	0			—		19	0
2007–08	Neftchi Baku	Azerbaijan Premier League	22	0			—		22	0
2008–09	Neftchi Baku	Azerbaijan Premier League	6	0			—		6	0
2008–09	Simurq Zaqatala (loan)	Azerbaijan Premier League	9	0			—		9	0
2009–10	Inter Baku	Azerbaijan Premier League	25	0	3	0	—		25	0
2010–11	Inter Baku	Azerbaijan Premier League	30	1	6	0	2	0	32	1
2011–12	Gabala	Azerbaijan Premier League	28	2	3	0	—		31	2
2012–13	Gabala	Azerbaijan Premier League	21	1	0	0	—		21	1
2013–14	Sumgayit	Azerbaijan Premier League	31	0	1	0	—		32	0
2014–15	Sumgayit	Azerbaijan Premier League	30	1	1	0	—		31	0
2015–16	Sumgayit	Azerbaijan Premier League	24	0	3	0	—		27	0
Total	Azerbaijan		294	7	17	0	2	0	313	7
Career total			294	7	17	0	2	0	313	7

=== International ===
Azerbaijan
Year	Apps	Goals
2006	4	0
2007	11	0
2008	7	0
2009	9	0
2010	7	0
2011	7	0
2012	7	0
Total	52	0

Statistics accurate as of match played 16 October 2012

== Honours ==
FK Baku

- Azerbaijan Cup (1): 2004–05

Inter Baku

- Azerbaijan Premier League (1): 2009–10
