= Uğur Pamuk =

Azerbaijani footballer (born 1989)

Personal information
- Date of birth: 26 June 1989 (age 37)
- Place of birth: Bielefeld, West Germany
- Height: 1.73 m (5 ft 8 in)
- Positions: Midfielder; striker

Team information
- Current team: SC Hicret

Youth career
- Arminia Bielefeld

Senior career*
Years	Team	Apps	(Gls)
2007–2008	Arminia Bielefeld		
2008–2011	TuS Dornberg		
2012–2013	Sumgayit	28	(3)
2013–2014	Khazar Lankaran	13	(1)
2014	→ Sumgayit	13	(2)
2015–2016	Sumgayit	37	(3)
2016–2018	Manisaspor	18	(2)
2018–2019	VfB Fichte		
2019	TS Bielefeld		
2020–	SC Hicret		

International career^{‡}
2012–	Azerbaijan	1	(0)
- * Club domestic league appearances and goals as of 24 May 2019 ‡ National team caps and goals as of 4 June 2013

Uğur Pamuk (born 26 June 1989) is an Azerbaijani international footballer who plays as a midfielder and striker for German club SC Hicret Bielefeld. He is of Turkish descent.

== Career ==
Pamuk moved to Khazar Lenkaran from fellow Azerbaijan Premier League side Sumgayit during the 2013 winter transfer window.

On 1 July 2016, Pamuk signed a two-year contract with Manisaspor.

== International career ==
Pamuk received his first call to the Azerbaijan national team in May 2012, when he was selected for a training camp by national coach Berti Vogts. He earned his first cap later that month against Andorra, replacing Vugar Nadyrov for the final 18 minutes of a 0–0 draw. He was added to the squad for Azerbaijan's World Cup qualifier against Northern Ireland in November 2012, but remained on the bench in the match.

== Career statistics ==
As of 25 February 2015

Club statistics
Season	Club	League	League		Cup		Europe		Other		Total	
Season	Club	League	App	Goals	App	Goals	App	Goals	App	Goals	App	Goals
Azerbaijan			League		Azerbaijan Cup		Europe		Supercup		Total	
2011–12	Sumgayit	Azerbaijan Premier League	14	2	0	0	-		-		14	2
2012–13	Sumgayit	Azerbaijan Premier League	14	1	0	0	-		-		14	1
2012–13	Khazar Lankaran	Azerbaijan Premier League	10	1	5	1	-		-		15	1
2013–14	Khazar Lankaran	Azerbaijan Premier League	3	0	0	0	1	0	0	0	4	0
2013–14	Sumgayit (loan)	Azerbaijan Premier League	13	2	0	0	-		-		13	2
2014–15	Khazar Lankaran	Azerbaijan Premier League	3	0	0	0	1	0	0	0	4	0
2014–15	Sumgayit	Azerbaijan Premier League	1	0	0	0	-		-		1	0
Total			55	6	5	1	1	0	0	0	61	7
