= Pardis Fardjad-Azad =

Iranian-German footballer (born 1988)

Personal information
- Date of birth: 12 April 1988 (age 38)
- Place of birth: East Berlin, East Germany
- Position: Forward

Team information
- Current team: Tasmania Berlin (head coach); FC Amed (player)
- Number: 9

Youth career
- 2000–2007: Hertha 03 Zehlendorf

Senior career*
Years	Team	Apps	(Gls)
2007–2009	Carl Zeiss Jena II	51	(10)
2008	Carl Zeiss Jena	1	(0)
2009–2010	VFC Plauen	20	(3)
2010–2012	Berliner AK	36	(14)
2012–2016	Sumgayit	81	(17)
2016–2018	Keşla	48	(4)
2018–2019	Zira	14	(2)
2019–2021	Viktoria Berlin	23	(8)
2022	Berliner AK 07	5	(2)
2022–2023	CFC Hertha 06	22	(4)
2024–	FC Amed	14	(16)

International career^{‡}
2013–2018	Azerbaijan	6	(0)

Managerial career
- 2024–: Tasmania Berlin
- * Club domestic league appearances and goals as of 20:22, 26 November 2024 (UTC) ‡ National team caps and goals as of 23:55, 15 May 2018 (UTC)

Pardis Fardjad-Azad (Azerbaijani: Pərdis Fərcad-Azad, Persian: پردیس فرجاد آزاد; born 12 April 1988) is a professional football manager and player who manages NOFV-Oberliga club Tasmania Berlin, and plays as a forward for Bezirksliga Berlin club FC Amed. A former Azerbaijan international, he was born in Germany and of Iranian descent.

== Club career ==
Fardjad-Azad began his career at FC Hertha 03 Zehlendorf and moved in summer 2007 from the A youth team of his club to FC Carl Zeiss Jena. After two years with FC Carl Zeiss Jena, he left on 7 July 2009 and signed a one-year contract for VFC Plauen.

On 28 January 2015, Fardjad-Azad signed a new 18-month contract with Sumgayit FK, having been without a club for six months recovering from a knee injury.

On 20 July 2019, Fardjad-Azad signed with FC Viktoria 1889 Berlin. In January 2022, he joined Berliner AK, leaving the club six months later. Shortly afterward, he signed with CFC Hertha 06. In January 2024, Fardjad-Azad joined the coaching staff of NOFV-Oberliga club Tasmania Berlin and began playing for Bezirksliga Berlin side FC Amed.

== International career ==
Fardjad-Azad made his international debut for Azerbaijan in 2013, making his debut against Luxembourg on 22 March 2013.

== Coaching career ==
In June 2024, Fardjad-Azad was appointed head coach of Tasmania Berlin in the NOFV-Oberliga, having previously served as the team's assistant coach. He continued in this role while playing for FC Amed.

== Personal life ==
Fardjad-Azad is of Iranian background.

== Career statistics ==
As of match played 4 June 2019

Appearances and goals by club, season and competition
Club	Division	Season	League		Cup		Continental		Other		Total	
Club	Division	Season	Apps	Goals	Apps	Goals	Apps	Goals	Apps	Goals	Apps	Goals
Carl Zeiss Jena II	2007–08	NOFV-Oberliga Süd	28	6	1	1	—		—		29	7
Carl Zeiss Jena II	2008–09	NOFV-Oberliga Süd	23	4	0	0	—		—		23	4
Carl Zeiss Jena II	Total		51	10	1	1	0	0	0	0	52	11
Carl Zeiss Jena	2007–08	2. Bundesliga	1	0	0	0	—		—		1	0
Plauen	2009–10	Regionalliga Nord	20	3	0	0	—		—		20	3
Berliner AK 07	2010–11	NOFV-Oberliga Nord	22	10	1	0	—		—		23	10
Berliner AK 07	2011–12	Regionalliga Nord	14	4	0	0	—		—		14	4
Berliner AK 07	Total		36	14	1	0	0	0	0	0	37	14
Sumgayit	2012–13	Azerbaijan Premier League	20	5	0	0	—		3	4	23	9
Sumgayit	2013–14	Azerbaijan Premier League	24	6	0	0	—		—		24	6
Sumgayit	2014–15	Azerbaijan Premier League	12	2	0	0	—		—		12	2
Sumgayit	2015–16	Azerbaijan Premier League	25	4	0	0	—		—		25	4
Sumgayit	Total		81	17	0	0	0	0	3	4	84	21
Keşla	2016–17	Azerbaijan Premier League	23	0	0	0	—		—		23	0
Keşla	2017–18	Azerbaijan Premier League	25	4	0	0	4	1	—		29	5
Keşla	Total		48	4	0	0	4	1	0	0	52	5
Zira	2018–19	Azerbaijan Premier League	14	2	4	2	—		—		18	4
Career total			251	50	6	3	4	1	3	4	264	58
