= Vurğun Hüseynov =

Azerbaijani footballer (born 1988)

Vurgun Huseynov
Personal information
- Full name: Vurğun Tofig oglu Huseynov
- Date of birth: 25 April 1988 (age 38)
- Place of birth: Baku, Azerbaijan SSR, Soviet Union
- Height: 1.82 m (5 ft 11 1/2 in)
- Position: Defender

Senior career*
Years	Team	Apps	(Gls)
2005–2008	Turan Tovuz	51	(1)
2008–2010	Gabala	37	(3)
2010–2011	Turan Tovuz	31	(2)
2011–2013	Gabala	28	(1)
2013–2023	Sumgayit	216	(3)
2023–2024	Kapaz	6	(0)
Total		369	(10)

International career^{‡}
2010–2023	Azerbaijan	15	(1)
- * Club domestic league appearances and goals as of 15 September 2024 ‡ National team caps and goals as of 4 May 2023

Vurgun Huseynov (Azerbaijani: Vurğun Hüseynov; born 25 April 1988) is an Azerbaijani former professional footballer.

== Career ==
In the summer of 2013, Huseynov left Gabala and signed for Sumgayit.

On 19 June 2023 Hüseynov signed a one-year contract with Kapaz. In July 2024, the club extended his contract for another year. On 13 September 2024 Hüseynov's contract with Kapaz was mutually terminated, and he left the club.

After leaving the club, he ended his career as a footballer. It has been reported that Hüseynov will now work as a coach at Sumgayit.

== Career statistics ==
As of 15 September 2024

Club			League		Cup		Continental		Total	
Club	Season	League	Apps	Goals	Apps	Goals	Apps	Goals	Apps	Goals
Turan Tovuz	2005–06	Azerbaijan Premier League	7	0			—		7	0
Turan Tovuz	2006–07	Azerbaijan Premier League	6	0			—		6	0
Turan Tovuz	2007–08	Azerbaijan Premier League	25	1			—		25	1
Gabala	2008–09	Azerbaijan Premier League	10	0			—		10	0
Gabala	2009–10	Azerbaijan Premier League	27	3			—		27	3
Turan Tovuz	2010–11	Azerbaijan Premier League	31	2	2	0	—		33	2
Gabala	2011–12	Azerbaijan Premier League	21	1	1	0	—		22	1
Gabala	2012–13	Azerbaijan Premier League	7	0	0	0	—		7	0
Sumgayit	2013–14	Azerbaijan Premier League	22	0	0	0	—		22	0
Sumgayit	2014–15	Azerbaijan Premier League	30	0	1	0	—		31	0
Sumgayit	2015–16	Azerbaijan Premier League	33	0	1	0	—		34	0
Sumgayit	2016–17	Azerbaijan Premier League	27	0	2	0	—		29	0
Sumgayit	2017–18	Azerbaijan Premier League	20	1	2	0	—		22	1
Sumgayit	2018–19	Azerbaijan Premier League	21	0	4	0	—		25	0
Sumgayit	2019–20	Azerbaijan Premier League	11	0	2	0	—		13	0
Sumgayit	2020–21	Azerbaijan Premier League	18	0	2	0	1	0	21	0
Sumgayit	2021–22	Azerbaijan Premier League	9	1	—		1	0	10	1
Sumgayit	2022–23	Azerbaijan Premier League	25	1	1	0	—		26	1
Kapaz	2023–24	Azerbaijan Premier League	6	0	1	0	—		7	0
Kapaz	2024–25	Azerbaijan Premier League	0	0	—		—		0	0
Career total			356	10	19	0	2	0	377	10
