= Sumgayit FK =

Sumqayıt
- Full name: Sumqayıt Futbol Klubu
- Nickname: Kimyaçılar (The Chemists)
- Founded: 2010; 16 years ago
- Ground: Sumgayit City Stadium
- Capacity: 9,502
- President: Riad Rafiyev
- Manager: Filipe Cândido
- League: Azerbaijan Premier League
- 2025–26: 7th of 12
- Website: sfc.az
Home colours	Away colours

Sumqayıt FK (Azerbaijani: "Sumqayıt" futbol klubu, pronounced [sumɡɑˈjɯt]) is an Azerbaijani professional football club based in Sumgait, that plays in the Azerbaijan Premier League, the top tier of football in the country.

== History ==
The club was founded in 2010 as Sumqayıt FK. In May 2011, the team secured their promotion to the Azerbaijan Premier League after getting a wildcard place instead of defunct Absheron. After securing promotion to the Premier League, the club based most of their squad on players from Azerbaijan's U-19 and U-17 players. In January 2012, the club announced that its old name was being restored.

During 2012–13 season, Sumgayit narrowly avoided relegation to the First Division by finishing 10th in the league.

In the 2017–18 season, they were the only team in the league consisting solely of Azerbaijani players.

On 15 January 2019, Sumgayit announced they had signed a cooperation with Tractor Sazi.

=== Domestic history ===
Season	League									Azerbaijan Cup	Top goalscorer		Kit Manufacturer	Sponsor
Season	Div.	Pos.	Pl.	W	D	L	GS	GA	P	Azerbaijan Cup	Name	League	Kit Manufacturer	Sponsor
2010–11	2nd	7th	26	13	5	8	34	26	44	Did not enter			Kappa	Azərkimya
2011–12	1st	12th	32	6	6	20	27	52	24	First round	(Azerbaijan) Orkhan Aliyev	5	Kappa	Azərkimya
2012–13	1st	10th	32	9	8	15	31	49	35	Second round	(Azerbaijan) Pardis Fardjad-Azad	9	Umbro	Azərkimya
2013–14	1st	9th	36	5	10	21	27	61	25	Second round	(Azerbaijan) Pardis Fardjad-Azad	6	Umbro	Azərkimya
2014–15	1st	8th	32	7	10	15	32	43	31	Second round	(Azerbaijan) Magomed Kurbanov	13	Umbro	Azərkimya
2015–16	1st	8th	36	9	12	15	41	49	39	Quarter-final	(Azerbaijan) Amil Yunanov	12	Umbro	Azərkimya
2016–17	1st	6th	28	9	8	11	28	35	35	Quarter-final	(Azerbaijan) Mirabdulla Abbasov	8	Joma	Pasha Life
2017–18	1st	5th	28	11	7	10	34	33	40	Semi-final	(Azerbaijan) Amil Yunanov	10	Joma	Pasha Life
2018–19	1st	6th	28	8	5	15	24	42	29	Runners Up	Five Players	3	Joma	Pasha Life
2019–20	1st	5th	20	6	5	9	24	32	23	Semi-final	(Iran) Peyman Babaei	7	Jako	Pasha Life
2020–21	1st	4th	28	10	9	9	30	31	39	Runners Up	(Azerbaijan) Ali Ghorbani	9	Jako	Pasha Life
2021–22	1st	6th	28	5	7	16	22	46	22	Quarter-final	(Azerbaijan) Ali Ghorbani (Azerbaijan) Rahim Sadikhov	5	Jako	Pasha Life
2022–23	1st	7th	36	8	7	21	26	70	31	First round	(Azerbaijan) Vusal Isgandarli	6	Jako	Pasha Life
2023–24	1st	4th	36	15	12	9	37	38	57	Quarterfinal	(Chad) Casimir Ninga	7	Macron	Pasha Life

=== European history ===
As of match played 25 July 2024

Competition	Pld	W	D	L	GF	GA
UEFA Europa League	1	0	0	1	0	2
UEFA Conference League	4	0	2	2	1	4
Total	5	0	2	3	1	6

Season	Competition	Round	Club	Home	Away	Aggregate
2020–21	UEFA Europa League	1QR	(North Macedonia) Shkëndija	0–2	—N/a	—N/a
2021–22	UEFA Europa Conference League	2QR	(Serbia) Čukarički	0–2	0–0	0–2
2024–25	UEFA Conference League	2Q	(Hungary) Fehérvár	1–2	0–0	1–2

Notes

- 1Q: First qualifying round
- 2Q: Second qualifying round
- 3Q: Third qualifying round
- PO: Playoff round
- Group: Group stage

== Crest and colours ==
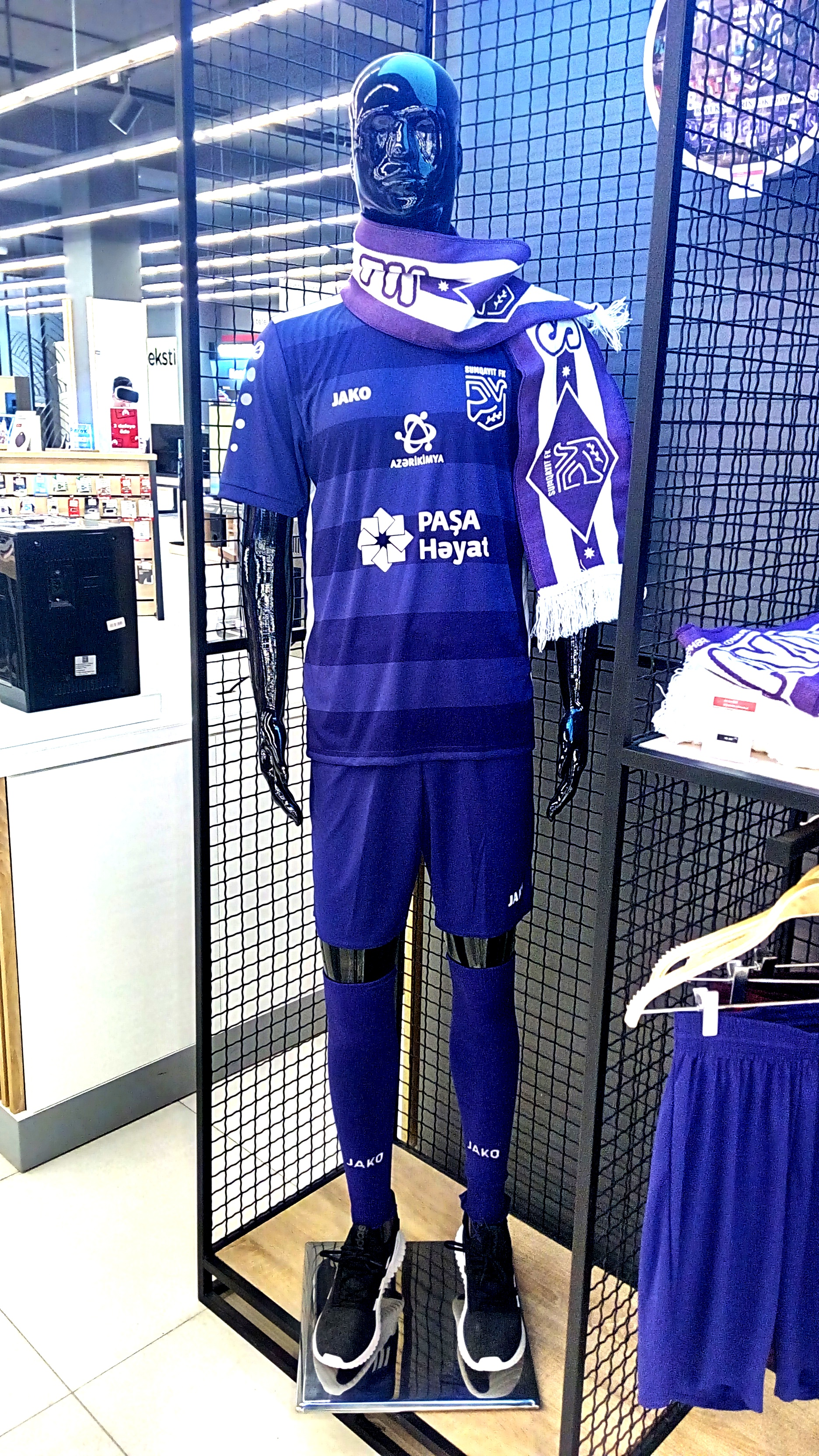
Sumgayit FK uniform for sale

2010–2019

2019–present (Purple)

2019–present (White)

== Stadium ==
Mehdi Huseynzade Stadium is a stadium in the city of Sumqayit, Azerbaijan. It is the fourth largest stadium in Azerbaijan. The capacity of Mehdi Huseynzade Stadium is 9,502.

== Supporters ==
Sumgayit gets most of their support in the Absheron District, particularly the city of Sumgayit. The club also enjoys support from fans scattered all over the city, and the local area in general.

== Players ==
Azerbaijani teams are limited to nine players without Azerbaijani citizenship. The squad list includes only the principal nationality of each player; several non-European players on the squad have dual citizenship with an EU country.

=== Current squad ===
As of 29 July 2026

Note: Flags indicate national team as defined under FIFA eligibility rules; some limited exceptions apply. Players may hold more than one non-FIFA nationality.

No.	Pos.	Nation	Player
1	GK	BRA	Jeimes
3	DF	AZE	Hojjat Haghverdi
4	DF	PAK	Easah Suliman
5	DF	BRA	Renan Santana
7	FW	AZE	Rustam Akhmedzade
8	MF	AZE	Sabuhi Abdullazade
9	FW	BRA	Jeam
10	MF	DOM	Ronaldo Vásquez
11	FW	BFA	Mamady Bangré
12	GK	AZE	Aftandil Arikhov
16	GK	SWE	Marko Johansson
17	DF	AZE	Nihad Ahmedzade
19	MF	ISR	Roi Kahat
20	DF	AZE	Aykhan Süleymanly

No.	Pos.	Nation	Player
21	DF	POR	Thiago Almeida
22	GK	AZE	Khayal Feyzullayev
27	DF	FRA	Imani Barker
29	MF	AZE	Emil Mustafayev
42	MF	BFA	Cedric Badolo
55	MF	BRA	Lucas Black
60	MF	BDI	Trésor Mossi
64	DF	AZE	Kanan Feyziyev
66	MF	AZE	Ruslan Aliyev
71	MF	JPN	Masaki Murata
75	DF	AZE	Nadir Orujov
80	DF	BRA	Keffel
97	FW	AZE	Vüsal Pashayev

For recent transfers, see Transfers summer 2025.

=== Out on loan ===
Note: Flags indicate national team as defined under FIFA eligibility rules; some limited exceptions apply. Players may hold more than one non-FIFA nationality.

No.	Pos.	Nation	Player
—	DF	AZE	Sanan Muradly (at Shamakhi)

=== Reserve team ===
Sumgayit-2 plays in the Azerbaijan First Division from 2018.

== Club officials ==
=== Management ===
Position	Staff
President	(Azerbaijan) Riad Rafiyev
Vice-president	(Azerbaijan) Aydin Khalilov
Head of Supervisory Board	(Azerbaijan) Elnur Mammadli
Director of sport	(Azerbaijan) Faig Haji-Maharramov
Security manager	(Azerbaijan) Elnur İbişov
Director of academy	(Azerbaijan) Adil Shukurov
Press secretary	(Azerbaijan) Zaur Khudiyev

=== Coaching staff ===
Position	Name
Head coach	(Portugal) Filipe Cândido
Assistant coach	(Azerbaijan) Shahin Abdullayev (Azerbaijan) Vurğun Hüseynov (Portugal) Hélder Fonseca
Physical training coach	(Portugal) Diogo Mota
Goalkeeping coach	(Azerbaijan) Emil Babayev
Physiotherapist	(Azerbaijan) Orxan İmanov
Doctor	(Azerbaijan) Tahir İskenderov
Masseur	(Azerbaijan) Revan Allahverdiyev
Manager	(Azerbaijan) Nicat Cavadov
Administrator	(Azerbaijan) Ülvi Bedelov

== Managers ==
=== Statistics ===
Information correct as of match played 7 July 2025. Only competitive matches are counted.

Name	Nat.	From	To	P	W	D	L	GS	GA	%W	Honours	Notes
Bernhard Raab	Germany	19 September 2011	11 June 2013	67	16	14	37	58	101	23.88		
Agil Mammadov	Azerbaijan	12 June 2013	8 October 2015	73	12	21	40	64	114	16.44		
Samir Abbasov	Azerbaijan	8 October 2015	20 May 2018	96	33	24	39	112	130	34.38		
Nazim Suleymanov	Azerbaijan	7 June 2018	12 November 2018	11	3	2	6	11	17	27.27		
Aykhan Abbasov	Azerbaijan	14 November 2018	16 December 2021	96	28	26	42	91	121	29.17		
Aleksey Baga	Belarus	30 December 2021	21 September 2022	23	2	8	13	15	38	8.70		
Samir Abbasov	Azerbaijan	26 September 2022	14 October 2024	19	5	3	11	16	32	26.32		
Saša Ilić	Serbia	7 July 2025										

- Notes:

P – Total of played matches W – Won matches D – Drawn matches L – Lost matches GS – Goal scored GA – Goals against
%W – Percentage of matches won

Nationality is indicated by the corresponding FIFA country code(s).
