= 2018–19 Sabah FK season =

Sabah
2018-19 season
- Manager: Elshad Ahmadov
- Stadium: Alinja Arena
- Premier League: 7th
- Azerbaijan Cup: Quarterfinal vs Gabala
- Top goalscorer: League: Marko Dević (8); All: Marko Dević (8)

The Sabah FK 2018–19 season was Sabah's first Azerbaijan Premier League season, and their second season in existence.

== Squad ==
As of match played 11 May 2018

No.	Name	Nationality	Position	Date of birth (age)	Signed from	Signed in	Contract ends	Apps.	Goals
Goalkeepers
1	Tarlan Ahmadli	(Azerbaijan)	GK	21 November 1994 (age 31)	Khazar Baku	2018		1	0
30	Saša Stamenković	(Serbia)	GK	5 January 1985 (age 41)		2018		27	0
32	Dmytro Bezruk	(Ukraine)	GK	30 March 1996 (age 30)	Chornomorets Odesa	2019		3	0
Defenders
5	Karim Diniyev	(Azerbaijan)	DF	5 September 1993 (age 33)	Sabail	2018		25	0
12	Zahid Mardanov	(Azerbaijan)	DF	9 August 2000 (age 26)		2018		2	0
13	Filip Ivanović	(Serbia)	DF	13 February 1992 (age 34)	Radnik Surdulica	2018		25	1
19	Magsad Isayev	(Azerbaijan)	DF	7 June 1994 (age 32)	Keşla	2018		25	1
21	Novruz Mammadov	(Azerbaijan)	DF	20 March 1990 (age 36)	Khazar Baku	2018		17	0
25	Wanderson	(Brazil)	DF	13 September 1991 (age 35)	Bnei Sakhnin	2018		28	1
87	Elchin Mustafayev	(Azerbaijan)	DF	5 July 2000 (age 26)	Academy	2018		1	0
	Tayyar Mammadov	(Azerbaijan)	DF	10 February 1996 (age 30)	loan from Neftchi Baku	2018	2019		
Midfielders
4	Tarzin Jahangirov	(Azerbaijan)	MF	17 January 1992 (age 34)	Kapaz	2018		17	0
6	Vadim Abdullayev	(Azerbaijan)	MF	17 December 1994 (age 31)	Shuvalan	2018		20	0
7	Rashad Eyyubov	(Azerbaijan)	MF	3 December 1992 (age 33)	Neftchi Baku	2019		13	2
8	Elshan Abdullayev	(Azerbaijan)	MF	5 February 1994 (age 32)	Qarabağ	2018		14	1
10	Javid Imamverdiyev	(Azerbaijan)	MF	1 August 1990 (age 36)	Sumgayit	2018	2021	26	2
15	Éric Ramos	(Paraguay)	MF	12 May 1987 (age 39)	General Díaz	2018		26	0
16	Kanan Həsənov	(Azerbaijan)	MF	9 January 1999 (age 27)	Khazar Lankaran	2019		1	0
17	Tamkin Khalilzade	(Azerbaijan)	MF	6 August 1993 (age 33)	Gabala	2019	2021	8	0
22	Miloš Bosančić	(Serbia)	MF	22 May 1988 (age 38)	Keşla	2018		12	1
33	Eltun Turabov	(Azerbaijan)	MF	18 February 1997 (age 29)	Qarabağ	2018		23	0
45	Tolqar Yaqubov	(Azerbaijan)	MF	15 January 2000 (age 26)		2018		1	0
77	Shakir Seyidov	(Azerbaijan)	MF	31 December 2000 (age 25)	Academy	2018		11	0
88	Elçin Əsədov	(Azerbaijan)	MF	3 August 1999 (age 27)	Neftchi Baku	2018		1	0
91	Joshgun Diniyev	(Azerbaijan)	MF	13 September 1995 (age 31)	Qarabağ	2019	2021	13	0
Forwards
9	Marko Dević	(Ukraine)	FW	27 October 1983 (age 43)	Vaduz	2018		21	8
11	Elgun Nabiyev	(Azerbaijan)	FW	4 January 1996 (age 30)	Zira	2018		27	1
27	Bakhtiyar Soltanov	(Azerbaijan)	FW	21 June 1989 (age 37)	Khazar Baku	2018		15	2
42	Reza Bigdeloo	(Iran)	FW	15 November 2000 (age 25)		2019		2	0
97	Emil Qasımov	(Azerbaijan)	FW	9 April 2000 (age 26)		2018		8	1
Left during the season
2	Ülvi İbazadə	(Azerbaijan)	MF	26 August 1996 (age 30)	Gabala	2018		1	0
3	Elvin Badalov	(Azerbaijan)	DF	14 June 1995 (age 31)	Karabakh Wien	2018		1	0
7	Vitaliy Kvashuk	(Ukraine)	MF	1 April 1993 (age 33)	Neman Grodno	2018		11	1
14	Tural Gurbatov	(Azerbaijan)	FW	1 March 1993 (age 33)	Khazar Baku	2018		4	0
32	Elvin Yunuszade	(Azerbaijan)	DF	22 August 1992 (age 34)	Qarabağ	2018		2	0
39	Alibey Mammadli	(Azerbaijan)	MF			2018		0	0
96	Aydın Bayramov	(Azerbaijan)	GK	18 February 1996 (age 30)	MOIK Baku	2018		0	0

== Transfers ==
=== In ===
Date	Position	Nationality	Name	From	Fee	Ref.
26 June 2018	GK	(Serbia)	Saša Stamenković		Free	
26 June 2018	DF	(Serbia)	Filip Ivanović	Radnik Surdulica	Undisclosed	
26 June 2018	MF	(Croatia)	Josip Balić	Krško	Undisclosed	
1 July 2018	GK	(Azerbaijan)	Tarlan Ahmadli	Khazar Baku	Undisclosed	
12 July 2018	MF	(Azerbaijan)	Javid Imamverdiyev	Sumgayit	Undisclosed	
23 July 2018	MF	(Brazil)	Wanderson	Bnei Sakhnin	Undisclosed	
24 July 2018	MF	(Paraguay)	Éric Ramos	General Díaz	Undisclosed	
5 August 2018	FW	(Ukraine)	Marko Dević	Vaduz	Undisclosed	
	DF	(Azerbaijan)	Elvin Yunuszade	Qarabağ	Undisclosed	
	MF	(Serbia)	Miloš Bosančić	Keşla	Undisclosed	
21 December 2018	MF	(Azerbaijan)	Rashad Eyyubov	Neftchi Baku	Free	
29 December 2018	MF	(Azerbaijan)	Tamkin Khalilzade	Gabala	Undisclosed	
13 January 2019	MF	(Azerbaijan)	Joshgun Diniyev	Qarabağ	Undisclosed	

=== Out ===
Date	Position	Nationality	Name	To	Fee	Ref.
9 January 2019	DF	(Azerbaijan)	Elvin Yunuszade	Sabail	Undisclosed	

=== Released ===
Date	Position	Nationality	Name	Joined	Date
	MF	(Croatia)	Josip Balić	Fastav Zlín	
21 December 2018	GK	(Azerbaijan)	Aydın Bayramov	Sumgayit	6 January 2019
21 December 2018	MF	(Azerbaijan)	Elvin Badalov	Sumgayit	
21 December 2018	DF	(Azerbaijan)	Ulvi İbazade		
21 December 2018	MF	(Azerbaijan)	Alibey Mammadli		
21 December 2018	MF	(Ukraine)	Vitaliy Kvashuk	Gomel	
21 December 2018	FW	(Azerbaijan)	Tural Gurbatov		
15 May 2019	GK	(Azerbaijan)	Tarlan Ahmadli	Gabala	
15 May 2019	DF	(Brazil)	Wanderson	São Caetano	15 January 2020
15 May 2019	DF	(Azerbaijan)	Novruz Mammadov	Kapaz	
15 May 2019	MF	(Azerbaijan)	Tarzin Jahangirov		
15 May 2019	FW	(Azerbaijan)	Bakhtiyar Soltanov	Retired	

=== Trial ===
Date From	Date To	Position	Nationality	Name	Last club	Ref.
January 2019	January 2019	FW	(Angola)	Alexander Christovão	Zagłębie Sosnowiec	

== Friendlies ==
12 January 2019	Sabah (Azerbaijan)	1 – 0	(Turkey) Eskişehirspor	Antalya, Turkey
AZST (UTC+4)	E.Qasımov 68'	Report

16 January 2019	Sabah (Azerbaijan)	2 – 2	(Kazakhstan) Tobol	Antalya, Turkey
AZST (UTC+4)	Eyyubov 39'; Imamverdiyev 53'	Report	D.Zagvostkin; T.Amirgazy

29 January 2019	Sabail (Azerbaijan)	3 – 1	(Hungary) MTK Budapest	Antalya, Turkey
AZST (UTC+4)	Abdullayev 25'; Dević 30'; Imamverdiyev	Report	20'

22 January 2019	Sabah (Azerbaijan)	4 – 4	(Switzerland) Sion U21	Antalya, Turkey
AZST (UTC+4)	Dević (pen.); Abdullayev; Khalilzade; Ivanović	Report	Goal

== Competitions ==
=== Premier League ===
==== Results summary ====
Overall								Home						Away					
Pld	W	D	L	GF	GA	GD	Pts	W	D	L	GF	GA	GD	W	D	L	GF	GA	GD
28	7	6	15	19	40	−21	27	3	3	8	11	24	−13	4	3	7	8	16	−8

Last updated: 11 May 2019.
Source: See Results

==== Results ====
12 August 2018 1	Keşla	0 – 1	Sabah	Baku
21:00 AZT (UTC+4)	Scarlatache (yellow card) 39'; S.Tashkin (yellow card) 64'	Report	Dević 45+2' (pen.); Stamenković (yellow card) 81'	Stadium: ASK Arena; Attendance: 300; Referee: Rahim Həsənov

19 August 2018 2	Sabah	1 – 4	Sumgayit	Masazır
20:30 AZT (UTC+4)	Dević 10' (yellow card) 90+5'; Kvashuk (yellow card) 20'	Report	N.Gurbanov 19'; Mammadov 34' (pen.); S.Aliyev 43'; U.Iskandarov 85'	Stadium: Alinja Arena; Attendance: 500; Referee: Aliyar Ağayev

25 August 2018 3	Zira	0 – 2	Sabah	Baku
20:30 AZT (UTC+4)	Dedov (yellow card) 24'; Qirtimov (yellow card) 73'; Mustafayev (yellow card) 76'; Isgandarli (yellow card) 90'	Report	Dević 2', 30'; Abdullayev (yellow card) 69'; Turabov (yellow card) 78'	Stadium: Dalga Stadium; Attendance: 150; Referee: Orkhan Məmmədov

16 September 2018 4	Sabah	1 – 0	Gabala	Masazır
19:00 AZT (UTC+4)	Dević 23'; Isayev (yellow card) 45+2' (yellow-red card) 75'; K.Diniyev (yellow card) 70'; Stamenković (yellow card) 90+4'	Report	Adeniyi (yellow card) 28'; Aliyev (yellow card) 37'	Stadium: Alinja Arena; Attendance: 1,200; Referee: Rauf Jabbarov

22 September 2018 5	Sabail	0 – 0	Sabah	Baku
18:30 AZT (UTC+4)	Amirguliyev (yellow card) 84'	Report	Ivanović (yellow card) 29'; Imamverdiyev (yellow card) 73'	Stadium: Bayil Arena; Attendance: 1,000; Referee: Ravan Həmzəzadə

29 September 2018 6	Sabah	0 – 2	Qarabağ	Masazır
20:50 AZT (UTC+4)	Ramos (yellow card) 14'	Report	Ozobić (yellow card) 25'; Zoubir (yellow card) 78'; Míchel 82'; Emeghara 89'	Stadium: Alinja Arena; Attendance: 4,500; Referee: Rahim Həsənov

5 October 2018 7	Neftchi Baku	2 – 0	Sabah	Baku
20:15 AZT (UTC+4)	Mahmudov 9' (yellow card) 64'; Bralić (yellow card) 45+1' (yellow-red card) 75'; Paracki 62' (yellow card) 82'	Report	Ramos (yellow card) 57'; Bosančić (yellow card) 88'	Stadium: Bakcell Arena; Attendance: 1,000; Referee: Orkhan Məmmədov

21 October 2018 8	Sumgayit	0 – 1	Sabah	Baku
17:00 AZT (UTC+4)	Hüseynov (red card) 15'; N.Gurbanov (yellow card) 34'; Taghiyev (yellow card) 44'	Report	Bosančić 36' (yellow card) 59'; Nabiyev (yellow card) 56'; Ramos (yellow card) 74'; Dević (yellow card) 84'	Stadium: Dalga Arena; Attendance: 200; Referee: Ingilab Məmmədov

27 October 2018 9	Sabah	2 – 1	Zira	Masazır
17:00 AZT (UTC+4)	Isayev 45+1'; Wanderson (yellow card) 50'; Imamverdiyev 90+2'	Report	I.Muradov (yellow card) 21'; Fardjad-Azad (yellow card) 65'; Mutallimov 73'	Stadium: Alinja Arena; Attendance: 1,000; Referee: Vugar Həsənli

4 November 2018 10	Gabala	2 – 1	Sabah	Qabala
17:00 AZT (UTC+4)	Adeniyi 5'; Joseph-Monrose 15'; G.Aliyev (yellow card) 87'; Gurbanov (yellow card) 89'	Report	B.Soltanov 52'; Bosančić (yellow card) 77'	Stadium: Gabala City Stadium; Attendance: 800; Referee: Ravan Həmzəzadə

10 November 2018 11	Sabah	0 – 4	Sabail	Masazır
17:30 AZT (UTC+4)	Ivanović (yellow card) 63'; Nabiyev (yellow card) 86'	Report	Qurbanov 3'; Koubemba 27'; Cociuc 58', 76'; Martinov (yellow card) 64'; K.Gurbanov (yellow card) 80'; E.Rəhimli (yellow card) 84'	Stadium: Alinja Arena; Attendance: 1,000; Referee: Raad Ahmədov

24 November 2018 12	Qarabağ	1 – 1	Sabah	Baku
19:00 AZT (UTC+4)	Rzeźniczak 45+1' (yellow card) 60'; Abdullayev (yellow card) 45+1'; Ozobić (yellow card) 90+5'	Report	Nabiyev 44'; Wanderson (yellow card) 59'; N.Mammadov (yellow card) 60'; Ramos (yellow card) 81'	Stadium: Tofiq Bahramov Republican Stadium; Attendance: 700; Referee: Ingilab Məmmədov

1 December 2018 13	Sabah	1 – 2	Neftchi Baku	Masazır
16:30 AZT (UTC+4)	N.Mammadov (yellow card) 35'; Ivanović (yellow card) 38'; Wanderson (yellow card) 45+2' (yellow-red card) 70'; Dević (yellow card) 68' (goal) 76' (pen.)	Report	Akhundov (yellow card) 10' (yellow-red card) 33'; A.Krivotsyuk 21'; Dabo (yellow card) 30' (yellow-red card) 84'; Abbasov 39'; Bralić (yellow card) 45+1'; Alaskarov (yellow card) 90+1'	Stadium: Alinja Arena; Attendance: 2,000; Referee: Rahim Həsənov

9 December 2018 14	Sabah	1 – 2	Keşla	Masazır
16:00 AZT (UTC+4)	N.Mammadov (yellow card) 38'; Isayev (yellow card) 57'; Nabiyev (yellow card) 64'; Abdullayev 81'; Ramos (yellow card) 89'	Report	S.Tashkin 34'; Denis (yellow card) 40' (goal) 65'; Mitrović (yellow card) 57'; S.Alkhasov (yellow card) 72'; Aghayev (yellow card) 79'; Yunanov (yellow card) 82'	Stadium: Alinja Arena; Attendance: 300; Referee: Orkhan Məmmədov

2 February 2019 15	Zira	0 – 2	Sabah	Zirə
16:30 AZT (UTC+4)	Qirtimov (yellow card) 44'; B.Hasanalizade (yellow card) 47'; Hamdi (yellow card) 47'; I.Muradov (yellow card) 38'; Mustafayev (red card) 62'	Report	Isayev (yellow card) 18' (yellow-red card) 25'; Ramos (yellow card) 18'; Dević 47' (pen.); Khalilzade (yellow card) 48'; Eyyubov 68' (yellow card) 85'; Imamverdiyev (yellow card) 74'	Stadium: Zira Olympic Sport Complex Stadium; Attendance: 200; Referee: Rauf Jabbarov

9 February 2019 16	Sabah	0 – 1	Gabala	Masazır
16:00 AZST (UTC+4)	Dević (yellow card) 17' (yellow-red card) 45+1'; Eyyubov (yellow card) 29'; Diniyev (yellow card) 47'	Report	R.Aliyev 31'; A.Seydiyev (yellow card) 53'; E.Jamalov (yellow card) 57'	Stadium: Alinja Arena; Attendance: 600; Referee: Səbuhi Bayramov

17 February 2019 17	Sabail	1 – 0	Sabah	Baku
15:00 AZT (UTC+4)	Ramazanov 64'; Martinov (yellow card) 86'; Rybka (yellow card) 90+3'	Report	Khalilzade (yellow card) 41'; Wanderson (yellow card) 76'	Stadium: Bayil Arena; Attendance: 200; Referee: Ravan Həmzəzadə

23 February 2019 18	Sabah	1 – 1	Qarabağ	Masazır
16:30 AZT (UTC+4)	Diniyev (yellow card) 1'; Turabov (yellow card) 7'; Ramos (yellow card) 7' (yellow-red card) 78'; Isayev (yellow card) 24'; Khalilzade (yellow card) 47'; Eyyubov (yellow card) 70'	Report	Reynaldo 19' (yellow card) 34'; Madatov (yellow card) 25'; Huseynov (yellow card) 87'	Stadium: Alinja Arena; Attendance: 1,700; Referee: İnqilab Mammadov

2 March 2019 19	Neftchi Baku	3 – 0	Sabah	Baku
18:30 AZT (UTC+4)	Sansone 9' (yellow card) 11'; Dabo (yellow card) 12' (goal) 79'; Mahmudov 24'; Platellas (yellow card) 34'; Buludov (yellow card) 67'; Mirzabeyov (yellow card) 75' (yellow-red card) 84'; Mustivar (yellow card) 81'	Report	Khalilzade (yellow card) 11'; Eyyubov (yellow card) 25'; N.Mammadov (yellow card) 44'	Stadium: Bakcell Arena; Attendance: 1,000; Referee: Vugar Həsənli

9 March 2019 20	Keşla	3 – 0	Sabah	Baku
16:00 AZT (UTC+4)	Ayité 27', 47'; J.Amirli 67'; N.Quliyev (yellow card) 90+2'	Report	Isayev (yellow card) 55'; Imamverdiyev (yellow card) 61'	Stadium: ASK Arena; Attendance: 250; Referee: Rahim Həsənov

15 March 2019 21	Sabah	1 – 1	Sumgayit	Masazır
16:00 AZT (UTC+4)	Dević (yellow card) 28' (yellow-red card) 29'; Diniyev (yellow card) 43'; Eyyubov 77'; Ramos (yellow card) 82'	Report	E.Babayev (yellow card) 14'; N.Gurbanov (yellow card) 17'; Naghiyev (yellow card) 32'; Mammadov 40'; Hüseynov (yellow card) 45+1'; Yildirim (yellow card) 82'	Stadium: Alinja Arena; Attendance: 1,000; Referee: Orkhan Məmmədov

1 April 2019 22	Gabala	0 – 0	Sabah	Qabala
14:00 AZST (UTC+4)	Stanković (yellow card) 10'; As.Mammadov (yellow card) 40'	Report	K.Diniyev (yellow card) 15' (yellow-red card) 90+1'; Abdullayev (yellow card) 26'; Diniyev (yellow card) 67'	Stadium: Gabala City Stadium; Attendance: 300; Referee: Rauf Jabbarov

7 April 2019 23	Sabah	3 – 1	Sabail	Masazır
17:30 AZT (UTC+4)	Ivanović 32'; Imamverdiyev 66'; Wanderson 69'; Ramos (yellow card) 85'; Khalilzade (yellow card) 87'; Abdullayev (yellow card) 90+3'	Report	Henrique 2'; F.Muradbayli (yellow card) 82'	Stadium: Alinja Arena; Attendance: 600; Referee: Rahim Həsənov

13 April 2019 24	Qarabağ	3 – 0	Sabah	Baku
18:30 AZT (UTC+4)	Ozobić (yellow card) 6' (goal) 65'; Richard 10'; Míchel (yellow card) 22'; Madatov (yellow card) 44' (goal) 77'; Guerrier (yellow card) 90+2'	Report	Isayev (yellow card) 41'; Abdullayev (yellow card) 44'; Nabiyev (yellow card) 62'	Stadium: Tofiq Bahramov Republican Stadium; Attendance: 500; Referee: Ingilab Məmmədov

19 April 2019 24	Sabah	0 – 2	Neftchi Baku	Masazır
18:30 AZT (UTC+4)	Ivanović (yellow card) 22'; N.Mammadov (yellow card) 37' (yellow-red card) 56'; Ramos (yellow card) 61'	Report	Mbodj (yellow card) 20'; Akhundov (yellow card) 27'; Paracki (yellow card) 35'; Mahmudov (yellow card) 48'; Alaskarov 59', 62'	Stadium: Alinja Arena; Attendance: 1,600; Referee: Rovan Rəcəbov

27 April 2019 26	Sabah	1 – 1	Keşla	Masazır
17:00 AZT (UTC+4)	Ramos (yellow card) 31'; Dević 59' (pen.); Bezruk (yellow card) 90+2'; K.Diniyev (yellow card) 90+4'	Report	A.Salahli (yellow card) 24'; Mitrović (yellow card) 25'; S.Əsədov (yellow card) 32'; Guliyev (yellow card) 56'; Ayité 90+4' (yellow card) 90+4'	Stadium: Alinja Arena; Attendance: 500; Referee: Ingilab Məmmədov

5 May 2019 27	Sumgayit	1 – 0	Sabah	Sumqayit
20:00 AZT (UTC+4)	Badalov (yellow card) 36'; Agayev 50'; Isayev (yellow card) 64'; Babayev (yellow card) 65'; Jannatov (yellow card) 89'; M.Khachayev (yellow card) 90+1'	Report	Isayev (yellow card) 38'; Diniyev (yellow card) 51'; Ivanović (yellow card) 77'; Eyyubov (yellow card) 87'	Stadium: Kapital Bank Arena; Attendance: 1,500; Referee: Vugar Həsənli

11 May 2019 28	Sabah	0 – 3	Zira	Masazır
16:00 AZT (UTC+4)	Mardanov (yellow card) 20'; Nabiyev (yellow card) 55'	Report	Kgaswane (yellow card) 12'; Rodríguez 38', 81'; Tigroudja (yellow card) 41'; Scarlatache (yellow card) 50'; Ngalande 69'	Stadium: Alinja Arena; Attendance: 500; Referee: Aliyar Ağayev

==== League table ====
Pos	Team	Pld	W	D	L	GF	GA	GD	Pts	Qualification or relegation
4	Gabala	28	9	9	10	31	33	−2	36	Qualification for the Europa League second qualifying round
5	Zira	28	8	7	13	30	40	−10	31	
6	Sumgayit	28	8	5	15	24	42	−18	29	
7	Sabah	28	7	6	15	20	41	−21	27	
8	Keşla	28	6	5	17	29	45	−16	23	

Source: Soccerway
Rules for classification: 1) Points; 2) Head-to-head points; 3) Head-to-head goal difference; 4) Head-to-head goals scored; 5) Head-to-head away goals scored (only if two teams); 6) Goal difference; 7) Goals scored.

=== Azerbaijan Cup ===
6 December 2018 Second Round	Ağsu	0 – 3	Sabah	Agsu
13:30 AZT (UTC+4)	E.Səmədov (yellow card) 26'; F.Rəhimov (yellow card) 54'	Report	B.Soltanov 6'; Kvashuk 26' (yellow card) 45+1'; Abdullayev (yellow card) 34'; E.Qasımov 76'	Stadium: Agsu City Stadium; Attendance: 300; Referee: Kamal Umudlu

16 December 2018 Quarterfinal 1st leg	Gabala	1 – 0	Sabah	Qabala
14:00 AZT (UTC+4)	Ivanović 45' (o.g.)	Report	Ivanović (yellow card) 59'	Stadium: Gabala City Stadium; Attendance: 150; Referee: Ravan Həmzəzadə

20 December 2018 Quarterfinal 2nd leg	Sabah	0 – 1 (0 – 2 agg.)	Gabala	Masazır
16:00 AZT (UTC+4)	Seyidov (yellow card) 35'; Nabiyev (yellow card) 39'; Abdullayev (yellow card) 45'; Ramos (yellow card) 53' (yellow-red card) 83'; Turabov (yellow card) 67'	Report	Joseph-Monrose (yellow card) 9'; Adeniyi (yellow card) 44' (goal) 80'	Stadium: Alinja Arena; Attendance: 400; Referee: Aliyar Aghayev

== Squad statistics ==
As of match played 11 May 2019

=== Appearances and goals ===
No.	Pos	Nat	Player	Total		Premier League		Azerbaijan Cup	
No.	Pos	Nat	Player	Apps	Goals	Apps	Goals	Apps	Goals
1	GK	(Azerbaijan) AZE	Tarlan Ahmadli	1	0	0	0	1	0
4	MF	(Azerbaijan) AZE	Tarzin Jahangirov	17	0	5+11	0	1	0
5	DF	(Azerbaijan) AZE	Karim Diniyev	25	0	23	0	2	0
6	MF	(Azerbaijan) AZE	Vadim Abdullayev	20	0	9+8	0	2+1	0
7	MF	(Azerbaijan) AZE	Rashad Eyyubov	13	2	13	2	0	0
8	MF	(Azerbaijan) AZE	Elshan Abdullayev	13	1	8+3	1	1+1	0
9	FW	(Ukraine) UKR	Marko Dević	21	8	20+1	8	0	0
10	MF	(Azerbaijan) AZE	Javid Imamverdiyev	26	2	21+3	2	1+1	0
11	FW	(Azerbaijan) AZE	Elgun Nabiyev	27	1	17+8	1	2	0
12	DF	(Azerbaijan) AZE	Zahid Mardanov	2	0	1	0	1	0
13	DF	(Serbia) SRB	Filip Ivanović	25	1	22+2	1	1	0
15	MF	(Paraguay) PAR	Éric Ramos	26	0	24+1	0	1	0
16	MF	(Azerbaijan) AZE	Kanan Həsənov	1	0	0+1	0	0	0
17	MF	(Azerbaijan) AZE	Tamkin Khalilzade	8	0	7+1	0	0	0
19	DF	(Azerbaijan) AZE	Magsad Isayev	25	1	19+5	1	1	0
21	DF	(Azerbaijan) AZE	Novruz Mammadov	17	0	13+3	0	1	0
22	MF	(Serbia) SRB	Miloš Bosančić	12	1	8+2	1	2	0
25	DF	(Brazil) BRA	Wanderson	28	1	21+4	1	3	0
27	FW	(Azerbaijan) AZE	Bakhtiyar Soltanov	15	2	7+6	1	1+1	1
30	GK	(Serbia) SRB	Saša Stamenković	27	0	25	0	2	0
32	GK	(Ukraine) UKR	Dmytro Bezruk	3	0	3	0	0	0
33	MF	(Azerbaijan) AZE	Eltun Turabov	23	0	16+5	0	2	0
42	FW	(Iran) IRI	Reza Bigdeloo	2	0	1+1	0	0	0
45	MF	(Azerbaijan) AZE	Tolqar Yaqubov	1	0	0	0	0+1	0
77	MF	(Azerbaijan) AZE	Shakir Seyidov	11	0	1+7	0	2+1	0
87	DF	(Azerbaijan) AZE	Elchin Mustafayev	1	0	0	0	0+1	0
88	MF	(Azerbaijan) AZE	Elçin Əsədov	1	0	0	0	1	0
91	MF	(Azerbaijan) AZE	Joshgun Diniyev	13	0	12+1	0	0	0
97	FW	(Azerbaijan) AZE	Emil Qasımov	8	1	1+4	0	0+3	1
Players away on loan:
Players who left Sabah during the season:
2	MF	(Azerbaijan) AZE	Ülvi İbazadə	1	0	0	0	1	0
3	DF	(Azerbaijan) AZE	Elvin Badalov	1	0	0	0	1	0
7	MF	(Ukraine) UKR	Vitaliy Kvashuk	11	1	9+1	0	1	1
14	FW	(Azerbaijan) AZE	Tural Gurbatov	4	0	0+3	0	1	0
32	DF	(Azerbaijan) AZE	Elvin Yunuszade	2	0	2	0	0	0

=== Goal scorers ===
Place	Position	Nation	Number	Name	Premier League	Azerbaijan Cup	Total
1	FW	(Ukraine)	9	Marko Dević	8	0	8
2	MF	(Azerbaijan)	7	Rashad Eyyubov	2	0	2
2	MF	(Azerbaijan)	10	Javid Imamverdiyev	2	0	2
2	FW	(Azerbaijan)	27	Bakhtiyar Soltanov	1	1	2
5	MF	(Serbia)	22	Miloš Bosančić	1	0	1
5	DF	(Azerbaijan)	19	Magsad Isayev	1	0	1
5	FW	(Azerbaijan)	11	Elgun Nabiyev	1	0	1
5	MF	(Azerbaijan)	8	Elshan Abdullayev	1	0	1
5	DF	(Serbia)	13	Filip Ivanović	1	0	1
5	DF	(Brazil)	25	Wanderson	1	0	1
5	MF	(Ukraine)	7	Vitaliy Kvashuk	0	1	1
5	FW	(Azerbaijan)	97	Emil Qasımov	0	1	1
5				Own goal	1	0	1
				TOTALS	20	3	23

=== Disciplinary record ===
Number	Nation	Position	Name	Premier League		Azerbaijan Cup		Total	
Number	Nation	Position	Name	Yellow card	Red card	Yellow card	Red card	Yellow card	Red card
5	(Azerbaijan)	DF	Karim Diniyev	4	1	0	0	4	1
6	(Azerbaijan)	MF	Vadim Abdullayev	4	0	2	0	6	0
7	(Azerbaijan)	MF	Rashad Eyyubov	5	0	0	0	5	0
9	(Ukraine)	FW	Marko Dević	7	2	0	0	7	2
10	(Azerbaijan)	MF	Javid Imamverdiyev	3	0	0	0	3	0
11	(Azerbaijan)	FW	Elgun Nabiyev	5	0	1	0	6	0
12	(Azerbaijan)	DF	Zahid Mardanov	1	0	0	0	1	0
13	(Serbia)	DF	Filip Ivanović	5	0	1	0	6	0
15	(Paraguay)	MF	Éric Ramos	12	1	1	1	13	2
17	(Azerbaijan)	MF	Tamkin Khalilzade	5	0	0	0	5	0
19	(Azerbaijan)	DF	Magsad Isayev	9	2	0	0	9	2
21	(Azerbaijan)	DF	Novruz Mammadov	6	1	0	0	6	1
22	(Serbia)	MF	Miloš Bosančić	3	0	0	0	3	0
25	(Brazil)	DF	Wanderson	5	1	0	0	5	1
30	(Serbia)	GK	Saša Stamenković	2	0	0	0	2	0
32	(Ukraine)	GK	Dmytro Bezruk	1	0	0	0	1	0
33	(Azerbaijan)	MF	Eltun Turabov	2	0	1	0	3	0
77	(Azerbaijan)	MF	Shakir Seyidov	0	0	1	0	1	0
91	(Azerbaijan)	MF	Joshgun Diniyev	5	0	0	0	5	0
Players away on loan:
Players who left Sabah during the season:
7	(Ukraine)	MF	Vitaliy Kvashuk	1	0	1	0	2	0
			TOTALS	85	8	8	1	93	9
