= Diniyev =

Diniyev is a surname. Notable people with the surname include:

- Coşqun Diniyev (born 1995), Azerbaijani footballer
- Karim Diniyev (born 1993), Azerbaijani footballer
- Shahin Diniyev (born 1966), Azerbaijani footballer and manager
