= 2019–20 Sabah FK season =

Sabah
2019–20 season
- Manager: Elshad Ahmadov (until 16 September); Igor Ponomaryov (Interim) (16 September - 26 November); Željko Sopić (from 26 November)
- Stadium: Alinja Arena
- Premier League: 6th
- Azerbaijan Cup: Quarterfinal vs Gabala
- Top goalscorer: League: Three Players (3); All: Ulysse Diallo (4)

The Sabah FK 2019–20 season was Sabah's second Azerbaijan Premier League season, and their third season in existence.

== Season events ==
On 16 September, Elshad Ahmadov resigned as manager with Igor Ponomaryov taking over on an interim basis. On 26 November, Sabah announced that Željko Sopić had been appointed manager on an 18-month contract.

On 13 March 2020, the Azerbaijan Premier League was postponed due to the COVID-19 pandemic.

On 19 June 2020, the AFFA announced that the 2019–20 season had been officially ended without the resumption of the remains matches due to the escalating situation of the COVID-19 pandemic in Azerbaijan.

== Squad ==
As of match played 7 March 2020

No.	Name	Nationality	Position	Date of birth (age)	Signed from	Signed in	Contract ends	Apps.	Goals
Goalkeepers
1	Saša Stamenković	(Serbia)	GK	5 January 1985 (aged 35)		2018		46	0
71	Dmytro Bezruk	(Ukraine)	GK	30 March 1996 (aged 24)	Chornomorets Odesa	2019		7	0
98	Oleg Karnaukh	(Ukraine)	GK	15 January 1998 (aged 22)	TSK-Tavria	2019		0	0
Defenders
2	Elçin Mustafayev	(Azerbaijan)	DF	5 July 2000 (aged 19)	Academy	2018		1	0
4	Bahlul Mustafazade	(Azerbaijan)	DF	27 February 1997 (aged 23)	Gabala	2019		20	2
5	Karim Diniyev	(Azerbaijan)	DF	5 September 1993 (aged 26)	Sabail	2018		37	0
13	Filip Ivanović	(Serbia)	DF	13 February 1992 (aged 28)	Radnik Surdulica	2018		42	1
15	Ruslan Abışov	(Azerbaijan)	DF	10 October 1987 (aged 32)	Neftchi Baku	2019		8	0
17	Mahammad Mirzabeyov	(Azerbaijan)	DF	16 November 1990 (aged 29)	Neftchi Baku	2019		19	1
27	Magsad Isayev	(Azerbaijan)	DF	7 June 1994 (aged 26)	Keşla	2018		42	1
38	Arsen Ağcabəyov	(Azerbaijan)	DF	11 September 2000 (aged 19)	Academy	2019		2	0
Midfielders
6	Vadim Abdullayev	(Azerbaijan)	MF	17 December 1994 (aged 25)	Shuvalan	2018		24	0
7	Joshgun Diniyev	(Azerbaijan)	MF	13 September 1995 (aged 24)	Qarabağ	2019	2021	29	1
8	Elshan Abdullayev	(Azerbaijan)	MF	5 February 1994 (aged 26)	Qarabağ	2018		14	1
10	Javid Imamverdiyev	(Azerbaijan)	MF	1 August 1990 (aged 29)	Sumgayit	2018	2021	40	4
11	Sakir Seyidov	(Azerbaijan)	MF	31 December 2000 (aged 19)	Academy	2018		29	2
19	Tamkin Khalilzade	(Azerbaijan)	MF	6 August 1993 (aged 26)	Gabala	2019	2021	28	0
20	Eugeniu Cociuc	(Moldova)	MF	11 May 1993 (aged 27)	Sabail	2020	2021	4	0
30	Mario Marina	(Bosnia and Herzegovina)	MF	3 August 1989 (aged 30)	HNK Gorica	2020	2021	6	1
32	Rashad Eyyubov	(Azerbaijan)	MF	3 December 1992 (aged 27)	Neftchi Baku	2019		24	3
59	Raymond Qodstaym	(Nigeria)	MF	11 May 1999 (aged 21)		2019		1	0
77	Javid Taghiyev	(Azerbaijan)	MF	22 July 1992 (aged 27)	Sumgayit	2019		5	0
	Abbas Aghazade	(Azerbaijan)	MF	10 February 1999 (aged 21)	Gabala	2019		4	0
	Anar Panayev	(Azerbaijan)	MF	16 June 2000 (aged 20)	Anzhi Makhachkala	2019		1	0
Forwards
18	Julio Rodríguez	(Paraguay)	FW	5 December 1990 (aged 29)	Zira	2020	2020	6	0
21	Ulysse Diallo	(Mali)	FW	26 October 1992 (aged 27)	MTK Budapest	2019	2021	16	4
23	Amadou Diallo	(Guinea)	FW	21 June 1994 (aged 25)	Red Star	2019		21	3
26	Ozan Kökçü	(Azerbaijan)	FW	18 August 1998 (aged 21)	Giresunspor	2019	2021	17	1
28	Kévin Koubemba	(Republic of the Congo)	FW	23 March 1993 (aged 27)	Sabail	2019		0	0
42	Reza Bigbelo	(Iran)	FW	15 November 2000 (aged 19)		2019		2	0
97	Emil Qasımov	(Azerbaijan)	FW	9 April 2000 (aged 20)		2018		11	1
99	Ramil Sheydayev	(Azerbaijan)	FW	15 March 1996 (aged 24)	Dynamo Moscow	2020	2020	3	0
Out on loan
	Eltun Turabov	(Azerbaijan)	MF	18 February 1997 (aged 23)	Qarabağ	2018		23	0
	Elgun Nabiyev	(Azerbaijan)	FW	4 January 1996 (aged 24)	Zira	2018		27	1
Left during the season
9	Marko Dević	(Ukraine)	FW	27 October 1983 (aged 36)	Vaduz	2020	2020	24	9
21	Roger Rojas	(Honduras)	FW	9 June 1990 (aged 30)	Alajuelense	2019	2020	13	2
27	Hendrick Ekstein	(South Africa)	MF	1 January 1991 (aged 29)	Kaizer Chiefs	2019		16	3
88	Elchin Asadov	(Azerbaijan)	DF	3 August 1999 (aged 20)	Qarabag	2018		1	0

=== On loan ===
Note: Flags indicate national team as defined under FIFA eligibility rules; some limited exceptions apply. Players may hold more than one non-FIFA nationality.

No. / Pos. / Nation / Player; — / MF / AZE / Eltun Turabov (at KF Bylis Ballsh)	No. / Pos. / Nation / Player; — / FW / AZE / Elgun Nabiyev (at Sumgayit)

== Transfers ==
=== In ===
Date	Position	Nationality	Name	From	Fee	Ref.
31 May 2019	MF	(Azerbaijan)	Javid Taghiyev	Sumgayit	Undisclosed	
7 June 2019	FW	(Republic of the Congo)	Kévin Koubemba	Sabail	Undisclosed	
13 June 2019	DF	(Azerbaijan)	Ruslan Abışov	Neftçi Baku	Undisclosed	
18 June 2019	DF	(Azerbaijan)	Mahammad Mirzabeyov	Neftçi Baku	Undisclosed	
27 June 2019	DF	(Azerbaijan)	Bahlul Mustafazade	Gabala	Undisclosed	
27 June 2019	FW	(Guinea)	Amadou Diallo	Red Star	Undisclosed	
28 June 2019	MF	(South Africa)	Hendrick Ekstein	Kaizer Chiefs	Undisclosed	
10 July 2019	MF	(Azerbaijan)	Abbas Aghazade	Gabala	Undisclosed	
10 July 2019	MF	(Azerbaijan)	Anar Panayev	Anzhi Makhachkala	Undisclosed	
19 July 2019	GK	(Ukraine)	Oleg Karnaukh	TSK-Tavria	Undisclosed	
2 August 2019	FW	(Mali)	Ulysse Diallo	MTK Budapest	Undisclosed	
21 August 2019	FW	(Honduras)	Roger Rojas	Alajuelense	Undisclosed	
23 August 2019	FW	(Azerbaijan)	Ozan Kökçü	Giresunspor	Undisclosed	
29 December 2019	MF	(Bosnia and Herzegovina)	Mario Marina	HNK Gorica	Undisclosed	
16 January 2020	FW	(Ukraine)	Marko Dević	Voždovac	Undisclosed	
28 January 2020	MF	(Moldova)	Eugeniu Cociuc	Sabail	Free	
29 January 2020	FW	(Paraguay)	Julio Rodríguez	Zira	Free	
17 February 2020	FW	(Azerbaijan)	Ramil Sheydayev	Dynamo Moscow	Free	

=== Out ===
Date	Position	Nationality	Name	To	Fee	Ref.
26 June 2019	MF	(Serbia)	Miloš Bosančić	Voždovac	Undisclosed	

=== Loans out ===
Date from	Position	Nationality	Name	To	Date to	Ref.
14 June 2019	MF	(Azerbaijan)	Elgun Nabiyev	Sumgayit	End of Season	
26 July 2019	DF	(Azerbaijan)	Eltun Turabov	Bylis Ballsh	End of Season	

=== Released ===
Date	Position	Nationality	Name	Joined	Date
Summer 2019	GK	(Iran)	Amirhossein Najafi	Shahrdari Bandar Abbas	
Summer 2019	MF	(Paraguay)	Éric Ramos	Independiente	
15 August 2019	FW	(Ukraine)	Marko Dević	Voždovac	19 August 2019
23 December 2019	MF	(South Africa)	Hendrick Ekstein	Sabail	21 January 2020
26 December 2019	FW	(Honduras)	Roger Rojas	Deportes Tolima	
31 December 2019	DF	(Azerbaijan)	Elchin Asadov	Sumgayit	
24 April 2020	FW	(Ukraine)	Marko Dević		
19 June 2020	DF	(Azerbaijan)	Karim Diniyev	Zira	18 July 2020
19 June 2020	DF	(Azerbaijan)	Vadim Abdullayev	Araz-Naxçıvan	July 2022
29 June 2020	DF	(Azerbaijan)	Magsad Isayev	Sabail	19 July 2020
30 June 2020	GK	(Ukraine)	Oleg Karnaukh	FSC Mariupol	22 February 2021
30 June 2020	MF	(Azerbaijan)	Javid Imamverdiyev	Keşla	30 June 2020
30 June 2020	MF	(Nigeria)	Raymond Godstime		
30 June 2020	FW	(Iran)	Reza Bigbelo		

== Friendlies ==
11 January 2020	Sabah (Azerbaijan)	0 – 2	(Hungary) Paks	Belek, Turkey
18:30 AZT (UTC+4)		Report	Goal

15 January 2020	Sabah (Azerbaijan)	0 – 0	(Romania) Academica Clinceni	Belek, Turkey
AZT (UTC+4)		Report

19 January 2020	Sabah (Azerbaijan)	3 – 1	(Kazakhstan) Kaisar	Belek, Turkey
AZT (UTC+4)	Ivanović 57'; Nuriev 83'; Marina 87'	Report	Goal

21 January 2020	Sabah (Azerbaijan)	2 – 2	(Russia) Spartak-2 Moscow	Belek, Turkey
AZT (UTC+4)	Dević 16' (pen.); J.Nuriyev 70'	Report	Goal

9 June 2020	Sabah	0 – 5	Qarabağ	Masazır
AZT (UTC+4)		Report	Emreli 3', 65'; Romero 15'; Ozobić 37'; Kwabena 90'	Stadium: Bank Respublika Arena
Note: Match played behind closed doors.

== Competitions ==
=== Azerbaijan Premier League ===
==== Results summary ====
Overall								Home						Away					
Pld	W	D	L	GF	GA	GD	Pts	W	D	L	GF	GA	GD	W	D	L	GF	GA	GD
20	5	6	9	19	26	−7	21	2	2	4	9	11	−2	3	4	5	10	15	−5

Last updated: 7 March 2020.
Source: See Results

==== Results by round ====
Round	1	2	3	4	5	6	7	8	9	10	11	12	13	14	15	16	17	18	19	20
Ground	A	H	A	H	A	H	A	A	H	A	H	A	A	H	A	H	A	H	A	A
Result	D	L	D	L	L	W	L	D	D	W	L	W	L	L	L	W	W	D	D	L
Position	4	6	7	8	8	7	8	8	7	7	7	6	6	6	6	6	6	6	5	6

Updated to match(es) played on 8 March 2020. Source: See Results
A = Away; H = Home; W = Win; D = Draw; L = Loss

==== Results ====
19 August 2019 1	Neftçi	1 – 1	Sabah	Baku
20:00 AZT (UTC+4)	Mustivar 40'; Petrov (yellow card) 47'; Aliyev (yellow card) 57'; Joseph-Monrose (yellow card) 67'	Report	A.Aghazade (yellow card) 20'; Eyyubov 33'; Khalilzade (yellow card) 54'; Taghiyev (yellow card) 88'; Bezruk (yellow card) 90+4'	Stadium: Bakcell Arena; Attendance: 1,500; Referee: Aliyar Ağayev

25 August 2019 2	Sabah	0 – 1	Keşla	Masazır
18:45 AZT (UTC+4)	U.Diallo (yellow card) 18'; A.Aghazade (yellow card) 61'	Report	Isgandarli 45+1'; Meza (yellow card) 55' (yellow-red card) 74'; Qirtimov (yellow card) 75'; Gurbanov (yellow card) 90'; Namașco (yellow card) 90+4'	Stadium: Bank Respublika Arena; Attendance: 1,500; Referee: Sabuhi Bayramov

31 August 2019 3	Zira	1 – 1	Sabah	Zirə
20:30 AZT (UTC+4)	Bakrač (yellow card) 16'; E.Jamalov (yellow card) 33'; Norde (yellow card) 77' (goal) 88'; Huseynov (yellow card) 85'; Scarlatache (yellow card) 90+4'	Report	A.Diallo 35'; M.Isayev (yellow card) 77'; A.Aghazade (yellow card) 90+5'	Stadium: Zira Olympic Sport Complex Stadium; Attendance: 1,200; Referee: Rovan Rəcəbov

14 September 2019 4	Sabah	0 – 1	Gabala	Masazır
20:00 AZT (UTC+4)	Rojas (yellow card) 25'; Eyyubov (yellow card) 45+3'; Diniyev (yellow card) 64'; M.Isayev (yellow card) 81'	Report	U.Isgandarov (yellow card) 45+3'; R.Huseynov 47'; Ferreiroa (yellow card) 49'; Nazirov (yellow card) 52'; Žunić (yellow card) 77'	Stadium: Bank Respublika Arena; Attendance: 1,000; Referee: Vuqar Həsənli

21 September 2019 5	Sumgayit	1 – 0	Sabah	Sumgayit
17:30 AZT (UTC+4)	Khodzhaniyazov (yellow card) 2'; S.Tashkin 34'; E.Badalov (yellow card) 37'; Jannatov (yellow card) 71'; Sharifi (yellow card) 73' (yellow-red card) 79'	Report	Abışov (yellow card) 24'; U.Diallo (yellow card) 28'; Khalilzade (yellow card) 37'; Ivanović (yellow card) 69'; Mustafazade (yellow card) 79'	Stadium: Kapital Bank Arena; Attendance: 1,000; Referee: Ravan Həmzəzadə

29 September 2019 6	Sabah	3 – 0	Sabail	Masazır
17:30 AZT (UTC+4)	A.Diallo (yellow card) 15'; Diniyev 78'; Imamverdiyev 83'; S.Seyidov 90+6'	Report	Amirguliyev (yellow card) 74'	Stadium: Bank Respublika Arena; Attendance: 300; Referee: Orkhan Mammadov

6 October 2019 7	Qarabağ	2 – 0	Sabah	Baku
20:30 AZT (UTC+4)	Gueye (yellow card) 4' (goal) 16'; Emreli (yellow card) 6'; A.Huseynov 50'; Richard (yellow card) 83'	Report	Diniyev (yellow card) 33'; Mustafazade (red card) 79'; Eyyubov (yellow card) 83'	Stadium: Azersun Arena; Attendance: 1,400; Referee: Vugar Həsənli

19 October 2019 8	Keşla	1 – 1	Sabah	Baku
19:15 AZT (UTC+4)	Isgandarli 16'	Report	Mirzabeyov (yellow card) 42'; Khalilzade (yellow card) 71' (yellow-red card) 90+5'; Ivanović (yellow card) 85' (yellow-red card) 90+3'; Ekstein 90+2'	Stadium: Bayil Arena; Attendance: 500; Referee: Kamal Umudlu

26 October 2019 9	Sabah	2 – 2	Zira	Masazır
18:00 AZT (UTC+4)	A.Diallo 28', 44'; Eyyubov (yellow card) 90+2'	Report	N.Suleymanov 22', 88'; Scarlatache (yellow card) 90+3'	Stadium: Bank Respublika Arena; Attendance: 750; Referee: Elcin Masiyev

3 November 2019 10	Gabala	1 – 2	Sabah	Qabala
17:00 AZT (UTC+4)	Volkovi 43'	Report	Imamverdiyev (yellow card) 5' (goal) 54'; Ekstein 73'; Mirzabeyov (yellow card) 78'; M.Isayev (yellow card) 84'; Stamenković (yellow card) 90+5'	Stadium: Gabala City Stadium; Attendance: 350; Referee: Rahim Hasanov

10 November 2019 11	Sabah	1 – 3	Sumgayit	Masazır
16:30 AZT (UTC+4)	U.Diallo 32'; S.Seyidov (yellow card) 51'; Imamverdiyev (yellow card) 66'; Mustafazade (yellow card) 67'; Khalilzade (yellow card) 70'	Report	E.Jafarguliyev (yellow card) 35'; S.Tashkin (yellow card) 39'; Babaei 56'; S.Ahmadov (yellow card) 61'; Sharifi 76'; Agayev 90+5'	Stadium: Bank Respublika Arena; Attendance: 2,000; Referee: Ingilab Məmmədov

23 November 2019 12	Sabail	1 – 3	Sabah	Baku
15:00 AZT (UTC+4)	Abbasov (yellow card) 26'; E.Rəhimli (yellow card) 27'; Naghiyev (yellow card) 49' (yellow-red card) 86'; M.Isayev 77' (o.g.)	Report	S.Seyidov (yellow card) 45+1'; Stamenković (yellow card) 54'; U.Diallo 88', 90'; Ekstein 90+7'	Stadium: Bayil Arena; Attendance: 500; Referee: Sabuhi Bayramov

2 December 2019 13	Sabah	0 – 1	Qarabağ	Masazır
20:00 AZT (UTC+4)	Ivanović (yellow card) 45+2'	Report	Richard (yellow card) 20'; Zoubir 74'	Stadium: Bank Respublika Arena; Attendance: 3,000; Referee: Aliyar Ağayev

8 December 2019 14	Sabah	0 – 2	Neftçi	Masazır
17:00 AZT (UTC+4)		Report	Platellas (yellow card) 38'; Krivotsyuk 45+2' (yellow card) 77'; Joseph-Monrose 90+2'	Stadium: Bank Respublika Arena; Attendance: 2,000; Referee: Rauf Jabbarov

1 February 2020 15	Zira	2 – 0	Sabah	Zirə
15:00 AZT (UTC+4)	Ampuero (yellow card) 15'; Jamalov (yellow card) 37'; Ramazanov 45+1'; I.Muradov (yellow card) 71'; Gadze 78'	Report	Mustafazade (yellow card) 83'	Stadium: Zira Olympic Sport Complex Stadium; Attendance: 400; Referee: Elcin Məsiyev

7 February 2020 16	Sabah	3 – 2	Gabala	Masazır
19:00 AZT (UTC+4)	Dević 19'; Marina 22'; Khalilzade (yellow card) 31'; E.Shahverdiyev 64' (o.g.); Mustafazade (yellow card) 90'	Report	U.Isgandarov 5'; Mammadov (yellow card) 28'; R.Muradov (yellow card) 38'; Rajsel (yellow card) 85' (goal) 90+2' (pen.)	Stadium: Bank Respublika Arena; Attendance: 400; Referee: Ravan Hamzazada

15 February 2020 17	Sumgayit	1 – 2	Sabah	Sumgayit
17:00 AZT (UTC+4)	Sadykhov (yellow card) 67'; Agayev 90+1'; E.Jafarguliyev (yellow card) 90+3'	Report	S.Seyidov 59'; Kökçü 61'; Marina (yellow card) 74'; Cociuc (yellow card) 81'; Ivanović (yellow card) 90+4'; Stamenković (yellow card) 90+5'	Stadium: Kapital Bank Arena; Attendance: 1,000; Referee: Ingilab Məmmədov

23 February 2020 18	Sabah	0 – 0	Sabail	Masazır
16:00 AZT (UTC+4)	Khalilzade (yellow card) 56'	Report	Essien (yellow card) 11'; Naghiyev (yellow card) 12'; Rahimov (yellow card) 65'	Stadium: Bank Respublika Arena; Attendance: 1,000; Referee: Vugar Həsənli

29 February 2020 19	Qarabağ	0 – 0	Sabah	Baku
18:00 AZT (UTC+4)	Sadygov (yellow card) 90+1'; Garayev (yellow card) 90+5'	Report	Stamenković (yellow card) 43'; Marina (yellow card) 84'	Stadium: Tofiq Bahramov Republican Stadium; Attendance: 300; Referee: Elcin Məsiyev

7 March 2020 20	Neftçi	4 – 0	Sabah	Baku
18:00 AZT (UTC+4)	Jahan 6' (yellow card) 19'; Mahmudov (yellow card) 40'; Stanković (yellow card) 45'; Krivotsyuk 49'; Dabo 62'; Buludov (yellow card) 69'; Abbasov 90+1'	Report	J.Diniyev (yellow card) 43'	Stadium: Eighth Kilometer District Stadium; Attendance: 1,100; Referee: Ravan Həmzəzadə

13 March 2020 21	Sabah	–	Keşla	Masazır
AZT (UTC+4)				Stadium: Bank Respublika Arena
Note: Match postponed on 13 March due to the COVID-19 pandemic.

21 March 2020 22	Gabala	–	Sabah	Qabala
AZT (UTC+4)				Stadium: Gabala City Stadium
Note: Match postponed on 13 March due to the COVID-19 pandemic.

==== League table ====
Pos	Team	Pld	W	D	L	GF	GA	GD	Pts	Qualification or relegation
4	Sumgayit	20	6	5	9	24	32	−8	23	Qualification for the Europa League first qualifying round
5	Zira	20	6	5	9	25	37	−12	23	
6	Sabah	20	5	6	9	19	27	−8	21	
7	Sabail	20	5	5	10	16	30	−14	20	
8	Gabala	20	5	4	11	25	35	−10	19	

Source: Soccerway
Rules for classification: 1) Points; 2) Head-to-head points; 3) Head-to-head goal difference; 4) Head-to-head goals scored; 5) Head-to-head away goals scored (only if two teams); 6) Goal difference; 7) Goals scored.

=== Azerbaijan Cup ===
4 December 2019 First Round	Sabah	5 – 0	Ağsu	Masazır
15:00 AZT (UTC+4)	U.Diallo 29' (pen.); Mirzabeyov 61'; A.Agcabeyov 70'; Rojas 82', 90+3'	Report	V.Ibrahimov (yellow card) 23'; S.Hasanov (yellow card) 29'; D.Mahmudov (yellow card) 30'	Stadium: Bank Respublika Arena; Attendance: 30; Referee: Farid Haciyev

15 December 2019 Quarterfinal 1st leg	Gabala	3 – 0	Sabah	Qabala
15:00 AZT (UTC+4)	Clésio 19', 43'; G.Aliyev (yellow card) 30'; Volkovi (yellow card) 57'; U.Isgandarov 87' (yellow card) 89' (yellow-red card) 90+3'	Report	U.Diallo (yellow card) 16'; A.Diallo (yellow card) 45+1'; K.Diniyev (yellow card) 57'; Diniyev (yellow card) 75'	Stadium: Gabala City Stadium; Attendance: 400; Referee: Ingilab Mammadov

19 December 2019 Quarterfinal 2nd leg	Sabah	2 – 3 (2 – 6 agg.)	Gabala	Masazır
18:00 AZT (UTC+4)	S.Seyidov (yellow card) 38'; Khalilzade (yellow card) 60'; Mustafazade 62', 76'; Diniyev (yellow card) 90+2'	Report	Volkovi 22', 23'; Clésio 64'; R.Muradov (yellow card) 67'; Y.Nabiyev (yellow card) 76'	Stadium: Bank Respublika Arena; Attendance: 700; Referee: Aliyar Ağayev

== Squad statistics ==
As of match played 7 March 2020

=== Appearances and goals ===
No.	Pos	Nat	Player	Total		Premier League		Azerbaijan Cup	
No.	Pos	Nat	Player	Apps	Goals	Apps	Goals	Apps	Goals
1	GK	(Serbia) SRB	Saša Stamenković	19	0	17	0	2	0
4	DF	(Azerbaijan) AZE	Bahlul Mustafazade	20	2	18	0	2	2
5	DF	(Azerbaijan) AZE	Karim Diniyev	12	0	7+2	0	3	0
6	MF	(Azerbaijan) AZE	Vadim Abdullayev	4	0	1+2	0	1	0
7	MF	(Azerbaijan) AZE	Joshgun Diniyev	16	1	11+3	1	2	0
10	MF	(Azerbaijan) AZE	Javid Imamverdiyev	14	2	10+4	2	0	0
11	MF	(Azerbaijan) AZE	Sakir Seyidov	18	2	10+6	2	2	0
13	DF	(Serbia) SRB	Filip Ivanović	17	0	14+1	0	2	0
15	DF	(Azerbaijan) AZE	Ruslan Abışov	8	0	8	0	0	0
17	DF	(Azerbaijan) AZE	Mahammad Mirzabeyov	19	1	16	0	2+1	1
18	FW	(Paraguay) PAR	Julio Rodríguez	6	0	5+1	0	0	0
19	MF	(Azerbaijan) AZE	Tamkin Khalilzade	20	0	14+3	0	1+2	0
20	MF	(Moldova) MDA	Eugeniu Cociuc	4	0	3+1	0	0	0
21	FW	(Mali) MLI	Ulysse Diallo	16	4	9+5	3	2	1
23	FW	(Guinea) GUI	Amadou Diallo	21	3	13+6	3	2	0
26	FW	(Azerbaijan) AZE	Ozan Kökçü	17	1	14+1	1	1+1	0
27	DF	(Azerbaijan) AZE	Magsad Isayev	17	0	14+1	0	2	0
30	MF	(Bosnia and Herzegovina) BIH	Mario Marina	6	1	6	1	0	0
32	MF	(Azerbaijan) AZE	Rashad Eyyubov	11	1	7+4	1	0	0
38	DF	(Azerbaijan) AZE	Arsen Ağcabəyov	2	1	1	0	1	1
59	MF	(Nigeria) NGR	Raymond Qodstaym	1	0	0	0	1	0
71	GK	(Ukraine) UKR	Dmytro Bezruk	4	0	3	0	1	0
77	MF	(Azerbaijan) AZE	Javid Taghiyev	5	0	1+3	0	1	0
87	DF	(Azerbaijan) AZE	Elçin Mustafayev	1	0	0	0	1	0
97	FW	(Azerbaijan) AZE	Emil Qasımov	3	0	0+1	0	0+2	0
99	FW	(Azerbaijan) AZE	Ramil Sheydayev	3	0	0+3	0	0	0
	MF	(Azerbaijan) AZE	Abbas Aghazade	4	0	2+1	0	1	0
	MF	(Russia) RUS	Anar Panaev	1	0	0	0	0+1	0
Players away from Sabah on loan:
Players who left Sabah during the season:
9	FW	(Ukraine) UKR	Marko Dević	3	1	3	1	0	0
21	FW	(Honduras) HON	Roger Rojas	13	2	4+7	0	1+1	2
27	MF	(South Africa) RSA	Hendrick Ekstein	16	3	10+3	3	2+1	0

=== Goal scorers ===
Place	Position	Nation	Number	Name	Premier League	Azerbaijan Cup	Total
1	FW	(Mali)	21	Ulysse Diallo	3	1	4
2	FW	(Guinea)	23	Amadou Diallo	3	0	3
2	MF	(South Africa)	27	Hendrick Ekstein	3	0	3
4	MF	(Azerbaijan)	10	Javid Imamverdiyev	2	0	2
4	MF	(Azerbaijan)	11	Sakir Seyidov	2	0	2
4	FW	(Honduras)	21	Roger Rojas	0	2	2
4	DF	(Azerbaijan)	4	Bahlul Mustafazade	0	2	2
7	MF	(Azerbaijan)	14	Rashad Eyyubov	1	0	1
7	FW	(Azerbaijan)	7	Joshgun Diniyev	1	0	1
7	FW	(Ukraine)	9	Marko Dević	1	0	1
7	MF	(Bosnia and Herzegovina)	30	Mario Marina	1	0	1
7	FW	(Azerbaijan)	26	Ozan Kökçü	1	0	1
7	MF	(Azerbaijan)	17	Mahammad Mirzabeyov	0	1	1
7	DF	(Azerbaijan)	38	Arsen Ağcabəyov	0	1	1
7				Own goal	1	0	1
				TOTALS	19	7	26

=== Clean sheets ===
Place	Position	Nation	Number	Name	Premier League	Azerbaijan Cup	Total
1	GK	(Serbia)	1	Saša Stamenković	3	0	3
2	GK	(Ukraine)	71	Dmytro Bezruk	0	1	1
				TOTALS	3	1	4

=== Disciplinary record ===
Number	Nation	Position	Name	Premier League		Azerbaijan Cup		Total	
Number	Nation	Position	Name	Yellow card	Red card	Yellow card	Red card	Yellow card	Red card
1	(Serbia)	GK	Saša Stamenković	4	0	0	0	4	0
4	(Azerbaijan)	DF	Bahlul Mustafazade	4	1	0	0	4	1
5	(Azerbaijan)	DF	Karim Diniyev	0	0	1	0	1	0
7	(Azerbaijan)	MF	Joshgun Diniyev	3	0	2	0	5	0
10	(Azerbaijan)	MF	Javid Imamverdiyev	2	0	0	0	2	0
11	(Azerbaijan)	MF	Sakir Seyidov	2	0	1	0	3	0
13	(Serbia)	DF	Filip Ivanović	5	1	0	0	5	1
14	(Azerbaijan)	MF	Rashad Eyyubov	3	0	0	0	3	0
15	(Azerbaijan)	DF	Ruslan Abışov	1	0	0	0	1	0
17	(Azerbaijan)	DF	Mahammad Mirzabeyov	2	0	0	0	2	0
19	(Azerbaijan)	MF	Tamkin Khalilzade	7	1	1	0	8	1
20	(Moldova)	MF	Eugeniu Cociuc	1	0	0	0	1	0
21	(Mali)	FW	Ulysse Diallo	2	0	1	0	3	0
22	(Azerbaijan)	DF	Magsad Isayev	3	0	0	0	3	0
23	(Guinea)	FW	Amadou Diallo	1	0	1	0	2	0
30	(Bosnia and Herzegovina)	MF	Mario Marina	2	0	0	0	2	0
71	(Ukraine)	GK	Dmytro Bezruk	1	0	0	0	1	0
77	(Azerbaijan)	MF	Javid Taghiyev	1	0	0	0	1	0
99	(Azerbaijan)	MF	Abbas Aghazade	3	0	0	0	3	0
Players who left Sabah during the season:
21	(Honduras)	FW	Roger Rojas	1	0	0	0	1	0
			TOTALS	48	3	7	0	55	3
