= 2017–18 FK Qarabağ season =

Qarabağ
2017–18 season
- President: Tahir Gözal
- Manager: Gurban Gurbanov
- Stadium: Azersun Arena
- Premier League: 1st
- Azerbaijan Cup: Quarter-finals
- UEFA Champions League: Group stage
- Top goalscorer: League: Mahir Madatov (5); All: Dino Ndlovu (9)
- Highest home attendance: 67,240 vs Roma (27 September 2017)
- Lowest home attendance: 1,400 vs Sumgayit (22 September 2017)
Home colours	Away colours	Third colours

The 2017–18 season was Qarabağ's 25th Azerbaijan Premier League season, of which they were defending champions, and was their tenth season under manager Gurban Gurbanov.

== Season overview ==
=== Transfers ===
Qarabağ announced their first summer signing on 6 June, Abbas Huseynov from Inter Baku, with Ukrainian goalkeeper Anton Kanibolotskiy signing a two-year contract from Shakhtar Donetsk on 24 June. In July, Qarabağ signed Jakub Rzeźniczak from Legia Warsaw and Wilde-Donald Guerrier from Alanyaspor.

Qarabağ finished off their signings for the summer with loan deals for Ramil Sheydayev, Pedro Henrique and Tarik Elyounoussi, on one-year contract from Trabzonspor, PAOK and Olympiacos respectively.

== Squad ==
As of match played 21 May 2018

No.	Name	Nationality	Position	Date of birth (age)	Signed from	Signed in	Contract ends	Apps.	Goals
Goalkeepers
1	Anton Kanibolotskiy	(Ukraine)	GK	16 May 1988 (aged 30)	Shakhtar Donetsk	2017		8	0
12	Shahrudin Mahammadaliyev	(Azerbaijan)	GK	12 June 1994 (aged 23)	Sumgayit	2015		19	0
13	Ibrahim Šehić	(Bosnia and Herzegovina)	GK	2 September 1988 (aged 29)	Mersin İdmanyurdu	2013	2018	180	0
89	Nijat Mehbaliyev	(Azerbaijan)	GK	11 September 2000 (aged 17)	Youth team	2017		0	0
94	Mammad Huseynov	(Azerbaijan)	GK	29 May 1999 (aged 18)	Youth team	2017		0	0
Defenders
5	Maksim Medvedev	(Azerbaijan)	DF	29 September 1989 (aged 28)	Youth team	2006		359+	11+
14	Rashad Sadygov	(Azerbaijan)	DF	16 June 1982 (aged 35)	Eskişehirspor	2011		272	10
21	Arif Dashdemirov	(Azerbaijan)	DF	12 June 1994 (aged 23)	Gabala	2016	2018	21	0
23	Elgun Ulukhanov	(Azerbaijan)	DF	2 April 1997 (aged 21)	Krasnodar	2016		1	0
25	Ansi Agolli	(Albania)	DF	11 October 1982 (aged 35)	Kryvbas Kryvyi Rih	2012		290	4
30	Abbas Huseynov	(Azerbaijan)	DF	13 June 1995 (aged 22)	Inter Baku	2017		13	0
32	Elvin Yunuszade	(Azerbaijan)	DF	22 August 1992 (aged 25)	Neftchi Baku	2015	2018	74	3
33	Eltun Turabov	(Azerbaijan)	DF	18 February 1997 (aged 21)	Youth team	2015		1	0
52	Jakub Rzeźniczak	(Poland)	DF	26 October 1986 (aged 31)	Legia Warsaw	2017		27	0
55	Badavi Guseynov	(Azerbaijan)	DF	11 July 1991 (aged 26)	Anzhi Makhachkala	2012		272	2
Midfielders
2	Gara Garayev	(Azerbaijan)	MF	12 October 1992 (aged 25)	Youth team	2008	2018	280	2
3	Turan Manafov	(Azerbaijan)	MF	19 September 1998 (aged 19)	Youth team	2017		0	0
7	Rahid Amirguliyev	(Azerbaijan)	MF	1 September 1989 (aged 28)	Khazar Lankaran	2015	2018	52	5
8	Míchel	(Spain)	MF	8 November 1985 (aged 32)	Maccabi Haifa	2015		108	21
10	Pedro Henrique	(Brazil)	MF	16 June 1990 (aged 27)	loan from PAOK	2017	2018	26	6
20	Richard Almeida	(Azerbaijan)	MF	20 March 1989 (aged 29)	Santo André	2012	2018	239	49
22	Afran Ismayilov	(Azerbaijan)	MF	8 October 1988 (aged 29)	Inter Baku	2015	2018	218+	30+
27	Elçin Rəhimli	(Azerbaijan)	MF	17 June 1996 (aged 21)	Youth team	2017		0	0
70	Nijat Suleymanov	(Azerbaijan)	MF	15 November 1998 (aged 19)	Youth team	2017		1	0
77	Wilde-Donald Guerrier	(Haiti)	MF	31 March 1989 (aged 29)	Alanyaspor	2017		30	3
91	Joshgun Diniyev	(Azerbaijan)	MF	13 September 1995 (aged 22)	Inter Baku	2015		99	5
98	Ruslan Hacıyev	(Azerbaijan)	MF	20 March 1998 (aged 20)	Youth team	2017		1	0
99	Dani Quintana	(Spain)	MF	8 March 1987 (aged 31)	Al-Ahli	2015		104	28
Forwards
11	Mahir Madatov	(Azerbaijan)	FW	1 July 1997 (aged 20)	Baku	2015		90	23
19	Famil Jamalov	(Azerbaijan)	FW	8 April 1998 (aged 20)	Youth team	2016		0	0
39	Zaur Fərzəliyev	(Azerbaijan)	FW	1 October 1998 (aged 19)	Youth team	2017		1	0
44	Aghabala Ramazanov	(Azerbaijan)	FW	20 January 1993 (aged 25)	Inter Baku	2017	2018	25	0
90	Ramil Sheydayev	(Azerbaijan)	FW	15 March 1996 (aged 22)	loan from Trabzonspor	2017	2018	19	1
away on loan
16	İbrahim Aslanli	(Azerbaijan)	DF	1 December 1996 (aged 21)	Gabala	2016		1	0
88	Elshan Abdullayev	(Azerbaijan)	FW	5 February 1994 (aged 24)	Neftchi Baku	2017		9	1
Left during the season
9	Dino Ndlovu	(South Africa)	FW	15 February 1990 (aged 28)	Anorthosis Famagusta	2016	2018	59	24
18	Tarik Elyounoussi	(Norway)	FW	23 February 1988 (aged 30)	loan from Olympiacos	2017	2018	8	0

=== Out on loan ===
Note: Flags indicate national team as defined under FIFA eligibility rules; some limited exceptions apply. Players may hold more than one non-FIFA nationality.

No. / Pos. / Nation / Player; — / DF / AZE / İbrahim Aslanli (at Zira)	No. / Pos. / Nation / Player; — / FW / AZE / Elshan Abdullayev (at Zira)

== Transfers ==
=== In ===
Date	Position	Nationality	Name	From	Fee	Ref.
6 June 2017	DF	(Azerbaijan)	Abbas Huseynov	Inter Baku	Undisclosed	
24 June 2017	GK	(Ukraine)	Anton Kanibolotskiy	Shakhtar Donetsk	Undisclosed	
6 July 2017	DF	(Poland)	Jakub Rzeźniczak	Legia Warsaw	Undisclosed	
6 July 2017	MF	(Haiti)	Wilde-Donald Guerrier	Alanyaspor	Undisclosed	

=== Loans in ===
Date from	Position	Nationality	Name	From	Date to	Ref.
31 August 2017	FW	(Azerbaijan)	Ramil Sheydayev	Trabzonspor	End of Season	
1 September 2017	MF	(Brazil)	Pedro Henrique	PAOK	End of Season	
1 September 2017	FW	(Norway)	Tarik Elyounoussi	Olympiacos	31 January 2018	

=== Out ===
Date	Position	Nationality	Name	To	Fee	Ref.
5 June 2017	MF	(Azerbaijan)	Vugar Mustafayev	Zira	Undisclosed	
20 June 2017	GK	(Azerbaijan)	Emil Balayev	Sabail	Undisclosed	
1 July 2017	DF	(Azerbaijan)	Azer Salahli	Sumgayit	Undisclosed	
1 July 2017	FW	(Azerbaijan)	Vüqar Nadirov	Sabail	Undisclosed	
7 July 2017	MF	(North Macedonia)	Muarem Muarem	Aktobe	Undisclosed	
10 January 2018	FW	(South Africa)	Dino Ndlovu	Hangzhou Greentown	Undisclosed	

=== Loans out ===
Date from	Position	Nationality	Name	To	Date to	Ref.
30 December 2017	DF	(Azerbaijan)	Ibrahim Aslanli	Zira	End of Season	
30 December 2017	FW	(Azerbaijan)	Elshan Abdullayev	Zira	End of Season	

=== Released ===
Date	Position	Nationality	Name	Joined	Date	Ref
20 May 2017	MF	(Azerbaijan)	Ilgar Gurbanov	Gabala	31 May 2017	
1 June 2017	GK	(Serbia)	Bojan Šaranov	Zemun	1 September 2017	
24 May 2018	GK	(Bosnia and Herzegovina)	Ibrahim Šehić	BB Erzurumspor	5 July 2018	
24 May 2018	DF	(Azerbaijan)	Arif Dashdemirov	Sumgayit	6 August 2018	
24 May 2018	DF	(Azerbaijan)	Elvin Yunuszade	Sabah		
24 May 2018	MF	(Azerbaijan)	Rahid Amirguliyev	Sabail	26 May 2018	
24 May 2018	MF	(Azerbaijan)	Richard Almeida	Astana	4 July 2018	
24 May 2018	MF	(Azerbaijan)	Afran Ismayilov	Sumgayit	25 June 2018	
24 May 2018	FW	(Azerbaijan)	Aghabala Ramazanov	Sabail	26 May 2018	
31 May 2018	GK	(Azerbaijan)	Mammad Huseynov			
31 May 2018	DF	(Azerbaijan)	Eltun Turabov	Sabah		
31 May 2018	DF	(Azerbaijan)	Elgun Ulukhanov			
31 May 2018	MF	(Azerbaijan)	Turan Manafov	Sumgayit		
31 May 2018	MF	(Azerbaijan)	Elchin Rahimli	Sabail		
31 May 2018	FW	(Azerbaijan)	Elshan Abdullayev	Sabah		
31 May 2018	FW	(Azerbaijan)	Zaur Fərzəliyev			
31 May 2018	FW	(Azerbaijan)	Famil Jamalov	Zagatala		

== Friendlies ==
14 June 2017	Qarabağ	9–0	Baku	Baku
AZT (UTC+4)	Ndlovu; Madatov; I.Aslanli; N.Suleymanov	Report		Stadium: Azersun Arena

20 June 2017	Akhmat Grozny (Russia)	1–0	(Azerbaijan) Qarabağ	Austria
AZT (UTC+4)	Ravanelli 88'	Report

24 June 2017	CSKA Sofia (Bulgaria)	5–2	(Azerbaijan) Qarabağ	Austria
AZT (UTC+4)	Karanga 14', 59'; Yunuszade 29' (o.g.); Malinov 33'; Despodov 44'	Report	Ramazanov 54'; Ndlovu 75'

28 June 2017	Dynamo Moscow (Russia)	1–0	(Azerbaijan) Qarabağ	Austria
20:00 AZT (UTC+4)	Panchenko 61'	Report

2 July 2017	Brøndby (Denmark)	5–1	(Azerbaijan) Qarabağ	Austria
20:00 AZT (UTC+4)	Kliment 10' (pen.), 39'; Wilczek 20'; Kalmár 66'; Bruus 73'	Report	Ndlovu 52'

17 January 2018	Qarabağ (Azerbaijan)	2 – 2	(Russia) Kuban Krasnodar	Antalya, Turkey
AZT (UTC+4)	Ismayilov 50'; Farzaliev 68'	Report	Malyarov 53', 60'

20 January 2018	Qarabağ (Azerbaijan)	1 – 1	(Poland) Lechia Gdańsk	Antalya, Turkey
AZT (UTC+4)

25 January 2018	Qarabağ (Azerbaijan)	2 – 3	(Ukraine) Mariupol	Antalya, Turkey
16:00 AZT (UTC+4)

25 January 2018	Qarabağ (Azerbaijan)	0 – 0	(North Macedonia) FK Shkupi	Antalya, Turkey
18:30 AZT (UTC+4)

29 January 2018	Qarabağ (Azerbaijan)	0 – 2	(Bosnia and Herzegovina) Sarajevo	Antalya, Turkey
AZT (UTC+4)		Report

3 February 2018	Qarabağ (Azerbaijan)	1 – 1	(Montenegro) Mladost Podgorica	Antalya, Turkey
AZT (UTC+4)	Pedro Henrique 30'	Report	3'

== Competitions ==
=== Premier League ===
==== Results summary ====
Overall								Home						Away					
Pld	W	D	L	GF	GA	GD	Pts	W	D	L	GF	GA	GD	W	D	L	GF	GA	GD
28	20	5	3	37	13	+24	65	10	3	1	18	4	+14	10	2	2	19	9	+10

Last updated: 21 May 2018.
Source: See Results

==== Results ====
11 August 2017 1	Neftchi Baku	1–3	Qarabağ	Baku
21:00 AZT (UTC+4)	Bargas (yellow card) 44'; Petrov (yellow card) 62'; Amirguliyev 90' (o.g.)	Report	Madatov 15', 40'; Ndlovu 62'	Stadium: Bakcell Arena; Attendance: 4,800; Referee: Aliyar Ağayev

19 August 2017 2	Qarabağ	1–0	Inter Baku	Baku
20:00 AZT (UTC+4)	Dashdemirov (yellow card) 31'; Yunuszade (yellow card) 82'; Ismayilov 89'	Report		Stadium: Azersun Arena; Attendance: 1,600; Referee: Rauf Jabbarov

26 August 2017 3	Qarabağ	2–1	Gabala	Baku
20:30 AZT (UTC+4)	Sadygov (yellow card) 47'; Amirguliyev (yellow card) 52'; Madatov 63'; Míchel 73'; Ndlovu (yellow card) 88'	Report	Malone (yellow card) 51'; Joseph-Monrose 69'; G.Aliyev (yellow card) 83'	Stadium: Azersun Arena; Attendance: 4,200

7 September 2017 4	Sabail	–	Qarabağ	Baku
AZT (UTC+4)				Stadium: Bayil Stadium

17 September 2017 5	Qarabağ	2–0	Kapaz	Baku
18:30 AZT (UTC+4)	Diniyev 34'; Elyounoussi (yellow card) 70'; Quintana 80'	Report	S.Aliyev (yellow card) 38'	Stadium: Tofiq Bahramov Republican Stadium; Attendance: 2,800; Referee: Ravan Həmzəzadə

22 September 2017 6	Qarabağ	4–1	Sumgayit	Baku
19:00 AZT (UTC+4)	Rzeźniczak (yellow card) 35'; Pedro Henrique 55'; Richard 61' (pen.); Madatov 64', 72'; Míchel (yellow card) 77' (yellow-red card) 88'	Report	B.Hasanalizade 8'; Taghiyev (yellow card) 35'; M.Jannatov (yellow card) 55'; K.Najafov (yellow card) 87'	Stadium: Tofiq Bahramov Republican Stadium; Attendance: 1,400; Referee: Orkhan Məmmədov

1 October 2017 7	Qarabağ	0–0	Zira	Baku
18:00 AZT (UTC+4)	Elyounoussi (yellow card) 55'; Ndlovu (yellow card) 89'; Guerrier (yellow card) 90+3'	Report	Nazirov (yellow card) 90+1'	Stadium: Tofiq Bahramov Republican Stadium; Attendance: 2,500; Referee: Rauf Jabbarov

13 October 2017 8	Inter Baku	0–2	Qarabağ	Baku
15:30 AZT (UTC+4)	E.Abdullayev (yellow card) 47'; M.Guliyev (yellow card) 84'	Report	Ndlovu 85', 90+2'	Stadium: Inter Arena; Attendance: 1,070; Referee: Aliyar Ağayev

22 October 2017 9	Gabala	1–0	Qarabağ	Qabala
13:30 AZT (UTC+4)	As.Mammadov 8'; E.Jamalov (yellow card) 74'	Report	Agolli (yellow card) 16'; Sadygov (yellow card) 35'; Rzeźniczak (yellow card) 36'	Stadium: Gabala City Stadium; Attendance: 3,000; Referee: Omar Paşayev

27 October 2017 10	Qarabağ	1–0	Sabail	Baku
19:00 AZT (UTC+4)	Pedro Henrique (yellow card) 15'; Agolli (yellow card) 31' (yellow-red card) 43'; Madatov (yellow card) 80'; Ismayilov 89'	Report	K.Gurbanov (yellow card) 64'; M.Abakarov (yellow card) 89'	Stadium: Azersun Arena; Attendance: 900; Referee: Ravan Həmzəzadə

5 November 2017 11	Kapaz	0–2	Qarabağ	Ganja
15:00 AZT (UTC+4)	T.Rzayev (yellow card) 45'; V.Oseghale (yellow card) 89'	Report	Yunuszade 42'; Míchel 43' (yellow card) 52'	Stadium: Ganja City Stadium; Attendance: 13,300; Referee: Rahim Həsənov

17 November 2017 12	Qarabağ	2–0	Sumgayit	Baku
18:30 AZT (UTC+4)	Šehić (red card) 30'; Richard 41'; Ndlovu 64'	Report	Yunanov (yellow card) 30'; K.Najafov (yellow card) 30'; Hüseynov (yellow card) 45'; V.Beybalayev (yellow card) 63'; B.Hasanalizade (yellow card) 68'	Stadium: Baku Olympic Stadium; Attendance: 2,000; Referee: Ingilab Məmmədov

26 November 2017 13	Zira	2–3	Qarabağ	Zirə
18:00 AZT (UTC+4)	Isgandarli 51'; Gadze 68'; Khalilzade (yellow card) 69'	Report	Richard 22' (yellow card) 67'; Ndlovu 26'; Madatov (yellow card) 48' (goal) 63'; Rzeźniczak (yellow card) 76'; Mahammadaliyev (yellow card) 90+4'	Stadium: Zira Olympic Sport Complex Stadium; Attendance: 1,200; Referee: Fariz Yusifov

1 December 2017 14	Qarabağ	1–0	Neftchi Baku	Baku
18:30 AZT (UTC+4)	Medvedev 25'; Míchel (yellow card) 90+3'	Report		Stadium: Azersun Arena; Attendance: 3,800; Referee: Fariz Yusifov

8 December 2017 4	Sabail	0–2	Qarabağ	Baku
19:00 AZT (UTC+4)	E.Yagublu (yellow card) 38'	Report	Pedro Henrique 57'; Quintana 69'	Stadium: Bayil Stadium; Attendance: 653

10 February 2018 15	Qarabağ	0–0	Gabala	Baku
19:00 AZT (UTC+4)	Diniyev (yellow card) 71'; Rzeźniczak (yellow card) 72'; Amirguliyev (yellow card) 78'	Report	G.Aliyev (yellow card) 17'; Stanković (yellow card) 73'	Stadium: Azersun Arena; Attendance: 1,500; Referee: Ingilab Məmmədov

18 February 2018 16	Sabail	0–1	Qarabağ	Baku
17:30 AZT (UTC+4)	R.Mammadov (yellow card) 14'; T.Tsetskhladze (yellow card) 64'	Report	Madatov 51'	Stadium: Bayil Stadium; Attendance: 500; Referee: Elvin Əsgərov

25 February 2018 17	Qarabağ	1–0	Kapaz	Baku
18:00 AZT (UTC+4)	Madatov 85'; Sheydayev (yellow card) 90+3'	Report	T.Jahangirov (yellow card) 23'; Dário (yellow card) 81'; Dedimar (yellow card) 88'	Stadium: Azersun Arena; Attendance: 1,488; Referee: Orkhan Məmmədov

3 March 2018 18	Sumgayit	1–1	Qarabağ	Sumqayit
18:30 AZT (UTC+4)	Yunanov 49'	Report	Míchel (yellow card) 37'; Henrique 75' (yellow card) 90'; Guerrier (yellow card) 86'	Stadium: Kapital Bank Arena; Attendance: 1,326; Referee: Ravan Həmzəzadə

10 March 2018 19	Qarabağ	2–0	Zira	Baku
19:00 AZT (UTC+4)	Quintana 22'; Yunuszade 35'; Diniyev (yellow card) 69'; Medvedev (yellow card) 77'; Míchel (yellow card) 90+3'	Report	Đurić (yellow card) 56'; Tounkara (yellow card) 65'	Stadium: Azersun Arena; Attendance: 600; Referee: Elvin Asgarov

14 March 2018 20	Neftchi Baku	0–0	Qarabağ	Baku
18:00 AZT (UTC+4)	Mahmudov (yellow card) 89'	Report		Stadium: Bakcell Arena; Attendance: 4,000

1 April 2018 21	Qarabağ	1–1	Keşla	Baku
18:30 AZT (UTC+4)	Sadygov (yellow card) 45+3'; Richard 57'; Diniyev (red card) 60'	Report	S.Alkhasov 34'; F.Bayramov (yellow card) 50'; Meza (red card) 60'; Fardjad-Azad (yellow card) 75'; O.Sadigli (yellow card) 79'	Stadium: Azersun Arena; Attendance: 1,200; Referee: Orkahn Məmmədov

7 April 2018 22	Qarabağ	1–0	Sabail	Baku
17:30 AZT (UTC+4)	Richard 31' (pen.)	Report	N.Novruzov (yellow card) 7'; Maudo (yellow card) 83'	Stadium: Azersun Arena; Attendance: 1,200; Referee: Ramil Diniyev

14 April 2018 23	Kapaz	0–1	Qarabağ	Ganja
16:00 AZT (UTC+4)	Mandzhgaladze (yellow card) 31'; Jalilov (yellow card) 55'; S.Aliyev (yellow card) 76'; I.Sadıqov (yellow card) 80'	Report	Sheydayev 23'; Richard (yellow card) 23'	Stadium: Ganja City Stadium; Attendance: 8,000; Referee: Orkhan Məmmədov

22 April 2018 24	Sumgayit	0–1	Qarabağ	Sumqayit
19:00 AZT (UTC+4)	V.Beybalayev (yellow card) 25'; E.Abdullayev (yellow card) 36'; B.Mustafazade (yellow card) 90+3'	Report	Yunuszade (yellow card) 27'; Quintana 34'; Garayev (yellow card) 55'; Richard (yellow card) 65'	Stadium: Kapital Bank Arena; Attendance: 2,000; Referee: Omar Paşayev

27 April 2018 25	Zira	1–2	Qarabağ	Zirə
19:00 AZT (UTC+4)	Dedov 61'; Naghiyev (yellow card) 82'; Urdinov (yellow card) 82'; V.Igbekoyi (yellow card) 88'	Report	Guerrier (yellow card) 27' (goal) 55'; Richard (yellow card) 71'; Míchel 90+2'	Stadium: Zira Olympic Sport Complex Stadium; Attendance: 750; Referee: Rauf Jabbarov

6 May 2018 26	Qarabağ	0–1	Neftchi Baku	Baku
19:00 AZT (UTC+4)	Míchel (yellow card) 43'	Report	Hajiyev 37'	Stadium: Azersun Arena; Attendance: 3,000; Referee: Aliyar Ağayev

12 May 2018 27	Keşla	3–0	Qarabağ	Baku
17:00 AZT (UTC+4)	Clennon 4' (yellow card) 40'; Fardjad-Azad 8'; S.Alkhasov 16'; N.Stojanovic (yellow card) 51'; A.Mammadli (yellow card) 85'	Report	Guerrier (yellow card) 75'	Stadium: Inter Arena; Attendance: 2,00; Referee: Raad Ahmədov

21 May 2018 28	Gabala	0–1	Qarabağ	Baku
19:00 AZT (UTC+4)	Huseynov (red card) 45+2'; Ozobić (yellow card) 74'; Khalilzade (yellow card) 85'	Report	Ramazanov (yellow card) 15'; Quintana 22' (pen.); Sadygov (yellow card) 50'	Stadium: Azersun Arena; Attendance: 3,000; Referee: Raad Ahmədov
Note: Match moved to the Azersun Arena in Baku.

==== League table ====
Pos	Team	Pld	W	D	L	GF	GA	GD	Pts	Qualification or relegation
1	Qarabağ (C)	28	20	5	3	37	13	+24	65	Qualification for the Champions League first qualifying round
2	Gabala	28	14	7	7	43	26	+17	49	Qualification for the Europa League first qualifying round
3	Neftçi Baku	28	14	4	10	39	28	+11	46	Qualification for the Europa League first qualifying round
4	Zira	28	12	8	8	36	30	+6	44	
5	Sumgayit	28	11	7	10	34	33	+1	40	

Source: UEFA, Soccerway
Rules for classification: 1) Points; 2) Head-to-head points; 3) Head-to-head goal difference; 4) Head-to-head goals scored; 5) Head-to-head away goals scored (only if two teams); 6) Goal difference; 7) Goals scored.
(C) Champions

=== Azerbaijan Cup ===
28 November 2017 Second Round	Qarabağ	2–0	Qaradağ Lökbatan	Baku
16:00 AZT (UTC+4)	Ismayilov 57'; Henrique 81'	Report	M.Rahimov (yellow card) 66'	Stadium: Azersun Arena; Attendance: 900; Referee: Ramil Diniyev

11 December 2017 Quarterfinal 1st leg	Qarabağ	2–1	Sumgayit	Baku
19:00 AZT (UTC+4)	Richard 57'; Henrique 85'	Report	Eyyubov 23'; A.Salahli (yellow card) 51'; Valiyev (red card) 88'	Stadium: Azersun Arena; Attendance: 450; Referee: Ramil Diniyev

14 December 2017 Quarterfinal 2nd leg	Sumgayit	2–0 (3–2 agg.)	Qarabağ	Sumqayit
AZT (UTC+4)	K.Mirzayev 22'; B.Hasanalizade (yellow card) 51'; M.Cənnətov (yellow card) 88'; Yunanov 90' (yellow card) 90'	Report	Guerrier (yellow card) 58'; Rzeźniczak (yellow card) 63'; Míchel (yellow card) 87'	Stadium: Kapital Bank Arena; Attendance: 1,326; Referee: Rahim Hasanov

=== UEFA Champions League ===
==== Qualifying rounds ====
11 July 2017 Second qualifying round 1st leg	Qarabağ (Azerbaijan)	5–0	(Georgia (country)) Samtredia	Baku, Azerbaijan
21:00 AZT (UTC+4)	Ismayilov 10' (pen.); Ndlovu 37', 45+1' (pen.); Guerrier 83'; Míchel 90+2'	Report	Mandzhgaladze (yellow card) 5'; Baldé (yellow card) 8'; G.Datunaishvili (yellow card) 10'; G.Samushia (yellow card) 58'	Stadium: Tofiq Bahramov Republican Stadium (Note: Qarabağ will play their home match at Tofiq Bahramov Republican Stadium, Baku, instead of their regular stadium Azersun Arena, Baku.); Attendance: 21,500; Referee: Mete Kalkavan (Turkey)

18 July 2017 Second qualifying round 2nd leg	Samtredia (Georgia (country))	0–1 (0–6 agg.)	(Azerbaijan) Qarabağ	Tbilisi, (Note: Samtredia will play their home match at Boris Paichadze Dinamo Arena, Tbilisi, instead of their regular stadium Erosi Manjgaladze Stadium, Samtredia.) Georgia
21:00 AZT (UTC+4)	D.Razhamashvili (yellow card) 53'; N.Sandokhadze (yellow card) 58'	Report	Guerrier 22'; Amirguliyev (yellow card) 67'; Ramazanov (yellow card) 88'	Stadium: Boris Paichadze Dinamo Arena; Attendance: 1,835; Referee: Srđan Jovanović (Serbia)

25 July 2017 Third qualifying round 1st leg	Qarabağ (Azerbaijan)	0–0	(Moldova) Sheriff Tiraspol	Baku, Azerbaijan
21:00 AZT (UTC+4)		Report		Stadium: Tofiq Bahramov Republican Stadium; Attendance: 26,000; Referee: Sergey Tsinkevich (Belarus)

1 August 2017 Third qualifying round 2nd leg	Sheriff Tiraspol (Moldova)	1–2 (1–2 agg.)	(Azerbaijan) Qarabağ	Tiraspol, Moldova
21:00 AZT (UTC+4)	Posmac (yellow card) 37'; Damașcan (yellow card) 44'; Brezovec (yellow card) 47'; Badibanga 90+4' (pen.)	Report	Guerrier (yellow card) 28'; Míchel (yellow card) 35' (goal) 86'; Ndlovu 45+3'; Šehić (yellow card) 57'; Agolli (yellow card) 73'; Sadygov (yellow card) 90+4'	Stadium: Sheriff Stadium; Attendance: 7,742; Referee: Roi Reinshreiber (Israel)

15 August 2017 Playoff round 1st leg	Qarabağ (Azerbaijan)	1–0	(Denmark) Copenhagen	Baku, Azerbaijan
22:45 AZT (UTC+4)	Madatov 25'	Report	Verbič (yellow card) 71'; Amankwaa (yellow card) 90+3'	Stadium: Tofiq Bahramov Republican Stadium; Attendance: 31,250; Referee: Paolo Tagliavento (Italy)

22 August 2017 Playoff round 2nd leg	Copenhagen (Denmark)	2–1 (2 – 2 (a) agg.)	(Azerbaijan) Qarabağ	Copenhagen, Denmark
22:45 AZT (UTC+4)	Lüftner (yellow card) 4'; Santander 45'; Pavlović 66'; Ankersen (yellow card) 77'; Toutouh (yellow card) 86'	Report	Míchel (yellow card) 44'; Ndlovu 63' (yellow card) 90+3'; Rzeźniczak (yellow card) 75'	Stadium: Parken Stadium; Attendance: 21,222; Referee: Alberto Undiano Mallenco (Spain)

==== Group stage ====
Pos	Team	Pld	W	D	L	GF	GA	GD	Pts	Qualification	ROM	CHE	ATM	QRB
1	(Italy) Roma	6	3	2	1	9	6	+3	11 (Note: Head-to-head results: Chelsea 3–3 Roma, Roma 3–0 Chelsea.)	Advance to knockout phase	—	3–0	0–0	1–0
2	(England) Chelsea	6	3	2	1	16	8	+8	11	Advance to knockout phase	3–3	—	1–1	6–0
3	(Spain) Atlético Madrid	6	1	4	1	5	4	+1	7	Transfer to Europa League	2–0	1–2	—	1–1
4	(Azerbaijan) Qarabağ	6	0	2	4	2	14	−12	2		1–2	0–4	0–0	—

Source: UEFA
Notes:

12 September 2017 1	Chelsea (England)	6–0	(Azerbaijan) Qarabağ	London, England
22:45 AZT (UTC+4)	Pedro 5'; Cahill (yellow card) 16'; Zappacosta 30'; Azpilicueta 55'; Bakayoko 71'; Batshuayi 76'; Medvedev 82' (o.g.)	Report		Stadium: Stamford Bridge; Attendance: 41,150; Referee: Anastasios Sidiropoulos (Greece)

27 September 2017 2	Qarabağ (Azerbaijan)	1–2	(Italy) Roma	Baku, Azerbaijan
20:00 AZT (UTC+4)	Henrique 28' (yellow card) 41'; Garayev (yellow card) 41'	Report	Manolas 7'; Džeko 15'; Gonalons (yellow card) 43'	Stadium: Baku Olympic Stadium; Attendance: 67,200; Referee: Artur Soares Dias

18 October 2017 3	Qarabağ (Azerbaijan)	0–0	(Spain) Atlético Madrid	Baku, Azerbaijan
20:00 AZT (UTC+4)	Míchel (yellow card) 53'; Ndlovu (yellow card) 59' (yellow-red card) 75'; Guseynov (yellow card) 90+4'	Report		Stadium: Baku Olympic Stadium; Attendance: 47,923; Referee: Ruddy Buquet (France)

31 October 2017 4	Atlético Madrid (Spain)	1–1	(Azerbaijan) Qarabağ	Madrid, Spain
23:45 AZT (UTC+4)	Savić (yellow card) 32' (yellow-red card) 88'; Partey 56'; Torres (yellow card) 75'	Report	Sadygov (yellow card) 9'; Rzeźniczak (yellow card) 34'; Míchel 40'; Henrique (red card) 59'	Stadium: Wanda Metropolitano; Attendance: 55,893; Referee: Deniz Aytekin (Germany)

22 November 2017 5	Qarabağ (Azerbaijan)	0–4	(England) Chelsea	Baku, Azerbaijan
21:00 AZT (UTC+4)	Sadygov (red card) 19'; Rzeźniczak (yellow card) 41'; Medvedev (yellow card) 71'	Report	Hazard 21' (pen.); Willian 36', 85'; Alonso (yellow card) 53'; Fàbregas 73' (pen.)	Stadium: Baku Olympic Stadium; Attendance: 67,100; Referee: Jorge Sousa (Portugal)

5 December 2017 6	Roma (Italy)	1–0	(Azerbaijan) Qarabağ	Rome, Italy
23:45 AZT (UTC+4)	Perotti 53'; Džeko (yellow card) 61'	Report	Guerrier (yellow card) 42'; Míchel (yellow card) 57'; Yunuszade (yellow card) 61'; Rzeźniczak (yellow card) 88'	Stadium: Stadio Olimpico; Attendance: 34,258; Referee: Tobias Stieler (Germany)

== Squad statistics ==
As of Match played 21 May 2018

=== Appearances and goals ===
No.	Pos	Nat	Player	Total		Premier League		Azerbaijan Cup		Champions League	
No.	Pos	Nat	Player	Apps	Goals	Apps	Goals	Apps	Goals	Apps	Goals
1	GK	(Ukraine) UKR	Anton Kanibolotskiy	8	0	6	0	1	0	1	0
2	MF	(Azerbaijan) AZE	Gara Garayev	35	0	16+5	0	2	0	12	0
5	DF	(Azerbaijan) AZE	Maksim Medvedev	34	1	20+2	1	0	0	12	0
7	MF	(Azerbaijan) AZE	Rahid Amirguliyev	18	0	13+2	0	2	0	0+1	0
8	MF	(Spain) ESP	Míchel	37	6	18+5	3	2	0	12	3
10	MF	(Brazil) BRA	Pedro Henrique	26	6	15+4	3	2+1	2	4	1
11	FW	(Azerbaijan) AZE	Mahir Madatov	37	9	19+5	8	2	0	9+2	1
12	GK	(Azerbaijan) AZE	Shahrudin Mahammadaliyev	5	0	4+1	0	0	0	0	0
13	GK	(Bosnia and Herzegovina) BIH	Ibrahim Šehić	31	0	18	0	2	0	11	0
14	DF	(Azerbaijan) AZE	Rashad Sadygov	26	0	18	0	0	0	7+1	0
20	MF	(Azerbaijan) AZE	Richard	35	6	17+5	5	1	1	11+1	0
21	DF	(Azerbaijan) AZE	Arif Dashdemirov	5	0	4	0	1	0	0	0
22	MF	(Azerbaijan) AZE	Afran Ismayilov	24	4	7+6	2	2+1	1	3+5	1
25	DF	(Albania) ALB	Ansi Agolli	29	0	13+6	0	0	0	10	0
30	DF	(Azerbaijan) AZE	Abbas Hüseynov	13	0	9+1	0	3	0	0	0
32	DF	(Azerbaijan) AZE	Elvin Yunuszade	28	2	19+1	2	3	0	1+4	0
33	MF	(Azerbaijan) AZE	Eltun Turabov	1	0	1	0	0	0	0	0
39	FW	(Azerbaijan) AZE	Zauer Fərzəliyev	1	0	0+1	0	0	0	0	0
44	FW	(Azerbaijan) AZE	Aghabala Ramazanov	10	0	2+4	0	0	0	0+4	0
52	DF	(Poland) POL	Jakub Rzeźniczak	27	0	12+2	0	2	0	8+3	0
55	DF	(Azerbaijan) AZE	Badavi Guseynov	15	0	4+2	0	0	0	9	0
70	MF	(Azerbaijan) AZE	Nijat Suleymanov	1	0	0+1	0	0	0	0	0
77	MF	(Haiti) HAI	Wilde-Donald Guerrier	30	3	12+3	1	3	0	9+3	2
90	FW	(Azerbaijan) AZE	Ramil Sheydayev	19	1	9+6	1	1+1	0	1+1	0
91	MF	(Azerbaijan) AZE	Joshgun Diniyev	28	1	16+6	1	1+2	0	1+2	0
98	MF	(Azerbaijan) AZE	Ruslan Hajiyev	1	0	0+1	0	0	0	0	0
99	MF	(Spain) ESP	Dani Quintana	28	5	17+5	5	1+1	0	0+4	0
Players away on loan:
88	MF	(Azerbaijan) AZE	Elshan Abdullayev	6	0	4+1	0	1	0	0	0
Players who left Qarabağ during the season:
9	FW	(South Africa) RSA	Dino Ndlovu	25	9	10+3	5	1	0	11	4
16	DF	(Azerbaijan) AZE	Ibrahim Aslanli	1	0	1	0	0	0	0	0
18	FW	(Norway) NOR	Tarik Elyounoussi	8	0	4	0	0+1	0	0+3	0

=== Goal scorers ===
Place	Position	Nation	Number	Name	Premier League	Azerbaijan Cup	Champions League	Total
1	FW	(Azerbaijan)	11	Mahir Madatov	8	0	1	9
1	FW	(South Africa)	9	Dino Ndlovu	5	0	4	9
3	MF	(Azerbaijan)	20	Richard	5	1	0	6
3	MF	(Brazil)	10	Pedro Henrique	3	2	1	6
3	MF	(Spain)	8	Míchel	3	0	3	6
6	MF	(Spain)	99	Dani Quintana	5	0	0	5
7	MF	(Azerbaijan)	22	Afran Ismayilov	2	1	1	4
8	MF	(Haiti)	77	Wilde-Donald Guerrier	1	0	2	3
9	DF	(Azerbaijan)	32	Elvin Yunuszade	2	0	0	2
10	MF	(Azerbaijan)	91	Joshgun Diniyev	1	0	0	1
10	DF	(Azerbaijan)	5	Maksim Medvedev	1	0	0	1
10	FW	(Azerbaijan)	90	Ramil Sheydayev	1	0	0	1
				TOTALS	37	4	12	53

=== Disciplinary record ===
Number	Nation	Position	Name	Premier League		Azerbaijan Cup		Champions League		Total	
Number	Nation	Position	Name	Yellow card	Red card	Yellow card	Red card	Yellow card	Red card	Yellow card	Red card
2	(Azerbaijan)	MF	Gara Garayev	1	0	0	0	1	0	2	0
5	(Azerbaijan)	DF	Maksim Medvedev	1	0	0	0	1	0	2	0
7	(Azerbaijan)	MF	Rahid Amirguliyev	2	0	0	0	1	0	3	0
8	(Spain)	MF	Míchel	7	1	1	0	4	0	12	1
10	(Brazil)	MF	Pedro Henrique	2	0	0	0	1	1	3	1
11	(Azerbaijan)	FW	Mahir Madatov	2	0	0	0	0	0	2	0
12	(Azerbaijan)	GK	Shahrudin Mahammadaliyev	1	0	0	0	0	0	1	0
13	(Bosnia and Herzegovina)	GK	Ibrahim Šehić	0	1	0	0	1	0	1	1
14	(Azerbaijan)	DF	Rashad Sadygov	4	0	0	0	2	1	6	1
20	(Azerbaijan)	MF	Richard	4	0	0	0	0	0	4	0
21	(Azerbaijan)	DF	Arif Dashdemirov	1	0	0	0	0	0	1	0
25	(Albania)	DF	Ansi Agolli	3	1	0	0	1	0	4	1
32	(Azerbaijan)	DF	Elvin Yunuszade	2	0	0	0	1	0	3	0
44	(Azerbaijan)	FW	Aghabala Ramazanov	1	0	0	0	1	0	2	0
52	(Poland)	DF	Jakub Rzeźniczak	4	0	1	0	4	0	9	0
55	(Azerbaijan)	DF	Badavi Guseynov	0	0	0	0	1	0	1	0
77	(Haiti)	MF	Wilde-Donald Guerrier	4	0	1	0	2	0	7	0
90	(Azerbaijan)	FW	Ramil Sheydayev	1	0	0	0	0	0	1	0
91	(Azerbaijan)	MF	Joshgun Diniyev	2	1	0	0	0	0	2	1
Players who left Qarabağ during the season:
9	(South Africa)	FW	Dino Ndlovu	2	0	0	0	3	1	5	1
18	(Norway)	FW	Tarik Elyounoussi	2	0	0	0	0	0	2	0
			TOTALS	46	4	3	0	25	2	74	6
