= Wanderson (footballer, born September 1991) =

Brazilian footballer

Personal information
- Full name: Wanderson Henrique do Nascimento Silva
- Date of birth: 13 September 1991 (age 35)
- Place of birth: Brazil
- Height: 1.75 m (5 ft 9 in)
- Position: Left-back

Team information
- Current team: Gagra
- Number: 25

Youth career
- Atlético Mineiro

Senior career*
Years	Team	Apps	(Gls)
2012	Vila Nova	1	(0)
2013	CA Juventus	0	(0)
2014	São José EC	0	(0)
2014	Operário	9	(0)
2015	Grêmio Anápolis	0	(0)
2015	Operário	7	(0)
2016–2018	Bnei Sakhnin	77	(0)
2018–2019	Sabah	25	(1)
2019–2020	São Caetano	0	(0)
2020–2023	Dila Gori	113	(5)
2024	Dinamo Batumi	23	(0)
2025–	Gagra	36	(4)
- * Club domestic league appearances and goals as of 8 December 2025

Wanderson Henrique do Nascimento Silva (born 13 September 1991), known as Wanderson, is a Brazilian professional footballer who plays for Gagra in the Erovnuli Liga as a left-back.

== Career ==
On 13 February 2016, Wanderson made his debut for Bnei Sakhnin in the Israeli Premier League a 2–0 away victory against Bnei Yehuda.

On 23 July 2018, Wanderson signed a one-year contract with Azerbaijan Premier League side Sabah FK. On 15 May 2019, Sabah confirmed Wanderson's release.

In 2020, he moved to neighbouring Georgia. After four seasons spent at Dila Gori, in early 2024 Wanderson signed for reigning champions Dinamo Batumi.

A year later, he joined Gagra.

== Career statistics ==
As of 6 December 2025

Appearances and goals by club, season and competition
Club	Season	League			State League		National cup		Continental		Other		Total	
Club	Season	Division	Apps	Goals	Apps	Goals	Apps	Goals	Apps	Goals	Apps	Goals	Apps	Goals
Vila Nova	2012	Série C	1	0	2 (Note: Appearance(s) in Campeonato Goiano)	0	—		—		—		3	0
CA Juventus	2013	Paulista Série A2	—		—		—		—		2 (Note: Appearance(s) in Copa Paulista)	0	2	0
São José	2014	Paulista Série A2	—		3 (Note: Appearance(s) in Paulista Série A2)	0	—		—		—		3	0
Operário	2014	Série D	9	0	—		—		—		—		9	0
Grêmio Anápolis	2015	Campeonato Goiano	—		13	1	—		—		—		13	1
Operário	2015	Série D	7	0	—		—		—		—		7	0
Bnei Sakhnin	2015-16	Israeli Premier League	14	0	—		3	0	—		—		17	0
Bnei Sakhnin	2016-17	Israeli Premier League	36	0	—		2	0	—		4 (Note: Appearance(s) in Toto Cup)	0	42	0
Bnei Sakhnin	2017-18	Israeli Premier League	27	0	—		1	0	—		3	0	31	0
Bnei Sakhnin	Total		77	0	—		6	0	—		7	0	90	0
Sabah	2018-19	Azerbaijan Premier League	25	1	—		3	0	—		—		28	1
São Caetano	2020	Série D	—		5	0	—		—		—		5	0
Dila Gori	2020	Erovnuli Liga	5	0	—		2	1	—		—		7	1
Dila Gori	2021	Erovnuli Liga	36	3	—		1	0	2 (Note: Appearance(s) in UEFA Europa Conference League)	1	—		39	4
Dila Gori	2022	Erovnuli Liga	36	0	—		3	1	2	0	—		41	1
Dila Gori	2023	Erovnuli Liga	36	2	—		2	0	6	0	2 (Note: Appearance(s) in Georgian Super Cup)	0	46	2
Dila Gori	Total		113	5	—		8	2	10	1	2	0	133	8
Dinamo Batumi	2024	Erovnuli Liga	23	0	2	0	4	0	2	0	—		31	0
Gagra	2025	Erovnuli Liga	36	4	0	0	—		—		—		36	4
Career total			291	10	24	1	18	2	14	1	13	0	360	14
