= Ramil Sheydayev =

Azerbaijani-Russian footballer (born 1996)

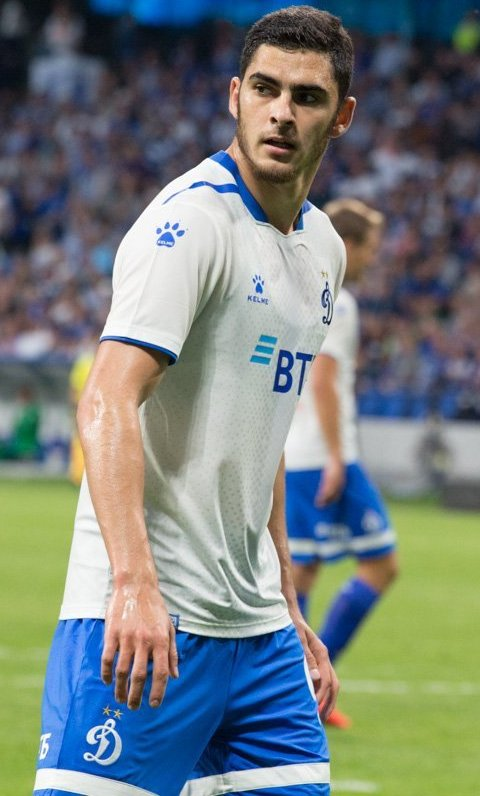
- Sheydayev with Dynamo Moscow in 2019

Personal information
- Full name: Ramil Teymurovich Sheydayev
- Date of birth: 15 March 1996 (age 30)
- Place of birth: Saint Petersburg, Russia
- Height: 1.87 m (6 ft 2 in)
- Positions: Winger; forward

Team information
- Current team: Sochi
- Number: 7

Youth career
- Zenit Saint Petersburg

Senior career*
Years	Team	Apps	(Gls)
2013–2016	Zenit Saint Petersburg	5	(0)
2014–2015	→ Zenit-2 Saint Petersburg	32	(18)
2015	→ Rubin Kazan (loan)	1	(0)
2016	→ Zenit-2 Saint Petersburg	12	(10)
2016–2018	Trabzonspor	1	(0)
2017	→ Žilina (loan)	13	(5)
2017–2018	→ Qarabağ (loan)	15	(1)
2018–2019	Krylia Sovetov Samara	18	(4)
2019	Dynamo Moscow	8	(0)
2020–2021	Sabah	28	(6)
2021–2023	Qarabağ	60	(29)
2023	Buriram United	10	(1)
2024	Kocaelispor	16	(1)
2024–2025	Neftçi	27	(4)
2025–2026	Qarabağ	10	(2)
2026–	Sochi	7	(0)

International career^{‡}
2011–2012	Russia U16	16	(6)
2012–2013	Russia U17	17	(7)
2014–2015	Russia U18	8	(6)
2015–2016	Russia U19	7	(11)
2015–2016	Russia U21	13	(8)
2018	Azerbaijan U21	3	(0)
2016–2024	Azerbaijan	69	(10)
- * Club domestic league appearances and goals as of 18 September 2026 ‡ National team caps and goals as of 03 April 2024

Ramil Teymurovich Sheydayev (Azerbaijani: Ramil Teymur oğlu Şeydayev; Russian: Рамиль Теймурович Шейдаев; born 15 March 1996) is an Azerbaijani professional footballer who plays as forward for Sochi in the Russian First League and the Azerbaijan national team.

== Early and personal life ==
He was born in Saint Petersburg to an Azerbaijani father and a Russian mother.

== Club career ==
=== Zenit Saint Petersburg ===
Sheydayev made his professional debut in the Russian Professional Football League for Zenit-2 Saint Petersburg on 19 April 2014 in a game against Znamya Truda.

He made his Russian Premier League debut for Zenit Saint Petersburg on 26 October 2014 in a game against FC Mordovia Saransk.

He left Zenit on 5 July 2016.

=== Trabzonspor ===
On 12 July 2016, Sheydayev signed a four-year contract with Trabzonspor. Sheydayev made his Süper Lig debut for Trabzonspor in a 1–0 away victory against Kayserispor on 5 December 2016. He scored his first goal for Trabzonspor in the Turkish Cup match against Ardahanspor in a 6–0 home victory on 21 September 2016.

He left Trabzonspor on 9 August 2018.

==== Loan to Žilina ====
On 11 February 2017, it was announced that Sheydayev had joined Slovak club Žilina on loan for 1.5 years. On 26 February 2017, Sheydayev made his Žilina debut in a 4–1 home victory against Zlaté Moravce, in which he played the full 90 minutes. He scored his first goal for Žilina in the Slovak Super Liga match against Tatran Prešov in a 3–0 home victory on 2 April 2017. Ramil also played for Žilina B a total of five games and scored five goals in the Slovakia 2. Liga.

Sheydayev made his European debut in 2017 against Danish Copenhagen in the second qualification round of the UEFA Champions League in Štadión pod Dubňom.

==== Loan to Qarabağ ====
On 31 August 2017, Qarabağ announced the signing of Sheydayev on a season-long loan deal. Sheydayev made his Azerbaijan Premier League debut for Qarabağ in a 2–0 home victory against Kapaz on 17 September 2017. He scored his first goal for Qarabağ in the Azerbaijan Premier League match against Kapaz in a 1–0 away victory on 14 April 2018.

Sheydayev made his debut for the UEFA Champions League group stage game in a 1–1 away draw against Atlético Madrid in Wanda Metropolitano on 31 October 2017.

=== Krylia Sovetov Samara ===
On 17 August 2018, Sheydayev signed one-year contract with Krylia Sovetov Samara. He made his Russian Premier League debut with Krylia Sovetov Samara on 19 August 2018 as a substitute for Vladimir Poluyakhtov in a game against Lokomotiv Moscow. He opened the 2019 calendar year part of the season by scoring in three games in a row, as Krylia acquired seven points, including a goal on his 23rd birthday against Anzhi Makhachkala.

=== Dynamo Moscow ===
On 2 July 2019, he signed a one-year contract with Dynamo Moscow. Dynamo terminated his contract on 9 January 2020.

=== Sabah ===
On 17 February 2020, Sheydayev signed for Sabah on a contract until the end of the 2019–20 season. On 1 August 2020, he extended his contract with Sabah, until June 2021. Sheydayev left Sabah in June 2021 when his contract expired.

=== Qarabağ ===
On 1 July 2021, Qarabağ announced the signing of Sheydayev on a two-year contract. On 31 May 2023, Qarabağ announced that Sheydayev had left the club following the expiration of his contract.

=== Neftçi ===
On 16 July 2024, Neftçi announced the signing of Sheydayev from Kocaelispor to a three-year contract. On 10 September 2025, Neftçi announced that their contract with Sheydayev had been terminated by mutual agreement having scored four goals in thirty-one games.

=== Back to Qarabağ ===
On 18 September 2025, Qarabağ announced the signing of Sheydayev. On 23 May 2026, Qarabağ announced that Sheydayev had left the club.

=== Sochi ===
On 3 August 2026, Russian First League club Sochi announced the signing of Sheydayev to a one-year contract.

== International career ==
=== Russian national youth teams ===
Sheydayev won the 2013 UEFA European Under-17 Championship with Russia, scoring two goals in the semifinal penalty shootout against Sweden and one more in the final penalty shootout against Italy. He also participated in the 2013 FIFA U-17 World Cup.

Later he represented Russia national under-19 football team at the 2015 UEFA European Under-19 Championship, where Russia came in second place, and he was selected for the team of the tournament.

=== Azerbaijan ===
Sheydayev was called up and played for the Azerbaijan national team in a 2018 FIFA World Cup qualification 1–0 win over San Marino.

On 8 October 2017, he scored his first senior international goal for the Azerbaijan national team, in a 2018 FIFA World Cup qualification against Germany in Kaiserslautern.

He is currently ranked as the second highest all-time goalscorer in the history of the national team with 9 goals (tied with Emin Makhmudov and Vagif Javadov).

== Career statistics ==
=== Club ===
As of match played 22 May 2023

Appearances and goals by club, season and competition
Club	Season	League			National cup		Continental		Other		Total	
Club	Season	Division	Apps	Goals	Apps	Goals	Apps	Goals	Apps	Goals	Apps	Goals
Zenit Saint Petersburg	2013–14	Russian Premier League	0	0	0	0	0 (Note: Appearances and goals in the UEFA Champions League)	0	0 (Note: Appearances and goals in Russian Super Cup)	0	0	0
Zenit Saint Petersburg	2014–15	Russian Premier League	5	0	0	0	0 (Note: Zero appearances in the UEFA Champions League, zero appearances in the UEFA Europa League)	0	–		5	0
Zenit Saint Petersburg	2015–16	Russian Premier League	0	0	0	0	0	0	0	0	0	0
Zenit Saint Petersburg	Total		5	0	0	0	0	0	0	0	5	0
Zenit-2 Saint Petersburg	2013–14	Russian PFL	5	2	–		–		–		5	2
Zenit-2 Saint Petersburg	2014–15	Russian PFL	26	16	–		–		–		26	16
Zenit-2 Saint Petersburg	2015–16	Russian FNL	13	10	–		–		–		13	10
Zenit-2 Saint Petersburg	Total		44	28	0	0	0	0	0	0	44	28
Rubin Kazan (loan)	2015–16	Russian Premier League	1	0	1	0	0 (Note: Appearances and goals in the UEFA Europa League)	0	–		2	0
Trabzonspor	2016–17	Süper Lig	1	0	2	1	–		–		3	1
Trabzonspor	2017–18	Süper Lig	0	0	0	0	–		–		0	0
Trabzonspor	Total		1	0	2	1	0	0	0	0	3	0
MŠK Žilina (loan)	2016–17	Slovak Super Liga	12	5	1	0	–		–		13	5
MŠK Žilina (loan)	2017–18	Slovak Super Liga	1	0	0	0	2	0	–		3	0
MŠK Žilina (loan)	Total		13	5	1	0	2	0	0	0	16	5
MŠK Žilina-2 (loan)	2016–17	2. Liga	2	2	–		–		–		2	2
MŠK Žilina-2 (loan)	2017–18	2. Liga	3	3	–		–		–		3	3
MŠK Žilina-2 (loan)	Total		5	5	0	0	0	0	0	0	5	5
Qarabağ (loan)	2017–18	Azerbaijan Premier League	15	1	2	0	2	0	—		15	1
Krylia Sovetov	2018–19	Russian Premier League	18	4	0	0	–		2 (Note: Appearances and goals in the Russian Premier League Playoff)	0	20	4
Dynamo Moscow	2019–20	Russian Premier League	8	0	1	0	–		–		9	0
Sabah	2019–20	Azerbaijan Premier League	3	0	0	0	–		–		3	0
Sabah	2020–21	Azerbaijan Premier League	25	6	1	0	–		–		26	6
Sabah	Total		28	6	1	0	0	0	0	0	29	6
Qarabağ	2021–22	Azerbaijan Premier League	25	7	5	4	14 (Note: Appearances and goals in the UEFA Europa Conference League)	2	—		44	13
Qarabağ	2022–23	Azerbaijan Premier League	35	22	2	0	16 (Note: Eight appearances in the UEFA Champions League, six appearances and one goal in the UEFA Europa League, two appearances in the UEFA Europa Conference League)	1	—		53	23
Qarabağ	Total		60	29	7	4	30	3	0	0	97	36
Buriram United	2023–24	Thai League 1	10	1	1	0	5 (Note: Appearances and goals in the AFC Champions League)	0	–		16	1
Kocaelispor	2023–24	TFF 1. Lig	15	1	0	0	–		1 (Note: Appearance in the Süper Lig Playoffs)	0	9	0
Neftçi	2024–25	Azerbaijan Premier League	27	4	4	0	–		–		31	4
Neftçi	2025–26	Azerbaijan Premier League	0	0	0	0	–		–		0	0
Neftçi	Total		27	4	4	0	0	0	0	0	31	4
Career total			225	82	19	5	34	0	2	0	280	90

=== International ===
As of match played 20 November 2022

Appearances and goals by national team and year
National team	Year	Apps	Goals
Azerbaijan	2016	4	0
Azerbaijan	2017	6	1
Azerbaijan	2018	6	0
Azerbaijan	2019	10	3
Azerbaijan	2020	6	1
Azerbaijan	2021	11	2
Azerbaijan	2022	9	2
Total		52	9

Scores and results list Azerbaijan's goal tally first, score column indicates score after each Sheydayev goal.

List of international goals scored by Ramil Sheydayev
No.	Date	Venue	Opponent	Score	Result	Competition
1	8 October 2017	Fritz-Walter-Stadion, Kaiserslautern, Germany	Germany	1–1	1–5	2018 FIFA World Cup qualification
2	21 March 2019	Stadion Maksimir, Zagreb, Croatia	Croatia	1–0	1–2	UEFA Euro 2020 qualification
3	11 June 2019	Bakcell Arena, Baku, Azerbaijan	Slovakia	1–0	1–5	UEFA Euro 2020 qualification
4	9 October 2019	Bahrain National Stadium, Riffa, Bahrain	Bahrain	3–2	3–2	Friendly
5	5 September 2020	Olympic Stadium, Baku, Azerbaijan	Luxembourg	1–0	1–2	2020–21 UEFA Nations League C
6	27 March 2021	Nagyerdei Stadion, Debrecen, Hungary	Qatar	1–0	1–2	Friendly
7	2 June 2021	Dinamo Stadium, Minsk, Belarus	Belarus	2–1	2–1	Friendly
8	13 June 2022	Dalga Arena, Baku, Azerbaijan	Belarus	2–0	2–0	2022–23 UEFA Nations League C
9	20 November 2022	Toše Proeski Arena, Skopje, North Macedonia	North Macedonia	3–1	3–1	Friendly

== Honours ==
Zenit Saint Petersburg

- Russian Premier League: 2014–15

MŠK Žilina

- Fortuna Liga: 2016–17

Qarabağ FK

- Azerbaijan Premier League: 2017–18, 2021–22, 2022–23
- Azerbaijan Cup: 2021–22

Buriram United

- Thai League 1: 2023–24

Russia U17

- UEFA European Under-17 Championship: 2013

Individual

- Azerbaijan Premier League Top Score: 2022–23 (22 Goals),
