= Magsad Isayev =

Azerbaijani footballer (born 1994)

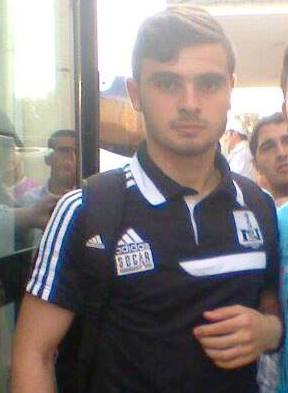

Personal information
- Full name: Magsad Muzaffar oglu Isayev
- Date of birth: 7 June 1994 (age 32)
- Place of birth: Baku, Azerbaijan
- Height: 1.69 m (5 ft 7 in)
- Position: Right-back

Team information
- Current team: Kapaz
- Number: 27

Youth career
- Neftçi Baku

Senior career*
Years	Team	Apps	(Gls)
2013–2017	Neftçi Baku	77	(0)
2018	Keşla	6	(1)
2018–2020	Sabah	39	(1)
2020–2021	Sabail	20	(0)
2021–2023	Gabala	64	(3)
2023–2025	Zira	52	(1)
2025–	Kapaz	20	(1)

International career^{‡}
2010	Azerbaijan U17	3	(0)
2012	Azerbaijan U19	2	(0)
2014–2015	Azerbaijan U21	8	(1)
2017	Azerbaijan U23	5	(1)
Medal record
Men's football
Representing Azerbaijan
Islamic Solidarity Games
Winner	2017 Azerbaijan
- * Club domestic league appearances and goals as of 22 June 2026 ‡ National team caps and goals as of 21 September 2020

Magsad Isayev (Azerbaijani: Məqsəd Müzəffər oğlu İsayev; born 7 June 1994) is an Azerbaijani footballer who plays as a defender for Kapaz in the Azerbaijan Premier League.

== Club career ==
On 30 November 2013, Isayev made his debut in the Azerbaijan Premier League for Neftçi Baku match against Sumgayit.

On 18 June 2021, Isayev signed for Gabala FK on a two-year contract. On 5 June 2023, Gabala announced that Isayev had left the club at the end of his contract.

== Career statistics ==
=== Club ===
As of match played 3 June 2023

Appearances and goals by club, season and competition
Club	Season	League			Cup		Continental		Other		Total	
Club	Season	Division	Apps	Goals	Apps	Goals	Apps	Goals	Apps	Goals	Apps	Goals
Neftçi Baku	2013–14	Azerbaijan Premier League	5	0	6	0	0 (Note: Appearances in the UEFA Champions League)	0	0 (Note: Appearances and goals in the Azerbaijan Supercup)	0	11	0
Neftçi Baku	2014–15	Azerbaijan Premier League	24	0	2	0	2 (Note: Appearances and goals in the UEFA Europa League)	0	—		28	0
Neftçi Baku	2015–16	Azerbaijan Premier League	22	0	3	0	0	0	—		25	0
Neftçi Baku	2016–17	Azerbaijan Premier League	22	0	5	1	4	0	—		31	1
Neftçi Baku	2017–18	Azerbaijan Premier League	4	0	1	0	—				5	0
Neftçi Baku	Total		77	0	17	1	6	0	0	0	100	1
Keşla	2017–18	Azerbaijan Premier League	6	1	0	0	0	0	—		6	1
Sabah	2018–19	Azerbaijan Premier League	24	1	1	0	—				25	1
Sabah	2019–20	Azerbaijan Premier League	15	0	2	0	—				17	0
Sabah	Total		39	1	3	0	-	-	-	-	42	1
Sabail	2020–21	Azerbaijan Premier League	20	0	2	0	—				22	0
Gabala	2021–22	Azerbaijan Premier League	31	1	4	0	—				35	1
Gabala	2022–23	Azerbaijan Premier League	34	2	6	1	2	0	—		42	3
Gabala	Total		64	3	10	1	2	0	-	-	77	4
Career total			207	5	32	2	8	0	0	0	247	7

== Honours ==
=== Club ===
Neftçi

- Azerbaijan Cup: 2013–14

Keşla

- Azerbaijan Cup: 2017–18

=== International ===
Azerbaijan U23

- Islamic Solidarity Games: (1) 2017
