= Tamkin Khalilzade =

Azerbaijani footballer (born 1993)

Tamkin Khalilzadeh
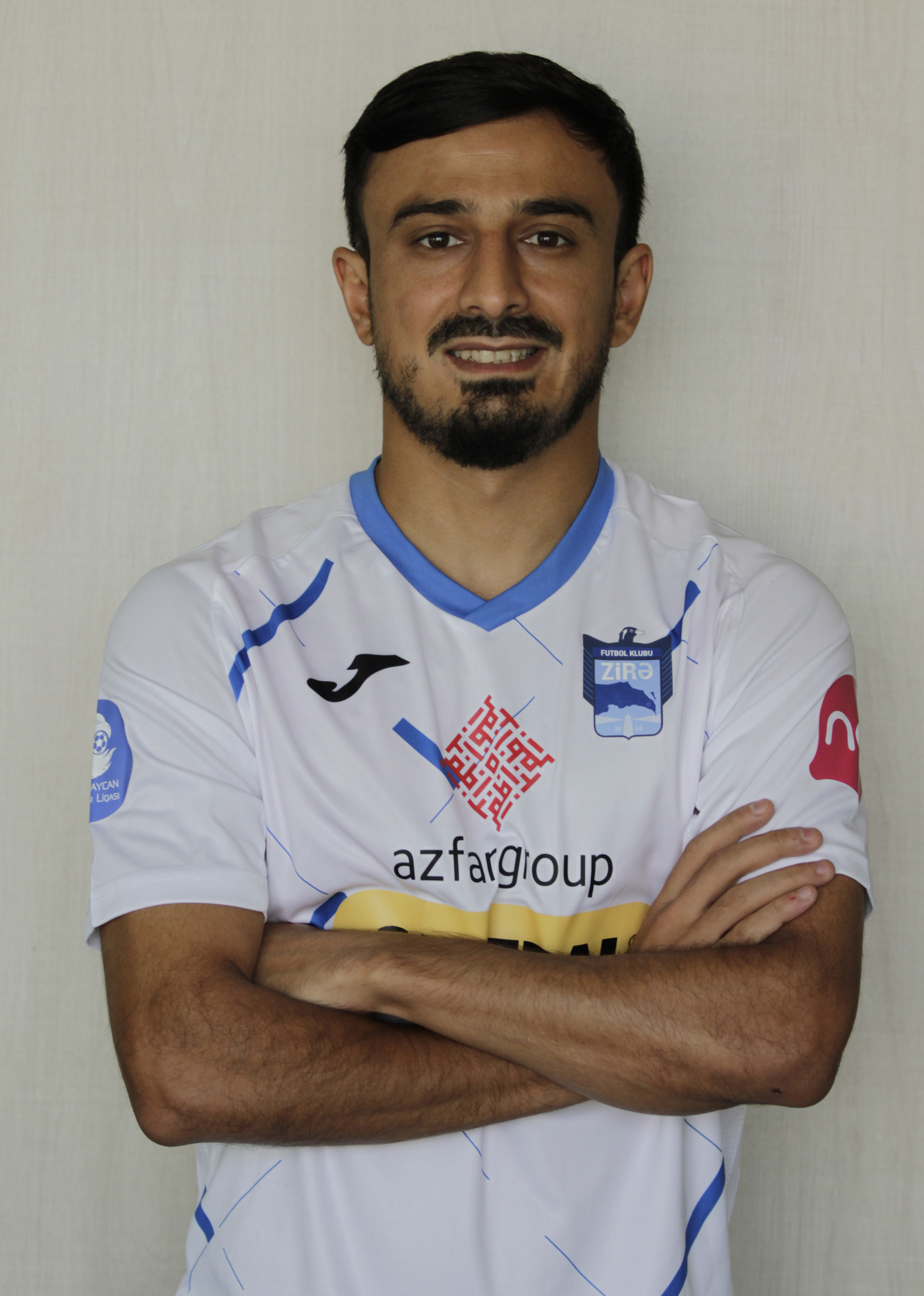

Personal information
- Full name: Tamkin Shaig oglu Khalilzade
- Date of birth: 6 August 1993 (age 33)
- Place of birth: Baku, Azerbaijan
- Height: 1.73 m (5 ft 8 in)
- Positions: Left back; wing back

Youth career
- Qarabağ

Senior career*
Years	Team	Apps	(Gls)
2013–2015	Qarabağ	4	(0)
2014–2015	→ AZAL (loan)	23	(0)
2015–2017	Zira	69	(6)
2018	Gabala	23	(1)
2019–2021	Sabah	41	(3)
2021–2022	Zira	34	(2)

International career^{‡}
2017–	Azerbaijan	17	(3)
- * Club domestic league appearances and goals as of 22 January 2023 ‡ National team caps and goals as of 20 November 2019

Tamkin Khalilzade (Azerbaijani: Təmkin Xəlilzadə; born on 6 August 1993) is an Azerbaijani professional footballer who plays as a defender.

== Club career ==
Khalilzade was born in Baku, Azerbaijan.

On 30 December 2017, Khalilzade signed a 2.5-year contract with Gabala FK.

A year later, on 29 December 2018, Khalilzade signed 2.5-year contract with Sabah FK.

On 25 May 2021, Zira announced the signing of Khalilzade. On 29 December 2022, Zira announced the departure of Khalilzade by mutual agreement.

== International career ==
Khalilzade made his Azerbaijan debut in 2017 against San Marino in 2018 FIFA World Cup qualification.

== Career statistics ==
=== Club ===
As of match played 25 December 2022

Appearances and goals by club, season and competition
Club	Season	League			National Cup		Continental		Other		Total	
Club	Season	Division	Apps	Goals	Apps	Goals	Apps	Goals	Apps	Goals	Apps	Goals
Qarabağ	2013–14	Azerbaijan Premier League	4	0	0	0	0	0	–		4	0
Qarabağ	2014–15	Azerbaijan Premier League	0	0	0	0	–		–		0	0
Qarabağ	Total		4	0	0	0	0	0	-	-	4	0
AZAL (loan)	2014–15	Azerbaijan Premier League	23	0	2	0	–		–		25	0
Zira	2015–16	Azerbaijan Premier League	29	0	1	0	–		–		30	0
Zira	2016–17	Azerbaijan Premier League	27	2	3	0	–		–		30	2
Zira	2017–18	Azerbaijan Premier League	13	4	2	0	4	0	–		19	4
Zira	Total		69	6	6	0	4	0	-	-	79	6
Gabala	2017–18	Azerbaijan Premier League	12	0	3	0	0	0	–		15	0
Gabala	2018–19	Azerbaijan Premier League	11	1	2	0	2	0	–		15	1
Gabala	Total		23	1	5	0	2	0	-	-	30	1
Sabah	2018–19	Azerbaijan Premier League	8	0	0	0	–		–		8	0
Sabah	2019–20	Azerbaijan Premier League	17	0	3	0	–		–		20	0
Sabah	2020–21	Azerbaijan Premier League	16	3	1	0	–		–		17	3
Sabah	Total		41	3	4	0	-	-	-	-	45	3
Zira	2021–22	Azerbaijan Premier League	23	2	5	1	–		–		28	3
Zira	2022–23	Azerbaijan Premier League	11	0	2	0	–		–		13	0
Zira	Total		34	2	7	1	-	-	-	-	41	3
Career total			194	12	24	1	6	0	-	-	224	13

=== International ===
As of 19 November 2019

Azerbaijan national team
Year	Apps	Goals
2017	2	0
2018	8	1
2019	7	2
Total	17	3

=== International goals ===
Scores and results list Azerbaijan's goal tally first.

#	Date	Venue	Opponent	Score	Result	Competition
1.	10 September 2018	Ta' Qali National Stadium, Ta' Qali, Malta	Malta	1–1	1–1	2018–19 UEFA Nations League D
2.	9 September 2019	Bakcell Arena, Baku, Azerbaijan	Croatia	1–1	1–1	UEFA Euro 2020 qualification
3.	9 October 2019	Bahrain National Stadium, Riffa, Bahrain	Bahrain	2–1	3–2	Friendly

== Honours ==
=== Club ===
Qarabağ

- Azerbaijan Premier League: (1) 2013–14,
