= Elgun Nabiyev =

Azerbaijani footballer (born 1997)

Elgun Nebiyev
Personal information
- Date of birth: 4 January 1996 (age 30)
- Place of birth: Azerbaijan
- Height: 1.74 m (5 ft 9 in)
- Position: Winger

Senior career*
| Years | Team | Apps | (Gls) |
| 2015–2017 | Zira | 4 | (0) |
| 2018–2020 | Sabah | 25 | (1) |
| 2019 | → Sumgayit (loan) | 3 | (0) |
| 2020–2021 | Sabail | 2 | (0) |
| 2022–2023 | Limanovia | | |
- * Club domestic league appearances and goals as of 11 April 2022

Elgun Nebiyev (Azerbaijani: Nəbiyev Elgün Mübariz; born 5 January 1997) is an Azerbaijani footballer who plays as a winger.

== Club career ==
On 17 December 2016, Nabiyev made his debut in the Azerbaijan Premier League for Zira match against Sumgayit.
