= Coşqun Diniyev =

Azerbaijani footballer (born 1995)

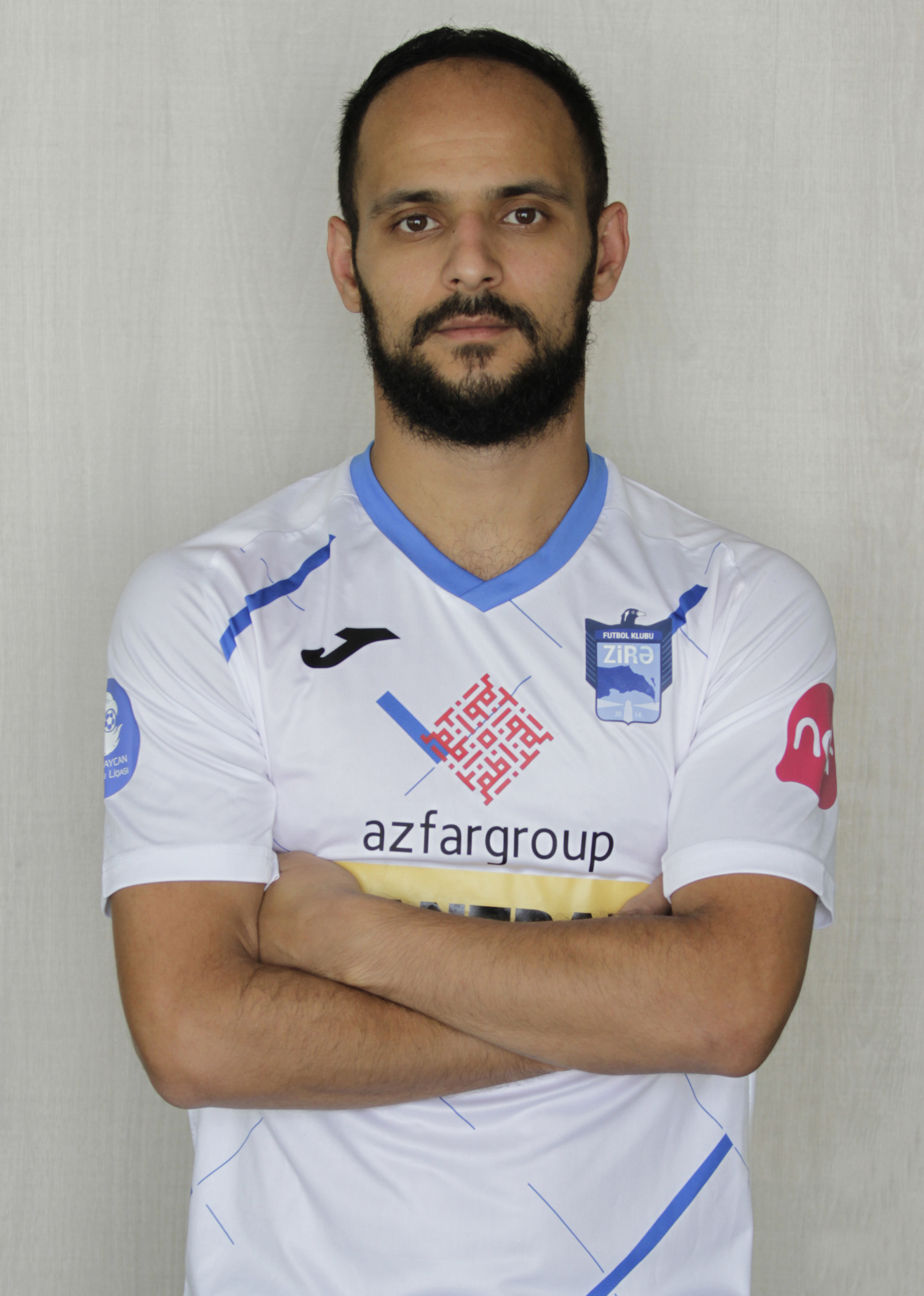

Personal information
- Full name: Coşqun Şahin oğlu Diniyev
- Date of birth: 13 September 1995 (age 31)
- Place of birth: Baku, Azerbaijan
- Height: 1.69 m (5 ft 6 1/2 in)
- Position: Defensive midfielder

Team information
- Current team: Araz-Naxçıvan
- Number: 8

Senior career*
Years	Team	Apps	(Gls)
2012–2015	Inter Baku	35	(2)
2015–2019	Qarabağ	82	(3)
2019–2021	Sabah	51	(2)
2021–2023	Zira	55	(3)
2023	Sabail	0	(0)
2023–2024	Ümraniyespor	30	(3)
2024–2025	Bandırmaspor	20	(0)
2025	Çorum	12	(2)
2025–	Araz-Naxçıvan	24	(1)

International career^{‡}
2011–2012	Azerbaijan U17	2	(0)
2012–2014	Azerbaijan U19	5	(0)
2015	Azerbaijan U21	2	(0)
2017	Azerbaijan U23	5	(0)
2015–	Azerbaijan	28	(0)
Medal record
Men's football
Representing Azerbaijan
Islamic Solidarity Games
Winner	2017 Azerbaijan
- * Club domestic league appearances and goals as of 22 June 2026 ‡ National team caps and goals as of 24 February 2025

Coşqun Şahin oğlu Diniyev (born 13 September 1995) is an Azerbaijani professional footballer who plays as a midfielder for Azerbaijan Premier League club Araz-Naxçıvan and the Azerbaijan national team.

== Personal life ==
Diniyev's father, Şahin Diniyev, is the current manager of Kapaz, for whom his older brother Karim Diniyev also plays for Sabah FC.

== Club career ==
Coşqun Diniyev made his professional debut in the Azerbaijan Premier League for Inter Baku on 18 November 2012 in a game against Turan-Tovuz.

On 1 June 2015, Diniyev signed a two-year contract with Qarabağ FK.

Diniyev made his debut for Qarabağ in a 2–2 away draw against Gabala on 10 August 2015.

Coşqun Diniyev made his debut for UEFA Champions League group stage game against Chelsea in Stamford Bridge on 12 September 2017.

On 13 January 2019, Diniyev signed a three-year contract with Sabah.

On 2 June 2023, Zira announce the departure of Diniyev at the end of his contract. On 21 June 2023, Sabail announced the singing of Diniyev. Two days later, 23 June 2023, Diniyev joined Ümraniyespor after the TFF First League club activated a clause in Diniyevs contract that allowed him to sign for a foreign club.

On 11 February 2025 TFF 1. Lig club Çorum signed a 1.5-year contract with Diniyev.

== International career ==
Diniyev made his Azerbaijan debut on 7 June 2015 against Serbia in friendly match.

== Career statistics ==
=== Club ===
As of match played 14 September 2024

Appearances and goals by club, season and competition
Club	Season	League			National Cup		Continental		Total	
Club	Season	Division	Apps	Goals	Apps	Goals	Apps	Goals	Apps	Goals
Inter Baku	2012–13	Azerbaijan Premier League	2	0	0	0	0	0	2	0
Inter Baku	2013–14	Azerbaijan Premier League	7	0	0	0	0	0	7	0
Inter Baku	2014–15	Azerbaijan Premier League	26	2	3	0	0	0	29	2
Inter Baku	Total		35	2	3	0	0	0	38	2
Qarabağ	2015–16	Azerbaijan Premier League	32	1	5	0	6	0	43	1
Qarabağ	2016–17	Azerbaijan Premier League	21	1	6	2	1	0	18	3
Qarabağ	2017–18	Azerbaijan Premier League	22	1	3	0	3	0	18	3
Qarabağ	2018–19	Azerbaijan Premier League	7	0	2	0	4	0	18	3
Qarabağ	Total		82	3	16	2	14	0	112	5
Sabah	2018–19	Azerbaijan Premier League	13	0	0	0	-		13	0
Sabah	2019–20	Azerbaijan Premier League	14	1	2	0	-		16	1
Sabah	2020–21	Azerbaijan Premier League	22	1	1	0	-		23	1
Sabah	2021–22	Azerbaijan Premier League	2	0	0	0	-		2	0
Sabah	Total		51	2	3	0	-	-	54	2
Zira	2021–22	Azerbaijan Premier League	25	1	5	1	-		30	2
Zira	2022–23	Azerbaijan Premier League	30	2	3	0	2	0	35	2
Zira	Total		55	3	8	1	2	0	60	4
Ümraniyespor	2023–24	TFF 1. Lig	30	3	3	0	-		33	3
Bandırmaspor	2024–25	TFF 1. Lig	4	0	-		-		4	0
Career total			257	13	33	3	16	0	306	13

=== International ===
Azerbaijan national team
Year	Apps	Goals
2015	1	0
2016	2	0
2017	0	0
2018	5	0
2019	0	0
2020	3	0
2021	1	0
2022	2	0
2023	0	0
2024	4	0
Total	18	0

Statistics accurate as of match played 8 September 2024

== Honours ==
Qarabağ FK

- Azerbaijan Premier League (3): 2015–16, 2016–17, 2017–18
- Azerbaijan Cup (1): 2015-16

=== International ===
Azerbaijan U23

- Islamic Solidarity Games: (1) 2017
