= Shahin Diniyev =

Azerbaijani football manager

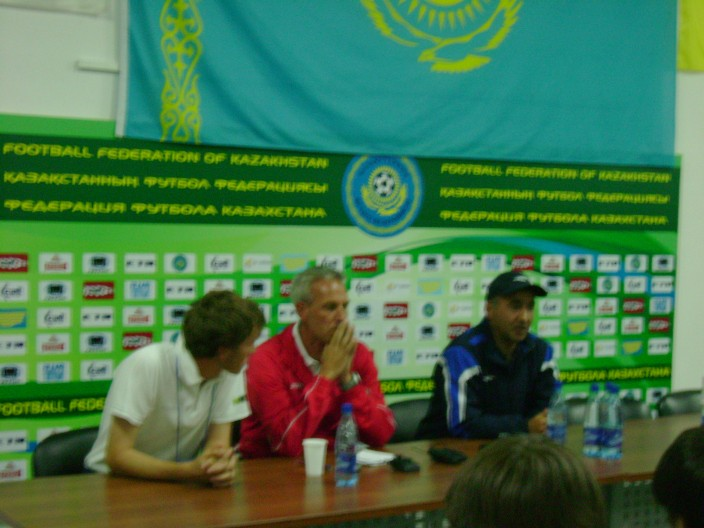
- Diniyev (right) during a press conference

Personal information
- Full name: Shahin Khadakerim oglu Diniyev
- Date of birth: 12 July 1966 (age 60)
- Place of birth: Beylaqan, Azerbaijan SSR, Soviet Union
- Height: 1.69 m (5 ft 7 in)
- Position: Midfielder

Senior career*
Years	Team	Apps	(Gls)
1984	Energetik	32	(4)
1985–1986	Ganclik Baku	46	(7)
1987	Neftchi Baku	0	(0)
1987–1989	Kapaz	62	(13)
1989	Zimbru Chişinău	7	(1)
1990	Fakel Voronezh	10	(0)
1990–1991	Kapaz	55	(15)
1992–1993	Terek Grozny	44	(7)
1994	Hapoel Tayibe	24	(2)
1994–1996	Beitar Tel Aviv	40	(5)
1996–1997	Fərid Baku	4	(0)
1997–1998	Dynamo Baku	5	(0)

International career^{‡}
1992–1996	Azerbaijan	15	(0)

Managerial career
- 1998: Azerbaijan U-16
- 1999: Azerbaijan U-18
- 2000: Shafa Baku
- 2001: Terek Grozny (assist.)
- 2001: Terek Grozny
- 2003–2004: Qarabağ
- 2004–2005: Kapaz
- 2005–2007: Azerbaijan
- 2008–2009: Terek Grozny II
- 2009–2010: Terek Grozny
- 2010: Terek Grozny (assist.)
- 2013–2014: Ravan Baku
- 2015–2017: Kapaz
- 2022–2024: Sabail
- * Club domestic league appearances and goals as of 16 November 2009 ‡ National team caps and goals as of 14 October 2009

Shahin Khadakerim oglu Diniyev (Azerbaijani: Şahin Xadakərim oğlu Diniyev, Russian: Шахин Диниев; born 12 July 1966) is an Azerbaijani football manager and former midfielder who most recently coached Azerbaijan Premier League side Sabail. He served as both captain and head coach of the Azerbaijani national team.

== Early and personal life ==
Diniyev was born on 12 July 1966 in the Beylagan district. At the age of 17, he was admitted to the Azerbaijan State Academy of Physical Education and Sports.

Diniyev's two sons, Karim and Coşqun, are also professional footballers, the latter having been a senior international since 2015.

== Career ==
Diniyev played for clubs in his native Azerbaijan, as well as Russia, Moldova and Israel. After retirement, he became a coach, first with FK Qarabağ and then Kapaz PFC.

In November 2005, he impressed the AFFA sufficiently to be awarded with the national team job, promising to restructure the squad with an emphasis on youth and to help turn Azerbaijan into a credible force within UEFA competition. Replacing Vagif Sadygov, Diniyev's first game in charge was a friendly against Ukraine in Baku at the Tofig Bakhramov Stadium; the result was 0-0, a minor success against stronger opposition.

In further friendlies, a shock 1–1 draw against Turkey and another 0–0 draw against Moldova followed. Diniyev was soon to witness his first defeat as Azerbaijan coach: in August 2006 he watched his team succumb to a 6–0 defeat against Ukraine, this time in Kyiv. This game was the final friendly match before qualification for the 2008 UEFA European Football Championship began.

Under Diniyev, the Azerbaijan squad has given debuts to not only young players but also some naturalised foreigners, such as Leandro Gomes of FC Baku, who was born in Brazil.

In December 2022, Diniyev was appointed as the head coach of the Azerbaijan Premier League club Sabail. On November 3, 2024, he announced his resignation from the head coach position at the club.

== Career statistics ==
=== International ===
Azerbaijan national team
Year	Apps	Goals
1992	1	0
1993	3	0
1994	5	0
1995	4	0
1996	2	0
Total	15	0

Statistics accurate as of 20 October 2015

=== Managerial ===
As of match played 3 November 2024

Name	Managerial Tenure	P	W	D	L	Win %
(Russia) Terek Grozny	2001					0
(Azerbaijan) Qarabağ	2001 –2004					0
(Azerbaijan) Kapaz	2004 –2005					0
Azerbaijan	November 2005 –31 October 2007	20	4	7	9	20
(Russia) Terek Grozny	October 2009 –December 2009	5	0	0	5	0
(Azerbaijan) Ravan Baku	7 October 2013 –3 January 2014	11	1	3	7	9.09
(Azerbaijan) Kapaz	June 2015 – November 2017	80	27	22	31	33.75
(Azerbaijan) Sabail FK	December 2022 – November 2024	72	21	14	37	29.17
