= Dmytro Bezruk =

Ukrainian footballer

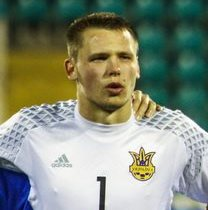

Personal information
- Full name: Dmytro Andriyovych Bezruk
- Date of birth: 30 March 1996 (age 30)
- Place of birth: Velykyi Dalnyk, Ukraine
- Height: 1.88 m (6 ft 2 in)
- Position: Goalkeeper

Youth career
- 2008–2012: Chornomorets Odesa

Senior career*
Years	Team	Apps	(Gls)
2012–2018	Chornomorets Odesa	28	(0)
2019–2020	Sabah	6	(0)

International career^{‡}
2012	Ukraine-16	3	(0)
2012–2013	Ukraine-17	3	(0)
2013–2014	Ukraine-18	4	(0)
2014	Ukraine-19	3	(0)
2016–	Ukraine-21	3	(0)
- * Club domestic league appearances and goals as of 31 January 2023 ‡ National team caps and goals as of 4 February 2016

Dmytro Bezruk (Ukrainian: Дмитро Андрійович Безрук; born 30 March 1996) is a professional Ukrainian football goalkeeper.

== Career ==
Bezruk is a product of FC Chornomorets Youth Sportive School System. His first trainer was Ihor Sokolovskyi.

He made his debut for FC Chornomorets in the game against FC Zorya Luhansk on 16 August 2015 in the Ukrainian Premier League.
