= Elshad Ahmadov =

Azerbaijani footballer and manager (born 1970)

Personal information
- Full name: Elshad Ahmadov
- Date of birth: 25 May 1970 (age 56)
- Place of birth: Baku, Azerbaijan SSR
- Position: Defender

Senior career*
Years	Team	Apps	(Gls)
1987	Avtomobilist	23	(0)
1988	Neftçi		
1989–2001	Qarabağ	281	(7)

International career
1992–1994	Azerbaijan	4	(0)

Managerial career
- 2001: Qarabağ
- 2017: Neftçi (Interim)
- 2018: Khazar Baku
- 2018–2019: Sabah
- * Club domestic league appearances and goals

Elshad Ahmadov (Azerbaijani: Elşad Əhmədov, born on 25 May 1970) is a retired Azerbaijani footballer and former manager of Sabah.

== Managerial career ==
On 15 May 2018, Ahmadov was appointed as a head coach of Sabah FK to replace Arif Asadov.

== Honours ==
=== Manager ===
- Azerbaijan First Division (1): 2017–18
