= Karim Diniyev =

Azerbaijani footballer (born 1993)

Personal information
- Full name: Karim Shahin oglu Diniyev
- Date of birth: 5 September 1993 (age 33)
- Place of birth: Baku, Azerbaijan
- Height: 1.89 m (6 ft 2 1/2 in)
- Position: Defender

Youth career
- 2008–2010: Akhmat Grozny

Senior career*
Years	Team	Apps	(Gls)
2010–2013	Neftçi Baku	1	(0)
2013	→ Sumgayit (loan)	9	(0)
2014–2015	Shuvalan	39	(2)
2015–2017	Kapaz	69	(9)
2018	Sabail	13	(0)
2018–2020	Sabah	32	(0)
2020–2021	Zira	2	(0)
2021–2022	Shamakhi	8	(0)

International career^{‡}
2011	Azerbaijan U19	3	(0)
- * Club domestic league appearances and goals as of 2 January 2023 ‡ National team caps and goals as of 20 September 2020

Karim Diniyev (Azerbaijani: Karim Diniyev, born on 5 September 1993) is an Azerbaijani footballer who last played as a defender for Shamakhi FK in the Azerbaijan Premier League.

== Club career ==
Diniyev made his debut in the Azerbaijan Premier League for Keşla on 5 May 2012, in a match against Sumgayit.

On 18 July 2020, Diniyev signed a one-year contract with Zira FK.

== Personal life ==
Diniyev's father, Shahin Diniyev, is the current manager, for whom his elder brother Joshgun Diniyev also plays for Sabah FC.

== Honours ==
Neftçi

- Azerbaijan Premier League (1): 2011–12
