= 2016–17 Kapaz PFK season =

Kapaz
2016–17 season
- President: Mehman Allahverdiyev
- Manager: Shahin Diniyev
- Stadium: Ganja City Stadium
- Premier League: 5th
- Azerbaijan Cup: Quarterfinal vs Inter Baku
- Europa League: Second qualifying round vs Admira Wacker Mödling
- Top goalscorer: League: Julien Ebah (6); All: Julien Ebah (6)

The Kapaz PFK 2016–17 season was Kapaz's fifth Azerbaijan Premier League season, and eighth season since their reformation in 2009. It is their second season with Shahin Diniyev as manager, during which they finished the season fifth, were knocked out of the Azerbaijan Cup by Inter Baku at the Quarterfinal stage and reached the Second qualifying round of the UEFA Europa League before defeat to Admira Wacker Mödling.

== Squad ==
As of 27 January 2017

Note: Flags indicate national team as defined under FIFA eligibility rules; some limited exceptions apply. Players may hold more than one non-FIFA nationality.

No.	Pos.	Nation	Player
1	GK	AZE	Eyyub Aliyev
5	DF	AZE	Karim Diniyev
6	MF	AZE	Jeyhun Javadov
7	DF	AZE	Vugar Beybalayev
9	FW	AZE	Tural Gurbatov
10	FW	BRA	Dário
13	MF	AZE	Shahriyar Rahimov (vice-captain)
14	FW	AZE	Farid Mammadov
15	DF	AZE	Azad Karimov
17	MF	AZE	Nijat Gurbanov
18	DF	AZE	Tural Akhundov (captain)
19	FW	AZE	Orkhan Aliyev
20	MF	AZE	Maharram Huseynov

No.	Pos.	Nation	Player
21	DF	AZE	Novruz Mammadov
23	DF	AZE	Tural Narimanov
25	DF	AZE	Shahriyar Aliyev (loan from Qarabağ)
30	GK	AZE	Davud Karimi
36	DF	BRA	Renan
68	MF	AZE	Ali Nuri
77	FW	POR	Serginho
80	MF	AZE	Tural Rzayev
88	GK	LTU	Tadas Simaitis
90	FW	CMR	Julien Ebah
94	MF	AZE	Sahib Abbasov
98	DF	AZE	Eljan Rahimov
99	MF	AZE	Ali Samadov

== Transfers ==
=== Summer ===
In: Note: Flags indicate national team as defined under FIFA eligibility rules; some limited exceptions apply. Players may hold more than one non-FIFA nationality.

No.	Pos.	Nation	Player
7	DF	AZE	Vugar Beybalayev (from (Azerbaijan) Khazar Lankaran)
9	FW	AZE	Tural Gurbatov (from (Azerbaijan) Inter Baku)
17	MF	AZE	Nijat Gurbanov (from (Azerbaijan) Zira)
21	DF	AZE	Novruz Mammadov (from (Azerbaijan) Ravan Baku)
36	DF	BRA	Renan (from (Portugal) Gil Vicente)
77	FW	POR	Serginho (from (Portugal) Trofense)
30	GK	AZE	Davud Karimi (from (Azerbaijan) Ağsu)

Out: Note: Flags indicate national team as defined under FIFA eligibility rules; some limited exceptions apply. Players may hold more than one non-FIFA nationality.

No.	Pos.	Nation	Player
3	DF	AZE	Tarlan Guliyev (loan return to (Azerbaijan) Qarabağ)
4	MF	AZE	Elvin Jabrayilli
7	MF	BRA	Juninho
8	MF	AZE	Budag Nasirov (loan return to (Azerbaijan) Sumgayit)
9	MF	AZE	Namig Alasgarov (loan return to (Azerbaijan) Qarabağ)
21	DF	AZE	Khazar Garibov
27	FW	AZE	Bakhtiyar Soltanov (to (Azerbaijan) Qaradağ Lökbatan)

=== Winter ===
In: Note: Flags indicate national team as defined under FIFA eligibility rules; some limited exceptions apply. Players may hold more than one non-FIFA nationality.

No.	Pos.	Nation	Player
68	MF	AZE	Ali Nuri
94	MF	AZE	Sahib Abbasov (from (Azerbaijan) Shamkir)

Out: Note: Flags indicate national team as defined under FIFA eligibility rules; some limited exceptions apply. Players may hold more than one non-FIFA nationality.

No.	Pos.	Nation	Player

== Competitions ==
=== Azerbaijan Premier League ===
==== Results summary ====
Overall								Home						Away					
Pld	W	D	L	GF	GA	GD	Pts	W	D	L	GF	GA	GD	W	D	L	GF	GA	GD
28	9	9	10	21	25	−4	36	7	6	1	11	2	+9	2	3	9	10	23	−13

Last updated: 29 April 2017.
Source: See Results

==== Results ====
8 August 2016 1	Gabala	2 – 0	Kapaz	Baku
19:00 AZT (UTC+4)	Abbasov (yellow card) 48'; T.Mütallimov (yellow card) 52' (goal) 58'; E.Jamalov (yellow card) 58'; Dabo 79'	Report	Ebah (yellow card) 29'	Stadium: Dalga Arena; Attendance: 300; Referee: Fariz Yusifov

13 August 2016 2	Kapaz	0 – 0	AZAL	Ganja
17:00 AZT (UTC+4)	K.Diniyev (yellow card) 53'; Renan (yellow card) 76'	Report	Coronado (yellow card) 32'	Stadium: Ganja City Stadium; Attendance: 5,000; Referee: Aliyar Ağayev

19 August 2016 3	Inter Baku	2 – 2	Kapaz	Baku
21:00 AZT (UTC+4)	F.Bayramov (yellow card) 19'; Scarlatache 24'; Khizanishvili (yellow card) 27'; Aghayev (yellow card) 43'; Aliyev (yellow card) 45+2'; Qirtimov (yellow card) 77'; Abışov 90'; S.Zargarov (yellow card) 90+3'	Report	Serginho (yellow card) 23'; T.Akhundov 28' (pen.); Ebah 73'; S.Aliyev (yellow card) 89'	Stadium: Inter Arena; Attendance: 500; Referee: Omar Paşayev

11 September 2016 4	Kapaz	2 – 0	Zira	Ganja
16:00 AZT (UTC+4)	Ebah 8'; Serginho (yellow card) 55'; S.Rahimov 78'	Report	Mustafayev (yellow card) 31'; Taghiyev (yellow card) 42'; Krneta (yellow card) 49'; T.Khalilzade (yellow card) 55'; K.Bayramov (yellow card) 57'	Stadium: Ganja City Stadium; Attendance: 10,000; Referee: Ramil Diniyev

18 September 2016 5	Kapaz	1 – 1	Sumgayit	Ganja
18:00 AZT (UTC+4)	Javadov 69'; Abednezhad (yellow card) 71'; Y.Nabiyev (yellow card) 74'	Report	Renan (yellow card) 40'; Serginho (yellow card) 56'; K.Diniyev 73'; T.Akhundov (yellow card) 85'	Stadium: Ganja City Stadium; Attendance: 1,320; Referee: Rahim Həsənov

25 September 2016 6	Kapaz	1 – 1	Qarabağ	Ganja
15:30 AZT (UTC+4)	Serginho (yellow card) 31'; V.Beybalayev (yellow card) 38'; Dário 54'	Report	Medvedev (yellow card) 21'; Reynaldo 75'; Míchel (yellow card) 82'; Richard (yellow card) 86'	Stadium: Ganja City Stadium; Attendance: 14,238; Referee: Rahim Həsənov

1 October 2016 7	Neftchi Baku	2 – 0	Kapaz	Masazır
19:00 AZT (UTC+4)	Denílson 14'; Țîră (yellow card) 31' (goal) 90+2'	Report	A.Karimov (yellow card) 30'; N.Gurbanov (yellow card) 42'; V.Beybalayev (yellow card) 54'; S.Rahimov (yellow card) 65'	Stadium: Alinja Arena; Attendance: 900; Referee: Omar Paşayev

16 October 2016 8	AZAL	0 – 1	Kapaz	Baku
16:00 AZT (UTC+4)	K.Mirzayev (yellow card) 5'	Report	J.Javadov (yellow card) 15'; Ebah 83'	Stadium: AZAL Arena; Attendance: 300; Referee: Orkhan Məmmədov

23 October 2016 9	Kapaz	0 – 0	Inter Baku	Ganja
14:30 AZT (UTC+4)	Renan (yellow card) 8'; Ebah (yellow card) 36'	Report	E.Abdullayev (yellow card) 35'; Ramazanov (yellow card) 64'; Denis (yellow card) 71'; Guliyev (yellow card) 78'; S.Alkhasov (yellow card) 82'; Fardjad-Azad (yellow card) 88'	Stadium: Ganja City Stadium; Attendance: 10,650; Referee: Fariz Yusifov

30 October 2016 10	Zira	2 – 0	Kapaz	Zirə
14:00 AZT (UTC+4)	Mustafayev (yellow card) 40'; T.Khalilzade (yellow card) 45+1'; Taghiyev 69'; Mammadov 82' (pen.)	Report	T.Akhundov (yellow card) 21' (yellow-red card) 70'; Renan (yellow card) 29'; A.Karimov (yellow card) 66'; N.Gurbanov (yellow card) 75'; Serginho (yellow card) 88'	Stadium: Zira Olympic Sport Complex Stadium; Attendance: 500; Referee: Ingilab Məmmədov

5 November 2016 11	Kapaz	0 – 0	Sumgayit	Ganja
13:30 AZT (UTC+4)	J.Javadov (yellow card) 24'; K.Diniyev (yellow card) 30' (yellow-red card) 62'	Report	Yunanov (yellow card) 65'	Stadium: Ganja City Stadium; Attendance: 5,000; Referee: Aliyar Ağayev

19 November 2016 12	Qarabağ	1 – 0	Kapaz	Baku
18:00 AZT (UTC+4)	Ndlovu 17'; Quintana (yellow card) 32'; Yunuszade (yellow card) 37'; Medvedev (yellow card) 61'; Garayev (yellow card) 73'	Report	N.Gurbanov (yellow card) 25'; Renan (yellow card) 70'	Stadium: Azersun Arena; Attendance: 600; Referee: Fariz Yusifov

27 November 2016 13	Kapaz	2 – 0	Neftchi Baku	Ganja
14:00 AZT (UTC+4)	O.Aliyev 27'; K.Diniyev (yellow card) 45+1'; Ebah 49'	Report	Hajiyev (yellow card) 64'	Stadium: Ganja City Stadium; Attendance: 8,350; Referee: Omar Paşayev

17 December 2016 14	Gabala	2 – 1	Kapaz	Qabala
14:00 AZT (UTC+4)	Ozobić 23' (pen.); Santos (yellow card) 51'; Stanković (yellow card) 75'; Qurbanov 83' (pen.)	Report	Renan (yellow card) 22' (yellow-red card) 82'; T.Akhundov 77' (pen.)	Stadium: Gabala City Stadium; Attendance: 1,000; Referee: Aliyar Ağayev

28 January 2017 15	Inter Baku	4 – 1	Kapaz	Baku
17:00 AZT (UTC+4)	F.Bayramov (yellow card) 43' (goal) 53'; Hajiyev 45+2'; A.Huseynov 60'; E.Abdullayev (yellow card) 65'; Aliyev 79'	Report	T.Akhundov (yellow card) 25' (goal) 39'	Stadium: Inter Arena; Attendance: 300; Referee: Rahim Həsənov

4 February 2017 16	Zira	1 – 0	Kapaz	Zirə
14:00 AZT (UTC+4)	Meza (red card) 28'; Latifu (yellow card) 34'; N.Novruzov 37' (yellow card) 43'; Krneta (yellow card) 80'; Nazirov (yellow card) 81'; Mammadov (yellow card) 86'	Report	V.Beybalayev (yellow card) 18'; Renan (yellow card) 23' (red card) 90+3'; Serginho (yellow card) 39'; T.Gurbatov (yellow card) 80'	Stadium: Zira Olympic Sport Complex Stadium; Attendance: 900; Referee: Elvin Əsgərov

9 February 2017 17	Sumgayit	3 – 1	Kapaz	Sumqayit
15:00 AZT (UTC+4)	Chernyshev 7'; A.Salahli 29'; N.Mukhtarov (yellow card) 45'; X.Najafov (yellow card) 59'; Kurbanov 61'	Report	N.Mammadov (yellow card) 67'; K.Diniyev 71' (yellow card) 71'; S.Rahimov (yellow card) 79'	Stadium: Kapital Bank Arena; Attendance: 1,200; Referee: Rahim Həsənov

12 February 2017 18	Kapaz	0 – 1	Qarabağ	Ganja
14:30 AZT (UTC+4)		Report	M.Madatov 65'; Ramazanov (yellow card) 86'	Stadium: Ganja City Stadium; Attendance: 2,000; Referee: Omar Paşayev

18 February 2017 19	Neftchi Baku	0 – 0	Kapaz	Baku
18:00 AZT (UTC+4)	Navalovski (yellow card) 90+2'	Report	S.Rahimov (yellow card) 24'; S.Aliyev (yellow card) 90+1'	Stadium: Bakcell Arena; Attendance: 2,500; Referee: Rauf Jabbarov

28 February 2017 20	Kapaz	1 – 1	Gabala	Ganja
15:00 AZT (UTC+4)	S.Rahimov 36'; N.Gurbanov (red card) 38'; Dário (yellow card) 85'; D.Karimi (yellow card) 90'	Report	Kvekveskiri (red card) 38'; Renan 54' (o.g.); Huseynov (yellow card) 64'	Stadium: Ganja City Stadium; Attendance: 5,000; Referee: Aliyar Ağayev

5 March 2017 21	Kapaz	1 – 1	AZAL	Ganja
15:00 AZT (UTC+4)	S.Aliyev 39'; Dário (yellow card) 69'; J.Javadov (yellow card) 90+1'	Report	Amirjanov (yellow card) 51'; Javadov 90'	Stadium: Ganja City Stadium; Attendance: 6,200; Referee: Orkhan Məmmədov

13 March 2017 22	Kapaz	1 – 0	Zira	Ganja
15:00 AZT (UTC+4)	T.Akhundov (yellow card) 43'; Ebah 55'; Serginho (yellow card) 78'	Report	T.Khalilzade (yellow card) 20'; Đurić (yellow card) 23'	Stadium: Ganja City Stadium; Attendance: 6,200; Referee: Fariz Yusifov

18 March 2017 23	Kapaz	1 – 0	Sumgayit	Ganja
16:00 AZT (UTC+4)	S.Rahimov (yellow card) 29'; Dário 45'; Renan (yellow card) 72'	Report	Gystarov (yellow card) 30'; Hüseynov (yellow card) 90+4'	Stadium: Ganja City Stadium; Attendance: 7,200; Referee: Ingilab Məmmədov

2 April 2017 24	Qarabağ	2 – 1	Kapaz	Baku
19:30 AZT (UTC+4)	Ndlovu 42'; Míchel 47'; Medvedev (yellow card) 90'	Report	K.Diniyev 26'	Stadium: Tofiq Bahramov Republican Stadium; Attendance: 500; Referee: Rauf Jabbarov

9 April 2017 25	Kapaz	2 – 0	Neftchi Baku	Ganja
17:00 AZT (UTC+4)	T.Akhundov 14' (pen.), 42' (pen.)	Report	M.Isayev (yellow card) 11'; Shukurov (yellow card) 81'	Stadium: Ganja City Stadium; Attendance: 10,000; Referee: Elvin Asgərov

16 April 2017 26	Kapaz	2 – 0	Gabala	Ganja
16:00 AZT (UTC+4)	Dário (yellow card) 21' (goal) 90+3'; Ebah 70'; V.Beybalayev (yellow card) 80'	Report	Ricardinho (yellow card) 41'; Ramaldanov (yellow card) 77'	Stadium: Ganja City Stadium; Attendance: 12,500; Referee: Omar Pashayev

23 April 2017 27	AZAL	1 – 2	Kapaz	Baku
18:00 AZT (UTC+4)	Madou 82'	Report	Serginho 37', 43'; J.Javadov (yellow card) 38'	Stadium: AZAL Arena; Attendance: 330; Referee: Ravan Həmzəzadə

29 April 2017 28	Kapaz	1 – 0	Inter Baku	Ganja
17:00 AZT (UTC+4)	Dário 50'; D.Karimi (yellow card) 51'; T.Akhundov (yellow card) 53'; Ebah (yellow card) 66'; S.Aliyev (yellow card) 70'	Report	Aliyev (yellow card) 51'; E.Abdullayev (yellow card) 54'; M.Guliyev (yellow card) 90'	Stadium: Ganja City Stadium; Attendance: 11,000; Referee: Rahim Həsənov

==== League table ====
Pos	Team	Pld	W	D	L	GF	GA	GD	Pts	Qualification or relegation
3	Inter Baku	28	11	10	7	39	33	+6	43	Qualification for the Europa League first qualifying round
4	Zira	28	10	9	9	29	26	+3	39	Qualification for the Europa League first qualifying round
5	Kapaz	28	9	9	10	24	27	−3	36	
6	Sumgayit	28	9	8	11	28	35	−7	35	
7	Neftçi Baku	28	9	2	17	24	45	−21	29	

Source: PFL (in Azerbaijani), UEFA, Soccerway
Rules for classification: 1) Points; 2) Head-to-head points; 3) Head-to-head goal difference; 4) Head-to-head goals scored; 5) Head-to-head away goals scored (only if two teams); 6) Goal difference; 7) Goals scored.

=== Azerbaijan Cup ===
3 December 2016 Second Round	Shahdag Qusar	1 – 5	Kapaz	Qusar
13:00 AZT (UTC+4)	A.Alimammadov (yellow card) 2'; E.Yahyabayov (yellow card) 13'; F.Aghalarov (yellow card) 54'; H.Hasanov 78'	Report	O.Aliyev 10'; S.Rahimov 12'; T.Gurbatov 31'; T.Rzayev 51' (yellow card) 54'; J.Javadov 87'	Stadium: Shovkat Ordukhanov Stadium; Attendance: 150; Referee: Ravan Həmzəzadə

13 December 2016 Quarterfinal First Leg	Inter Baku	2 – 0	Kapaz	Baku
17:00 AZT (UTC+4)	Qirtimov (yellow card) 21'; Guliyev (yellow card) 32'; Aliyev 58'; Hajiyev 61'; F.Bayramov (yellow card) 63'	Report	S.Rahimov (yellow card) 13'; N.Gurbanov (yellow card) 75'; Renan (yellow card) 78'	Stadium: Inter Arena; Attendance: 500; Referee: Rahim Hasanov

21 December 2016 Quarterfinal Second Leg	Kapaz	0 – 0 (0 – 2 agg.)	Inter Baku	Ganja
13:00 AZT (UTC+4)	N.Mammadov (yellow card) 24'; O.Aliyev (yellow card) 66'; Renan (yellow card) 88'	Report	F.Bayramov (yellow card) 36'; S.Zargarov (yellow card) 59'	Stadium: Ganja City Stadium; Attendance: 5,500

=== UEFA Europa League ===
==== Qualifying rounds ====
28 June 2016 First qualifying round 1st leg	Kapaz (Azerbaijan)	0 – 0	(Moldova) Dacia Chișinău	Baku, (Note: Kapaz will play their home match at Dalga Arena, Baku, instead of their regular stadium City Stadium, Ganja.) Azerbaijan
20:00 AZT (UTC+4)		Report	Cociuc (yellow card) 77'; Bulgaru (yellow card) 90+3'	Stadium: Dalga Arena; Attendance: 2,000; Referee: Aleksandr Gauzer (Kazakhstan)

7 July 2016 First qualifying round 2nd leg	Dacia Chișinău (Moldova)	0 – 1 (0 – 1 agg.)	(Azerbaijan) Kapaz	Speia, Moldova
19:00 AZT (UTC+4)	Mani (yellow card) 21'; Bulgaru (yellow card) 49'	Report	Serginho (yellow card) 30'; Dário 57'	Stadium: Stadionul Moldova; Attendance: 620; Referee: Lasha Silagava (Georgia)

14 July 2016 Second qualifying round 1st leg	Admira Wacker Mödling (Austria)	1 – 0	(Azerbaijan) Kapaz	Sankt Pölten (Note: Admira Wacker Mödling play their home matches at NV Arena, Sankt Pölten, instead of their regular stadium Bundesstadion Südstadt, Maria Enzersdorf.), Austria
21:00 AZT (UTC+4)	Starkl 41' (yellow card) 69'; Ebner (yellow card) 43'	Report		Stadium: NV Arena; Attendance: 956; Referee: Pavle Radovanović (Montenegro)

21 July 2016 Second qualifying round 2nd leg	Kapaz (Azerbaijan)	0 – 2 (0 – 3 agg.)	(Austria) Admira Wacker Mödling	Baku, Azerbaijan
20:00 AZT (UTC+4)	T.Akhundov (yellow card) 11'; Renan (yellow card) 90+1'	Report	Knasmüllner 17'; Zwierschitz (yellow card) 24'; Lackner (yellow card) 58'; Toth (yellow card) 69'; Schmidt 76'	Stadium: Dalga Arena; Referee: Vitali Meshkov (Russia)

== Squad statistics ==
As of Match played 29 April 2017

=== Appearances and goals ===
No.	Pos	Nat	Player	Total		Premier League		Azerbaijan Cup		Europa League	
No.	Pos	Nat	Player	Apps	Goals	Apps	Goals	Apps	Goals	Apps	Goals
1	GK	(Azerbaijan) AZE	Eyyub Aliyev	1	0	0	0	1	0	0	0
4	MF	(Azerbaijan) AZE	Qaraxan Aliyev	1	0	0	0	0+1	0	0	0
5	DF	(Azerbaijan) AZE	Karim Diniyev	33	3	26	3	3	0	4	0
6	MF	(Azerbaijan) AZE	Jeyhun Javadov	25	1	7+11	0	2+1	1	0+4	0
7	DF	(Azerbaijan) AZE	Vugar Beybalayev	25	0	9+10	0	2	0	4	0
8	DF	(Azerbaijan) AZE	Elcan Rəhimov	1	0	0+1	0	0	0	0	0
9	FW	(Azerbaijan) AZE	Tural Gurbatov	21	1	4+10	0	1+2	1	0+4	0
10	FW	(Brazil) BRA	Dário	27	5	20+2	4	0+1	0	4	1
13	MF	(Azerbaijan) AZE	Shahriyar Rahimov	34	3	27	2	3	1	4	0
14	FW	(Azerbaijan) AZE	Farid Mammadov	1	0	0	0	0+1	0	0	0
15	DF	(Azerbaijan) AZE	Azad Karimov	23	0	12+9	0	1	0	0+1	0
16	MF	(Azerbaijan) AZE	Emin Zamanov	1	0	0+1	0	0	0	0	0
17	MF	(Azerbaijan) AZE	Nijat Gurbanov	29	0	12+10	0	2+1	0	4	0
18	DF	(Azerbaijan) AZE	Tural Akhundov	30	5	25	5	1	0	4	0
19	FW	(Azerbaijan) AZE	Orkhan Aliyev	33	2	27	1	3	1	0+3	0
21	DF	(Azerbaijan) AZE	Novruz Mammadov	22	0	16+4	0	2	0	0	0
23	DF	(Azerbaijan) AZE	Tural Narimanov	6	0	3+1	0	2	0	0	0
25	DF	(Azerbaijan) AZE	Shahriyar Aliyev	21	1	17	1	0	0	4	0
30	GK	(Azerbaijan) AZE	Davud Karimi	11	0	11	0	0	0	0	0
36	DF	(Brazil) BRA	Renan	30	0	24	0	2	0	4	0
68	MF	(Azerbaijan) AZE	Ali Nuri	2	0	1+1	0	0	0	0	0
77	FW	(Portugal) POR	Serginho	33	2	25+2	2	2	0	4	0
80	MF	(Azerbaijan) AZE	Tural Rzayev	19	1	0+16	0	2+1	1	0	0
88	GK	(Lithuania) LTU	Tadas Simaitis	23	0	17	0	2	0	4	0
90	FW	(Cameroon) CMR	Julien Ebah	34	6	25+3	6	2	0	4	0
99	MF	(Azerbaijan) AZE	Ali Samadov	2	0	0+1	0	0+1	0	0	0
Players who appeared for Kapaz but left during the season:

=== Goal scorers ===
Place	Position	Nation	Number	Name	Premier League	Azerbaijan Cup	Europa League	Total
1	FW	(Cameroon)	90	Julien Ebah	6	0	0	6
2	DF	(Azerbaijan)	18	Tural Akhundov	5	0	0	5
2	FW	(Brazil)	10	Dário	4	0	1	5
4	DF	(Azerbaijan)	5	Karim Diniyev	3	0	0	3
4	MF	(Azerbaijan)	13	Shahriyar Rahimov	2	1	0	3
6	FW	(Portugal)	77	Serginho	2	0	0	2
6	FW	(Azerbaijan)	19	Orkhan Aliyev	1	1	0	2
8	DF	(Azerbaijan)	25	Shahriyar Aliyev	1	0	0	1
8	MF	(Azerbaijan)	6	Jeyhun Javadov	0	1	0	1
8	MF	(Azerbaijan)	80	Tural Rzayev	0	1	0	1
8	FW	(Azerbaijan)	9	Tural Gurbatov	0	1	0	1
				TOTALS	25	5	1	31

=== Disciplinary record ===
Number	Nation	Position	Name	Premier League		Azerbaijan Cup		Europa League		Total	
Number	Nation	Position	Name	Yellow card	Red card	Yellow card	Red card	Yellow card	Red card	Yellow card	Red card
5	(Azerbaijan)	DF	Karim Diniyev	5	1	0	0	0	0	5	1
6	(Azerbaijan)	MF	Jeyhun Javadov	4	0	0	0	0	0	4	0
7	(Azerbaijan)	DF	Vugar Beybalayev	4	0	0	0	0	0	4	0
9	(Azerbaijan)	FW	Tural Gurbatov	1	0	0	0	0	0	1	0
10	(Brazil)	FW	Dário	3	0	0	0	0	0	3	0
13	(Azerbaijan)	MF	Shahriyar Rahimov	4	0	1	0	0	0	5	0
15	(Azerbaijan)	MF	Azad Karimov	2	0	0	0	0	0	2	0
17	(Azerbaijan)	MF	Nijat Gurbanov	3	1	1	0	0	0	4	1
18	(Azerbaijan)	DF	Tural Akhundov	6	1	0	0	1	0	7	1
19	(Azerbaijan)	FW	Orkhan Aliyev	0	0	1	0	0	0	1	0
21	(Azerbaijan)	DF	Novruz Mammadov	1	0	1	0	0	0	2	0
25	(Azerbaijan)	DF	Shahriyar Aliyev	3	0	0	0	0	0	3	0
30	(Azerbaijan)	GK	Davud Karimi	2	0	0	0	0	0	2	0
36	(Brazil)	DF	Renan	9	2	2	0	1	0	12	2
77	(Portugal)	FW	Serginho	7	0	0	0	1	0	8	0
80	(Azerbaijan)	MF	Tural Rzayev	0	0	1	0	0	0	1	0
90	(Cameroon)	FW	Julien Ebah	3	0	0	0	0	0	3	0
			TOTALS	57	4	7	0	3	0	67	4
