= 2016–17 Sumgayit FK season =

Sumgayit
2016-17 season
- President: Kamran Guliyev
- Manager: Samir Abbasov
- Stadium: Kapital Bank Arena
- Premier League: 4th
- Azerbaijan Cup: Quarterfinal vs Qarabağ
- Top goalscorer: League: Mirabdulla Abbasov (4); All: Amil Yunanov (5)

The Sumgayit FK 2016-17 season is Sumgayit's sixth Azerbaijan Premier League season, and seventh season in their history. It is their first full season with Samir Abbasov as manager, during which they will participate in the Azerbaijan Cup as well as the League.

== Squad ==
As of match played 29 April 2017

| No. | Name | Nationality | Position | Date of birth (age) | Signed from | Signed in | Contract ends | Apps. | Goals |
Goalkeepers
| 1 | Farhad Valiyev | (Azerbaijan) | GK | 1 November 1980 (aged 36) | Qarabağ | 2016 | | 29 | 0 |
| 92 | Mehdi Jannatov | (Russia) | GK | 26 January 1992 (aged 25) | Anzhi Makhachkala | 2017 | | 0 | 0 |
| 94 | Tarlan Ahmadli | (Azerbaijan) | GK | 21 November 1994 (aged 22) | Ravan Baku | 2012 | | 15 | 0 |
Defenders
| 2 | Rail Malikov | (Azerbaijan) | DF | 18 December 1985 (aged 31) | AZAL | 2016 | | 26 | 0 |
| 3 | Vurğun Hüseynov | (Azerbaijan) | DF | 25 April 1988 (aged 29) | Gabala | 2013 | | 116 | 0 |
| 13 | Bahlul Mustafazade | (Azerbaijan) | DF | 27 February 1997 (aged 20) | loan from Gabala | 2017 | | 4 | 0 |
| 14 | Bakhtiyar Hasanalizade | (Azerbaijan) | DF | 29 December 1992 (aged 24) | Trainee | 2011 | | 127 | 2 |
| 17 | Vaguf Gulaliyev | (Azerbaijan) | DF | 11 May 1993 (aged 23) | Khazar Lankaran | 2016 | | 2 | 0 |
| 19 | Azer Salahli | (Azerbaijan) | DF | 11 April 1994 (aged 23) | loan from Qarabağ | 2016 | | 31 | 1 |
| 74 | Yusif Nabiyev | (Azerbaijan) | DF | 3 September 1997 (aged 19) | loan from Gabala | 2016 | | 18 | 3 |
Midfielders
| 5 | Seymur Asadov | (Azerbaijan) | MF | 5 May 1994 (aged 22) | | 2016 | | 15 | 1 |
| 6 | Mikayil Rahimov | (Azerbaijan) | MF | 11 May 1987 (aged 29) | FC Baku | 2015 | | 10 | 2 |
| 7 | Sergey Chernyshev | (Russia) | MF | 27 April 1990 (aged 27) | Druzhba Maykop | 2017 | | 9 | 1 |
| 8 | Nijat Mukhtarov | (Azerbaijan) | MF | 1 June 1995 (aged 21) | Ravan Baku | 2016 | | 38 | 1 |
| 18 | Suleyman Ahmadov | (Azerbaijan) | MF | 25 November 1999 (aged 17) | Inter Baku | 2016 | | 5 | 0 |
| 20 | Farkhad Gystarov | (Russia) | MF | 21 November 1994 (aged 22) | SKA Rostov-on-Don | 2017 | | 8 | 0 |
| 21 | Nasyr Abilayev | (Russia) | MF | 19 November 1995 (aged 21) | Khimki-M | 2017 | | 8 | 0 |
| 25 | Ayaz Mehdiyev | (Azerbaijan) | MF | 22 February 1993 (aged 24) | Giresunspor | 2015 | | 28 | 0 |
| 42 | Kamran Abdullazade | (Azerbaijan) | MF | 20 March 1995 (aged 22) | Khazar Lankaran | 2016 | | 12 | 0 |
| 77 | Ehtiram Shahverdiyev | (Azerbaijan) | DF | 1 October 1996 (aged 20) | loan from Gabala | 2017 | | 12 | 0 |
| 97 | Khayal Najafov | (Azerbaijan) | MF | 19 December 1997 (aged 19) | Trainee | 2014 | | 37 | 1 |
Forwards
| 9 | Amil Yunanov | (Azerbaijan) | FW | 6 January 1993 (aged 24) | Ravan Baku | 2015 | | 52 | 21 |
| 14 | Magomed Kurbanov | (Azerbaijan) | FW | 11 April 1992 (aged 25) | Taganrog | 2014 | | 69 | 21 |
| 22 | Mirabdulla Abbasov | (Azerbaijan) | FW | 27 April 1995 (aged 22) | loan from Neftchi Baku | 2016 | | 30 | 8 |
Left during the season
| 7 | Vagif Javadov | (Azerbaijan) | FW | 25 May 1989 (aged 27) | Khazar Lankaran | 2015 | | 32 | 6 |
| 11 | Ebrahim Abednezhad | (Iran) | MF | 22 August 1992 (aged 24) | Tractor Sazi | 2016 | | 5 | 0 |
| 24 | Amit Guluzade | (Azerbaijan) | MF | 20 November 1992 (aged 24) | Atlético CP | 2015 | | 40 | 1 |
| 66 | Afshin Esmaeilzadeh | (Iran) | MF | 21 April 1992 (aged 25) | Giti Pasand | 2016 | | 10 | 0 |

== Transfers ==
=== Summer ===
In: Note: Flags indicate national team as defined under FIFA eligibility rules; some limited exceptions apply. Players may hold more than one non-FIFA nationality.

| No. | Pos. | Nation | Player |
|---|---|---|---|
| 1 | GK | AZE | Farhad Valiyev (from (Azerbaijan) Qarabağ) |
| 2 | DF | AZE | Rail Malikov (from (Azerbaijan) AZAL) |
| 5 | MF | AZE | Seymur Asadov (from (Azerbaijan) AZAL) |
| 10 | FW | AZE | Magomed Kurbanov (loan return from (Azerbaijan) Neftçi Baku) |
| 11 | MF | IRI | Afshin Esmaeilzadeh (from (Iran) Giti Pasand Isfahan) |
| 13 | GK | AZE | Ali Hasanli (from (Azerbaijan) Neftchala) |
| 17 | DF | AZE | Vaguf Gulaliyev (from (Azerbaijan) Khazar Lankaran) |
| 19 | DF | AZE | Azer Salahli (loan from (Azerbaijan) Qarabağ) |
| 21 | MF | RUS | Nasyr Abilayev |
| 22 | FW | AZE | Mirabdulla Abbasov (loan from (Azerbaijan) Neftçi Baku) |
| 42 | MF | AZE | Kamran Abdullazade (from (Azerbaijan) Khazar Lankaran) |
| 66 | MF | IRI | Ebrahim Abednezhad (from (Iran) Tractor Sazi) |
| 74 | DF | AZE | Yusif Nabiyev (loan from (Azerbaijan) Gabala) |

Out: Note: Flags indicate national team as defined under FIFA eligibility rules; some limited exceptions apply. Players may hold more than one non-FIFA nationality.

| No. | Pos. | Nation | Player |
|---|---|---|---|
| 1 | GK | AZE | Salahat Aghayev (to (Azerbaijan) Inter Baku) |
| 2 | DF | AZE | Slavik Alkhasov (to (Azerbaijan) Inter Baku) |
| 5 | DF | AZE | Jamil Hajiyev (to (Azerbaijan) Zira) |
| 7 | FW | AZE | Pardis Fardjad-Azad (to (Azerbaijan) Inter Baku) |
| 9 | MF | AZE | Ali Alimardanli |
| 10 | MF | AZE | Uğur Pamuk (to (Turkey) Manisaspor) |
| 12 | GK | AZE | Tural Abbaszade |
| 13 | MF | AZE | Murad Agayev (to (Azerbaijan) Neftchi Baku) |
| 15 | DF | AZE | Rijat Garayev (to (Azerbaijan) Inter Baku) |
| 16 | MF | AZE | Kanan Manafov |
| 18 | MF | AZE | Aleksandr Chertoganov |
| 22 | MF | AZE | Tofig Mikayilov |
| 23 | MF | AZE | Tural Rzayev |
| 55 | FW | AZE | Aghabala Ramazanov (to (Azerbaijan) Inter Baku) |
| 99 | DF | AZE | Rasim Ramaldanov (to (Georgia (country)) Kolkheti-1913) |
| — | MF | AZE | Budag Nasirov (loan to (Portugal) Sporting CP, previously on loan to (Azerbaijan) Kapaz) |

=== Winter ===
In: Note: Flags indicate national team as defined under FIFA eligibility rules; some limited exceptions apply. Players may hold more than one non-FIFA nationality.

| No. | Pos. | Nation | Player |
|---|---|---|---|
| 7 | MF | AZE | Sergey Chernyshev (from (Russia) Druzhba Maykop) |
| 13 | DF | AZE | Bahlul Mustafazade (loan from (Azerbaijan) Gabala) |
| 20 | MF | RUS | Farkhad Gystarov (from (Russia) SKA Rostov-on-Don) |
| 77 | MF | AZE | Ehtiram Shahverdiyev (loan from (Azerbaijan) Gabala) |
| 92 | GK | RUS | Mehdi Jannatov (from (Russia) Anzhi Makhachkala) |

Out: Note: Flags indicate national team as defined under FIFA eligibility rules; some limited exceptions apply. Players may hold more than one non-FIFA nationality.

| No. | Pos. | Nation | Player |
|---|---|---|---|
| 7 | FW | AZE | Vagif Javadov (to (Azerbaijan) AZAL) |
| 11 | MF | IRI | Afshin Esmaeilzadeh |
| 13 | GK | AZE | Ali Hasanli |
| 24 | MF | AZE | Amit Guluzade (to (Greece) Athlitiki Enosi Larissa) |
| 66 | MF | IRI | Ebrahim Abednezhad |

== Friendlies ==
| 13 January 2017 | Skënderbeu Korçë (Albania) | 3 – 1 | (Azerbaijan) Sumgayit | Antalya, Turkey |
| 18:00 AZT (UTC+4) | Salihi 20'; Karimi 80'; Orelesi 82' | Report | Abbasov 90' | Stadium: Stadium of the "Titanic De Luxe Beach & Resort Hotel Antalya", Lara |

| 16 January 2017 | Nasaf Qarshi (Uzbekistan) | 1 – 0 | (Azerbaijan) Sumgayit | Antalya, Turkey |
| 16:30 AZT (UTC+4) | Goal | Report | | Stadium: Stadium of "The Sense De Luxe Hotel", Side |

| 19 January 2017 | Atyrau (Kazakhstan) | 2 – 1 | (Azerbaijan) Sumgayit | Antalya, Turkey |
| 17:00 AZT (UTC+4) | 85'; 90+' (pen.) | Report | Kurbanov 33' (pen.) | Stadium: Stadium of "The Sense De Luxe Hotel", Side |

== Competitions ==
=== Azerbaijan Premier League ===
==== Results summary ====
| Overall | | | | | | | | Home | | | | | | Away | | | | | |
| Pld | W | D | L | GF | GA | GD | Pts | W | D | L | GF | GA | GD | W | D | L | GF | GA | GD |
|---|---|---|---|---|---|---|---|---|---|---|---|---|---|---|---|---|---|---|---|
| 28 | 9 | 8 | 11 | 23 | 29 | −6 | 35 | 6 | 4 | 3 | 14 | 11 | +3 | 3 | 4 | 8 | 9 | 18 | −9 |

Last updated: 29 April 2017.
Source: See Results

==== Results ====
| 6 August 2016 1 | Zira | 0 – 1 | Sumgayit | Zirə |
| 20:00 AZT (UTC+4) | Mustafayev (yellow card) 85' | Report | Javadov 75'; Yunanov (yellow card) 79'; Guluzade (yellow card) 86' | Stadium: Zira Olympic Sport Complex Stadium; Attendance: 1,000; Referee: Orkhan Məmmədov |

| 11 August 2016 2 | Sumgayit | 0 – 2 | Qarabağ | Sumqayit |
| 19:00 AZT (UTC+4) | | Report | Muarem 52'; Quintana 84' | Stadium: Kapital Bank Arena; Attendance: 1,320; Referee: Revan Həmzəzadə |

| 21 August 2016 3 | Gabala | – | Sumgayit | Qabala |
| 20:00 AZT (UTC+4) | | [ Report] | | Stadium: Gabala City Stadium |

| 11 September 2016 4 | Sumgayit | 1 – 2 | Inter Baku | Sumqayit |
| 20:30 AZT (UTC+4) | Javadov 90+1' | Report | Denis 2'; Khizanishvili (yellow card) 30'; F.Bayramov (yellow card) 45'; Ramazanov 61'; Hajiyev (yellow card) 90+2' | Stadium: Kapital Bank Arena; Attendance: 1,350; Referee: Aliyar Ağayev |

| 18 September 2016 5 | Kapaz | 1 – 1 | Sumgayit | Ganja |
| 18:00 AZT (UTC+4) | Javadov 69'; Abednezhad (yellow card) 71'; Y.Nabiyev (yellow card) 74' | Report | Renan (yellow card) 40'; Serginho (yellow card) 56'; K.Diniyev 73'; T.Akhundov (yellow card) 85' | Stadium: Ganja City Stadium; Attendance: 1,320; Referee: Rahim Həsənov |

| 22 September 2016 3 | Gabala | 2 – 0 | Sumgayit | Qabala |
| 17:00 AZT (UTC+4) | Dabo 85', 90'; Ozobić (yellow card) 90'; Santos (yellow card) 90+2' | Report | Y.Nabiyev (yellow card) 70' | Stadium: Gabala City Stadium; Attendance: 1,800; Referee: Rauf Jabbarov |

| 27 September 2016 6 | Neftchi Baku | 1 – 2 | Sumgayit | Masazır |
| 19:00 AZT (UTC+4) | Imamverdiyev 6'; Jairo (yellow card) 78' | Report | Y.Nabiyev 19'; S.Asadov 71' | Stadium: Alinja Arena; Attendance: 600; Referee: Ramil Diniyev |

| 1 October 2016 7 | Sumgayit | 1 – 1 | AZAL | Sumqayit |
| 17:00 AZT (UTC+4) | Hüseynov (yellow card) 25'; Abbasov 83'; Javadov (yellow card) 87' | Report | I.Alakbarov 9'; Jafarguliyev (yellow card) 36'; Coronado (yellow card) 66'; E.Suleymanov (yellow card) 78'; A.Mammadov (yellow card) 90' | Stadium: Kapital Bank Arena; Attendance: 1,500; Referee: Ingilab Məmmədov |

| 15 October 2016 8 | Qarabağ | 3 – 0 | Sumgayit | Baku |
| 18:30 AZT (UTC+4) | Reynaldo (yellow card) 24'; Míchel 42'; Gurbanov 44'; Ndlovu 90+3' | Report | Y.Nabiyev (yellow card) 41' | Stadium: Azersun Arena; Attendance: 500; Referee: Aliyar Ağayev |

| 25 October 2016 9 | Sumgayit | 2 – 2 | Gabala | Sumqayit |
| 16:00 AZT (UTC+4) | B.Hasanalizade (yellow card) 34'; Malikov (yellow card) 40'; Y.Nabiyev 47'; Yunanov 90+4' (pen.) | Report | Stanković (yellow card) 58'; Eyyubov 64'; Qurbanov (yellow card) 68'; Ozobić 73'; S.Guliyev (yellow card) 81' (yellow-red card) 90+3'; Santos (yellow card) 83'; A.Mammadov (yellow card) 90+4' | Stadium: Kapital Bank Arena; Attendance: 1,250; Referee: Rahim Həsənov |

| 30 October 2016 10 | Inter Baku | 3 – 1 | Sumgayit | Baku |
| 16:00 AZT (UTC+4) | Khizanishvili 21'; Fardjad-Azad (yellow card) 25'; Hajiyev 55', 80' | Report | Abbasov 3' (yellow card) 59'; Malikov (yellow card) 58' | Stadium: Inter Arena; Attendance: 200; Referee: Omar Paşayev |

| 5 November 2016 11 | Kapaz | 0 – 0 | Sumgayit | Ganja |
| 14:30 AZT (UTC+4) | J.Javadov (yellow card) 24'; K.Diniyev (yellow card) 30' (yellow-red card) 62' | Report | Yunanov (yellow card) 65' | Stadium: Ganja City Stadium; Attendance: 5,000; Referee: Aliyar Ağayev |

| 20 November 2016 12 | Sumgayit | 2 – 0 | Neftchi Baku | Sumqayit |
| 14:00 AZT (UTC+4) | Guluzade 3' (yellow card) 43'; A.Mehdiyev (yellow card) 63'; Abbasov 75' | Report | E.Badalov (yellow card) 65' | Stadium: Kapital Bank Arena; Attendance: 1,300; Referee: Rahim Həsənov |

| 27 November 2016 13 | AZAL | 1 – 1 | Sumgayit | Baku |
| 16:00 AZT (UTC+4) | D.Janelidze (yellow card) 14'; A.Coronado (yellow card) 30' (yellow-red card) 85'; Kvirtia 38'; K.Huseynov (yellow card) 41'; Mirzaga Huseynpur (yellow card) 90+3' | Report | Malikov (yellow card) 15'; Kurbanov (yellow card) 15'; Guluzade (yellow card) 54'; Yunanov 86' (pen.); Hüseynov (yellow card) 90+2' | Stadium: AZAL Arena; Attendance: 150; Referee: Ramil Diniyev |

| 17 December 2016 14 | Sumgayit | 1 – 0 | Zira | Sumqayit |
| 16:00 AZT (UTC+4) | Abbasov 22'; Guluzade (yellow card) 82'; K.Abdullzade (yellow card) 86' | Report | Nazirov (yellow card) 70'; Naghiyev (yellow card) 71'; E.Nəbiyev (yellow card) 88' | Stadium: Kapital Bank Arena; Attendance: 350; Referee: Omar Paşayev |

| 28 January 2017 15 | Gabala | 1 – 1 | Sumgayit | Qabala |
| 15:00 AZT (UTC+4) | Qurbanov (yellow card) 51'; T.Mutallimov (yellow card) 54'; Vernydub 58'; Abbasov (yellow card) 88' | Report | A.Salahli (yellow card) 13'; Gystarov (yellow card) 31'; N.Mukhtarov (yellow card) 51'; Kurbanov 53'; Hüseynov (yellow card) 81' | Stadium: Gabala City Stadium; Attendance: 1,000; Referee: Aliyar Ağayev |

| 4 February 2017 16 | Sumgayit | 2 – 2 | Inter Baku | Sumqayit |
| 16:30 AZT (UTC+4) | Hüseynov (yellow card) 8'; Abbasov 19' (pen.); Malikov (yellow card) 60'; N.Mukhtarov 90+1' | Report | Guliyev (yellow card) 18'; Qirtimov 49'; S.Alkhasov (yellow card) 57'; E.Abdullayev (yellow card) 69'; Aliyev 90' | Stadium: Kapital Bank Arena; Attendance: 1,300; Referee: Ingilab Məmmədov |

| 9 February 2017 17 | Sumgayit | 3 – 1 | Kapaz | Sumqayit |
| 15:00 AZT (UTC+4) | Chernyshev 7'; A.Salahli 29'; N.Mukhtarov (yellow card) 45'; X.Najafov (yellow card) 59'; Kurbanov 61' | Report | N.Mammadov (yellow card) 67'; K.Diniyev 71' (yellow card) 71'; S.Rahimov (yellow card) 79' | Stadium: Kapital Bank Arena; Attendance: 1,200; Referee: Rahim Həsənov |

| 13 February 2017 18 | Neftchi Baku | 1 – 0 | Sumgayit | Baku |
| 17:30 AZT (UTC+4) | Petrov (yellow card) 69'; Navalovski (yellow card) 76'; Bargas 86' (yellow card) 86'; M.Isayev (yellow card) 88' | Report | K.Najafov (yellow card) 82' | Stadium: Bakcell Arena; Attendance: 1,800; Referee: Fariz Yusifov |

| 19 February 2017 19 | Sumgayit | 1 – 0 | AZAL | Sumqayit |
| 15:00 AZT (UTC+4) | Y.Nabiyev 13'; Kurbanov (yellow card) 45+1' | Report | Tounkara (yellow card) 90+3' | Stadium: Kapital Bank Arena; Attendance: 1,500; Referee: Rahim Həsənov |

| 27 February 2017 20 | Zira | 1 – 0 | Sumgayit | Zirə |
| 18:00 AZT (UTC+4) | Gadze 35'; N.Novruzov (yellow card) 80'; Krneta (yellow card) 88' | Report | | Stadium: Zira Olympic Sport Complex Stadium; Attendance: 1,300; Referee: Fariz Yusifov |

| 4 March 2017 21 | Sumgayit | 0 – 4 | Qarabağ | Sumqayit |
| 16:00 AZT (UTC+4) | Mustafazade (yellow card) 24'; Chernyshev (yellow card) 58'; Kurbanov (yellow card) 62' | Report | Míchel 23'; Richard 45+1' (pen.); Muarem 49'; Guseynov 60' | Stadium: Kapital Bank Arena; Attendance: 2,500; Referee: Ramil Diniyev |

| 13 March 2017 22 | Inter Baku | 1 – 0 | Sumgayit | Baku |
| 18:00 AZT (UTC+4) | Hajiyev 39'; E.Abdullayev (yellow card) 45+1'; Scarlatache (yellow card) 52' | Report | Malikov (yellow card) 56'; E.Shahverdiyev (yellow card) 74' | Stadium: Inter Arena; Attendance: 700; Referee: Aliyar Ağayev |

| 18 March 2017 23 | Kapaz | 1 – 0 | Sumgayit | Ganja |
| 16:00 AZT (UTC+4) | S.Rahimov (yellow card) 29'; Dário 45'; Renan (yellow card) 72' | Report | Gystarov (yellow card) 30'; Hüseynov (yellow card) 90+4' | Stadium: Ganja City Stadium; Attendance: 7,200; Referee: Ingilab Məmmədov |

| 2 April 2017 24 | Sumgayit | 2 – 0 | Neftchi Baku | Sumqayit |
| 18:30 AZT (UTC+4) | Gystarov (yellow card) 53'; B.Hasanalizade 60'; Yunanov 63' | Report | Imamverdiyev (yellow card) 74' | Stadium: Kapital Bank Arena; Attendance: 2,002; Referee: Rahim Həsənov |

| 9 April 2017 25 | AZAL | 1 – 2 | Sumgayit | Baku |
| 17:30 AZT (UTC+4) | Amirjanov 41'; Jafarguliyev (yellow card) 90' | Report | Yunanov 22'; N.Mukhtarov (yellow card) 40'; Abbasov 64'; B.Hasanalizade (yellow card) 75' | Stadium: AZAL Arena; Attendance: 300; Referee: Rauf Jabbarov |

| 15 April 2017 26 | Sumgayit | 1 – 1 | Zira | Sumqayit |
| 16:30 AZT (UTC+4) | B.Hasanalizade (yellow card) 22'; A.Salahli (yellow card) 31'; Gystarov (yellow card) 60'; N.Mukhtarov (yellow card) 73'; Abbasov 83'; A.Mehdiyev (yellow card) 90+4' | Report | Naghiyev (yellow card) 67'; Đurić 90+4' (pen.) (yellow card) 90+4' | Stadium: Kapital Bank Arena; Attendance: 1,600; Referee: Aliyar Ağayev |

| 23 April 2017 27 | Qarabağ | 2 – 1 | Sumgayit | Baku |
| 17:00 AZT (UTC+4) | Muarem 12' (yellow card) 89'; Medvedev (yellow card) 78'; Guseynov (yellow card) 81'; E.Abdullayev 82'; Yunuszade (yellow card) 90+3' | Report | K.Najafov (yellow card) 31'; Yunanov 83'; A.Mehdiyev (yellow card) 87' | Stadium: Azersun Arena; Attendance: 1,800; Referee: Elvin Əsgərov |

| 29 April 2017 28 | Sumgayit | 2 – 1 | Gabala | Sumqayit |
| 16:00 AZT (UTC+4) | Yunanov 27' (yellow card) 38'; Abbasov 29' (yellow card) 88'; Malikov (yellow card) 78' | Report | A.Mammadov 40'; G.Aliyev (yellow card) 90' | Stadium: Kapital Bank Arena; Attendance: 1,300; Referee: Ingilab Məmmədov |

==== League table ====
| Pos | Team | Pld | W | D | L | GF | GA | GD | Pts | Qualification or relegation |
|---|---|---|---|---|---|---|---|---|---|---|
| 4 | Zira | 28 | 10 | 9 | 9 | 29 | 26 | +3 | 39 | Qualification for the Europa League first qualifying round |
| 5 | Kapaz | 28 | 9 | 9 | 10 | 24 | 27 | −3 | 36 | |
| 6 | Sumgayit | 28 | 9 | 8 | 11 | 28 | 35 | −7 | 35 | |
| 7 | Neftçi Baku | 28 | 9 | 2 | 17 | 24 | 45 | −21 | 29 | |
| 8 | AZAL (R) | 28 | 1 | 7 | 20 | 13 | 50 | −37 | 10 | Relegation to the Azerbaijan First Division |

Source: PFL (in Azerbaijani), UEFA, Soccerway
Rules for classification: 1) Points; 2) Head-to-head points; 3) Head-to-head goal difference; 4) Head-to-head goals scored; 5) Head-to-head away goals scored (only if two teams); 6) Goal difference; 7) Goals scored.
(R) Relegated

=== Azerbaijan Cup ===
| 2 December 2016 Second Round | MOIK Baku | 0 – 2 | Sumgayit | Baku |
| 14:00 AZT (UTC+4) | J.Muxtarzadə (yellow card) 45'; G.İbrahimov (yellow card) 66' | Report | A.Mehdiyev (yellow card) 44'; Kurbanov 76'; Hüseynov (yellow card) 78'; Yunanov 83' | Stadium: Bayil Stadium; Attendance: 150; Referee: Aliyar Ağayev |

| 13 December 2016 Quarterfinal First Leg | Qarabağ | 6 – 0 | Sumgayit | Baku |
| 18:00 AZT (UTC+4) | Richard 25' (pen.); Ndlovu 34' (pen.); Diniyev 40'; Madatov 64', 78'; Alasgarov 67' | Report | Hüseynov (yellow card) 34'; B.Hasanalizade (yellow card) 54'; K.Najafov (yellow card) 68' | Stadium: Azersun Arena; Attendance: 500; Referee: Orkhan Mammadov |

| 21 December 2016 Quarterfinal Second Leg | Sumgayit | 2 – 5 (2 – 11 agg.) | Qarabağ | Sumgayit |
| 15:00 AZT (UTC+4) | Yunanov 14', 80'; B.Hasanalizade (yellow card) 66'; N.Abilayev (yellow card) 72' | Report | Alasgarov 8', 16', 82'; Nadirov 70'; Amirguliyev 90' | Stadium: Kapital Bank Arena; Attendance: 950 |

== Squad statistics ==
As of Match played 29 April 2017

=== Appearances and goals ===
| No. | Pos | Nat | Player | Total | | Premier League | | Azerbaijan Cup | |
| No. | Pos | Nat | Player | Apps | Goals | Apps | Goals | Apps | Goals |
|---|---|---|---|---|---|---|---|---|---|
| 1 | GK | (Azerbaijan) AZE | Farhad Valiyev | 29 | 0 | 28 | 0 | 1 | 0 |
| 2 | DF | (Azerbaijan) AZE | Rail Malikov | 26 | 0 | 24 | 0 | 2 | 0 |
| 3 | DF | (Azerbaijan) AZE | Vurğun Hüseynov | 29 | 0 | 27 | 0 | 2 | 0 |
| 5 | MF | (Azerbaijan) AZE | Seymur Asadov | 15 | 1 | 6+8 | 1 | 1 | 0 |
| 7 | MF | (Azerbaijan) AZE | Sergey Chernyshev | 9 | 1 | 6+3 | 1 | 0 | 0 |
| 8 | MF | (Azerbaijan) AZE | Nijat Mukhtarov | 23 | 1 | 15+6 | 1 | 2 | 0 |
| 9 | FW | (Azerbaijan) AZE | Amil Yunanov | 26 | 9 | 13+10 | 6 | 2+1 | 3 |
| 10 | FW | (Azerbaijan) AZE | Magomed Kurbanov | 24 | 3 | 21+1 | 2 | 2 | 1 |
| 13 | DF | (Azerbaijan) AZE | Bahlul Mustafazade | 4 | 0 | 2+2 | 0 | 0 | 0 |
| 14 | DF | (Azerbaijan) AZE | Bakhtiyar Hasanalizade | 27 | 1 | 24 | 1 | 3 | 0 |
| 17 | DF | (Azerbaijan) AZE | Vaguf Gulaliyev | 2 | 0 | 0+1 | 0 | 0+1 | 0 |
| 18 | MF | (Azerbaijan) AZE | Suleiman Akhmedov | 5 | 0 | 1+2 | 0 | 2 | 0 |
| 19 | DF | (Azerbaijan) AZE | Azer Salahli | 31 | 1 | 26+2 | 1 | 3 | 0 |
| 20 | MF | (Russia) RUS | Farkhad Gystarov | 8 | 0 | 8 | 0 | 0 | 0 |
| 21 | MF | (Russia) RUS | Nasyr Abilayev | 8 | 0 | 1+5 | 0 | 1+1 | 0 |
| 22 | FW | (Azerbaijan) AZE | Mirabdulla Abbasov | 30 | 8 | 19+8 | 8 | 1+2 | 0 |
| 25 | MF | (Azerbaijan) AZE | Ayaz Mehdiyev | 18 | 0 | 11+5 | 0 | 2 | 0 |
| 39 | MF | (Azerbaijan) AZE | Tural Bayramlı | 3 | 0 | 0+2 | 0 | 0+1 | 0 |
| 42 | MF | (Azerbaijan) AZE | Kamran Abdullzade | 12 | 0 | 8+2 | 0 | 1+1 | 0 |
| 74 | DF | (Azerbaijan) AZE | Yusif Nabiyev | 18 | 3 | 15+3 | 3 | 0 | 0 |
| 77 | MF | (Azerbaijan) AZE | Ehtiram Shahverdiyev | 12 | 0 | 7+5 | 0 | 0 | 0 |
| 94 | GK | (Azerbaijan) AZE | Tarlan Ahmadli | 2 | 0 | 0 | 0 | 2 | 0 |
| 97 | MF | (Azerbaijan) AZE | Khayal Najafov | 21 | 0 | 14+5 | 0 | 2 | 0 |
Players who appeared for Zira but left during the season:
| 7 | FW | (Azerbaijan) AZE | Vagif Javadov | 15 | 3 | 10+3 | 3 | 2 | 0 |
| 11 | MF | (Iran) IRI | Ebrahim Abednezhad | 5 | 0 | 4+1 | 0 | 0 | 0 |
| 24 | MF | (Azerbaijan) AZE | Amit Guluzade | 16 | 1 | 13 | 1 | 2+1 | 0 |
| 66 | MF | (Iran) IRI | Afshin Esmaeilzadeh | 10 | 0 | 5+5 | 0 | 0 | 0 |

=== Goal scorers ===
| Place | Position | Nation | Number | Name | Premier League | Azerbaijan Cup | Total |
|---|---|---|---|---|---|---|---|
| 1 | FW | (Azerbaijan) | 9 | Amil Yunanov | 6 | 3 | 9 |
| 2 | FW | (Azerbaijan) | 22 | Mirabdulla Abbasov | 8 | 0 | 8 |
| 3 | FW | (Azerbaijan) | 7 | Vagif Javadov | 3 | 0 | 3 |
| 3 | DF | (Azerbaijan) | 74 | Yusif Nabiyev | 3 | 0 | 3 |
| 3 | FW | (Azerbaijan) | 10 | Magomed Kurbanov | 2 | 1 | 3 |
| 6 | MF | (Azerbaijan) | 5 | Seymur Asadov | 1 | 0 | 1 |
| 6 | MF | (Azerbaijan) | 24 | Amit Guluzade | 1 | 0 | 1 |
| 6 | MF | (Azerbaijan) | 8 | Nijat Mukhtarov | 1 | 0 | 1 |
| 6 | MF | (Azerbaijan) | 7 | Sergey Chernyshev | 1 | 0 | 1 |
| 6 | DF | (Azerbaijan) | 19 | Azer Salahli | 1 | 0 | 1 |
| 6 | DF | (Azerbaijan) | 14 | Bakhtiyar Hasanalizade | 1 | 0 | 1 |
| | | | | TOTALS | 28 | 4 | 32 |

=== Disciplinary record ===
| Number | Nation | Position | Name | Premier League | | Azerbaijan Cup | | Total | |
| Number | Nation | Position | Name | Yellow card | Red card | Yellow card | Red card | Yellow card | Red card |
| 2 | (Azerbaijan) | DF | Rail Malikov | 6 | 0 | 0 | 0 | 6 | 0 |
| 3 | (Azerbaijan) | DF | Vurğun Hüseynov | 5 | 0 | 2 | 0 | 7 | 0 |
| 7 | (Azerbaijan) | FW | Vagif Javadov | 1 | 0 | 0 | 0 | 1 | 0 |
| 7 | (Azerbaijan) | MF | Sergey Chernyshev | 1 | 0 | 0 | 0 | 1 | 0 |
| 8 | (Azerbaijan) | MF | Nijat Mukhtarov | 4 | 0 | 0 | 0 | 4 | 0 |
| 9 | (Azerbaijan) | FW | Amil Yunanov | 3 | 0 | 0 | 0 | 3 | 0 |
| 10 | (Azerbaijan) | FW | Magomed Kurbanov | 3 | 0 | 0 | 0 | 3 | 0 |
| 13 | (Azerbaijan) | DF | Bahlul Mustafazade | 1 | 0 | 0 | 0 | 1 | 0 |
| 14 | (Azerbaijan) | DF | Bakhtiyar Hasanalizade | 3 | 0 | 2 | 0 | 5 | 0 |
| 19 | (Azerbaijan) | DF | Azer Salahli | 2 | 0 | 0 | 0 | 2 | 0 |
| 20 | (Azerbaijan) | MF | Farkhad Gystarov | 4 | 0 | 0 | 0 | 4 | 0 |
| 21 | (Russia) | MF | Nasyr Abilayev | 0 | 0 | 1 | 0 | 1 | 0 |
| 22 | (Azerbaijan) | FW | Mirabdulla Abbasov | 2 | 0 | 0 | 0 | 2 | 0 |
| 24 | (Azerbaijan) | MF | Amit Guluzade | 4 | 0 | 0 | 0 | 4 | 0 |
| 25 | (Azerbaijan) | MF | Ayaz Mehdiyev | 3 | 0 | 1 | 0 | 4 | 0 |
| 42 | (Azerbaijan) | MF | Kamran Abdullzade | 1 | 0 | 0 | 0 | 1 | 0 |
| 66 | (Iran) | MF | Afshin Esmaeilzadeh | 1 | 0 | 0 | 0 | 1 | 0 |
| 74 | (Azerbaijan) | DF | Yusif Nabiyev | 3 | 0 | 0 | 0 | 3 | 0 |
| 77 | (Azerbaijan) | MF | Ehtiram Shahverdiyev | 1 | 0 | 0 | 0 | 1 | 0 |
| 97 | (Azerbaijan) | MF | Khayal Najafov | 3 | 0 | 1 | 0 | 4 | 0 |
| | | | TOTALS | 51 | 0 | 7 | 0 | 58 | 0 |
