= 2017–18 Sumgayit FK season =

Sumgayit
2017-18 season
- President: Kamran Guliyev
- Manager: Samir Abbasov
- Stadium: Kapital Bank Arena
- Premier League: 5th
- Azerbaijan Cup: Semifinal vs Keşla
- Top goalscorer: League: Amil Yunanov (10); All: Amil Yunanov (13)

The Sumgayit FK 2017-18 season was Sumgayit's seventh Azerbaijan Premier League season, and eight season in their history. It is their second full season with Samir Abbasov as manager, finishing the season in fifth place whilst also reaching the Semifinals of the Azerbaijan Cup.

== Squad ==
As of match played 20 May 2018

No.	Name	Nationality	Position	Date of birth (age)	Signed from	Signed in	Contract ends	Apps.	Goals
Goalkeepers
1	Farhad Valiyev	(Azerbaijan)	GK	1 November 1980 (aged 37)	Qarabağ	2016		54	0
23	Mehdi Jannatov	(Russia)	GK	26 January 1992 (aged 26)	Anzhi Makhachkala	2017		9	0
36	Suleyman Suleymanov	(Azerbaijan)	GK	29 May 1998 (aged 19)	Gabala	2017		0	0
Defenders
2	Rail Malikov	(Azerbaijan)	DF	18 December 1985 (aged 32)	AZAL	2016		53	0
3	Vurğun Hüseynov	(Azerbaijan)	DF	25 April 1988 (aged 30)	Gabala	2013		138	1
5	Vugar Beybalayev	(Azerbaijan)	DF	5 August 1993 (aged 24)	Kapaz	2017		29	0
13	Bahlul Mustafazade	(Azerbaijan)	DF	27 February 1997 (aged 21)	loan from Gabala	2017		25	2
14	Bakhtiyar Hasanalizade	(Azerbaijan)	DF	29 December 1992 (aged 25)	Trainee	2011		158	4
18	Tural Akhundov	(Azerbaijan)	DF	1 August 1988 (aged 29)	Kapaz	2017		31	4
19	Azer Salahli	(Azerbaijan)	DF	11 April 1994 (aged 24)	Qarabağ	2017		63	2
Midfielders
6	Kamal Mirzayev	(Azerbaijan)	MF	5 August 1993 (aged 24)	Kapaz	2017		23	2
7	Javid Taghiyev	(Azerbaijan)	MF	22 July 1992 (aged 25)	Zira	2017		20	0
8	Nijat Mukhtarov	(Azerbaijan)	MF	1 June 1995 (aged 22)	Ravan Baku	2016		38	1
10	Javid Imamverdiyev	(Azerbaijan)	MF	1 August 1990 (aged 27)	Neftchi Baku	2017		32	7
11	Ehtiram Shahverdiyev	(Azerbaijan)	MF	1 October 1996 (aged 21)	loan from Gabala	2017		27	1
17	Nijat Gurbanov	(Azerbaijan)	MF	17 February 1992 (aged 26)	Zira	2018		7	1
20	Rüfət Abdullazadə	(Azerbaijan)	MF	17 January 2001 (aged 17)	Trainee	2017		1	0
28	Səbuhi Abdullazadə	(Azerbaijan)	MF	18 December 2001 (aged 16)	Trainee	2017		2	0
38	Mushfig Rzayev	(Azerbaijan)	MF	23 March 1998 (aged 20)	Solyaris Moscow	2017		0	0
39	Tural Bayramli	(Azerbaijan)	MF	7 January 1998 (aged 20)	Trainee	2017		0	0
77	Elnur Abdullayev	(Azerbaijan)	MF	16 February 1986 (aged 32)	Keşla	2018		7	0
97	Khayal Najafov	(Azerbaijan)	MF	19 December 1997 (aged 20)	Trainee	2014		64	1
	Farid Kerimzade	(Azerbaijan)	MF	5 April 1997 (aged 21)	Trainee	2017		2	0
Forwards
9	Amil Yunanov	(Azerbaijan)	FW	6 January 1993 (aged 25)	Ravan Baku	2015		86	34
32	Rashad Eyyubov	(Azerbaijan)	FW	3 December 1992 (aged 25)	Gabala	2017		28	4
70	Ulvi Iskandarov	(Azerbaijan)	FW	17 April 1998 (aged 20)	loan from Gabala	2017		6	0
Left during the season
90	Ramil Hasanov	(Ukraine)	FW	15 February 1996 (aged 22)	loan from Gabala	2017		5	0

== Transfers ==
=== Summer ===
In: Note: Flags indicate national team as defined under FIFA eligibility rules; some limited exceptions apply. Players may hold more than one non-FIFA nationality.

No.	Pos.	Nation	Player
5	DF	AZE	Vugar Beybalayev (from (Azerbaijan) Kapaz)
6	MF	AZE	Kamal Mirzayev (from (Azerbaijan) Kapaz)
7	MF	AZE	Javid Taghiyev (from (Azerbaijan) Zira)
10	MF	AZE	Javid Imamverdiyev (from (Azerbaijan) Neftchi Baku)
11	MF	AZE	Ehtiram Shahverdiyev (loan extended from (Azerbaijan) Gabala)
18	DF	AZE	Tural Akhundov (from (Azerbaijan) Kapaz)
19	DF	AZE	Azer Salahli (from (Azerbaijan) Qarabağ, previously on loan)
32	FW	AZE	Rashad Eyyubov (from (Azerbaijan) Gabala)
36	GK	AZE	Suleyman Suleymanov (from (Azerbaijan) Gabala)
38	MF	AZE	Mushfig Rzayev (from (Azerbaijan) Solyaris Moscow)
90	FW	UKR	Ramil Hasanov (on loan from (Azerbaijan) Gabala)

Out: Note: Flags indicate national team as defined under FIFA eligibility rules; some limited exceptions apply. Players may hold more than one non-FIFA nationality.

No.	Pos.	Nation	Player
5	MF	AZE	Seymur Asadov (to (Azerbaijan) Səbail)
6	DF	AZE	Mikayil Rahimov
7	MF	RUS	Sergey Chernyshev (to (Azerbaijan) Kapaz)
10	FW	AZE	Magomed Kurbanov (to (Azerbaijan) Kapaz)
18	MF	AZE	Suleyman Ahmadov (to (Azerbaijan) Qarabağ)
19	DF	AZE	Azer Salahli (loan return to (Azerbaijan) Qarabağ)
20	MF	RUS	Farkhad Gystarov (to (Russia) Mashuk-KMV Pyatigorsk)
21	MF	RUS	Nasyr Abilayev (to (Russia) Anzhi Makhachkala)
22	FW	AZE	Mirabdulla Abbasov (loan return to (Azerbaijan) Neftchi Baku)
23	MF	AZE	Ilgar Huseynov
25	MF	AZE	Ayaz Mehdiyev
42	MF	AZE	Kamran Abdullzade (to (Azerbaijan) Kapaz)
74	DF	AZE	Yusif Nabiyev (loan return to (Azerbaijan) Gabala)
94	GK	AZE	Tarlan Ahmadli (to (Azerbaijan) Shuvalan)
—	FW	AZE	Emin Mehdiyev (to (Azerbaijan) Səbail)

=== Winter ===
In: Note: Flags indicate national team as defined under FIFA eligibility rules; some limited exceptions apply. Players may hold more than one non-FIFA nationality.

No.	Pos.	Nation	Player
17	MF	AZE	Nijat Gurbanov (from (Azerbaijan) Zira)
70	FW	AZE	Ülvi İsgəndərov (loan from (Azerbaijan) Gabala)
77	MF	AZE	Elnur Abdullayev (from (Azerbaijan) Keshla)

Out: Note: Flags indicate national team as defined under FIFA eligibility rules; some limited exceptions apply. Players may hold more than one non-FIFA nationality.

No.	Pos.	Nation	Player
90	FW	UKR	Ramil Hasanov (loan return to (Azerbaijan) Gabala)

== Friendlies ==
2 July 2017	Sumgayit (Azerbaijan)	2 – 2	(Azerbaijan) Səbail	Sumgayit, Azerbaijan
17:00 AZT (UTC+4)	Hasanov	Report	E.Mehdiyev; S.Mammodov	Stadium: Kapital Bank Arena

8 July 2017	Səbail (Azerbaijan)	0 – 1	(Azerbaijan) Sumgayit	Baku, Azerbaijan
17:00 AZT (UTC+4)		Report	Imamverdiyev	Stadium: Auxiliary stadium of Baku Olympic Stadium

20 July 2017	Sumgayit (Azerbaijan)	3 – 0	(Saudi Arabia) Al-Fateh	Bolu, Turkey
18:00 Turkey Time (UTC+3)	Eyyubov 14', 37'; Hasanov 88'	Report		Stadium: Stadium of VON Resort Hotel

23 July 2017	Sivasspor (Turkey)	4 – 0	(Azerbaijan) Sumgayit	Bolu, Turkey
18:00 Turkey Time (UTC+3)	Leandrinho 12'; Güzel 49'; M.Yandaş 70'; S.Mutlu 84'	Report		Stadium: Stadium of the Bolu Termal Hotel

25 July 2017	Adana Demirspor (Turkey)	2 – 1	(Azerbaijan) Sumgayit	Bolu, Turkey
18:00 Turkey Time (UTC+3)	Mendy 08'; Atakora 70'	Report	Eyyubov 88'	Stadium: Stadium of the Bolu Termal Hotel

28 July 2017	Sumgayit (Azerbaijan)	1 – 0	(Saudi Arabia) Al-Taawoun	Bolu, Turkey
Turkey Time (UTC+3)	Imamverdiyev 4'	Report		Stadium: Highland Sports Complex

4 September 2017	Gabala (Azerbaijan)	1 – 3	(Azerbaijan) Sumgayit	Baku, Azerbaijan
16:45 AZT (UTC+4)	Andy Halliday 45' (pen.)	Report	Amil Yunanov 22'; Javid Imamverdiyev 56', 70'	Stadium: Ismat Gayibov Stadium

7 October 2017	Qarabağ (Azerbaijan)	1 – 2	(Azerbaijan) Sumgayit	Baku, Azerbaijan
15:30 AZT (UTC+4)	Míchel (pen.)	Report	Amil Yunanov 10'; Azer Salahli 19'	Stadium: Azersun Arena

25 January 2018	Sumgayit (Azerbaijan)	0 – 1	(Romania) Concordia Chiajna	Antalya, Turkey
17:00 AZT (UTC+4)		Report	Goal	Stadium: Sense De Luxe Hotel

28 January 2018	Sumgayit (Azerbaijan)	1 – 1	(North Macedonia) Akademija Pandev	Antalya, Turkey
15:00 AZT (UTC+4)	Hüseynov	Report	Goal	Stadium: Sense De Luxe Hotel

31 January 2018	Sumgayit (Azerbaijan)	0 – 1	(Russia) Anzhi Makhachkala	Antalya, Turkey
18:00 AZT (UTC+4)		Report

5 February 2018	Sumgayit (Azerbaijan)	0 – 4	(Serbia) Mladost Lučani	Antalya, Turkey
AZT (UTC+4)		Report	Goal	Stadium: Kundu Fanatic Hotel

== Competitions ==
=== Azerbaijan Premier League ===
==== Results summary ====
Overall								Home						Away					
Pld	W	D	L	GF	GA	GD	Pts	W	D	L	GF	GA	GD	W	D	L	GF	GA	GD
28	11	7	10	31	32	−1	40	7	2	5	15	14	+1	4	5	5	16	18	−2

Last updated: 20 May 2018.
Source: See Results

==== Results ====
13 August 2017 1	Sumgayit	2 – 1	Kapaz	Sumqayit
21:00 AZT (UTC+4)	Imamverdiyev 16'; V.Beybalayev (yellow card) 24'; Taghiyev (yellow card) 68'; Yunanov 74'; B.Hasanalizade (yellow card) 83'; K.Mirzayev (yellow card) 90+2'	Report	V.Oseghale 52'	Stadium: Kapital Bank Arena; Attendance: 1,326; Referee: Fariz Yusifov

20 August 2017 2	Gabala	1 – 0	Sumgayit	Qabala
20:00 AZT (UTC+4)	Mutallimov 40'; E.Mammadov (yellow card) 57'	Report	A.Salahli (yellow card) 2'; E.Shahverdiyev (yellow card) 77'	Stadium: Gabala City Stadium; Attendance: 2,500; Referee: Aliyar Ağayev

26 August 2017 3	Zira	3 – 1	Sumgayit	Zirə
18:00 AZT (UTC+4)	Mustafayev (yellow card) 51'; Gadze 52'; Isgandarli 61', 77' (yellow card) 61'; Đurić (yellow card) 63'	Report	E.Shahverdiyev (yellow card) 18'; T.Akhundov (yellow card) 37'; Boum 88' (o.g.)	Stadium: Zira Olympic Sport Complex Stadium; Attendance: 1,100; Referee: Omar Paşayev

10 September 2017 4	Sumgayit	1 – 0	Neftchi Baku	Sumqayit
19:00 AZT (UTC+4)	Yunanov 25' (pen.); K.Najafov (yellow card) 66'	Report	Petrov (yellow card) 66'	Stadium: Kapital Bank Arena; Attendance: 1,500; Referee: Rahim Həsənov

16 September 2017 5	Inter Baku	1 – 1	Sumgayit	Baku
16:30 AZT (UTC+4)	S.Tashkin 11'; S.Alkhasov (yellow card) 79'	Report	Eyyubov 48'; V.Beybalayev (yellow card) 76'	Stadium: Inter Arena; Attendance: 500; Referee: Ramil Diniyev

22 September 2017 6	Qarabağ	4 – 1	Sumgayit	Baku
19:00 AZT (UTC+4)	Rzeźniczak (yellow card) 35'; Pedro Henrique 55'; Richard 61' (pen.); Madatov 64', 72'; Míchel (yellow card) 77' (yellow-red card) 88'	Report	B.Hasanalizade 8'; Taghiyev (yellow card) 35'; Dzhenetov (yellow card) 55'; K.Najafov (yellow card) 87'	Stadium: Tofiq Bahramov Republican Stadium; Attendance: 1,400; Referee: Orkhan Məmmədov

30 September 2017 7	Səbail	0 – 2	Sumgayit	Baku
17:00 AZT (UTC+4)	T.Tsetskhladze (yellow card) 45'; Renan (yellow card) 45+1'	Report	A.Salahli 10'; K.Mirzayev (yellow card) 45'; T.Akhundov (yellow card) 45+1'; Yunanov (yellow card) 60'	Stadium: Dalga Arena; Attendance: 400; Referee: Ramil Diniyev

14 October 2017 8	Sumgayit	0 – 1	Gabala	Sumqayit
18:00 AZT (UTC+4)	Malikov (yellow card) 37'; B.Hasanalizade (yellow card) 54'	Report	Koné 29'; Halliday (yellow card) 43'; As.Mammadov (yellow card) 80'; Bezotosnyi (yellow card) 88'	Stadium: Kapital Bank Arena; Attendance: 1,300; Referee: Rauf Jabbarov

21 October 2017 9	Sumgayit	2 – 1	Zira	Sumqayit
16:00 AZT (UTC+4)	T.Akhundov (yellow card) 19'; K.Najafov (yellow card) 19'; Yunanov 38'; Hüseynov (yellow card) 73' (goal) 83'	Report	Tounkara 5' (yellow card) 17'; Mustafayev (yellow card) 27'; Khalilzade (yellow card) 81'; Boum (yellow card) 85'	Stadium: Kapital Bank Arena; Attendance: 1300; Referee: İngilab Mammedov

29 October 2017 10	Neftchi Baku	2 – 1	Sumgayit	Baku
18:00 AZT (UTC+4)	M.Abbasov 3'; Abışov (yellow card) 68'; Hajiyev 89' (yellow card) 89'	Report	T.Akhundov 38' (pen.) (yellow card) 87'; Eyyubov (yellow card) 69'; E.Shahverdiyev (yellow card) 90+1'; Malikov (yellow card) 90+2'; B.Hasanalizade (yellow card) 90+3'	Stadium: Bakcell Arena; Attendance: 4,000; Referee: Rauf Jabbarov

4 November 2017 11	Sumgayit	3 – 1	Keşla	Sumqayit
18:00 AZT (UTC+4)	Denis 30' (o.g.); Yunanov 52'; E.Shahverdiyev (yellow card) 58'; Scarlatache 70' (o.g.)	Report	F.Bayramov (yellow card) 40'; Hajiyev 45'; Scarlatache (yellow card) 80'	Stadium: Kapital Bank Arena; Attendance: 1,200; Referee: Aliyar Ağayev
Note: On 28 October 2017, Inter Baku changed their name to Keshla FK.

17 November 2017 12	Qarabağ	2 – 0	Sumgayit	Baku
18:30 AZT (UTC+4)	Šehić (red card) 30'; Richard 41'; Ndlovu 64'	Report	Yunanov (yellow card) 30'; K.Najafov (yellow card) 30'; Hüseynov (yellow card) 45'; V.Beybalayev (yellow card) 63'; B.Hasanalizade (yellow card) 68'	Stadium: Baku Olympic Stadium; Attendance: 2,000; Referee: Ingilab Məmmədov

26 November 2017 13	Symgayit	0 – 0	Səbail	Sumqayit
16:00 AZT (UTC+4)	T.Akhundov (yellow card) 70'; Hüseynov (yellow card) 83'	Report	Agayev (yellow card) 68'; T.Tsetskhladze (yellow card) 82'	Stadium: Kapital Bank Arena; Attendance: 1,326; Referee: Rahim Həsənov

2 December 2017 14	Kapaz	0 – 3	Sumgayit	Ganja
14:00 AZT (UTC+4)	S.Aliyev (yellow card) 81'	Report	B.Hasanalizade 21' (yellow card) 32'; Imamverdiyev 60', 68'	Stadium: Ganja City Stadium; Attendance: 9,500; Referee: Rahim Hasanov

10 February 2018 15	Zira	1 – 1	Sumgayit	Zirə
16:10 AZT (UTC+4)	Isgandarli 40'; Krneta (yellow card) 75'	Report	T.Akhundov 35'; V.Beybalayev (yellow card) 87'; Hüseynov (yellow card) 90+2'	Stadium: Zira Olympic Sport Complex Stadium; Attendance: 500; Referee: Aliyar Ağayev

17 February 2018 16	Sumgayit	2 – 0	Neftchi Baku	Sumqayit
18:30 AZT (UTC+4)	T.Akhundov 13' (pen.); Yunanov 17'; B.Hasanalizade (yellow card) 49'	Report	Mahmudov (yellow card) 32'; Qirtimov (yellow card) 59'; Sadiqov (red card) 60'; Abışov (yellow card) 61'; Herrera (yellow card) 64'; García (yellow card) 69'	Stadium: Kapital Bank Arena; Attendance: 1,300; Referee: Ingilab Məmmədov

25 February 2018 17	Keşla	1 – 2	Sumgayit	Baku
15:00 AZT (UTC+4)	Malikov 12' (o.g.); Scarlatache (yellow card) 38'; F.Bayramov (yellow card) 70'	Report	T.Akhundov 2' (pen.); Imamverdiyev (yellow card) 45'; K.Najafov (yellow card) 55'; Eyyubov 90'	Stadium: Inter Arena; Attendance: 2,000; Referee: Rahim Həsənov

3 March 2018 18	Sumgayit	1 – 1	Qarabağ	Sumqayit
18:30 AZT (UTC+4)	Yunanov 49'	Report	Míchel (yellow card) 37'; Henrique 75' (yellow card) 90'; Guerrier (yellow card) 86'	Stadium: Kapital Bank Arena; Attendance: 1,326; Referee: Ravan Həmzəzadə

10 March 2018 19	Səbail	0 – 1	Sumgayit	Baku
16:00 AZT (UTC+4)	N.Apakidze (yellow card) 80'	Report	Yunanov 69'	Stadium: Bayil Arena; Attendance: 500; Referee: Rahim Həsənov

14 March 2018 20	Sumgayit	2 – 1	Kapaz	Sumqayit
20:00 AZT (UTC+4)	Mustafazade 73'; Imamverdiyev 89'	Report	Korotetskyi 44' (yellow card) 63'; Mandzhgaladze (yellow card) 67'; Dário (yellow card) 71'	Stadium: Kapital Bank Arena; Attendance: 1,000; Referee: Aliyar Ağayev

2 April 2018 21	Gabala	1 – 1	Sumgayit	Qabala
17:00 AZT (UTC+4)	E.Jamalov (yellow card) 26'; Joseph-Monrose 55' (yellow card) 80'; Stanković (yellow card) 67'	Report	V.Beybalayev (yellow card) 40'; N.Gurbanov 83'	Stadium: Gabala City Stadium; Attendance: 550; Referee: Ingilab Məmmədov

8 April 2018 22	Neftchi Baku	2 – 2	Sumgayit	Baku
18:30 AZT (UTC+4)	Abışov (yellow card) 22'; Alaskarov (yellow card) 38' (goal) 63'; M.Abbasov 45'; Qirtimov (yellow card) 90'	Report	Eyyubov 41'; Imamverdiyev 79'; U.İsgəndərov (yellow card) 90'	Stadium: Bakcell Arena; Attendance: 2,500; Referee: Aliyar Ağayev

15 April 2018 23	Sumgayit	2 – 1	Keşla	Sumqayit
18:00 AZT (UTC+4)	Mustafazade 58'; T.Akhundov (yellow card) 70'; E.Shahverdiyev 84'	Report	Podio (yellow card) 61'; M.Isayev 69' (yellow card) 80' (yellow-red card) 81'; M.Guliyev (yellow card) 73'; Fardjad-Azad (yellow card) 76'	Stadium: Kapital Bank Arena; Attendance: 2,500; Referee: Rauf Jabbarov

22 April 2018 24	Sumgayit	0 – 1	Qarabağ	Sumqayit
19:00 AZT (UTC+4)	V.Beybalayev (yellow card) 25'; E.Abdullayev (yellow card) 36'; Mustafazade (yellow card) 90+3'	Report	Yunuszade (yellow card) 27'; Quintana 34'; Garayev (yellow card) 55'; Richard (yellow card) 65'	Stadium: Kapital Bank Arena; Attendance: 2,000; Referee: Omar Paşayev

29 April 2018 25	Sumgayit	1 – 2	Səbail	Sumqayit
19:00 AZT (UTC+4)	N.Gurbanov (yellow card) 70'; Yunanov 76'	Report	Miya 31'; A.Gurbanli 39'; Cociuc (yellow card) 87'	Stadium: Kapital Bank Arena; Attendance: 1,200; Referee: Ravan Həmzəzadə

4 May 2018 26	Kapaz	1 – 1	Sumgayit	Ganja
18:00 AZT (UTC+4)	Mandzhgaladze (yellow card) 21'; Dário 66' (pen.)	Report	Yunanov 86'	Stadium: Ganja City Stadium; Attendance: 3,000; Referee: Rahim Həsənov

12 May 2018 27	Sumgayit	0 – 2	Gabala	Sumqayit
19:00 AZT (UTC+4)	Hüseynov (yellow card) 52'; N.Gurbanov (yellow card) 80'	Report	Dabo 37'; Huseynov 88'	Stadium: Kapital Bank Arena; Attendance: 1,300; Referee: Aliyar Ağayev

20 May 2018 28	Sumgayit	1 – 2	Zira	Sumqayit
17:15 AZT (UTC+4)	Imamverdiyev 13'; K.Najafov (yellow card) 43'; V.Beybalayev (yellow card) 57'	Report	Mustafayev (yellow card) 11'; Gadze (yellow card) 45+3'; Dedov 68' (yellow card) 74'; Urdinov (yellow card) 81'; Nazirov (yellow card) 90+2'; Tounkara 90+5' (yellow card) 90+5'	Stadium: Kapital Bank Arena; Attendance: 1,300; Referee: Rauf Jabbarov

==== League table ====
Pos	Team	Pld	W	D	L	GF	GA	GD	Pts	Qualification or relegation
3	Neftçi Baku	28	14	4	10	39	28	+11	46	Qualification for the Europa League first qualifying round
4	Zira	28	12	8	8	36	30	+6	44	
5	Sumgayit	28	11	7	10	34	33	+1	40	
6	Keşla	28	8	7	13	29	39	−10	31	Qualification for the Europa League first qualifying round (Note: Keşla qualified for the Europa League first qualifying round by winning 2017–18 Azerbaijan Cup.)
7	Səbail	28	6	5	17	19	39	−20	23	

Source: UEFA, Soccerway
Rules for classification: 1) Points; 2) Head-to-head points; 3) Head-to-head goal difference; 4) Head-to-head goals scored; 5) Head-to-head away goals scored (only if two teams); 6) Goal difference; 7) Goals scored.

=== Azerbaijan Cup ===
29 November 2017 Second Round	Sumgayit	3 – 0	Sabah	Sumqayit
16:00 AZT (UTC+4)	K.Mirzayev 49'; Yunanov 68', 73'; B.Hasanalizade (yellow card) 77'	Report		Stadium: Kapital Bank Arena; Attendance: 300; Referee: Elvin Asgərov

11 December 2017 Quarterfinal 1st leg	Qarabağ	2 – 1	Sumgayit	Baku
19:00 AZT (UTC+4)	Richard 57'; Henrique 85'	Report	Eyyubov 23'; A.Salahli (yellow card) 51'; Valiyev (red card) 88'	Stadium: Azersun Arena; Attendance: 450; Referee: Ramil Diniyev

15 December 2017 Quarterfinal 2nd leg	Sumgayit	2 – 0 (3 – 2 agg.)	Qarabağ	Sumqayit
19:00 AZT (UTC+4)	K.Mirzayev 22'; B.Hasanalizade (yellow card) 51'; M.Cənnətov (yellow card) 88'; Yunanov 90' (yellow card) 90'	Report	Guerrier (yellow card) 58'; Rzeźniczak (yellow card) 63'; Míchel (yellow card) 87'	Stadium: Kapital Bank Arena; Attendance: 1,326; Referee: Rahim Hasanov

12 April 2018 Semifinal 1st leg	Keshla	1 – 0	Sumgayit	Baku
16:00 AZT (UTC+4)	Javadov (yellow card) 58'; Meza 90+2'	Report	V.Beybalayev (yellow card) 20'; E.Shahverdiyev (yellow card) 85'	Stadium: Inter Arena; Attendance: 800; Referee: Rahim Həsənov

18 April 2018 Semifinal 2nd leg	Sumgayit	1 – 1 (1 – 2 agg.)	Keshla	Sumqayit
17:00 AZT (UTC+4)	Imamverdiyev 64'; B.Hasanalizade (yellow card) 72'; V.Beybalayev (yellow card) 81'	Report	Sohna (yellow card) 50'; Meza 61'; F.Bayramov (yellow card) 65'	Stadium: Kapital Bank Arena; Attendance: 1,300; Referee: Aliyar Ağayev

== Squad statistics ==
As of Match played 20 May 2018

=== Appearances and goals ===
No.	Pos	Nat	Player	Total		Premier League		Azerbaijan Cup	
No.	Pos	Nat	Player	Apps	Goals	Apps	Goals	Apps	Goals
1	GK	(Azerbaijan) AZE	Farhad Valiyev	25	0	23	0	2	0
2	DF	(Azerbaijan) AZE	Rail Malikov	27	0	23	0	4	0
3	DF	(Azerbaijan) AZE	Vurğun Hüseynov	22	1	19	1	3	0
5	DF	(Azerbaijan) AZE	Vugar Beybalayev	29	0	22+2	0	5	0
6	MF	(Azerbaijan) AZE	Kamal Mirzayev	23	2	8+10	0	4+1	2
7	MF	(Azerbaijan) AZE	Javid Taghiyev	20	0	13+5	0	1+1	0
9	FW	(Azerbaijan) AZE	Amil Yunanov	34	13	27+2	10	5	3
10	MF	(Azerbaijan) AZE	Javid Imamverdiyev	32	7	26+2	6	2+2	1
11	MF	(Azerbaijan) AZE	Ehtiram Shahverdiyev	27	1	11+11	1	4+1	0
13	DF	(Azerbaijan) AZE	Bahlul Mustafazade	21	2	9+7	2	3+2	0
14	DF	(Azerbaijan) AZE	Bakhtiyar Hasanalizade	31	2	27	2	4	0
17	MF	(Azerbaijan) AZE	Nijat Gurbanov	7	1	0+5	1	0+2	0
18	DF	(Azerbaijan) AZE	Tural Akhundov	31	4	26+1	4	3+1	0
19	DF	(Azerbaijan) AZE	Azer Salahli	32	1	27	1	5	0
20	MF	(Azerbaijan) AZE	Rüfət Abdullazadə	1	0	0+1	0	0	0
23	GK	(Russia) RUS	Mehdi Jannatov	9	0	5	0	3+1	0
28	MF	(Azerbaijan) AZE	Səbuhi Abdullazadə	2	0	0+1	0	1	0
32	FW	(Azerbaijan) AZE	Rashad Eyyubov	28	4	21+2	3	4+1	1
70	FW	(Azerbaijan) AZE	Ülvi İsgəndərov	6	0	1+5	0	0	0
77	MF	(Azerbaijan) AZE	Elnur Abdullayev	7	0	3+4	0	0	0
97	MF	(Azerbaijan) AZE	Khayal Najafov	27	0	16+7	0	2+2	0
	MF	(Azerbaijan) AZE	Farid Kerimzade	2	0	0+2	0	0	0
Players who left Sumgayit during the season:
90	FW	(Ukraine) UKR	Ramil Hasanov	5	0	1+3	0	0+1	0

=== Goal scorers ===
Place	Position	Nation	Number	Name	Premier League	Azerbaijan Cup	Total
1	FW	(Azerbaijan)	9	Amil Yunanov	10	3	13
2	MF	(Azerbaijan)	10	Javid Imamverdiyev	6	1	7
2	DF	(Azerbaijan)	18	Tural Akhundov	4	0	4
2	FW	(Azerbaijan)	32	Rashad Eyyubov	3	1	4
5				Own goal	3	0	3
6	DF	(Azerbaijan)	14	Bakhtiyar Hasanalizade	2	0	2
6	DF	(Azerbaijan)	13	Bahlul Mustafazade	2	0	2
6	MF	(Azerbaijan)	6	Kamal Mirzayev	0	2	2
9	DF	(Azerbaijan)	19	Azer Salahli	1	0	1
9	DF	(Azerbaijan)	3	Vurğun Hüseynov	1	0	1
9	MF	(Azerbaijan)	17	Nijat Gurbanov	1	0	1
9	MF	(Azerbaijan)	11	Ehtiram Shahverdiyev	1	0	1
				TOTALS	34	7	41

=== Disciplinary record ===
Number	Nation	Position	Name	Premier League		Azerbaijan Cup		Total	
Number	Nation	Position	Name	Yellow card	Red card	Yellow card	Red card	Yellow card	Red card
1	(Azerbaijan)	GK	Farhad Valiyev	0	0	0	1	0	1
2	(Azerbaijan)	DF	Rail Malikov	2	0	0	0	2	0
3	(Azerbaijan)	DF	Vurğun Hüseynov	5	0	0	0	5	0
5	(Azerbaijan)	DF	Vugar Beybalayev	8	0	2	0	10	0
6	(Azerbaijan)	MF	Kamal Mirzayev	2	0	0	0	2	0
7	(Azerbaijan)	MF	Javid Taghiyev	2	0	0	0	2	0
9	(Azerbaijan)	FW	Amil Yunanov	1	0	1	0	2	0
10	(Azerbaijan)	MF	Javid Imamverdiyev	1	0	0	0	1	0
11	(Azerbaijan)	MF	Ehtiram Shahverdiyev	4	0	1	0	5	0
13	(Azerbaijan)	DF	Bahlul Mustafazade	1	0	0	0	1	0
14	(Azerbaijan)	DF	Bakhtiyar Hasanalizade	6	0	3	0	9	0
17	(Azerbaijan)	MF	Nijat Gurbanov	2	0	0	0	2	0
18	(Azerbaijan)	DF	Tural Akhundov	6	0	0	0	6	0
19	(Azerbaijan)	DF	Azer Salahli	1	0	1	0	2	0
23	(Russia)	GK	Mehdi Jannatov	1	0	1	0	2	0
32	(Azerbaijan)	FW	Rashad Eyyubov	1	0	0	0	1	0
70	(Azerbaijan)	FW	Ülvi İsgəndərov	1	0	0	0	1	0
77	(Azerbaijan)	MF	Elnur Abdullayev	1	0	0	0	1	0
97	(Azerbaijan)	MF	Khayal Najafov	6	0	0	0	6	0
			TOTALS	51	0	9	1	60	1
