= 2015–16 Kapaz PFK season =

Kapaz
2015–16 season
- President: Mehman Allahverdiyev
- Manager: Shahin Diniyev
- Stadium: Ganja City Stadium
- Premier League: 5th
- Azerbaijan Cup: Second Round vs Khazar Lankaran
- Top goalscorer: League: Julien Ebah (9); All: Julien Ebah (9)
- Highest home attendance: 20,400 vs Qarabağ (14 February 2016)
- Lowest home attendance: 8,100 vs Ravan Baku (30 April 2016)
- Average home league attendance: 15,000

The Kapaz PFK 2015–16 season is Kapaz's fourth Azerbaijan Premier League season, and seventh season since their reformation in 2009. It is their first season with Shahin Diniyev as manager, during which they will participate in the Azerbaijan Cup as well as the League.

== Squad ==
As of 30 January 2016

Note: Flags indicate national team as defined under FIFA eligibility rules; some limited exceptions apply. Players may hold more than one non-FIFA nationality.

No.	Pos.	Nation	Player
1	GK	AZE	Eyyub Aliyev
3	DF	AZE	Tarlan Guliyev (loan from Qarabağ)
4	MF	AZE	Elvin Jabrayilli
5	DF	AZE	Karim Diniyev
6	MF	AZE	Jeyhun Javadov
7	MF	BRA	Juninho
8	MF	AZE	Budag Nasirov (loan from Sumgayit)
9	MF	AZE	Namig Alasgarov (loan from Qarabağ)
10	FW	BRA	Dário
13	MF	AZE	Shahriyar Rahimov

No.	Pos.	Nation	Player
15	DF	AZE	Azad Karimov
18	DF	AZE	Tural Akhundov (captain)
19	MF	AZE	Orkhan Aliyev (loan from MOIK Baku)
21	DF	AZE	Khazar Garibov
23	DF	AZE	Tural Narimanov
25	DF	AZE	Shahriyar Aliyev (loan from Qarabağ)
27	FW	AZE	Bakhtiyar Soltanov
80	MF	AZE	Tural Rzayev
88	GK	LTU	Tadas Simaitis
90	FW	CMR	Julien Ebah

== Transfers ==
=== Summer ===
In: Note: Flags indicate national team as defined under FIFA eligibility rules; some limited exceptions apply. Players may hold more than one non-FIFA nationality.

No.	Pos.	Nation	Player
1	GK	AZE	Eyyub Aliyev (from (Azerbaijan) Inter Baku)
3	DF	AZE	Tarlan Guliyev (loan from (Azerbaijan) Qarabağ)
4	MF	AZE	Elvin Jabrayilli (from (Azerbaijan) Ağsu FK)
5	DF	AZE	Karim Diniyev (from (Azerbaijan) AZAL)
6	MF	AZE	Jeyhun Javadov (from (Azerbaijan) Ravan)
7	MF	BRA	Juninho (from (Brazil) Comercial)
8	MF	AZE	Budag Nasirov (loan from (Azerbaijan) Sumgayit)
9	MF	AZE	Murad Aghakishiyev (from (Azerbaijan) Neftchala FK)
10	FW	BRA	Dário (from (Portugal) Trofense)
13	MF	AZE	Shahriyar Rahimov (from (Azerbaijan) AZAL)
15	DF	AZE	Azad Karimov (from (Azerbaijan) Baku)
18	DF	AZE	Tural Akhundov (from (Azerbaijan) Simurq)
19	FW	UKR	Oleksandr Sytnik (from (Ukraine) Olimpik Donetsk)
20	DF	AZE	Maharram Huseynov (from (Azerbaijan) Simurq)
21	DF	AZE	Khazar Garibov (from (Azerbaijan) Shusha FK)
23	DF	AZE	Tural Narimanov (from (Azerbaijan) Ravan)
25	DF	AZE	Shahriyar Aliyev (loan from (Azerbaijan) Qarabağ)
27	FW	AZE	Bakhtiyar Soltanov (from (Azerbaijan) Gabala)
68	FW	AZE	Rashad Eyyubov (from (Azerbaijan) Khazar Lankaran)
80	MF	AZE	Tural Rzayev (from (Azerbaijan) Zira)
88	GK	LTU	Tadas Simaitis (from (Lithuania) Klaipėdos Granitas)
90	FW	CMR	Julien Ebah (from (Cameroon) New Star)

Out: Note: Flags indicate national team as defined under FIFA eligibility rules; some limited exceptions apply. Players may hold more than one non-FIFA nationality.

No.	Pos.	Nation	Player

=== Winter ===
In: Note: Flags indicate national team as defined under FIFA eligibility rules; some limited exceptions apply. Players may hold more than one non-FIFA nationality.

No.	Pos.	Nation	Player
9	MF	AZE	Namig Alasgarov (loan from (Azerbaijan) Qarabağ)
19	MF	AZE	Orkhan Aliyev (loan from (Azerbaijan) MOIK Baku)
—	MF	UKR	Vladimir Korobka (trial)

Out: Note: Flags indicate national team as defined under FIFA eligibility rules; some limited exceptions apply. Players may hold more than one non-FIFA nationality.

No.	Pos.	Nation	Player
9	MF	AZE	Murad Aghakishiyev
19	FW	UKR	Oleksandr Sytnik
20	MF	AZE	Maharram Huseynov
21	DF	AZE	Khazar Garibov
68	FW	AZE	Rashad Eyyubov (to (Azerbaijan) Gabala)
77	FW	AZE	Ziyabil Mammadov

== Competitions ==
=== Azerbaijan Premier League ===
==== Results summary ====
Overall								Home						Away					
Pld	W	D	L	GF	GA	GD	Pts	W	D	L	GF	GA	GD	W	D	L	GF	GA	GD
36	15	11	10	48	40	+8	56	8	6	4	24	14	+10	7	5	6	24	26	−2

Last updated: 20 May 2016.
Source: Soccerway

==== Results ====
9 August 2015 1	Neftchi Baku	0 – 0	Kapaz	Baku
21:00 AZST (UTC+5)	A.Abdullayev (yellow card) 40'; E.Badalov (yellow card) 49'	Summary	S.Aliyev (yellow card) 42' (yellow-red card) 70'; Juninho (yellow card) 48'; M.Aghakishiyev (yellow card) 90+4'	Stadium: Bakcell Arena; Attendance: 1,500; Referee: Fariz Yusifov

16 August 2015 2	Kapaz	1 – 1	Zira	Ganja
18:30 AZST (UTC+5)	S.Rahimov 73'; M.Aghakishiyev (yellow card) 82'	Summary	E.Huseynov (yellow card) 25'; K.Bayramov (yellow card) 82'; N.Gurbanov (yellow card) 82'; A.Shemonayev (yellow card) 90+1'; Ivanović 90+2'	Stadium: Ganja City Stadium; Attendance: 12,500; Referee: Rähim Häsänov

23 August 2015 3	Gabala	1 – 0	Kapaz	Qabala
21:00 AZST (UTC+5)	Zec 6'; Santos (yellow card) 74'; Vernydub (yellow card) 83'	Report	B. Nasirov (yellow card) 21'; T. Narimanov (yellow card) 58'; B. Soltanov (yellow card) 70'; S. Rahimov (yellow card) 81'	Stadium: Gabala City Stadium; Attendance: 900; Referee: Oerxan Mämmädov

12 September 2015 4	Kapaz	1 – 0	AZAL	Ganja
16:00 AZST (UTC+5)	Dário 28' (yellow card) 42'; Sytnik (yellow card) 81'; T.Rzayev (yellow card) 85'	Report	Kvirtia (yellow card) 43'; Jafarguliyev (yellow card) 73'; K.Mirzayev (yellow card) 87'	Stadium: Ganja City Stadium; Attendance: 13,200; Referee: Fariz Yusifov

20 September 2015 5	Kapaz	2 – 3	Qarabağ	Ganja
16:30 AZST (UTC+5)	B.Soltanov 49'; S.Aliyev (yellow card) 73'; S.Rahimov 90+3'	Report	Yunuszade (yellow card) 18'; Diniyev 38' (pen.); Armenteros 50'; Mammadov 74' (pen.); Richard (yellow card) 77'	Stadium: Ganja City Stadium; Attendance: 20,000; Referee: Elvin Äsgärov

25 September 2015 6	Inter Baku	1 – 0	Kapaz	Baku
19:00 AZST (UTC+5)	Hajiyev (yellow card) 45'; Martins 53' (yellow card) 69' (yellow-red card) 83'; Lomaia (yellow card) 85'	Report	B.Soltanov (yellow card) 41'; T.Akhundov (yellow card) 56'; B.Nasirov (yellow card) 56'; Dário (yellow card) 87'	Stadium: Inter Arena; Attendance: 500; Referee: Rauf Jabbarov

4 October 2015 7	Kapaz	3 – 1	Sumgayit	Ganja
16:00 AZST (UTC+5)	Juninho 10', 81'; B.Nasirov (yellow card) 34'; Eyyubov 90+2'	Report	J.Hajiyev (yellow card) 31'; Pamuk 69'; S.Alkhasov (yellow card) 74' (yellow-red card) 76'; R.Ramazanov (yellow card) 88'	Stadium: Ganja City Stadium; Attendance: 18,000; Referee: Ramil Diniyev

16 October 2015 8	Ravan Baku	0 – 2	Kapaz	Baku
20:30 AZST (UTC+5)	N.Mammadov (yellow card) 11' (yellow-red card) 87'; K.Manafov (yellow card) 33' (yellow-red card) 59'; Makhnovskyi (yellow card) 61'; O.Lalayev (yellow card) 75' (yellow-red card) 90+1'	Report	Dário (yellow card) 35'; Ebah 48'; Juninho 52'; S.Aliyev (yellow card) 61'; J.Javadov (yellow card) 78'; Eyyubov (yellow card) 84'	Stadium: Bayil Stadium; Attendance: 200; Referee: Orxan Mämmädov

24 October 2015 9	Kapaz	1 – 0	Khazar Lankaran	Ganja
15:00 AZST (UTC+5)	Dário 36'	Report		Stadium: Ganja City Stadium; Attendance: 18,000; Referee: Omar Paşayev

28 October 2015 10	Zira	2 – 2	Kapaz	Baku
17:00 AZT (UTC+4)	Bonilla 28', 37'; Mbah (yellow card) 41'; S.Guliyev (red card) 58'; A.Shemonayev (yellow card) 87' (yellow-red card) 87'; A.Nagiyev (yellow card) 89'; K.Bayramov (yellow card) 90+3'	Report	B.Soltanov 16' (yellow card) 41'; Juninho 74'	Stadium: Zira Olympic Sport Complex Stadium; Attendance: 2,000; Referee: Rahim Häsänov

31 October 2015^{2} 11	Gabala	1 – 2	Kapaz	Qabala
18:00 AZT (UTC+4)	Antonov (yellow card) 67'; Pereyra 69'	Report	Sytnik 2'; Eyyubov (yellow card) 65'; Simaitis (yellow card) 90+3'; Dário 90+4'	Stadium: Gabala City Stadium; Attendance: 300; Referee: Äliyar Ağayev

7 November 2015 12	AZAL	1 – 1	Kapaz	Baku
16:30 AZT (UTC+4)	Jafarguliyev (yellow card) 42'; T.Novruzov 88'; M.Badalbayli (yellow card) 90+2'	Report	S.Rahimov (yellow card) 39'; Ebah 82'; B.Soltanov (yellow card) 82'; T.Akhundov (yellow card) 83'; Eyyubov (yellow card) 90+1'	Stadium: AZAL Arena; Attendance: 400; Referee: Fariz Yusifov

21 November 2015 13	Qarabağ	3 – 0	Kapaz	Baku
19:30 AZT (UTC+4)	Chumbinho 36'; Yunuszade (yellow card) 71'; Quintana 83'; Richard 87'	Report	B.Nasirov (yellow card) 8'; T.Akhundov (yellow card) 85'	Stadium: Tofiq Bahramov Stadium^{1} Attendance: 850; Referee: Orxan Mämmädov

27 November 2015 14	Kapaz	0 – 0	Inter Baku	Ganja
14:00 AZT (UTC+4)	A.Karimov (yellow card) 27'; Eyyubov (yellow card) 44'	Report	Poljak (yellow card) 60'; Denis (yellow card) 85'; Khizanishvili (yellow card) 86'	Stadium: Ganja City Stadium; Attendance: 12,300; Referee: Rahim Häsänov

7 December 2015 15	Sumgayit	2 – 2	Kapaz	Sumqayit
17:00 AZT (UTC+4)	Hüseynov (yellow card) 28'; Chertoganov (yellow card) 42'; T.Mikayilov (yellow card) 51'; E.Mehdiyev 56'; A.Yunanov 78'; Mirzaga Huseynpur (yellow card) 81'	Report	Guliyev (yellow card) 44'; T.Rzayev (yellow card) 57'; B.Soltanov (yellow card) 58'; Sytnik (yellow card) 71' (goal) 76'; T.Akhundov 90+5' (pen.)	Stadium: Kapital Bank Arena; Attendance: 1,500; Referee: Fariz Yusifov

11 December 2015 16	Kapaz	0 – 0	Ravan Baku	Ganja
14:00 AZT (UTC+4)	A.Kärimov (yellow card) 66'	Report	O.Lalayev (yellow card) 34'; E.Hasanaliyev (yellow card) 52'; Suma (yellow card) 66'; N.Mammadov (yellow card) 90+4'	Stadium: Ganja City Stadium; Attendance: 11,000; Referee: Ingilab Mämmädov

17 December 2015 17	Khazar Lankaran	0 – 1	Kapaz	Lankaran
14:00 AZT (UTC+4)		Report	K.Diniyev (yellow card) 24'; S.Rahimov 65' (yellow card) 81'; B.Rahimov (yellow card) 67'; Ebah (yellow card) 70'; Eyyubov (yellow card) 79'	Stadium: Lankaran City Stadium; Attendance: 600; Referee: Rahim Häsänov

20 December 2015 18	Kapaz	1 – 1	Neftchi Baku	Ganja
14:00 AZT (UTC+4)	Guliyev 15'; B.Nasirov (yellow card) 36'; T.Narimanov (red card) 53'; A.Karimov (yellow card) 90+2'	Report	Ailton (yellow card) 32' (yellow-red card) 50'; Cauê (yellow card) 35'; Ramos (yellow card) 40'; Imamverdiyev 47' (yellow card) 85'; Qurbanov (yellow card) 51'; A.Mammadov (yellow card) 81'	Stadium: Ganja City Stadium; Attendance: 15,000; Referee: Omar Paşayev

30 January 2016 19	Kapaz	3 – 0	Gabala	Ganja
14:00 AZT (UTC+4)	Ebah 25', 75'; S.Aliyev (yellow card) 45+1'; Alasgarov 57'; B.Nasirov (yellow card) 82'	Report	Zec (yellow card) 78'	Stadium: Ganja City Stadium; Attendance: 9,000; Referee: Fariz Yusifov

7 February 2016 20	Kapaz	2 – 0	AZAL	Ganja
13:30 AZT (UTC+4)	B.Nasirov 28' (yellow card) 85'; Ebah 86'	Report	T.Novruzov (yellow card) 32' (yellow-red card) 88'	Stadium: Ganja City Stadium; Attendance: 12,000; Referee: Ravan Hämzäzadä

14 February 2016 21	Kapaz	1 – 2	Qarabağ	Ganja
15:00 AZT (UTC+4)	Alasgarov 44'; K.Diniyev (yellow card) 70'	Report	Sadygov 9'; Quintana (yellow card) 70'; Ismayilov 83'; Agolli (yellow card) 90+1'	Stadium: Ganja City Stadium; Attendance: 20,400; Referee: Omar Paşayev

19 February 2016 22	Inter Baku	1 – 0	Kapaz	Baku
15:00 AZT (UTC+4)	F.Bayramov (yellow card) 36'; Hajiyev 55'; Kvekveskiri (yellow card) 60'; Aghayev (yellow card) 80'; Fomenko (yellow card) 89'	Report	Alasgarov (yellow card) 68'; Ebah (yellow card) 88'	Stadium: Inter Arena; Attendance: 300; Referee: Fariz Yusifov

27 February 2016 23	Kapaz	0 – 0	Sumgayit	Ganja
14:00 AZT (UTC+4)	T.Akhundov (yellow card) 26'; Ebah (yellow card) 62'	Report	Chertoganov (yellow card) 37'; Ramaldanov (yellow card) 62'; Guluzade (yellow card) 66'; Ramazanov (yellow card) 75'	Stadium: Ganja City Stadium; Attendance: 13,500; Referee: Aliyar Ağayev

6 March 2016 24	Ravan Baku	1 – 3	Kapaz	Baku
16:00 AZT (UTC+4)	M.Quliyev 82'	Report	K.Diniyev 16'; Alasgarov 29'; B.Nasirov (yellow card) 36'; S.Rahimov (yellow card) 52'; Juninho 56'; S.Aliyev (yellow card) 75'	Stadium: Bayil Stadium; Attendance: 80; Referee: Elvin Əsgərov

13 March 2016 25	Kapaz	2 – 0	Khazar Lankaran	Ganja
15:00 AZT (UTC+4)	T.Narimanov 48'; B.Nasirov (yellow card) 75'; T.Rzayev 90+1'	Report	O.Sadigli (yellow card) 65'; Jalilov (yellow card) 77'	Stadium: Ganja City Stadium; Attendance: 12,750; Referee: Ravan Həmzəzadə

19 March 2016 26	Neftchi Baku	2 – 3	Kapaz	Baku
18:00 AZT (UTC+4)	A.Abdullayev (yellow card) 43' (goal) 60'; F.Muradbayli (yellow card) 43'; Qurbanov 81' (pen.); E.Abdullayev (yellow card) 89'	Report	B.Soltanov 31'; T.Akhundov 33' (pen.); B.Nasirov (yellow card) 43'; Ebah (yellow card) 65'; S.Aliyev (yellow card) 80'; Guliyev (yellow card) 83'; S.Rahimov 90+1'; Simaitis (yellow card) 90+1'	Stadium: Bakcell Arena; Attendance: 1,700; Referee: Rauf Cabbarov

30 March 2016 27	Kapaz	2 – 0	Zira	Ganja
15:00 AZT (UTC+4)	S.Aliyev (yellow card) 11'; B.Nasirov (yellow card) 51'; T.Akhundov 64' (pen.); T.Mutallimov 78' (o.g.)	Report	N.Gurbanov (yellow card) 56'; V.Igbekoi (yellow card) 62'	Stadium: Ganja City Stadium; Attendance: 12,000; Referee: Omar Paşayev

3 April 2016 28	AZAL	3 – 0	Kapaz	Baku
15:00 AZT (UTC+4)	A.Gasimov 36'; Ahmadov 64'; Mirzaga Huseynpur 90+3' (pen.)	Report	Juninho (yellow card) 52' (yellow-red card) 90+3'; T.Akhundov (yellow card) 67'; K.Diniyev (yellow card) 73'; S.Aliyev (yellow card) 90+3'	Stadium: AZAL Arena; Attendance: 600; Referee: Fariz Yusifov

8 April 2016 29	Qarabağ	4 – 0	Kapaz	Baku
17:30 AZT (UTC+4)	T.Akhundov 17' (o.g.); Míchel (yellow card) 32'; Quintana 43'; Sadygov (yellow card) 61'; M.Mädätov 62'; Armenteros 90+3'	Report	B.Nasirov (yellow card) 40'	Stadium: Azersun Arena; Attendance: 3,153; Referee: Rəhim Həsənov

15 April 2016 30	Kapaz	1 – 1	Inter Baku	Ganja
13:30 AZT (UTC+4)	T.Akhundov 32' (pen.)	Report	Nadirov (yellow card) 10'; E.Abdullayev (yellow card) 20'; Fomenko 56'	Stadium: Ganja City Stadium; Attendance: 11,300; Referee: Aliyar Ağayev

24 April 2016 31	Sumgayit	2 – 3	Kapaz	Sumqayit
14:00 AZT (UTC+4)	Agayev 22'; Fardjad-Azad (yellow card) 32'; A.Yunanov 73'	Report	S.Rahimov (yellow card) 27'; K.Diniyev (yellow card) 29'; Fardjad-Azad 45+1'; Juninho 59'; Ebah 60'; T.Akhundov (yellow card) 76'	Stadium: Kapital Bank Arena; Attendance: 1,400; Referee: Rauf Jabbarov

30 April 2016 32	Kapaz	3 – 2	Ravan Baku	Ganja
15:00 AZT (UTC+4)	Ebah 10'; Alasgarov (yellow card) 42'; K.Muslumov 47' (o.g.); T.Akhundov 61' (pen.)	Report	Abbasov 40' (pen.); R.Tagizade (yellow card) 42'; M.Quliyev (yellow card) 55'; K.Muslumov (yellow card) 60'; E.Abdulov 89'	Stadium: Ganja City Stadium; Attendance: 8,100; Referee: Ravan Həmzəzadə

7 May 2016 33	Khazar Lankaran	0 – 3	Kapaz	Lankaran
16:00 AZT (UTC+4)	O.Safiyaroglu (yellow card) 82'	Report	K.Diniyev 42'; Ebah 48'; S.Rahimov (yellow card) 55'; O.Əliyev (yellow card) 77' (goal) 79'	Stadium: Lankaran City Stadium; Attendance: 900; Referee: Omar Paşayev

11 May 2016 34	Kapaz	1 – 2	Neftchi Baku	Ganja
16:00 AZT (UTC+4)	Ebah 5'; T.Akhundov (yellow card) 38'; B.Nasirov (yellow card) 68'; S.Rahimov (yellow card) 79'; Guliyev (yellow card) 88' (yellow-red card) 90'	Summary	Jairo (yellow card) 41'; Añete 49'; Qurbanov 80' (pen.); E.Abdullayev (yellow card) 90+2'	Stadium: Ganja City Stadium; Attendance: 12,000; Referee: Fariz Yusifov

15 May 2016 35	Zira	2 – 2	Kapaz	Baku
18:00 AZT (UTC+4)	Mbah (yellow card) 40'; Mammadov (yellow card) 53' (goal) 69'; N.Novruzov (yellow card) 85'; Krneta (yellow card) 89'; N.Gurbanov 90+2'; E.Nəbiyev (yellow card) 90+2'; Bonilla (yellow card) 90+3'	Report	O.Əliyev 26'; K.Diniyev (yellow card) 41'; B.Nasirov (yellow card) 67'; B.Soltanov 75'	Stadium: Zira Olympic Sport Complex Stadium; Attendance: 800; Referee: Rauf Jabbarov

20 May 2016 36	Kapaz	0 – 1	Gabala	Ganja
17:00 AZT (UTC+4)	B.Nasirov (yellow card) 17'; S.Rahimov (yellow card) 88'	Report	A.Mammadov (yellow card) 14'; S.Zargarov (yellow card) 27'; Antonov (yellow card) 39'; Gai 76' (yellow card) 90+1'; Vernydub (yellow card) 80'	Stadium: Ganja City Stadium; Attendance: 9,000; Referee: Rahim Həsənov

==== League table ====
Pos	Team	Pld	W	D	L	GF	GA	GD	Pts	Qualification or relegation
3	Gabala	36	16	11	9	44	28	+16	59 (Note: Gabala ahead of Inter Baku on head-to-head record: Inter Baku–Gabala 2–1, Gabala–Inter Baku 1–1, Inter Baku–Gabala 0–1, Gabala–Inter Baku 0–0.)	Qualification for the Europa League first qualifying round
4	Inter Baku (Note: On 31 March 2016, the Adjudicatory Chamber of the UEFA Club Financial Control Body (CFCB) announced that Inter Baku will be excluded from participating in the next UEFA club competition for which they would otherwise qualify in the next three seasons (i.e. the 2016/17, 2017/18 and 2018/19 seasons).)	36	16	11	9	39	28	+11	59	
5	Kapaz	36	15	11	10	48	40	+8	56	Qualification for the Europa League first qualifying round
6	Neftçi Baku	36	13	10	13	41	41	0	49	Qualification for the Europa League first qualifying round
7	AZAL	36	13	7	16	26	38	−12	46	

Source: PFL, UEFA, Soccerway
Rules for classification: 1) Points; 2) Head-to-head points; 3) Head-to-head goal difference; 4) Head-to-head goals scored; 5) Head-to-head away goals scored (only if two teams); 6) Goal difference; 7) Goals scored.

=== Azerbaijan Cup ===
2 December 2015 Second Round	Khazar Lankaran	1 – 0	Kapaz	Lankaran
17:00 AZT (UTC+4)	K.Abdullazadä 14' (yellow card) 90+1'; Amirguliyev (yellow card) 42'; Rzazade (yellow card) 84'; O.Sadıqlı (yellow card) 87'; Jalilov (yellow card) 90+5'	Summary	T.Akhundov (yellow card) 76'	Stadium: Lankaran City Stadium; Attendance: 3,500; Referee: Elvin Äsgärov

== Squad statistics ==
As of Match played 20 May 2016

=== Appearances and goals ===
No.	Pos	Nat	Player	Total		Premier League		Azerbaijan Cup	
No.	Pos	Nat	Player	Apps	Goals	Apps	Goals	Apps	Goals
1	GK	(Azerbaijan) AZE	Eyyub Aliyev	1	0	0+1	0	0	0
3	DF	(Azerbaijan) AZE	Tarlan Guliyev	36	2	35	2	1	0
4	MF	(Azerbaijan) AZE	Elvin Jabrayilli	1	0	0+1	0	0	0
5	DF	(Azerbaijan) AZE	Karim Diniyev	31	2	29+1	2	1	0
6	MF	(Azerbaijan) AZE	Jeyhun Javadov	17	0	2+15	0	0	0
7	MF	(Brazil) BRA	Juninho	34	6	33	6	0+1	0
8	MF	(Azerbaijan) AZE	Budag Nasirov	34	1	33	1	0+1	0
9	MF	(Azerbaijan) AZE	Namig Alasgarov	15	3	15	3	0	0
10	FW	(Brazil) BRA	Dário	12	3	12	3	0	0
13	MF	(Azerbaijan) AZE	Shahriyar Rahimov	35	4	34	4	1	0
15	DF	(Azerbaijan) AZE	Azad Karimov	25	0	7+17	0	1	0
18	DF	(Azerbaijan) AZE	Tural Akhundov	36	4	35	4	1	0
19	MF	(Azerbaijan) AZE	Orxan Əliyev	12	2	7+5	2	0	0
21	DF	(Azerbaijan) AZE	Xazar Qəribov	1	0	0+1	0	0	0
23	DF	(Azerbaijan) AZE	Tural Narimanov	12	1	6+5	1	1	0
25	DF	(Azerbaijan) AZE	Shahriyar Aliyev	32	0	32	0	0	0
27	FW	(Azerbaijan) AZE	Bakhtiyar Soltanov	36	4	23+12	4	1	0
80	MF	(Azerbaijan) AZE	Tural Rzayev	31	1	11+19	1	1	0
88	GK	(Lithuania) LTU	Tadas Simaitis	38	0	36	0	2	0
90	FW	(Cameroon) CMR	Julien Ebah	29	9	21+7	9	0+1	0
99	MF	(Azerbaijan) AZE	Ali Samadov	1	0	0+1	0	0	0
Players who appeared for Kapaz but left during the season:
9	MF	(Azerbaijan) AZE	Murad Aghakishiyev	4	0	0+4	0	0	0
19	FW	(Ukraine) UKR	Oleksandr Sytnik	17	2	10+6	2	1	0
68	FW	(Azerbaijan) AZE	Rashad Eyyubov	14	1	13	1	1	0

=== Goal scorers ===
Place	Position	Nation	Number	Name	Premier League	Azerbaijan Cup	Total
1	FW	(Cameroon)	90	Julien Ebah	9	0	9
2	MF	(Brazil)	7	Juninho	6	0	6
3	MF	(Azerbaijan)	13	Shahriyar Rahimov	4	0	4
3	DF	(Azerbaijan)	3	Tarlan Guliyev	4	0	4
3	FW	(Azerbaijan)	27	Bakhtiyar Soltanov	4	0	4
6	FW	(Brazil)	10	Dário	3	0	3
6	MF	(Azerbaijan)	9	Namig Alasgarov	3	0	3
6				Own goal	3	0	3
9	FW	(Ukraine)	19	Oleksandr Sytnik	2	0	2
9	DF	(Azerbaijan)	18	Tural Akhundov	2	0	2
9	DF	(Azerbaijan)	5	Karim Diniyev	2	0	2
9	MF	(Azerbaijan)	19	Orxan Əliyev	2	0	2
13	FW	(Azerbaijan)	68	Rashad Eyyubov	1	0	1
13	MF	(Azerbaijan)	8	Budag Nasirov	1	0	1
13	DF	(Azerbaijan)	23	Tural Narimanov	1	0	1
13	MF	(Azerbaijan)	80	Tural Rzayev	1	0	1
				TOTALS	48	0	48

=== Disciplinary record ===
Number	Nation	Position	Name	Premier League		Azerbaijan Cup		Total	
Number	Nation	Position	Name	Yellow card	Red card	Yellow card	Red card	Yellow card	Red card
3	(Azerbaijan)	DF	Tarlan Guliyev	4	1	0	0	4	1
5	(Azerbaijan)	DF	Karim Diniyev	5	0	0	0	5	0
6	(Azerbaijan)	MF	Jeyhun Javadov	1	0	0	0	1	0
7	(Brazil)	MF	Juninho	3	1	0	0	3	1
8	(Azerbaijan)	MF	Budag Nasirov	16	0	0	0	16	0
9	(Azerbaijan)	MF	Murad Aghakishiyev	2	0	0	0	2	0
9	(Azerbaijan)	MF	Namig Alasgarov	2	0	0	0	2	0
10	(Brazil)	FW	Dário	3	0	0	0	3	0
13	(Azerbaijan)	MF	Shahriyar Rahimov	8	0	0	0	8	0
15	(Azerbaijan)	DF	Azad Karimov	3	0	0	0	3	0
16	(Azerbaijan)	DF	Tural Akhundov	0	0	1	0	1	0
18	(Azerbaijan)	DF	Tural Akhundov	7	0	0	0	7	0
19	(Ukraine)	FW	Oleksandr Sytnik	2	0	0	0	2	0
19	(Azerbaijan)	MF	Orxan Əliyev	1	0	0	0	1	0
23	(Azerbaijan)	DF	Tural Narimanov	1	1	0	0	1	1
25	(Azerbaijan)	DF	Shahriyar Aliyev	9	1	0	0	9	1
27	(Azerbaijan)	FW	Bakhtiyar Soltanov	5	0	0	0	5	0
68	(Azerbaijan)	FW	Rashad Eyyubov	5	0	0	0	5	0
80	(Azerbaijan)	MF	Tural Rzayev	2	0	0	0	2	0
88	(Lithuania)	GK	Tadas Simaitis	2	0	0	0	2	0
90	(Cameroon)	FW	Julien Ebah	4	0	0	0	4	0
			TOTALS	85	4	1	0	86	4

== Notes ==
- Qarabağ have played their home games at the Tofiq Bahramov Stadium since 1993 due to the ongoing situation in Quzanlı.
- The match between Gabala and Kapaz on 31 October 2015, was suspended in 29th minute due to server fog. The remainder of the game was played the next day, 1 November 2015, at 20:00.
