= Mushfig Rzayev =

Azerbaijani footballer (born 1998)

Personal information
- Full name: Mushfig Nazir oglu Rzayev
- Date of birth: 23 March 1998 (age 28)
- Height: 1.76 m (5 ft 9 1/2 in)
- Position: Midfielder

Team information
- Current team: Sumgayit
- Number: 38

Senior career*
Years	Team	Apps	(Gls)
2016–2017	Solyaris Moscow	7	(0)
2017–	Sumgayit	0	(0)
- * Club domestic league appearances and goals as of 14 September 2017

Mushfig Nazir ogly Rzayev (Azerbaijani: Müşfiq Nazir oğlu Rzayev; born 23 March 1998) is an Azerbaijani football player who plays for Azerbaijan Premier League side Sumgayit.

== Club career ==
He made his debut in the Russian Professional Football League for FC Solyaris Moscow on 4 August 2016 in a game against FC Spartak Kostroma.

== Career statistics ==
=== Club ===
As of match played 4 June 2017

Appearances and goals by club, season and competition
Club	Season	League			National Cup		League Cup		Continental		Other		Total	
Club	Season	Division	Apps	Goals	Apps	Goals	Apps	Goals	Apps	Goals	Apps	Goals	Apps	Goals
Solyaris Moscow	2016–17	Russian Football League	7	0	1	0	–		–		–		8	0
Sumgayit	2017–18	Azerbaijan Premier League	0	0	0	0	–		–		–		0	0
Career total			7	0	1	0	-	-	-	-	-	-	8	0
