= Tadas Simaitis =

Lithuanian footballer

Personal information
- Full name: Tadas Simaitis
- Date of birth: 29 December 1990 (age 35)
- Place of birth: Klaipėda, Lithuania
- Height: 1.87 m (6 ft 1 1/2 in)
- Position: Goalkeeper

Team information
- Current team: FK Riteriai
- Number: 88

Senior career*
Years	Team	Apps	(Gls)
2008–2012	Šiauliai	22	(0)
2012–2014	Oțelul Galați	5	(0)
2014	Kruoja	0	(0)
2015	Granitas	18	(0)
2015–2017	Kapaz	53	(0)
2017–2018	Jonava	9	(0)
2019	Hegelmann Litauen	15	(0)
2019–	FK Riteriai	27	(0)

International career^{‡}
2006–2007	Lithuania U17	2	(0)
2008–2009	Lithuania U19	3	(0)
- * Club domestic league appearances and goals as of 3 October 2020 ‡ National team caps and goals as of 14 June 2016

Tadas Simaitis (born 29 December 1990) is a Lithuanian footballer who plays as a goalkeeper for Jonava.

== Career ==
He started his career in Šiauliai.

On 20 February 2012, he was transferred from Šiauliai to Romanian club Oțelul Galați. On 23 November 2012, Simaitis made his debut for the Romanian side, in Liga I game against Dinamo București.

In June 2015, Simaitis signed with Azerbaijan Premier League side Kapaz.

Signed a contract with FK Jonava on 14 July 2017, during the summer transfers.

From July 2018 he is FK Jonava sports director.

== Career statistics ==
=== Club ===
As of match played 9 February 2017

Appearances and goals by club, season and competition
Club	Season	League			National Cup		League Cup		Continental		Other		Total	
Club	Season	Division	Apps	Goals	Apps	Goals	Apps	Goals	Apps	Goals	Apps	Goals	Apps	Goals
Kruoja Pakruojis	2014	A Lyga	0	0	0	0	–		–		–		0	0
Klaipėdos Granitas	2015	A Lyga	18	0	0	0	–		–		–		18	0
Kapaz	2015–16	APL	36	0	2	0	–		–		–		38	0
Kapaz	2016–17	APL	17	0	2	0	–		4	0	–		23	0
Kapaz	Total		53	0	4	0	-	-	4	0	-	-	61	0
Career total			71	0	4	0	-	-	4	0	-	-	79	0
