= Julien Ebah =

Cameroonian footballer

Personal information
- Full name: Julien Jérôme Ebah Tobie
- Date of birth: 27 September 1990 (age 36)
- Place of birth: Yaoundé, Cameroon
- Height: 1.80 m (5 ft 11 in)
- Position: Striker

Senior career*
Years	Team	Apps	(Gls)
2009–2011	Les Astres		
2011–2013	New Star		
2013	Union Douala		
2014	Les Astres		
2015	New Star	30	(16)
2015–2017	Kapaz	56	(15)
2017–2018	Al-Khor	5	(0)
2018–2019	Al-Shoulla	16	(3)

International career^{‡}
2012–	Cameroon	4	(1)
- * Club domestic league appearances and goals as of 7 January 2018 ‡ National team caps and goals as of 30 November 2015

Julien Jérôme Ebah Tobie (born 27 September 1990) is a Cameroonian professional footballer who plays as a striker.

== Career ==
In 2015 season Ebah became Top scorer of Cameroonian Premier League with 16 goals. In September 2015, Ebah signed for Azerbaijan Premier League side Kapaz PFK. His first goal against Ravan FC in October 2015 was selected as Azerbaijan Premier League best goal of the first half of the season 2015/2016. He scored another fantastic goal for Kapaz PFC against Azal FC on 7 February 2016. Ebah left Kapaz on 26 May 2017.

== Career statistics ==
=== Club ===
As of match played 29 April 2017

Appearances and goals by club, season and competition
Club	Season	League			National Cup		League Cup		Continental		Other		Total	
Club	Season	Division	Apps	Goals	Apps	Goals	Apps	Goals	Apps	Goals	Apps	Goals	Apps	Goals
Kapaz	2015–16	APL	28	9	1	0	–		–		–		29	9
Kapaz	2016–17	APL	28	6	2	0	–		4	0	–		34	6
Kapaz	Total		56	15	3	0	-	-	4	0	-	-	63	15
Career total			56	15	3	0	-	-	4	0	-	-	63	15

=== International ===
Cameroon national team
Year	Apps	Goals
2013	4	1
Total	4	1

Statistics accurate as of match played 30 August 2013
