= Ramil Hasanov =

Ukrainian footballer

Personal information
- Full name: Ramil Safarovych Hasanov
- Date of birth: 15 February 1996 (age 30)
- Place of birth: AR Crimea, Ukraine
- Height: 1.90 m (6 ft 3 in)
- Position: Striker

Team information
- Current team: Rubin Yalta

Youth career
- 2009–2013: Tavriya Simferopol

Senior career*
Years	Team	Apps	(Gls)
2013–2014	Tavriya Simferopol	0	(0)
2014–2018	Gabala	1	(0)
2017	→ Sumgayit (loan)	4	(0)
2018	→ Khazar Baku (loan)		
2018–2019	1074 Cankiri Spor	13	(7)
2019	Sultangazi Spor	8	(6)
2019–2020	Inkomsport Yalta		
2020–	Rubin Yalta		
- * Club domestic league appearances and goals as of 21 May 2018

Ramil Hasanov (Ukrainian: Раміль Сафарович Гасанов; born 15 February 1996) is a professional Ukrainian football striker who plays on loan for Rubin Yalta.

== Career ==
Hasanov is a product of SC Tavriya youth sportive school system. He played in the Ukrainian Premier League Reserves for SC Tavriya and after dissolution of the club, in November 2014 signed 3 years contract with the Azerbaijani club Gabala FK.

In June 2017 he went on loan for one year in other Azerbaijan Premier League's club Sumgayit FK, but in December 2017 returned to his club.

== Career statistics ==
=== Club ===
As of match played 1 January 2018

Appearances and goals by club, season and competition
Club	Season	League			National Cup		Continental		Other		Total	
Club	Season	Division	Apps	Goals	Apps	Goals	Apps	Goals	Apps	Goals	Apps	Goals
Gabala	2014–15	Azerbaijan Premier League	0	0	0	0	0	0	–		0	0
Gabala	2015–16	Azerbaijan Premier League	0	0	0	0	0	0	–		0	0
Gabala	2016–17	Azerbaijan Premier League	1	0	1	0	0	0	–		2	0
Gabala	2017–18	Azerbaijan Premier League	0	0	0	0	0	0	–		0	0
Gabala	Total		1	0	1	0	0	0	-	-	2	0
Sumgayit (loan)	2017–18	Azerbaijan Premier League	4	0	1	0	–		–		5	0
Career total			5	0	1	0	0	0	-	-	7	0
