= Galip Güzel =

Turkish footballer

Personal information
- Date of birth: 10 January 1987 (age 39)
- Place of birth: Merzifon, Turkey
- Height: 1.70 m (5 ft 7 in)
- Position: Attacking midfielder

Team information
- Current team: Kuşadasıspor
- Number: 5

Senior career*
Years	Team	Apps	(Gls)
2009–2011	Bandırmaspor	65	(16)
2011–2013	Bugsaşspor	55	(11)
2013–2016	Osmanlıspor	70	(14)
2016	→ Alanyaspor (loan)	19	(3)
2016–2018	Sivasspor	36	(5)
2018	Çaykur Rizespor	14	(1)
2018–2019	Adana Demirspor	16	(3)
2019	Osmanlıspor	10	(2)
2019	Menemenspor	5	(0)
2020	Manisa FK	4	(0)
2020–2021	Şanlıurfaspor	31	(1)
2021–	Kuşadasıspor	22	(3)
- * Club domestic league appearances and goals as of 13 November 2022

Galip Güzel (born 10 January 1987) is a Turkish footballer who plays as a midfielder for Kuşadasıspor.

== Trophies ==
1x 1.Lig runners-up medal
