= Ebrahim Abednezhad =

Iranian footballer

Personal information
- Full name: Ebrahim Abednezhad
- Date of birth: 22 August 1992 (age 34)
- Place of birth: Tabriz, Iran
- Height: 1.73 m (5 ft 8 in)
- Position: Attacking midfielder

Team information
- Current team: Serinhisarspor

Youth career
- 2012–2014: Tractor

Senior career*
| Years | Team | Apps | (Gls) |
| 2013–2016 | Tractor | 2 | (0) |
| 2014–2015 | → Machine Sazi (loan) | 0 | (0) |
| 2016–2017 | Sumgayit | 5 | (0) |
| 2017–2018 | Alaşehir Belediyespor | | |
| 2018– | Serinhisarspor | 22 | (1) |
- * Club domestic league appearances and goals as of 3 July 2019

Ebrahim Abednezhad (Persian: ابراهیم عابدنژاد, born 22 August 1992) is an Iranian footballer who plays as an attacking midfielder.

== Career statistics ==
As of match played 3 July 2019

Appearances and goals by club, season and competition
| Club | Season | League | | | Cup | | Continental | | Total | |
| Club | Season | Division | Apps | Goals | Apps | Goals | Apps | Goals | Apps | Goals |
|---|---|---|---|---|---|---|---|---|---|---|
| Tractor | 2012–13 | Persian Gulf Pro League | 1 | 0 | 0 | 0 | 0 | 0 | 1 | 0 |
| Tractor | 2013–14 | Persian Gulf Pro League | 1 | 0 | 0 | 0 | 2 | 0 | 3 | 0 |
| Tractor | 2014–15 | Persian Gulf Pro League | 0 | 0 | 0 | 0 | — | | 0 | 0 |
| Tractor | 2015–16 | Persian Gulf Pro League | 0 | 0 | 0 | 0 | 0 | 0 | 0 | 0 |
| Tractor | Total | | 2 | 0 | 0 | 0 | 2 | 0 | 4 | 0 |
| Sumgayit | 2016–17 | Azerbaijan Premier League | 5 | 0 | 0 | 0 | — | | 5 | 0 |
| Career total | | | 7 | 0 | 0 | 0 | 2 | 0 | 9 | 0 |
