= Oleksandr Sytnik =

Ukrainian footballer

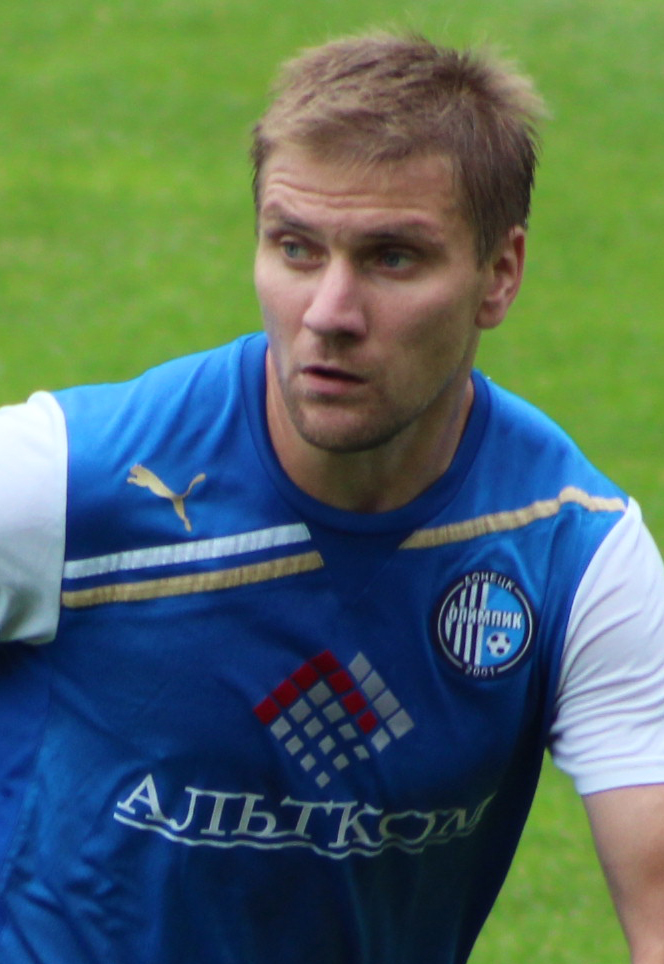

Personal information
- Full name: Oleksandr Sytnik
- Date of birth: 7 July 1984 (age 42)
- Place of birth: Novomoskovsk, Ukraine
- Height: 1.84 m (6 ft 0 in)
- Position: Forward

Youth career
- Shakhtar Youth

Senior career*
| Years | Team | Apps | (Gls) |
| 2001–2004 | Shakhtar Donetsk | 0 | (0) |
| 2001–2003 | → Shakhtar-2 Donetsk | 13 | (0) |
| 2002–2004 | → Shakhtar-3 Donetsk | 31 | (3) |
| 2004–2007 | Stal Dniprodzerzhynsk | 83 | (19) |
| 2007–2009 | Metalurh Donetsk | 31 | (2) |
| 2009 | Zakarpattia Uzhhorod | 4 | (0) |
| 2010–2011 | Zirka Kirovohrad | 29 | (8) |
| 2011–2012 | Stal Dniprodzerzhynsk | 20 | (0) |
| 2012 | Kaisar | 12 | (2) |
| 2013–2015 | Olimpik Donetsk | 60 | (11) |
| 2015 | Kapaz | 17 | (2) |
| 2016 | Hirnyk Kryvyi Rih | 5 | (0) |
- * Club domestic league appearances and goals

Oleksandr Sytnik (born 7 July 1984) is a professional Ukrainian football striker. He spent time with Metalurh Donetsk after a summer transfer season of 2007 from FC Stal Kamianske. In 2009, he played several games for FC Hoverla Uzhhorod and in April 2010 signed with FC Zirka Kropyvnytskyi.
