= Serginho (footballer, born 1991) =

Portuguese footballer

Personal information
- Full name: Sérgio Manuel Costa Carneiro
- Date of birth: 21 February 1991 (age 35)
- Place of birth: Trofa, Portugal
- Height: 1.75 m (5 ft 9 in)
- Position: Attacking midfielder

Youth career
- 2000–2005: Trofense
- 2005–2008: Porto
- 2006–2007: → Padroense (loan)
- 2008–2010: Trofense

Senior career*
| Years | Team | Apps | (Gls) |
| 2010–2011 | Trofense | 24 | (2) |
| 2011–2013 | Beira-Mar | 38 | (4) |
| 2013–2015 | Arouca | 26 | (3) |
| 2015 | → Trofense (loan) | 14 | (0) |
| 2015–2016 | Trofense | 31 | (8) |
| 2016–2017 | Kapaz | 27 | (2) |
| 2017–2019 | Trofense | 44 | (4) |
| 2019–2020 | Ribeirão | 19 | (1) |
| Total | | 223 | (24) |

International career
| 2011 | Portugal U20 | 5 | (0) |
Medal record
Men's football
Representing Portugal
FIFA U-20 World Cup
| Runner-up | 2011 Colombia |
- * Club domestic league appearances and goals

Sérgio Manuel Costa Carneiro CvIH (born 21 February 1991), known as Serginho, is a Portuguese former professional footballer who played as a forward.

== Club career ==
Born in Trofa, Porto District, Serginho spent the better part of his ten-year youth career with local club C.D. Trofense. He made his senior debut in the Segunda Liga, then signed with S.C. Beira-Mar from the Primeira Liga in the summer of 2011.

Serginho's first game in the top division occurred on 11 September 2011, as he came as a late substitute in a 0–1 home loss against U.D. Leiria. He finished the season with a further 14 games, scoring in the 3–1 away win over C.D. Feirense as his team went on to finish in 12th position.

Serginho joined F.C. Arouca for 2013–14, as the side were experiencing their first-ever campaign in the top flight. He started in six of his 24 appearances, scoring against C.S. Marítimo (1–2 home defeat), S.L. Benfica (2–2 away draw) and Vitória de Guimarães (3–2 away victory) in an eventual escape from relegation.

In the last minutes of the 2015 January transfer window, Serginho rejoined Trofense on loan. The move was made permanent in July, after their relegation from the second tier and the expiration of his contract to Arouca.

On 13 June 2016, Serginho signed for Azerbaijan Premier League club Kapaz PFK, returning to Trofense a year later. He retired shortly after his 29th birthday not having been able to fully recover from a serious knee injury contracted in 2014, going on to work at the Mabor tire company.

== International career ==
Serginho was part of the Portugal squad at the 2011 FIFA U-20 World Cup in Colombia, being an unused squad member for the eventual runners-up.

== Honours ==
Portugal U20

- FIFA U-20 World Cup runner-up: 2011

Orders

- Knight of the Order of Prince Henry
