= Dário Júnior =

Brazilian footballer (born 1991)

Personal information
- Full name: Dário Frederico da Silva
- Date of birth: September 11, 1991 (age 35)
- Place of birth: Marília, Brazil
- Height: 1.87 m (6 ft 2 in)
- Position: Winger

Team information
- Current team: Al-Ahli

Senior career*
| Years | Team | Apps | (Gls) |
| 2012–2014 | AA Flamengo | 51 | (8) |
| 2012 | → Marília (loan) | 2 | (0) |
| 2014–2015 | Trofense | 41 | (3) |
| 2015–2017 | Kapaz | 34 | (7) |
| 2017 | Seongnam | | |
| 2018 | Kapaz | 13 | (4) |
| 2018 | Neftçi | 14 | (3) |
| 2019 | Daegu | 3 | (0) |
| 2019–2020 | Neftçi | 17 | (1) |
| 2020–2021 | Riga | 8 | (0) |
| 2021 | Hồ Chí Minh City | 8 | (1) |
| 2022–2023 | Singida United | | |
| 2023–2024 | Rajasthan United | 10 | (0) |
| 2024– | Al-Ahli | 0 | (0) |
- * Club domestic league appearances and goals

Dário Frederico da Silva (born 11 September 1991), commonly known as Dário or Dário Júnior, is a Brazilian professional footballer who plays as a winger for Bahraini Premier League club Al-Ahli.

== Career ==
In July 2014, Dário Júnior signed a two-year contract with Portuguese Segunda Liga side C.D. Trofense. A year later, Dário Júnior signed for newly promoted Azerbaijan Premier League side Kapaz. On 26 January 2018, Dário Júnior returned to Kapaz, signing a one-year contract.

On 11 June 2018, Dário Júnior signed a one-year contract with Neftçi.

On 30 January 2019 Neftçi announced that they had sold Dário Júnior to Daegu.

On 14 June 2019, Dário Júnior returned to Neftçi on a two-year deal from Daegu. On 10 July 2020, Dário was released by Neftçi after his contract was terminated by mutual consent.

On 23 July 2020, Dário Júnior signed contract with Riga FC.

== Career statistics ==
As of match played 22 December 2023

| Club | Season | League | | | National Cup | | League Cup | | Continental | | Total | |
| Club | Season | Division | Apps | Goals | Apps | Goals | Apps | Goals | Apps | Goals | Apps | Goals |
|---|---|---|---|---|---|---|---|---|---|---|---|---|
| AA Flamengo | 2012 | Paulista Série A3 | 15 | 2 | – | | – | | – | | 15 | 2 |
| AA Flamengo | 2013 | Paulista Série A3 | 20 | 4 | – | | – | | – | | 20 | 4 |
| AA Flamengo | 2014 | Paulista Série A3 | 16 | 2 | – | | – | | – | | 16 | 2 |
| AA Flamengo | Total | | 51 | 8 | 0 | 0 | 0 | 0 | 0 | 0 | 51 | 8 |
| Marília (loan) | 2012 | Série D | 2 | 0 | – | | – | | – | | 2 | 0 |
| Trofense | 2014–15 | Segunda Liga | 41 | 3 | 1 | 0 | 5 | 0 | – | | 47 | 3 |
| Kapaz | 2015–16 | Azerbaijan Premier League | 12 | 3 | 0 | 0 | – | | – | | 12 | 3 |
| Kapaz | 2016–17 | Azerbaijan Premier League | 22 | 4 | 1 | 0 | – | | 4 | 1 | 27 | 5 |
| Kapaz | Total | | 34 | 7 | 1 | 0 | 0 | 0 | 4 | 1 | 39 | 8 |
| Seongnam | 2017 | K League 2 | 0 | 0 | 0 | 0 | – | | – | | 0 | 0 |
| Kapaz | 2017–18 | Azerbaijan Premier League | 13 | 4 | 0 | 0 | – | | – | | 13 | 4 |
| Neftçi | 2018–19 | Azerbaijan Premier League | 14 | 3 | 1 | 0 | – | | 2 | 0 | 17 | 3 |
| Daegu | 2019 | K League 1 | 3 | 0 | 0 | 0 | – | | 2 | 0 | 5 | 0 |
| Neftçi | 2019–20 | Azerbaijan Premier League | 17 | 1 | 2 | 0 | – | | 6 | 3 | 25 | 4 |
| Riga | 2020 | Virslīga | 8 | 0 | 1 | 0 | – | | 1 | 0 | 10 | 0 |
| Ho Chi Minh City | 2021 | V.League 1 | 8 | 1 | – | | – | | – | | 8 | 1 |
| Rajasthan United | 2023–24 | I-League | 10 | 0 | – | | – | | – | | 10 | 0 |
| Al-Ahli | 2023–24 | Bahraini Premier League | 0 | 0 | – | | – | | – | | 0 | 0 |
| Career total | | | 201 | 27 | 6 | 0 | 5 | 0 | 15 | 4 | 227 | 31 |
