= Gabala SC in European football =

Overview of Gabala SC's role in European football

Gabala SC in European Football
- Club: Gabala SC
- Seasons played: 8
- Most appearances: Dmytro Bezotosnyi (32)
- Top scorer: Sergei Zenjov (6)
- First entry: 2014–15 UEFA Europa League
- Latest entry: 2023–24 UEFA Europa Conference League

Gabala SC has participated in 8 editions of the club competitions governed by UEFA, the chief authority for football across Europe. These include six seasons in the Europa League and two seasons in the Europa Conference League

== History ==
=== Matches ===
As of match played 3 August 2023

Season	Competition	Round	Club	Home	Away	Aggregate	Ref.
2014–15	UEFA Europa League	1Q	(Bosnia and Herzegovina) Široki Brijeg	0–2	0–3	0–5	
2015–16	UEFA Europa League	1Q	(Georgia (country)) Dinamo Tbilisi	2–0	1–2	3–2	
2015–16	UEFA Europa League	2Q	(Serbia) Čukarički	2–0	0–1	2–1	
2015–16	UEFA Europa League	3Q	(Cyprus) Apollon Limassol	1–0	1–1	2–1	
2015–16	UEFA Europa League	PO	(Greece) Panathinaikos	0–0	2–2	2–2 (a)	
2015–16	UEFA Europa League	Group C	(Germany) Borussia Dortmund	1–3	0–4	4th	
2015–16	UEFA Europa League	Group C	(Greece) PAOK	0–0	0–0	4th	
2015–16	UEFA Europa League	Group C	(Russia) Krasnodar	0–3	1–2	4th	
2016–17	UEFA Europa League	1Q	(Georgia (country)) Samtredia	5–1	1–2	6–3	
2016–17	UEFA Europa League	2Q	(Hungary) MTK Budapest	2–0	2–1	4–1	
2016–17	UEFA Europa League	3Q	(France) Lille	1–0	1–1	2–1	
2016–17	UEFA Europa League	PO	(Slovenia) Maribor	3–1	0–1	3–2	
2016–17	UEFA Europa League	Group C	(Belgium) Anderlecht	1–3	1–3	4th	
2016–17	UEFA Europa League	Group C	(France) Saint-Étienne	1–2	0–1	4th	
2016–17	UEFA Europa League	Group C	(Germany) Mainz 05	2–3	0–2	4th	
2017–18	UEFA Europa League	2Q	(Poland) Jagiellonia Białystok	1–1	2–0	3–1	
2017–18	UEFA Europa League	3Q	(Greece) Panathinaikos	1–2	0–1	1–3	
2018–19	UEFA Europa League	1Q	(Luxembourg) Progrès Niederkorn	0–2	1–0	1–2	
2019–20	UEFA Europa League	2Q	(Georgia (country)) Dinamo Tbilisi	0–2	0–3	0–5	
2022–23	UEFA Europa Conference League	2Q	(Hungary) Fehérvár	2–1	1–4	3–5	
2023–24	UEFA Europa Conference League	2Q	(Cyprus) Omonia	2–3	1–4	3–7	

Notes

- 1Q: First qualifying round
- 2Q: Second qualifying round
- 3Q: Third qualifying round
- PO: Play-off round
- Group: Group stage

== Player statistics ==
=== Appearances ===
As of match played 3 August 2023

	Name	Years	UEFA Champions League	UEFA Europa League	UEFA Europa Conference League	Total	Ratio
1	(Ukraine) Dmytro Bezotosnyi	2015-2019	(-)	32 (0)	(-)	32 (0)	0
2	(Serbia) Vojislav Stanković	2016-2019	(-)	29 (1)	(-)	29 (1)	0.03
3	(Estonia) Sergei Zenjov	2015-2017	(-)	27 (7)	(-)	27 (7)	0.26
3	(Brazil) Ricardinho	2015-2017	(-)	27 (1)	(-)	27 (1)	0.04
5	(Ukraine) Vitaliy Vernydub	2015-2018	(-)	26 (1)	(-)	26 (1)	0.04
6	(Azerbaijan) Asif Mammadov	2007, 2015–2026	(-)	22 (0)	2 (0)	24 (0)	0
7	(Azerbaijan) Rashad Sadiqov	2015-2017	(-)	22 (0)	(-)	22 (0)	0
8	(Brazil) Rafael Santos	2014-2017	(-)	20 (0)	(-)	20 (0)	0
9	(Croatia) Filip Ozobić	2016-2018	(-)	18 (3)	(-)	18 (3)	0.17
10	(Azerbaijan) Urfan Abbasov	2011-2019, 2021–2024	(-)	15 (0)	2 (0)	17 (0)	0
11	(Brazil) Dodô	2011-2016	(-)	15 (4)	(-)	15 (4)	0.27
12	(Ukraine) Oleksiy Antonov	2015-2016	(-)	14 (1)	(-)	14 (1)	0.07
12	(Ukraine) Oleksiy Hai	2015-2016	(-)	14 (0)	(-)	14 (0)	0
12	(Azerbaijan) Arif Dashdemirov	2009-2010, 2015-2016	(-)	14 (0)	(-)	14 (0)	0
15	(France) Bagaliy Dabo	2016-2018	(-)	13 (3)	(-)	13 (3)	0.23
16	(Liberia) Theo Weeks	2016-2017	(-)	12 (5)	(-)	12 (5)	0.42
16	(Azerbaijan) Elvin Camalov	2013-2019	(-)	12 (0)	(-)	12 (0)	0
18	(Georgia (country)) Nika Kvekveskiri	2016-2017	(-)	11 (1)	(-)	11 (1)	0.09
18	(Azerbaijan) Mahammad Mirzabeyov	2015-2017	(-)	11 (0)	(-)	11 (0)	0
18	(Azerbaijan) Javid Huseynov	2014-2015, 2016–2019, 2020-2021	(-)	11 (3)	(-)	11 (3)	0.27
21	(Bosnia and Herzegovina) Ermin Zec	2015-2016	(-)	9 (0)	(-)	9 (0)	0
21	(Azerbaijan) Samir Zargarov	2005-2009, 2015-2016	(-)	9 (0)	(-)	9 (0)	0
23	(Azerbaijan) Rashad Eyyubov	2016-2017	(-)	8 (0)	(-)	8 (0)	0
24	(Azerbaijan) Ruslan Gurbanov	2016-2018	(-)	6 (2)	(-)	6 (2)	0.33
24	(Azerbaijan) Ilgar Gurbanov	2017-2019	(-)	6 (1)	(-)	6 (1)	0.17
24	(France) Steeven Joseph-Monrose	2017-2019	(-)	6 (2)	(-)	6 (2)	0.33
24	(Azerbaijan) Ulvi Isgandarov	2017–2024	(-)	2 (0)	4 (0)	6 (0)	0
28	(Argentina) Facundo Pereyra	2015-2016	(-)	5 (0)	(-)	5 (0)	0
28	(Paraguay) David Meza	2015	(-)	5 (0)	(-)	5 (0)	0
30	(Croatia) Petar Franjić	2016	(-)	4 (0)	(-)	4 (0)	0
30	(Azerbaijan) Elvin Mammadov	2017-2018	(-)	4 (0)	(-)	4 (0)	0
30	(Mali) Famoussa Koné	2017-2018	(-)	4 (0)	(-)	4 (0)	0
30	(Scotland) Andy Halliday	2017-2018	(-)	4 (0)	(-)	4 (0)	0
30	(Netherlands) Dave Bulthuis	2017	(-)	4 (0)	(-)	4 (0)	0
30	(Azerbaijan) Ilkin Qirtimov	2022–2024	(-)	(-)	4 (0)	4 (0)	0
30	(Jordan) Omar Hani	2021-2024	(-)	(-)	4 (0)	4 (0)	0
37	(Romania) George Florescu	2015	(-)	3 (0)	(-)	3 (0)	0
37	(Suriname) Dion Malone	2017-2018	(-)	3 (0)	(-)	3 (0)	0
37	(Azerbaijan) Rasim Ramaldanov	2017-2021	(-)	3 (0)	(-)	3 (0)	0
37	(Azerbaijan) Qismət Alıyev	2015-2020	(-)	3 (0)	(-)	3 (0)	0
37	(Azerbaijan) Sadig Guliyev	2013-2016, 2019-2021	(-)	3 (0)	(-)	3 (0)	0
37	(Azerbaijan) Roman Huseynov	2015-2021	(-)	3 (0)	(-)	3 (0)	0
37	(Azerbaijan) Rovlan Muradov	2017-2023	(-)	1 (0)	2 (1)	3 (1)	0.33
37	(Azerbaijan) Emil Safarov	2021–2024	(-)	(-)	3 (0)	3 (0)	0
37	(Azerbaijan) Murad Musayev	2013-2016, 2019–2026	(-)	(-)	3 (0)	3 (0)	0
46	(Azerbaijan) Ruslan Amirjanov	2014-2015	(-)	2 (0)	(-)	2 (0)	0
46	(Azerbaijan) Volodimir Levin	2013-2014	(-)	2 (0)	(-)	2 (0)	0
46	(Senegal) Victor Mendy	2011-2015	(-)	2 (0)	(-)	2 (0)	0
46	(Azerbaijan) Ruslan Tagizade	2014-2015	(-)	2 (0)	(-)	2 (0)	0
46	(Romania) Adrian Ropotan	2014-2015	(-)	2 (0)	(-)	2 (0)	0
46	(Azerbaijan) Kamran Agayev	2014-2015	(-)	2 (0)	(-)	2 (0)	0
46	(Azerbaijan) Nizami Hajiyev	2013-2014	(-)	2 (0)	(-)	2 (0)	0
46	(Romania) Andrei Cristea	2014	(-)	2 (0)	(-)	2 (0)	0
46	(Azerbaijan) Tellur Mutallimov	2015-2017	(-)	2 (0)	(-)	2 (0)	0
46	(Azerbaijan) Rauf Aliyev	2018-2019	(-)	2 (0)	(-)	2 (0)	0
46	(Nigeria) James Adeniyi	2018-2021	(-)	2 (0)	(-)	2 (0)	0
46	(Togo) Lalawélé Atakora	2018-2019	(-)	2 (0)	(-)	2 (0)	0
46	(Albania) Sabien Lilaj	2018-2019	(-)	2 (0)	(-)	2 (0)	0
46	(Azerbaijan) Tamkin Khalilzade	2018	(-)	2 (0)	(-)	2 (0)	0
46	(Azerbaijan) Anar Nazirov	2010-2013, 2014–2015, 2019–2021	(-)	2 (0)	(-)	2 (0)	0
46	(Azerbaijan) Amin Seydiyev	2019-2020	(-)	2 (0)	(-)	2 (0)	0
46	(Croatia) Ivica Žunić	2019-2020	(-)	2 (0)	(-)	2 (0)	0
46	(Mozambique) Clésio	2019-2020, 2024	(-)	2 (0)	(-)	2 (0)	0
46	(Spain) Fernán López	2019-2020, 2021-2022	(-)	2 (0)	(-)	2 (0)	0
46	(Georgia (country)) Merab Gigauri	2019-2021	(-)	2 (0)	(-)	2 (0)	0
46	(Georgia (country)) Davit Volkovi	2019	(-)	2 (0)	(-)	2 (0)	0
46	(Ivory Coast) Christian Kouakou	2019	(-)	2 (0)	(-)	2 (0)	0
46	(Azerbaijan) Səlahət Ağayev	2022-2023	(-)	(-)	2 (0)	2 (0)	0
46	(Brazil) Ruan Renato	2021-2023	(-)	(-)	2 (0)	2 (0)	0
46	(Albania) Isnik Alimi	2021-2023	(-)	(-)	2 (0)	2 (0)	0
46	(Israel) Fares Abu Akel	2022-2024	(-)	(-)	2 (0)	2 (0)	0
46	(Brazil) Raphael Utzig	2020-2023	(-)	(-)	2 (1)	2 (1)	0.5
46	(Azerbaijan) Magsad Isayev	2021-2023	(-)	(-)	2 (0)	2 (0)	0
46	(Brazil) Felipe Santos	2022-2023	(-)	(-)	2 (1)	2 (1)	0.5
46	(Brazil) Lucas Áfrico	2023–2024	(-)	(-)	2 (1)	2 (1)	0.5
46	(Azerbaijan) Rauf Hüseynli	2023–2024	(-)	(-)	2 (0)	2 (0)	0
46	(Azerbaijan) Ayyoub Allach	2023–2024	(-)	(-)	2 (2)	2 (2)	1
46	(Cameroon) Christophe Atangana	2021–2024	(-)	(-)	2 (0)	2 (0)	0
46	(Togo) Yaovi Akakpo	2020–2024	(-)	(-)	2 (0)	2 (0)	0
46	(France) Bilel Aouacheria	2023–2024	(-)	(-)	2 (0)	2 (0)	0
46	(Israel) Osama Khalaila	2023–2024	(-)	(-)	2 (0)	2 (0)	0
46	(Nigeria) Ahmed Isaiah	2023–2024	(-)	(-)	2 (1)	2 (1)	0.5
46	(Israel) Gilad Abramov	2024-2024	(-)	(-)	2 (0)	2 (0)	0
84	(Azerbaijan) Elnur Allahverdiyev	2014	(-)	1 (0)	(-)	1 (0)	0
84	(Azerbaijan) Andrey Popovich	2015-2016	(-)	1 (0)	(-)	1 (0)	0
84	(Poland) Dawid Pietrzkiewicz	2013-2014, 2015-2017	(-)	1 (0)	(-)	1 (0)	0
84	(Azerbaijan) Vagif Javadov	2015	(-)	1 (0)	(-)	1 (0)	0
84	(Spain) Javi Hernández	2017	(-)	1 (0)	(-)	1 (0)	0
84	(Azerbaijan) Bəhlul Mustafazadə	2016-2019	(-)	1 (0)	(-)	1 (0)	0
84	(Azerbaijan) Yusif Nabiyev	2016-2017, 2018-2021	(-)	1 (0)	(-)	1 (0)	0
84	(Azerbaijan) Rufat Ahmadov	2019–2026	(-)	(-)	1 (0)	1 (0)	0
84	(Azerbaijan) Mehrac Bakhshali	2021–Present	(-)	(-)	1 (0)	1 (0)	0

=== Goalscorers ===
As of match played 3 August 2023

	Name	Years	UEFA Champions League	UEFA Europa League	UEFA Europa Conference League	Total	Ratio
1	(Estonia) Sergei Zenjov	2015-2017	(-)	6 (27)	(-)	6 (27)	0.22
2	(Liberia) Theo Weeks	2016-2017	(-)	5 (12)	(-)	5 (12)	0.42
3	(Brazil) Dodô	2011-2016	(-)	4 (15)	(-)	4 (15)	0.27
4	(Azerbaijan) Javid Huseynov	2014-2015, 2016–2019, 2020-2021	(-)	3 (11)	(-)	3 (11)	0.27
4	(Croatia) Filip Ozobić	2016-2018	(-)	3 (18)	(-)	3 (18)	0.17
4	(France) Bagaliy Dabo	2016-2018	(-)	3 (13)	(-)	3 (13)	0.23
7	(Azerbaijan) Ruslan Gurbanov	2016-2018	(-)	2 (6)	(-)	2 (6)	0.33
7	(France) Steeven Joseph-Monrose	2017-2019	(-)	2 (6)	(-)	2 (6)	0.33
7	(Morocco) Ayyoub Allach	2023–2024	(-)	(-)	2 (2)	2 (2)	1
10	(Ukraine) Oleksiy Antonov	2015-2016	(-)	1 (14)	(-)	1 (14)	0.07
10	(Ukraine) Vitaliy Vernydub	2015-2018	(-)	1 (26)	(-)	1 (26)	0.04
10	(Serbia) Vojislav Stanković	2016-2019	(-)	1 (29)	(-)	1 (29)	0.03
10	(Brazil) Ricardinho	2015-2017	(-)	1 (27)	(-)	1 (27)	0.04
10	(Georgia (country)) Nika Kvekveskiri	2016-2017	(-)	1 (11)	(-)	1 (11)	0.09
10	(Azerbaijan) Ilgar Gurbanov	2017-2019	(-)	1 (6)	(-)	1 (6)	0.17
10	(Brazil) Raphael Utzig	2020-2023	(-)	(-)	1 (2)	1 (2)	0.5
10	(Brazil) Felipe Santos	2022-2023	(-)	(-)	1 (2)	1 (2)	0.5
10	(Azerbaijan) Rovlan Muradov	2017-2023	(-)	(-)	1 (3)	1 (3)	0.33
10	(Nigeria) Ahmed Isaiah	2023–2024	(-)	(-)	1 (2)	1 (2)	0.5
10	Own goal	2014–Present	(-)	1 (38)	0 (4)	1 (42)	0.02

=== Clean sheets ===
As of match played 3 August 2023

	Name	Years	UEFA Champions League	UEFA Europa League	UEFA Europa Conference League	Total	Ratio
1	(Ukraine) Dmytro Bezotosnyi	2015-2019	(-)	10 (32)	(-)	10 (32)	0.31
2	(Azerbaijan) Kamran Agayev	2014-2015	(-)	0 (2)	(-)	0 (2)	0
2	(Azerbaijan) Andrey Popovich	2015-2016	(-)	0 (1)	(-)	0 (1)	0
2	(Poland) Dawid Pietrzkiewicz	2013-2014, 2015-2017	(-)	0 (1)	(-)	0 (1)	0
2	(Azerbaijan) Anar Nazirov	2010-2013, 2014–2015, 2019–2021	(-)	0 (2)	(-)	0 (2)	0
2	(Azerbaijan) Səlahət Ağayev	2022-2023, 2024-Present	(-)	(-)	0 (2)	0 (2)	0
2	(Cameroon) Christophe Atangana	2021–2024	(-)	(-)	0 (2)	0 (2)	0

== Overall record ==
=== By competition ===
As of match played 3 August 2023

Competition	Pld	W	D	L	GF	GA
UEFA Europa League	38	10	7	21	36	55
UEFA Europa Conference League	4	1	0	3	6	12
Total	42	11	7	24	42	67

=== By country ===
As of match played 3 August 2023

Country	Pld	W	D	L	GF	GA	GD	Win%
Belgium	2	0	0	2	2	6	−4	0.00
Bosnia and Herzegovina	2	0	0	2	0	5	−5	0.00
Cyprus	4	1	1	2	5	8	−3	25.00
France	4	1	1	2	3	4	−1	25.00
Georgia	6	2	0	4	9	10	−1	33.33
Germany	4	0	0	4	3	12	−9	0.00
Greece	6	0	4	2	3	5	−2	0.00
Hungary	4	3	0	1	7	6	+1	75.00
Luxembourg	2	1	0	1	1	2	−1	50.00
Poland	2	1	1	0	3	1	+2	50.00
Russia	2	0	0	2	1	5	−4	0.00
Serbia	2	1	0	1	2	1	+1	50.00
Slovenia	2	1	0	1	3	2	+1	50.00

=== By club ===
As of match played 3 August 2023

Opponent	Played	Won	Drawn	Lost	For	Against	Difference	Ratio
(Belgium) Anderlecht	2	0	0	2	2	6	−4	0.00
(Cyprus) Apollon Limassol	2	1	1	0	2	1	+1	50.00
(Germany) Borussia Dortmund	2	0	0	2	1	7	−6	0.00
(Serbia) Čukarički	2	1	0	1	2	1	+1	50.00
(Georgia (country)) Dinamo Tbilisi	4	1	0	3	3	7	−4	25.00
(France) Fehérvár	2	1	0	1	3	5	−2	50.00
(Poland) Jagiellonia Białystok	2	1	1	0	3	1	+2	50.00
(Russia) Krasnodar	2	0	0	2	1	5	−4	0.00
(France) Lille	2	1	1	0	2	1	+1	50.00
(Germany) Mainz 05	2	0	0	2	2	5	−3	0.00
(Slovenia) Maribor	2	1	0	1	3	2	+1	50.00
(Hungary) MTK Budapest	2	2	0	0	4	1	+3	100.00
(Cyprus) Omonia	2	0	0	2	3	7	−4	0.00
(Greece) Panathinaikos	4	0	2	2	3	6	−3	0.00
(Greece) PAOK	2	0	2	0	0	0	+0	0.00
(Luxembourg) Progrès Niederkorn	2	1	0	1	1	2	−1	50.00
(France) Saint-Étienne	2	0	0	2	1	3	−2	0.00
(Georgia (country)) Samtredia	2	1	0	1	6	3	+3	50.00
(Bosnia and Herzegovina) Široki Brijeg	2	0	0	2	0	5	−5	0.00
