= 2023–24 Azerbaijan Premier League =

Azerbaijan Premier League
- Season: 2023–24
- Dates: 4 August 2023 – 26 May 2024
- Champions: Qarabağ
- Relegated: Gabala
- UEFA Champions League: Qarabağ
- UEFA Europa League: Zira
- UEFA Conference League: Sabah; Sumgayit
- Matches: 145
- Goals: 376 (2.59 per match)
- Top goalscorer: Juninho (17 goals)
- Biggest home win: Qarabağ 7–1 Kapaz (4 November 2023)
- Biggest away win: Sumgayit 1–6 Qarabağ (8 December 2023)
- Highest scoring: Qarabağ 7–1 Kapaz (4 November 2023)
- Longest winning run: 10 matches Qarabağ
- Longest unbeaten run: 18 matches Qarabağ
- Longest winless run: 11 matches Kapaz; Gabala
- Longest losing run: 5 matches Gabala
- Highest attendance: 9,300; Sumgayit 1–0 Qarabağ (28 April 2024)
- Lowest attendance: 500; Sabail 1-4 Sumgayit (5 August 2023)
- Total attendance: 185,745
- Average attendance: 1,281
- All statistics correct as of 11 April 2024.

The 2023–24 Azerbaijan Premier League was the 32nd season of the Azerbaijan Premier League, the highest tier football league of Azerbaijan. The season began on 4 August 2023 and ended on 26 May 2024.

== Teams ==
=== Team changes ===
Promoted from 2022–23 Azerbaijan First Division	Relegated to 2023–24 Azerbaijan First Division
Araz-Naxçıvan	Shamakhi

Locations of the 2023–24 Azerbaijan Premier League teams

=== Stadia and locations ===
Note: Table lists in alphabetical order.

Team	Year Established	Location	Venue	Capacity
Araz-Naxçıvan	1967	Nakhchivan, Baku	Dalga Arena	6,500
Gabala	1995	Qabala	Gabala City Stadium	4,500
Kapaz	1959	Ganja, Tovuz	Tovuz City Stadium	6,500
Neftchi	1937	Baku	Neftchi Arena	10,260
Qarabağ	1951	Aghdam, Baku	Tofiq Bahramov Stadium	31,200
Sabah	2017	Absheron	Bank Respublika Arena	8,600
Sabail	2016	Sabail, Baku	ASCO Arena	3,200
Sumgayit	2010	Sumgait	Mehdi Huseynzade Stadium	8,700
Turan Tovuz	1992	Tovuz	Tovuz City Stadium	6,500
Zira	2014	Zira, Baku	Zira Sport Complex	1,300

=== Stadiums ===
Araz-Naxçıvan	Gabala	Kapaz	Qarabağ	Neftçi
Dalga Arena	Gabala City Stadium	Ganja City Stadium	Tofiq Bahramov Stadium	Neftchi Arena
Capacity: **6,500**	Capacity: **4,500**	Capacity: **26,000**	Capacity: **31,200**	Capacity: **10,260**
Sabah	Sabail	Sumgayit	Turan Tovuz	Zira
Bank Respublika Arena	ASCO Arena	Mehdi Huseynzade Stadium	Tovuz City Stadium	Zira Sport Complex
Capacity: **8,600**	Capacity: **3,200**	Capacity: **8,700**	Capacity: **6,500**	Capacity: **1,300**

=== Personnel and kits ===
Note: Flags indicate national team as has been defined under FIFA eligibility rules. Players and managers may hold more than one non-FIFA nationality.

Team	President	Manager	Captain	Kit manufacturer	Shirt sponsor
Araz-Naxçıvan	(Azerbaijan) Ramin Akhundov	(Azerbaijan) Elmar Bakhshiyev	(Bosnia and Herzegovina) Numan Kurdić	(Italy) Diadora	Samaya Ltd
Gabala	(Azerbaijan) Fariz Najafov	(Georgia (country)) Kakhaber Tskhadadze	(Azerbaijan) Asif Mammadov	(United States) Capelli Sport	Gilan & Knauf
Kapaz	(Azerbaijan) Ilgar Nadiri	(Azerbaijan) Azer Mammadov	(Azerbaijan) Vurğun Hüseynov	(Spain) Joma	-
Neftçi	(Azerbaijan) Kamran Guliyev	(Montenegro) Miodrag Božović	(Azerbaijan) Emin Mahmudov	(Italy) Erreà	SOCAR
Qarabağ	(Turkey) Tahir Gozal	(Azerbaijan) Gurban Gurbanov	(Azerbaijan) Maksim Medvedev	(Germany) Adidas	Azersun
Sabah	(Azerbaijan) Magsud Adigozalov	(Croatia) Krunoslav Rendulić	(Azerbaijan) Elvin Jamalov	(United States) Nike	Bank Respublika
Sabail	(Azerbaijan) Abdulgani Nurmammadov	(Azerbaijan) Shahin Diniyev	(Azerbaijan) Aghabala Ramazanov	(Germany) Adidas	ASCO
Sumgayit	(Azerbaijan) Riad Rafiyev	(Azerbaijan) Samir Abbasov	(Azerbaijan) Elvin Badalov	(Italy) Macron	Pasha Insurance, Azərikimya
Turan Tovuz	(Azerbaijan) Ogtay Abdullayev	(Azerbaijan) Aykhan Abbasov	(Azerbaijan) Kamal Bayramov	(Germany) Jako	Huner Group
Zira	(Azerbaijan) Taleh Nasibov	(Azerbaijan) Rashad Sadygov	(Azerbaijan) Qismət Alıyev	(Spain) Joma	Nar, Azfargroup

=== Managerial changes ===
Team	Outgoing manager	Manner of departure	Date of vacancy	Position in table	Incoming manager	Date of appointment
Araz-Naxçıvan				Pre-season	(Azerbaijan) Azer Baghirov	17 July 2023
Kapaz	(Azerbaijan) Tarlan Ahmadov			Pre-season	(Azerbaijan) Azer Mammadov	12 June 2023
Neftçi	(Romania) Laurențiu Reghecampf	Mutual Agreement	21 June 2023	Pre-season	(Romania) Adrian Mutu	11 July 2023
Neftçi	(Romania) Adrian Mutu	Mutual Agreement	24 December 2023	3rd	(Montenegro) Miodrag Božović	24 December 2023
Sabah	(Russia) Murad Musayev	Resignation	1 February 2024	7th	(Azerbaijan) Ruslan Qafitullin (Acting)	1 February 2024
Gabala	(Azerbaijan) Elmar Bakhshiyev	Resignation	24 February 2024	10th	(Georgia (country)) Kakhaber Tskhadadze	25 February 2024
Sabah	(Azerbaijan) Ruslan Qafitullin (Acting)	End of contract	5 March 2024	6th	(Croatia) Krunoslav Rendulić	5 March 2024

=== Foreign players ===
Each team could use only seven foreign players on the field in each game.

Club	Player 1	Player 2	Player 3	Player 4	Player 5	Player 6	Player 7	Player 8	Player 9	Player 10	Player 11	Player 12	Player 13	Player 14	Player 15	Left during the season
Araz-Naxçıvan	(Belgium) Ismail Azzaoui	(Bosnia and Herzegovina) Semir Bukvić	(Bosnia and Herzegovina) **Numan Kurdić**	(Bosnia and Herzegovina) Mićo Kuzmanović	(Brazil) Wanderson Maranhão	(Brazil) Igor Ribeiro	(Democratic Republic of the Congo) Elvis Mashike Sukisa	(France) Axel Ngando	(Ghana) Mohammed Kadiri	(Moldova) **Cristian Avram**	(Portugal) Nuno Rodrigues	(Ukraine) Tugay Alizada				
Gabala	(Cameroon) Christophe Atangana	(Brazil) Lucas Áfrico	(France) Bilel Aouacheria	(Ghana) **Samuel Tetteh**	(Israel) **Osama Khalaila**	(Morocco) Ayyoub Allach	(Mozambique) **Clésio**	(Nigeria) Ahmed Isaiah	(Togo) Yaovi Akakpo	(Ukraine) Zurab Ochihava						(Jordan) **Omar Hani** (Israel) **Gilad Avramov** (Israel) **Fares Abu Akel**
Kapaz	(Belarus) Yegor Khvalko	(Belarus) Vladislav Vasilyuchek	(Brazil) Martin Júnior	(Georgia (country)) Mate Kvirkvia	(Georgia (country)) **Giorgi Papunashvili**	(Nigeria) Olawale Onanuga	(Senegal) Latyr Fall	(Portugal) Igor Rodrigues	(Mali) **Adama Niane**							(Nigeria) Abdullahi Shuaibu
Neftçi	(Argentina) Lucas Melano	(Belarus) **Yegor Bogomolsky**	(Brazil) Andre Shinyashiki	(Brazil) Yuri Matias	(Colombia) Brayan Moreno	(Croatia) Ivan Brkić	(Hungary) **Márk Tamás**	(Ivory Coast) Erwin Koffi	(Palestine) **Ataa Jaber**	(Paraguay) **Mudo Valdez**	(Russia) Reziuan Mirzov	(Collectivity of Saint Martin) Keelan Lebon	(Sierra Leone) Alpha Conteh			(United States) **Kenny Saief** (Nigeria) **Aaron Samuel Olanare**
Qarabağ	(Albania) **Redon Xhixha**	(Algeria) **Yassine Benzia**	(Brazil) Juninho	(Brazil) Júlio Romão	(Brazil) Matheus Silva	(Cape Verde) **Leandro Andrade**	(Cape Verde) **Patrick Andrade**	(Colombia) Kevin Medina	(France) Adama Diakhaby	(France) Hamidou Keyta	(France) Abdellah Zoubir	(Georgia (country)) **Luka Gugeshashvili**	(Montenegro) **Marko Janković**	(Montenegro) **Marko Vešović**	(Russia) **Andrey Lunyov**	
Sabah	(Bosnia and Herzegovina) Bojan Letić	(Brazil) Christian	(Russia) Ayaz Guliyev	(Curaçao) **Jearl Margaritha**	(Georgia (country)) **Davit Volkovi**	(Nigeria) Jesse Sekidika	(Jamaica) **Kaheem Parris**	(Luxembourg) **Vincent Thill**	(Morocco) **Sofian Chakla**	(Nigeria) Emmanuel Apeh	(Spain) Cristian Ceballos	(Spain) Jon Irazabal	(Morocco) Marouane Hadhoudi	(Algeria) **Ishak Belfodil**		(Russia) Ildar Alekperov
Sabail	(Angola) **Paná**	(Bosnia and Herzegovina) Adi Mehremić	(France) Sylvain Deslandes	(Guinea-Bissau) **David Gomis**	(Guinea-Bissau) **Madi Queta**	(Israel) Nir Bardea	(Israel) Yadin Lugasi	(Kenya) **Ayub Masika**	(Madagascar) **Alexandre Ramalingom**	(Netherlands) Anass Najah	(Portugal) Pedro Nuno					(Serbia) Matija Ljujić
Sumgayit	(Brazil) Octávio	(Burundi) **Trésor Mossi**	(Cape Verde) **Steven Pereira**	(Chad) **Casimir Ninga**	(Ecuador) Jordan Rezabala	(Estonia) **Erik Sorga**	(Israel) **Roi Kahat**	(Ivory Coast) Abou Dosso	(Japan) Masaki Murata	(North Macedonia) Kristijan Velinovski	(Pakistan) **Easah Suliman**					(North Macedonia) **Todor Todoroski**
Turan Tovuz	(Albania) Belajdi Pusi	(Brazil) Alex Souza	(Brazil) Brunão	(Brazil) Pachu	(Bulgaria) Martin Petkov	(Georgia (country)) Piruz Marakvelidze	(Moldova) **Denis Marandici**	(Nigeria) Otto John	(Panama) **Roderick Miller**	(Russia) Aykhan Guseynov	(Spain) Álex Serrano	(Togo) **Emmanuel Hackman**				
Zira	(Brazil) Filipe Pachtmann	(Brazil) Ruan Renato	(Brazil) Raphael Utzig	(Greece) Dimitrios Chantakias	(Guinea) Salifou Soumah	(Ivory Coast) Stephane Acka	(Ivory Coast) Pierre Zebli	(Niger) **Issa Djibrilla**	(Nigeria) Abbas Ibrahim	(Ukraine) Vladyslav Kulach	(Ukraine) Eldar Kuliyev	(Portugal) Tiago Silva				(Guinea-Bissau) **Toni Gomes** (Serbia) Andrija Luković

In italics:' Players on loan from another APL side.
In bold: Players capped for their national team.

== League table ==
Pos	Team	Pld	W	D	L	GF	GA	GD	Pts	Qualification or relegation
1	Qarabağ (C)	36	26	5	5	97	37	+60	83	Qualification for the Champions League second qualifying round (Note: Since already qualified Real Madrid won the Champions League, Qarabağ was promoted to the Champions League second qualifying round as one of the two champions with the highest coefficient in Champions League qualifying.)
2	Zira	36	16	10	10	33	22	+11	58 (Note: Zira are ahead of Sabah on head-to-head points: Zira 1–0 Sabah, Sabah 0–1 Zira, Zira 0–1 Sabah, Sabah 0–1 Zira)	Qualification for the Europa League first qualifying round (Note: The 2023–24 Azerbaijan Cup winners qualified for the Europa League first qualifying round. Since the cup winners (Qarabağ) qualified based on league position, the Europa League spot was passed to the second-placed team, and the second Conference League second round spot was passed to the fourth-placed team.)
3	Sabah	36	17	7	12	50	40	+10	58	Qualification for the Conference League second qualifying round
4	Sumgayit	36	15	12	9	37	38	−1	57	Qualification for the Conference League second qualifying round
5	Neftçi	36	16	8	12	51	40	+11	56	
6	Turan Tovuz	36	13	9	14	53	53	0	48	
7	Sabail	36	11	9	16	50	60	−10	42	
8	Araz-Naxçıvan	36	9	9	18	31	50	−19	36	
9	Kapaz	36	9	8	19	39	67	−28	35	
10	Gabala (R)	36	7	5	24	30	64	−34	26	Relegation to Azerbaijan First Division

Source: Soccerway
Rules for classification: 1) Points; 2) Head-to-head points; 3) Head-to-head goal difference; 4) Head-to-head goals scored; 5) Head-to-head away goals scored (only if two teams); 6) Goal difference; 7) Goals scored.
(C) Champions; (R) Relegated

== Fixtures and results ==
Clubs play each other four times for a total of 36 matches each.

Home \ Away	ARA	GAB	KAP	NEF	QAR	SAB	SEB	SUM	TUR	ZIR	ARA	GAB	KAP	NEF	QAR	SAB	SEB	SUM	TUR	ZIR
Araz-Naxçıvan		2–0	0–1	1–0	2–1	2–0	1–1	1–1	0–3	1–0		1–1	1–2	1–0	2–2	0–1	0–2	1–1	0–1	0–3
Gabala	1–4		0–3	0–2	1–2	1–0	0–1	1–2	4–0	1–0	2–0		0–1	0–1	0–4	2–0	2–3	0–1	1–2	1–1
Kapaz	1–2	0–1		1–0	1–2	0–2	0–3	1–1	0–2	0–0	3–1	2–1		3–3	1–6	1–2	1–4	1–1	2–1	0–1
Neftçi	1–1	2–0	2–0		0–2	0–1	1–1	1–2	3–2	1–0	3–0	3–1	5–1		1–4	0–1	3–0	1–1	3–0	1–0
Qarabağ	2–1	3–0	1–1	2–0		2–0	3–1	5–0	3–0	0–1	3–1	2–2	7–1	5–0		3–3	4–2	2–0	4–3	3–1
Sabah	1–1	5–0	2–2	1–1	1–2		4–0	3–1	0–3	0–1	2–0	2–1	3–2	0–0	3–2		2–0	2–0	1–1	0–1
Sabail	1–0	3–0	0–0	2–4	2–1	2–2		1–4	2–1	1–2	2–2	2–3	3–3	0–3	1–2	2–0		0–1	1–1	0–0
Sumgayit	2–0	0–0	1–0	0–1	1–6	1–0	1–0		0–0	0–0	1–0	1–0	1–3	2–1	1–0	1–2	2–1		0–0	0–0
Turan Tovuz	3–1	2–2	4–0	0–1	2–2	2–3	1–3	2–2		1–0	2–0	2–1	1–0	1–1	1–3	2–0	3–1	1–4		1–2
Zira	0–0	1–0	1–0	1–1	0–1	1–0	2–2	1–0	2–1		0–1	4–0	2–1	3–1	0–1	0–1	1–0	0–0	1–1	

Source: soccerway.com
Legend: Blue = home team win; Yellow = draw; Red = away team win.

== Season statistics ==
As of match played 26 May 2024

=== Top scorers ===
Rank	Player	Club	Goals
1	(Brazil) Juninho	Qarabağ	20
2	(Madagascar) Alexandre Ramalingom	Sabail	15
3	(Algeria) Yassine Benzia	Qarabağ	12
3	(Azerbaijan) Nariman Akhundzade	Qarabağ	12
5	(Cape Verde) Leandro Andrade	Qarabağ	11
6	(Azerbaijan) Toral Bayramov	Qarabağ	10
6	(Portugal) Pedro Nuno	Sabail	10
8	(Azerbaijan) Orkhan Aliyev	Araz-Naxçıvan	9
8	(Nigeria) Otto John	Turan Tovuz	9
8	(Israel) Osama Khalaila	Gabala	9

=== Hat-tricks ===
Player	For	Against	Result	Date	Ref
(Algeria) Yassine Benzia	Qarabağ	Kapaz	7–1 (H)	4 November 2023	
(Georgia (country)) Davit Volkov	Sabah	Turan Tovuz	2–3 (A)	11 November 2023	
(France) Bilel Aouacheria	Gabala	Turan Tovuz	4–0 (H)	25 November 2023	
(Azerbaijan) Filip Ozobić	Neftçi	Kapaz	3–3 (A)	9 March 2024	
(Brazil) Andre Shinyashiki	Neftçi	Kapaz	5–1 (H)	10 May 2024	

=== Own goals ===
- (Azerbaijan) Sertan Taşqın – Turan Tovuz vs Qarabağ 13 August 2023
- (Spain) Jon Irazabal – Sabah vs Neftçi 20 August 2023
- (Algeria) Ishak Belfodil – Sabah vs Araz-Naxçıvan 7 October 2023
- (Bosnia and Herzegovina) Numan Kurdić – Araz-Naxçıvan vs Sabail 2 December 2023
- (Azerbaijan) Ilkin Qirtimov – Sabail vs Gabala 15 December 2023
- (Bosnia and Herzegovina) Bojan Letić – Araz-Naxçıvan vs Sabah 15 December 2023
- (Bosnia and Herzegovina) Adi Mehremić – Sumgayit vs Sabail 23 December 2023
- (Bosnia and Herzegovina) Numan Kurdić – Qarabağ vs Araz-Naxçıvan 23 January 2024
- (Brazil) Wanderson – Araz-Naxçıvan vs Zira 25 February 2024
- (Israel) Nir Bardea – Neftçi vs Sabail 15 March 2024
- (Azerbaijan) Murad Khachayev – Sumgayit vs Sabah 17 March 2024
- (Brazil) Yuri Matias – Neftçi vs Sumgayit 7 April 2024
- (Brazil) Igor Ribeiro - Neftçi vs Araz-Naxçıvan (13 April 2024)
- (Azerbaijan) Slavik Alkhasov - Turan Tovuz vs Sumgayit (19 April 2024)
- (Azerbaijan) Murad Khachayev - Sabah vs Sumgayit (18 May 2024)

=== Clean sheets ===
As of match played 25 May 2024

Rank	Player	Club	Clean sheets
1	(Portugal) Tiago Silva	Zira	17
2	(Azerbaijan) Mekhti Dzhenetov	Sumgayit	13
3	(Azerbaijan) Rza Jafarov	Neftçi	9
3	(Azerbaijan) Aydın Bayramov	Turan Tovuz	9
5	(Azerbaijan) Yusif Imanov	Sabah	8
6	(Moldova) Cristian Avram	Araz-Naxçıvan	7
7	(Azerbaijan) Səlahət Ağayev	Sabail	6
7	(Russia) Andrey Lunyov	Qarabağ	6
7	(Azerbaijan) Rashad Azizli	Gabala	6
7	(Croatia) Ivan Brkić	Neftçi	6

Rza Jafarov & Ivan Brkić both played in Neftçi's 2-0 victory over Gabala on 27 August 2023
Nijat Mehbaliyev & Yusif Imanov both played in Sabah's 4-0 victory over Sabail on 10 December 2023

=== Discipline ===
==== Red cards ====
As of match played 25 May 2024

- (Azerbaijan) Ulvi Isgandarov - Araz-Naxçıvan vs Gabala (12 August 2023)
- (Azerbaijan) Amin Seydiyev - Zira vs Sabah (26 August 2023)
- (Azerbaijan) Rza Jafarov - Neftçi vs Gabala (27 August 2023)
- (Ivory Coast) Pierre Zebli - Zira vs Sumgayit (15 September 2023)
- (Ghana) Mohammed Kadiri - Araz-Naxçıvan vs Neftçi (16 September 2023)
- (Colombia) Kevin Medina - Gabala vs Qarabağ (25 September 2023)
- (Bosnia and Herzegovina) Bojan Letić - Sabail vs Sabah (30 September 2023)
- (Brazil) Igor Ribeiro - Araz-Naxçıvan vs Zira (1 October 2023)
- (Azerbaijan) Ilkin Qirtimov - Gabala vs Araz-Naxçıvan (22 October 2023)
- (Israel) Osama Khalaila - Gabala vs Araz-Naxçıvan (22 October 2023)
- (Brazil) Yuri Matias - Neftçi vs Sabah (30 October 2023)
- (Nigeria) Emmanuel Apeh - Sabah vs Zira (5 November 2023)
- (Azerbaijan) Emil Safarov - Gabala vs Kapaz (9 December 2023)
- (Ghana) Samuel Tetteh - Sabail vs Gabala (15 December 2023)
- (Azerbaijan) Faig Hajiyev - Kapaz vs Turan Tovuz (22 January 2024)
- (Azerbaijan) Elvin Camalov - Zira vs Sabah (27 January 2024)
- (Ukraine) Zurab Ochihava - Neftçi vs Gabala (28 January 2024)
- (Morocco) Ayyoub Allach - Neftçi vs Gabala (28 January 2024)
- (Azerbaijan) Maksim Medvedev - Sabah vs Qarabağ (3 February 2024)
- (Israel) Fares Abu Akel - Sabah vs Qarabağ (28 February 2024)
- (Niger) Issa Djibrilla - Zira vs Turan Tovuz (2 March 2024)
- (Brazil) Lucas Áfrico - Gabala vs Sabail (3 March 2024)
- (Azerbaijan) Vusal Shabanov - Turan Tovuz vs Araz-Naxçıvan (10 March 2024)
- (Bosnia and Herzegovina) Numan Kurdić - Araz-Naxçıvan vs Gabala (16 March 2024)
- (Bosnia and Herzegovina) Adi Mehremić - Sabail vs Kapaz (14 April 2024)
- (Azerbaijan) Ceyhun Nuriyev - Zira vs Neftçi (20 April 2024)
- (Brazil) Brunão - Neftçi vs Turan Tovuz (28 April 2024)
- (Nigeria) Olawale Onanuga - Kapaz vs Sumgayit (4 May 2024)
- (Brazil) Martin Júnior - Kapaz vs Sumgayit (4 May 2024)
- (Azerbaijan) Vugar Mustafayev - Kapaz vs Sumgayit (4 May 2024)
- (Brazil) Yuri Matias - Qarabağ vs Neftçi (4 May 2024)
- (Panama) Roderick Miller - Turan Tovuz vs Zira (5 May 2024)
- (Azerbaijan) Shakir Seyidov - Neftçi vs Kapaz (10 May 2024)
- (Georgia (country)) Davit Volkovi - Gabala vs Sabah (12 May 2024)
- (Paraguay) Mudo Valdez - Neftçi vs Sabah (25 May 2024)
- (Spain) Jon Irazabal - Neftçi vs Sabah (25 May 2024)
- (Jamaica) Kaheem Parris - Neftçi vs Sabah (25 May 2024)
- (Azerbaijan) Abdulakh Khaybulayev - Neftçi vs Sabah (25 May 2024)
- (Angola) Paná - Zira vs Sabail (25 May 2024)

== Attendances ==
Pos	Team	Total	High	Low	Average	Change
1	Turan Tovuz	73,900	6,000	1,500	4,106	n/a
2	Sumgayit	51,516	9,300	800	2,862	n/a
3	Neftçi	31,321	6,900	400	1,740	n/a
4	Sabah	26,997	4,300	1,100	1,500	n/a
5	Qarabağ	22,628	4,500	300	1,257	n/a
6	Zira	20,200	1,200	450	1,122	n/a
7	Kapaz	14,615	3,000	500	812	n/a
8	Sabail	14,190	2,400	200	788	n/a
9	Gabala	10,730	1,500	250	596	n/a
10	Araz-Naxçıvan	10,390	1,000	120	577	n/a
	League total	276,487	9,300	120	1,536	n/a

Updated to games played on 26 May 2024.

== See also ==
- Azerbaijan Premier League
- Azerbaijan First Division
- Azerbaijan Cup
