= 2023–24 Gabala FK season =

Gabala
2023–24 season
- President: Fariz Najafov
- Manager: Elmar Bakhshiyev (until 24 February); Kakhaber Tskhadadze (from 25 February)
- Stadium: City Stadium
- Premier League: 10th
- Azerbaijan Cup: Semi-final
- UEFA Europa Conference League: Second qualifying round
- Top goalscorer: League: Osama Khalaila (9); All: Osama Khalaila (10)

The 2023–24 season was Gabala FK's 19th season, and their 18th in the Azerbaijan Premier League, the top-flight of Azerbaijani football.

== Season overview ==
On 23 June, Gabala announced the signing of Ahmed Isaiah from Kapaz to a one-year contract. The following day, 24 June, Gabala announced the signing of Zurab Ochihava from Sabah to a two-year contract.

On 2 July, Gabala announced the signing of Lucas Áfrico from Estoril to a one-year contract with the option of a second.

On 4 July, Gabala announced the signings of Gilad Avramov from Hapoel Hadera to a two-year contract and with Osama Khalaila from Maccabi Tel Aviv on a one-year contract with the option of another.

On 9 July, Gabala announced the signing of Rauf Hüseynli from Shamakhi to a one-year contract.

On 14 July, Gabala announced the signing of Bilel Aouacheria from Gil Vicente to a two-year contract.

On 25 July, Gabala announced the signing of Rashad Azizli from Shamakhi to a one-year contract.

On 5 September, Gabala announced the singing of Samuel Tetteh to a two-year contract from Adanaspor.

On 9 January 2024, Gabala announced that Omar Hani had left the club by mutual consent. Later the same day, Clésio returned to Gabala, having previously played for the club during the 2019–20 season, on a 2.5-year contract.

On 24 February, following a 2–1 defeat to Kapaz the previous day that left Gabala eight points a drift at the bottom of the league, Elmar Bakhshiyev resigned as head coach of the club. The following day, 25 February, Gabala announced Kakhaber Tskhadadze as their new head coach on a contract until the summer of 2025.

On 8 March, Gilad Avramov left Gabala by mutual consent.

On 19 April, Fares Abu Akel left Gabala by mutual consent.

On 27 May, Gabala announced that Lucas Áfrico, Ahmed Isaiah, Ayyoub Allach, Clésio, Yaovi Akakpo and Osama Khalaila had all left the club with their contracts expiring.

== Squad ==
As of match played 25 May 2024

No.	Name	Nationality	Position	Date of birth (age)	Signed from	Signed in	Contract ends	Apps.	Goals
Goalkeepers
1	Rashad Azizli	(Azerbaijan)	GK	1 January 1994 (aged 30)	Shamakhi	2023	2024	22	0
13	Christophe Atangana	(Cameroon)	GK	2 March 2000 (aged 24)	Bilbao Athletic	2021	2023	36	0
36	Elməddin Sultanov	(Azerbaijan)	GK	7 May 2001 (aged 23)	Academy	2021		0	0
94	Habib Hushanov	(Azerbaijan)	GK		Academy	2023		0	0
Defenders
2	Ilkin Qirtimov	(Azerbaijan)	DF	4 November 1990 (aged 33)	Shamakhi	2022	2025	68	0
3	Zurab Ochihava	(Ukraine)	DF	18 May 1995 (aged 29)	Sabah	2023	2025	24	0
4	Lucas Áfrico	(Brazil)	DF	5 February 1995 (aged 29)	Estoril	2023	2024 (+1)	35	1
5	Rauf Hüseynli	(Azerbaijan)	DF	25 January 2000 (aged 24)	Shamakhi	2023	2024	35	1
12	Nicat Aliyev	(Azerbaijan)	DF	24 September 2001 (aged 22)	Sumgayit	2022		22	0
24	Khayal Khudaverdiyev	(Azerbaijan)	DF	22 January 2003 (aged 21)	Academy	2023		0	0
25	İbrahim Ramazanov	(Azerbaijan)	DF	10 October 2004 (aged 19)	Academy	2023		4	0
28	Murad Musayev	(Azerbaijan)	DF	13 June 1994 (aged 29)	Zira	2019		139	4
33	Huseyn Mursalov	(Azerbaijan)	DF	12 July 2002 (aged 21)	Academy	2021		7	0
34	Urfan Abbasov	(Azerbaijan)	DF	14 October 1992 (aged 31)	Sabail	2021		305	6
Midfielders
9	Ayyoub Allach	(Morocco)	MF	28 January 1998 (aged 26)	Virton	2023	2024	56	10
11	Asif Mammadov	(Azerbaijan)	MF	5 August 1986 (aged 37)	Inter Baku	2015		252	17
17	Yaovi Akakpo	(Togo)	MF	11 March 1999 (aged 25)		2019		30	3
20	Bilel Aouacheria	(France)	MF	2 April 1994 (aged 30)	Gil Vicente	2023	2025	42	6
27	Eşqin Ahmadov	(Azerbaijan)	MF	6 November 2005 (aged 18)	Academy	2023		5	0
30	Shahin Shahniyarov	(Azerbaijan)	MF	1 January 2005 (aged 19)	Academy	2023		9	0
77	Okan Tahmazli	(Azerbaijan)	MF	3 February 2005 (aged 19)	Academy	2023		2	0
97	Emil Süleymanov	(Azerbaijan)	MF	15 March 2004 (aged 20)	Academy	2023		1	0
99	Ahmed Isaiah	(Nigeria)	MF	10 October 1995 (aged 28)	Sabah	2023	2024	26	1
Forwards
7	Emil Safarov	(Azerbaijan)	FW	30 October 2002 (aged 21)	Academy	2021		93	5
10	Clésio	(Mozambique)	FW	11 October 1994 (aged 29)	Honka	2024	2026	35	4
14	Ulvi Isgandarov	(Azerbaijan)	FW	17 April 1998 (aged 26)	Academy	2017		140	21
18	Mehrac Bakhshali	(Azerbaijan)	FW	11 June 2003 (aged 20)	Academy	2022		19	1
19	Samuel Tetteh	(Ghana)	FW	28 July 1996 (aged 27)	Adanaspor	2023	2025	25	3
71	Senan Ağalarov	(Azerbaijan)	FW	12 May 2005 (aged 19)	Academy	2023		1	0
72	Osama Khalaila	(Israel)	FW	6 April 1998 (aged 26)	Maccabi Tel Aviv	2023	2024 (+1)	40	10
Out on loan
12	Rufat Ahmadov	(Azerbaijan)	DF	22 September 2002 (aged 21)	Academy	2020		30	0
Left during the season
6	Fares Abu Akel	(Israel)	MF	8 February 1997 (aged 27)	Ashdod	2022	2024	47	3
8	Gilad Avramov	(Israel)	MF	30 March 2000 (aged 24)	Hapoel Hadera	2023	2025	23	0
10	Omar Hani	(Jordan)	MF	27 June 1999 (aged 24)	APOEL	2021	2022 (+1)	85	4

=== Out on loan ===
Note: Flags indicate national team as defined under FIFA eligibility rules; some limited exceptions apply. Players may hold more than one non-FIFA nationality.

No.	Pos.	Nation	Player
—	DF	AZE	Rufat Ahmadov (at Kapaz)

== Transfers ==
=== In ===
Date	Position	Nationality	Name	From	Fee	Ref.
23 June 2023	MF	(Nigeria)	Ahmed Isaiah	Kapaz	Undisclosed	
24 June 2023	DF	(Ukraine)	Zurab Ochihava	Sabah	Undisclosed	
2 July 2023	DF	(Brazil)	Lucas Áfrico	Estoril	Undisclosed	
4 July 2023	MF	(Israel)	Gilad Avramov	Hapoel Hadera	Undisclosed	
4 July 2023	FW	(Israel)	Osama Khalaila	Maccabi Tel Aviv	Undisclosed	
9 July 2023	DF	(Azerbaijan)	Rauf Hüseynli	Shamakhi	Undisclosed	
14 July 2023	MF	(France)	Bilel Aouacheria	Gil Vicente	Undisclosed	
25 July 2023	GK	(Azerbaijan)	Rashad Azizli	Shamakhi	Undisclosed	
5 September 2023	FW	(Ghana)	Samuel Tetteh	Adanaspor	Undisclosed	
9 January 2024	FW	(Mozambique)	Clésio	Honka	Undisclosed	

=== Loans out ===
Date from	Position	Nationality	Name	To	Date to	Ref.
5 July 2023	DF	(Azerbaijan)	Rufat Ahmadov	Kapaz	End of season	

=== Released ===
Date	Position	Nationality	Name	Joined	Date	Ref
3 July 2023	FW	(Brazil)	Raphael Utzig	Chungnam Asan	7 July 2023	
22 July 2023	MF	(Azerbaijan)	Rauf Rustamli	Sabah		
9 January 2024	MF	(Jordan)	Omar Hani	Doxa Katokopias	19 January 2024	
8 March 2024	MF	(Israel)	Gilad Avramov	Ironi Tiberias		
19 April 2024	MF	(Israel)	Fares Abu Akel	Ironi Tiberias		
27 May 2024	DF	(Brazil)	Lucas Áfrico	Farense	28 June 2024	
27 May 2024	MF	(Morocco)	Ayyoub Allach	Sheriff Tiraspol	4 July 2024	
27 May 2024	MF	(Nigeria)	Ahmed Isaiah	Al-Quwa Al-Jawiya		
27 May 2024	MF	(Togo)	Yaovi Akakpo	CA Neuville	24 January 2025	
27 May 2024	FW	(Israel)	Osama Khalaila	LNZ Cherkasy	30 August 2024	
27 May 2024	FW	(Mozambique)	Clésio	Al-Arabi		
15 June 2024	MF	(France)	Bilel Aouacheria	Al-Najma	20 September 2024	
30 June 2024	GK	(Azerbaijan)	Rashad Azizli	Sumgayit	27 September 2024	
30 June 2024	DF	(Azerbaijan)	Urfan Abbasov	Araz-Naxçıvan	1 July 2024	
30 June 2024	FW	(Azerbaijan)	Ulvi Isgandarov	Araz-Naxçıvan	1 July 2024	

== Friendlies ==
3 July 2023	Gabala	2–2	Sabah	Qabala
18:00 AZT (UTC+4)	Isaiah 19'; Musayev 68'	Report	Volkovi 9'; Chakla 12'	Stadium: Gabala City Stadium

12 July 2023	Gabala	4–2	Sucleia	Bolu, Turkey
17:00 AZT (UTC+4)	Qirtimov; Musayev; Hani; Khalaila	Report	Goal	Stadium: Thermal Hotel Training Ground

15 July 2023	Gabala	1–1	Orenburg	Bolu, Turkey
AZT (UTC+4)	Isgandarov 50'	Report	Vorobyov 90+1'	Stadium: Sarkan Ajar Topuk Plateau

19 July 2023	Gabala	3–1	Gostivari	Bolu, Turkey
AZT (UTC+4)	Allach 44'; Khalaila 45+1', 49'	Report	Goal

10 September 2023	Gabala	0–0	Araz-Naxçıvan	Qabala
AZT (UTC+4)		Report		Stadium: Gabala City Stadium

10 January 2024	Gabala	1–2	Kapaz	Qabala
14:00 AZT (UTC+4)	Isgandarov 13'	Report	Papunashvili 25'; Musayev 32'	Stadium: Gabala City Stadium

15 January 2024	Gabala	2–0	Araz-Naxçıvan	Qabala
AZT (UTC+4)	Allach 14'; Tetteh 57'	Report		Stadium: Gabala City Stadium

== Competitions ==
=== Overview ===
Competition	First match	Last match	Starting round	Final position	Record							
Competition	First match	Last match	Starting round	Final position	Pld	W	D	L	GF	GA	GD	Win %
Premier League	6 August 2023	25 May 2024	Matchday 1	10th	36	7	5	24	30	64	−34	19.44
Azerbaijan Cup	19 December 2023	24 April 2024	Last 16	Semifinal	5	2	1	2	5	5	+0	40.00
UEFA Europa Conference League	27 July 2023	3 August 2023	Second qualifying round	Second qualifying round	2	0	0	2	3	7	−4	0.00
Total					43	9	6	28	38	76	−38	20.93

Last updated: 25 May 2024
Source: Competitions

=== Premier League ===
Pos	Team	Pld	W	D	L	GF	GA	GD	Pts	Qualification or relegation
6	Turan Tovuz	36	13	9	14	53	53	0	48	
7	Sabail	36	11	9	16	50	60	−10	42	
8	Araz-Naxçıvan	36	9	9	18	31	50	−19	36	
9	Kapaz	36	9	8	19	39	67	−28	35	
10	Gabala (R)	36	7	5	24	30	64	−34	26	Relegation to Azerbaijan First Division

Source: Soccerway
Rules for classification: 1) Points; 2) Head-to-head points; 3) Head-to-head goal difference; 4) Head-to-head goals scored; 5) Head-to-head away goals scored (only if two teams); 6) Goal difference; 7) Goals scored.
(R) Relegated

==== Results summary ====
Overall								Home						Away					
Pld	W	D	L	GF	GA	GD	Pts	W	D	L	GF	GA	GD	W	D	L	GF	GA	GD
36	7	5	24	30	63	−33	26	5	1	12	17	27	−10	2	4	12	13	36	−23

Last updated: 25 May 2024.
Source: See Results

==== Results by round ====
Round	1	2	3	4	5	6	7	8	9	10	11	12	13	14	15	16	17	18	19	20	21	22	23	24	25	26	27	28	29	30	31	32	33	34	35	36
Ground	A	A	H	A	H	A	H	A	H	H	A	H	A	H	A	H	A	H	H	A	H	A	A	H	H	A	A	H	A	H	A	H	A	H	H	A
Result	L	L	L	L	W	D	L	W	L	L	D	L	L	W	L	L	L	W	L	L	D	L	L	L	L	L	D	L	L	L	D	L	W	W	W	L
Position	10	10	10	10	10	10	10	8	9	9	9	9	10	9	9	10	10	10	10	10	10	10	10	10	10	10	10	10	10	10	10	10	10	10	10	10

Updated to match(es) played on 25 May 2024. Source: See Results
A = Away; H = Home; W = Win; D = Draw; L = Loss

==== Results ====
6 August 2023 1	Sabah	5–0	Gabala	Masazır
20:00 AZT (UTC+4)	Apeh 20'; Nuriyev 36'; Isayev 44'; Mickels 56'; Mutallimov 79'	Report	Abbasov (yellow card) 38'	Stadium: Bank Respublika Arena; Referee: Javid Jalilov

12 August 2023 2	Araz-Naxçıvan	2–0	Gabala	Baku
18:30 AZT (UTC+4)	Azzaoui 17'; Abdullayev (yellow card) 80'; Mashike 83' (yellow card) 84'	Report	Hani (yellow card) 24'; Isgandarov (red card) 90+4'	Stadium: Dalga Arena; Referee: Farid Haciyev

19 August 2023 3	Gabala	1–2	Sumgayit	Qabala
18:00 AZT (UTC+4)	Khalaila 53'; Bakhshali (yellow card) 90'	Report	Suliman 3'; Aliyev 31'; Octávio (yellow card) 90+2'	Stadium: City Stadium; Referee: Kamranbay Rahimov

27 August 2023 4	Neftçi	2–0	Gabala	Baku
18:30 AZT (UTC+4)	Hajiyev 45+3'; Jafarov (red card) 70'; Matias 80'	Report	Áfrico (yellow card) 8'	Stadium: Neftçi Arena; Referee: Raad Ahmadov

2 September 2023 5	Gabala	1–0	Zira	Qabala
18:00 AZT (UTC+4)	Hüseynli 20'; Qirtimov (yellow card) 45'; Aouacheria (yellow card) 45'; Allach (yellow card) 45+2'; Abbasov (yellow card) 75'; Mammadov (yellow card) 90+6'; Isaiah (yellow card) 90+9'	Report	Chantakias (yellow card) 45'; Kuliyev (yellow card) 45'; Alıyev (yellow card) 51'; Djibrilla (yellow card) 90'	Stadium: City Stadium; Referee: Javid Jalilov

17 September 2023 6	Turan Tovuz	2–2	Gabala	Tovuz
16:30 AZT (UTC+4)	Rzayev (yellow card) 45+2'; Nabiyev 56'; Pusi 59' (yellow card) 73'; Aliyev (yellow card) 62'	Report	Hüseynli (yellow card) 37'; Isgandarov (yellow card) 62'; Khalaila 71', 78' (pen.) (yellow card) 73'	Stadium: City Stadium; Referee: Aliyar Aghayev

25 September 2023 7	Gabala	1–2	Qarabağ	Qabala
19:00 AZT (UTC+4)	Qirtimov (yellow card) 31'; Allach (yellow card) 42'; Hani (yellow card) 49'; Azizli (yellow card) 52'; Ochihava (yellow card) 52'; Áfrico 76'	Report	Keyta 2'; Akhundzade 11'; Medina (red card) 42'; Bayramov (yellow card) 60'	Stadium: City Stadium; Referee: Elcin Masiyev

1 October 2023 8	Kapaz	0–1	Gabala	Ganja
16:00 AZT (UTC+4)	Shahverdiyev (yellow card) 16'; Taghiyev (yellow card) 45'; Khvalko (yellow card) 90'	Report	Hüseynli (yellow card) 38'; Safarov (yellow card) 41'; Aouacheria 52'; Isaiah (yellow card) 74'; Allach (yellow card) 75'; Ochihava (yellow card) 81'	Stadium: City Stadium; Referee: Rauf Jabarov

7 October 2023 9	Gabala	1–0	Sabail	Qabala
16:00 AZT (UTC+4)	Safarov (yellow card) 70'; Isaiah (yellow card) 80'	Report	Ahmadov (yellow card) 31'; Abdullazade 90+5'	Stadium: City Stadium; Referee: Ravan Hamzazada

22 October 2023 10	Gabala	1–4	Araz-Naxçıvan	Qabala
16:30 AZT (UTC+4)	Qirtimov (red card) 29'; Khalaila (red card) 29'; Tetteh 37'	Report	Abdullayev (yellow card) 19'; Manafov 32'; Kadiri 45'; Mashike 69'; Kuzmanović 72'	Stadium: City Stadium; Referee: Tural Qurbanov

29 October 2023 11	Sumgayit	0–0	Gabala	Sumgait
16:00 AZT (UTC+4)	Mustafayev (yellow card) 62'; Muradov (yellow card) 83'	Report	Ochihava (yellow card) 39'; Abramov (yellow card) 45'	Stadium: Kapital Bank Arena; Referee: Javid Jalilov

5 November 2023 12	Gabala	0–2	Neftçi	Qabala
16:00 AZT (UTC+4)	Hüseynli (yellow card) 23'; Abramov (yellow card) 52'; Áfrico (yellow card) 56'; Allach (yellow card) 69'	Report	Haghverdi (yellow card) 12'; Mirzov (yellow card) 16'; Tamás (yellow card) 36'; Valdez 60'; Brkić (yellow card) 90+2'; Hajiyev 90+4'	Stadium: City Stadium; Referee: Kamal Umudlu

12 November 2023 13	Zira	1–0	Gabala	Zirə
16:30 AZT (UTC+4)	Alıyev 65' (pen.)	Report	Akakpo (yellow card) 57'; Mammadov (yellow card) 87'; Ochihava (yellow card) 90'	Stadium: Zira Olympic Sport Complex Stadium; Referee: Elcin Məsiyev

25 November 2023 14	Gabala	4–0	Turan Tovuz	Qabala
16:00 AZT (UTC+4)	Aouacheria 42', 49', 85'; Tetteh 53' (yellow card) 77'; Abbasov (yellow card) 55'; Azizli (yellow card) 89'	Report	Marandici (yellow card) 72'	Stadium: City Stadium; Referee: Ravan Hamzazada

4 December 2023 15	Qarabağ	3–0	Gabala	Baku
19:30 AZT (UTC+4)	Keyta 8'; Romão (yellow card) 61'; Akhundzade 64'; Juninho 90+2'	Report	Hani (yellow card) 58'	Stadium: Tofiq Bahramov Republican Stadium; Referee: Tural Qurbanov

9 December 2023 16	Gabala	0–3	Kapaz	Qabala
15:00 AZT (UTC+4)	Áfrico (yellow card) 21'; Safarov (yellow card) 45+2' (yellow-red card) 49'; Aouacheria (yellow card) 90+1'	Report	Papunashvili 6', 72'; Kvirkvia (yellow card) 65'; Niane 70'; Masimov (yellow card) 71'	Stadium: City Stadium; Referee: Ingilab Mammadov

15 December 2023 17	Sabail	3–0	Gabala	Baku
17:00 AZT (UTC+4)	Nuno (yellow card) 8'; Lugasi 18'; Haziyev (yellow card) 45+2'; Naghiyev (yellow card) 50'; Qirtimov 52' (o.g.); Ramalingom 60' (pen.)	Report	Qirtimov (yellow card) 6'; Tetteh (red card) 35'; Mammadov (yellow card) 87'	Stadium: Bayil Arena; Referee: Rauf Cabarov

22 December 2023 18	Gabala	1–0	Sabah	Qabala
16:00 AZT (UTC+4)	Musayev 45+2'; Abramov (yellow card) 46'; Hüseynli (yellow card) 90+4'; Atangana (yellow card) 90+5'	Report	Irazabal (yellow card) 36'; Nuriyev (penalty missed) 78'; Seydiyev (yellow card) 86'	Stadium: City Stadium; Referee: Aliyar Aghayev

23 January 2024 19	Gabala	0–1	Sumgayit	Qabala
16:30 AZT (UTC+4)	Musayev (yellow card) 20'; Aouacheria (yellow card) 55'; Áfrico (yellow card) 72'	Report	Dosso (yellow card) 13'; Abdullazade (yellow card) 60'; Ninga 74' (pen.); Badalov (yellow card) 80'; Dzhenetov (yellow card) 90+7'	Stadium: City Stadium; Referee: Kamal Umudlu

28 January 2024 20	Neftçi	3–1	Gabala	Baku
17:30 AZT (UTC+4)	Salahlı (yellow card) 42'; Mahmudov 61' (pen.); Valdez 67'; Eddy (yellow card) 90+3'; Moreno 90+5' (yellow card) 90+6'	Report	Avramov (yellow card) 50'; Hüseynli (yellow card) 54'; Ochihava (yellow card) 55' (red card) 59'; Abbasov (yellow card) 60'; Safarov 87'; Allach (red card) 90+7'; Mammadov (yellow card) 90+7'	Stadium: Neftçi Arena; Referee: Ingilab Mammadov

4 February 2024 21	Gabala	1–1	Zira	Qabala
17:30 AZT (UTC+4)	Isgandarov 14'; Safarov (yellow card) 89'; Khalaila (yellow card) 90+4'; Akel (yellow card) 90+4'	Report	Muradov 19'; Ruan (yellow card) 77'; Silva (yellow card) 90+4'; Zebli (yellow card) 90+4'	Stadium: City Stadium; Referee: Raad Ahmadov

13 February 2024 22	Turan Tovuz	2–1	Gabala	Tovuz
15:00 AZT (UTC+4)	Souza 43'; Brunão (yellow card) 47'; Guseynov 53'; Serrano (yellow card) 85'; Bayramov (yellow card) 90+5'	Report	Hüseynli (yellow card) 50'; Aouacheria 77'; Akakpo (yellow card) 82'; Abramov (yellow card) 84'	Stadium: City Stadium; Referee: Rauf Allahverdiyev

23 February 2024 24	Kapaz	2–1	Gabala	Ganja
17:00 AZT (UTC+4)	Papunashvili 19' (yellow card) 24'; Yunanov 66' (pen.); Masimov (yellow card) 84'	Report	Ochihava (yellow card) 18'; Akel (yellow card) 21'; Khalaila 44'; Musayev (yellow card) 78'; Safarov (yellow card) 90+2'	Stadium: City Stadium; Referee: Ravan Hamzazada

28 February 2024 23	Gabala	0–4	Qarabağ	Qabala
19:00 AZT (UTC+4)	Akel (red card) 53'	Report	Romão (yellow card) 33'; Diakhaby 48'; Richard 59' (pen.); Akhundzade 65'; Medvedev (yellow card) 78'; Janković 81'	Stadium: City Stadium; Referee: Tural Qurbanov

3 March 2024 25	Gabala	2–3	Sabail	Qabala
16:00 AZT (UTC+4)	Abbasov 14'; Khalaila 27'; Áfrico (red card) 40'; Musayev (yellow card) 87'	Report	Nabiyev 59'; Abdullazade 65'; Masika (yellow card) 72'; Bardea 90+1'	Stadium: City Stadium; Referee: Rauf Jabarov

9 March 2024 26	Sabah	2–1	Gabala	Masazır
17:30 AZT (UTC+4)	Volkovi 20', 41'; Irazabal (yellow card) 45'; Christian (yellow card) 67'; Apeh (yellow card) 90+4'	Report	Ochihava (yellow card) 25'; Allach 45+3'	Stadium: Bank Respublika Arena; Referee: Ingilab Mammadov

16 March 2024 27	Araz-Naxçıvan	1–1	Gabala	Baku
18:30 AZT (UTC+4)	Abdullayev (yellow card) 16'; Kurdić 43' (red card) 59'; Wanderson (yellow card) 90+6'	Report	Aouacheria (yellow card) 45+3'; Qirtimov (yellow card) 52'; Khalaila 67'; Sultanov (yellow card) 74'	Stadium: Dalga Arena; Referee: Elcin Masiyev

29 March 2024 28	Gabala	0–1	Neftçi	Qabala
15:30 AZT (UTC+4)	Isaiah (yellow card) 86'	Report	Shinyashiki (yellow card) 17'; Lebon 42'; Valdez (yellow card) 43'; Jaber (yellow card) 86'	Stadium: City Stadium; Referee: Javid Jalilov

7 April 2024 29	Zira	4–0	Gabala	Zirə
16:30 AZT (UTC+4)	Sadykhov 4'; Utzig 25'; Nuriyev 28'; Zebli (yellow card) 37'; Bayramov 57'; Acka (yellow card) 60'	Report	Musayev (yellow card) 29'; Ochihava (yellow card) 51'; Safarov (yellow card) 79'	Stadium: Zira Olympic Sport Complex Stadium; Referee: Ravan Hamzazada

13 April 2024 30	Gabala	1–2	Turan Tovuz	Qabala
16:30 AZT (UTC+4)	Atangana (yellow card) 5'; Allach 49'; Aouacheria (yellow card) 71'; Hüseynli (yellow card) 90'; Qirtimov (yellow card) 90+3'	Report	Najafov (yellow card) 20'; Hajiyev (yellow card) 74'; Souza 81'; Pusi 90+5' (yellow card) 90+6'; John (yellow card) 90+6'; Guliyev (yellow card) 90+6'	Stadium: City Stadium; Referee: Rauf Jabarov

20 April 2024 31	Qarabağ	2–2	Gabala	Baku
16:30 AZT (UTC+4)	Medina (yellow card) 35'; Benzia 66'; Zoubir 71'; Hüseynov (yellow card) 88'	Report	Aouacheria 19'; Ochihava (yellow card) 61'; Akakpo 85'	Stadium: Tofiq Bahramov Republican Stadium; Referee: Farid Haciyev

28 April 2024 32	Gabala	0–1	Kapaz	Qabala
15:30 AZT (UTC+4)	Ochihava (yellow card) 6'; Hüseynli (yellow card) 15'; Mammadov (yellow card) 73'; Shahniyarov (yellow card) 82'	Report	Júnior 7'; Jafarov (yellow card) 51'; Rodrigues (yellow card) 89'	Stadium: City Stadium; Referee: Ingilab Mammadov

6 May 2024 33	Sabail	2–3	Gabala	Baku
19:00 AZT (UTC+4)	Ramalingom 17' (pen.); Nuno 40' (pen.); Lugasi (yellow card) 67'	Report	Ochihava (yellow card) 14'; Khalaila 20', 56' (pen.); Allach 32'; Safarov (yellow card) 62'; Ramazanov (yellow card) 83'	Stadium: Bayil Arena; Referee: Ali Aliyev

12 May 2024 34	Gabala	2–0	Sabah	Qabala
17:00 AZT (UTC+4)	Allach 34'; Clésio 45+2'; Ochihava (yellow card) 80'; Musayev (yellow card) 81'; Aliyev (yellow card) 90'	Report	Letić (yellow card) 31'; Volkovi (red card) 65'; Irazabal (yellow card) 90+2'	Stadium: City Stadium; Referee: Elcin Masiyev

19 May 2024 35	Gabala	2–0	Araz-Naxçıvan	Qabala
16:00 AZT (UTC+4)	Safarov (yellow card) 38'; Khalaila 51'; Aouacheria (yellow card) 80'; Allach 87'	Report	Kadiri (yellow card) 12'; Azzaoui (yellow card) 25'; Wanderson (yellow card) 25'; Rzayev (yellow card) 49'; Kuzmanović (yellow card) 90+2'	Stadium: City Stadium; Referee: Elvin Bayramov

25 May 2024 36	Sumgayit	1–0	Gabala	Sumgait
19:00 AZT (UTC+4)	Aliyev (yellow card) 27'; Sorga 52'; Mustafayev (yellow card) 82'; Abdullazade (yellow card) 90+3'	Report	Isaiah (yellow card) 22'; Ahmadov (yellow card) 55'; Ramazanov (yellow card) 62'; Allach (yellow card) 83'	Stadium: Kapital Bank Arena; Referee: Tural Qurbanov

=== Azerbaijan Cup ===
19 December 2023 Last 16	İmişli	0–1	Gabala	Qabala
16:00 AZT (UTC+4)	Isayev (yellow card) 51'; Tamazov (yellow card) 55'; Mammadov (yellow card) 90'	Report	Isgandarov (yellow card) 64'; Bakhshali 90+3'	Stadium: City Stadium; Attendance: 70; Referee: Emin Aliyev

31 January 2024 Quarterfinal 1st leg	Araz-Naxçıvan	1–1	Gabala	Baku
16:00 AZT (UTC+4)	Mashike 45+1'; Wanderson (yellow card) 62'	Report	Tetteh 11'; Khalaila (yellow card) 29'; Mammadov (yellow card) 43'; Áfrico (red card) 77'	Stadium: Dalga Arena; Attendance: 180; Referee: Rauf Allahverdiyev

9 February 2024 Quarterfinal 2nd leg	Gabala	2–0 (3–1 agg.)	Araz-Naxçıvan	Qabala
16:00 AZT (UTC+4)	Akel (yellow card) 23'; Khalaila 39'; Abbasov 42'; Mammadov (yellow card) 90+2'; Atangana (yellow card) 90+3'	Report	Rodrigues (yellow card) 14'; Igor (yellow card) 16'; Kadiri (yellow card) 74'; Wanderson (yellow card) 90+5'	Stadium: City Stadium; Attendance: 200; Referee: İnqilab Mammadov

3 April 2024 Semifinal 1st leg	Zira	2–1	Gabala	Zirə
19:30 AZT (UTC+4)	Soumah 51'; Utzig 68'	Report	Abbasov (yellow card) 33'; Qirtimov (yellow card) 45+1'; Abu Akel 90' (yellow card) 90'	Stadium: Zira Olympic Sport Complex Stadium; Attendance: 600; Referee: İnqilab Məmmədov

24 April 2024 Semifinal 2nd leg	Gabala	0–2 (1–4 agg.)	Zira	Qabala
17:00 AZT (UTC+4)	Mammadov (yellow card) 20'	Report	Kulach (yellow card) 19' (goal) 62'; Zebli (yellow card) 78'; Bayramov (yellow card) 82'; Utzig 85'	Stadium: City Stadium; Attendance: 850; Referee: Tural Gurbanov

=== UEFA Europa Conference League ===
==== Second qualifying round ====
27 July 2023 1st leg	Gabala (Azerbaijan)	2–3	(Cyprus) Omonia	Qabala, Azerbaijan
20:00 AZT (UTC+4)	Allach 4', 62' (yellow card) 86'; Musayev (yellow card) 80'	Report	Coulibaly (yellow card) 24'; Bezus 45+1', 50', 82' (pen.) (yellow card) 57'; Kakoullis (yellow card) 87'; Semedo (yellow card) 90+3'	Stadium: Gabala City Stadium; Attendance: 1,957; Referee: Andrei Chivulete (Romania)

3 August 2023 2nd leg	Omonia (Cyprus)	4–1 (7–3 agg.)	(Azerbaijan) Gabala	Nicosia, Cyprus
21:00 AZT (UTC+4)	Bezus 5', 30' (pen.); Lang 38'; Semedo 59'	Report	Atangana (yellow card) 29'; Safarov (yellow card) 40'; Isaiah 56'	Stadium: GSP Stadium; Referee: Adam Ladebäck (Sweden)

== Squad statistics ==
As of match played 25 May 2024

=== Appearances and goals ===
No.	Pos	Nat	Player	Total		Premier League		Azerbaijan Cup		Europa Conference League	
No.	Pos	Nat	Player	Apps	Goals	Apps	Goals	Apps	Goals	Apps	Goals
1	GK	(Azerbaijan) AZE	Rashad Azizli	22	0	20	0	2	0	0	0
2	DF	(Azerbaijan) AZE	Ilkin Qirtimov	30	0	20+4	0	4	0	2	0
3	DF	(Ukraine) UKR	Zurab Ochihava	24	0	15+6	0	1+2	0	0	0
4	DF	(Brazil) BRA	Lucas Áfrico	35	1	29+1	1	3	0	2	0
5	DF	(Azerbaijan) AZE	Rauf Hüseynli	35	1	26+4	1	3	0	0+2	0
7	FW	(Azerbaijan) AZE	Emil Safarov	36	1	27+2	1	5	0	2	0
9	MF	(Morocco) MAR	Ayyoub Allach	40	7	33	5	4+1	0	2	2
10	FW	(Mozambique) MOZ	Clésio	13	1	6+5	1	0+2	0	0	0
11	MF	(Azerbaijan) AZE	Asif Mammadov	19	0	4+11	0	2+2	0	0	0
12	DF	(Azerbaijan) AZE	Nicat Aliyev	22	0	8+10	0	3+1	0	0	0
13	GK	(Cameroon) CMR	Christophe Atangana	21	0	16	0	3	0	2	0
14	FW	(Azerbaijan) AZE	Ulvi Isgandarov	26	1	10+11	1	0+3	0	2	0
17	MF	(Togo) TOG	Yaovi Akakpo	20	1	2+14	1	1+1	0	0+2	0
18	FW	(Azerbaijan) AZE	Mehrac Bakhshali	18	1	0+15	0	0+2	1	0+1	0
19	FW	(Ghana) GHA	Samuel Tetteh	25	3	13+8	2	3+1	1	0	0
20	MF	(France) FRA	Bilel Aouacheria	42	6	29+6	6	5	0	0+2	0
25	DF	(Azerbaijan) AZE	İbrahim Ramazanov	4	0	4	0	0	0	0	0
27	MF	(Azerbaijan) AZE	Eşqin Ahmadov	5	0	4+1	0	0	0	0	0
28	DF	(Azerbaijan) AZE	Murad Musayev	35	1	20+9	1	4	0	2	0
30	MF	(Azerbaijan) AZE	Shahin Shahniyarov	9	0	3+5	0	0+1	0	0	0
33	DF	(Azerbaijan) AZE	Huseyn Mursalov	2	0	0+1	0	0+1	0	0	0
34	DF	(Azerbaijan) AZE	Urfan Abbasov	38	2	31	1	4+1	1	2	0
71	FW	(Azerbaijan) AZE	Senan Ağalarov	1	0	0+1	0	0	0	0	0
72	FW	(Israel) ISR	Osama Khalaila	40	10	28+5	9	5	1	2	0
77	MF	(Azerbaijan) AZE	Okan Tahmazli	2	0	0+2	0	0	0	0	0
97	MF	(Azerbaijan) AZE	Emil Süleymanov	1	0	0+1	0	0	0	0	0
99	MF	(Nigeria) NGR	Ahmed Isaiah	26	1	20+3	0	1	0	2	1
Players away on loan:
Players who left Gabala during the season:
6	MF	(Israel) ISR	Fares Abu Akel	9	1	3+3	0	1+2	1	0	0
8	MF	(Israel) ISR	Gilad Abramov	23	0	12+7	0	0+2	0	0+2	0
10	MF	(Jordan) JOR	Omar Hani	20	0	13+4	0	1	0	2	0

=== Goal scorers ===
Place	Position	Nation	Number	Name	Premier League	Azerbaijan Cup	Europa Conference League	Total
1	FW	(Israel)	72	Osama Khalaila	9	1	0	10
2	MF	(Morocco)	9	Ayyoub Allach	6	0	2	7
3	MF	(France)	20	Bilel Aouacheria	6	0	0	6
4	FW	(Ghana)	19	Samuel Tetteh	2	1	0	3
5	DF	(Azerbaijan)	34	Urfan Abbasov	1	1	0	2
6	DF	(Azerbaijan)	5	Rauf Hüseynli	1	0	0	1
6	DF	(Brazil)	4	Lucas Áfrico	1	0	0	1
6	DF	(Azerbaijan)	28	Murad Musayev	1	0	0	1
6	FW	(Azerbaijan)	7	Emil Safarov	1	0	0	1
6	FW	(Azerbaijan)	14	Ulvi Isgandarov	1	0	0	1
6	MF	(Togo)	17	Yaovi Akakpo	1	0	0	1
6	FW	(Mozambique)	10	Clésio	1	0	0	1
6	FW	(Azerbaijan)	18	Mehrac Bakhshali	0	1	0	1
6	MF	(Israel)	6	Fares Abu Akel	0	1	0	1
6	MF	(Nigeria)	99	Ahmed Isaiah	0	0	1	1
				TOTALS	30	5	3	38

=== Clean sheets ===
Place	Position	Nation	Number	Name	Premier League	Azerbaijan Cup	Europa Conference League	Total
1	GK	(Azerbaijan)	1	Rashad Azizli	6	0	0	6
2	GK	(Cameroon)	13	Christophe Atangana	1	2	0	3
				TOTALS	7	2	0	9

=== Disciplinary record ===
Number	Nation	Position	Name	Premier League		Azerbaijan Cup		Europa Conference League		Total	
Number	Nation	Position	Name	Yellow card	Red card	Yellow card	Red card	Yellow card	Red card	Yellow card	Red card
1	(Azerbaijan)	GK	Rashad Azizli	2	0	0	0	0	0	2	0
2	(Azerbaijan)	DF	Ilkin Qirtimov	5	1	1	0	0	0	6	1
3	(Ukraine)	DF	Zurab Ochihava	12	1	0	0	0	0	12	1
4	(Brazil)	DF	Lucas Áfrico	4	1	0	1	0	0	4	2
5	(Azerbaijan)	DF	Rauf Hüseynli	8	0	0	0	0	0	8	0
7	(Azerbaijan)	FW	Emil Safarov	9	1	0	0	1	0	10	1
9	(Morocco)	MF	Ayyoub Allach	5	1	0	0	1	0	6	1
11	(Azerbaijan)	MF	Asif Mammadov	5	0	3	0	0	0	8	0
12	(Azerbaijan)	DF	Nicat Aliyev	1	0	0	0	0	0	1	0
13	(Cameroon)	GK	Christophe Atangana	2	0	1	0	1	0	4	0
14	(Azerbaijan)	FW	Ulvi Isgandarov	1	1	1	0	0	0	2	1
17	(Togo)	MF	Yaovi Akakpo	2	0	0	0	0	0	2	0
18	(Azerbaijan)	FW	Mehrac Bakhshali	1	0	0	0	0	0	1	0
19	(Ghana)	FW	Samuel Tetteh	1	1	0	0	0	0	1	1
20	(France)	MF	Bilel Aouacheria	6	0	0	0	0	0	6	0
25	(Azerbaijan)	DF	İbrahim Ramazanov	2	0	0	0	0	0	2	0
27	(Azerbaijan)	MF	Eşqin Ahmadov	1	0	0	0	0	0	1	0
28	(Azerbaijan)	DF	Murad Musayev	5	0	0	0	1	0	6	0
30	(Azerbaijan)	MF	Shahin Shahniyarov	1	0	0	0	0	0	1	0
34	(Azerbaijan)	DF	Urfan Abbasov	4	0	1	0	0	0	5	0
36	(Azerbaijan)	GK	Elməddin Sultanov	1	0	0	0	0	0	1	0
72	(Israel)	FW	Osama Khalaila	4	1	1	0	0	0	5	1
99	(Nigeria)	MF	Ahmed Isaiah	5	0	0	0	0	0	5	0
Players away on loan:
Players who left Gabala during the season:
6	(Israel)	MF	Fares Abu Akel	2	1	2	0	0	0	4	1
8	(Israel)	MF	Gilad Abramov	5	0	0	0	0	0	5	0
10	(Jordan)	MF	Omar Hani	3	0	0	0	0	0	3	0
			TOTALS	97	9	10	1	4	0	111	10
