= 2022–23 Gabala FK season =

Gabala
2022-23 season
- Chairman: Fariz Najafov
- Manager: Elmar Bakhshiyev
- Stadium: City Stadium
- Premier League: 4th
- Azerbaijan Cup: Champions
- UEFA Europa Conference League: Second qualifying round vs Fehérvár
- Top goalscorer: League: Isnik Alimi (9); All: Isnik Alimi (12)
Home colours	Away colours

The 2022–23 season was Gabala FK's 18th season, and their 17th in the Azerbaijan Premier League, the top-flight of Azerbaijani football.

== Season events ==
On 23 May 2022, Gabala announced the signing of Ilkin Qirtimov to a one-year contract from Shamakhi.

On 4 June, Gabala announced the signing of Salahat Aghayev to a one-year contract from Sabah.

On 16 June, Gabala announced the signing of Felipe Santos to a one-year contract, with the option of a second, from Shamakhi.

On 5 July, Gabala announced the signing of Fares Abu Akel to a one-year contract, with the option of a second, from Ashdod.

On 30 July, Gabala announced the signing of Ramon to a one-year contract from Neftçi.

On 10 August, Gabala announced the signing of Andriy Stryzhak to a one-year contract, with the option of a second, from Međimurje.

On 6 February, Gabala announced the signing of Ayyoub Allach to an 18-month contract from Virton.

== Squad ==
As of match played 3 June 2023

No.	Name	Nationality	Position	Date of birth (age)	Signed from	Signed in	Contract ends	Apps.	Goals
Goalkeepers
1	Səlahət Ağayev	(Azerbaijan)	GK	4 January 1991 (aged 32)	Sabah	2022	2023	34	0
13	Christophe Atangana	(Cameroon)	GK	2 March 2000 (aged 23)	Bilbao Athletic	2021	2023	15	0
36	Elməddin Sultanov	(Azerbaijan)	GK	7 May 2001 (aged 22)	Trainee	2021		0	0
Defenders
2	Ilkin Qirtimov	(Azerbaijan)	DF	4 November 1990 (aged 32)	Shamakhi	2022	2023	38	0
4	Ruan Renato	(Brazil)	DF	14 January 1994 (aged 29)	Ponte Preta	2021	2022(+1)	72	4
12	Rufat Ahmadov	(Azerbaijan)	DF	22 September 2002 (aged 20)	Trainee	2020		30	0
16	Nicat Aliyev	(Azerbaijan)	DF	24 September 2001 (aged 21)	Sumgayit	2022		0	0
27	Magsad Isayev	(Azerbaijan)	DF	7 June 1994 (aged 28)	Sabail	2021	2023	73	4
28	Murad Musayev	(Azerbaijan)	DF	13 June 1994 (aged 28)	Zira	2019		104	3
33	Huseyn Mursalov	(Azerbaijan)	DF	12 July 2002 (aged 20)	Trainee	2021		5	0
34	Urfan Abbasov	(Azerbaijan)	DF	14 October 1992 (aged 30)	Sabail	2021		267	4
Midfielders
5	Isnik Alimi	(Albania)	MF	2 February 1994 (aged 29)	Atalanta	2021		73	22
6	Fares Abu Akel	(Israel)	MF	8 February 1997 (aged 26)	Ashdod	2022	2023 (+1)	38	2
7	Rovlan Muradov	(Azerbaijan)	MF	28 March 1998 (aged 25)	Trainee	2017		117	12
8	Andriy Stryzhak	(Ukraine)	MF	22 October 1999 (aged 23)	Međimurje	2022	2023 (+1)	7	0
9	Ayyoub Allach	(Morocco)	MF	28 January 1998 (aged 25)	Virton	2023	2024	16	3
10	Omar Hani	(Jordan)	MF	27 June 1999 (aged 23)	APOEL	2021	2022 (+1)	65	4
11	Asif Mammadov	(Azerbaijan)	MF	5 August 1986 (aged 36)	Inter Baku	2015		233+	16
17	Yaovi Akakpo	(Togo)	MF	11 March 1999 (aged 24)		2019		10	2
20	Rauf Rustamli	(Azerbaijan)	MF	11 January 2003 (aged 20)	Trainee	2021		1	0
97	Felipe Santos	(Brazil)	MF	3 January 1997 (aged 26)	Shamakhi	2022	2023 (+1)	43	6
Forwards
14	Ulvi Isgandarov	(Azerbaijan)	FW	17 April 1998 (aged 25)	Trainee	2017		114	20
18	Mehrac Bakhshali	(Azerbaijan)	FW	11 June 2003 (aged 19)	Trainee	2022		1	0
23	Raphael Utzig	(Brazil)	FW	8 August 1996 (aged 26)	Paraná	2020	2022	94	18
77	Emil Safarov	(Azerbaijan)	FW	30 October 2002 (aged 20)	Trainee	2021		57	4
91	Ramon	(Brazil)	FW	4 April 1991 (aged 32)	Neftçi	2022	2023	37	10
Out on loan
Left during the season

== Transfers ==
=== In ===
Date	Position	Nationality	Name	From	Fee	Ref.
23 May 2022	DF	(Azerbaijan)	Ilkin Qirtimov	Shamakhi	Undisclosed	
4 June 2022	GK	(Azerbaijan)	Salahat Aghayev	Sabah	Undisclosed	
16 June 2022	MF	(Brazil)	Felipe Santos	Shamakhi	Undisclosed	
5 July 2022	MF	(Israel)	Fares Abu Akel	Ashdod	Undisclosed	
30 July 2022	FW	(Brazil)	Ramon	Neftçi	Undisclosed	
10 August 2022	MF	(Ukraine)	Andriy Stryzhak	Međimurje	Undisclosed	
6 February 2023	MF	(Morocco)	Ayyoub Allach	Virton	Undisclosed	

=== Released ===
Date	Position	Nationality	Name	Joined	Date	Ref
5 June 2023	DF	(Azerbaijan)	Magsad Isayev	Zira	22 June 2024	
14 June 2023	GK	(Azerbaijan)	Səlahət Ağayev	Sabail	14 June 2023	
14 June 2023	MF	(Ukraine)	Andriy Stryzhak	HAŠK Zagreb		

== Friendlies ==
5 July 2022	Gaziantep	2 – 1	Gabala	Karacasu, Turkey
17:30 AZT (UTC+4)	Djilobodji 7'; Maxim 66'	Report	Isgandarov 70'	Stadium: Bolu Termal Otel Tesisleri

12 January 2023	Gabala	2 – 2	Sepsi Sfântu Gheorghe	Antalya, Turkey
16:00 AZT (UTC+4)	Isgandarov 7'; Alimi 63' (pen.); (red card) 83'	Report	Rondón 46'; Ștefănescu 76' (pen.)	Stadium: Arcadia Sports Center

14 January 2023	FSV 63 Luckenwalde	2 – 3	Gabala	Antalya, Turkey
13:00 AZT (UTC+4)	Goal	Report	Asadov 30'; Ramon 57'; Felipe 70'	Stadium: Arcadia Sports Center

16 January 2023	Teplice	2 – 1	Gabala	Antalya, Turkey
17:00 AZT (UTC+4)	Goal	Report	Ramon	Stadium: Arcadia Sports Center

== Competitions ==
=== Overview ===
Competition	First match	Last match	Starting round	Final position	Record							
Competition	First match	Last match	Starting round	Final position	Pld	W	D	L	GF	GA	GD	Win %
Premier League	8 August 2022	28 May 2023	Matchday 1	4th	36	13	11	12	47	47	+0	36.11
Azerbaijan Cup	22 November 2022	3 June 2023	First Round	Winners	6	5	1	0	13	4	+9	83.33
UEFA Europa Conference League	21 July 2022	28 July 2022	Second qualifying round	Second qualifying round	2	1	0	1	5	3	+2	50.00
Total					44	19	12	13	65	54	+11	43.18

Last updated: 3 June 2023
Source: Competitions

=== Premier League ===
==== Results summary ====
Overall								Home						Away					
Pld	W	D	L	GF	GA	GD	Pts	W	D	L	GF	GA	GD	W	D	L	GF	GA	GD
36	13	11	12	47	47	0	50	8	4	6	22	21	+1	5	7	6	25	26	−1

Last updated: 28 May 2023.
Source: See Results

==== Results by round ====
Round	1	2	3	4	5	6	7	8	9	10	11	12	13	14	15	16	17	18	19	20	21	22	23	24	25	26	27	28	29	30	31	32	33	34	35	36
Ground	A	H	A	H	A	H	H	A	H	A	H	A	H	A	A	H	A	H	A	H	A	H	H	A	H	A	H	A	H	A	A	H	A	H	A	H
Result	W	W	W	L	L	L	W	W	L	D	D	L	W	L	D	W	L	D	D	L	D	D	W	D	L	D	W	L	W	W	W	W	L	L	D	D
Position	3	4	1	3	4	6	4	4	5	5	5	5	4	5	5	5	5	5	5	5	5	5	5	5	5	5	5	5	4	4	4	4	4	4	4	4

Updated to match(es) played on 28 May 2023. Source: See Results
A = Away; H = Home; W = Win; D = Draw; L = Loss

==== Results ====
8 August 2022 1	Turan Tovuz	0 – 2	Gabala	Tovuz
17:00 AZT (UTC+4)	Marakvelidze (red card) 32'; Turabov (yellow card) 57'	Report	Musayev (yellow card) 51'; Alimi 58' (pen.); Utzig 63'; Abu Akel (yellow card) 90+7'; Rustamli (yellow card) 90+10'	Stadium: City Stadium; Referee: Raad Ahmadov

14 August 2022 2	Gabala	3 – 1	Shamakhi	Qabala
18:20 AZT (UTC+4)	Muradov 8'; Musayev 10'; Felipe 20'; Ruan (yellow card) 61'	Report	Dashdamirov (yellow card) 39'; Hüseynli (yellow card) 42'; Yunanov 56'	Stadium: City Stadium; Referee: Farid Haciyev

21 August 2022 3	Kapaz	0 – 3	Gabala	Qabala
18:00 AZT (UTC+4)		Report	Isayev 18'; Alimi (yellow card) 23'; Ramon 27'; Muradov 57'; Hani (yellow card) 76'	Stadium: City Stadium; Referee: Rauf Allahverdiyev

28 August 2022 4	Gabala	0 – 2	Sabah	Qabala
20:00 AZT (UTC+4)	Isayev (yellow card) 11'; Felipe (yellow card) 61'; Ruan (yellow card) 66'; Raphael (yellow card) 66'; Abu Akel (yellow card) 87'	Report	Volkovi 48'; Mickels 64' (yellow card) 66'; Isayev (yellow card) 66'; Mutallimov (yellow card) 66'	Stadium: City Stadium; Referee: Aliyar Aghayev

4 September 2022 5	Zira	2 – 1	Gabala	Zirə
20:30 AZT (UTC+4)	Sadykhov 45', 74'; Nazirov (yellow card) 90+6'	Report	Mammadov (yellow card) 31'; Alimi 35' (pen.); Hani (yellow card) 40'	Stadium: Zira Olympic Sport Complex Stadium; Referee: Rauf Jabbarov

10 September 2022 6	Gabala	1 – 2	Neftçi	Qabala
18:00 AZT (UTC+4)	Isayev 32'; Qirtimov (yellow card) 82'	Report	Mahmudov (yellow card) 22'; Jaber 46', 53'; Eddy (yellow card) 86'; Hajiyev (yellow card) 88'; Mammadov (yellow card) 90+3'	Stadium: City Stadium; Referee: Ravan Hamzazada

17 September 2022 7	Gabala	1 – 0	Sumgayit	Qabala
19:00 AZT (UTC+4)	Ramon 7'; Muradov (red card) 84'; Utzig (yellow card) 85'; Ruan (yellow card) 90+3'; Ağayev (yellow card) 90+6'	Report	Abdullazade (yellow card) 85'; Nurmugamet (yellow card) 90+5'	Stadium: City Stadium; Referee: Elcin Masiyev

30 September 2022 8	Sabail	1 – 2	Gabala	Baku
19:00 AZT (UTC+4)	França (yellow card) 33' (yellow-red card) 44'; Gurbanli (yellow card) 53'; Ramazanov 61' (pen.); Chekh (yellow card) 90'	Report	Alimi (yellow card) 23' (goal) 54' (pen.); Isgandarov 90'; Safarov (yellow card) 90'	Stadium: Bayil Arena; Referee: Farid Haciyev

9 October 2022 9	Gabala	0 – 1	Qarabağ	Qabala
17:00 AZT (UTC+4)	Qirtimov (red card) 43'; Abu Akel (yellow card) 68'	Report	Ozobić 58'; Qurbanlı (yellow card) 76'	Stadium: City Stadium; Referee: Nicat İsmayıllı

14 October 2022 10	Shamakhi	1 – 1	Gabala	Shamakhi
15:00 AZT (UTC+4)	K.Guliyev 75'; Mirzayev (yellow card) 90'; Naghiyev (yellow card) 90+3'	Report	Mammadov (yellow card) 45'; Naghiyev 60' (o.g.); Isayev (yellow card) 85'; Abu Akel (yellow card) 90'	Stadium: City Stadium; Referee: Rauf Allahverdiyev

22 October 2022 11	Gabala	1 – 1	Kapaz	Qabala
16:00 AZT (UTC+4)	Ramon (yellow card) 16'; Alimi 20'	Report	Khvalko (yellow card) 20'; F.Nabiyev 61'	Stadium: City Stadium; Referee: Raad Ahmadov

30 October 2022 12	Sabah	2 – 1	Gabala	Masazır
18:30 AZT (UTC+4)	Camalov (yellow card) 4'; Irazabal (yellow card) 34'; Letić (yellow card) 48'; Kashchuk 63'; Ba (yellow card) 90'; Volkovi 90+3'	Report	Alimi 5' (pen.); Abu Akel (yellow card) 59'; Rustamli (yellow card) 71'; Qirtimov (yellow card) 90'	Stadium: Bank Respublika Arena; Referee: Tural Qurbanov

5 November 2022 13	Gabala	1 – 0	Zira	Qabala
15:00 AZT (UTC+4)	Felipe (yellow card) 4'; Safarov (yellow card) 14'; Abu Akel (yellow card) 86'; Isgandarov 90+3'; Mursalov (yellow card) 90+4'	Report	Khalilzade (yellow card) 34'; Pachtmann (yellow card) 88'	Stadium: City Stadium; Referee: Rauf Jabbarov

12 November 2022 14	Neftçi	2 – 0	Gabala	Baku
17:30 AZT (UTC+4)	Saief (yellow card) 21' (goal) 24'; Mbodj (yellow card) 45+1'; Hajiyev 76'	Report	Abu Akel (yellow card) 48'; Felipe (yellow card) 61'; Ruan (yellow card) 63'; Qirtimov (yellow card) 85'	Stadium: Bakcell Arena; Referee: Nicat İsmayıllı

29 November 2022 15	Sumgayit	1 – 1	Gabala	Sumgait
16:30 AZT (UTC+4)	Ahmadov (yellow card) 30'; Todoroski 79'; Abdullazade (yellow card) 82'; Abdullazade (yellow card) 90+2'	Report	Alimi 74' (pen.)	Stadium: Kapital Bank Arena; Referee: Elcin Masiyev

3 December 2022 16	Gabala	2 – 1	Sabail	Qabala
14:30 AZT (UTC+4)	Abu Akel 35' (yellow card) 90'; Isgandarov 65'	Report	Kizito 5'; Cardozo (yellow card) 38'; Chekh (yellow card) 57'	Stadium: City Stadium; Referee: Raad Ahmadov

13 December 2022 17	Qarabağ	1 – 0	Gabala	Baku
19:00 AZT (UTC+4)	Qarayev (yellow card) 55'; Sheydayev 68' (pen.)	Report	Musayev (yellow card) 86'; Ruan (yellow card) 90+5'	Stadium: Azersun Arena; Referee: Kamranbay Rahimov

24 December 2022 18	Gabala	0 – 0	Turan Tovuz	Qabala
15:00 AZT (UTC+4)	Musayev (yellow card) 38'; Ruan (yellow card) 83'; Ramon (yellow card) 86'	Report	Marakvelidze (yellow card) 90+4'	Stadium: City Stadium; Referee: Kamal Umudlu

24 January 2023 19	Kapaz	2 – 2	Gabala	Ganja
14:00 AZT (UTC+4)	Ingilabli (yellow card) 12'; Isaiah 18' (pen.); Maranhense 42' (pen.)	Report	Abu Akel (yellow card) 10'; Abbasov (yellow card) 17'; Ruan 63'; Isgandarov 79'; Felipe (yellow card) 80'	Stadium: Ganja City; Referee: Elcin Masiyev

1 February 2023 20	Gabala	0 – 3	Sabah	Qabala
15:00 AZT (UTC+4)	Ruan (yellow card) 21' (yellow-red card) 27'; Ağayev (yellow card) 27'; Alimi (yellow card) 27'; Musayev (yellow card) 28'; Isayev (yellow card) 76'	Report	Seydiyev (yellow card) 16'; Camalov (yellow card) 45'; Volkovi (yellow card) 53' (goal) 61'; Irazabal 70'; Nuriyev (yellow card) 75'; Ceballos (yellow card) 87'; Mickels 89'	Stadium: City Stadium; Referee: Vugar Hasanli

5 February 2023 21	Zira	2 – 2	Gabala	Zirə
16:00 AZT (UTC+4)	Hajili (yellow card) 10'; Chantakias 15' (yellow card) 33'; Brogno 57'	Report	Utzig 3'; Abbasov (yellow card) 21'; Abu Akel (yellow card) 33'; Safarov (yellow card) 46'; Felipe 78'; Hani (yellow card) 90+4'	Stadium: Zira Olympic Sport Complex Stadium; Referee: Kamal Umudlu

10 February 2023 22	Gabala	0 – 0	Neftçi	Qabala
15:00 AZT (UTC+4)	Abu Akel (yellow card) 40'; Felipe (yellow card) 46'	Report		Stadium: City Stadium; Referee: Farid Haciyev

18 February 2023 23	Gabala	2 – 1	Sumgayit	Qabala
15:00 AZT (UTC+4)	Alimi (yellow card) 30'; Isgandarov 45'; Abu Akel (yellow card) 45+3'; Utzig 56'; Ruan (yellow card) 90+4'	Report	Hüseynov (yellow card) 45+3'; Mustafayev (yellow card) 65'; Alimi 85' (o.g.); Todoroski (yellow card) 90+2'	Stadium: City Stadium; Referee: Aliyar Aghayev

24 February 2023 24	Sabail	2 – 2	Gabala	Baku
19:00 AZT (UTC+4)	Abbasov 51'; Ljujić 55'; Taghiyev (yellow card) 89'	Report	França 20' (o.g.); Ruan (yellow card) 53'; Ramon 70'	Stadium: Bayil Arena; Referee: Javid Jalilov

5 March 2023 25	Gabala	1 – 3	Qarabağ	Qabala
17:00 AZT (UTC+4)	Alimi 31' (yellow card) 42'; Isayev (yellow card) 37'	Report	Richard (yellow card) 22'; Romão (yellow card) 31'; Sheydayev 38' (pen.), 68' (pen.); Qurbanlı 56'; Mustafazadə (yellow card) 81'; Medina (yellow card) 90+4'	Stadium: City Stadium; Referee: Kamal Umudlu

11 March 2023 26	Turan Tovuz	1 – 1	Gabala	Tovuz
15:00 AZT (UTC+4)	Wankewai 19' (pen.); Marakvelidze (yellow card) 68'; Bayramov (yellow card) 90+4'	Report	Felipe 39'; Qirtimov (yellow card) 68'; Safarov (yellow card) 90+5'	Stadium: City Stadium; Referee: Rauf Jabarov

17 March 2023 27	Gabala	2 – 0	Shamakhi	Qabala
17:00 AZT (UTC+4)	Allach 20', 45+1'	Report	Safarov (yellow card) 66'; Mammadov (yellow card) 69'	Stadium: City Stadium; Referee: Raad Ahmadov

2 April 2023 28	Sabah	3 – 2	Gabala	Masazır
18:00 AZT (UTC+4)	Qirtimov 9' (o.g.); Mickels 86'; Kashchuk 90+5'	Report	Isgandarov 21'; Abu Akel 28'; Isayev (yellow card) 30'; Felipe (yellow card) 45+1'; Musayev (yellow card) 77'; Alimi (yellow card) 88'	Stadium: Bank Respublika Arena; Referee: Javid Jalilov

7 April 2023 29	Gabala	2 – 1	Zira	Qabala
17:00 AZT (UTC+4)	Ramon 58'; Qirtimov (yellow card) 67'; Ruan 80' (yellow card) 80'	Report	Luković (yellow card) 39'; Taşqın (yellow card) 65'; Kuliyev 69'	Stadium: City Stadium; Referee: Tural Qurbanov

14 April 2023 30	Neftçi	1 – 2	Gabala	Baku
20:00 AZT (UTC+4)	Yusifli (yellow card) 28'; Kvirkvelia (yellow card) 59'; Mahmudov 61' (pen.)	Report	Ramon 13'; Muradov (yellow card) 18'; Alimi 24' (pen.) (yellow card) 68'; Ruan (yellow card) 59'; Ağayev (yellow card) 69'; Qirtimov (yellow card) 90+6'	Stadium: Bakcell Arena; Referee: Kamranbay Rahimov

23 April 2023 31	Sumgayit	2 – 3	Gabala	Sumgait
18:00 AZT (UTC+4)	Isgandarli (yellow card) 23' (goal) 58'; Todoroski (yellow card) 52'; Abubakar 63'; Valiev (yellow card) 87'	Report	Utzig (yellow card) 27'; Abbasov (yellow card) 52'; Alimi (yellow card) 60'; Abu Akel (yellow card) 73'; Hani 74'; Safarov 78'; Ramon 90+4'; Stryzhak (yellow card) 90+4'; Felipe (yellow card) 90+5'	Stadium: Kapital Bank Arena; Referee: Rauf Jabbarov

1 May 2023 32	Gabala	4 – 2	Sabail	Qabala
17:30 AZT (UTC+4)	Ramon 21', 90+4'; Stasyuk (yellow card) 38'; Allach 49'	Report	Tagiyev (yellow card) 35'; Ljujić (yellow card) 39'; Hajiyev 69'; Abbasov 85'	Stadium: City Stadium; Referee: Rauf Allahverdiyev

8 May 2023 33	Qarabağ	3 – 0	Gabala	Baku
20:00 AZT (UTC+4)	Cafarguliyev 43'; Romão (yellow card) 64'; Zoubir 75'; Sheydayev 84'; Richard (yellow card) 89'	Report	Isayev (yellow card) 69'; Qirtimov (yellow card) 90+1'	Stadium: Azersun Arena; Referee: Ravan Hamzazada

13 May 2023 34	Gabala	1 – 2	Turan Tovuz	Qabala
18:00 AZT (UTC+4)	Abbasov (yellow card) 53' (yellow-red card) 57'; Alimi (yellow card) 62'; Qirtimov (yellow card) 65'; Utzig 66'; Muradov (yellow card) 90'	Report	Guliyev (yellow card) 36' (goal) 54'; Najafov (yellow card) 62'; Xulu 90+5'	Stadium: City Stadium; Referee: Nicat İsmayıllı

22 May 2023 35	Shamakhi	0 – 0	Gabala	Shamakhi
16:30 AZT (UTC+4)	Mammadov (yellow card) 56'	Report	Safarov (yellow card) 44'	Stadium: City Stadium; Referee: Farid Haciyev

28 May 2023 36	Gabala	1 – 1	Kapaz	Qabala
17:30 AZT (UTC+4)	Alimi 45+4' (pen.); Isayev (yellow card) 61'; Safarov (yellow card) 75'; Hani (yellow card) 90+3'	Report	Kvirkvia (yellow card) 73'; Alijanov (yellow card) 77'; Musayev 80' (o.g.)	Stadium: City Stadium; Referee: Javid Jalilov

==== League table ====
Pos	Team	Pld	W	D	L	GF	GA	GD	Pts	Qualification
2	Sabah	36	25	6	5	75	24	+51	81	Qualification to Europa Conference League second qualifying round
3	Neftçi	36	20	8	8	63	38	+25	68	Qualification to Europa Conference League second qualifying round
4	Gabala	36	13	11	12	47	47	0	50	Qualification to Europa Conference League second qualifying round
5	Zira	36	13	11	12	45	46	−1	50	
6	Turan Tovuz	36	10	9	17	36	49	−13	39	

Source: Soccerway
Rules for classification: 1) Points; 2) Head-to-head points; 3) Head-to-head goal difference; 4) Head-to-head goals scored; 5) Head-to-head away goals scored (only if two teams); 6) Goal difference; 7) Goals scored.

=== Azerbaijan Cup ===
22 November 2022 First Round	Gabala	5 – 0	Araz	Qabala
15:00 AZT (UTC+4)	Isayev 29'; Ramon 56'; Alimi 60'; Felipe 63'; Isgandarov 74'	Report	Rustamov (yellow card) 90+1'	Stadium: Gabala City Stadium; Referee: Kamranbey Rahimov

8 December 2022 Quarterfinal 1st leg	Qarabağ	2 – 2	Gabala	Baku
20:30 AZT (UTC+4)	Qurbanlı 55', 83'	Report	Safarov 25'; Alimi (yellow card) 74'; Hani (yellow card) 83' (goal) 86'	Stadium: Azersun Arena; Referee: Aliyar Aghayev

19 December 2022 Quarterfinal 2nd leg	Gabala	1 – 0 (3 – 2 agg.)	Qarabağ	Qabala
16:00 AZT (UTC+4)	Alimi (yellow card) 16'; Safarov (yellow card) 23'; Qirtimov (yellow card) 35'; Ramon (yellow card) 61' (goal) 71'	Report	A.Hüseynov (yellow card) 50'; Richard (yellow card) 82'; Mammadov (yellow card) 90+3'	Stadium: City Stadium; Referee: Inqilab Mammadov

18 April 2023 Semifinal 1st leg	Gabala	3 – 2	Sabail	Qabala
18:00 AZT (UTC+4)	Mammadov (yellow card) 30'; Utzig 34', 66'; Abbasov (yellow card) 44'; Santos 74'	Report	Martinov (yellow card) 7' (goal) 21'; Muradov 9'	Stadium: City Stadium; Attendance: 1,300; Referee: Elchin Masiyev

27 April 2023 Semifinal 2nd leg	Sabail	0 – 1 (2 – 4 agg.)	Gabala	Baku
20:00 AZT (UTC+4)	Hasanov (yellow card) 28' (yellow-red card) 47'; Naghiyev (yellow card) 63' (yellow-red card) 90+5'; Gomis (yellow card) 68'; Ljujić (yellow card) 75'; França (yellow card) 78' (yellow-red card) 90+1'	Report	Alimi 48' (pen.) (yellow card) 75'; Utzig (yellow card) 73'; Abu Akel (yellow card) 90+1'; Mammadov (yellow card) 90+2'	Stadium: Bayil Arena; Attendance: 1,300; Referee: Aliyar Aghayev

==== Final ====
3 June 2023	Neftçi	0 – 1 (a.e.t.)	Gabala	Baku
20:00 AZT (UTC+4)	Eddy (yellow card) 65'; Kvirkvelia (yellow card) 65'; Haghverdi (yellow card) 108'	Report	Isayev (yellow card) 65'; Allach (yellow card) 65'; Alimi 102' (yellow card) 120'	Stadium: Bakcell Arena; Referee: Inqilab Mammadov

=== UEFA Europa Conference League ===
==== Qualifying phase ====
21 July 2022 Second qualifying round 1st leg	Fehérvár (Hungary)	4 – 1	(Azerbaijan) Gabala	Székesfehérvár, Hungary
21:00 AZT (UTC+4)	Kodro 30', 74'; Petryak (yellow card) 60'; Rus 67'; Zivzivadze 90'	Report	Utzig 16'; Isayev (yellow card) 45'; Musayev (yellow card) 68' (yellow-red card) 86'; Safarov (yellow card) 88'	Stadium: MOL Aréna Sóstó; Attendance: 4,750; Referee: Kaspar Sjöberg (Sweden)

28 July 2022 Second qualifying round 2nd leg	Gabala (Azerbaijan)	2 – 1 (3 – 5 agg.)	(Hungary) Fehérvár	Qabala, Azerbaijan
20:00 AZT (UTC+4)	Alimi (yellow card) 10'; Muradov 34' (yellow card) 69'; Ruan (yellow card) 55'; Felipe 73'; Qirtimov (yellow card) 74'	Report	Fiola (yellow card) 35'; Zivzivadze 44'; Stopira (yellow card) 57'; Négo (yellow card) 80'; Shabanov (yellow card) 90+4'	Stadium: Gabala City Stadium; Attendance: 1,800; Referee: Christopher Jäger (Austria)

== Squad statistics ==
As of match played 3 June 2023

=== Appearances and goals ===
No.	Pos	Nat	Player	Total		Premier League		Azerbaijan Cup		UEFA Europa Conference League	
No.	Pos	Nat	Player	Apps	Goals	Apps	Goals	Apps	Goals	Apps	Goals
1	GK	(Azerbaijan) AZE	Səlahət Ağayev	34	0	30	0	2	0	2	0
2	DF	(Azerbaijan) AZE	Ilkin Qirtimov	38	0	30	0	6	0	2	0
4	DF	(Brazil) BRA	Ruan Renato	41	2	33	2	6	0	2	0
5	MF	(Albania) ALB	Isnik Alimi	41	12	34	9	5	3	2	0
6	MF	(Israel) ISR	Fares Abu Akel	38	2	30+1	2	4+1	0	2	0
7	MF	(Azerbaijan) AZE	Rovlan Muradov	40	3	20+13	2	1+4	0	2	1
8	MF	(Ukraine) UKR	Andriy Stryzhak	7	0	0+6	0	1	0	0	0
9	MF	(Morocco) MAR	Ayyoub Allach	16	3	9+4	3	2+1	0	0	0
10	MF	(Jordan) JOR	Omar Hani	40	2	10+23	1	2+3	1	1+1	0
11	MF	(Azerbaijan) AZE	Asif Mammadov	35	0	18+12	0	2+1	0	2	0
12	DF	(Azerbaijan) AZE	Rufat Ahmadov	1	0	0	0	0	0	0+1	0
13	GK	(Cameroon) CMR	Christophe Atangana	10	0	6	0	4	0	0	0
14	FW	(Azerbaijan) AZE	Ulvi Isgandarov	40	7	9+24	6	2+3	1	0+2	0
17	MF	(Togo) TOG	Yaovi Akakpo	4	0	0+4	0	0	0	0	0
18	FW	(Azerbaijan) AZE	Mehrac Bakhshali	1	0	0+1	0	0	0	0	0
20	MF	(Azerbaijan) AZE	Rauf Rustamli	1	0	0+1	0	0	0	0	0
23	FW	(Brazil) BRA	Raphael Utzig	36	7	24+6	4	3+1	2	2	1
27	DF	(Azerbaijan) AZE	Magsad Isayev	42	3	34	2	6	1	2	0
28	DF	(Azerbaijan) AZE	Murad Musayev	36	1	25+5	1	4+1	0	1	0
33	DF	(Azerbaijan) AZE	Huseyn Mursalov	2	0	0+1	0	0+1	0	0	0
34	DF	(Azerbaijan) AZE	Urfan Abbasov	19	0	11+3	0	2+3	0	0	0
77	FW	(Azerbaijan) AZE	Emil Safarov	37	2	12+19	1	4+1	1	0+1	0
91	FW	(Brazil) BRA	Ramon	37	10	26+6	8	4+1	2	0	0
97	MF	(Brazil) BRA	Felipe Santos	43	6	35	3	6	2	2	1
Players away on loan:
Players who left Gabala during the season:

=== Goal scorers ===
Place	Position	Nation	Number	Name	Premier League	Azerbaijan Cup	UEFA Europa Conference League	Total
1	MF	(Albania)	5	Isnik Alimi	9	3	0	12
2	FW	(Brazil)	91	Ramon	8	2	0	10
3	FW	(Azerbaijan)	14	Ulvi Isgandarov	6	1	0	7
3	FW	(Brazil)	23	Raphael Utzig	4	2	1	7
5	MF	(Brazil)	97	Felipe Santos	3	2	1	6
6	MF	(Morocco)	9	Ayyoub Allach	3	0	0	3
6	DF	(Azerbaijan)	27	Magsad Isayev	2	1	0	3
6	MF	(Azerbaijan)	7	Rovlan Muradov	2	0	1	3
6				Own goal	3	0	0	3
10	MF	(Israel)	6	Fares Abu Akel	2	0	0	2
10	DF	(Brazil)	4	Ruan Renato	2	0	0	2
10	FW	(Azerbaijan)	77	Emil Safarov	1	1	0	2
10	MF	(Jordan)	10	Omar Hani	1	1	0	2
14	DF	(Azerbaijan)	28	Murad Musayev	1	0	0	1
				TOTALS	47	13	3	63

=== Clean sheets ===
Place	Position	Nation	Number	Name	Premier League	Azerbaijan Cup	UEFA Europa Conference League	Total
1	GK	(Azerbaijan)	1	Səlahət Ağayev	7	1	0	8
2	GK	(Cameroon)	13	Christophe Atangana	1	3	0	4
				TOTALS	8	4	0	12

=== Disciplinary record ===
Number	Nation	Position	Name	Premier League		Azerbaijan Cup		UEFA Europa Conference League		Total	
Number	Nation	Position	Name	Yellow card	Red card	Yellow card	Red card	Yellow card	Red card	Yellow card	Red card
1	(Azerbaijan)	GK	Səlahət Ağayev	3	0	0	0	0	0	3	0
2	(Azerbaijan)	DF	Ilkin Qirtimov	8	1	1	0	1	0	10	1
4	(Brazil)	DF	Ruan Renato	12	1	0	0	1	0	13	1
5	(Albania)	MF	Isnik Alimi	10	0	3	0	1	0	14	0
6	(Israel)	MF	Fares Abu Akel	13	0	1	0	0	0	14	0
7	(Azerbaijan)	MF	Rovlan Muradov	2	1	0	0	1	0	3	1
8	(Ukraine)	MF	Andriy Stryzhak	1	0	0	0	0	0	1	0
9	(Morocco)	MF	Ayyoub Allach	0	0	1	0	0	0	1	0
10	(Jordan)	MF	Omar Hani	5	0	0	0	0	0	5	0
11	(Azerbaijan)	MF	Asif Mammadov	2	0	2	0	0	0	4	0
20	(Azerbaijan)	MF	Rauf Rustamli	2	0	0	0	0	0	2	0
23	(Brazil)	FW	Raphael Utzig	3	0	1	0	0	0	4	0
27	(Azerbaijan)	DF	Magsad Isayev	7	0	1	0	1	0	9	0
28	(Azerbaijan)	DF	Murad Musayev	5	0	0	0	2	1	7	1
33	(Azerbaijan)	DF	Huseyn Mursalov	1	0	0	0	0	0	1	0
34	(Azerbaijan)	DF	Urfan Abbasov	5	1	1	0	0	0	6	1
77	(Azerbaijan)	FW	Emil Safarov	6	0	1	0	1	0	8	0
91	(Brazil)	FW	Ramon	2	0	1	0	0	0	3	0
97	(Brazil)	MF	Felipe Santos	7	0	0	0	0	0	7	0
Players who left Gabala during the season:
			TOTALS	94	4	13	0	8	1	115	5
