= Yaovi Akakpo =

Togolese footballer

Personal information
- Full name: Yaovi Roger Akakpo
- Date of birth: 11 March 1999 (age 27)
- Place of birth: Togo
- Height: 1.77 m (5 ft 10 in)
- Position: Winger

Youth career
- 2017–2019: Pumas

Senior career*
Years	Team	Apps	(Gls)
2020–2024	Gabala	26	(3)
- * Club domestic league appearances and goals as of 28 May 2024

Yaovi Akakpo (born 1999) is a Togolese professional footballer who plays as a winger, most recently for Gabala in the Azerbaijan Premier League.

== Career ==
=== Club ===
On 20 February 2020, Akakpo signed 2.5 years contract with Gabala FK.

On 22 February 2020, Akakpo made his debut in the Azerbaijan Premier League for Gabala match against Neftçi Baku.

On 22 May 2022, Gabala announced that Akakpo had signed a new one-year contract with the club.

On 27 May 2024, Gabala announced that Akakpo and five others had left the club with their contracts expiring.

== Career statistics ==
=== Club ===
As of match played 25 May 2024

Appearances and goals by club, season and competition
Club	Season	League			National Cup		Continental		Other		Total	
Club	Season	Division	Apps	Goals	Apps	Goals	Apps	Goals	Apps	Goals	Apps	Goals
Gabala	2019–20	Azerbaijan Premier League	1	0	0	0	0 (Note: Appearances in the UEFA Europa League)	0	—		1	0
Gabala	2020–21	Azerbaijan Premier League	1	0	0	0	—				1	0
Gabala	2021–22	Azerbaijan Premier League	4	2	0	0	—				4	2
Gabala	2022–23	Azerbaijan Premier League	4	0	0	0	0 (Note: Appearances in the UEFA Europa Conference League)	0	—		4	0
Gabala	2023–24	Azerbaijan Premier League	16	1	2	0	2	0	—		20	1
Gabala	Total		26	3	2	0	2	0	-	-	30	3
Career total			26	3	2	0	2	0	-	-	30	3
