= Emil Safarov =

Azerbaijani footballer (born 2002)

Personal information
- Full name: Emil Jeyhun oglu Safarov
- Date of birth: 30 October 2002 (age 24)
- Place of birth: Azerbaijan
- Height: 1.75 m (5 ft 9 in)
- Position: Central midfielder

Team information
- Current team: Neftçi
- Number: 7

Youth career
- Gabala

Senior career*
Years	Team	Apps	(Gls)
2021–2024	Gabala	76	(4)
2024–	Neftçi	43	(4)

International career^{‡}
2022–	Azerbaijan U21	2	(0)
2023–	Azerbaijan	11	(0)
- * Club domestic league appearances and goals as of 22 June 2026 ‡ National team caps and goals as of 4 October 2026

Emil Safarov (Azerbaijani: Emil Səfərov; born 30 October 2002) is an Azerbaijani professional footballer who plays as a midfielder for Azerbaijan Premier League club Neftçi PFK and the Azerbaijan national team.

== Career ==
=== Club ===
On 21 August 2021, Safarov made his debut in the Azerbaijan Premier League for Gabala against Keşla. On 6 June 2023, Safarov extended his contract with Gabala for an additional two years.

On 29 June 2024, Safarov signed a three-year contract with Neftçi PFK.

== Career statistics ==
=== Club ===
As of match played 2 September 2023

Appearances and goals by club, season and competition
Club	Season	League			National Cup		Continental		Other		Total	
Club	Season	Division	Apps	Goals	Apps	Goals	Apps	Goals	Apps	Goals	Apps	Goals
Gabala	2021–22	Azerbaijan Premier League	16	2	4	0	-		-		20	2
Gabala	2022–23	Azerbaijan Premier League	31	1	5	1	1	0	-		37	2
Gabala	2023–24	Azerbaijan Premier League	29	1	5	0	2	0	-		36	1
Gabala	Total		76	4	14	1	3	0	-	-	93	5
Career total			76	4	14	1	3	0	-	-	93	5
