= Ayyoub Allach =

Moroccan footballer

Personal information
- Date of birth: 28 January 1998 (age 28)
- Place of birth: Mechelen, Belgium
- Height: 1.80 m (5 ft 11 in)
- Position: Midfielder

Team information
- Current team: Araz-Naxçıvan
- Number: 9

Youth career
- –2013: JMG Academy
- 2013–2014: Lierse

Senior career*
Years	Team	Apps	(Gls)
2014–2018	Lierse	43	(2)
2019–2020	Swope Park Rangers	25	(2)
2020–2021	Lierse Kempenzonen	26	(6)
2021–2023	Virton	40	(6)
2023–2024	Gabala	46	(8)
2024–2025	Sheriff Tiraspol	11	(4)
2025–	Araz-Naxçıvan	7	(0)

International career
2015	Morocco U20	3	(0)
- * Club domestic league appearances and goals as of 8 April 2025

Ayyoub Allach (born 28 January 1998) is a professional footballer who plays as a midfielder for Araz-Naxçıvan PFK in the Azerbaijan Premier League. Born in Belgium, he has represented Morocco at youth level.

== Career ==
On 6 February 2023, Gabala announced the signing of Allach to an 18-month contract. On 27 May 2024, Gabala announced that Allach and five others had left the club with their contracts expiring.

On 4 July 2024, Moldovan Super Liga club Sheriff Tiraspol announced the signing of Allach.

On February 6, 2025, Azerbaijan's club Araz-Nakhchivan signed a 6-month + 1-year contract with Allach.

== Career statistics ==
=== Club ===
As of match played 25 May 2024.

Club	Season	League			Cup		Continental		Other		Total	
Club	Season	Division	Apps	Goals	Apps	Goals	Apps	Goals	Apps	Goals	Apps	Goals
Lierse	2013–14	Belgian Pro League	1	0	0	0	–		0	0	1	0
Lierse	2014–15	Belgian Pro League	1	0	0	0	–		0	0	1	0
Lierse	2015–16	Belgian Second Division	22	2	1	0	–		0	0	22	2
Lierse	2016–17	First Division B	7	0	2	0	–		0	0	9	0
Lierse	2017–18	First Division B	15	0	1	0	–		8 (Note: Appearances in the Appearances in Belgian First Division European play-offs)	0	24	0
Lierse	Total		45	2	3	0	0	0	8	0	56	2
Swope Park Rangers	2019	USL	25	2	0	0	–		0	0	25	2
Lierse Kempenzonen	2019-20	First Amateur Division	8	1	0	0	–		0	0	8	1
Lierse Kempenzonen	2020-21	First Division B	18	5	0	0	-		0	0	18	5
Lierse Kempenzonen	Total		26	6	0	0	0	0	0	0	26	6
Excelsior Virton	2021-22	First Amateur Division	26	4	0	0	–		0	0	26	4
Excelsior Virton	2022-23	Challenger Pro League	14	2	0	0	-		0	0	14	2
Excelsior Virton	Total		40	6	0	0	0	0	0	0	26	6
Gabala	2022–23	Azerbaijan Premier League	13	3	3	0	0 (Note: Appearances in the UEFA Europa Conference League)	0	-		16	3
Gabala	2023–24	Azerbaijan Premier League	33	5	5	0	2	2	-		40	7
Gabala	Total		46	8	8	0	2	2	-	-	56	10
Sheriff Tiraspol	2024–25	Moldovan Super Liga	0	0	0	0	0	0	0	0	0	0
Career total			131	15	9	0	2	2	8	0	150	17
