= Christophe Atangana =

Cameroonian footballer

Personal information
- Full name: Christophe Atangana Assimba
- Date of birth: 2 March 2000 (age 26)
- Place of birth: Douala, Cameroon
- Height: 1.82 m (6 ft 0 in)
- Position: Goalkeeper

Youth career
- Iturrigorri
- 2010–2016: Athletic Bilbao

Senior career*
Years	Team	Apps	(Gls)
2016–2018	Basconia	27	(0)
2018–2021	Bilbao Athletic	0	(0)
2018–2019	→ Leioa (loan)	6	(0)
2019	→ Leioa (loan)	2	(0)
2020	→ Somorrostro (loan)	6	(0)
2020–2021	→ Arenas (loan)	5	(0)
2021–2024	Gabala	36	(0)

International career
2018	Cameroon U20	4	(0)
- * Club domestic league appearances and goals as of 12 May 2024

Christophe Atangana Assimba (born 2 March 2000) is a Cameroonian footballer who plays as a goalkeeper.

== Club career ==
Atangana started his career with Spanish La Liga side Athletic Bilbao, having lived in the city since childhood. In 2016 he made his senior debut for Basconia, Athletic's farm team, in the fourth tier.

In 2018, he was promoted to the reserve team Bilbao Athletic but was deemed to be only the fourth choice (behind Unai Etxebarria, Hodei Oleaga and Ander Iru) and was sent on loan to local third-tier club Leioa where he was backup to the more experienced Urtzi Iturrioz. At the start of 2019–20 Atangana found himself behind new signings Jokin Ezkieta and Julen Agirrezabala in the selection queue in Bilbao and returned to Leioa, but again played rarely so switched to Somorrostro (fourth tier) mid-season in search of more match action, only for that campaign to be curtailed by the COVID-19 pandemic. He spent the 2020–21 season on loan at Arenas (third tier) but was unable to displace Diego Carrio as the regular starting goalkeeper.

In August 2021, after being released by Athletic Bilbao, Atangana signed for Gabala in Azerbaijan. On 10 December 2021, he debuted for Gabala during a 2–1 win over MOIK. On 17 August 2024, Gabala announced that Atangana had left the club after his contract was terminated by mutual consent.

== International career ==
Atangana was selected for the Cameroon under-20 team for the 2019 Africa U-20 Cup of Nations qualification fixtures, in which his team eliminated Uganda over two legs but lost to Mali.

== Career statistics ==
=== Club ===
As of match played 28 April 2024

Appearances and goals by club, season and competition
Club	Season	League			National Cup		Continental		Other		Total	
Club	Season	Division	Apps	Goals	Apps	Goals	Apps	Goals	Apps	Goals	Apps	Goals
Gabala	2021–22	Azerbaijan Premier League	2	0	3	0	-		-		5	0
Gabala	2022–23	Azerbaijan Premier League	6	0	4	0	0	0	-		10	0
Gabala	2023–24	Azerbaijan Premier League	16	0	3	0	2	0	-		21	0
Gabala	Total		24	0	10	0	2	0	-	-	36	0
Career total			24	0	10	0	2	0	-	-	36	0
