= Zurab Ochihava =

Ukrainian footballer

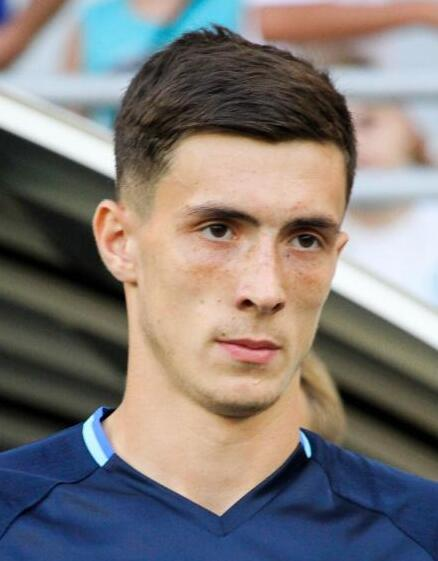

Personal information
- Full name: Zurab Tamazovych Ochihava
- Date of birth: 18 May 1995 (age 31)
- Place of birth: Kyiv, Ukraine
- Height: 1.86 m (6 ft 1 in)
- Position: Defender

Youth career
- 2004–2005: Zirka Kyiv
- 2005–2010: Youth Sportive School #15 Kyiv
- 2010–2011: Lider Borshchahivka

Senior career*
Years	Team	Apps	(Gls)
2013–2015	Illichivets Mariupol	7	(0)
2015–2019	Dynamo Kyiv	8	(0)
2015–2016	→ Dynamo-2 Kyiv	16	(1)
2017–2018	→ Olimpik Donetsk (loan)	13	(1)
2019	→ Dnipro-1 (loan)	8	(1)
2019	Vorskla Poltava	3	(0)
2020	Levadia Tallinn	18	(2)
2021–2023	Sabah	34	(2)
2023–2024	Gabala	21	(0)
Total		128	(7)

International career^{‡}
2015	Ukraine U20	2	(0)
2016	Ukraine U21	1	(0)
- * Club domestic league appearances and goals as of 30 May 2024 ‡ National team caps and goals as of 20 February 2021

Zurab Tamazovych Ochihava (Ukrainian: Зураб Тамазович Очігава; Georgian: ზურაბ ოჩიგავა; born 18 May 1995) is a Ukrainian retired professional footballer.

== Career ==
He is a product of a different Kyiv's sportive schools.

He made his début for FC Illichivets Mariupol in the Ukrainian Premier League on 20 September 2014.

=== Dynamo Kyiv ===
In January 2019, he joined Dnipro-1 on loan.

=== Sabah ===
On 18 February 2021, Sabah announced the signing of Ochihava.

=== Gabala ===
On 24 June 2023, Gabala announced the signing of Ochihava from Sabah to a two-year contract. On 30 August 2024, Gabala announced that Ochihava had left the club after his contract was ended by mutual agreement.

== Personal life ==
His mother is a Ukrainian and his father is a Georgian.
