= Samuel Tetteh =

Ghanaian footballer (born 1996)

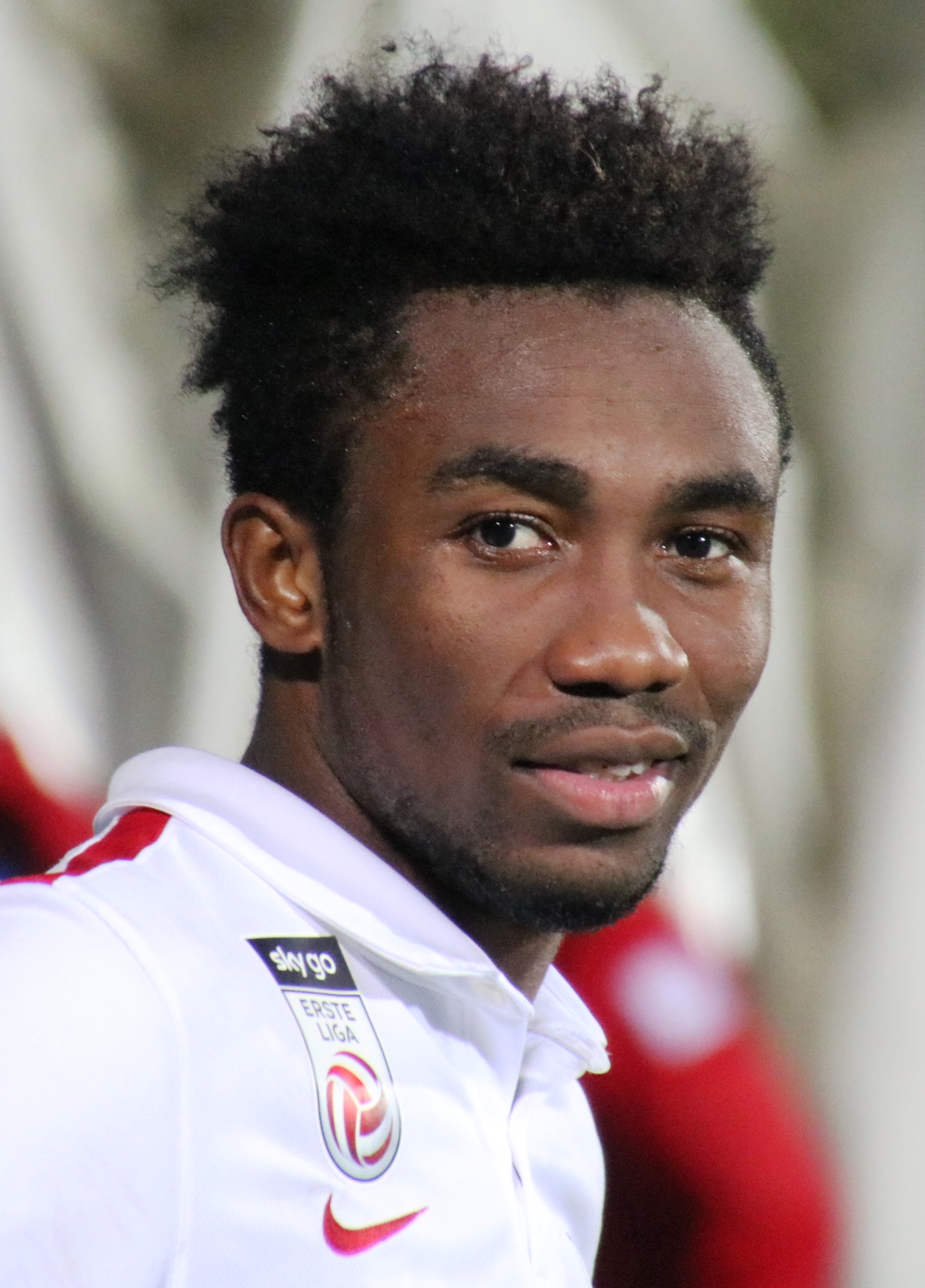
- Tetteh with Liefering in 2016

Personal information
- Date of birth: 28 July 1996 (age 30)
- Place of birth: Accra, Ghana
- Height: 1.80 m (5 ft 11 in)
- Position: Forward

Senior career*
Years	Team	Apps	(Gls)
2014–2016	WAFA	13	(5)
2016–2017	FC Liefering	26	(12)
2017–2021	Red Bull Salzburg	0	(0)
2018–2020	→ LASK (loan)	66	(16)
2020	→ New York Red Bulls (loan)	10	(0)
2021	→ SKN St. Pölten (loan)	17	(1)
2021–2023	Adanaspor	49	(11)
2023	→ Bandırmaspor (loan)	12	(1)
2023–2024	Gabala	21	(2)

International career^{‡}
	Ghana U-20	5	(1)
2015–	Ghana	8	(1)
- * Club domestic league appearances and goals as of 4 October 2024 ‡ National team caps and goals as of 30 May 2018

Samuel Tetteh (born 28 July 1996) is a Ghanaian professional footballer who plays as a forward for the Ghana national team.

== Club career ==
=== Early career ===
Tetteh started playing for the West African Football Academy in 2014. He played in the 2016 season which he scored 5 goals in 13 matches and was labeled as one of the rising stars in the Ghana Premier League and scoring against Asante Kotoko S.C. in his debut match. He started attracting scouts and teams from Europe due to his good form and being seen as a future prospect.

=== FC Liefering ===
Tetteh joined FC Liefering the feeder club of Red Bull Salzburg during the summer of 2016. In his debut season for the Austrian side he scored 10 goals and provided assists for 5 goals, meaning he contributed to 15 goals in 20 matches.

=== LASK ===
Due to his impressive displays for FC Liefering, in January 2017, Tetteh was promoted into the Red Bull Salzburg squad.

Tetteh was loaned out to fellow Austrian club LASK for one and half season starting from January 2018. He ended the 2017–18 season with 5 goals 6 assists helping the team to a 4th place and qualification into the Europa league.

=== New York Red Bulls ===
On 11 August 2020, Tetteh moved on loan to MLS side New York Red Bulls for the 2020 season with a club option to make the transfer permanent. On 30 November 2020, New York declined to make the deal for Tetteh permanent.

=== SKN St. Pölten ===
On 19 January 2021, Tetth moved on loan to Austrian Bundesliga side SKN St. Pölten.

=== Gabala ===
On 5 September 2023, Gabala announced the singing of Tetteh to a two-year contract from Adanaspor.

On 4 October 2024, Gabala announced the departure of Tetteh by mutual agreement.

== International career ==
Tetteh made his first senior international appearance in a friendly against Congo on 1 September 2015, having substituted Solomon Asante in the 90th minute. On 3 September 2016, Tetteh scored his first international goal for Ghana.

== Career statistics ==
=== Club ===
As of match played on 27 February 2020

Appearances and goals by club, season and competition
Club	Season	League			Cup		League Cup		Other		Total	
Club	Season	Division	Apps	Goals	Apps	Goals	Apps	Goals	Apps	Goals	Apps	Goals
WAFA	2016	Ghanaian Premier League	13	5	0	0	—				13	5
FC Liefering	2016–17	Austrian Football First League	20	10	0	0	—				20	10
FC Liefering	2017–18	Austrian Football First League	6	2	0	0	—				6	2
FC Liefering	Total		26	12	0	0	0	0	0	0	26	12
Red Bull Salzburg	2017–18	Austrian Football Bundesliga	0	0	1	0	—		1	0	2	0
Red Bull Salzburg	Total		0	0	1	0	0	0	1	0	2	0
LASK (loan)	2017–18	Austrian Football Bundesliga	16	5	—		—		—		16	5
LASK (loan)	2018–19	Austrian Football Bundesliga	21	4	3	2	—		4	1	28	7
LASK (loan)	2019–20	Austrian Football Bundesliga	29	7	3	0	—		10	0	42	7
LASK (loan)	Total		66	16	6	2	0	0	14	1	86	19
Career totals			105	33	7	2	0	0	15	1	127	36

=== International goals ===
Scores and results list Ghana's goal tally first.

No	Date	Venue	Opponent	Score	Result	Competition
1.	3 September 2016	Accra Sports Stadium, Accra, Ghana	Rwanda	1–0	1–1	2017 Africa Cup of Nations qualification
