= Rauf Hüseynli =

Azerbaijani footballer (born 2000)

Personal information
- Full name: Rauf Eldar oglu Hüseynli
- Date of birth: 25 January 2000 (age 26)
- Place of birth: Azerbaijan
- Height: 1.85 m (6 ft 1 in)
- Position: Right-back

Team information
- Current team: Kapaz
- Number: 5

Youth career
- Qarabağ

Senior career*
Years	Team	Apps	(Gls)
2019–2022	Qarabağ	1	(1)
2020–2021	→ Zira (loan)	5	(0)
2022–2023	Shamakhi	31	(1)
2023–2024	Gabala	30	(1)
2024–2025	Kapaz	27	(2)
2025–	Kapaz	24	(5)

International career
2018–2019	Azerbaijan U19	5	(3)
2020–2022	Azerbaijan U21	12	(1)
- * Club domestic league appearances and goals as of 22 June 2026

Rauf Hüseynli (Azerbaijani: Rauf Hüseynli; born 25 January 2000) is an Azerbaijani footballer who plays as a right-back for Azerbaijan Premier League club Kapaz.

== Club career ==
On 1 February 2020, Huseynli made his debut in the Azerbaijan Premier League for Zira match against Sabah.

On 9 July 2024, Gabala announced the signing of Hüseynli from Shamakhi to a one-year contract.

On 3 September 2024, he signed a 1+1 year contract with Kapaz PFK. On 9 July 2025, his expired contract with the club was not renewed. On 10 October 2025, he returned to Kapaz until the end of the 2025–26 season.
