= Ahmed Isaiah =

Nigerian footballer

Personal information
- Date of birth: 10 October 1995 (age 31)
- Place of birth: Lagos, Nigeria
- Height: 1.76 m (5 ft 9 in)
- Position: Midfielder

Youth career
- Ribeirão

Senior career*
Years	Team	Apps	(Gls)
2013–2015	Ribeirão	40	(5)
2015–2016	AD Oliveirense	29	(10)
2016–2018	Vilaverdense	53	(14)
2018–2021	Gil Vicente	40	(6)
2021	→ Varzim (loan)	16	(1)
2021	Sporting da Covilhã	18	(1)
2022	Zira	10	(1)
2022–2023	Kapaz	32	(4)
2023–2024	Gabala	23	(0)
2024–2025	Al-Quwa Al-Jawiya	25	(0)
- * Club domestic league appearances and goals as of 17 December 2024

Ahmed Isaiah (born 10 October 1995) is a Nigerian professional footballer who most recently played for Iraqi club Al-Quwa Al-Jawiya.

== Career ==
=== Club ===
On 4 July 2022, Isaiah left Zira.

On 23 June 2023, Isaiah signed a one-year contract with Gabala. On 27 May 2024, Gabala announced that Isaiah and five others had left the club with their contracts expiring.

== Career statistics ==
=== Club ===
As of match played 25 May 2024.

Club	Season	League			Cup		Continental		Other		Total	
Club	Season	Division	Apps	Goals	Apps	Goals	Apps	Goals	Apps	Goals	Apps	Goals
Zira	2021–22	Azerbaijan Premier League	10	1	4	0	-		-		14	1
Kapaz	2022–23	Azerbaijan Premier League	32	4	3	0	-		-		35	4
Gabala	2023–24	Azerbaijan Premier League	23	0	1	0	2 (Note: Appearances in the UEFA Europa Conference League)	1	-		26	1
Career total			65	5	8	0	2	1	-	-	75	6
