= Bilel Aouacheria =

French footballer (born 1994)

Personal information
- Full name: Bilel Aouacheria
- Date of birth: 2 April 1994 (age 32)
- Place of birth: Saint-Étienne, France
- Height: 1.82 m (6 ft 0 in)
- Position: Right winger

Team information
- Current team: Al-Najma
- Number: 26

Youth career
- 2002–2014: Saint-Étienne

Senior career*
Years	Team	Apps	(Gls)
2012–2014	Saint-Étienne B	42	(0)
2014–2017	Covilhã	60	(11)
2016–2017	→ Sporting CP B (loan)	38	(5)
2017–2020	Moreirense	76	(5)
2020–2021	Farense	18	(1)
2021–2023	Gil Vicente	46	(1)
2023–2024	Gabala	35	(6)
2024–	Al-Najma	0	(0)
- * Club domestic league appearances and goals as of 15 June 2024

Bilel Aouacheria (born 2 April 1994) is a French professional footballer who plays as a right winger for Saudi First Division League club Al-Najma.

He spent his professional career in Portugal, where he made over 100 Primeira Liga appearances for Moreirense, Farense and Gil Vicente. He also achieved a century of appearances in the second tier, with Covilhã and Sporting B.

== Club career ==
Born in Saint-Étienne, Aouacheria began his career at hometown club AS Saint-Étienne, where he represented the reserve team in the fourth and fifth tiers. In 2014, he moved to S.C. Covilhã of Portugal's Segunda Liga. He was loaned to Sporting CP B in the same league in August 2016.

In August 2017, Aouacheria signed a three-year deal with Moreirense F.C. in the Primeira Liga. The following 4 March, he scored his first top-flight goal to conclude a 2–0 home win over F.C. Paços de Ferreira.

Free agent Aouacheria signed a two-year deal at S.C. Farense in October 2020. Near the end of a season that ended in relegation, he was sent off for the first time in his career, in the first half hour of a 5–1 loss at FC Porto for a foul on Wilson Manafá.

In June 2021, Aouacheria moved to Gil Vicente F.C. again for two seasons.

On 14 July 2023, Azerbaijan Premier League club Gabala announced the signing of Aouacheria to a two-year contract. On 15 June 2024, Gabala announced that Aouacheria had left the club by mutual agreement following their relegation from the Azerbaijan Premier League.

On 20 September 2024, Aouacheria joined Saudi First Division League club Al-Najma.

== Personal life ==
Aouacheria was born in Saint-Etienne in the center of France. He holds French and Algerian nationalities.
