= Osama Khalaila =

Israeli footballer (born 1998)

Personal information
- Date of birth: 6 April 1998 (age 28)
- Place of birth: Sakhnin, Israel
- Height: 1.88 m (6 ft 2 in)
- Position: Striker

Team information
- Current team: F.C. Ashdod
- Number: 9

Youth career
- 2008–2010: Misgav Regional Council
- 2010–2014: Maccabi Haifa
- 2014–2015: Maccabi Netanya
- 2015–2018: Bnei Sakhnin

Senior career*
Years	Team	Apps	(Gls)
2017–2021	Bnei Sakhnin	70	(17)
2021–2023	Maccabi Tel Aviv	14	(2)
2022–2023	→ Maccabi Bnei Reineh (loan)	24	(1)
2023–2024	Gabala	40	(10)
2024–2025	LNZ Cherkasy	14	(0)
2025–2026	Hapoel Acre	26	(9)
2026–	F.C. Ashdod	6	(0)

International career
2016	Israel U18	2	(0)
2016–2017	Israel U19	11	(2)
2018–2020	Israel U21	8	(0)
2021	Israel	1	(0)
- * Club domestic league appearances and goals as of 24 June 2026

Osama Khalaila (Arabic: أسامة خلايلة, Hebrew: אוסאמה ח'לאילה; born 6 April 1998) is an Israeli professional footballer who plays as a striker, most recently for F.C. Ashdod in Liga Leumit, and the Israel national team.

== Early life ==
Khalaila was born in Sakhnin, Israel, to a Muslim-Arab family. His younger brother is footballer Mohamed Khalaila.

== Club career ==
=== Bnei Sakhnin ===
Khalaila made his debut in the Israeli Premier League on 6 May 2017, coming on as a 66th-minute substitute against Beitar Jerusalem.

=== Maccabi Tel Aviv ===
On 22 July 2021, Khalaila signed a three-year deal with Maccabi Tel Aviv for a fee of €515,000. He made his debut for Maccabi Tel Aviv in the UEFA Europa Conference League on 22 July, coming on as a 72nd-minute substitute against FK Sutjeska Nikšić. He scored two goals in the return fixture on 29 July.

=== Loan to Maccabi Bnei Reineh ===
Khalaila was sent on loan to Maccabi Bnei Reineh on 6 September 2022. He scored his first goal for Bnei Sakhnin on 3 November in a 3–2 victory over Beitar Jerusalem.

=== Gabala ===
On 4 July 2023, Khalaila signed for Gabala on a one-year contract with the option of a second year. On 27 May 2024, Gabala announced that Khalaila and five others had left the club with their contracts expiring.

=== LNZ Cherkasy ===
On 30 August 2024, Khanaila was transferred to LNZ Cherkasy in the Ukrainian Premier League.

== International career ==
Khalaila made his debut for Israel national team as a substitute in a friendly against Portugal on 9 June 2021.

== Career statistics ==
=== Club ===
As of match played 18 January 2023

Appearances and goals by club, season and competition
Club	Season	League			National cup (Note: Includes State Cup.)		League cup (Note: Includes Toto Cup.)		Continental		Other		Total	
Club	Season	Division	Apps	Goals	Apps	Goals	Apps	Goals	Apps	Goals	Apps	Goals	Apps	Goals
Bnei Sakhnin	2017–18	Israeli Premier League	4	0	1	0	2	0	0	0	0	0	7	0
Bnei Sakhnin	2018–19	Israeli Premier League	10	0	2	0	4	0	0	0	0	0	16	0
Bnei Sakhnin	2019–20	Liga Leumit	32	13	2	0	0	0	0	0	0	0	34	13
Bnei Sakhnin	2020–21	Israeli Premier League	24	4	3	0	7	3	0	0	0	0	34	7
Bnei Sakhnin	Total		70	17	8	0	13	3	0	0	0	0	93	20
Maccabi Tel Aviv	2021–22	Israeli Premier League	14	2	4	1	0	0	12	2	1	0	31	3
Maccabi Bnei Reineh (loan)	2022–23	Israeli Premier League	16	1	2	1	0	0	0	0	0	0	18	2
Career total			112	20	12	2	10	2	12	2	1	0	134	25

=== International ===
As of match played 9 June 2022

Appearances and goals by national team and year
National team	Year	Apps	Goals
Israel	2021	1	0
Total		1	0
