= 2021–22 Neftçi PFK season =

Neftchi Baku
2021–22 season
- Manager: Samir Abbasov
- Stadium: Eighth Kilometer District Stadium
- Premier League: 2nd
- Azerbaijan Cup: Semifinal vs Zira
- Champions League: Second qualifying round vs Olympiacos
- Europa League: Third qualifying round vs HJK
- Europa Conference League: Play-off round vs Maccabi Haifa
- Top goalscorer: League: Tiago Bezerra (10); All: Two Players (10)
Home colours	Away colours	Third colours

The Neftçi 2021–22 season was Neftchi Baku's 30th Azerbaijan Premier League season. Neftchi will compete in the Azerbaijan Premier League and in the Azerbaijan Cup and UEFA Champions League.

== Season overview ==
On 25 May, Neftçi signed a new contract with Omar Buludov until 2024.

On 31 May, Neftçi signed a new contract with Fahmin Muradbayli until 2023.

On 2 June, Rahman Hajiyev signed a new contract with Neftçi until the summer of 2024.

On 7 June, Neftçi extended their contract with Mamadou Mbodj until the summer of 2023, with Mirabdulla Abbasov signing a similar contract the following day.

On 12 June, Neftçi announced the signing of César Meza from Keşla to a two-year contract.

On 16 June, Neftçi signed a new one-year contract, with the option of an additional year, with Vojislav Stanković.

On 20 June, Neftçi signed a Harramiz from Estoril.

On 27 June, Neftçi signed a Khayal Najafov from Sumgayit.

On 15 July, Neftçi signed a Romain Basque from Le Havre, with Hugo Basto signing from Estoril on 17 July.

On 14 August, Bursaspor announced the signing of Namik Alaskarov, whilst Neftçi contested the signing stating they still had a valid contract with Alaskarov.

On 1 September, Neftçi announced the signing of Ramon to a one-year contract, whilst also announcing that Mamadou Kané had been sold to Olympiacos before being loaned back to Neftçi until the end of the season.

On 8 September, Neftçi announced the signing of Tiago Bezerra to a one-year contract.

On 17 September, Neftçi announced the signing of Jorge Correa to a two-year contract.

On 29 December, Neftçi announced that Romain Basque had left the club by mutual consent, that they'd signed Azer Salahlı from Keşla to a 2.5year contract and that Fahmin Muradbayli had joined Keşla on loan for the remainder of the season.

On 5 January, Neftçi announced the signing of Eddy Israfilov to a 2.5-year contract.

On 10 January, Sabir Bougrine was sold to Tunisian club Espérance Sportive de Tunis.

On 21 January, Neftçi announced the signing of Guilherme Pato to a 2.5-year contract from Internacional and the departure of Harramiz.

The following day, 22 January, Neftçi announced the signing of Ivan Brkić to a 1.5-year contract from Riga and the departure of Jorge Correa by mutual consent.

On 27 January, Neftçi announced the signing of Azer Aliyev to a 3.5-year contract from Ufa.

== Squad ==
As of match played 21 May 2022

No.	Name	Nationality	Position	Date of birth (age)	Signed from	Signed in	Contract ends	Apps.	Goals
Goalkeepers
1	Ivan Brkić	(Croatia)	GK	29 June 1995 (age 31)	Riga	2022	2023	15	0
12	Kamran Ibrahimov	(Azerbaijan)	GK	7 June 1999 (age 27)	Academy	2015	2022	10	0
30	Agil Mammadov	(Azerbaijan)	GK	1 May 1989 (age 37)	Gabala	2019	2022	102	0
Defenders
3	Mamadou Mbodj	(Senegal)	DF	12 March 1993 (age 33)	Žalgiris	2019	2023	80	9
4	Hugo Basto	(Portugal)	DF	14 May 1993 (age 33)	Estoril	2021	2023	11	0
6	Vojislav Stanković	(Serbia)	DF	22 September 1987 (age 39)	Gabala	2019	2022(+1)	89	6
19	Azer Salahlı	(Azerbaijan)	DF	11 April 1994 (age 32)	Keşla	2021	2024	17	1
20	Mert Çelik	(Azerbaijan)	DF	10 June 2000 (age 26)	loan from İstanbul Başakşehir	2020	2022	38	2
26	Omar Buludov	(Azerbaijan)	DF	15 December 1998 (age 27)	Academy	2016	2024	96	3
40	Vugar Hasanov	(Azerbaijan)	DF	5 December 1997 (age 28)	Keşla	2019		0	0
51	Elchin Asadov	(Azerbaijan)	DF	3 August 1999 (age 27)	Academy	2016		0	0
56	Elton Alibeyli	(Azerbaijan)	DF	4 February 2000 (age 26)	Academy	2021		0	0
82	Rüfat Abbasov	(Azerbaijan)	DF	1 January 2005 (age 21)	Academy	2021		1	0
	Elvin Sarkarov	(Azerbaijan)	DF	24 February 1997 (age 29)	Academy	2016		6	0
Midfielders
7	Azer Aliyev	(Russia)	MF	12 May 1994 (age 32)	Ufa	2022	2025	14	0
8	Emin Mahmudov	(Azerbaijan)	MF	27 April 1992 (age 34)	Boavista	2017	2023	146	31
10	César Meza	(Paraguay)	MF	5 October 1991 (age 35)	Keşla	2021	2023	35	4
14	Eddy Israfilov	(Azerbaijan)	MF	2 August 1992 (age 34)	Unattached	2022	2024	15	2
21	Ismayil Zulfugarli	(Azerbaijan)	MF	16 April 2001 (age 25)	Academy	2019		29	2
24	Yusuf Lawal	(Nigeria)	MF	23 March 1998 (age 28)	Lokeren	2020	2022 (+1)	64	6
27	Farid Yusifli	(Azerbaijan)	MF	20 February 2002 (age 24)	Academy	2019		11	0
37	Vusal Asgarov	(Azerbaijan)	MF	23 August 2001 (age 25)	Academy	2018		12	1
70	Asim Alizada	(Azerbaijan)	MF	5 February 2000 (age 26)	Academy	2020		3	0
72	Emin Zamanov	(Azerbaijan)	MF	26 December 1997 (age 28)	Academy	2019		2	0
73	Ramin Nəsirli	(Azerbaijan)	MF	24 September 2002 (age 24)	Academy	2021		4	1
97	Khayal Najafov	(Azerbaijan)	MF	19 December 1997 (age 28)	Sumgayit	2021	2023	26	0
	Elnur Suleymanov	(Azerbaijan)	MF	17 September 1996 (age 30)	Shuvalan	2017		1	0
Forwards
9	Tiago Bezerra	(Brazil)	FW	17 February 1987 (age 39)	Al-Sailiya	2021	2023	25	10
22	Mirabdulla Abbasov	(Azerbaijan)	FW	27 April 1995 (age 31)	Sumgayit	2017	2023	112	21
55	Ibrahim Aliyev	(Azerbaijan)	FW	17 July 1999 (age 27)	Sumgayit	2020	2022	3	0
77	Guilherme Pato	(Brazil)	FW	17 February 2001 (age 25)	Internacional	2022	2024	15	1
91	Ramon	(Brazil)	FW	4 April 1991 (age 35)	Brasil de Pelotas	2021	2022	28	7
98	Famil Camalov	(Azerbaijan)	FW	8 April 1998 (age 28)	Zagatala	2020		1	0
Away on loan
17	Rahman Hajiyev	(Azerbaijan)	MF	25 July 1993 (age 33)	Baku	2014	2024	166	16
19	Fahmin Muradbayli	(Azerbaijan)	MF	16 March 1996 (age 30)	Academy	2013	2023	95	8
33	Turan Valizade	(Azerbaijan)	MF	1 January 2001 (age 25)	Fenerbahçe	2019	2021	2	0
56	Elton Alibayli	(Azerbaijan)	DF	4 February 2000 (age 26)	Academy	2019		1	0
Left during the season
7	Namik Alaskarov	(Azerbaijan)	MF	3 February 1995 (age 31)	Qarabağ	2017	2022	127	33
7	Jorge Correa	(Argentina)	MF	4 April 1993 (age 33)	Unattached	2021	2023	2	0
11	Harramiz	(São Tomé and Príncipe)	FW	3 August 1990 (age 36)	Estoril	2021	2023	11	0
14	Romain Basque	(France)	MF	30 June 1995 (age 31)	Le Havre	2021		12	0
29	Sabir Bougrine	(Morocco)	MF	10 July 1996 (age 30)	F91 Dudelange	2020	2022	49	6
36	Mamadou Kane	(Guinea)	MF	22 January 1997 (age 29)	loan from Olympiacos	2021	2022	80	1

=== Out on loan ===
Note: Flags indicate national team as defined under FIFA eligibility rules; some limited exceptions apply. Players may hold more than one non-FIFA nationality.

No.	Pos.	Nation	Player
17	MF	AZE	Rahman Hajiyev (at Keşla)
19	MF	AZE	Fahmin Muradbayli (at Keşla)

No.	Pos.	Nation	Player
33	MF	AZE	Turan Valizade (at Keşla)

== Transfers ==
=== In ===
Date	Position	Nationality	Name	From	Fee	Ref.
12 June 2021	MF	(Paraguay)	César Meza	Keşla	Undisclosed	
20 June 2021	FW	(São Tomé and Príncipe)	Harramiz	Estoril	Undisclosed	
27 June 2021	MF	(Azerbaijan)	Khayal Najafov	Sumgayit	Undisclosed	
15 July 2021	MF	(France)	Romain Basque	Le Havre	Undisclosed	
17 July 2021	DF	(Portugal)	Hugo Basto	Estoril	Undisclosed	
1 September 2021	FW	(Brazil)	Ramon	Brasil de Pelotas	Undisclosed	
8 September 2021	FW	(Brazil)	Tiago Bezerra	Al-Sailiya	Undisclosed	
17 September 2021	MF	(Argentina)	Jorge Correa	Unattached	Free	
29 December 2021	DF	(Azerbaijan)	Azer Salahlı	Keşla	Undisclosed	
5 January 2021	MF	(Azerbaijan)	Eddy Israfilov	Unattached	Free	
21 January 2021	FW	(Brazil)	Guilherme Pato	Internacional	Undisclosed	
22 January 2021	GK	(Croatia)	Ivan Brkić	Riga	Undisclosed	
27 January 2021	MF	(Russia)	Azer Aliyev	Ufa	Undisclosed	

=== Loans in ===
Date from	Position	Nationality	Name	From	Date to	Ref.
19 September 2020	MF	(Azerbaijan)	Mert Çelik	İstanbul Başakşehir	End of 2021/22 season	
1 September 2021	MF	(Guinea)	Mamadou Kané	Olympiacos	26 January 2022	

=== Out ===
Date	Position	Nationality	Name	To	Fee	Ref.
1 September 2021	MF	(Guinea)	Mamadou Kané	Olympiacos	Undisclosed	
10 January 2022	MF	(Morocco)	Sabir Bougrine	Espérance Sportive de Tunis	Undisclosed	

=== Loans out ===
Date from	Position	Nationality	Name	To	Date to	Ref.
2 June 2021	MF	(Azerbaijan)	Turan Valizade	Keşla	End of season	
19 August 2021	DF	(Azerbaijan)	Elton Alibeyli	Sabail	7 January 2022	
29 December 2021	MF	(Azerbaijan)	Fahmin Muradbayli	Keşla	End of season	

=== Released ===
Date	Position	Nationality	Name	Joined	Date	Ref.
5 June 2021	MF	(Albania)	Bruno Telushi	Egnatia	5 September 2021	
11 June 2021	GK	(Azerbaijan)	Salahat Aghayev	Sabah	14 June 2021	
16 June 2021	DF	(Azerbaijan)	Anton Krivotsyuk	Wisła Płock	16 June 2021	
17 June 2021	MF	(Japan)	Keisuke Honda	Sūduva	14 September 2021	
24 June 2021	DF	(Brazil)	Rener Pavão	Portimonense	1 July 2021	
26 June 2021	FW	(France)	Steeven Joseph-Monrose	Xanthi		
30 June 2021	DF	(Brazil)	Thallyson	Santo André		
9 July 2021	DF	(Azerbaijan)	Jabir Amirli	Sabail	9 July 2021	
14 August 2021	MF	(Azerbaijan)	Namik Alaskarov	Bursaspor	14 August 2021	
29 December 2021	MF	(France)	Romain Basque	LB Châteauroux	1 January 2022	
21 January 2022	FW	(São Tomé and Príncipe)	Harramiz	Farense	26 January 2022	
22 January 2022	MF	(Argentina)	Jorge Correa	Volos	25 January 2022	
3 June 2022	DF	(Portugal)	Hugo Basto	AEL Limassol		
10 June 2022	GK	(Azerbaijan)	Kamran Ibrahimov	Kapaz		
27 June 2022	FW	(Brazil)	Ramon	Gabala	30 July 2022	
30 June 2022	GK	(Azerbaijan)	Rashad Azizli	Shamakhi		
30 June 2022	MF	(Azerbaijan)	Fahmin Muradbayli			
30 June 2022	GK	(Azerbaijan)	Emin Zamanov	Sabail		
30 June 2022	FW	(Azerbaijan)	Mirabdulla Abbasov	Sabail		
30 June 2022	FW	(Brazil)	Tiago Bezerra	Al-Orobah	7 July 2022	

== Friendlies ==
21 June 2021	Olimpija Ljubljana (Slovenia)	1 – 1	(Azerbaijan) Neftçi	Ljubljana, Slovenia
20:00 AZT (UTC+4)	Perović 2'	Report	Alaskarov 1'	Stadium: Kodeljevo Sports Park; Referee: Rade Obrenoviç

24 June 2021	Domžale (Slovenia)	2 – 1	(Azerbaijan) Neftçi	Domžale, Slovenia
20:15 AZT (UTC+4)	Markuš 33'; Repas 39'	Report	Alaskarov 24'	Stadium: Domžale Sports Park; Referee: Leon Paşaliç

29 June 2021	Spartak Moscow (Russia)	1 – 2	(Azerbaijan) Neftçi	Villach, Slovenia
19:30 AZT (UTC+4)	Ignatov 44'	Report	Alaskarov 9'; Harramiz 45+2'	Stadium: Sportzentrum Landskron; Referee: Manfred Krassnitzer

14 January 2022	Neftçi (Azerbaijan)	2 – 2	(Hungary) Kisvárda	Antalya, Turkey
17:00 AZT (UTC+4)	Mahmudov 42'; R.Nasirli 71'	Report	12'; 14'	Stadium: Emirhan Sports Complex

19 January 2022	Neftçi (Azerbaijan)	1 – 1	(Poland) Wisła Płock	Antalya, Turkey
AZT (UTC+4)	Lawal 55'	Report	Lagator 90'	Stadium: Emirhan Sports Complex

24 January 2022	Neftçi (Azerbaijan)	1 – 0	(Poland) Górnik Łęczna	Antalya, Turkey
AZT (UTC+4)	Mahmudov 54'	Report

== Competitions ==
=== Overview ===
Competition	First match	Last match	Starting round	Final position	Record							
Competition	First match	Last match	Starting round	Final position	Pld	W	D	L	GF	GA	GD	Win %
Premier League	15 August 2021	21 May 2022	Matchday 1	2nd	28	15	5	8	42	31	+11	53.57
Azerbaijan Cup	1 February 2022	29 April 2022	Quarterfinal	Semifinal	4	1	3	0	4	2	+2	25.00
UEFA Champions League	7 July 2021	28 July 2021	First Qualifying Round	Second Qualifying Round	4	2	0	2	4	3	+1	50.00
UEFA Europa League	3 August 2021	12 August 2021	Third Qualifying Round	Third Qualifying Round	2	0	1	1	2	5	−3	0.00
UEFA Europa Conference League	19 August 2021	26 August 2021	Playoff Round	Playoff Round	2	0	1	1	3	7	−4	0.00
Total					40	18	10	12	55	48	+7	45.00

Last updated: 21 May 2022
Source: Competitions

=== Premier League ===
==== League table ====
Pos	Team	Pld	W	D	L	GF	GA	GD	Pts	Qualification
1	Qarabağ (C)	28	21	6	1	72	13	+59	69	Qualification for the Champions League first qualifying round
2	Neftçi Baku	28	15	5	8	42	31	+11	50	Qualification to Europa Conference League second qualifying round
3	Zira	28	13	8	7	33	27	+6	47	Qualification to Europa Conference League second qualifying round
4	Gabala	28	12	9	7	38	34	+4	45	Qualification to Europa Conference League second qualifying round
5	Sabah	28	12	5	11	42	34	+8	41	

Source: Soccerway
Rules for classification: 1) Points; 2) Head-to-head points; 3) Head-to-head goal difference; 4) Head-to-head goals scored; 5) Head-to-head away goals scored (only if two teams); 6) Goal difference; 7) Goals scored.
(C) Champions

==== Results summary ====
Overall								Home						Away					
Pld	W	D	L	GF	GA	GD	Pts	W	D	L	GF	GA	GD	W	D	L	GF	GA	GD
28	15	5	8	42	31	+11	50	8	3	3	24	12	+12	7	2	5	18	19	−1

Last updated: 21 May 2022.
Source: See Results

==== Results by round ====
Round	1	2	3	4	5	6	7	8	9	10	11	12	13	14	15	16	17	18	19	20	21	22	23	24	25	26	27	28
Ground	H	A	H	A	A	A	A	H	A	A	H	H	A	A	H	H	A	H	H	H	H	A	H	A	A	A	A	A
Result	D	W	L	W	W	W	D	W	L	L	L	W	D	D	L	W	W	W	W	W	D	W	W	W	W	L	L	L
Position	3	3	5	3	3	2	2	2	2	3	4	4	4	3	4	4	4	4	3	2	2	2	2	2	2	2	2	2

Updated to match(es) played on 21 May 2022. Source: See Results
A = Away; H = Home; W = Win; D = Draw; L = Loss

==== Results ====
15 August 2021 1	Neftçi	2 – 2	Gabala	Baku
20:00 AZT (UTC+4)	Kané (yellow card) 40'; Muradbayli (yellow card) 45' (goal) 55'; Stanković 76'; Basque (yellow card) 90+2'	Report	Isayev (yellow card) 62'; Alimi 67' (pen.); Ahmadov (yellow card) 75'; Isgandarov 84'	Stadium: Eighth Kilometer District Stadium; Referee: Elcin Masiyev

22 August 2021 2	Zira	1 – 2	Neftçi	Zirə
18:30 AZT (UTC+4)	Tashkin (yellow card) 8'; Muradov (yellow card) 45+2'; Volkovi 90+4'	Report	Mbodj (yellow card) 16'; Abbasov (yellow card) 45+1'; Muradbayli 72'; Basto (yellow card) 83'; Kané (yellow card) 90+2'; Harramiz (yellow card) 90'; Mahmudov 90+3'	Stadium: Zira Olympic Sport Complex Stadium; Referee: Kamal Umudlu

12 September 2021 3	Neftçi	1 – 2	Qarabağ	Baku
20:30 AZT (UTC+4)	Çelik (yellow card) 36'; Mahmudov 47'; Zulfugarli (yellow card) 65'; Ramon (yellow card) 71'; Najafov (yellow card) 87'	Report	Wadji 21', 45'; Medina (yellow card) 56'; Garayev (yellow card) 78'	Stadium: Eighth Kilometer District Stadium; Referee: Rasad Ahmadov

19 September 2021 4	Neftçi	3 – 0	Keşla	Baku
18:30 AZT (UTC+4)	Meza 36'; Ramon 50'; Zulfugarli 68'	Report	Gigauri (yellow card) 17'; Valizade (yellow card) 21'; Neto (yellow card) 23'	Stadium: Eighth Kilometer District Stadium; Referee: Elcin Məsiyev

26 September 2021 5	Sabah	1 – 2	Neftçi	Masazır
17:00 AZT (UTC+4)	Isayev 81'; Seydiyev (yellow card) 90+5'	Report	Ramon 21'; Kané 77' (yellow card) 77'; Lawal (yellow card) 87'; Mammadov (yellow card) 90+2'	Stadium: Bank Respublika Arena; Referee: Aliyar Ağayev

2 October 2021 6	Sabail	1 – 3	Neftçi	Baku
19:15 AZT (UTC+4)	Naghiyev (yellow card) 41'; Amirli (yellow card) 66'; Rajsel 90+5'	Report	Lawal 26'; Çelik (yellow card) 38'; Bezerra 45+1', 78'	Stadium: Bayil Arena; Referee: Vugar Hasanli

17 October 2021 7	Sumgayit	1 – 1	Neftçi	Sumgait
16:30 AZT (UTC+4)	Abdullazade (yellow card) 42'; Khachayev 50'	Report	Basto (yellow card) 39'; Bougrine 54'; Buludov (yellow card) 68'; Najafov (yellow card) 75'	Stadium: Kapital Bank Arena; Referee: Elcin Məsiyev

23 October 2021 8	Neftçi	2 – 1	Zira	Baku
18:15 AZT (UTC+4)	Mbodj (yellow card) 12'; Meza 39'; Lawal (yellow card) 62'; Abbasov 84'; Najafov (yellow card) 90+4'	Report	Ramazanov 6'; Volkovi (yellow card) 60'; Hajili (yellow card) 77'	Stadium: Eighth Kilometer District Stadium; Referee: Ravan Hamzazada

30 October 2021 9	Qarabağ	4 – 0	Neftçi	Baku
18:30 AZT (UTC+4)	Ozobić 10', 23' (pen.); Zoubir 14'; Garayev (yellow card) 70'; Vešović 90+3'	Report	Bougrine (yellow card) 29'; Buludov (yellow card) 37'; Çelik (yellow card) 55'; Mbodj (yellow card) 57'; Bezerra (yellow card) 80'	Stadium: Azersun Arena; Referee: Aliyar Agayev

6 November 2021 10	Keşla	3 – 2	Neftçi	Baku
19:00 AZT (UTC+4)	Qirtimov (yellow card) 34'; Santos 41' (pen.); Hajiyev 49'; S.Aliyev (yellow card) 63'; Abang 86'; Tounkara (yellow card) 90+1'	Report	Bezerra 11', 35' (yellow card) 34'; K.Ibrahimov (yellow card) 40'	Stadium: ASK Arena; Referee: Rauf Jabarov

20 November 2021 11	Neftçi	1 – 2	Sabah	Baku
18:15 AZT (UTC+4)	Stanković (yellow card) 20'; Ramon 33'; Najafov (yellow card) 54'; Lawal (yellow card) 90+4'	Report	Mickels 53', 69'; Nuriyev (yellow card) 72'; M.Ergemlidze (yellow card) 90+3'	Stadium: Eighth Kilometer District Stadium; Referee: Ravan Hamzazada

27 November 2021 12	Neftçi	1 – 0	Sabail	Baku
18:15 AZT (UTC+4)	V.Asgarov 52'; Çelik (yellow card) 90'	Report	Rahimli (yellow card) 47'	Stadium: Eighth Kilometer District Stadium; Referee: Elcin Masiyev

5 December 2021 13	Neftçi	0 – 0	Sumgayit	Baku
16:00 AZT (UTC+4)	Mahmudov (yellow card) 85'	Report	Mutallimov (yellow card) 33'	Stadium: Eighth Kilometer District Stadium; Referee: Vugar Hasanli

15 December 2021 14	Gabala	1 – 1	Neftçi	Qabala
16:00 AZT (UTC+4)	Musayev (yellow card) 11'; Utzig 28'; Ruan (yellow card) 53' (yellow-red card) 89'; E.Səfərov (yellow card) 76'	Report	Çelik (yellow card) 19'; Mahmudov 39' (yellow card) 65'; Meza (yellow card) 55'; Basque (yellow card) 86'	Stadium: Gabala City Stadium; Referee: Kamal Umudlu

7 February 2022 15	Neftçi	1 – 2	Qarabağ	Baku
19:00 AZT (UTC+4)	Pato (yellow card) 5'; Çelik (yellow card) 50' (goal) 81'; Mahmudov (yellow card) 90+6'	Report	Kady 25', 62' (yellow card) 64'; Richard (yellow card) 45'; Medina (yellow card) 55'	Stadium: Eighth Kilometer District Stadium; Referee: Kamal Umudlu

19 February 2022 16	Neftçi	3 – 1	Keşla	Baku
17:15 AZT (UTC+4)	Meza 21'; Stanković 26'; R.Nəsirli 44'; A.Aliyev (yellow card) 60'; Israfilov (yellow card) 65'	Report	S.Aliyev (yellow card) 25'; Akhundov (yellow card) 55'; Q.Səfərov (yellow card) 63'; Santos 90+3'	Stadium: Eighth Kilometer District Stadium; Referee: Farid Haciyev

27 February 2022 17	Sabah	0 – 1	Neftçi	Masazır
16:00 AZT (UTC+4)	Letić (yellow card) 90'; Mickels (yellow card) 90'; Hasanalizade (yellow card) 90+5'	Report	Meza 50'; Israfilov (yellow card) 56'; Lawal (yellow card) 66'; Brkić (yellow card) 72'; Çelik (yellow card) 90+2'	Stadium: Bank Respublika Arena; Referee: Rauf Jabarov

5 March 2022 18	Neftçi	2 – 0	Sabail	Baku
19:15 AZT (UTC+4)	Bezerra 73'; Salahlı 79'	Report	Mirzabeyov (yellow card) 14'; Bayramli (yellow card) 60'; Goxha (yellow card) 86'; Naghiyev (yellow card) 87'	Stadium: Eighth Kilometer District Stadium; Referee: Kamal Umudlu

13 March 2022 19	Neftçi	2 – 1	Sumgayit	Baku
18:15 AZT (UTC+4)	Mahmudov 17', 82' (pen.); Lawal (yellow card) 26'; Çelik (yellow card) 53'; Ramon (yellow card) 83'	Report	Sadikhov 24'; Haghverdi (yellow card) 29'; Khodzhaniyazov (yellow card) 65'; Mustafayev (yellow card) 78'	Stadium: Eighth Kilometer District Stadium; Referee: Raad Ahmadov

18 March 2022 20	Neftçi	4 – 0	Gabala	Baku
19:37 AZT (UTC+4)	Israfilov 6', 90+5' (yellow card) 47'; Mbodj 17'; Stanković (yellow card) 69'; Pato 82'	Report	Vukčević (yellow card) 46'; Alimi (yellow card) 69'	Stadium: Eighth Kilometer District Stadium; Referee: Elcin Masiyev

3 April 2022 21	Neftçi	1 – 1	Zira	Baku
17:15 AZT (UTC+4)	Israfilov (yellow card) 18' (yellow-red card) 77'; Aliyev (yellow card) 73'; Bezerra 90+5' (pen.)	Report	Brogno (yellow card) 20'; Isaiah (yellow card) 38' (goal) 89'; Diniyev (yellow card) 45' (yellow-red card) 61'; Khalilzade (yellow card) 73'; Nazirov (yellow card) 73'; Taşqın (yellow card) 90'; Ramazanov (yellow card) 90' (yellow-red card) 90'; Jannatov (yellow card) 90+3'	Stadium: Eighth Kilometer District Stadium; Referee: Ingilab Məmmədov

9 April 2022 22	Shamakhi	1 – 2	Neftçi	Shamakhi
14:00 AZT (UTC+4)	Hajiyev 10'; Flores (yellow card) 16'; Aldair (yellow card) 45+4'; Amirjanov (yellow card) 90+3'	Report	Pato (yellow card) 45+4'; Yusifli (yellow card) 52'; Bezerra 60'; Ramon 72'	Stadium: Şamaxı Sahar Stadium; Referee: Elcin Məsiyev
Note: On 6 April, Keşla changed their name to Shamakhi.

16 April 2022 23	Neftçi	1 – 0	Sabah	Baku
20:30 AZT (UTC+4)	Hasanalizade 5' (o.g.); Lawal (yellow card) 47'; Aliyev (yellow card) 77'; Bezerra (yellow card) 88'	Report	Ochihava (yellow card) 24'; A.Xaybulayev (yellow card) 34'; Rangel (yellow card) 47'	Stadium: Eighth Kilometer District Stadium; Referee: Kamal Umudlu

24 April 2022 24	Sabail	0 – 1	Neftçi	Bayil
20:00 AZT (UTC+4)	Naghiyev (yellow card) 65'; Bayramli (yellow card) 80'	Report	Buludov (yellow card) 37' (yellow-red card) 47'; Bezerra 71'; K.Ibrahimov (yellow card) 89'; Mbodj (yellow card) 90+1'	Stadium: Bayil Arena; Referee: Ravan Hamzazada

4 May 2022 25	Sumgayit	0 – 2	Neftçi	Sumgait
20:00 AZT (UTC+4)	Khodzhaniyazov (red card) 19'	Report	Bezerra 12', 61'; Stanković (yellow card) 39'; Zulfugarli (yellow card) 45'; Israfilov (yellow card) 67'; R.Abbasov (yellow card) 71'; Yusifli (yellow card) 81'	Stadium: Kapital Bank Arena; Referee: Kamal Umudlu

9 May 2022 26	Gabala	1 – 0	Neftçi	Qabala
19:45 AZT (UTC+4)	Mammadov (yellow card) 30'; Alimi 74' (pen.); Mirzayev (yellow card) 75'; Musayev (yellow card) 90+2'	Report	Bezerra (yellow card) 73'	Stadium: Gabala City Stadium; Referee: Farid Haciyev

15 May 2022 27	Zira	1 – 0	Neftçi	Zirə
17:00 AZT (UTC+4)	Khalilzade (yellow card) 22'; Hajili (yellow card) 23'; R.Ahmadov 82'; Nazirov (yellow card) 90+6'	Report	Salahlı (yellow card) 12'; Lawal (yellow card) 21'; Mbodj (yellow card) 29'; Mahmudov (yellow card) 34'; Aliyev (yellow card) 35'; Ramon (yellow card) 36'; Buludov (yellow card) 74'; Israfilov (yellow card) 76'	Stadium: Zira Olympic Sport Complex Stadium; Referee: Rauf Jabarov

21 May 2022 28	Qarabağ	4 – 1	Neftçi	Baku
19:30 AZT (UTC+4)	P.Andrade 6'; Kady 10'; Yusifli 14' (o.g.); Vešović (yellow card) 36'; Brkić 57' (o.g.); Garayev (yellow card) 85'	Report	Stanković (yellow card) 18'; Israfilov (yellow card) 36'; V.Asgarov (yellow card) 39'; Zulfugarli (yellow card) 60'; Ramon 71'; Mbodj (yellow card) 85'	Stadium: Azersun Arena; Referee: Farid Haciyev

=== Azerbaijan Cup ===
1 February 2022 Quarterfinal 1st leg	Neftçi	1 – 1	Sabah	Baku
19:45 AZT (UTC+4)	Stanković 41'; Ramon (yellow card) 70'; Israfilov (yellow card) 74'; Mahmudov (yellow card) 86'	Report	Rodríguez (yellow card) 29'; Mickels 50' (yellow card) 54'; Ochihava (yellow card) 70'	Stadium: Eighth Kilometer District Stadium; Referee: Aliyar Agayev

12 February 2022 Quarterfinal 2nd leg	Sabah	1 – 3 (2 – 4 agg.)	Neftçi	Masazır
16:00 AZT (UTC+4)	Nuriyev (yellow card) 34'; Cámara 42'; Rodríguez (yellow card) 70'; Isayev (red card) 75'; Aghayev (red card) 75'; Mickels (yellow card) 76'; M.Ergemlidze (yellow card) 76'; Ochihava (yellow card) 90+9'	Report	Najafov (yellow card) 22'; Mahmudov 61'; Ramon 62', 68'; Israfilov (yellow card) 74'	Stadium: Bank Respublika Arena; Referee: Ravan Hamzazada

20 April 2022 Semifinal 1st leg	Zira	0 – 0	Neftçi	Zirə
20:00 AZT (UTC+4)		Report	Meza (yellow card) 82'	Stadium: Zira Olympic Sport Complex Stadium; Referee: Rauf Jabarov

28 April 2022 Semifinal 2nd leg	Neftçi	0 – 0 (0 – 0 agg.) (2 – 4 p)	Zira	Baku
20:30 AZT (UTC+4)	Yusifli (yellow card) 49'	Report	Chantakias (yellow card) 28'; Khalilzade (yellow card) 61'	Stadium: Eighth Kilometer District Stadium; Referee: Aliyar Agayev
	Penalties
	Mahmudov (penalty scored); Bezerra (penalty scored); Israfilov (penalty missed); Pato (penalty missed)		Keyta (penalty scored); Khalilzade (penalty scored); Aliyev (penalty scored); Volkovi (penalty scored)

=== UEFA Champions League ===
==== Qualifying rounds ====
7 July 2021 First Qualifying Round 1st leg	Dinamo Tbilisi (Georgia (country))	1 – 2	(Azerbaijan) Neftçi	Tbilisi, Georgia
20:00 AZT (UTC+4)	Marušić 36'; B.Kardava (yellow card) 84'	Report	Alaskarov 23'; Mahmudov 57' (pen.); Lawal (yellow card) 77'	Stadium: Boris Paichadze Dinamo Arena; Attendance: 5,890; Referee: David Fuxman (Israel)

14 July 2021 First Qualifying Round 2nd leg	Neftçi (Azerbaijan)	2 – 1 (4 – 2 agg.)	(Georgia (country)) Dinamo Tbilisi	Baku, Azerbaijan
21:00 AZT (UTC+4)	Meza (yellow card) 22'; Mbodj (yellow card) 55'; Mahmudov 58' (pen.); Lawal (yellow card) 64'; Alaskarov 68'; Buludov (yellow card) 81'	Report	Radin (yellow card) 45+1' (goal) 51'; Gabedava (yellow card) 52'; G.Kutsia (yellow card) 65'; Gbegnon (yellow card) 71'; T.Morchiladze (yellow card) 83'; N.Iashvili (yellow card) 90+1'	Stadium: Eighth Kilometer District Stadium; Attendance: 3,218; Referee: Dumitri Muntean (Moldova)

21 July 2021 Second Qualifying Round 1st leg	Olympiakos (Greece)	1 – 0	(Azerbaijan) Neftçi	Piraeus, Greece
23:00 AZT (UTC+4)	Bouchalakis (yellow card) 8'; Camara 29' (red card) 43'; Marković (yellow card) 72'; Sourlis (yellow card) 90+4'	Report	Alaskarov (yellow card) 22'; Mahmudov (yellow card) 53'; Çelik (red card) 63'	Stadium: Karaiskakis Stadium; Attendance: 7,305; Referee: João Pinheiro (Portugal)

28 July 2021 Second Qualifying Round 2nd leg	Neftçi (Azerbaijan)	0 – 1 (0 – 1 agg.)	(Greece) Olympiakos	Baku, Azerbaijan
21:00 (UTC+4)		Report	Masouras 15'	Stadium: Eighth Kilometer District Stadium; Attendance: 5,500; Referee: Ricardo de Burgos (Spain)

=== UEFA Europa League ===
==== Qualifying rounds ====
3 August 2021 Third qualifying round 1st leg	Neftçi (Azerbaijan)	2 – 2	(Finland) HJK	Baku, Azerbaijan
19:00 (UTC+4)	Najafov (yellow card) 20'; Bougrine 59'; Harramiz (yellow card) 63'; Mahmudov 80'; Muradbayli (yellow card) 84'	Report	Murillo (yellow card) 49'; Ro.Riski 61'; Jair 65'; Peltola (yellow card) 80'; Tenho (yellow card) 83'; Ri.Riski (yellow card) 90+1'	Stadium: Eighth Kilometer District Stadium; Attendance: 3,500; Referee: William Collum (Scotland)

12 August 2021 Third qualifying round 2nd leg	HJK (Finland)	3 – 0 (5 – 2 agg.)	(Azerbaijan) Neftçi	Helsinki, Finland
20:00 (UTC+4)	Ri. Riski 46' (yellow card) 79'; Ro. Riski 60' (pen.), 89'; O'Shaughnessy (yellow card) 84'	Report	Mbodj (yellow card) 60'; Harramiz (yellow card) 66'; Najafov (yellow card) 83'	Stadium: Bolt Arena; Attendance: 4,068; Referee: Deniz Aytekin (Germany)

=== UEFA Europa Conference League ===
==== Qualifying rounds ====
19 August 2021 Playoff round 1st leg	Neftçi (Azerbaijan)	3 – 3	(Israel) Maccabi Haïfa	Baku, Azerbaijan
21:00 (UTC+4)	Mbodj (yellow card) 28'; Zulfugarli (yellow card) 43' (yellow-red card) 77'; Lawal 50', 66' (yellow card) 53'; Mahmudov (yellow card) 58' (goal) 72'	Report	Mohamed (yellow card) 7'; Atzili 9'; Atzili (yellow card) 28'; Abu Fani (yellow card) 49'; Chery 78', 90+6'; Strain (yellow card) 90+8'	Stadium: Eighth Kilometer District Stadium; Attendance: 3,400; Referee: Willy Delajod (France)

26 August 2021 Playoff round 2nd leg	Maccabi Haïfa (Israel)	4 – 0 (7 – 3 agg.)	(Azerbaijan) Neftçi	Haifa, Israel
21:00 (UTC+4)	Strain (yellow card) 8'; Menahem 20'; Dahan (yellow card) 28'; Atzili 45+2'; Haziza (yellow card) 45+4' (goal) 52' (pen.); Abu Fani 69'	Report	Çelik (yellow card) 45+4'; Mahmudov (yellow card) 52'; Kané (yellow card) 53'	Stadium: Sammy Ofer Stadium; Referee: Aleksandar Stavrev (North Macedonia)

== Squad statistics ==
As of match played 21 May 2022

=== Appearances and goals ===
No.	Pos	Nat	Player	Total		Premier League		Azerbaijan Cup		UEFA Champions League		UEFA Europa League		UEFA Europa Conference League	
No.	Pos	Nat	Player	Apps	Goals	Apps	Goals	Apps	Goals	Apps	Goals	Apps	Goals	Apps	Goals
1	GK	(Croatia) CRO	Ivan Brkić	15	0	11	0	4	0	0	0	0	0	0	0
3	DF	(Senegal) SEN	Mamadou Mbodj	26	1	16	1	3	0	4	0	2	0	1	0
4	DF	(Portugal) POR	Hugo Basto	11	0	8	0	1	0	0	0	0	0	1+1	0
6	DF	(Serbia) SRB	Vojislav Stanković	36	3	25	2	3	1	4	0	2	0	2	0
7	MF	(Russia) RUS	Azer Aliyev	14	0	7+4	0	1+2	0	0	0	0	0	0	0
8	MF	(Azerbaijan) AZE	Emin Mahmudov	39	10	26+1	5	4	1	4	2	2	1	2	1
9	FW	(Brazil) BRA	Tiago Bezerra	25	10	15+6	10	1+3	0	0	0	0	0	0	0
10	MF	(Paraguay) PAR	César Meza	35	4	17+7	4	1+2	0	4	0	2	0	1+1	0
12	GK	(Azerbaijan) AZE	Kamran Ibrahimov	10	0	9	0	0	0	0	0	0+1	0	0	0
14	MF	(Azerbaijan) AZE	Eddy Israfilov	16	2	13	2	3	0	0	0	0	0	0	0
19	DF	(Azerbaijan) AZE	Azer Salahlı	17	1	13	1	4	0	0	0	0	0	0	0
20	DF	(Azerbaijan) AZE	Mert Çelik	26	1	17+1	1	2	0	3	0	0+1	0	2	0
21	MF	(Azerbaijan) AZE	Ismayil Zulfugarli	22	1	9+8	1	2+1	0	0+1	0	0	0	1	0
22	FW	(Azerbaijan) AZE	Mirabdulla Abbasov	16	1	3+7	1	0	0	0+4	0	1+1	0	0	0
24	MF	(Nigeria) NGR	Yusuf Lawal	38	3	24+3	1	4	0	4	0	2	0	1	2
26	DF	(Azerbaijan) AZE	Omar Buludov	23	0	16+2	0	1	0	2+2	0	0	0	0	0
27	MF	(Azerbaijan) AZE	Farid Yusifli	10	0	7+1	0	2	0	0	0	0	0	0	0
30	GK	(Azerbaijan) AZE	Agil Mammadov	16	0	8	0	0	0	4	0	2	0	2	0
37	MF	(Azerbaijan) AZE	Vusal Asgarov	11	1	7+2	1	1	0	0	0	0	0	0+1	0
70	MF	(Azerbaijan) AZE	Asim Alizada	2	0	0	0	0	0	0+1	0	0	0	0+1	0
73	MF	(Azerbaijan) AZE	Ramin Nəsirli	4	1	1+3	1	0	0	0	0	0	0	0	0
77	FW	(Brazil) BRA	Guilherme Pato	15	1	5+6	1	3+1	0	0	0	0	0	0	0
82	DF	(Azerbaijan) AZE	Rüfat Abbasov	1	0	1	0	0	0	0	0	0	0	0	0
91	FW	(Brazil) BRA	Ramon	28	7	9+15	5	3+1	2	0	0	0	0	0	0
97	MF	(Azerbaijan) AZE	Khayal Najafov	26	0	10+7	0	1+1	0	0+4	0	1+1	0	0+1	0
98	FW	(Azerbaijan) AZE	Famil Camalov	1	0	1	0	0	0	0	0	0	0	0	0
Players away on loan:
19	MF	(Azerbaijan) AZE	Fahmin Muradbayli	9	2	3+1	2	0	0	0+1	0	0+2	0	1+1	0
Players who left Neftçi during the season:
7	MF	(Azerbaijan) AZE	Namik Alaskarov	3	2	0	0	0	0	3	2	0	0	0	0
7	MF	(Argentina) ARG	Jorge Correa	2	0	1+1	0	0	0	0	0	0	0	0	0
11	FW	(São Tomé and Príncipe) STP	Harramiz	11	0	1+2	0	0	0	3+1	0	2	0	2	0
14	MF	(France) FRA	Romain Basque	12	0	6	0	0	0	1+1	0	2	0	2	0
29	MF	(Morocco) MAR	Sabir Bougrine	20	2	9+3	1	0	0	4	0	2	1	2	0
36	MF	(Guinea) GUI	Mamadou Kané	19	1	11	1	0	0	4	0	2	0	2	0

=== Goal scorers ===
Place	Position	Nation	Number	Name	Premier League	Azerbaijan Cup	UEFA Champions League	UEFA Europa League	UEFA Europa Conference League	Total
1	FW	(Brazil)	9	Tiago Bezerra	10	0	0	0	0	10
1	MF	(Azerbaijan)	8	Emin Mahmudov	5	1	2	1	1	10
3	FW	(Brazil)	91	Ramon	5	2	0	0	0	7
4	MF	(Paraguay)	10	César Meza	4	0	0	0	0	4
5	DF	(Serbia)	6	Vojislav Stanković	2	1	0	0	0	3
5	MF	(Nigeria)	24	Yusuf Lawal	1	0	0	0	2	3
7	MF	(Azerbaijan)	19	Fahmin Muradbayli	2	0	0	0	0	2
7	MF	(Azerbaijan)	14	Eddy Israfilov	2	0	0	0	0	2
7	MF	(Morocco)	29	Sabir Bougrine	1	0	0	1	0	2
7	MF	(Azerbaijan)	7	Namik Alaskarov	0	0	2	0	0	2
11	MF	(Azerbaijan)	21	Ismayil Zulfugarli	1	0	0	0	0	1
11	FW	(Azerbaijan)	22	Mirabdulla Abbasov	1	0	0	0	0	1
11	MF	(Guinea)	36	Mamadou Kané	1	0	0	0	0	1
11	MF	(Azerbaijan)	37	Vusal Asgarov	1	0	0	0	0	1
11	DF	(Azerbaijan)	20	Mert Çelik	1	0	0	0	0	1
11	MF	(Azerbaijan)	73	Ramin Nəsirli	1	0	0	0	0	1
11	DF	(Azerbaijan)	19	Azer Salahlı	1	0	0	0	0	1
11	DF	(Senegal)	3	Mamadou Mbodj	1	0	0	0	0	1
11	FW	(Brazil)	77	Guilherme Pato	1	0	0	0	0	1
11				Own goal	1	0	0	0	0	1
				TOTALS	42	4	4	2	3	55

=== Clean sheets ===
Place	Position	Nation	Number	Name	Premier League	Azerbaijan Cup	UEFA Champions League	UEFA Europa League	UEFA Europa Conference League	Total
1	GK	(Croatia)	1	Ivan Brkić	5	2	0	0	0	7
2	GK	(Azerbaijan)	12	Kamran Ibrahimov	3	0	0	0	0	3
3	GK	(Azerbaijan)	30	Agil Mammadov	1	0	0	0	0	1
				TOTALS	9	2	0	0	0	11

=== Disciplinary record ===
Number	Nation	Position	Name	Premier League		Azerbaijan Cup		UEFA Champions League		UEFA Europa League		UEFA Europa Conference League		Total	
Number	Nation	Position	Name	Yellow card	Red card	Yellow card	Red card	Yellow card	Red card	Yellow card	Red card	Yellow card	Red card	Yellow card	Red card
1	(Croatia)	GK	Ivan Brkić	1	0	0	0	0	0	0	0	0	0	1	0
3	(Senegal)	DF	Mamadou Mbodj	6	0	0	0	1	0	1	0	1	0	9	0
4	(Portugal)	DF	Hugo Basto	2	0	0	0	0	0	0	0	0	0	2	0
6	(Serbia)	DF	Vojislav Stanković	4	0	0	0	0	0	0	0	0	0	4	0
7	(Russia)	MF	Azer Aliyev	4	0	0	0	0	0	0	0	0	0	4	0
8	(Azerbaijan)	MF	Emin Mahmudov	4	0	1	0	1	0	0	0	2	0	8	0
9	(Brazil)	FW	Tiago Bezerra	4	0	0	0	0	0	0	0	0	0	4	0
10	(Paraguay)	MF	César Meza	1	0	1	0	1	0	0	0	0	0	3	0
12	(Azerbaijan)	GK	Kamran Ibrahimov	2	0	0	0	0	0	0	0	0	0	2	0
14	(Azerbaijan)	MF	Eddy Israfilov	8	1	2	0	0	0	0	0	0	0	10	1
19	(Azerbaijan)	DF	Azer Salahlı	1	0	0	0	0	0	0	0	0	0	1	0
20	(Azerbaijan)	DF	Mert Çelik	8	0	0	0	0	1	0	0	1	0	9	1
21	(Azerbaijan)	MF	Ismayil Zulfugarli	3	0	0	0	0	0	0	0	2	1	5	1
22	(Azerbaijan)	FW	Mirabdulla Abbasov	1	0	0	0	0	0	0	0	0	0	1	0
24	(Nigeria)	MF	Yusuf Lawal	6	0	0	0	1	0	0	0	1	0	9	0
26	(Azerbaijan)	DF	Omar Buludov	5	1	0	0	1	0	0	0	0	0	6	1
27	(Azerbaijan)	MF	Farid Yusifli	2	0	1	0	0	0	0	0	0	0	3	0
30	(Azerbaijan)	GK	Agil Mammadov	1	0	0	0	0	0	0	0	0	0	1	0
37	(Azerbaijan)	MF	Vusal Asgarov	1	0	0	0	0	0	0	0	0	0	1	0
77	(Brazil)	FW	Guilherme Pato	2	0	0	0	0	0	0	0	0	0	2	0
82	(Azerbaijan)	DF	Rüfat Abbasov	1	0	0	0	0	0	0	0	0	0	1	0
91	(Brazil)	FW	Ramon	3	0	1	0	0	0	0	0	0	0	4	0
97	(Azerbaijan)	MF	Khayal Najafov	4	0	1	0	0	0	2	0	0	0	7	0
Players away on loan:
19	(Azerbaijan)	MF	Fahmin Muradbayli	1	0	0	0	0	0	1	0	0	0	2	0
Players who left Neftçi during the season:
7	(Azerbaijan)	MF	Namik Alaskarov	0	0	0	0	1	0	0	0	0	0	1	0
11	(São Tomé and Príncipe)	FW	Harramiz	1	0	0	0	0	0	2	0	0	0	3	0
14	(France)	MF	Romain Basque	2	0	0	0	0	0	0	0	0	0	2	0
29	(Belgium)	MF	Sabir Bougrine	1	0	0	0	0	0	0	0	0	0	1	0
36	(Guinea)	MF	Mamadou Kané	3	0	0	0	0	0	0	0	1	0	4	0
			TOTALS	83	2	7	0	7	1	6	0	8	1	111	4
