= List of Azerbaijan football transfers winter 2021–22 =

This is a list of Azerbaijan football transfers in the winter transfer window, by club. Only clubs of the 2021–22 Azerbaijan Premier League are included.

== Azerbaijan Premier League 2021-22 ==
=== Gabala ===
In: Note: Flags indicate national team as defined under FIFA eligibility rules; some limited exceptions apply. Players may hold more than one non-FIFA nationality.

No.	Pos.	Nation	Player
2	DF	AZE	Samet Karakoc (from (Turkey) Bayrampaşa)
24	FW	BRA	Patrick (loan from (Austria) Admira Wacker)

Out: Note: Flags indicate national team as defined under FIFA eligibility rules; some limited exceptions apply. Players may hold more than one non-FIFA nationality.

No.	Pos.	Nation	Player

=== Keşla ===
In: Note: Flags indicate national team as defined under FIFA eligibility rules; some limited exceptions apply. Players may hold more than one non-FIFA nationality.

No.	Pos.	Nation	Player
6	DF	ARG	Franco Flores (from (Honduras) Real España)
9	MF	NGA	Nathan Oduwa
19	MF	AZE	Fahmin Muradbayli (loan from (Azerbaijan) Neftçi)

Out: Note: Flags indicate national team as defined under FIFA eligibility rules; some limited exceptions apply. Players may hold more than one non-FIFA nationality.

No.	Pos.	Nation	Player
9	FW	CMR	Anatole Abang (to (United Arab Emirates) Al Bataeh)
17	MF	SEN	Oumar Goudiaby
19	DF	AZE	Azer Salahli (to (Azerbaijan) Neftçi)
21	DF	MNE	Mijuško Bojović (to (Serbia) Inđija)
23	FW	AZE	Nijat Gurbanov
25	MF	SLE	John Kamara

=== Neftçi ===
In: Note: Flags indicate national team as defined under FIFA eligibility rules; some limited exceptions apply. Players may hold more than one non-FIFA nationality.

No.	Pos.	Nation	Player
1	GK	CRO	Ivan Brkić (from (Latvia) Riga)
7	MF	RUS	Azer Aliyev (from (Russia) Ufa)
14	MF	AZE	Eddy Israfilov
19	DF	AZE	Azer Salahli (from (Azerbaijan) Keşla)
77	FW	BRA	Guilherme Pato (from (Brazil) Internacional)
—	DF	AZE	Elton Alibeyli (loan return to (Azerbaijan) Neftçi)

Out: Note: Flags indicate national team as defined under FIFA eligibility rules; some limited exceptions apply. Players may hold more than one non-FIFA nationality.

No.	Pos.	Nation	Player
7	MF	ARG	Jorge Correa (to (Greece) Volos)
11	FW	STP	Harramiz (to (Portugal) Farense)
14	MF	FRA	Romain Basque (to (France) LB Châteauroux)
19	MF	AZE	Fahmin Muradbayli (loan to (Azerbaijan) Keşla)
29	MF	MAR	Sabir Bougrine (to (Tunisia) Espérance Sportive de Tunis)
36	MF	GUI	Mamadou Kané (loan return to (Greece) Olympiacos)

=== Qarabağ ===
In: Note: Flags indicate national team as defined under FIFA eligibility rules; some limited exceptions apply. Players may hold more than one non-FIFA nationality.

No.	Pos.	Nation	Player
15	MF	POR	Leandro Andrade (from (Bulgaria) Cherno More)
23	GK	GEO	Luka Gugeshashvili (on loan from (Poland) Jagiellonia Białystok)
97	FW	AZE	Rustam Akhmedzade (from (Ukraine) Mynai)
—	DF	AZE	Rauf Huseynli (loan return from (Azerbaijan) Zira)

Out: Note: Flags indicate national team as defined under FIFA eligibility rules; some limited exceptions apply. Players may hold more than one non-FIFA nationality.

No.	Pos.	Nation	Player
4	DF	AZE	Rahil Mammadov (loan to (Azerbaijan) Zira)
17	MF	ESP	Gaspar Panadero (loan to (Cyprus) AEK Larnaca)

=== Sabah ===
In: Note: Flags indicate national team as defined under FIFA eligibility rules; some limited exceptions apply. Players may hold more than one non-FIFA nationality.

No.	Pos.	Nation	Player
7	DF	BIH	Bojan Letić
15	MF	BRA	Christian (from (Portugal) Académica de Coimbra)
18	MF	UKR	Oleksiy Kashchuk (loan from (Ukraine) Shakhtar Donetsk)
73	FW	BRA	Lucas Rangel (loan from (Ukraine) Vorskla Poltava)
97	GK	BLR	Alyaksandr Nyachayew (from (Belarus) Rukh Brest)
99	DF	BRA	Higor Gabriel

Out: Note: Flags indicate national team as defined under FIFA eligibility rules; some limited exceptions apply. Players may hold more than one non-FIFA nationality.

No.	Pos.	Nation	Player
5	DF	AZE	Arsen Agjabayov (on loan to (Azerbaijan) Sumgayit)
7	FW	SRB	Petar Škuletić
16	GK	SRB	Saša Stamenković

=== Sabail ===
In: Note: Flags indicate national team as defined under FIFA eligibility rules; some limited exceptions apply. Players may hold more than one non-FIFA nationality.

No.	Pos.	Nation	Player
1	GK	AZE	Rashad Azizli (loan from (Azerbaijan) Zira)
—	GK	AZE	Huseynali Guliyev (from (Azerbaijan) Sumgayit)
—	MF	AZE	Tural Bayramli (from (Greece) Pierikos)

Out: Note: Flags indicate national team as defined under FIFA eligibility rules; some limited exceptions apply. Players may hold more than one non-FIFA nationality.

No.	Pos.	Nation	Player
1	GK	AZE	Kamran Agayev (Retired)
2	DF	AZE	Elton Alibeyli (loan return to (Azerbaijan) Neftçi)
3	DF	AZE	Turan Manafov (loan to (Greece) Olympiacos Volos)
8	MF	AZE	Elshan Abdullayev (to (Azerbaijan) Sumgayit)
31	GK	AZE	Nail Alışov

=== Sumgayit ===
In: Note: Flags indicate national team as defined under FIFA eligibility rules; some limited exceptions apply. Players may hold more than one non-FIFA nationality.

No.	Pos.	Nation	Player
15	MF	AZE	Vugar Beybalayev (from (Georgia (country)) Telavi)
24	MF	AZE	Elshan Abdullayev (from (Azerbaijan) Sabail)
78	MF	AZE	Araz Abdullayev (from (Cyprus) Ethnikos Achna)
—	DF	AZE	Arsen Agjabayov (on loan from (Azerbaijan) Sabah)

Out: Note: Flags indicate national team as defined under FIFA eligibility rules; some limited exceptions apply. Players may hold more than one non-FIFA nationality.

No.	Pos.	Nation	Player
20	MF	AZE	Roman Huseynov (to (Azerbaijan) Kapaz)
23	FW	IRN	Saeid Bagherpasand
71	GK	AZE	Huseynali Guliyev (to (Azerbaijan) Sabail)

=== Zira ===
In: Note: Flags indicate national team as defined under FIFA eligibility rules; some limited exceptions apply. Players may hold more than one non-FIFA nationality.

No.	Pos.	Nation	Player
5	DF	AZE	Rahil Mammadov (on loan from (Azerbaijan) Qarabağ)
14	MF	FRA	Hamidou Keyta (from (Portugal) Santa Clara)
92	MF	HAI	Bryan Alceus (from (Romania) Gaz Metan Mediaș)
99	MF	NGA	Ahmed Isaiah (from (Portugal) Sporting da Covilhã)

Out: Note: Flags indicate national team as defined under FIFA eligibility rules; some limited exceptions apply. Players may hold more than one non-FIFA nationality.

No.	Pos.	Nation	Player
5	DF	AZE	Rauf Huseynli (loan return to (Azerbaijan) Qarabağ)
11	FW	BRA	Welves (loan return to (Ukraine) Lviv)
22	GK	AZE	Rashad Azizli (loan to (Azerbaijan) Sabail)
88	MF	MKD	Gjorgi Stoilov (to (North Macedonia) Shkupi)
