= 2020–21 Neftçi PFK season =

Neftchi Baku
2020–21 season
- Manager: Fizuli Mammedov (until November 11, 2020); Samir Abbasov (from November 11, 2020)
- Stadium: Eighth Kilometer District Stadium
- Premier League: 1st
- Azerbaijan Cup: Quarterfinal vs Zira
- Europa League: Second qualifying Round vs Galatasaray
- Top goalscorer: League: Namik Alaskarov (19); All: Namik Alaskarov (19)
Home colours	Away colours	Third colours

The Neftçi 2020–21 season was Neftchi Baku's 29th Azerbaijan Premier League season. Neftchi will compete in the Azerbaijan Premier League and in the Azerbaijan Cup and Europa League.

== Season overview ==
On 20 June, Jabir Amirli joined Neftçi from Keşla on a two-year contract.

On 8 July, Neftçi signed a new contract with Rahman Hajiyev until the summer of 2022, whilst also loaning him out to Keşla for the 2020–21 season.

On 10 July, Neftçi signed a new two-year contract with Agil Mammadov.

On 16 July, Neftçi announced the signing of Yusuf Lawal from Lokeren on a two-year contract, with the option of a third. Two days later, 18 July Sabir Bougrine joined Neftçi from F91 Dudelange on a two-year contract.

On 21 July, Turan Valizade moved on loan to Keşla for the season. The following day Rener Pavão joined Neftçi from Fortaleza on a two-year contract with the option of an additional year.

On 24 July, Neftçi announced the signing of Thallyson to a two-year contract.

On 28 July, Neftçi extended their contract with Namik Alaskarov for an additional year.

On 11 September, Neftçi announced the signing of Prince Ibara on a one-year loan deal from Beerschot.

On 19 September, Neftçi announced the signing of Mert Çelik on two-year long loan deal from İstanbul Başakşehir.

On 15 October, Neftçi signed Bruno Telushi from Kukësi on a contract until the end of the season.

On 26 December, Neftçi announced that Prince Ibara's loan from Beerschot had ended by mutual agreement.

On 4 January, Jabir Amirli joined Sumgayit on loan for the remainder of the season.

On 9 February, Neftçi announced the signing of Ahmed Ahmedov on loan from CSKA Sofia.

On 14 March, Neftçi announced that they had terminated the contract of Saman Nariman Jahan by mutual consent. The following day, Neftçi announced the signing of Keisuke Honda on a contract until the end of the season.

== Squad ==
As of match played 19 May 2021

No.	Name	Nationality	Position	Date of birth (age)	Signed from	Signed in	Contract ends	Apps.	Goals
Goalkeepers
1	Salahat Aghayev	(Azerbaijan)	GK	4 January 1991 (aged 30)	Inter Baku	2017	2021	70	0
12	Kamran Ibrahimov	(Azerbaijan)	GK	7 June 1999 (aged 21)	Academy	2015	2022	0	0
30	Agil Mammadov	(Azerbaijan)	GK	1 May 1989 (aged 32)	Gabala	2019	2022	86	0
Defenders
3	Mamadou Mbodj	(Senegal)	DF	12 March 1993 (aged 28)	Žalgiris	2019	2021	54	8
5	Anton Krivotsyuk	(Azerbaijan)	DF	20 August 1998 (aged 22)	Academy	2016	2021	105	10
6	Vojislav Stanković	(Serbia)	DF	22 September 1987 (aged 33)	Gabala	2019	2021	53	3
26	Omar Buludov	(Azerbaijan)	DF	15 December 1998 (aged 22)	Academy	2016	2021	74	3
40	Vugar Hasanov	(Azerbaijan)	DF	5 December 1997 (aged 23)	Keşla	2019		0	0
49	Rener Pavão	(Brazil)	DF	18 March 2001 (aged 20)	Fortaleza	2020	2022 (+1)	0	0
51	Elchin Asadov	(Azerbaijan)	DF	3 August 1999 (aged 21)	Academy	2016		0	0
56	Elton Alibayli	(Azerbaijan)	DF	4 February 2000 (aged 21)	Academy	2019		1	0
91	Thallyson	(Brazil)	DF	1 December 1991 (aged 29)	Guarani	2020	2022	22	0
	Elvin Sarkarov	(Azerbaijan)	DF	24 February 1997 (aged 24)	Academy	2016		6	0
Midfielders
4	Keisuke Honda	(Japan)	DF	13 June 1986 (aged 34)	Unattached	2021	2021	7	2
7	Namik Alaskarov	(Azerbaijan)	MF	3 February 1995 (aged 26)	Qarabağ	2017	2022	124	31
8	Emin Mahmudov	(Azerbaijan)	MF	27 April 1992 (aged 29)	Boavista	2017	2023	107	21
17	Bruno Telushi	(Albania)	MF	14 November 1990 (aged 30)	Kukësi	2020	2021	9	0
19	Fahmin Muradbayli	(Azerbaijan)	MF	16 March 1996 (aged 25)	Academy	2013		86	6
20	Mert Çelik	(Azerbaijan)	MF	10 June 2000 (aged 20)	loan from İstanbul Başakşehir	2020	2022	12	1
24	Yusuf Lawal	(Nigeria)	MF	23 March 1998 (aged 23)	Lokeren	2020	2022 (+1)	26	2
27	Farid Yusifli	(Azerbaijan)	MF	20 February 2002 (aged 19)	Academy	2019		1	0
29	Sabir Bougrine	(Morocco)	MF	10 July 1996 (aged 24)	F91 Dudelange	2020	2022	29	4
36	Mamadou Kane	(Guinea)	MF	22 January 1997 (aged 24)	Kaloum Star	2019	2021	61	0
37	Vusal Asgarov	(Azerbaijan)	MF	23 August 2001 (aged 19)	Academy	2018		1	0
70	Asim Alizada	(Azerbaijan)	MF	5 February 2000 (aged 21)	Academy	2020		1	0
72	Emin Zamanov	(Azerbaijan)	MF	26 December 1997 (aged 23)	Academy	2019		2	0
80	Ismayil Zulfugarli	(Azerbaijan)	MF	16 April 2001 (aged 20)	Academy	2019		7	1
	Elnur Suleymanov	(Azerbaijan)	MF	17 September 1996 (aged 24)	Shuvalan	2017		1	0
Forwards
9	Ahmed Ahmedov	(Bulgaria)	FW	4 March 1995 (aged 26)	loan from CSKA Sofia	2021	2021	9	1
22	Mirabdulla Abbasov	(Azerbaijan)	FW	27 April 1995 (aged 26)	Sumgayit	2017	2021	96	20
28	Steeven Joseph-Monrose	(France)	FW	20 July 1990 (aged 30)	Gabala	2019	2021	44	12
55	Ibrahim Aliyev	(Azerbaijan)	FW	17 July 1999 (aged 21)	Sumgayit	2020	2022	3	0
Away on loan
2	Jabir Amirli	(Azerbaijan)	DF	6 January 1997 (aged 24)	Keşla	2020	2022	5	0
17	Rahman Hajiyev	(Azerbaijan)	MF	25 July 1993 (aged 27)	Baku	2014	2022	166	16
33	Turan Valizade	(Azerbaijan)	MF	1 January 2001 (aged 20)	Fenerbahçe	2019	2021	2	0
Left during the season
10	Saman Nariman Jahan	(Iran)	MF	18 April 1991 (aged 30)	Machine Sazi	2020	2021	22	1
13	Prince Ibara	(Republic of the Congo)	FW	7 February 1996 (aged 25)	loan from Beerschot	2020	2021	8	1

=== Out on loan ===
Note: Flags indicate national team as defined under FIFA eligibility rules; some limited exceptions apply. Players may hold more than one non-FIFA nationality.

No.	Pos.	Nation	Player
2	DF	AZE	Jabir Amirli (at (Azerbaijan) Sumgayit)
17	MF	AZE	Rahman Hajiyev (at (Azerbaijan) Keşla)

No.	Pos.	Nation	Player
33	MF	AZE	Turan Valizade (at (Azerbaijan) Keşla)

== Transfers ==
=== In ===
Date	Position	Nationality	Name	From	Fee	Ref.
20 June 2020	DF	(Azerbaijan)	Jabir Amirli	Keşla	Undisclosed	
16 July 2020	MF	(Nigeria)	Yusuf Lawal	Lokeren	Undisclosed	
18 July 2020	MF	(Morocco)	Sabir Bougrine	F91 Dudelange	Undisclosed	
22 July 2020	DF	(Brazil)	Rener Pavão	Fortaleza	Undisclosed	
24 July 2020	DF	(Brazil)	Thallyson	Guarani	Undisclosed	
15 October 2020	MF	(Albania)	Bruno Telushi	Kukësi	Undisclosed	
15 March 2021	MF	(Japan)	Keisuke Honda	Unattached	Free	

=== Loans in ===
Date from	Position	Nationality	Name	From	Date to	Ref.
11 September 2020	FW	(Republic of the Congo)	Prince Ibara	Beerschot	26 December 2020	
19 September 2020	MF	(Azerbaijan)	Mert Çelik	İstanbul Başakşehir	End of 2021/22 season	
9 February 2021	FW	(Bulgaria)	Ahmed Ahmedov	CSKA Sofia	End of season	

=== Loans out ===
Date from	Position	Nationality	Name	To	Date to	Ref.
8 July 2020	MF	(Azerbaijan)	Rahman Hajiyev	Keşla	End of season	
21 July 2020	MF	(Azerbaijan)	Turan Valizade	Keşla	End of season	
4 January 2021	DF	(Azerbaijan)	Jabir Amirli	Sumgayit	End of season	

=== Released ===
Date	Position	Nationality	Name	Joined	Date	Ref.
10 July 2020	FW	(Brazil)	Dário	Riga FC	23 July 2020	
14 March 2021	MF	(Iran)	Saman Nariman Jahan	Tractor		

== Friendlies ==
14 August 2020	Neftçi	2 – 1	Gabala	Baku
AZT (UTC+4)	Kane; Lawal	Report	Rajsel	Stadium: Eighth Kilometer District Stadium

10 January 2021	Neftçi	1 – 0	Keşla	Baku
AZT (UTC+4)	Alaskarov 78'	Report		Stadium: Bakcell Arena

14 January 2021	Neftçi	4 – 3	Keşla	Baku
AZT (UTC+4)	Abbasov 10'; Thallyson 36', 65'; Kane 62'	Report	Gurbanov 59'; Sílvio 61', 79'	Stadium: Bakcell Arena

== Competitions ==
=== Premier League ===
==== Results summary ====
Overall								Home						Away					
Pld	W	D	L	GF	GA	GD	Pts	W	D	L	GF	GA	GD	W	D	L	GF	GA	GD
28	18	5	5	47	25	+22	59	9	2	3	21	15	+6	9	3	2	26	10	+16

Last updated: 19 May 2021.
Source: See Results

==== Results by round ====
Round	1	2	3	4	5	6	7	8	9	10	11	12	13	14	15	16	17	18	19	20	21	22	23	24	25	26	27	28
Ground	H	H	A	H	A	H	A	A	H	A	H	A	H	A	A	H	A	H	H	H	H	A	H	A	A	A	A	H
Result	W	L	W	D	L	W	W	D	L	W	D	W	W	W	W	W	L	W	W	W	L	D	W	D	W	W	W	W
Position	2	6	3	3	3	2	4	4	4	3	3	1	1	1	1	1	1	1	1	1	2	2	2	2	2	2	2	1

Updated to match(es) played on 19 May 2021. Source: See Results
A = Away; H = Home; W = Win; D = Draw; L = Loss

==== Results ====
21 August 2020 1	Neftçi	2 – 1	Sabail	Baku
20:30 AZT (UTC+4)	Alaskarov 16', 66'; Krivotsyuk (yellow card) 57'; Mahmudov (yellow card) 90+3'; Lawal (yellow card) 90+4'; Kané (yellow card) 90+5'	Report	P.Keshavarz 79'; Kadriu (yellow card) 90+2'	Stadium: Eighth Kilometer District Stadium; Attendance: 0 Referee: Rauf Jabbarov
Note: Match played behind closed doors due to the COVID-19 pandemic.

11 September 2020 2	Neftçi	0 – 2	Sumgayit	Baku
19:00 AZT (UTC+4)	Mbodj (yellow card) 28'; Krivotsyuk (yellow card) 77' (yellow-red card) 83'	Report	Ghorbani 14', 46'; Hüseynov (yellow card) 29'	Stadium: Eighth Kilometer District Stadium; Attendance: 0 Referee: Ravan Hamzazada
Note: Match played behind closed doors due to the COVID-19 pandemic.

20 September 2020 3	Qarabağ	1 – 2	Neftçi	Baku
20:15 AZT (UTC+4)	Kwabena 10'; Medvedev (yellow card) 59'; Andrade (yellow card) 78'	Report	Stanković 12'; Kané (yellow card) 41'; Alaskarov 68'; Mbodj (yellow card) 76'	Stadium: Azersun Arena; Attendance: 0 Referee: Aliyar Agayev
Note: Match played behind closed doors due to the COVID-19 pandemic.

27 September 2020 4	Neftçi	1 – 1	Gabala	Baku
19:00 AZT (UTC+4)	Mahmudov (yellow card) 56'; Buludov (yellow card) 62'; Abbasov (yellow card) 90'; Bougrine 90+4'	Report	Gigauri (yellow card) 4'; R.Muradov 32' (yellow card) 77'; Utzig (yellow card) 45'	Stadium: Dalga Arena; Referee: Rahim Hasanov
Note: Match played at the Dalga Arena in Baku, instead of Neftçi's Eighth Kilometer District Stadium in Baku. Match played behind closed doors due to the COVID-19 pandemic.

3 October 2020 5	Zira	1 – 0	Neftçi	Zirə
16:00 AZT (UTC+4)	Chantakias (yellow card) 16'; Bayramli (yellow card) 85'; Volkovi 90+5'; Ramazanov (yellow card) 90+5'; Shirinov (yellow card) 90+5'	Report	Thallyson (yellow card) 69'	Stadium: Zira Olympic Sport Complex Stadium; Attendance: 0 Referee: Elcin Masiyev
Note: Match played behind closed doors due to the COVID-19 pandemic.

18 October 2020 6	Neftçi	1 – 0	Sabah	Baku
14:00 AZT (UTC+4)	Kané (yellow card) 3' (yellow-red card) 75'; Alaskarov 29'; Telushi (yellow card) 71'; Mammadov (yellow card) 90+2'	Report	Alkhasov (yellow card) 16'; Kökçü (yellow card) 69'; Rodríguez (yellow card) 90+1'	Stadium: Eighth Kilometer District Stadium; Attendance: 0 Referee: Aliyar Agayev
Note: Match played behind closed doors due to the COVID-19 pandemic.

24 October 2020 7	Keşla	0 – 1	Neftçi	Baku
16:00 AZT (UTC+4)	Klyots (yellow card) 33'	Report	Buludov (yellow card) 20'; Abbasov (yellow card) 67'; Alaskarov 68'; Telushi (yellow card) 78'	Stadium: ASK Arena; Attendance: 0 Referee: Raad Ahmadov
Note: Match played behind closed doors due to the COVID-19 pandemic.

1 November 2020 8	Sumgayit	0 – 0	Neftçi	Sumqayit
14:00 AZT (UTC+4)	Hemati (yellow card) 52'; Abdullazade (yellow card) 74'	Report		Stadium: Kapital Bank Arena; Attendance: 0 Referee: Rauf Jabbarov
Note: Match played behind closed doors due to the COVID-19 pandemic.

8 November 2020 9	Neftçi	0 – 6	Qarabağ	Baku
15:00 AZT (UTC+4)	Çelik (yellow card) 29'; Bougrine (yellow card) 66'	Report	Ozobić 21', 30' (pen.), 52'; Emreli 39'; Zoubir 50'; Gurbanli 75'	Stadium: Eighth Kilometer District Stadium; Attendance: 0 Referee: Rahim Hasanov
Note: Match played behind closed doors due to the COVID-19 pandemic.

22 November 2020 10	Gabala	1 – 4	Neftçi	Qabala
14:00 AZT (UTC+4)	Nabiyev 60'; Musayev (yellow card) 60'	Report	Krivotsyuk (yellow card) 13' (goal) 38', 51'; Lawal (yellow card) 28'; Alaskarov 57'; Ibara 90+4'	Stadium: Gabala City Stadium; Attendance: 0 Referee: Ravan Hamzazada
Note: Match played behind closed doors due to the COVID-19 pandemic.

28 November 2020 11	Neftçi	0 – 0	Zira	Baku
16:00 AZT (UTC+4)	Bougrine (yellow card) 85'	Report	Jamalov (yellow card) 89'	Stadium: Eighth Kilometer District Stadium; Attendance: 0 Referee: Vugar Hasanli

20 December 2020 12	Sabah	0 – 2	Neftçi	Masazır
17:15 AZT (UTC+4)	Diniyev (yellow card) 45+3'; Isayev (yellow card) 69'; Rodríguez (yellow card) 86'	Report	Buludov (yellow card) 45+1'; Alaskarov 45+3' (pen.), 65'	Stadium: Bank Respublika Arena; Attendance: 0 Referee: Aliyar Agayev
Note: Match originally scheduled for 5 December, but postponed. Match played behind closed doors due to the COVID-19 pandemic.

24 December 2020 13	Neftçi	2 – 1	Keşla	Baku
18:00 AZT (UTC+4)	Krivotsyuk (yellow card) 18'; Abbasov 65', 81'	Report	Hajiyev 68'	Stadium: Eighth Kilometer District Stadium; Attendance: 0 Referee: Elcin Masiyev
Note: Match played behind closed doors due to the COVID-19 pandemic.

21 January 2021 14	Sabail	1 – 3	Neftçi	Baku
16:00 AZT (UTC+4)	Ismayilov 29' (pen.) (yellow card) 39'; Beybalayev (yellow card) 50'	Report	Bougrine (yellow card) 12' (goal) 45', 90'; Thallyson (yellow card) 26'; Mammadov (yellow card) 28'; Mahmudov 51'; Çelik (yellow card) 73'; Telushi (yellow card) 85'	Stadium: Bayil Arena; Attendance: 0 Referee: Kamal Umudlu
Note: Match played behind closed doors due to the COVID-19 pandemic.

13 February 2021 15	Qarabağ	1 – 2	Neftçi	Baku
18:30 AZT (UTC+4)	Emreli 57'; Medina (red card) 73'; Bayramov (yellow card) 73'; Romero (yellow card) 75'	Report	Buludov (red card) 22'; Alaskarov 28', 75' (pen.); Stanković (yellow card) 36' (yellow-red card) 90+3'; Krivotsyuk (yellow card) 38'; Kané (yellow card) 41' (yellow-red card) 73'; Mahmudov (yellow card) 60'	Stadium: Azersun Arena; Attendance: 0 Referee: Elcin Masiyev
Note: Match originally scheduled for 4 October, but postponed on 30 September.

20 February 2021 16	Neftçi	1 – 0	Gabala	Baku
18:00 AZT (UTC+4)	Alaskarov (yellow card) 33'; Mahmudov 90+4'	Report	Goxha (yellow card) 26'; Ahmadov (yellow card) 27'; Adeniyi (yellow card) 45+2'; R.Muradov (yellow card) 82'	Stadium: Eighth Kilometer District Stadium; Attendance: 0 Referee: Ingilab Mammadov
Note: Match played behind closed doors due to the COVID-19 pandemic.

25 February 2021 17	Zira	1 – 0	Neftçi	Zirə
16:00 AZT (UTC+4)	Volkovi 67'	Report	Kané (yellow card) 9'; Mbodj (yellow card) 72'; Thallyson (yellow card) 77'; Krivotsyuk (yellow card) 88'	Stadium: Zira Olympic Sport Complex Stadium; Attendance: 0 Referee: Aliyar Agayev
Note: Match played behind closed doors due to the COVID-19 pandemic.

3 March 2021 18	Neftçi	2 – 1	Sabah	Baku
18:15 AZT (UTC+4)	Alaskarov 44'; Lawal (yellow card) 49'; Ahmedov (yellow card) 59'; Abbasov 64'	Report	Ivanović (yellow card) 86'; Khalilzade 90+3' (pen.)	Stadium: Eighth Kilometer District Stadium; Attendance: 0 Referee: Raad Ahmadov
Note: Match played behind closed doors due to the COVID-19 pandemic.

8 March 2021 19	Neftçi	3 – 1	Keşla	Baku
18:15 AZT (UTC+4)	Alaskarov 6', 64' (pen.) (yellow card) 69'; Buludov 19'; Mahmudov (yellow card) 33'; Mbodj (yellow card) 59'	Report	Meza (yellow card) 8'; Kamara (yellow card) 24'; Salahli 81'	Stadium: Eighth Kilometer District Stadium; Attendance: 0 Referee: Rauf Jabbarov
Note: Match played behind closed doors due to the COVID-19 pandemic.

14 March 2021 20	Neftçi	4 – 0	Sabail	Baku
17:15 AZT (UTC+4)	Alaskarov 5' (yellow card) 45+1'; Joseph-Monrose 66'; Lawal 70'; Çelik 75'	Report	Ismayilov (yellow card) 18'; Yunanov (yellow card) 27'; Petrovikj (yellow card) 30'; Abbasov (yellow card) 43'	Stadium: Eighth Kilometer District Stadium; Attendance: 0 Referee: Kamal Umudlu
Note: Match played behind closed doors due to the COVID-19 pandemic.

4 April 2021 21	Neftçi	0 – 2	Sumgayit	Baku
16:30 AZT (UTC+4)	Kané (yellow card) 25'; Mbodj (yellow card) 39'; Stanković (yellow card) 41'; Joseph-Monrose (yellow card) 41'; Honda (yellow card) 64'; Mahmudov (yellow card) 72'; Alaskarov (yellow card) 77'; Krivotsyuk (yellow card) 87'	Report	Sadykhov 5', 42' (pen.); Najafov (yellow card) 33'; Ghorbani (yellow card) 55'; Khodzhaniyazov (yellow card) 72'	Stadium: Eighth Kilometer District Stadium; Attendance: 0 Referee: Ingilab Mammadov
Note: Match played behind closed doors due to the COVID-19 pandemic.

10 April 2021 22	Gabala	2 – 2	Neftçi	Qabala
16:00 AZT (UTC+4)	Utzig (yellow card) 35'; Shahverdiyev (yellow card) 44'; Adeniyi 54' (yellow card) 62'; Goxha 67' (yellow card) 70'; Mirzayev (yellow card) 65'; Nazirov (yellow card) 90+1'	Report	Mahmudov (yellow card) 28' (goal) 71' (pen.); Çelik (yellow card) 37'; Abbasov 62'	Stadium: Gabala City Stadium; Attendance: 0 Referee: Aliyar Agayev
Note: Match played behind closed doors due to the COVID-19 pandemic.

17 April 2021 23	Neftçi	4 – 0	Zira	Baku
20:15 AZT (UTC+4)	Lawal (yellow card) 31'; Alaskarov 47', 77'; Honda (yellow card) 71'; Abbasov 74'; Joseph-Monrose 90+2'	Report		Stadium: Eighth Kilometer District Stadium; Attendance: 0 Referee: Rauf Jabbarov
Note: Match played behind closed doors due to the COVID-19 pandemic.

25 April 2021 24	Sabah	2 – 2	Neftçi	Masazır
19:15 AZT (UTC+4)	Khalilzade 24' (pen.) (yellow card) 89' (yellow-red card) 89'; Ivanović (yellow card) 28' (yellow-red card) 86'; Sheydayev 30' (yellow card) 84'; Mustafazade (yellow card) 34' (yellow-red card) 58'; Stamenković (yellow card) 82'	Report	Stanković (yellow card) 4'; Mammadov (yellow card) 23'; Honda (yellow card) 23'; Kane (yellow card) 32'; Alaskarov 36' (pen.), 60' (pen.); Mahmudov (yellow card) 48'; Abbasov (yellow card) 72'; Bougrine (yellow card) 90+7'	Stadium: Bank Respublika Arena; Attendance: 0 Referee: Vugar Hasanli
Note: Match played behind closed doors due to the COVID-19 pandemic.

3 May 2021 25	Keşla	0 – 3	Neftçi	Baku
18:00 AZT (UTC+4)	Guliyev (yellow card) 50'; Gurbanov (yellow card) 59'; Valizade (yellow card) 90+1'	Report	Abbasov 38'; Kane (yellow card) 59'; Honda 74'; Mahmudov 90+2'	Stadium: ASK Arena; Attendance: 0 Referee: Aliyar Agayev
Note: Match played behind closed doors due to the COVID-19 pandemic.

8 May 2021 26	Sabail	0 – 4	Neftçi	Baku
20:15 AZT (UTC+4)	L.Imnadze (yellow card) 23'; Hagen (yellow card) 78'	Report	Stanković 13'; Lawal (yellow card) 62'; Bougrine (yellow card) 64'; Honda 72'; Alaskarov 79' (pen.); Çelik (yellow card) 85'; Krivotsyuk (yellow card) 88'	Stadium: Bayil Arena; Attendance: 0 Referee: Elcin Masiyev
Note: Match played behind closed doors due to the COVID-19 pandemic.

14 May 2021 27	Sumgayit	0 – 1	Neftçi	Sumqayit
19:00 AZT (UTC+4)	Hüseynov (yellow card) 45'; Sharifi (yellow card) 76'; Haghverdi (yellow card) 88'; E.Mammadov (yellow card) 90+1'	Report	Joseph-Monrose (yellow card) 8'; Bougrine (yellow card) 36'; Stanković 45'	Stadium: Kapital Bank Arena; Attendance: 0 Referee: Rauf Jabbarov
Note: Match played behind closed doors due to the COVID-19 pandemic.

19 May 2021 28	Neftçi	1 – 0	Qarabağ	Baku
20:30 AZT (UTC+4)	Krivotsyuk (yellow card) 84'; Ahmedov 90'; Mammadov (yellow card) 90+4'	Report	Medvedev (yellow card) 8'; Kwabena (yellow card) 90+3'; Jafarguliyev (yellow card) 90+4'; Bayramov (yellow card) 90+6'	Stadium: Dalga Arena; Attendance: 0 Referee: Elcin Masiyev
Note: Match played behind closed doors due to the COVID-19 pandemic.

==== League table ====
Pos	Team	Pld	W	D	L	GF	GA	GD	Pts	Qualification
1	Neftçi Baku (C)	28	18	5	5	47	25	+22	59	Qualification for the Champions League first qualifying round
2	Qarabağ	28	16	9	3	64	18	+46	57	Qualification to Europa Conference League second qualifying round
3	Sumgayit	28	10	9	9	30	31	−1	39	Qualification to Europa Conference League second qualifying round
4	Zira	28	8	14	6	28	28	0	38	
5	Sabah	28	7	8	13	28	38	−10	29	

Source: Soccerway
Rules for classification: 1) Points; 2) Head-to-head points; 3) Head-to-head goal difference; 4) Head-to-head goals scored; 5) Head-to-head away goals scored (only if two teams); 6) Goal difference; 7) Goals scored.
(C) Champions

=== Azerbaijan Cup ===
2 February 2021 Quarterfinal 1st leg	Neftçi	0 – 1	Zira	Baku
18:00 AZT (UTC+4)	Kane (yellow card) 60'; Bougrine (yellow card) 90+5'	Report	Muradov 26'; Hajili (yellow card) 44'; Chantakias (yellow card) 90'	Stadium: Eighth Kilometer District Stadium; Attendance: 0 Referee: Raad Ahmadov
Note: Match played behind closed doors due to the COVID-19 pandemic in Azerbaijan.

7 February 2021 Quarterfinal 2nd leg	Zira	0 – 0 (1 – 0 agg.)	Neftçi	Zirə
17:30 AZT (UTC+4)	Richard (yellow card) 15'; Jamalov (yellow card) 24'; Volkovi (yellow card) 41'; Clésio (yellow card) 67'	Report	Mahmudov (yellow card) 28'; Krivotsyuk (yellow card) 80'; Stanković (yellow card) 85'	Stadium: Zira Olympic Sport Complex Stadium; Attendance: 0 Referee: Ingilab Mammadov
Note: Match played behind closed doors due to the COVID-19 pandemic in Azerbaijan.

=== UEFA Europa League ===
==== Qualifying rounds ====
27 August 2020 First qualifying round	Neftçi (Azerbaijan)	2 – 1	(North Macedonia) Shkupi	Baku, Azerbaijan
20:00 AZT (UTC+4)	Krivotsyuk (yellow card) 42' (goal) 88'; Kane (yellow card) 49'; Bougrine 66'	Report	Goudiaby (yellow card) 40' (yellow-red card) 70'; Iseni (yellow card) 46'; Darboe 90+3'	Stadium: Eighth Kilometer District Stadium; Attendance: 0 Referee: Aleksandrs Golubevs (Latvia)
Note: Match played behind closed doors.

17 September 2020 Second qualifying round	Neftçi (Azerbaijan)	1 – 3	(Turkey) Galatasaray	Baku, Azerbaijan
20:00 AZT (UTC+4)	Ibara (yellow card) 18'; Alaskarov (yellow card) 35'; Mbodj 47'; Kane (yellow card) 69'; Krivotsyuk (yellow card) 87'; Bougrine (yellow card) 89'	Report	Diagne 19', 63'; Luyindama 48'; Feghouli (yellow card) 54'; Saracchi (yellow card) 90+2'	Stadium: Eighth Kilometer District Stadium; Attendance: 0 Referee: Kevin Clancy (Scotland)
Note: Match played behind closed doors.

== Squad statistics ==
As of Match played 19 May 2021

=== Appearances and goals ===
No.	Pos	Nat	Player	Total		Premier League		Azerbaijan Cup		Europa League	
No.	Pos	Nat	Player	Apps	Goals	Apps	Goals	Apps	Goals	Apps	Goals
1	GK	(Azerbaijan) AZE	Salahat Aghayev	3	0	1	0	2	0	0	0
3	DF	(Senegal) SEN	Mamadou Mbodj	27	1	21+2	0	2	0	2	1
4	MF	(Japan) JPN	Keisuke Honda	7	2	6+1	2	0	0	0	0
5	DF	(Azerbaijan) AZE	Anton Krivotsyuk	25	3	21	2	2	0	2	1
6	DF	(Serbia) SRB	Vojislav Stanković	31	3	25+2	3	2	0	1+1	0
7	MF	(Azerbaijan) AZE	Namik Alaskarov	30	19	26	19	1+1	0	2	0
8	MF	(Azerbaijan) AZE	Emin Mahmudov	27	4	23	4	2	0	2	0
9	FW	(Bulgaria) BUL	Ahmed Ahmedov	9	1	2+7	1	0	0	0	0
17	MF	(Albania) ALB	Bruno Telushi	9	0	6+3	0	0	0	0	0
19	MF	(Azerbaijan) AZE	Fahmin Muradbayli	13	0	5+7	0	1	0	0	0
20	MF	(Azerbaijan) AZE	Mert Çelik	12	1	10+2	1	0	0	0	0
22	FW	(Azerbaijan) AZE	Mirabdulla Abbasov	27	6	14+9	6	2	0	0+2	0
24	MF	(Nigeria) NGR	Yusuf Lawal	26	2	23+1	2	0	0	2	0
26	DF	(Azerbaijan) AZE	Omar Buludov	24	1	20+3	1	0	0	1	0
27	MF	(Azerbaijan) AZE	Farid Yusifli	1	0	0+1	0	0	0	0	0
28	FW	(France) FRA	Steeven Joseph-Monrose	17	2	8+7	2	0+1	0	1	0
29	MF	(Morocco) MAR	Sabir Bougrine	29	4	21+4	3	2	0	1+1	1
30	GK	(Azerbaijan) AZE	Agil Mammadov	29	0	27	0	0	0	2	0
36	MF	(Guinea) GUI	Mamadou Kane	29	0	25	0	2	0	2	0
37	MF	(Azerbaijan) AZE	Vusal Asgarov	1	0	0+1	0	0	0	0	0
56	DF	(Azerbaijan) AZE	Elton Alibayli	1	0	0+1	0	0	0	0	0
70	MF	(Azerbaijan) AZE	Asim Alizada	1	0	0+1	0	0	0	0	0
72	MF	(Azerbaijan) AZE	Emin Zamanov	2	0	0+2	0	0	0	0	0
80	MF	(Azerbaijan) AZE	Ismayil Zulfugarli	2	0	0+2	0	0	0	0	0
91	DF	(Brazil) BRA	Thallyson	22	0	16+2	0	2	0	1+1	0
Players away on loan:
2	DF	(Azerbaijan) AZE	Jabir Amirli	5	0	2+2	0	0	0	1	0
Players who left Neftçi during the season:
10	MF	(Iran) IRI	Saman Nariman Jahan	16	0	4+9	0	2	0	1	0
13	FW	(Republic of the Congo) CGO	Prince Ibara	8	1	2+5	1	0	0	1	0

=== Goal scorers ===
Place	Position	Nation	Number	Name	Premier League	Azerbaijan Cup	Europa League	Total
1	MF	(Azerbaijan)	7	Namik Alaskarov	19	0	0	19
2	FW	(Azerbaijan)	22	Mirabdulla Abbasov	6	0	0	6
3	MF	(Azerbaijan)	8	Emin Mahmudov	4	0	0	4
3	MF	(Morocco)	29	Sabir Bougrine	3	0	1	4
5	DF	(Serbia)	6	Vojislav Stanković	3	0	0	3
5	DF	(Azerbaijan)	5	Anton Krivotsyuk	2	0	1	3
7	FW	(France)	28	Steeven Joseph-Monrose	2	0	0	2
7	MF	(Nigeria)	24	Yusuf Lawal	2	0	0	2
7	MF	(Japan)	4	Keisuke Honda	2	0	0	2
10	FW	(Republic of the Congo)	13	Prince Ibara	1	0	0	1
10	DF	(Azerbaijan)	26	Omar Buludov	1	0	0	1
10	MF	(Azerbaijan)	20	Mert Çelik	1	0	0	1
10	FW	(Bulgaria)	9	Ahmed Ahmedov	1	0	0	1
10	DF	(Senegal)	3	Mamadou Mbodj	0	0	1	1
				TOTALS	47	0	3	50

=== Clean sheets ===
Place	Position	Nation	Number	Name	Premier League	Azerbaijan Cup	Europa League	Total
1	GK	(Azerbaijan)	30	Agil Mammadov	1	0	0	11
2	GK	(Azerbaijan)	1	Salahat Aghayev	0	1	0	1
				TOTALS	11	1	0	12

=== Disciplinary record ===
Number	Nation	Position	Name	Premier League		Azerbaijan Cup		Europa League		Total	
Number	Nation	Position	Name	Yellow card	Red card	Yellow card	Red card	Yellow card	Red card	Yellow card	Red card
3	(Senegal)	DF	Mamadou Mbodj	5	0	0	0	0	0	5	0
4	(Japan)	MF	Keisuke Honda	3	0	0	0	0	0	3	0
5	(Azerbaijan)	DF	Anton Krivotsyuk	10	1	1	0	2	0	13	1
6	(Serbia)	DF	Vojislav Stanković	4	1	1	0	0	0	5	1
7	(Azerbaijan)	MF	Namik Alaskarov	4	0	0	0	1	0	5	0
8	(Azerbaijan)	MF	Emin Mahmudov	7	0	1	0	0	0	8	0
9	(Bulgaria)	FW	Ahmed Ahmedov	1	0	0	0	0	0	1	0
17	(Albania)	MF	Bruno Telushi	3	0	0	0	0	0	3	0
20	(Azerbaijan)	MF	Mert Çelik	4	0	0	0	0	0	4	0
22	(Azerbaijan)	FW	Mirabdulla Abbasov	3	0	0	0	0	0	3	0
24	(Nigeria)	MF	Yusuf Lawal	4	0	0	0	0	0	4	0
26	(Azerbaijan)	DF	Omar Buludov	3	1	0	0	0	0	3	1
28	(France)	FW	Steeven Joseph-Monrose	2	0	0	0	0	0	2	0
29	(Morocco)	MF	Sabir Bougrine	6	0	1	0	1	0	8	0
30	(Azerbaijan)	GK	Agil Mammadov	4	0	0	0	0	0	4	0
36	(Guinea)	MF	Mamadou Kane	10	2	1	0	2	0	13	2
91	(Brazil)	DF	Thallyson	3	0	0	0	0	0	3	0
Players who left Neftçi during the season:
13	(Republic of the Congo)	FW	Prince Ibara	0	0	0	0	1	0	1	0
			TOTALS	76	5	5	0	7	0	88	5
