= 2021–22 Azerbaijan Premier League =

Azerbaijan Premier League
- Season: 2021–22
- Dates: 14 August 2021 – 22 May 2022
- Champions: Qarabağ
- Champions League: Qarabağ
- Europa Conference League: Neftçi; Zira; Gabala
- Matches: 108
- Goals: 279 (2.58 per match)
- Top goalscorer: Kady Borges (12 goals)
- Biggest home win: Qarabağ 8–0 Shamakhi (15 April 2022)
- Biggest away win: Sumgayit 0–4 Qarabağ (7 November 2021); Sumgayit 0–4 Gabala (27 February 2022)
- Highest scoring: Qarabağ 8–0 Shamakhi (15 April 2022)
- Longest winning run: 7 matches Qarabağ
- Longest unbeaten run: 19 matches Qarabağ
- Longest winless run: 15 matches Sumgayit
- Longest losing run: 6 matches Sabail
- All statistics correct as of 15 May 2022.

The 2021–22 Azerbaijan Premier League was the 30th season of the Azerbaijan Premier League, the highest tier football league of Azerbaijan. The season began on 14 August 2021 and finished on 22 May 2022.

== Teams ==
On 6 April 2022, the Azerbaijan Premier League approved the name change of Keşla FK to Shamakhi FK.

Locations of the 2020–21 Azerbaijan Premier League teams.
Team in italics is from a zone of the Nagorno-Karabakh conflict and is playing its home games in Baku.

=== Stadia and locations ===
Note: Table lists in alphabetical order.

Team	Year Established	Location	Venue	Capacity
Gabala	1995	Qabala	Gabala City Stadium	4,500
Shamakhi	1997	Shamakhi	Shamakhi City Stadium	2,200
Neftchi Baku	1937	Baku	Bakcell Arena	11,000
Qarabağ	1951	Aghdam	Azersun Arena	5,200
Sabah	2017	Absheron	Bank Respublika Arena	13,000
Sabail	2016	Səbail	Bayil Arena	3,200
Sumgayit	2010	Sumqayit	Kapital Bank Arena	1,400
Zira	2014	Zira	Zira Olympic Sport Complex Stadium	1,300

=== Stadiums ===
Gabala	Shamakhi	Qarabağ	Neftçi Baku
Gabala City Stadium	Shamakhi City Stadium	Azersun Arena	Bakcell Arena
Capacity: **4,500**	Capacity: **2,200**	Capacity: **5,200**	Capacity: **10,200**
Sabah	Sabail	Sumgayit	Zira
Bank Respublika Arena	ASCO Arena	Kapital Bank Arena	Zira Olympic Sport Complex Stadium
Capacity: **13,000**	Capacity: **3,200**	Capacity: **1,400**	Capacity: **1,300**

=== Personnel and kits ===
Note: Flags indicate national team as has been defined under FIFA eligibility rules. Players and managers may hold more than one non-FIFA nationality.

Team	President	Manager	Captain	Kit manufacturer	Shirt sponsor
Gabala	(Azerbaijan) Fariz Najafov	(Azerbaijan) Elmar Bakhshiyev	(Azerbaijan) Asif Mammadov	Joma	Gilan & Knauf
Shamakhi	(Azerbaijan) Zaur Akhundov	(Azerbaijan) Sanan Gurbanov	(Azerbaijan) Ilkin Qirtimov	Joma	Samaya LTD
Neftçi Baku	(Azerbaijan) Kamran Guliyev	(Azerbaijan) Samir Abbasov	(Azerbaijan) Emin Mahmudov	Nike	Turkish Airlines
Qarabağ	(Turkey) Abdolbari Gozal	(Azerbaijan) Gurban Gurbanov	(Azerbaijan) Maksim Medvedev	Adidas	Azersun
Sabah	(Azerbaijan) Magsud Adigozalov	(Russia) Murad Musayev	(Azerbaijan) Ruslan Abışov	Nike	Bank Respublika
Sabail	(Azerbaijan) Rashad Abdullayev	(Azerbaijan) Aftandil Hacıyev	(Azerbaijan) Rahid Amirguliyev	Nike	AzTea
Sumgayit	(Azerbaijan) Riad Rafiyev	(Belarus) Alyaksey Baha	(Azerbaijan) Vurğun Hüseynov	Jako	Pasha Insurance Azərikimya
Zira	(Azerbaijan) Taleh Nasibov	(Azerbaijan) Rashad Sadygov	(Azerbaijan) Aghabala Ramazanov	Joma	Bakcell, Azfargroup

=== Managerial changes ===
Team	Outgoing manager	Manner of departure	Date of vacancy	Position in table	Incoming manager	Date of appointment
Sabah	(Azerbaijan) Ramin Guliyev (Acting Head Coach)	End of role	26 May 2021	Pre-season	(Azerbaijan) Ramin Guliyev	26 May 2021
Sabah	(Azerbaijan) Ramin Guliyev	Resigned	21 October 2021	8th	(Russia) Murad Musayev	30 October 2021
Sumgayit	(Azerbaijan) Aykhan Abbasov	Sacked	16 December 2021	7th	(Belarus) Alyaksey Baha	30 December 2021

=== Foreign players ===
Each team could use a maximum of six foreign players on the field in each game.

Club	Player 1	Player 2	Player 3	Player 4	Player 5	Player 6	Player 7	Player 8	Player 9	Player 10	Player 11	Player 12	Player 13	Player 14	Left during the season
Gabala	(Albania) Isnik Alimi	(Brazil) Patrick	(Brazil) Ruan	(Brazil) Raphael Alemão	(Cameroon) Christophe Atangana	(Jordan) **Omar Hani**	(Montenegro) Stefan Vukčević	(Spain) Fernán López	(Togo) Yaovi Akakpo						
Shamakhi	(Angola) Aldair Neto	(Argentina) Franco Flores	(Brazil) Felipe Santos	(Georgia (country)) **Merab Gigauri**	(Mali) Sadio Tounkara	(Moldova) **Stanislav Namașco**	(Nigeria) Nathan Oduwa								(Cameroon) **Anatole Abang** (Montenegro) Mijuško Bojović (Senegal) Oumar Goudiaby (Sierra Leone) John Kamara
Neftçi	(Brazil) Tiago Bezerra	(Brazil) Ramon Machado	(Brazil) Guilherme Pato	(Croatia) Ivan Brkić	(Nigeria) Yusuf Lawal	(Paraguay) César Meza	(Portugal) Hugo Basto	(Russia) Azer Aliyev	(Senegal) Mamadou Mbodj	(Serbia) **Vojislav Stanković**					(Argentina) Jorge Correa (France) Romain Basque (Guinea) Mamadou Kane (Morocco) Sabir Bougrine (São Tomé and Príncipe) Harramiz
Qarabağ	(Brazil) Kady	(Cape Verde) **Leandro Andrade**	(Cape Verde) **Patrick Andrade**	(Colombia) Kevin Medina	(France) Abdellah Zoubir	(Georgia (country)) Luka Gugeshashvili	(Montenegro) **Marko Vešović**	(Senegal) Ibrahima Wadji	(Spain) Jaime Romero						(Spain) Gaspar Panadero
Sabah	(Belarus) Alyaksandr Nyachayew	(Bosnia and Herzegovina) Bojan Letić	(Brazil) Christian	(Brazil) Higor Gabriel	(Brazil) Lucas Rangel	(Croatia) Špiro Peričić	(Georgia (country)) Mikheil Ergemlidze	(Germany) Joy-Lance Mickels	(Ivory Coast) Tiemoko Fofana	(Paraguay) Julio Rodríguez	(Spain) Juan Cámara	(Spain) Cristian Ceballos	(Ukraine) Zurab Ochihava	(Ukraine) Oleksiy Kashchuk	(Serbia) Petar Škuletić (Serbia) Saša Stamenković
Sabail	(Albania) Jurgen Goxha	(Liberia) **Jamal Arago**	(Lithuania) **Domantas Šimkus**	(Slovenia) Nicolas Rajsel											
Sumgayit	(Russia) Dzhamaldin Khodzhaniyazov	(Russia) Ilnur Valiev													(Iran) Saeid Bagherpasand
Zira	(Belgium) Loris Brogno	(Brazil) Filipe Pachtmann	(France) Hamidou Keyta	(Georgia (country)) **Davit Volkovi**	(Greece) Dimitrios Chantakias	(Haiti) **Bryan Alceus**	(Netherlands) Mo Hamdaoui	(Serbia) Nemanja Anđelković	(Nigeria) Ahmed Isaiah						(Brazil) Welves (North Macedonia) Gjorgi Stoilov

In bold: Players that capped for their national team.

== League table ==
Pos	Team	Pld	W	D	L	GF	GA	GD	Pts	Qualification
1	Qarabağ (C)	28	21	6	1	72	13	+59	69	Qualification for the Champions League first qualifying round
2	Neftçi Baku	28	15	5	8	42	31	+11	50	Qualification to Europa Conference League second qualifying round
3	Zira	28	13	8	7	33	27	+6	47	Qualification to Europa Conference League second qualifying round
4	Gabala	28	12	9	7	38	34	+4	45	Qualification to Europa Conference League second qualifying round
5	Sabah	28	12	5	11	42	34	+8	41	
6	Sumgayit	28	5	7	16	22	46	−24	22 (Note: Head-to-head points: Sumgayit 7, Shamakhi 4.)	
7	Shamakhi	28	5	7	16	25	49	−24	22	
8	Sabail	28	4	3	21	17	57	−40	15	

Source: Soccerway
Rules for classification: 1) Points; 2) Head-to-head points; 3) Head-to-head goal difference; 4) Head-to-head goals scored; 5) Head-to-head away goals scored (only if two teams); 6) Goal difference; 7) Goals scored.
(C) Champions

== Fixtures and results ==
Clubs played each other four times for a total of 28 matches each.

=== Matches 1–14 ===
Home \ Away	GAB	NEF	QAR	SAB	SEB	SHA	SUM	ZIR
Gabala		1–1	0–0	1–3	5–0	2–1	2–1	1–1
Neftçi Baku	2–2		1–2	1–2	1–0	3–0	0–0	2–1
Qarabağ	2–0	4–0		5–1	3–0	1–0	2–0	2–0
Sabah	0–2	1–2	1–2		0–1	2–1	3–0	3–3
Sabail	0–2	1–3	3–1	0–3		1–2	1–0	1–2
Shamakhi	2–3	3–2	1–1	2–0	2–2		0–2	0–2
Sumgayit	0–0	1–1	0–4	2–0	2–0	1–3		0–3
Zira	1–2	1–2	1–1	1–1	3–1	2–0	1–0	

Source: soccerway.com
Legend: Blue = home team win; Yellow = draw; Red = away team win.

=== Matches 15–28 ===
Home \ Away	GAB	NEF	QAR	SAB	SEB	SHA	SUM	ZIR
Gabala		1–0	0–2	1–1	2–0	1–1	1–1	0–0
Neftçi Baku	4–0		1–2	1–0	2–0	3–1	2–1	0–1
Qarabağ	5–1	4–1		1–1	5–1	8–0	5–0	0–0
Sabah	3–0	0–1	0–1		1–0	5–1	2–2	3–1
Sabail	3–0	0–1	0–3	0–2		0–3	1–1	0–1
Shamakhi	0–1	1–2	0–0	0–1	0–0		1–1	0–1
Sumgayit	0–4	0–2	0–3	0–3	5–0	2–0		0–1
Zira	0–3	1–1	0–3	2–0	2–1	0–0	1–0	

Source: soccerway.com
Legend: Blue = home team win; Yellow = draw; Red = away team win.

== Season statistics ==
=== Top scorers ===
As of match played 15 May 2022

Rank	Player	Club	Goals
1	(Germany) Joy-Lance Mickels	Sabah	11
1	(Georgia (country)) Davit Volkovi	Zira	11
1	(Brazil) Kady	Qarabağ	11
1	(Azerbaijan) Filip Ozobić	Qarabağ	11
1	(Senegal) Ibrahima Wadji	Qarabağ	11
6	(Brazil) Tiago Bezerra	Neftçi	10
7	(France) Abdellah Zoubir	Qarabağ	8
7	(Albania) Isnik Alimi	Gabala	8
7	(Azerbaijan) Musa Gurbanli	Qarabağ	8
10	(Azerbaijan) Ramil Sheydayev	Qarabağ	7

=== Hat-tricks ===
Player	For	Against	Result	Date	Ref
(Georgia (country)) Davit Volkovi	Zira	Sabah	3-3 (A)	6 November 2021	

=== Clean sheets ===
As of matches played 15 May 2022

Rank	Player	Club	Clean sheets
1	(Azerbaijan) Nijat Mehbaliyev	Gabala	11
2	(Azerbaijan) Mehdi Jannatov	Zira	10
2	(Azerbaijan) Şahruddin Mahammadaliyev	Qarabağ	10
4	(Croatia) Ivan Brkić	Neftçi	5
5	(Azerbaijan) Salahat Aghayev	Sabah	4
5	(Moldova) Stanislav Namașco	Shamakhi	4
5	(Azerbaijan) Aydin Bayramov	Sumgayit	4
8	(Azerbaijan) Kamran Ibrahimov	Neftçi	3
8	(Azerbaijan) Emil Balayev	Qarabağ	3
8	(Azerbaijan) Yusif İmanov	Sabah	3

== See also ==
- Azerbaijan Premier League
- Azerbaijan First Division
- Azerbaijan Cup
