= Vojislav Stanković =

Serbian footballer

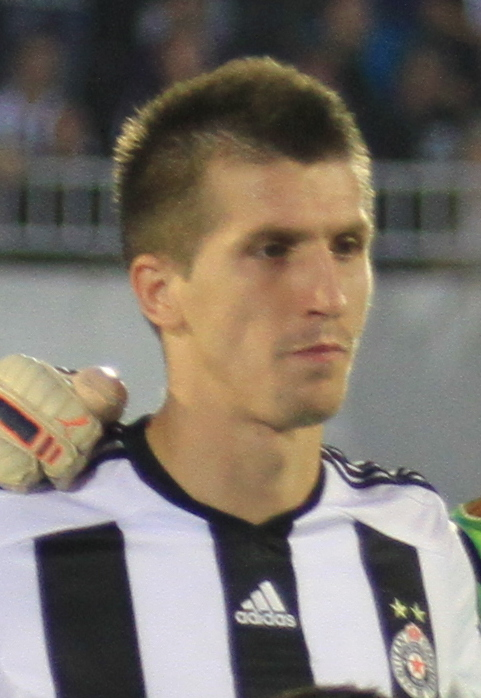
- Stanković in 2014

Personal information
- Date of birth: 22 September 1987 (age 39)
- Place of birth: Vranje, SR Serbia, SFR Yugoslavia
- Height: 1.90 m (6 ft 3 in)
- Position: Defender

Youth career
- Soko Vranje
- Dinamo Vranje

Senior career*
Years	Team	Apps	(Gls)
2006–2008	Dinamo Vranje	58	(0)
2009	OFK Beograd	25	(0)
2010–2015	Partizan	69	(1)
2015–2016	Inter Baku	12	(1)
2015–2016	→ Gabala (loan)	35	(0)
2016–2019	Gabala	57	(1)
2019–2023	Neftçi	97	(7)
2023–2024	Železničar Pančevo	36	(2)
2024–2026	Teleoptik	40	(1)
Total		429	(13)

International career
2010	Serbia	1	(0)
- * Club domestic league appearances and goals as of 27 June 2026

Vojislav Stanković (Serbian Cyrillic: Војислав Станковић; born 22 September 1987) is a Serbian retired professional footballer who played as a defender.

== Club career ==
=== Early years ===
Stanković made his senior debut with his hometown club Dinamo Vranje, before moving to OFK Beograd in the 2009 winter transfer window. He quickly became an important part of the team under manager Dejan Đurđević.

=== Partizan ===
In the 2010 winter transfer window, Stanković was transferred to Partizan, signing a five-year deal. He made his competitive debut for the club in a league fixture versus Čukarički on 20 March 2010, coming in as a substitute for Mladen Krstajić in the second half of the match that Partizan won 3–0. Until the end of the 2009–10 season, Stanković made 10 league appearances, as the club won its third consecutive championship title.

On 24 August 2010, Stanković scored the winning goal in the penalty shoot-out against Anderlecht in Brussels, as the club advanced to the group stage of the UEFA Champions League for the first time after seven years. However, Stanković failed to become a first team regular, making only 19 league appearances in three seasons (2010–2013).

Stanković finally became a first team regular in the 2013–14 season, making 25 league appearances and scoring once. He scored his first official goal for Partizan in a 3–2 home win over Donji Srem on 9 November 2013.

=== Azerbaijan ===
In February 2015, Stanković signed a two-year contract with Azerbaijani club Inter Baku. In June 2015, Stanković moved to fellow Azerbaijani club Gabala on an 18-month loan deal. On 16 December 2017, Stanković signed a new contract with Gabala until the end of 2019.

On 4 June 2019, Stanković signed a two-year contract with Neftçi. On 16 June 2021, Stanković signed a new one-year contract, with the option of an additional year, with Neftçi. On 10 July 2023, Neftçi announced the departure of Stanković after his contract expired.

=== Return to Serbia ===
In August 2024, the Serbian League Belgrade club Teleoptik signed a contract with Stanković.

== International career ==
Stanković made one appearance for the Serbia national team in a friendly match against Japan on 7 April 2010 in Osaka.

== Career statistics ==
=== Club ===
Appearances and goals by club, season and competition
Club	Season	League			National Cup		Continental		Other		Total	
Club	Season	Division	Apps	Goals	Apps	Goals	Apps	Goals	Apps	Goals	Apps	Goals
Dinamo Vranje	2006–07	Serbian First League	22	0	–		–		–		22	0
Dinamo Vranje	2007–08	Serbian League East	19	0	–		–		–		19	0
Dinamo Vranje	2008–09	Serbian First League	17	0			–		–		17	0
Dinamo Vranje	Total		58	0			-	-	-	-	58	0
OFK Beograd	2008–09	Serbian SuperLiga	10	0			0	0	–		10	0
OFK Beograd	2009–10	Serbian SuperLiga	15	0			–		–		15	0
OFK Beograd	Total		25	0			-	-	-	-	25	0
Partizan	2009–10	Serbian SuperLiga	10	0	1	0	0	0	–		11	0
Partizan	2010–11	Serbian SuperLiga	8	0	1	0	5	0	–		14	0
Partizan	2011–12	Serbian SuperLiga	4	0	2	0	1	0	–		7	0
Partizan	2012–13	Serbian SuperLiga	7	0	2	0	0	0	–		9	0
Partizan	2013–14	Serbian SuperLiga	25	1	3	0	4	0	–		32	1
Partizan	2014–15	Serbian SuperLiga	15	0	3	0	12	0	–		30	0
Partizan	Total		69	1	12	0	22	0	-	-	103	1
Inter Baku	2014–15	Azerbaijan Premier League	12	1	4	0	0	0	–		16	1
Inter Baku	2015–16	Azerbaijan Premier League	0	0	0	0	0	0	–		0	0
Inter Baku	2016–17	Azerbaijan Premier League	0	0	0	0	0	0	–		0	0
Inter Baku	Total		12	1	4	0	0	0	-	-	16	1
Gabala (loan)	2015–16	Azerbaijan Premier League	24	0	4	0	11	0	–		39	0
Gabala (loan)	2016–17	Azerbaijan Premier League	11	0	3	1	13	1	–		27	2
Gabala (loan)	Total		35	0	7	1	24	1	-	-	66	2
Gabala	2016–17	Azerbaijan Premier League	12	0	3	0	0	0	–		15	0
Gabala	2017–18	Azerbaijan Premier League	21	0	6	0	4	0	–		31	0
Gabala	2018–19	Azerbaijan Premier League	24	1	5	0	1	0	–		30	1
Gabala	Total		57	1	14	0	5	0	-	-	76	1
Neftçi	2019–20	Azerbaijan Premier League	16	0	2	0	4	0	–		22	0
Neftçi	2020–21	Azerbaijan Premier League	27	3	2	0	2	0	–		31	3
Neftçi	2021–22	Azerbaijan Premier League	25	2	3	1	8	0	–		36	3
Neftçi	2022–23	Azerbaijan Premier League	29	2	4	0	4	0	–		37	2
Neftçi	Total		97	7	11	1	18	0	-	-	126	8
Železničar Pančevo	2023–24	Serbian SuperLiga	36	2	0	0	–		2	0	38	2
Teleoptik	2024–25	Serbian League Belgrade	20	0	–		–		–		20	0
Teleoptik	2025–26	Serbian League Belgrade	20	1	–		–		–		20	1
Teleoptik	Total		40	1	–		–		–		40	1
Career total			429	13	48	2	69	1	2	0	548	16

=== International ===
Serbia national team
Year	Apps	Goals
2010	1	0
Total	1	0

Statistics accurate as of match played 7 April 2010

== Honours ==
Partizan

- Serbian SuperLiga: 2009–10, 2010–11, 2011–12, 2012–13
- Serbian Cup: 2010–11

Gabala

- Azerbaijan Cup: 2018–19

Neftçi

- Azerbaijan Premier League: 2020–21
