= Hugo Basto =

Portuguese footballer

Personal information
- Full name: Hugo Cerqueira Pinto Basto
- Date of birth: 14 May 1993 (age 33)
- Place of birth: Porto, Portugal
- Height: 1.88 m (6 ft 2 in)
- Position: Centre-back

Youth career
- 2002–2003: Amarante
- 2003−2009: Boavista
- 2006–2007: → Pasteleira (loan)
- 2008–2009: → Pasteleira (loan)
- 2009–2012: Porto

Senior career*
Years	Team	Apps	(Gls)
2012–2013	Varzim	30	(1)
2013–2015	Braga B	50	(0)
2015–2018	Arouca	72	(2)
2018–2020	Chaves	19	(0)
2020–2021	Estoril	31	(3)
2021–2022	Neftçi	8	(0)
2022–2024	AEL Limassol	33	(1)
2024–2026	Leixões	27	(0)
2026	→ Trofense (loan)	14	(0)

International career
2011	Portugal U18	5	(1)
2016	Portugal U23	1	(0)
- * Club domestic league appearances and goals as of 17 May 2026

Hugo Cerqueira Pinto Basto (born 14 May 1993) is a Portuguese professional footballer who plays as a central defender.

== Club career ==
Born in Porto, Basto was a youth player at both of his hometown's major clubs, Boavista F.C. and FC Porto. He began his senior career at nearby Varzim S.C. in the third division, playing regularly in his one season. After 18 months at S.C. Braga B in the Segunda Liga, he signed for Primeira Liga side F.C. Arouca in February 2015, on a deal until the summer of 2018.

On 8 March 2015, Basto was sent off in a 3–1 home loss against S.L. Benfica for a foul on Lima. His first top-flight goal came on 19 April to open a 2–0 away victory over fellow strugglers F.C. Penafiel. On 21 May 2017, as the team ended their stay with a 4–2 defeat at G.D. Estoril Praia, he was given a red card after 40 minutes for an aggression towards Bruno Gomes.

Basto was due to return to the top tier with G.D. Chaves in January 2018, but the club accidentally registered Victor Massaia – who went the other way to Arouca – in his place. By the new season, he was down the defensive pecking order.

On 7 August 2020, Basto joined Estoril in division two. A year later, having won promotion as champions, he moved abroad for the first time alongside teammate Harramiz to Azerbaijan's Neftçi PFK, on a two-year contract. He left the latter on 3 June 2022 by mutual agreement.

== International career ==
In March 2016, manager Rui Jorge called up Basto for the under-23 team for a friendly against Mexico, ahead of the Olympics in Brazil. He played the final 14 minutes of the 4–0 win in Angra do Heroísmo.

== Honours ==
Estoril

- Liga Portugal 2: 2020–21
