= Azər Salahlı =

Azerbaijani footballer (born 1994)

Personal information
- Full name: Azər Vəlhəd oğlu Salahlı
- Date of birth: 11 April 1994 (age 32)
- Place of birth: Salyan, Azerbaijan
- Height: 1.83 m (6 ft 0 in)
- Position: Left-back

Team information
- Current team: İmişli
- Number: 19

Youth career
- Keşla

Senior career*
Years	Team	Apps	(Gls)
2012–2016	Keşla	1	(0)
2015–2017	Qarabağ	6	(0)
2016–2017	→ Sumgayit (loan)	28	(1)
2017–2018	Sumgayit	27	(1)
2018–2021	Keşla	49	(4)
2022–2025	Neftçi	77	(3)
2025–	İmişli	32	(2)

International career^{‡}
2010	Azerbaijan U17	3	(0)
2012	Azerbaijan U19	3	(0)
2014–2016	Azerbaijan U21	13	(1)
2017	Azerbaijan U23	5	(0)
2020–	Azerbaijan	24	(1)
Medal record
Men's football
Representing Azerbaijan
Islamic Solidarity Games
Winner	2017 Azerbaijan
- * Club domestic league appearances and goals as of 22 June 2026 ‡ National team caps and goals as of 1 December 2023

Azər Vəlhəd oğlu Salahlı (born 11 April 1994) is an Azerbaijani professional footballer who plays as a left-back for İmişli.

== Club career ==
Salahlı made his debut in the Azerbaijan Premier League for Keşla on 17 May 2014, match against Shuvalan.

== International career ==
He made his international debut for Azerbaijan debut on 10 October 2020 in a UEFA Nations League game against Montenegro.

== Career statistics ==
=== Club ===
As of 28 May 2024

Club	Season	League			Cup		Continental		Total	
Club	Season	Division	Apps	Goals	Apps	Goals	Apps	Goals	Apps	Goals
Keşla	2012-13	Azerbaijan Premier League	0	0	—		—		0	0
Keşla	2013-14	Azerbaijan Premier League	1	0	—		—		1	0
Keşla	2014-15	Azerbaijan Premier League	0	0	—		0	0	0	0
Keşla	Total		1	0	—		0	0	1	0
Qarabağ	2015-16	Azerbaijan Premier League	6	0	1	0	0	0	7	0
Qarabağ	2016-17	Azerbaijan Premier League	—		—		0	0	0	0
Qarabağ	Total		6	0	1	0	0	0	7	0
Sumgayit (loan)	2016-17	Azerbaijan Premier League	28	1	3	0	—		31	1
Sumgayit	2017-18	Azerbaijan Premier League	27	1	5	0	—		32	1
Keşla	2018-19	Azerbaijan Premier League	19	0	—		1 (Note: Appearance(s) in UEFA Europa League)	0	20	0
Keşla	2019-20	Azerbaijan Premier League	5	0	2	0	—		7	0
Keşla	2020-21	Azerbaijan Premier League	25	4	5	0	1	0	31	4
Keşla	2021-22	Azerbaijan Premier League	12	0	1	0	2 (Note: Appearance(s) in UEFA Europa Conference League)	0	15	0
Keşla	Total		61	4	8	0	4	0	73	4
Neftçi	2021-22	Azerbaijan Premier League	13	1	4	0	—		17	1
Neftçi	2022-23	Azerbaijan Premier League	23	0	4	0	4	0	31	0
Neftçi	2023-24	Azerbaijan Premier League	23	2	5	0	4	0	32	2
Neftçi	Total		59	3	13	0	8	0	80	3

=== International ===
Appearances and goals by national team and year
National team	Year	Apps	Goals
Azerbaijan	2020	5	0
Azerbaijan	2021	11	1
Azerbaijan	2022	8	0
Total		24	1

Scores and results list Azerbaijan's goal tally first. The score column indicates the score after each Salahlı goal.

List of international goals scored by Azər Salahlı
No.	Date	Venue	Opponent	Score	Result	Competition	Ref.
1	11 November 2021	Baku Olympic Stadium, Baku, Azerbaijan	Luxembourg	1-2	1-3	2022 FIFA World Cup qualification	

== Honours ==
Qarabağ

- Azerbaijan Premier League (1): 2015–16
- Azerbaijan Cup (1): 2015–16

=== International ===
Azerbaijan U23

- Islamic Solidarity Games: (1) 2017
