= Thallyson (footballer, born 1991) =

Brazilian footballer

Personal information
- Full name: Thallyson Augusto Tavares Dias
- Date of birth: 1 December 1991 (age 34)
- Place of birth: Campo Alegre, Brazil
- Height: 1.75 m (5 ft 9 in)
- Position: Left back

Team information
- Current team: ABC

Youth career
- 2008–2010: CSA
- 2011: ASA

Senior career*
Years	Team	Apps	(Gls)
2012–2014	ASA	42	(1)
2015–2016	Flamengo	0	(0)
2015	→ Fortaleza (loan)	12	(1)
2016	→ Ferroviária (loan)	0	(0)
2016–2017	Ceará	27	(0)
2017	Red Bull Brasil	0	(0)
2017–2018	Vitória	7	(0)
2018	→ Novorizontino (loan)	0	(0)
2018–2019	Sint-Truiden	1	(0)
2019–2020	Guarani	24	(1)
2020–2021	Neftçi Baku	18	(0)
2022	Santo André	18	(0)
2022	ASA	6	(0)
2023	Portuguesa	10	(0)
2023	ASA	13	(2)
2024	Sampaio Corrêa	24	(2)
2025–2026	Porto Vitória	27	(3)
2026–	ABC	4	(0)
- * Club domestic league appearances and goals as of 18 November 2026

Thallyson Augusto Tavares Dias (born 1 December 1991), simply known as Thallyson, is a Brazilian professional footballer who plays as a left back for ABC.

== Club career ==
On 24 July 2020, Thallyson signed a two-year contract with Azerbaijan Premier League side Neftçi PFK. On 30 June 2021, Neftçi announced that Thallyson had left the club after his contract was ended by mutual agreement.
