= Mert Çelik =

Azerbaijani footballer (born 2000)

Personal information
- Date of birth: 10 June 2000 (age 26)
- Place of birth: Istanbul, Turkey
- Height: 1.86 m (6 ft 1 in)
- Position: Centre-back

Team information
- Current team: Sivasspor
- Number: 20

Youth career
- 2011–2013: Galatasaray
- 2013–2019: Başakşehir

Senior career*
Years	Team	Apps	(Gls)
2019–2024	Başakşehir	0	(0)
2020	→ Kırşehir Belediyespor (loan)	3	(1)
2020–2023	→ Neftçi Baku (loan)	42	(2)
2023–2024	→ Bandırmaspor (loan)	3	(0)
2024–2025	Sabail	32	(0)
2025–	Sivasspor	23	(0)

International career^{‡}
2019	Turkey U19	1	(0)
2019	Turkey U20	1	(0)
2020–2022	Azerbaijan U21	7	(1)
2025–	Azerbaijan	1	(0)
- * Club domestic league appearances and goals as of 6 May 2026 ‡ National team caps and goals as of 26 March 2025

Mert Çelik (born 10 June 2000) is a Turkish-born professional footballer who plays as a centre-back for Sivasspor and the Azerbaijan national team.

== Club career ==
Çelik made his debut for Başakşehir in the Turkish Cup match against Hatayspor on 24 January 2019. He has a grandfather from Baku.

On 19 September 2020, Neftçi PFK announced the signing of Çelik on two-year long loan.

On 18 October 2020, he made his debut in the Azerbaijan Premier League for Neftçi Baku match against Sabah.

On 18 July 2025, he signed a one-year contract with Sivasspor.

On 13 November 2025, Çelik was banned from playing for 45 days for his involvement in the 2025 Turkish football betting scandal.
