= İsmayıl Zülfüqarlı =

Azerbaijani footballer (born 2001)

Personal information
- Full name: İsmayıl Ömər oğlu Zülfüqarlı
- Date of birth: 16 April 2001 (age 25)
- Place of birth: Barda, Azerbaijan
- Height: 1.71 m (5 ft 7 in)
- Positions: Right-back; right midfielder

Team information
- Current team: Shafa Baku
- Number: 17

Youth career
- Neftçi

Senior career*
Years	Team	Apps	(Gls)
2019–2025	Neftçi	52	(3)
2023–2025	→ Turan Tovuz (loan)	48	(0)
2025–	Shafa Baku	12	(0)

International career^{‡}
2017	Azerbaijan U17	2	(1)
2019	Azerbaijan U19	3	(0)
2021–2022	Azerbaijan U21	10	(2)
- * Club domestic league appearances and goals as of 25 December 2025 ‡ National team caps and goals as of 3 June 2022

İsmayıl Ömər oğlu Zülfüqarlı (born 16 April 2001) is an Azerbaijani footballer who plays as a winger for Azerbaijan First League club Shafa Baku.

== Club career ==
On 19 August 2019, Zülfüqarlı made his debut in the Azerbaijan Premier League for Neftçi Baku in a match against Sabah.

== Honours ==
Keşla

- Azerbaijan Cup: 2017–18
