= Romain Basque =

French footballer (born 1995)

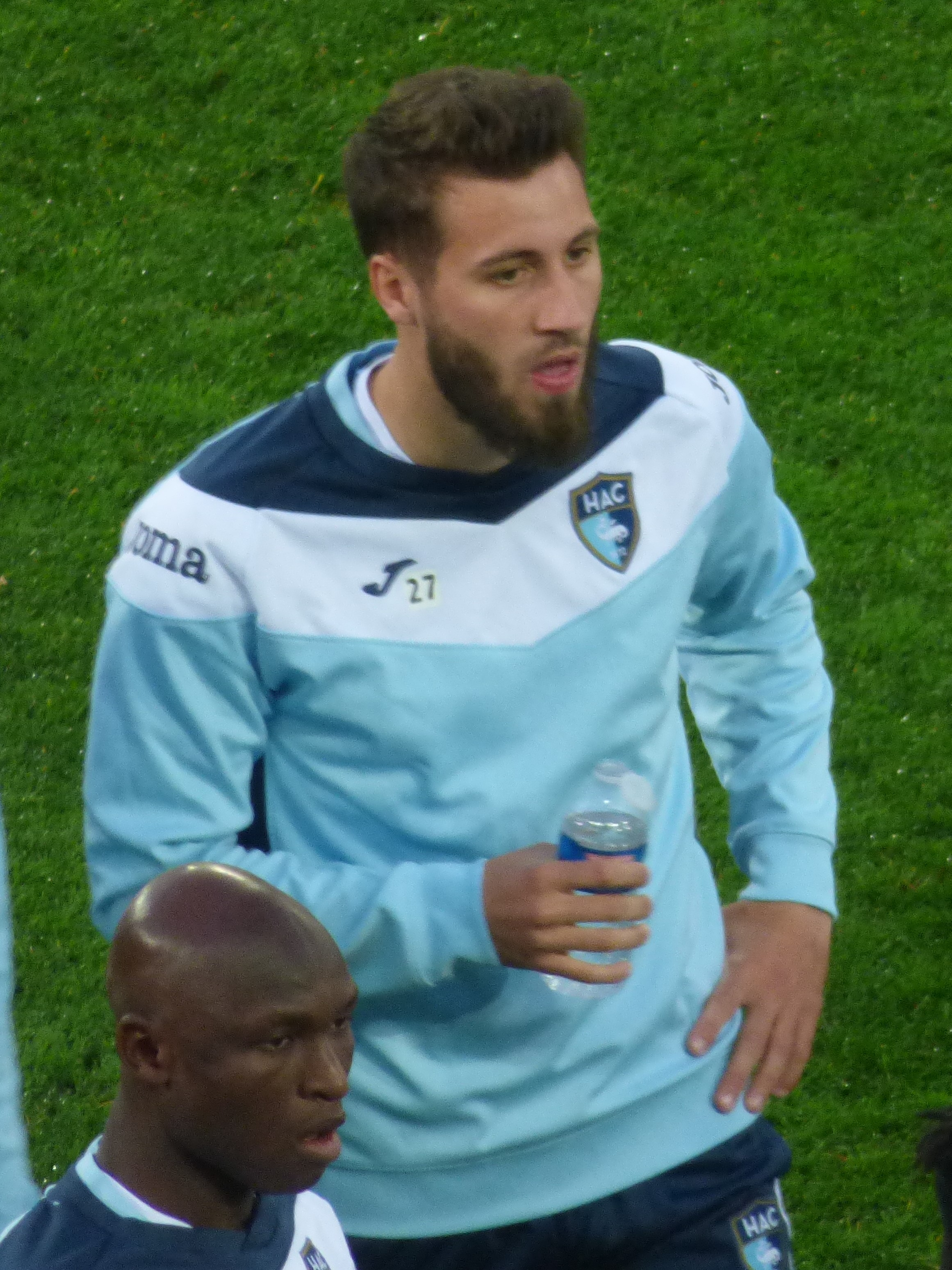
- Basque with Le Havre in 2019

Personal information
- Date of birth: 30 June 1995 (age 31)
- Place of birth: Dieppe, France
- Height: 1.84 m (6 ft 0 in)
- Position: Midfielder

Team information
- Current team: Versailles
- Number: 14

Youth career
- 2012–2013: Rouen
- 2013–2014: Quevilly-Rouen

Senior career*
Years	Team	Apps	(Gls)
2013	Rouen B	11	(0)
2014–2018	Quevilly-Rouen	92	(13)
2014–2017	Quevilly-Rouen B	26	(9)
2018–2021	Le Havre	72	(3)
2018–2020	Le Havre B	8	(2)
2021	Neftçi	6	(0)
2022–2023	Châteauroux	50	(3)
2023–	Versailles	89	(7)
- * Club domestic league appearances and goals as of 23 June 2026

Romain Basque (born 30 June 1995) is a French professional footballer who plays as a midfielder for Ligue 3 club Versailles.

== Career ==
Basque made his professional debut for Quevilly-Rouen in a Ligue 2 1–1 tie with Lorient on 29 July 2017.

On 15 July 2021, Basque signed for Azerbaijan Premier League club Neftçi. He left the club by mutual consent on 29 December 2021.

On 1 January 2022, Basque returned to France, signing for Championnat National side Châteauroux.

== Career statistics ==
As of match played 14 January 2022

Appearances and goals by club, season and competition
Club	Season	League			National Cup		League Cup		Continental		Other		Total	
Club	Season	Division	Apps	Goals	Apps	Goals	Apps	Goals	Apps	Goals	Apps	Goals	Apps	Goals
Rouen B	2012–13	Championnat de France Amateur 2	11	0	—		—		—		—		11	0
Quevilly-Rouen	2013–14	Championnat de France Amateur	1	0	0	0	—		—		—		1	0
Quevilly-Rouen	2015–16	Championnat de France Amateur	24	3	1	0	—		—		—		25	3
Quevilly-Rouen	2016–17	Championnat National	31	7	2	0	—		—		—		33	7
Quevilly-Rouen	2017–18	Ligue 2	36	3	1	0	0	0	—		—		37	3
Quevilly-Rouen	Total		92	13	4	0	0	0	—		—		96	13
Quevilly-Rouen B	2014–15	Championnat de France Amateur 2	25	8	—		—		—		—		25	8
Quevilly-Rouen B	2017–18	Championnat National 3	1	1	—		—		—		—		1	1
Quevilly-Rouen B	Total		26	9	—		—		—		—		26	9
Le Havre	2018–19	Ligue 2	22	0	2	0	4	0	—		—		28	0
Le Havre	2019–20	Ligue 2	15	0	1	1	1	0	—		—		17	1
Le Havre	2020–21	Ligue 2	35	3	0	0	—		—		—		35	3
Le Havre	Total		72	3	3	1	5	0	—		—		80	4
Le Havre B	2018–19	Championnat National 2	6	2	—		—		—		—		6	2
Le Havre B	2019–20	Championnat National 3	2	0	—		—		—		—		2	0
Le Havre B	Total		8	2	—		—		—		—		8	2
Neftçi	2021–22	Azerbaijan Premier League	6	0	0	0	—		6 (Note: Two appearances in the UEFA Champions League, two appearances in the UEFA Europa League and two appearances in the UEFA Europa Conference League)	0	—		12	0
Châteauroux	2021–22	Championnat National	2	0	0	0	—		—		—		2	0
Career total			217	27	7	1	5	0	6	0	0	0	235	28
