= Mamadou Kané (footballer, born 1997) =

Guinean footballer

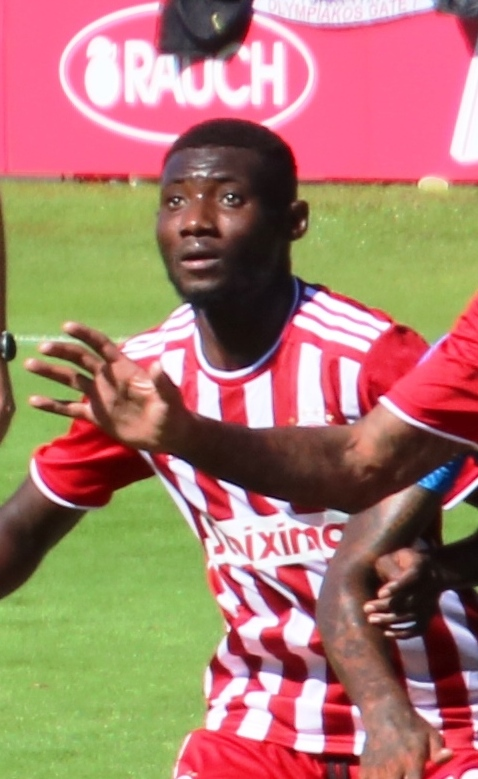
- Kané in 2022

Personal information
- Date of birth: 22 January 1997 (age 29)
- Place of birth: Conakry, Guinea
- Height: 1.73 m (5 ft 8 in)
- Position: Midfielder

Team information
- Current team: Araz-Naxçıvan

Youth career
- 2014–2016: Satellite
- 2016–2017: Kaloum

Senior career*
Years	Team	Apps	(Gls)
2017–2019	Gangan		
2019–2021	Neftçi	50	(0)
2021–2023	Olympiacos	5	(0)
2021–2022	→ Neftçi (loan)	11	(1)
2022	Olympiacos B	2	(1)
2022–2023	→ Pafos (loan)	32	(3)
2023–2026	Pafos	15	(0)
2024	→ Rodina Moscow (loan)	9	(0)
2025	→ Auda (loan)	13	(0)
2025–2026	→ Ethnikos Achna (loan)	10	(0)
2026–	Araz-Naxçıvan	0	(0)

International career^{‡}
2017	Guinea U20	7	(0)
2020–2024	Guinea	19	(5)
- * Club domestic league appearances and goals as of 14 June 2026 ‡ National team caps and goals as of 25 March 2024

Mamadou Kané (born 22 January 1997) is a Guinean professional footballer who plays as a midfielder for Araz-Naxçıvan.

== Club career ==
=== Neftçi ===
Kané began his career with Gangan before signing with Azerbaijan Premier League side Neftçi on 1 January 2019. He made his professional debut with Neftçi in a 1–0 league win over Qarabağ FK on 3 February 2019. Kané was named the player of the year in Azerbaijan by the famous Ghanaian football player Michael Essien in the 2019–20 season with his successful performance in Neftçi.

=== Olympiacos ===
On 28 August 2021, Olympiacos officially announced Mamadou Kané for a transfer fee in the range of €300,000, who signed a five-year contract with the Greek giants.

=== Loan to Neftçi ===
On 29 August 2021, Olympiacos loaned Kané to Neftçi for one season.

=== Return to Olympiacos ===
On 26 January 2022, Kané left Neftçi and returned to Olympiacos.

=== Pafos ===
On 23 August 2022, Kané joined Cypriot club Pafos on a one-year loan deal. On 13 July 2023, Pafos announced the permanent signing of Kané to a three-year contract.

=== Araz-Naxçıvan ===
On 23 July 2026, Azerbaijan Premier League club Araz-Naxçıvan announced the signing of Kané to a one-year contract.

== International career ==
Kané made his debut with the Guinea national team in a 1–1 2020 African Nations Championship draw with Chad on 15 November 2020. Kané scored his first goal for Guinea against Namibia on 28 March 2021.

== Career statistics ==
=== Club ===
As of match played 5 June 2023

Appearances and goals by club, season and competition
Club	Season	League			National cup		Continental		Other		Total	
Club	Season	Division	Apps	Goals	Apps	Goals	Apps	Goals	Apps	Goals	Apps	Goals
Neftçi	2018–19	Azerbaijan Premier League	9	0	0	0	0 (Note: Appearances in the UEFA Europa League)	0	–		9	0
Neftçi	2019–20	Azerbaijan Premier League	16	0	2	0	5	0	–		23	0
Neftçi	2020–21	Azerbaijan Premier League	25	0	2	0	2	0	–		29	0
Neftçi	Total		50	0	4	0	7	0	0	0	61	0
Olympiacos	2021–22	Super League Greece	5	0	1	0	0	0	–		6	0
Olympiacos	2022–23	Super League Greece	0	0	0	0	3	0	—		3	0
Olympiacos	Total		5	0	1	0	3	0	0	0	9	0
Olympiacos B	2021–22	Super League Greece 2	2	1	0	0	0	0	–		2	1
Neftçi (loan)	2021–22	Azerbaijan Premier League	11	1	0	0	8	0	–		19	1
Pafos (loan)	2022–23	Cypriot First Division	32	3	5	0	–		–		37	3
Career total			102	5	9	0	18	0	0	0	124	5

== International ==
As of match played 9 June 2022

Appearances and goals by national team and year
National team	Year	Apps	Goals
Guinea	2020	1	0
Guinea	2021	11	1
Guinea	2022	5	1
Guinea	2024	1	2
Total		18	4

=== International goals ===
No.	Date	Venue	Opponent	Score	Result	Competition
1.	28 March 2021	Sam Nujoma Stadium, Windhoek, Namibia	Namibia	1–0	1–2	2021 Africa Cup of Nations qualification
2.	21 March 2024	King Abdullah Sports City, Jeddah, Saudi Arabia	Vanuatu	4–0	6–0	2024 FIFA Series
3.	21 March 2024	King Abdullah Sports City, Jeddah, Saudi Arabia	Vanuatu	5–0	6–0	2024 FIFA Series
4.	25 March 2024	King Abdullah Sports City, Jeddah, Saudi Arabia	Bermuda	5–1	5–1	2024 FIFA Series

== Honours ==
Neftçi

- Azerbaijan Premier League: 2020–21

Olympiacos

- Super League Greece: 2021–22
