= Jorge Correa =

Argentine footballer (born 1993)

Personal information
- Full name: Jorge Iván Correa
- Date of birth: 4 April 1993 (age 33)
- Place of birth: San Martín, Argentina
- Height: 1.70 m (5 ft 7 in)
- Positions: Winger; attacking midfielder

Team information
- Current team: Estudiantes

Youth career
- Vélez Sarsfield

Senior career*
Years	Team	Apps	(Gls)
2010–2018	Vélez Sarsfield	55	(6)
2012–2013	→ Defensores de Belgrano (loan)	14	(1)
2018–2021	Marítimo	102	(6)
2021–2022	Neftçi	2	(0)
2022	Volos	10	(1)
2022–2023	Oriente Petrolero	30	(6)
2023–2024	Torreense	31	(3)
2024	Malut United	17	(4)
2025–	Estudiantes	45	(4)
- * Club domestic league appearances and goals as of 16:11, 28 April 2026 (UTC)

Jorge Iván Correa (born 4 April 1993) is an Argentine professional footballer who plays as a winger or attacking midfielder for Primera Nacional club Estudiantes.

== Career ==
Correa played youth football and debuted professionally with Vélez Sarsfield, entering the field in a 1–1 draw with Godoy Cruz in the 2011 Apertura.

For the 2012–13 season, the midfielder was loaned to Defensores de Belgrano in the Primera B Metropolitana (Argentine third division), returning to Vélez the following season. Upon José Oscar Flores taking up coaching of the first team, Correa played more first team football. Although he was mainly used as a substitute for Héctor Canteros, Correa played 16 games (scoring three goals) in the 2014 Final and another 8 games (scoring three goals, including a double against Nacional in the round of 16) in the 2014 Copa Libertadores. He also entered the field in Vélez Sarsfield's victory over Arsenal de Sarandí in the 2013 Supercopa Argentina.

After Canteros' departure, Correa started the 2014 Torneo de Transición in the starting eleven of the team and scored once in Vélez' defeat to Boca Juniors in La Bombonera. However, in the 10th fixture against Gimnasia y Esgrima La Plata he suffered a knee cruciate ligament injury that left him out of the squad for the remainder of the tournament. He returned to the first team in the 8th fixture of the 2015 Argentine Primera División, entering the field in a 2–1 victory over Arsenal de Sarandí. However, only three games later, he suffered again the same injury in his other knee, on the eleventh minute of the 3–0 victory against La Emilia for the 2014–15 Copa Argentina.

After recovering for a second time, he renewed his contract with Vélez and returned to the first team. He scored his first goal since his return in a 3–2 victory against Belgrano, for the 8th fixture of the 2016 Argentine Primera División.

On 17 September 2021, Correa signed a two-year contract with Neftçi in Azerbaijan. On 22 January 2022, Correa left Neftçi by mutual consent.

On 25 January 2022, Correa signed a one-and-a-half-year contract with Super League Greece club Volos.

On 29 June 2022, he signed for Bolivian Primera División side Oriente Petrolero.

On 13 July 2023, Correa returned to Portugal, joining Liga Portugal 2 club Torreense.

== Honours ==
Vélez Sarsfield

- Supercopa Argentina: 2013
