= Guilherme Pato =

Brazilian footballer (born 2001)

Personal information
- Full name: Guilherme Nunes Rodrigues
- Date of birth: 17 February 2001 (age 25)
- Place of birth: Quaraí, Brazil
- Height: 1.64 m (5 ft 5 in)
- Position: Forward

Team information
- Current team: CRB
- Number: 11

Youth career
- Internacional

Senior career*
Years	Team	Apps	(Gls)
2020–2021	Internacional	6	(1)
2020–2021	→ Ponte Preta (loan)	33	(4)
2021	→ Cuiabá (loan)	21	(2)
2022–2023	Neftchi Baku	26	(2)
2023–2024	Figueirense	61	(13)
2025	Mirassol	6	(1)
2025	América Mineiro	3	(0)
2026–	CRB	21	(1)
- * Club domestic league appearances and goals as of 16 November 2026

Guilherme Nunes Rodrigues (born 17 February 2001), known as Guilherme Pato, is a Brazilian professional footballer who plays as a forward for CRB.

== Club career ==
Pato made his professional debut with Internacional in a 0-0 Campeonato Gaúcho tie with Ypiranga on 1 February 2020.

On 21 January 2022, Pato joined the Azerbaijani club Neftchi Baku on a contract until the summer of 2024. On 15 February 2023, Pato left Neftchi Baku by mutual agreement.

== Career statistics ==
As of 29 October 2021.

Club	Season	League			State League		Cup		Continental		Other		Total	
Club	Season	Division	Apps	Goals	Apps	Goals	Apps	Goals	Apps	Goals	Apps	Goals	Apps	Goals
Internacional	2020	Série A	0	0	3	0	0	0	0	0	—		3	0
Internacional	2021	Série A	0	0	3	1	0	0	—		—		3	1
Internacional	Total		0	0	6	1	0	0	0	0	—		6	1
Ponte Preta (loan)	2020	Série B	31	4	—		2	0	—		—		33	4
Cuiabá (loan)	2021	Série A	7	0	12	2	1	0	—		1 (Note: Appearance(s) in Copa Verde)	0	21	2
Career total			38	4	18	3	3	0	0	0	1	0	60	7

== Honours ==
Cuiabá

- Campeonato Mato-Grossense: 2021
