= Harramiz =

São Toméan footballer (born 1990)

Personal information
- Full name: Harramiz Quieta Ferreira Soares
- Date of birth: 3 August 1990 (age 36)
- Place of birth: São Tomé, São Tomé and Príncipe
- Height: 1.80 m (5 ft 11 in)
- Positions: Winger; forward

Team information
- Current team: Alcochetense

Youth career
- 2004–2007: Seixal
- 2007–2009: Real Massamá

Senior career*
Years	Team	Apps	(Gls)
2009–2010	O Elvas		
2010–2011	Aljustrelense	27	(6)
2011–2013	União Montemor	59	(29)
2013–2016	Benfica B	18	(3)
2014–2016	→ Farense (loan)	72	(13)
2016–2017	Covilhã	40	(10)
2017–2018	Académica	16	(1)
2018	Tondela	2	(0)
2018–2019	Mafra	31	(10)
2019–2020	Leixões	25	(8)
2020–2021	Estoril	23	(4)
2021–2022	Neftçi	3	(0)
2022–2023	Farense	22	(0)
2023	Torreense	12	(0)
2023	Länk Vilaverdense	12	(1)
2024–2025	Alverca	11	(2)
2025	→ 1º Dezembro (loan)	11	(1)
2025–2026	1º Dezembro	26	(0)
2026–	Alcochetense	0	(0)

International career
2015–2023	São Tomé and Príncipe	17	(2)
- * Club domestic league appearances and goals as of 7 May 2026

Harramiz Quieta Ferreira Soares (born 3 August 1990), known simply as Harramiz, is a Santoméan professional footballer who plays as a winger or forward for Campeonato de Portugal club Alcochetense.

He spent most of his career in Portugal's second tier, playing over 200 games across ten clubs. He also appeared in two Primeira Liga matches for Tondela in 2018.

== Club career ==
Harramiz was born in São Tomé. In June 2013, after starting his senior career in Portugal's lower leagues, he moved straight into the Primeira Liga when he joined S.L. Benfica, for a fee of €15,000.

Harramiz was initially assigned to the B team in the Segunda Liga. On 10 August 2013, aged 23, he played his first game as a professional, featuring the full 90 minutes and being booked in a 0–0 away draw against C.D. Trofense. Eleven days later, in another away fixture, he scored his first league goal, contributing to a 2–2 draw with S.C. Beira-Mar.

On 31 August 2014, Harramiz was loaned to S.C. Farense in a season-long deal, Six of his eight goals came during the last month of competition, and the Algarve team finally ranked in 11th place.

In the following years, Harramiz continued to compete in the second division, with S.C. Covilhã and Académica de Coimbra. On 31 January 2018, he returned to the top flight after signing with C.D. Tondela until 30 June, and he made his debut in the competition on 26 February by coming on as a late substitute in a 1–0 loss at S.C. Braga.

On 31 July 2018, Harramiz returned to division two with C.D. Mafra. Having scored a joint personal best ten goals in his one season, he moved on to Leixões SC.

Harramiz cut his ties with Leixões on 1 October 2020 and made his way to G.D. Estoril Praia; he had played against that club four days earlier. The following 27 January, he scored away to top-tier C.S. Marítimo in a 3–1 extra time win as his side reached the semi-finals of the Taça de Portugal.

In July 2021, after winning the second division with Estoril, Harramiz left Portuguese football for the first time to sign for Neftçi PFK in Azerbaijan; he was joined in Baku by teammate Hugo Basto. On 21 January 2022, he left after making 11 appearances.

Harramiz returned to the Portuguese second tier subsequently, starting with Farense then moving to S.C.U. Torreense in January 2023 and Länk FC Vilaverdense in the summer. On 28 December 2023, he and his teammate Yannick Semedo terminated their contracts at the latter due to allegedly unpaid wages.

In February 2024, Harramiz joined Liga 3 club F.C. Alverca.

== International career ==
Harramiz earned his first cap for São Tomé and Príncipe on 5 September 2015, starting in a 0–3 home loss to Morocco for the 2017 Africa Cup of Nations qualifiers.

== Career statistics ==
=== Club ===
As of 23 May 2015

Club	Season	League		National cup		League cup		Continental		Total	
Club	Season	Apps	Goals	Apps	Goals	Apps	Goals	Apps	Goals	Apps	Goals
Benfica B	2013–14	18	3	—		—		—		18	3
Farense	2014–15	33	8	0	0	0	0	—		33	8
Career Total		51	11	0	0	0	0	—		51	11

=== International goals ===
As of 16 November 2020 (São Tomé and Príncipe score listed first, score column indicates score after each Harramiz goal)

No	Date	Venue	Opponent	Score	Result	Competition
1.	26 March 2017	Mahamasina Municipal Stadium, Antananarivo, Madagascar	Madagascar	1–2	2–3	2019 Africa Cup of Nations qualification
2.	16 November 2020	Nelson Mandela Bay Stadium, Port Elizabeth, South Africa	South Africa	2–2	2–4	2021 Africa Cup of Nations qualification

== Honours ==
Estoril

- Liga Portugal 2: 2020–21
