= Fahmin Muradbayli =

Azerbaijani footballer (born 1996)

Personal information
- Full name: Fahmin Surkhay oglu Muradbayli
- Date of birth: 16 March 1996 (age 30)
- Place of birth: Baku, Azerbaijan
- Height: 1.75 m (5 ft 9 in)
- Position: Right winger

Youth career
- Neftçi Baku

Senior career*
Years	Team	Apps	(Gls)
2013–2022	Neftçi Baku	72	(6)
2018–2020	→ Sabail (loan)	57	(6)
2022	→ Shamakhi (loan)	7	(0)

International career^{‡}
2012	Azerbaijan U17	2	(0)
2013–2015	Azerbaijan U19	6	(1)
2015–2018	Azerbaijan U21	12	(1)
Medal record
Men's football
Representing Azerbaijan
Islamic Solidarity Games
Winner	2017 Azerbaijan
- * Club domestic league appearances and goals as of 25 July 2023 ‡ National team caps and goals as of 15 September 2020

Fahmin Muradbayli (Azerbaijani: Fəhmin Surxay oğlu Muradbəyli; born 16 March 1996) is an Azerbaijani footballer who plays as a right winger. He has represented the country at the youth international level.

== Club career ==
On 22 May 2015, Muradbayli made his debut in the Azerbaijan Premier League for Neftçi Baku match against Baku.

== Honours ==
=== Club ===
Neftçi

- Azerbaijan Cup: 2013–14

=== International ===
Azerbaijan U23

- Islamic Solidarity Games: (1) 2017
