= Yusuf Lawal =

Nigerian footballer

Personal information
- Date of birth: 23 March 1998 (age 28)
- Place of birth: Lagos, Nigeria
- Height: 1.75 m (5 ft 9 in)
- Position: Left winger

Youth career
- 2011–2017: 36 Lion FC

Senior career*
| Years | Team | Apps | (Gls) |
| 2017–2020 | Lokeren | 22 | (0) |
| 2020–2022 | Neftçi Baku | 69 | (4) |
| 2023–2024 | Arouca | 26 | (0) |
| 2024–2025 | Zira | 9 | (0) |
| 2025 | Al-Karkh | 1 | (0) |
- * Club domestic league appearances and goals as of 20 September 2025

Yusuf Lawal (born 23 March 1998), nicknamed Obagol, is a Nigerian professional footballer who plays as a left winger.

== Club career ==
Lawal has been a youth product of 36 Lion FC in Lagos since 2011, and gained the nickname Obagoal because of the similarity of his play to Obafemi Martins. He signed a 3+1 year contract with Lokeren in the summer of 2017. Lawal made his professional debut for Lokeren in a 3-0 Belgian First Division A win over Eupen on 14 April 2018.

On 16 July 2020, Lawal signed a 2+1 year contract with Azerbaijan Premier League side Neftçi PFK. Yusuf Lawal scored his last goal against Sabah FK in a match played in Azerbaijan Premier League on August 20, 2022.

On 10 September 2024, Lawal returned to the Azerbaijan Premier League, signing a 2+1 year contract with Zira.

== International career ==
Lawal was called up to a training camp for the Nigeria national under-23 football team in preparation for the 2015 Africa U-23 Cup of Nations, but did not make the final squad.
