= 2023–24 Sabail FK season =

Sabail
2023-24 season
- Chairman: Rashad Abdullayev
- Manager: Shahin Diniyev
- Stadium: ASCO Arena
- Premier League: 7th
- Azerbaijan Cup: Quarterfinal vs Zira
- Top goalscorer: League: Alexandre Ramalingom (15); All: Alexandre Ramalingom (17)
Home colours	Away colours

The Sabail FK 2023–24 season was Sabail's seventh Azerbaijan Premier League season, and their eighth season in existence. They will compete in the Premier League and the Azerbaijan Cup.

== Season events ==
On 5 June, Sabail announced the signing of Yusif Nabiyev from Kapaz on a free transfer. The following day, 6 June, Suleyman Ahmadov joined from Sumgayit.

On 14 June, Sabail announced the signing of Səlahət Ağayev from Gabala.

On 22 June, Sabail announced the signing of Amil Yunanov from Shamakhi.

On 4 July, Sabail announced the signing of Nir Bardea from Maccabi Bnei Reineh and Yadin Lugasi from Hapoel Ironi Kiryat Shmona. The following day, 5 July, Sabail announced the signing of Paná from Académico de Viseu and Pedro Nuno from Adanaspor.

On 12 July, Sabail announced the signing of Alexandre Ramalingom from Sedan.

On 26 July, Sabail announced the signing of Adi Mehremić from İstanbulspor.

On 7 August, Sabail announced the signing of Anass Najah from Telstar.

On 28 September, Sabail announced the signing of free-agent Sylvain Deslandes.

On 19 January, Sabail announced the signing of Madi Queta from Mafra.

On 21 January, Sabail announced the signing of Ayub Masika from Nanjing City.

On 2 February, Sabail announced the signing of Soulyman Allouch from VVV-Venlo.

== Squad ==
As of match played 25 May 2024

No.	Name	Nationality	Position	Date of birth (age)	Signed from	Signed in	Contract ends	Apps.	Goals
Goalkeepers
1	Səlahət Ağayev	(Azerbaijan)	GK	4 January 1991 (aged 33)	Gabala	2023		32	0
12	Huseynali Guliyev	(Azerbaijan)	GK	11 August 1999 (aged 24)	Sumgayit	2022		22	0
25	Sadiq Mammadzada	(Azerbaijan)	GK	29 October 2006 (aged 17)	Academy	2022		0	0
Defenders
3	Sylvain Deslandes	(France)	DF	25 April 1997 (aged 27)	Unattached	2023		17	0
4	Adi Mehremić	(Bosnia and Herzegovina)	DF	26 April 1992 (aged 32)	İstanbulspor	2023		35	2
5	Adil Naghiyev	(Azerbaijan)	DF	11 September 1995 (aged 28)	Sumgayit	2019		110	3
6	Jabir Amirli	(Azerbaijan)	DF	6 January 1997 (aged 27)	Neftçi	2021		82	1
15	Vugar Hasanov	(Azerbaijan)	DF	5 December 1997 (aged 26)	Kapaz	2022		19	0
16	Emin Rustamov	(Azerbaijan)	DF	21 June 2004 (aged 19)	Academy	2022		1	0
55	Nir Bardea	(Israel)	DF	25 January 1996 (aged 28)	Maccabi Bnei Reineh	2023		28	2
74	Yusif Nabiyev	(Azerbaijan)	DF	3 September 1997 (aged 26)	Kapaz	2023		37	5
Midfielders
11	Rufat Abdullazade	(Azerbaijan)	MF	17 January 2001 (aged 23)	Sumgayit	2023		38	8
17	Rafael Maharramli	(Azerbaijan)	MF	1 October 1999 (aged 24)	Shamakhi	2022		51	1
18	Suleyman Ahmadov	(Azerbaijan)	MF	25 November 1999 (aged 24)	Sumgayit	2023		12	0
19	Samir Abdullayev	(Azerbaijan)	MF	24 April 2002 (aged 22)	Shamakhi	2022		50	2
21	Anass Najah	(Netherlands)	MF	16 September 1997 (aged 26)	Telstar	2023		36	0
27	Pedro Nuno	(Portugal)	MF	13 January 1995 (aged 29)	Adanaspor	2023		37	11
34	Taleh Qarayev	(Azerbaijan)	MF	27 October 2003 (aged 20)	Gabala	2022		3	1
38	Zeynaddin Abdurahmanov	(Azerbaijan)	MF	23 September 2002 (aged 21)	Academy	2021		2	0
42	Adam Topalov	(Azerbaijan)	MF	25 June 2005 (aged 18)	Academy	2023		1	0
44	Yadin Lugasi	(Israel)	MF	4 April 1999 (aged 25)	Hapoel Ironi Kiryat Shmona	2023		37	3
62	Zaman Zamanlı	(Azerbaijan)	MF	22 July 2005 (aged 18)	Academy	2023		1	0
88	Paná	(Angola)	MF	9 March 1992 (aged 32)	Académico de Viseu	2023		39	1
Forwards
7	Madi Queta	(Guinea-Bissau)	FW	21 October 1998 (aged 25)	Mafra	2024		19	0
8	Bahadur Haziyev	(Azerbaijan)	FW	26 March 1999 (aged 25)	Shamakhi	2023		30	1
9	Alexandre Ramalingom	(Madagascar)	FW	17 March 1993 (aged 31)	Sedan	2023		38	17
10	Aghabala Ramazanov	(Azerbaijan)	FW	20 January 1993 (aged 31)	Zira	2022		80	20
14	Soulyman Allouch	(Netherlands)	FW	26 January 2002 (aged 22)	VVV-Venlo	2024		16	2
48	Ayaz Mikayılov	(Azerbaijan)	FW	23 March 2004 (aged 20)	Academy	2023		2	0
67	İftixar İbrahimov	(Azerbaijan)	FW	26 January 2005 (aged 19)	Academy	2023		1	0
77	Ayub Masika	(Kenya)	FW	10 September 1992 (aged 31)	Nanjing City	2024	2024	16	0
99	David Gomis	(Guinea-Bissau)	FW	21 December 1992 (aged 31)	Pau	2023		35	5
Out on loan
9	Amil Yunanov	(Azerbaijan)	FW	6 January 1993 (aged 31)	Shamakhi	2023		34	12
Left during the season
77	Adilkhan Garahmadov	(Azerbaijan)	MF	5 June 2001 (aged 22)	Academy	2018		66	2

== Transfers ==
=== In ===
Date	Position	Nationality	Name	From	Fee	Ref.
5 June 2023	DF	(Azerbaijan)	Yusif Nabiyev	Kapaz	Free	
6 June 2023	MF	(Azerbaijan)	Suleyman Ahmadov	Sumgayit	Free	
14 June 2023	GK	(Azerbaijan)	Səlahət Ağayev	Gabala	Free	
22 June 2023	MF	(Azerbaijan)	Coşqun Diniyev	Zira	Free	
22 June 2023	FW	(Azerbaijan)	Amil Yunanov	Shamakhi	Undisclosed	
1 July 2023	MF	(Azerbaijan)	Rufat Abdullazade	Sumgayit	Undisclosed	
4 July 2023	DF	(Israel)	Nir Bardea	Maccabi Bnei Reineh	Undisclosed	
4 July 2023	MF	(Israel)	Yadin Lugasi	Hapoel Ironi Kiryat Shmona	Undisclosed	
5 July 2023	MF	(Angola)	Paná	Académico de Viseu	Undisclosed	
5 July 2023	MF	(Portugal)	Pedro Nuno	Adanaspor	Undisclosed	
12 July 2023	FW	(Madagascar)	Alexandre Ramalingom	Sedan	Undisclosed	
26 July 2023	DF	(Bosnia and Herzegovina)	Adi Mehremić	İstanbulspor	Undisclosed	
7 August 2023	MF	(Netherlands)	Anass Najah	Telstar	Undisclosed	
28 September 2023	DF	(France)	Sylvain Deslandes	Unattached	Free	
19 January 2024	FW	(Guinea-Bissau)	Madi Queta	Mafra	Undisclosed	
21 January 2024	FW	(Kenya)	Ayub Masika	Nanjing City	Undisclosed	
2 February 2024	FW	(Netherlands)	Soulyman Allouch	VVV-Venlo	Undisclosed	

=== Out ===
Date	Position	Nationality	Name	To	Fee	Ref.
23 June 2023	MF	(Azerbaijan)	Coşqun Diniyev	Ümraniyespor	Undisclosed	
1 September 2023	MF	(Azerbaijan)	Adilkhan Garahmadov	Iravan	Undisclosed	

=== Loans out ===
Date from	Position	Nationality	Name	To	Date to	Ref.
13 July 2023	MF	(Azerbaijan)	Elmir Taghiyev	Kapaz	End of season	
5 January 2024	FW	(Azerbaijan)	Amil Yunanov	Kapaz	End of season	

=== Released ===
Date	Position	Nationality	Name	Joined	Date	Ref
23 June 2023	MF	(Azerbaijan)	Rahid Amirguliyev	Retired		

== Friendlies ==
12 January 2024	Sabail	0 – 0	Universitatea Cluj	Belek, Turkey
18:00 AZT (UTC+4)		Report		Stadium: IS Santai Hotel

15 January 2024	Fakel Voronezh	1 – 0	Sabail	Belek, Turkey
18:00 AZT (UTC+4)	Moțpan 69'	Report		Stadium: Miracle Resort Hotel

== Competitions ==
=== Overview ===
Competition	First match	Last match	Starting round	Final position	Record							
Competition	First match	Last match	Starting round	Final position	Pld	W	D	L	GF	GA	GD	Win %
Premier League	5 August 2023	25 May 2024	Matchday 1	7th	36	11	9	16	50	60	−10	30.56
Azerbaijan Cup	28 November 2023	8 February 2024	Second Round	Quarterfinal	4	2	0	2	14	5	+9	50.00
Total					40	13	9	18	64	65	−1	32.50

Last updated: 18 May 2024
Source: Competitions

=== Premier League ===
==== Results summary ====
Overall								Home						Away					
Pld	W	D	L	GF	GA	GD	Pts	W	D	L	GF	GA	GD	W	D	L	GF	GA	GD
36	11	9	16	50	60	−10	42	5	6	7	25	29	−4	6	3	9	25	31	−6

Last updated: 25 May 2024.
Source: See Results

==== Results by round ====
Round	1	2	3	4	5	6	7	8	9	10	11	12	13	14	15	16	17	18	19	20	21	22	23	24	25	26	27	28	29	30	31	32	33	34	35	36
Ground	H	A	H	A	H	A	H	H	A	H	A	H	A	H	A	A	H	A	H	A	H	A	H	H	A	H	A	H	A	H	A	A	H	A	H	A
Result	L	D	L	W	W	W	W	D	W	L	D	W	L	D	D	L	W	L	D	L	L	W	D	W	W	L	L	D	L	D	W	L	L	L	L	L
Position	8	9	9	7	5	3	3	3	3	3	4	3	4	4	4	4	3	4	5	5	7	5	5	5	2	5	6	6	7	7	6	6	6	7	7	7

Updated to match(es) played on 25 May 2024. Source: See Results
A = Away; H = Home; W = Win; D = Draw; L = Loss

==== Results ====
5 August 2023 1	Sabail	1–4	Sumgayit	Bayil
18:30 AZT (UTC+4)	Bardea (yellow card) 34'; Gomis (yellow card) 51' (goal) 62'; Nuno (yellow card) 69'	Report	Muradov 27'; Sorga 67' (pen.); Guliyev 69'; Abdullazade (yellow card) 69' (goal) 76'; Mustafayev (yellow card) 74'	Stadium: Bayil Arena; Referee: Elcin Masiyev

14 August 2023 2	Neftçi	1–1	Sabail	Baku
20:00 AZT (UTC+4)	Saief (yellow card) 40' (goal) 82' (pen.); Qarayev (yellow card) 74'; Zulfugarli (yellow card) 90+3'	Report	Lugasi (yellow card) 32'; Nuno 34' (yellow card) 74'; Mehremić (yellow card) 80'; Ahmadov (yellow card) 80'; Ağayev (yellow card) 85'	Stadium: Neftçi Arena; Referee: Rauf Jabarov

19 August 2023 3	Sabail	1–2	Zira	Bayil
20:00 AZT (UTC+4)	Lugasi 31'; Ramazanov (yellow card) 64'; Amirli (yellow card) 78'	Report	Soumah 16'; Alıyev (yellow card) 70'; Filipe 82'; Azadov (yellow card) 90+3'	Stadium: Bayil Arena; Referee: Ingilab Mammadov

26 August 2023 4	Turan Tovuz	1–3	Sabail	Tovuz
17:00 AZT (UTC+4)	Miller 84'	Report	Ramalingom 5'; Gomis (yellow card) 44'; Nabiyev 62'; Ramazanov 90'	Stadium: City Stadium; Referee: Tural Qurbanov

3 September 2023 5	Sabail	2–1	Qarabağ	Baku
19:30 AZT (UTC+4)	Ramalingom 17' (pen.), 42'; Nabiyev (yellow card) 51'; Ağayev (yellow card) 75'; Mehremić (yellow card) 84'	Report	Keyta 3'; Akhundzade (yellow card) 66'; Medina (yellow card) 85'; Gugeshashvili (yellow card) 90+8'	Stadium: Bayil Arena; Referee: Kamranbay Rahimov

16 September 2023 6	Kapaz	0–3	Sabail	Ganja
16:00 AZT (UTC+4)	Onanuga (yellow card) 76'	Report	Nabiyev 2'; Paná 16'; Bardea (yellow card) 43'; Ramalingom 54'	Stadium: City Stadium; Referee: Ravan Hamzazada

24 September 2023 7	Sabail	1–0	Araz-Naxçıvan	Baku
19:30 AZT (UTC+4)	Nuno 45+1' (pen.) (yellow card) 90+3'; Haziyev (yellow card) 85'; Najah (yellow card) 90+6'	Report	Bayramli (yellow card) 63'; Wanderson (yellow card) 90+3'	Stadium: Bayil Arena; Referee: Raad Ahmadov

30 September 2023 8	Sabail	2–2	Sabah	Baku
18:00 AZT (UTC+4)	Nabiyev 29' (yellow card) 65'; Ramazanov (yellow card) 65'; Najah (yellow card) 71'; Nuno (yellow card) 80'; Mehremić 87'	Report	Irazabal (yellow card) 27'; Apeh 41' (pen.); Parris (yellow card) 65'; Nuriyev 84'; Guliyev (yellow card) 90+1'; Letić (yellow card) 90+4' (red card) 90+4'	Stadium: Bayil Arena; Referee: Javid Jalilov

7 October 2023 9	Gabala	1–0	Sabail	Qabala
16:00 AZT (UTC+4)	Safarov (yellow card) 70'; Isaiah (yellow card) 80'	Report	Ahmadov (yellow card) 31'; Abdullazade 90+5'	Stadium: City Stadium; Referee: Ravan Hamzazada

20 October 2023 10	Sabail	2–4	Neftçi	Baku
20:30 AZT (UTC+4)	Gomis 2'; Paná (yellow card) 32'; Nabiyev (yellow card) 45+3'; Ramalingom 81'	Report	Aliyev 12'; Jaber 45+3'; Matias (yellow card) 83' (goal) 88'; Tamás (yellow card) 90+1'; Hajiyev 90+5'	Stadium: Bayil Arena; Referee: Aliyar Ağayev

28 October 2023 11	Zira	2–2	Sabail	Zirə
16:00 AZT (UTC+4)	Djibrilla 19'; Akhmedzade 79'; Zebli (yellow card) 87'; Alıyev (yellow card) 87'; Isayev (yellow card) 89'	Report	Nuno 31', 34'; Mehremić (yellow card) 75'	Stadium: Zira Olympic Sport Complex Stadium; Referee: Rauf Jabarov

3 November 2023 12	Sabail	2–1	Turan Tovuz	Baku
19:00 AZT (UTC+4)	Ağayev (yellow card) 38'; Abdullazade 47'; Ramalingom 78' (pen.)	Report	John 27'; Miller (yellow card) 54'; Marandici (yellow card) 75'; Hajiyev (yellow card) 90+3'; Aliyev (yellow card) 90+4'; Brunão (yellow card) 90+4'	Stadium: Bayil Arena; Referee: Kamranbay Rahimov

12 November 2023 13	Qarabağ	3–1	Sabail	Baku
19:00 AZT (UTC+4)	Bayramov 8'; Benzia 43'; Juninho 54'	Report	Mehremić (yellow card) 45+1'; Nuno 77'	Stadium: Tofiq Bahramov Republican Stadium; Referee: Ravan Hamzazada

25 November 2023 14	Sabail	0–0	Kapaz	Baku
18:30 AZT (UTC+4)	Ahmadov (yellow card) 29'; Paná (yellow card) 45'; Nuno (yellow card) 83'; Nabiyev (yellow card) 86'	Report	Alijanov (yellow card) 14'; Papunashvili (yellow card) 18'	Stadium: Bayil Arena; Referee: Kamal Umudlu

2 December 2023 15	Araz-Naxçıvan	1–1	Sabail	Baku
16:00 AZT (UTC+4)	Abdullayev (yellow card) 14'; Kadiri 18'	Report	Hasanov (yellow card) 28'; Lugasi (yellow card) 85'; Mehremić (yellow card) 88'; Kurdić 90+3' (o.g.)	Stadium: Dalga Arena; Referee: Ravan Hamzazada

10 December 2023 16	Sabah	4–0	Sabail	Masazır
15:00 AZT (UTC+4)	Chakla 8', 22'; Sekidika 28'; Thill 59'	Report	Bardea (yellow card) 38'; Ramalingom (yellow card) 42'	Stadium: Bank Respublika Arena; Referee: Elcin Masiyev

15 December 2023 17	Sabail	3–0	Gabala	Baku
17:00 AZT (UTC+4)	Nuno (yellow card) 8'; Lugasi 18'; Haziyev (yellow card) 45+2'; Naghiyev (yellow card) 50'; Qirtimov 52' (o.g.); Ramalingom 60' (pen.)	Report	Qirtimov (yellow card) 6'; Tetteh (red card) 35'; Mammadov (yellow card) 87'	Stadium: Bayil Arena; Referee: Rauf Cabarov

23 December 2023 18	Sumgayit	1–0	Sabail	Sumgait
18:30 AZT (UTC+4)	Mustafayev (yellow card) 68'; Mehremić 70' (o.g.)	Report	Lugasi (yellow card) 63'; Maharramli (yellow card) 82'	Stadium: Kapital Bank Arena; Referee: Raad Ahmadov

22 January 2024 19	Sabail	0–0	Zira	Baku
15:00 AZT (UTC+4)	Paná (yellow card) 20'; Naghiyev (yellow card) 74'; Mehremić (yellow card) 90+1'; Lugasi (yellow card) 90+4'	Report	Ruan (yellow card) 13'; Zebli (yellow card) 54'; Utzig (yellow card) 55'	Stadium: Bayil Arena; Referee: Farid Haciyev

26 January 2024 20	Turan Tovuz	3–1	Sabail	Tovuz
15:00 AZT (UTC+4)	Aliyev (yellow card) 21'; Guseynov 24'; Pachu 73', 86'	Report	Ramalingom (yellow card) 14'; Naghiyev (yellow card) 56'; Nuno 81'	Stadium: City Stadium; Referee: Rauf Allahverdiyev

3 February 2024 21	Sabail	1–2	Qarabağ	Baku
15:00 AZT (UTC+4)	Nuno 67' (pen.); Najah (yellow card) 69'; Nabiyev (yellow card) 90+7'	Report	Bayramov 14' (pen.); L.Andrade (yellow card) 35'; Romão (yellow card) 45+2'; Medvedev (yellow card) 53' (yellow-red card) 66'; Benzia 59' (pen.); Vešović (yellow card) 77'; Lunyov (yellow card) 90+7'	Stadium: Bayil Arena; Referee: Javid Jalilov

12 February 2024 22	Kapaz	1–4	Sabail	Ganja
15:00 AZT (UTC+4)	Papunashvili (yellow card) 14'; Júnior 29'; Alijanov (yellow card) 45+5'; Karimov (yellow card) 80'; Fall (yellow card) 84'; Rodrigues (yellow card) 87'; Shahverdiyev (yellow card) 87'	Report	Nuno (yellow card) 24'; Ramalingom 45+6' (pen.); Abdullazade 51'; Allouch 60', 90'; Lugasi (yellow card) 64'; Deslandes (yellow card) 83'; Abdullayev (yellow card) 90+7'	Stadium: City Stadium

17 February 2024 23	Sabail	2–2	Araz-Naxçıvan	Baku
18:30 AZT (UTC+4)	Ramalingom 13', 61'; Mehremić (yellow card) 90+4'	Report	Aliyev 30', 35'; Igor (yellow card) 69'; Manafov (yellow card) 76'	Stadium: Bayil Arena; Referee: Kamran Aliyev

24 February 2024 24	Sabail	2–0	Sabah	Baku
17:30 AZT (UTC+4)	Abdullazade (yellow card) 23'; Ramalingom 52'; Najah (yellow card) 84'; Naghiyev (yellow card) 90'; Abdullayev 90+2'; Haziyev (yellow card) 90+2'	Report	Seydiyev (yellow card) 76'	Stadium: Bayil Arena; Referee: Raad Ahmadov

3 March 2024 25	Gabala	2–3	Sabail	Qabala
16:00 AZT (UTC+4)	Abbasov 14'; Khalaila 27'; Áfrico (red card) 40'; Musayev (yellow card) 87'	Report	Nabiyev 59'; Abdullazade 65'; Masika (yellow card) 72'; Bardea 90+1'	Stadium: City Stadium; Referee: Rauf Jabarov

8 March 2024 26	Sabail	0–1	Sumgayit	Baku
19:00 AZT (UTC+4)	Maharramli (yellow card) 54'	Report	Ninga 10'; Badalov (yellow card) 35'; Octávio (yellow card) 86'; Suleymanli (yellow card) 86'	Stadium: Bayil Arena; Referee: Tural Qurbanov

15 March 2024 27	Neftçi	3–0	Sabail	Baku
19:00 AZT (UTC+4)	Bardea 24' (o.g.); Salahlı 27'; Eddy (yellow card) 45+1'; Bogomolsky 85'; Matias (yellow card) 90'	Report	Naghiyev (yellow card) 54'	Stadium: Neftçi Arena; Referee: Ingilab Mammadov

30 March 2024 28	Sabail	1–1	Turan Tovuz	Baku
15:30 AZT (UTC+4)	Nuno 21'	Report	Najafov (yellow card) 31'; Hackman (yellow card) 39'; Nabiyev 45+4' (pen.); Brunão (yellow card) 55'; Pachu (yellow card) 59'	Stadium: Bayil Arena; Referee: Ravan Hamzazada

6 April 2024 29	Qarabağ	4–1	Sabail	Baku
20:00 AZT (UTC+4)	Benzia 15', 40'; Bayramov (yellow card) 45+1' (goal) 69' (pen.); Medina (yellow card) 48'; Silva (yellow card) 81'; Akhundzade 90'	Report	Bardea 7' (yellow card) 37'; Queta (yellow card) 28'; Mehremić (yellow card) 44'; Abdullazade (yellow card) 46' (goal) 88'; Nuno (yellow card) 53'; Lugasi (yellow card) 76'	Stadium: Tofiq Bahramov Republican Stadium; Referee: Nicat İsmayıllı

14 April 2024 30	Sabail	3–3	Kapaz	Baku
16:30 AZT (UTC+4)	Nuno 49'; Ramalingom 53'; Naghiyev (yellow card) 70'; Abdullazade 73'; Mehremić (yellow card) 90+3' (red card) 90+3'	Report	Taghiyev 25' (yellow card) 45'; Fall 29'; Seyidov (yellow card) 65'; Kvirkvia 90+5'	Stadium: Bayil Arena; Referee: Javid Jalilov

21 April 2024 31	Araz-Naxçıvan	0–2	Sabail	Baku
19:00 AZT (UTC+4)	Kurdić (yellow card) 34'; Igor (yellow card) 39'	Report	Ramalingom 32' (pen.); Naghiyev (yellow card) 35'; Nabiyev 75'	Stadium: Dalga Arena; Referee: Tural Qurbanov

27 April 2024 32	Sabah	2–0	Sabail	Masazır
18:00 AZT (UTC+4)	Irazabal 22'; Sekidika 40'	Report	Lugasi (yellow card) 19'	Stadium: Bank Respublika Arena; Referee: Elcin Masiyev

6 May 2024 33	Sabail	2–3	Gabala	Baku
19:00 AZT (UTC+4)	Ramalingom 17' (pen.); Nuno 40' (pen.); Lugasi (yellow card) 67'	Report	Ochihava (yellow card) 14'; Khalaila 20', 56' (pen.); Allach 32'; Safarov (yellow card) 62'; Ramazanov (yellow card) 83'	Stadium: Bayil Arena; Referee: Ali Aliyev

12 May 2024 34	Sumgayit	2–1	Sabail	Sumgait
19:30 AZT (UTC+4)	Octávio (yellow card) 13'; Ninga 41' (pen.), 45' (yellow card) 51'; Murata (yellow card) 77'	Report	Najah (yellow card) 21'; Abdullazade (yellow card) 68'; Mehremić (yellow card) 82'; Ramalingom 90+5'	Stadium: Kapital Bank Arena; Referee: Raad Ahmadov

18 May 2024 35	Sabail	0–3	Neftçi	Baku
17:00 AZT (UTC+4)	Nuno (yellow card) 68'; Ramalingom (yellow card) 90+4'	Report	Haghverdi (yellow card) 55'; Lebon (yellow card) 61'; Moreno 69'; Jaber 77'; Qarayev 82'	Stadium: Bayil Arena; Referee: Tural Qurbanov

25 May 2024 36	Zira	1–0	Sabail	Zirə
19:00 AZT (UTC+4)	Ruan (yellow card) 45'; Alıyev 57'; Zebli (yellow card) 85'; Silva (yellow card) 86'; Ibrahimli (yellow card) 90+4'	Report	Mehremić (yellow card) 5'; Naghiyev (yellow card) 11'; Paná (yellow card) 26' (yellow-red card) 70'; Nabiyev (yellow card) 32'; Deslandes (yellow card) 90'	Stadium: Zira Olympic Sport Complex Stadium; Referee: Ingilab Mammadov

==== League table ====
Pos	Team	Pld	W	D	L	GF	GA	GD	Pts
5	Neftçi	36	16	8	12	51	40	+11	56
6	Turan Tovuz	36	13	9	14	53	53	0	48
7	Sabail	36	11	9	16	50	60	−10	42
8	Araz-Naxçıvan	36	9	9	18	31	50	−19	36
9	Kapaz	36	9	8	19	39	67	−28	35

Source: Soccerway
Rules for classification: 1) Points; 2) Head-to-head points; 3) Head-to-head goal difference; 4) Head-to-head goals scored; 5) Head-to-head away goals scored (only if two teams); 6) Goal difference; 7) Goals scored.

=== Azerbaijan Cup ===
28 November 2023 Second Round	Shafa Baku	0–7	Sabail	Baku
15:00 AZT (UTC+4)	Jumshudov (yellow card) 36'; Karimov (yellow card) 70'	Report	Abdullayev 10'; Lugasi 11'; Mehremić 20'; Qarayev 25'; Yunanov 39', 78'; Ramalingom 88'	Stadium: Bayil Arena; Attendance: 110; Referee: Ali Aliyev

20 December 2023 Last 16	Sabail	6–0	Shamakhi	Baku
14:00 AZT (UTC+4)	Yunanov 23' (pen.), 45'; Nuno 50'; Abdullazade 56', 80' (yellow card) 75'; Mehremić 90+2'	Report	Alasgarov (yellow card) 32'	Stadium: Bayil Arena; Attendance: 100; Referee: Tural Gurbanov

30 January 2024 Quarterfinal 1st leg	Sabail	1–2	Zira	Baku
15:00 AZT (UTC+4)	Haziyev (yellow card) 28'; Ramalingom 70'	Report	Najah 48' (o.g.); Ruan 60'	Stadium: Bayil Arena; Attendance: 200; Referee: Inqilab Mammadov

8 February 2024 Quarterfinal 2nd leg	Zira	3–0 (5–1 agg.)	Sabail	Zirə
17:00 AZT (UTC+4)	Ibrahim 4' (yellow card) 26'; Kuliyev (yellow card) 32'; Sadykhov 42'; Utzig 74' (yellow card) 88'	Report	Bardea (yellow card) 90+2'	Stadium: Zira Olympic Sport Complex Stadium; Attendance: 800; Referee: Elçin Masiyev

== Squad statistics ==
As of match played 25 May 2024

=== Appearances and goals ===
No.	Pos	Nat	Player	Total		Premier League		Azerbaijan Cup	
No.	Pos	Nat	Player	Apps	Goals	Apps	Goals	Apps	Goals
1	GK	(Azerbaijan) AZE	Səlahət Ağayev	32	0	31	0	1	0
3	DF	(France) FRA	Sylvain Deslandes	17	0	13+3	0	1	0
4	DF	(Bosnia and Herzegovina) BIH	Adi Mehremić	35	3	28+3	1	3+1	2
5	DF	(Azerbaijan) AZE	Adil Naghiyev	20	0	13+4	0	3	0
6	DF	(Azerbaijan) AZE	Jabir Amirli	16	0	10+4	0	1+1	0
7	FW	(Guinea-Bissau) GBS	Madi Queta	19	0	9+8	0	2	0
8	FW	(Azerbaijan) AZE	Bahadur Haziyev	20	0	3+14	0	3	0
9	FW	(Madagascar) MAD	Alexandre Ramalingom	38	17	31+4	15	2+1	2
10	FW	(Azerbaijan) AZE	Aghabala Ramazanov	14	1	9+5	1	0	0
11	MF	(Azerbaijan) AZE	Rufat Abdullazade	38	8	23+12	6	0+3	2
12	GK	(Azerbaijan) AZE	Huseynali Guliyev	8	0	5	0	3	0
14	FW	(Netherlands) NED	Soulyman Allouch	16	2	5+10	2	1	0
15	DF	(Azerbaijan) AZE	Vugar Hasanov	3	0	1+1	0	1	0
16	DF	(Azerbaijan) AZE	Emin Rustamov	2	0	0	0	2	0
17	MF	(Azerbaijan) AZE	Rafael Maharramli	28	0	16+10	0	2	0
18	MF	(Azerbaijan) AZE	Suleyman Ahmadov	11	0	6+5	0	0	0
19	MF	(Azerbaijan) AZE	Samir Abdullayev	27	2	2+21	1	2+2	1
21	MF	(Netherlands) NED	Anass Najah	36	0	31+3	0	2	0
27	MF	(Portugal) POR	Pedro Nuno	37	11	34	10	1+2	1
34	MF	(Azerbaijan) AZE	Taleh Qarayev	3	1	0+1	0	2	1
38	MF	(Azerbaijan) AZE	Zeynaddin Abdurahmanov	2	0	0	0	2	0
42	MF	(Azerbaijan) AZE	Adam Topalov	1	0	0	0	0+1	0
44	MF	(Israel) ISR	Yadin Lugasi	37	3	10+23	2	2+2	1
48	FW	(Azerbaijan) AZE	Ayaz Mikayılov	2	0	0+1	0	0+1	0
55	DF	(Israel) ISR	Nir Bardea	28	2	26+1	2	0+1	0
62	MF	(Azerbaijan) AZE	Zaman Zamanlı	1	0	0	0	0+1	0
67	FW	(Azerbaijan) AZE	İftixar İbrahimov	1	0	0	0	0+1	0
74	DF	(Azerbaijan) AZE	Yusif Nabiyev	37	5	32+2	5	2+1	0
77	FW	(Kenya) KEN	Ayub Masika	16	0	5+9	0	2	0
88	MF	(Angola) ANG	Paná	39	1	35+1	1	2+1	0
99	FW	(Guinea-Bissau) GBS	David Gomis	16	2	15+1	2	0	0
Players away on loan:
9	FW	(Azerbaijan) AZE	Amil Yunanov	14	4	1+11	0	2	4
Players who left Sabail during the season:

=== Goal scorers ===
Place	Position	Nation	Number	Name	Premier League	Azerbaijan Cup	Total
1	FW	(Madagascar)	90	Alexandre Ramalingom	15	2	17
2	MF	(Portugal)	27	Pedro Nuno	10	1	11
3	MF	(Azerbaijan)	11	Rufat Abdullazade	6	2	8
4	MF	(Azerbaijan)	74	Yusif Nabiyev	5	0	5
5	FW	(Azerbaijan)	9	Amil Yunanov	0	4	4
6	MF	(Israel)	44	Yadin Lugasi	2	1	3
6	DF	(Bosnia and Herzegovina)	4	Adi Mehremić	1	2	3
8	FW	(Guinea-Bissau)	99	David Gomis	2	0	2
8	FW	(Netherlands)	14	Soulyman Allouch	2	0	2
8	DF	(Israel)	55	Nir Bardea	2	0	2
8	MF	(Azerbaijan)	19	Samir Abdullayev	1	1	2
8				Own goal	2	0	2
13	FW	(Azerbaijan)	10	Aghabala Ramazanov	1	0	1
13	MF	(Angola)	88	Paná	1	0	1
13	MF	(Azerbaijan)	34	Taleh Qarayev	0	1	1
				TOTALS	50	14	64

=== Clean sheets ===
Place	Position	Nation	Number	Name	Premier League	Azerbaijan Cup	Total
1	GK	(Azerbaijan)	1	Səlahət Ağayev	6	1	7
2	GK	(Azerbaijan)	12	Huseynali Guliyev	2	1	3
				TOTALS	8	2	10

=== Disciplinary record ===
Number	Nation	Position	Name	Premier League		Azerbaijan Cup		Total	
Number	Nation	Position	Name	Yellow card	Red card	Yellow card	Red card	Yellow card	Red card
1	(Azerbaijan)	GK	Səlahət Ağayev	3	0	0	0	3	0
3	(France)	DF	Sylvain Deslandes	2	0	0	0	2	0
4	(Bosnia and Herzegovina)	DF	Adi Mehremić	11	1	0	0	11	1
5	(Azerbaijan)	DF	Adil Naghiyev	7	0	0	0	7	0
6	(Azerbaijan)	DF	Jabir Amirli	1	0	0	0	1	0
7	(Guinea-Bissau)	FW	Madi Queta	1	0	0	0	1	0
8	(Azerbaijan)	FW	Bahadur Haziyev	3	0	1	0	4	0
9	(Madagascar)	FW	Alexandre Ramalingom	3	0	0	0	3	0
10	(Azerbaijan)	FW	Aghabala Ramazanov	2	0	0	0	2	0
11	(Azerbaijan)	MF	Rufat Abdullazade	4	0	0	0	4	0
15	(Azerbaijan)	DF	Vugar Hasanov	1	0	0	0	1	0
17	(Azerbaijan)	MF	Rafael Maharramli	2	0	0	0	2	0
18	(Azerbaijan)	MF	Suleyman Ahmadov	3	0	0	0	3	0
21	(Netherlands)	MF	Anass Najah	6	0	0	0	6	0
27	(Portugal)	MF	Pedro Nuno	9	0	0	0	9	0
44	(Israel)	MF	Yadin Lugasi	8	0	0	0	8	0
55	(Israel)	DF	Nir Bardea	4	0	1	0	5	0
74	(Azerbaijan)	DF	Yusif Nabiyev	7	0	0	0	7	0
77	(Kenya)	FW	Ayub Masika	1	0	0	0	1	0
88	(Angola)	MF	Paná	5	1	0	0	5	1
99	(Guinea-Bissau)	FW	David Gomis	2	0	0	0	2	0
Players who left Sabail during the season:
			TOTALS	84	2	3	0	87	2
