= 2023–24 Sabah FC season =

Sabah
2023–24 season
- Manager: Murad Musayev (until 1 February); Ruslan Qafitullin (1 February-5 March); Krunoslav Rendulić (from 5 March)
- Stadium: Bank Respublika Arena
- Premier League: 3rd
- Azerbaijan Cup: Quarterfinal vs Qarabağ
- Europa Conference League: Third qualifying round vs Partizan
- Top goalscorer: League: Anatoliy Nuriyev (6); Davit Volkovi (6); All: Davit Volkovi (7); Jesse Sekidika (7)
Home colours	Away colours

The Sabah FC 2023–24 season was Sabah's sixth Azerbaijan Premier League season, and their seventh season in existence.

== Season overview ==
On 21 June, Sabah announced the signing of Rahman Dashdamirov from Shamakhi.

On 28 June, Sabah announced the signing of Sofian Chakla from Ponferradina, with Jearl Margaritha singing from TOP Oss the following day.

On 7 July, Sabah announced the signing of Vincent Thill from Vorskla Poltava.

On 25 July, Sabah announced the signing of Marouane Hadhoudi from Raja Casablanca.

On 28 August, Sabah announced the signing of Ayaz Guliyev from Khimki to a three-year contract.

On 5 September, Sabah announced the signing of Jesse Sekidika from Eyüpspor to a two-year contract, with the option of an additional year. The following day, 6 September, Sabah announced the signing of Kaheem Parris on loan from Dynamo Kyiv until the end of the season.

On 13 September, Sabah announced the signing of Ishak Belfodil from Al-Gharafa to a two-year contract with the option of a third year.

On 26 December, Ceyhun Nuriyev left Sabah to sign for Zira. Later the same day, Sabah extended their contract with Nijat Mehbaliyev until June 2026.

On 4 January, Aleksey Isayev left the club to sign for Qarabağ.

On 1 February, Sabah announced that Murad Musayev had left his role as head coach after his resignation had been accepted.

On 5 March 2024, Sabah announced the appointment of Krunoslav Rendulić as their new head coach, on an 18-month contract.

== Squad ==
As of match played 25 May 2024

No.	Name	Nationality	Position	Date of birth (age)	Signed from	Signed in	Contract ends	Apps.	Goals
Goalkeepers
1	Yusif Imanov	(Azerbaijan)	GK	27 September 2002 (aged 21)	Academy	2020		74	0
16	Rustam Samiqullin	(Azerbaijan)	GK	23 December 2002 (aged 21)	Academy	2020		4	0
55	Nijat Mehbaliyev	(Azerbaijan)	GK	11 September 2000 (aged 23)	Qarabağ	2020	2026	17	0
Defenders
2	Amin Seydiyev	(Azerbaijan)	DF	15 November 1998 (aged 25)	Gabala	2020		127	4
3	Jon Irazabal	(Malaysia)	DF	28 November 1996 (aged 27)	SD Amorebieta	2022	2025	59	5
5	Rahman Dashdamirov	(Azerbaijan)	DF	20 October 1999 (aged 24)	Shamakhi	2023	2025	14	0
7	Bojan Letić	(Bosnia and Herzegovina)	DF	21 December 1992 (aged 31)	Unattached	2022		82	6
17	Tellur Mutallimov	(Azerbaijan)	DF	8 April 1995 (aged 29)	Sumgayit	2022	2024	63	3
24	Marouane Hadhoudi	(Morocco)	DF	13 February 1992 (aged 32)	Raja Casablanca	2023	2024 (+1)	18	0
40	Rauf Rustamli	(Azerbaijan)	DF	11 January 2003 (aged 21)	Gabala	2023		2	0
44	Sofian Chakla	(Morocco)	DF	2 September 1993 (aged 30)	Ponferradina	2023	2025	38	3
Midfielders
4	Elvin Jamalov	(Azerbaijan)	MF	4 February 1995 (aged 29)	Zira	2021		95	2
6	Abdulakh Khaybulayev	(Azerbaijan)	MF	19 August 2001 (aged 22)	Academy	2021		21	0
8	Ayaz Guliyev	(Russia)	MF	27 November 1996 (aged 27)	Khimki	2023	2026	25	1
9	Anatoliy Nuriyev	(Azerbaijan)	MF	20 May 1996 (aged 28)	Kolos Kovalivka	2022	2025	70	10
10	Namiq Ələsgərov	(Azerbaijan)	MF	3 February 1995 (aged 29)	Bursaspor	2022	2025	54	5
11	Cristian Ceballos	(Spain)	MF	3 December 1992 (aged 31)	Qatar	2021	2024	31	5
12	Vincent Thill	(Luxembourg)	MF	4 February 2000 (aged 24)	Vorskla Poltava	2023	2025	22	2
15	Christian	(Brazil)	MF	14 June 1989 (aged 34)	Académica de Coimbra	2022		71	4
21	Ildar Alekperov	(Azerbaijan)	MF	7 April 2001 (aged 23)	Neftekhimik Nizhnekamsk	2021	2024	34	0
22	Seymur Mammadov	(Azerbaijan)	MF	29 May 2003 (aged 20)	Academy	2022		3	1
28	Kaheem Parris	(Jamaica)	MF	6 January 2000 (aged 24)	on loan from Dynamo Kyiv	2023	2024	31	4
70	Jesse Sekidika	(Nigeria)	MF	14 July 1996 (aged 27)	Eyüpspor	2023	2025(+1)	34	7
88	Khayal Aliyev	(Azerbaijan)	MF	18 February 2004 (aged 20)	Academy	2023		13	0
Forwards
14	Ishak Belfodil	(Algeria)	FW	12 January 1992 (aged 32)	Al-Gharafa	2022	2024	21	5
18	Davit Volkovi	(Georgia (country))	FW	3 June 1995 (aged 28)	Zira	2022	2024	71	19
19	Emmanuel Apeh	(Nigeria)	FW	25 October 1996 (aged 27)	Tenerife	2022	2024	75	16
27	Jearl Margaritha	(Curaçao)	FW	10 April 2000 (aged 24)	TOP Oss	2023	2027	23	1
33	Jamal Jafarov	(Azerbaijan)	FW	25 February 2002 (aged 22)	Anzhi Makhachkala	2020	2025	23	0
90	Timilehin Oluwaseun	(Nigeria)	FW	10 June 2005 (aged 18)	Dino SC	2024		2	0
Out on loan
6	Shakir Seyidov	(Azerbaijan)	MF	31 December 2000 (aged 23)	Academy	2018		49	2
	Abdulla Rzayev	(Azerbaijan)	DF	12 March 2002 (aged 22)	Academy	2020		17	0
	Idris Ingilabli	(Azerbaijan)	MF	6 October 2001 (aged 22)	Gabala	2020	2024	1	0
	Veysal Rzayev	(Azerbaijan)	MF	24 October 2002 (aged 21)	Academy	2020		17	0
Left during the season
10	Aleksey Isayev	(Azerbaijan)	MF	9 November 1995 (aged 28)	Sumgayit	2020	2023	109	12
20	Joy-Lance Mickels	(Germany)	MF	29 March 1994 (aged 30)	MVV Maastricht	2021	2023	69	33
29	Ceyhun Nuriyev	(Azerbaijan)	MF	30 March 2001 (aged 23)	Academy	2020		54	4
99	Higor Gabriel	(Brazil)	DF	28 April 1999 (aged 25)	Unattached	2022	2024	2	0

== Transfers ==
=== In ===
Date	Position	Nationality	Name	From	Fee	Ref.
21 June 2023	DF	(Azerbaijan)	Rahman Dashdamirov	Shamakhi	Undisclosed	
28 June 2023	DF	(Morocco)	Sofian Chakla	Ponferradina	Undisclosed	
29 June 2023	FW	(Curaçao)	Jearl Margaritha	TOP Oss	Undisclosed	
7 July 2023	MF	(Luxembourg)	Vincent Thill	Vorskla Poltava	Undisclosed	
25 July 2023	DF	(Morocco)	Marouane Hadhoudi	Raja Casablanca	Undisclosed	
28 August 2023	MF	(Russia)	Ayaz Guliyev	Khimki	Undisclosed	
5 September 2023	MF	(Nigeria)	Jesse Sekidika	Eyüpspor	Undisclosed	
13 September 2023	FW	(Algeria)	Ishak Belfodil	Al-Gharafa	Undisclosed	

=== Loans in ===
Date from	Position	Nationality	Name	From	Date to	Ref.
6 September 2023	MF	(Jamaica)	Kaheem Parris	Dynamo Kyiv	End of season	

=== Out ===
Date	Position	Nationality	Name	To	Fee	Ref.
9 July 2023	FW	(Azerbaijan)	Kamran Guliyev	Sumgayit	Undisclosed	
14 August 2023	MF	(Germany)	Joy-Lance Mickels	Al Faisaly	Undisclosed	
26 December 2023	MF	(Azerbaijan)	Ceyhun Nuriyev	Zira	Undisclosed	
4 January 2024	MF	(Azerbaijan)	Aleksey Isayev	Qarabağ	Undisclosed	

=== Loans out ===
Date from	Position	Nationality	Name	To	Date to	Ref.
28 January 2023	MF	(Azerbaijan)	Abdulakh Khaybulayev	Samtredia	31 December 2023	
25 August 2023	MF	(Azerbaijan)	Shakir Seyidov	Kapaz	End of season	

=== Released ===
Date	Position	Nationality	Name	Joined	Date	Ref
24 June 2023	DF	(Ukraine)	Zurab Ochihava	Gabala	24 June 2023	
30 June 2023	DF	(Senegal)	Abdoulaye Ba	Tondela	24 July 2023	
5 July 2023	DF	(Azerbaijan)	Bəxtiyar Həsənalızadə	Tuzlaspor		
23 September 2023	DF	(Brazil)	Higor Gabriel	Hibernians	31 January 2024	

== Friendlies ==
9 July 2023	Al Sadd	1–3	Sabah	St. Martin in Passeier, Italy
19:00 AZT (UTC+4)	Afif 62'	Report	Ələsgərov 4'; Irazabal 30'; Apeh 63' (pen.); (red card) 75'

15 July 2023	St. Pauli	4–1	Sabah	St. Martin in Passeier, Italy
14:00 AZT (UTC+4)		Report	Mickels

19 July 2023	Olympiacos	1–1	Sabah	Kematen in Tirol, Austria
14:00 AZT (UTC+4)	64'	Report	Volkovi 42'	Stadium: Kematen stadium

9 January 2024	Sabah	2–1	Rapid București	Antalya, Turkey
18:00 AZT (UTC+4)	Sekidika 45+1'; Nuriyev 68'	Report	61' (pen.)	Stadium: Mardan" Sports Complex

14 January 2024	Sabah	0–3	Vorskla Poltava	Antalya, Turkey
18:00 AZT (UTC+4)		Report	Perduta 43'; Rodrigues 72'; Stepanyuk 83'

== Competitions ==
=== Overview ===
Competition	First match	Last match	Starting round	Final position	Record							
Competition	First match	Last match	Starting round	Final position	Pld	W	D	L	GF	GA	GD	Win %
Premier League	6 August 2023	25 May 2024	Matchday 1	3rd	36	17	7	12	50	40	+10	47.22
Azerbaijan Cup	18 December 2023	8 February 2024	Last 16	Quarterfinal	3	2	0	1	9	13	−4	66.67
UEFA Europa Conference League	26 July 2023	17 August 2023	Second qualifying round	Third qualifying round	4	3	0	1	6	3	+3	75.00
Total					43	22	7	14	65	56	+9	51.16

Last updated: 25 May 2024
Source: Competitions

=== Premier League ===
==== Results summary ====
Overall								Home						Away					
Pld	W	D	L	GF	GA	GD	Pts	W	D	L	GF	GA	GD	W	D	L	GF	GA	GD
36	17	7	12	50	40	+10	58	9	5	4	32	18	+14	8	2	8	18	22	−4

Last updated: 25 May 2024.
Source: See Results

==== Results by round ====
Round	1	2	3	4	5	6	7	8	9	10	11	12	13	14	15	16	17	18	19	20	21	22	23	24	25	26	27	28	29	30	31	32	33	34	35	36
Ground	H	H (Note: matchday 3)	A (Note: matchday 4)	H (Note: matchday 5)	A (Note: matchday 6)	H (Note: matchday 7)	A (Note: matchday 8)	H (Note: matchday 9)	H (Note: matchday 10)	A (Note: matchday 2)	A	H	A	H	A	H	A	A	H	A	H	A	H	A	H	H	A	H	A	H	A	H	A	A	H	A
Result	W	D	L	L	L	D	D	D	W	L	W	L	W	L	W	W	L	L	D	W	D	D	W	L	W	W	W	L	L	W	W	W	W	L	W	W
Position	1	5	6	8	8	8	9	8	8	8	8	8	7	7	6	6	7	8	7	7	5	8	7	7	6	3	2	5	5	5	5	5	3	5	4	3

Updated to match(es) played on 25 May 2024. Source: See Results
A = Away; H = Home; W = Win; D = Draw; L = Loss

==== Results ====
4 August 2023 1	Sabah	5–0	Gabala	Masazır
20:00 AZT (UTC+4)	Apeh 20'; Nuriyev 36'; Isayev 44'; Mickels 56'; Mutallimov 79'	Report	Abbasov (yellow card) 38'	Stadium: Bank Respublika Arena; Referee: Javid Jalilov

20 August 2023 3	Sabah	1–1	Neftçi	Masazır
20:00 AZT (UTC+4)	Letić 44' (yellow card) 90+4'; Thill (yellow card) 65'; Nuriyev (yellow card) 68'; Chakla (yellow card) 74'; Seydiyev (yellow card) 86'; Mutallimov (yellow card) 89'; Christian (yellow card) 90+3'	Report	Irazabal 49' (o.g.); Shinyashiki (yellow card) 74'; Matias (yellow card) 78'; Jaber (yellow card) 81'; Qarayev (yellow card) 89'; Mammadov (yellow card) 89'	Stadium: Bank Respublika Arena; Referee: Aliyar Aghayev

26 August 2023 4	Zira	1–0	Sabah	Zirə
19:30 AZT (UTC+4)	Kulach 2' (yellow card) 68'; Chantakias (yellow card) 63'; Alıyev (yellow card) 74'	Report	Seydiyev (red card) 70'	Stadium: Zira Olympic Sport Complex Stadium; Referee: Elcin Masiyev

1 September 2023 5	Sabah	0–3	Turan Tovuz	Masazır
19:00 AZT (UTC+4)	Thill (yellow card) 45'; Isayev (yellow card) 45+1'; Hadhoudi (yellow card) 55'; Camalov (yellow card) 60'; Nuriyev (yellow card) 77'	Report	Miller 19'; Aliyev 57'; Pusi (yellow card) 60' (goal) 79'	Stadium: Bank Respublika Arena; Referee: Rauf Jabarov

17 September 2023 6	Qarabağ	2–0	Sabah	Baku
19:30 AZT (UTC+4)	Juninho 56'; Romão (yellow card) 62'; Keyta 88'	Report	Thill (yellow card) 64'; Camalov (yellow card) 79'; Margaritha (yellow card) 90+2'	Stadium: Tofiq Bahramov Republican Stadium; Referee: Tural Qurbanov

24 September 2023 7	Sabah	2–2	Kapaz	Masazır
17:00 AZT (UTC+4)	Camalov (yellow card) 22'; Irazabal 24'; Letić 51' (pen.); Chakla (yellow card) 64'	Report	Shuaibu 9'; Masimov (yellow card) 36'; Papunashvili (yellow card) 45+3' (goal) 60'; Taghiyev (yellow card) 70'; Júnior (yellow card) 90+5'	Stadium: Bank Respublika Arena; Referee: Ingilab Mammadov

30 September 2023 8	Sabail	2–2	Sabah	Baku
18:00 AZT (UTC+4)	Nabiyev 29' (yellow card) 65'; Ramazanov (yellow card) 65'; Najah (yellow card) 71'; Nuno (yellow card) 80'; Mehremić 87'	Report	Irazabal (yellow card) 27'; Apeh 41' (pen.); Parris (yellow card) 65'; Nuriyev 84'; Guliyev (yellow card) 90+1'; Letić (yellow card) 90+4' (red card) 90+4'	Stadium: Bayil Arena; Referee: Javid Jalilov

7 October 2023 9	Sabah	1–1	Araz-Naxçıvan	Masazır
18:00 AZT (UTC+4)	Nuriyev 82'	Report	Wanderson (yellow card) 67'; Belfodil 76' (pen.); Aliyev (yellow card) 83'	Stadium: Bank Respublika Arena; Referee: Rauf Jabarov

21 October 2023 10	Sabah	3–1	Sumgayit	Masazır
18:00 AZT (UTC+4)	Apeh (yellow card) 34'; Irazabal 54'; Parris (yellow card) 58'; Ələsgərov 81'; Chakla (yellow card) 87'; Volkovi 90+6'	Report	Suliman 9'; Sadigli (yellow card) 87'; Aliyev (yellow card) 90+7'	Stadium: Bank Respublika Arena; Referee: Nicat İsmayıllı

25 October 2023 2	Sumgayit	1–0	Sabah	Sumgait
18:30 AZT (UTC+4)	Aliyev 4' (yellow card) 84'; Badalov (yellow card) 81'; Dzhenetov (yellow card) 85'; Suleymanli (yellow card) 88'	Report	Guliyev (yellow card) 90+4'; İmanov (yellow card) 90+6'	Stadium: Kapital Bank Arena; Referee: Raad Ahmadov
Note: Match originally scheduled for 10 August 2023.

29 October 2023 11	Neftçi	0–1	Sabah	Baku
18:30 AZT (UTC+4)	Matias (yellow card) 58' (yellow-red card) 90+3'; Jaber (yellow card) 58'	Report	Chakla (yellow card) 25'; Apeh (yellow card) 31'; Ələsgərov (yellow card) 43'; Jamalov (yellow card) 57'; Letić 90+5'	Stadium: Neftçi Arena; Referee: Ravan Hamzazada

5 November 2023 12	Sabah	0–1	Zira	Masazır
18:30 AZT (UTC+4)	Apeh (yellow card) 42' (yellow-red card) 42'	Report	Zebli (yellow card) 46'; Akhmedzade 90+1'	Stadium: Bank Respublika Arena; Referee: Tural Qurbanov

11 November 2023 13	Turan Tovuz	2–3	Sabah	Tovuz
19:00 AZT (UTC+4)	Pachu (yellow card) 24'; Nabiyev 35' (pen.); Brunão 38'	Report	Volkovi 9', 25', 42'; Camalov (yellow card) 59'; Irazabal (yellow card) 79'; Sekidika (yellow card) 90+4'	Stadium: City Stadium; Referee: Aliyar Ağayev

24 November 2023 14	Sabah	1–2	Qarabağ	Masazır
20:00 AZT (UTC+4)	Letić (yellow card) 55'; Sekidika 64'; Guliyev (yellow card) 82'; Seydiyev (yellow card) 85'	Report	Romão (yellow card) 13'; Janković (yellow card) 48'; Bayramov 58' (pen.); Akhundzade 61'	Stadium: Bank Respublika Arena; Referee: Ingilab Mammadov

3 December 2023 15	Kapaz	0–2	Sabah	Ganja
15:00 AZT (UTC+4)	Onanuga (yellow card) 22'; Seyidov (yellow card) 26'; Papunashvili (yellow card) 34'; Khvalko (yellow card) 37'	Report	Nuriyev 6'; Ələsgərov 15'; Seydiyev (yellow card) 75'	Stadium: City Stadium; Referee: Rauf Jabarov

10 December 2023 16	Sabah	4–0	Sabail	Masazır
15:00 AZT (UTC+4)	Chakla 8', 22'; Sekidika 28'; Thill 59'	Report	Bardea (yellow card) 38'; Ramalingom (yellow card) 42'	Stadium: Bank Respublika Arena; Referee: Elcin Masiyev

15 December 2023 17	Araz-Naxçıvan	2–0	Sabah	Baku
15:00 AZT (UTC+4)	Letić 40' (o.g.); Mustafayev (yellow card) 52'; Kuzmanović (yellow card) 57'; Aliyev (yellow card) 68'; Manafov 71'	Report	Nuriyev (yellow card) 16'; Hadhoudi (yellow card) 48'; Letić (yellow card) 64'; Thill (yellow card) 70'	Stadium: Dalga Arena; Referee: Farid Haciyev

22 December 2023 18	Gabala	1–0	Sabah	Qabala
16:00 AZT (UTC+4)	Musayev 45+2'; Abramov (yellow card) 46'; Hüseynli (yellow card) 90+4'; Atangana (yellow card) 90+5'	Report	Irazabal (yellow card) 36'; Nuriyev (penalty missed) 78'; Seydiyev (yellow card) 86'	Stadium: City Stadium; Referee: Aliyar Agayev

21 January 2024 19	Sabah	0–0	Neftçi	Masazır
16:00 AZT (UTC+4)	Hadhoudi (yellow card) 86'; Christian (yellow card) 86'	Report	Valdez (yellow card) 24'; Salahlı (yellow card) 48'; Ozobić (yellow card) 87'; Bogomolsky (yellow card) 88'	Stadium: Bank Respublika Arena; Referee: Aliyar Ağayev

27 January 2024 20	Zira	0–1	Sabah	Zirə
17:30 AZT (UTC+4)	Ruan (yellow card) 71'; Silva (yellow card) 90+8'	Report	Camalov (yellow card) 17' (yellow-red card) 44'; Thill (yellow card) 29'; Chakla (yellow card) 45+3' (goal) 90+9' (pen.); Christian (yellow card) 90+2'	Stadium: Zira Olympic Sport Complex Stadium; Referee: Rauf Jabarov

3 February 2024 21	Sabah	1–1	Turan Tovuz	Masazır
17:30 AZT (UTC+4)	Parris 23'; Seydiyev (yellow card) 29'; Christian (yellow card) 44'; Nuriyev (yellow card) 70'	Report	Souza 11'; Aliyev (yellow card) 41'; Nabiyev (yellow card) 90+4'; Najafov (yellow card) 90+5'	Stadium: Bank Respublika Arena; Referee: Ingilab Mammadov

11 February 2024 22	Qarabağ	3–3	Sabah	Baku
19:00 AZT (UTC+4)	Janković 31'; Juninho 64' (pen.); Benzia 90+8'	Report	Parris (yellow card) 16'; Nuriyev (yellow card) 37'; Belfodil 45+1' (pen.), 54' (pen.); Mutallimov 90+5'	Stadium: Tofiq Bahramov Republican Stadium; Referee: Ravan Hamzazada

17 February 2024 23	Sabah	3–2	Kapaz	Masazır
16:00 AZT (UTC+4)	Seydiyev (yellow card) 21'; Parris 37'; Camalov (yellow card) 51'; Sekidika 55'; Chakla (yellow card) 58'; Christian 79'	Report	Júnior 6'; Khvalko (yellow card) 23'; Seyidov (yellow card) 30'; Onanuga (yellow card) 43'; Kvirkvia (yellow card) 45'; Yunanov 83'; Samadov (yellow card) 90'	Stadium: Bank Respublika Arena; Referee: Elcin Masiyev

24 February 2024 24	Sabail	2–0	Sabah	Baku
17:30 AZT (UTC+4)	Abdullazade (yellow card) 23'; Ramalingom 52'; Najah (yellow card) 84'; Naghiyev (yellow card) 90'; Abdullayev 90+2'; Haziyev (yellow card) 90+2'	Report	Seydiyev (yellow card) 76'	Stadium: Bayil Arena; Referee: Raad Ahmadov

2 March 2024 25	Sabah	2–0	Araz-Naxçıvan	Masazır
18:30 AZT (UTC+4)	Apeh 54'; Letić (yellow card) 59'; Parris 90+6' (pen.)	Report	Kadiri (yellow card) 32'; Kuzmanović (yellow card) 57'	Stadium: Bank Respublika Arena; Referee: Kamal Umudlu

9 March 2024 26	Sabah	2–1	Gabala	Masazır
17:30 AZT (UTC+4)	Volkovi 20', 41'; Irazabal (yellow card) 45'; Christian (yellow card) 67'; Apeh (yellow card) 90+4'	Report	Ochihava (yellow card) 25'; Allach 45+3'	Stadium: Bank Respublika Arena; Referee: Ingilab Mammadov

17 March 2024 27	Sumgayit	1–2	Sabah	Sumgait
19:00 AZT (UTC+4)	Ninga (yellow card) 45'; Badalov (yellow card) 71'; Octávio (yellow card) 80'; Sorga 84'; Abdullazade (yellow card) 90+5'	Report	Nuriyev 25'; Khachayev 62' (o.g.); Letić (yellow card) 90+2'	Stadium: Kapital Bank Arena; Referee: Aliyar Ağayev

30 March 2024 28	Sabah	0–1	Zira	Masazır
18:00 AZT (UTC+4)	Khaybulayev (yellow card) 83'	Report	Ruan 25'; Alıyev (yellow card) 34'	Stadium: Bank Respublika Arena; Referee: Elcin Masiyev

6 April 2024 29	Turan Tovuz	2–0	Sabah	Tovuz
16:00 AZT (UTC+4)	Souza 26'; Serrano (yellow card) 43'; John 82'; Bayramov (yellow card) 90+4'	Report	Guliyev (yellow card) 8'; Chakla (yellow card) 81'	Stadium: City Stadium; Referee: Aliyar Ağayev

14 April 2024 30	Sabah	3–2	Qarabağ	Masazır
19:00 AZT (UTC+4)	Seydiyev 16'; Sekidika 38'; Camalov (yellow card) 40'; Mutallimov 56'; Nuriyev (yellow card) 71'; Hadhoudi (yellow card) 77'; Irazabal (yellow card) 79'; Christian (yellow card) 88'	Report	L.Andrade 7'; Guseynov (yellow card) 57'; Akhundzade 76'	Stadium: Bank Respublika Arena; Referee: Ravan Hamzazada

21 April 2024 31	Kapaz	1–2	Sabah	Ganja
16:30 AZT (UTC+4)	Niane 61'	Report	Parris 12'; Chakla (yellow card) 25'; Belfodil 34'; Irazabal (yellow card) 69'; Nuriyev (yellow card) 90+5'	Stadium: City Stadium; Referee: Rauf Jabarov

27 April 2024 32	Sabah	2–0	Sabail	Masazır
18:00 AZT (UTC+4)	Irazabal 22'; Sekidika 40'	Report	Lugasi (yellow card) 19'	Stadium: Bank Respublika Arena; Referee: Elcin Masiyev

5 May 2024 33	Araz-Naxçıvan	0–1	Sabah	Baku
19:00 AZT (UTC+4)	Kadiri (yellow card) 49'	Report	Guliyev 1'; Seydiyev (yellow card) 6'; Camalov (yellow card) 85'; Chakla (yellow card) 90+6'	Stadium: Dalga Arena; Referee: Aliyar Ağayev

12 May 2024 34	Gabala	2–0	Sabah	Qabala
17:00 AZT (UTC+4)	Allach 34'; Clésio 45+2'; Ochihava (yellow card) 80'; Musayev (yellow card) 81'; Aliyev (yellow card) 90'	Report	Letić (yellow card) 31'; Volkovi (red card) 65'; Irazabal (yellow card) 90+2'	Stadium: City Stadium; Referee: Elcin Masiyev

18 May 2024 35	Sabah	2–0	Sumgayit	Masazır
17:00 AZT (UTC+4)	Khachayev 35' (o.g.); Nuriyev 90+1'; Hadhoudi (yellow card) 90+1'	Report	Sorga (yellow card) 58'; Badalov (yellow card) 74'	Stadium: Bank Respublika Arena; Referee: Ingilab Mammadov

25 May 2024 36	Neftçi	0–1	Sabah	Baku
19:00 AZT (UTC+4)	Eddy (yellow card) 79'; Matias (yellow card) 82'; Valdez (red card) 90+1'	Report	Guliyev (yellow card) 2'; Aliyev (yellow card) 67'; Irazabal (yellow card) 70' (red card) 90+1'; Ələsgərov 87'; Parris (red card) 90+1'; Khaybulayev (red card) 90+1'; İmanov (yellow card) 90+3'	Stadium: Neftçi Arena; Referee: Aliyar Ağayev

==== League table ====
Pos	Team	Pld	W	D	L	GF	GA	GD	Pts	Qualification or relegation
1	Qarabağ (C)	36	26	5	5	97	37	+60	83	Qualification for the Champions League second qualifying round (Note: Since already qualified Real Madrid won the Champions League, Qarabağ was promoted to the Champions League second qualifying round as one of the two champions with the highest coefficient in Champions League qualifying.)
2	Zira	36	16	10	10	33	22	+11	58 (Note: Zira are ahead of Sabah on head-to-head points: Zira 1–0 Sabah, Sabah 0–1 Zira, Zira 0–1 Sabah, Sabah 0–1 Zira)	Qualification for the Europa League first qualifying round (Note: The 2023–24 Azerbaijan Cup winners qualified for the Europa League first qualifying round. Since the cup winners (Qarabağ) qualified based on league position, the Europa League spot was passed to the second-placed team, and the second Conference League second round spot was passed to the fourth-placed team.)
3	Sabah	36	17	7	12	50	40	+10	58	Qualification for the Conference League second qualifying round
4	Sumgayit	36	15	12	9	37	38	−1	57	Qualification for the Conference League second qualifying round
5	Neftçi	36	16	8	12	51	40	+11	56	

Source: Soccerway
Rules for classification: 1) Points; 2) Head-to-head points; 3) Head-to-head goal difference; 4) Head-to-head goals scored; 5) Head-to-head away goals scored (only if two teams); 6) Goal difference; 7) Goals scored.
(C) Champions

=== Azerbaijan Cup ===
18 December 2023 Last 16	Kapaz	3–4	Sabah	Ganja
14:00 AZT (UTC+4)	Niane 35' (pen.), 44', 76' (yellow card) 83'; Masimov (yellow card) 45'; Khvalko (yellow card) 64'; Rodrigues (yellow card) 90'	Report	Thill 14' (yellow card) 17'; Sekidika 23'; Apeh 40'; Chakla (yellow card) 45+2'; Seydiyev 89'	Stadium: City Stadium; Attendance: 200; Referee: Rəşad Ahmadov

30 January 2024 Quarterfinal 1st leg	Sabah	1–7	Qarabağ	Masazır
19:00 AZT (UTC+4)	Volkovi (yellow card) 49'; Sekidika 63'	Report	Guseynov (yellow card) 12'; Keyta 21'; Juninho 28', 55'; Akhundzade 45+3'; Zoubir 77', 90+3'; Diakhaby 88'	Stadium: Bank Respublika Arena; Attendance: 1,575; Referee: Elçin Məsiyev

8 February 2024 Quarterfinal 2nd leg	Qarabağ	3–4 (10–5 agg.)	Sabah	Baku
20:00 AZT (UTC+4)	Keyta 30'; Silva (yellow card) 38'; Diakhaby 62'; Hadhoudi 74' (o.g.); Richard (red card) 77'	Report	Christian 5'; Margaritha 27'; Letić (yellow card) 37'; Belfodil 58', 69' (pen.)	Stadium: Tofiq Bahramov Republican Stadium; Attendance: 750; Referee: Rauf Allahverdiyev

=== Europa Conference League ===
==== Qualifying rounds ====
26 July 2023 Second qualifying round 1st leg	RFS (Latvia)	0–2	(Azerbaijan) Sabah	Jūrmala, Latvia
21:00 AZT (UTC+4)		Report	Letić 22'; Volkovi 56'; Seydiyev (yellow card) 64'; Mickels (yellow card) 88'; İmanov (yellow card) 90+6'	Stadium: Sloka Stadium; Attendance: 1,855; Referee: Jan Machálek (Czech Republic)
Note: RFS played their home match at the Sloka Stadium in Jūrmala, instead of their regular stadium, the LNK Sporta Parks in Riga, which did not meet UEFA requirements.

3 August 2023 Second qualifying round 2nd leg	Sabah (Azerbaijan)	2–1 (4–1 agg.)	(Latvia) RFS	Baku, Azerbaijan
20:00 AZT (UTC+4)	Volkovi (yellow card) 28'; Seydiyev (yellow card) 37'; Isayev (yellow card) 37'; Mickels 77'; Apeh (yellow card) 80' (goal) 90+4'; Christian (yellow card) 88'	Report	Ilić (yellow card) 4'; Zjuzins (yellow card) 30' (yellow-red card) 34'; Lipušček (yellow card) 34'; Ikaunieks 67', (yellow card) 82'; Lemajić (yellow card) 80'	Stadium: Bank Respublika Arena; Attendance: 4,730; Referee: Fedayi San (Switzerland)

10 August 2023 Third qualifying round 1st leg	Sabah (Azerbaijan)	2-0	(Serbia) Partizan	Baku, Azerbaijan
20:00 AZT (UTC+4)	Christian (yellow card) 50'; Apeh (yellow card) 51'; Isayev (penalty missed) 69, 74', (yellow card) 90+7'; Letić 70'	Report	Belić (yellow card) 4'	Stadium: Bank Respublika Arena; Attendance: 6,000; Referee: Giorgi Kruashvili (Georgia)

17 August 2023 Third qualifying round 2nd leg	Partizan (Serbia)	2–0 (a.e.t.) (2–2 agg.) (5–4 p)	(Azerbaijan) Sabah	Belgrade, Serbia
23:00 AZT (UTC+4)	Saldanha 30'; Natcho 58'; Šćekić (yellow card) 83'; Belić (yellow card) 107' (yellow-red card) 116'	Report	Letić (yellow card) 8'; Hadhoudi (yellow card) 26'; Chakla (yellow card) 57'; İmanov (yellow card) 87'; Christian (yellow card) 90+8'	Stadium: Partizan Stadium; Attendance: 14,225; Referee: Bartosz Frankowski (Poland)
	Penalties
	Pavlović (penalty scored); Nikolić (penalty scored); Kalulu (penalty scored); Antić (penalty scored); Baždar (penalty scored)		(penalty scored) Isayev; (penalty scored) Apeh; (penalty scored) C. Nuriyev; (penalty scored) Christian; (penalty missed) Ələsgərov

== Squad statistics ==
As of match played 25 May 2024

=== Appearances and goals ===
No.	Pos	Nat	Player	Total		Premier League		Azerbaijan Cup		Europa Conference League	
No.	Pos	Nat	Player	Apps	Goals	Apps	Goals	Apps	Goals	Apps	Goals
1	GK	(Azerbaijan) AZE	Yusif İmanov	31	0	23+1	0	2+1	0	4	0
2	DF	(Azerbaijan) AZE	Amin Seydiyev	39	2	32	1	3	1	4	0
3	DF	(Spain) ESP	Jon Irazabal	28	3	24+1	3	0	0	2+1	0
4	MF	(Azerbaijan) AZE	Elvin Camalov	31	0	23+3	0	2+1	0	2	0
5	DF	(Azerbaijan) AZE	Rahman Dashdamirov	14	0	8+3	0	2+1	0	0	0
6	MF	(Azerbaijan) AZE	Abdulakh Khaybulayev	2	0	0+2	0	0	0	0	0
7	DF	(Bosnia and Herzegovina) BIH	Bojan Letić	34	5	27+2	3	1	0	4	2
8	MF	(Russia) RUS	Ayaz Guliyev	25	1	13+11	1	1	0	0	0
9	MF	(Azerbaijan) AZE	Anatoliy Nuriyev	36	6	16+13	6	1+2	0	3+1	0
10	MF	(Azerbaijan) AZE	Namiq Ələsgərov	31	3	14+11	3	1+1	0	1+3	0
12	MF	(Luxembourg) LUX	Vincent Thill	22	2	13+3	1	2	1	3+1	0
14	FW	(Algeria) ALG	Ishak Belfodil	21	5	13+5	3	1+2	2	0	0
15	MF	(Brazil) BRA	Christian	37	2	20+10	1	3	1	4	0
16	GK	(Azerbaijan) AZE	Rustam Samiqullin	2	0	2	0	0	0	0	0
17	DF	(Azerbaijan) AZE	Tellur Mutallimov	32	3	15+12	3	2+1	0	0+2	0
18	FW	(Georgia (country)) GEO	Davit Volkovi	33	7	11+17	6	1	0	3+1	1
19	FW	(Nigeria) NGR	Emmanuel Apeh	38	5	15+16	3	2+1	1	1+3	1
21	MF	(Azerbaijan) AZE	Ildar Alekperov	5	0	0+4	0	0	0	0+1	0
24	DF	(Morocco) MAR	Marouane Hadhoudi	18	0	13+1	0	2	0	2	0
27	FW	(Curaçao) CUW	Jearl Margaritha	23	1	6+12	0	1+1	1	2+1	0
28	MF	(Jamaica) JAM	Kaheem Parris	35	4	24+9	4	1+1	0	0	0
33	FW	(Azerbaijan) AZE	Jamal Jafarov	1	0	0+1	0	0	0	0	0
40	DF	(Azerbaijan) AZE	Rauf Rustamli	2	0	0+2	0	0	0	0	0
44	DF	(Morocco) MAR	Sofian Chakla	38	3	30+2	3	2	0	4	0
55	GK	(Azerbaijan) AZE	Nijat Mehbaliyev	12	0	11	0	1	0	0	0
70	MF	(Nigeria) NGR	Jesse Sekidika	34	7	26+5	5	2+1	2	0	0
88	MF	(Azerbaijan) AZE	Khayal Aliyev	13	0	4+8	0	0+1	0	0	0
90	FW	(Nigeria) NGR	Timilehin Oluwaseun	2	0	0+2	0	0	0	0	0
Players away on loan:
Players who left Sabah during the season:
10	MF	(Azerbaijan) AZE	Aleksey Isayev	22	2	17	1	0+1	0	4	1
20	MF	(Germany) GER	Joy-Lance Mickels	3	2	0+1	1	0	0	1+1	1
29	MF	(Azerbaijan) AZE	Ceyhun Nuriyev	5	0	0+3	0	0	0	0+2	0

=== Goal scorers ===
Place	Position	Nation	Number	Name	Premier League	Azerbaijan Cup	Europa Conference League	Total
1	FW	(Georgia (country))	18	Davit Volkovi	6	0	1	7
1	MF	(Nigeria)	70	Jesse Sekidika	5	2	0	7
3	MF	(Azerbaijan)	9	Anatoliy Nuriyev	6	0	0	6
4	FW	(Algeria)	14	Ishak Belfodil	3	2	0	5
4	DF	(Bosnia and Herzegovina)	7	Bojan Letić	3	0	2	5
4	FW	(Nigeria)	19	Emmanuel Apeh	3	1	1	5
7	MF	(Jamaica)	28	Kaheem Parris	4	0	0	4
8	DF	(Morocco)	44	Sofian Chakla	3	0	0	3
8	DF	(Azerbaijan)	17	Tellur Mutallimov	3	0	0	3
8	DF	(Spain)	3	Jon Irazabal	3	0	0	3
8	MF	(Azerbaijan)	10	Namiq Ələsgərov	3	0	0	3
12	MF	(Luxembourg)	12	Vincent Thill	1	1	0	2
12	MF	(Brazil)	15	Christian	1	1	0	2
12	DF	(Azerbaijan)	2	Amin Seydiyev	1	1	0	2
12	FW	(Germany)	20	Joy-Lance Mickels	1	0	1	2
12	MF	(Azerbaijan)	10	Aleksey Isayev	1	0	1	2
12				Own goal	2	0	0	2
18	MF	(Russia)	8	Ayaz Guliyev	1	0	0	1
18	FW	(Curaçao)	27	Jearl Margaritha	0	1	0	1
				TOTALS	50	9	6	65

=== Clean sheets ===
Place	Position	Nation	Number	Name	Premier League	Azerbaijan Cup	Europa Conference League	Total
1	GK	(Azerbaijan)	1	Yusif Imanov	8	0	2	10
2	GK	(Azerbaijan)	55	Nijat Mehbaliyev	4	0	0	4
				TOTALS	11	0	2	13

Nijat Mehbaliyev & Yusif Imanov both played in Sabah's 4-0 victory over Sabail on 10 December 2023

=== Disciplinary record ===
Number	Nation	Position	Name	Premier League		Azerbaijan Cup		Europa Conference League		Total	
Number	Nation	Position	Name	Yellow card	Red card	Yellow card	Red card	Yellow card	Red card	Yellow card	Red card
1	(Azerbaijan)	GK	Yusif Imanov	2	0	0	0	2	0	4	0
2	(Azerbaijan)	DF	Amin Seydiyev	8	1	0	0	2	0	10	1
3	(Spain)	DF	Jon Irazabal	8	1	0	0	0	0	8	1
4	(Azerbaijan)	MF	Elvin Camalov	10	1	0	0	0	0	10	1
6	(Azerbaijan)	MF	Abdulakh Khaybulayev	1	1	0	0	0	0	1	1
7	(Bosnia and Herzegovina)	DF	Bojan Letić	7	1	1	0	1	0	7	1
8	(Russia)	MF	Ayaz Guliyev	5	0	0	0	0	0	5	0
9	(Azerbaijan)	MF	Anatoliy Nuriyev	6	0	0	0	0	0	6	0
10	(Azerbaijan)	MF	Namiq Ələsgərov	1	0	0	0	0	0	1	0
12	(Luxembourg)	MF	Vincent Thill	5	0	1	0	0	0	6	0
15	(Brazil)	MF	Christian	6	0	0	0	3	0	9	0
17	(Azerbaijan)	DF	Tellur Mutallimov	1	0	0	0	0	0	1	0
18	(Georgia (country))	FW	Davit Volkovi	0	1	1	0	1	0	2	1
19	(Nigeria)	FW	Emmanuel Apeh	5	1	0	0	2	0	7	1
24	(Morocco)	DF	Marouane Hadhoudi	5	0	0	0	1	0	6	0
27	(Curaçao)	FW	Jearl Margaritha	1	0	0	0	0	0	1	0
28	(Jamaica)	MF	Kaheem Parris	3	1	0	0	0	0	3	1
44	(Morocco)	DF	Sofian Chakla	9	0	1	0	1	0	11	0
70	(Nigeria)	MF	Jesse Sekidika	1	0	0	0	0	0	1	0
88	(Azerbaijan)	MF	Khayal Aliyev	1	0	0	0	0	0	1	0
Players away on loan:
Players who left Sabah during the season:
10	(Azerbaijan)	MF	Aleksey Isayev	1	0	0	0	2	0	3	0
20	(Germany)	MF	Joy-Lance Mickels	0	0	0	0	1	0	1	0
29	(Azerbaijan)	MF	Ceyhun Nuriyev	1	0	0	0	0	0	1	0
			TOTALS	87	8	4	0	16	0	107	8
