= 2023–24 Turan Tovuz season =

Turan Tovuz
2023-24 season
- Chairman: Ehtiram Guliyev
- Manager: Aykhan Abbasov
- Stadium: City Stadium
- Premier League: 6th
- Azerbaijan Cup: Last 16 vs Zira
- Top goalscorer: League: Otto John (10); All: Otto John (11)

The Turan Tovuz 2023–24 season was Turan Tovuz's second season back in the Azerbaijan Premier League, and their twenty-fourth season overall.

== Season events ==
On 20 June, Turan Tovuz announced the signing of Aydın Bayramov from Sumgayit and Farid Nabiyev from Kapaz. The following day, 21 June, Sertan Taşqın joined from Zira.

On 30 June, Turan Tovuz announced the signing of Martin Petkov from Septemvri Sofia.

On 7 July, Turan Tovuz announced the signing of Brunão from Leixões, Pachu from Trofense and Otto John from Dukagjini.

On 10 July, Turan Tovuz announced the signing of Budag Nasirov.

On 11 August, Turan Tovuz announced the signing of Slavik Alkhasov from Zira.

On 6 September, Neftçi loaned Khayal Najafov to Turan Tovuz for the season.

On 14 September, Turan Tovuz announced the signing of Emmanuel Hackman from Mladost Novi Sad.

On 11 January, Turan Tovuz announced that Sertan Taşqın had left the club by mutual consent to allow him to join TFF First League club Manisa.

On 12 January, Turan Tovuz announced the signing of Alex Souza from Hegelmann.

On 19 January, Ismayil Zulfugarli and Farid Yusifli joined Turan Tovuz on loan for the rest of the season from Neftçi.

== Squad ==
As of match played 26 May 2024

No.	Name	Nationality	Position	Date of birth (age)	Signed from	Signed in	Contract ends	Apps.	Goals
Goalkeepers
1	Tarlan Ahmadli	(Azerbaijan)	GK	21 November 1994 (aged 29)	Sumgayit	2022		32	0
13	Aydın Bayramov	(Azerbaijan)	GK	18 February 1996 (aged 28)	Sumgayit	2023		29	0
85	Kamal Bayramov	(Azerbaijan)	GK	19 August 1985 (aged 38)	Shamakhi	2022			
Defenders
3	Tarlan Guliyev	(Azerbaijan)	DF	19 April 1992 (aged 32)	Shamakhi	2022		31	2
4	Şehriyar Aliyev	(Azerbaijan)	DF	25 December 1992 (aged 31)	Shamakhi	2022		62	4
5	Roderick Miller	(Panama)	DF	3 April 1992 (aged 32)	Al-Minaa	2023	2023 (+1)	35	6
6	Brunão	(Brazil)	DF	8 October 1997 (aged 26)	Leixões	2023		33	2
14	Slavik Alkhasov	(Azerbaijan)	DF	6 February 1993 (aged 31)	Zira	2023		7	0
15	Emmanuel Hackman	(Togo)	DF	14 May 1995 (aged 29)	Mladost Novi Sad	2023		26	2
25	Denis Marandici	(Moldova)	DF	18 September 1996 (aged 27)	Zrinjski Mostar	2023	2024	50	2
33	Eltun Turabov	(Azerbaijan)	DF	18 February 1997 (aged 27)	Sabah	2022		26	0
39	Sadig Guliyev	(Azerbaijan)	DF	9 March 1995 (aged 29)	Machhindra	2022		31	1
57	Javid Qasimov	(Azerbaijan)	DF	30 August 2005 (aged 18)	Youth Team	2023		1	0
83	Hüseyn Hüseynov	(Azerbaijan)	DF	25 July 2006 (aged 17)	Youth team	2023		1	0
88	Faig Hajiyev	(Azerbaijan)	DF	22 May 1999 (aged 25)	Gabala	2021			
Midfielders
2	Ismayil Zulfugarli	(Azerbaijan)	MF	16 April 2001 (aged 23)	on loan from Neftçi	2024	2024	17	0
8	Farid Yusifli	(Azerbaijan)	MF	20 February 2002 (aged 22)	on loan from Neftçi	2024	2024	10	0
10	Khayal Najafov	(Azerbaijan)	MF	19 December 1997 (aged 26)	on loan from Neftçi	2023	2024	66	3
11	Aykhan Guseynov	(Russia)	MF	3 September 1999 (aged 24)	Khimki	2022		70	10
18	Budag Nasirov	(Azerbaijan)	MF	15 July 1996 (aged 27)	Unattached	2023		18	0
23	Álex Serrano	(Spain)	MF	6 February 1995 (aged 29)	Hebar Pazardzhik	2023		36	1
60	Sabayel Bagirov	(Azerbaijan)	MF	5 March 1996 (aged 28)	Diyarbakir Yol	2019			
70	Mazahir Mammadzada	(Azerbaijan)	MF	12 August 2002 (aged 21)	Academy	2023		3	0
71	Sanan Aslanov	(Azerbaijan)	MF		Academy	2023		1	0
77	Farid Nabiyev	(Azerbaijan)	MF	22 July 1999 (aged 24)	Kapaz	2023		33	6
99	Veysal Rzayev	(Azerbaijan)	MF	24 October 2002 (aged 21)	on loan from Sabah	2023		57	0
Forwards
7	Pachu	(Brazil)	FW	26 February 1996 (aged 28)	Trofense	2023	2025	24	5
9	Belajdi Pusi	(Albania)	FW	23 January 1998 (aged 26)	Skënderbeu Korçë	2023	2023 (+1)	53	7
21	Alex Souza	(Brazil)	FW	24 March 2001 (aged 23)	Hegelmann	2024		18	6
80	Otto John	(Nigeria)	FW	25 January 1998 (aged 26)	Dukagjini	2023		37	11
97	Sadiq Shafiyev	(Azerbaijan)	FW	13 October 2005 (aged 18)	Academy	2023		5	0
Out on loan
Left during the season
2	Sertan Taşqın	(Azerbaijan)	DF	8 October 1997 (aged 26)	Zira	2023		18	1
8	Piruz Marakvelidze	(Georgia (country))	MF	21 January 1995 (aged 29)	Telavi	2022		28	0
79	Martin Petkov	(Bulgaria)	FW	15 August 2002 (aged 21)	Septemvri Sofia	2023		16	3

== Transfers ==
=== In ===
Date	Position	Nationality	Name	From	Fee	Ref.
20 June 2023	GK	(Azerbaijan)	Aydın Bayramov	Sumgayit	Undisclosed	
20 June 2023	MF	(Azerbaijan)	Farid Nabiyev	Kapaz	Undisclosed	
21 June 2023	DF	(Azerbaijan)	Sertan Taşqın	Zira	Undisclosed	
30 June 2023	FW	(Bulgaria)	Martin Petkov	Septemvri Sofia	Undisclosed	
7 July 2023	DF	(Brazil)	Brunão	Leixões	Undisclosed	
7 July 2023	FW	(Brazil)	Pachu	Trofense	Undisclosed	
7 July 2023	FW	(Nigeria)	Otto John	Dukagjini	Undisclosed	
10 July 2023	FW	(Azerbaijan)	Budag Nasirov	Unattached	Free	
11 August 2023	DF	(Azerbaijan)	Slavik Alkhasov	Zira	Undisclosed	
14 August 2023	MF	(Togo)	Emmanuel Hackman	Mladost Novi Sad	Undisclosed	
12 January 2024	FW	(Brazil)	Alex Souza	Hegelmann	Undisclosed	

=== Loans in ===
Date from	Position	Nationality	Name	From	Date to	Ref.
6 September 2023	MF	(Azerbaijan)	Khayal Najafov	Neftçi	End of season	
19 January 2024	DF	(Azerbaijan)	Ismayil Zulfugarli	Neftçi	End of season	
19 January 2024	MF	(Azerbaijan)	Farid Yusifli	Neftçi	End of season	

=== Out ===
Date	Position	Nationality	Name	To	Fee	Ref.
30 July 2023	GK	(Azerbaijan)	Mehman Hajiyev	Imishli	Undisclosed	
23 August 2023	DF	(Azerbaijan)	Vusal Masimov	Kapaz	Undisclosed	

=== Released ===
Date	Position	Nationality	Name	Joined	Date	Ref
7 July 2023	MF	(Azerbaijan)	Ehtiram Shahverdiyev	Kapaz		
11 January 2024	DF	(Azerbaijan)	Sertan Taşqın	Manisa	11 January 2024	
24 January 2024	FW	(Bulgaria)	Martin Petkov	Lokomotiv Plovdiv		
31 May 2024	GK	(Azerbaijan)	Tarlan Ahmadli	Araz-Naxçıvan	1 June 2024	
31 May 2024	GK	(Azerbaijan)	Aydın Bayramov	Zira	5 June 2024	
31 May 2024	GK	(Azerbaijan)	Kamal Bayramov	Shamakhi	1 July 2024	
31 May 2024	DF	(Azerbaijan)	Slavik Alkhasov	Araz-Naxçıvan	7 August 2024	
31 May 2024	DF	(Azerbaijan)	Tarlan Guliyev	Imishli		
31 May 2024	MF	(Azerbaijan)	Farid Nabiyev	Sabail	4 June 2024	
31 May 2024	FW	(Albania)	Belajdi Pusi	Shamakhi	18 June 2024	

== Friendlies ==
9 January 2024	Voluntari	2–0	Turan Tovuz	Antalya, Turkey
17:00 AZT (UTC+4)	Florea 55'; Cocian 76'	Report

15 January 2024	Turan Tovuz	0–2	Siófok	Antalya, Turkey
12:00 AZT (UTC+4)		Report		Stadium: Fanatic Tour Sport Center

15 January 2024	Turan Tovuz	2–4	Nasaf	Antalya, Turkey
17:00 AZT (UTC+4)		Report

== Competitions ==
=== Overview ===
Competition	First match	Last match	Starting round	Final position	Record							
Competition	First match	Last match	Starting round	Final position	Pld	W	D	L	GF	GA	GD	Win %
Premier League	5 August 2023	26 May 2024	Matchday 1	6th	36	13	9	14	53	53	+0	36.11
Azerbaijan Cup	28 November 2023	20 December 2023	Second Round	Last 16	2	1	0	1	6	3	+3	50.00
Total					38	14	9	15	59	56	+3	36.84

Last updated: 17 May 2024
Source: Competitions

=== Premier League ===
==== Results summary ====
Overall								Home						Away					
Pld	W	D	L	GF	GA	GD	Pts	W	D	L	GF	GA	GD	W	D	L	GF	GA	GD
36	13	9	14	53	53	0	48	8	4	6	31	26	+5	5	5	8	22	27	−5

Last updated: 26 May 2024.
Source: See Results

==== Results by round ====
Round	1	2	3	4	5	6	7	8	9	10	11	12	13	14	15	16	17	18	19	20	21	22	23	24	25	26	27	28	29	30	31	32	33	34	35	36
Ground	A	A	A	H	A	H	A	H	A	H	H	A	H	A	H	A	H	H	A	H	A	H	A	H	A	H	H	A	H	A	H	A	H	A	A	H
Result	W	L	W	L	W	D	D	L	L	D	W	L	L	L	D	L	W	W	L	W	D	W	D	D	D	W	L	D	W	W	L	L	L	W	L	W
Position	3	5	4	4	2	4	4	6	6	6	6	7	8	8	8	8	8	7	8	8	8	7	8	6	7	7	7	7	6	5	7	7	7	6	6	6

Updated to match(es) played on 26 May 2024. Source: See Results
A = Away; H = Home; W = Win; D = Draw; L = Loss

==== Results ====
4 August 2023 1	Araz-Naxçıvan	0–3	Turan Tovuz	Baku
20:00 AZT (UTC+4)	Suleymanov (yellow card) 82'	Report	Miller (yellow card) 45+1'; Petkov 53', 87' (yellow card) 90+4'; John 68'; Rzayev (yellow card) 85'	Stadium: Dalga Arena; Referee: Ingilab Mammadov

13 August 2023 2	Qarabağ	3–0	Turan Tovuz	Baku
18:30 AZT (UTC+4)	Juninho 30'; Mammadov (yellow card) 33'; Zoubir 66'; Diakhaby 69'; Romão (yellow card) 82'	Report	Miller (yellow card) 37'; Rzayev (yellow card) 90+3'	Stadium: Azersun Arena; Referee: Rauf Allahverdiyev

18 August 2023 3	Kapaz	0–2	Turan Tovuz	Ganja
17:00 AZT (UTC+4)	Onanuga (yellow card) 61'	Report	Petkov 18'; Pusi 21'; Marakvelidze (yellow card) 61'	Stadium: City Stadium; Referee: Javid Jəlilov

26 August 2023 4	Turan Tovuz	1–3	Sabail	Tovuz
17:00 AZT (UTC+4)	Miller 84'	Report	Ramalingom 5'; Gomis (yellow card) 44'; Nabiyev 62'; Ramazanov 90'	Stadium: City Stadium; Referee: Tural Qurbanov

1 September 2023 5	Sabah	0–3	Turan Tovuz	Masazır
19:00 AZT (UTC+4)	Thill (yellow card) 45'; Isayev (yellow card) 45+1'; Hadhoudi (yellow card) 55'; Camalov (yellow card) 60'; Nuriyev (yellow card) 77'	Report	Miller 19'; Aliyev 57'; Pusi (yellow card) 60' (goal) 79'	Stadium: Bank Respublika Arena; Referee: Rauf Jabarov

17 September 2023 6	Turan Tovuz	2–2	Gabala	Tovuz
16:30 AZT (UTC+4)	Rzayev (yellow card) 45+2'; Nabiyev 56'; Pusi 59' (yellow card) 73'; Aliyev (yellow card) 62'	Report	Hüseynli (yellow card) 37'; Isgandarov (yellow card) 62'; Khalaila 71', 78' (pen.) (yellow card) 73'	Stadium: City Stadium; Referee: Aliyar Ağayev

23 September 2023 7	Sumgayit	0–0	Turan Tovuz	Sumgait
18:00 AZT (UTC+4)	Kahat (yellow card) 17'; Mustafayev (yellow card) 53'	Report	Guseynov (yellow card) 77'	Stadium: Kapital Bank Arena; Referee: Kamal Umudlu

30 September 2023 8	Turan Tovuz	0–1	Neftçi	Tovuz
16:00 AZT (UTC+4)	Rzayev (yellow card) 90+1'	Report	Haghverdi (yellow card) 84'; Olanare 87' (yellow card) 90+1'	Stadium: City Stadium; Referee: Emin Aliyev

6 October 2023 9	Zira	2–1	Turan Tovuz	Zirə
18:00 AZT (UTC+4)	Soumah 34'; Alıyev (yellow card) 59' (goal) 77'	Report	Marandici 74'	Stadium: Zira Olympic Sport Complex Stadium; Referee: Ingilab Mammadov

20 October 2023 10	Turan Tovuz	2–2	Qarabağ	Tovuz
18:30 AZT (UTC+4)	Hajiyev (yellow card) 14'; Miller (yellow card) 29'; John 46'; Pachu (yellow card) 56'; Guseynov 90+4', (yellow card) 90+5'; Najafov (yellow card) 90+5'	Report	Juninho 7'; Romão (yellow card) 44'; L.Andrade 90'; Bayramov (yellow card) 90+1'	Stadium: City Stadium; Referee: Farid Hajiyev

28 October 2023 11	Turan Tovuz	4–0	Kapaz	Tovuz
19:00 AZT (UTC+4)	John 45'; Miller 54'; Taşqın 58'; Pachu 67'	Report	Fall (yellow card) 25'; Kvirkvia (yellow card) 38'; Shahverdiyev (yellow card) 55'; Ahmadov (yellow card) 55'	Stadium: City Stadium; Referee: Ingilab Mammadov

3 November 2023 12	Sabail	2–1	Turan Tovuz	Baku
19:00 AZT (UTC+4)	Ağayev (yellow card) 38'; Abdullazade 47'; Ramalingom 78' (pen.)	Report	John 27'; Miller (yellow card) 54'; Marandici (yellow card) 75'; Hajiyev (yellow card) 90+3'; Aliyev (yellow card) 90+4'; Brunão (yellow card) 90+4'	Stadium: Bayil Arena; Referee: Kamranbay Rahimov

11 November 2023 13	Turan Tovuz	2–3	Sabah	Tovuz
19:00 AZT (UTC+4)	Pachu (yellow card) 24'; Nabiyev 35' (pen.); Brunão 38'	Report	Volkovi 9', 25', 42'; Camalov (yellow card) 59'; Irazabal (yellow card) 79'; Sekidika (yellow card) 90+4'	Stadium: City Stadium; Referee: Aliyar Ağayev

25 November 2023 14	Gabala	4–0	Turan Tovuz	Qabala
16:00 AZT (UTC+4)	Aouacheria 42', 49', 85'; Tetteh 53' (yellow card) 77'; Abbasov (yellow card) 55'; Azizli (yellow card) 89'	Report	Marandici (yellow card) 72'	Stadium: City Stadium; Referee: Ravan Hamzazada

2 December 2023 15	Turan Tovuz	2–2	Sumgayit	Tovuz
18:30 AZT (UTC+4)	Miller (yellow card) 34'; Pachu 49' (yellow card) 77'; John 53'; Nasirov (yellow card) 66'; Hajiyev (yellow card) 74'	Report	Badalov 6', 36'; Abdullazade (yellow card) 90+5'; Khachayev (yellow card) 90+5'	Stadium: City Stadium; Referee: Elcin Masiyev

10 December 2023 16	Neftçi	3–2	Turan Tovuz	Baku
18:00 AZT (UTC+4)	Ozobić 5' (yellow card) 43'; Lebon (yellow card) 22'; Salahlı (yellow card) 47'; Hajiyev 56'; Olanare 73'	Report	Miller 9'; Serrano (yellow card) 22'; John 59'; Brunão (yellow card) 79'	Stadium: Neftçi Arena; Referee: Aliyar Ağayev

16 December 2023 17	Turan Tovuz	1–0	Zira	Tovuz
18:00 AZT (UTC+4)	Hajiyev (yellow card) 8'; Nabiyev 76'; Bayramov (yellow card) 89'	Report	Zebli (yellow card) 70'; Kulach (yellow card) 77'; Alıyev (yellow card) 89'	Stadium: City Stadium; Referee: Elcin Masiyev

24 December 2023 18	Turan Tovuz	3–1	Araz-Naxçıvan	Tovuz
12:00 AZT (UTC+4)	Najafov 4'; Brunão 16'; Serrano (yellow card) 26'; Guseynov 90'	Report	Wanderson (yellow card) 35'; Azzaoui 58' (pen.)	Stadium: City Stadium; Referee: Ravan Hamzazada

22 January 2024 19	Kapaz	2–1	Turan Tovuz	Ganja
17:30 AZT (UTC+4)	Papunashvili (yellow card) 23'; Hasanov (yellow card) 23'; Seyidov 25'; Masimov (yellow card) 50'; Martin Júnior 71'	Report	Guseynov 4'; Hajiyev (red card) 9'; Turabov (yellow card) 23'; Miller (yellow card) 76'	Stadium: City Stadium; Referee: Ali Aliyev

26 January 2024 20	Turan Tovuz	3–1	Sabail	Tovuz
15:00 AZT (UTC+4)	Aliyev (yellow card) 21'; Guseynov 24'; Pachu 73', 86'	Report	Ramalingom (yellow card) 14'; Naghiyev (yellow card) 56'; Nuno 81'	Stadium: City Stadium

3 February 2024 21	Sabah	1–1	Turan Tovuz	Masazır
17:30 AZT (UTC+4)	Parris 23'; Seydiyev (yellow card) 29'; Christian (yellow card) 44'; Nuriyev (yellow card) 70'	Report	Souza 11'; Aliyev (yellow card) 41'; Nabiyev (yellow card) 90+4'; Najafov (yellow card) 90+5'	Stadium: Bank Respublika Arena; Referee: Ingilab Mammadov

13 February 2024 22	Turan Tovuz	2–1	Gabala	Tovuz
15:00 AZT (UTC+4)	Souza 43'; Brunão (yellow card) 47'; Guseynov 53'; Serrano (yellow card) 85'; Bayramov (yellow card) 90+5'	Report	Hüseynli (yellow card) 50'; Aouacheria 77'; Akakpo (yellow card) 82'; Abramov (yellow card) 84'	Stadium: City Stadium; Referee: Rauf Allahverdiyev

18 February 2024 23	Sumgayit	0–0	Turan Tovuz	Sumgait
15:30 AZT (UTC+4)	Mossi (yellow card) 12'; Murata (yellow card) 73'	Report	Rzayev (yellow card) 60'	Stadium: Kapital Bank Arena; Referee: Rauf Jabarov

24 February 2024 24	Turan Tovuz	1–1	Neftçi	Tovuz
15:00 AZT (UTC+4)	Guseynov (yellow card) 35'; Hajiyev (yellow card) 72'; Nabiyev 89'; Aliyev (yellow card) 89'	Report	Haghverdi (yellow card) 54'; Bogomolsky 72' (yellow card) 80'; Salahlı (yellow card) 90+4'	Stadium: City Stadium; Referee: Tural Qurbanov

2 March 2024 25	Zira	1–1	Turan Tovuz	Zirə
16:00 AZT (UTC+4)	Soumah (yellow card) 27'; Djibrilla (red card) 43'; Nuriyev 62' (pen.)	Report	Pusi 12'; Yusifli (yellow card) 53'; Aliyev (yellow card) 62'; Guseynov (yellow card) 66'	Stadium: Zira Olympic Sport Complex Stadium; Referee: Ravan Hamzazada

10 March 2024 26	Turan Tovuz	2–0	Araz-Naxçıvan	Tovuz
15:30 AZT (UTC+4)	Hackman (yellow card) 61'; Miller (yellow card) 69'; Souza 78', 80'; Brunão (yellow card) 87'; Turabov (yellow card) 87'; Alkhasov (yellow card) 90+3'; Bayramov (yellow card) 90+6'	Report	Manafov (yellow card) 38'; Shabanov (red card) 78' Igor (yellow card) 79'; Kurdić (yellow card) 80'; Abdullayev (yellow card) 87'	Stadium: City Stadium; Referee: Raad Ahmadov

17 March 2024 27	Turan Tovuz	1–3	Qarabağ	Tovuz
16:00 AZT (UTC+4)	John 9' (pen.); Yusifli (yellow card) 13'; Alkhasov (yellow card) 38'	Report	P.Andrade (yellow card) 15' (goal) 73'; Akhundzade 56'; Gugeshashvili (yellow card) 64'; Bayramov 90+5' (pen.)	Stadium: City Stadium; Referee: Tural Qurbanov

30 March 2024 28	Sabail	1–1	Turan Tovuz	Baku
15:30 AZT (UTC+4)	Nuno 21'	Report	Najafov (yellow card) 31'; Hackman (yellow card) 39'; Nabiyev 45+4' (pen.); Brunão (yellow card) 55'; Pachu (yellow card) 59'	Stadium: Bayil Arena; Referee: Ravan Hamzazada

6 April 2024 29	Turan Tovuz	2–0	Sabah	Tovuz
16:00 AZT (UTC+4)	Souza 26'; Serrano (yellow card) 43'; John 82'; Bayramov (yellow card) 90+4'	Report	Guliyev (yellow card) 8'; Chakla (yellow card) 81'	Stadium: City Stadium; Referee: Aliyar Ağayev

13 April 2024 30	Gabala	1–2	Turan Tovuz	Qabala
16:30 AZT (UTC+4)	Atangana (yellow card) 5'; Allach 49'; Aouacheria (yellow card) 71'; Hüseynli (yellow card) 90'; Qirtimov (yellow card) 90+3'	Report	Najafov (yellow card) 20'; Hajiyev (yellow card) 74'; Souza 81'; Pusi 90+5' (yellow card) 90+6'; John (yellow card) 90+6'; Guliyev (yellow card) 90+6'	Stadium: City Stadium; Referee: Rauf Jabarov

19 April 2024 31	Turan Tovuz	1–4	Sumgayit	Tovuz
16:30 AZT (UTC+4)	Serrano (yellow card) 8'; John 51' (pen.) (yellow card) 67'; Marandici (yellow card) 85'; Guseynov (yellow card) 90'	Report	Aliyev 16' (o.g.); Sorga 24' (yellow card) 43'; Rezabala (yellow card) 86' (goal) 90+5'; Suliman (yellow card) 87'; Abdullazade 88'; Dzhenetov (yellow card) 90+4'	Stadium: City Stadium; Referee: Aliyar Ağayev

28 April 2024 32	Neftçi	3–0	Turan Tovuz	Baku
17:45 AZT (UTC+4)	Ozobić 15' (yellow card) 23'; Matias 31' (pen.); Hajiyev (yellow card) 32' (goal) 70' (pen.); Eddy (yellow card) 81'	Report	Brunão (yellow card) 29' (red card) 63'; Alkhasov (yellow card) 69'	Stadium: Neftçi Arena; Referee: Ravan Hamzazada

5 May 2024 33	Turan Tovuz	1–2	Zira	Tovuz
16:30 AZT (UTC+4)	Nabiyev 53'; Miller (red card) 90+9'	Report	Sadykhov (yellow card) 2'; Soumah 14'; Meza 70' (yellow card) 90+5'; Silva (yellow card) 90+6'; Nazirov (yellow card) 90+7'; Acka (yellow card) 90+9'	Stadium: City Stadium; Referee: Elcin Məsiyev

11 May 2024 34	Araz-Naxçıvan	0–1	Turan Tovuz	Baku
17:00 AZT (UTC+4)	Rodrigues (yellow card) 66'; Kurdić (yellow card) 90+1'; Kuzmanović (yellow card) 90+5'	Report	Serrano 63'; Guliyev (yellow card) 71'; Marandici (yellow card) 90+5'	Stadium: Dalga Arena; Referee: Kamal Umudlu

17 May 2024 35	Qarabağ	4–3	Turan Tovuz	Baku
20:30 AZT (UTC+4)	L.Andrade 19'; L.Andrade 69', 90'; Silva 75'	Report	Hackman 48', 86'; Pachu 53'; Rzayev (yellow card) 55'	Stadium: Tofiq Bahramov Republican Stadium; Referee: Javid Jalilov

26 May 2024 36	Turan Tovuz	1–0	Kapaz	Tovuz
14:00 AZT (UTC+4)	Zulfugarli (yellow card) 26'; Hackman (yellow card) 61'; John 74'; Bayramov (yellow card) 90+3'	Report	Musayev (yellow card) 24'; Kvirkvia (yellow card) 67'	Stadium: City Stadium; Referee: Raad Ahmadov

==== League table ====
Pos	Team	Pld	W	D	L	GF	GA	GD	Pts	Qualification or relegation
4	Sumgayit	36	15	12	9	37	38	−1	57	Qualification for the Conference League second qualifying round
5	Neftçi	36	16	8	12	51	40	+11	56	
6	Turan Tovuz	36	13	9	14	53	53	0	48	
7	Sabail	36	11	9	16	50	60	−10	42	
8	Araz-Naxçıvan	36	9	9	18	31	50	−19	36	

Source: Soccerway
Rules for classification: 1) Points; 2) Head-to-head points; 3) Head-to-head goal difference; 4) Head-to-head goals scored; 5) Head-to-head away goals scored (only if two teams); 6) Goal difference; 7) Goals scored.

=== Azerbaijan Cup ===
28 November 2023 Second Round	Turan Tovuz	5–1	Göygöl	Tovuz
17:00 AZT (UTC+4)	Guseynov 4', 45'; Pusi 41', 88'; Guliyev (yellow card) 45' (goal) 90+2' (pen.); Nasirov (yellow card) 80'	Report	Jalilov 38' (pen.); Mammadov (yellow card) 90'; Mursalov (yellow card) 90+1'	Stadium: City Stadium; Attendance: 1,500; Referee: Tural Gurbanov

20 December 2023 Last 16	Zira	2–1	Turan Tovuz	Zirə
17:00 AZT (UTC+4)	Soumah (yellow card) 64'; Chantakias (yellow card) 78'; Pachtmann 82'; Akhmedzade 89' (yellow card) 90'; Kulach (yellow card) 90+9'	Report	John 4'; Najafov (yellow card) 83'; Miller (yellow card) 90'	Stadium: Zira Olympic Sport Complex Stadium; Attendance: 800; Referee: Inqilab Mammadov

== Squad statistics ==
As of match played 26 May 2024

=== Appearances and goals ===
No.	Pos	Nat	Player	Total		Premier League		Azerbaijan Cup	
No.	Pos	Nat	Player	Apps	Goals	Apps	Goals	Apps	Goals
1	GK	(Azerbaijan) AZE	Tarlan Ahmadli	3	0	2+1	0	0	0
2	MF	(Azerbaijan) AZE	Ismayil Zulfugarli	17	0	14+3	0	0	0
3	DF	(Azerbaijan) AZE	Tarlan Guliyev	4	1	2+1	0	1	1
4	DF	(Azerbaijan) AZE	Şehriyar Aliyev	25	1	22+2	1	1	0
5	DF	(Panama) PAN	Roderick Miller	27	4	25+1	4	1	0
6	DF	(Brazil) BRA	Brunão	33	2	33	2	0	0
7	FW	(Brazil) BRA	Pachu	24	5	18+5	5	1	0
8	MF	(Azerbaijan) AZE	Farid Yusifli	10	0	5+5	0	0	0
9	FW	(Albania) ALB	Belajdi Pusi	33	7	12+19	5	1+1	2
10	MF	(Azerbaijan) AZE	Khayal Najafov	28	1	18+9	1	0+1	0
11	MF	(Russia) RUS	Aykhan Guseynov	35	7	13+20	5	2	2
13	GK	(Azerbaijan) AZE	Aydın Bayramov	29	0	29	0	0	0
14	DF	(Azerbaijan) AZE	Slavik Alkhasov	7	0	5+2	0	0	0
15	DF	(Togo) TOG	Emmanuel Hackman	26	2	19+5	2	2	0
18	MF	(Azerbaijan) AZE	Budag Nasirov	3	0	0+2	0	0+1	0
21	FW	(Brazil) BRA	Alex Souza	18	6	12+6	6	0	0
23	MF	(Spain) ESP	Álex Serrano	36	1	35	1	1	0
25	DF	(Moldova) MDA	Denis Marandici	33	1	32	1	1	0
39	DF	(Azerbaijan) AZE	Sadig Guliyev	6	0	0+5	0	1	0
57	DF	(Azerbaijan) AZE	Javid Qasimov	1	0	0+1	0	0	0
60	MF	(Azerbaijan) AZE	Sabayel Bagirov	1	0	0	0	1	0
70	MF	(Azerbaijan) AZE	Mazahir Mammadzada	3	0	0+2	0	0+1	0
71		(Azerbaijan) AZE	Sanan Aslanov	1	0	0	0	0+1	0
77	MF	(Azerbaijan) AZE	Farid Nabiyev	33	6	23+8	6	0+2	0
80	FW	(Nigeria) NGR	Otto John	37	11	18+18	10	1	1
85	GK	(Azerbaijan) AZE	Kamal Bayramov	7	0	5	0	2	0
88	DF	(Azerbaijan) AZE	Faig Hajiyev	35	0	19+14	0	2	0
97	FW	(Azerbaijan) AZE	Sadiq Shafiyev	5	0	0+4	0	0+1	0
99	MF	(Azerbaijan) AZE	Veysal Rzayev	30	0	15+13	0	1+1	0
Players away on loan:
Players who left Sumgayit during the season:
2	DF	(Azerbaijan) AZE	Sertan Taşqın	18	1	11+5	1	1+1	0
8	MF	(Georgia (country)) GEO	Piruz Marakvelidze	6	0	2+4	0	0	0
79	FW	(Bulgaria) BUL	Martin Petkov	16	3	8+6	3	1+1	0

=== Goal scorers ===
Place	Position	Nation	Number	Name	Premier League	Azerbaijan Cup	Total
1	FW	(Nigeria)	80	Otto John	10	1	11
2	MF	(Russia)	11	Aykhan Guseynov	5	2	7
2	FW	(Albania)	9	Belajdi Pusi	5	2	7
4	FW	(Brazil)	21	Alex Souza	6	0	6
4	MF	(Azerbaijan)	77	Farid Nabiyev	6	0	6
6	FW	(Brazil)	7	Pachu	5	0	5
7	DF	(Panama)	5	Roderick Miller	4	0	4
8	FW	(Bulgaria)	79	Martin Petkov	3	0	3
9	DF	(Brazil)	6	Brunão	2	0	2
9	DF	(Togo)	15	Emmanuel Hackman	2	0	2
11	DF	(Azerbaijan)	4	Şehriyar Aliyev	1	0	1
11	DF	(Moldova)	25	Denis Marandici	1	0	1
11	DF	(Azerbaijan)	2	Sertan Taşqın	1	0	1
11	MF	(Azerbaijan)	10	Khayal Najafov	1	0	1
11	MF	(Spain)	23	Álex Serrano	1	0	1
11	DF	(Azerbaijan)	3	Tarlan Guliyev	0	1	1
				TOTALS	53	6	59

=== Clean sheets ===
Place	Position	Nation	Number	Name	Premier League	Azerbaijan Cup	Total
1	GK	(Azerbaijan)	13	Aydın Bayramov	9	0	9
2	GK	(Azerbaijan)	85	Kamal Bayramov	1	0	1
				TOTALS	10	0	10

=== Disciplinary record ===
Number	Nation	Position	Name	Premier League		Azerbaijan Cup		Total	
Number	Nation	Position	Name	Yellow card	Red card	Yellow card	Red card	Yellow card	Red card
2	(Azerbaijan)	MF	Ismayil Zulfugarli	1	0	0	0	1	0
3	(Azerbaijan)	DF	Tarlan Guliyev	1	0	1	0	2	0
4	(Azerbaijan)	DF	Şehriyar Aliyev	6	0	0	0	6	0
5	(Panama)	DF	Roderick Miller	7	1	1	0	8	1
6	(Brazil)	DF	Brunão	6	1	0	0	6	1
7	(Brazil)	FW	Pachu	4	0	0	0	4	0
8	(Azerbaijan)	MF	Farid Yusifli	2	0	0	0	2	0
9	(Albania)	FW	Belajdi Pusi	3	0	0	0	3	0
10	(Azerbaijan)	MF	Khayal Najafov	4	0	1	0	5	0
11	(Russia)	MF	Aykhan Guseynov	5	0	0	0	5	0
13	(Azerbaijan)	GK	Aydın Bayramov	4	0	0	0	4	0
14	(Azerbaijan)	DF	Slavik Alkhasov	3	0	0	0	3	0
15	(Togo)	DF	Emmanuel Hackman	3	0	0	0	3	0
18	(Azerbaijan)	MF	Budag Nasirov	1	0	1	0	2	0
23	(Spain)	MF	Álex Serrano	5	0	0	0	5	0
25	(Moldova)	DF	Denis Marandici	4	0	0	0	4	0
33	(Azerbaijan)	DF	Eltun Turabov	2	0	0	0	2	0
39	(Azerbaijan)	DF	Sadig Guliyev	1	0	0	0	1	0
77	(Azerbaijan)	MF	Farid Nabiyev	1	0	0	0	1	0
80	(Nigeria)	FW	Otto John	2	0	0	0	2	0
85	(Azerbaijan)	GK	Kamal Bayramov	1	0	0	0	1	0
88	(Azerbaijan)	DF	Faig Hajiyev	6	1	0	0	6	1
99	(Azerbaijan)	MF	Veysal Rzayev	6	0	0	0	6	0
Players who left Turan Tovuz during the season:
8	(Georgia (country))	MF	Piruz Marakvelidze	1	0	0	0	1	0
79	(Bulgaria)	FW	Martin Petkov	1	0	0	0	1	0
			TOTALS	80	3	4	0	84	3
