= 2017–18 KF Vllaznia Shkodër season =

Vllaznia Shkodër
2017–18 season
- Chairman: Voltana Ademi
- Manager: Ernest Gjoka
- Stadium: Loro Boriçi Stadium
- Kategoria Superiore: 9th
- Albanian Cup: 2nd Round
Home colours	Away colours

Vllaznia Shkodër participated in the Kategoria Superiore for the 2017–18 season. Due to finishing in 9th, they were relegation to the Kategoria e Parë for the following season.

== Current squad ==
As of 6 January 2018

Note: Flags indicate national team as defined under FIFA eligibility rules; some limited exceptions apply. Players may hold more than one non-FIFA nationality.

No.	Pos.	Nation	Player
31	GK	ALB	Alen Sherri
2	DF	ALB	Erdenis Gurishta
3	DF	ALB	Antonio Marku
5	DF	ALB	Denis Pjeshka
6	MF	ALB	Ardit Krymi
7	MF	ALB	Florind Bardulla
9	FW	GHA	Charles Atsina
11	FW	ALB	Eraldo Çinari
14	MF	ALB	Arsid Kruja

No.	Pos.	Nation	Player
17	FW	ALB	Gilman Lika (Captain)
18	MF	NGR	Nurudeen Orelesi
19	FW	ALB	Arlind Kalaja
20	MF	ALB	Erjon Vucaj
21	DF	ALB	Olsi Gocaj
22	FW	ALB	Andi Ribaj
1	GK	ALB	Erind Selimaj
40	MF	ALB	Alsid Tafili (Vice-captain)
88	FW	ALB	Fation Kiri

=== Reserve team ===
Note: Flags indicate national team as defined under FIFA eligibility rules; some limited exceptions apply. Players may hold more than one non-FIFA nationality.

No.	Pos.	Nation	Player
—	GK	ALB	Zamir Vjerdha
—	GK	ALB	Eldi Hasani
—	DF	ALB	Denis Balaj
—	DF	ALB	Khaled Hoxha
—	DF	ALB	Saimir Hyseni
—	DF	ALB	Enes Isufi
—	DF	ALB	Mario Kola
—	DF	ALB	Armenis Kukaj
—	DF	ALB	Paulo Markolaj
—	DF	ALB	Denis Miloti
—	DF	ALB	Izmir Pelinku
—	DF	ALB	Suad Prençi
—	DF	ALB	Samet Ruqi
—	MF	ALB	Suad Bega

No.	Pos.	Nation	Player
—	MF	ALB	Bekim Dema
—	MF	ALB	Ari Djepaxhia
—	MF	ALB	Ibrahim Hallunaj
—	MF	ALB	Soni Hoti
—	MF	ALB	Ambroz Kapaklija
—	MF	ALB	Gjorgj Kushi
—	MF	ALB	Sahmet Lushaj
—	MF	ALB	Admir Mehja
—	MF	ALB	Grisel Tula
—	FW	ALB	Arenc Dibra
—	FW	ALB	Bekim Erkoceviç
—	FW	ALB	Arsen Hajdari
—	FW	ALB	Arbjas Hasani

== Competitions ==
=== Kategoria Superiore ===
==== League table ====
Pos	Team	Pld	W	D	L	GF	GA	GD	Pts	Qualification or relegation
6	Flamurtari	36	11	13	12	37	37	0	46	
7	Kamza	36	12	10	14	37	41	−4	46	
8	Teuta	36	12	10	14	55	58	−3	46	
9	Vllaznia (R)	36	12	8	16	38	42	−4	44	Relegation to 2018–19 Kategoria e Parë
10	Lushnja (R)	36	2	5	29	29	86	−57	11	Relegation to 2018–19 Kategoria e Parë

Source: Albanian Football Association (in Albanian), Soccerway
Rules for classification: 1) Points; 2) Head-to-head points; 3) Head-to-head goal difference; 4) Head-to-head goals scored; 5) Goal difference; 6) Goals scored; 7) Draw.
(R) Relegated

==== Results summary ====
Overall								Home						Away					
Pld	W	D	L	GF	GA	GD	Pts	W	D	L	GF	GA	GD	W	D	L	GF	GA	GD
36	12	8	16	38	42	−4	44	9	3	6	24	18	+6	3	5	10	14	24	−10

Last updated: 23 May 2018.

==== Results by round ====
Round	1	2	3	4	5	6	7	8	9	10	11	12	13	14	15	16	17	18	19	20	21	22	23	24	25	26	27	28	29	30	31	32	33	34	35	36
Ground	A	H	A	A	H	A	H	A	H	H	A	H	H	A	H	A	H	A	A	H	A	A	H	A	H	A	H	H	A	H	H	A	H	A	H	A
Result	W	L	D	L	D	L	L	D	L	W	L	W	L	L	W	L	L	L	W	W	D	L	W	D	D	L	W	W	L	L	W	D	D	L	W	W
Position	2	6	5	7	7	8	8	8	9	8	8	8	8	9	9	9	9	9	8	8	8	8	8	8	8	8	8	8	9	9	8	9	9	9	9	9

Source: Soccerway
A = Away; H = Home; W = Win; D = Draw; L = Loss
