= Brunão =

Brunão may refer to:

- Brunão (footballer) (born 1997), Brazilian football centre-back
- Brunão (stadium), Brazilian football stadium in Santo André, São Paulo
