= Belajdi Pusi =

Albanian footballer

Personal information
- Date of birth: 23 January 1998 (age 28)
- Place of birth: Shkodër, Albania
- Height: 1.85 m (6 ft 1 in)
- Position: Forward

Team information
- Current team: Fakel Voronezh
- Number: 19

Youth career
- Vllaznia

Senior career*
Years	Team	Apps	(Gls)
2017–2020	Vllaznia	16	(1)
2017–2018	→ Vllaznia B	14	(4)
2020–2023	Skënderbeu	75	(11)
2023–2024	Turan Tovuz	49	(5)
2024–2025	Shamakhi	21	(5)
2025–	Fakel Voronezh	56	(17)
- * Club domestic league appearances and goals as of 21 November 2026

Belajdi Pusi (born 23 January 1998) is an Albanian football player who plays for Russian club Fakel Voronezh.

== Club career ==
He made his Albanian First Division debut for Vllaznia B on 4 November 2017 in a game against Besa Kavajë.

On 19 February 2025, Pusi signed with Russian Premier League club Fakel Voronezh. On July 20, he scored his first goal for Fakel against FC Spartak Kostroma.

== Career statistics ==
As of 21 November 2026

Club	Season	League			Cup		Total	
Club	Season	Division	Apps	Goals	Apps	Goals	Apps	Goals
Vllaznia B	2017–18	Kategoria e Parë	14	4	0	0	14	4
Vllaznia	2017–18	Kategoria Superiore	3	1	1	0	4	1
Vllaznia	2018–19	Kategoria e Parë	9	0	2	0	11	0
Vllaznia	2019–20	Kategoria Superiore	4	0	2	0	6	0
Vllaznia	Total		16	1	5	0	21	1
Skënderbeu	2019–20	Kategoria Superiore	8	1	2	0	10	1
Skënderbeu	2020–21	Kategoria Superiore	30	4	4	1	34	5
Skënderbeu	2021–22	Kategoria Superiore	26	2	6	1	32	3
Skënderbeu	2022–23	Kategoria e Parë	11	4	1	2	12	6
Skënderbeu	Total		75	11	13	4	88	15
Turan Tovuz	2022–23	Azerbaijan Premier League	18	0	2	0	20	0
Turan Tovuz	2023–24	Azerbaijan Premier League	31	5	2	2	33	7
Turan Tovuz	Total		49	5	4	2	53	7
Shamakhi	2024–25	Azerbaijan Premier League	21	5	1	0	22	5
Fakel Voronezh	2024–25	Russian Premier League	9	0	0	0	9	0
Fakel Voronezh	2025–26	Russian First League	34	16	0	0	34	16
Fakel Voronezh	2026–27	Russian Premier League	13	1	5	0	18	1
Fakel Voronezh	Total		56	17	5	0	61	17
Career total			231	43	28	6	259	49
