= Jearl Margaritha =

Dutch-Curaçaoan footballer (born 2000)

Personal information
- Full name: Jearl Erwin Margaritha
- Date of birth: 10 April 2000 (age 26)
- Place of birth: Groningen, Netherlands
- Height: 1.81 m (5 ft 11 in)
- Position: Forward

Team information
- Current team: Beveren
- Number: 17

Youth career
- 2011–2014: Groningen
- 2014–2015: GVAV Rapiditas
- 2015–2019: FC Emmen

Senior career*
Years	Team	Apps	(Gls)
2019–2020	VV Hoogeveen	13	(11)
2020–2021	Almere City	9	(1)
2021–2023	TOP Oss	63	(19)
2023–2024	Sabah	18	(0)
2024–2025	Phoenix Rising	20	(5)
2025–	Beveren	40	(9)

International career^{‡}
2023–	Curaçao	26	(5)
- * Club domestic league appearances and goals as of 24 October 2026 ‡ National team caps and goals as of 5 October 2026

Jearl Erwin Margaritha (born 10 April 2000) is a professional footballer who plays as a forward for Belgian Pro League club Beveren. Born in the Netherlands, he plays for the Curaçao national team.

== Club career ==
Evolved in youth academies of Groningen and FC Emmen, Margaritha joined Dutch fifth division side VV Hoogeveen ahead of the 2019–20 Hoofdklasse season. On 1 September 2019, he made his competitive debut for the club in a 3–0 loss to Alphense Boys. He scored his first goal two weeks later in a 5–4 loss against Quick '20.

On 9 January 2020, Hoogeveen announced the departure of Margaritha to Almere City. However, it took almost two months to finalize the deal as he didn't have a contract with Hoogeveen. On 6 September 2020, he scored his first professional goal in his team's 6–4 win against Excelsior.

On 4 August 2021, Margaritha joined Eerste Divisie club TOP Oss. On 29 June 2023, he signed for Azerbaijan Premier League club Sabah on a contract until June 2027.

Margaritha signed with Phoenix Rising FC of the USL Championship on 16 August 2024. On 4 August 2025, he signed a three-year deal with Belgian Challenger Pro League side Beveren.

== International career ==
Born in the Netherlands, Margaritha is eligible to play for Curaçao through his heritage. In November 2020, Curaçao national team head coach Guus Hiddink named Margaritha in 23-man squad for one week's training camp.

Margaritha made his debut for Curaçao on 7 September 2023 in a 1–0 defeat to Trinidad and Tobago. He scored his first four international goals for Curaçao on 15 November 2024 in a 5–0 win over Saint Martin. In June 2025, he was named in the squad for the 2025 CONCACAF Gold Cup.

In May 2026, Margaritha was named in Curaçao's squad for the 2026 FIFA World Cup, the country's first-ever appearance at the tournament.

== Career statistics ==
=== Club ===
As of match played 20 September 2026

Appearances and goals by club, season and competition
Club	Season	League			National cup		Continental		Other		Total	
Club	Season	Division	Apps	Goals	Apps	Goals	Apps	Goals	Apps	Goals	Apps	Goals
VV Hoogeveen	2019–20	Hoofdklasse	13	11	—		—		—		13	11
Almere City	2020–21	Eerste Divisie	9	1	0	0	—		—		9	1
TOP Oss	2021–22	Eerste Divisie	35	6	0	0	—		—		35	6
TOP Oss	2022–23	Eerste Divisie	28	12	0	0	—		—		28	12
TOP Oss	Total		63	18	0	0	—		—		63	18
Sabah	2023–24	Azerbaijan Premier League	18	0	2	1	3 (Note: Appearances in UEFA Conference League)	0	—		23	1
Phoenix Rising	2024	USL Championship	9	2	0	0	—		1 (Note: Appearances in 2024 USL Championship playoffs)	0	10	2
Phoenix Rising	2025	USL Championship	11	3	1	1	—		4 (Note: Appearances in USL Cup)	0	16	4
Phoenix Rising	Total		20	5	1	1	—		5	0	26	6
Beveren	2025–26	Challenger Pro League	32	7	1	0	—		—		33	7
Beveren	2026–27	Belgian Pro League	6	2	0	0	—		—		6	2
Beveren	Total		38	9	1	0	—		—		39	9
Career total			160	44	4	2	3	0	5	0	172	46

=== International ===
As of match played 4 October 2026

Appearances and goals by national team and year
National team	Year	Apps	Goals
Curaçao	2023	2	0
Curaçao	2024	8	4
Curaçao	2025	9	1
Curaçao	2026	7	0
Total		26	5

Scores and results list Curaçao's goal tally first, score column indicates score after each Margaritha goal.

List of international goals scored by Jearl Margaritha
No.	Date	Venue	Opponent	Score	Result	Competition
1	15 November 2024	Ergilio Hato Stadium, Willemstad, Curaçao	Saint Martin	1–0	5–0	2024–25 CONCACAF Nations League
2	15 November 2024	Ergilio Hato Stadium, Willemstad, Curaçao	Saint Martin	2–0	5–0	2024–25 CONCACAF Nations League
3	15 November 2024	Ergilio Hato Stadium, Willemstad, Curaçao	Saint Martin	3–0	5–0	2024–25 CONCACAF Nations League
4	15 November 2024	Ergilio Hato Stadium, Willemstad, Curaçao	Saint Martin	5–0	5–0	2024–25 CONCACAF Nations League
5	10 June 2025	Trinidad Stadium, Oranjestad, Aruba	Haiti	3–1	5–1	2026 FIFA World Cup qualification

== Honours ==
Beveren

- Challenger Pro League: 2025–26
