= Gjorgj Kushi =

Albanian professional footballer (born 1998)

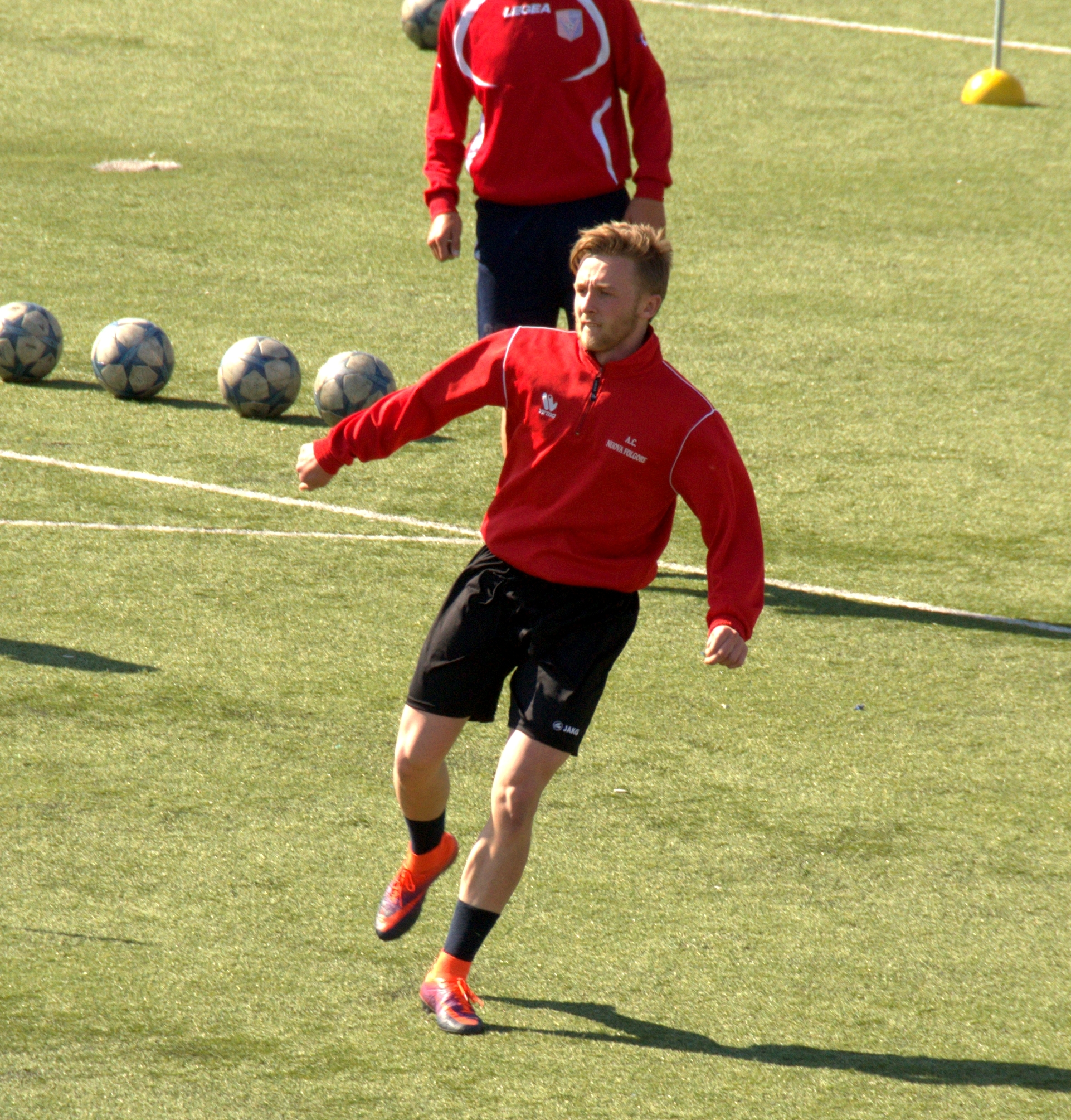
Gjorgj Kushi

Gjorgj Kushi (born 29 October 1998) is an Albanian professional footballer who plays for Albanian club FK Vllaznia. He plays mainly as a central midfielder but can also play as an attacking and defensive midfielder (playmaker). He was always admired as a talent because of his ability to find his teammates with impossible passes to create goalscoring opportunities and perceptiveness as a creator.

He started playing football when he was 6 with an amateur club in his home town where he impressed with his talent. At the age of 14 he joined the academy system of FK Vllaznia. He continued his development at U-15 where he scored 28 goals, U-17 he scored 10 goals. He was selected at the trials of the Albanian U-17 squad. At U-19 (half season) he scored only 1 goal due to immigration reasons. At the age of 17 he moved to London, England. In March, 2016 he attended the Under-18 Development Squad trials for Barnet FC where he was immediately offered a non-professional contract to join the Barnet Football Club's Academy where he played for U-18 Development Squad of Barnet FC academy until December where he returned to his home town. In January, 2017 he returned to FK Vllaznia.
