= Paulo Markolaj =

Albanian footballer

Personal information
- Full name: Paulo Markolaj
- Date of birth: 31 October 1993 (age 33)
- Place of birth: Bushat, Shkodër County, Albania
- Position: Attacking midfielder

Youth career
- Vllaznia

Senior career*
Years	Team	Apps	(Gls)
2011–2018	Vllaznia	15	(3)
2014	→ Ada (loan)	12	(3)
2015-2016	→ Ada (loan)	11	(1)
2018	Veleçiku	3	(0)
- * Club domestic league appearances and goals

Paulo Markolaj (born 31 October 1993 in Bushat, Shkodër County) is an Albanian football player.
