= Madi Queta =

Bissau-Guinean footballer

Personal information
- Date of birth: 21 October 1998 (age 28)
- Place of birth: Bissau, Guinea-Bissau
- Height: 1.80 m (5 ft 11 in)
- Position: Winger

Youth career
- 2011–2017: Porto
- 2013–2014: → Padroense (loan)

Senior career*
Years	Team	Apps	(Gls)
2017–2020	Porto B	76	(8)
2020–2022	Farense	40	(2)
2022–2023	Cherno More	17	(1)
2023	Vilafranquense	10	(0)
2023–2024	Mafra	4	(0)
2024–2025	Sabail	50	(3)
2025–2026	Penafiel	3	(0)

International career^{‡}
2013	Portugal U15	2	(1)
2013–2014	Portugal U16	9	(2)
2015	Portugal U17	3	(0)
2015	Portugal U18	2	(0)
2016–2017	Portugal U19	8	(0)
2017	Portugal U20	2	(0)
2022–	Guinea-Bissau	4	(0)
Medal record
Men's football
Representing Portugal
UEFA European Under-19 Championship
Runner-up	2017 Georgia
- * Club domestic league appearances and goals as of 30 August 2026 ‡ National team caps and goals as of 17:12, 19 January 2024 (UTC)

Madi Queta (born 21 October 1998) is a Bissau-Guinean professional footballer who plays as a winger for the Guinea-Bissau national team.

== Club career ==
On 19 August 2017, Queta made his professional debut with FC Porto B in a 2017–18 LigaPro match against Penafiel. In June 2022 he joined Bulgarian First League club Cherno More Varna. In January 2023, Queta returned to Portugal, signing a contract with second tier team Vilafranquense.

On 3 July 2023, Queta signed a one-year contract with Liga Portugal 2 club Mafra.

On 19 January 2024, after having scored one goal in seven appearances for Mafra, Queta terminated his contract with the club by mutual agreement and signed a one-and-a-half-year deal with Azerbaijan Premier League side Sabail.

== International career ==
Born in Guinea-Bissau, and raised in Portugal, Queta is a former youth international for Portugal. He debuted with the Guinea-Bissau national team in a friendly 3–0 win over Equatorial Guinea on 23 March 2022.
