= Charles Atsina =

Ghanaian-Italian footballer

Personal information
- Full name: Charles Buaku Atsina Junior
- Date of birth: 24 March 1989 (age 37)
- Place of birth: Takoradi, Ghana
- Height: 1.83 m (6 ft 0 in)
- Position: Forward

Team information
- Current team: Pistoiese

Senior career*
Years	Team	Apps	(Gls)
2009–2011	Virtus Vecomp Verona		
2011–2012	Alcorcón	5	
2013–2014	VfL Bochum II		
2014–2015	TuS Ennepetal	22	(5)
2015–2016	KäPa	12	(4)
2017	Panevėžys	20	(7)
2017–2018	Vllanzia	15	(5)
2018	Kastrioti	9	(1)
2019–2020	Hibernians	9	(0)
2021–2023	Uerdingen 05	27+	(8+)
2024–	Pistoiese	1	(0)
- * Club domestic league appearances and goals as of 18 January 2024

Charles Buaku Atsina Junior is a Ghana-born Italian professional footballer who plays as a forward for Serie D club Pistoiese.

== Career ==
Born on 24 March 1989, he grew up in Italy where he started his football academy in Verona. In 2012, he joined Spanish side Alcorcón.

In 2013, he moved to VfL Bochum II.

In 2015, he joined Tus Ennepetal and became the only player to score five goals in a game during the first round of the German Kreispokal. On 28 July 2013, he became the first Ghanaian and Italian footballer to score eight goals in 60 minutes during a tournament of Rodemann cup in Bochum, Germany. His team beat DJK Adler Dahlhausen 1923 e.V. 13–1 in the Rodemann Cup.

On 14 October 2017, he signed a contract with Albanian club Vllanzia brought in by manager Armando Cungu.

In August 2019, he signed a contract with Maltese Premier League club Hibernians F.C.

In August 2021, he returned to Germany to play for Uerdingen 05.

Following a successful deal with the Serie D historical club Pistoiese, Atsina officially signed a six-month contract with the club on 18 January 2024. He is currently serving as an Assistant Coach with the FC Barcelona Academy in Germany and Netherlands contributing to the club's European training camps. In this role, he supports the technical staff in player development, training implementation, and talent identification, working in alignment with FC Barcelona's football philosophy and methodology.
