= Paná (footballer) =

Angolan footballer (born 1992)

Personal information
- Full name: Valdemar António Almeida
- Date of birth: 9 March 1992 (age 34)
- Place of birth: Luanda, Angola
- Height: 1.82 m (6 ft 0 in)
- Position: Midfielder

Senior career*
Years	Team	Apps	(Gls)
2012–2013	Tourizense	17	(1)
2013–2016	Marítimo B	78	(1)
2016	Chaves	0	(0)
2016–2019	Académico Viseu	86	(7)
2019–2020	Leixões	9	(0)
2020–2023	Académico Viseu	85	(4)
2023–2024	Sabail	36	(1)
2024–2025	Kapaz	29	(1)

International career^{‡}
2016–	Angola	3	(0)
- * Club domestic league appearances and goals as of 27 June 2025 ‡ National team caps and goals as of 5 June 2016

Valdemar António Almeida (born 9 March 1992), known as Paná, is an Angolan professional footballer who plays as a midfielder.

== Career ==
On 11 August 2013, Pana made his professional debut with Marítimo B in a 2013–14 Segunda Liga match against Sporting Covilhã.

On 10 September 2024, a one-season contract was signed between Almeida and the Kapaz, which competes in the Azerbaijan Premier League.

== Career statistics ==
Scores and results list Angola's goal tally first.

Goal	Date	Venue	Opponent	Score	Result	Competition
1.	5 June 2016	Barthélemy Boganda Stadium, Bangui, Central African Republic	Central African Republic	1–3	1–3	2017 Africa Cup of Nations qualification
