= Ayaz Guliyev =

Russian footballer

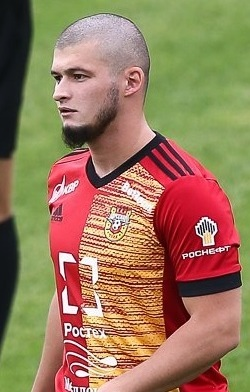
- Guliyev with Arsenal Tula in 2021

Personal information
- Full name: Ayaz Bakhtiyarovich Guliyev
- Date of birth: 27 November 1996 (age 29)
- Place of birth: Moscow, Russia
- Height: 1.72 m (5 ft 8 in)
- Position: Midfielder

Youth career
- –2015: Spartak Moscow

Senior career*
Years	Team	Apps	(Gls)
2014–2018	Spartak-2 Moscow	49	(1)
2017	→ Anzhi Makhachkala (loan)	22	(1)
2018	→ Rostov (loan)	6	(0)
2018	Rostov	14	(1)
2019–2021	Spartak Moscow	21	(1)
2021–2022	Arsenal Tula	24	(0)
2022–2023	Khimki	19	(0)
2023–2026	Sabah	45	(1)
2026	Arsenal Tula	11	(0)

International career
2011–2012	Russia U16	8	(1)
2012–2013	Russia U17	19	(4)
2014	Russia U18	4	(3)
2014–2015	Russia U19	8	(2)
2015–2018	Russia U21	22	(3)
- * Club domestic league appearances and goals as of 16 May 2026

Ayaz Bakhtiyarovich Guliyev (Russian: Аяз Бахтиярович Гулиев; Azerbaijani: Ayaz Bəxtiyar oğlu Quliyev; born 27 November 1996) is a Russian professional footballer who plays as defensive midfielder or central midfielder.

== Club career ==
=== Spartak Moscow ===
He made his professional debut in the Russian Professional Football League for FC Spartak-2 Moscow on 9 April 2014 in a game against FC Tambov.

=== Anzhi Makhachkala ===
On 20 February 2017, it was announced that Guliyev had joined Russian Premier League club Anzhi Makhachkala on loan. He made his Russian Premier League debut for Anzhi against Spartak Moscow in Otkrytiye Arena on 12 March 2017. Guliyev scored his first goal for Anzhi in the Russian Premier League match against Arsenal Tula in a 3–2 home victory on 22 October 2017. His Anzhi loan was terminated on 7 January 2018.

=== Rostov ===
On 10 January 2018, he joined FC Rostov on loan until 31 May 2018. On 6 June 2018, he moved to Rostov on a permanent basis, signing a 4-year contract. Guliyev scored his first goal for Rostov in the Russian Premier League match against Yenisey in a 4–0 home victory on 19 August 2018.

=== Return to Spartak ===
On 9 January 2019, Spartak Moscow announced that they bought Guliyev back from Rostov and signed a long-term contract with him. On 11 May 2021, his contract was terminated by mutual consent.

=== Arsenal Tula ===
On 21 June 2021, he signed a two-year contract with Arsenal Tula.

=== Khimki ===
On 8 July 2022, Guliyev joined Khimki on a two-season deal.

=== Sabah ===
On 28 August 2023, Azerbaijan Premier League club Sabah announced the signing of Guliyev from Khimki on a three-year contract.

=== Return to Arsenal Tula ===
On 26 January 2026, Guliyev returned to Arsenal Tula in the Russian First League.

== International career ==
Guliyev was born in Russia to an Azerbaijani father and Russian mother, and holds dual-citizenship. He participated in the 2013 FIFA U-17 World Cup with Russia national under-17 football team.

Later Guliyev represented Russia national under-19 football team at the 2015 UEFA European Under-19 Championship, where Russia came in second place.

In an interview with Baku.ws in 2022, Guliyev described Azerbaijan as his "homeland" and said it would be an "honour" to represent the Azerbaijan national team. On 24 February 2025, his request to switch international allegiance to Azerbaijan was approved by FIFA. However, he was never capped for Azerbaijan.

On 5 March 2026, Guliyev's request to switch international allegiance back to Russia was approved by FIFA.

== Personal life ==
Guliyev was born in Moscow, Russia, to a father from Azerbaijan, Bakhtiyar Guliyev, and a Russian mother.

== Career statistics ==
As of 16 May 2026

Club	Season	League			Cup		Continental		Other		Total	
Club	Season	Division	Apps	Goals	Apps	Goals	Apps	Goals	Apps	Goals	Apps	Goals
Spartak-2 Moscow	2013–14	Russian Second League	2	0	—		—		—		2	0
Spartak-2 Moscow	2014–15	Russian Second League	7	0	—		—		—		7	0
Spartak-2 Moscow	2015–16	Russian First League	23	1	—		—		3 (Note: Appearances in the FNL Cup)	1	26	2
Spartak-2 Moscow	2016–17	Russian First League	17	0	—		—		1	0	18	0
Spartak-2 Moscow	Total		49	1	0	0	0	0	4	1	53	2
Anzhi Makhachkala (loan)	2016–17	Russian Premier League	11	0	1	0	—		—		12	0
Anzhi Makhachkala (loan)	2017–18	Russian Premier League	11	1	0	0	—		—		11	1
Anzhi Makhachkala (loan)	Total		22	1	1	0	0	0	0	0	23	1
Rostov (loan)	2017–18	Russian Premier League	6	0	—		—		—		6	0
Rostov	2018–19	Russian Premier League	14	1	1	0	—		—		15	1
Spartak Moscow	2018–19	Russian Premier League	10	1	1	0	—		—		11	1
Spartak Moscow	2019–20	Russian Premier League	11	0	0	0	4 (Note: Appearances in the UEFA Europa League)	0	—		15	0
Spartak Moscow	2020–21	Russian Premier League	0	0	0	0	—		—		0	0
Spartak Moscow	Total		21	1	1	0	4	0	0	0	26	1
Arsenal Tula	2021–22	Russian Premier League	24	0	2	0	—		—		26	0
Khimki	2022–23	Russian Premier League	19	0	2	0	—		—		21	0
Sabah	2023–24	Azerbaijan Premier League	24	1	1	0	—		—		25	1
Sabah	2024–25	Azerbaijan Premier League	12	0	3	0	2 (Note: Appearances in the UEFA Conference League)	0	—		17	0
Sabah	2025–26	Azerbaijan Premier League	9	0	1	0	2	0	—		12	0
Sabah	Total		45	1	5	0	4	0	0	0	54	1
Arsenal Tula	2025–26	Russian First League	11	0	1	0	—		—		12	0
Career total			211	5	13	0	8	0	4	1	236	6

== Honours ==
Sabah

- Azerbaijan Cup: 2024–25
