= Alexandre Ramalingom =

French-born Malagasy footballer (born 1993)

Personal information
- Full name: Alexandre Ramalingom
- Date of birth: 17 March 1993 (age 33)
- Place of birth: Pontoise, France
- Height: 1.77 m (5 ft 10 in)
- Position: Forward

Team information
- Current team: Persita Tangerang
- Number: 90

Senior career*
Years	Team	Apps	(Gls)
2012–2014	Marignane	19	(1)
2014–2015	Île-Rousse	23	(12)
2015–2017	Ajaccio II	42	(14)
2015–2017	Ajaccio	4	(0)
2017–2018	Marignane	30	(20)
2018–2019	Béziers	23	(4)
2019–2020	Virton	10	(0)
2020–2023	Sedan	69	(30)
2023–2024	Sabail	35	(15)
2024–2025	Bnei Sakhnin	26	(7)
2025–2026	Sumgayit	30	(10)
2026–	Persita Tangerang	7	(4)

International career
2020–2022	Madagascar	8	(0)
- * Club domestic league appearances and goals as of 31 October 2026

Alexandre Ramalingom (born 17 March 1993) is a professional footballer who plays as a forward for Super League club Persita Tangerang. Born in France, he plays for the Madagascar national team.

== Club career ==
Ramalingom started his career in the amateur divisions of France with Marignane and Île-Rousse. He moved to AC Ajaccio in 2015, and made his senior debut with them in a 3–0 Ligue 2 loss to Stade de Reims on 20 March 2017.

On 23 June 2018, Ramalingom signed with Béziers. He debuted for Béziers on 27 July 2016 in a 2–0 Ligue 2 win over AS Nancy, where he also scored his debut goal for the team.

Ramalingom joined R.E. Virton on 31 August 2019. Two months later, he was relegated to the club's B-team. He became a part of the first team again from the beginning of 2020. In September 2020 he returned to France with Sedan.

On 17 July 2025, he signed a 1+1 year contract with Azerbaijani Premier League side Sumgayit.

On 9 July 2026, Ramalingom officially completed a transfer to Indonesian Super League club Persita Tangerang, marking his first venture into Asian football.

== International career ==
Ramalingom was born in France and is of Réunionnais and Malagasy descent. He was called up to represent the Madagascar national team for Africa Cup of Nations qualifiers in March 2020. He debuted in a 4–1 friendly win to FC Swift Hesperange on 7 October 2020.
