= Pachu (footballer, born 1996) =

Brazilian footballer

Personal information
- Full name: Luiz Henrique Pachu Lira
- Date of birth: 26 February 1996 (age 30)
- Place of birth: Rio de Janeiro, Brazil
- Height: 1.85 m (6 ft 1 in)
- Position: Forward

Team information
- Current team: The Strongest

Youth career
- Botafogo

Senior career*
Years	Team	Apps	(Gls)
2016–2019	Botafogo	10	(0)
2016	→ Gonçalense (loan)	4	(0)
2017	→ Santa Cruz (loan)	0	(0)
2019	→ Boavista (loan)	1	(0)
2020	Atibaia	6	(0)
2020	Atlético-PB	12	(5)
2021	Cianorte	3	(1)
2021–2023	Trofense	41	(7)
2023–2024	Turan Tovuz	23	(5)
2024–2026	Kapaz	54	(9)
- * Club domestic league appearances and goals as of 22 June 2026

Luiz Henrique Pachu Lira (born 26 February 1996), commonly known as Pachu, is a Brazilian footballer who plays as a forward, most recently for Kapaz in the Azerbaijan Premier League.

== Career ==
=== Club ===
On 24 September 2024, the Azerbaijani Premier League club Kapaz announced that they have signed a contract with Pachu until the end of the season. On 7 July 2026, Kapaz announced that Pachu had left the club after his contract was terminated by mutual agreement.

== Career statistics ==
=== Club ===
As of 25 September 2024.

Club	Season	League			State League		Cup		Continental		Other		Total	
Club	Season	Division	Apps	Goals	Apps	Goals	Apps	Goals	Apps	Goals	Apps	Goals	Apps	Goals
Botafogo	2016	Série A	1	0	0	0	0	0	—		—		1	0
Botafogo	2017	Série A	2	0	4	0	0	0	—		—		6	0
Botafogo	2018	Série A	1	0	2	0	0	0	—		—		3	0
Botafogo	2019	Série A	0	0	—		—		—		—		0	0
Botafogo	Total		4	0	6	0	0	0	—		—		10	0
Gonçalense (loan)	2016	Carioca Série B	—		4	0	—		—		—		4	0
Santa Cruz (loan)	2017	Série B	0	0	—		—		—		—		0	0
Boavista (loan)	2019	Série D	0	0	1	0	0	0	—		—		1	0
Atibaia	2020	Paulista A2	6	0	—		—		—		—		6	0
Atlético-PB	2020	Série D	10	5	—		—		—		—		10	5
Cianorte	2021	Série D	3	1	13	6	4	0	—		—		20	7
Trofense	2021–2022	Segunda Liga	11	1	—		2	1	—		—		13	2
Trofense	2022–2023	Segunda Liga	30	6	—		1	0	—		—		31	6
Turan Tovuz	2023–2024	Azerbaijan Premier League	23	5	—		1	0	—		—		24	5
Kapaz	2024–2025	Azerbaijan Premier League	0	0	—		0	0	—		—		0	0
Career total			97	18	24	0	8	0	0	0	0	0	119	0
