= Brunão (footballer) =

Brazilian footballer (born 1997)

Personal information
- Full name: Bruno Gonçalves do Prado
- Date of birth: 24 February 1997 (age 29)
- Place of birth: Poconé, Brazil
- Height: 1.88 m (6 ft 2 in)
- Position: Centre-back

Team information
- Current team: Azuriz

Senior career*
Years	Team	Apps	(Gls)
2015–2019	Vila Nova	51	(1)
2019–2022	Arouca	29	(1)
2019	→ Vila Nova (loan)	8	(1)
2022–2023	Leixões	27	(4)
2023–2024	Turan Tovuz	33	(2)
2024–2025	Guarani	0	(0)
2025–	Azuriz	20	(9)
- * Club domestic league appearances and goals as of 16:49, 26 December 2025 (UTC)

Bruno Gonçalves do Prado (born 24 February 1997), commonly known as Brunão, is a Brazilian professional footballer who plays as a centre-back for Campeonato Brasileiro Série D club Azuriz.

== Club career ==
Brunão began his career with Vila Nova in Brazil. He made his professional debut with Vila Nova in a 1–0 Campeonato Brasileiro Série C win over Boa on 13 May 2017. He transferred to the Portuguese club Arouca in 2019, and promptly returned to Vila Nova on loan for the remainder of the season.
