= 2025–26 Turan Tovuz season =

Turan Tovuz
2025–26 season
- Manager: Kurban Berdyev
- Stadium: City Stadium
- Premier League: 3rd
- Azerbaijan Cup: Semi-finals vs Zira
- Top goalscorer: League: Jô (10); All: Jô (10)
- Highest home attendance: 5,800 (vs Şamaxı, 2 November 2025, Premier League)
- Lowest home attendance: 200 (vs İmişli, 1 March 2026, Premier League)
- Average home league attendance: 2,159

The 2025–26 season was Turan Tovuz's 34th year since its founding and its fourth consecutive season in Azerbaijan's premier league.

== Season events ==
On 23 June, Turan Tovuz announced the signing of David Tavares from Gloria Buzău, to a three-year contract.

On 10 July, Turan Tovuz announced the season-long loan signing of Abdulla Rzayev from Sabah.

On 11 July, Turan Tovuz announced the signing of Roberto Olabe from Ibiza, to a two-year contract.

On 26 July, Turan Tovuz announced the signing of Oleg Baklov from Ufa, to a two-year contract, and the signing of Filip Ozobić who'd last played for Neftçi to a one-year contract with the option of an additional season.

On 18 August, Turan Tovuz announced the signing of Henrique from Real Valladolid, to a two-year contract.

On 31 July, Turan Tovuz announced the signing of Ibrahima Wadji from Saint-Étienne, to a one-year contract with the option of an additional year.

On 6 January, Turan Tovuz announced that they had agreed a deal with Kyoto Sanga for the transfer of Alex Souza to the J1 League club.

On 24 January, Turan Tovuz announced the signing of free-agent Josh Ginnelly to an 18-month contract.

On 11 February, Turan Tovuz announced the loan signing of Mark Mampassi from Lokomotiv Moscow, until the end of the season.

== Squad ==
As of match played 22 May 2026

No.	Name	Nationality	Position	Date of birth (age)	Signed from	Signed in	Contract ends	Apps.	Goals
Goalkeepers
1	Oleg Baklov	(Tajikistan)	GK	20 October 1994 (age 31)	Ufa	2025	2027	23	0
41	Sergei Samok	(Russia)	GK	15 February 2001 (age 25)	KAMAZ	2024		32	0
71	Mehman Haciyev	(Azerbaijan)	GK	28 January 1995 (age 31)	Sumgayit	2016			
Defenders
2	Mark Mampassi	(Russia)	DF	12 March 2003 (age 23)	on loan from Lokomotiv Moscow	2026	2026	14	0
3	Henrique	(Brazil)	DF	25 April 1994 (age 32)	Real Valladolid	2025	2027	26	0
4	Şehriyar Aliyev	(Azerbaijan)	DF	25 December 1992 (age 33)	Shamakhi	2022		86	6
5	Roderick Miller	(Panama)	DF	3 April 1992 (age 34)	Al-Minaa	2023		80	10
7	Jorge Silva	(Portugal)	DF	22 March 1996 (age 30)	Olimpija Ljubljana	2025		31	2
15	Emmanuel Hackman	(Togo)	DF	14 May 1995 (age 31)	Mladost Novi Sad	2023		98	4
20	Ibrahim Ramazanov	(Azerbaijan)	DF	10 October 2004 (age 21)	Gabala	2024	2026	0	0
25	Denis Marandici	(Moldova)	DF	18 September 1996 (age 30)	Zrinjski Mostar	2023		65	2
32	Haiderson Hurtado	(Colombia)	DF	25 November 1995 (age 30)	Jablonec	2025	2027	51	7
73	Ulvu Madatov	(Azerbaijan)	DF	6 January 2003 (age 23)	Sabail	2024		1	0
88	Faig Hajiyev	(Azerbaijan)	DF	22 May 1999 (age 27)	Gabala	2021			
Midfielders
6	Farid Yusifli	(Azerbaijan)	MF	20 February 2002 (age 24)	Neftçi	2024		46	0
8	David Tavares	(Cape Verde)	MF	18 March 1999 (age 27)	Gloria Buzău	2025	2028	6	0
10	Khayal Najafov	(Azerbaijan)	MF	19 December 1997 (age 28)	Neftçi	2024		116	5
11	Aykhan Guseynov	(Russia)	MF	3 September 1999 (age 27)	Khimki	2022		142	22
14	Murad Dadaşev	(Azerbaijan)	MF	9 May 2004 (age 22)	Unattached	2024		2	0
17	Ragim Sadykhov	(Azerbaijan)	MF	18 July 1996 (age 30)	Sumgayit	2025	2027	56	4
19	Roberto Olabe	(Spain)	MF	5 May 1996 (age 30)	Ibiza	2025	2027	36	3
23	Álex Serrano	(Spain)	MF	6 February 1995 (age 31)	Hebar Pazardzhik	2023		107	12
29	Filip Ozobić	(Azerbaijan)	MF	8 April 1991 (age 35)	Unattached	2025	2026 (+1)	31	6
30	Mircamal Alizada	(Azerbaijan)	MF	13 December 2004 (age 21)	Araz-Naxçıvan	2025		2	0
39	Tural Bayramli	(Azerbaijan)	MF	7 January 1998 (age 28)	Araz-Naxçıvan	2024	2026	10	0
42	Ismayil Ismayilov	(Azerbaijan)	MF	12 September 2005 (age 21)	Academy	2025		2	0
60	Vüqar Bagyrov	(Azerbaijan)	MF	12 October 2006 (age 19)	Academy	2025		2	0
97	Elchin Qasymov	(Azerbaijan)	MF	4 September 2002 (age 24)	Academy	2025		1	0
Forwards
9	Josh Ginnelly	(England)	FW	24 March 1997 (age 29)	Unattached	2026	2027	10	0
90	Jô	(Brazil)	FW	1 May 1995 (age 31)	Chaves	2025	2027	42	11
99	Ibrahima Wadji	(Senegal)	FW	5 May 1997 (age 29)	Saint-Étienne	2025	2026 (+1)	30	4
Out on loan
Out on loan
44	Rufat Ahmadov	(Azerbaijan)	DF	22 September 2002 (age 24)	Gabala	2024	2026 (+1)	15	0
99	Sadiq Shafiyev	(Azerbaijan)	MF	13 October 2005 (age 20)	Academy	2023		12	1
Left during the season
2	Abdulla Rzayev	(Azerbaijan)	DF	12 March 2002 (age 24)	on loan from Sabah	2025	2026	4	0
21	Alex Souza	(Brazil)	FW	24 March 2001 (age 25)	Hegelmann	2024	2026	68	20
34	Huseyn Huseynov	(Azerbaijan)	DF	25 July 2006 (age 20)	Academy	2024		1	2
77	Veysal Rzayev	(Azerbaijan)	MF	24 October 2002 (age 23)	Sabah	2024		86	2

== Transfers ==
=== In ===
Date	Position	Nationality	Name	From	Fee	Ref.
23 June 2025	MF	(Cape Verde)	David Tavares	Gloria Buzău	Undisclosed	
11 July 2025	MF	(Spain)	Roberto Olabe	Ibiza	Undisclosed	
26 July 2025	GK	(Tajikistan)	Oleg Baklov	Ufa	Undisclosed	
26 July 2025	FW	(Azerbaijan)	Filip Ozobić	Unattached	Free	
31 July 2025	FW	(Senegal)	Ibrahima Wadji	Saint-Étienne	Undisclosed	
18 August 2025	DF	(Brazil)	Henrique	Real Valladolid	Undisclosed	
24 January 2026	FW	(England)	Josh Ginnelly	Unattached	Free	

=== Loans in ===
Date from	Position	Nationality	Name	From	Date to	Ref.
10 July 2025	MF	(Azerbaijan)	Abdulla Rzayev	Sabah	27 January 2026	
11 February 2026	DF	(Russia)	Mark Mampassi	Lokomotiv Moscow	30 June 2026	

=== Out ===
Date	Position	Nationality	Name	To	Fee	Ref.
6 January 2026	FW	(Brazil)	Alex Souza	Kyoto Sanga	Undisclosed	

=== Released ===
Date	Position	Nationality	Name	Joined	Date	Ref
29 December 2025	MF	(Azerbaijan)	Veysal Rzayev	Kapaz	7 January 2026	

== Competitions ==
=== Overall record ===
Competition	First match	Last match	Starting round	Final position	Record							
Competition	First match	Last match	Starting round	Final position	Pld	W	D	L	GF	GA	GD	Win %
Premier League	16 August 2025	22 May 2026	Matchday 1	3rd	33	17	8	8	44	27	+17	51.52
Azerbaijan Cup	28 October 2025	21 April 2026	Second round	Semi-finals	6	4	1	1	10	3	+7	66.67
Total					39	21	9	9	54	30	+24	53.85

Last updated: 22 May 2026
Source: Competitions

=== Premier League ===
==== League table ====
Pos	Team	Pld	W	D	L	GF	GA	GD	Pts	Qualification or relegation
1	Sabah (C)	33	24	6	3	75	25	+50	78	Qualification for the Champions League first qualifying round
2	Qarabağ	33	21	6	6	71	27	+44	69	Qualification for the Europa League first qualifying round (Note: The 2025–26 Azerbaijan Cup winner (Sabah) qualified for the Europa League first qualifying round. Since Sabah also won the league, the berth was passed to the second place team and the Conference League berths go to the third and fourth placed teams.)
3	Turan Tovuz (Note: UEFA removed Turan Tovuz for a past match-fixing case.)	33	17	8	8	44	27	+17	59 (Note: Matches won: Turan-Tovuz 17, Neftçi 16.)	
4	Neftçi	33	16	11	6	57	32	+25	59	Qualification for the Conference League second qualifying round
5	Zira	33	13	14	6	43	36	+7	53	Qualification for the Conference League first qualifying round

Source: Soccerway
Rules for classification: 1) Points; 2) Matches won; 3) Goal difference; 4) Goals scored; 5) Head-to-head points; 6) Head-to-head goal difference; 7) Lower number of points based on yellow and red cards; 8) Draw.
(C) Champions

==== Results summary ====
Overall								Home						Away					
Pld	W	D	L	GF	GA	GD	Pts	W	D	L	GF	GA	GD	W	D	L	GF	GA	GD
33	17	8	8	44	27	+17	59	9	3	4	22	15	+7	8	5	4	22	12	+10

Last updated: 22 May 2026.

==== Results by round ====
Round	1	2	3	4	5	6	7	8	9	10	11	12	13	15	16	17	18	19	20	21	14	22	23	24	25	26	27	28	29	30	31	32	33
Ground	A	H	A	H	A	H	A	H	A	H	A	A	H	H	A	H	A	H	A	H	A	H	A	A	H	A	H	A	H	A	H	A	H
Result	W	L	W	W	L	W	W	L	W	W	D	D	D	L	W	W	L	W	D	W	W	D	W	D	W	D	W	W	D	L	W	L	L
Position	3	3	6	5	3	5	2	1	3	2	2	3	4	4	3	4	3	3	3	3	3	3	3	3	3	3	3	3	3	3	3	3	3

Updated to match(es) played on 22 May 2026. Source:
A = Away; H = Home; W = Win; D = Draw; L = Loss

==== Matches ====
16 August 2025 1	İmişli	0–1	Turan Tovuz	Shamakhi
17:00 (UTC+4)	Rollo (yellow card) 12'; Moses (yellow card) 38'	Report	Guseynov (yellow card) 37'; Rzayev (yellow card) 44'; Olabe (yellow card) 67' (goal) 90+9'	Stadium: City Stadium; Attendance: 1,900; Referee: Kamal Umudlu

24 August 2025 2	Turan Tovuz	1–2	Araz-Naxçıvan	Baku
19:30 AZT (UTC+4)	Serrano 77' (pen.)	Report	Rodrigues (yellow card) 24'; Boli 38'; Simakala 52'; Mammadov (yellow card) 74'; Santos (yellow card) 79'; Keyta (yellow card) 87'	Stadium: Azersun Arena; Attendance: 900; Referee: Tural Qurbanov

29 August 2025 3	Neftçi	0–1	Turan Tovuz	Baku
20:30 AZT (UTC+4)	Ribeiro (red card) 55'; Seck (yellow card) 60'	Report	Olabe 6'; Miller (yellow card) 58'; Baklov (yellow card) 90+4'	Stadium: Neftçi Arena; Attendance: 2,084; Referee: Aliyar Aghayev

13 September 2025 4	Turan Tovuz	1–0	Gabala	Baku
19:00 AZT (UTC+4)	Souza 54'	Report	Kunde (yellow card) 64'	Stadium: Azersun Arena; Attendance: 1,200; Referee: Cavid Cəlilov

20 September 2025 5	Sabah	2–0	Turan Tovuz	Masazir
19:30 AZT (UTC+4)	Zedadka (yellow card) 9'; Simić 56'; Mickels (yellow card) 90+1'; Šafranko 90+6' (pen.)	Report	Ozobić (yellow card) 61'	Stadium: Bank Respublika Arena; Attendance: 820; Referee: Rəvan Həmzəzadə

28 September 2025 6	Turan Tovuz	3–0	Kapaz	Baku
16:30 (UTC+4)	Jô (yellow card) 25' (goal) 35'; Souza 33'; Ozobić 46'; Silva (yellow card) 52'	Report	Aptsiauri (yellow card) 45'	Stadium: Azersun Arena; Attendance: 700; Referee: İnqilab Məmmədov

4 October 2025 7	Sumgayit	0–3	Turan Tovuz	Sumgait
19:30 (UTC+4)	Murata (yellow card) 37'; Abdullazade (yellow card) 43'; Ramalingom (penalty missed) 72'; Senhadji (yellow card) 76'; Janković (yellow card) 81'	Report	Jô 35'; Souza (yellow card) 49' (goal) 59'; Guseynov 90+3'	Stadium: City Stadium; Attendance: 1,400; Referee: Fərid Hacıyev

17 October 2025 8	Turan Tovuz	1–2	Qarabağ	Tovuz
19:00 (UTC+4)	Serrano (yellow card) 20' (goal) 40' (pen.); Ozobić (yellow card) 24'; Miller (yellow card) 33'	Report	Mmaee (yellow card) 24'; Akhundzade 55'; Zoubir 63'; Magomedaliyev (yellow card) 81'	Stadium: City Stadium; Attendance: 1,000; Referee: Elçin Məsiyev

24 October 2025 9	Karvan	1–2	Turan Tovuz	Shamakhi
14:30 (UTC+4)	Turabov (yellow card) 10'; Sno (yellow card) 41' (goal) 69'; Abdullayev (yellow card) 74'	Report	Miller (yellow card) 18'; Serrano 71'; Ozobić 77'	Stadium: City Stadium; Attendance: 300; Referee: Elvin Bayramov

2 November 2025 10	Turan Tovuz	2–1	Şamaxı	Tovuz
16:00 (UTC+4)	Serrano (yellow card) 45'; Olabe 45+2'; Jô 49'; Guseynov (yellow card) 90'; Baklov (yellow card) 90+5'	Report	Apolinário 45' (pen.); Msanga (yellow card) 90+1'	Stadium: City Stadium; Attendance: 5,800; Referee: Cavid Cəlilov

8 November 2025 11	Zira	0–0	Turan Tovuz	Zirə
18:44 AZT (UTC+4)	Renato (yellow card) 35'; Gomis (yellow card) 44'; Konaté (yellow card) 45'; Alıyev (yellow card) 45+1'	Report	Miller (yellow card) 45'; Olabe (yellow card) 45' (yellow-red card) 61'; Baklov (yellow card) 88'	Stadium: Zira Olympic Sport Complex Stadium; Attendance: 1,200; Referee: Aliyar Aghayev

22 November 2025 12	Araz-Naxçıvan	1–1	Turan Tovuz	Sumgait
15:00 AZT (UTC+4)	Simakala 21' (yellow card) 44'; Hasanalizade (yellow card) 32'; Andrade (yellow card) 77'	Report	Jô (yellow card) 54'; Silva (yellow card) 60'; Najafov (yellow card) 77'; Guseynov 79'	Stadium: City Stadium; Attendance: 250; Referee: Rəvan Həmzəzadə

28 November 2025 13	Turan Tovuz	0–0	Neftçi	Tovuz
18:30 AZT (UTC+4)	Henrique (yellow card) 16'	Report		Stadium: City Stadium; Attendance: 4,500; Referee: Farid Hajiyev

13 December 2025 15	Turan Tovuz	1–3	Sabah	Tovuz
16:30 AZT (UTC+4)	Ozobić 82'; Henrique (yellow card) 89'	Report	Mickels 30'; Nogueira (yellow card) 42'; Aliyev (yellow card) 54'; Simić 69'; Rakhmonaliev 79'; Seydiyev (yellow card) 80'; Malouda (yellow card) 83'; Pokatilov (yellow card) 90+2'; Lepinjica (yellow card) 90+4'	Stadium: City Stadium; Attendance: 3,000; Referee: Əliyar Ağayev

19 December 2025 16	Kapaz	0–2	Turan Tovuz	Yevlakh
14:00 AZT (UTC+4)	Fofana (yellow card) 12'; Verdasca (yellow card) 26'	Report	Serrano 6'; Silva (yellow card) 12'; Yusifli (yellow card) 36'; Jô 47'	Stadium: City Stadium; Attendance: 500; Referee: Kamal Umudlu

25 January 2026 17	Turan Tovuz	2–1	Sumgayit	Sumgait
16:00 (UTC+4)	Hurtado 13'; Sadykhov 69'; Silva (yellow card) 71'; Hacıyev (yellow card) 80'	Report	Pinto (yellow card) 52'; Hurtado 61' (o.g.)	Stadium: City Stadium; Attendance: 3,000; Referee: Kamal Umudlu

1 February 2025 18	Qarabağ	1–0	Turan Tovuz	Baku
18:30 (UTC+4)	Montiel (yellow card) 35'; Zoubir 41'; Janković (yellow card) 47'	Report	Hacıyev (yellow card) 11'; Ozobić (yellow card) 35'; Wadji (yellow card) 44'; Miller (yellow card) 55'	Stadium: Azersun Arena; Attendance: 2,617; Referee: Elçin Məsiyev

9 February 2026 19	Turan Tovuz	1–0	Karvan	Baku
18:30 (UTC+4)	Serrano 15' (pen.); Ozobić (yellow card) 83'	Report		Stadium: Azersun Arena; Attendance: 400; Referee: Vüqar Həsənli

16 February 2026 20	Şamaxı	0–0	Turan Tovuz	Shamakhi
14:30 (UTC+4)	Msanga (yellow card) 57'	Report		Stadium: City Stadium; Attendance: 1,200; Referee: Tural Qubanov

20 February 2026 21	Turan Tovuz	2–0	Zira	Baku
17:00 AZT (UTC+4)	Ozobić 11'; Silva 18'; Ginnelly (yellow card) 75'; Serrano (yellow card) 77'	Report	Renato (yellow card) 43'; Guima (yellow card) 60'; Gomis (yellow card) 90+1'	Stadium: Azersun Arena; Attendance: 250; Referee: Rəvan Həmzəzadə

24 February 2026 14	Gabala	0–3	Turan Tovuz	Qabala
15:00 AZT (UTC+4)		Report	Serrano 9'; Ozobić 18'; Sadykhov (yellow card) 34'; Keita 47' (o.g.)	Stadium: City Stadium; Attendance: 300; Referee: Cavid Cəlilov
Note: Match was abandoned in the 24th minute of 8 December 2025, due to heavy fog.

1 March 2026 22	Turan Tovuz	0–0	İmişli	Baku
16:30 (UTC+4)	Hackman (yellow card) 30'; Henrique (yellow card) 77'; Silva (yellow card) 86'	Report	Karaklajić (yellow card) 70'; Ronaldo (yellow card) 90+3'	Stadium: Azersun Arena; Attendance: 200; Referee: Fərid Hacıyev

9 March 2026 23	Neftçi	0–1	Turan Tovuz	Baku
20:30 AZT (UTC+4)	Mathew (yellow card) 34'	Report	Ozobić (yellow card) 47'; Jô 56'; Silva (yellow card) 90+4'	Stadium: Neftçi Arena; Attendance: 4,200; Referee: Əliyar Ağayev

15 March 2026 24	Kapaz	1–1	Turan Tovuz	Yevlakh
15:00 AZT (UTC+4)	Hajiyev (yellow card) 55'; Verdasca 72'	Report	Jô 61' (yellow card) 67'	Stadium: City Stadium; Attendance: 1,000; Referee: Tural Qurbanov

21 March 2026 25	Turan Tovuz	3–2	Gabala	Sumgait
16:00 AZT (UTC+4)	Hurtado 3', 49'; Guseynov (yellow card) 22'; Jô 59'; Miller (yellow card) 90+6'	Report	Ahmadov 29'; Miller 90+6' (o.g.)	Stadium: City Stadium; Attendance: 250; Referee: Kamal Umudlu

7 April 2026 26	İmişli	1–1	Turan Tovuz	Baku
15:00 (UTC+4)	Cardoso 45'; Viegas (yellow card) 84'; Almeida (yellow card) 90+5'	Report	Olabe (yellow card) 44'; Ronaldo 53' (o.g.); Hackman (yellow card) 68'; Serrano (yellow card) 90+7'	Stadium: Lökbatan Olympic Sport Complex Stadium; Attendance: 85; Referee: Rəvan Həmzəzadə

12 April 2026 27	Turan Tovuz	2–1	Sumgayit	Tovuz
18:00 (UTC+4)	Ozobić 9'; Hackman (yellow card) 45'; Jô 50'; Hacıyev (yellow card) 58'	Report	Ahmedzade (yellow card) 16'; Beskorovaynyi (yellow card) 45'; Senhadji 64'; Orujov (yellow card) 90'	Stadium: City Stadium; Attendance: 4,500; Referee: Kamranbəy Rəhimov

17 April 2026 28	Araz-Naxçıvan	0–3	Turan Tovuz	Baku
17:00 AZT (UTC+4)	Hasanalizade (yellow card) 84'; Santos (yellow card) 90+3'	Report	Wadji (yellow card) 46' (goal) 72'; Jô (yellow card) 52' (goal) 82', 90+2'; Hackman (yellow card) 87'; Yusifli (yellow card) 90+3'	Stadium: Dalga Arena; Attendance: 500; Referee: Rauf Cabarov

27 April 2026 29	Turan Tovuz	1–1	Zira	Tovuz
18:00 AZT (UTC+4)	Sadykhov 22'; Hurtado (yellow card) 83'	Report	Volkovi 63'; Mickels (yellow card) 87'	Stadium: City Stadium; Attendance: 4,000; Referee: Rəvan Həmzəzadə

4 May 2026 30	Qarabağ	2–1	Turan Tovuz	Baku
19:30 (UTC+4)	Andrade 50'; Bicalho (yellow card) 52'; Silva 54'; Medina (yellow card) 69'	Report	Sadykhov (yellow card) 18'; Jô (yellow card) 37'; Olabe (yellow card) 52'; Guseynov 76'	Stadium: Republican Stadium; Attendance: 2,414; Referee: Rəşad Əhmədov

10 May 2026 31	Turan Tovuz	1–0	Karvan	Tovuz
17:00 (UTC+4)	Guseynov 45+1'; Miller (yellow card) 58'; Hackman (yellow card) 68'	Report	Mickels (yellow card) 40'; Rüstamov (yellow card) 52'; Thompson (yellow card) 90+1'	Stadium: City Stadium; Attendance: 4,400; Referee: Əkbər Əhmədov

16 May 2026 32	Şamaxı	3–2	Turan Tovuz	Shamakhi
17:00 (UTC+4)	Agjabayov 10'; Balau 28'; Mammadov (yellow card) 68'; Rzayev 83'	Report	Najafov (yellow card) 36'; Miller (yellow card) 56'; Olabe (yellow card) 64'; Wadji 65'; Henrique (yellow card) 70'; Serrano 72'; Jô (yellow card) 90+4'	Stadium: City Stadium; Attendance: 650; Referee: Rəvan Həmzəzadə

22 May 2026 33	Turan Tovuz	1–2	Sabah	Tovuz
17:00 AZT (UTC+4)	Aliyev (yellow card) 12'; Guseynov 86'	Report	Lepinjica (yellow card) 12'; Malouda 15'; Dashdamirov (yellow card) 20'; Aliyev 63'	Stadium: City Stadium; Attendance: 450; Referee: Rauf Cabarov

=== Azerbaijan Cup ===
28 October 2025 Second round	Dinamo Baku	0–5	Turan Tovuz	Baku
17:00 AZT (UTC+4)	Jafarzadeh (yellow card) 74'	Report	Wadji 19', 51'; Aliyev 24'; Guseynov 41'; Dadaşev 90'	Stadium: Azersun Arena; Attendance: 200; Referee: Əli Əliyev

2 December 2025 Last 16	Shahdag Qusar	1–2	Turan Tovuz	Sumgait
15:00 AZT (UTC+4)	Ahmədov (yellow card) 53'; Jamalov 76' (pen.)	Report	Guseynov 4' (pen.); Souza; Olabe (yellow card) 75'	Stadium: Kapital Bank Arena; Attendance: 100; Referee: Rəvan Həmzəzadə

5 February 2026 Quarter-final 1st leg	Turan Tovuz	1–0	Kapaz	Baku
19:00 AZT (UTC+4)	Silva (yellow card) 17'; Wadji (yellow card) 41'; Hurtado 57'	Report		Stadium: Azersun Arena; Attendance: 300; Referee: Əli Əliyev

5 March 2026 Quarter-final 2nd leg	Kapaz	0–2 (0–3 agg.)	Turan Tovuz	Yevlakh
14:30 AZT (UTC+4)	Verdasca (yellow card) 31'; Şahverdiyev (yellow card) 45'	Report	Silva 13'; Hurtado 51'; Serrano (yellow card) 89'	Stadium: City Stadium; Attendance: 350; Referee: Cavid Cəlilov

3 April 2026 Semi-final 1st Leg	Turan Tovuz	0–2	Zira	Sumgait
17:30 AZT (UTC+4)		Report	Renato (yellow card) 23'; Aydın 55' (yellow card) 81'; Mickels 89'; Silva (yellow card) 90+1'	Stadium: City Stadium; Attendance: 400; Referee: Əliyar Ağayev

21 April 2026 Semi-final 2nd leg	Zira	0–0 (2–0 agg.)	Turan Tovuz	Zirə
19:00 AZT (UTC+4)	Aydın (yellow card) 70'; Alıyev (yellow card) 90+6'	Report	Jô (yellow card) 44'; Olabe (yellow card) 65'; Sadykhov (yellow card) 86'; Serrano (yellow card) 90+2'	Stadium: Zira Olympic Sport Complex Stadium; Attendance: 1,200; Referee: Əli Əliyev

== Squad statistics ==
As of match played 22 May 2026

=== Appearances and goals ===
No.	Pos	Nat	Player	Total		Premier League		Azerbaijan Cup	
No.	Pos	Nat	Player	Apps	Goals	Apps	Goals	Apps	Goals
1	GK	(Tajikistan) TJK	Oleg Baklov	23	0	22	0	1	0
2	DF	(Russia) RUS	Mark Mampassi	14	0	8+3	0	2+1	0
3	DF	(Brazil) BRA	Henrique	26	0	20+4	0	1+1	0
4	DF	(Azerbaijan) AZE	Şehriyar Aliyev	5	1	2+2	0	1	1
5	DF	(Panama) PAN	Roderick Miller	28	0	23+1	0	3+1	0
6	MF	(Azerbaijan) AZE	Farid Yusifli	18	0	4+10	0	2+2	0
7	DF	(Portugal) POR	Jorge Silva	31	2	25+2	1	4	1
8	MF	(Cape Verde) CPV	David Tavares	6	0	1+5	0	0	0
9	FW	(England) ENG	Josh Ginnelly	10	0	1+7	0	1+1	0
10	MF	(Azerbaijan) AZE	Khayal Najafov	21	0	8+9	0	2+2	0
11	MF	(Azerbaijan) AZE	Aykhan Guseynov	38	7	19+13	5	4+2	2
14	MF	(Azerbaijan) AZE	Murad Dadaşev	3	1	1	0	0+2	1
15	DF	(Togo) TOG	Emmanuel Hackman	36	0	30+1	0	5	0
17	MF	(Azerbaijan) AZE	Ragim Sadykhov	39	2	22+11	2	5+1	0
19	MF	(Spain) ESP	Roberto Olabe	36	3	22+9	3	3+2	0
23	MF	(Spain) ESP	Álex Serrano	35	7	29+2	7	4	0
29	MF	(Azerbaijan) AZE	Filip Ozobić	31	6	18+9	6	3+1	0
30	MF	(Azerbaijan) AZE	Mircamal Alizada	1	0	0	0	0+1	0
32	DF	(Colombia) COL	Haiderson Hurtado	37	5	32	3	4+1	2
39	MF	(Azerbaijan) AZE	Tural Bayramlı	1	0	0	0	1	0
41	GK	(Russia) RUS	Sergei Samok	16	0	11	0	5	0
42	MF	(Azerbaijan) AZE	Ismayil Ismayilov	2	0	0+1	0	0+1	0
60	MF	(Azerbaijan) AZE	Vüqar Bagyrov	2	0	0+1	0	0+1	0
73	DF	(Azerbaijan) AZE	Ulvu Madatov	1	0	0+1	0	0	0
88	DF	(Azerbaijan) AZE	Faiq Hacıyev	29	0	18+6	0	4+1	0
90	FW	(Brazil) BRA	Jô	35	10	21+9	10	3+2	0
97	MF	(Azerbaijan) AZE	Elchin Qasymov	1	0	0	0	0+1	0
99	FW	(Senegal) SEN	Ibrahima Wadji	30	4	11+14	2	3+2	2
Players away on loan:
Players who left Turan Tovuz during the season:
2	MF	(Azerbaijan) AZE	Abdulla Rzayev	4	0	2	0	2	0
21	FW	(Brazil) BRA	Alex Souza	16	4	13+2	3	1	1
77	MF	(Azerbaijan) AZE	Veysal Rzayev	5	0	0+3	0	2	0

=== Goal scorers ===
Place	Position	Nation	Number	Name	Premier League	Azerbaijan Cup	Total
1	FW	(Brazil)	90	Jô	10	0	10
2	MF	(Spain)	23	Álex Serrano	7	0	7
2	MF	(Azerbaijan)	11	Aykhan Guseynov	5	2	7
4	MF	(Azerbaijan)	29	Filip Ozobić	6	0	6
5	DF	(Colombia)	32	Haiderson Hurtado	3	2	5
6	FW	(Brazil)	21	Alex Souza	3	1	4
6	FW	(Senegal)	99	Ibrahima Wadji	2	2	4
8	MF	(Spain)	19	Roberto Olabe	3	0	3
9	MF	(Azerbaijan)	19	Ragim Sadykhov	2	0	2
9	DF	(Portugal)	7	Jorge Silva	1	1	2
9				Own goal	2	0	2
12	DF	(Azerbaijan)	4	Şehriyar Aliyev	0	1	1
12	MF	(Azerbaijan)	14	Murad Dadaşev	0	1	1
				TOTALS	44	10	54

=== Clean sheets ===
Place	Position	Nation	Number	Name	Premier League	Azerbaijan Cup	Total
1	GK	(Tajikistan)	1	Oleg Baklov	10	1	11
2	GK	(Russia)	41	Sergei Samok	6	3	9
				TOTALS	16	4	20

=== Disciplinary record ===
Number	Nation	Position	Name	Premier League		Azerbaijan Cup		Total	
Number	Nation	Position	Name	Booked	Sent off (straight red)	Booked	Sent off (straight red)	Booked	Sent off (straight red)
1	(Tajikistan)	GK	Oleg Baklov	3	0	0	0	3	0
3	(Brazil)	DF	Henrique	2	0	0	0	2	0
4	(Azerbaijan)	DF	Şehriyar Aliyev	1	0	0	0	1	0
5	(Panama)	DF	Roderick Miller	8	0	0	0	8	0
6	(Azerbaijan)	MF	Farid Yusifli	1	0	0	0	1	0
7	(Portugal)	DF	Jorge Silva	6	0	1	0	7	0
9	(England)	FW	Josh Ginnelly	1	0	0	0	1	0
10	(Azerbaijan)	MF	Khayal Najafov	2	0	0	0	2	0
11	(Azerbaijan)	MF	Aykhan Guseynov	3	0	0	0	3	0
15	(Togo)	DF	Emmanuel Hackman	5	0	0	0	5	0
17	(Azerbaijan)	MF	Ragim Sadykhov	2	0	1	0	3	0
19	(Spain)	MF	Roberto Olabe	6	1	2	0	8	1
23	(Spain)	MF	Álex Serrano	4	0	2	0	6	0
29	(Azerbaijan)	MF	Filip Ozobić	5	0	0	0	5	0
32	(Colombia)	DF	Haiderson Hurtado	1	0	0	0	1	0
88	(Azerbaijan)	DF	Faiq Hacıyev	1	0	0	0	1	0
90	(Brazil)	FW	Jô	6	0	1	0	7	0
99	(Senegal)	FW	Ibrahima Wadji	2	0	1	0	3	0
Players away on loan:
Players who left Turan Tovuz during the season:
2	(Azerbaijan)	MF	Abdulla Rzayev	1	0	0	0	1	0
21	(Brazil)	FW	Alex Souza	1	0	0	0	1	0
			TOTALS	61	1	8	0	69	1
