= 2024–25 Turan Tovuz season =

Turan Tovuz
2024–25 season
- Manager: Kurban Berdyev
- Stadium: City Stadium
- Premier League: 4th
- Azerbaijan Cup: Last 16 vs Sabah
- Top goalscorer: League: Alex Souza (7); All: Alex Souza (10)
- Highest home attendance: 6,500 (vs Qarabağ, 28 March 2025, Premier League)
- Lowest home attendance: 1,100 (vs Hypers Guba, 28 October 2024, Azerbaijan Cup)
- Average home league attendance: 4,361
- Biggest win: Turan Tovuz 7–2 Hypers Guba
- Biggest defeat: Kapaz 5–2 Turan Tovuz

The 2024–25 season was Turan Tovuz's 33rd year since its founding and its third consecutive season in Azerbaijan's premier league. The team will also compete in the Azerbaijan Cup.

== Season events ==
On 25 June, Turan Tovuz announced Kurban Berdyev as their new head coach, and the signings of Ivan Konovalov from Baltika Kaliningrad to a one-year contract with the option of an additional year, and Tural Bayramli from Araz-Naxçıvan to a two-year contract.

The following day, 26 June, Turan announced that signing of Sergey Samok from KAMAZ to a one-year contract.

On 1 July, Turan announced the signing of Christian, who'd last played for Sabah, to a one-year contract with the option of an additional year.

On 10 July, Veysal Rzayev joined Turan permanently having spent the previous two seasons on loan at the club.

On 22 July, Turan announced the signing of Arash Ghaderi from Zob Ahan to a one-year contract with the option of an additional year, and the signing of Rufat Ahmadov from Gabala to a two-year contract with the option of an additional year.

On 31 July, Turan announced the signing of Ibrahim Ramazanov from Gabala to a two-year contract.

On 6 January, Turan announced the signing of Anton Krachkovsky from Dynamo Makhachkala on loan for the rest of the season, and the signing of Ragim Sadykhov from Sumgayit.

On 8 January, Turan announced the signing of Orkhan Aliyev from Kapaz.

On 18 January, Turan announced the signing of Kauan from Brera Strumica.

On 24 January, Turan announced the signing of Jô from Chaves.

On 7 February, Turan announced the signing of Haiderson Hurtado from Jablonec.

== Squad ==
As of match played 25 May 2025

No.	Name	Nationality	Position	Date of birth (age)	Signed from	Signed in	Contract ends	Apps.	Goals
Goalkeepers
1	Ivan Konovalov	(Russia)	GK	18 August 1994 (aged 30)	Baltika Kaliningrad	2024	2025 (+1)	22	0
41	Sergei Samok	(Russia)	GK	15 February 2001 (aged 24)	KAMAZ	2024	2025	16	0
71	Mehman Haciyev	(Azerbaijan)	GK	28 January 1995 (aged 30)	Sumgayit	2016			
Defenders
3	Raul Mammadov	(Azerbaijan)	DF	28 April 2004 (aged 21)	Academy	2024		1	0
4	Şehriyar Aliyev	(Azerbaijan)	DF	25 December 1992 (aged 32)	Shamakhi	2022		81	5
5	Roderick Miller	(Panama)	DF	3 April 1992 (aged 33)	Al-Minaa	2023		52	10
6	Arash Ghaderi	(Iran)	DF	1 October 1998 (aged 26)	Zob Ahan	2024	2025 (+1)	22	0
15	Emmanuel Hackman	(Togo)	DF	14 May 1995 (aged 30)	Mladost Novi Sad	2023	2024 (+1)	62	4
25	Denis Marandici	(Moldova)	DF	18 September 1996 (aged 28)	Zrinjski Mostar	2023		65	2
32	Haiderson Hurtado	(Colombia)	DF	25 November 1995 (aged 29)	Jablonec	2025	2027	14	2
33	Eltun Turabov	(Azerbaijan)	DF	18 February 1997 (aged 28)	Sabah	2022		32	0
34	Huseyn Huseynov	(Azerbaijan)	DF	25 July 2006 (aged 18)	Academy	2024		1	2
39	Sadig Guliyev	(Azerbaijan)	DF	9 March 1995 (aged 30)	Machhindra	2022		33	2
40	Kauan	(Brazil)	DF	12 July 2000 (aged 24)	Brera Strumica	2025	2025 (+1)	15	2
44	Rufat Ahmadov	(Azerbaijan)	DF	22 September 2002 (aged 22)	Gabala	2024	2026 (+1)	15	0
88	Faig Hajiyev	(Azerbaijan)	DF	22 May 1999 (aged 26)	Gabala	2021			
Midfielders
7	Ismayil Zulfugarli	(Azerbaijan)	MF	16 April 2001 (aged 24)	on loan from Neftçi	2024		50	0
8	Tural Bayramli	(Azerbaijan)	MF	7 January 1998 (aged 27)	Araz-Naxçıvan	2024	2026	9	0
9	Christian	(Brazil)	MF	14 June 1989 (aged 35)	Sabah	2024	2025 (+1)	35	3
10	Khayal Najafov	(Azerbaijan)	MF	19 December 1997 (aged 27)	Neftçi	2024		95	5
11	Aykhan Guseynov	(Russia)	MF	3 September 1999 (aged 25)	Khimki	2022		104	15
13	Farid Yusifli	(Azerbaijan)	MF	20 February 2002 (aged 23)	Neftçi	2024		28	0
17	Ragim Sadykhov	(Azerbaijan)	MF	18 July 1996 (aged 28)	Sumgayit	2025	2027	17	2
23	Álex Serrano	(Spain)	MF	6 February 1995 (aged 30)	Hebar Pazardzhik	2023		72	5
27	Murad Dadaşev	(Azerbaijan)	MF	9 May 2004 (aged 21)	Unattached	2024		1	0
29	Anton Krachkovsky	(Russia)	MF	22 June 2002 (aged 22)	on loan from Dynamo Makhachkala	2025	2025	6	0
30	Mircamal Alizada	(Azerbaijan)	DF	13 December 2004 (aged 20)	Araz-Naxçıvan	2025		1	0
70	Mazahir Mammadzadeh	(Azerbaijan)	MF	12 August 2002 (aged 22)	Academy	2024		1	0
77	Veysal Rzayev	(Azerbaijan)	MF	24 October 2002 (aged 22)	Sabah	2024		81	2
Forwards
19	Orkhan Aliyev	(Azerbaijan)	FW	21 December 1995 (aged 29)	Kapaz	2025	2026	11	0
21	Alex Souza	(Brazil)	FW	24 March 2001 (aged 24)	Hegelmann	2024	2026	52	16
22	Nahid Aliyev	(Azerbaijan)	FW	2 February 2005 (aged 20)	Dynamo St.Petersburg	2024		1	0
90	Jô	(Brazil)	FW	1 May 1995 (aged 30)	Chaves	2025	2027	7	1
Out on loan
20	Ibrahim Ramazanov	(Azerbaijan)	DF	10 October 2004 (aged 20)	Gabala	2024	2026	0	0
99	Sadiq Shafiyev	(Azerbaijan)	MF	13 October 2005 (aged 19)	Academy	2023		12	1
Left during the season
7	Pachu	(Brazil)	FW	26 February 1996 (aged 29)	Trofense	2023	2025	24	5
80	Otto John	(Nigeria)	FW	25 January 1998 (aged 27)	Dukagjini	2023	2025	59	16
	Brunão	(Brazil)	DF	8 October 1997 (aged 27)	Leixões	2023	2024 (+1)	33	2

== Transfers ==
=== In ===
Date	Position	Nationality	Name	From	Fee	Ref.
25 June 2024	GK	(Russia)	Ivan Konovalov	Baltika Kaliningrad	Undisclosed	
25 June 2024	MF	(Azerbaijan)	Tural Bayramli	Araz-Naxçıvan	Undisclosed	
26 June 2024	GK	(Russia)	Sergey Samok	KAMAZ	Undisclosed	
1 July 2024	MF	(Brazil)	Christian	Unattached	Free	
10 July 2024	MF	(Azerbaijan)	Veysal Rzayev	Sabah	Undisclosed	
22 July 2024	DF	(Azerbaijan)	Rufat Ahmadov	Gabala	Undisclosed	
22 July 2024	DF	(Iran)	Arash Ghaderi	Zob Ahan	Undisclosed	
31 July 2024	DF	(Azerbaijan)	Ibrahim Ramazanov	Gabala	Undisclosed	
6 January 2025	MF	(Azerbaijan)	Ragim Sadykhov	Sumgayit	Undisclosed	
8 January 2025	FW	(Azerbaijan)	Orkhan Aliyev	Kapaz	Undisclosed	
18 January 2025	DF	(Brazil)	Kauan	Brera Strumica	Undisclosed	
24 January 2025	FW	(Brazil)	Jô	Chaves	Undisclosed	
7 February 2025	DF	(Colombia)	Haiderson Hurtado	Jablonec	Undisclosed	

=== Loans in ===
Date from	Position	Nationality	Name	From	Date to	Ref.
6 January 2025	MF	(Russia)	Anton Krachkovsky	Dynamo Makhachkala	End of season	

=== Out ===
Date	Position	Nationality	Name	To	Fee	Ref.
2 February 2025	FW	(Nigeria)	Otto John	Al-Madina	Undisclosed	

=== Loans out ===
Date from	Position	Nationality	Name	To	Date to	Ref.
3 February 2025	MF	(Azerbaijan)	Sadiq Shafiyev	Kapaz	End of season	
11 February 2025	DF	(Azerbaijan)	İbrahim Ramazanov	Gabala	30 June 2026	

=== Released ===
Date	Position	Nationality	Name	Joined	Date	Ref
2 August 2024	DF	(Brazil)	Brunão	Guarani		
8 August 2024	FW	(Brazil)	Pachu	Kapaz	24 September 2024	

== Friendlies ==
9 January 2025	Gloria Buzău (Romania)	2 – 0	(Azerbaijan) Turan Tovuz	Turkey
16:30 UZT (UTC+5)	Budescu 9'; Ișfan 86'	Report

12 January 2025	Turan Tovuz (Azerbaijan)	0 – 2	(Uzbekistan) Pakhtakor	Turkey
19:00 UZT (UTC+5)		Report	Mukhammadjonov 11'; Resan 82'

== Competitions ==
=== Overall record ===
Competition	First match	Last match	Starting round	Final position	Record							
Competition	First match	Last match	Starting round	Final position	Pld	W	D	L	GF	GA	GD	Win %
Premier League	2 August 2024	25 May 2025	Matchday 1	4th	36	14	13	9	45	39	+6	38.89
Azerbaijan Cup	28 October 2024	3 December 2024	Second round	Last 16	2	1	1	0	9	4	+5	50.00
Total					38	15	14	9	54	43	+11	39.47

Last updated: 25 May 2025
Source: Competitions

=== Premier League ===
==== League table ====
Pos	Team	Pld	W	D	L	GF	GA	GD	Pts	Qualification or relegation
2	Zira	36	23	5	8	59	27	+32	74	Qualification for the Conference League second qualifying round
3	Araz-Naxçıvan	36	15	13	8	34	29	+5	58	Qualification for the Conference League second qualifying round
4	Turan Tovuz	36	14	13	9	45	39	+6	55	
5	Sabah	36	10	18	8	50	46	+4	48	Qualification for the Europa League first qualifying round (Note: Sabah qualified for the Europa League first qualifying round as the 2024–25 Azerbaijan Cup winners.)
6	Neftçi	36	10	13	13	39	49	−10	43	

Source: Soccerway
Rules for classification: 1) Points; 2) Matches won; 3) Goal difference; 4) Goals scored; 5) Head-to-head points; 6) Head-to-head goal difference; 7) Lower number of points based on yellow and red cards; 8) Draw.

==== Results summary ====
Overall								Home						Away					
Pld	W	D	L	GF	GA	GD	Pts	W	D	L	GF	GA	GD	W	D	L	GF	GA	GD
36	14	13	9	45	39	+6	55	8	5	5	23	20	+3	6	8	4	22	19	+3

Last updated: 25 May 2025.

==== Results by round ====
Round	1	2	3	4	5	6	7	8	9	10	11	12	13	14	15	16	17	18	19	20	21	22	23	24	25	26	27	28	29	30	31	32	33	34	35	36
Ground	A	H	A	A	H	A	H	A	H	A	H	H	A	H	A	H	A	H	A	A	H	A	H	A	H	A	H	H	A	H	A	H	A	H	A	H
Result	D	W	W	W	W	D	L	D	W	W	W	D	D	D	L	W	D	D	L	W	D	L	W	W	L	D	L	L	D	W	D	D	L	L	W	W
Position	7	3	2	1	1	2	4	4	3	3	2	3	3	3	3	3	3	3	4	4	4	4	4	4	4	4	4	4	4	4	4	4	4	4	4	4

Updated to match(es) played on 25 May 2025. Source:
A = Away; H = Home; W = Win; D = Draw; L = Loss

==== Matches ====
The league schedule was released on 19 July 2024.

3 August 2024 1	Neftçi	0–0	Turan Tovuz	Baku
18:30 AZT (UTC+4)	Matias (yellow card) 9'	Report	S.Aliyev (yellow card) 42'; Hajiyev (yellow card) 57'	Stadium: Neftçi Arena; Attendance: 4,500; Referee: Əliyar Ağayev

11 August 2024 2	Turan Tovuz	1–0	Sumgayit	Tovuz
18:45 AZT (UTC+4)	S.Aliyev (yellow card) 13'; Najafov 34'; Christian (yellow card) 62'; Marandici (yellow card) 63'; Rzayev (yellow card) 81'	Report	Medeiros (yellow card) 59'; Mossi (yellow card) 75'	Stadium: City Stadium; Attendance: 4,900; Referee: Tural Qurbanov

17 August 2024 3	Kapaz	0–3	Turan Tovuz	Tovuz
18:15 AZT (UTC+4)	Braga (yellow card) 50'; Samadov (yellow card) 76'; Atakishiyev (yellow card) 84'; Shahverdiyev (yellow card) 90+2'	Report	Najafov 15'; Miller 19'; S.Aliyev (yellow card) 45+2'; Christian 62'; Souza (yellow card) 66'	Stadium: City Stadium; Attendance: 5,500; Referee: Cavid Cəlilov

24 August 2024 4	Qarabağ	0–1	Turan Tovuz	Baku
18:15 AZT (UTC+4)	Benzia (yellow card) 19'; Richard (yellow card) 20'; Medina (yellow card) 89'	Report	Miller (yellow card) 5'; Serrano (yellow card) 15'; John 18' (pen.)	Stadium: Azersun Arena; Attendance: 2,000; Referee: Fərid Hacıyev

30 August 2024 5	Turan Tovuz	1–0	Sabail	Tovuz
17:45 AZT (UTC+4)	Serrano 34'; Hajiyev (yellow card) 78'; S.Aliyev (yellow card) 80'	Report	Lytvyn (yellow card) 49'; Çelik (yellow card) 80'; Abdullazade (yellow card) 86'	Stadium: City Stadium; Attendance: 5,500; Referee: Rəşad Əhmədov

15 September 2024 6	Sabah	2–2	Turan Tovuz	Masazir
20:30 AZT (UTC+4)	Sekidika 6', 46'; Mickels (yellow card) 44'; Seydiyev (yellow card) 56'; Lepinjica (yellow card) 72'	Report	Turabov (yellow card) 27'; Miller 35'; John (yellow card) 73'; Guseynov 76' (yellow card) 90+4'	Stadium: Bank Respublika Arena; Attendance: 2,420; Referee: Əliyar Ağayev

21 September 2024 7	Turan Tovuz	1–2	Araz-Naxçıvan	Tovuz
18:00 AZT (UTC+4)	Guseynov 48'; Konovalov (yellow card) 90+5'	Report	Abdullayev (yellow card) 8'; Ramon (yellow card) 14' (goal) 44'; Santos 57' (yellow card) 57'; Buludov (yellow card) 82'; Isgandarov (yellow card) 90+5'	Stadium: City Stadium; Attendance: 5,000; Referee: Elçin Məsiyev

29 September 2024 8	Shamakhi	2–2	Turan Tovuz	Shamakhi
16:00 AZT (UTC+4)	Kantaria (yellow card) 9'; Pusi (yellow card) 17' (goal) 48'; Bakić (yellow card) 47'; Mickels (yellow card) 88'; Agjabayov 90'	Report	Shafiyev 5'; Marandici (yellow card) 15'; Ghaderi (yellow card) 24'; Rzayev (yellow card) 33'; S.Aliyev (yellow card) 84'; Najafov (yellow card) 90+4'; Christian 90+5' (pen.)	Stadium: City Stadium; Attendance: 2,000; Referee: Tural Qurbanov

6 October 2024 9	Turan Tovuz	1–0	Zira	Tovuz
17:45 AZT (UTC+4)	Hajiyev 89'; Ahmadov (yellow card) 90'; Zulfugarli (yellow card) 90+3'	Report	Isayev (yellow card) 90+4'	Stadium: City Stadium; Attendance: 4,000; Referee: Rəvan Həmzəzadə

20 October 2024 10	Sumgayit	2–4	Turan Tovuz	Sumgait
20:00 AZT (UTC+4)	Vujnović 33'; Muradov (yellow card) 45+3'; Mustafayev (yellow card) 80'; Guliyev 87'	Report	Serrano 17'; John 26'; Rzayev 28'; Souza 78'; S.Aliyev (yellow card) 84'	Stadium: City Stadium; Attendance: 1,500; Referee: İnqilab Məmmədov

25 October 2024 11	Turan Tovuz	2–1	Kapaz	Tovuz
19:00 AZT (UTC+4)	Rzayev 15' (yellow card) 44'; Shafiyev (yellow card) 19'; Christian (yellow card) 55'; Hajiyev (yellow card) 63'; Souza (yellow card) 67'; Hackman 90+4'	Report	Pachu (yellow card) 2' (goal) 76' (pen.); Suleymanov (yellow card) 30'; O.Aliyev (yellow card) 53'; Hüseynli (yellow card) 90+3'; Verdasca (yellow card) 90+5' (yellow-red card) 90+5'	Stadium: City Stadium; Attendance: 3,800; Referee: Rauf Allahverdiyev

1 November 2024 12	Turan Tovuz	0–0	Qarabağ	Tovuz
18:30 AZT (UTC+4)	Souza (yellow card) 76'	Report	P.Andrade (yellow card) 76'	Stadium: City Stadium; Attendance: 6,000; Referee: Əliyar Ağayev

9 November 2024 13	Sabail	1–1	Turan Tovuz	Baku
17:00 AZT (UTC+4)	Abdullazade (yellow card) 20' (goal) 40'; Çelik (yellow card) 43'	Report	Hackman (yellow card) 22'; Christian (penalty missed) 44'; Hajiyev 88'	Stadium: Bayil Arena; Attendance: 700; Referee: İnqilab Məmmədov

24 November 2024 14	Turan Tovuz	1–1	Sabah	Tovuz
17:00 AZT (UTC+4)	John 46'; Ghaderi (yellow card) 90+2'	Report	Camalov (yellow card) 33'; Kupusović (yellow card) 44'; Mickels 67' (yellow card) 83'; Irazabal (yellow card) 90+1'	Stadium: City Stadium; Attendance: 4,500; Referee: Rəşad Əhmədov

29 November 2024 15	Araz-Naxçıvan	1–0	Turan Tovuz	Baku
16:00 AZT (UTC+4)	Wanderson (yellow card) 54'; Santos 75'; Avram (yellow card) 89'	Report	S.Aliyev (yellow card) 83'	Stadium: Dalga Arena; Attendance: 200; Referee: Cavid Cəlilov

9 December 2024 16	Turan Tovuz	3–2	Shamakhi	Tovuz
19:00 AZT (UTC+4)	Miller 22', 90+4' (yellow card) 90+4'; Serrano 60' (pen.); Haciyev (yellow card) 90+4'; Turabov (yellow card) 90+4'	Report	Pusi 12'; Adilkhanov 40'; Konaté (yellow card) 57'	Stadium: City Stadium; Attendance: 3,000; Referee: Kamal Umudlu

15 December 2024 17	Zira	0–0	Turan Tovuz	Zirə
16:00 AZT (UTC+4)		Report		Stadium: Zira Olympic Sport Complex Stadium; Attendance: 750; Referee: Rauf Cabarov

21 December 2024 18	Turan Tovuz	1–1	Neftçi	Tovuz
16:00 AZT (UTC+4)	Ghaderi (yellow card) 30'; Yusifli (yellow card) 45+2'; Souza 54' (yellow card) 75'; S.Aliyev (yellow card) 90+4'	Report	Ozobić 45'; Haghverdi (yellow card) 85'; Safarov (yellow card) 89'; Matias (yellow card) 90+1'	Stadium: City Stadium; Attendance: 3,000; Referee: İnqilab Məmmədov

19 January 2025 19	Kapaz	5–2	Turan Tovuz	Tovuz
16:00 AZT (UTC+4)	Manafov 17', 56'; Khvalko 42'; Pachu (penalty missed) 55'; Rogério (yellow card) 60'; Ba 75'; L'Koucha 90+2'	Report	Christian 5'; O.Aliyev (yellow card) 33'; Sadykhov 35'; Ghaderi (yellow card) 60'; Ahmadov (yellow card) 60'; Yusifli (yellow card) 60'; Zulfugarli (yellow card) 90+7'	Stadium: City Stadium; Attendance: 4,300; Referee: Rəvan Həmzəzadə

26 January 2025 20	Qarabağ	1–2	Turan Tovuz	Baku
18:30 AZT (UTC+4)	Qurbanlı 7'; P.Andrade (yellow card) 74'; Janković (yellow card) 90+2'	Report	Sadykhov (yellow card) 38'; Kauan 90'; John 90+4'	Stadium: Republican Stadium; Attendance: 1,200; Referee: Cavid Cəlilov

1 February 2025 21	Turan Tovuz	1–1	Sabail	Tovuz
16:00 AZT (UTC+4)	Serrano 29'; Kauan (red card) 45'; Samok (yellow card) 90+3'	Report	Ahmadov (yellow card) 45'; Queta 82'	Stadium: City Stadium; Attendance: 5,000; Referee: Tural Qurbanov

9 February 2025 22	Sabah	2–1	Turan Tovuz	Masazir
17:00 AZT (UTC+4)	Khaybulayev (yellow card) 13'; Šafranko 50' (pen.); Sekidika 61'; Chakla (yellow card) 88'	Report	Souza 15'; Ghaderi (yellow card) 25'; Rzayev (yellow card) 44'; Christian (yellow card) 64'	Stadium: Bank Respublika Arena; Attendance: 800; Referee: İnqilab Məmmədov

16 February 2025 23	Turan Tovuz	1–0	Araz-Naxçıvan	Tovuz
16:00 AZT (UTC+4)	Hurtado 86'; Konovalov (yellow card) 90+4'	Report	Ribeiro (red card) 47'	Stadium: City Stadium; Attendance: 4,100; Referee: Əliyar Ağayev

23 February 2025 24	Shamakhi	0–1	Turan Tovuz	Shamakhi
14:30 AZT (UTC+4)	Adilkhanov (yellow card) 58'; Konaté (yellow card) 87'; Agjabayov (yellow card) 87'	Report	Souza 30' (yellow card) 46'; Guseynov (yellow card) 90+1'	Stadium: City Stadium; Attendance: 600; Referee: Kamal Umudlu

4 March 2025 25	Turan Tovuz	0–2	Zira	Tovuz
18:00 AZT (UTC+4)		Report	Alıyev 5' (pen.); Djibrilla 57'; Gomis (yellow card) 82'	Stadium: City Stadium; Attendance: 4,500; Referee: Elçin Məsiyev

10 March 2025 26	Neftçi	1–1	Turan Tovuz	Baku
19:30 AZT (UTC+4)	Haghverdi (yellow card) 77'; Camalov (yellow card) 80'; Sambou 88'	Report	Hackman (red card) 18'; Serrano (yellow card) 67'; Hurtado 90+5'	Stadium: Neftçi Arena; Attendance: 1,200; Referee: Rəvan Həmzəzadə

16 March 2025 27	Turan Tovuz	1–2	Sumgayit	Tovuz
18:30 AZT (UTC+4)	Guseynov 8'	Report	Suleymanli 18' (yellow card) 82'; Abdikholikov 64'	Stadium: City Stadium; Attendance: 4,700; Referee: Əliyar Ağayev

28 March 2025 28	Turan Tovuz	1–4	Qarabağ	Tovuz
19:30 AZT (UTC+4)	Souza 30'; Hajiyev (yellow card) 32'; Hackman (yellow card) 45+2'; Christian (yellow card) 58'; Ghaderi (yellow card) 80'	Report	Kady 16' (pen.), 84'; Akhundzade 32'; P.Andrade (yellow card) 35'; Kashchuk 90+2'	Stadium: City Stadium; Attendance: 6,500; Referee: Cavid Cəlilov

5 April 2025 29	Sabail	0–0	Turan Tovuz	Baku
17:00 AZT (UTC+4)	Çelik (yellow card) 90+4'	Report	Konovalov (yellow card) 64'; Kauan (yellow card) 71'; Hurtado (yellow card) 77'	Stadium: Bayil Arena; Attendance: 750; Referee: Rəşad Əhmədov

12 April 2025 30	Turan Tovuz	2–1	Sabah	Tovuz
17:00 AZT (UTC+4)	Guseynov 56' (yellow card) 69'; Jô 57'; Sadykhov (yellow card) 63'; Hurtado (yellow card) 82'	Report	Nuriyev 14'; Šafranko (yellow card) 21' (yellow-red card) 45+2'; Sekidika (yellow card) 51'	Stadium: City Stadium; Attendance: 2,500; Referee: Elçin Məsiyev

18 April 2025 31	Araz-Naxçıvan	1–1	Turan Tovuz	Baku
19:00 AZT (UTC+4)	Paro 53'; Wanderson (yellow card) 67' (yellow-red card) 78'	Report	Hajiyev 34' (yellow card) 43'; Sadykhov (yellow card) 90+4'	Stadium: Dalga Arena; Attendance: 500; Referee: Əliyar Ağayev

25 April 2025 32	Turan Tovuz	1–1	Shamakhi	Tovuz
19:00 AZT (UTC+4)	Hajiyev (yellow card) 26'; Kauan 54'; Serrano (yellow card) 64'	Report	Agjabayov (yellow card) 34'; Konaté 56'	Stadium: City Stadium; Attendance: 3,000; Referee: Kamal Umudlu

2 May 2025 33	Zira	1–0	Turan Tovuz	Zirə
20:00 AZT (UTC+4)	Soumah 48'; Nuriyev (yellow card) 50'; Utzig (yellow card) 52'; Alıyev (red card) 59'; Zebli (yellow card) 84'	Report	O.Aliyev (yellow card) 29'; Guseynov (yellow card) 56'; Yusifli (yellow card) 78'; Hurtado (yellow card) 90+3'	Stadium: Zira Olympic Sport Complex Stadium; Attendance: 1,200; Referee: Rəvan Həmzəzadə

10 May 2025 34	Turan Tovuz	1–2	Neftçi	Tovuz
19:30 AZT (UTC+4)	Sadykhov 16'; Hackman (yellow card) 64'; Rzayev (yellow card) 90+2'	Report	Mahmudov 10'; Darboe 33'; Koffi (yellow card) 63'; Salahlı (yellow card) 64'; Jafarov (yellow card) 90+4'	Stadium: City Stadium; Attendance: 4,500; Referee: Rəşad Əhmədov

17 May 2025 35	Sumgayit	0–1	Turan Tovuz	Sumgait
17:00 AZT (UTC+4)	Kahat (yellow card) 45+2'	Report	Hackman 30'; Kauan (yellow card) 67'	Stadium: City Stadium; Attendance: 3,500; Referee: Tural Qurbanov

25 May 2025 36	Turan Tovuz	4–0	Kapaz	Tovuz
17:00 AZT (UTC+4)	Souza 10', 23'; Manafov 42' (o.g.); Guseynov 44'	Report	Verdasca (yellow card) 6'; Paná (yellow card) 38'; Məmmədov (yellow card) 90+2'	Stadium: City Stadium; Attendance: 4,000; Referee: Fərid Hacıyev

=== Azerbaijan Cup ===
28 October 2024 Second round	Turan Tovuz	7–2	Hypers Guba	Tovuz
20:00 AZT (UTC+4)	Əhmədov 14' (o.g.); Huseynov 16', 26'; Souza 41', 41'; Guliyev 57'; Əliyev 63'	Report	68', 70' Alakbarov	Stadium: Tovuz City Stadium; Attendance: 1,100; Referee: Akbar Ahmadov

3 December 2024 Last 16	Turan Tovuz	2–2 (a.e.t.) (1–3 p)	Sabah	Tovuz
18:00 AZT (UTC+4)	Souza 28'; John 113'	Report	Irazabal 45+2'; Guliyev (yellow card) 57'; Letić (yellow card) 89'; Kupusović 118'	Stadium: City Stadium; Attendance: 3,000; Referee: Inqilab Mammadov
	Penalties
	Aliyev (penalty scored); Guseynov (penalty missed); Rzayev (penalty missed); John (penalty missed)		Parris (penalty missed); Chakla (penalty scored); Aliyev (penalty scored); Mickels (penalty scored)

== Squad statistics ==
As of match played 25 May 2025

=== Appearances and goals ===
No.	Pos	Nat	Player	Total		Premier League		Azerbaijan Cup	
No.	Pos	Nat	Player	Apps	Goals	Apps	Goals	Apps	Goals
1	GK	(Russia) RUS	Ivan Konovalov	22	0	22	0	0	0
3	DF	(Azerbaijan) AZE	Raul Mammadov	1	0	0	0	0+1	0
4	DF	(Azerbaijan) AZE	Şehriyar Aliyev	19	1	16+1	0	2	1
5	DF	(Panama) PAN	Roderick Miller	17	4	12+5	4	0	0
6	DF	(Iran) IRI	Arash Ghaderi	22	0	7+13	0	2	0
7	MF	(Azerbaijan) AZE	Ismayil Zulfugarli	33	0	26+5	0	1+1	0
8	MF	(Azerbaijan) AZE	Tural Bayramli	9	0	4+4	0	1	0
9	MF	(Brazil) BRA	Christian	35	3	32+2	3	1	0
10	MF	(Azerbaijan) AZE	Khayal Najafov	29	2	14+13	2	2	0
11	MF	(Russia) RUS	Aykhan Guseynov	35	4	14+19	4	1+1	0
13	MF	(Azerbaijan) AZE	Farid Yusifli	18	0	7+9	0	1+1	0
15	DF	(Togo) TOG	Emmanuel Hackman	36	2	35	2	1	0
17	MF	(Azerbaijan) AZE	Ragim Sadykhov	17	2	17	2	0	0
19	FW	(Azerbaijan) AZE	Orkhan Aliyev	11	0	5+6	0	0	0
21	FW	(Brazil) BRA	Alex Souza	34	10	25+7	7	2	3
22	FW	(Azerbaijan) AZE	Nahid Aliyev	1	0	0	0	0+1	0
23	MF	(Spain) ESP	Álex Serrano	36	4	34+1	4	1	0
25	DF	(Moldova) MDA	Denis Marandici	15	0	13+1	0	1	0
27	MF	(Azerbaijan) AZE	Murad Dadaşev	1	0	0	0	0+1	0
29	MF	(Russia) RUS	Anton Krachkovsky	6	0	1+5	0	0	0
30	MF	(Azerbaijan) AZE	Mircamal Alizada	1	0	0+1	0	0	0
32	DF	(Colombia) COL	Haiderson Hurtado	14	2	13+1	2	0	0
33	DF	(Azerbaijan) AZE	Eltun Turabov	6	0	2+4	0	0	0
34	DF	(Azerbaijan) AZE	Huseyn Huseynov	1	2	0	0	0+1	2
39	DF	(Azerbaijan) AZE	Sadig Guliyev	2	1	1	0	1	1
40	DF	(Brazil) BRA	Kauan	15	2	15	2	0	0
41	GK	(Russia) RUS	Sergei Samok	16	0	14	0	2	0
44	DF	(Azerbaijan) AZE	Rufat Ahmadov	15	0	5+9	0	1	0
70	MF	(Azerbaijan) AZE	Mazahir Mammadzadeh	1	0	0	0	0+1	0
77	MF	(Azerbaijan) AZE	Veysal Rzayev	24	2	7+16	2	0+1	0
88	DF	(Azerbaijan) AZE	Faig Hajiyev	34	3	32+1	3	1	0
90	FW	(Brazil) BRA	Jô	7	1	4+3	1	0	0
Players away on loan:
99	MF	(Azerbaijan) AZE	Sadiq Shafiyev	7	1	4+2	1	1	0
Players who left Turan Tovuz during the season:
80	FW	(Nigeria) NGR	Otto John	22	5	16+5	4	0+1	1

=== Goal scorers ===
Place	Position	Nation	Number	Name	Premier League	Azerbaijan Cup	Total
1	FW	(Brazil)	21	Alex Souza	7	3	10
2	MF	(Russia)	11	Aykhan Guseynov	5	0	5
2	FW	(Nigeria)	80	Otto John	4	1	5
4	DF	(Panama)	5	Roderick Miller	4	0	4
4	MF	(Spain)	23	Álex Serrano	4	0	4
6	MF	(Azerbaijan)	88	Faig Hajiyev	3	0	3
7	MF	(Brazil)	9	Christian	3	0	3
7	MF	(Azerbaijan)	10	Khayal Najafov	2	0	2
7	MF	(Azerbaijan)	77	Veysal Rzayev	2	0	2
7	DF	(Colombia)	32	Haiderson Hurtado	2	0	2
7	DF	(Brazil)	40	Kauan	2	0	2
7	MF	(Azerbaijan)	17	Ragim Sadykhov	2	0	2
7	DF	(Togo)	15	Emmanuel Hackman	2	0	2
7	DF	(Azerbaijan)	34	Huseyn Huseynov	0	2	2
7				Own goal	1	1	2
16	MF	(Azerbaijan)	97	Sadiq Shafiyev	1	0	1
16	FW	(Brazil)	90	Jô	1	0	1
16	DF	(Azerbaijan)	39	Sadig Guliyev	0	1	1
16	DF	(Azerbaijan)	4	Şehriyar Aliyev	0	1	1
				TOTALS	45	9	54

=== Clean sheets ===
Place	Position	Nation	Number	Name	Premier League	Azerbaijan Cup	Total
1	GK	(Russia)	1	Ivan Konovalov	10	0	10
2	GK	(Russia)	41	Sergei Samok	3	0	3
				TOTALS	13	0	13

=== Disciplinary record ===
Number	Nation	Position	Name	Premier League		Azerbaijan Cup		Total	
Number	Nation	Position	Name	Booked	Sent off (straight red)	Booked	Sent off (straight red)	Booked	Sent off (straight red)
1	(Russia)	GK	Ivan Konovalov	3	0	0	0	3	0
4	(Azerbaijan)	DF	Şehriyar Aliyev	8	0	0	0	8	0
5	(Panama)	DF	Roderick Miller	2	0	0	0	2	0
6	(Iran)	DF	Arash Ghaderi	6	0	0	0	6	0
7	(Azerbaijan)	MF	Ismayil Zulfugarli	2	0	0	0	2	0
9	(Brazil)	MF	Christian	4	0	0	0	4	0
10	(Azerbaijan)	MF	Khayal Najafov	1	0	0	0	1	0
11	(Russia)	MF	Aykhan Guseynov	4	0	0	0	4	0
13	(Azerbaijan)	MF	Farid Yusifli	3	0	0	0	3	0
15	(Togo)	DF	Emmanuel Hackman	3	1	0	0	3	1
17	(Azerbaijan)	MF	Ragim Sadykhov	4	0	0	0	4	0
19	(Azerbaijan)	FW	Orkhan Aliyev	2	0	0	0	2	0
21	(Brazil)	FW	Alex Souza	5	0	0	0	5	0
23	(Spain)	MF	Álex Serrano	4	0	0	0	4	0
25	(Moldova)	DF	Denis Marandici	2	0	0	0	2	0
32	(Colombia)	DF	Haiderson Hurtado	3	0	0	0	3	0
33	(Azerbaijan)	MF	Eltun Turabov	2	0	0	0	2	0
40	(Brazil)	DF	Kauan	2	1	0	0	2	1
41	(Russia)	GK	Sergei Samok	1	0	0	0	1	0
44	(Azerbaijan)	DF	Rufat Ahmadov	2	0	0	0	2	0
71	(Azerbaijan)	GK	Mehman Haciyev	1	0	0	0	1	0
77	(Azerbaijan)	MF	Veysal Rzayev	5	0	0	0	5	0
88	(Azerbaijan)	DF	Faig Hajiyev	6	0	0	0	6	0
Players away on loan:
97	(Azerbaijan)	MF	Sadiq Shafiyev	1	0	0	0	1	0
Players who left Turan Tovuz during the season:
80	(Nigeria)	FW	Otto John	1	0	0	0	1	0
			TOTALS	77	2	0	0	77	2
