= Alex Souza =

Brazilian footballer

Personal information
- Full name: Alex Aparecido de Souza Alcântara
- Date of birth: 24 March 2001 (age 25)
- Place of birth: Três Lagoas, Brazil
- Height: 1.80 m (5 ft 11 in)
- Position: Forward

Team information
- Current team: Kyoto Sanga
- Number: 17

Youth career
- Santos

Senior career*
Years	Team	Apps	(Gls)
2021–2023	Hegelmann	45	(8)
2023	Boluspor	3	(0)
2023–2024	Hegelmann	17	(2)
2024–2026	Turan Tovuz	65	(16)
2026–	Kyoto Sanga	6	(1)
- * Club domestic league appearances and goals as of 1 August 2026

Alex Aparecido de Souza Alcântara, known as Alex Souza (born 24 March 2001) is a Brazilian professional footballer who plays as a forward for Kyoto Sanga in the J1 League.

== Career ==
On 16 December 2022, Hegelmann announced that Souza had left the club.

On 21 June 2023, A Lyga club Hegelmann announced the return of Souza to the club after six-months with |Boluspor in the TFF 1. Lig.

On 12 January 2024, Azerbaijan Premier League club Turan Tovuz announced the signing of Souza from Hegelmann.

On 5 January 2026, Souza left Turan Tovuz to sign for J1 League club Kyoto Sanga.

== Career statistics ==
As of match played 1 August 2026

Appearances and goals by club, season and competition
Club	Season	League			National Cup		Continental		Other		Total	
Club	Season	Division	Apps	Goals	Apps	Goals	Apps	Goals	Apps	Goals	Apps	Goals
Hegelmann	2021	A Lyga	12	1	2	0	—		—		12	1
Hegelmann	2022	A Lyga	33	7	4	1	—		—		33	7
Hegelmann	Total		45	8	6	1	-	-	-	-	45	8
Boluspor	2022–23	TFF 1. Lig	3	0	0	0	—		—		3	0
Hegelmann	2021	A Lyga	17	2	0	0	2 (Note: Appearances in UEFA Conference League)	0	—		19	2
Turan Tovuz	2023–24	Azerbaijan Premier League	18	6	0	0	-		-		18	6
Turan Tovuz	2024–25	Azerbaijan Premier League	32	7	2	3	-		-		34	10
Turan Tovuz	2025–26	Azerbaijan Premier League	15	3	1	1	-		-		16	4
Turan Tovuz	Total		65	16	3	4	-	-	-	-	68	20
Kyoto Sanga	2026	J1 League	6	1	0	0	—		—		6	1
Career total			136	27	9	5	2	0	-	-	147	32
