= Ivan Konovalov =

Russian footballer

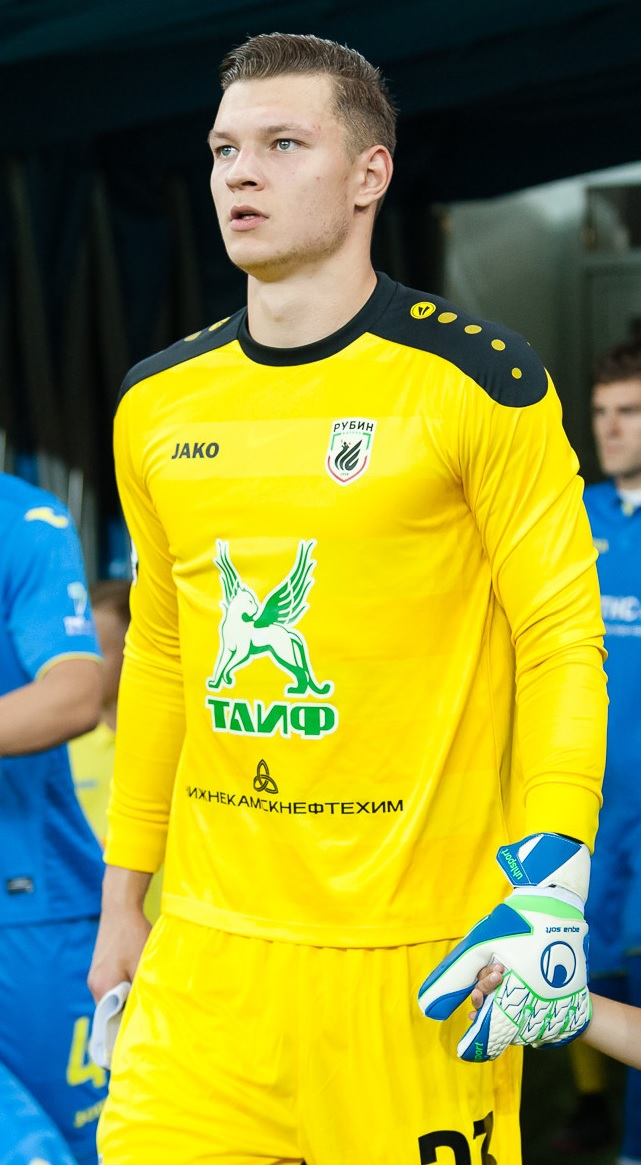
- Konovalov with Rubin Kazan in 2018

Personal information
- Full name: Ivan Andreyevich Konovalov
- Date of birth: 18 August 1994 (age 32)
- Place of birth: Balashikha, Russia
- Height: 1.91 m (6 ft 3 in)
- Position: Goalkeeper

Team information
- Current team: Yelimay
- Number: 32

Youth career
- 2011–2013: Spartak Moscow

Senior career*
| Years | Team | Apps | (Gls) |
| 2013–2014 | Amkar Perm | 0 | (0) |
| 2014 | SKChF Sevastopol | 8 | (0) |
| 2015 | Astrakhan | 13 | (0) |
| 2015–2016 | Radnički Niš | 6 | (0) |
| 2017 | OFK Bačka | 11 | (0) |
| 2017–2018 | Torpedo-BelAZ Zhodino | 12 | (0) |
| 2018–2022 | Rubin Kazan | 20 | (0) |
| 2021 | → Ural Yekaterinburg (loan) | 1 | (0) |
| 2021 | → Ural-2 Yekaterinburg (loan) | 1 | (0) |
| 2022–2023 | Livingston | 7 | (0) |
| 2023 | Tobol | 16 | (0) |
| 2024 | Baltika Kaliningrad | 0 | (0) |
| 2024–2025 | Turan Tovuz | 22 | (0) |
| 2025 | Dinamo Minsk | 14 | (0) |
| 2026 | Altai | 14 | (0) |
| 2026– | Yelimay | 13 | (0) |
- * Club domestic league appearances and goals as of 1 November 2026

Ivan Andreyevich Konovalov (Russian: Иван Андреевич Коновалов; born 18 August 1994) is a Russian football player who plays as a goalkeeper for Yelimay in the Kazakhstan Premier League. He has previously played in the top divisions in Russia, Serbia, Belarus, Kazakhstan and Scotland.

== Career ==
Coming from the Fyodor Cherenkov Academy, Konovalov's first role as a senior was as reserve goalkeeper of Russian Premier League sides Spartak Moscow and Amkar Perm in the seasons 2012–13 and 2013–14, respectively.

He made his professional debut in the Russian Professional Football League for SKChF Sevastopol on 3 September 2014 in a game against Krasnodar-2.

On 23 July 2015, he signed a 2-year contract with Serbian SuperLiga side Radnički Niš.

In January 2017, he signed contract with Serbian SuperLiga side OFK Bačka.

On 29 June 2018, he signed a 4-year contract with the Russian Premier League club Rubin Kazan.

On 18 January 2022, Konovalov signed an initial 18-month deal with Scottish Premiership side Livingston, subject to international clearance and obtaining a work permit. Konovalov was the only Russian player in professional league football in the UK at the time. He initially served as a backup to Max Stryjek, but was given an opportunity to play when Stryjek was suspended for two matches.

On 9 February 2023, Kazakhstan Premier League club Tobol announced the signing of Konovalov. On 10 January 2024, Tobol announced that Konovalov had left the club.

On 30 January 2024, Baltika Kaliningrad announced the signing of Konovalov on a contract until the end of the season. On 4 June 2024, Konovalov left Baltika as his contract expired.

On 25 June 2024, Azerbaijan Premier League club Turan Tovuz announced the signing of Konovalov. On 10 June 2025, Turan Tovuz announced the departure of Konovalov after his contract had expired.

== Career statistics ==
As of match played 28 March 2025

| Club | Season | League | | | National cup (Note: Includes Belarusian Cup, Russian Cup, Kazakhstan Cup) | | League cup (Note: Includes Scottish League Cup) | | Continental | | Other | | Total | |
| Club | Season | Division | Apps | Goals | Apps | Goals | Apps | Goals | Apps | Goals | Apps | Goals | Apps | Goals |
|---|---|---|---|---|---|---|---|---|---|---|---|---|---|---|
| Amkar Perm | 2013–14 | Russian Premier League | 0 | 0 | 0 | 0 | – | | – | | – | | 0 | 0 |
| SKChF Sevastopol | 2014–15 | Russian Second League | 8 | 0 | 0 | 0 | – | | – | | – | | 8 | 0 |
| Astrakhan | 2014–15 | Russian Second League | 13 | 0 | – | | – | | – | | – | | 13 | 0 |
| Radnički Niš | 2015–16 | Serbian SuperLiga | 1 | 0 | 0 | 0 | – | | – | | – | | 1 | 0 |
| Radnički Niš | 2016–17 | Serbian SuperLiga | 5 | 0 | 0 | 0 | – | | – | | – | | 5 | 0 |
| Radnički Niš | Total | | 6 | 0 | 0 | 0 | 0 | 0 | 0 | 0 | 0 | 0 | 6 | 0 |
| OFK Bačka | 2016–17 | Serbian SuperLiga | 11 | 0 | – | | – | | – | | – | | 11 | 0 |
| Torpedo-BelAZ Zhodino | 2017 | Belarusian Premier League | 5 | 0 | 1 | 0 | – | | – | | – | | 6 | 0 |
| Torpedo-BelAZ Zhodino | 2018 | Belarusian Premier League | 7 | 0 | – | | – | | – | | – | | 7 | 0 |
| Torpedo-BelAZ Zhodino | Total | | 12 | 0 | 1 | 0 | 0 | 0 | 0 | 0 | 0 | 0 | 13 | 0 |
| Rubin Kazan | 2018–19 | Russian Premier League | 20 | 0 | 1 | 0 | – | | – | | – | | 21 | 0 |
| Rubin Kazan | 2019–20 | Russian Premier League | 0 | 0 | 1 | 0 | – | | – | | – | | 1 | 0 |
| Rubin Kazan | 2020–21 | Russian Premier League | 0 | 0 | 0 | 0 | – | | – | | – | | 0 | 0 |
| Rubin Kazan | 2021–22 | Russian Premier League | 0 | 0 | 0 | 0 | – | | 0 | 0 | – | | 0 | 0 |
| Rubin Kazan | Total | | 20 | 0 | 2 | 0 | 0 | 0 | 0 | 0 | 0 | 0 | 22 | 0 |
| Ural Yekaterinburg (loan) | 2020–21 | Russian Premier League | 1 | 0 | 1 | 0 | – | | – | | – | | 2 | 0 |
| Ural-2 Yekaterinburg (loan) | 2020–21 | Russian Second League | 1 | 0 | – | | – | | – | | – | | 1 | 0 |
| Livingston | 2021–22 | Scottish Premiership | 3 | 0 | 0 | 0 | 0 | 0 | – | | – | | 3 | 0 |
| Livingston | 2022–23 | Scottish Premiership | 4 | 0 | 0 | 0 | 4 | 0 | – | | – | | 8 | 0 |
| Livingston | Total | | 7 | 0 | 0 | 0 | 4 | 0 | 0 | 0 | 0 | 0 | 11 | 0 |
| Livingston B | 2022–23 | — | | | — | | — | | — | | 2 (Note: Appearances in Scottish Challenge Cup) | 0 | 2 | 0 |
| Tobol | 2023 | Kazakhstan Premier League | 16 | 0 | 4 | 0 | – | | 8 (Note: Appearances in UEFA Europa Conference League) | 0 | – | | 28 | 0 |
| Baltika Kaliningrad | 2023–24 | Russian Premier League | 0 | 0 | 0 | 0 | – | | – | | – | | 0 | 0 |
| Turan Tovuz | 2024–25 | Azerbaijan Premier League | 22 | 0 | 0 | 0 | – | | – | | – | | 22 | 0 |
| Career total | | | 117 | 0 | 8 | 0 | 4 | 0 | 8 | 0 | 2 | 0 | 139 | 0 |
