= Oleg Baklov =

Tajikistani footballer (born 1994)

Personal information
- Full name: Oleg Yuryevich Baklov
- Date of birth: 20 October 1994 (age 32)
- Place of birth: Taboshar, Tajikistan
- Height: 2.01 m (6 ft 7 in)
- Position: Goalkeeper

Team information
- Current team: Turan Tovuz
- Number: 1

Youth career
- –2013: Syzran-2003
- 2013: Krylia Sovetov

Senior career*
Years	Team	Apps	(Gls)
2014–2017	Syzran-2003	63	(0)
2018–2023	Ural Yekaterinburg	3	(0)
2018–2021	→ Ural-2 Yekaterinburg	14	(0)
2021–2022	→ KAMAZ (loan)	16	(0)
2023–2025	Ufa	63	(0)
2025–	Turan Tovuz	23	(0)

International career^{‡}
2024–	Tajikistan	8	(0)
- * Club domestic league appearances and goals as of 23 September 2026 ‡ National team caps and goals as of 14 October 2025

Oleg Yuryevich Baklov (Russian: Олег Юрьевич Баклов; born 20 October 1994) is a Tajikistani football player who plays for Azerbaijan Premier League club Turan Tovuz and the Tajikistan national team.

== Club career ==
He made his professional debut in the Russian Professional Football League for FC Syzran-2003 on 18 July 2014 in a game against FC Rubin-2 Kazan.

He made his debut for the main squad of FC Ural Yekaterinburg on 25 September 2018 in a Russian Cup game against FC Neftekhimik Nizhnekamsk.

He made his Russian Premier League debut for Ural on 14 September 2019, when he started an away game against FC Spartak Moscow, which Ural won 2–1.

On 2 July 2021, he was loaned to FC KAMAZ Naberezhnye Chelny.

Baklov left Ural in June 2023.

== International career ==
On 30 August 2024, Baklov was called up to the Tajikistan squad for the first time, for their matches in the 2024 Merdeka Tournament. Baklov made his debut for Tajikistan on 8 September 2024, in a 0-0 draw against the Philippines in the Third Place playoff match at the 2024 Merdeka Tournament.
