= Rufat Ahmadov =

Azerbaijani footballer (born 2002)

Personal information
- Full name: Rufat Parviz oglu Ahmadov
- Date of birth: 22 September 2002 (age 24)
- Place of birth: Julfa, Azerbaijan
- Height: 1.78 m (5 ft 10 in)
- Position: Defender

Team information
- Current team: Qabala
- Number: 7

Senior career*
Years	Team	Apps	(Gls)
2019–	Qabala	29	(0)
2023–2024	→ Kapaz (loan)	23	(1)
2024–2025	→ Turan Tovuz (loan)	15	(0)

International career^{‡}
2018	Azerbaijan U17	3	(0)
- * Club domestic league appearances and goals as of 29 October 2025 ‡ National team caps and goals as of 22 September 2020

Rufat Ahmadov (Azerbaijani: Rüfət Əhmədov; born on 22 September 2002) is an Azerbaijani professional footballer who plays as a defender for Qabala in the Azerbaijan Premier League.

== Career ==
=== Club ===
On 23 August 2020, Ahmadov made his debut in the Azerbaijan Premier League for Gabala in a match against Zira.

== Career statistics ==
=== Club ===
As of match played 21 July 2022

Appearances and goals by club, season and competition
Club	Season	League			National Cup		Continental		Other		Total	
Club	Season	Division	Apps	Goals	Apps	Goals	Apps	Goals	Apps	Goals	Apps	Goals
Gabala	2020–21	Azerbaijan Premier League	17	0	2	0	-		-		19	0
Gabala	2021–22	Azerbaijan Premier League	8	0	2	0	-		-		10	0
Gabala	2022–23	Azerbaijan Premier League	0	0	0	0	1	0	-		1	0
Gabala	2023–24	Azerbaijan Premier League	0	0	0	0	-		-		0	0
Gabala	2024–25	Azerbaijan First League	0	0	0	0	-		-		0	0
Gabala	2025–26	Azerbaijan Premier League	4	0	0	0	-		-		4	0
Gabala	Total		29	0	4	0	1	0	-	-	34	0
Kapaz (loan)	2023–24	Azerbaijan Premier League	23	1	0	0	-		-		23	1
Turan Tovuz (loan)	2024–25	Azerbaijan Premier League	15	0	1	0	-		-		16	0
Career total			67	1	5	0	1	0	-	-	73	1
