= Farid Yusifli =

Azerbaijani footballer (born 2002)

Personal information
- Full name: Farid Yalchin oglu Yusifli
- Date of birth: 20 February 2002 (age 24)
- Place of birth: Azerbaijan
- Height: 1.78 m (5 ft 10 in)
- Position: Midfielder

Team information
- Current team: Turan Tovuz
- Number: 13

Senior career*
Years	Team	Apps	(Gls)
2020–2024	Neftçi Baku	28	(0)
2024	→ Turan Tovuz (loan)	10	(0)
2024–	Turan Tovuz	30	(0)

International career^{‡}
2018	Azerbaijan U17	2	(0)
2026–	Azerbaijan	1	(0)
- * Club domestic league appearances and goals as of 22 June 2026 ‡ National team caps and goals as of 23 September 2026

Farid Yusifli (Azerbaijani: Fərid Yusifli; born 20 February 2002) is an Azerbaijani footballer who plays as a midfielder for Azerbaijan Premier League club Turan Tovuz and the Azerbaijan national team.

== Club career ==
On 20 August 2020, Yusifli made his debut in the Azerbaijan Premier League for Neftçi Baku in a 1–2 loss against Qarabağ.
