= Aykhan Guseynov =

Azerbaijani footballer

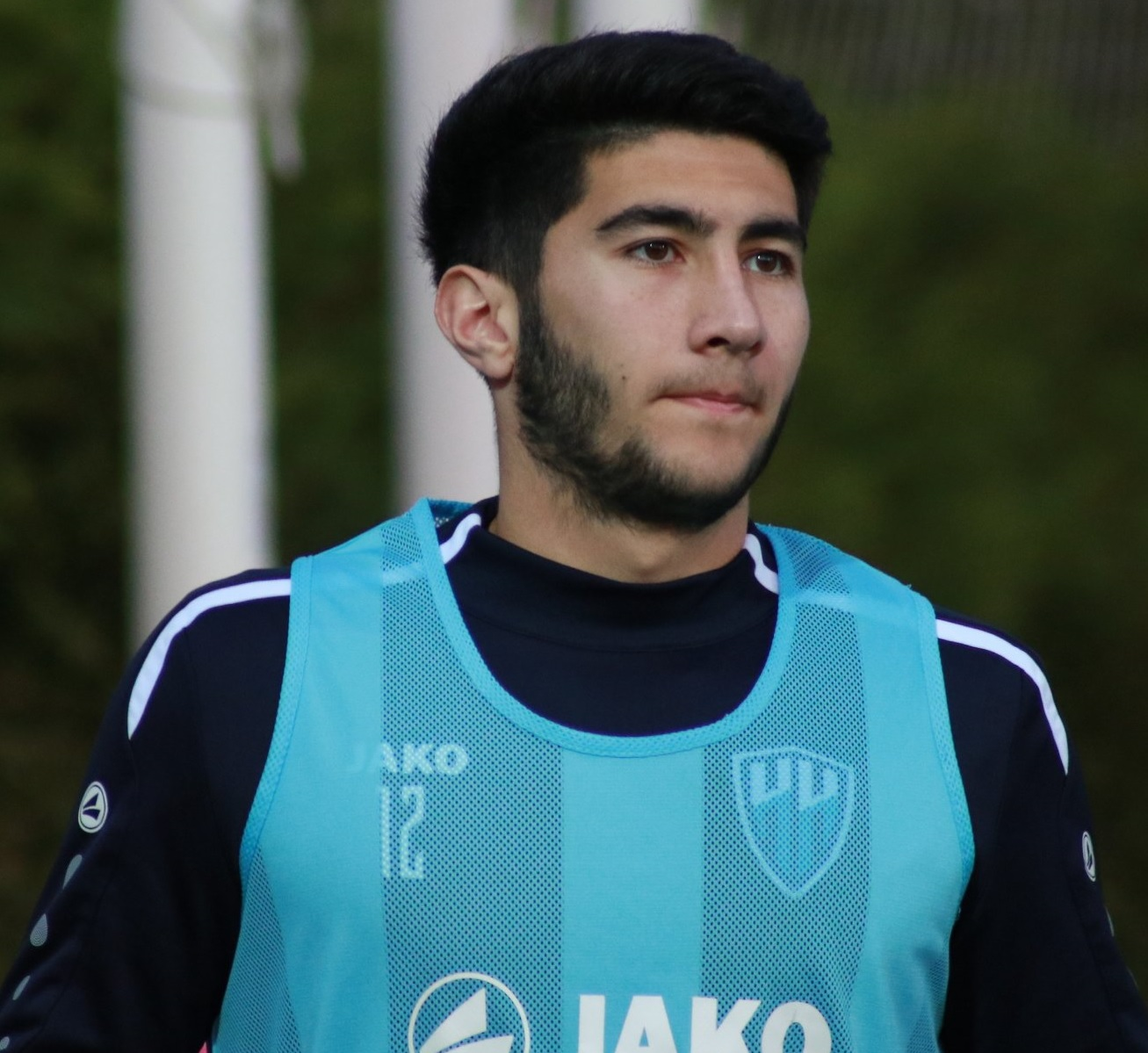
- Guseynov with Nizhny Novgorod in 2019

Personal information
- Full name: Aykhan Ilkhamovich Guseynov
- Date of birth: 3 September 1999 (age 27)
- Place of birth: Oyskhara, Russia
- Height: 1.78 m (5 ft 10 in)
- Position: Midfielder

Team information
- Current team: Zira
- Number: 22

Youth career
- FC Zenit Saint Petersburg

Senior career*
Years	Team	Apps	(Gls)
2019	FC Leningradets Leningrad Oblast	7	(1)
2019	FC Nizhny Novgorod	1	(0)
2020	FC Ural Yekaterinburg	0	(0)
2020	→ FC Ural-2 Yekaterinburg	8	(1)
2021	FC Olimp-Dolgoprudny	11	(1)
2021–2022	FC Khimki	0	(0)
2021–2022	→ FC Khimki-M	27	(8)
2022–2026	Turan Tovuz	128	(18)
2026–	Zira	0	(0)

International career^{‡}
2026–	Azerbaijan	4	(0)
- * Club domestic league appearances and goals as of 08 July 2026 ‡ National team caps and goals as of 27 March 2026

Aykhan Ilkhamovich Guseynov (Azerbaijani: Ayxan İlham oğlu Hüseynov; Russian: Айхан Илхамович Гусейнов; born 3 September 1999) is a professional footballer who plays for Zira. Born in Russia, he represents the Azerbaijan national team.

== Club career ==
He made his debut in the Russian Professional Football League for FC Leningradets Leningrad Oblast on 6 April 2019 in a game against FC Znamya Truda Orekhovo-Zuyevo.

He made his Russian Football National League debut for FC Nizhny Novgorod on 14 September 2019 in a game against FC Luch Vladivostok.

On 23 June 2026, Guseynov signed a two-year contract with Azerbaijan Premier League club Zira FK.
