= Şehriyar Aliyev =

Azerbaijani footballer (born 1992)

Personal information
- Full name: Şehriyar Abış oglu Aliyev
- Date of birth: 25 December 1992 (age 33)
- Place of birth: Baku, Azerbaijan
- Height: 1.81 m (5 ft 11 in)
- Position: Centre-back

Team information
- Current team: Turan Tovuz
- Number: 4

Senior career*
Years	Team	Apps	(Gls)
2011–2014	Baku	54	(0)
2014–2016	Qarabağ	3	(0)
2015–2016	→ Kapaz (loan)	33	(0)
2016–2018	Kapaz	43	(2)
2018–2020	Sumgayit	34	(3)
2020–2022	Keşla	45	(2)
2022–	Turan Tovuz	77	(4)

International career^{‡}
2013–2014	Azerbaijan U21	5	(0)
2020–	Azerbaijan	2	(0)
- * Club domestic league appearances and goals as of 12 June 2026 ‡ National team caps and goals as of 4 May 2023

Şehriyar Abış oglu Aliyev (Azerbaijani: Şəhriyar Abış oğlu Əliyev; born 25 December 1992) is an Azerbaijani professional footballer who plays as a defender for Turan Tovuz in the Azerbaijan Premier League.

== Career ==
On 20 November 2011, Aliyev made his debut in the Azerbaijan Premier League for Baku, in a 5–0 victory against Turan-Tovuz.

On 24 June 2020, Aliyev signed a one-year contract with Keşla FK.

== Honours ==
Qarabağ

- Azerbaijan Premier League (1): 2014–15
- Azerbaijan Cup (1): 2014–15

Baku

- Azerbaijan Cup (1): 2011–12
