= Tovuz City Stadium =

Stadium in Tovuz, Azerbaijan

Coordinates: 40°59′32″N 45°37′32″E

Tovuz Town Stadium
- Interactive map of Tovuz Town Stadium
- Full name: Tovuz Town Stadium
- Location: Tovuz, Azerbaijan
- Owner: Turan Tovuz
- Capacity: 6,800
- Surface: grass
- Field size: 105 x 68 m

Construction
- Built: 1979

Tenant
- Turan Tovuz

Tovuz City Stadium is a multi-purpose stadium in Tovuz, Azerbaijan. It is currently used mostly for football matches and is the home stadium of Turan Tovuz. The stadium holds 6,800 people.
