= Sergei Samok =

Russian footballer

Personal information
- Full name: Sergei Viktorovich Samok
- Date of birth: 15 February 2001 (age 25)
- Place of birth: Talmenka, Talmensky District, Altai Krai, Russia
- Height: 1.90 m (6 ft 3 in)
- Position: Goalkeeper

Team information
- Current team: Veles Moscow
- Number: 41

Youth career
- 2007–2015: DYuSSh Yunost Talmenka
- 2016–2017: Tom Tomsk
- 2018–2019: CSKA Moscow
- 2019–2021: Sochi

Senior career*
| Years | Team | Apps | (Gls) |
| 2021–2022 | Sochi | 0 | (0) |
| 2021–2022 | → SKA-Khabarovsk (loan) | 7 | (0) |
| 2021–2022 | → SKA-Khabarovsk-2 (loan) | 4 | (0) |
| 2022 | Novosibirsk | 5 | (0) |
| 2023 | Rotor Volgograd | 15 | (0) |
| 2024 | KAMAZ Naberezhnye Chelny | 9 | (0) |
| 2024–2026 | Turan Tovuz | 25 | (0) |
| 2026– | Veles Moscow | 0 | (0) |
- * Club domestic league appearances and goals as of 21 June 2026

Sergei Viktorovich Samok (Russian: Сергей Викторович Самок; born 15 February 2001) is a Russian football player who plays for Veles Moscow.

== Club career ==
He made his debut in the Russian Football National League for SKA-Khabarovsk on 13 October 2021 in a game against Fakel Voronezh.

On 20 June 2024, he joined the Azerbaijani club "Turan Tovuz". On 29 September 2024, he made his debut in the Azerbaijan Premier League in a match against the club "Shamakhi". On 21 June 2026, his contract was not extended, and the club parted ways with him.
