= Veysal Rzayev =

Azerbaijani footballer (born 2002)

Personal information
- Date of birth: 24 October 2002 (age 24)
- Place of birth: Masazir, Azerbaijan
- Height: 1.79 m (5 ft 10 in)
- Position: Midfielder

Team information
- Current team: Kapaz
- Number: 8

Youth career
- Gabala

Senior career*
Years	Team	Apps	(Gls)
2020–2024	Sabah	16	(0)
2022–2024	→ Turan Tovuz (loan)	41	(0)
2024–2025	Turan Tovuz	26	(2)
2026–	Kapaz	2	(0)

International career^{‡}
2017–2018	Azerbaijan U17	4	(0)
2019–2020	Azerbaijan U19	3	(0)
2020–2023	Azerbaijan U21	12	(0)
Medal record
Men's football
Representing Azerbaijan
Islamic Solidarity Games
Bronze medal – third place	2021 Konya
- * Club domestic league appearances and goals as of 22 June 2026 ‡ National team caps and goals as of 21 November 2023

Veysal Rzayev (Azerbaijani: Veysəl Rzayev; born on 24 October 2002) is an Azerbaijani professional footballer who plays as a midfielder for Kapaz PFK.

== Career ==
=== Club ===
On 2 October 2020, Rzayev made his debut in the Azerbaijan Premier League for Sabah in a match against Keşla.

On 5 April 2025, in the 29th round of the Azerbaijan Premier League, during the match between Turan Tovuz and Sabail, Veysel Rzayev attempted to hit a Səbail fan. For this action, the AFFA Disciplinary Committee fined "Turan" 2000 manat and imposed a two-match suspension on Rzayev, with one of the matches being conditional.

On 29 December 2025, Rzayev's contract with Turan Tovuz was mutually terminated.

On 7 January 2026, Kapaz PFK announced that it had signed Rzayev to a contract until the end of the season.
