= Emmanuel Hackman =

Togolese footballer

Personal information
- Date of birth: 14 May 1995 (age 31)
- Place of birth: Accra, Ghana
- Height: 1.87 m (6 ft 2 in)
- Position: Defender

Team information
- Current team: Turan Tovuz
- Number: 15

Senior career*
Years	Team	Apps	(Gls)
2013–2014	Liberty Professionals		
2014–2015	Vila Real	11	(0)
2015–2017	Boavista	12	(0)
2016–2017	→ Aves (loan)	24	(2)
2017–2021	Portimonense	62	(1)
2021–2023	Gil Vicente	24	(0)
2023	Mladost Novi Sad	15	(0)
2023–	Turan Tovuz	90	(4)

International career^{‡}
2022–	Togo	5	(0)
- * Club domestic league appearances and goals as of 22 June 2026 ‡ National team caps and goals as of 9 May 2023

Emmanuel Hackman (born 14 May 1995) is a professional footballer who plays for Azerbaijan Premier League club Turan Tovuz. Born in Ghana, he plays for the Togo national team.

== Club career ==
Hackman made his professional debut in the Primeira Liga for Boavista on 6 December 2015, coming on as a second-half substitute for Anderson Correia in a 2–3 loss to Arouca.

On 1 July 2021, Hackman signed a three-year contract with Gil Vicente.

On 14 September 2023, Turan Tovuz announced the signing of Hackman.

== International career ==
Hackman was born in Ghana to a Ghanaian Ewe father and Togolese mother. He was called up to the Togo national team for a set of friendlies in March 2022. He debuted for Togo in a 3–0 friendly win over Sierra Leone on 24 March 2022.
