= Haiderson Hurtado =

Colombian footballer (born 1995)

Personal information
- Full name: Haiderson Hurtado Palomino
- Date of birth: 25 November 1995 (age 30)
- Place of birth: Colombia
- Height: 1.85 m (6 ft 1 in)
- Position: Centre-back

Team information
- Current team: Turan Tovuz
- Number: 32

Senior career*
Years	Team	Apps	(Gls)
–2018	Genus Porto Velho	6	(0)
2018–2019	Itararé	5	(0)
2019	Cascavel	1	(0)
2020	PSTC	10	(0)
2020–2021	Paraná Clube	23	(1)
2021–2022	Sereď	12	(0)
2022	Azuriz	3	(0)
2022–2023	MFK Skalica	16	(2)
2023–2025	Jablonec	36	(0)
2025–	Turan Tovuz	46	(5)
- * Club domestic league appearances and goals as of 22 June 2026

Haiderson Hurtado Palomino (born 25 November 1995) is a Colombian footballer who plays as a centre-back for Azerbaijani club Turan Tovuz.

== Club career ==
=== ŠKF Sereď ===
Haiderson Hurtado made his Fortuna Liga debut for Sereď against Žilina on 25 July 2021.

=== Turan Tovuz ===
On 8 February 2024, Hurtado signed a contract with Azerbaijani club Turan Tovuz.
