= Diogo Verdasca =

Portuguese footballer

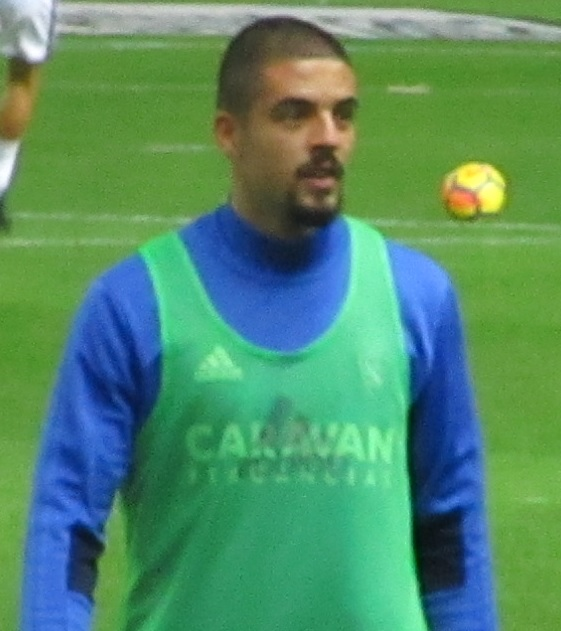
- Verdasca with Zaragoza in 2017

Personal information
- Full name: Diogo Sousa Verdasca
- Date of birth: 26 October 1996 (age 30)
- Place of birth: Guimarães, Portugal
- Height: 1.85 m (6 ft 1 in)
- Position: Centre-back

Team information
- Current team: Kapaz
- Number: 29

Youth career
- 2004–2005: Avintes
- 2005–2006: Oliveira Douro
- 2006–2010: Porto
- 2010–2012: Boavista
- 2012–2015: Porto

Senior career*
Years	Team	Apps	(Gls)
2015–2017	Porto B	51	(2)
2017–2019	Zaragoza	60	(3)
2019–2021	Beitar Jerusalem	33	(0)
2021–2023	Śląsk Wrocław	43	(1)
2023–2024	Mirandés	2	(0)
2024–	Kapaz	55	(1)

International career
2012	Portugal U16	6	(0)
2012	Portugal U17	9	(0)
2013–2014	Portugal U18	7	(0)
2015	Portugal U19	2	(0)
2016	Portugal U20	6	(1)
- * Club domestic league appearances and goals as of 22 June 2026

Diogo Sousa Verdasca (born 26 October 1996) is a Portuguese professional footballer who plays as a central defender for Azerbaijan Premier League club Kapaz.

== Club career ==
=== Porto ===
Born in Guimarães, Minho Province, Verdasca played youth football for four clubs, including FC Porto in two different spells. On 9 August 2015 he made his senior debut, playing 81 minutes for the reserves in a 1–2 home loss to Portimonense S.C. in the Segunda Liga. He scored twice during his first season, against C.D. Feirense (2–0 home win) and S.L. Benfica B (3–1, also at home), as they won the championship but were ineligible for promotion.

In February 2016, the 19-year-old Verdasca was called to the first team for the first time, for a UEFA Europa League match at Borussia Dortmund, but remained an unused substitute in the 2–0 away loss.

=== Zaragoza ===
On 17 July 2017, Verdasca signed a three-year contract with Spanish Segunda División side Real Zaragoza. He was sent off on 9 December in the first half-hour of a 3–0 home defeat against Cádiz CF, for insulting the referee after receiving a yellow card.

Verdasca scored his first goal for them on 8 September 2018, in a 4–0 away rout of Real Oviedo.

=== Beitar Jerusalem ===
Verdasca switched countries again on 21 August 2019, joining Beitar Jerusalem F.C. of the Israeli Premier League on a two-year deal with the option of a third. Just over a month after signing, his team won the Toto Cup with a 2–1 victory over Maccabi Haifa FC.

Verdasca was released in March 2021 for reasons within his contract that could not be made public. In an interview with Portuguese media, he said that the club from the Holy Land had unravelled following the removal of Yossi Benayoun as sporting director.

=== Śląsk Wrocław ===
On 19 June 2021, Verdasca moved to the Polish Ekstraklasa with Śląsk Wrocław. He scored once from 46 games, in a 5–0 away win over Wisła Kraków on 23 October that year.

Verdasca left in July 2023.

=== Mirandés ===
On 27 July 2023, Verdasca returned to Spain and its second division, after agreeing to a one-year contract at CD Mirandés. He ruptured the Achilles tendon of his left leg in his first training, being sidelined for the vast majority of his only season.

=== Later career ===
On 18 September 2024, Azerbaijan Premier League side Kapaz PFK signed Verdasca on a one-year deal.

== Honours ==
Porto B

- LigaPro: 2015–16

Beitar Jerusalem

- Israeli Toto Cup: 2019–20
