= Roderick Miller (footballer) =

Panamanian football player (born 1992)

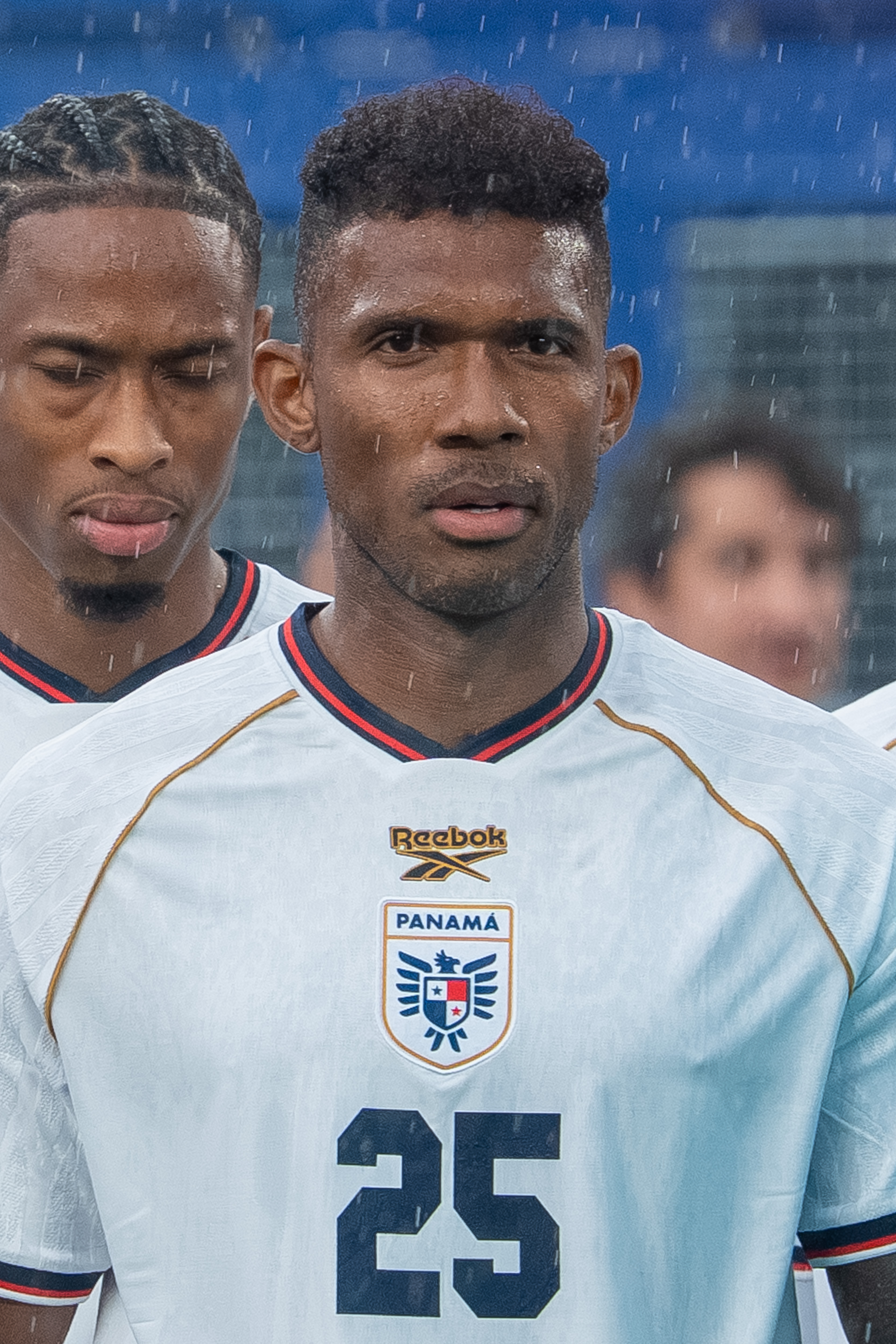
- Miller with Panama in 2026

Personal information
- Full name: Roderick Alonso Miller Molina
- Date of birth: 3 April 1992 (age 34)
- Place of birth: Panama City, Panama
- Height: 1.90 m (6 ft 3 in)
- Position: Centre-back

Team information
- Current team: Turan Tovuz
- Number: 5

Youth career
- San Francisco

Senior career*
Years	Team	Apps	(Gls)
2010–2014	San Francisco	94	(4)
2014	→ Venados (loan)	6	(0)
2015	San Francisco	4	(0)
2016–2018	Atlético Nacional	13	(0)
2018	C.D. Feirense	1	(0)
2019	Okzhetpes	4	(0)
2020	Carlos Stein	4	(1)
2021	San Francisco	18	(0)
2021–2022	Al-Quwa Al-Jawiya	5	(1)
2022	Al-Minaa	0	(0)
2023–	Turan Tovuz	73	(10)

International career^{‡}
2011	Panama U20	2	(0)
2011–2012	Panama U23	7	(0)
2011–	Panama	49	(2)
Medal record
Men's football
Representing Panama
CONCACAF Gold Cup
Runner-up	2023 United States–Canada	Team
- * Club domestic league appearances and goals as of 15 May 2026 ‡ National team caps and goals as of 3 June 2026

Roderick Alonso Miller Molina (born 3 April 1992) is a Panamanian professional footballer who plays as a centre-back for Azerbaijan Premier League club Turan Tovuz and the Panama national team.

== Club career ==
In 2014, Miller had a spell in Mexican football with Mérida.

On 21 January 2019, FC Okzhetpes announced the signing of Miller on a one-year contract. Miller left Okzhetpes by mutual consent on 25 July 2019.

In September 2021, Miller made a surprise move to Iraq for Al-Quwa Al-Jawiya.

On 22 March 2023, Turan Tovuz announced the signing of Miller to a three-month contract, with the option of an additional year.

== International career ==
Miller was part of the Panama U-20 squad that played at the 2011 FIFA U-20 World Cup in Colombia.

He made his senior debut for Panama in an October 2011 FIFA World Cup qualification match against Dominica and has, as of 10 June 2015, earned a total of 10 caps, scoring no goals including a 2012 unofficial match against Guyana. He represented his country at the 2013 CONCACAF Gold Cup.

== Career statistics ==
=== International ===
As of match played 3 June 2026

Appearances and goals by national team and year
National team	Year	Apps	Goals
Panama	2011	3	0
Panama	2012	3	0
Panama	2013	4	0
Panama	2015	1	0
Panama	2016	12	0
Panama	2017	4	1
Panama	2021	3	0
Panama	2022	4	0
Panama	2023	5	1
Panama	2024	7	0
Panama	2026	4	0
Total		49	2

Scores and results list Panama's goal tally first, score column indicates score after each Miller goal.

List of international goals scored by Roderick Miller
No.	Date	Venue	Opponent	Score	Result	Competition
1	15 January 2017	Estadio Rommel Fernández, Panama City, Panama	Nicaragua	1–0	2–1	2017 Copa Centroamericana
2	15 November 2023	Estadio Universitario, Penonomé, Panama	Nicaragua	3–2	3–2	Friendly

== Honours ==
San Francisco

- Liga Panameña: 2011-C

Atlético Nacional

- Categoría Primera A: 2015-Finalización
- Copa Libertadores: 2016
- Recopa Sudamericana: 2017

Panama

- CONCACAF Gold Cup runner-up: 2013, 2023
