= Jô (footballer, born 1995) =

Brazilian footballer

Personal information
- Full name: Joarlem Batista Santos
- Date of birth: 1 May 1995 (age 31)
- Place of birth: Teófilo Otoni, Brazil
- Height: 1.92 m (6 ft 3 1/2 in)
- Position: Forward

Team information
- Current team: Turan Tovuz
- Number: 90

Senior career*
| Years | Team | Apps | (Gls) |
| 2013 | União São João | 10 | (0) |
| 2014–2015 | Mogi Mirim | 3 | (0) |
| 2015 | Marília | 0 | (0) |
| 2015–2016 | Mogi Mirim | 15 | (1) |
| 2017 | Capivariano | 8 | (1) |
| 2017 | Taubaté | 0 | (0) |
| 2018 | Francana | 3 | (1) |
| 2018 | Comercial-MS | | |
| 2018–2020 | Linense | 0 | (0) |
| 2018–2019 | → Mito HollyHock (loan) | 28 | (1) |
| 2020 | Juventus Jaraguá | 5 | (1) |
| 2020 | Angra dos Reis | 8 | (0) |
| 2021 | Juventus Jaraguá | 8 | (2) |
| 2021–2022 | Sporting Covilhã | 19 | (6) |
| 2022–2025 | Chaves | 62 | (4) |
| 2025– | Turan Tovuz | 37 | (11) |
- * Club domestic league appearances and goals as of 22 June 2026

Joarlem Batista Santos, known as Jô (born 1 May 1995) is a Brazilian professional footballer who plays as a forward for Turan Tovuz in the Azerbaijan Premier League.

== Club statistics (Japan only) ==
Updated to end of 2018 season.

| Club performance | | | League | | Cup | | League Cup | | Total | |
| Season | Club | League | Apps | Goals | Apps | Goals | Apps | Goals | Apps | Goals |
| Japan | | | League | | Emperor's Cup | | J.League Cup | | Total | |
|---|---|---|---|---|---|---|---|---|---|---|
| 2018 | Mito HollyHock | J2 League | 12 | 1 | 0 | 0 | - | | 12 | 1 |
| 2019 | Mito HollyHock | J2 League | 0 | 0 | 0 | 0 | - | | 0 | 0 |
| Total | | | 12 | 1 | 0 | 0 | 0 | 0 | 12 | 1 |
