= Faiq Hacıyev =

Azerbaijani footballer (born 1999)

Personal information
- Full name: Faiq Fərman oğlu Hacıyev
- Date of birth: 22 May 1999 (age 27)
- Place of birth: Qax, Azerbaijan
- Height: 1.79 m (5 ft 10 in)
- Position: Defender

Team information
- Current team: Turan-Tovuz
- Number: 88

Youth career
- Gabala

Senior career*
| Years | Team | Apps | (Gls) |
| 2018–2021 | Gabala | 6 | (0) |
| 2019 | → MOIK Baku (loan) | | |
| 2021– | Turan-Tovuz | 102 | (3) |
- * Club domestic league appearances and goals as of 22 June 2026

Faiq Fərman oğlu Hacıyev (born on 22 May 1999) is an Azerbaijani professional footballer who plays as a defender for Turan-Tovuz in the Azerbaijan Premier League.

== Career ==
=== Club ===
On 21 September 2019, Hacıyev made his debut in the Azerbaijan Premier League for Gabala match against Sabail.

Hacıyev was released by Gabala on 11 June 2021.
