= Arsen Agjabayov =

Azerbaijani footballer (born 2000)

Personal information
- Full name: Arsen Ilham oglu Agjabayov
- Date of birth: 11 September 2000 (age 26)
- Place of birth: Qusar, Azerbaijan
- Height: 1.85 m (6 ft 1 in)
- Position: Defender

Team information
- Current team: Şamaxı
- Number: 5

Youth career
- Gabala

Senior career*
Years	Team	Apps	(Gls)
2019–2021	Sabah U19	1	(0)
2020	→ Sabail (loan)	1	(0)
2021–2022	Sabah	2	(0)
2022	→ Sumgayit (loan)	0	(0)
2022–2023	Shamakhi	13	(0)
2023–2024	Iravan		
2024–	Şamaxı	64	(3)

International career^{‡}
2020–2021	Azerbaijan U21	7	(0)
- * Club domestic league appearances and goals as of 22 June 2026 ‡ National team caps and goals as of 12 November 2021

Arsen Agjabayov (Azerbaijani: Arsen Ağcabəyov; born 11 September 2000) is an Azerbaijani footballer who plays as a defender for Şamaxı in the Azerbaijan Premier League.

== Club career ==
On 15 February 2020, Agjabayov made his debut in the Azerbaijan Premier League for Sabah in a 2–1 victory against Sumgayit.
