= Álex Serrano (footballer) =

Spanish footballer (born 1995)

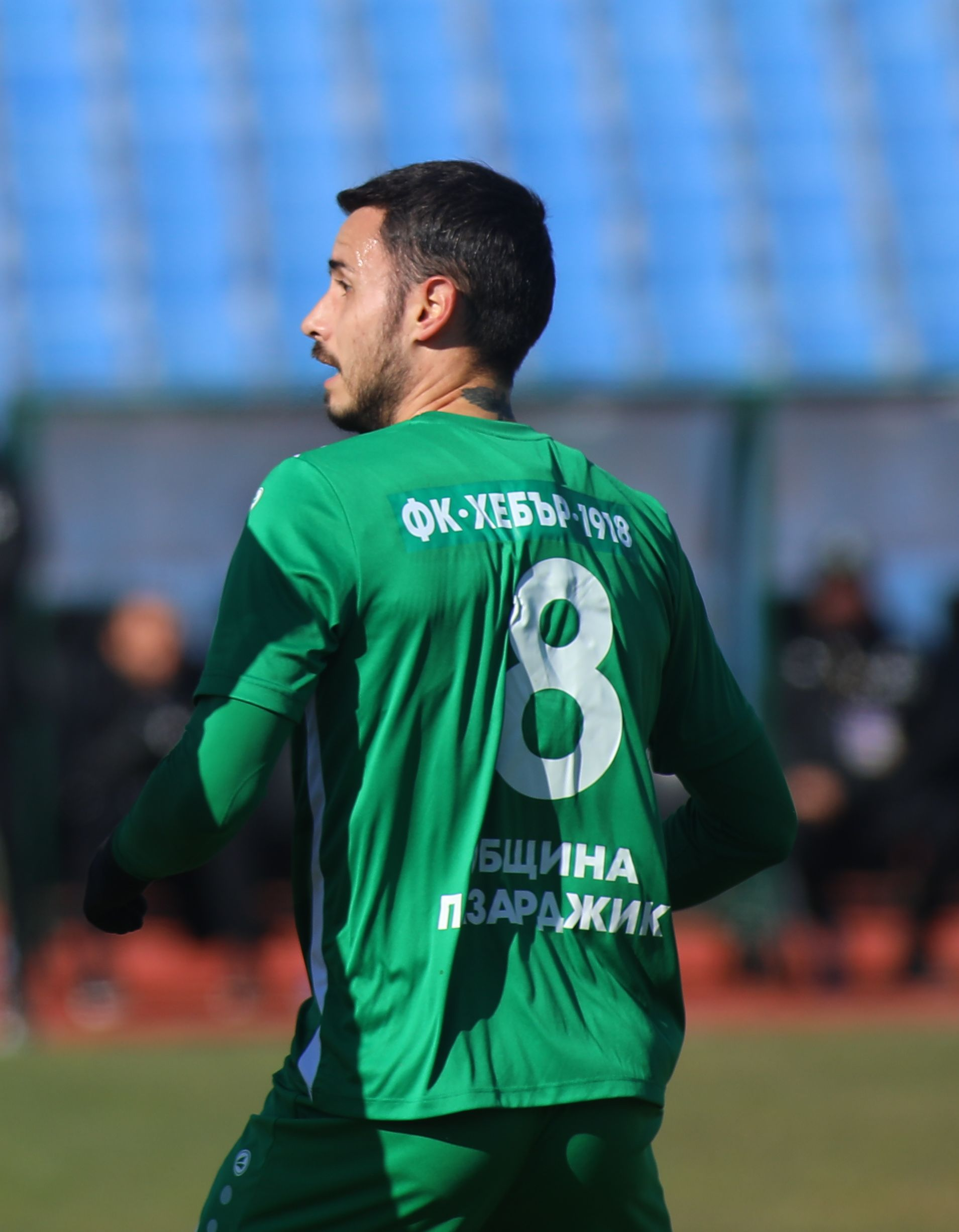

Personal information
- Full name: Alejandro Serrano García
- Date of birth: 6 February 1995 (age 31)
- Place of birth: Barcelona, Spain
- Height: 1.84 m (6 ft 0 in)
- Position: Midfielder

Team information
- Current team: Turan Tovuz
- Number: 23

Youth career
- Dominicas
- Quinta San Eutiquio
- Roces
- 2007–2011: Sporting Gijón

Senior career*
Years	Team	Apps	(Gls)
2011–2013	Sporting Gijón B	74	(4)
2013–2015	Sporting Gijón	4	(0)
2015–2016	Espanyol B	31	(2)
2016–2017	Mallorca B	31	(3)
2017–2018	Mallorca	5	(1)
2018–2019	Celta B	45	(5)
2019–2020	Salamanca	10	(1)
2020–2021	Talavera	6	(0)
2021	Cornellà	15	(0)
2021–2022	Górnik Łęczna	33	(0)
2022–2023	Hebar	22	(1)
2023–	Turan Tovuz	101	(12)

International career
2011	Spain U16	1	(0)
2011–2012	Spain U17	8	(2)
2013	Spain U18	2	(0)
2013–2014	Spain U19	7	(1)
- * Club domestic league appearances and goals as of 22 June 2026

Alejandro "Álex" Serrano García (born 6 February 1995) is a Spanish professional footballer who plays as a central or attacking midfielder for Azerbaijan Premier League club Turan Tovuz.

== Club career ==
Born in Barcelona, Catalonia, Serrano finished his development with Sporting de Gijón's cantera. He made his senior debut at only 15 with the reserves in the 2010–11 season, in Segunda División B.

In August 2013, Serrano was promoted to the main squad which competed in the Segunda División. He played his first game as a professional on 12 January 2014, starting in a 0–0 away draw against CD Tenerife.

Serrano signed with RCD Espanyol on 22 June 2015, being assigned to the B side also in the third division. On 8 July of the following year he moved to another reserve team, RCD Mallorca B of the same league.

On 30 January 2018, after six competitive appearances with Mallorca's first team, Serrano joined Celta de Vigo B. He went on to represent, in quick succession and still in the third tier, Salamanca CF UDS, CF Talavera de la Reina and UE Cornellà.

Serrano made his debut in top-flight football in the 2021–22 campaign, signing with GKS Górnik Łęczna of the Polish Ekstraklasa. His first match in the competition took place on 13 September 2021, when he came on as a late substitute for Damian Gąska in the 3–2 home win over Wisła Płock.

On 1 September 2022, Serrano left the club by mutual consent. Later that month, he joined FC Hebar Pazardzhik of the First Professional Football League (Bulgaria). He switched teams and countries again in summer 2023, on a one-year contract at Turan Tovuz in the Azerbaijan Premier League.

== Personal life ==
Serrano's father, Bernardino, was also a footballer. He too represented Sporting Gijón, and also played for Real Madrid.
