= Tovuz, Azerbaijan =

Place in Tovuz District, Azerbaijan

Tovuz
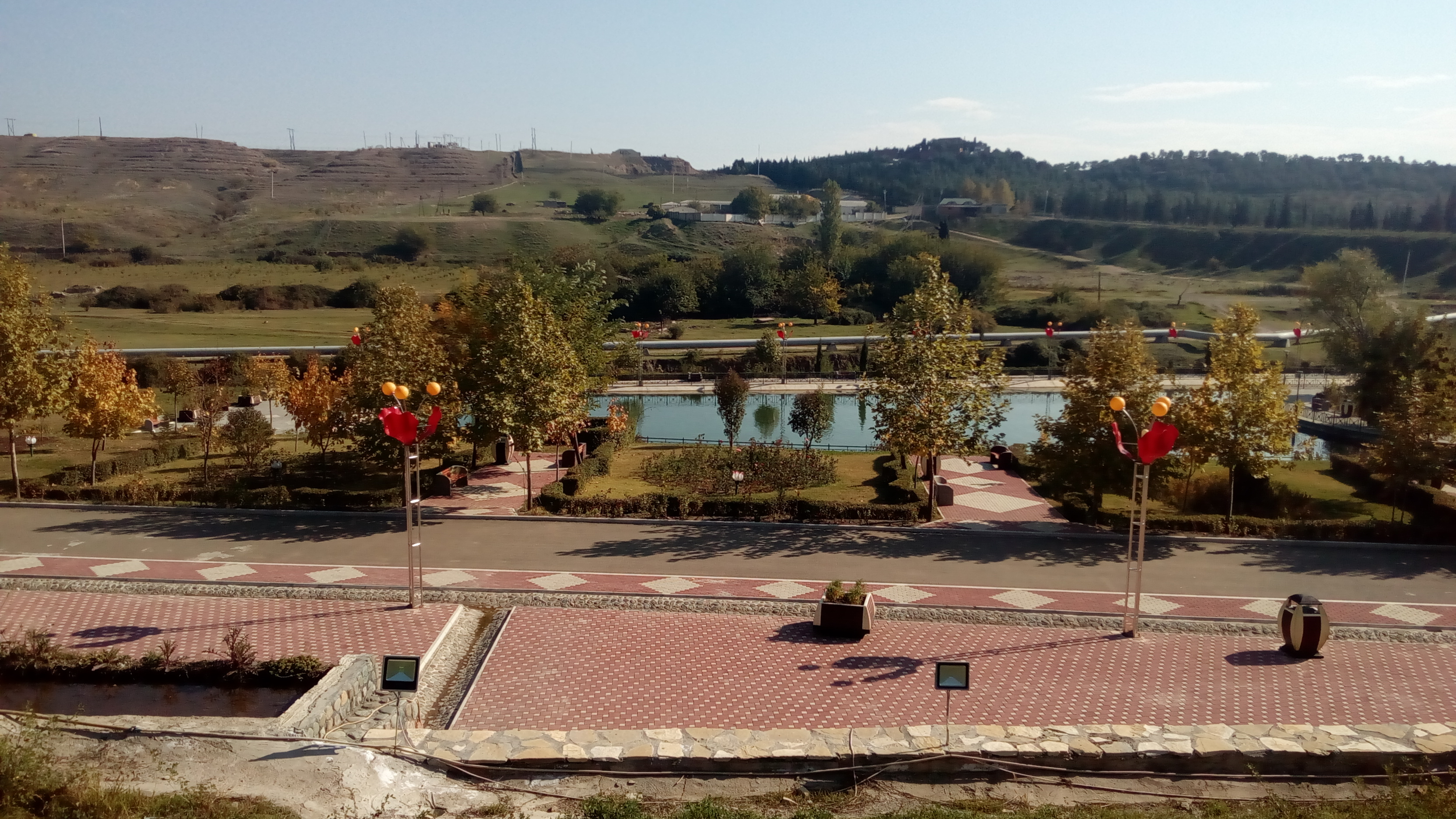
- Tovuz, Heydar Aliyev Park

- Location within Azerbaijan
- Coordinates: 40°59′32″N 45°37′44″E
- Country: Azerbaijan
- District: Tovuz
- Elevation: 422 m (1,385 ft)

Population (2020)
  - Total: 12,626
- Time zone: UTC+4 (AZT)
- Area code: +994 231

Tovuz is the largest city and capital of the Tovuz District of Azerbaijan. The population of the city in 2020 was 12,626.

== Economy ==
The economy of Tovuz is partially agricultural, partially tourist-based, with some industries in operation. One of its main attractions is the State Museum.

=== Winemaking ===
The history of wine production in Tovuz seems to have begun before the 7th century and according to the archaeological findings, which included vessels for wine storage and remains of tartaric acid, proves that the winemaking was apparent in the Tovuz and Ganja region during early stages of social development.

The winemaking industry was boosted in the city after German settlement. Led by Christopher Froer and Christian Gummel, many vineyards were established. Furthermore, Tovuz became famous for producing brandy, under the name cognac, which supplied the entire Russian market.

In addition to German influence in the Caucasus, Russia also played a significant role in the development of winemaking, especially in the Tovuz region in the 19th century. Russian influence was also formative in the development and production of aromatic wines.

== Climate ==
There are three climatic zones in the region:

1. Dry subtropical climate. This climatic area covers the Kura River valley. It is characterized by mild winters and hot summers.
2. Moderate hot dry climate. This climate covers the plain part of the region and the areas with an elevation of up to 1,000 m (3,300 ft). Winters are mild and summers are slightly hot.
3. Mild cold, forest climate. This climatic zone covers the mountainous part with an elevation of 1,000 to 2,000 m (3,300 to 6,600 ft). Summer is cool and winter is slightly frosty. The climate of Tovuz region is influenced by air masses from the South Caucasus (Transcaucasia) plateau, the Atlantic Ocean, the Arctic, and Central Asia.

== Sports ==
The city has one professional football team competing in the top-flight of Azerbaijani football - Turan Tovuz, currently playing in the Azerbaijan Premier League.

== Archaeology ==
The ancient village of Goytepe (Göy Tepe) is one of the largest archaeological monuments in the Ganja–Gazakh region. It is located to the right of the Kura river, 10 km (6.2 mi) east of Tovuz. The site extends over 2 hectares (4.9 acres), at a maximum elevation of around 420 m (1,380 ft).

Starting in 2008, “Tovuz Archaeological Expedition” has been conducting new archaeological investigations at Goytepe, and also at the Mentesh Tepe ancient settlement nearby. This is a joint investigation of archaeologists from Azerbaijan, Japan, and France.

In this same area of Azerbaijan are also located the ancient sites of Shomu Tepe, Soyuq Bulaq, and Boyuk Kesik. Shulaveris Gora is just across the border in Georgia.

== Sister cities ==
- Cognac, France (since 2015)

== Gallery ==
State Museum

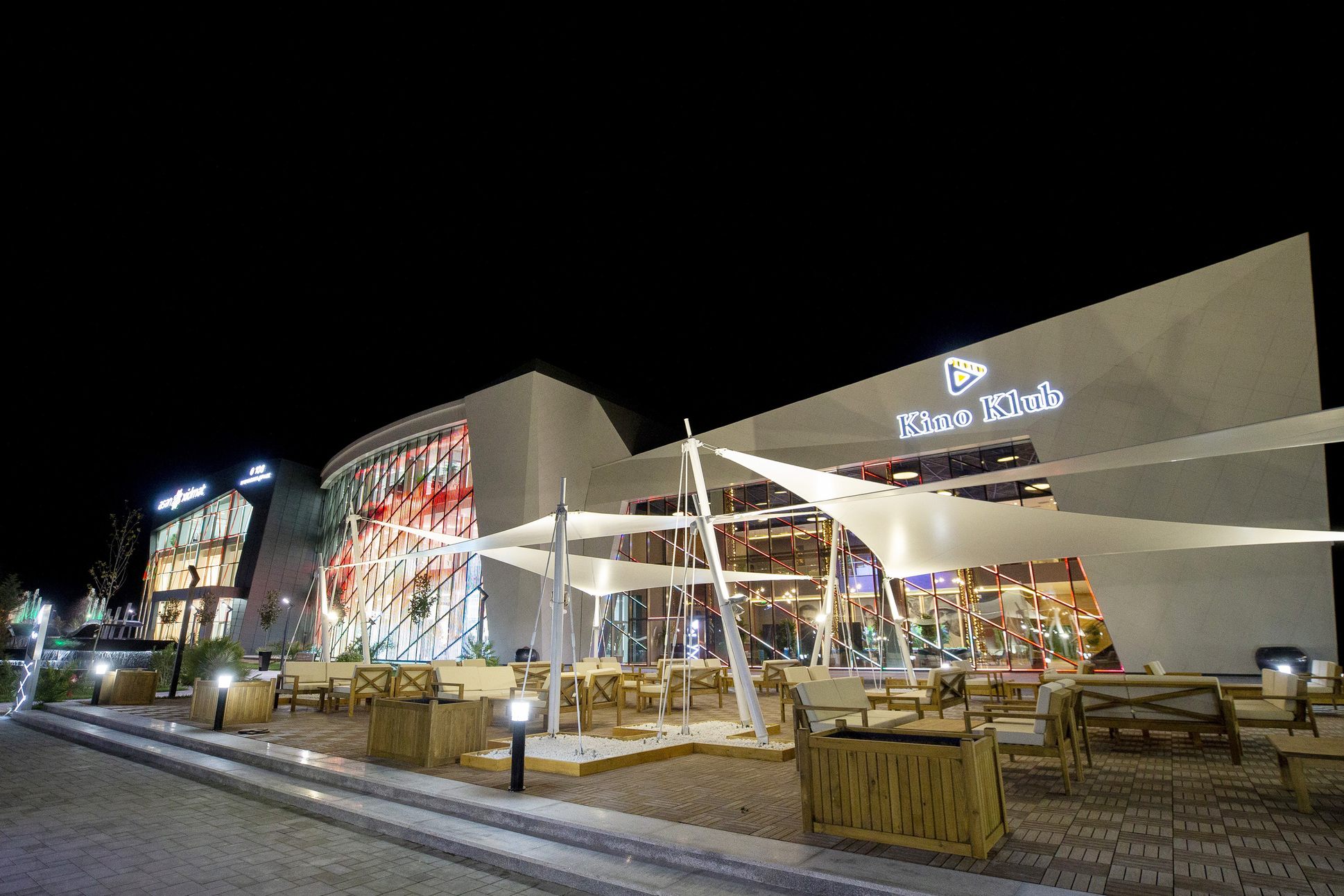
ASAN service in Tovuz

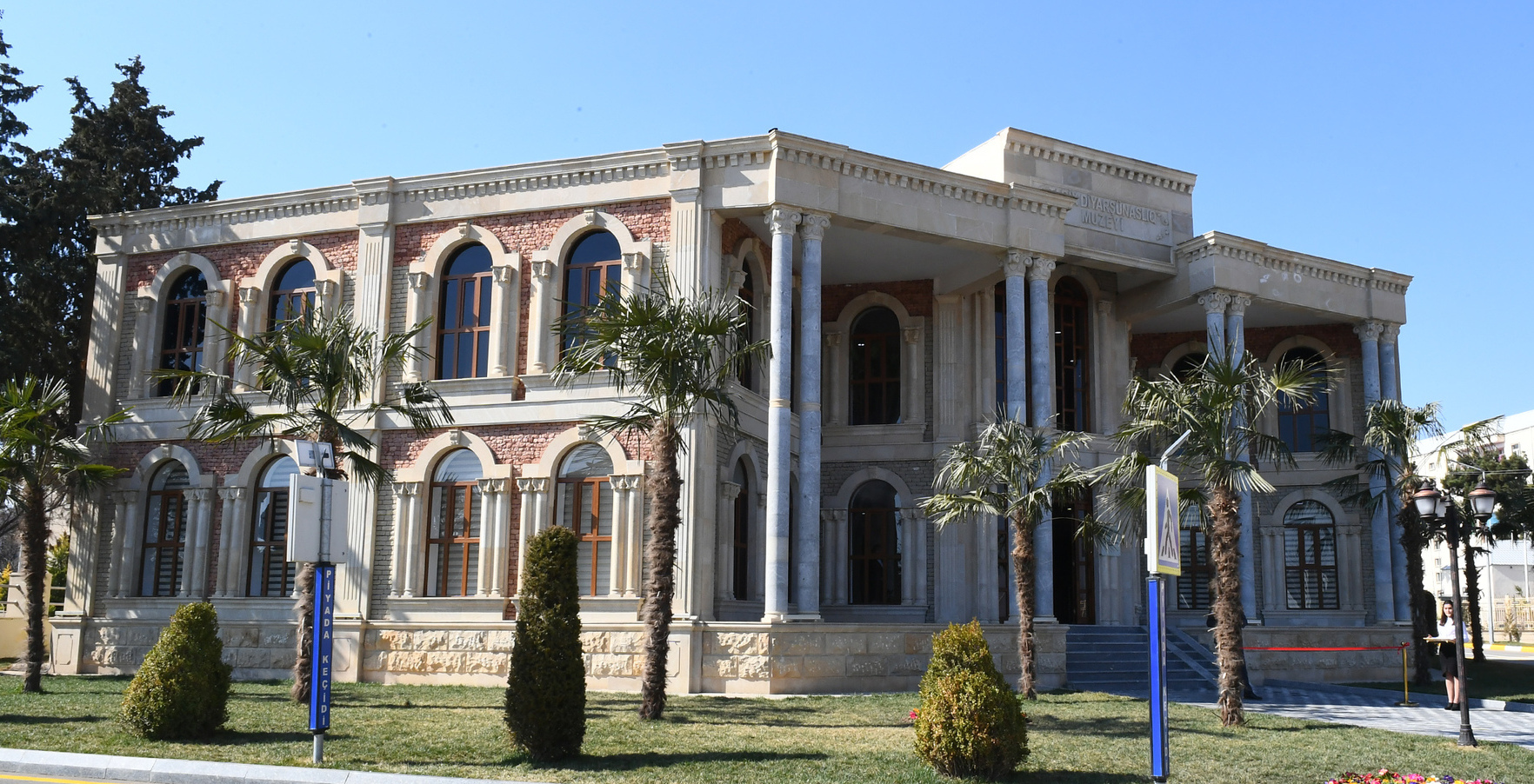
Museum of History

Kindergarten in Tovuz
