= Turan Tovuz =

- Full name: Turan Tovuz
- Nickname: Boz Qurd (Gray Wolf)
- Founded: 23 February 1992; 34 years ago (as Spartak Tovuz)
- Ground: Tovuz City Stadium, Tovuz, Azerbaijan
- Capacity: 6,800
- President: Ehtiram Quliyev
- Manager: Kurban Berdyev
- League: Azerbaijan Premier League
- 2025–26: Azerbaijan Premier League, 3rd of 12
- Website: turantovuzpfk.az
Home colours	Away colours

Turan Tovuz (pronounced [tuɾɑn tovuz]) is an Azerbaijani professional football club based in Tovuz. The club won the Azerbaijan championship once, in 1994–95. The club's home stadium is Tovuz City Stadium.

== History ==
Founded by Vidadi Ahmedov on 23 February 1992, the club was the first Azerbaijani professional football club under the name of Turan Tovuz. However, since 1997, club found itself slipping further and further down the table, which was influenced by financial difficulties.

In the 2011–12 season, ended with Turan in 11th position in the Azerbaijan Premier League, the club's lowest ever league finish. In the 2012–13 season, Turan, for the first time in their history, was relegated to the Azerbaijan First Division, after twenty years in the top flight.

In 2013, the club's owners decided to change the club's name to Turan-T. The club restored their name a few months later.

On 29 March 2025, in the 28th round of the 2024–25 season of the Premier League, Turan Tovuz played their 100th anniversary match, which ended with a 1-4 victory for Qarabağ. After finishing the 2025–26 season in 3rd place, Turan qualified for the second qualifying round of the UEFA Conference League, however on 2 June 2026, UEFA excluded Turan from the tournament due to historical match fixing dating back to 2019 when seven Turan players were banned for life.

=== Domestic history ===
Season	Div.	Pos.	Pl.	W	D	L	GS	GA	P	Domestic Cup
1992	1st	3	36	26	4	6	62	24	56	Quarter-Finals
1993	1st	3	18	12	6	0	34	4	30	Semi-Finals
1993–94	1st	1	30	23	4	3	74	18	50	1/8 Finals
1994–95	1st	2	24	19	2	3	48	14	40	1/8 Finals
1995–96	1st	4	20	9	3	8	26	30	30	Quarter-Finals
1996–97	1st	4	30	19	7	4	48	13	64	Semi-Finals
1997–98	1st	9	26	9	4	13	26	45	31	Quarter-Finals
1998–99	1st	7	32	18	9	5	59	27	63	Semi-Finals
1999–00	1st	10	22	5	5	12	17	36	20	1/8 Finals
2000–01	1st	5	20	9	3	8	42	28	30	Semi-Finals
2001–02	1st	9	30	14	7	9	40	35	49	Quarter-Finals
2002–03	1st									
2003–04	1st	13	26	4	4	18	15	59	16	1/8 Finals
2004–05	1st	4	34	22	7	5	64	21	73	1/8 Finals
2005–06	1st	6	26	11	5	10	27	21	38	Quarter-Finals
2006–07	1st	10	24	5	5	14	24	38	20	Quarter-Finals
2007–08	1st	12	26	4	6	16	21	49	18	1/8 Finals
2008–09	1st	11	26	5	5	16	19	45	20	1/8 Finals
2009–10	1st	9	32	8	9	15	38	43	33	1/8 Finals
2010–11	1st	10	32	7	6	19	24	47	27	Quarter-Finals
2011–12	1st	11	32	6	7	19	26	42	25	First Round
2012–13	1st	11	32	8	6	18	34	59	30	Second round
2013–14	2nd	7	30	13	5	12	52	46	44	N/A
2014–15	2nd	6	30	15	5	10	75	37	50	N/A
2015–16	2nd	7	26	10	6	10	35	31	36	Second round
2016–17	2nd	1	26	18	7	1	62	11	61	Second round
2017–18	2nd	6	27	11	6	10	34	33	39	First round
2018–19	2nd	12	26	6	2	18	29	54	20	N/A
2019–20	2nd	3	12	8	0	4	23	16	24	N/A
2020–21	2nd	3	27	14	9	4	41	22	51	First round
2021–22	2nd	10	24	10	3	11	37	39	33	N/A
2022–23	1st	6	36	10	9	17	36	49	39	Semifinal
2023–24	1st	6	36	13	9	14	53	53	48	Last 16
2024–25	1st	4	36	14	13	9	45	39	55	Last 16
2025–26	1st	3	33	17	8	8	44	27	59	Semi-Final

=== European history ===
As of match played 23 August 1994

Season	Competition	Round	Club	Home	Away	Aggregate
1994-95	UEFA Cup	R1	(Turkey) Fenerbahçe	0–2	0–5	0–7

== Stadium ==
Turan's home ground is Tovuz City Stadium, which has a capacity of 6,800.

== Youth academy ==
Over the years, Turan has been a feeder team for the Azerbaijani national team, providing talented players like Elvin Mammadov, Nadir Nabiyev, Javid Huseynov and Budag Nasirov.

== Honours ==
- Azerbaijan Premier League
  - Winners (1): 1993–94
- Azerbaijan First Division
  - Winners (1): 2016–17

== Squad ==
As of 13 July 2026

Note: Flags indicate national team as defined under FIFA eligibility rules; some limited exceptions apply. Players may hold more than one non-FIFA nationality.

No.	Pos.	Nation	Player
1	GK	TJK	Oleg Baklov
3	DF	BRA	Henrique
4	DF	AZE	Rahil Mammadov
5	DF	PAN	Roderick Miller
7	DF	POR	Jorge Silva
8	MF	CPV	David Tavares
10	MF	AZE	Khayal Najafov
11	FW	POR	Diogo Balau
13	GK	AZE	Mehman Haciyev
15	DF	TOG	Emmanuel Hackman
17	MF	AZE	Ragim Sadykhov

No.	Pos.	Nation	Player
19	MF	ESP	Roberto Olabe
21	MF	FRA	Steeve Beusnard
23	MF	ESP	Álex Serrano
25	DF	MDA	Denis Marandici
28	MF	SRB	Aleksa Janković
32	DF	COL	Haiderson Hurtado
33	DF	SRB	Filip Damjanović
35	GK	RUS	Aleksei Kenyaykin
77	FW	SEN	Ibrahima Wadji
88	DF	AZE	Faiq Hacıyev
90	FW	BRA	Jô

For recent transfers, see Transfers summer 2026.

=== Out on loan ===
Note: Flags indicate national team as defined under FIFA eligibility rules; some limited exceptions apply. Players may hold more than one non-FIFA nationality.

No. / Pos. / Nation / Player; — / DF / AZE / Rufat Ahmadov (at Qabala until 30 June 2026)	No. / Pos. / Nation / Player; — / MF / AZE / Sadiq Shafiyev (at Kapaz until 30 June 2026)

For recent transfers, see Transfers summer 2025.

== Coaching staff ==
Position	Name
Head coach	(Turkmenistan) Kurban Berdyev
Assistant of head coach	(Azerbaijan) Yunis Huseynov (Moldova) Andrei Mațiura (Azerbaijan) Ruslan Abishov
Goalkeeping coach	(Russia) Evgeniy Shchetinin
Fitness coach	(Russia) Yakov Erlikh

== Managers ==
As of 30 June 2024.

- (Azerbaijan) Zahid Huseynov (1992)
- (Azerbaijan) Ruslan Abdullayev (1992–93)
- (Azerbaijan) Kazbek Tuaev (1993–95)
- (Azerbaijan) Khanoghlan Abbasov (1995–00)
- (Azerbaijan) Boyukagha Aghayev (2000–01)
- (Azerbaijan) Nizami Sadigov (2001–02)
- (Kosovo) (Turkey) Naci Şensoy (2002–03)
- (Azerbaijan) Nizami Sadigov (2003–04)
- (Kosovo) (Turkey) Naci Şensoy (2004–05)
- (Azerbaijan) Sakit Aliyev (2005–07)
- (Turkey) Salahattin Darvand (2007–08)
- (Azerbaijan) Etimad Gurbanov (2008–09)
- (Azerbaijan) Nizami Sadigov (2009–10)
- (Azerbaijan) Sakit Aliyev (2010)
- (Georgia (country)) Revaz Dzodzuashvili (2010)
- (Kosovo) (Turkey) Naci Şensoy (2010–11)
- (Azerbaijan) Asgar Abdullayev (July 2011 – 12 Oct)
- (Azerbaijan) Afghan Talibov (2012–13)
- (Azerbaijan) Nadir Nabiyev (2013–2014)
- (Azerbaijan) Badri Kvaratskhelia (2014)
- (Azerbaijan) Nizami Sadigov (2015–2016)
- (Azerbaijan) Asgar Abdullayev (2016–2018)
- (Azerbaijan) Eltay Aslanov (2018–2019)
- (Azerbaijan) Ilham Yadullayev (2019–2021)
- (Azerbaijan) Afghan Talibov (2021–2022)
- (Azerbaijan) Aykhan Abbasov (2022–2024 June)
- (Turkmenistan) Kurban Berdyev (2024 June–)
