= List of Azerbaijan football transfers summer 2023 =

This is a list of Azerbaijan football transfers in the summer transfer window, which takes place between 10 June and 1 September, by club. Only clubs of the 2023–24 Azerbaijan Premier League are included.

== Azerbaijan Premier League 2023-24 ==
=== Araz-Naxçıvan ===
In: Note: Flags indicate national team as defined under FIFA eligibility rules; some limited exceptions apply. Players may hold more than one non-FIFA nationality.

No.	Pos.	Nation	Player
2	DF	AZE	Abdulla Rzayev (on loan from (Azerbaijan) Sabah)
3	DF	AZE	Turan Manafov (from (Azerbaijan) Turan Tovuz)
4	DF	BRA	Igor Ribeiro (from (Paraguay) Tacuary)
5	DF	AZE	Nihad Gurbanli (from (Azerbaijan) Sabail)
7	MF	AZE	Nijat Suleymanov (from (Azerbaijan) Kapaz)
8	MF	BEL	Ismail Azzaoui (from (Netherlands) Heracles Almelo)
9	FW	COD	Elvis Mashike (from (Malta) Ħamrun Spartans)
12	GK	MDA	Cristian Avram (from (Moldova) Petrocub Hîncești)
14	MF	BIH	Mićo Kuzmanović (from (Bosnia and Herzegovina) Sloboda Tuzla)
22	DF	AZE	Elchin Mustafayev (from (Azerbaijan) Shamakhi)
23	DF	POR	Nuno Rodrigues (from (Portugal) Sporting da Covilhã)
27	DF	BIH	Numan Kurdić (from (Belgium) RWD Molenbeek)
29	MF	BRA	Wanderson Maranhão (from (Ukraine) Chornomorets Odesa)
39	MF	AZE	Tural Bayramli (from (Azerbaijan) Sabail)
42	MF	GHA	Mohammed Kadiri
55	DF	AZE	Zamig Aliyev (from (Azerbaijan) Kapaz)
91	GK	BIH	Semir Bukvic (from (Bosnia and Herzegovina) Sloboda Tuzla)

Out: Note: Flags indicate national team as defined under FIFA eligibility rules; some limited exceptions apply. Players may hold more than one non-FIFA nationality.

No.	Pos.	Nation	Player

=== Gabala ===
In: Note: Flags indicate national team as defined under FIFA eligibility rules; some limited exceptions apply. Players may hold more than one non-FIFA nationality.

No.	Pos.	Nation	Player
1	GK	AZE	Rashad Azizli (from (Azerbaijan) Shamakhi)
3	DF	UKR	Zurab Ochihava (from (Azerbaijan) Sabah)
4	DF	BRA	Lucas Áfrico (from (Portugal) Estoril)
5	DF	AZE	Rauf Hüseynli (from (Azerbaijan) Shamakhi)
8	MF	ISR	Gilad Avramov (from (Israel) Hapoel Hadera)
20	MF	FRA	Bilel Aouacheria (from (Portugal) Gil Vicente)
72	MF	ISR	Osama Khalaila (from (Israel) Maccabi Tel Aviv)
99	MF	NGA	Ahmed Isaiah (from (Azerbaijan) Kapaz)
—	FW	GHA	Samuel Tetteh (from (Turkey) Adanaspor)

Out: Note: Flags indicate national team as defined under FIFA eligibility rules; some limited exceptions apply. Players may hold more than one non-FIFA nationality.

No.	Pos.	Nation	Player
1	GK	AZE	Səlahət Ağayev (to (Azerbaijan) Sabail)
4	DF	BRA	Ruan Renato (to (Azerbaijan) Zira)
5	MF	ALB	Isnik Alimi (to (Romania) Sepsi OSK)
7	MF	AZE	Rovlan Muradov (to (Azerbaijan) Sumgayit)
8	MF	UKR	Andriy Stryzhak
12	DF	AZE	Rufat Ahmadov (on loan to (Azerbaijan) Kapaz)
20	MF	AZE	Rauf Rustamli
23	FW	BRA	Raphael Utzig (to (South Korea) Chungnam Asan)
27	DF	AZE	Magsad Isayev (to (Azerbaijan) Zira)
91	FW	BRA	Ramon (to (Malaysia) Sabah)
97	MF	BRA	Felipe (to (Israel) Hapoel Haifa)

=== Kapaz ===
In: Note: Flags indicate national team as defined under FIFA eligibility rules; some limited exceptions apply. Players may hold more than one non-FIFA nationality.

No.	Pos.	Nation	Player
1	GK	BLR	Vladislav Vasilyuchek (from (Belarus) Slutsk)
3	DF	AZE	Vurğun Hüseynov (from (Azerbaijan) Sumgayit)
4	DF	AZE	Vusal Masimov (from (Azerbaijan) Turan Tovuz)
7	MF	AZE	Ehtiram Shahverdiyev (from (Azerbaijan) Turan Tovuz)
8	MF	AZE	Elmir Taghiyev (on loan from (Azerbaijan) Sabail)
22	DF	AZE	Rufat Ahmadov (on loan from (Azerbaijan) Gabala)
24	MF	NGA	Olawale Onanuga (from (Albania) Kastrioti)
88	MF	AZE	Shakir Seyidov (on loan from (Azerbaijan) Sabah)
91	MF	SEN	Latyr Fall (from (Portugal) Estrela da Amadora)
99	MF	AZE	Ali Samadov (from (Azerbaijan) Shamakhi)
—	DF	AZE	Zamig Aliyev (from (Azerbaijan) Qarabağ, previously on loan)
—	MF	GEO	Giorgi Papunashvili (from (Georgia (country)) Telavi)

Out: Note: Flags indicate national team as defined under FIFA eligibility rules; some limited exceptions apply. Players may hold more than one non-FIFA nationality.

No.	Pos.	Nation	Player
7	DF	GEO	Giorgi Kantaria (to (Georgia (country)) Telavi)
10	FW	FRA	Salif Cissé
40	MF	NGA	Ahmed Isaiah (to (Azerbaijan) Gabala)
68	GK	AZE	Orkhan Sadigli (to (Azerbaijan) Sumgayit)
70	MF	AZE	Nijat Suleymanov (to (Azerbaijan) Araz-Naxçıvan)
71	GK	CRO	Mario Mustapic (to (Croatia) NK Dubrava)
74	DF	AZE	Yusif Nabiyev (to (Azerbaijan) Sabail)
77	MF	AZE	Farid Nabiyev (to (Azerbaijan) Turan Tovuz)
—	DF	AZE	Zamig Aliyev (to (Azerbaijan) Araz-Naxçıvan)

=== Neftçi ===
In: Note: Flags indicate national team as defined under FIFA eligibility rules; some limited exceptions apply. Players may hold more than one non-FIFA nationality.

No.	Pos.	Nation	Player
2	DF	AZE	Qara Qarayev (from (Azerbaijan) Qarabağ)
4	DF	HUN	Márk Tamás (from (Romania) Sepsi OSK)
6	MF	PAR	Mudo Valdez (from (Paraguay) Guaraní)
9	FW	BRA	Andre Shinyashiki (from (United States) Charlotte)
10	MF	AZE	Filip Ozobić (from (Azerbaijan) Qarabağ)
12	GK	AZE	Emil Balayev (from (Azerbaijan) Sabail)
16	FW	ARG	Lucas Melano (from (Argentina) Sarmiento)
22	FW	RUS	Reziuan Mirzov (from (Russia) Khimki)
25	FW	NGA	Aaron Olanare (from (Turkey) Erzurumspor)
33	MF	AZE	Turan Valizade (loan return from (Azerbaijan) Turan Tovuz)
44	DF	BRA	Yuri Matias (from (Romania) CFR Cluj)
99	MF	CIV	Erwin Koffi (from (France) Pau)

Out: Note: Flags indicate national team as defined under FIFA eligibility rules; some limited exceptions apply. Players may hold more than one non-FIFA nationality.

No.	Pos.	Nation	Player
2	DF	AZE	Mert Çelik (loan return to (Turkey) İstanbul Başakşehir)
4	DF	GEO	Solomon Kvirkvelia (to (Saudi Arabia) Al-Okhdood)
6	DF	SRB	Vojislav Stanković (to (Serbia) Železničar Pančevo)
9	FW	BRA	Saldanha (loan return to (Japan) JEF United Chiba)
10	MF	PAR	César Meza Colli (to (Saudi Arabia) Ohod Club)
18	MF	GEO	Vato Arveladze (to (Georgia (country)) Dinamo Tbilisi)
20	MF	AZE	Vusal Asgarov (on loan to (Azerbaijan) Iravan)
92	MF	AZE	Omar Gurbanov (to (Azerbaijan) Zira)
—	MF	AZE	Seymur Aliyev (on loan to (Azerbaijan) Iravan)
—	MF	AZE	Asim Alizade
—	MF	AZE	Khayal Najafov (on loan to (Azerbaijan) Turan Tovuz)
—	MF	AZE	Elshad Taghiyev

=== Qarabağ ===
In: Note: Flags indicate national team as defined under FIFA eligibility rules; some limited exceptions apply. Players may hold more than one non-FIFA nationality.

No.	Pos.	Nation	Player
2	DF	BRA	Matheus Silva (from (Bulgaria) Lokomotiv Plovdiv)
17	FW	FRA	Hamidou Keyta (from (Azerbaijan) Zira)
18	FW	BRA	Juninho (from (Portugal) Chaves)
66	MF	CPV	Patrick Andrade (from (Serbia) Partizan)
99	GK	RUS	Andrey Lunyov (from (Germany) Bayer Leverkusen)

Out: Note: Flags indicate national team as defined under FIFA eligibility rules; some limited exceptions apply. Players may hold more than one non-FIFA nationality.

No.	Pos.	Nation	Player
1	GK	AZE	Shakhruddin Magomedaliyev (to (Turkey) Adana Demirspor)
2	MF	AZE	Qara Qarayev (to (Azerbaijan) Neftçi)
9	FW	AZE	Musa Qurbanlı (to (Sweden) Djurgarden)
18	MF	AZE	Ismayil Ibrahimli (on loan to (Azerbaijan) Zira)
19	MF	AZE	Filip Ozobić (to (Azerbaijan) Neftçi)
77	FW	AZE	Ramil Sheydayev (to (Thailand) Buriram United)
—	DF	AZE	Zamig Aliyev (to (Azerbaijan) Kapaz, previously on loan)
—	MF	AZE	Hajiagha Hajili (to (Azerbaijan) Zira, previously on loan)
—	MF	ESP	Gaspar Panadero
—	FW	AZE	Rustam Akhmedzade (loan (Azerbaijan) Zira extended)

=== Sabah ===
In: Note: Flags indicate national team as defined under FIFA eligibility rules; some limited exceptions apply. Players may hold more than one non-FIFA nationality.

No.	Pos.	Nation	Player
5	DF	AZE	Rahman Dashdamirov (from (Azerbaijan) Shamakhi)
8	MF	RUS	Ayaz Guliyev (from (Russia) Khimki)
12	MF	LUX	Vincent Thill (from (Ukraine) Vorskla Poltava)
14	FW	ALG	Ishak Belfodil (from (Qatar) Al-Gharafa)
24	DF	MAR	Marouane Hadhoudi (from (Morocco) Raja Casablanca)
27	FW	CUW	Jearl Margaritha (from (Netherlands) TOP Oss)
28	MF	JAM	Kaheem Parris (on loan from (Ukraine) Dynamo Kyiv)
44	DF	MAR	Sofian Chakla (from (Spain) Ponferradina)
70	MF	NGA	Jesse Sekidika (from (Turkey) Eyüpspor)

Out: Note: Flags indicate national team as defined under FIFA eligibility rules; some limited exceptions apply. Players may hold more than one non-FIFA nationality.

No.	Pos.	Nation	Player
3	DF	UKR	Zurab Ochihava (to (Azerbaijan) Gabala)
6	MF	AZE	Shakir Seyidov (on loan to (Azerbaijan) Kapaz, previously on loan to (Azerbaijan) Turan Tovuz)
8	MF	UKR	Oleksiy Kashchuk (loan return to (Ukraine) Shakhtar Donetsk)
13	DF	SEN	Abdoulaye Ba (to (Portugal) Tondela)
14	DF	AZE	Bəxtiyar Həsənalızadə (to (Turkey) Tuzlaspor)
20	MF	GER	Joy-Lance Mickels (to (Saudi Arabia) Al Faisaly)
99	DF	BRA	Higor Gabriel (released, previously on loan to (Ukraine) Lviv)
—	DF	AZE	Abdulla Rzayev (on loan to (Azerbaijan) Araz-Naxçıvan)
—	FW	AZE	Kamran Guliyev (to (Azerbaijan) Sumgayit, previously on loan to (Azerbaijan) Shamakhi)

=== Sabail ===
In: Note: Flags indicate national team as defined under FIFA eligibility rules; some limited exceptions apply. Players may hold more than one non-FIFA nationality.

No.	Pos.	Nation	Player
1	GK	AZE	Səlahət Ağayev (from (Azerbaijan) Gabala)
3	DF	FRA	Sylvain Deslandes
4	DF	BIH	Adi Mehremić (from (Turkey) İstanbulspor)
9	FW	AZE	Amil Yunanov (from (Azerbaijan) Shamakhi)
18	MF	AZE	Suleyman Ahmadov (from (Azerbaijan) Sumgayit)
21	MF	NED	Anass Najah (from (Netherlands) Telstar)
27	MF	POR	Pedro Nuno (from (Turkey) Adanaspor)
44	MF	ISR	Yadin Lugasi (from (Israel) Hapoel Ironi Kiryat Shmona)
55	DF	ISR	Nir Bardea (from (Israel) Maccabi Bnei Reineh)
74	DF	AZE	Yusif Nabiyev (from (Azerbaijan) Kapaz)
88	MF	ANG	Paná (from (Portugal) Académico de Viseu)
90	FW	MAD	Alexandre Ramalingom (from (France) Sedan)

Out: Note: Flags indicate national team as defined under FIFA eligibility rules; some limited exceptions apply. Players may hold more than one non-FIFA nationality.

No.	Pos.	Nation	Player
1	GK	AZE	Emil Balayev (to (Azerbaijan) Neftçi)
3	DF	AZE	Turan Manafov (to (Azerbaijan) Araz-Naxçıvan)
4	MF	UKR	Maksym Chekh (loan return to (Ukraine) Shakhtar Donetsk)
5	DF	UKR	Petro Stasyuk (to (Ukraine) LNZ Cherkasy)
7	MF	AZE	Ruslan Hajiyev (to (Azerbaijan) Iravan)
8	MF	AZE	Elmir Taghiyev (on loan to (Azerbaijan) Kapaz)
9	FW	AZE	Mirabdulla Abbasov (to (Azerbaijan) Iravan)
11	FW	CIV	Goba Zakpa
14	MF	AZE	Rahid Amirguliyev (Retired)
21	FW	UGA	Luwagga Kizito (to (Israel) Hapoel Rishon LeZion)
23	DF	BRA	Gustavo França
27	DF	BUL	Emil Martinov (to (Bulgaria) Slavia Sofia)
30	MF	ARG	Franco Mazurek (to (Israel) Ironi Tiberias)
55	DF	AZE	Nihad Gurbanli (to (Azerbaijan) Araz-Naxçıvan)
88	MF	SRB	Matija Ljujić (loan return to (Hungary) Újpest)
—	MF	AZE	Coşqun Diniyev (to (Turkey) Ümraniyespor, previously signed from (Azerbaijan) Zira)

=== Sumgayit ===
In: Note: Flags indicate national team as defined under FIFA eligibility rules; some limited exceptions apply. Players may hold more than one non-FIFA nationality.

No.	Pos.	Nation	Player
1	GK	AZE	Mekhti Dzhenetov (from (Azerbaijan) Zira)
4	DF	PAK	Easah Suliman (from (Portugal) Vitória de Guimarães)
7	MF	AZE	Rovlan Muradov (from (Azerbaijan) Gabala)
9	FW	EST	Erik Sorga (from (Bulgaria) Lokomotiv Plovdiv)
11	FW	CHA	Casimir Ninga (from (Cyprus) Anorthosis Famagusta)
12	DF	CIV	Abou Dosso (from (Israel) Bnei Sakhnin)
15	GK	AZE	Orkhan Sadigli (from (Azerbaijan) Kapaz)
18	FW	MKD	Kristijan Velinovski (from (North Macedonia) AP Brera)
19	MF	ISR	Roi Kahat (from (Israel) Hapoel Ironi Kiryat Shmona)
30	FW	AZE	Kamran Guliyev (from (Azerbaijan) Sabah)
58	MF	BRA	Octávio (from (Bulgaria) CSKA 1948 Sofia)
60	MF	BDI	Trésor Mossi (from (Belgium) KVC Westerlo)

Out: Note: Flags indicate national team as defined under FIFA eligibility rules; some limited exceptions apply. Players may hold more than one non-FIFA nationality.

No.	Pos.	Nation	Player
3	DF	AZE	Vurğun Hüseynov (to (Azerbaijan) Kapaz)
6	MF	AZE	Vusal Isgandarli (to (Albania) Egnatia)
7	FW	LBR	Terrence Tisdell
9	FW	GHA	Karim Abubakar (to (Malta) Sliema Wanderers)
11	MF	AZE	Rufat Abdullazade (to (Azerbaijan) Sabail)
12	DF	MKD	Todor Todoroski (to (Hungary) Zalaegerszeg)
13	GK	AZE	Aydın Bayramov (to (Azerbaijan) Turan Tovuz)
18	MF	AZE	Suleyman Ahmadov (to (Azerbaijan) Sabail)
22	MF	BRA	Diego Carioca (loan return to (Ukraine) Kolos Kovalivka)
24	MF	AZE	Elshan Abdullayev (to (Azerbaijan) Iravan)
25	GK	RUS	Ilnur Valiev (to (Russia) Rubin-2 Kazan)
37	MF	MLI	Alya Toure (loan return to (Turkey) İstanbul Başakşehir)

=== Turan Tovuz ===
In: Note: Flags indicate national team as defined under FIFA eligibility rules; some limited exceptions apply. Players may hold more than one non-FIFA nationality.

No.	Pos.	Nation	Player
2	DF	AZE	Sertan Taşqın (from (Azerbaijan) Zira)
6	MF	BRA	Brunão (from (Portugal) Leixões)
7	FW	BRA	Pachu (from (Portugal) Trofense)
10	MF	AZE	Khayal Najafov (on loan from (Azerbaijan) Neftçi)
13	GK	AZE	Aydın Bayramov (from (Azerbaijan) Sumgayit)
14	DF	AZE	Slavik Alkhasov (from (Azerbaijan) Zira)
15	DF	TOG	Emmanuel Hackman (from (Serbia) Mladost Novi Sad)
18	MF	AZE	Budag Nasirov
23	MF	ESP	Álex Serrano (from (Bulgaria) Hebar Pazardzhik)
77	MF	AZE	Farid Nabiyev (from (Azerbaijan) Kapaz)
79	FW	BUL	Martin Petkov (from (Bulgaria) Septemvri Sofia)
80	FW	NGA	Otto John (from (Kosovo) Dukagjini)

Out: Note: Flags indicate national team as defined under FIFA eligibility rules; some limited exceptions apply. Players may hold more than one non-FIFA nationality.

No.	Pos.	Nation	Player
6	MF	AZE	Turan Valizade (loan return to (Azerbaijan) Neftçi)
7	MF	AZE	Ehtiram Shahverdiyev (to (Azerbaijan) Kapaz)
8	MF	AZE	Shakir Seyidov (loan return to (Azerbaijan) Sabah)
15	DF	AZE	Vusal Masimov (to (Azerbaijan) Kapaz)
17	MF	NGA	Nathan Oduwa
19	FW	CMR	Rooney Eva Wankewai (to (Bulgaria) CSKA 1948 Sofia)
23	MF	NGA	Henry Okebugwu
55	DF	RSA	Siyanda Xulu (to (South Africa) SuperSport United)

=== Zira ===
In: Note: Flags indicate national team as defined under FIFA eligibility rules; some limited exceptions apply. Players may hold more than one non-FIFA nationality.

No.	Pos.	Nation	Player
4	DF	BRA	Ruan Renato (from (Azerbaijan) Gabala)
5	DF	CIV	Stephane Acka (from (Israel) Sektzia Ness Ziona)
11	FW	AZE	Rustam Akhmedzade (loan extended from (Azerbaijan) Qarabağ)
15	MF	CIV	Pierre Zebli (from (Bulgaria) Lokomotiv Plovdiv)
16	MF	AZE	Fuad Bayramov (on loan from (Azerbaijan) Shamakhi)
19	MF	GUI	Salifou Soumah (from (France) Le Havre)
20	MF	AZE	Ismayil Ibrahimli (on loan from (Azerbaijan) Qarabağ)
21	MF	AZE	Hajiagha Hajili (from (Azerbaijan) Qarabağ, previously on loan)
77	DF	AZE	Magsad Isayev (from (Azerbaijan) Gabala)
97	GK	POR	Tiago Silva (from (Portugal) Trofense)
—	MF	AZE	Omar Gurbanov (from (Azerbaijan) Neftçi)

Out: Note: Flags indicate national team as defined under FIFA eligibility rules; some limited exceptions apply. Players may hold more than one non-FIFA nationality.

No.	Pos.	Nation	Player
1	GK	AZE	Mekhti Dzhenetov (to (Azerbaijan) Sumgayit)
2	DF	AZE	Sertan Taşqın (to (Azerbaijan) Turan Tovuz)
5	DF	BEN	Moïse Adiléhou (to (Israel) Maccabi Petah Tikva)
9	FW	BEL	Loris Brogno (to (Italy) Sangiuliano City)
14	FW	FRA	Hamidou Keyta (to (Azerbaijan) Qarabağ)
15	DF	AZE	Ruslan Abishov
17	FW	GNB	Toni Gomes (to (Israel) Hapoel Hadera)
18	DF	AZE	Slavik Alkhasov (to (Azerbaijan) Turan Tovuz)
47	FW	NED	Mo Hamdaoui (to (Netherlands) ADO Den Haag)
77	MF	AZE	Mirsahib Abbasov (to (Azerbaijan) Iravan)
91	MF	AZE	Coşqun Diniyev (to (Azerbaijan) Sabail)
96	MF	HAI	Wilde-Donald Guerrier (to (Lithuania) Panevėžys)
—	DF	AZE	Cəlal Hüseynov (to (Bulgaria) Arda Kardzhali, previously on loan to (Azerbaijan) Shamakhi)
