= 2023–24 Araz-Naxçıvan PFK season =

Araz-Naxçıvan
2023-24 season
- Manager: Azer Baghirov
- Stadium: Dalga Arena
- Premier League: 8th
- Azerbaijan Cup: Quarterfinal vs Gabala
- Top goalscorer: League: Orkhan Aliyev (9); All: Orkhan Aliyev (13)

The Araz-Naxçıvan PFK 2023–24 season was Araz-Naxçıvan's first season back in the Azerbaijan Premier League since 2014–15.

== Squad ==
As of match played 26 May 2024

No.	Name	Nationality	Position	Date of birth (age)	Signed from	Signed in	Contract ends	Apps.	Goals
Goalkeepers
1	Vusal Shabanov	(Azerbaijan)	GK	10 May 2002 (aged 22)	Zagatala	2022			
12	Cristian Avram	(Moldova)	GK	27 July 1994 (aged 29)	Petrocub Hîncești	2023		37	0
91	Semir Bukvic	(Bosnia and Herzegovina)	GK	21 May 1991 (aged 33)	Sloboda Tuzla	2023		3	0
Defenders
2	Abdulla Rzayev	(Azerbaijan)	DF	12 March 2002 (aged 22)	on loan from Sabah	2023		28	1
3	Turan Manafov	(Azerbaijan)	DF	19 August 1998 (aged 25)	Sabail	2023		36	3
4	Igor Ribeiro	(Brazil)	DF	4 October 1996 (aged 27)	Tacuary	2023		29	1
5	Nihad Gurbanli	(Azerbaijan)	DF	10 April 2001 (aged 23)	Sabail	2023		1	0
13	Mirali Ahmadov	(Azerbaijan)	DF	16 April 2003 (aged 21)	Sabail	2023		1	0
22	Elchin Mustafayev	(Azerbaijan)	DF	5 July 2000 (aged 23)	Shamakhi	2023		22	0
27	Numan Kurdić	(Bosnia and Herzegovina)	DF	1 July 1999 (aged 24)	RWD Molenbeek	2023		36	1
55	Zamig Aliyev	(Azerbaijan)	DF	5 May 2001 (aged 23)	Kapaz	2023		21	0
Midfielders
6	Vadim Abdullayev	(Azerbaijan)	MF	17 December 1994 (aged 29)	Unattached	2022			
7	Nijat Suleymanov	(Azerbaijan)	MF	15 November 1998 (aged 25)	Kapaz	2023		27	3
11	Ramin Nasirli	(Azerbaijan)	MF	24 September 2002 (aged 21)	Neftçi	2024		12	0
17	Ildar Alekperov	(Azerbaijan)	MF	21 April 2001 (aged 23)	on loan from Sabah	2024		10	0
19	Axel Ngando	(France)	MF	13 July 1993 (aged 30)	Grenoble	2023		21	3
23	Nuno Rodrigues	(Portugal)	MF	30 November 1994 (aged 29)	Sporting da Covilhã	2023		37	2
29	Wanderson Maranhão	(Brazil)	MF	26 July 1994 (aged 29)	Chornomorets Odesa	2023		35	0
39	Tural Bayramli	(Azerbaijan)	MF	7 January 1998 (aged 26)	Sabail	2023		32	0
42	Mohammed Kadiri	(Ghana)	MF	7 March 1996 (aged 28)	Dynamo Kyiv	2023		35	4
88	Tugay Alizada	(Ukraine)	MF	8 July 2002 (aged 21)	Kremin Kremenchuk	2022			
Forwards
8	Ismail Azzaoui	(Belgium)	FW	6 January 1998 (aged 26)	Heracles	2023		30	2
9	Elvis Mashike	(Democratic Republic of the Congo)	FW	6 June 1994 (aged 29)	Ħamrun Spartans	2023		31	7
10	Orkhan Aliyev	(Azerbaijan)	FW	21 December 1995 (aged 28)	Unattached	2022			
14	Mićo Kuzmanović	(Bosnia and Herzegovina)	FW	18 March 1996 (aged 28)	Tuzla City	2023		39	4
Out on loan
11	Bayramali Qurbanov	(Azerbaijan)	FW	8 November 2002 (aged 21)	Sabail	2022			
Left during the season

== Transfers ==
=== In ===
Date	Position	Nationality	Name	From	Fee	Ref.
1 June 2023	GK	(Moldova)	Cristian Avram	Petrocub Hîncești	Undisclosed	
1 June 2023	DF	(Azerbaijan)	Nihad Gurbanli	Sabail	Undisclosed	
1 June 2023	DF	(Azerbaijan)	Turan Manafov	Turan Tovuz	Undisclosed	
1 June 2023	DF	(Azerbaijan)	Elchin Mustafayev	Shamakhi	Undisclosed	
1 June 2023	MF	(Azerbaijan)	Tural Bayramli	Sabail	Undisclosed	
1 June 2023	MF	(Azerbaijan)	Nijat Suleymanov	Kapaz	Undisclosed	
1 June 2023	MF	(Bosnia and Herzegovina)	Mićo Kuzmanović	Sloboda Tuzla	Undisclosed	
17 July 2023	MF	(Brazil)	Wanderson Maranhão	Chornomorets Odesa	Undisclosed	
17 July 2023	MF	(Portugal)	Nuno Rodrigues	Sporting da Covilhã	Undisclosed	
18 July 2023	GK	(Bosnia and Herzegovina)	Semir Bukvic	Sloboda Tuzla	Undisclosed	
24 July 2023	DF	(Bosnia and Herzegovina)	Numan Kurdić	RWD Molenbeek	Undisclosed	
24 July 2023	DF	(Azerbaijan)	Zamig Aliyev	Kapaz	Undisclosed	
28 July 2023	MF	(Ghana)	Mohammed Kadiri	Unattached	Free	
1 August 2023	FW	(Belgium)	Ismail Azzaoui	Heracles Almelo	Undisclosed	
2 August 2023	FW	(Democratic Republic of the Congo)	Elvis Mashike	Ħamrun Spartans	Undisclosed	
3 August 2023	DF	(Brazil)	Igor Ribeiro	Tacuary	Undisclosed	
23 January 2024	MF	(Azerbaijan)	Ramin Nasirli	Neftçi	Undisclosed	

=== Loans in ===
Date from	Position	Nationality	Name	From	Date to	Ref.
17 July 2023	DF	(Azerbaijan)	Abdulla Rzayev	Sabah	End of season	
10 January 2024	MF	(Azerbaijan)	Ildar Alekperov	Sabah	End of season	

=== Loans out ===
Date from	Position	Nationality	Name	To	Date to	Ref.
16 January 2024	FW	(Azerbaijan)	Bayramali Qurbanov	Difai Ağsu	End of season	

== Friendlies ==
10 January 2024	Zira	2–1	Araz-Naxçıvan	Baku
15:00 AZT (UTC+4)	I.Muradov 55'; Soumah 71'	Report	O.Aliyev 68'

15 January 2024	Gabala	2–0	Araz-Naxçıvan	Qabala
AZT (UTC+4)	Allach 14'; Tetteh 57'	Report		Stadium: Gabala City Stadium

== Competitions ==
=== Overview ===
Competition	First match	Last match	Starting round	Final position	Record							
Competition	First match	Last match	Starting round	Final position	Pld	W	D	L	GF	GA	GD	Win %
Premier League	4 August 2023	26 May 2024	Matchday 1	8th	36	9	9	18	31	50	−19	25.00
Azerbaijan Cup	29 November 2023	9 February 2024	Second Round	Quarterfinal	4	2	1	1	15	6	+9	50.00
Total					40	11	10	19	46	56	−10	27.50

Last updated: 26 May 2024
Source: Competitions

=== Premier League ===
==== Results summary ====
Overall								Home						Away					
Pld	W	D	L	GF	GA	GD	Pts	W	D	L	GF	GA	GD	W	D	L	GF	GA	GD
36	9	9	18	31	50	−19	36	6	5	7	16	20	−4	3	4	11	15	30	−15

Last updated: 26 May 2024.
Source: See Results

==== Results by round ====
Round	1	2	3	4	5	6	7	8	9	10	11	12	13	14	15	16	17	18	19	20	21	22	23	24	25	26	27	28	29	30	31	32	33	34	35	36
Ground	H	H	A	H	A	H	A	H	A	A	H	A	H	A	H	A	H	A	A	H	A	H	A	H	A	A	H	A	H	A	H	A	H	H	A	H
Result	L	W	L	D	W	W	L	W	D	W	W	L	L	D	D	D	W	L	L	D	L	W	D	L	L	L	W	L	L	L	L	W	L	L	L	D
Position	9	7	6	8	7	5	5	4	4	4	3	4	5	5	5	5	4	6	6	6	6	6	6	8	8	8	8	8	8	8	8	8	9	9	9	8

Updated to match(es) played on 26 May 2024. Source: See Results
A = Away; H = Home; W = Win; D = Draw; L = Loss

==== Results ====
4 August 2023 1	Araz-Naxçıvan	0–3	Turan Tovuz	Baku
20:00 AZT (UTC+4)	Suleymanov (yellow card) 82'	Report	Miller (yellow card) 45+1'; Petkov 53', 87' (yellow card) 90+4'; John 68'; Rzayev (yellow card) 85'	Stadium: Dalga Arena; Referee: Ingilab Mammadov

12 August 2023 2	Araz-Naxçıvan	2–0	Gabala	Baku
18:30 AZT (UTC+4)	Azzaoui 17'; Abdullayev (yellow card) 80'; Mashike 83' (yellow card) 84'	Report	Hani (yellow card) 24'; Isgandarov (red card) 90+4'	Stadium: Dalga Arena; Referee: Farid Haciyev

20 August 2023 3	Qarabağ	2–1	Araz-Naxçıvan	Baku
18:00 AZT (UTC+4)	Diakhaby 15'; Cafarguliyev (yellow card) 88'; Guliyev (yellow card) 90+1'; Zoubir 90+5'	Report	Manafov (yellow card) 29'; Kuzmanović 57'; Wanderson (yellow card) 59'; Kadiri (yellow card) 85'; Rzayev (yellow card) 88'	Stadium: Azersun Arena; Referee: Nicat İsmayıllı

25 August 2023 4	Araz-Naxçıvan	1–1	Sumgayit	Baku
20:00 AZT (UTC+4)	Kadiri (yellow card) 45'; Manafov 73'	Report	K.Aliyev (yellow card) 29'; Octávio (yellow card) 49'; Sorga (yellow card) 52'; Muradov 63' (pen.); Badalov (yellow card) 75'; Suleymanli (yellow card) 90+1'	Stadium: Dalga Arena; Referee: Kamal Umudlu

3 September 2023 5	Kapaz	1–2	Araz-Naxçıvan	Ganja
18:00 AZT (UTC+4)	Vasilyuchek (yellow card) 38'; Kvirkvia 78' (pen.) (yellow card) 90+1'; Masimov (yellow card) 90+1'	Report	Rzayev (yellow card) 32'; O.Aliyev 40' (pen.), 45'; Igor (yellow card) 57'; Mashike (yellow card) 84'	Stadium: City Stadium; Referee: Kamran Aliyev

16 September 2023 6	Araz-Naxçıvan	1–0	Neftçi	Baku
18:00 AZT (UTC+4)	Abdullayev (yellow card) 47'; Kadiri (yellow card) 49' (yellow-red card) 86'; O.Aliyev 81' (pen.); Wanderson (yellow card) 87'; Azzaoui (yellow card) 90'	Report	Matias (yellow card) 8'; Brkić (yellow card) 81'; Mahmudov (yellow card) 87'	Stadium: Dalga Arena; Referee: Ingilab Mammadov

24 September 2023 7	Sabail	1–0	Araz-Naxçıvan	Baku
19:30 AZT (UTC+4)	Nuno 45+1' (pen.) (yellow card) 90+3'; Haziyev (yellow card) 85'; Najah (yellow card) 90+6'	Report	Bayramli (yellow card) 63'; Wanderson (yellow card) 90+3'	Stadium: Bayil Arena; Referee: Raad Ahmadov

1 October 2023 8	Araz-Naxçıvan	1–0	Zira	Baku
AZT (UTC+4)	Rodrigues 78'; Igor (yellow card) 83' (yellow-red card) 90+4'	Report	Ruan (yellow card) 25'; Isayev (yellow card) 43'; Kulach (yellow card) 83'	Stadium: Dalga Arena; Referee: Ali Aliyev

7 October 2023 9	Sabah	1–1	Araz-Naxçıvan	Masazır
18:00 AZT (UTC+4)	Nuriyev 82'	Report	Wanderson (yellow card) 67'; Belfodil 76' (pen.); Z.Aliyev (yellow card) 83'	Stadium: Bank Respublika Arena; Referee: Rauf Jabarov

22 October 2023 10	Gabala	1–4	Araz-Naxçıvan	Qabala
16:30 AZT (UTC+4)	Qirtimov (red card) 29'; Khalaila (red card) 29'; Tetteh 37'	Report	Abdullayev (yellow card) 19'; Manafov 32'; Kadiri 45'; Mashike 69'; Kuzmanović 72'	Stadium: City Stadium; Referee: Tural Qurbanov

30 October 2023 11	Araz-Naxçıvan	2–1	Qarabağ	Baku
19:00 AZT (UTC+4)	Wanderson (yellow card) 17'; O.Aliyev (yellow card) 31' (goal) 75' (pen.); Azzaoui (yellow card) 78'; Ngando (yellow card) 86'; Avram (yellow card) 88'; Mashike 90+1'	Report	Gugeshashvili (yellow card) 59'; Janković (yellow card) 76'; Benzia (yellow card) 78'; Zoubir (yellow card) 90+4'; Juninho 90+7'; Richard (yellow card) 90+7'	Stadium: Tofiq Bahramov Republican Stadium; Referee: Aliyar Ağayev

4 November 2023 12	Sumgayit	2–0	Araz-Naxçıvan	Sumgait
18:00 AZT (UTC+4)	Muradov 16'; K.Aliyev (yellow card) 30'; Kahat 69'; Mossi (yellow card) 90+5'	Report	Wanderson (yellow card) 64'; Qurbanov (yellow card) 90+2'	Stadium: Kapital Bank Arena; Referee: Elcin Məsiyev

10 November 2023 13	Araz-Naxçıvan	0–1	Kapaz	Baku
19:00 AZT (UTC+4)	Rodrigues (yellow card) 69'; Igor (yellow card) 90+3'	Report	Fall (yellow card) 37'; Niane 75'; Onanuga (yellow card) 82'; Alijanov (yellow card) 84'	Stadium: Dalga Arena; Referee: Raad Ahmadov

26 November 2023 14	Neftçi	1–1	Araz-Naxçıvan	Baku
15:30 AZT (UTC+4)	Matias 40' (yellow card) 65'; Mahmudov (yellow card) 56'	Report	Kurdić (yellow card) 45'; Rodrigues (yellow card) 47'; Wanderson (yellow card) 84'; O.Aliyev 90+3'	Stadium: Neftçi Arena; Referee: Farid Haciyev

2 December 2023 15	Araz-Naxçıvan	1–1	Sabail	Baku
16:00 AZT (UTC+4)	Abdullayev (yellow card) 14'; Kadiri 18'	Report	Hasanov (yellow card) 28'; Lugasi (yellow card) 85'; Mehremić (yellow card) 88'; Kurdić 90+3' (o.g.)	Stadium: Dalga Arena; Referee: Ravan Hamzazada

9 December 2023 16	Zira	0–0	Araz-Naxçıvan	Zirə
17:00 AZT (UTC+4)	Sadykhov (yellow card) 43'; Alıyev (yellow card) 76'	Report	Kuzmanović (yellow card) 61'; O.Aliyev (yellow card) 78'	Stadium: Zira Olympic Sport Complex Stadium; Referee: Raad Ahmadov

15 December 2023 17	Araz-Naxçıvan	2–0	Sabah	Baku
15:00 AZT (UTC+4)	Letić 40' (o.g.); Mustafayev (yellow card) 52'; Kuzmanović (yellow card) 57'; O.Aliyev (yellow card) 68'; Manafov 71'	Report	Nuriyev (yellow card) 16'; Hadhoudi (yellow card) 48'; Letić (yellow card) 64'; Thill (yellow card) 70'	Stadium: Dalga Arena; Referee: Farid Haciyev

24 December 2023 18	Turan Tovuz	3–1	Araz-Naxçıvan	Tovuz
12:00 AZT (UTC+4)	Najafov 4'; Brunão 16'; Serrano (yellow card) 26'; Guseynov 90'	Report	Wanderson (yellow card) 35'; Azzaoui 58' (pen.)	Stadium: City Stadium; Referee: Ravan Hamzazada

23 January 2024 19	Qarabağ	3–1	Araz-Naxçıvan	Baku
19:00 AZT (UTC+4)	Kurdić 6' (o.g.); Zoubir 22', 61'; Romão (yellow card) 68'	Report	Kuzmanović (yellow card) 27'; Kadiri 71'; Rzayev (yellow card) 74'	Stadium: Tofiq Bahramov Republican Stadium; Referee: Rauf Allahverdiyev

28 January 2024 20	Araz-Naxçıvan	1–1	Sumgayit	Baku
15:00 AZT (UTC+4)	Abdullayev (yellow card) 6'; Igor (yellow card) 19'; Rodrigues 59'; Wanderson (yellow card) 73'	Report	Suliman 45' (yellow card) 90+5'; K.Aliyev (yellow card) 52'	Stadium: Dalga Arena; Referee: Alişar Ağayev

5 February 2024 21	Kapaz	3–1	Araz-Naxçıvan	Ganja
15:00 AZT (UTC+4)	Shahverdiyev 19', 34'; Onanuga (yellow card) 64'; Yunanov 69'	Report	O.Aliyev 28'	Stadium: City Stadium; Referee: Kamal Umudlu

13 February 2024 22	Araz-Naxçıvan	1–0	Neftçi	Baku
19:30 AZT (UTC+4)	Bayramli (yellow card) 29'; Kadiri (yellow card) 39'; O.Aliyev 90+2' (pen.); Mustafayev (yellow card) 90+2'	Report	Conteh (yellow card) 56'; Qarayev (yellow card) 73'; Mirzov (yellow card) 82'; Jafarov (yellow card) 90+2'; Mahmudov (yellow card) 90+5'	Stadium: Dalga Arena; Referee: Raad Ahmadov

17 February 2024 23	Sabail	2–2	Araz-Naxçıvan	Baku
18:30 AZT (UTC+4)	Ramalingom 13', 61'; Mehremić (yellow card) 90+4'	Report	O.Aliyev 30', 35'; Igor (yellow card) 69'; Manafov (yellow card) 76'	Stadium: Bayil Arena; Referee: Kamran Aliyev

25 February 2024 24	Araz-Naxçıvan	0–3	Zira	Baku
16:30 AZT (UTC+4)		Report	Alıyev (yellow card) 16'; Wanderson 20' (o.g.); Ruan (yellow card) 56'; Sadykhov 75'; Utzig 77'	Stadium: Dalga Arena; Referee: Rauf Allahverdiyev

2 March 2024 25	Sabah	2–0	Araz-Naxçıvan	Masazır
18:30 AZT (UTC+4)	Apeh 54'; Letić (yellow card) 59'; Parris 90+6' (pen.)	Report	Kadiri (yellow card) 32'; Kuzmanović (yellow card) 57'	Stadium: Bank Respublika Arena; Referee: Kamal Umudlu

10 March 2024 26	Turan Tovuz	2–0	Araz-Naxçıvan	Tovuz
15:30 AZT (UTC+4)	Hackman (yellow card) 61'; Miller (yellow card) 69'; Souza 78', 80'; Brunão (yellow card) 87'; Turabov (yellow card) 87'; Alkhasov (yellow card) 90+3'; Bayramov (yellow card) 90+6'	Report	Manafov (yellow card) 38'; Shabanov (red card) 78' Igor (yellow card) 79'; Kurdić (yellow card) 80'; Abdullayev (yellow card) 87'	Stadium: City Stadium; Referee: Raad Ahmadov

16 March 2024 27	Araz-Naxçıvan	1–1	Gabala	Baku
18:30 AZT (UTC+4)	Abdullayev (yellow card) 16'; Kurdić 43' (red card) 59'; Wanderson (yellow card) 90+6'	Report	Aouacheria (yellow card) 45+3'; Qirtimov (yellow card) 52'; Khalaila 67'; Sultanov (yellow card) 74'	Stadium: Dalga Arena; Referee: Elcin Masiyev

31 March 2024 28	Sumgayit	1–0	Araz-Naxçıvan	Sumgait
18:00 AZT (UTC+4)	Ninga 7' (pen.) (yellow card) 88'; Murata (yellow card) 68'; Octávio (yellow card) 81'; Muradov (yellow card) 90+5'	Report		Stadium: Kapital Bank Arena; Referee: Kamranbay Rahimov

5 April 2024 29	Araz-Naxçıvan	1–2	Kapaz	Baku
20:00 AZT (UTC+4)	Kuzmanović 16'; Z.Aliyev (yellow card) 19'; Rodrigues (yellow card) 62'; Bayramli (yellow card) 89'	Report	Shahverdiyev (yellow card) 37'; Júnior (yellow card) 52' (goal) 54'; Kvirkvia 62'; Masimov (yellow card) 90+1'	Stadium: Dalga Arena; Referee: Farid Haciyev

13 April 2024 30	Neftçi	3–0	Araz-Naxçıvan	Baku
19:00 AZT (UTC+4)	Moreno 1'; Hajiyev 45' (yellow card) 78'; Salahlı (yellow card) 56'; Bogomolsky (yellow card) 81'; Igor 87' (o.g.)	Report	Kadiri (yellow card) 69'; Bayramli (yellow card) 73'; Manafov (yellow card) 78'	Stadium: Neftçi Arena; Referee: Aliyar Ağayev

21 April 2024 31	Araz-Naxçıvan	0–2	Sabail	Baku
19:00 AZT (UTC+4)	Kurdić (yellow card) 34'; Igor (yellow card) 39'	Report	Ramalingom 32' (pen.); Naghiyev (yellow card) 35'; Nabiyev 75'	Stadium: Dalga Arena; Referee: Tural Qurbanov

29 April 2024 32	Zira	0–1	Araz-Naxçıvan	Zirə
19:00 AZT (UTC+4)	Alıyev (yellow card) 38'; Chantakias (yellow card) 45'; Kulach (yellow card) 90+3'	Report	Igor 89'; Kadiri (yellow card) 90+6'	Stadium: Zira Olympic Sport Complex Stadium; Referee: Javif Jalilov

5 May 2024 33	Araz-Naxçıvan	0–1	Sabah	Baku
19:00 AZT (UTC+4)	Kadiri (yellow card) 49'	Report	Guliyev 1'; Seydiyev (yellow card) 6'; Camalov (yellow card) 85'; Chakla (yellow card) 90+6'	Stadium: Dalga Arena; Referee: Aliyar Ağayev

11 May 2024 34	Araz-Naxçıvan	0–1	Turan Tovuz	Baku
17:00 AZT (UTC+4)	Rodrigues (yellow card) 66'; Kurdić (yellow card) 90+1'; Kuzmanović (yellow card) 90+5'	Report	Serrano 63'; Guliyev (yellow card) 71'; Marandici (yellow card) 90+5'	Stadium: Dalga Arena; Referee: Kamal Umudlu

19 May 2024 35	Gabala	2–0	Araz-Naxçıvan	Qabala
16:00 AZT (UTC+4)	Safarov (yellow card) 38'; Khalaila 51'; Aouacheria (yellow card) 80'; Allach 87'	Report	Kadiri (yellow card) 12'; Azzaoui (yellow card) 25'; Wanderson (yellow card) 25'; Rzayev (yellow card) 49'; Kuzmanović (yellow card) 90+2'	Stadium: City Stadium; Referee: Elvin Bayramov

26 May 2024 36	Araz-Naxçıvan	2–2	Qarabağ	Baku
19:30 AZT (UTC+4)	Mashike 3'; Rzayev 59'	Report	Juninho 28'; Abdullayev 32' (o.g.)	Stadium: Azersun Arena; Referee: Akbar Ahmadov

==== League table ====
Pos	Team	Pld	W	D	L	GF	GA	GD	Pts	Qualification or relegation
6	Turan Tovuz	36	13	9	14	53	53	0	48	
7	Sabail	36	11	9	16	50	60	−10	42	
8	Araz-Naxçıvan	36	9	9	18	31	50	−19	36	
9	Kapaz	36	9	8	19	39	67	−28	35	
10	Gabala (R)	36	7	5	24	30	64	−34	26	Relegation to Azerbaijan First Division

Source: Soccerway
Rules for classification: 1) Points; 2) Head-to-head points; 3) Head-to-head goal difference; 4) Head-to-head goals scored; 5) Head-to-head away goals scored (only if two teams); 6) Goal difference; 7) Goals scored.
(R) Relegated

=== Azerbaijan Cup ===
29 November 2023 Second Round	Kür-Araz	1–6	Araz-Naxçıvan	Baku
15:00 AZT (UTC+4)	Eln.Mammadov (yellow card) 51'; Abbasov 53' (yellow card) 58'; Huseynov (yellow card) 55'; Elk.Mammadov (yellow card) 55'; G.Aliyev (yellow card) 84'	Report	Kadiri 21'; Suleymanov 47', 87', 90+2'; Alizada (yellow card) 49'; Ahmadov (yellow card) 54'; O.Aliyev 65', 88'	Stadium: Dalga Arena; Attendance: 25; Referee: Rauf Jabarov

19 December 2023 Last 16	İrəvan	2–8	Araz-Naxçıvan	Baku
13:00 AZT (UTC+4)	Qanbarov 16'; Asgarov 37'; Muradbayli (yellow card) 79'	Report	Ngando 24', 43', 45+4' (pen.); O.Aliyev 25', 51'; Z.Aliyev (yellow card) 55'; Kuzmanović 73'; Mashike 80', 83'	Stadium: ASK Arena; Attendance: 70; Referee: Javid Jalilov

31 January 2024 Quarterfinal 1st leg	Araz-Naxçıvan	1–1	Gabala	Baku
16:00 AZT (UTC+4)	Mashike 45+1'; Wanderson (yellow card) 62'	Report	Tetteh 11'; Khalaila (yellow card) 29'; Mammadov (yellow card) 43'; Áfrico (red card) 77'	Stadium: Dalga Arena; Attendance: 180; Referee: Rauf Allahverdiyev

9 February 2024 Quarterfinal 2nd leg	Gabala	2–0 (3–1 agg.)	Araz-Naxçıvan	Qabala
16:00 AZT (UTC+4)	Akel (yellow card) 23'; Khalaila 39'; Abbasov 42'; Mammadov (yellow card) 90+2'; Atangana (yellow card) 90+3'	Report	Rodrigues (yellow card) 14'; Igor (yellow card) 16'; Kadiri (yellow card) 74'; Wanderson (yellow card) 90+5'	Stadium: City Stadium; Attendance: 200; Referee: İnqilab Mammadov

== Squad statistics ==
As of match played 26 May 2024

=== Appearances and goals ===
No.	Pos	Nat	Player	Total		Premier League		Azerbaijan Cup	
No.	Pos	Nat	Player	Apps	Goals	Apps	Goals	Apps	Goals
1	GK	(Azerbaijan) AZE	Vusal Shabanov	2	0	0	0	0+2	0
2	DF	(Azerbaijan) AZE	Abdulla Rzayev	28	1	27+1	1	0	0
3	DF	(Azerbaijan) AZE	Turan Manafov	36	3	32+1	3	2+1	0
4	DF	(Brazil) BRA	Igor Ribeiro	29	1	27+1	1	1	0
5	DF	(Azerbaijan) AZE	Nihad Gurbanli	1	0	0	0	1	0
6	MF	(Azerbaijan) AZE	Vadim Abdullayev	39	0	27+8	0	1+3	0
7	MF	(Azerbaijan) AZE	Nijat Suleymanov	27	3	5+19	0	1+2	3
8	FW	(Belgium) BEL	Ismail Azzaoui	30	2	12+14	2	0+4	0
9	FW	(Democratic Republic of the Congo) COD	Elvis Mashike	31	7	13+14	4	3+1	3
10	FW	(Azerbaijan) AZE	Orkhan Aliyev	36	13	22+10	9	1+3	4
11	MF	(Azerbaijan) AZE	Ramin Nasirli	12	0	2+9	0	0+1	0
12	GK	(Moldova) MDA	Cristian Avram	37	0	35	0	2	0
13	DF	(Azerbaijan) AZE	Mirali Ahmadov	1	0	0	0	1	0
14	FW	(Bosnia and Herzegovina) BIH	Mićo Kuzmanović	39	4	32+3	3	3+1	1
17	MF	(Azerbaijan) AZE	Ildar Alekperov	10	0	0+8	0	2	0
19	MF	(France) FRA	Axel Ngando	21	3	8+11	0	1+1	3
22	DF	(Azerbaijan) AZE	Elchin Mustafayev	22	0	8+10	0	4	0
23	MF	(Portugal) POR	Nuno Rodrigues	37	2	31+4	2	2	0
27	DF	(Bosnia and Herzegovina) BIH	Numan Kurdić	36	1	34	1	2	0
29	MF	(Brazil) BRA	Wanderson Maranhão	35	0	27+6	0	2	0
39	MF	(Azerbaijan) AZE	Tural Bayramli	32	0	17+13	0	2	0
42	MF	(Ghana) GHA	Mohammed Kadiri	35	4	25+6	3	4	1
55	DF	(Azerbaijan) AZE	Zamig Aliyev	21	0	11+7	0	3	0
88	MF	(Ukraine) UKR	Tugay Alizada	2	0	0	0	2	0
91	GK	(Bosnia and Herzegovina) BIH	Semir Bukvic	3	0	1	0	2	0
Players away on loan:
11	FW	(Azerbaijan) AZE	Bayramali Qurbanov	11	0	0+9	0	2	0
Players who left Araz-Naxçıvan during the season:

=== Goal scorers ===
Place	Position	Nation	Number	Name	Premier League	Azerbaijan Cup	Total
1	FW	(Azerbaijan)	10	Orkhan Aliyev	9	4	13
2	FW	(Democratic Republic of the Congo)	9	Elvis Mashike	4	3	7
3	MF	(Ghana)	42	Mohammed Kadiri	3	1	4
3	FW	(Bosnia and Herzegovina)	14	Mićo Kuzmanović	3	1	4
5	DF	(Azerbaijan)	3	Turan Manafov	3	0	3
5	MF	(Azerbaijan)	7	Nijat Suleymanov	0	3	3
5	MF	(France)	19	Axel Ngando	0	3	3
9	FW	(Belgium)	8	Ismail Azzaoui	2	0	2
9	MF	(Portugal)	23	Nuno Rodrigues	2	0	2
9				Own goal	2	0	2
12	DF	(Bosnia and Herzegovina)	27	Numan Kurdić	1	0	1
12	DF	(Brazil)	4	Igor Ribeiro	1	0	1
12	DF	(Azerbaijan)	2	Abdulla Rzayev	1	0	1
				TOTALS	31	15	46

=== Clean sheets ===
Place	Position	Nation	Number	Name	Premier League	Azerbaijan Cup	Total
1	GK	(Moldova)	12	Cristian Avram	7	0	7
				TOTALS	7	0	7

=== Disciplinary record ===
Number	Nation	Position	Name	Premier League		Azerbaijan Cup		Total	
Number	Nation	Position	Name	Yellow card	Red card	Yellow card	Red card	Yellow card	Red card
1	(Azerbaijan)	GK	Vusal Shabanov	0	1	0	0	0	1
2	(Azerbaijan)	DF	Abdulla Rzayev	4	0	0	0	4	0
3	(Azerbaijan)	DF	Turan Manafov	4	0	0	0	4	0
4	(Brazil)	DF	Igor Ribeiro	8	1	1	0	9	1
6	(Azerbaijan)	MF	Vadim Abdullayev	7	0	0	0	7	0
7	(Azerbaijan)	MF	Nijat Suleymanov	1	0	0	0	1	0
8	(Belgium)	FW	Ismail Azzaoui	3	0	0	0	3	0
9	(Democratic Republic of the Congo)	FW	Elvis Mashike	2	0	0	0	2	0
10	(Azerbaijan)	FW	Orkhan Aliyev	3	0	0	0	3	0
12	(Moldova)	GK	Cristian Avram	1	0	0	0	1	0
13	(Azerbaijan)	DF	Mirali Ahmadov	0	0	1	0	1	0
14	(Bosnia and Herzegovina)	FW	Mićo Kuzmanović	6	0	0	0	6	0
19	(France)	MF	Axel Ngando	1	0	0	0	1	0
22	(Azerbaijan)	DF	Elchin Mustafayev	2	0	0	0	2	0
23	(Portugal)	MF	Nuno Rodrigues	4	0	1	0	5	0
27	(Bosnia and Herzegovina)	DF	Numan Kurdić	4	1	0	0	4	1
29	(Brazil)	MF	Wanderson Maranhão	11	0	2	0	13	0
39	(Azerbaijan)	MF	Tural Bayramli	4	0	0	0	4	0
42	(Ghana)	MF	Mohammed Kadiri	9	0	1	0	10	0
55	(Azerbaijan)	DF	Zamig Aliyev	2	0	1	0	3	0
88	(Ukraine)	MF	Tugay Alizada	0	0	1	0	1	0
Players away on loan:
11	(Azerbaijan)	FW	Bayramali Qurbanov	1	0	0	0	1	0
Players who left Araz-Naxçıvan during the season:
			TOTALS	77	3	8	0	85	3
