= List of Azerbaijan football transfers summer 2024 =

This is a list of Azerbaijan football transfers in the summer transfer window, which takes place between 10 June and 1 September, by club. Only clubs of the 2024–25 Azerbaijan Premier League are included.

== Azerbaijan Premier League 2024-25 ==
=== Araz-Naxçıvan ===
In: Note: Flags indicate national team as defined under FIFA eligibility rules; some limited exceptions apply. Players may hold more than one non-FIFA nationality.

No.	Pos.	Nation	Player
2	DF	AZE	Slavik Alkhasov (from (Azerbaijan) Turan Tovuz)
3	DF	AZE	Bəxtiyar Həsənalızadə (from (Turkey) Tuzlaspor)
7	FW	AZE	Ulvi Isgandarov (from (Azerbaijan) Gabala)
8	MF	BRA	Jatobá (from (Romania) Politehnica Iași)
10	MF	POR	Benny (from (Portugal) Torreense)
16	FW	BRA	Ramon Machado (from (Malaysia) Sabah)
20	MF	AZE	Turan Valizade (from (Azerbaijan) Neftçi)
26	DF	AZE	Omar Buludov (from (Azerbaijan) Neftçi)
34	DF	AZE	Urfan Abbasov (from (Azerbaijan) Gabala)
94	GK	AZE	Tarlan Ahmadli (from (Azerbaijan) Turan Tovuz)
97	MF	BRA	Felipe Santos (from (Israel) Hapoel Haifa)

Out: Note: Flags indicate national team as defined under FIFA eligibility rules; some limited exceptions apply. Players may hold more than one non-FIFA nationality.

No.	Pos.	Nation	Player
2	DF	AZE	Abdulla Rzayev (loan return to (Azerbaijan) Sabah)
3	DF	AZE	Turan Manafov (to (Azerbaijan) Kapaz)
7	MF	AZE	Nijat Suleymanov (to (Azerbaijan) Kapaz)
8	MF	BEL	Ismail Azzaoui
9	FW	COD	Elvis Mashike (to (North Macedonia) Gostivari)
10	FW	AZE	Orkhan Aliyev (to (Azerbaijan) Kapaz)
17	MF	AZE	Ildar Alekperov (loan return to (Azerbaijan) Sabah)
19	MF	FRA	Axel Ngando
27	DF	BIH	Numan Kurdić (to (Lithuania) Kauno Žalgiris)
39	MF	AZE	Tural Bayramli (to (Azerbaijan) Turan Tovuz)
42	MF	GHA	Mohammed Kadiri (to (India) Mohammedan)
55	DF	AZE	Zamig Aliyev (to (Albania) Egnatia)
91	GK	BIH	Semir Bukvic

=== Kapaz ===
In: Note: Flags indicate national team as defined under FIFA eligibility rules; some limited exceptions apply. Players may hold more than one non-FIFA nationality.

No.	Pos.	Nation	Player
1	GK	POR	Rogerio (from (Portugal) Vilaverdense)
2	DF	AZE	Ilkin Qirtimov (from (Azerbaijan) Gabala)
5	DF	AZE	Rauf Huseynli (from (Azerbaijan) Gabala)
8	MF	AZE	Elmir Taghiyev (from (Azerbaijan) Sabail, previously on loan)
10	MF	MAR	Karim L'Koucha (from (Andorra) UE Santa Coloma)
11	FW	AZE	Orkhan Aliyev (from (Azerbaijan) Araz-Naxçıvan)
12	DF	AZE	Turan Manafov (from (Azerbaijan) Araz-Naxçıvan)
19	FW	MLI	Lassana N'Diaye (from (Bulgaria) Botev Vratsa)
22	GK	AZE	Mammad Huseynov (from (Azerbaijan) Zira)
26	MF	ANG	Paná (from (Azerbaijan) Sabail)
28	FW	ALB	Redon Mihana (from (Albania) Erzeni)
70	MF	AZE	Nijat Suleymanov (from (Azerbaijan) Araz-Naxçıvan)
77	MF	BRA	Victor Braga (from (Brazil) Águia de Marabá)
88	MF	BRA	Keverton Resende (from (Brazil) Hercílio Luz)

Out: Note: Flags indicate national team as defined under FIFA eligibility rules; some limited exceptions apply. Players may hold more than one non-FIFA nationality.

No.	Pos.	Nation	Player
4	DF	AZE	Vusal Masimov (to (Azerbaijan) Sabail)
9	MF	GEO	Mate Kvirkvia (to (Cyprus) Karmiotissa)
12	GK	AZE	Kamran Ibrahimov (to (Azerbaijan) Karvan)
14	DF	AZE	Elchin Alijanov (to (Azerbaijan) Zira)
21	MF	BRA	Martins Júnior (to (Azerbaijan) Zira)
22	DF	AZE	Rufat Ahmadov (loan return to (Azerbaijan) Gabala)
24	MF	NGA	Olawale Onanuga (to (Kuwait) Al-Nasr)
25	MF	GEO	Giorgi Papunashvili (to (Azerbaijan) Zira)
26	MF	MLI	Adama Niane
66	DF	AZE	Arzu Atakishiyev (on loan to (Azerbaijan) Difai Ağsu)
88	MF	AZE	Shakir Seyidov (loan return to (Azerbaijan) Sabah)
88	MF	BRA	Keverton Resende
91	MF	SEN	Latyr Fall (to (Indonesia) PSM Makassar)
96	GK	POR	Igor Rodrigues (to (Indonesia) Persita Tangerang)

=== Neftçi ===
In: Note: Flags indicate national team as defined under FIFA eligibility rules; some limited exceptions apply. Players may hold more than one non-FIFA nationality.

No.	Pos.	Nation	Player
6	MF	POR	Raphael Guzzo (from (Portugal) Chaves)
13	MF	AZE	Emil Safarov (from (Azerbaijan) Gabala)
14	MF	MNE	Edvin Kuč (from (Kosovo) Ballkani)
22	FW	GAM	Dembo Darboe (from (United Arab Emirates) Al-Nasr)
23	DF	GER	Robert Bauer (from (Saudi Arabia) Al-Tai)
24	DF	SEN	Moustapha Seck (from (Portugal) Portimonense)
30	GK	AZE	Rustam Samigullin (on loan from (Azerbaijan) Sabah)
88	MF	UKR	Andriy Shtohrin (from (Ukraine) Chornomorets)
90	FW	AZE	Ramil Sheydayev (from (Turkey) Kocaelispor)

Out: Note: Flags indicate national team as defined under FIFA eligibility rules; some limited exceptions apply. Players may hold more than one non-FIFA nationality.

No.	Pos.	Nation	Player
1	GK	CRO	Ivan Brkić (to (Poland) Motor Lublin)
6	MF	PAR	Mudo Valdez (to (Paraguay) Sol de América)
14	MF	AZE	Eddy Israfilov (to (Malaysia) Johor)
16	MF	ARG	Lucas Melano
22	FW	RUS	Reziuan Mirzov (to (Russia) Khimki)
23	MF	PLE	Ataa Jaber
26	DF	AZE	Omar Buludov (to (Azerbaijan) Araz-Naxçıvan)
28	MF	AZE	Turan Valizade (to (Azerbaijan) Araz-Naxçıvan)
30	GK	AZE	Agil Mammadov
82	DF	AZE	Rufat Abbasov (to (Azerbaijan) Shamakhi)

=== Qarabağ ===
In: Note: Flags indicate national team as defined under FIFA eligibility rules; some limited exceptions apply. Players may hold more than one non-FIFA nationality.

No.	Pos.	Nation	Player
1	GK	AZE	Shakhruddin Magomedaliyev (from (Turkey) Adana Demirspor)
11	FW	GHA	Emmanuel Addai (from (Spain) Alcorcón)
12	GK	AZE	Sadig Mammadzade (from (Azerbaijan) Sabail)
21	MF	UKR	Oleksiy Kashchuk (from (Ukraine) Shakhtar)
22	FW	AZE	Musa Qurbanlı (from (Sweden) Djurgarden)
97	GK	CRO	Fabijan Buntić (from (Portugal) Vizela)
99	GK	POL	Mateusz Kochalski (from (Poland) Stal Mielec)

Out: Note: Flags indicate national team as defined under FIFA eligibility rules; some limited exceptions apply. Players may hold more than one non-FIFA nationality.

No.	Pos.	Nation	Player
5	DF	AZE	Maksim Medvedev (retired)
11	FW	FRA	Adama Diakhaby (to (Turkey) Bandırmaspor)
17	FW	FRA	Hamidou Keyta (to (Turkey) Konyaspor)
23	GK	GEO	Luka Gugeshashvili (to (Greece) Panserraikos)
99	GK	RUS	Andrey Lunyov (to (Russia) Dynamo Moscow)
—	DF	AZE	Nihad Guliyev (to (Azerbaijan) Sabail)
—	MF	AZE	Ismayil Ibrahimli (loan extended to (Azerbaijan) Zira)
—	FW	AZE	Rustam Akhmedzade (loan extended to (Azerbaijan) Zira)

=== Sabah ===
In: Note: Flags indicate national team as defined under FIFA eligibility rules; some limited exceptions apply. Players may hold more than one non-FIFA nationality.

No.	Pos.	Nation	Player
11	MF	JAM	Kaheem Parris (from (Ukraine) Dynamo Kyiv, previously on loan)
13	MF	CRO	Ivan Lepinjica (from (Croatia) Slaven Belupo)
14	DF	BRA	Ygor Nogueira (from (Portugal) Chaves)
18	FW	SVK	Pavol Šafranko (from (Romania) Sepsi)
21	MF	AZE	Ildar Alekperov (loan return from (Azerbaijan) Araz-Naxçıvan)
20	MF	GER	Joy-Lance Mickels (from (Saudi Arabia) Al Faisaly)
22	DF	AZE	Abdulla Rzayev (loan return from (Azerbaijan) Araz-Naxçıvan)
33	FW	AZE	Jamal Jafarov (loan return from (Azerbaijan) Kapaz)
77	MF	AZE	Shakir Seyidov (loan return from (Azerbaijan) Kapaz)
99	FW	SRB	Njegoš Kupusović (from (Slovakia) Trenčín)

Out: Note: Flags indicate national team as defined under FIFA eligibility rules; some limited exceptions apply. Players may hold more than one non-FIFA nationality.

No.	Pos.	Nation	Player
11	MF	ESP	Cristian Ceballos
14	FW	ALG	Ishak Belfodil
15	MF	BRA	Christian (to (Azerbaijan) Turan Tovuz)
16	GK	AZE	Rustam Samigullin (on loan to (Azerbaijan) Neftçi)
18	FW	GEO	Davit Volkovi (to (Azerbaijan) Zira)
19	FW	NGA	Emmanuel Apeh
24	DF	MAR	Marouane Hadhoudi (to (Morocco) Difaâ Hassani)
27	MF	CUW	Jearl Margaritha
40	MF	AZE	Rauf Rustamli (on loan to (Azerbaijan) Shamakhi)
—	DF	AZE	Fakhri Mammadli (on loan to (Azerbaijan) Shamakhi)
—	MF	AZE	Veysal Rzayev (to (Azerbaijan) Turan Tovuz, previously on loan)

=== Sabail ===
In: Note: Flags indicate national team as defined under FIFA eligibility rules; some limited exceptions apply. Players may hold more than one non-FIFA nationality.

No.	Pos.	Nation	Player
3	DF	UKR	Dmytro Lytvyn (from (Portugal) Lusitânia)
5	MF	ISR	Gitay Sofir (from (Israel) Hapoel Acre)
8	MF	ESP	Gorka Larrucea (from (Bulgaria) Etar Veliko Tarnovo)
12	GK	AZE	Alirza Müshtabazada (from (Azerbaijan) Difai Ağsu)
15	DF	AZE	Vusal Masimov (from (Azerbaijan) Kapaz)
17	MF	AZE	Gülaga Asadov (from (Azerbaijan) İmişli)
20	DF	AZE	Mert Çelik (from (Turkey) Başakşehir)
44	DF	ALB	Amir Bilali (from (North Macedonia) Gostivari)
77	MF	AZE	Farid Nabiyev (from (Azerbaijan) Turan Tovuz)
83	DF	AZE	Nihad Guliyev (from (Azerbaijan) Qarabağ)

Out: Note: Flags indicate national team as defined under FIFA eligibility rules; some limited exceptions apply. Players may hold more than one non-FIFA nationality.

No.	Pos.	Nation	Player
1	GK	AZE	Salahat Agayev (to (Azerbaijan) Gabala)
3	DF	FRA	Sylvain Deslandes (to (Cyprus) PAC Omonia 29M)
4	DF	BIH	Adi Mehremić (to (Bosnia and Herzegovina) Velež Mostar)
5	DF	AZE	Adil Naghiyev (to (Azerbaijan) Shamakhi)
8	FW	AZE	Bahadur Haziyev (loan return to (Azerbaijan) Shamakhi)
10	FW	AZE	Aghabala Ramazanov (retired)
15	DF	AZE	Vugar Hasanov (to (Azerbaijan) Gabala)
17	MF	AZE	Rafael Maharramli (to (Azerbaijan) Shamakhi)
21	MF	NED	Anass Najah (to (Netherlands) De Graafschap)
27	MF	POR	Pedro Nuno (to (Poland) Korona Kielce)
55	MF	ISR	Nir Bardea (to (Romania) Sepsi OSK)
77	FW	KEN	Ayub Masika
88	MF	ANG	Paná (to (Azerbaijan) Kapaz)
—	MF	AZE	Elmir Taghiyev (to (Azerbaijan) Kapaz, previously on loan)

=== Shamakhi ===
In: Note: Flags indicate national team as defined under FIFA eligibility rules; some limited exceptions apply. Players may hold more than one non-FIFA nationality.

No.	Pos.	Nation	Player
1	GK	POR	Ricardo Fernandes (from (Portugal) Torreense)
4	DF	AZE	Adil Naghiyev (from (Azerbaijan) Sabail)
6	MF	AZE	Rauf Rustamli (on loan from (Azerbaijan) Sabah)
7	MF	GEO	Giorgi Kantaria (from (Lebanon) Nejmeh)
8	MF	AZE	Ilkin Muradov (from (Azerbaijan) Zira)
9	FW	ALB	Belajdi Pusi (from (Azerbaijan) Turan Tovuz)
11	FW	BEL	Jonathan Benteke (from (Luxembourg) Union Titus Pétange)
17	MF	AZE	Rafael Maharramli (from (Azerbaijan) Sabail)
19	DF	AZE	Fakhri Mammadli (on loan from (Azerbaijan) Sabah)
20	FW	GER	Leroy-Jacques Mickels (from (Saudi Arabia) Al-Taraji)
32	DF	MNE	Vasilije Radenović (from (Bosnia and Herzegovina) GOŠK Gabela)
66	DF	SRB	Vasilije Bakić (from (Serbia) Radnički Niš)
82	DF	AZE	Rufat Abbasov (from (Azerbaijan) Neftçi)
85	GK	AZE	Kamal Bayramov (from (Azerbaijan) Turan Tovuz)
93	MF	FRA	Brahim Konaté (from (Israel) Hapoel Afula)

Out: Note: Flags indicate national team as defined under FIFA eligibility rules; some limited exceptions apply. Players may hold more than one non-FIFA nationality.

No.	Pos.	Nation	Player
1	GK	AZE	Akpar Valiyev (to (Azerbaijan) Jabrayil)
4	DF	AZE	Kanan Quliyev
11	MF	AZE	Samir Maharramli (to (Azerbaijan) Jabrayil)
20	MF	AZE	Ali Mursalov
26	MF	AZE	Roman Huseynov
44	DF	AZE	Salman Alasgarov (to (Azerbaijan) Gabala)
70	MF	AZE	Bahruz Teymurov
74	DF	AZE	Suleyman Damadayev (to (Azerbaijan) Gabala)
77	DF	AZE	Ibrahim Aslanli
88	MF	AZE	Elchin Gasimov
99	FW	AZE	Calal Cabrayilov
—	DF	AZE	Fuad Bayramov (to (Azerbaijan) Zira, Previously on loan)
—	MF	AZE	Abil Abilov
—	MF	AZE	Bahadur Haziyev (on loan to (Azerbaijan) Imishli)

=== Sumgayit ===
In: Note: Flags indicate national team as defined under FIFA eligibility rules; some limited exceptions apply. Players may hold more than one non-FIFA nationality.

No.	Pos.	Nation	Player
2	DF	AZE	Sertan Taşqın (from (Turkey) Manisa)
3	DF	BIH	Slaviša Radović (from (Bosnia and Herzegovina) Sarajevo)
5	DF	BRA	Alan Dias (Free agent)
9	FW	MNE	Nikola Vujnović (from (Croatia) Gorica)
10	MF	AZE	Ragim Sadykhov (from (Azerbaijan) Zira)
11	MF	BRA	Fernando Medeiros (from (Albania) Egnatia)
95	DF	MNE	Miloš Milović (from (China) Qingdao Hainiu)
99	FW	LBR	Sylvanus Nimely (from (Uzbekistan) Surkhon Termez)

Out: Note: Flags indicate national team as defined under FIFA eligibility rules; some limited exceptions apply. Players may hold more than one non-FIFA nationality.

No.	Pos.	Nation	Player
3	DF	BIH	Slaviša Radović (to (Serbia) Radnički 1923)
9	FW	EST	Erik Sorga (to (Vietnam) Ho Chi Minh City)
10	FW	AZE	Kamran Aliyev (to (Russia) SKA-Khabarovsk)
11	FW	CHA	Casimir Ninga (to (Kuwait) Al-Tadamon SC)
12	DF	CIV	Abou Dosso
15	GK	AZE	Orkhan Sadigli
58	MF	BRA	Octávio (loan return to (Bulgaria) CSKA 1948)
71	MF	JPN	Masaki Murata (to (Denmark) Vejle)

=== Turan Tovuz ===
In: Note: Flags indicate national team as defined under FIFA eligibility rules; some limited exceptions apply. Players may hold more than one non-FIFA nationality.

No.	Pos.	Nation	Player
1	GK	RUS	Ivan Konovalov (from (Russia) Baltika Kaliningrad)
6	DF	IRN	Arash Ghaderi (from (Iran) Zob Ahan)
8	MF	AZE	Tural Bayramli (from (Azerbaijan) Araz-Naxçıvan)
9	MF	BRA	Christian (from (Azerbaijan) Sabah)
20	DF	AZE	Ibrahim Ramazanov (from (Azerbaijan) Gabala)
41	GK	RUS	Sergey Samok (from (Russia) KAMAZ)
44	DF	AZE	Rufat Ahmadov (from (Azerbaijan) Gabala)
99	MF	AZE	Veysal Rzayev (from (Azerbaijan) Sabah, previously on loan)

Out: Note: Flags indicate national team as defined under FIFA eligibility rules; some limited exceptions apply. Players may hold more than one non-FIFA nationality.

No.	Pos.	Nation	Player
1	GK	AZE	Tarlan Ahmadli (to (Azerbaijan) Araz-Naxçıvan)
3	DF	AZE	Tarlan Guliyev (to (Azerbaijan) Imishli)
6	DF	BRA	Brunão (to (Brazil) Guarani)
7	FW	BRA	Luiz Pachu
9	FW	ALB	Belajdi Pusi (to (Azerbaijan) Shamakhi)
13	GK	AZE	Aydın Bayramov (to (Azerbaijan) Zira)
14	DF	AZE	Slavik Alkhasov (to (Azerbaijan) Araz-Naxçıvan)
77	MF	AZE	Farid Nabiyev (to (Azerbaijan) Sabail)
85	GK	AZE	Kamal Bayramov (to (Azerbaijan) Shamakhi)

=== Zira ===
In: Note: Flags indicate national team as defined under FIFA eligibility rules; some limited exceptions apply. Players may hold more than one non-FIFA nationality.

No.	Pos.	Nation	Player
3	DF	RWA	Ange Mutsinzi (from (Norway) Jerv)
8	MF	AZE	Ismayil Ibrahimli (loan extended from (Azerbaijan) Qarabağ)
10	MF	GEO	Giorgi Papunashvili (from (Azerbaijan) Kapaz)
18	MF	BRA	Martins Júnior (from (Azerbaijan) Kapaz)
11	FW	AZE	Rustam Akhmedzade (loan extended from (Azerbaijan) Qarabağ)
13	GK	AZE	Aydın Bayramov (from (Azerbaijan) Turan Tovuz)
14	DF	AZE	Elchin Alijanov (from (Azerbaijan) Kapaz)
16	MF	AZE	Fuad Bayramov (from (Azerbaijan) Shamakhi, previously on loan)
17	MF	FRA	Iron Gomis (from (Turkey) Kasımpaşa)
90	FW	GEO	Davit Volkovi (from (Azerbaijan) Sabah)

Out: Note: Flags indicate national team as defined under FIFA eligibility rules; some limited exceptions apply. Players may hold more than one non-FIFA nationality.

No.	Pos.	Nation	Player
8	MF	AZE	Ilkin Muradov (to (Azerbaijan) Shamakhi)
9	FW	UKR	Vladyslav Kulach (to (Armenia) Pyunik)
10	FW	AZE	Ragim Sadykhov (to (Azerbaijan) Sumgayit)
17	MF	AZE	Araz Abdullayev
22	GK	AZE	Mammad Hüseynov (to (Azerbaijan) Kapaz)
24	MF	PAR	César Meza Colli
44	DF	GRE	Dimitrios Chantakias (to (Greece) Panserraikos)
