= List of Azerbaijan football transfers summer 2025 =

This is a list of Azerbaijan football transfers in the summer transfer window, which takes place between 10 June and 1 September, by club. Only clubs of the 2025–26 Azerbaijan Premier League are included.

== Azerbaijan Premier League 2025-26 ==
=== Araz-Naxçıvan ===
In: Note: Flags indicate national team as defined under FIFA eligibility rules; some limited exceptions apply. Players may hold more than one non-FIFA nationality.

No.	Pos.	Nation	Player
6	MF	CPV	Patrick Andrade (from (Azerbaijan) Qarabağ)
7	MF	FRA	Hamidou Keyta (from (Turkey) Konyaspor)
8	MF	AZE	Coşqun Diniyev (from (Turkey) Çorum)
11	FW	GER	Ba-Muaka Simakala (from (Germany) VfL Osnabrück)
19	MF	ISR	Bar Cohen (from (Israel) Maccabi Netanya)
44	DF	AZE	Rahil Mammadov (from (Poland) Radomiak Radom)
77	DF	BRA	Bruno Franco (from (Bulgaria) Lokomotiv Sofia)
70	MF	FRA	Charles Boli (from (Cyprus) Apollon Limassol)

Out: Note: Flags indicate national team as defined under FIFA eligibility rules; some limited exceptions apply. Players may hold more than one non-FIFA nationality.

No.	Pos.	Nation	Player
1	GK	AZE	Vusal Shabanov (to (Azerbaijan) Sabail)
4	DF	BRA	Igor Ribeiro (to (Azerbaijan) Neftçi)
6	MF	AZE	Vadim Abdullayev (to (Azerbaijan) Karvan)
8	MF	BRA	Jatobá (to (South Korea) Daegu)
10	MF	POR	Benny
11	FW	AZE	Bayramali Qurbanov (to (Azerbaijan) Difai Ağsu)
14	FW	BIH	Mićo Kuzmanović
20	MF	AZE	Turan Valizade (to (Azerbaijan) Sabail)
21	MF	PAR	César Meza Colli
88	MF	UKR	Tuhay Alizade (to (Azerbaijan) Sabail)

=== Gabala ===
In: Note: Flags indicate national team as defined under FIFA eligibility rules; some limited exceptions apply. Players may hold more than one non-FIFA nationality.

No.	Pos.	Nation	Player
3	DF	BRA	Eduardo Kunde (from (Indonesia) Persis Solo)
6	MF	ESP	Jaime Sierra (from (Croatia) NK Varaždin)
12	FW	FRA	Ibrahim Sangaré (from (Israel) Hapoel Hadera)
16	DF	GHA	Isaac Amoah (from (Spain) Atlético Sanluqueño)
30	FW	GHA	Prince Owusu (promoted from U19)
50	MF	CIV	Adriel Ba Loua (from (France) Caen)
70	FW	ANG	Paulo Guimbila (from (Bahrain) Al Ahli)
—	MF	NGA	Salihu Nasiru (from (Nigeria) El-Kanemi Warriors)

Out: Note: Flags indicate national team as defined under FIFA eligibility rules; some limited exceptions apply. Players may hold more than one non-FIFA nationality.

No.	Pos.	Nation	Player
5	DF	AZE	Samir Hasanov (to (Russia) Rubin-2 Kazan)
6	MF	AZE	Emil Süleymanov (on loan to (Azerbaijan) Shamakhi)
8	MF	AZE	Urfan Ismayilov
9	FW	AZE	Ruslan Voronsov
12	GK	AZE	Mushfiq Nadirov
19	FW	NGA	Abdullahi Shuaibu (to (Azerbaijan) Shamakhi)
20	FW	NGA	Oche Ochowechi (loan return to (Ukraine) Kryvbas Kryvyi Rih)
25	DF	AZE	Ibrahim Ramazanov (loan return to (Azerbaijan) Turan Tovuz)
32	DF	AZE	Elvin Yunuszade (to (Azerbaijan) Karvan)
71	FW	AZE	Sanan Agalarov (on loan to (Azerbaijan) Baku Sporting, previously on loan to (Azerbaijan) Araz-Naxçıvan)

=== Imishli ===
In: Note: Flags indicate national team as defined under FIFA eligibility rules; some limited exceptions apply. Players may hold more than one non-FIFA nationality.

No.	Pos.	Nation	Player
1	GK	AZE	Huseynali Guliyev (from (Azerbaijan) Sabail)
10	FW	SRB	Nikola Karaklajić (from (Serbia) Napredak Kruševac)
14	DF	BRA	Ronaldo Rodrigues (from (Indonesia) Borneo)
17	MF	GHA	Ezekiel Morgan (from (Azerbaijan) Karvan)
19	DF	AZE	Azər Salahlı (from (Azerbaijan) Neftçi)
22	FW	AZE	Ibrahim Aliyev (from (Azerbaijan) MOIK Baku)
94	DF	BRA	Rafael Viegas (from (Portugal) São João de Ver)
99	GK	AZE	Imam Ali (from (Azerbaijan) Neftçi U-19)

Out: Note: Flags indicate national team as defined under FIFA eligibility rules; some limited exceptions apply. Players may hold more than one non-FIFA nationality.

No.	Pos.	Nation	Player
4	DF	BRA	Guilherme Silva
6	MF	AZE	Khayal Tomarov
7	FW	BRA	Pablo Henrique
8	MF	AZE	Tolgar Yagubov
9	FW	AZE	Khalil Bashirov
10	FW	NGA	Timilehin Oluwaseun (loan return to (Azerbaijan) Sabah)
11	MF	AZE	Seykhan Farajov
17	MF	AZE	Firaddin Abdullayev
19	GK	AZE	Fazil Hasanzade
30	MF	AZE	Nabi Mammadov
32	DF	AZE	Rahim Jafarli
36	GK	AZE	Elmaddin Sultanov
99	MF	AZE	Javidan Gasimli

=== Karvan ===
In: Note: Flags indicate national team as defined under FIFA eligibility rules; some limited exceptions apply. Players may hold more than one non-FIFA nationality.

No.	Pos.	Nation	Player
4	DF	NGA	Olawale Doyeni (from (Nigeria) Plateau United)
6	MF	AZE	Vadim Abdullayev (from (Azerbaijan) Araz-Naxçıvan)
7	MF	AZE	Araz Abdullayev (from (Azerbaijan) Qaradağ Lökbatan)
10	FW	SRI	Sam Durrant (from (Wales) Connah's Quay Nomads)
11	MF	SCO	Kyle Spence (from (Northern Ireland) Coleraine)
13	MF	AZE	Vusal Masimov (from (Azerbaijan) Shamakhi)
18	DF	AZE	Suleyman Ahmadov (from (Azerbaijan) Sabail)
19	MF	NGA	Gavi Thompson (from (Nigeria) Sporting Lagos)
32	DF	AZE	Elvin Yunuszade (from (Azerbaijan) Gabala)
33	DF	AZE	Eltun Turabov (from (Azerbaijan) Turan Tovuz)
37	DF	COD	Moise Ngwisani (from (Luxembourg) Wiltz 71)
—	FW	BRA	David Oliveira (from (Malta) Żabbar St. Patrick)

Out: Note: Flags indicate national team as defined under FIFA eligibility rules; some limited exceptions apply. Players may hold more than one non-FIFA nationality.

No.	Pos.	Nation	Player
3	DF	AZE	Izzat Mushtagov
5	DF	AZE	Peyman Keshavarzi
7	FW	AZE	Bahruz Teymurov
9	FW	AZE	Ilham Huseynov
17	MF	GHA	Ezekiel Morgan (to (Azerbaijan) Imishli)
18	MF	AZE	Elvin Ismayilov
20	MF	AZE	Roman Huseynov
22	DF	IRN	Aref Mohammadalipour
23	DF	UZB	Begzod Khulikulov
62	GK	AZE	Mammad Muradov
77	MF	AZE	Mushfig Teymurov
97	FW	AZE	Emil Gasimov (to (Azerbaijan) Sabail)

=== Kapaz ===
In: Note: Flags indicate national team as defined under FIFA eligibility rules; some limited exceptions apply. Players may hold more than one non-FIFA nationality.

No.	Pos.	Nation	Player
1	GK	POL	Kacper Rosa (from (Poland) Motor Lublin)
27	DF	AZE	Magsad Isayev (from (Azerbaijan) Zira)
14	DF	BFA	Adama Fofana (from (Turkey) Adanaspor)
6	DF	POR	Pedro Gomes (from (Portugal) Boavista)
77	MF	AZE	Farid Nabiyev (from (Azerbaijan) Sabail)
88	MF	AZE	Şakir Seyidov (from (Azerbaijan) Sabah)
19	MF	GEO	Otar Aptsiauri (from (Georgia (country)) Dinamo Tbilisi)

Out: Note: Flags indicate national team as defined under FIFA eligibility rules; some limited exceptions apply. Players may hold more than one non-FIFA nationality.

No.	Pos.	Nation	Player
5	DF	AZE	Rauf Hüseynli
6	DF	AZE	Nemat Musayev (to (Azerbaijan) Difai Agsu)
11	FW	MLT	Trent Buhagiar (to (Singapore) Tampines Rovers)
12	DF	AZE	Turan Manafov (to (South Africa) Stellenbosch)
21	MF	AZE	Jamal Jafarov (loan return to (Azerbaijan) Sabah)
70	MF	AZE	Nicat Süleymanov (to (Azerbaijan) Sabail)
78	DF	BLR	Yegor Khvalko (to (Kazakhstan) Tobol)
88	MF	TJK	Shervoni Mabatshoyev (to (Tajikistan) Regar-TadAZ)

=== Neftçi ===
In: Note: Flags indicate national team as defined under FIFA eligibility rules; some limited exceptions apply. Players may hold more than one non-FIFA nationality.

No.	Pos.	Nation	Player
5	DF	BRA	Igor Ribeiro (from (Azerbaijan) Araz-Naxçıvan)
6	MF	BEN	Sessi D'Almeida (from (Cyprus) Apollon Limassol)
10	MF	VEN	Freddy Vargas (on loan from (Israel) Maccabi Netanya)
11	MF	FRA	Imad Faraj (from (Cyprus) AEK Larnaca)
13	GK	BIH	Kenan Pirić (from (Turkey) Antalyaspor)
15	DF	AZE	Elvin Badalov (from (Azerbaijan) Sumgayit)
17	MF	AZE	Murad Khachayev (from (Azerbaijan) Sumgayit)
22	MF	PAR	Luis Ortíz (on loan from (Paraguay) Sportivo Ameliano)
23	MF	ECU	Jordan Rezabala (from (Mexico) Dorados)
27	DF	ROU	Cristian Costin (from (Romania) Dinamo București)
28	FW	LUX	Alessio Curci (from (Belgium) Francs Borains)
77	DF	MLI	Falaye Sacko (from (France) Montpellier)

Out: Note: Flags indicate national team as defined under FIFA eligibility rules; some limited exceptions apply. Players may hold more than one non-FIFA nationality.

No.	Pos.	Nation	Player
3	DF	AZE	Hojjat Haghverdi (to (Azerbaijan) Sumgayit)
6	MF	POR	Raphael Guzzo (to (Portugal) Marítimo)
7	MF	AZE	Azer Aliyev (to (Russia) Yenisey)
10	MF	AZE	Filip Ozobić (to (Azerbaijan) Turan Tovuz)
17	MF	AZE	Rahman Hajiyev (to (Azerbaijan) Sabail)
19	DF	AZE	Azər Salahlı (to (Azerbaijan) Imishli)
20	MF	SLE	Alpha Conteh (to (Iceland) Stjarnan)
21	MF	AZE	İsmayıl Zülfüqarlı (to (Azerbaijan) Shafa Baku, previously on loan to (Azerbaijan) Turan Tovuz)
22	FW	GAM	Dembo Darboe (to (Libya) Al Ahli)
23	DF	GER	Robert Bauer (to (Thailand) Buriram United)
30	GK	AZE	Rustam Samigullin (loan return to (Azerbaijan) Sabah)
44	DF	BRA	Yuri Matias (to (United Arab Emirates) Ajman Club)
71	MF	JPN	Ryonosuke Ohori (on loan to (Azerbaijan) Kapaz)
77	FW	BLR	Yegor Bogomolsky (to (Azerbaijan) Zira)
99	DF	CIV	Erwin Koffi (to (France) Guingamp)

=== Qarabağ ===
In: Note: Flags indicate national team as defined under FIFA eligibility rules; some limited exceptions apply. Players may hold more than one non-FIFA nationality.

No.	Pos.	Nation	Player
3	DF	MAR	Samy Mmaee (on loan from (Croatia) Dinamo Zagreb)
6	MF	CIV	Chris Kouakou (from (Portugal) Mafra)
9	MF	ESP	Joni Montiel (from (Spain) Rayo Vallecano)
17	FW	COL	Camilo Durán (from (Portugal) Portimonense)
18	DF	BRA	Dani Bolt (from (Portugal) Torreense)
35	MF	BRA	Pedro Bicalho (from (Brazil) Palmeiras)

Out: Note: Flags indicate national team as defined under FIFA eligibility rules; some limited exceptions apply. Players may hold more than one non-FIFA nationality.

No.	Pos.	Nation	Player
7	MF	ALG	Yassine Benzia (to (Saudi Arabia) Al-Fayha)
12	GK	AZE	Sadig Mammadzade (on loan to (Azerbaijan) Difai Ağsu)
17	FW	AZE	Rustam Akhmedzade (to (Azerbaijan) Sumgayit, previously on loan to (Azerbaijan) Zira)
19	FW	ALB	Redon Xhixha (to (Algeria) CR Belouizdad)
29	DF	MNE	Marko Vešović (to (Croatia) Lokomotiva Zagreb)
66	MF	CPV	Patrick Andrade (to (Azerbaijan) Araz-Naxçıvan)
—	MF	AZE	İsmayıl İbrahimli (to (Azerbaijan) Zira, previously on loan)

=== Sabah ===
In: Note: Flags indicate national team as defined under FIFA eligibility rules; some limited exceptions apply. Players may hold more than one non-FIFA nationality.

No.	Pos.	Nation	Player
3	DF	GLP	Steve Solvet (from (France) Martigues)
21	MF	SRB	Veljko Simić (on loan from (Turkey) Sivasspor)
22	MF	FRA	Zinédine Ould Khaled (from (France) Angers)
23	FW	AZE	Jamal Jafarov (loan return from (Azerbaijan) Kapaz)
53	DF	BRA	Andrey Santos (from (Brazil) Canaã)
72	GK	AZE	Rustam Samigullin (loan return from (Azerbaijan) Neftçi)
80	DF	ALG	Akim Zedadka (from (Poland) Piast Gliwice)
—	FW	NGA	Timilehin Oluwaseun (loan return from (Azerbaijan) Imishli)

Out: Note: Flags indicate national team as defined under FIFA eligibility rules; some limited exceptions apply. Players may hold more than one non-FIFA nationality.

No.	Pos.	Nation	Player
1	GK	AZE	Yusif İmanov (to (Kosovo) Malisheva)
3	DF	MAS	Jon Irazabal (to (Malaysia) Johor Darul)
4	DF	MAR	Sofian Chakla (to (Greece) AE Larissa)
10	MF	AZE	Namiq Ələsgərov (to (Azerbaijan) Zira)
12	MF	LUX	Vincent Thill (to (Azerbaijan) Zira)
24	MF	AZE	Rauf Rustamli (on loan to (Azerbaijan) Sumgayit)
77	MF	AZE	Şakir Seyidov (to (Azerbaijan) Kapaz)
—	DF	AZE	Abdulla Rzayev (on loan to (Azerbaijan) Turan Tovuz)

=== Shamakhi ===
In: Note: Flags indicate national team as defined under FIFA eligibility rules; some limited exceptions apply. Players may hold more than one non-FIFA nationality.

No.	Pos.	Nation	Player
4	DF	BRA	Cézar (from (Brazil) Caxias)
6	DF	BRA	António Lara (from (Qatar) Al Bidda)
9	FW	SUI	Karim Rossi (from (Switzerland) Schaffhausen)
11	FW	POR	Diogo Balau (from (Portugal) U.D. Santarém)
13	FW	POR	Ricardo Apolinario (from (Portugal) U.D. Santarém)
14	DF	AZE	Ravil Qafarov (from (Azerbaijan) Jabrayil)
19	FW	NGA	Abdullahi Shuaibu (from (Azerbaijan) Gabala)
21	DF	AZE	Bilal Ismayilov (from (Azerbaijan) Jabrayil)
24	DF	AZE	Sanan Muradly (on loan from (Azerbaijan) Sumgayit)
27	MF	AZE	Emil Süleymanov (on loan from (Azerbaijan) Gabala)
44	DF	BRA	David Santos (from (Portugal) SC Covilhã)
80	MF	AZE	Habib Ismayilov (from (Azerbaijan) Neftçi)
97	MF	AZE	Oruj Mammadov (from (Azerbaijan) Sabail)

Out: Note: Flags indicate national team as defined under FIFA eligibility rules; some limited exceptions apply. Players may hold more than one non-FIFA nationality.

No.	Pos.	Nation	Player
12	FW	BRA	Michael Thuíque
20	FW	GER	Leroy-Jacques Mickels (to (Azerbaijan) Zira)
23	MF	AZE	Murad Valiyev
32	DF	MNE	Vasilije Radenović (to (Lithuania) Žalgiris)
60	MF	AZE	Sabayil Bagirov (to (Azerbaijan) Sabail)
66	DF	SRB	Vasilije Bakić (to (Finland) Ilves)
93	MF	FRA	Brahim Konaté (to (Azerbaijan) Zira)
—	GK	AZE	Sahib Hasanov (released, previously on loan to (Azerbaijan) Difai Agsu)

=== Sumgayit ===
In: Note: Flags indicate national team as defined under FIFA eligibility rules; some limited exceptions apply. Players may hold more than one non-FIFA nationality.

No.	Pos.	Nation	Player
3	DF	AZE	Hojjat Haghverdi (from (Azerbaijan) Neftçi)
6	MF	AZE	Rauf Rustamli (on loan from (Azerbaijan) Sabah)
7	FW	AZE	Rustam Akhmedzade (from (Azerbaijan) Qarabağ)
9	FW	MAD	Alexandre Ramalingom (from (Israel) Bnei Sakhnin)
10	MF	SRB	Nikola Ninković (from (Serbia) Tekstilac Odžaci)
11	FW	SRB	Aleksa Janković (from (Serbia) Radnički 1923)
14	DF	POR	Pedro Pinto (from (Angola) Petro de Luanda)
72	DF	FRA	Rayan Senhadji (from (Russia) Fakel Voronezh)

Out: Note: Flags indicate national team as defined under FIFA eligibility rules; some limited exceptions apply. Players may hold more than one non-FIFA nationality.

No.	Pos.	Nation	Player
2	DF	AZE	Sertan Taşqın (to (Turkey) Serik Belediyespor)
5	DF	BRA	Alan Dias (to (Kazakhstan) Ordabasy)
7	MF	AZE	Rövlan Muradov (to (Azerbaijan) Zira)
9	FW	UZB	Bobur Abdikholikov (to (Uzbekistan) Pakhtakor)
11	FW	MLI	Momo Yansané (to (Cyprus) Omonia Aradippou)
12	MF	GEO	Giorgi Kharaishvili (to (Georgia (country)) Dinamo Tbilisi)
14	DF	AZE	Elvin Badalov (to (Azerbaijan) Neftçi)
17	DF	AZE	Murad Khachayev (to (Azerbaijan) Neftçi)
41	FW	AZE	Ugur Jahangirov
77	MF	UZB	Jasurbek Jaloliddinov (to (Uzbekistan) Sogdiana)
95	DF	MNE	Miloš Milović
99	FW	LBR	Sylvanus Nimely (to (Uzbekistan) Neftchi Fergana)

=== Turan Tovuz ===
In: Note: Flags indicate national team as defined under FIFA eligibility rules; some limited exceptions apply. Players may hold more than one non-FIFA nationality.

No.	Pos.	Nation	Player
1	GK	TJK	Oleg Baklov (from (Russia) Ufa)
2	DF	AZE	Abdulla Rzayev (on loan from (Azerbaijan) Sabah)
3	DF	BRA	Henrique Silva (from (Spain) Real Valladolid)
8	MF	CPV	David Tavares (from (Romania) Gloria Buzău)
19	MF	ESP	Roberto Olabe (from (Spain) Ibiza)
26	MF	AZE	Filip Ozobić (from (Azerbaijan) Neftçi)
99	FW	SEN	Ibrahima Wadji (from (France) Saint-Étienne)

Out: Note: Flags indicate national team as defined under FIFA eligibility rules; some limited exceptions apply. Players may hold more than one non-FIFA nationality.

No.	Pos.	Nation	Player
1	GK	RUS	Ivan Konovalov (to (Belarus) Dinamo Minsk)
6	DF	IRN	Arash Ghaderi (to (Iran) Zob Ahan Esfahan)
7	MF	AZE	İsmayıl Zülfüqarlı (loan return to (Azerbaijan) Neftçi)
9	MF	BRA	Christian
19	FW	AZE	Orkhan Aliyev (to (Kyrgyzstan) Uzgen)
29	MF	RUS	Anton Krachkovsky (loan return to (Russia) Dynamo Makhachkala)
33	DF	AZE	Eltun Turabov (to (Azerbaijan) Karvan)
39	DF	AZE	Sadiq Quliyev (to (Azerbaijan) Sabail)
40	DF	BRA	Kauan

=== Zira ===
In: Note: Flags indicate national team as defined under FIFA eligibility rules; some limited exceptions apply. Players may hold more than one non-FIFA nationality.

No.	Pos.	Nation	Player
7	MF	AZE	Rövlan Muradov (from (Azerbaijan) Sumgayit)
8	MF	AZE	İsmayıl İbrahimli (from (Azerbaijan) Qarabağ, previously on loan)
12	MF	LUX	Vincent Thill (from (Azerbaijan) Sabah)
28	FW	GER	Leroy-Jacques Mickels (from (Azerbaijan) Shamakhi)
70	MF	AZE	Namiq Ələsgərov (from (Azerbaijan) Sabah)
77	FW	BLR	Yegor Bogomolsky (from (Azerbaijan) Neftçi)
87	MF	TOG	Abdoul Aziz Batibie (from (Togo) Pumas FC d'Ablogamé)
93	MF	FRA	Brahim Konaté (from (Azerbaijan) Shamakhi)

Out: Note: Flags indicate national team as defined under FIFA eligibility rules; some limited exceptions apply. Players may hold more than one non-FIFA nationality.

No.	Pos.	Nation	Player
7	DF	AZE	Magsad Isayev (to (Azerbaijan) Kapaz)
11	FW	AZE	Rustam Akhmedzade (loan return to (Azerbaijan) Qarabağ)
15	MF	CIV	Pierre Zebli
19	MF	GUI	Salifou Soumah (to (Sweden) Malmö)
23	FW	BRA	Raphael Utzig (on loan to (Vietnam) Cong An Ho Chi Minh City)
24	MF	NGA	Yusuf Lawal (to (Iraq) Al-Karkh)
