= List of Azerbaijan football transfers winter 2025–26 =

This is a list of Azerbaijan football transfers in the winter transfer window, by club. Only clubs of the 2025–26 Azerbaijan Premier League are included.

== Azerbaijan Premier League 2025-26 ==
=== Araz-Naxçıvan ===
In: Note: Flags indicate national team as defined under FIFA eligibility rules; some limited exceptions apply. Players may hold more than one non-FIFA nationality.

No.	Pos.	Nation	Player

Out: Note: Flags indicate national team as defined under FIFA eligibility rules; some limited exceptions apply. Players may hold more than one non-FIFA nationality.

No.	Pos.	Nation	Player
2	MF	AZE	Qara Qarayev
22	DF	AZE	Elçin Mustafayev

=== Gabala ===
In: Note: Flags indicate national team as defined under FIFA eligibility rules; some limited exceptions apply. Players may hold more than one non-FIFA nationality.

No.	Pos.	Nation	Player
7	DF	AZE	Turan Manafov (on loan from (South Africa) Stellenbosch)
8	DF	FRA	Sambou Sissoko (on loan from (France) Valenciennes)
24	FW	NGA	Ismahil Akinade (from (Uzbekistan) Andijon)
33	DF	SEN	Seydina Keita (from (Lithuania) Panevėžys)
93	GK	AZE	Rza Jafarov (on loan from (Azerbaijan) Neftçi)

Out: Note: Flags indicate national team as defined under FIFA eligibility rules; some limited exceptions apply. Players may hold more than one non-FIFA nationality.

No.	Pos.	Nation	Player
42	MF	CMR	Jeando Fuchs
97	FW	AZE	Elshad Taghiyev

=== Imishli ===
In: Note: Flags indicate national team as defined under FIFA eligibility rules; some limited exceptions apply. Players may hold more than one non-FIFA nationality.

No.	Pos.	Nation	Player

Out: Note: Flags indicate national team as defined under FIFA eligibility rules; some limited exceptions apply. Players may hold more than one non-FIFA nationality.

No.	Pos.	Nation	Player
22	FW	AZE	Ibrahim Aliyev

=== Karvan ===
In: Note: Flags indicate national team as defined under FIFA eligibility rules; some limited exceptions apply. Players may hold more than one non-FIFA nationality.

No.	Pos.	Nation	Player
5	DF	AZE	Emin Rüstəmov (on loan from (Azerbaijan) Sabail)
17	FW	AZE	Samir Abdullayev (from (Azerbaijan) Mingəçevir)
—	MF	AZE	Rauf Rustamli (on loan from (Azerbaijan) Sabah)

Out: Note: Flags indicate national team as defined under FIFA eligibility rules; some limited exceptions apply. Players may hold more than one non-FIFA nationality.

No.	Pos.	Nation	Player
3	DF	IRN	Saeed Irankhah

=== Kapaz ===
In: Note: Flags indicate national team as defined under FIFA eligibility rules; some limited exceptions apply. Players may hold more than one non-FIFA nationality.

No.	Pos.	Nation	Player
4	DF	GEO	Mate Abuladze (from (Georgia (country)) Samgurali Tskaltubo)
8	MF	AZE	Veysal Rzayev (from (Azerbaijan) Turan Tovuz)
11	MF	AZE	Rahman Hajiyev (from (Azerbaijan) Sabail)

Out: Note: Flags indicate national team as defined under FIFA eligibility rules; some limited exceptions apply. Players may hold more than one non-FIFA nationality.

No.	Pos.	Nation	Player
1	GK	POL	Kacper Rosa
6	DF	POR	Pedro Gomes (to (Spain) Valencia Mestalla)
11	FW	BRA	Vitor Feijão (to (Brazil) Caxias)
15	DF	AZE	Raul Mammadov
19	MF	GEO	Otar Aptsiauri (loan return to (Georgia (country)) Dinamo Tbilisi)

=== Neftçi ===
In: Note: Flags indicate national team as defined under FIFA eligibility rules; some limited exceptions apply. Players may hold more than one non-FIFA nationality.

No.	Pos.	Nation	Player
—	FW	BRA	Breno Almeida (from (Cyprus) Ethnikos Achna)

Out: Note: Flags indicate national team as defined under FIFA eligibility rules; some limited exceptions apply. Players may hold more than one non-FIFA nationality.

No.	Pos.	Nation	Player
11	FW	BRA	Alex Fernandes (loan return to (Russia) Baltika Kaliningrad)
93	GK	AZE	Rza Jafarov (on loan to (Azerbaijan) Gabala)

=== Qarabağ ===
In: Note: Flags indicate national team as defined under FIFA eligibility rules; some limited exceptions apply. Players may hold more than one non-FIFA nationality.

No.	Pos.	Nation	Player
24	DF	FRA	Jérémie Gnali (to (Cyprus) AEK Larnaca)

Out: Note: Flags indicate national team as defined under FIFA eligibility rules; some limited exceptions apply. Players may hold more than one non-FIFA nationality.

No.	Pos.	Nation	Player
7	FW	AZE	Nariman Akhundzade (to (United States) Columbus Crew)

=== Sabah ===
In: Note: Flags indicate national team as defined under FIFA eligibility rules; some limited exceptions apply. Players may hold more than one non-FIFA nationality.

No.	Pos.	Nation	Player
19	MF	FRA	Aaron Malouda (from (France) Lille, previously on loan)
33	MF	UZB	Umarali Rakhmonaliev (from (Russia) Rubin Kazan, previously on loan)
99	FW	GAB	Orphé Mbina (on loan from (Slovenia) Maribor)

Out: Note: Flags indicate national team as defined under FIFA eligibility rules; some limited exceptions apply. Players may hold more than one non-FIFA nationality.

No.	Pos.	Nation	Player
7	DF	BIH	Bojan Letić (to (Bosnia and Herzegovina) Sloga Doboj)
8	MF	RUS	Ayaz Guliyev (to (Russia) Arsenal Tula)
10	MF	AZE	Anatoliy Nuriyev (to (Azerbaijan) Zira)
72	GK	AZE	Rustam Samigullin
99	FW	SRB	Njegoš Kupusović (to (Bosnia and Herzegovina) Radnik Bijeljina)
—	DF	AZE	Abdulla Rzayev (loan return from (Azerbaijan) Turan Tovuz)
—	MF	AZE	Rauf Rustamli (on loan to (Azerbaijan) Karvan, previously on loan to (Azerbaijan) Sumgayit)
—	FW	AZE	Jamal Jafarov (to (Azerbaijan) Kapaz)

=== Shamakhi ===
In: Note: Flags indicate national team as defined under FIFA eligibility rules; some limited exceptions apply. Players may hold more than one non-FIFA nationality.

No.	Pos.	Nation	Player

Out: Note: Flags indicate national team as defined under FIFA eligibility rules; some limited exceptions apply. Players may hold more than one non-FIFA nationality.

No.	Pos.	Nation	Player
6	MF	BRA	António Lara (to (Malta) Floriana)

=== Sumgayit ===
In: Note: Flags indicate national team as defined under FIFA eligibility rules; some limited exceptions apply. Players may hold more than one non-FIFA nationality.

No.	Pos.	Nation	Player
29	MF	AZE	Emil Mustafayev (on loan from (Ukraine) Polissya Zhytomyr)
33	DF	UKR	Danylo Beskorovaynyi (from (Ukraine) Polissya Zhytomyr)
—	MF	BFA	Cedric Badolo (from (Slovakia) Spartak Trnava)

Out: Note: Flags indicate national team as defined under FIFA eligibility rules; some limited exceptions apply. Players may hold more than one non-FIFA nationality.

No.	Pos.	Nation	Player
6	MF	AZE	Rauf Rustamli (loan return to (Azerbaijan) Sabah)
14	DF	POR	Pedro Pinto (to (Angola) Petro de Luanda)

=== Turan Tovuz ===
In: Note: Flags indicate national team as defined under FIFA eligibility rules; some limited exceptions apply. Players may hold more than one non-FIFA nationality.

No.	Pos.	Nation	Player
2	DF	RUS	Mark Mampassi (on loan from (Russia) Lokomotiv Moscow)
9	FW	ENG	Josh Ginnelly

Out: Note: Flags indicate national team as defined under FIFA eligibility rules; some limited exceptions apply. Players may hold more than one non-FIFA nationality.

No.	Pos.	Nation	Player
2	DF	AZE	Abdulla Rzayev (loan return to (Azerbaijan) Sabah)
21	FW	BRA	Alex Souza (to (Japan) Kyoto Sanga)
77	MF	AZE	Veysal Rzayev (to (Azerbaijan) Kapaz)

=== Zira ===
In: Note: Flags indicate national team as defined under FIFA eligibility rules; some limited exceptions apply. Players may hold more than one non-FIFA nationality.

No.	Pos.	Nation	Player
19	MF	AZE	Rufat Abdullazade (on loan from (Croatia) NK Varaždin)
—	MF	AZE	Anatoliy Nuriyev (from (Azerbaijan) Sabah)
—	FW	TUR	Eren Aydın (from (Ukraine) Veres Rivne)

Out: Note: Flags indicate national team as defined under FIFA eligibility rules; some limited exceptions apply. Players may hold more than one non-FIFA nationality.

No.	Pos.	Nation	Player
77	FW	BLR	Yegor Bogomolsky (on loan to (Russia) Ural Yekaterinburg)
