= Ildar Alekperov =

Russian footballer

Personal information
- Full name: Ildar Ruslan ogly Alekperov
- Date of birth: 27 April 2001 (age 25)
- Place of birth: Saint Petersburg, Russia
- Height: 1.74 m (5 ft 9 in)
- Position: Midfielder

Team information
- Current team: Alay
- Number: 18

Youth career
- Zenit St. Petersburg

Senior career*
Years	Team	Apps	(Gls)
2019–2020	Strogino Moscow	24	(3)
2020–2021	Neftekhimik Nizhnekamsk	6	(0)
2021–2024	Sabah	30	(0)
2024	→ Araz-Naxçıvan (loan)	8	(0)
2024–2025	Zira	3	(0)
2025–	Alay	13	(2)

International career^{‡}
2021–2022	Azerbaijan U21	9	(1)
- * Club domestic league appearances and goals as of 27 July 2025 ‡ National team caps and goals as of 19 February 2025

Ildar Ruslan ogly Alekperov (Azerbaijani: İldar Ruslan oğlu Ələkbərov; Russian: Ильдар Руслан оглы Алекперов; born 27 April 2001) is a professional footballer for Alay.

== Club career ==
He made his debut in the Russian Football National League for FC Neftekhimik Nizhnekamsk on 28 October 2020 in a game against FC Krasnodar-2. He substituted Ilya Petrov in the 64th minute.

=== Sabah ===
On 2 August 2021, Sabah announced the signing of Alekperov to a three-year contract.

On 10 January 2024, Alekperov joined Araz-Naxçıvan on loan for the remainder of the 2023–24 season.

=== Zira ===
On 10 September 2024, Zira announced the signing of Alekperov to a two-year contract, with the option of an additional year.
