= Numan Kurdić =

Bosnian professional footballer (born 1999)

Personal information
- Date of birth: 1 July 1999 (age 27)
- Place of birth: Tešanj, Bosnia and Herzegovina
- Height: 1.85 m (6 ft 1 in)
- Position: Centre-back

Team information
- Current team: Dinamo Tbilisi
- Number: 27

Youth career
- –2016: Velež Mostar
- 2016–2018: Sarajevo

Senior career*
| Years | Team | Apps | (Gls) |
| 2018–2022 | Sarajevo | 24 | (1) |
| 2020 | → Novi Pazar (loan) | 16 | (0) |
| 2021 | → Kukësi (loan) | 14 | (1) |
| 2022–2023 | RWDM | 6 | (0) |
| 2022–2023 | → Novi Pazar (loan) | 17 | (0) |
| 2023–2024 | Araz-Naxçıvan | 34 | (1) |
| 2024 | Kauno Žalgiris | 5 | (0) |
| 2025 | Novi Pazar | 13 | (0) |
| 2025–2026 | Mes Rafsanjan | 11 | (0) |
| 2026– | Dinamo Tbilisi | 15 | (1) |

International career^{‡}
| 2021– | Bosnia and Herzegovina | 1 | (0) |
- * Club domestic league appearances and goals as of 22 July 2026 ‡ National team caps and goals as of 18 December 2021

Numan Kurdić (born 1 July 1999) is a Bosnian professional footballer who plays as a centre-back for Erovnuli Liga club Dinamo Tbilisi and plays for the Bosnia and Herzegovina national team.

== Club career ==
=== Sarajevo ===
Kurdić started off his senior career at Sarajevo after playing in the youth team of Velež Mostar and Sarajevo before. He made his debut for Sarajevo on 28 July 2018, in a 4–0 home league win against Mladost Doboj Kakanj. He won his first trophy with the club on 15 May 2019, after Sarajevo beat Široki Brijeg in the final and won the 2018–19 Bosnian Cup. Three days after the cup final, on 18 May 2019, Kurdić also won the league title with Sarajevo after the club beat Zvijezda 09 4–0 at home.

He won his second league title with the club on 1 June 2020, though after the 2019–20 Bosnian Premier League season was ended abruptly due to the COVID-19 pandemic in Bosnia and Herzegovina and after which Sarajevo were by default crowned league champions for a second consecutive time.

On 9 July 2020, Kurdić was sent on a season-long loan to Serbian SuperLiga club Novi Pazar.

On 27 January 2021, he was sent on a half-season-long loan to Albanian Kategoria Superiore club Kukësi.

=== RWDM ===
On 17 January 2022, Kurdić signed a contract with Belgian First Division B club RWDM for a reported €150.000 transfer fee.

On 17 December 2022, Kurdić returned to Novi Pazar on a six-months loan.

=== Dinamo Tbilisi ===
On 13 February 2026, Erovnuli Liga club Dinamo Tbilisi announced the signing of Kurdić, to a one-year contract.

== Career statistics ==
=== Club ===
As of match played 26 December 2025

Appearances and goals by club, season and competition
| Club | Season | League | | | National cup (Note: Includes Bosnia and Herzegovina Cup, Serbian Cup, Albanian Cup, Azerbaijan Cup, Lithuanian Cup) | | Continental | | Total | |
| Club | Season | Division | Apps | Goals | Apps | Goals | Apps | Goals | Apps | Goals |
|---|---|---|---|---|---|---|---|---|---|---|
| Sarajevo | 2018–19 | Bosnian Premier League | 5 | 0 | 4 | 0 | 0 | 0 | 9 | 0 |
| Sarajevo | 2019–20 | Bosnian Premier League | 3 | 0 | 1 | 0 | 0 | 0 | 4 | 0 |
| Sarajevo | 2021–22 | Bosnian Premier League | 16 | 1 | 1 | 0 | 2 (Note: Appearances in UEFA Europa Conference League) | 0 | 19 | 1 |
| Sarajevo | Total | | 24 | 1 | 6 | 0 | 2 | 0 | 32 | 1 |
| Novi Pazar (loan) | 2020–21 | Serbian SuperLiga | 16 | 0 | 1 | 0 | — | | 17 | 0 |
| Kukësi (loan) | 2020–21 | Kategoria Superiore | 14 | 1 | 1 | 0 | — | | 15 | 1 |
| RWDM | 2021–22 | Challenger Pro League | 2 | 0 | — | | — | | 2 | 0 |
| RWDM | 2022–23 | Challenger Pro League | 4 | 0 | — | | — | | 4 | 0 |
| RWDM | Total | | 6 | 0 | — | | — | | 6 | 0 |
| Novi Pazar (loan) | 2022–23 | Serbian SuperLiga | 17 | 0 | 1 | 0 | — | | 18 | 0 |
| Araz-Naxçıvan | 2023–24 | Azerbaijan Premier League | 34 | 1 | 2 | 0 | — | | 36 | 1 |
| Kauno Žalgiris | 2024 | A Lyga | 5 | 0 | 2 | 0 | — | | 7 | 0 |
| Novi Pazar | 2024–25 | Serbian SuperLiga | 11 | 0 | 1 | 0 | — | | 12 | 0 |
| Novi Pazar | 2025–26 | Serbian SuperLiga | 2 | 0 | 0 | 0 | — | | 2 | 0 |
| Novi Pazar | Total | | 13 | 0 | 1 | 0 | — | | 14 | 0 |
| Mes Rafsanjan | 2025–26 | Persian Gulf Pro League | 11 | 0 | 2 | 0 | — | | 13 | 0 |
| Career total | | | 140 | 3 | 16 | 0 | 2 | 0 | 158 | 3 |

=== International ===
As of match played 18 December 2021

| National team | Year | Apps | Goals |
|---|---|---|---|
Bosnia and Herzegovina
| Bosnia and Herzegovina | 2021 | 1 | 0 |
| Total | | 1 | 0 |

== Honours ==
Sarajevo

- Bosnian Premier League: 2018–19, 2019–20
- Bosnian Cup: 2018–19
