= Vladislav Vasilyuchek =

Belarusian footballer

Personal information
- Date of birth: 28 March 1994 (age 32)
- Place of birth: Lida, Grodno Oblast, Belarus
- Height: 1.86 m (6 ft 1 in)
- Position: Goalkeeper

Team information
- Current team: Lida
- Number: 1

Youth career
- 2011–2014: Neman Grodno

Senior career*
Years	Team	Apps	(Gls)
2015–2019	Neman Grodno	11	(0)
2016	→ Smorgon (loan)	5	(0)
2016	→ Granit Mikashevichi (loan)	9	(0)
2017–2018	→ Gorodeya (loan)	15	(0)
2019	→ Lida (loan)	13	(0)
2019	→ Isloch Minsk Raion (loan)	0	(0)
2020–2021	Isloch Minsk Raion	18	(0)
2022	Neman Grodno	15	(0)
2023	Slutsk	13	(0)
2023–2024	Kapaz	6	(0)
2024	Turan	10	(0)
2025–2026	Smorgon	13	(0)
2026–	Lida	0	(0)

International career
2012	Belarus U19	3	(0)
2013–2016	Belarus U21	39	(0)
2017	Belarus B	1	(0)
- * Club domestic league appearances and goals as of 1 September 2026

Vladislav Vasilyuchek (Belarusian: Уладзіслаў Васілючак; Russian: Владислав Василючек; born 28 March 1994) is a Belarusian professional football player currently playing for Lida.

== Early life ==
Vasilyuchek was born in Lida.
