= Tuhay Alizade =

Azerbaijani footballer (born 2002)

Personal information
- Full name: Tuhay Faih ohly Alizade
- Date of birth: 8 July 2002 (age 24)
- Place of birth: Mariupol, Ukraine
- Height: 1.71 m (5 ft 7 in)
- Position: Attacking midfielder

Team information
- Current team: Sabail
- Number: 19

Youth career
- 2014–2015: Olimpiya-Azovstal Mariupol
- 2015–2019: Shakhtar Donetsk

Senior career*
Years	Team	Apps	(Gls)
2019–2021	Mariupol	0	(0)
2021–2022	Kremin Kremenchuk	7	(0)
2022–2025	Araz-Naxçıvan	0	(0)
2025–	Sabail	9	(1)

International career^{‡}
2017	Ukraine U15	1	(0)
2018	Azerbaijan U16	1	(0)
2022	Azerbaijan U21	2	(0)
- * Club domestic league appearances and goals as of 24 December 2025 ‡ National team caps and goals as of 20 November 2022

Tuhay Faih ohly Alizade (Azerbaijani: Tuqay Faiq oğlu Əlizadə; Ukrainian: Тугай Фаіг огли Алізаде; born 8 July 2002) is a professional footballer who plays as an attacking midfielder for Sabail in Azerbaijan First League. Born in Ukraine, he represented both Ukraine and Azerbaijan internationally on junior levels.
