= Mićo Kuzmanović =

Bosnian footballer

Personal information
- Date of birth: 18 March 1996 (age 30)
- Place of birth: Doboj, Bosnia and Herzegovina
- Height: 1.78 m (5 ft 10 in)
- Positions: Winger; forward

Team information
- Current team: Radnički 1923
- Number: 8

Youth career
- Modriča Maxima

Senior career*
Years	Team	Apps	(Gls)
2012–2013	Modriča Maxima	6	(2)
2013–2014	Zvijezda Gradačac	23	(4)
2014–2015	Jagodina	1	(0)
2015	Borac Banja Luka	3	(0)
2016	Drina Zvornik	12	(4)
2016–2017	Mladost DK	28	(3)
2017–2018	Sarajevo	24	(5)
2018–2019	Mouscron	14	(1)
2019–2020	Rudar Velenje	27	(5)
2020–2022	Celje	57	(10)
2022–2023	Tuzla City	30	(6)
2023–2025	Araz-Naxçıvan	62	(4)
2025–2026	Velež Mostar	22	(0)
2026–	Radnički 1923	0	(0)

International career
2013–2015	Bosnia and Herzegovina U19 (Note: Official competitive UEFA matches only.)	7	(1)
2017–2018	Bosnia and Herzegovina U21	8	(2)
- * Club domestic league appearances and goals as of 25 June 2026

Mićo Kuzmanović (Bosnian pronunciation: [mîːtɕo kuzmǎːnoʋitɕ]; born 18 March 1996) is a Bosnian professional footballer who plays as a winger for Serbian SuperLiga club Radnički 1923.

== Club career ==
=== Early career ===
Born in Doboj, Kuzmanović moved to Zvijezda Gradačac from Modriča Maxima in the summer of 2013. After one season, he joined the Serbian side Jagodina. After failing to secure a first-team spot in Jagodina, Kuzmanović moved back to Bosnia and Herzegovina, this time to Borac Banja Luka, with whom he signed in 2015. After just six months in Banja Luka, he switched clubs again and signed with Drina Zvornik.

In June 2016, he joined Mladost DK.

In May 2017, he signed a two-year deal with Sarajevo.

=== Mouscron ===
On 14 June 2018, Kuzmanović signed a three-year deal with Belgian side Mouscron on free transfer. He made his competitive debut for the club in a league loss to Oostende on 28 July. On 6 April 2019, he scored his first goal for the club against Cercle Brugge.

=== Rudar Velenje ===
On 2 September 2019, he joined Slovenian club Rudar Velenje on a two-year contract.

== International career ==
Kuzmanović represented Bosnia and Herzegovina at various youth levels.

== Career statistics ==
=== Club ===
As of match played 17 May 2019.

Appearances and goals by club, season and competition
Club	Season	League			National cup		Continental		Total	
Club	Season	Division	Apps	Goals	Apps	Goals	Apps	Goals	Apps	Goals
Modriča Maxima	2012–13	First League of RS	6	2	0	0	—		6	2
Zvijezda Gradačac	2013–14	Bosnian Premier League	23	4	1	0	—		24	4
Jagodina	2015–16	Serbian SuperLiga	1	0	0	0	—		1	0
Borac Banja Luka	2015–16	Bosnian Premier League	3	0	2	0	—		5	0
Drina Zvornik	2015–16	Bosnian Premier League	12	4	—		—		12	4
Mladost DK	2016–17	Bosnian Premier League	28	3	5	3	—		33	6
Sarajevo	2017–18	Bosnian Premier League	24	5	1	0	2	0	27	5
Mouscron	2018–19	Belgian First Division A	13	1	0	0	—		13	1
Mouscron	2019–20	Belgian First Division A	0	0	0	0	—		0	0
Mouscron	Total		13	1	0	0	0	0	13	1
Career total			110	19	9	3	2	0	121	22
