= Octávio =

Brazilian footballer (born 1993)

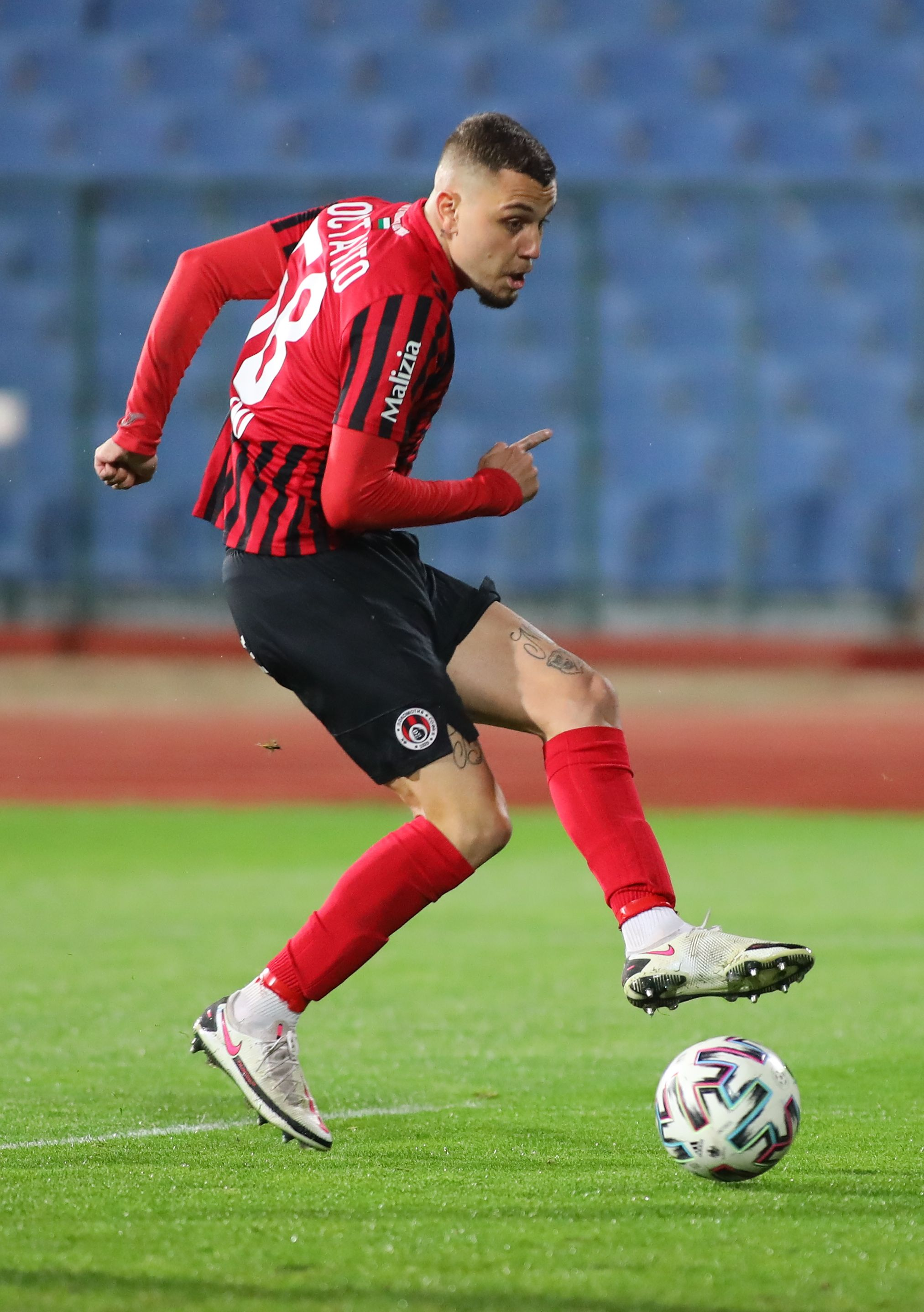
- Octávio with Lokomotiv Sofia in 2021

Personal information
- Full name: Octávio Merlo Manteca
- Date of birth: 29 December 1993 (age 32)
- Place of birth: Rio de Janeiro, Brazil
- Height: 1.84 m (6 ft 1/2 in)
- Position: Attacking midfielder

Team information
- Current team: Maricá
- Number: 23

Senior career*
Years	Team	Apps	(Gls)
2013–2017	Botafogo	29	(1)
2014	→ ABC (loan)	9	(4)
2014–2015	→ Fiorentina (loan)	0	(0)
2016	→ Tupi (loan)	12	(2)
2017	→ Volta Redonda (loan)	10	(3)
2017–2018	Beerschot	25	(1)
2019	Perilima	?	(1)
2020–2021	Beroe	35	(4)
2021–2022	Lokomotiv Sofia	28	(9)
2022–2025	CSKA 1948	47	(0)
2022–2025	CSKA 1948 II	3	(0)
2023–2024	→ Sumgayit (loan)	26	(0)
2025–2026	Lokomotiv Sofia	24	(4)
2026–	Maricá	6	(0)
- * Club domestic league appearances and goals as of 16 October 2026

Octávio Merlo Manteca (born 29 December 1993), simply known as Octávio, is a Brazilian professional footballer who plays for Maricá as a midfielder.

== Club career ==
Born in Rio de Janeiro, Octávio kicked off his career with Botafogo and made his debut in 2013. In the following season, though he started a match against Resende, he failed to make an impact.

He was loaned out to ABC in 2014 till the end of the year. At the end of the season he returned to his parent club, scoring 4 goals in total 9 appearances for the club.

Italian club Fiorentina took the Brazilian footballer on loan for the 2014–15 season.

He returned to Botafogo side for the Campeonato Brasileiro - Série B. After, he renewed his contract until 2017.

In June 2016, he was loaned out to Tupi Football Club, from Minas Gerais until the end of the season.

Octávio signed a 2-year during contract for Belgian side Beerschot-Wilrijk in the summer of 2017. He left the club in August 2018, and in January 2019, he joined Perilima. Octávio moved to Bulgarian club Beroe on 30 January 2020. After parting ways with Beroe in May 2021, Octávio remained in Bulgaria, signing a one-year contract with newly promoted Lokomotiv Sofia in August 2021.

== Honours ==
Individual

- Bulgarian First League Goal of the Week: 2021–22 (Week 18) v. Ludogorets
