= Elvis Mashike =

Congolese footballer

Personal information
- Full name: Elvis Mashike Sukisa
- Date of birth: 6 June 1994 (age 32)
- Place of birth: Democratic Republic of Congo
- Height: 1.86 m (6 ft 1 in)
- Position: Forward

Team information
- Current team: Michalovce

Senior career*
Years	Team	Apps	(Gls)
–2012	Slovan Galanta	4	(2)
2013–2014	Baník Ružiná	19	(7)
2013	→ Sereď (loan)	13	(0)
2014	Lokomotíva Zvolen	9	(1)
2014	→ ViOn Zlaté Moravce (loan)	8	(0)
2015	Slovan Galanta		
2016	Sereď	9	(1)
2016–2017	Lokomotíva Zvolen	16	(6)
2017	Loko Vltavín	17	(13)
2017–2018	Dynamo České Budějovice	15	(3)
2018–2021	Slovan Liberec	18	(1)
2019	→ Viktoria Žižkov (loan)	14	(4)
2019	→ Slavoj Vyšehrad (loan)	9	(0)
2020	→ Viktoria Žižkov (loan)	19	(8)
2021	Senica	16	(7)
2022	Žilina	3	(0)
2022–2023	Ħamrun Spartans	26	(18)
2023–2024	Araz-Naxçıvan	27	(4)
2024	Gostivar	17	(3)
2025	Floriana	16	(3)
2025–2026	Komárno	29	(5)
2027–	Michalovce	9	(2)
- * Club domestic league appearances and goals as of 21 September 2026

Elvis Mashike Sukisa (born 6 June 1994) is a Congolese professional footballer who plays as a forward for Slovak First Football League club Michalovce.

== Career ==
=== FC ViOn Zlaté Moravce ===
He made his professional debut for ViOn Zlaté Moravce against Ružomberok on 19 July 2014.
