= Ismail Azzaoui =

Belgian footballer (born 1998)

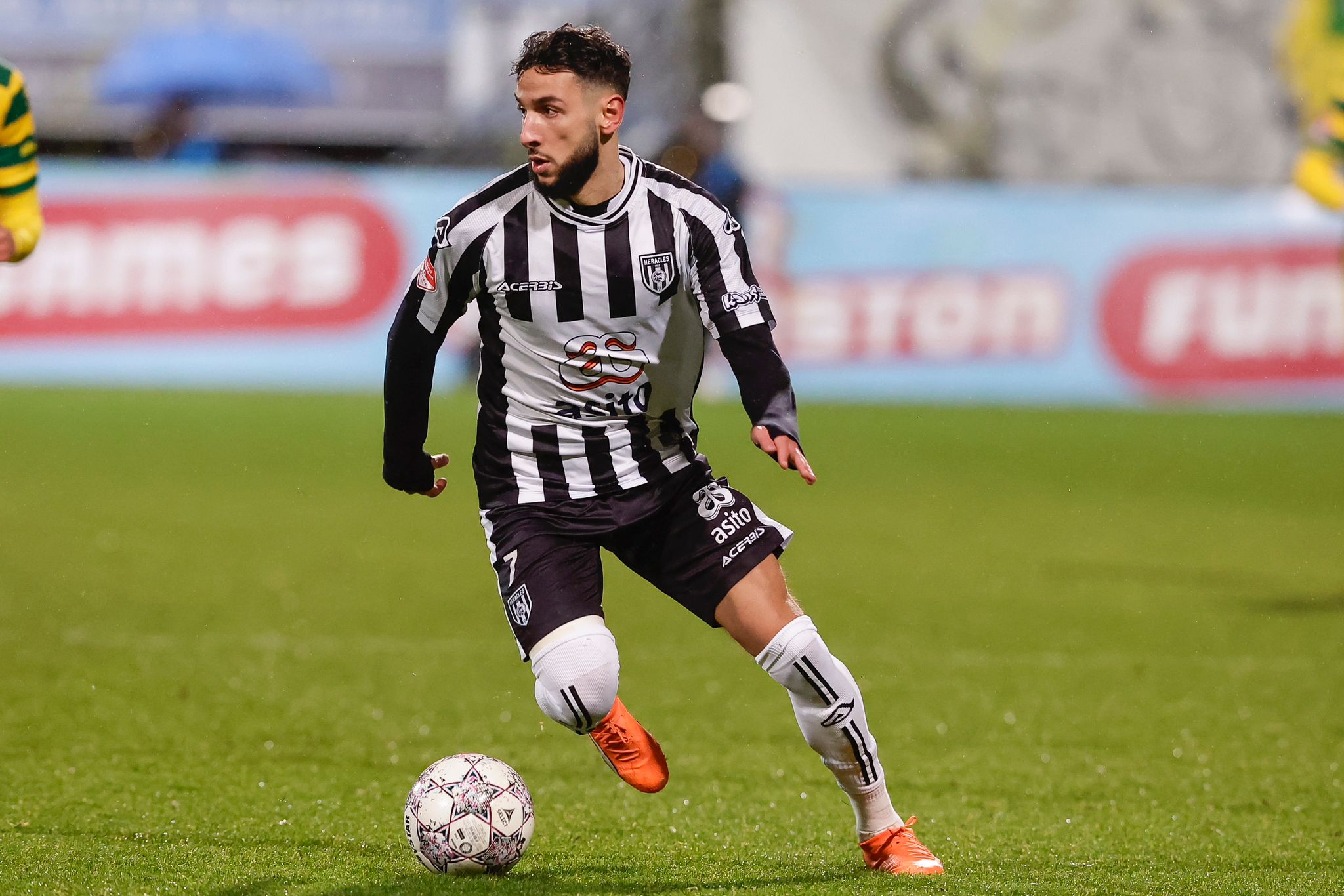
- Ismail Azzaoui

Personal information
- Full name: Ismail Azzaoui
- Date of birth: 6 January 1998 (age 28)
- Place of birth: Brussels, Belgium
- Height: 1.77 m (5 ft 10 in)
- Position: Winger

Youth career
- –2014: R.S.C. Anderlecht
- 2014–2015: Tottenham Hotspur

Senior career*
Years	Team	Apps	(Gls)
2015–2020	VfL Wolfsburg II	9	(4)
2015–2020	VfL Wolfsburg	2	(0)
2017–2018	→ Willem II (loan)	24	(4)
2020–2023	Heracles	50	(7)
2023–2024	Araz-Naxçıvan	26	(2)
2024–2025	Omonia 29M	7	(0)

International career
2013	Belgium U15	2	(0)
2013–2014	Belgium U16	11	(2)
2014–2015	Belgium U17	17	(6)
2016	Belgium U19	1	(0)
- * Club domestic league appearances and goals as of 14:32, 12 May 2025 (UTC)

Ismail Azzaoui (born 6 January 1998) is a Belgian footballer who plays as a winger.

== Club career ==
Born in Brussels, Azzaoui started playing football with R.S.C. Anderlecht. In 2015, he joined VfL Wolfsburg from Tottenham Hotspur for a transfer fee of reportedly €500,000 and made his Bundesliga debut on 21 November 2015 against Werder Bremen. He substituted Daniel Caligiuri after 76 minutes in a 6–0 home win.

In early August 2017, Azzaoui was transferred to Dutch Eredivisie club Willem II for a season-long loan. After his return to Wolfsburg, Azzaoui suffered a second major knee injury and was out for the whole 2018-19 season. On 27 October 2020 Azzaoui signed a one-year contract with Dutch side Heracles Almelo. On 1 December 2021 in a match against Feyenoord, Azzaoui suffered the third major knee injury of his career. One day later on 2 December 2021 it was announced he would miss the remainder of the 2021-22 season.

On 11 October 2022, Azzaoui returned to Heracles until the end of the season, with an option to extend for two more seasons.

On 24 December 2024 Cypriot First Division club Omonia 29 announced that they signed Azzaoui.

== International career ==
He is of Moroccan ancestry and plays for the Belgium U17 team.

== Honors ==
Belgium U17

- FIFA U-17 World Cup third place: 2015

== Career statistics ==
As of 18 August 2018

Club	Season	League			Cup		Continental		Other		Total	
Club	Season	Division	Apps	Goals	Apps	Goals	Apps	Goals	Apps	Goals	Apps	Goals
VfL Wolfsburg II	Regionalliga Nord	2015–16	1	0	–		–		–		1	0
VfL Wolfsburg II	Regionalliga Nord	2016–17	1	2	–		–		–		1	2
VfL Wolfsburg II	Regionalliga Nord	2019–20	1	1	–		–		–		1	1
VfL Wolfsburg II	Total		3	3	0	0	0	0	0	0	3	3
VfL Wolfsburg	Bundesliga	2015–16	2	0	0	0	0	0	0	0	2	0
Willem II	Eredivisie	2017–18	19	3	2	1	0	0	0	0	21	4
Career total			24	6	2	1	0	0	0	0	26	7
