= Zamiq Əliyev =

Azerbaijani footballer (born 2001)

Personal information
- Full name: Zamiq Arastun oğlu Əliyev
- Date of birth: 5 May 2001 (age 25)
- Place of birth: Baku, Azerbaijan
- Height: 1.91 m (6 ft 3 in)
- Position: Centre-back

Team information
- Current team: Egnatia
- Number: 4

Youth career
- Qarabağ

Senior career*
Years	Team	Apps	(Gls)
2020–2022	Qarabağ	1	(0)
2022–2023	→ Kapaz (loan)	20	(0)
2023	Kapaz	0	(0)
2023–2024	Araz-Naxçıvan	18	(0)
2024–	Egnatia	57	(1)

International career^{‡}
2017	Azerbaijan U17	1	(0)
2018–2019	Azerbaijan U19	3	(0)
2021–2022	Azerbaijan U21	5	(0)
2024–	Azerbaijan	2	(0)
- * Club domestic league appearances and goals as of 25 June 2026 ‡ National team caps and goals as of 13 May 2025

Zamiq Arastun oğlu Əliyev (born 5 May 2001) is an Azerbaijani footballer who plays as a defender for Albanian club Egnatia in the Kategoria Superiore and the Azerbaijan national team.

== Club career ==
On 15 May 2022, Əliyev made his debut in the Azerbaijan Premier League for Qarabağ match against Sabail.

== International career ==
He represented Azerbaijan at youth level from the under-17 to under-21 level.

He received his first call-up from the Azerbaijan national football team for the 2024–25 UEFA Nations League C matches against Estonia and Slovakia in October 2024, but was an unused substitute in both matches.

Əliyev made his debut on 19 November 2024 in a Nations League game against Sweden at the Strawberry Arena. He substituted Badavi Guseynov at half-time, as Sweden won 6–0.

== Honours ==
Qarabağ

- Azerbaijan Premier League: 2021–22
- Azerbaijan Cup: 2021–22

Egnatia

- Kategoria Superiore: 2024–25
