= Mohammed Kadiri =

Ghanaian footballer (born 1996)

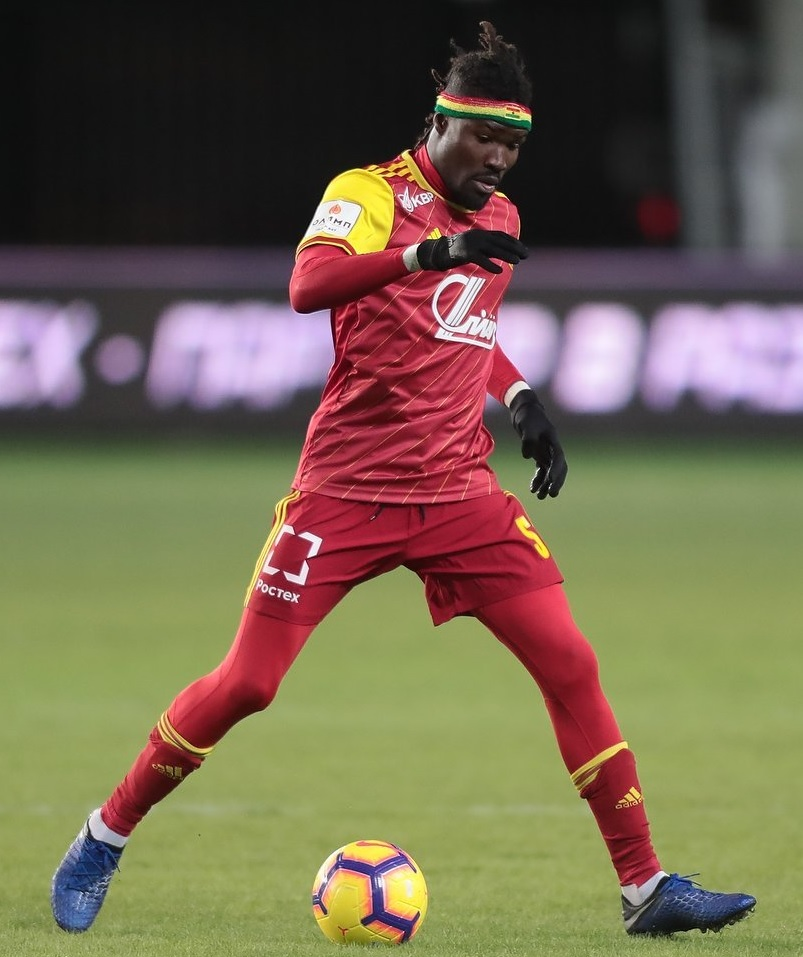
- Mohammed with Arsenal Tula in 2019

Personal information
- Full name: Abdul Kadiri Mohammed
- Date of birth: 7 March 1996 (age 30)
- Place of birth: Obuasi, Ghana
- Height: 1.86 m (6 ft 1 in)
- Position: Midfielder

Team information
- Current team: Asta Mingachevir

Youth career
- Ashanti Gold

Senior career*
Years	Team	Apps	(Gls)
2015–2016	Ashanti Gold	20	(1)
2016–2019	Austria Wien	32	(0)
2018–2019	→ Arsenal Tula (loan)	22	(1)
2019–2023	Dynamo Kyiv	15	(0)
2020–2021	→ Arsenal Tula (loan)	11	(2)
2021	→ Chornomorets Odesa (loan)	13	(0)
2022	→ Budapest Honvéd (loan)	9	(0)
2023–2024	Araz-Naxçıvan	30	(3)
2024–2025	Mohammedan	0	(0)
2025–	Asta Mingachevir.		
- * Club domestic league appearances and goals as of 17:46, 3 July 2024 (UTC)

Abdul Mohammed Kadiri (born 7 March 1996) is a Ghanaian professional footballer who plays for Asta Mingachevir.

== Club career ==
=== Ashanti Gold ===
Kadiri played in 20 games for the defending Ghana Premier League champions Ashanti Gold S.C. in 2016. He also played in the Ghana Super Cup, which Ashanti Gold lost 1–0 to Medeama S.C.

=== Austria Wien ===
Kadiri joined FK Austria Wien on 31 August 2016. He made his debut for Wien in a 2–0 win over SV Mattersburg on 16 October 2016.

On 2 August 2018, Kadiri signed a season-long loan deal with Russian Premier League club Arsenal Tula.

=== Dynamo Kyiv ===
On 3 June 2019, Kadiri signed a contract with the Ukrainian Premier League runner-up FC Dynamo Kyiv. On 16 September 2020, he was loaned back to FC Arsenal Tula until the end of the 2020–21 season. On 5 January 2021, the loan was terminated early by Kadiri's request for family reasons. On 15 February 2022, Kadiri was loaned to Budapest Honvéd in Hungary.

In February 2023, Kadiri went on trial with Tajikistan Higher League club Istiklol.

=== Araz-Naxçıvan ===
On 28 July 2023, Araz-Naxçıvan announced the signing of Kadiri.

== International career ==
Kadiri was first called up to the Ghana national football team in the summer of 2016 by Avram Grant. He is yet to make his national team debut.

== Personal life ==
Kadiri is of the royal bloodline of Ghana's Northern Region royal family, and had a life of wealth and privilege growing up. He has a sister and five brothers. Two of his brothers, Mohammed Fatau and Mohammed Sammed, are also professional footballers.

== Career statistics ==
As of the end of the 2019–20 season

Appearances and goals by club, season and competition
Club	Season	League			Cup		Continental		Other		Total	
Club	Season	Division	Apps	Goals	Apps	Goals	Apps	Goals	Apps	Goals	Apps	Goals
Ashanti Gold	2016	Ghana Premier League	20	1	—		—		1 (Note: Appearance in Ghana Super Cup)	0	21	1
Austria Wien	2016–17	Austrian Bundesliga	10	0	1	0	—		—		11	0
Austria Wien	2017–18	Austrian Bundesliga	22	0	1	0	9 (Note: Appearance(s) in UEFA Europa League)	0	—		32	0
Austria Wien	Total		32	0	2	0	9	0	—		43	0
Austria Wien II	2016–17	Austrian Regionalliga	1	0	—		—		—		1	0
Arsenal Tula (loan)	2018–19	Russian Premier League	22	1	5	1	—		—		27	2
Dynamo Kyiv	2019–20	Ukrainian Premier League	15	0	1	0	—		—		16	0
Career total			90	2	8	1	9	0	1	0	108	3
