= Nicat Süleymanov =

Azerbaijani footballer (born 1998)

Personal information
- Full name: Nicat Zaur oğlu Süleymanov
- Date of birth: 15 November 1998 (age 27)
- Place of birth: Azerbaijan
- Height: 1.78 m (5 ft 10 in)
- Position: Midfielder

Team information
- Current team: Sabail
- Number: 7

Youth career
- Baku

Senior career*
Years	Team	Apps	(Gls)
2018–2020	Qarabağ	1	(0)
2019–2020	→ Zira (loan)	13	(4)
2021	Turan Tovuz		
2021–2023	Kapaz	27	(2)
2023–2024	Araz-Naxçıvan	24	(0)
2024–2025	Kapaz	20	(1)
2025–	Sabail	5	(0)

International career
2014–2015	Azerbaijan U17	6	(1)
2019	Azerbaijan U21	2	(0)
- * Club domestic league appearances and goals as of 23 October 2025

Nicat Zaur oğlu Süleymanov (born on 15 November 1998) is an Azerbaijani footballer who plays as a midfielder for Sabail in the Azerbaijan First League.

== Club career ==
On 12 May 2018, Süleymanov made his debut in the Azerbaijan Premier League for Qarabağ match against Keşla.

== Honours ==
Qarabağ

- Azerbaijan Premier League (2): 2017–18, 2018–19
