= Rauf Rustamli =

Azerbaijani footballer (born 2003)

Personal information
- Full name: Rauf Bakir oglu Rustamli
- Date of birth: 11 January 2003 (age 23)
- Place of birth: Azerbaijan
- Height: 1.78 m (5 ft 10 in)
- Position: Midfielder

Team information
- Current team: Sabah
- Number: 16

Senior career*
Years	Team	Apps	(Gls)
2022–2023	Gabala	1	(0)
2023–	Sabah	2	(0)
2024–2025	→ Shamakhi (loan)	31	(0)
2025–2026	→ Sumgayit (loan)	9	(0)
2026	→ Karvan (loan)	17	(3)

International career^{‡}
2019	Azerbaijan U17	1	(0)
2021	Azerbaijan U19	7	(0)
2023–2024	Azerbaijan U21	3	(0)
2025–	Azerbaijan	1	(0)
- * Club domestic league appearances and goals as of 4 July 2026 ‡ National team caps and goals as of 10 June 2025

Rauf Rustamli (Azerbaijani: Rauf Rüstəmli; born 11 January 2003) is an Azerbaijani professional footballer who plays as a midfielder for Azerbaijan Premier League club Sabah, and the Azerbaijan national team.

== Club career ==
On 8 August 2022, Rustamli made his debut in the Azerbaijan Premier League for Gabala in a match against Turan Tovuz.

On 17 June 2024, Shamakhi announced the season-long loan signing of Rustamli from Sabah.

== International career ==
Rustamli made his debut for the senior Azerbaijan national team on 10 June 2025 in a friendly against Hungary.

== Career statistics ==
=== Club ===
As of match played 8 August 2022

Appearances and goals by club, season and competition
Club	Season	League			Azerbaijan Cup		Continental		Other		Total	
Club	Season	Division	Apps	Goals	Apps	Goals	Apps	Goals	Apps	Goals	Apps	Goals
Gabala	2022–23	Azerbaijan Premier League	1	0	0	0	0	0	—		1	0
Career total			1	0	0	0	0	0	—		1	0
