= Abdulla Rzayev =

Azerbaijani footballer (born 2002)

Personal information
- Full name: Abdulla İmran oğlu Rzayev
- Date of birth: 12 March 2002 (age 24)
- Place of birth: Azerbaijan
- Height: 1.74 m (5 ft 9 in)
- Position: Defender

Team information
- Current team: Araz-Naxçıvan (on loan from Sabah)
- Number: 2

Senior career*
Years	Team	Apps	(Gls)
2021–	Sabah	4	(0)
2022	→ Shamakhi (loan)	4	(0)
2023	→ Kapaz (loan)	18	(0)
2023–2024	→ Araz-Naxçıvan (loan)	28	(1)
2025–2026	→ Turan Tovuz (loan)	2	(0)
2026	→ Şamaxı FK (loan)	14	(1)
2026–	→ Araz-Naxçıvan (loan)	2	(0)

International career^{‡}
2021–2024	Azerbaijan U21	16	(0)
2026–	Azerbaijan	1	(0)
Medal record
Men's football
Representing Azerbaijan
Islamic Solidarity Games
Bronze medal – third place	2021 Konya
- * Club domestic league appearances and goals as of 17:33, 25 August 2026 (UTC) ‡ National team caps and goals as of 21:05, 28 April 2026 (UTC)

Abdulla İmran oğlu Rzayev (born 12 March 2002) is an Azerbaijani professional footballer who plays as a defender for Azerbaijan Premier League club Araz-Naxçıvan, on loan from Sabah, and the Azerbaijan national team.

== Club career ==
On 20 July 2022, Rzayev joined Shamakhi on loan for the season from Sabah, making his debut in the Azerbaijan Premier League on 27 August 2022 against Qarabağ.

On 3 January 2023, Rzayev was recalled from his loan deal with Shamakhi, and then joined Kapaz on loan for the remainder of the season.
