= Turan Manafov =

Azerbaijani footballer (born 1998)

Personal information
- Full name: Turan Manafov
- Date of birth: 19 August 1998 (age 28)
- Place of birth: Qax, Azerbaijan
- Height: 1.83 m (6 ft 0 in)
- Position: Left-back

Team information
- Current team: Stellenbosch

Youth career
- Neftçi Baku
- 2017–2018: Qarabağ
- 2018–2019: Sumgayit

Senior career*
Years	Team	Apps	(Gls)
2019	Zagatala	12	(0)
2019–2023	Sabail	75	(3)
2022	→ Olympiacos Volos (loan)	4	(0)
2023–2024	Araz-Naxçıvan	33	(3)
2024–2025	Kapaz	28	(2)
2025-	Stellenbosch	7	(0)
2026	→ Qabala (loan)	8	(0)

International career
2019–2020	Azerbaijan U21	8	(0)
- * Club domestic league appearances and goals as of 1 June 2026

Turan Manafov (born 19 August 1998) is an Azerbaijani professional footballer who plays as a left-back for South African Premier Division club Stellenbosch.

== Club career ==
On 23 September 2018, Manafov made his debut in the Azerbaijan Premier League for Sumgayit against Keşla.

On September 10, 2024, Kapaz signed a contract with Manafov until the end of the season.

On 29 January 2026, Azerbaijan Premier League club Qabala announced the loan signing of Manafov from Stellenbosch, until the end of the 2025–26 season. On 1 June 2026, Gabala announced that Manafov had returned to Stellenbosch after his loan deal had expired.

== Career statistics ==
As of match played 21 March 2026

Appearances and goals by club, season and competition
Club	Season	League			National Cup		Continental		Total	
Club	Season	Division	Apps	Goals	Apps	Goals	Apps	Goals	Apps	Goals
Gabala (loan)	2025–26	Azerbaijan Premier League	8	0	2	0	-		10	0
Career total			8	0	2	0	-	-	10	0
