= 2022–23 Turan Tovuz season =

Turan Tovuz
2022-23 season
- Chairman: Ogtay Abdullayev
- Manager: Aykhan Abbasov
- Stadium: Tovuz City Stadium
- Premier League: 6th
- Azerbaijan Cup: Semifinal vs Neftçi
- Top goalscorer: League: Rooney Eva (15); All: Rooney Eva (16)
Home colours	Away colours

The Turan Tovuz 2022–23 season is Turan Tovuz's first Azerbaijan Premier League season since the 2012–13 season, and their twenty-third Premier League season.

== Season events ==
On 28 June, Turan Tovuz announced the signings of Tarlan Guliyev, Tarlan Ahmadli, Şehriyar Aliyev and Kamal Bayramov to one-year contracts.

The following day, 29 June, Turan Tovuz announced the season-long loan signing of Turan Valizade from Neftçi and of Veysal Rzayev and Shakir Seyidov from Sabah.

On 30 June, Ehtiram Shahverdiyev and Eltun Turabov joined Turan Tovuz on one-year contracts.

On 1 July, Khayal Najafov joined Turan Tovuz on a season-long loan deal from Neftçi.

On 13 July, Turan Tovuz announced the signings of Imeda Ashortia and Piruz Marakvelidze to one-year contracts from Telavi.

On 20 July, Turan Tovuz announced the signings of Aykhan Guseynov and Javid Taghiyev to one-year contracts, with Vusal Masimov also signing a one-year contract the following day.

On 2 August, Turan Tovuz announced the signing of Sadig Guliyev to a one-year contract, from Machhindra, and the signing of Nathan Oduwa to a one-year contract from Shamakhi.

On 4 August, Turan Tovuz announced the signing of Ben Aziz Dao to a one-year contract, from AS Douanes.

On 17 August, Turan Tovuz announced the signing of Siyanda Xulu to a one-year contract, from Hapoel Tel Aviv.

On 29 August, Turan Tovuz announced the signing of Henry Okebugwu to a one-year contract, from KS Kastrioti.

On 9 January, Turan Tovuz announced the signing of Denis Marandici on a contract until the end of the season, from Zrinjski Mostar.

On 22 January, Turan Tovuz announced the signing of Belajdi Pusi to a six-month contract, with the option of an additional year, from Skënderbeu Korçë.

On 22 March, Turan Tovuz announced the signing of Roderick Miller to a three-month contract, with the option of an additional year, from Al-Minaa.

On 24 March, Şehriyar Aliyev signed a new one-year contract, keeping him at the club until the summer of 2024. On 29 March, Turan Tovuz signed a new one-year contract with Denis Marandici, with the option of another additional year.

== Squad ==
As of match played 28 May 2023

No.	Name	Nationality	Position	Date of birth (age)	Signed from	Signed in	Contract ends	Apps.	Goals
Goalkeepers
1	Tarlan Ahmadli	(Azerbaijan)	GK	21 November 1994 (aged 28)	Sumgayit	2022	2023	29	0
13	Mehman Hajiyev	(Azerbaijan)	GK	28 January 1995 (aged 28)	Youth team				
85	Kamal Bayramov	(Azerbaijan)	GK	19 August 1985 (aged 37)	Shamakhi	2022	2023		
Defenders
2	Roderick Miller	(Panama)	DF	3 April 1992 (aged 31)	Al-Minaa	2023	2023 (+1)	8	2
3	Tarlan Guliyev	(Azerbaijan)	DF	19 April 1992 (aged 31)	Shamakhi	2022	2023	27	1
4	Şehriyar Aliyev	(Azerbaijan)	DF	25 December 1992 (aged 30)	Shamakhi	2022	2023	37	3
5	Ben Aziz Dao	(Burkina Faso)	DF	8 July 1999 (aged 23)	AS Douanes	2022	2023	9	0
15	Vusal Masimov	(Azerbaijan)	DF	3 April 2000 (aged 23)	Kapaz	2022	2023	10	0
25	Denis Marandici	(Moldova)	DF	18 September 1996 (aged 26)	Zrinjski Mostar	2023	2024	17	1
33	Eltun Turabov	(Azerbaijan)	DF	18 February 1997 (aged 26)	Sabah	2022	2023	26	0
39	Sadig Guliyev	(Azerbaijan)	DF	9 March 1995 (aged 28)	Machhindra	2022	2023	25	1
55	Siyanda Xulu	(South Africa)	DF	30 December 1991 (aged 31)	Hapoel Tel Aviv	2022	2023	27	1
83	Hüseyn Hüseynov	(Azerbaijan)	DF	25 July 2006 (aged 16)	Youth team	2023		1	0
88	Faig Hajiyev	(Azerbaijan)	DF	22 May 1999 (aged 24)	Gabala	2021			
97	Sadig Şafiyev	(Azerbaijan)	DF	13 October 2005 (aged 17)	Youth team	2022		1	0
Midfielders
6	Turan Valizade	(Azerbaijan)	MF	1 January 2001 (aged 22)	on loan from Neftçi	2022	2023	29	1
7	Ehtiram Shahverdiyev	(Azerbaijan)	MF	1 October 1996 (aged 26)	Gabala	2022	2023	28	2
8	Shakir Seyidov	(Azerbaijan)	MF	31 December 2000 (aged 22)	on loan from Sabah	2022	2023	31	0
10	Khayal Najafov	(Azerbaijan)	MF	19 December 1997 (aged 25)	on loan from Neftçi	2022	2023	38	2
11	Aykhan Guseynov	(Russia)	MF	3 September 1999 (aged 23)	Khimki	2022	2023	35	3
17	Nathan Oduwa	(Nigeria)	MF	5 March 1996 (aged 27)	Shamakhi	2022	2023	32	6
21	Abbas Aghazade	(Azerbaijan)	MF	5 March 1996 (aged 27)	Sabah	2022	2023	21	0
23	Henry Okebugwu	(Nigeria)	MF	19 June 1998 (aged 24)	Kastrioti	2022	2023	17	1
24	Divine Naah	(Ghana)	MF	20 April 1996 (aged 27)	Kauno Žalgiris	2023		6	0
30	Piruz Marakvelidze	(Georgia (country))	MF	21 January 1995 (aged 28)	Telavi	2022	2023	22	0
44	Elçin Qasımov	(Azerbaijan)	MF	4 September 2002 (aged 20)	Academy	2022		1	0
60	Sabayel Bagirov	(Azerbaijan)	MF	5 March 1996 (aged 27)	Diyarbakir Yol	2019			
77	Javid Taghiyev	(Azerbaijan)	MF	22 July 1992 (aged 30)	Sabail	2022	2023	11	0
99	Veysal Rzayev	(Azerbaijan)	MF	24 October 2002 (aged 20)	on loan from Sabah	2022	2023	27	0
Forwards
9	Belajdi Pusi	(Albania)	FW	23 January 1998 (aged 25)	Skënderbeu Korçë	2023	2023 (+1)	20	0
19	Rooney Eva	(Cameroon)	FW	25 December 1996 (aged 26)	Apollon Pontus	2022		36	17
22	Famil Jamalov	(Azerbaijan)	FW	8 April 1998 (aged 25)	Neftçi	2022		2	0
Out on loan
Left during the season
9	Imeda Ashortia	(Georgia (country))	FW	30 October 1996 (aged 26)	Telavi	2022	2023	15	0

== Transfers ==
=== In ===
Date	Position	Nationality	Name	From	Fee	Ref.
28 June 2022	GK	(Azerbaijan)	Tarlan Ahmadli	Sumgayit	Undisclosed	
28 June 2022	GK	(Azerbaijan)	Kamal Bayramov	Shamakhi	Undisclosed	
28 June 2022	DF	(Azerbaijan)	Tarlan Guliyev	Shamakhi	Undisclosed	
28 June 2022	DF	(Azerbaijan)	Şehriyar Aliyev	Shamakhi	Undisclosed	
30 June 2022	MF	(Azerbaijan)	Ehtiram Shahverdiyev	Gabala	Undisclosed	
30 June 2022	MF	(Azerbaijan)	Eltun Turabov	Sabah	Undisclosed	
1 July 2022	MF	(Azerbaijan)	Nazim Hasanzada	Sabah	Undisclosed	
1 July 2022	FW	(Cameroon)	Rooney Eva	Apollon Pontus	Undisclosed	
13 July 2022	MF	(Georgia (country))	Piruz Marakvelidze	Telavi	Undisclosed	
13 July 2022	FW	(Georgia (country))	Imeda Ashortia	Telavi	Undisclosed	
20 July 2022	MF	(Azerbaijan)	Javid Taghiyev	Sabail	Undisclosed	
20 July 2022	MF	(Russia)	Aykhan Guseynov	Khimki	Undisclosed	
21 July 2022	DF	(Azerbaijan)	Vusal Masimov	Kapaz	Undisclosed	
2 August 2022	DF	(Azerbaijan)	Sadig Guliyev	Machhindra	Undisclosed	
2 August 2022	MF	(Nigeria)	Nathan Oduwa	Shamakhi	Undisclosed	
4 August 2022	DF	(Burkina Faso)	Ben Aziz Dao	AS Douanes	Undisclosed	
17 August 2022	DF	(South Africa)	Siyanda Xulu	Hapoel Tel Aviv	Undisclosed	
29 August 2022	MF	(Nigeria)	Henry Okebugwu	Kastrioti	Undisclosed	
9 January 2023	DF	(Moldova)	Denis Marandici	Zrinjski Mostar	Undisclosed	
22 January 2023	FW	(Albania)	Belajdi Pusi	Skënderbeu Korçë	Undisclosed	
22 March 2023	DF	(Panama)	Roderick Miller	Al-Minaa	Undisclosed	

=== Loans in ===
Date from	Position	Nationality	Name	From	Date to	Ref.
29 June 2022	MF	(Azerbaijan)	Veysal Rzayev	Sabah	End of season	
29 June 2022	MF	(Azerbaijan)	Shakir Seyidov	Sabah	End of season	
29 June 2022	MF	(Azerbaijan)	Turan Valizade	Neftçi	End of season	
1 July 2022	MF	(Azerbaijan)	Khayal Najafov	Neftçi	End of season	

=== Released ===
Date	Position	Nationality	Name	Joined	Date	Ref
31 December 2022	FW	(Georgia (country))	Imeda Ashortia	Telavi		
30 June 2023	DF	(Burkina Faso)	Ben Aziz Dao			
30 June 2023	DF	(South Africa)	Siyanda Xulu	SuperSport United	28 July 2023	
30 June 2023	MF	(Azerbaijan)	Abbas Aghazade			
30 June 2023	MF	(Azerbaijan)	Javid Taghiyev	Iravan	1 September 2023	
30 June 2023	MF	(Ghana)	Divine Naah	Kauno Žalgiris	25 August 2023	
30 June 2023	MF	(Nigeria)	Nathan Oduwa	Chungbuk Cheongju	15 January 2024	
30 June 2023	MF	(Nigeria)	Henry Okebugwu	Iliria	16 October 2023	
30 June 2023	FW	(Azerbaijan)	Famil Jamalov	Iravan	1 September 2023	
30 June 2023	FW	(Cameroon)	Rooney Eva	CSKA 1948 Sofia	14 July 2023	

== Friendlies ==
	–
AZT (UTC+4)

== Competitions ==
=== Overview ===
Competition	First match	Last match	Starting round	Final position	Record							
Competition	First match	Last match	Starting round	Final position	Pld	W	D	L	GF	GA	GD	Win %
Premier League	8 August 2022	28 May 2023	Matchday 1	6th	36	10	9	17	36	49	−13	27.78
Azerbaijan Cup	22 November 2022	26 April 2023	First Round	Semifinal	5	3	1	1	6	5	+1	60.00
Total					41	13	10	18	42	54	−12	31.71

Last updated: 28 May 2023
Source: Competitions

=== Premier League ===
==== Results summary ====
Overall								Home						Away					
Pld	W	D	L	GF	GA	GD	Pts	W	D	L	GF	GA	GD	W	D	L	GF	GA	GD
36	10	9	17	36	49	−13	39	4	4	10	21	28	−7	6	5	7	15	21	−6

Last updated: 28 May 2023.
Source: See Results

==== Results by round ====
Round	1	2	3	4	5	6	7	8	9	10	11	12	13	14	15	16	17	18	19	20	21	22	23	24	25	26	27	28	29	30	31	32	33	34	35	36
Ground	H	A	A (Note: matchday 4)	A (Note: matchday 5)	H (Note: matchday 6)	A (Note: matchday 7)	H (Note: matchday 8)	A (Note: matchday 9)	H (Note: matchday 10)	A (Note: matchday 11)	H (Note: matchday 12)	H (Note: matchday 13)	H (Note: matchday 3)	A	H	A	H	A	H	A	A	H	A	H	A	H	A	H	H	A	H	A	H	A	H	A
Result	L	W	D	W	W	L	L	D	D	L	W	L	L	D	L	L	L	D	L	L	W	W	W	L	L	D	D	L	D	L	L	W	W	W	D	L
Position	9	6	5	5	4	5	6	6	6	6	6	6	6	6	6	6	6	6	6	6	6	6	6	6	6	6	6	6	6	6	6	6	6	6	6	6

Updated to match(es) played on 22 May 2023. Source: See Results
A = Away; H = Home; W = Win; D = Draw; L = Loss

==== Results ====
8 August 2022 1	Turan Tovuz	0 – 2	Gabala	Tovuz
17:00 AZT (UTC+4)	Marakvelidze (red card) 32'; Turabov (yellow card) 57'	Report	Musayev (yellow card) 51'; Alimi 58' (pen.); Utzig 63'; Abu Akel (yellow card) 90+7'; Rustamli (yellow card) 90+10'	Stadium: City Stadium; Referee: Raad Ahmadov

13 August 2022 2	Sabail	0 – 1	Turan Tovuz	Baku
20:30 AZT (UTC+4)	Manafov (yellow card) 62'; Zamanov (yellow card) 88'; Hajiyev (yellow card) 90+8'	Report	Seyidov (yellow card) 13'; Oduwa 48' (yellow card) 49'	Stadium: Bayil Arena; Referee: Rauf Allahverdiyev

26 August 2022 4	Sumgayit	0 – 0	Turan Tovuz	Sumgait
19:00 AZT (UTC+4)	Mustafayev (yellow card) 15'; Abdullazade (yellow card) 23'	Report	Seyidov (yellow card) 45+1'	Stadium: Kapital Bank Arena; Referee: Ingilab Mammadov

3 September 2022 5	Shamakhi	0 – 1	Turan Tovuz	Shamakhi
16:00 AZT (UTC+4)	Yunanov (yellow card) 6'; Mammadov (yellow card) 27'	Report	Eva 85'	Stadium: Shamakhi City Stadium; Referee: Rauf Allahverdiyev

9 September 2022 6	Turan Tovuz	2 – 0	Kapaz	Tovuz
16:30 AZT (UTC+4)	Valizade (yellow card) 10'; Eva 39', 77' (pen.); Aliyev (yellow card) 85'	Report	Maharramli (yellow card) 24'; Kantaria (yellow card) 70'; Samadov (yellow card) 71'; Ergemlidze (yellow card) 76'	Stadium: City Stadium; Referee: Vugar Hasanli

16 September 2022 7	Sabah	3 – 1	Turan Tovuz	Masazır
18:00 AZT (UTC+4)	Volkovi 15'; Apeh (yellow card) 18'; Mickels 34'; Camalov 90+5' (pen.)	Report	Seyidov (red card) 36'; Shahverdiyev (yellow card) 75'; Eva 81'	Stadium: Bank Respublika Arena; Referee: Rauf Jabbarov

1 October 2022 8	Turan Tovuz	1 – 3	Zira	Tovuz
15:30 AZT (UTC+4)	Oduwa 27'	Report	Taşqın (yellow card) 16'; Diniyev 33'; Keyta 40', 48'	Stadium: City Stadium; Referee: Rauf Allahverdiyev

8 October 2022 9	Neftçi	0 – 0	Turan Tovuz	Baku
19:30 AZT (UTC+4)	Buludov (yellow card) 5'; Saief (yellow card) 90+8'	Report	Okebugwu (yellow card) 26'; Valizade (yellow card) 42'; Oduwa (yellow card) 79'; Rzayev (yellow card) 90'	Stadium: Azersun Arena; Referee: Ingilab Mammadov

15 October 2022 10	Turan Tovuz	2 – 2	Sabail	Tovuz
15:00 AZT (UTC+4)	Eva 9' (pen.); Okebugwu 32' (yellow card) 63'; Xulu (yellow card) 45+1'; Oduwa (yellow card) 54'	Report	Mazurek 12'; Ramazanov (yellow card) 45+1' (goal) 54'	Stadium: City Stadium; Referee: Kamal Umudlu

20 October 2022 11	Qarabağ	3 – 0	Turan Tovuz	Baku
19:00 AZT (UTC+4)	Kwabena 2'; Sheydayev 42' (pen.); Ozobić 53'	Report	S.Guliyev (yellow card) 14'	Stadium: Azersun Arena; Referee: Vuqar Hasanli

28 October 2022 12	Turan Tovuz	1 – 0	Sumgayit	Tovuz
16:00 AZT (UTC+4)	Aliyev (yellow card) 28' (goal) 88'; Najafov (yellow card) 43'; Okebugwu (yellow card) 75'	Report		Stadium: City Stadium; Referee: Nicat İsmayıllı

4 November 2022 13	Turan Tovuz	1 – 3	Shamakhi	Tovuz
15:00 AZT (UTC+4)	Eva 33' (pen.); Masimov (yellow card) 49'; Okebugwu (yellow card) 72'	Report	K.Guliyev 17'; Hüseynli 42'; Bayramov 51'; Teymurov (yellow card) 90'	Stadium: City Stadium; Referee: Rauf Allahverdiyev

9 November 2022 3	Turan Tovuz	0 – 2	Qarabağ	Tovuz
14:30 AZT (UTC+4)		Report	Masimov 20' (o.g.); Kwabena 37'	Stadium: City Stadium; Referee: Tural Qurbanov

13 November 2022 14	Kapaz	0 – 0	Turan Tovuz	Ganja
14:30 AZT (UTC+4)		Report	Seyidov (yellow card) 2'; Najafov (yellow card) 33'; S.Guliyev (yellow card) 90+1'; Ahmadli (yellow card) 90+1'	Stadium: Ganja City Stadium; Referee: Raad Ahmadov

29 November 2022 15	Turan Tovuz	0 – 1	Sabah	Tovuz
14:00 AZT (UTC+4)		Report	Camalov (yellow card) 71'; Kashchuk 80'; J.Nuriyev (yellow card) 86'	Stadium: City Stadium; Referee: Rauf Jabbarov

4 December 2022 16	Zira	2 – 1	Turan Tovuz	Zirə
17:00 AZT (UTC+4)	Luković (yellow card) 12'; Filipe 74'; Bayramov 84' (o.g.)	Report	S.Guliyev (yellow card) 19'; Bagirov (yellow card) 30'; Guseynov 86'	Stadium: Zira Olympic Sport Complex Stadium; Referee: Ingilab Mammadov

15 December 2022 17	Turan Tovuz	0 – 1	Neftçi	Tovuz
14:30 AZT (UTC+4)	Marakvelidze (yellow card) 45+4'; Ahmadli (yellow card) 90'; T.Guliyev (yellow card) 90+5'	Report	Bogomolsky (yellow card) 31'; Buludov (yellow card) 45'; Salahlı (yellow card) 49'; Mahmudov 73' (pen.); Brkić (yellow card) 90+4'	Stadium: City Stadium; Referee: Aliyar Agayev

24 December 2022 18	Gabala	0 – 0	Turan Tovuz	Qabala
15:00 AZT (UTC+4)	Musayev (yellow card) 38'; Ruan (yellow card) 83'; Ramon (yellow card) 86'	Report	Marakvelidze (yellow card) 90+4'	Stadium: City Stadium; Referee: Kamal Umudlu

25 January 2023 19	Turan Tovuz	2 – 3	Qarabağ	Tovuz
14:00 AZT (UTC+4)	Eva (yellow card) 5' (goal) 23'; Marakvelidze (yellow card) 13'; Turabov (yellow card) 76'; Shahverdiyev 86'	Report	Qurbanlı 10'; Sheydayev 28'; Vešović (yellow card) 51'; Mustafazadə 89'; Richard (yellow card) 90+3'; Romão (yellow card) 90+3'	Stadium: City Stadium; Referee: Farid Haciyev

30 January 2023 20	Sumgayit	2 – 1	Turan Tovuz	Sumgait
18:00 AZT (UTC+4)	Todoroski 28'; M.Murata (yellow card) 40'; Abubakar 48' (yellow card) 51'	Report	Oduwa (yellow card) 33'; Eva 40' (yellow card) 84'; Guseynov (yellow card) 86'; Okebugwu (yellow card) 90+3'	Stadium: Kapital Bank Arena; Referee: Rauf Allahverdiyev

6 February 2023 21	Shamakhi	0 – 1	Turan Tovuz	Shamakhi
14:00 AZT (UTC+4)	Dashdamirov (yellow card) 38'; Zamanov (yellow card) 56'	Report	T.Guliyev 55'; Rzayev (yellow card) 62'	Stadium: Shamakhi City Stadium; Referee: Aliyar Ağayev

11 February 2023 22	Turan Tovuz	2 – 0	Kapaz	Tovuz
14:00 AZT (UTC+4)	Aliyev (yellow card) 25'; Xulu (yellow card) 39'; Eva 45+4'; Najafov 48'; Marandici (yellow card) 90+2'	Report	Kvirkvia (yellow card) 35'; Juninho (yellow card) 81'; Sadigli (red card) 86'	Stadium: City Stadium; Referee: Javid Jalilov

19 February 2023 23	Sabah	0 – 2	Turan Tovuz	Masazır
16:30 AZT (UTC+4)	Camalov (yellow card) 35'; Ba (yellow card) 54'; Letić (yellow card) 90+7'	Report	Oduwa 11'; Marakvelidze (yellow card) 25'; Xulu (yellow card) 39'; Guseynov 64'; Najafov (yellow card) 65'; Turabov (yellow card) 73'	Stadium: Bank Respublika Arena; Referee: Kamal Umudlu

24 February 2023 24	Turan Tovuz	0 – 2	Zira	Tovuz
14:00 AZT (UTC+4)	Oduwa (yellow card) 87'; Aliyev (yellow card) 90+5'	Report	Hajili (yellow card) 17'; Adiléhou 27'; Keyta 29'; Kuliyev (yellow card) 67'; Dzhenetov (yellow card) 81'; Abishov (yellow card) 90+3'	Stadium: City Stadium; Referee: Rauf Allahverdiyev

5 March 2023 25	Neftçi	4 – 0	Turan Tovuz	Baku
19:30 AZT (UTC+4)	Meza 20'; Mahmudov 24', 83'; Saldanha 72'	Report	Marandici (yellow card) 55'	Stadium: Bakcell Arena; Referee: Ravan Hamzazada

11 March 2023 26	Turan Tovuz	1 – 1	Gabala	Tovuz
15:00 AZT (UTC+4)	Eva 19' (pen.); Marakvelidze (yellow card) 68'; Bayramov (yellow card) 90+4'	Report	Felipe 39'; Qirtimov (yellow card) 68'; Safarov (yellow card) 90+5'	Stadium: City Stadium; Referee: Rauf Jabarov

16 March 2023 27	Sabail	1 – 1	Turan Tovuz	Baku
16:00 AZT (UTC+4)	Gomis 29'; Ljujić (yellow card) 44'	Report	Valizade (yellow card) 26' (goal) 45'	Stadium: Bayil Arena; Referee: Aliyar Ağayev

31 March 2023 28	Turan Tovuz	2 – 3	Sumgayit	Tovuz
15:30 AZT (UTC+4)	Oduwa 7'; Eva 33'; Marandici (yellow card) 73'; Okebugwu (yellow card) 86'; Shahverdiyev (yellow card) 87'	Report	K.Aliyev 11', 68'; Pereira (yellow card) 47'; Carioca 58' (pen.); Khachayev (yellow card) 87'; Mustafayev (red card) 90+4'	Stadium: City Stadium; Referee: Raad Ahmədov

9 April 2023 29	Turan Tovuz	1 – 1	Shamakhi	Tovuz
16:00 AZT (UTC+4)	Eva 3'; Pusi (yellow card) 63'; Miller (yellow card) 84'	Report	Bayramov 9'; Hüseynli (yellow card) 30'	Stadium: City Stadium; Referee: Ravan Hamzazada

15 April 2023 30	Kapaz	1 – 0	Turan Tovuz	Ganja
16:00 AZT (UTC+4)	Shuaibu 8'; Isaiah (yellow card) 28'; Kvirkvia (yellow card) 52'; Sadigli (yellow card) 68'; Y.Nabiyev (yellow card) 90+2'	Report	Marakvelidze (red card) 38'; T.Guliyev (red card) 90+2'	Stadium: Ganja City Stadium; Referee: Aliyar Ağayev

22 April 2023 31	Turan Tovuz	0 – 2	Sabah	Tovuz
17:00 AZT (UTC+4)	Turabov (yellow card) 86'	Report	Kashchuk 28', 66'; Isayev (yellow card) 84'	Stadium: City Stadium; Referee: Javid Jalilov

1 May 2023 32	Zira	1 – 3	Turan Tovuz	Zirə
20:00 AZT (UTC+4)	Kulach (yellow card) 71'; Brogno 86'; Sadykhov (yellow card) 90+4'	Report	Aliyev 3'; F.Hajiyev (yellow card) 14'; Miller (yellow card) 43' (goal) 60'; Oduwa 58'; Marakvelidze (yellow card) 64'; Marandici (yellow card) 75'; Pusi (yellow card) 88'	Stadium: Zira Olympic Sport Complex Stadium; Referee: Rauf Jabarov

7 May 2023 33	Turan Tovuz	4 – 0	Neftçi	Tovuz
15:00 AZT (UTC+4)	Aliyev (yellow card) 14'; Eva 17', 44', 61'; Miller 21'; Hajiyev (yellow card) 49'; Pusi (yellow card) 90+4'; Turabov (yellow card) 90+4'	Report	Jaber (yellow card) 45+3'; Arveladze (yellow card) 82'; Yusifli (yellow card) 90+4'; Çelik (yellow card) 90+4'	Stadium: City Stadium; Referee: Kamal Umudlu

13 May 2023 34	Gabala	1 – 2	Turan Tovuz	Qabala
18:00 AZT (UTC+4)	Abbasov (yellow card) 53' (yellow-red card) 57'; Alimi (yellow card) 62'; Qirtimov (yellow card) 65'; Utzig 66'; Muradov (yellow card) 90'	Report	S.Guliyev (yellow card) 36' (goal) 54'; Najafov (yellow card) 62'; Xulu 90+5'	Stadium: City Stadium; Referee: Nicat İsmayıllı

22 May 2023 35	Turan Tovuz	2 – 2	Sabail	Tovuz
16:30 AZT (UTC+4)	Muradov (yellow card) 69'; Mazurek 73'; Zakpa 90+3'	Report	Aliyev 3' (yellow card) 69'; Miller (yellow card) 8'; Guseynov 49'	Stadium: City Stadium; Referee: Ravan Hamzazada

28 May 2023 36	Qarabağ	3 – 1	Turan Tovuz	Baku
19:30 AZT (UTC+4)	Xhixha 2'; Andrade 47'; Qurbanlı 72'	Report	Eva 63'; Miller (yellow card) 66'	Stadium: Azersun Arena; Referee: Ali Aliyev

==== League table ====
Pos	Team	Pld	W	D	L	GF	GA	GD	Pts	Qualification
4	Gabala	36	13	11	12	47	47	0	50	Qualification to Europa Conference League second qualifying round
5	Zira	36	13	11	12	45	46	−1	50	
6	Turan Tovuz	36	10	9	17	36	49	−13	39	
7	Sumgayit	36	8	7	21	26	70	−44	31	
8	Kapaz	36	6	13	17	34	62	−28	31	

Source: Soccerway
Rules for classification: 1) Points; 2) Head-to-head points; 3) Head-to-head goal difference; 4) Head-to-head goals scored; 5) Head-to-head away goals scored (only if two teams); 6) Goal difference; 7) Goals scored.

=== Azerbaijan Cup ===
22 November 2022 First Round	Shamakhi	0 – 1	Turan Tovuz	Shamakhi
15:00 AZT (UTC+4)	Haziyev (yellow card) 20'; Hüseynli (yellow card) 54'; Hüseynov (yellow card) 71' (yellow-red card) 82'; Mustafayev (yellow card) 78'; Dashdamirov (yellow card) 90+7'	Report	Turabov (yellow card) 52'; Oduwa (yellow card) 63' (goal) 68'; Guliyev (yellow card) 78'	Stadium: City Stadium; Referee: Vugar Hasanli

9 December 2022 Quarterfinal 1st leg	Kapaz	1 – 2	Turan Tovuz	Ganja
14:00 AZT (UTC+4)	Kantaria (yellow card) 5'; Shuaibu 9'; Akhundov (penalty missed) 34'; Keshavarzi (yellow card) 51'	Report	Shahverdiyev (yellow card) 26' (goal) 64'; Wankewai 51'; Turabov (yellow card) 62'; Oduwa (yellow card) 69'; Hajiyev (yellow card) 87'	Stadium: City Stadium; Referee: Rauf Allahverdiyev

20 December 2022 Quarterfinal 2nd leg	Turan Tovuz	2 – 2 (4 – 3 agg.)	Kapaz	Tovuz
14:00 AZT (UTC+4)	Hajiyev 15'; Najafov 16'; Shahverdiyev (yellow card) 68'; S.Guliyev (yellow card) 90+4'; Eva (yellow card) 90+5'; Ahmadli (yellow card) 90+10'	Report	F.Nabiyev 32', 45+3' (yellow card) 90+6'; Kvirkvia (yellow card) 58'; Isaiah (yellow card) 68'; Akhundov (yellow card) 89'	Stadium: City Stadium; Referee: Kamal Umudlu

19 April 2023 Semifinal 1st leg	Turan Tovuz	1 – 0	Neftçi	Tovuz
16:00 AZT (UTC+4)	Xulu (yellow card) 18'; Najafov (yellow card) 55'; Aliyev (yellow card) 62'; Marandici 74'; Bayramov (yellow card) 90+4'	Report	Stanković (yellow card) 7'; Eddy (yellow card) 30'; Mahmudov (yellow card) 79'	Stadium: City Stadium; Attendance: 5,000; Referee: Rashad Ahmadov

26 April 2023 Semifinal 2nd leg	Neftçi	2 – 0 (2 – 1 agg.)	Turan Tovuz	Baku
20:00 AZT (UTC+4)	Saldanha (yellow card) 56'; Mammadov (yellow card) 81'; Buludov (yellow card) 83'; Mahmudov 90+2'; Saief 90+8'	Report		Stadium: Bakcell Arena; Attendance: 5,000; Referee: Farid Hajiyev

== Squad statistics ==
As of match played 28 May 2023

=== Appearances and goals ===
No.	Pos	Nat	Player	Total		Premier League		Azerbaijan Cup	
No.	Pos	Nat	Player	Apps	Goals	Apps	Goals	Apps	Goals
1	GK	(Azerbaijan) AZE	Tarlan Ahmadli	29	0	26	0	3	0
2	DF	(Panama) PAN	Roderick Miller	8	2	6	2	1+1	0
3	DF	(Azerbaijan) AZE	Tarlan Guliyev	27	1	21+3	1	3	0
4	DF	(Azerbaijan) AZE	Şehriyar Aliyev	37	3	32	3	5	0
5	DF	(Burkina Faso) BFA	Ben Aziz Dao	9	0	6+3	0	0	0
6	MF	(Azerbaijan) AZE	Turan Valizade	29	1	14+11	1	1+3	0
7	MF	(Azerbaijan) AZE	Ehtiram Shahverdiyev	28	2	19+7	1	2	1
8	MF	(Azerbaijan) AZE	Shakir Seyidov	31	0	24+3	0	3+1	0
9	FW	(Albania) ALB	Belajdi Pusi	20	0	10+8	0	1+1	0
10	MF	(Azerbaijan) AZE	Khayal Najafov	38	2	28+5	1	5	1
11	MF	(Russia) RUS	Aykhan Guseynov	35	3	18+13	3	1+3	0
13	GK	(Azerbaijan) AZE	Mehman Hajiyev	2	0	1+1	0	0	0
15	DF	(Azerbaijan) AZE	Vusal Masimov	10	0	3+6	0	1	0
17	MF	(Nigeria) NGR	Nathan Oduwa	32	6	26+2	5	3+1	1
19	FW	(Cameroon) CMR	Rooney Eva	36	17	31	16	5	1
21	MF	(Azerbaijan) AZE	Abbas Aghazade	11	0	1+10	0	0	0
22	FW	(Azerbaijan) AZE	Famil Jamalov	2	0	0+2	0	0	0
23	MF	(Nigeria) NGR	Henry Okebugwu	17	1	8+8	1	1	0
24	MF	(Ghana) GHA	Divine Naah	6	0	1+5	0	0	0
25	DF	(Moldova) MDA	Denis Marandici	17	1	16	0	1	1
30	MF	(Georgia (country)) GEO	Piruz Marakvelidze	22	0	17+1	0	4	0
33	DF	(Azerbaijan) AZE	Eltun Turabov	26	0	19+4	0	2+1	0
39	DF	(Azerbaijan) AZE	Sadig Guliyev	25	1	14+6	1	3+2	0
44	MF	(Azerbaijan) AZE	Elçin Qasımov	1	0	0+1	0	0	0
55	DF	(South Africa) RSA	Siyanda Xulu	27	1	22+3	1	2	0
60	MF	(Azerbaijan) AZE	Sabayel Bagirov	14	0	3+9	0	0+2	0
77	MF	(Azerbaijan) AZE	Javid Taghiyev	11	0	1+10	0	0	0
83	DF	(Azerbaijan) AZE	Hüseyn Hüseynov	1	0	0+1	0	0	0
85	GK	(Azerbaijan) AZE	Kamal Bayramov	11	0	9	0	2	0
88	DF	(Azerbaijan) AZE	Faig Hajiyev	16	1	9+3	0	3+1	1
97	DF	(Azerbaijan) AZE	Sadig Şafiyev	1	0	0+1	0	0	0
99	MF	(Azerbaijan) AZE	Veysal Rzayev	27	0	8+16	0	2+1	0
Players away on loan:
Players who left Turan Tovuz during the season:
9	FW	(Georgia (country)) GEO	Imeda Ashortia	15	0	3+10	0	0+2	0

=== Goal scorers ===
Place	Position	Nation	Number	Name	Premier League	Azerbaijan Cup	Total
1	FW	(Cameroon)	19	Rooney Eva	16	1	17
2	MF	(Nigeria)	17	Nathan Oduwa	5	1	6
3	DF	(Azerbaijan)	4	Şehriyar Aliyev	3	0	3
3	MF	(Russia)	11	Aykhan Guseynov	3	0	3
5	DF	(Panama)	2	Roderick Miller	2	0	2
5	MF	(Azerbaijan)	7	Ehtiram Shahverdiyev	1	1	2
5	MF	(Azerbaijan)	10	Khayal Najafov	1	1	2
8	MF	(Nigeria)	23	Henry Okebugwu	1	0	1
8	DF	(Azerbaijan)	3	Tarlan Guliyev	1	0	1
8	MF	(Azerbaijan)	6	Turan Valizade	1	0	1
8	DF	(Azerbaijan)	39	Sadig Guliyev	1	0	1
8	DF	(South Africa)	55	Siyanda Xulu	1	0	1
8	DF	(Azerbaijan)	88	Faig Hajiyev	0	1	1
8	DF	(Moldova)	25	Denis Marandici	0	1	1
				TOTALS	36	6	42

=== Clean sheets ===
Place	Position	Nation	Number	Name	Premier League	Azerbaijan Cup	Total
1	GK	(Azerbaijan)	1	Tarlan Ahmadli	10	1	11
2	GK	(Azerbaijan)	85	Kamal Bayramov	2	1	3
				TOTALS	12	2	14

=== Disciplinary record ===
Number	Nation	Position	Name	Premier League		Azerbaijan Cup		Total	
Number	Nation	Position	Name	Yellow card	Red card	Yellow card	Red card	Yellow card	Red card
1	(Azerbaijan)	GK	Tarlan Ahmadli	2	0	1	0	3	0
2	(Panama)	DF	Roderick Miller	4	0	0	0	4	0
3	(Azerbaijan)	DF	Tarlan Guliyev	1	1	1	0	2	1
4	(Azerbaijan)	DF	Şehriyar Aliyev	6	0	1	0	7	0
6	(Azerbaijan)	MF	Turan Valizade	3	0	0	0	3	0
7	(Azerbaijan)	MF	Ehtiram Shahverdiyev	2	0	2	0	4	0
8	(Azerbaijan)	MF	Shakir Seyidov	3	1	0	0	3	1
9	(Albania)	FW	Belajdi Pusi	2	0	0	0	2	0
10	(Azerbaijan)	MF	Khayal Najafov	4	0	1	0	5	0
11	(Russia)	MF	Aykhan Guseynov	1	0	0	0	1	0
15	(Azerbaijan)	DF	Vusal Masimov	1	0	0	0	1	0
17	(Nigeria)	MF	Nathan Oduwa	5	0	2	0	7	0
19	(Cameroon)	FW	Rooney Eva	2	0	1	0	3	0
23	(Nigeria)	MF	Henry Okebugwu	6	0	0	0	6	0
25	(Moldova)	DF	Denis Marandici	4	0	0	0	4	0
30	(Georgia (country))	MF	Piruz Marakvelidze	6	2	0	0	6	2
33	(Azerbaijan)	DF	Eltun Turabov	5	0	2	0	7	0
39	(Azerbaijan)	DF	Sadig Guliyev	5	0	1	0	6	0
55	(South Africa)	DF	Siyanda Xulu	3	0	1	0	4	0
60	(Azerbaijan)	MF	Sabayel Bagirov	1	0	0	0	1	0
85	(Azerbaijan)	GK	Kamal Bayramov	1	0	1	0	2	0
88	(Azerbaijan)	DF	Faig Hajiyev	2	0	1	0	3	0
99	(Azerbaijan)	MF	Veysal Rzayev	2	0	0	0	2	0
Players who left Turan Tovuz during the season:
			TOTALS	71	4	15	0	86	4
