= 2022–23 Azerbaijan Cup =

Tournament details
- Country: Azerbaijan
- Teams: 14

Final positions
- Champions: Gabala
- Runners-up: Neftçi

Tournament statistics
- Matches played: 18
- Goals scored: 50 (2.78 per match)
- All statistics correct as of 3 June 2023.

The 2022–23 Azerbaijan Cup was the 31st season of the annual cup competition in Azerbaijan, with Premier League side Qarabağ being the defending champions from the 2021–22 season.

== Teams ==
| Round | Clubs remaining | Clubs involved | Winners from previous round | New entries this round | Leagues entering at this round |
|---|---|---|---|---|---|
| First Round | 14 | 12 | None | 12 | 4 Azerbaijan First Division teams 8 Azerbaijan Premier League teams |
| Quarterfinals | 8 | 8 | 6 | 2 | 2 Azerbaijan Premier League teams |
| Semifinals | 4 | 4 | 4 | none | none |
| Final | 2 | 2 | 2 | none | none |

== First round ==
On 23 November, the AFFA published the list of referee appointments for the First Round games.

| 22 November 2022 1 | Gabala | 5 – 0 | Araz | Qabala |
| 15:00 AZT (UTC+4) | Isayev 29'; Ramon 56'; Alimi 60'; Felipe 63'; Isgandarov 74' | Report | Rustamov (yellow card) 90+1' | Stadium: City Stadium; Referee: Kamranbey Rahimov |

| 22 November 2022 2 | MOIK Baku | 0 – 4 | Sabail | Baku |
| 14:00 AZT (UTC+4) | | Report | Mazurek 18'; Garahmadov 30'; Stasyuk (yellow card) 53'; Abdullayev (yellow card) 60'; Abbasov 75'; Chekh 90' | Stadium: Bine Stadium; Referee: Ali Aliyev |

| 23 November 2022 3 | Sabah | 5 – 0 | Qaradağ Lökbatan | Masazır |
| 17:00 AZT (UTC+4) | Mickels (yellow card) 29'; Volkovi 33'; Həsənalızadə 38'; Apeh 62', 88', 90+1'; Camalov (yellow card) 66' | Report | Mammadov (yellow card) 35'; Jafarov 47' | Stadium: Bank Respublika Arena; Referee: Sabuhi Bayramov |

| 23 November 2022 4 | Energetik | 0 – 2 | Zira | Mingachevir |
| 14:00 AZT (UTC+4) | | Report | Chantakias 30'; Akhmedzade 60' | Stadium: Yashar Mammadzade Stadium; Referee: Emin Aliyev |

| 22 November 2022 5 | Shamakhi | 0 – 1 | Turan Tovuz | Shamakhi |
| 15:00 AZT (UTC+4) | Haziyev (yellow card) 20'; Hüseynli (yellow card) 54'; Hüseynov (yellow card) 71' (yellow-red card) 82'; Mustafayev (yellow card) 78'; Dashdamirov (yellow card) 90+7' | Report | Turabov (yellow card) 52'; Oduwa (yellow card) 63' (goal) 68'; Guliyev (yellow card) 78' | Stadium: City Stadium; Referee: Vugar Hasanli |

| 23 November 2022 6 | Kapaz | 1 – 0 | Sumgayit | Ganja |
| 14:00 AZT (UTC+4) | Ergemlidze 9'; Kantaria (yellow card) 49'; Z.Aliyev (yellow card) 83'; Sadigli (yellow card) 90+7' | Report | Mustafayev (yellow card) 67'; Chaby (yellow card) 90+3'; Isgandarli (yellow card) 90+5' | Stadium: City Stadium; Referee: Inqilab Mammadov |

== Quarterfinals ==
On 7 December, the AFFA published the list of referee appointments for the first legs of the Quarterfinals.

| 8 December 2022 7 1st leg | Zira | 1 – 0 | Neftçi | Zirə |
| 18:00 AZT (UTC+4) | Hajili (yellow card) 46'; Muradov (yellow card) 49'; Sadykhov 54'; Alıyev (yellow card) 83' | Report | Jaber (yellow card) 75' | Stadium: Zira Olympic Sport Complex Stadium; Referee: Ravan Hamzazade |

| 20 December 2022 7 2nd leg | Neftçi | 3 – 1 (a.e.t.) (3 – 2 agg.) | Zira | Baku |
| 19:00 AZT (UTC+4) | Bogomolsky 3'; Mahmudov 45+1'; Eddy (yellow card) 54'; Arveladze (yellow card) 60'; Saief 95'; Pato (yellow card) 101'; Brkić (yellow card) 105+2'; Asgarov (yellow card) 115'; Jafarov (yellow card) 116' | Report | Alkhasov (yellow card) 27'; Khalilzade (yellow card) 72' (yellow-red card) 120+1'; Brogno 89'; Keyta (penalty missed) 110'; Hajili (yellow card) 120+1' (yellow-red card) 120+2' | Stadium: Bakcell Arena; Referee: Javid Jəlilov |

| 8 December 2022 8 1st leg | Qarabağ | 2 – 2 | Gabala | Baku |
| 20:30 AZT (UTC+4) | Qurbanlı 55', 83' | Report | Safarov 25'; Alimi (yellow card) 74'; Hani (yellow card) 83' (goal) 86' | Stadium: Azersun Arena; Referee: Aliyar Agayev |

| 19 December 2022 8 2nd leg | Gabala | 1 – 0 (3 – 2 agg.) | Qarabağ | Qabala |
| 16:00 AZT (UTC+4) | Alimi (yellow card) 16'; Safarov (yellow card) 23'; Qirtimov (yellow card) 35'; Ramon (yellow card) 61' (goal) 71' | Report | A.Hüseynov (yellow card) 50'; Richard (yellow card) 82'; Mammadov (yellow card) 90+3' | Stadium: City Stadium; Referee: Inqilab Mammadov |

| 9 December 2022 9 1st leg | Kapaz | 1 – 2 | Turan Tovuz | Ganja |
| 14:00 AZT (UTC+4) | Kantaria (yellow card) 5'; Shuaibu 9'; Akhundov (penalty missed) 34'; Keshavarzi (yellow card) 51' | Report | Shahverdiyev (yellow card) 26' (goal) 64'; Wankewai 51'; Turabov (yellow card) 62'; Oduwa (yellow card) 69'; Hajiyev (yellow card) 87' | Stadium: City Stadium; Referee: Rauf Allahverdiyev |

| 20 December 2022 9 2nd leg | Turan Tovuz | 2 – 2 (4 – 3 agg.) | Kapaz | Tovuz |
| 14:00 AZT (UTC+4) | Hajiyev 15'; Najafov 16'; Shahverdiyev (yellow card) 68'; S.Guliyev (yellow card) 90+4'; Eva (yellow card) 90+5'; Ahmadli (yellow card) 90+10' | Report | F.Nabiyev 32', 45+3' (yellow card) 90+6'; Kvirkvia (yellow card) 58'; Isaiah (yellow card) 68'; Akhundov (yellow card) 89' | Stadium: City Stadium; Referee: Kamal Umudlu |

| 9 December 2022 10 1st leg | Sabail | 3 – 2 | Sabah | Baku |
| 17:00 AZT (UTC+4) | Kizito 32'; Mazurek 62', 72' | Report | Mehbaliyev (red card) 12'; Ba (yellow card) 36'; Letić (yellow card) 45+1'; Camalov (yellow card) 58'; Ceballos 80'; Volkovi 90+4' | Stadium: Bayil Arena; Referee: Nijat Ismayilli |

| 19 December 2022 10 2nd leg | Sabah | 0 – 1 (2 – 4 agg.) | Sabail | Masazır |
| 19:00 AZT (UTC+4) | Mickels (yellow card) 45+1' | Report | Taghiyev (yellow card) 45+3'; Zakpa 74'; Gurbanli (yellow card) 89' | Stadium: Bank Respublika Arena; Referee: Elçin Masiyev |

== Semi–finals ==
| 18 April 2023 1st leg | Gabala | 3 – 2 | Sabail | Qabala |
| 18:00 AZT (UTC+4) | Mammadov (yellow card) 30'; Utzig 34', 66'; Abbasov (yellow card) 44'; Santos 74' | Report | Martinov (yellow card) 7' (goal) 21'; Muradov 9' | Stadium: City Stadium; Attendance: 1,300; Referee: Elchin Masiyev |

| 27 April 2023 2nd leg | Sabail | 0 – 1 (2 – 4 agg.) | Gabala | Baku |
| 20:00 AZT (UTC+4) | Hasanov (yellow card) 28' (yellow-red card) 47'; Naghiyev (yellow card) 63' (yellow-red card) 90+5'; Gomis (yellow card) 68'; Ljujić (yellow card) 75'; França (yellow card) 78' (yellow-red card) 90+1' | Report | Alimi 48' (pen.) (yellow card) 75'; Utzig (yellow card) 73'; Abu Akel (yellow card) 90+1'; Mammadov (yellow card) 90+2' | Stadium: Bayil Arena; Attendance: 1,300; Referee: Aliyar Agayev |

| 19 April 2023 1st leg | Turan Tovuz | 1 – 0 | Neftçi | Tovuz |
| 16:00 AZT (UTC+4) | Xulu (yellow card) 18'; Najafov (yellow card) 55'; Aliyev (yellow card) 62'; Marandici 74'; Bayramov (yellow card) 90+4' | Report | Stanković (yellow card) 7'; Eddy (yellow card) 30'; Mahmudov (yellow card) 79' | Stadium: City Stadium; Attendance: 5,000; Referee: Rashad Ahmadov |

| 26 April 2023 2nd leg | Neftçi | 2 – 0 (2 – 1 agg.) | Turan Tovuz | Baku |
| 20:00 AZT (UTC+4) | Saldanha (yellow card) 56'; Mammadov (yellow card) 81'; Buludov (yellow card) 83'; Mahmudov 90+2'; Saief 90+8' | Report | | Stadium: Bakcell Arena; Attendance: 5,000; Referee: Farid Hajiyev |

== Final ==
| 3 June 2023 | Neftçi | 0 – 1 (a.e.t.) | Gabala | Baku |
| 20:00 AZT (UTC+4) | Eddy (yellow card) 65'; Kvirkvelia (yellow card) 65'; Haghverdi (yellow card) 108' | Report | Isayev (yellow card) 65'; Allach (yellow card) 65'; Alimi 102' (yellow card) 120' | Stadium: Bakcell Arena; Referee: Inqilab Mammadov |

== Scorers ==
As of match played 3 June 2023

3 goals:

- (Albania) Isnik Alimi - Gabala
- (Nigeria) Emmanuel Apeh - Sabah

2 goals:

- (Brazil) Ramon - Gabala
- (Brazil) Felipe Santos - Gabala
- (Brazil) Raphael Utzig - Gabala
- (Azerbaijan) Farid Nabiyev - Kapaz
- (Azerbaijan) Emin Mahmudov - Neftçi
- (United States) Kenny Saief - Neftçi
- (Azerbaijan) Musa Qurbanlı - Qarabağ
- (Georgia (country)) Davit Volkovi - Sabah
- (Argentina) Franco Mazurek - Sabail

1 goals:

- (Azerbaijan) Magsad Isayev - Gabala
- (Azerbaijan) Ulvi Isgandarov - Gabala
- (Azerbaijan) Emil Safarov - Gabala
- (Jordan) Omar Hani - Gabala
- (Georgia (country)) Mikheil Ergemlidze - Kapaz
- (Nigeria) Abdullahi Shuaibu - Kapaz
- (Belarus) Yegor Bogomolsky - Neftçi
- (Azerbaijan) Bəxtiyar Həsənalızadə - Sabah
- (Spain) Cristian Ceballos - Sabah
- (Argentina) Franco Mazurek - Sabail
- (Azerbaijan) Mirabdulla Abbasov - Sabail
- (Azerbaijan) Adilkhan Garahmadov - Sabail
- (Azerbaijan) Ilkin Muradov - Sabail
- (Bulgaria) Emil Martinov - Sabail
- (Ivory Coast) Goba Zakpa - Sabail
- (Uganda) Luwagga Kizito - Sabail
- (Ukraine) Maksym Chekh - Sabail
- (Azerbaijan) Faig Hajiyev - Turan Tovuz
- (Azerbaijan) Khayal Najafov - Turan Tovuz
- (Azerbaijan) Ehtiram Shahverdiyev - Turan Tovuz
- (Cameroon) Rooney Wankewai - Turan Tovuz
- (Moldova) Denis Marandici - Turan Tovuz
- (Nigeria) Nathan Oduwa - Turan Tovuz
- (Azerbaijan) Rustam Akhmedzade - Zira
- (Azerbaijan) Ragim Sadykhov - Zira
- (Belgium) Loris Brogno - Zira
- (Greece) Dimitrios Chantakias - Zira

== See also ==
- 2022–23 Azerbaijan Premier League
- 2022–23 Azerbaijan First Division
