= List of Azerbaijan football transfers summer 2019 =

This is a list of Azerbaijan football transfers in the summer transfer window, 11 June - 2 September 2019, by club. Only clubs of the 2019–20 Azerbaijan Premier League are included.

== Azerbaijan Premier League 2019-20 ==
=== Gabala ===
In: Note: Flags indicate national team as defined under FIFA eligibility rules; some limited exceptions apply. Players may hold more than one non-FIFA nationality.

No.	Pos.	Nation	Player
3	DF	CRO	Ivica Žunić (from (Kazakhstan) Atyrau)
4	DF	AZE	Sadig Guliyev (from (Azerbaijan) Zira)
6	MF	AZE	Kamal Mirzayev (from (Azerbaijan) Zira)
10	FW	MOZ	Clésio Baúque (from (Turkey) İstanbulspor)
13	FW	CIV	Christian Kouakou (from (Czech Republic) Karviná)
14	FW	AZE	Ulvi Isgandarov (loan return from (Azerbaijan) Sumgayit)
21	MF	ESP	Fernań López (from (Spain) Barakaldo)
28	DF	AZE	Murad Musayev (from (Azerbaijan) Zira)
74	DF	AZE	Yusif Nabiyev (loan return from (Azerbaijan) Sumgayit)
77	MF	GEO	Merab Gigauri (from (Georgia (country)) Torpedo Kutaisi)
94	GK	AZE	Tarlan Ahmadli (from (Azerbaijan) Sabah)
—	MF	SEN	Ibrahima Niasse (from (Morocco) Raja Casablanca)

Out: Note: Flags indicate national team as defined under FIFA eligibility rules; some limited exceptions apply. Players may hold more than one non-FIFA nationality.

No.	Pos.	Nation	Player
3	DF	SRB	Vojislav Stanković (to (Azerbaijan) Neftçi Baku)
4	MF	AZE	Elvin Jamalov (to (Azerbaijan) Zira)
6	MF	AZE	Kamal Mirzayev (to (Kuwait) Al-Salmiya)
10	FW	AZE	Rauf Aliyev (to (Azerbaijan) Neftçi Baku)
14	MF	AZE	Javid Huseynov (to (Azerbaijan) Zira)
17	FW	NGA	James Adeniyi (loan to (Israel) Hapoel Kiryat Shmona)
18	DF	AZE	Ilgar Gurbanov (to (Azerbaijan) Sumgayit)
21	MF	TOG	Lalawélé Atakora (to (Kuwait) Kazma)
22	GK	UKR	Dmytro Bezotosnyi (to (Ukraine) Chornomorets Odesa)
27	DF	AZE	Bahlul Mustafazade (to (Azerbaijan) Sabah)
28	FW	FRA	Steeven Joseph-Monrose (to (Azerbaijan) Neftçi Baku)
34	DF	AZE	Urfan Abbasov (to (Azerbaijan) Sabail)
35	GK	AZE	Murad Popov
77	MF	AZE	Samir Gurbanov (loan to (Czech Republic) Viktoria Žižkov)
88	MF	ALB	Sabien Lilaj (to (Israel) Sektzia Tziona)
99	MF	AZE	Abbas Aghazade (to (Azerbaijan) Sabah)

=== Keşla ===
In: Note: Flags indicate national team as defined under FIFA eligibility rules; some limited exceptions apply. Players may hold more than one non-FIFA nationality.

No.	Pos.	Nation	Player
1	GK	MDA	Stanislav Namașco (from (Montenegro) Zeta)
2	DF	AZE	Ilkin Qirtimov (from (Azerbaijan) Zira)
5	DF	ARG	Franco Flores (from (Cyprus) Alki Oroklini)
7	MF	AZE	Tural Bayramli (from (Latvia) Daugavpils)
8	MF	AZE	Zija Azizov (from (Netherlands) NEC Nijmegen)
9	FW	PAR	Lorenzo Frutos (from (Venezuela) Deportivo Lara)
10	MF	PAR	César Meza Colli (loan from (Romania) Universitatea Craiova)
11	FW	AZE	Ruslan Gurbanov (from (Azerbaijan) Sabail)
14	MF	AZE	Emin Mehdiyev (Free agent)
21	DF	MNE	Mijuško Bojović (from (Hungary) Újpest)
22	MF	AZE	Afran Ismayilov (from (Azerbaijan) Sumgayit)
94	GK	AZE	Rashad Azizli (from (Azerbaijan) Sumgayit)

Out: Note: Flags indicate national team as defined under FIFA eligibility rules; some limited exceptions apply. Players may hold more than one non-FIFA nationality.

No.	Pos.	Nation	Player
1	GK	AZE	Kamran Aghayev
2	DF	AZE	Sertan Tashkin (to (Azerbaijan) Sumgayit)
3	DF	BRA	Denis Silva
8	MF	AZE	Seymur Asadov
9	FW	AZE	Amil Yunanov (to (Azerbaijan) Sumgayit)
10	FW	AZE	Ruslan Nasirli
14	FW	JAM	Andre Clennon (to (Jamaica) Humble Lions)
17	MF	AZE	Samir Masimov (to (Russia) Olimp Khimki)
21	MF	VEN	Ángelo Peña (to (Venezuela) Deportivo La Guaira)
22	MF	SRB	Nikola Mitrović (to (Hungary) Zalaegerszegi)
23	FW	TOG	Jonathan Ayité (to (Cyprus) Olympiakos)
24	MF	AZE	Fuad Bayramov (to (Georgia (country)) Rustavi)
30	GK	AZE	Davud Karimi
32	MF	UKR	Valeriy Kutsenko (to (Ukraine) Avanhard Kramatorsk)
93	DF	LTU	Edvinas Girdvainis (to (Latvia) Rīgas FS)

=== Neftchi Baku ===
In: Note: Flags indicate national team as defined under FIFA eligibility rules; some limited exceptions apply. Players may hold more than one non-FIFA nationality.

No.	Pos.	Nation	Player
6	DF	SRB	Vojislav Stanković (from (Azerbaijan) Gabala)
10	MF	BRA	Dário (from (South Korea) Daegu)
19	FW	AZE	Rauf Aliyev (from (Azerbaijan) Gabala)
28	FW	FRA	Steeven Joseph-Monrose (from (Azerbaijan) Gabala)
77	MF	HAI	Donald Guerrier (from (Azerbaijan) Qarabağ)

Out: Note: Flags indicate national team as defined under FIFA eligibility rules; some limited exceptions apply. Players may hold more than one non-FIFA nationality.

No.	Pos.	Nation	Player
4	DF	MDA	Petru Racu (to (Romania) Petrolul Ploiești)
6	MF	CRO	Goran Paracki (to (Croatia) Slaven Belupo)
15	DF	AZE	Ruslan Abışov (to (Azerbaijan) Sabah)
16	FW	ITA	Gianluca Sansone (to (Italy) Audace Cerignola)
21	DF	AZE	Mahammad Mirzabeyov (to (Azerbaijan) Sabah)
22	FW	AZE	Mirabdulla Abbasov (loan to (Azerbaijan) Sabail)
70	MF	AZE	Ali Shirinov (to (Latvia) Daugavpils)
—	FW	GHA	Kwame Karikari (to (Georgia (country)) Dinamo Tbilisi, previously on loan from (United Arab Emirates) Al Urooba)

=== Qarabağ ===
In: Note: Flags indicate national team as defined under FIFA eligibility rules; some limited exceptions apply. Players may hold more than one non-FIFA nationality.

No.	Pos.	Nation	Player
1	GK	BIH	Asmir Begović (loan from (England) Bournemouth)
3	DF	BRA	Ailton Silva (loan from (Germany) VfB Stuttgart)
9	MF	ESP	Jaime Romero (from (Spain) Córdoba)
23	DF	MAR	Faycal Rherras (from (France) Béziers)
99	FW	SEN	Magaye Gueye (from (Turkey) Osmanlıspor)

Out: Note: Flags indicate national team as defined under FIFA eligibility rules; some limited exceptions apply. Players may hold more than one non-FIFA nationality.

No.	Pos.	Nation	Player
7	FW	SUI	Innocent Emeghara (to (Turkey) Karagümrük)
28	FW	CGO	Dzon Delarge (to (Czech Republic) České Budějovice)
44	MF	AZE	Elvin Jafarguliyev (loan to (Azerbaijan) Sumgayit)
52	DF	POL	Jakub Rzeźniczak (to (Poland) Wisła Płock)
70	MF	AZE	Nijat Suleymanov (loan to (Azerbaijan) Zira)
77	MF	HAI	Donald Guerrier (to (Azerbaijan) Neftçi)
94	GK	AZE	Nijat Mehbaliyev (loan to (Azerbaijan) Sumgayit)
99	FW	BRA	Reynaldo (to (Kazakhstan) Irtysh)

=== Sabah ===
In: Note: Flags indicate national team as defined under FIFA eligibility rules; some limited exceptions apply. Players may hold more than one non-FIFA nationality.

No.	Pos.	Nation	Player
4	DF	AZE	Bahlul Mustafazade (from (Azerbaijan) Gabala)
9	FW	MLI	Ulysse Diallo (from (Hungary) MTK Budapest)
15	DF	AZE	Ruslan Abışov (from (Azerbaijan) Neftçi Baku)
17	DF	AZE	Mahammad Mirzabeyov (from (Azerbaijan) Neftçi Baku)
19	FW	HON	Roger Rojas (from (Costa Rica) Alajuelense)
20	MF	RUS	Anar Panayev (from (Russia) Anzhi Makhachkala)
23	FW	GUI	Amadou Diallo (from (France) Red Star)
26	MF	AZE	Ozan Kökçü (from (Turkey) Giresunspor)
27	MF	RSA	Hendrick Ekstein (from (South Africa) Kaizer Chiefs)
28	FW	CGO	Kévin Koubemba (from (Azerbaijan) Sabail)
77	MF	AZE	Javid Taghiyev (from (Azerbaijan) Sumgayit)
98	GK	UKR	Oleg Karnaukh (from (Russia) TSK-Tavria)
99	MF	AZE	Abbas Aghazade (from (Azerbaijan) Gabala)

Out: Note: Flags indicate national team as defined under FIFA eligibility rules; some limited exceptions apply. Players may hold more than one non-FIFA nationality.

No.	Pos.	Nation	Player
1	GK	AZE	Tarlan Ahmadli (to (Azerbaijan) Gabala)
4	MF	AZE	Tarzin Jahangirov
9	FW	UKR	Marko Dević (to (Serbia) Voždovac)
11	MF	AZE	Elgun Nabiyev (loan to (Azerbaijan) Sumgayit)
15	MF	PAR	Éric Ramos (to (Paraguay) Independiente)
21	DF	AZE	Novruz Mammadov (to (Azerbaijan) Kapaz)
22	MF	SRB	Miloš Bosančić (to (Serbia) Voždovac)
25	DF	BRA	Wanderson
33	MF	AZE	Eltun Turabov (loan to (Albania) Bylis Ballsh)

=== Sabail ===
In: Note: Flags indicate national team as defined under FIFA eligibility rules; some limited exceptions apply. Players may hold more than one non-FIFA nationality.

No.	Pos.	Nation	Player
3	DF	AZE	Turan Manafov (from (Azerbaijan) Zagatala)
9	MF	AZE	Mirsahib Abbasov (from (Azerbaijan) Zira)
11	MF	FRA	Dylan Duventru (from (Azerbaijan) Zira)
12	GK	MKD	Daniel Bozhinovski (from (North Macedonia) Rabotnički)
21	DF	BRA	Erico Silva (from (Romania) Astra Giurgiu)
22	FW	AZE	Mirabdulla Abbasov (loan from (Azerbaijan) Neftçi Baku)
34	DF	AZE	Urfan Abbasov (from (Azerbaijan) Gabala)
55	DF	AZE	Adil Naghiyev (from (Azerbaijan) Sumgayit)
85	GK	AZE	Kamal Bayramov (from (Azerbaijan) Zira)
91	MF	ALG	Bilal Hamdi (from (Azerbaijan) Zira)

Out: Note: Flags indicate national team as defined under FIFA eligibility rules; some limited exceptions apply. Players may hold more than one non-FIFA nationality.

No.	Pos.	Nation	Player
3	DF	GEO	Tamaz Tsetskhladze (to (Georgia (country)) Torpedo Kutaisi)
4	DF	BRA	Henrique Moura (to (Sweden) GAIS)
9	FW	ARG	Imanol Iriberri (to (Malta) Hibernians)
11	FW	AZE	Ruslan Gurbanov (to (Azerbaijan) Keşla)
11	MF	FRA	Dylan Duventru (to (Cyprus) Olympiakos)
12	GK	MKD	Daniel Bozhinovski (to (North Macedonia) Sileks)
21	FW	NGA	Oke Akpoveta (to (Sweden) Frej)
27	MF	BUL	Emil Martinov (to (Bulgaria) Arda Kardzhali)
28	FW	CGO	Kévin Koubemba (to (Azerbaijan) Sabah)
33	DF	MKD	Tome Kitanovski (to (Albania) Kukësi)
91	MF	ALG	Bilal Hamdi (to (Cyprus) Olympiakos)
99	DF	GNB	Maudo Jarjué (to Austria Wien)

=== Sumgayit ===
In: Note: Flags indicate national team as defined under FIFA eligibility rules; some limited exceptions apply. Players may hold more than one non-FIFA nationality.

No.	Pos.	Nation	Player
5	DF	RUS	Dzhamaldin Khodzhaniyazov (from (Belarus) BATE Borisov)
6	MF	AZE	Vugar Mustafayev (from (Azerbaijan) Zira)
9	FW	AZE	Amil Yunanov (from (Azerbaijan) Keşla)
11	MF	AZE	Elgun Nabiyev (loan from (Azerbaijan) Sabah)
12	GK	AZE	Nijat Mehbaliyev (loan from (Azerbaijan) Qarabağ)
22	DF	AZE	Sertan Tashkin (from (Azerbaijan) Keşla)
42	FW	AZE	Elnur Jafarov (Free agent)
44	MF	AZE	Elvin Jafarguliyev (loan from (Azerbaijan) Qarabağ)
50	DF	AZE	Ilgar Gurbanov (from (Azerbaijan) Gabala)
70	FW	IRN	Mehdi Sharifi (from (Iran) Persepolis)
90	MF	AZE	Rahim Sadykhov (from (Russia) Torpedo Moscow)

Out: Note: Flags indicate national team as defined under FIFA eligibility rules; some limited exceptions apply. Players may hold more than one non-FIFA nationality.

No.	Pos.	Nation	Player
5	DF	AZE	Adil Naghiyev (to (Azerbaijan) Sabail)
7	MF	AZE	Javid Taghiyev (to (Azerbaijan) Sabah)
11	FW	TUR	Atilla Yıldırım
12	GK	AZE	Rashad Azizli (to (Azerbaijan) Keşla)
17	MF	AZE	Nijat Gurbanov (to (Georgia (country)) Samtredia)
21	DF	AZE	Arif Dashdemirov
22	MF	AZE	Afran Ismayilov (to (Azerbaijan) Keşla)
44	DF	AZE	Gvanzav Mahammadov
60	MF	AZE	Elvin Mammadov (to (Azerbaijan) Zira)
70	FW	AZE	Ulvi Isgandarov (loan return to (Azerbaijan) Gabala)
74	DF	AZE	Yusif Nabiyev (loan return to (Azerbaijan) Gabala)
99	MF	AZE	Eli Babayev (to (Israel) Maccabi Petah Tikva)

=== Zira ===
In: Note: Flags indicate national team as defined under FIFA eligibility rules; some limited exceptions apply. Players may hold more than one non-FIFA nationality.

No.	Pos.	Nation	Player
4	MF	AZE	Elvin Jamalov (from (Azerbaijan) Gabala)
5	DF	GRE	Anastasios Papazoglou (from (Greece) OFI)
6	DF	PER	Álvaro Ampuero (from (Peru) Deportivo Municipal)
7	MF	AZE	Javid Huseynov (from (Azerbaijan) Gabala)
10	MF	AZE	Elvin Mammadov (from (Azerbaijan) Sumgayit)
11	MF	HAI	Sony Norde (from (India) Mohun Bagan)
25	DF	MNE	Miloš Bakrač (from (Montenegro) OFK Titograd)
28	GK	MNE	Bojan Zogović (from (Serbia) Bačka)
70	MF	AZE	Nijat Suleymanov (loan from (Azerbaijan) Qarabağ)

Out: Note: Flags indicate national team as defined under FIFA eligibility rules; some limited exceptions apply. Players may hold more than one non-FIFA nationality.

No.	Pos.	Nation	Player
2	DF	AZE	Ilkin Qirtimov (to (Azerbaijan) Keşla)
3	MF	AZE	Budag Nasirov (loan return to (Portugal) Sporting Lisbon)
6	MF	AZE	Vugar Mustafayev (to (Azerbaijan) Sumgayit)
7	FW	AZE	Pardis Fardjad-Azad (to (Germany) Viktoria Berlin)
8	MF	AZE	Kamal Mirzayev (to (Azerbaijan) Gabala)
9	MF	MDA	Alexandru Dedov (to (Moldova) Petrocub)
10	MF	MLI	Sadio Tounkara
11	MF	FRA	Dylan Duventru (to (Azerbaijan) Sabail)
13	DF	AZE	Murad Musayev (to (Azerbaijan) Gabala)
20	FW	CIV	Ismaël Fofana
26	DF	SRB	Miloš Radivojević (to (Croatia) Slaven Belupo)
39	DF	AZE	Sadig Guliyev (to (Azerbaijan) Gabala)
77	MF	AZE	Mirsahib Abbasov (to (Azerbaijan) Sabail)
85	GK	AZE	Kamal Bayramov (to (Azerbaijan) Sabail)
91	MF	ALG	Bilal Hamdi (to (Azerbaijan) Sabail)
98	MF	AZE	Agshin Guluzade
