= List of Azerbaijan football transfers winter 2024–25 =

This is a list of Azerbaijan football transfers in the winter transfer window, which takes place between 14 January and 10 February, by club. Only clubs of the 2024–25 Azerbaijan Premier League are included.

== Azerbaijan Premier League 2024-25 ==
=== Araz-Naxçıvan ===
In: Note: Flags indicate national team as defined under FIFA eligibility rules; some limited exceptions apply. Players may hold more than one non-FIFA nationality.

| No. | Pos. | Nation | Player |
|---|---|---|---|
| 45 | MF | (Morocco) MAR | Ayyoub Allach (from (Moldova) Sheriff Tiraspol) |

Out: Note: Flags indicate national team as defined under FIFA eligibility rules; some limited exceptions apply. Players may hold more than one non-FIFA nationality.

| No. | Pos. | Nation | Player |

=== Kapaz ===
In: Note: Flags indicate national team as defined under FIFA eligibility rules; some limited exceptions apply. Players may hold more than one non-FIFA nationality.

| No. | Pos. | Nation | Player |
|---|---|---|---|
| 11 | FW | (Malta) MLT | Trent Buhagiar (from (Italy) Brescia) |
| 19 | MF | (Azerbaijan) AZE | Sadiq Shafiyev (on loan from (Azerbaijan) Turan Tovuz) |
| 28 | MF | (Georgia (country)) GEO | Rati Ardazishvili (from (Georgia (country)) Samtredia) |
| 88 | FW | (Tajikistan) TJK | Shervoni Mabatshoev (from (Tajikistan) Istiklol) |

Out: Note: Flags indicate national team as defined under FIFA eligibility rules; some limited exceptions apply. Players may hold more than one non-FIFA nationality.

| No. | Pos. | Nation | Player |
|---|---|---|---|
| 11 | FW | (Azerbaijan) AZE | Orkhan Aliyev (to (Azerbaijan) Turan Tovuz) |
| 19 | FW | (Mali) MLI | Lassana N'Diaye (to (Qatar) Mesaimeer) |
| 20 | FW | (Azerbaijan) AZE | Mahir Hasanov (on loan to (Azerbaijan) Difai Ağsu) |
| 28 | FW | (Albania) ALB | Redon Mihana (to (Malta) Hamrun Spartans) |
| 77 | FW | (Brazil) BRA | João Braga |
| 88 | MF | (Brazil) BRA | Keverton (to (Brazil) Goiatuba) |

=== Neftçi ===
In: Note: Flags indicate national team as defined under FIFA eligibility rules; some limited exceptions apply. Players may hold more than one non-FIFA nationality.

| No. | Pos. | Nation | Player |
|---|---|---|---|
| 4 | MF | (Azerbaijan) AZE | Elvin Camalov (from (Azerbaijan) Sabah) |
| 9 | FW | (Germany) GER | Bassala Sambou (from (Cyprus) Enosis Neon Paralimni) |
| 11 | FW | (Brazil) BRA | Alex Fernandes (on loan from (Russia) Baltika Kaliningrad) |
| 18 | MF | (Japan) JPN | Ryonosuke Ohori (from (Estonia) TransINVEST) |

Out: Note: Flags indicate national team as defined under FIFA eligibility rules; some limited exceptions apply. Players may hold more than one non-FIFA nationality.

| No. | Pos. | Nation | Player |
|---|---|---|---|
| 4 | DF | (Hungary) HUN | Márk Tamás (to (Romania) Sepsi) |
| 9 | FW | (Brazil) BRA | Andre Shinyashiki |
| 11 | FW | (Collectivity of Saint Martin) SMN | Keelan Lebon (to (Greece) Athens Kallithea) |

=== Qarabağ ===
In: Note: Flags indicate national team as defined under FIFA eligibility rules; some limited exceptions apply. Players may hold more than one non-FIFA nationality.

| No. | Pos. | Nation | Player |
|---|---|---|---|
| 9 | MF | (Brazil) BRA | Kady Borges (from (Hungary) Ferencváros) |

Out: Note: Flags indicate national team as defined under FIFA eligibility rules; some limited exceptions apply. Players may hold more than one non-FIFA nationality.

| No. | Pos. | Nation | Player |
|---|---|---|---|
| 6 | MF | (Brazil) BRA | Júlio Romão (to (Hungary) Ferencváros) |
| 18 | FW | (Brazil) BRA | Juninho (to (Brazil) CR Flamengo) |

=== Sabah ===
In: Note: Flags indicate national team as defined under FIFA eligibility rules; some limited exceptions apply. Players may hold more than one non-FIFA nationality.

| No. | Pos. | Nation | Player |
|---|---|---|---|
| 33 | DF | (Uzbekistan) UZB | Umarali Rakhmonaliev (on loan from (Russia) Rubin Kazan) |
| 92 | GK | (Kazakhstan) KAZ | Stas Pokatilov (from (Kazakhstan) Tobol) |

Out: Note: Flags indicate national team as defined under FIFA eligibility rules; some limited exceptions apply. Players may hold more than one non-FIFA nationality.

| No. | Pos. | Nation | Player |
|---|---|---|---|
| 4 | MF | (Azerbaijan) AZE | Elvin Camalov (to (Azerbaijan) Neftçi) |

=== Sabail ===
In: Note: Flags indicate national team as defined under FIFA eligibility rules; some limited exceptions apply. Players may hold more than one non-FIFA nationality.

| No. | Pos. | Nation | Player |
|---|---|---|---|
| 4 | DF | (Serbia) SRB | Marko Nikolić (from (Kazakhstan) Turan) |
| 22 | FW | (Azerbaijan) AZE | Mirabdulla Abbasov (Free agent) |
| 96 | MF | (Azerbaijan) AZE | Ilkin Muradov (from (Azerbaijan) Shamakhi) |
| 99 | FW | (Rwanda) RWA | Innocent Nshuti (from (United States) One Knoxville) |

Out: Note: Flags indicate national team as defined under FIFA eligibility rules; some limited exceptions apply. Players may hold more than one non-FIFA nationality.

| No. | Pos. | Nation | Player |
|---|---|---|---|
| 15 | DF | (Azerbaijan) AZE | Vusal Masimov (to (Azerbaijan) Turan Tovuz) |
| 17 | MF | (Azerbaijan) AZE | Gülaga Asadov |

=== Shamakhi ===
In: Note: Flags indicate national team as defined under FIFA eligibility rules; some limited exceptions apply. Players may hold more than one non-FIFA nationality.

| No. | Pos. | Nation | Player |
|---|---|---|---|
| 3 | DF | (Ukraine) UKR | Vladyslav Veremeev (from (Latvia) Jelgava) |
| 12 | FW | (Brazil) BRA | Michael Thuíque (from (Lithuania) Hegelmann) |
| 14 | DF | (Azerbaijan) AZE | Vusal Masimov (from (Azerbaijan) Sabail) |
| 18 | DF | (Azerbaijan) AZE | Jalal Huseynov (on loan from (Bulgaria) Arda Kardzhali) |
| 23 | MF | (Azerbaijan) AZE | Murad Valiyev (from (Estonia) Levadia Tallinn) |
| 30 | MF | (Romania) ROU | Andrei Tîrcoveanu (from (Canada) Pacific) |
| 33 | MF | (Tanzania) TAN | Alphonce Msanga |

Out: Note: Flags indicate national team as defined under FIFA eligibility rules; some limited exceptions apply. Players may hold more than one non-FIFA nationality.

| No. | Pos. | Nation | Player |
|---|---|---|---|
| 4 | DF | (Azerbaijan) AZE | Adil Naghiyev |
| 7 | MF | (Georgia (country)) GEO | Giorgi Kantaria |
| 8 | MF | (Azerbaijan) AZE | Ilkin Muradov (to (Azerbaijan) Sabail) |
| 10 | MF | (Azerbaijan) AZE | Emin Zamanov |
| 11 | FW | (Belgium) BEL | Jonathan Benteke |
| 13 | MF | (Azerbaijan) AZE | Ramin Ahmedov (to (Kyrgyzstan) Alay) |
| 22 | FW | (Azerbaijan) AZE | Gurban Safarov |
| 80 | DF | (Azerbaijan) AZE | Zahid Mardanov |

=== Sumgayit ===
In: Note: Flags indicate national team as defined under FIFA eligibility rules; some limited exceptions apply. Players may hold more than one non-FIFA nationality.

| No. | Pos. | Nation | Player |
|---|---|---|---|
| 9 | FW | (Uzbekistan) UZB | Bobur Abdikholikov (from (Uzbekistan) Nasaf) |
| 11 | FW | (Guinea) GUI | Momo Yansané (from (Georgia (country)) Torpedo Kutaisi) |
| 23 | MF | (Dominican Republic) DOM | Ronaldo Vásquez (from (Bolivia) Deportivo Guabirá) |
| 57 | DF | (Azerbaijan) AZE | Nicat Faracli (from (Azerbaijan) Kür-Araz) |

Out: Note: Flags indicate national team as defined under FIFA eligibility rules; some limited exceptions apply. Players may hold more than one non-FIFA nationality.

| No. | Pos. | Nation | Player |
|---|---|---|---|
| 9 | FW | (Montenegro) MNE | Nikola Vujnović (to (Montenegro) Partizani Tirana) |
| 10 | MF | (Azerbaijan) AZE | Ragim Sadykhov (to (Azerbaijan) Turan Tovuz) |
| 11 | MF | (Brazil) BRA | Fernando Medeiros (to (Albania) Egnatia) |
| 18 | MF | (North Macedonia) MKD | Kristijan Velinovski (to (Bosnia and Herzegovina) GOŠK Gabela) |
| 23 | MF | (Ecuador) ECU | Jordan Rezabala |

=== Turan Tovuz ===
In: Note: Flags indicate national team as defined under FIFA eligibility rules; some limited exceptions apply. Players may hold more than one non-FIFA nationality.

| No. | Pos. | Nation | Player |
|---|---|---|---|
| 17 | MF | (Azerbaijan) AZE | Ragim Sadykhov (from (Azerbaijan) Sumgayit) |
| 19 | FW | (Azerbaijan) AZE | Orkhan Aliyev (from (Azerbaijan) Kapaz) |
| 29 | MF | (Russia) RUS | Anton Krachkovsky (on loan from (Russia) Dynamo Makhachkala) |
| 32 | DF | (Colombia) COL | Haiderson Hurtado (from (Czech Republic) Jablonec) |
| 40 | DF | (Brazil) BRA | Kauan (from (North Macedonia) Brera Strumica) |
| 90 | FW | (Brazil) BRA | Jô (from (Portugal) Chaves) |

Out: Note: Flags indicate national team as defined under FIFA eligibility rules; some limited exceptions apply. Players may hold more than one non-FIFA nationality.

| No. | Pos. | Nation | Player |
|---|---|---|---|
| 9 | FW | (Albania) ALB | Belajdi Pusi (to (Russia) Fakel Voronezh) |
| 80 | FW | (Nigeria) NGA | Otto John (to (Libya) Al-Madina) |
| 97 | MF | (Azerbaijan) AZE | Sadiq Shafiyev (on loan to (Azerbaijan) Kapaz) |

=== Zira ===
In: Note: Flags indicate national team as defined under FIFA eligibility rules; some limited exceptions apply. Players may hold more than one non-FIFA nationality.

| No. | Pos. | Nation | Player |

Out: Note: Flags indicate national team as defined under FIFA eligibility rules; some limited exceptions apply. Players may hold more than one non-FIFA nationality.

| No. | Pos. | Nation | Player |
|---|---|---|---|
| 22 | MF | (Azerbaijan) AZE | Ildar Alekperov (to (Kyrgyzstan) Alay) |
| 28 | MF | (Nigeria) NGA | Abbas Ibrahim (to (Albania) AF Elbasani) |
| — | FW | (Brazil) BRA | Filipe Pachtmann |
