= Rashad Sadiqov (footballer, born 1983) =

Azerbaijani footballer (born 1983)

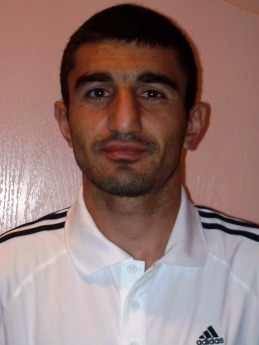

Personal information
- Full name: Rashad Abulfaz oglu Sadiqov
- Date of birth: 8 October 1983 (age 43)
- Place of birth: Nakhchivan, Azerbaijan SSR
- Height: 1.81 m (5 ft 11 in)
- Position: Midfielder

Team information
- Current team: Keşla
- Number: 6

Senior career*
Years	Team	Apps	(Gls)
1998–1999	Baki Fahlasi	1	(0)
2000–2002	Shafa Baku	23	(0)
2003–2008	Neftchi Baku	86	(2)
2004–2005	→ MOIK Baku (loan)	28	(1)
2009–2012	Qarabağ	94	(8)
2012–2014	Neftchi Baku	59	(8)
2014	Khazar Lankaran	15	(0)
2015–2017	Gabala	61	(1)
2017	Zira	0	(0)
2017–2018	Neftchi Baku	20	(1)
2019–	Keşla	6	(0)

International career^{‡}
2000–2002	Azerbaijan U18	2	(0)
2002–2004	Azerbaijan U19	2	(0)
2004–2006	Azerbaijan U21	13	(0)
2017	Azerbaijan U23	2	(0)
2006–2015	Azerbaijan	20	(1)
Medal record
Men's football
Representing Azerbaijan
Islamic Solidarity Games
Winner	2017 Azerbaijan
- * Club domestic league appearances and goals as of 19 June 2020 ‡ National team caps and goals as of 26 November 2019

Rashad Sadiqov (Azerbaijani: Rəşad Əbülfəz oğlu Sadiqov; born 8 October 1983) is an Azerbaijani footballer who plays as a central midfielder, for Keşla and the Azerbaijan national football team.

== Career ==
Sadiqov signed a two-year contract with Khazar Lankaran in August 2014. After only six-months with Khazar, Sadiqov terminated his contract, going on to sign a six-month contract with Gabala FK with the option of another year.

In May 2017, Sadiqov left Gabala, signing a one-year contract with Zira FK.

Sadiqov was dismissed by Zira on 24 July 2017 for disciplinary reasons, rejoining Neftchi Baku on 11 September 2017.

== Career statistics ==
=== Club ===
As of match played 16 December 2019

Appearances and goals by club, season and competition
Club	Season	League			National Cup		Continental		Other		Total	
Club	Season	Division	Apps	Goals	Apps	Goals	Apps	Goals	Apps	Goals	Apps	Goals
Baki Fahlasi	1998-99	APL	1	0			-		-		1	0
Shafa Baku	2000-01	APL	1	0			-		-		1	0
Shafa Baku	2001-02	APL	22	0			-		-		22	0
Shafa Baku	Total		23	0			-	-	-	-	23	0
Neftçi Baku	2003-04	APL	16	0			-		-		16	0
Neftçi Baku	2004-05	APL	0	0			4	0	-		4	0
Neftçi Baku	2005-06	APL	23	2			1	0	-		24	2
Neftçi Baku	2006-07	APL	24	0			-		-		24	0
Neftçi Baku	2007-08	APL	19	0			2	0	-		21	0
Neftçi Baku	2008-09	APL	4	0			5	2	-		9	2
Neftçi Baku	Total		86	2			12	2	-	-	98	4
MOIK Baku (loan)	2004-05	APL	28	1			-		-		28	1
Qarabağ	2008-09	APL	13	0			-		-		16	0
Qarabağ	2009-10	APL	25	2	2	0	6	0	-		33	2
Qarabağ	2010-11	APL	32	4	1	0	8	1	-		41	5
Qarabağ	2011-12	APL	24	2	5	0	5	2	-		34	4
Qarabağ	Total		94	8	8	0	19	3	-	-	121	11
Neftçi Baku	2012-13	APL	28	5	5	0	12	2	-		45	7
Neftçi Baku	2013-14	APL	31	3	5	0	2	0	-		38	3
Neftçi Baku	Total		59	8	10	0	14	2	-	-	83	10
Khazar Lankaran	2014-15	APL	15	0	0	0	-		-		15	0
Gabala	2014-15	APL	13	0	1	0	-		-		14	0
Gabala	2015-16	APL	27	1	3	1	12	0	-		42	2
Gabala	2016-17	APL	21	0	4	0	10	0	-		35	0
Gabala	Total		61	1	8	1	22	0	-	-	91	2
Zira	2017-18	APL	0	0	0	0	4	1	-		4	1
Neftchi Baku	2017-18	APL	20	1	4	0	-		-		24	1
Keşla	2019–20	APL	6	0	1	0	-		-		7	0
Career total			393	21	31	1	71	8	-	-	495	30

=== International ===
Azerbaijan
Year	Apps	Goals
2006	3	0
2007	0	0
2008	0	0
2009	0	0
2010	5	0
2011	4	0
2012	2	0
2013	3	0
2014	0	0
2015	3	0
Total	20	0

Statistics accurate as of match played 10 October 2015

== Honours ==
=== International ===
Azerbaijan U23

- Islamic Solidarity Games: (1) 2017
