= Azerbaijan national under-23 football team =

Azerbaijan Under-23
- Nickname: Milli (The National Team)
- Association: AFFA
- Confederation: UEFA (Europe)
- Head coach: Samir Aliyev
- Captain: Ruslan Abışov
- Home stadium: Tofiq Bahramov Stadium
- FIFA code: AZE
First colours	Second colours

The Azerbaijan national under-23 football team represents Azerbaijan in international football competitions and is controlled by the Association of Football Federations of Azerbaijan. The selection is limited to players under the age of 23, except during the Olympic Games where the use of three overage players is allowed.

== Honours ==
- Islamic Solidarity Games

Gold Medalists (1): 2017
Bronze Medalists (1): 2021

== Players ==
=== Current squad ===
The following 23 players were called up for the 2017 Islamic Solidarity Games in Azerbaijan. Ruslan Abışov, Rashad Sadiqov and Aghabala Ramazanov were the three over-aged players selected to play in the games.

Caps and goals as of May 21, 2017 after the match against Oman.

No.	Pos.	Player	Date of birth (age)	Caps	Goals	Club
1	GK	Shahrudin Mahammadaliyev	22 June 1994 (age 32)	5	0	(Association of Football Federations of Azerbaijan) Qarabağ
12	GK	Tarlan Ahmadli	21 November 1994 (age 31)	0	0	(Association of Football Federations of Azerbaijan) Turan Tovuz
22	GK	Emil Balayev	17 April 1994 (age 32)	0	0	(Association of Football Federations of Azerbaijan) Sabail
2	DF	Rahil Mammadov	24 November 1995 (age 30)	2	0	(Association of Football Federations of Azerbaijan) Qarabağ
3	DF	Azad Karimov	31 October 1994 (age 32)	0	0	(Association of Football Federations of Azerbaijan) Kapaz
4	DF	Adil Naghiyev	11 September 1995 (age 31)	3	0	(Association of Football Federations of Azerbaijan) Sumgayit
5	DF	Sadig Guliyev	9 March 1995 (age 31)	5	0	(Association of Football Federations of Azerbaijan) Zira
14	DF	Yusif Nabiyev	3 September 1997 (age 29)	0	0	(Association of Football Federations of Azerbaijan) Kapaz
15	DF	Ruslan Abışov	10 October 1987 (age 39)	5	1	(Association of Football Federations of Azerbaijan) Zira
18	DF	Tellur Mutallimov	8 April 1995 (age 31)	3	0	(Association of Football Federations of Azerbaijan) Zira
19	DF	Magsad Isayev	7 June 1994 (age 32)	5	1	(Association of Football Federations of Azerbaijan) Sabah
20	DF	Azer Salahli	11 April 1994 (age 32)	5	0	(Association of Football Federations of Azerbaijan) Neftchi
6	MF	Rashad Sadiqov*	8 October 1983 (age 43)	5	0	(Association of Football Federations of Azerbaijan) Neftchi Baku
7	MF	Joshgun Diniyev	13 September 1995 (age 31)	5	0	(Association of Football Federations of Azerbaijan) Sabah
8	MF	Elshan Abdullayev	5 February 1994 (age 32)	5	1	(Association of Football Federations of Azerbaijan) Sabah
10	MF	Orkhan Aliyev	21 December 1995 (age 30)	3	0	(Association of Football Federations of Azerbaijan) Sabail
13	MF	Elnur Jafarov	28 March 1997 (age 29)	0	0	(Association of Football Federations of Azerbaijan) Keşla
16	MF	Elvin Jamalov	4 February 1995 (age 31)	4	0	(Association of Football Federations of Azerbaijan) Zira
21	MF	Vugar Mustafayev	5 August 1994 (age 32)	4	0	(Association of Football Federations of Azerbaijan) Sumgayit
23	MF	Fahmin Muradbayli	16 March 1996 (age 30)	0	0	Unattached
9	FW	Aghabala Ramazanov	20 January 1993 (age 33)	5	1	(Association of Football Federations of Azerbaijan) Sabail
11	FW	Mahir Emreli	1 July 1997 (age 29)	5	2	(Croatian Football Federation) Dinamo Zagreb
17	FW	Mirabdulla Abbasov	27 April 1995 (age 31)	1	0	(Association of Football Federations of Azerbaijan) Neftchi Baku

== See also ==
- Azerbaijan national football team
- Azerbaijan national under-21 football team
- Azerbaijan national under-20 football team
- Azerbaijan national under-19 football team
- Azerbaijan national under-18 football team
- Azerbaijan national under-17 football team
- Association of Football Federations of Azerbaijan
- Azerbaijan Premier League
