= Ben Aziz Dao =

Burkinabé footballer

Personal information
- Date of birth: 8 July 1999 (age 27)
- Place of birth: Burkina Faso
- Height: 1.80 m (5 ft 11 in)
- Position: Defender

Team information
- Current team: Nouadhibou
- Number: 19

Youth career
- 2014–2016: Salitas

Senior career*
Years	Team	Apps	(Gls)
2016–2017	Santos		
2017–2019	Accra Lions		
2019–2020	AS Kaloum		
2021	AS Douanes	0	(0)
2021	Slutsk	0	(0)
2021	Smorgon	21	(0)
2022	AS Douanes		(0)
2022–2023	Turan Tovuz	9	(0)
2023–2024	Mosta	14	(1)
2024–	Nouadhibou		

International career
2019	Burkina Faso U20		
- * Club domestic league appearances and goals as of 13 May 2024

Ben Aziz Dao (born 8 July 1999) is a Burkinabé professional footballer who plays for Nouadhibou.

== International career ==
Dao represented Burkina Faso at 2019 African Games, where his team won the gold medals.
