= Bahruz Teymurov =

Azerbaijani footballer (born 1994)

Personal information
- Full name: Bahruz Elshan oglu Teymurov
- Date of birth: 1 January 1994 (age 32)
- Place of birth: Azerbaijan
- Height: 1.75 m (5 ft 9 in)
- Position: Winger

Team information
- Current team: Shamakhi
- Number: 88

Senior career*
Years	Team	Apps	(Gls)
2011–2013	Karvan	0	(0)
2014–2015	Khazar Lankaran	3	(0)
2015–2017	Shamkir		
2017–2018	MOIK Baku		
2018–2019	Qaradağ Lökbatan		
2019–2021	Zagatala		
2021–2022	Kapaz		
2022–	Shamakhi	1	(0)
- * Club domestic league appearances and goals as of 25 September 2022

Bahruz Teymurov (Azerbaijani: Bəhruz Teymurov; born on 1 January 1994) is an Azerbaijani professional footballer who plays as a winger for Shamakhi in the Azerbaijan Premier League.

== Club career ==
On 1 February 2015, Teymurov made his debut in the Azerbaijan Premier League for Khazar Lankaran match against Simurq.
