= Divine Naah =

Ghanaian footballer (born 1996)

Personal information
- Full name: Divine Yelsarmba Naah
- Date of birth: 20 April 1996 (age 30)
- Place of birth: Obuasi, Ghana
- Position: Midfielder

Team information
- Current team: Šiauliai
- Number: 24

Youth career
- 2007–2014: Right to Dream Academy

Senior career*
Years	Team	Apps	(Gls)
2014–2018	Manchester City	0	(0)
2014	→ Strømsgodset (loan)	1	(0)
2015–2016	→ NAC Breda (loan)	34	(2)
2016–2017	→ FC Nordsjælland (loan)	5	(0)
2017	→ Örebro SK (loan)	13	(0)
2018	→ A.F.C. Tubize (loan)	9	(0)
2018–2019	A.F.C. Tubize	24	(1)
2019–2020	Hapoel Ra'anana	19	(0)
2021	Mosta	6	(3)
2021–2022	Kauno Žalgiris	49	(7)
2023	Turan Tovuz	6	(0)
2023–2026	Kauno Žalgiris	66	(0)
2026–	Šiauliai	22	(2)
- * Club domestic league appearances and goals as of 10 August 2026

Divine Yelsarmba Naah (born 20 April 1996) is a Ghanaian footballer who currently plays as an attacking midfielder for TOPLYGA club Šiauliai.

== Career ==
Naah signed for Manchester City in July 2014, and was immediately loaned out for 6 months to Strømsgodset. He made his debut for Strømsgodset on 20 September 2014 in the 4–0 win against Bodø/Glimt, when he came on as a substitute in the 87th minute.

He signed for NAC Breda on an 18-month loan on 1 February 2015. He scored his first goal for the club on 25 May 2015, dribbling past 2 defenders before placing the ball in the net. This was a crucial goal in the Jupiler Play Offs in order to avoid relegation from the Dutch first league Eredivisie.

Naah subsequently spent loan periods at FC Nordsjælland, Örebro SK and Tubize, joining the latter club permanently after his Manchester City contract ended.

On 27 June 2019, Naah signed to the Israeli Premier League club Hapoel Ra'anana. In 2021 he first played for Mosta, then Kauno Žalgiris. He scored his first goal for Kauno in July 2021 against Europa in the UEFA Europa Conference League qualifying.

== Career statistics ==
As of 27 May 2015

Season	Club	Division	League		Cup		Other		Total	
Season	Club	Division	Apps	Goals	Apps	Goals	Apps	Goals	Apps	Goals
2014	Strømsgodset	Tippeligaen	1	0	0	0	0	0	1	0
2014/15	NAC Breda	Eredivisie	9	0	0	0	2	1	11	1
Career Total			10	0	0	0	2	1	12	1
