= Henry Okebugwu =

Nigerian footballer

Personal information
- Full name: Henry Chimuchem Okebugwu
- Date of birth: 19 June 1998 (age 28)
- Place of birth: Umuahia, Nigeria
- Height: 1.84 m (6 ft 1/2 in)
- Position: Midfielder

Team information
- Current team: Milsami Orhei
- Number: 18

Youth career
- –2017: Ifeanyi Ubah

Senior career*
Years	Team	Apps	(Gls)
2017–2018	Egnatia	21	(1)
2018–2019	Partizani Tirana	0	(0)
2018–2019	→ Kastrioti (loan)	26	(2)
2019-2022	Kastrioti	90	(5)
2022-2023	Turan Tovuz	17	(1)
2023	Iliria		
2024-	Milsami Orhei	8	(1)

International career
2014	Nigeria U17		
- * Club domestic league appearances and goals as of 15 June 2024

Henry Chimuchem Okebugwu (born 19 June 1998) is a Nigerian footballer who currently plays as a midfielder for Milsami Orhei in Moldovan Super Liga.

== Career statistics ==
=== Club ===
As of 22 July 2018.

Club	Season	League			Cup		Continental		Other		Total	
Club	Season	Division	Apps	Goals	Apps	Goals	Apps	Goals	Apps	Goals	Apps	Goals
FK Egnatia	2017–18	Albanian First Division	21	1	0	0	–		0	0	21	1
Partizani Tirana (loan)	2018–19	Albanian Superliga	0	0	0	0	–		0	0	0	0
Career total			21	1	0	0	0	0	0	0	21	1
