= Tarlan Ahmadli =

Azerbaijani footballer (born 1994)

Personal information
- Full name: Tarlan Seymur oglu Ahmadli
- Date of birth: 21 November 1994 (age 31)
- Place of birth: Baku, Azerbaijan
- Height: 1.73 m (5 ft 8 in)
- Position: Goalkeeper

Team information
- Current team: Araz-Naxçıvan
- Number: 94

Youth career
- 2011–2012: Ravan Baku

Senior career*
Years	Team	Apps	(Gls)
2013–2017	Sumgayit	11	(0)
2017–2018	Khazar Baku	14	(0)
2018–2019	Sabah	0	(0)
2019–2021	Gabala	14	(0)
2021–2022	Sumgayit	7	(0)
2022–2024	Turan-Tovuz	29	(0)
2024–	Araz-Naxçıvan	14	(0)

International career^{‡}
2015	Azerbaijan U21	2	(0)
Medal record
Men's football
Representing Azerbaijan
Islamic Solidarity Games
Winner	2017 Azerbaijan
- * Club domestic league appearances and goals as of 22 June 2026 ‡ National team caps and goals as of 22 September 2020

Tarlan Ahmadli (Azerbaijani: Tərlan Seymur oğlu Əhmədli; born on 21 November 1994) is an Azerbaijani professional footballer who plays as a goalkeeper for Araz-Naxçıvan in the Azerbaijan Premier League.

== Club career ==
On 20 December 2013, Ahmadli made his debut in the Azerbaijan Premier League for Sumgayit match against Khazar Lankaran.

== Career statistics ==
=== Club ===
As of match played 25 May 2025

Appearances and goals by club, season and competition
Club	Season	League			National Cup		Continental		Total	
Club	Season	Division	Apps	Goals	Apps	Goals	Apps	Goals	Apps	Goals
Sumgayit	2012–13	Azerbaijan Premier League	0	0	0	0	—		0	0
Sumgayit	2013–14	Azerbaijan Premier League	2	0	0	0	—		2	0
Sumgayit	2014–15	Azerbaijan Premier League	0	0	0	0	—		0	0
Sumgayit	2015–16	Azerbaijan Premier League	9	0	2	0	—		11	0
Sumgayit	2016–17	Azerbaijan Premier League	0	0	2	0	—		2	0
Sumgayit	Total		11	0	4	0	—		15	0
Khazar Baku	2017–18	Azerbaijan First Division	14	0	1	0	—		15	0
Sabah	2018–19	Azerbaijan Premier League	0	0	1	0	—		1	0
Gabala	2019–20	Azerbaijan Premier League	7	0	0	0	—		7	0
Gabala	2020–21	Azerbaijan Premier League	7	0	2	0	—		9	0
Gabala	Total		14	0	2	0	—		16	0
Sumgayit	2021–22	Azerbaijan Premier League	7	0	0	0	—		7	0
Turan Tovuz	2022–23	Azerbaijan Premier League	26	0	3	0	—		29	0
Turan Tovuz	2023–24	Azerbaijan Premier League	3	0	0	0	—		3	0
Turan Tovuz	Total		29	0	3	0	—		32	0
Araz-Naxçıvan	2024–25	Azerbaijan Premier League	2	0	2	0	—		4	0
Araz-Naxçıvan	2025–26	Azerbaijan Premier League	0	0	0	0	0	0	0	0
Araz-Naxçıvan	Total		2	0	2	0	0	0	4	0
Career total			77	0	13	0	0	0	90	0

== Honours ==
Khazar Baku

- Azerbaijan First Division (1): 2017–18

=== International ===
Azerbaijan U23

- Islamic Solidarity Games: (1) 2017
