= Şakir Seyidov =

Azerbaijani footballer (born 2000)

Personal information
- Full name: Şakir Mirseyid oğlu Seyidov
- Date of birth: 31 December 2000 (age 25)
- Place of birth: Azerbaijan
- Height: 1.79 m (5 ft 10 in)
- Position: Midfielder

Team information
- Current team: Kapaz
- Number: 88

Senior career*
| Years | Team | Apps | (Gls) |
| 2018–2025 | Sabah | 53 | (2) |
| 2022 | → Daugavpils (loan) | 8 | (0) |
| 2022–2023 | → Turan Tovuz (loan) | 28 | (0) |
| 2023–2024 | → Kapaz (loan) | 28 | (1) |
| 2025– | Kapaz | 29 | (0) |

International career^{‡}
| 2016 | Azerbaijan U17 | 3 | (0) |
| 2018–2019 | Azerbaijan U19 | 5 | (0) |
| 2019–2022 | Azerbaijan U21 | 17 | (0) |
- * Club domestic league appearances and goals as of 22 June 2026 ‡ National team caps and goals as of 4 May 2023

Şakir Mirseyid oğlu Seyidov (born 31 December 2000) is an Azerbaijani footballer who plays as a midfielder for Kapaz in the Azerbaijan Premier League.

== Club career ==
On 24 November 2018, Seyidov made his debut in the Azerbaijan Premier League for Sabah match against Qarabağ.

On 29 June 2022, Seyidov joined Turan Tovuz on loan for the 2022–23 season.

On 25 August 2023, Seyidov joined Kapaz on loan for the 2023–24 season.

== Career statistics ==
=== Club ===
As of match played 22 September 2024

Appearances and goals by club, season and competition
| Club | Season | League | | | National Cup (Note: Includes Azerbaijan Cup, Latvian Cup) | | Continental | | Total | |
| Club | Season | Division | Apps | Goals | Apps | Goals | Apps | Goals | Apps | Goals |
|---|---|---|---|---|---|---|---|---|---|---|
| Sabah | 2018-19 | Azerbaijan Premier League | 8 | 0 | 3 | 0 | — | | 11 | 0 |
| Sabah | 2019-20 | Azerbaijan Premier League | 16 | 2 | 2 | 0 | — | | 18 | 2 |
| Sabah | 2020-21 | Azerbaijan Premier League | 14 | 0 | 0 | 0 | — | | 14 | 0 |
| Sabah | 2021-22 | Azerbaijan Premier League | 5 | 0 | 1 | 0 | — | | 6 | 0 |
| Sabah | 2023-24 | Azerbaijan Premier League | 0 | 0 | 0 | 0 | 0 | 0 | 0 | 0 |
| Sabah | 2024-25 | Azerbaijan Premier League | 5 | 0 | 0 | 0 | 1 (Note: Appearance(s) in UEFA Europa Conference League) | 0 | 6 | 0 |
| Sabah | Total | | 48 | 2 | 6 | 0 | 1 | 0 | 55 | 2 |
| Daugavpils (loan) | 2022 | Virslīga | 8 | 0 | 0 | 0 | — | | 8 | 0 |
| Turan Tovuz (loan) | 2022-23 | Azerbaijan Premier League | 28 | 0 | 4 | 0 | — | | 32 | 0 |
| Kapaz (loan) | 2023-24 | Azerbaijan Premier League | 28 | 1 | 2 | 0 | — | | 30 | 1 |
| Career total | | | 112 | 3 | 12 | 0 | 1 | 0 | 125 | 3 |
