= Siyanda Xulu =

South African soccer player

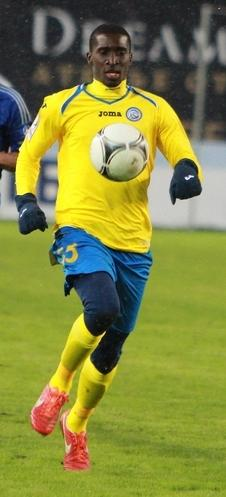
- Xulu with FC Rostov in 2013

Personal information
- Full name: Siyanda Xulu
- Date of birth: 30 December 1991 (age 34)
- Place of birth: Durban, South Africa
- Height: 1.89 m (6 ft 2 in)
- Position: Centre-back

Team information
- Current team: SuperSport United
- Number: 5

Youth career
- –2008: Royal Coastal
- 2008–2009: Kaizer Chiefs
- 2009: Mamelodi Sundowns

Senior career*
Years	Team	Apps	(Gls)
2009–2012	Mamelodi Sundowns	72	(4)
2012–2015	Rostov	30	(0)
2015–2017	Kaizer Chiefs	6	(0)
2017–2020	Maritzburg United	70	(3)
2020–2022	Hapoel Tel Aviv	49	(0)
2022–2023	Turan Tovuz	25	(1)
2023–	SuperSport United	8	(0)

International career^{‡}
2012–	South Africa	31	(1)
- * Club domestic league appearances and goals as of 16 November 2023 ‡ National team caps and goals as of 1 April 2024

Siyanda Xulu (born 30 December 1991) is a South African professional soccer player who plays as a centre-back for SuperSport United and the South Africa national team.

== Club career ==
Xulu was born in Durban. During his formative years, he spent time in the Kaizer Chiefs academy before being released in 2009 whereafter he joined Mamelodi Sundowns.

In May 2010 Xulu was offered a trial by Barcelona, before having a two-week trial with Arsenal in September 2010, which he also failed to do enough to win a contract.

In September 2012 Xulu joined Russian Premier League side FC Rostov, signing a four-year contract. At Rostov, Zulu won the Russian Cup of the 2013–14 footballing season.

He was released by Maritzburg United at the end of the 2019–20 season.

On 29 July 2020, Xulu signed for Israeli Premier League club Hapoel Tel Aviv.

On 30 June 2023, Turan Tovuz announced the departure of Xulu after his contract had expired.

On 28 July 2023, SuperSport United announced the signing of Xulu to a two-year contract.

== International career ==
Xulu made his debut for the South Africa national team on 15 June 2012 in the match against Gabon, he substituted Morgan Gould at the 80th minute. On 28 May 2018, he was named captain for the nation's 2018 COSAFA Cup campaign.

== Career statistics ==
As of match played 22 May 2023

=== Club ===
Appearances and goals by club, season and competition
Club	Season	League			Cup		Continental		Other		Total	
Club	Season	Division	Apps	Goals	Apps	Goals	Apps	Goals	Apps	Goals	Apps	Goals
Mamelodi Sundowns	2009–10	Premier Division	21	3			–				21	3
Mamelodi Sundowns	2010–11	Premier Division	25	1			–				25	1
Mamelodi Sundowns	2011–12	Premier Division	26	0	3	0	–		4 (Note: Three appearances in the MTN 8 Cup and one appearance in the Telkom Knockout.)	0	31	0
Mamelodi Sundowns	2012–13	Premier Division	0	0	0	0	–		2 (Note: One appearance in the Telkom Knockout.)	0	1	0
Mamelodi Sundowns	Total		72	4	3	0	–		5	0	80	4
Rostov	2012–13	Russian Premier League	11	0	1	0	–		1	0	13	0
Rostov	2013–14	Russian Premier League	15	0	1	0	–		–		16	0
Rostov	2014–15	Russian Premier League	4	0	1	0	0 (Note: Appearances in UEFA Europa League)	0	0	0	5	0
Rostov	Total		30	0	3	0	–		1	0	34	0
Kaizer Chiefs	2015–16	Premier Division	5	0	0	0	0 (Note: Appearances in CAF Champions League)	0	4 (Note: Four appearances in the MTN 8 Cup.)	0	9	0
Kaizer Chiefs	2016–17	Premier Division	1	0	0	0	–		0	0	1	0
Kaizer Chiefs	Total		6	0	0	0	–		4	0	10	0
Maritzburg United	2017–18	Premier Division	29	2	5	1	–		4 (Note: Three appearances in the MTN 8 Cup and one appearance in the Telkom Knockout.)	0	38	3
Maritzburg United	2018–19	Premier Division	29	0	1	0	–		3 (Note: One appearances in the MTN 8 Cup and two appearances in the Telkom Knockout.)	0	33	0
Maritzburg United	2019–20	Premier Division	12	1	2	0	–		2 (Note: Two appearances in the Telkom Knockout.)	0	16	1
Maritzburg United	Total		70	3	8	1	–		9	0	87	4
Hapoel Tel Aviv	2020–21	Israeli Premier League	31	0	3	1	–		1 (Note: Appearances in the Toto Cup)	0	35	1
Hapoel Tel Aviv	2021–22	Israeli Premier League	18	0	1	0	–		5	0	24	0
Hapoel Tel Aviv	Total		49	0	4	1	–		6	0	59	1
Turan Tovuz	2022–23	Azerbaijan Premier League	25	1	2	0	–				27	1
Career total			252	8	20	2	0	0	25	0	297	10

=== International ===
As of matches played on 10 February 2024

Appearances and goals by national team and year
National team	Year	Apps	Goals
South Africa	2012	1	0
South Africa	2013	2	0
South Africa	2014	1	0
South Africa	2018	3	1
South Africa	2021	7	0
South Africa	2022	4	0
South Africa	2023	9	0
South Africa	2024	4	0
Total		31	0

As of match played on 5 June 2018
Scores and results list South Africa's goal tally first, score column indicates score after each Xulu goal.

List of international goals scored by Siyanda Xulu
No.	Date	Venue	Opponent	Score	Result	Competition
1	5 June 2018	Old Peter Mokaba Stadium, Polokwane, South Africa	Namibia	4–1	4–1	2018 COSAFA Cup

== Honours ==
Rostov

- Russian Cup: 2013–14

South Africa

- Africa Cup of Nations third place: 2023
