= Rooney Eva Wankewai =

Cameroon association football player

Personal information
- Full name: Rooney Eva Wankewai
- Date of birth: 25 December 1996 (age 29)
- Place of birth: Douala, Cameroon
- Height: 1.85 m (6 ft 1 in)
- Position: Striker

Team information
- Current team: Teuta Durrës
- Number: 19

Senior career*
Years	Team	Apps	(Gls)
2013–2015	APEJES Academy	43	(28)
2016–2017	Chania	21	(3)
2017–2018	Veria	1	(0)
2018	Asteras Tripolis	0	(0)
2018–2019	Trikala	6	(1)
2019	Aittitos Spata	8	(3)
2019–2021	MC Alger	5	(0)
2020	→ AS Aïn M'lila (loan)	3	(0)
2020–2022	Karaiskakis	29	(5)
2022	Apollon Pontus	18	(8)
2022–2023	Turan-Tovuz	32	(16)
2023–2024	CSKA 1948	5	(1)
2024	Meizhou Hakka	15	(2)
2024–2025	Mes Rafsanjan F.C.	10	(0)
2025–2026	Bylis Ballsh	2	(0)
2026–	Teuta Durrës	13	(0)

International career^{‡}
	Cameroon U17	6	(1)
- * Club domestic league appearances and goals as of 13 May 2026 ‡ National team caps and goals as of 21:22, 26 March 2018 (UTC)

Rooney Eva Wankewai (born 25 December 1996) is a Cameroon professional footballer who plays as a striker for Kategoria Superiore club Teuta Durrës.

== Career ==
Born in Douala, Cameroon. Rooney started his career in APEJES Academy in Cameroon. After a successful season with APEJAS, he got a call for Cameroon U17 team camp for African U17 Championship.

=== Asteras Tripoli ===
In August 2017, Rooney signed a 3-year deal with one of the top Greek side Asteras Tripolis.

=== Trikala ===
On 31 August 2018, he signed a contract with Trikala on a free transfer.

=== MC Alger ===
In July 2019, he signed a contract with MC Alger on a free transfer.

=== Turan Tovuz ===
On 14 July 2023, Turan Tovuz announced the departure of Eva Wankewai after his contract had expired.

=== Meizhou Hakka ===
On 18 January 2024, CSKA 1948 announced that Eva Wankewai would be transferring to Chinese Super League club Meizhou Hakka.
