= Ehtiram Şahverdiyev =

Azerbaijani footballer (born 1996)

Personal information
- Full name: Ehtiram Etibar oğlu Şahverdiyev
- Date of birth: 1 October 1996 (age 30)
- Place of birth: Baku, Azerbaijan
- Height: 1.76 m (5 ft 9 in)
- Position: Winger

Team information
- Current team: Kapaz
- Number: 7

Senior career*
Years	Team	Apps	(Gls)
2016–2017	Gabala	1	(0)
2017–2019	Sumgayit	43	(1)
2020–2022	Gabala	34	(1)
2022–2023	Turan Tovuz	26	(1)
2023–	Kapaz	96	(3)

International career^{‡}
2016–2018	Azerbaijan U21	7	(0)
- * Club domestic league appearances and goals as of 22 June 2026 ‡ National team caps and goals as of 22 September 2020

Ehtiram Etibar oğlu Şahverdiyev (born on 1 October 1996) is an Azerbaijani professional footballer who plays as a winger for Kapaz.

== Career ==
=== Club ===
On 23 April 2016, Şahverdiyev made his debut in the Azerbaijan Premier League for Gabala match against Khazar Lankaran.

On 30 June 2022, Şahverdiyev signed a one-year contract with Turan Tovuz. On 7 July 2023, Şahverdiyev left Turan Tovuz after his contract was terminated by mutual agreement.
