= Abbas Aghazade =

Azerbaijani footballer (born 1999)

Personal information
- Full name: Abbas Elchin oğlu Ağazadə
- Date of birth: 10 February 1999 (age 27)
- Place of birth: Azerbaijan
- Height: 1.66 m (5 ft 5 in)
- Position: Midfielder

Team information
- Current team: Turan Tovuz
- Number: 21

Youth career
- –2019: Gabala

Senior career*
Years	Team	Apps	(Gls)
2019	MOIK Baku		
2019–2022	Sabah	3	(0)
2021–2022	→ Turan Tovuz (loan)	9	(0)
2022–	Turan Tovuz	11	(0)
- * Club domestic league appearances and goals as of 4 May 2023

Abbas Aghazade (Azerbaijani: Abbas Ağazadə; born 10 February 1999) is an Azerbaijani footballer who plays as a midfielder for Azerbaijani club Turan Tovuz.

== Career ==
On 9 July 2019, Aghazade signed a three-year contract with Sabah. He made his debut in the Azerbaijan Premier League on 19 August, starting in a 1–1 draw against Neftçi.
