= Sadiq Quliyev =

Azerbaijani footballer (born 1995)

Personal information
- Full name: Sadiq Qəfər oğlu Quliyev
- Date of birth: 9 March 1995 (age 31)
- Place of birth: Imishli, Azerbaijan
- Height: 1.85 m (6 ft 1 in)
- Position: Centre-back

Team information
- Current team: Sabail
- Number: 39

Youth career
- Gabala

Senior career*
Years	Team	Apps	(Gls)
2013–2016	Gabala	14	(0)
2015–2016	→ Zira (loan)	29	(0)
2017–2019	Zira	33	(0)
2019–2021	Gabala	10	(0)
2021–2022	Machhindra		
2022–2025	Turan Tovuz	26	(1)
2025–	Sabail	10	(0)

International career^{‡}
2011	Azerbaijan U17	2	(0)
2013	Azerbaijan U19	3	(0)
2015–2016	Azerbaijan U21	5	(0)
2017	Azerbaijan U23	5	(0)
Medal record
Men's football
Representing Azerbaijan
Islamic Solidarity Games
Winner	2017 Azerbaijan
- * Club domestic league appearances and goals as of 24 December 2025 ‡ National team caps and goals as of 22 September 2020

Sadiq Qəfər oğlu Quliyev (born on 9 March 1995) is an Azerbaijani footballer who plays as a defender for Sabail in the Azerbaijan First League.

== Club career ==
On 28 April 2013, Quliyev made his debut in the Azerbaijan Premier League for Gabala match against Qarabağ.

Quliyev was released by Gabala on 11 June 2021.

On 27 October 2021, Quliyev signed season long deal with Nepalese club Machhindra F.C.

== Honours ==
=== International ===
Azerbaijan U23

- Islamic Solidarity Games: 2017
