= Mirabdulla Abbasov =

Azerbaijani footballer (born 1995)

Personal information
- Full name: Mirabdulla Miryavər oğlu Abbasov
- Date of birth: 27 April 1995 (age 31)
- Place of birth: Baku, Azerbaijan
- Height: 1.81 m (5 ft 11 1/2 in)
- Position: Forward

Team information
- Current team: Abdysh-Ata
- Number: 9

Youth career
- 2005–2015: Neftchi Baku

Senior career*
| Years | Team | Apps | (Gls) |
| 2015–2022 | Neftchi Baku | 92 | (20) |
| 2016 | → Daugavpils (loan) | 7 | (0) |
| 2016–2017 | → Sumgayit (loan) | 27 | (8) |
| 2019 | → Sabail (loan) | 11 | (3) |
| 2022–2023 | Sabail | 31 | (3) |
| 2023–2024 | Iravan | | |
| 2025 | Sabail | 12 | (0) |
| 2025– | Abdysh-Ata | 1 | (0) |

International career^{‡}
| 2017 | Azerbaijan U23 | 1 | (0) |
| 2018– | Azerbaijan | 4 | (0) |
Medal record
Men's football
Representing Azerbaijan
Islamic Solidarity Games
| Winner | 2017 Azerbaijan |
- * Club domestic league appearances and goals as of 20 July 2025 ‡ National team caps and goals as of 4 May 2023

Mirabdulla Miryavər oğlu Abbasov (born 27 April 1995) is an Azerbaijani footballer who plays as a forward for Abdysh-Ata in the Kyrgyz Premier League. He was selected as the footballer of the year in Azerbaijan in 2018.

== Career ==
Mirabdulla Abbasov was born in 1995 in Baku, Azerbaijan. His older brother Mirsahib Abbasov is a football player as well. Mirabdulla played in the academy of Neftchi Baku and made his professional debut on 5 May 2015 in a game against Baku. In 2016, he was loaned out to the Latvian Higher League team Daugavpils and Azerbaijani Premier League team Sumgayit.

He became a regular player in the main team of Neftchi during the 2017–2018 season and earned 25 caps. At the end of the season, he extended his contract with Neftchi for another year until the end of 2018–2019 season.

On 25 June 2019, Abbasov had joined Sabail on a season-long loan deal.

== International ==
He made his debut for Azerbaijan national football team on 17 November 2018 in a 2018–19 UEFA Nations League D game against Faroe Islands.

== Career statistics ==
=== Club ===
As of match played 10 November 2018

Appearances and goals by club, season and competition
| Club | Season | League | | | National Cup | | Continental | | Other | | Total | |
| Club | Season | Division | Apps | Goals | Apps | Goals | Apps | Goals | Apps | Goals | Apps | Goals |
|---|---|---|---|---|---|---|---|---|---|---|---|---|
| Neftçi Baku | 2014–15 | Azerbaijan Premier League | 2 | 0 | 0 | 0 | - | | - | | 2 | 0 |
| Neftçi Baku | 2015–16 | Azerbaijan Premier League | 2 | 0 | 0 | 0 | 1 | 0 | - | | 3 | 0 |
| Neftçi Baku | 2016–17 | Azerbaijan Premier League | 0 | 0 | 0 | 0 | 0 | 0 | - | | 0 | 0 |
| Neftçi Baku | 2017–18 | Azerbaijan Premier League | 25 | 5 | 5 | 1 | - | | - | | 30 | 6 |
| Neftçi Baku | 2018–19 | Azerbaijan Premier League | 11 | 5 | 0 | 0 | 1 | 0 | - | | 12 | 5 |
| Neftçi Baku | Total | | 40 | 10 | 5 | 1 | 2 | 0 | - | - | 47 | 11 |
| Daugavpils (loan) | 2016 | Latvian Higher League | 7 | 0 | 3 | 0 | - | | - | | 10 | 0 |
| Sumgayit (loan) | 2016–17 | Azerbaijan Premier League | 27 | 8 | 3 | 0 | - | | - | | 30 | 8 |
| Career total | | | 74 | 18 | 11 | 1 | 2 | 0 | - | - | 87 | 19 |

== Honours ==
=== International ===
Azerbaijan U23

- Islamic Solidarity Games: (1) 2017

=== Individual ===
- Azerbaijani Footballer of the Year (1): 2018
