= Denis Marandici =

Moldovan footballer

Personal information
- Date of birth: 18 September 1996 (age 30)
- Place of birth: Chișinău, Moldova
- Height: 1.79 m (5 ft 10 in)
- Position: Left-back

Team information
- Current team: Turan Tovuz
- Number: 25

Youth career
- União de Leiria

Senior career*
Years	Team	Apps	(Gls)
2016–2020	União de Leiria	48	(0)
2020–2022	Celje	35	(0)
2022	Zrinjski Mostar	3	(0)
2023–	Turan Tovuz	62	(1)

International career^{‡}
2012	Moldova U17	1	(0)
2014	Moldova U19	2	(0)
2017–2018	Moldova U21	10	(0)
2020–	Moldova	15	(0)
- * Club domestic league appearances and goals as of 8 April 2025 ‡ National team caps and goals as of 17 November 2026

Denis Marandici (born 18 September 1996) is a Moldovan footballer who plays as a defender for Azerbaijan Premier League club Turan Tovuz and the Moldova national team.

== Career ==
Born in Moldova, Marandici grew up in Portugal.

On 4 February 2020, he signed a contract with Slovenian PrvaLiga club NK Celje.

== Honours ==
Celje

- Slovenian PrvaLiga: 2019–20
