= Khayal Najafov =

Azerbaijani footballer (born 1997)

Personal information
- Full name: Khayal Nazim oglu Najafov
- Date of birth: 19 December 1997 (age 28)
- Place of birth: Sumgayit, Azerbaijan
- Height: 1.67 m (5 ft 6 in)
- Position: Midfielder

Team information
- Current team: Turan Tovuz
- Number: 10

Youth career
- Sumgayit

Senior career*
Years	Team	Apps	(Gls)
2015–2021	Sumgayit	103	(2)
2021–2024	Neftçi Baku	17	(0)
2022–2024	→ Turan Tovuz (loan)	61	(2)
2024–	Turan Tovuz	44	(2)

International career^{‡}
2017	Azerbaijan U17	2	(0)
2017	Azerbaijan U21	2	(0)
2020–	Azerbaijan	2	(0)
- * Club domestic league appearances and goals as of 22 June 2026 ‡ National team caps and goals as of 17 November 2020

Khayal Nazim oglu Najafov (Azerbaijani: Xəyal Nazim oğlu Nəcəfov; born 19 December 1997) is an Azerbaijani professional footballer who plays as a midfielder for Turan Tovuz in the Azerbaijan Premier League.

== Career ==
=== Club ===
On 22 May 2015, Najafov made his debut in the Azerbaijan Premier League for Sumgayit match against Khazar Lankaran.

=== National team ===
He made his debut for Azerbaijan national football team on 14 November 2020 in a Nations League game against Montenegro. He substituted Tellur Mutallimov in the 81st minute.
