= Adil Naghiyev =

Azerbaijani footballer (born 1995)

Personal information
- Full name: Adil Akif oglu Naghiyev
- Date of birth: 11 September 1995 (age 31)
- Place of birth: Baku, Azerbaijan
- Height: 1.89 m (6 ft 2 in)
- Position: Defender

Youth career
- Shamakhi

Senior career*
Years	Team	Apps	(Gls)
2013–2015	AZAL	0	(0)
2015	→ Zira (loan)	0	(0)
2015–2019	Zira	84	(3)
2019	Sumgayit	12	(0)
2019–2024	Sabail	98	(2)
2022	→ Shamakhi (loan)	17	(0)
2024	Shamakhi	13	(0)

International career^{‡}
2011–2012	Azerbaijan U17	2	(0)
2013–2014	Azerbaijan U19	3	(0)
2015–2016	Azerbaijan U21	7	(0)
2017	Azerbaijan U23	3	(0)
2020	Azerbaijan	1	(0)
Medal record
Men's football
Representing Azerbaijan
Islamic Solidarity Games
Winner	2017 Azerbaijan
- * Club domestic league appearances and goals as of 26 December 2024 ‡ National team caps and goals as of 26 December 2024

Adil Akif oglu Naghiyev (Azerbaijani: Adil Akif oğlu Nağıyev; born 11 September 1995) is an Azerbaijani footballer who plays as a defender.

== Career ==
On 27 December 2018, Naghiyev signed for Sumgayit FK.

On 9 August 2019, Naghiyev signed for Sabail FK on a one-year contract.

On June 15, 2024, Shamakhi signed a one-year contract with Naghiyev. On December 10, 2024, the club announced the termination of his contract.

=== International ===
On 26 May 2016, Naghiyev made his senior international debut for Azerbaijan in a friendly match against Andorra.

== Career statistics ==
=== Club ===
As of match played 19 December 2018

Appearances and goals by club, season and competition
Club	Season	League			National Cup		Continental		Other		Total	
Club	Season	Division	Apps	Goals	Apps	Goals	Apps	Goals	Apps	Goals	Apps	Goals
AZAL	2013–14	Azerbaijan Premier League	0	0	0	0	-		-		0	0
AZAL	2014–15	Azerbaijan Premier League	0	0	0	0	-		-		0	0
AZAL	Total		0	0	0	0	-	-	-	-	0	0
Zira (loan)	2014–15	Azerbaijan First Division	12	3	0	0	-		-		12	3
Zira	2015–16	Azerbaijan Premier League	25	1	2	0	-		-		27	1
Zira	2016–17	Azerbaijan Premier League	22	1	2	0	-		-		24	1
Zira	2017–18	Azerbaijan Premier League	24	1	2	0	2	0	-		28	1
Zira	2018–19	Azerbaijan Premier League	13	0	1	2	-		-		14	2
Zira	Total		84	3	7	2	2	0	-	-	93	5
Sumgayit	2018–19	Azerbaijan Premier League	12	0	3	0	-		-		15	0
Sabail	2019–20	Azerbaijan Premier League	0	0	0	0	0	0	-		0	0
Career total			108	6	10	2	2	0	-	-	120	8

=== International ===
Azerbaijan
Year	Apps	Goals
2016	1	0
Total	1	0

Statistics accurate as of match played 26 May 2016

== Honours ==
=== International ===
Azerbaijan U23

- Islamic Solidarity Games: (1) 2017
