= Vüqar Mustafayev =

Azerbaijani footballer (born 1994)

Personal information
- Full name: Vüqar Gündüz oğlu Mustafayev
- Date of birth: 5 August 1994 (age 32)
- Place of birth: Zaqatala, Azerbaijan
- Height: 1.77 m (5 ft 10 in)
- Position: Midfielder

Senior career*
Years	Team	Apps	(Gls)
2013–2014	Baku	16	(0)
2014–2015	Simurq	13	(0)
2015–2017	Qarabağ	8	(1)
2016–2017	→ Zira (loan)	39	(1)
2017–2019	Zira	40	(0)
2019–2025	Sumgayit	139	(0)

International career
2015–2016	Azerbaijan U21	6	(0)
2017	Azerbaijan U23	4	(0)
2016	Azerbaijan	11	(0)
Medal record
Men's football
Representing Azerbaijan
Islamic Solidarity Games
Winner	2017 Azerbaijan
- * Club domestic league appearances and goals

Vüqar Gündüz oğlu Mustafayev (born on 5 August 1994) is an Azerbaijani former professional footballer who played as a midfielder.

== Career ==
=== Club ===
On 3 June 2019, Mustafayev signed a one-year contract with Sumgayit FK.

=== International ===
On 26 May 2016 Mustafayev made his senior international debut for Azerbaijan in a friendly match against Andorra.

== Career statistics ==
=== Club ===
As of match played 20 May 2018

Appearances and goals by club, season and competition
Club	Season	League			National Cup		Continental		Other		Total	
Club	Season	Division	Apps	Goals	Apps	Goals	Apps	Goals	Apps	Goals	Apps	Goals
Baku	2013–14	Azerbaijan Premier League	16	0	3	0	–		–		19	0
Simurq	2014–15	Azerbaijan Premier League	12	0	4	0	–		–		16	0
Qarabağ	2015–16	Azerbaijan Premier League	8	1	0	0	1	0	–		9	1
Qarabağ	2016–17	Azerbaijan Premier League	0	0	0	0	0	0	–		0	0
Qarabağ	Total		8	1	0	0	1	0	-	-	9	1
Zira (loan)	2015–16	Azerbaijan Premier League	14	0	2	0	–		–		16	0
Zira (loan)	2016–17	Azerbaijan Premier League	25	1	3	0	–		–		28	1
Zira	2017–18	Azerbaijan Premier League	26	0	3	0	3	0	–		32	0
Zira	2018–19	Azerbaijan Premier League	14	0	1	0	–		–		15	0
Zira	Total		40	0	1	0	-	-	-	-	47	0
Career total			115	2	16	0	4	0	-	-	135	2

=== International ===
Appearances and goals by national team and year
National team	Year	Apps	Goals
Azerbaijan	2016	1	0
Azerbaijan	2017	–	
Azerbaijan	2018	–	
Azerbaijan	2019	–	
Azerbaijan	2020	4	0
Azerbaijan	2021	6	0
Total		11	0

== Honours ==
=== International ===
Azerbaijan U23

- Islamic Solidarity Games: (1) 2017
