= Franco Mazurek =

Argentine footballer

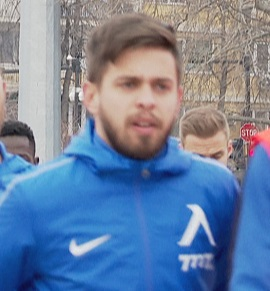
- Mazurek with Levski Sofia in 2020

Personal information
- Full name: Franco Eduardo Mazurek
- Date of birth: 24 September 1993 (age 33)
- Place of birth: Puerto Rico, Argentina
- Height: 1.66 m (5 ft 5 in)
- Position: Attacking midfielder

Team information
- Current team: Deportes Copiapó
- Number: 10

Youth career
- Boca Juniors

Senior career*
Years	Team	Apps	(Gls)
2013–2014	Boca Juniors	0	(0)
2013	→ Crucero del Norte (loan)	11	(2)
2014	Olmedo	25	(2)
2015	All Boys	34	(1)
2016–2017	Colón	8	(1)
2016–2017	→ Palestino (loan)	26	(1)
2017–2019	Panetolikos	53	(10)
2019–2020	Levski Sofia	25	(1)
2020–2021	Panetolikos	24	(1)
2021–2022	AEL Limassol	12	(3)
2022	Ethnikos Achna	21	(1)
2022–2023	Sabail	32	(6)
2023–2024	Ironi Tiberias	43	(7)
2025–	Deportes Copiapó	21	(0)
- * Club domestic league appearances and goals as of 1 November 2025

Franco Eduardo Mazurek (born 24 September 1993) is an Argentine professional footballer who plays as a midfielder for Chilean club Deportes Copiapó.

== Career ==
=== Panetolikos ===
On 6 July 2017, Panetolikos officially announced the signing of Franco Eduardo Mazurek, who was previously a member of Palestino, until the summer of 2019. The 24-year-old Argentine attacking midfielder has also been a member of Boca Juniors in the beginning of his career, while he is a close friend of Panaitolikos' defensive midfielder Federico Bravo. On 23 September 2017 he scored his first goal for the club in a 2–0 home win against Panathinaikos. On 4 November 2017 he scored his team's goal in a 3–1 home loss against Xanthi. On 26 November 2017 Franco scored in a 3–1 home win against AEL, which was the first since matchday 6. Four days later he scored in a triumphic 5–0 away win against Ergotelis for the group stages of the Greek Cup.

He scored in the 2018–19 season's opener, a 2–1 home loss against Atromitos. On 24 September 2018, he scored with a stunning volley in a 2–2 home draw against Lamia. On 20 October 2018, he was the MVP of a 2–0 away win against PAS Giannina, scoring both goals.

On 11 February 2019, he scored opened the score in an eventual 2–2 home draw against AEL. On 11 March 2019, he was the MVP of an emphatic 5–0 home win against Panionios, scoring a brace and giving one assist.

The 26-year old, who has impressed with his performances during the season, having recorded 7 goals and 4 assists in 27 games, is out of contract next summer and has attracted interest from Panathinaikos and Atromitos.

=== Levski Sofia ===
On 20 June 2019 Mazurek signed a 2-year contract with Bulgarian side Levski Sofia, making him the first Argentinian to ever play for the club.

=== Return to Panetolikos ===
On 12 August 2020, Panetolikos officially announced the return of the Argentine, who signed a contract until the summer of 2021.

=== Deportes Copiapó ===
In 2025, Mazurek returned to South America and signed with Chilean club Deportes Copiapó.

== Personal life ==
Born in Argentina, Mazurek is of Polish descent.
