= Eltun Turabov =

Azerbaijani footballer (born 1997)

Personal information
- Full name: Eltun Kamal oğlu Turabov
- Date of birth: 18 February 1997 (age 29)
- Place of birth: Baku, Azerbaijan
- Height: 1.84 m (6 ft 0 in)
- Position: Defensive midfielder

Team information
- Current team: Karvan
- Number: 33

Youth career
- Qarabağ

Senior career*
| Years | Team | Apps | (Gls) |
| 2017–2018 | Qarabağ | 1 | (0) |
| 2018 | → Khazar Baku (loan) | 10 | (0) |
| 2018–2022 | Sabah | 21 | (0) |
| 2019–2020 | → Bylis (loan) | 8 | (0) |
| 2020–2022 | → Sumgayit (loan) | 23 | (0) |
| 2022–2025 | Turan Tovuz | 30 | (0) |
| 2025– | Karvan | 21 | (1) |

International career
| 2015 | Azerbaijan U19 | 2 | (0) |
| 2017–2018 | Azerbaijan U21 | 6 | (0) |
- * Club domestic league appearances and goals as of 22 June 2026

Eltun Kamal oğlu Turabov (born on 18 February 1997) is an Azerbaijani professional footballer who plays as a midfielder for Karvan in the Azerbaijan Premier League.

== Career ==
=== Club ===
On 26 July 2019, Sabah was announced that Turabov had joined Albanian club Bylis on a season-long loan deal. He made his professional debut for Bylis in the Albanian Superliga on 24 August 2019, starting in the away match against Teuta.

On 20 August 2020, Turabov joined Sumgayit FK on a season-long loan deal.
