= Giorgi Kantaria =

Georgian footballer

Personal information
- Date of birth: 27 April 1997 (age 29)
- Place of birth: Zugdidi, Georgia
- Height: 1.84 m (6 ft 0 in)
- Position: Defensive midfielder

Team information
- Current team: Al-Naft

Youth career
- 2013–2015: Dinamo Tbilisi

Senior career*
Years	Team	Apps	(Gls)
2015–2016	Zugdidi	24	(0)
2017–2021	Neman Grodno	109	(2)
2022	Telavi	13	(0)
2022–2023	Kapaz	31	(0)
2023	Telavi	15	(0)
2024	Nejmeh	12	(0)
2024	Shamakhi	14	(2)
2025	Sokol Saratov	11	(0)
2025–2026	Neftekhimik Nizhnekamsk	29	(0)
2026–	Al-Naft	0	(0)

International career^{‡}
2018	Georgia U21	4	(0)
- * Club domestic league appearances and goals as of 16 May 2026 ‡ National team caps and goals as of 16 October 2018

Giorgi Kantaria (Georgian: გიორგი ქანთარია; born on 27 April 1997) is a Georgian professional footballer who plays as a defensive midfielder for Iraqi club Al-Naft.

== Career ==
=== Club ===
He started playing football at the Zugdidi club school. His first coaches were Otar Dzalamidze and Mamuka Chachua. At the age of 14, he moved to the Dinamo Tbilisi academy. With the club's youth team, he finished second in the 2013/2014 season and became the national champion among youth in the 2014/2015 season.

In 2015, he returned to Zugdidi. He made his debut for the team on August 14 in an away match against Dinamo Batumi. Kantaria came on the field in the 41st minute, replacing Nika Narmania, and received a yellow card just a minute later.

At the beginning of 2017, he underwent a trial as a free agent at the Neman Grodno, and as a result, he signed a contract with the team on March 29. Due to a shortage of defenders caused by numerous injuries, Kantaria was able to secure a place in the club's starting lineup. On April 2, Giorgi started in the first round match against Slavia, thus making his debut in the Belarusian Premier League. In his first two seasons, he participated in 45 league matches. On March 29, 2019, in a game against Gomel, he scored his first goal in his professional career, finding the net in the 23rd minute, which helped his team secure a victory. However, he also scored an own goal at the end of the first half. After his contract ended in December 2021, he left the Neman Grodno.

In early 2022, he moved to the Erovnuli Liga club Telavi.

In July 2022, he transferred to the Azerbaijani club Kapaz.

On June 23, 2024, Shamakhi announced that they had signed a one-year contract with Kantaria. On December 10, 2024, the club announced the termination of his contract.

=== International ===
He participated in the qualifying matches for the 2019 UEFA European Under-21 Championship with the U21 national team of Georgia.

== Honours ==
Nejmeh

- Lebanese Premier League: 2023–24
