= Kamal Bayramov =

Azerbaijani footballer (born 1985)

Personal information
- Full name: Kemal Bayram oglu Bayramov
- Date of birth: 19 August 1985 (age 41)
- Place of birth: Tovuz, Azerbaijan
- Height: 1.78 m (5 ft 10 in)
- Position: Goalkeeper

Team information
- Current team: Turan Tovuz
- Number: 85

Youth career
- Neftçi Baku

Senior career*
Years	Team	Apps	(Gls)
2007–2009	Mughan	21	(0)
2009–2011	Turan-Tovuz	46	(0)
2011–2012	Khazar Lankaran	7	(0)
2013	Turan-Tovuz	9	(2)
2014	Ravan Baku	11	(0)
2014	Araz-Naxçıvan	10	(0)
2014–2015	Shuvalan	6	(0)
2015–2019	Zira	34	(0)
2019–2020	Sabail	11	(0)
2020–2022	Keşla	9	(0)
2022–	Turan Tovuz	14	(0)
- * Club domestic league appearances and goals as of 4 April 2024

Kamal Bayramov (Azerbaijani: Kəmal Bayram oğlu Bayramov) is an Azerbaijani professional footballer who plays as a goalkeeper for Turan Tovuz in the Azerbaijan Premier League.

== Club career ==
On 21 October 2009, Bayramov made his debut in the Azerbaijan Premier League for Ravan Baku match against Khazar Lankaran.

On 14 August 2020, Bayramov signed one-year contract with Keşla FK.
