= Football at the 2017 Islamic Solidarity Games =

Tournament details
- Host country: Azerbaijan
- Dates: 8 – 21 May
- Teams: 8 (from 3 confederations)
- Venues: 4 (in 1 host city)

Final positions
- Champions: Azerbaijan
- Runners-up: Oman
- Third place: Algeria
- Fourth place: Cameroon

Tournament statistics
- Matches played: 16
- Goals scored: 37 (2.31 per match)
- Top scorer: (Palestine) Oday Dabbagh (3 goals)

Football tournament at the 2017 Islamic Solidarity Games was held in Azerbaijan from 8 to 21 May 2017. Azerbaijan defeated Oman in the final to win the gold medal.

== Participating teams ==
Eight participated teams.

- Algeria
- Azerbaijan – Host
- Cameroon
- Morocco
- Oman
- Palestine
- Saudi Arabia
- Turkey

== Venues ==
| Baku | Football at the 2017 Islamic Solidarity Games is located in Azerbaijan | Baku |
|---|---|---|
| Tofiq Bahramov Stadium | Football at the 2017 Islamic Solidarity Games is located in Azerbaijan | Dalga Arena |
| Capacity: 31,200 | Football at the 2017 Islamic Solidarity Games is located in Azerbaijan | Capacity: 6,500 |
| Baku | Football at the 2017 Islamic Solidarity Games is located in Azerbaijan | Baku |
| Bayil Stadium | Football at the 2017 Islamic Solidarity Games is located in Azerbaijan | AZAL Arena |
| Capacity: 5,000 | Football at the 2017 Islamic Solidarity Games is located in Azerbaijan | Capacity: 3,500 |

== Group stage ==
=== Group A ===
| Pos | Team | Pld | W | D | L | GF | GA | GD | Pts | Qualification |
|---|---|---|---|---|---|---|---|---|---|---|
| 1 | Cameroon | 3 | 1 | 2 | 0 | 4 | 1 | +3 | 5 | Advance to knockout stage |
| 2 | Azerbaijan (H) | 3 | 1 | 2 | 0 | 2 | 0 | +2 | 5 | Advance to knockout stage |
| 3 | Morocco | 3 | 1 | 2 | 0 | 2 | 1 | +1 | 5 | |
| 4 | Saudi Arabia | 3 | 0 | 0 | 3 | 0 | 6 | −6 | 0 | |

Source: Islamic Solidarity Games
(H) Hosts
8 May 2017
10:30

| Saudi Arabia | 0–1 | Morocco |
|---|---|---|
| | Report | 76' El Maftoul |

AZAL Arena, Baku
Referee: Mykola Balakin (Ukraine)
8 May 2017
18:30

| Azerbaijan | 0–0 | Cameroon |
|---|---|---|
| | Report |

Bayil Stadium, Baku
Referee: Giorgi Kruashvili (Georgia)

11 May 2017
12:30

| Cameroon | 1–1 | Morocco |
|---|---|---|
| Pangop Tchidjui 30' | Report | 90+1' Goudali |

Bayil Stadium, Baku
Referee: Rahim Hasanov (Azerbaijan)
11 May 2017
18:30

| Azerbaijan | 2–0 | Saudi Arabia |
|---|---|---|
| Abdullayev 67'; Ramazanov 81' | Report |

Bayil Stadium, Baku
Referee: Andrei Ceban (Moldova)

15 May 2017
18:30

| Azerbaijan | 0–0 | Morocco |
|---|---|---|
| | Report |

Bayil Stadium, Baku
Referee: Giorgi Kruashvili (Georgia)
15 May 2017
18:30

| Cameroon | 3–0 | Saudi Arabia |
|---|---|---|
| Nkolo Ossingane 39'; Pangop Tchidjui 45+1' (pen.); Bagnack 59' | Report |

AZAL Arena, Baku
Referee: Aliyar Aghayev (Azerbaijan)

=== Group B ===
| Pos | Team | Pld | W | D | L | GF | GA | GD | Pts | Qualification |
|---|---|---|---|---|---|---|---|---|---|---|
| 1 | Algeria | 3 | 2 | 1 | 0 | 4 | 2 | +2 | 7 | Advance to knockout stage |
| 2 | Oman | 3 | 1 | 2 | 0 | 6 | 5 | +1 | 5 | Advance to knockout stage |
| 3 | Turkey | 3 | 1 | 0 | 2 | 7 | 8 | −1 | 3 | |
| 4 | Palestine | 3 | 0 | 1 | 2 | 5 | 7 | −2 | 1 | |

Source: Islamic Solidarity Games
8 May 2017
12:30

| Algeria | 2–1 | Turkey |
|---|---|---|
| El Melali 78'; Gagaâ 90+6' (pen.) | Report | 38' Eriş |

Bayil Stadium, Baku
Referee: Aliyar Aghayev (Azerbaijan)
8 May 2017
16:30

| Palestine | 2–2 | Oman |
|---|---|---|
| Dabbagh 5', 54' | Report | 48', 86' Awlad Wadi |

AZAL Arena, Baku
Referee: Andrei Ceban (Moldova)

11 May 2017
10:30

| Oman | 3–2 | Turkey |
|---|---|---|
| Al-Matroushi 58'; Al-Yahyaei 64'; Al-Ghassani 73' (pen.) | Report | 27' Okutan; 45+1' Kayar |

AZAL Arena, Baku
Referee: Giorgi Kruashvili (Georgia)
11 May 2017
16:30

| Palestine | 0–1 | Algeria |
|---|---|---|
| | Report | 63' (pen.) El Melali |

AZAL Arena, Baku
Referee: Mykola Balakin (Ukraine)

15 May 2017
12:30

| Oman | 1–1 | Algeria |
|---|---|---|
| Al-Ghassani 40' | Report | 45+1' Meziani |

AZAL Arena, Baku
Referee: Andrei Ceban (Moldova)
15 May 2017
12:30

| Turkey | 4–3 | Palestine |
|---|---|---|
| Aksu 44', 81'; Okutan 63'; Antalyali 71' | Report | 23' Dabbagh; 29' Maraaba; 33' Batran |

Bayil Stadium, Baku
Referee: Mykola Balakin (Ukraine)

== Knockout stage ==
Semifinals
18 May – Baku
Algeria | 0
Azerbaijan | 2
18 May – Baku
Cameroon | 0 (3)
Oman | 0 (4)

Final
21 May – Baku
Azerbaijan | 2
Oman | 1
Third place
21 May – Baku
Algeria | 2
Cameroon | 0

=== Semifinals ===
18 May 2017
12:30

| Algeria | 0–2 | Azerbaijan |
|---|---|---|
| | Report | 39' Abışov; 58' Isayev |

Dalga Arena, Baku
Referee: Mykola Balakin (Ukraine)

18 May 2017
18:30

| Cameroon | 0–0 (a.e.t.) | Oman |
|---|---|---|
| | Report |
Penalties
| Moundi (penalty missed); Andoulo (penalty scored); Mbaissidara Mbaizo (penalty missed); Kunde Malong (penalty scored); Pangop Tchidjui (penalty scored); Bagnack (penalty missed) | 3–4 | (penalty missed) Al-Yahyaei; (penalty scored) Al-Ghassani; (penalty scored) Al-Matroushi; (penalty scored) Al-Mamary; (penalty missed) Al-Kaabi; (penalty scored) Al Habsi |

Dalga Arena, Baku
Referee: Rahim Hasanov (Azerbaijan)

=== Bronze medal match ===
21 May 2017
14:00

| Algeria | 2–0 | Cameroon |
|---|---|---|
| Gagaâ 55' (pen.); Hamra 63' | Report |

Tofiq Bahramov Stadium, Baku
Referee: Aliyar Aghayev (Azerbaijan)

=== Gold medal match ===
21 May 2017
20:00

| Azerbaijan | 2–1 | Oman |
|---|---|---|
| Madatov 17', 27' | Report | 56' Al-Yahyaei |

Tofiq Bahramov Stadium, Baku
Referee: Giorgi Kruashvili (Georgia)

== Final ranking ==
| Pos | Team | Pld | W | D | L | GF | GA | GD | Pts | Final result |
|---|---|---|---|---|---|---|---|---|---|---|
| 1 | Azerbaijan (H) | 5 | 3 | 2 | 0 | 6 | 1 | +5 | 11 | Gold Medal |
| 2 | Oman | 5 | 1 | 3 | 1 | 7 | 7 | 0 | 6 | Silver Medal |
| 3 | Algeria | 5 | 3 | 1 | 1 | 6 | 4 | +2 | 10 | Bronze Medal |
| 4 | Cameroon | 5 | 1 | 3 | 1 | 4 | 3 | +1 | 6 | Fourth place |
| 5 | Morocco | 3 | 1 | 2 | 0 | 2 | 1 | +1 | 5 | Eliminated in group stage |
| 6 | Turkey | 3 | 1 | 0 | 2 | 7 | 8 | −1 | 3 | Eliminated in group stage |
| 7 | Palestine | 3 | 0 | 1 | 2 | 5 | 7 | −2 | 1 | Eliminated in group stage |
| 8 | Saudi Arabia | 3 | 0 | 0 | 3 | 0 | 6 | −6 | 0 | Eliminated in group stage |

(H) Hosts

== Goalscorers ==
3 goals

- (Palestine) Oday Dabbagh

2 goals

- (Algeria) Farid El Melali
- (Algeria) Ahmed Gagaâ
- (Azerbaijan) Mahir Madatov
- (Cameroon) Frantz Pangop Tchidjui
- (Oman) Muhsen Al-Ghassani
- (Oman) Salaah Al-Yahyaei
- (Oman) Marwan Awlad Wadi
- (Turkey) Hakkı Can Aksu
- (Turkey) Melih Okutan

1 goal

- (Algeria) Abderrahim Hamra
- (Algeria) Tayeb Meziani
- (Azerbaijan) Elshan Abdullayev
- (Azerbaijan) Ruslan Abışov
- (Azerbaijan) Magsad Isayev
- (Azerbaijan) Aghabala Ramazanov
- (Cameroon) Macky Bagnack
- (Cameroon) Denis Yvan Nkolo Ossingane
- (Morocco) Chouaib El Maftoul
- (Morocco) Hamza Goudali
- (Oman) Ahmed Al-Matroushi
- (Palestine) Islam Batran
- (Palestine) Mohammed Maraaba
- (Turkey) Taylan Antalyali
- (Turkey) Onur Eriş
- (Turkey) Oğuzhan Kayar
