= 2025–26 Araz-Naxçıvan PFK season =

Araz-Naxçıvan
2025–26 season
- President: Ramin Akhundov
- Manager: Elmar Bakhshiyev (Until 25 December); Andriy Demchenko (From 4 January)
- Stadium: City Stadium
- Premier League: 6th
- Azerbaijan Cup: Last 16
- Top goalscorer: League: Ba-Muaka Simakala (9); All: Ba-Muaka Simakala (9); Felipe Santos (9)

The Araz-Naxçıvan PFK 2025–26 season was Araz-Naxçıvan's third season back in the Azerbaijan Premier League since 2014–15.

== Season events ==
On 12 June, Araz announced the signing of Bar Cohen from Maccabi Netanya to a one-year contract.

On 17 June, Araz announced the signing of Ba-Muaka Simakala from VfL Osnabrück to a one-year contract.

On 19 June, Araz announced the signing of Bruno Franco from Lokomotiv Sofia to a one-year contract.

On 22 June, Araz announced the signing of Patrick Andrade from Qarabağ to a one-year contract, with the option of an additional year, and the signing of Charles Boli from Apollon Limassol also to a one-year contract.

On 1 July, Araz announced the signing of Hamidou Keyta from Konyaspor to a one-year contract.

On 2 July, Neftçi announced that they would sign Igor Ribeiro to a two-year contract from Araz, with the contract commencing on 1 August after Araz had played their UEFA Conference League Second qualifying round matches against Aris Thessaloniki.

On 25 July, Araz announced the signing of Rahil Mammadov from Radomiak Radom to a one-year contract.

On 25 August, Araz announced the signing of Coşqun Diniyev from Çorum to a one-year contract.

On 25 December, Araz announced that their contracts with Elmar Bakhshiyev and Qara Qarayev had been terminated by mutual agreement.

On 4 January, Araz announced the appointment of Andriy Demchenko as their new head coach on a contract until the summer of 2027.

On 3 February, Araz announced that their contract with Elçin Mustafayev had been terminated by mutual agreement.

== Squad ==
As of match played 23 May 2026

No.	Name	Nationality	Position	Date of birth (age)	Signed from	Signed in	Contract ends	Apps.	Goals
Goalkeepers
12	Cristian Avram	(Moldova)	GK	27 July 1994 (age 32)	Petrocub Hîncești	2023		102	0
94	Tarlan Ahmadli	(Azerbaijan)	GK	21 November 1994 (age 31)	Turan Tovuz	2024		15	0
Defenders
3	Bekhtiyar Hasanalizade	(Azerbaijan)	DF	29 December 1992 (age 33)	Tuzlaspor	2024		49	3
4	Rahil Mammadov	(Azerbaijan)	DF	24 November 1995 (age 30)	Radomiak Radom	2025	2026	22	0
5	Slavik Alxasov	(Azerbaijan)	DF	6 February 1993 (age 33)	Turan Tovuz	2024		62	2
17	Issouf Paro	(Burkina Faso)	DF	16 October 1994 (age 32)	Concarneau	2024		58	4
26	Omar Buludov	(Azerbaijan)	DF	15 December 1998 (age 27)	Neftçi	2024		49	1
34	Ürfan Abbasov	(Azerbaijan)	DF	14 October 1992 (age 34)	Gabala	2024		65	1
77	Bruno Franco	(Brazil)	DF	10 April 1998 (age 28)	Lokomotiv Sofia	2025	2026	27	0
Midfielders
6	Patrick Andrade	(Cape Verde)	MF	9 February 1993 (age 33)	Qarabağ	2025	2026(+1)	36	6
8	Coşqun Diniyev	(Azerbaijan)	MF	13 September 1995 (age 31)	Çorum	2025	2026	25	1
9	Ayyoub Allach	(Morocco)	MF	28 January 1998 (age 28)	Sheriff Tiraspol	2025	2025(+1)	8	0
19	Bar Cohen	(Israel)	MF	10 March 2001 (age 25)	Maccabi Netanya	2025	2026	29	1
23	Nuno Rodrigues	(Portugal)	MF	30 November 1994 (aged 29)	Sporting da Covilhã	2023		111	3
24	Mustafa Ahmadzada	(Azerbaijan)	MF	12 August 2003 (age 23)	CF Montañesa	2024		46	0
29	Wanderson Maranhão	(Brazil)	MF	26 July 1994 (aged 29)	Chornomorets Odesa	2023		90	1
86	Ibrahim Piriyev	(Azerbaijan)	MF	18 May 2005 (age 21)	Academy	2025		1	0
Forwards
7	Hamidou Keyta	(France)	FW	17 December 1994 (age 31)	Konyaspor	2025	2026	33	3
10	Felipe Santos	(Benin)	FW	3 January 1997 (age 29)	Hapoel Haifa	2024		67	22
11	Ba-Muaka Simakala	(Germany)	FW	28 January 1997 (age 29)	VfL Osnabrück	2025	2026	36	9
14	Ulvi Isgandarov	(Azerbaijan)	FW	24 October 1997 (age 29)	Gabala	2024		66	6
16	Ramon Machado	(Brazil)	FW	4 April 1991 (age 35)	Sabah	2024		55	10
70	Charles Boli	(France)	FW	30 August 1998 (age 28)	Apollon Limassol	2025	2026	34	6
Out on loan
Left during the season
2	Qara Qarayev	(Azerbaijan)	MF	12 October 1992 (age 34)	Unattached	2024		37	0
4	Igor Ribeiro	(Brazil)	DF	4 October 1996 (age 30)	Tacuary	2023		68	1
22	Elçin Mustafayev	(Azerbaijan)	DF	5 July 2000 (age 26)	Shamakhi	2023		30	0

== Transfers ==
=== In ===
Date	Position	Nationality	Name	From	Fee	Ref.
12 June 2025	MF	(Israel)	Bar Cohen	Maccabi Netanya	Undisclosed	
17 June 2025	FW	(Germany)	Ba-Muaka Simakala	VfL Osnabrück	Undisclosed	
19 June 2025	DF	(Brazil)	Bruno Franco	Lokomotiv Sofia	Undisclosed	
22 June 2025	MF	(Cape Verde)	Patrick Andrade	Qarabağ	Undisclosed	
22 June 2025	FW	(France)	Charles Boli	Apollon Limassol	Undisclosed	
1 July 2025	FW	(France)	Hamidou Keyta	Konyaspor	Undisclosed	
25 July 2025	DF	(Azerbaijan)	Rahil Mammadov	Radomiak Radom	Undisclosed	
25 August 2025	MF	(Azerbaijan)	Coşqun Diniyev	Çorum	Undisclosed	

=== Out ===
Date	Position	Nationality	Name	To	Fee	Ref.
1 August 2025	DF	(Brazil)	Igor Ribeiro	Neftçi	Undisclosed	

=== Released ===
Date	Position	Nationality	Name	Joined	Date	Ref
18 June 2025	MF	(Brazil)	Jatobá	Daegu		
18 June 2025	MF	(Paraguay)	César Meza Colli			
18 June 2025	MF	(Portugal)	Benny	Petro de Luanda	26 August 2025	
18 June 2025	FW	(Bosnia and Herzegovina)	Mićo Kuzmanović	Velež Mostar	4 September 2025	
25 December 2025	MF	(Azerbaijan)	Qara Qarayev			
3 February 2026	DF	(Azerbaijan)	Elçin Mustafayev	Mingəçevir		

== Friendlies ==
10 January 2026	Araz-Naxçıvan	7–0	Araz-Naxçıvan-2	Baku
15:30 AZT (UTC+4)	Simakala; Diniyev; Keyta; Isgandarov; Alxasov; Ramon; Cohen	Report		Stadium: Baku Olympic Stadium

14 January 2026	Araz-Naxçıvan	0–1	Gabala	Baku
15:00 AZT (UTC+4)		Report	Owusu 38'	Stadium: Baku Olympic Stadium

18 January 2026	Araz-Naxçıvan	4–0	Zagatala	Baku
AZT (UTC+4)	Boli; Andrade; Keyta; Isgandarov	Report		Stadium: Baku Olympic Stadium

== Competitions ==
=== Overview ===
Competition	First match	Last match	Starting round	Final position	Record							
Competition	First match	Last match	Starting round	Final position	Pld	W	D	L	GF	GA	GD	Win %
Premier League	15 August 2025	23 May 2026	Matchday 1	6th	33	13	7	13	44	58	−14	39.39
Azerbaijan Cup	4 December 2025	4 December 2025	Round of 16	Round of 16	1	0	0	1	0	1	−1	0.00
UEFA Conference League	24 July 2025	14 August 2025	Second qualifying round	Third qualifying round	4	1	1	2	4	12	−8	25.00
Total					38	14	8	16	48	71	−23	36.84

Last updated: 23 May 2026
Source: Competitions

=== Premier League ===
==== Table ====
Pos	Team	Pld	W	D	L	GF	GA	GD	Pts	Qualification or relegation
4	Neftçi	33	16	11	6	57	32	+25	59 (Note: Matches won: Turan-Tovuz 17, Neftçi 16.)	Qualification for the Conference League second qualifying round
5	Zira	33	13	14	6	43	36	+7	53	Qualification for the Conference League first qualifying round
6	Araz-Naxçıvan	33	13	7	13	44	58	−14	46	
7	Sumgayit	33	12	5	16	45	49	−4	41	
8	Shamakhi	33	9	11	13	31	40	−9	38	

Source: Soccerway
Rules for classification: 1) Points; 2) Matches won; 3) Goal difference; 4) Goals scored; 5) Head-to-head points; 6) Head-to-head goal difference; 7) Lower number of points based on yellow and red cards; 8) Draw.

==== Results summary ====
Overall								Home						Away					
Pld	W	D	L	GF	GA	GD	Pts	W	D	L	GF	GA	GD	W	D	L	GF	GA	GD
33	13	7	13	44	58	−14	46	9	2	5	23	22	+1	4	5	8	21	36	−15

Last updated: 23 May 2026.
Source: See Results

==== Results by round ====
Round	1	2	3	4	5	6	7	8	9	10	11	12	13	14	15	16	17	18	19	20	21	22	23	24	25	26	27	28	29	30	31	32	33
Ground	A	A	H	A	H	A	H	A	H	A	H	H	A	H	A	H	A	H	A	H	A	H	A	H	A	H	A	H	A	H	A	H	H
Result	D	W	W	W	L	D	W	D	D	L	W	W	L	W	L	W	D	L	L	W	W	L	L	W	W	L	L	L	D	L	L	W	W
Position	3	3	3	1	3	4	2	3	4	5	5	6	6	6	6	5	5	6	7	7	5	5	5	5	5	6	6	6	6	6	7	6	6

Updated to match(es) played on 23 May 2026. Source: See Results
A = Away; H = Home; W = Win; D = Draw; L = Loss

==== Results ====
19 August 2025 1	Zira	1–1	Araz-Naxçıvan	Zirə
20:00 AZT (UTC+4)	Renato (yellow card) 17'; Djibrilla 45+1'; Volkovi (yellow card) 75'	Report	Andrade (yellow card) 43'; Santos (yellow card) 55'; Hasanalizade 65'	Stadium: Zira Olympic Sport Complex Stadium; Attendance: 1,000; Referee: Rəvan Həmzəzadə

24 August 2025 2	Turan Tovuz	1–2	Araz-Naxçıvan	Baku
19:30 AZT (UTC+4)	Serrano 77' (pen.)	Report	Rodrigues (yellow card) 24'; Boli 38'; Simakala 52'; Mammadov (yellow card) 74'; Santos (yellow card) 79'; Keyta (yellow card) 87'	Stadium: Azersun Arena; Attendance: 900; Referee: Tural Qurbanov

30 August 2025 3	Araz-Naxçıvan	2–1	Gabala	Baku
20:30 AZT (UTC+4)	Simakala 30'; Santos 33'; Andrade (yellow card) 45'	Report	Rashidov (yellow card) 4'; Ba Loua 9'; Sangaré (yellow card) 12'; Damadayev (yellow card) 21'	Stadium: Dalga Arena; Attendance: 100; Referee: Elçin Məsiyev

12 September 2025 4	Kapaz	0–2	Araz-Naxçıvan	Qabala
17:45 AZT (UTC+4)		Report	Alxasov 65'; Cohen 86'	Stadium: City Stadium; Attendance: 200; Referee: Rauf Cabarov

21 September 2025 5	Araz-Naxçıvan	0–5	Qarabağ	Baku
17:00 (UTC+4)	Alxasov (yellow card) 11' (yellow-red card) 28'; Abbasov (yellow card) 50'; Santos (yellow card) 60'; Andrade (yellow card) 87'	Report	Bayramov 4', 28' (pen.), 65' (pen.); Qurbanlı 52'; Kouakou 86'	Stadium: Dalga Arena; Attendance: 450; Referee: Aliyar Aghayev

27 September 2025 6	Şamaxı	1–1	Araz-Naxçıvan	Shamakhi
15:30 AZT (UTC+4)	Abbasov 28'; Msanga (yellow card) 44'; Suleymanov (yellow card) 85'	Report	Andrade (yellow card) 54'; Wanderson (yellow card) 56'; Hasanalizade (yellow card) 69'; Boli 73'; Franco (yellow card) 78'; Isgandarov (yellow card) 90'	Stadium: City Stadium; Attendance: 1,200; Referee: Rəşad Əhmədov

3 October 2025 7	Araz-Naxçıvan	2–0	İmişli	Baku
17:00 AZT (UTC+4)	Wanderson (yellow card) 8'; Simakala 33' (yellow card) 65'; Isgandarov 90+5'	Report	Isayev (yellow card) 60'; Salahlı (yellow card) 62'; Ingilabli (yellow card) 72'; Almeida (penalty missed) 90+2'	Stadium: Dalga Arena; Attendance: 150; Referee: Javid Jalilov

19 October 2025 8	Neftçi	2–2	Araz-Naxçıvan	Baku
18:30 AZT (UTC+4)	Sambou 19'; Ribeiro (yellow card) 28'; D'Almeida (yellow card) 33'; Vargas (yellow card) 62'; Ortíz (yellow card) 78'	Report	Santos (yellow card) 28'; Simakala 36', 47'	Stadium: Neftçi Arena; Attendance: 2,800; Referee: Fərid Hacıyev

25 October 2025 9	Araz-Naxçıvan	2–2	Sabah	Baku
16:00 AZT (UTC+4)	Diniyev (yellow card) 31'; Simakala (yellow card) 38' (goal) 90+9'; Paro 59'	Report	Lepinjica (yellow card) 33'; Solvet (yellow card) 39' (goal) 55'; Dashdamirov (yellow card) 48'; Mickels 73' (pen.)	Stadium: Dalga Arena; Attendance: 250; Referee: Rəşad Əhmədov

2 November 2025 10	Sumgayit	3–2	Araz-Naxçıvan	Sumgait
18:30 AZT (UTC+4)	Kahat 17', 79'; Ramalingom (yellow card) 36'; Janković (yellow card) 43'; Vásquez 69'; Dzhenetov (yellow card) 90+3'	Report	Boli 41'; Andrade 51' (yellow card) 84'	Stadium: City Stadium; Attendance: 1,200; Referee: Tural Qurbanov

8 November 2025 11	Araz-Naxçıvan	2–1	Karvan	Sumgait
15:44 AZT (UTC+4)	Ramon (yellow card) 57'; Keyta 65'; Isgandarov (yellow card) 70'; Santos 90+2' (pen.)	Report	Abdullayev 17' (yellow card) 69'; Barker (yellow card) 59'; Abdullayev (yellow card) 90'	Stadium: City Stadium; Attendance: 120; Referee: Nijat Ismailli

22 November 2025 12	Araz-Naxçıvan	1–1	Turan Tovuz	Sumgait
15:00 AZT (UTC+4)	Simakala 21' (yellow card) 44'; Hasanalizade (yellow card) 32'; Andrade (yellow card) 77'	Report	Jô (yellow card) 54'; Silva (yellow card) 60'; Najafov (yellow card) 77'; Guseynov 79'	Stadium: City Stadium; Attendance: 250; Referee: Rəvan Həmzəzadə

30 November 2025 13	Gabala	2–1	Araz-Naxçıvan	Qabala
16:30 AZT (UTC+4)	Owusu 15'; Musayev (yellow card) 39' (yellow-red card) 90+4'; Ba Loua 59'; Ağayev (yellow card) 78'	Report	Hasanalizade (yellow card) 28' (goal) 34'; Andrade (yellow card) 57'; Simakala (yellow card) 73'	Stadium: City Stadium; Attendance: 700; Referee: Kamal Umudlu

9 December 2025 14	Araz-Naxçıvan	2–0	Kapaz	Baku
17:00 AZT (UTC+4)	Diniyev 38'; Wanderson (yellow card) 40'; Andrade 65'; Boli (yellow card) 84'	Report	Nabiyev (yellow card) 31'; Seyidov (yellow card) 36'	Stadium: Dalga Arena; Attendance: 100; Referee: İnqilab Məmmədov

14 December 2025 15	Qarabağ	5–1	Araz-Naxçıvan	Baku
17:30 AZT (UTC+4)	Bayramov 31', 90+4' (pen.); Akhundzade 41'; Montiel 57' (pen.); Andrade (yellow card) 66' (goal) 72'	Report	Rodrigues (yellow card) 37'; Wanderson (yellow card) 66'; Ramon 76' (pen.); Abbasov (yellow card) 86'; Simakala (yellow card) 90+2'	Stadium: Azersun Arena; Attendance: 700; Referee: Rəşad Əhmədov

21 December 2025 16	Araz-Naxçıvan	2–0	Şamaxı	Baku
17:30 AZT (UTC+4)	Andrade 55'; Ahmadzada (yellow card) 75'; Boli 87'	Report	Agjabayov (yellow card) 75'	Stadium: Dalga Arena; Attendance: 120; Referee: Fərid Hacıyev

23 January 2026 17	İmişli	2–2	Araz-Naxçıvan	Quba
14:30 AZT (UTC+4)	Juninho 5'; Morgan (yellow card) 14'; Moses (yellow card) 29'; Ronaldo (yellow card) 53'; Almeida 84' (yellow card) 85'; Isayev (yellow card) 90+1'	Report	Abbasov (yellow card) 2'; Boli 14'; Alxasov (yellow card) 49'; Simakala (yellow card) 71'; Hasanalizade (yellow card) 85'; Ramon 90+1'	Stadium: City Stadium; Attendance: 60; Referee: İnqilab Məmmədov

1 February 2026 18	Araz-Naxçıvan	0–4	Neftçi	Baku
16:00 AZT (UTC+4)	Franco (yellow card) 12'	Report	Ribeiro 4' (yellow card) 71'; Vargas (yellow card) 15'; Sambou 40'; Curci 84'; Aboubakar 90+2'	Stadium: Dalga Arena; Attendance: 500; Referee: Rauf Cabarov

8 February 2026 19	Sabah	4–1	Araz-Naxçıvan	Masazir
16:00 AZT (UTC+4)	Rakhmonaliev 9' (pen.); Malouda 11'; Aliyev 16', 68' (yellow card) 71'; Solvet (yellow card) 66'	Report	Hasanalizade (yellow card) 37'; Ahmadzada (yellow card) 59'; Andrade (yellow card) 80'; Buludov (yellow card) 82'; Santos 86'	Stadium: Bank Respublika Arena; Attendance: 951; Referee: Tural Qurbanov

15 February 2026 20	Araz-Naxçıvan	1–0	Sumgayit	Baku
17:00 AZT (UTC+4)	Cohen (yellow card) 30'; Ramon 45+5' (pen.); Ahmadzada (yellow card) 62'; Mammadov (yellow card) 66'; Diniyev (yellow card) 67'; Alxasov (yellow card) 87'	Report	Ramalingom (red card) 74'; Haghverdi (yellow card) 90+3'	Stadium: Dalga Arena; Attendance: 150; Referee: Elçin Məsiyev

21 February 2026 21	Karvan	0–2	Araz-Naxçıvan	Yevlakh
14:30 AZT (UTC+4)		Report	Santos 32', 50' (pen.); Alxasov (yellow card) 84'	Stadium: City Stadium; Attendance: 1,000; Referee: İnqilab Məmmədov

27 February 2026 22	Araz-Naxçıvan	0–1	Zira	Baku
18:00 AZT (UTC+4)	Rodrigues (yellow card) 64'; Diniyev (yellow card) FT	Report	Gomis 68'; Guima (yellow card) 82'; Nuriyev (yellow card) 90+2'; Mutsinzi (yellow card) 90+3'	Stadium: Dalga Arena; Attendance: 60; Referee: Rauf Cabarov

8 March 2026 23	Qarabağ	6–0	Araz-Naxçıvan	Baku
19:15 AZT (UTC+4)	Montiel 15' (pen.); Andrade 33', 36'; Durán 64' (pen.), 89'; Qurbanlı 83'	Report	Ahmadzada (yellow card) 42'; Paro (yellow card) 62'	Stadium: Azersun Arena; Attendance: 3,200; Referee: Rəşad Əhmədov

13 March 2026 24	Araz-Naxçıvan	2–1	Karvan	Baku
18:30 AZT (UTC+4)	Hasanalizade (yellow card) 14'; Simakala (yellow card) 17' (goal) 40'; Keyta 38'; Diniyev (yellow card) 87'	Report	Spence 51'; Jahangirov (yellow card) 76'; Bulud (yellow card) 76'	Stadium: Dalga Arena; Attendance: 70; Referee: Kamranbəy Rəhimov

18 March 2026 25	Şamaxı	0–1	Araz-Naxçıvan	Shamakhi
15:00 AZT (UTC+4)	Apolinário (yellow card) 15'; Fernandes (yellow card) 81'; Ismayilov (yellow card) 90'	Report	Andrade 12'; Veremeev 57' (o.g.); Ahmadli (yellow card) 85'	Stadium: City Stadium; Attendance: 600; Referee: İnqilab Məmmədov

7 April 2026 26	Araz-Naxçıvan	2–4	Sabah	Baku
19:30 AZT (UTC+4)	Santos 7' (yellow card) 44'; Keyta 26' (yellow card) 61'; Diniyev (yellow card) 70'; Abbasov (yellow card) 90+6'	Report	Simić 14'; Mickels 37' (pen.), 62' (pen.); Parris 81'	Stadium: Dalga Arena; Attendance: 300; Referee: Fərid Hacıyev

11 April 2026 27	Neftçi	2–1	Araz-Naxçıvan	Baku
20:00 AZT (UTC+4)	Faraj 32'; Almeida 57'	Report	Andrade (yellow card) 20'; Alxasov 65'; Cohen (yellow card) 81'; Buludov (yellow card) 90'	Stadium: Neftçi Arena; Attendance: 2,200; Referee: Əli Əliyev

17 April 2026 28	Araz-Naxçıvan	0–3	Turan Tovuz	Baku
17:00 AZT (UTC+4)	Hasanalizade (yellow card) 84'; Santos (yellow card) 90+3'	Report	Wadji (yellow card) 46' (goal) 72'; Jô (yellow card) 52' (goal) 82', 90+2'; Hackman (yellow card) 87'; Yusifli (yellow card) 90+3'	Stadium: Dalga Arena; Attendance: 500; Referee: Rauf Cabarov

25 April 2026 29	Gabala	1–1	Araz-Naxçıvan	Qabala
18:30 AZT (UTC+4)	Sierra (yellow card) 28'; Musayev (yellow card) 45'; Buludov 75' (o.g.)	Report	Avram (yellow card) 63'; Paro 82'	Stadium: City Stadium; Attendance: 250; Referee: Kamal Umudlu

2 May 2026 30	Araz-Naxçıvan	0–1	İmişli	Baku
18:30 AZT (UTC+4)		Report	Cardoso 18'; Moses (yellow card) 65'; Juninho (yellow card) 71'	Stadium: Dalga Arena; Attendance: 100; Referee: Vüqar Həsənli

9 May 2026 31	Sumgayit	2–1	Araz-Naxçıvan	Sumgait
19:30 AZT (UTC+4)	Ramalingom 45+2'; Ninković (yellow card) 54'; Mammadov 90+3' (o.g.)	Report	Boli (yellow card) 54'; Simakala 63'	Stadium: City Stadium; Attendance: 1,100; Referee: Rəvan Həmzəzadə

15 May 2026 32	Araz-Naxçıvan	2–0	Kapaz	Baku
19:30 AZT (UTC+4)	Franco (yellow card) 23'; Andrade 36'; Rodrigues (yellow card) 43'; Mammadov (yellow card) 55'; Ramon 75'	Report	Seyidov (yellow card) 34'; Isaqov (yellow card) 88'	Stadium: Dalga Arena; Attendance: 350; Referee: Rəşad Əhmədov

23 May 2026 33	Araz-Naxçıvan	3–2	Zira	Baku
19:00 AZT (UTC+4)	Andrade 15'; Mammadov (yellow card) 18'; Santos 33'; Ramon 73'	Report	Renato (yellow card) 33' (goal) 69'; Konaté (yellow card) 50'; Júnior 83' (penalty missed) 90+6'	Stadium: Dalga Arena; Attendance: 200; Referee: Əkbər Əhmədov

=== Azerbaijan Cup ===
4 December 2025 Last 16	Araz-Naxçıvan	0–1 (a.e.t.)	Kapaz	Baku
19:00 AZT (UTC+4)	Ahmadzada (yellow card) 45+1'; Hasanalizade (yellow card) 98'	Report	Bento (yellow card) 31'; Hüseynli (yellow card) 88'; Ohori (yellow card) 90+3' (goal) 116'; Abilov (yellow card) 100'; Verdasca (yellow card) 120'	Stadium: Dalga Arena; Attendance: 250; Referee: Cavid Cəlilov

=== UEFA Conference League ===
==== Qualifying rounds ====
24 July 2025 Second qualifying round 1st leg	Araz-Naxçıvan (Azerbaijan)	2–1	(Greece) Aris	Baku, Azerbaijan
20:00 AZT (UTC+4)	Santos 75'; Andrade 78'	Report	Morón 66'	Stadium: Dalga Arena; Attendance: 1,800; Referee: Andrei Chivulete (Romania)
Note: Araz-Naxçıvan played their home match at the Neftçi Arena in Baku, instead of their regular stadium, the Nakhchivan City Stadium, in Nakhchivan, which did not meet UEFA requirements.

31 July 2025 Second qualifying round 2nd leg	Aris (Greece)	2–2 (3–4 agg.)	(Azerbaijan) Araz-Naxçıvan	Thessaloniki, Greece
22:15 AZT (UTC+4)	Leismann 62'; Monchu 90'	Report	Boli 11'; Santos 38' (pen.)	Stadium: Kleanthis Vikelidis Stadium; Attendance: 14,897; Referee: David Dickinson (Scotland)

7 August 2025 Third qualifying round 1st leg	Araz-Naxçıvan (Azerbaijan)	0–4	(Cyprus) Omonia	Baku, Azerbaijan
20:00 AZT (UTC+4)		Report	Loizou 13', 22'; Ewandro 55'; Jovetić 58'	Stadium: Dalga Arena; Attendance: 4,200; Referee: Ondřej Berka (Czech Republic)
Note: Araz-Naxçıvan played their home match at the Neftçi Arena in Baku, instead of their regular stadium, the Nakhchivan City Stadium, in Nakhchivan, which did not meet UEFA requirements.

14 August 2025 Third qualifying round 2nd leg	Omonia (Cyprus)	5–0 (9–0 agg.)	(Azerbaijan) Araz-Naxçıvan	Nicosia, Cyprus
21:00 AZT (UTC+4)	Semedo 9'; Jovetić 23'; Ewandro 30', 45+4'; Musiałowski 79'	Report		Stadium: GSP Stadium; Attendance: 6,523; Referee: Jakob Kehlet (Denmark)

== Squad statistics ==
As of match played 23 May 2026

=== Appearances and goals ===
No.	Pos	Nat	Player	Total		Premier League		Azerbaijan Cup		UEFA Conference League	
No.	Pos	Nat	Player	Apps	Goals	Apps	Goals	Apps	Goals	Apps	Goals
3	DF	(Azerbaijan) AZE	Bekhtiyar Hasanalizade	28	2	22+2	2	1	0	3	0
4	DF	(Azerbaijan) AZE	Rahil Mammadov	22	0	19+1	0	0	0	1+1	0
5	DF	(Azerbaijan) AZE	Slavik Alxasov	27	2	19+5	2	0+1	0	0+2	0
6	MF	(Cape Verde) CPV	Patrick Andrade	35	6	28+2	5	1	0	4	1
7	FW	(France) FRA	Hamidou Keyta	33	3	16+12	3	1	0	1+3	0
8	MF	(Azerbaijan) AZE	Coşqun Diniyev	26	1	19+6	1	1	0	0	0
10	FW	(Benin) BEN	Felipe Santos	31	9	25+2	7	0	0	4	2
11	FW	(Germany) GER	Ba-Muaka Simakala	35	9	24+6	9	1	0	4	0
12	GK	(Moldova) MDA	Cristian Avram	28	0	22+1	0	1	0	4	0
14	FW	(Azerbaijan) AZE	Ulvi Isgandarov	25	1	2+20	1	1	0	0+2	0
16	FW	(Brazil) BRA	Ramon Machado	23	5	9+13	5	0+1	0	0	0
17	DF	(Burkina Faso) BFA	Issouf Paro	26	2	19+3	2	1	0	2+1	0
19	MF	(Israel) ISR	Bar Cohen	29	1	9+15	1	0+1	0	3+1	0
23	MF	(Portugal) POR	Nuno Rodrigues	33	0	19+9	0	0+1	0	1+3	0
24	MF	(Azerbaijan) AZE	Mustafa Ahmadzada	27	0	16+10	0	1	0	0	0
26	DF	(Azerbaijan) AZE	Omar Buludov	24	0	14+6	0	1	0	1+2	0
29	MF	(Brazil) BRA	Wanderson Maranhão	20	0	14+2	0	0	0	4	0
34	DF	(Azerbaijan) AZE	Ürfan Abbasov	27	0	19+5	0	0	0	3	0
70	FW	(France) FRA	Charles Boli	33	6	20+9	5	0+1	0	3	1
77	DF	(Brazil) BRA	Bruno Franco	27	0	14+8	0	1	0	4	0
86	MF	(Azerbaijan) AZE	Ibrahim Piriyev	1	0	0+1	0	0	0	0	0
94	GK	(Azerbaijan) AZE	Tarlan Ahmadli	11	0	11	0	0	0	0	0
Players away on loan:
Players who left Araz-Naxçıvan during the season:
2	MF	(Azerbaijan) AZE	Qara Qarayev	13	0	2+7	0	0+1	0	0+3	0
4	DF	(Brazil) BRA	Igor Ribeiro	2	0	0	0	0	0	2	0

=== Goal scorers ===
Place	Position	Nation	Number	Name	Premier League	Azerbaijan Cup	UEFA Conference League	Total
1	FW	(Germany)	11	Ba-Muaka Simakala	9	0	0	9
1	FW	(Benin)	10	Felipe Santos	7	0	2	9
3	FW	(France)	70	Charles Boli	5	0	1	6
3	MF	(Cape Verde)	6	Patrick Andrade	5	0	1	6
5	FW	(Brazil)	16	Ramon Machado	5	0	0	5
6	FW	(France)	7	Hamidou Keyta	3	0	0	3
7	DF	(Azerbaijan)	3	Bekhtiyar Hasanalizade	2	0	0	2
7	DF	(Azerbaijan)	5	Slavik Alxasov	2	0	0	2
7	DF	(Burkina Faso)	17	Issouf Paro	2	0	0	2
10	MF	(Israel)	19	Bar Cohen	1	0	0	1
10	FW	(Azerbaijan)	14	Ulvi Isgandarov	1	0	0	1
10	MF	(Azerbaijan)	8	Coşqun Diniyev	1	0	0	1
10				Own goal	1	0	0	1
				TOTALS	42	0	4	46

=== Clean sheets ===
Place	Position	Nation	Number	Name	Premier League	Azerbaijan Cup	UEFA Conference League	Total
1	GK	(Moldova)	12	Cristian Avram	6	0	0	6
2	GK	(Azerbaijan)	94	Tarlan Ahmadli	2	0	0	2
				TOTALS	8	0	0	8

=== Disciplinary record ===
Number	Nation	Position	Name	Premier League		Azerbaijan Cup		UEFA Conference League		Total	
Number	Nation	Position	Name	Yellow card	Red card	Yellow card	Red card	Yellow card	Red card	Yellow card	Red card
3	(Azerbaijan)	DF	Bekhtiyar Hasanalizade	7	0	1	0	3	0	11	0
4	(Azerbaijan)	DF	Rahil Mammadov	4	0	0	0	0	0	4	0
5	(Azerbaijan)	DF	Slavik Alxasov	5	1	0	0	1	0	6	1
6	(Cape Verde)	MF	Patrick Andrade	10	0	0	0	2	0	12	0
7	(France)	FW	Hamidou Keyta	2	0	0	0	1	0	3	0
8	(Azerbaijan)	MF	Coşqun Diniyev	5	0	0	0	0	0	5	0
10	(Benin)	FW	Felipe Santos	6	0	0	0	1	0	7	0
11	(Germany)	FW	Ba-Muaka Simakala	7	0	0	0	2	0	9	0
12	(Moldova)	GK	Cristian Avram	1	0	0	0	1	0	2	0
14	(Azerbaijan)	FW	Ulvi Isgandarov	2	0	0	0	0	0	2	0
16	(Brazil)	FW	Ramon Machado	1	0	0	0	0	0	1	0
17	(Burkina Faso)	DF	Issouf Paro	1	0	0	0	0	0	1	0
19	(Israel)	MF	Bar Cohen	2	0	0	0	0	0	2	0
23	(Portugal)	MF	Nuno Rodrigues	4	0	0	0	0	0	4	0
24	(Azerbaijan)	MF	Mustafa Ahmadzada	4	0	1	0	0	0	5	0
26	(Azerbaijan)	DF	Omar Buludov	2	0	0	0	0	0	2	0
29	(Brazil)	MF	Wanderson Maranhão	4	0	0	0	2	0	6	0
34	(Azerbaijan)	DF	Ürfan Abbasov	4	0	0	0	1	0	5	0
70	(France)	FW	Charles Boli	2	0	0	0	1	0	3	0
77	(Brazil)	DF	Bruno Franco	3	0	0	0	1	0	4	0
94	(Azerbaijan)	GK	Tarlan Ahmadli	1	0	0	0	0	0	1	0
Players away on loan:
Players who left Araz-Naxçıvan during the season:
2	(Azerbaijan)	MF	Qara Qarayev	0	0	0	0	1	0	1	0
4	(Brazil)	DF	Igor Ribeiro	0	0	0	0	2	1	2	1
			TOTALS	77	1	2	0	19	1	98	2
