= 2024–25 Araz-Naxçıvan PFK season =

Araz-Naxçıvan
2024-25 season
- Manager: Elmar Bakhshiyev
- Stadium: Dalga Arena
- Premier League: 3rd
- Azerbaijan Cup: Semifinal vs Qarabağ
- Top goalscorer: League: Felipe Santos (10); All: Felipe Santos (13)
- Highest home attendance: 600 (vs Qarabağ, 2 August 2024)
- Lowest home attendance: 70 (vs Sabail, 22 February 2025)
- Average home league attendance: 256

The Araz-Naxçıvan PFK 2024–25 season was Araz-Naxçıvan's second season back in the Azerbaijan Premier League since 2014–15.

== Season events ==
On 29 May, Araz announced the signings of Ulvi Isgandarov and Ürfan Abbasov from Gabala, Omar Buludov from Neftçi and Tarlan Ahmadli from Turan Tovuz, all to one-year contracts.

On 20 June, Araz announced the signing of Turan Valizade from Neftçi to a one-year contract.

On 5 July, Araz announced the signing of Jatobá from Politehnica Iași.

On 6 July, Araz announced the signing of Bekhtiyar Hasanalizade from Tuzlaspor to a one-year contract.

On 9 July, Araz announced the signing of Benny from Torreense to a one-year contract.

On 10 July, Araz announced the signing of Felipe Santos from Hapoel Haifa to a one-year contract.

On 22 July, Araz announced the signing of Ramon Machado from Malaysian club Sabah to a one-year contract.

On 7 August, Araz announced the signing of Slavik Alxasov from Turan Tovuz on a contract until the end of the season.

On 17 September, Araz announced the season-long loan signing of Senan Ağalarov from Gabala.

On 15 October, Araz announced the signing of free-agent César Meza on a contract until the end of the season.

On 30 October, Araz announced the signing of free-agent Qara Qarayev.

On 6 February, Araz announced the signing of Ayyoub Allach from Sheriff Tiraspol, to a six-month contract, with the option of an additional year.

== Squad ==
As of match played 25 May 2025

No.	Name	Nationality	Position	Date of birth (age)	Signed from	Signed in	Contract ends	Apps.	Goals
Goalkeepers
1	Vusal Shabanov	(Azerbaijan)	GK	10 May 2002 (aged 23)	Zagatala	2022			
12	Cristian Avram	(Moldova)	GK	27 July 1994 (aged 30)	Petrocub Hîncești	2023		75	0
94	Tarlan Ahmadli	(Azerbaijan)	GK	21 November 1994 (aged 30)	Turan Tovuz	2024	2025	4	0
Defenders
2	Slavik Alxasov	(Azerbaijan)	DF	6 February 1993 (aged 32)	Turan Tovuz	2024	2025	35	0
3	Bekhtiyar Hasanalizade	(Azerbaijan)	DF	29 December 1992 (aged 32)	Tuzlaspor	2024	2025	21	1
4	Igor Ribeiro	(Brazil)	DF	4 October 1996 (aged 28)	Tacuary	2023		66	1
17	Issouf Paro	(Burkina Faso)	DF	16 October 1994 (aged 30)	Concarneau	2024		32	2
22	Elçin Mustafayev	(Azerbaijan)	DF	5 July 2000 (aged 24)	Shamakhi	2023		30	0
26	Omar Buludov	(Azerbaijan)	DF	15 December 1998 (aged 26)	Neftçi	2024	2025	25	1
34	Ürfan Abbasov	(Azerbaijan)	DF	14 October 1992 (aged 32)	Gabala	2024	2025	39	1
Midfielders
5	Qara Qarayev	(Azerbaijan)	MF	12 October 1992 (aged 32)	Unattached	2024		24	0
6	Vadim Abdullayev	(Azerbaijan)	MF	17 December 1994 (aged 30)	Unattached	2022			
8	Jatobá	(Brazil)	MF	15 September 1995 (aged 29)	Politehnica Iași	2024		17	0
9	Ayyoub Allach	(Morocco)	MF	28 January 1998 (aged 27)	Sheriff Tiraspol	2025	2025(+1)	8	0
10	Benny	(Portugal)	MF	4 January 1997 (aged 28)	Torreense	2024	2025	41	9
20	Turan Valizade	(Azerbaijan)	MF	1 January 2001 (aged 24)	Neftçi	2024	2025	5	0
21	César Meza	(Paraguay)	MF	5 October 1991 (aged 33)	Unattached	2024	2025	19	1
24	Mustafa Ahmadzada	(Azerbaijan)	MF	12 August 2003 (aged 21)	CF Montañesa	2024		19	0
29	Wanderson Maranhão	(Brazil)	MF	26 July 1994 (aged 29)	Chornomorets Odesa	2023		70	1
57	Elcan Mammadov	(Azerbaijan)	MF	1 July 2004 (aged 20)	Sabail	2024		2	1
88	Tuhay Alizade	(Azerbaijan)	MF	8 July 2002 (aged 22)	Kremin Kremenchuk	2022			
Forwards
7	Ulvi Isgandarov	(Azerbaijan)	FW	24 October 1997 (aged 27)	Gabala	2024	2024	40	5
11	Bayramali Qurbanov	(Azerbaijan)	FW	8 November 2002 (aged 22)	Sabail	2022			
14	Mićo Kuzmanović	(Bosnia and Herzegovina)	FW	18 March 1996 (aged 29)	Tuzla City	2024		30	1
16	Ramon	(Brazil)	FW	4 April 1991 (aged 34)	Sabah	2024	2025	32	5
23	Nuno Rodrigues	(Portugal)	MF	30 November 1994 (aged 29)	Sporting da Covilhã	2023		78	3
71	Senan Ağalarov	(Azerbaijan)	FW	12 May 2005 (aged 20)	on loan from Gabala	2024	2025	4	2
97	Felipe Santos	(Brazil)	FW	3 January 1997 (aged 28)	Hapoel Haifa	2024	2025	36	13
Out on loan
Left during the season

== Transfers ==
=== In ===
Date	Position	Nationality	Name	From	Fee	Ref.
29 May 2024	GK	(Azerbaijan)	Tarlan Ahmadli	Turan Tovuz	Undisclosed	
29 May 2024	DF	(Azerbaijan)	Ürfan Abbasov	Gabala	Undisclosed	
29 May 2024	DF	(Azerbaijan)	Omar Buludov	Neftçi	Undisclosed	
29 May 2024	FW	(Azerbaijan)	Ulvi Isgandarov	Gabala	Undisclosed	
20 June 2024	MF	(Azerbaijan)	Turan Valizade	Neftçi	Undisclosed	
5 July 2024	MF	(Brazil)	Jatobá	Politehnica Iași	Undisclosed	
6 July 2024	DF	(Azerbaijan)	Bekhtiyar Hasanalizade	Tuzlaspor	Undisclosed	
9 July 2024	MF	(Portugal)	Benny	Torreense	Undisclosed	
10 July 2024	FW	(Brazil)	Felipe Santos	Hapoel Haifa	Undisclosed	
10 July 2024	FW	(Brazil)	Ramon Machado	Sabah	Undisclosed	
7 August 2024	DF	(Azerbaijan)	Slavik Alxasov	Turan Tovuz	Undisclosed	
15 October 2024	MF	(Paraguay)	César Meza	Unattached	Free	
30 October 2024	MF	(Azerbaijan)	Qara Qarayev	Unattached	Free	
6 February 2025	MF	(Morocco)	Ayyoub Allach	Sheriff Tiraspol	Undisclosed	

=== Loans in ===
Date from	Position	Nationality	Name	From	Date to	Ref.
17 September 2024	FW	(Azerbaijan)	Senan Ağalarov	Gabala	End of season	

=== Released ===
Date	Position	Nationality	Name	Joined	Date	Ref
11 June 2024	GK	(Bosnia and Herzegovina)	Semir Bukvic			
11 June 2024	DF	(Azerbaijan)	Turan Manafov	Kapaz		
11 June 2024	DF	(Azerbaijan)	Zamig Aliyev	Egnatia		
11 June 2024	DF	(Bosnia and Herzegovina)	Numan Kurdić	Kauno Žalgiris		
11 June 2024	MF	(Azerbaijan)	Tural Bayramlı	Turan Tovuz		
11 June 2024	MF	(Azerbaijan)	Nicat Süleymanov	Kapaz		
11 June 2024	MF	(Belgium)	Ismail Azzaoui	Omonia 29M	24 December 2024	
11 June 2024	MF	(France)	Axel Ngando			
11 June 2024	MF	(Ghana)	Mohammed Kadiri	Mohammedan		
11 June 2024	FW	(Azerbaijan)	Orkhan Aliyev	Kapaz		
11 June 2024	FW	(Democratic Republic of the Congo)	Elvis Mashike	Gostivari		

== Competitions ==
=== Overview ===
Competition	First match	Last match	Starting round	Final position	Record							
Competition	First match	Last match	Starting round	Final position	Pld	W	D	L	GF	GA	GD	Win %
Premier League	2 August 2024	25 May 2025	Matchday 1	3rd	36	15	13	8	34	29	+5	41.67
Azerbaijan Cup	29 October 2024	23 April 2025	Second Round	Semifinal	6	5	0	1	11	4	+7	83.33
Total					42	20	13	9	45	33	+12	47.62

Last updated: 25 May 2025
Source: Competitions

=== Premier League ===
==== Results summary ====
Overall								Home						Away					
Pld	W	D	L	GF	GA	GD	Pts	W	D	L	GF	GA	GD	W	D	L	GF	GA	GD
36	15	13	8	34	29	+5	58	7	7	4	18	17	+1	8	6	4	16	12	+4

Last updated: 25 May 2025.
Source: See Results

==== Results by round ====
Round	1	2	3	4	5	6	7	8	9	10	11	12	13	14	15	16	17	18	19	20	21	22	23	24	25	26	27	28	29	30	31	32	33	34	35	36
Ground	H	H	H	A	H	A	H	A	A	H	A	A	H	A	H	A	H	A	A	H	A	H	A	H	A	H	H	A	H	A	H	A	H	A	A	H
Result	L	W	D	W	W	W	W	D	W	D	W	W	W	W	W	W	L	L	L	W	D	D	L	D	D	L	D	D	W	D	D	D	D	L	W	L
Position																																				

Updated to match(es) played on 25 May 2025. Source: See Results
A = Away; H = Home; W = Win; D = Draw; L = Loss

==== Results ====
The league schedule was released on 19 July 2024.

2 August 2024 1	Araz-Naxçıvan	1–4	Qarabağ	Baku
20:00 AZT (UTC+4)	Nuno (yellow card) 74' (goal) 86'	Report	Xhixha 7'; Richard 9'; Keyta 47'; Cafarguliyev (yellow card) 51' (yellow-red card) 78'; Hüseynov 88'	Stadium: Dalga Arena; Attendance: 600; Referee: Elçin Məsiyev

10 August 2024 2	Araz-Naxçıvan	1–0	Shamakhi	Baku
18:45 AZT (UTC+4)	Ramon 60'; Wanderson (yellow card) 77'; Buludov (yellow card) 85'	Report	Naghiyev (yellow card) 15'; Konaté (yellow card) 71'	Stadium: Dalga Arena; Attendance: 200; Referee: Farid Hajiyev

24 August 2024 4	Araz-Naxçıvan	1–1	Neftçi	Baku
20:30 AZT (UTC+4)	Buludov 16' (yellow card) 79'; Kuzmanović (yellow card) 26'; Ribeiro (yellow card) 41'; Abdullayev (yellow card) 81'	Report	Kuč (yellow card) 38'; Seck (yellow card) 70'; Koffi (yellow card) 72'; Safarov (yellow card) 75'; Lebon (yellow card) 79'; Sheydayev 90+4'; Jafarov (yellow card) 90+5'	Stadium: Dalga Arena; Attendance: 450; Referee: İnqilab Məmmədov

30 August 2024 5	Sumgayit	0–1	Araz-Naxçıvan	Sumgait
20:00 AZT (UTC+4)	Muradov (yellow card) 59'; Rezabala (yellow card) 90'	Report	Ahmadli (yellow card) 23'; Hasanalizade (yellow card) 28'; Nuno (yellow card) 28'; Kuzmanović 56'; Wanderson (yellow card) 74'; Isgandarov (yellow card) 90'	Stadium: City Stadium; Attendance: 1,500; Referee: Javid Jalilov

13 September 2024 6	Araz-Naxçıvan	1–0	Kapaz	Baku
19:30 AZT (UTC+4)	Nuno (yellow card) 45'; Benny 76'; Buludov (yellow card) 84'	Report		Stadium: Dalga Arena; Attendance: 100; Referee: Rəvan Həmzəzadə

21 September 2024 7	Turan Tovuz	1–2	Araz-Naxçıvan	Tovuz
18:00 AZT (UTC+4)	Guseynov 48'; Konovalov (yellow card) 90+5'	Report	Abdullayev (yellow card) 8'; Ramon (yellow card) 14' (goal) 44'; Santos 57' (yellow card) 57'; Buludov (yellow card) 82'; Isgandarov (yellow card) 90+5'	Stadium: City Stadium; Attendance: 5,000; Referee: Elçin Məsiyev

27 September 2024 8	Araz-Naxçıvan	3–2	Sabail	Baku
19:00 AZT (UTC+4)	Santos (yellow card) 41' (goal) 57' (pen.); Hasanalizade 52'; Benny 84'	Report	Bilali (yellow card) 30'; Lytvyn (yellow card) 30'; Larrucea 45+1', 89'; Sofir (yellow card) 49'; Masimov (yellow card) 88'	Stadium: Dalga Arena; Attendance: 200; Referee: Rauf Allahverdiyev

5 October 2024 9	Sabah	1–1	Araz-Naxçıvan	Masazir
19:30 AZT (UTC+4)	Šafranko 5'; Letić (yellow card) 16'	Report	Santos 8' (yellow card) 76'	Stadium: Bank Respublika Arena; Attendance: 600; Referee: Cavid Cəlilov

19 October 2024 10	Shamakhi	0–1	Araz-Naxçıvan	Shamakhi
15:30 AZT (UTC+4)	Benteke (yellow card) 27'	Report	Santos 72'	Stadium: City Stadium; Attendance: 500; Referee: Farid Hajiyev

26 October 2024 11	Araz-Naxçıvan	1–1	Zira	Baku
16:00 AZT (UTC+4)	Wanderson (yellow card) 41'; Nuno (yellow card) 49'; Santos 89' (pen.)	Report	Papunashvili (yellow card) 30'	Stadium: Dalga Arena; Attendance: 80; Referee: Əliyar Ağayev

1 November 2024 12	Neftçi	0–1	Araz-Naxçıvan	Baku
20:30 AZT (UTC+4)	Safarov (yellow card) 90+2'	Report	Santos 30' (yellow card) 40'; Benny (yellow card) 86'; Valizade (yellow card) 86' (yellow-red card) 90+3'	Stadium: Neftçi Arena; Attendance: 1,324; Referee: Rəşad Əhmədov

6 November 2024 3	Zira	0–1	Araz-Naxçıvan	Zirə
19:00 AZT (UTC+4)	Renato (yellow card) 57'; Kuliyev (yellow card) 68'	Report	Buludov (yellow card) 35'; Abbasov 48' (yellow card) 88'; Ahmadzada (yellow card) 68'; Wanderson (yellow card) 80'; Mustafayev (yellow card) 90+1'; Avram (yellow card) 90+4'	Stadium: Zira Olympic Sport Complex Stadium; Attendance: 450; Referee: Rauf Cabarov

10 November 2024 13	Araz-Naxçıvan	1–0	Sumgayit	Baku
16:00 AZT (UTC+4)	Buludov (yellow card) 60'; Milović (yellow card) 73'; Isgandarov 87'	Report		Stadium: Dalga Arena; Attendance: 170; Referee: Kamal Umudlu

22 November 2024 14	Kapaz	0–2	Araz-Naxçıvan	Tovuz
17:00 AZT (UTC+4)	Ba (yellow card) 43'	Report	Santos 25'; Ribeiro (yellow card) 74'; Benny 85'; Alxasov (yellow card) 88'	Stadium: City Stadium; Attendance: 650; Referee: Elçin Məsiyev

29 November 2024 15	Araz-Naxçıvan	1–0	Turan Tovuz	Baku
16:00 AZT (UTC+4)	Wanderson (yellow card) 54'; Santos 75'; Avram (yellow card) 89'	Report	S.Aliyev (yellow card) 83'	Stadium: Dalga Arena; Attendance: 200; Referee: Cavid Cəlilov

7 December 2024 16	Sabail	0–2	Araz-Naxçıvan	Baku
15:00 AZT (UTC+4)	Lytvyn (yellow card) 45'; N.Quliyev (yellow card) 67'; Çelik (yellow card) 75'; Abdullazade (yellow card) 86'	Report	Ramon 45+2' (pen.); Benny 56'; Abbasov (yellow card) 87'	Stadium: Bayil Arena; Attendance: 500; Referee: Reshad Ahmedov

14 December 2024 17	Araz-Naxçıvan	0–1	Sabah	Baku
16:30 AZT (UTC+4)	Ramon (yellow card) 20'; Santos (yellow card) 38'	Report	Mickels (yellow card) 77' (goal) 78'	Stadium: Dalga Arena; Attendance: 200; Referee: İnqilab Məmmədov

22 December 2024 18	Qarabağ	2–0	Araz-Naxçıvan	Baku
16:30 AZT (UTC+4)	Akhundzade (yellow card) 35'; Benzia 41'; Zoubir 71'	Report		Stadium: Republican Stadium; Attendance: 1,100; Referee: Rəvan Həmzəzadə

18 January 2025 19	Zira	1–0	Araz-Naxçıvan	Zirə
16:00 AZT (UTC+4)	Ibrahimli 4'; Utzig (yellow card) 45'; Isayev (yellow card) 69'	Report	Qarayev (yellow card) 45'; Santos (yellow card) 84'	Stadium: Zira Olympic Sport Complex Stadium; Attendance: 700; Referee: Əliyar Ağayev

26 January 2025 20	Araz-Naxçıvan	2–1	Neftçi	Baku
16:00 AZT (UTC+4)	Wanderson 29'; Qarayev (yellow card) 44'; Ramon 64'; Santos (yellow card) 73'; Paro (yellow card) 90+4'	Report	Bogomolsky (yellow card) 20'; Ozobić 68'; Sheydayev (yellow card) 73'	Stadium: Dalga Arena; Attendance: 400; Referee: Rauf Cabarov

1 February 2025 21	Sumgayit	0–0	Araz-Naxçıvan	Sumgait
18:30 AZT (UTC+4)	Muradov (penalty missed) 10'; Badalov (yellow card) 47'; Abdullazade (yellow card) 69'; Alan (yellow card) 90'	Report	Wanderson (yellow card) 53'; Meza (yellow card) 69'; Ramon (yellow card) 69'; Ribeiro (yellow card) 89'	Stadium: City Stadium; Attendance: 900; Referee: Javid Jalilov

10 February 2025 22	Araz-Naxçıvan	0–0	Kapaz	Baku
16:00 AZT (UTC+4)	Qarayev (yellow card) 53'; Ahmadzada (yellow card) 77'	Report	A.Samadov (yellow card) 58'; Verdasca (yellow card) 68'; Ardazishvili (yellow card) 74'	Stadium: Dalga Arena; Attendance: 200; Referee: Kamal Umudlu

16 February 2025 23	Turan Tovuz	1–0	Araz-Naxçıvan	Tovuz
16:00 AZT (UTC+4)	Hurtado 86'; Konovalov (yellow card) 90+4'	Report	Ribeiro (red card) 47'	Stadium: City Stadium; Attendance: 4,100; Referee: Əliyar Ağayev

22 February 2025 24	Araz-Naxçıvan	0–0	Sabail	Baku
16:00 AZT (UTC+4)	Abbasov (yellow card) 18'; Nuno (yellow card) 27'; Wanderson (yellow card) 34'; Avram (yellow card) 63'	Report	Rustamov (yellow card) 4'	Stadium: Dalga Arena; Attendance: 70; Referee: Farid Hajiyev

4 March 2025 25	Sabah	2–2	Araz-Naxçıvan	Masazir
20:00 AZT (UTC+4)	Aliyev 7'; Seydiyev (yellow card) 22'; Rakhmonaliev (yellow card) 34'; Chakla 64'; Dashdamirov (yellow card) 78'	Report	Benny 11'; Wanderson (yellow card) 19'; Isgandarov (yellow card) 66' (goal) 72'; Ribeiro (yellow card) 90+3'	Stadium: Bank Respublika Arena; Attendance: 550; Referee: Rəvan Həmzəzadə

8 March 2025 26	Araz-Naxçıvan	1–3	Qarabağ	Baku
19:00 AZT (UTC+4)	Benny (yellow card) 24'; Santos 35' (red card) 83'; Hasanalizade (yellow card) 83'; Jatobá (yellow card) 83'	Report	Akhundzade 44'; L.Andrade 77'; Benzia (yellow card) 83'; Janković (yellow card) 83'; Qurbanlı (yellow card) 83'; Addai 90+6'	Stadium: Dalga Arena; Attendance: 300; Referee: Kamal Umudlu

14 March 2025 27	Araz-Naxçıvan	1–1	Shamakhi	Baku
19:00 AZT (UTC+4)	Benny 39'	Report	Hüseynov 68'; Konaté (yellow card) 76'; Fernandes (yellow card) 90+5'	Stadium: Dalga Arena; Attendance: 80; Referee: Rauf Jabarov

29 March 2025 28	Neftçi	1–1	Araz-Naxçıvan	Baku
15:45 AZT (UTC+4)	Sambou 3'; Kuč (yellow card) 5'; Matias (yellow card) 40'; Camalov (yellow card) 53'; Haghverdi (yellow card) 77'	Report	Paro 7'; Wanderson (yellow card) 22'; Abdullayev (yellow card) 82'; Ribeiro (yellow card) 90+3'	Stadium: Neftçi Arena; Attendance: 1,000; Referee: İnqilab Məmmədov

7 April 2025 29	Araz-Naxçıvan	2–0	Sumgayit	Baku
18:00 AZT (UTC+4)	Ramon 21' (pen.); Nimely 66' (o.g.)	Report	Suleymanli (yellow card) 9'; Milović (yellow card) 52'	Stadium: Dalga Arena; Attendance: 400; Referee: Javid Jalilov

13 April 2025 30	Kapaz	0–0	Araz-Naxçıvan	Tovuz
17:00 AZT (UTC+4)	Taghiyev (yellow card) 46'	Report	Ribeiro (yellow card) 50'	Stadium: City Stadium; Attendance: 350; Referee: Kamal Umudlu

18 April 2025 31	Araz-Naxçıvan	1–1	Turan Tovuz	Baku
19:00 AZT (UTC+4)	Paro 53'; Wanderson (yellow card) 67' (yellow-red card) 78'	Report	Hajiyev 34' (yellow card) 43'; Sadykhov (yellow card) 90+4'	Stadium: Dalga Arena; Attendance: 500; Referee: Əliyar Ağayev

27 April 2025 32	Sabail	1–1	Araz-Naxçıvan	Baku
17:30 AZT (UTC+4)	Lytvyn (yellow card) 34'; Allouch (yellow card) 60'; Nikolić 77' (yellow card) 84'; Muradov (yellow card) 90'	Report	Isgandarov 31'; Abbasov (yellow card) 44'; Ribeiro (yellow card) 83'	Stadium: Bayil Arena; Attendance: 150; Referee: Reshad Ahmedov

3 May 2025 33	Araz-Naxçıvan	1–1	Sabah	Baku
19:30 AZT (UTC+4)	Isgandarov 20'; Wanderson (yellow card) 36'; Jatobá (yellow card) 75'	Report	Thill 43'; Rakhmonaliev (yellow card) 80'; Mutallimov (yellow card) 90+1'	Stadium: Dalga Arena; Attendance: 250; Referee: Kamal Umudlu

11 May 2025 34	Qarabağ	2–0	Araz-Naxçıvan	Baku
20:00 AZT (UTC+4)	Vešović (yellow card) 29'; Qurbanlı 32'; Kashchuk (yellow card) 59'	Report	Ramon (yellow card) 5'; Ribeiro (yellow card) 18'; Wanderson (yellow card) 37'	Stadium: Azersun Arena; Attendance: 1,200; Referee: Əliyar Ağayev

17 May 2025 35	Shamakhi	0–1	Araz-Naxçıvan	Shamakhi
17:00 AZT (UTC+4)	Mickels (yellow card) 24'; Mammadov (yellow card) 67'; Rustamli (yellow card) 86'; Masimov (yellow card) 90+3'	Report	Nuno (yellow card) 10'; Abbasov (yellow card) 21'; Santos 44'; Meza (yellow card) 86'	Stadium: City Stadium; Attendance: 700; Referee: Ingilab Mammadov

25 May 2025 36	Araz-Naxçıvan	0–1	Zira	Baku
19:30 AZT (UTC+4)	Ribeiro (yellow card) 60'; Ağalarov (yellow card) 90+3'	Report	Alıyev (yellow card) 9'; Guima (yellow card) 33'; Júnior 58'	Stadium: Dalga Arena; Attendance: 200; Referee: Cavid Cəlilov

==== League table ====
Pos	Team	Pld	W	D	L	GF	GA	GD	Pts	Qualification or relegation
1	Qarabağ (C)	36	28	5	3	86	19	+67	89	Qualification for the Champions League second qualifying round (Note: Since already qualified Paris Saint-Germain won the Champions League, Qarabağ was promoted to the Champions League second qualifying round as one of the two champions with the highest coefficient in Champions League qualifying.)
2	Zira	36	23	5	8	59	27	+32	74	Qualification for the Conference League second qualifying round
3	Araz-Naxçıvan	36	15	13	8	34	29	+5	58	Qualification for the Conference League second qualifying round
4	Turan Tovuz	36	14	13	9	45	39	+6	55	
5	Sabah	36	10	18	8	50	46	+4	48	Qualification for the Europa League first qualifying round (Note: Sabah qualified for the Europa League first qualifying round as the 2024–25 Azerbaijan Cup winners.)

Source: Soccerway
Rules for classification: 1) Points; 2) Matches won; 3) Goal difference; 4) Goals scored; 5) Head-to-head points; 6) Head-to-head goal difference; 7) Lower number of points based on yellow and red cards; 8) Draw.
(C) Champions

=== Azerbaijan Cup ===
29 October 2024 Second round	Shahdag Qusar	0–4	Araz-Naxçıvan	Baku
16:00 AZT (UTC+4)	Amirguliyev (yellow card) 17'; R.Ağalarov (yellow card) 41'	Report	S.Ağalarov 16', 49'; Benny 45'; Mammadov 82'	Stadium: Dalga Arena; Attendance: 40; Referee: Ali Aliyev

3 December 2024 Last 16	Araz-Naxçıvan	3–1	Mingəçevir	Baku
16:00 AZT (UTC+4)	Isgandarov 5'; Benny 21'; Meza 66'	Report	Bayramov 80'	Stadium: Dalga Arena; Attendance: 30; Referee: Akbar Ahmadov

6 February 2025 Quarter-final 1st leg	Araz-Naxçıvan	1–0	Zira	Baku
16:00 AZT (UTC+4)	Abdullayev (yellow card) 51'; Benny 61' (pen.); Jatobá (yellow card) 86'	Report	Renato (yellow card) 75'; Júnior (yellow card) 81'; Alijanov (yellow card) 90+3'	Stadium: Dalga Arena; Attendance: 100; Referee: Elçin Məsiyev

28 February 2025 Quarter-final 2nd leg	Zira	0–2 (0–3 agg.)	Araz-Naxçıvan	Zirə
16:00 AZT (UTC+4)	Alıyev (yellow card) 35'; Isayev (yellow card) 44'; Soumah (yellow card) 56'; Papunashvili (yellow card) 90+3'	Report	Santos 3' (pen.), 45' (pen.); Paro (yellow card) 80'; Wanderson (yellow card) 90+3'	Stadium: Zira Olympic Sport Complex Stadium; Attendance: 200; Referee: İnqilab Məmmədov

2 April 2025 Semi-final 1st leg	Araz-Naxçıvan	1–0	Qarabağ	Baku
17:00 AZT (UTC+4)	Santos 28' (pen.); Wanderson (yellow card) 45+2'; Benny (yellow card) 58'; Abbasov (yellow card) 84'; Ribeiro (yellow card) 86'	Report	Vešović (yellow card) 36'; L.Andrade (yellow card) 76'; Kady (yellow card) 90+4'	Stadium: Dalga Arena; Attendance: 600; Referee: Elçin Məsiyev

23 April 2025 Semi-final 2nd leg	Qarabağ	3–0 (3–1 agg.)	Araz-Naxçıvan	Baku
17:00 AZT (UTC+4)	Benzia (yellow card) 43' (goal) 65'; Akhundzade 70'; Bayramov 77' (pen.)	Report	Santos (yellow card) 90+3'	Stadium: Tofiq Bahramov Republican Stadium; Attendance: 1,300; Referee: Ravan Hamzazade

== Squad statistics ==
As of match played 25 May 2025

=== Appearances and goals ===
No.	Pos	Nat	Player	Total		Premier League		Azerbaijan Cup	
No.	Pos	Nat	Player	Apps	Goals	Apps	Goals	Apps	Goals
1	GK	(Azerbaijan) AZE	Vusal Shabanov	1	0	0	0	0+1	0
2	DF	(Azerbaijan) AZE	Slavik Alxasov	35	0	21+9	0	3+2	0
3	DF	(Azerbaijan) AZE	Bekhtiyar Hasanalizade	21	1	20+1	1	0	0
4	DF	(Brazil) BRA	Igor Ribeiro	37	0	32+1	0	4	0
5	MF	(Azerbaijan) AZE	Qara Qarayev	24	0	19+2	0	3	0
6	MF	(Azerbaijan) AZE	Vadim Abdullayev	31	0	13+14	0	2+2	0
7	FW	(Azerbaijan) AZE	Ulvi Isgandarov	40	5	9+25	4	3+3	1
8	MF	(Brazil) BRA	Jatobá	17	0	6+7	0	2+2	0
9	MF	(Morocco) MAR	Ayyoub Allach	8	0	4+3	0	0+1	0
10	MF	(Portugal) POR	Benny	41	9	20+15	6	4+2	3
11	FW	(Azerbaijan) AZE	Bayramali Qurbanov	4	0	0+2	0	1+1	0
12	GK	(Moldova) MDA	Cristian Avram	38	0	34	0	4	0
14	FW	(Bosnia and Herzegovina) BIH	Mićo Kuzmanović	30	1	15+12	1	1+2	0
16	FW	(Brazil) BRA	Ramon	32	5	28	5	2+2	0
17	DF	(Burkina Faso) BFA	Issouf Paro	32	2	17+9	2	6	0
20	MF	(Azerbaijan) AZE	Turan Valizade	5	0	0+1	0	2+2	0
21	MF	(Paraguay) PAR	César Meza	19	1	3+14	0	2	1
22	DF	(Azerbaijan) AZE	Elçin Mustafayev	8	0	0+5	0	2+1	0
23	FW	(Portugal) POR	Nuno Rodrigues	41	1	27+8	1	5+1	0
24	MF	(Azerbaijan) AZE	Mustafa Ahmadzada	19	0	8+7	0	3+1	0
26	DF	(Azerbaijan) AZE	Omar Buludov	25	1	20+2	1	3	0
29	MF	(Brazil) BRA	Wanderson	35	1	32	1	2+1	0
34	DF	(Azerbaijan) AZE	Urfan Abbasov	39	1	33+1	1	5	0
57	MF	(Azerbaijan) AZE	Elcan Mammadov	2	1	0	0	0+2	1
71	FW	(Azerbaijan) AZE	Senan Ağalarov	4	2	0+2	0	2	2
88	MF	(Azerbaijan) AZE	Tuhay Alizade	1	0	0	0	0+1	0
94	GK	(Azerbaijan) AZE	Tarlan Ahmadli	4	0	2	0	2	0
97	FW	(Brazil) BRA	Felipe Santos	36	13	32+1	10	3	3
Players away on loan:
Players who left Araz-Naxçıvan during the season:

=== Goal scorers ===
Place	Position	Nation	Number	Name	Premier League	Azerbaijan Cup	Total
1	FW	(Brazil)	97	Felipe Santos	10	3	13
2	MF	(Portugal)	10	Benny	6	3	9
3	FW	(Brazil)	16	Ramon	5	0	5
3	FW	(Azerbaijan)	7	Ulvi Isgandarov	4	1	5
5	DF	(Burkina Faso)	17	Issouf Paro	2	0	2
5	FW	(Azerbaijan)	71	Senan Ağalarov	0	2	2
7	FW	(Portugal)	23	Nuno Rodrigues	1	0	1
7	DF	(Azerbaijan)	26	Omar Buludov	1	0	1
7	FW	(Bosnia and Herzegovina)	14	Mićo Kuzmanović	1	0	1
7	DF	(Azerbaijan)	3	Bekhtiyar Hasanalizade	1	0	1
7	DF	(Azerbaijan)	34	Ürfan Abbasov	1	0	1
7	MF	(Brazil)	29	Wanderson	1	0	1
7	MF	(Azerbaijan)	57	Elcan Mammadov	0	1	0
7	MF	(Paraguay)	21	César Meza	0	1	0
7				Own goal	1	0	1
				TOTALS	34	11	45

=== Clean sheets ===
Place	Position	Nation	Number	Name	Premier League	Azerbaijan Cup	Total
1	GK	(Moldova)	12	Cristian Avram	15	3	18
2	GK	(Azerbaijan)	94	Tarlan Ahmadli	0	1	1
				TOTALS	15	4	19

=== Disciplinary record ===
Number	Nation	Position	Name	Premier League		Azerbaijan Cup		Total	
Number	Nation	Position	Name	Booked	Sent off (straight red)	Booked	Sent off (straight red)	Booked	Sent off (straight red)
2	(Azerbaijan)	DF	Slavik Alxasov	1	0	0	0	1	0
3	(Azerbaijan)	DF	Bekhtiyar Hasanalizade	2	0	0	0	2	0
4	(Brazil)	DF	Igor Ribeiro	9	1	1	0	10	1
5	(Azerbaijan)	MF	Qara Qarayev	3	0	0	0	3	0
6	(Azerbaijan)	MF	Vadim Abdullayev	3	0	1	0	4	0
7	(Azerbaijan)	FW	Ulvi Isgandarov	3	0	0	0	3	0
8	(Brazil)	MF	Jatobá	2	0	1	0	3	0
10	(Portugal)	MF	Benny	2	0	1	0	3	0
12	(Moldova)	GK	Cristian Avram	3	0	0	0	3	0
14	(Bosnia and Herzegovina)	FW	Mićo Kuzmanović	1	0	0	0	1	0
16	(Brazil)	FW	Ramon Machado	4	0	0	0	4	0
17	(Burkina Faso)	DF	Issouf Paro	1	0	1	0	2	0
20	(Azerbaijan)	MF	Turan Valizade	2	1	0	0	2	1
21	(Paraguay)	MF	César Meza Colli	2	0	0	0	2	0
22	(Azerbaijan)	DF	Elchin Mustafayev	1	0	0	0	1	0
23	(Portugal)	FW	Nuno Rodrigues	6	0	0	0	6	0
24	(Azerbaijan)	MF	Mustafa Ahmadzada	2	0	0	0	2	0
26	(Azerbaijan)	DF	Omar Buludov	6	0	0	0	6	0
29	(Brazil)	MF	Wanderson Maranhão	13	1	2	0	15	1
34	(Azerbaijan)	DF	Ürfan Abbasov	5	0	1	0	6	0
71	(Azerbaijan)	FW	Senan Ağalarov	1	0	0	0	1	0
94	(Azerbaijan)	GK	Tarlan Ahmadli	1	0	0	0	1	0
95	(Montenegro)	DF	Miloš Milović	1	0	0	0	1	0
97	(Brazil)	FW	Felipe Santos	7	1	1	0	8	1
Players away on loan:
Players who left Araz-Naxçıvan during the season:
			TOTALS	81	4	9	0	90	4
