= Ba-Muaka Simakala =

German footballer (born 1997)

Personal information
- Date of birth: 28 January 1997 (age 29)
- Place of birth: Eschweiler, Germany
- Height: 1.80 m (5 ft 11 in)
- Position: Forward

Team information
- Current team: KAS Eupen
- Number: 11

Youth career
- VfB Aachen
- –2011: Alemannia Aachen
- 2011–2016: Borussia Mönchengladbach

Senior career*
Years	Team	Apps	(Gls)
2016–2018	Borussia Mönchengladbach II	51	(14)
2017–2018	Borussia Mönchengladbach	1	(0)
2018–2020	Roda JC	40	(1)
2020	SV Elversberg	3	(0)
2020–2021	SV Rödinghausen	38	(14)
2021–2023	VfL Osnabrück	68	(27)
2023–2024	Holstein Kiel	11	(0)
2024	→ 1. FC Kaiserslautern (loan)	7	(1)
2024–2025	VfL Osnabrück	23	(8)
2025–2026	Araz-Naxçıvan	31	(9)
2026–present	KAS Eupen	0	(0)

International career
2014	Germany U18	1	(0)
- * Club domestic league appearances and goals as of 31 May 2026

Ba-Muaka Simakala (born 28 January 1997) is a German professional footballer who plays as a forward at Belgian club KAS Eupen.

== Career ==
In May 2023, following VfL Osnabrück's promotion to the 2. Bundesliga, it was announced that Simakala would join Holstein Kiel, also playing in the 2. Bundesliga, on a free transfer.

On 2 January 2024, Simakala moved on loan to 1. FC Kaiserslautern.

On 8 August 2024, Simakala returned to VfL Osnabrück.

On 17 June 2025, Azerbaijan Premier League club Araz-Naxçıvan announced the signing of Simakala from VfL Osnabrück to a one-year contract. He moved to Belgian second-division side KAS Eupen in July 2026.

== Personal life ==
Born in Germany, Simakala is of Congolese descent.

== Career statistics ==
As of match played on 6 June 2023

Appearances and goals by club, season and competition
Club	Season	League			National cup		Other		Total	
Club	Season	Division	Apps	Goals	Apps	Goals	Apps	Goals	Apps	Goals
Borussia Mönchengladbach II	2015–16	Regionalliga West	1	0	—		—		1	0
Borussia Mönchengladbach II	2016–17	Regionalliga West	19	4	—		—		19	4
Borussia Mönchengladbach II	2017–18	Regionalliga West	29	9	—		—		29	9
Borussia Mönchengladbach II	2018–19	Regionalliga West	2	1	—		—		2	1
Borussia Mönchengladbach II	Total		51	14	0	0	0	0	51	14
Borussia Mönchengladbach	2016–17	Bundesliga	1	0	0	0	—		1	0
Roda JC Kerkrade	2018–19	Eerste Divisie	27	0	2	2	—		29	2
Roda JC Kerkrade	2019–20	Eerste Divisie	13	1	1	1	—		14	2
Roda JC Kerkrade	Total		40	1	3	3	0	0	43	4
SV Elversberg	2019–20	Regionalliga Südwest	3	0	0	0	—		3	0
SV Rödinghausen	2019–20	Regionalliga West	0	0	0	0	1 (Note: Appearance in the 2019–20 Westphalian DFB-Pokal play-off)	0	1	0
SV Rödinghausen	2020–21	Regionalliga West	38	14	0	0	—		38	14
SV Rödinghausen	Total		38	14	0	0	1	0	39	14
VfL Osnabrück	2021–22	3. Liga	31	8	2	0	—		33	8
VfL Osnabrück	2022–23	3. Liga	37	19	0	0	1 (Note: Appearance in the Lower Saxony Cup)	1	38	20
VfL Osnabrück	Total		68	27	2	0	1	1	71	28
Career total			201	56	3	3	2	1	206	60
