= Ramon Machado =

Brazilian footballer

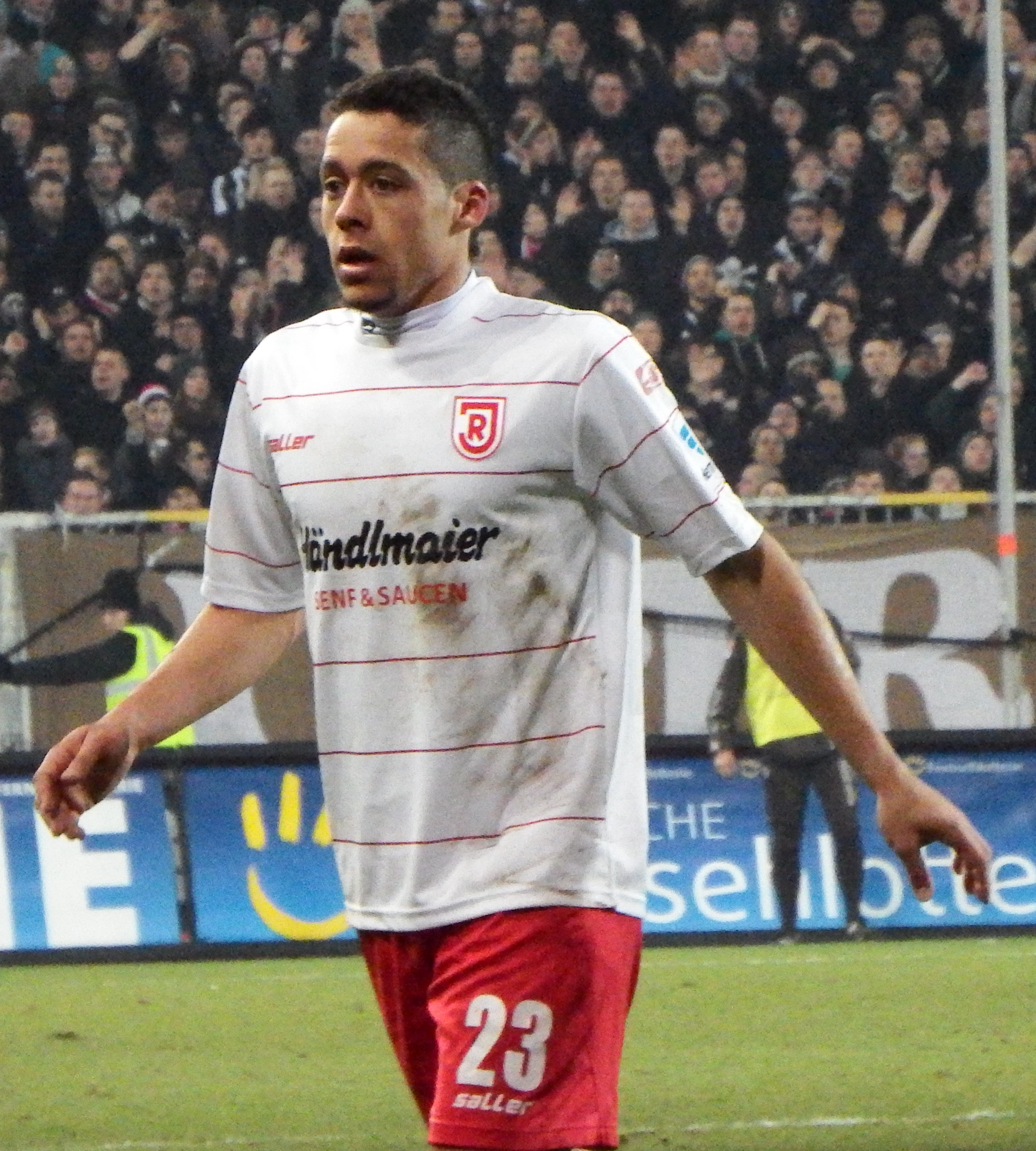
- Ramon Machado with Jahn Regensburg in 2013

Personal information
- Full name: Ramon Machado de Macedo
- Date of birth: 4 April 1991 (age 35)
- Place of birth: Carbonita, Brazil
- Height: 1.80 m (5 ft 11 in)
- Position: Striker

Team information
- Current team: Araz-Naxçıvan
- Number: 16

Youth career
- Grêmio
- Atlético Paranaense
- Paraná

Senior career*
Years	Team	Apps	(Gls)
2012–2013	Jahn Regensburg	25	(2)
2014	Esportivo	6	(2)
2014	Lajeadense	0	(0)
2014	Santa Cruz RS	0	(0)
2015	Boa Esporte	4	(0)
2015	Lajeadense	30	(14)
2016–2017	Brasil de Pelotas	49	(12)
2017	Ponte Preta	5	(0)
2017	Juventude	29	(4)
2018	Vila Nova	26	(6)
2019	Ituano	8	(2)
2019	Paraná	16	(1)
2020	Santo André	8	(1)
2020	Botafogo-PB	18	(6)
2021	Santo André	13	(2)
2021	Brasil de Pelotas	18	(1)
2021–2022	Neftçi	24	(5)
2022–2023	Gabala	32	(8)
2023–2024	Sabah	14	(10)
2024–	Araz-Naxçıvan	50	(10)
- * Club domestic league appearances and goals as of 22 June 2026

Ramon Machado de Macedo (born 4 April 1991) is a Brazilian professional footballer who plays as a striker for Araz-Naxçıvan PFK in the Azerbaijan Premier League.

== Career ==
Following their relegation at the end of the 2012–13 2. Bundesliga season, Ramon Machado was released by Jahn Regensburg.

On 1 September 2021, Ramon Machado signed a one-year contract with Neftçi, with Neftçi confirming his departure on 27 June 2022. On 30 July 2022, fellow Azerbaijan Premier League club Gabala announced the signing of Ramon on a one-year contract.

== Career statistics ==
As of match played 3 June 2023

Appearances and goals by club, season and competition
Club	Season	League			State League		National cup (Note: Includes DFB Pokal, Copa do Brasil, Azerbaijan Cup and Malaysia FA Cup)		Continental		Other		Total	
Club	Season	Division	Apps	Goals	Apps	Goals	Apps	Goals	Apps	Goals	Apps	Goals	Apps	Goals
Jahn Regensburg	2012-13	2. Bundesliga	25	2	—		0	0	—		—		25	2
Esportivo	2014	—			6 (Note: Appearance(s) in Campeonato Gaúcho)	2	—		—		—		6	2
Lajeadense	2014	—			0	0	1	0	—		0	0	1	0
Boa Esporte	2015	Série B	4	0	0	0	0	0	—		—		4	0
Lajeadense	2015	Série D	12	8	16	6	2	0	—		0	0	30	14
Brasil de Pelotas	2016	Série B	35	9	12	3	2	0	—		—		49	12
Ponte Preta	2017	Série A	0	0	3 (Note: Appearance(s) in Campeonato Paulista)	0	2	0	0	0	—		5	0
Juventude	2017	Série B	29	4	0	0	0	0	—		—		29	4
Vila Nova	2018	Série B	12	1	10 (Note: Appearance(s) in Campeonato Goiano)	4	4	1	—		—		26	6
Ituano	2019	Série D	0	0	9	2	—		—		—		9	2
Paraná	2019	Série B	16	1	0	0	0	0	—		—		16	1
Santo André	2020	—			7	1	1	0	—		—		8	1
Botafogo-PB	2020	Série C	16	4	0	0	0	0	—		2 (Note: Appearance(s) in Copa do Nordeste)	2	18	6
Santo André	2021	Série D	0	0	13	2	—		—		—		13	2
Brasil de Pelotas	2021	Série B	18	1	0	0	—		—		—		18	1
Neftçi	2021-22	Azerbaijan Premier League	24	5	—		4	2	0	0	—		28	7
Gabala	2022-23	Azerbaijan Premier League	32	8	—		5	2	0	0	—		37	10
Sabah	2023	Malaysia Super League	11	9	—		0	0	7 (Note: Appearance(s) in AFC Champions League Two)	2	—		18	11
Sabah	2024-25	Malaysia Super League	3	1	—		3	3	0	0	—		6	4
Sabah	Total		14	10	—		3	3	7	2	0	0	24	15
Araz-Naxçıvan	2024-25	Azerbaijan Premier League	20	4	—		2	0	—		—		22	4
Career total			257	57	76	20	26	8	7	2	2	2	368	89
