= Wanderson Maranhão =

Brazilian footballer (born 1994)

Personal information
- Full name: Wanderson Cavalcante Melo
- Date of birth: 26 July 1994 (age 32)
- Place of birth: João Lisboa, Brazil
- Height: 1.80 m (5 ft 11 in)
- Position: Midfielder

Team information
- Current team: Araz-Naxçıvan
- Number: 29

Youth career
- 2011–2012: Figueirense
- 2012–2013: JV Lideral
- 2013–2015: Coritiba

Senior career*
Years	Team	Apps	(Gls)
2014–2016	Coritiba	0	(0)
2015	→ Foz do Iguaçu (loan)	7	(0)
2016	→ Maringá (loan)	8	(0)
2017	XV de Piracicaba	10	(0)
2017	Eskilstuna	9	(0)
2018–2021	Vitebsk	103	(6)
2022–2023	Chornomorets Odesa	0	(0)
2022–2023	→ Panevėžys (loan)	34	(6)
2023–	Araz-Naxçıvan	65	(2)
- * Club domestic league appearances and goals as of 27 June 2025

Wanderson Cavalcante Melo (born 26 July 1994), known as Wanderson Maranhão, is a Brazilian professional footballer who plays for Araz-Naxçıvan in the Azerbaijan Premier League.
