= Slavik Alxasov =

Azerbaijani footballer (born 1993)

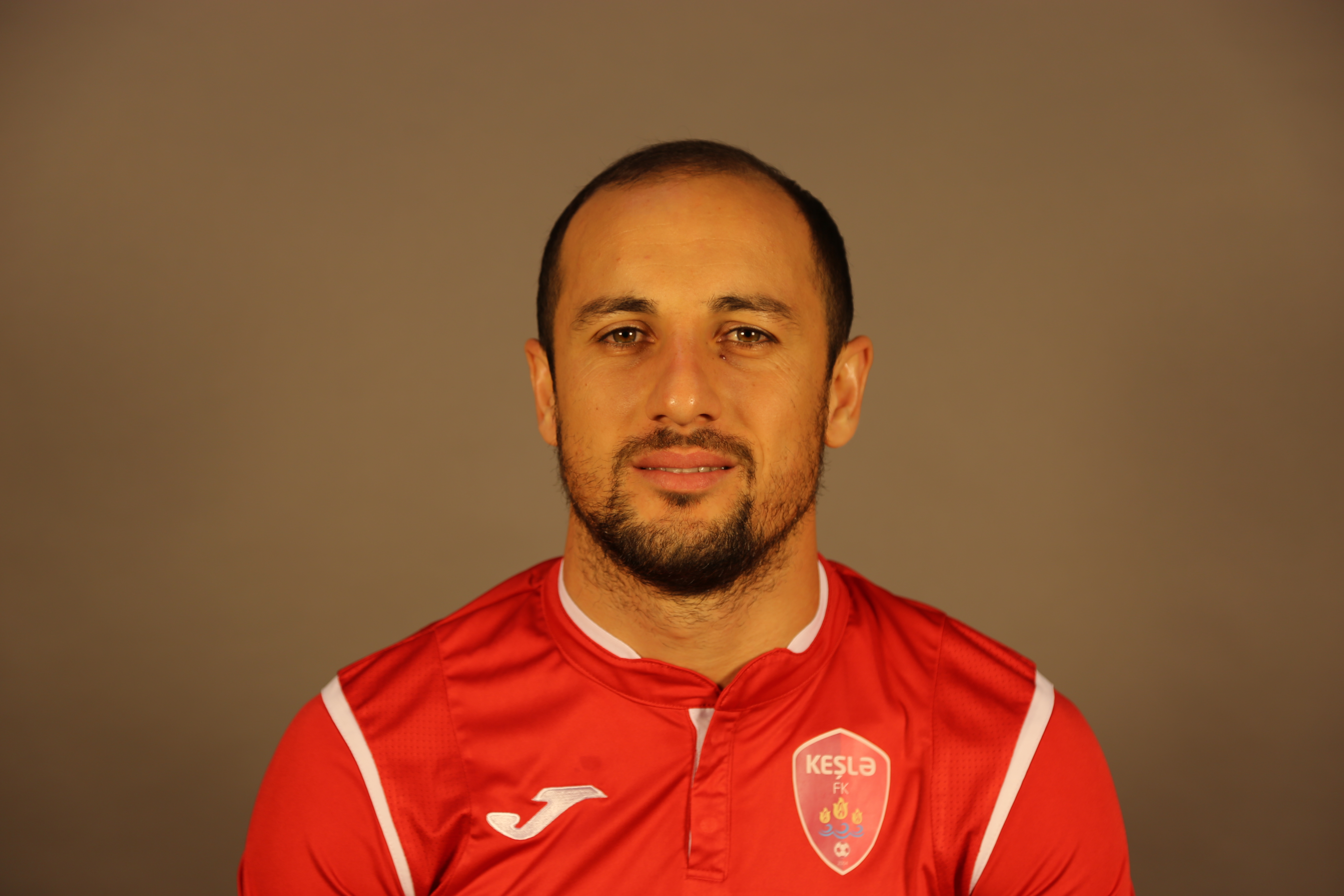

Personal information
- Full name: Slavik Həsrət oğlu Alxasov
- Date of birth: 6 February 1993 (age 33)
- Place of birth: Qusar, Azerbaijan
- Height: 1.74 m (5 ft 8 1/2 in)
- Position: Left-back

Team information
- Current team: Araz-Naxçıvan
- Number: 5

Senior career*
Years	Team	Apps	(Gls)
2011–2013	Neftçi Baku	0	(0)
2011–2013	→ Sumgayit (loan)	63	(1)
2014	Khazar Lankaran	10	(0)
2014–2016	Sumgayit	65	(3)
2016–2020	Keşla	92	(10)
2020–2022	Sabah	34	(2)
2022–2023	Zira	20	(0)
2023–2024	Turan Tovuz	7	(0)
2024–	Araz-Naxçıvan	54	(2)

International career^{‡}
2013	Azerbaijan U21	4	(0)
- * Club domestic league appearances and goals as of 22 June 2026 ‡ National team caps and goals as of 4 May 2023

Slavik Həsrət oğlu Alxasov (born on 6 February 1993) is an Azerbaijani footballer who plays as a defender for Araz-Naxçıvan in the Azerbaijan Premier League.

== Club career ==
Alxasov made his debut in the Azerbaijan Premier League for Sumgayit on 6 August 2011, match against Khazar Lankaran.

On 25 June 2020, Alxasov signed a 2+1 years contract with Sabah FC.

== Honours ==
Keşla

- Azerbaijan Cup (1): 2017–18
