= Bernardo Dias =

Portuguese footballer

Personal information
- Full name: Bernardo Oliveira Dias
- Date of birth: 4 January 1997 (age 29)
- Place of birth: Lisbon, Portugal
- Height: 1.77 m (5 ft 10 in)
- Position: Midfielder

Team information
- Current team: Ararat-Armenia
- Number: 70

Youth career
- 2007–2008: Oficinas São José
- 2008–2010: Benfica
- 2010–2014: Oeiras
- 2014–2016: Belenenses

Senior career*
Years	Team	Apps	(Gls)
2016–2018	Belenenses	25	(2)
2018–2020	B-SAD	4	(0)
2018–2019	→ Benfica B (loan)	29	(2)
2020–2021	Chaves	35	(1)
2021–2023	Doxa	61	(6)
2023–2024	Torreense	26	(6)
2024–2025	Araz-Naxçıvan	35	(6)
2025–2026	Petro Atlético	24	(7)
2026–	Ararat-Armenia	9	(1)
- * Club domestic league appearances and goals as of 14:48, 5 November 2026 (UTC)

Bernardo Oliveira Dias (born 4 January 1997), also known as Benny, is a Portuguese professional footballer who plays as a midfielder for Armenian Premier League club Ararat-Armenia.

== Club career ==
Born in Lisbon, Dias joined C.F. Os Belenenses' youth system in 2014, aged 17. On 14 August 2016 he made his Primeira Liga debut, starting and playing 56 minutes in a 2–0 away loss against Vitória de Setúbal.

Dias scored his first league goal on 24 September 2017, coming on as a second-half substitute and closing the 4–1 away win over C.D. Feirense. His second arrived the following 9 January, in a 1–1 home draw with Boavista FC. The previous November, he had renewed his contract until 2022 with a €15 million buyout clause.

On 6 July 2018, Dias was loaned from B-SAD to S.L. Benfica B for one season. His maiden appearance in the LigaPro took place on 11 August, when he started in the 2–1 home defeat of Leixões SC. His first goal arrived on 27 October, helping the hosts beat S.C. Covilhã 3–2.

Dias signed with G.D. Chaves still in the second tier in January 2020. He scored his only goal for the club on 23 September of that year, in a 4–3 victory at Benfica B.

On 14 July 2021, Dias agreed to a deal at Doxa Katokopias FC in the Cypriot First Division. He returned to Portugal and its second division in summer 2023, on a contract at S.C.U. Torreense.

Dias went back abroad subsequently, having spells at Azerbaijan's Araz-Naxçıvan PFK and Angola's Atlético Petróleos de Luanda. With the latter, he participated in the 2025–26 CAF Champions League.

Ahead of the 2026–27 season, joined Armenian Premier League side FC Ararat-Armenia.

== Honours ==
Petro Atlético

- Girabola: 2025–26
- Supertaça de Angola: 2025
