= VfB Aachen =

German football club

VfB 08 Aachen
- Full name: Verein für Bewegungsspiele; 1908 Aachen e.V.
- Founded: 1908
- Ground: Leo-Vermeeren-Stadion
- Capacity: 500
- Manager: Marc Schweden
- League: Kreisliga C1 Aachen (X)
- 2015–16: 10th
Home colours	Away colours

VfB 08 Aachen is a German association football club from the city of Aachen, North Rhine-Westphalia.

== History ==
The team has its origins in the establishment in 1908 of FC Minerva and FC Rhenania. Minerva soon merged with another local side to become FC Colombia. The memberships of many clubs were decimated by World War I and following the conflict Colombia and Rhenania merged to form present day side Verein für Bewegungsspiele 1908 Aachen. Today VfB is a multi sport club. The handball section established in 1920 was a dominant regional side through the late 1920s and into the early 1930s.

VfB enjoyed its greatest success playing top flight football in the regional Westdeutscher (West German) circuit in the 1920s. The club's last appearance there was in the 1931–32 season. Following World War II the team was part of the third tier Amateurliga Mittlerhein between 1949 and 1955 where their best finish was a 5th-place result in 1953–54. Their last match of any national significance was a Westdeutscher Pokal (West German Cup) match against rival Alemannia Aachen in 1952, which they lost 0:5.

Since 2015 the club has been part of the local Kreisliga C (X).
