= Cristian Avram =

Moldovan footballer (born 1994)

Personal information
- Date of birth: 27 July 1994 (age 32)
- Place of birth: Chișinău, Moldova
- Height: 1.91 m (6 ft 3 in)
- Position: Goalkeeper

Team information
- Current team: Vllaznia
- Number: 12

Senior career*
Years	Team	Apps	(Gls)
2012–2017	Academia Chișinău	94	(0)
2017	Dacia Chișinău	7	(0)
2018–2019	Dinamo-Auto Tiraspol	34	(0)
2019–2023	Petrocub Hîncești	56	(0)
2021–2022	→ Buzău (loan)	3	(0)
2023–2026	Araz-Naxçıvan	91	(0)
2026	Petrocub Hîncești	3	(0)
2026–	Vllaznia	0	(0)

International career^{‡}
2012–2013	Moldova U17	1	(0)
2013–2015	Moldova U21	9	(0)
2021–	Moldova	16	(0)
- * Club domestic league appearances and goals as of 22 August 2026 ‡ National team caps and goals as of 9 October 2025

Cristian Avram (born 27 July 1994) is a Moldovan professional footballer who plays as a goalkeeper for Kategoria Superiore club Vllaznia and the Moldova national team

== International career ==
At international level, Avram played for the under-17 and under-21 teams of Moldova.

He made his debut for the Moldova national team on 6 June 2021 in a friendly against Azerbaijan.

== Career statistics ==
=== International ===
As of match played 9 October 2025

Appearances and goals by national team and year
National team	Year	Apps	Goals
Moldova	2021	6	0
Moldova	2022	2	0
Moldova	2023	–	
Moldova	2024	3	0
Moldova	2025	5	0
Total		16	0
