= Elçin Mustafayev =

Azerbaijani footballer (born 2000)

Personal information
- Full name: Elçin Elfaq oğlu Mustafayev
- Date of birth: 5 July 2000 (age 26)
- Place of birth: Sumgait, Azerbaijan
- Height: 1.77 m (5 ft 10 in)
- Position: Right-back

Team information
- Current team: Araz-Naxçıvan
- Number: 22

Senior career*
| Years | Team | Apps | (Gls) |
| 2018–2022 | Sabah | 0 | (0) |
| 2021–2022 | → Shamakhi (loan) | 13 | (0) |
| 2022–2023 | Shamakhi | 30 | (0) |
| 2023– | Araz-Naxçıvan | 22 | (0) |

International career
| 2021–2022 | Azerbaijan U21 | 2 | (0) |
- * Club domestic league appearances and goals as of 27 June 2025

Elçin Elfaq oğlu Mustafayev (born 5 July 2000) is an Azerbaijani footballer who plays as a right-back for Araz-Naxçıvan in the Azerbaijan Premier League.

== Club career ==
On 22 January 2021, Mustafayev made his debut in the Azerbaijan Premier League for Shamakhi FK match against Sumgayit.
