= Nuno Rodrigues (footballer, born 1994) =

Portuguese footballer

Personal information
- Full name: Nuno Miguel Santos Rodrigues
- Date of birth: 30 November 1994 (age 31)
- Place of birth: Tábua, Portugal
- Height: 1.82 m (6 ft 0 in)
- Positions: Winger; attacking midfielder

Team information
- Current team: Voluntari
- Number: 22

Youth career
- 2006–2009: Tourizense
- 2009–2013: Académica

Senior career*
Years	Team	Apps	(Gls)
2013–2016	Oliveira do Hospital	88	(14)
2016–2017	Pedras Salgadas	32	(4)
2017–2018	Gafanha	28	(2)
2018–2019	Lusitano Vildemoinhos	34	(7)
2019–2020	Mafra	23	(3)
2020–2021	Arouca	12	(0)
2021–2022	Vilafranquense	32	(3)
2022–2023	Covilhã	31	(1)
2023–2026	Araz-Naxçıvan	98	(2)
2026–	Voluntari	5	(0)
- * Club domestic league appearances and goals as of 2 November 2026

Nuno Miguel Santos Rodrigues (born 30 November 1994) is a Portuguese professional footballer who plays as a winger or an attacking midfielder for Liga I club Voluntari.

== Career ==
He made his Taça da Liga debut for Mafra on 28 July 2019 in a game against Oliveirense.

== Honours ==
Oliveira do Hospital

- Divisão Honra: 2013–14
