= Jatobá (footballer, born 1995) =

Brazilian footballer

Carlos Jatobá
Personal information
- Full name: Carlos Eduardo Bacila Jatobá
- Date of birth: 15 September 1995 (age 31)
- Place of birth: Curitiba, Brazil
- Height: 1.83 m (6 ft 0 in)
- Position: Midfielder

Team information
- Current team: Port

Youth career
- –2015: Figueirense

Senior career*
Years	Team	Apps	(Gls)
2015–2016	Figueirense	0	(0)
2016–2017	J. Malucelli	9	(0)
2016–2017	→ Londrina (loan)	1	(0)
2017–2018	Dunav Ruse	10	(0)
2018–2022	Sporting CP B	0	(0)
2019	→ Atlético Goianiense (loan)	0	(0)
2019	→ Brasil de Pelotas (loan)	27	(1)
2020–2021	→ CRB (loan)	35	(2)
2022	→ Santo André (loan)	0	(0)
2022–2023	São Bento	0	(0)
2023	Londrina	11	(1)
2023–2024	Politehnica Iași	34	(1)
2024–2025	Araz-Naxçıvan	14	(0)
2025–2026	Daegu	8	(0)
2026–	Port	0	(0)
- * Club domestic league appearances and goals as of 8 November 2025

Carlos Eduardo Bacila Jatobá (born 15 September 1995) is a Brazilian professional footballer who plays as a midfielder for South Korean Thai League 1 club Port.

== Career ==
Jatobá started his career with Figueirense, but did not play for them. He represented J. Malucelli in 2016 Campeonato Brasileiro Série D and at the end of that campaign secured a loan move to Londrina where he played a single game in 2016 Campeonato Brasileiro Série B.

In September 2017, he signed with Bulgarian First League side Dunav Ruse on a two-year deal.

On 15 June 2018, Jatobá signed for five years with Portuguese club Sporting for an undisclosed fee. He returned to Brazil on loan to Atlético Goianiense at the start of the 2019 season, and signed a further loan deal with Brasil de Pelotas in April 2019.

In January 2020, Carlos Jatobá signed for 1-year deal with CRB.

== Personal life ==
Jatobá is the son of former Brazilian defender Carlos Roberto Jatobá.

== Honours ==
CRB

- Campeonato Alagoano: 2020
