= Bekhtiyar Hasanalizade =

Azerbaijani footballer (born 1992)

Bəxtiyar Həsənalızadə
Personal information
- Full name: Bəxtiyar Bəyqulu oğlu Həsənalızadə
- Date of birth: 29 December 1992 (age 33)
- Place of birth: Baku, Azerbaijan
- Height: 1.87 m (6 ft 1 1/2 in)
- Position: Defender

Team information
- Current team: Araz-Naxçıvan
- Number: 3

Senior career*
Years	Team	Apps	(Gls)
2010–2018	Sumgayit	160	(4)
2019–2020	Zira	23	(0)
2020–2023	Sabah	45	(2)
2023–2024	Tuzlaspor	20	(1)
2024–	Araz-Naxçıvan	45	(3)

International career^{‡}
2014	Azerbaijan U21	2	(0)
2023–	Azerbaijan	4	(0)
- * Club domestic league appearances and goals as of 22 June 2026 ‡ National team caps and goals as of 13 October 2023

Bəxtiyar Bəyqulu oğlu Həsənalızadə (born 29 December 1992) is an Azerbaijani footballer who plays as a defender for Araz-Naxçıvan and the Azerbaijan national team.

== Club career ==
Həsənalızadə made his debut in the Azerbaijan Premier League for Sumgayit on 18 March 2012, match against Kapaz.

On 24 December 2020, Həsənalızadə signed for Sabah FC until the end of the 2020–21 season.
