= Charles Boli =

Scottish footballer (born 1998)

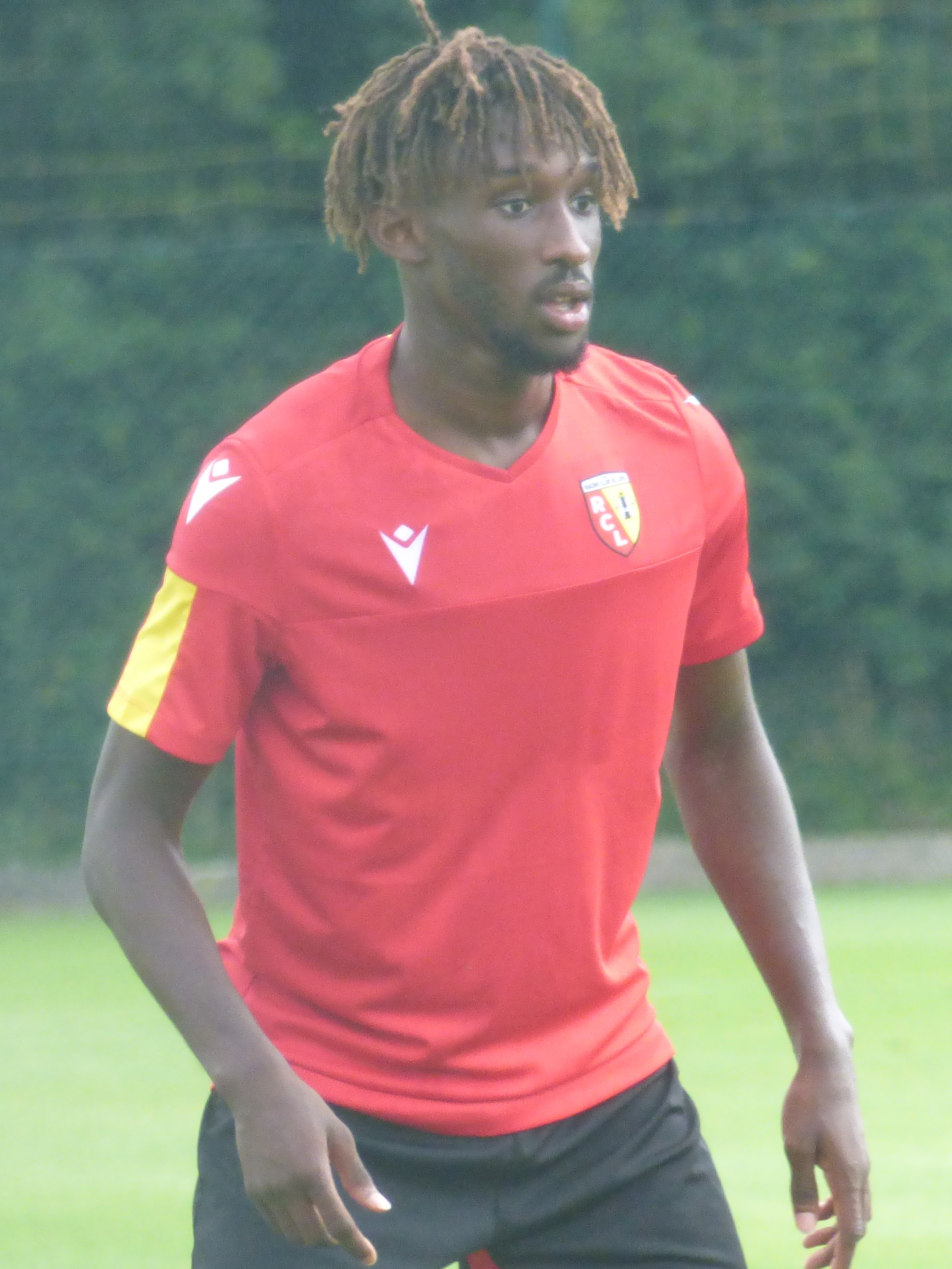
- Boli in 2019

Personal information
- Date of birth: 30 August 1998 (age 28)
- Place of birth: Dundee, Scotland
- Height: 1.75 m (5 ft 9 in)
- Position: Midfielder

Team information
- Current team: Araz-Naxçıvan
- Number: 70

Youth career
- 2005–2009: Avion
- 2009–2019: Lens

Senior career*
Years	Team	Apps	(Gls)
2017–2022	Lens II	53	(10)
2019–2022	Lens	14	(0)
2021	→ Paris FC (loan)	11	(2)
2021–2022	→ Vicenza (loan)	12	(0)
2022–2024	Pau	54	(4)
2024–2025	Apollon Limassol	21	(1)
2025–	Araz-Naxçıvan	30	(5)
- * Club domestic league appearances and goals as of 22 June 2026

Charles Boli (born 30 August 1998) is a Scottish professional footballer who plays as a midfielder for Azerbaijan Premier League club Araz-Naxçıvan.

== Career ==
On 16 May 2019, Boli signed his first professional contract with Lens. He made his professional first match for Lens in a 2–1 Coupe de la Ligue win over Troyes on 13 August 2019. He signed a new four-year contract with Lens in January 2020. He moved on loan to Paris FC in January 2021. On 7 January 2022, he moved on loan to Vicenza in the Italian Serie B.

Boli joined Ligue 2 side Pau on a two-year contract in August 2022.

== Personal life ==
Boli is the son of the Ivorian former footballer Roger Boli, nephew of French international footballer Basile Boli, and cousin of Ivorian footballer Yannick Boli. Boli's brothers, Kévin and Yohan Boli, are also professional footballers, who have represented Ivory Coast internationally.

Boli was born in Dundee, while his father played for Dundee United.

== Career statistics ==
=== Club ===
As of 10 August 2024

Appearances and goals by club, season and competition
Club	Season	League			National cup		League cup		Europe		Other		Total	
Club	Season	Division	Apps	Goals	Apps	Goals	Apps	Goals	Apps	Goals	Apps	Goals	Apps	Goals
Lens	2018–19	Ligue 2	0	0	1	0	0	0	—		—		1	0
Lens	2019–20	Ligue 2	10	0	1	0	3	0	—		—		14	0
Lens	2021–22	Ligue 1	4	0	0	0	—		—		—		4	0
Lens	Total		14	0	2	0	3	0	—		—		19	0
Paris FC (loan)	2020–21	Ligue 2	11	2	2	0	—		—		—		13	2
Vicenza (loan)	2021–22	Serie B	12	0	—		—		—		—		12	0
Pau	2022–23	Ligue 2	28	1	4	0	—		—		—		32	1
Pau	2023–24	Ligue 2	26	3	3	0	—		—		—		29	3
Pau	Total		54	4	7	0	—		—		—		61	4
Career total			91	6	11	0	3	0	0	0	0	0	105	6
