= Felipe Santos (footballer) =

Beninese footballer (born 1997)

Personal information
- Full name: Felipe Silva Correa dos Santos
- Date of birth: 3 January 1997 (age 29)
- Place of birth: São Paulo, Brazil
- Height: 1.79 m (5 ft 10 in)
- Position: Winger

Team information
- Current team: Bangkok United
- Number: 97

Youth career
- Palmeiras

Senior career*
Years	Team	Apps	(Gls)
2014–2016	Paulista	30	(6)
2018	Ankaran	15	(3)
2018–2021	Maribor	50	(5)
2021–2022	Keşla FK	23	(7)
2022–2023	Gabala	38	(4)
2023–2024	Hapoel Haifa	29	(1)
2024–2026	Araz-Naxçıvan	60	(17)
2026–	Bangkok United	0	(0)

International career
2026–	Benin	2	(0)
- * Club domestic league appearances and goals as of 22 June 2026

Felipe Silva Correa dos Santos (born 3 January 1997), commonly known as Felipe Santos, is a professional footballer who plays as a winger for Thai League 1 club Bangkok United. Born in Brazil, he declared his intention to play senior international football for Benin national team in December 2025.

== Career ==
On 1 July 2021, Keşla FK announced the signing of Santos.

=== International ===
In November 2025, Santos acquired Beninese citizenship through his ancestry with a view to representing Benin at international level.

On 3 December 2025, Santos was named in Benin's 30 player-provisional squad for the 2025 Africa Cup of Nations.

== Career statistics ==
=== Club ===
As of match played 3 June 2023

Appearances and goals by club, season and competition
Club	Season	League			National cup (Note: Includes Copa do Brasil, Slovenian Cup and Azerbaijan Cup)		League cup		Continental		Other		Total	
Club	Season	Division	Apps	Goals	Apps	Goals	Apps	Goals	Apps	Goals	Apps	Goals	Apps	Goals
Paulista	2014	Campeonato Paulista	3	0	4	0	—		—		—		7	0
Paulista	2015	Campeonato Paulista Série A2	14	4	0	0	—		—		—		14	4
Paulista	2016	Campeonato Paulista Série A2	9	2	0	0	—		—		—		9	2
Paulista	Total		26	6	4	0	0	0	0	0	0	0	30	6
Ankaran	2017–18	Slovenian PrvaLiga	15	3	0	0	—		—		—		15	3
Maribor	2018–19	Slovenian PrvaLiga	15	2	2	1	—		0	0	—		17	3
Maribor	2019–20	Slovenian PrvaLiga	12	1	0	0	—		0	0	—		12	1
Maribor	2020–21	Slovenian PrvaLiga	19	1	2	0	—		0	0	—		21	1
Maribor	Total		46	4	4	1	0	0	0	0	0	0	50	5
Shamakhi	2021–22	Azerbaijan Premier League	21	6	2	0	—		2 (Note: Appearance(s) in UEFA Europa Conference League)	1	—		25	7
Gabala	2022–23	Azerbaijan Premier League	35	3	6	2	—		2	1	—		43	6
Hapoel Haifa	2023–24	Israeli Premier League	0	0	0	0	—		—		—		0	0
Career total			143	22	16	3	0	0	4	2	0	0	163	27

=== International ===
Scores and results list Benin's goal tally first.

No.	Date	Venue	Opponent	Score	Result	Competition
1.	9 June 2026	El Bachir Stadium, Mohammedia, Morocco	Togo	1–0	1–5	Friendly
