= Omar Buludov =

Azerbaijani footballer (born 1998)

Personal information
- Full name: Omar Fuad oglu Buludov
- Date of birth: 15 December 1998 (age 27)
- Place of birth: Agstafa, Azerbaijan
- Height: 1.76 m (5 ft 9 in)
- Position: Defender

Team information
- Current team: Araz-Naxçıvan
- Number: 26

Senior career*
Years	Team	Apps	(Gls)
2016–2024	Neftçi Baku	111	(5)
2024–	Araz-Naxçıvan	42	(1)

International career^{‡}
2016	Azerbaijan U19	1	(0)
2018–	Azerbaijan U21	10	(0)
2019–	Azerbaijan	1	(0)
- * Club domestic league appearances and goals as of 22 June 2026 ‡ National team caps and goals as of 19:52, 9 October 2019 (UTC)

Omar Fuad oglu Buludov (Azerbaijani: Ömər Fuad oğlu Buludov; born 15 December 1998) is an Azerbaijani footballer who plays as a defender for Araz-Naxçıvan and the Azerbaijan national team.

== Career ==
Buludov represented Azerbaijan internationally with the under-19 team in 2016 and under-21 team in 2018. He made his international debut for the senior Azerbaijan team on 9 October 2019 in a friendly match against Bahrain, which finished as a 3–2 away win.

== Career statistics ==
=== International ===
As of 9 October 2019

Azerbaijan
Year	Apps	Goals
2019	1	0
Total	1	0
