= Dalga Arena =

Stadium in Azerbaijan

Coordinates: 40°30′39″N 50°10′7″E

Liv Bona Dea Arena
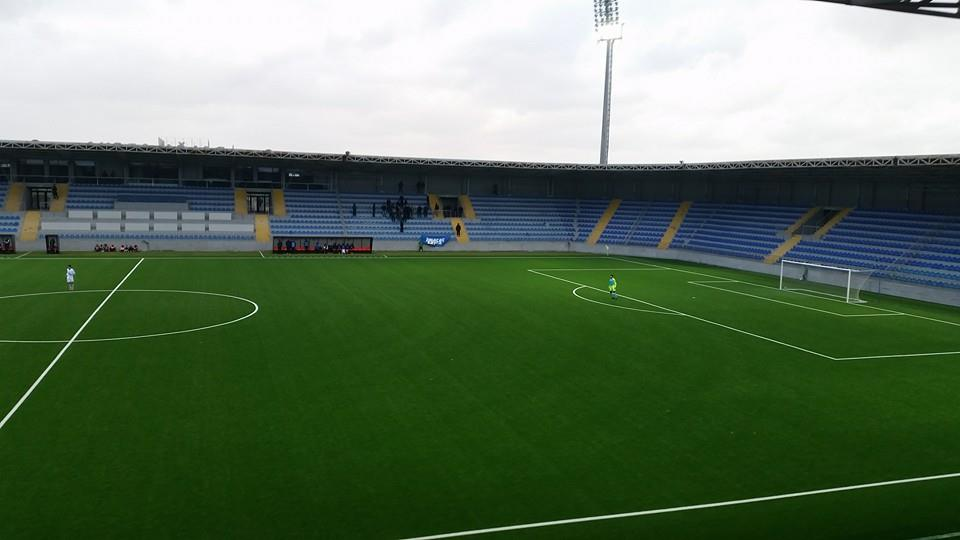
- View of the stadium
- Interactive map of Liv Bona Dea Arena
- Location: Mardakan, Azerbaijan
- Owner: AFFA
- Capacity: 6,502
- Surface: Grass

Construction
- Built: June 6, 2011

Tenant
- Azerbaijan National Football Team

Dalga Arena (Azerbaijani: Dalğa Arena) also known as Liv Bona Dea Arena for sponsorship reasons, is a multi-use stadium in the Mardakan settlement of Baku, Azerbaijan. It is currently used mostly for football matches. The stadium holds 6,500 people and was opened by Sepp Blatter and Michel Platini on 6 June 2011.

The stadium was one of the venues during the 2012 FIFA U-17 Women's World Cup.

Clubs that qualified for the Europe League, home matches were held in the "Dalga Arena" stadium.

Liv Bona Dea Arena already hosted two matches of the Azerbaijan national team against North Macedonia in a friendly and Austria in the UEFA Euro 2012 qualifying.

== Azerbaijan national football team matches ==
The following national team matches were held in the stadium.

Date	Time (CEST)	Team #1	Res.	Team #2	Round	Attendance
7 October 2011	21:00	Azerbaijan	1–4	Austria	UEFA Euro 2012 qualifying	6,000
17 June 2023	18:00	Azerbaijan	1–1	Estonia	UEFA Euro 2024 qualifying	3,000
9 September 2023	15:00	Azerbaijan	0–1	Belgium	UEFA Euro 2024 qualifying	4,500

== See also ==
- List of football stadiums in Azerbaijan
