= 2014–15 Araz-Naxçıvan PFK season =

Araz-Naxçıvan
2014-15 season
- President: Orkhan Jabbarov
- Manager: Asgar Abdullayev
- Stadium: Nakchivan City Stadium
- Premier League: 10th Withdrew; 17 November 2014
- Top goalscorer: League: David Janalidze (3); All: David Janalidze (3)
- Highest home attendance: 7,500 vs Neftchi Baku; 10 August 2014)
- Lowest home attendance: 4,100 vs AZAL; 18 October 2014)
- Average home league attendance: 5,825; 17 November 2014)
Home colours

The Araz-Naxçıvan 2014–15 season was to be Araz-Naxçıvan's second Azerbaijan Premier League season, and first since the 2000–01 season. However they failed to complete the season after withdrawing from the league after 10 rounds, on 17 November 2014, with all their contracted players becoming free agents.

== Squad ==
As of 17 November 2014

Note: Flags indicate national team as defined under FIFA eligibility rules; some limited exceptions apply. Players may hold more than one non-FIFA nationality.

No.	Pos.	Nation	Player
1	GK	AZE	Elchin Sadigov
2	DF	AZE	Tural Hümbätov
3	MF	AZE	Alimirza Dashzarini
4	DF	AZE	Emin Jafarguliyev
5	MF	AZE	Javid Hasanov
6	MF	AZE	Budaq Nəsirov
7	MF	AZE	Ramal Huseynov
8	MF	AZE	Elmin Chobanov (captain)
9	MF	AZE	Garib Ibrahimov
10	MF	AZE	Eshgin Guliyev
11	MF	UKR	Sergei Silyuk
13	DF	AZE	Agil Nabiyev
14	DF	AZE	Elhad Naziri
15	FW	AZE	Ruslan Nasirli

No.	Pos.	Nation	Player
16	MF	AZE	Kamil Hüseynov
17	FW	AZE	Bakhtiyar Soltanov
18	MF	AZE	Elgiz Kärämli
19	MF	AZE	Tarlan Khalilov
20	DF	UKR	Ruslan Zubkov
21	MF	GEO	David Janalidze
24	MF	AZE	Azer Mammadov
25	DF	UKR	Aleksandr Krutskevich
44	DF	AZE	Saşa Yunisoğlu
85	GK	AZE	Kamal Bayramov
91	MF	AZE	Kamil Nurähmädov
—	MF	AZE	Akif Taghiyev
—	MF	AZE	Əziz Hüseynov
—	MF	UKR	Ruslan Zeynalov

== Transfers ==
=== Summer ===
In: Note: Flags indicate national team as defined under FIFA eligibility rules; some limited exceptions apply. Players may hold more than one non-FIFA nationality.

No.	Pos.	Nation	Player
4	DF	AZE	Emin Jafarguliyev (from (Azerbaijan) AZAL)
6	MF	AZE	Budaq Nəsirov
7	MF	AZE	Ramal Huseynov
9	MF	AZE	Garib Ibrahimov (from (Azerbaijan) AZAL)
11	FW	AZE	Vugar Asgarov
11	MF	UKR	Sergei Silyuk
13	DF	AZE	Agil Nabiyev (from (Azerbaijan) Ravan Baku)
14	DF	AZE	Elhad Naziri (from (Azerbaijan) Inter Baku)
15	FW	AZE	Ruslan Nasirli (from (Azerbaijan) Sumgayit)
23	GK	AZE	Elchin Sadigov (from (Azerbaijan) AZAL)
44	DF	AZE	Saşa Yunisoğlu (from (Turkey) Denizlispor)
85	GK	AZE	Kamal Bayramov (from (Azerbaijan) Ravan Baku)
91	MF	AZE	Kamil Nurähmädov (from (Azerbaijan) Ravan Baku)
—	MF	AZE	Kamil Hüseynov
—	MF	UKR	Ruslan Zeynalov (from (Ukraine) Oleksandriya)

Out: Note: Flags indicate national team as defined under FIFA eligibility rules; some limited exceptions apply. Players may hold more than one non-FIFA nationality.

No.	Pos.	Nation	Player
1	GK	AZE	Emil Balayev (loan return to (Azerbaijan) Neftchi Baku)
4	DF	AZE	Farman Ganbarov (to (Azerbaijan) Ravan Baku)
6	DF	AZE	Mikayil Rahimov
9	MF	AZE	Irfan Yuseinov
11	FW	AZE	Farid Guliyev (to (Azerbaijan) Sumgayit)
11	FW	AZE	Vugar Asgarov (to (Azerbaijan) Zira)
16	MF	AZE	Vugar Ahmadov
18	FW	AZE	Ibrahim Aliyev
25	MF	AZE	Elgiz Karimli

== Competitions ==
=== Azerbaijan Premier League ===
==== Results summary ====
Overall								Home						Away					
Pld	W	D	L	GF	GA	GD	Pts	W	D	L	GF	GA	GD	W	D	L	GF	GA	GD
10	1	1	8	5	18	−13	4	1	1	2	4	4	0	0	0	6	1	14	−13

Last updated: 4 November 2014.
Source: Soccerway

==== Results by round ====
Round	1	2	3	4	5	6	7	8	9	10
Ground	H	A	A	H	A	A	H	A	H	A
Result	W	L	L	L	L	L	D	L	L	L
Position	2	3	8	9	9	10	10	10	10	10

Source: Soccerway
A = Away; H = Home; W = Win; D = Draw; L = Loss

==== Results ====
10 August 2014 1	Araz-Naxçıvan	3 – 0	Neftchi Baku	Nakhchivan
18:00 AZST (UTC+5)	D.Janalidze 52', 90+4'; E.Chobanov (yellow card) 62' (goal) 81'; A.Mammadov (yellow card) 72'; B.Nəsirov (yellow card) 85'	Summary	E.Abdullayev (yellow card) 30'; E.Mehdiyev (yellow card) 42'; Denis (yellow card) 49'	Stadium: Nakhchivan City Stadium; Attendance: 7,500; Referee: Fariz Yusifov

17 August 2014 2	Gabala	1 – 0	Araz-Naxçıvan	Qabala
20:00 AZST (UTC+5)	Huseynov 16' (pen.); Yazalde (yellow card) 55'; Ropotan (yellow card) 58'	Summary	Huseynov (yellow card) 26'; Zubkov (yellow card) 36'	Stadium: Gabala City Stadium; Attendance: 2,000; Referee: Rahim Häsänov

24 August 2014 3	Araz-Naxçıvan	Postponed	Qarabağ	Nakhchivan
18:00 AZST (UTC+5)		Summary		Stadium: Nakhchivan City Stadium

30 August 2014 4	Sumgayit	1 – 0	Araz-Naxçıvan	Sumqayit
20:00 AZST (UTC+5)	Hüseynov (yellow card) 11' (yellow-red card) 52'; Soltanpour 22'; T.Jahangirov (yellow card) 61'; S.Mahammadaliyev (yellow card) 90'	Summary	T.Khalilov (yellow card) 64'; D.Janalidze (yellow card) 75'; B.Soltanov (yellow card) 87'; K.Bayramov (yellow card) 90+3'	Stadium: Kapital Bank Arena; Attendance: 1,500; Referee: O.Paşayev

12 September 2014 5	Araz-Naxçıvan	1 – 3	Inter Baku	Nakhchivan
17:30 AZST (UTC+5)	Zubkov 81'	Summary	Tskhadadze 48'; J.Diniyev (yellow card) 56' (goal) 61'; Lomaia (yellow card) 57'; A.Mammadov 86'	Stadium: Nakhchivan City Stadium; Attendance: 7,100; Referee: Elvin Äsgärov

20 September 2014 6	Khazar Lankaran	2 – 0	Araz-Naxçıvan	Lankaran
19:00 AZST (UTC+5)	Ramaldanov (yellow card) 36'; Ivanov 74' (yellow card) 87'; A.Ramazanov 88'	Summary	Zubkov (yellow card) 45'; T.Hümbätov (yellow card) 50'; Yunisoğlu (yellow card) 50'	Stadium: Lankaran City Stadium; Attendance: 6,500; Referee: Ramil Diniyev

27 September 2014 7	Baku	2 – 1	Araz-Naxçıvan	Baku
16:00 AZST (UTC+5)	T.Gurbatov 28'; E.Huseynov (yellow card) 47'; N.Gurbanov 77' (yellow card) 90'	Summary	E.Chobanov 50'; B.Nəsirov (yellow card) 71'; Huseynov (yellow card) 90+1'	Stadium: Tofiq Bahramov Stadium; Attendance: 500; Referee: Ingilab Mämmädov

18 October 2014 8	Araz-Naxçıvan	2 – 2	AZAL	Nakhchivan
15:00 AZST (UTC+5)	Zubkov (yellow card) 12'; T.Hümbätov (yellow card) 23'; Nabiyev (yellow card) 33'; D.Janalidze (yellow card) 42' (goal) 44'; B.Soltanov 62'	Summary	Abdullayev (yellow card) 13' (goal) 23' (pen.); Mombongo-Dues (yellow card) 28'; Eduardo 49'; Ramos 57'	Stadium: Nakhchivan City Stadium; Attendance: 4,100; Referee: Fariz Yusifov

25 October 2014 9	Simurq	4 – 0	Araz-Naxçıvan	Zaqatala
18:00 AZST (UTC+5)	Ćeran (yellow card) 8'; Stanojević 34'; R.Eyyubov 47', 56', 90+3'; Lambot (yellow card) 59'	Summary	T.Hümbätov (yellow card) 4'; K.Hüseynov (yellow card) 44'	Stadium: Zaqatala City Stadium; Attendance: 1,500; Referee: Aliyar Ağayev

29 October 2014 10	Araz-Naxçıvan	0 – 1	Gabala	Nakhchivan
14:00 AZT (UTC+4)	Huseynov (yellow card) 19'; T.Khalilov (yellow card) 65'; Nabiyev (yellow card) 69'	Summary	Farkaš 21'; Ropotan (yellow card) 51'; R.Tagizade (yellow card) 64'; Ehiosun (yellow card) 82'	Stadium: Nakhchivan City Stadium; Attendance: 4,600; Referee: Elvin Äsgärov

2 November 2014 11	Qarabağ	4 – 0	Araz-Naxçıvan	Baku
19:30 AZT (UTC+4)	Muarem 15'; Emeghara 34'; Reynaldo 50', 62' (pen.); S.Aliyev (yellow card) 52'; Gurbanov (yellow card) 59'	Summary	A.Dashzarini (yellow card) 32'; J.Hasanov (yellow card) 89'	Stadium: Tofiq Bahramov Stadium^{1} Attendance: 250; Referee: Vusal Äliyev

==== League table ====
Pos	Team	Pld	W	D	L	GF	GA	GD	Pts	Qualification
1	Qarabağ (C)	32	20	8	4	51	28	+23	68	Qualification for Champions League second qualifying round
2	Inter Baku	32	17	12	3	55	20	+35	63	Qualification for Europa League first qualifying round
3	Gabala	32	15	9	8	46	35	+11	54	Qualification for Europa League first qualifying round
4	Neftchi Baku	32	13	10	9	38	33	+5	49	Qualification for Europa League first qualifying round
5	Simurq	32	11	6	15	41	39	+2	39	
6	AZAL	32	10	9	13	37	42	−5	39	
7	Khazar Lankaran	32	8	8	16	35	46	−11	32	
8	Sumgayit	32	7	10	15	32	43	−11	31	
9	Baku	32	3	8	21	19	68	−49	17	Relegation to the Azerbaijan First Division
10	Araz-Naxçıvan (Note: Araz-Naxçıvan were officially withdrawn from the league on 17 November 2014)	0	0	0	0	0	0	0	0	Team withdrawn

Source: uefa.com
Rules for classification: 1) points; 2) head-to-head points; 3) head-to-head goal difference; 4) head-to-head goals scored; 5. head-to-head away goals (only if 2 teams are tied); 6) goal difference; 7) goals scored.
(C) Champions

=== Azerbaijan Cup ===
3 December 2014 Second Round	Khazar Lankaran	Walkover^{2}	Araz-Naxçıvan	Lankaran
18:00 AZT (UTC+4)		[ Summary]		Stadium: Lankaran City Stadium

== Squad statistics ==
As of Match played 2 November 2014

=== Appearances and goals ===
No.	Pos	Nat	Player	Total		Premier League		Azerbaijan Cup	
No.	Pos	Nat	Player	Apps	Goals	Apps	Goals	Apps	Goals
2	DF	(Azerbaijan) AZE	Tural Hümbätov	4	0	4	0	0	0
3	MF	(Azerbaijan) AZE	Alimirza Dashzarini	4	0	3+1	0	0	0
4	DF	(Azerbaijan) AZE	Emin Jafarguliyev	9	0	8+1	0	0	0
5	MF	(Azerbaijan) AZE	Javid Hasanov	5	0	1+4	0	0	0
6	MF	(Azerbaijan) AZE	Budaq Nəsirov	6	0	5+1	0	0	0
7	MF	(Azerbaijan) AZE	Ramal Huseynov	9	0	9	0	0	0
8	MF	(Azerbaijan) AZE	Elmin Chobanov	8	2	6+2	2	0	0
9	MF	(Azerbaijan) AZE	Garib Ibrahimov	5	0	2+3	0	0	0
10	MF	(Azerbaijan) AZE	Eshgin Guliyev	7	0	6+1	0	0	0
11	MF	(Ukraine) UKR	Sergei Silyuk	3	0	3	0	0	0
13	DF	(Azerbaijan) AZE	Agil Nabiyev	6	0	6	0	0	0
15	FW	(Azerbaijan) AZE	Ruslan Nasirli	4	0	0+4	0	0	0
16	MF	(Azerbaijan) AZE	Kamil Hüseynov	3	0	3	0	0	0
17	FW	(Azerbaijan) AZE	Bakhtiyar Soltanov	10	1	10	1	0	0
18	MF	(Azerbaijan) AZE	Elgiz Kärämli	1	0	1	0	0	0
19	MF	(Azerbaijan) AZE	Tarlan Khalilov	7	0	6+1	0	0	0
20	DF	(Ukraine) UKR	Ruslan Zubkov	8	1	8	1	0	0
21	MF	(Georgia (country)) GEO	David Janalidze	10	3	8+2	3	0	0
22	MF	(Azerbaijan) AZE	Eshgin Guliyev	1	0	1	0	0	0
23	FW	(Azerbaijan) AZE	Elnur Abdulov	3	0	0+3	0	0	0
24	MF	(Azerbaijan) AZE	Azer Mammadov	6	0	5+1	0	0	0
25	DF	(Ukraine) UKR	Aleksandr Krutskevich	4	0	4	0	0	0
44	DF	(Azerbaijan) AZE	Saşa Yunisoğlu	3	0	3	0	0	0
85	GK	(Azerbaijan) AZE	Kamal Bayramov	10	0	10	0	0	0
91	MF	(Azerbaijan) AZE	Kamil Nurähmädov	3	0	2+1	0	0	0
Players who appeared for Araz-Naxçıvan no longer at the club:
11	FW	(Azerbaijan) AZE	Vugar Asgarov	2	0	0+2	0	0	0

=== Goal scorers ===
Place	Position	Nation	Number	Name	Premier League	Azerbaijan Cup	Total
1	MF	(Georgia (country))	21	David Janalidze	3	0	3
2	MF	(Azerbaijan)	8	Elmin Chobanov	2	0	2
3	DF	(Ukraine)	20	Ruslan Zubkov	1	0	1
3	FW	(Azerbaijan)	17	Bakhtiyar Soltanov	1	0	1
				TOTALS	7	0	7

=== Disciplinary record ===
Number	Nation	Position	Name	Premier League		Azerbaijan Cup		Total	
Number	Nation	Position	Name	Yellow card	Red card	Yellow card	Red card	Yellow card	Red card
2	(Azerbaijan)	DF	Tural Hümbätov	3	0	0	0	3	0
3	(Azerbaijan)	MF	Alimirza Dashzarini	1	0	0	0	1	0
5	(Azerbaijan)	MF	Javid Hasanov	1	0	0	0	1	0
6	(Azerbaijan)	MF	Budaq Nəsirov	2	0	0	0	2	0
7	(Azerbaijan)	MF	Ramal Huseynov	3	0	0	0	3	0
8	(Azerbaijan)	MF	Elmin Chobanov	1	0	0	0	1	0
13	(Azerbaijan)	DF	Agil Nabiyev	2	0	0	0	2	0
16	(Azerbaijan)	MF	Kamil Hüseynov	1	0	0	0	1	0
17	(Azerbaijan)	FW	Bakhtiyar Soltanov	1	0	0	0	1	0
19	(Azerbaijan)	DF	Tarlan Khalilov	2	0	0	0	2	0
20	(Ukraine)	DF	Ruslan Zubkov	3	0	0	0	3	0
21	(Georgia (country))	MF	David Janalidze	2	0	0	0	2	0
24	(Azerbaijan)	MF	Azer Mammadov	1	0	0	0	1	0
44	(Azerbaijan)	DF	Saşa Yunisoğlu	1	0	0	0	1	0
85	(Azerbaijan)	GK	Kamal Bayramov	1	0	0	0	1	0
			TOTALS	25	0	0	0	25	0

== Notes ==
- Qarabağ have played their home games at the Tofiq Bahramov Stadium since 1993 due to the ongoing situation in Quzanlı.
- Following Araz-Naxçıvan's withdrawal from the Azerbaijan Premier League, Khazar Lankaran were awarded the victory.
