= Issouf Paro =

Burkinabé footballer (born 1994)

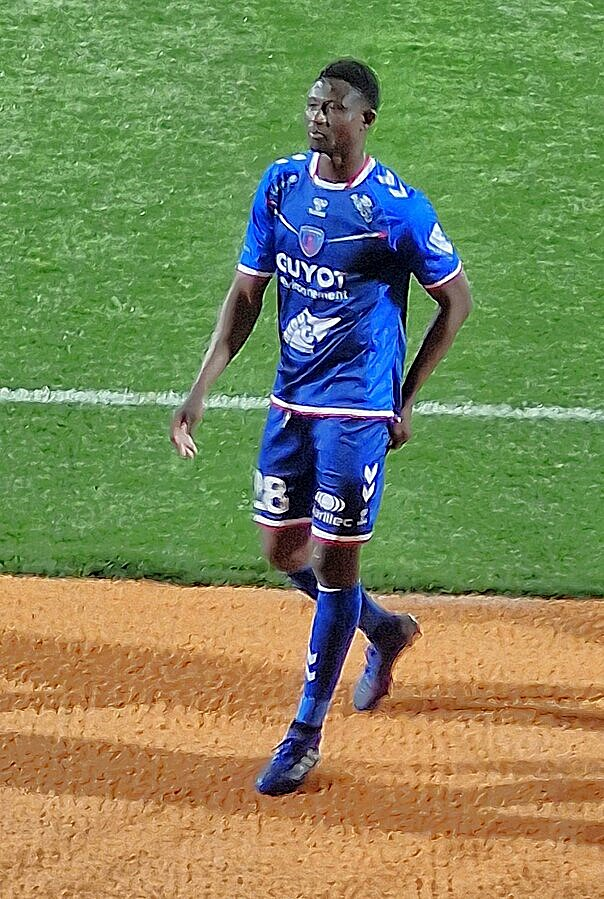
- Paro in 2024

Personal information
- Date of birth: 16 October 1994 (age 32)
- Place of birth: Bobo-Dioulasso, Burkina Faso
- Height: 1.81 m (5 ft 11 in)
- Position: Centre-back

Team information
- Current team: Araz-Naxçıvan
- Number: 17

Senior career*
Years	Team	Apps	(Gls)
2014–2015	Étoile Filante		
2015–2017	Santos	46	(0)
2017–2021	Niort	66	(0)
2017–2020	Niort II	9	(1)
2022–2024	Concarneau	28	(2)
2024–	Araz-Naxçıvan	48	(4)

International career^{‡}
2015–2019	Burkina Faso	9	(0)
Medal record
Representing Burkina Faso
Africa Cup of Nations
Third place	2017 Gabon
- * Club domestic league appearances and goals as of 22 June 2026 ‡ National team caps and goals as of 20:22, 22 June 2026 (UTC)

Issouf Paro (born 16 October 1994) is a Burkinabé international footballer who plays as a centre-back for Azerbaijani Premier League club Araz-Naxçıvan PFK. He previously played in his homeland for Étoile Filante and in South Africa with Santos.

== Club career ==
Born in Bobo-Dioulasso, Paro has played for Étoile Filante, Santos, Niort and Niort II.

On 21 June 2022, Paro joined Concarneau on an initial one-season deal.

On 3 September 2024, the Azerbaijan Premier League club Araz-Naxçıvan signed a one-year contract with Paro.

== International career ==
Paro made his international debut in 2015, and was named in the squad for the 2017 Africa Cup of Nations.
