= Ulvi Isgandarov =

Azerbaijani footballer (born 1997)

Personal information
- Full name: Ulvi Humbat oglu Isgandarov
- Date of birth: 24 October 1997 (age 29)
- Place of birth: Azerbaijan
- Height: 1.76 m (5 ft 9 in)
- Position: Striker

Team information
- Current team: Araz-Naxçıvan
- Number: 7

Youth career
- Gabala

Senior career*
Years	Team	Apps	(Gls)
2017–2024	Gabala	118	(17)
2018–2019	→ Sumgayit (loan)	18	(3)
2024–	Araz-Naxçıvan	57	(5)

International career^{‡}
2018	Azerbaijan U21	3	(1)
- * Club domestic league appearances and goals as of 22 June 2026 ‡ National team caps and goals as of 22 September 2020

Ulvi Isgandarov (Azerbaijani: Ülvi İsgəndərov; born on 24 October 1997) is an Azerbaijani professional footballer who plays as a striker for Araz-Naxçıvan in the Azerbaijan Premier League.

== Career ==
=== Club ===
On 10 February 2018, Isgandarov made his debut in the Azerbaijan Premier League for Sumgayit match against Zira.

On 29 May 2024, Araz-Naxçıvan announced the signing of Isgandarov to a one-year contract for the 2024–25 season.

== Career statistics ==
=== Club ===
As of match played 9 March 2024

Appearances and goals by club, season and competition
Club	Season	League			National Cup		Continental		Other		Total	
Club	Season	Division	Apps	Goals	Apps	Goals	Apps	Goals	Apps	Goals	Apps	Goals
Gabala	2016–17	Azerbaijan Premier League	0	0	0	0	0 (Note: Appearances in the UEFA Europa League)	0	-		0	0
Gabala	2017–18	Azerbaijan Premier League	0	0	1	1	0	0	-		1	1
Gabala	2018–19	Azerbaijan Premier League	0	0	0	0	0	0	-		0	0
Gabala	2019–20	Azerbaijan Premier League	18	3	1	1	2	0	-		21	4
Gabala	2020–21	Azerbaijan Premier League	18	1	1	0	-		-		19	1
Gabala	2021–22	Azerbaijan Premier League	28	6	5	1	-		-		33	7
Gabala	2022–23	Azerbaijan Premier League	33	6	5	1	2 (Note: Appearances in the UEFA Europa Conference League)	0	-		40	7
Gabala	2023–24	Azerbaijan Premier League	21	1	3	0	2	0	-		26	1
Gabala	Total		118	17	16	4	6	0	-	-	140	21
Sumgayit (loan)	2017–18	Azerbaijan Premier League	6	0	0	0	-		-		6	0
Sumgayit (loan)	2018–19	Azerbaijan Premier League	12	3	2	2	-		-		14	5
Sumgayit (loan)	Total		18	3	2	2	-	-	-	-	20	5
Career total			136	20	18	6	6	0	-	-	160	26
