= Araz-Naxçıvan PFK =

Araz-Naxçıvan
- Full name: Araz-Naxçıvan Peşəkar Futbol Klubu
- Nickname: Qırmızı qurdlar (The Red Wolves)
- Founded: 1967; 59 years ago
- Ground: Nakhchivan City Stadium
- Capacity: 12,800
- Chairman: Ceyhun Sultanov
- Manager: Yuriy Maksymov
- League: Azerbaijan Premier League
- 2025–26: Azerbaijan Premier League, 6th of 12
- Website: anpfc.az
Home colours	Away colours

Araz-Naxçıvan PFK (Azerbaijani: Araz-Naxçıvan Peşəkar Futbol Klubu) is an Azerbaijani professional football club based in Nakchivan.

The club played in the Azerbaijan Premier League again in 2014–15 after being promoted at the end of the 2013–14 season. The club played in the Azerbaijan First Division from the 2022 to 2023 season. In 2023, Araz Nakhcivan was the champion of the Azerbaijan First Division, and promoted to the Azerbaijani Premier League.

== History ==
The club was created in 1967, and as of 1968, it participated in the Soviet First League. The club stopped its activity after the collapse of the Soviet Union. In 2001, the team was formed again and took part in the Azerbaijan Premier League. However year later, because of financial difficulties, the team once more ceased to exist.

The club was re-established on 23 May 2013 and immediately joined the Azerbaijan First Division. In its first season, Araz sent Simurq crashing out of the Azerbaijan Cup. In May 2014, the club earned promotion to Azerbaijan Premier League after winning the division in the same season. In September 2014, Araz became linked to a match fixing scandal, the result of which saw the key players leaving the club and Nakhchivan Autonomous Republic government officials intervening.

On 3 November 2014, Araz-Naxçıvan announced their withdrawal from the league due to constant biased referee decisions, with the officially announcing their withdrawal on 17 November 2014. The club competed in the Azerbaijan First Division. In 2023, Araz Nakhcivan was champion of the Azerbaijan First Division and promoted to the Azerbaijani Premier League 2023–2024.

== Stadium ==
Araz's home ground was Nakhchivan City Stadium, which has a capacity of 12,000. For the stadium's first game, the announced attendance was 4,000.

== League and domestic cup history ==
Season	Div.	Pos.	Pl.	W	D	L	GS	GA	P	Domestic Cup	Top Goalscorer
2000–01	1st	10	20	3	3	14	14	55	12	1/8 final	İlham Allahyarov (6)
2013–14	2nd	1	30	25	4	1	66	11	79	1/4 final	David Janalidze (24)
2014–15	1st	Withdrew								Withdrew	David Janalidze (3)
2023–24	1st	8	36	9	9	18	31	50	36	1/4 final	Orkhan Aliyev (9)
2024–25	1st	3	36	15	13	8	34	29	58	1/2 final	Felipe Santos (10)
2025–26	1st	6	33	13	7	13	44	58	46	Last 16	Ba-Muaka Simakala (9)

== European history ==
Season	Competition	Round	Club	Home	Away	Aggregate
2025–26	UEFA Conference League	2QR	(Greece) Aris Thessaloniki	2–1	2–2	4–3
2025–26	UEFA Conference League	3QR	(Cyprus) Omonia	0–4	0–5	0–9

Notes

- 1QR: First qualifying round
- 2QR: Second qualifying round
- 3QR: Third qualifying round
- POR: Playoff round

== Supporters ==
Supporters of Araz were drawn from all over the Nakhchivan Autonomous Republic and beyond Azerbaijan. The club's main two supporting groups were Ultra Araz and Nagshijahan AAK.

== Players ==
=== Current squad ===
As of 13 August 2026

Note: Flags indicate national team as defined under FIFA eligibility rules; some limited exceptions apply. Players may hold more than one non-FIFA nationality.

No.	Pos.	Nation	Player
1	GK	BRA	Arthur
2	DF	AZE	Abdulla Rzayev (on loan from Sabah)
5	DF	CRO	Luka Dumančić
6	MF	CPV	Patrick Andrade (Captain)
7	MF	AZE	Rövlan Muradov
8	MF	AZE	Mustafa Ahmadzada
9	FW	AZE	Agadadash Salyanski (on loan from Neftçi)
10	FW	FRA	Charles Boli
11	FW	GUI	Mohamed Mara
12	DF	BRA	Bruno Franco
13	MF	AZE	Qabil Alizada
14	FW	AZE	Ulvi Isgandarov

No.	Pos.	Nation	Player
17	DF	BFA	Issouf Paro
19	FW	BDI	Sudi Abdallah
21	FW	AZE	Ibrahim Piriyev
22	DF	AZE	Rashad Hasanov
23	MF	ESP	Alberto Fernández
26	DF	AZE	Omar Buludov
27	DF	BIH	Bojan Letić
29	MF	AZE	Ceyhun Nuriyev
36	MF	GUI	Mamadou Kané
77	MF	AZE	Nihat Mehralıyev
99	GK	AZE	Tarlan Ahmadli

For recent transfers, see Transfers summer 2026.

=== Out on loan ===
Note: Flags indicate national team as defined under FIFA eligibility rules; some limited exceptions apply. Players may hold more than one non-FIFA nationality.

No.	Pos.	Nation	Player
5	DF	AZE	Nihad Gurbanli (at MOIK)
20	MF	AZE	Turan Valizade (at Sabail)
—	MF	COL	Alejandro Herrera (at MOIK)

== Club officials ==
=== Coaching staff ===
Position	Name
Head coach	Yuriy Maksimov
Assistant coach	(Azerbaijan) Rasim Ramaldanov (Azerbaijan) Afran Ismayilov
Goalkeeping coach	(Azerbaijan) Ramiz Karimov
Physical training coach	(North Macedonia) Teodor Terziev

== Notable managers ==
Information correct as of match played 2 November 2014. Only competitive matches are counted.

Name	Nat.	From	To	P	W	D	L	GS	GA	%W	Honours	Notes
Tofig Akhundov	Soviet Union	1967	????	N/A	N/A	N/A	N/A	N/A	N/A	N/A		
Vagif Sadygov	Soviet Union	1977	1979	N/A	N/A	N/A	N/A	N/A	N/A	N/A		
Ahmad Alaskarov	Soviet Union	1979	1979	N/A	N/A	N/A	N/A	N/A	N/A	N/A		
Ali Rahmanov	Azerbaijan	199?	2000	N/A	N/A	N/A	N/A	N/A	N/A	N/A		
Boyukagha Hajiyev	Azerbaijan	1999	2000	N/A	N/A	N/A	N/A	N/A	N/A	N/A		
Asgar Abdullayev	Azerbaijan	Jun 2013	Nov 2014	30	25	4	1	66	11	83.33		

- Notes:

P – Total of played matches W – Won matches D – Drawn matches L – Lost matches GS – Goal scored GA – Goals against
%W – Percentage of matches won

Nationality is indicated by the corresponding FIFA country code(s).

== Honours ==
- Azerbaijan Premier League
  - 🥉 Third place (1):2024–25
- Azerbaijan First Division
  - 🥇 Winners: 2013–14, 2022–23
