= 2022–23 Sumgayit FK season =

Sumgayit
2022-23 season
- Chairman: Riad Rafiyev
- Manager: Alyaksey Baha (until 21 September); Samir Abbasov (from 26 September)
- Stadium: Kapital Bank Arena
- Premier League: 7th
- Azerbaijan Cup: First Round vs Kapaz
- Top goalscorer: League: Vusal Isgandarli (6); All: Vusal Isgandarli (6)

The Sumgayit FK 2022–23 season was Sumgayit's twelfth Azerbaijan Premier League season, and thirteenth season in their history.

== Season events ==
On 21 September, Alyaksey Baha left his role as Head Coach buy mutual consent, with Samir Abbasov being appointed as his replacement on 26 September.

On 27 October, Sumgayit announced the signing of Richard Gadze on a contract until the end of the 2023–24 season.

On 23 December, Sumgayit announced the signing of Terrence Tisdell from Botoșani until the summer of 2024.

On 12 January, Sumgayit announced the signing of Diego Carioca on loan from Kolos Kovalivka until the end of the season.

On 14 January, Sumgayit announced the signing of Masaki Murata from Valmiera until the summer of 2024.

On 24 January, Sumgayit announced the signing of Karim Abubakar from Bnei Yehuda on a contract until the summer of 2023, with an option for an additional year.

== Squad ==
As of match played 22 May 2023

No.	Name	Nationality	Position	Date of birth (age)	Signed from	Signed in	Contract ends	Apps.	Goals
Goalkeepers
13	Aydin Bayramov	(Azerbaijan)	GK	18 February 1996 (aged 27)	Neftchi Baku	2019		65	0
25	Ilnur Valiev	(Russia)	GK	25 June 2003 (aged 19)	Academy	2021		5	0
Defenders
3	Vurğun Hüseynov	(Azerbaijan)	DF	25 April 1988 (aged 35)	Gabala	2013		240	3
5	Steven Pereira	(Cape Verde)	DF	13 April 1994 (aged 29)	Maritzburg United	2022		23	1
12	Todor Todoroski	(North Macedonia)	DF	26 February 1999 (aged 24)	Sereď	2022		32	3
14	Elvin Badalov	(Azerbaijan)	DF	14 June 1995 (aged 27)	Sabah	2019		98	1
20	Aykhan Süleymanly	(Azerbaijan)	DF	16 January 2004 (aged 19)	on loan from Zira	2022		4	0
Midfielders
6	Vugar Mustafayev	(Azerbaijan)	MF	5 August 1994 (aged 28)	Zira	2019		110	0
8	Sabuhi Abdullazade	(Azerbaijan)	MF	18 December 2001 (aged 21)	Academy	2017		95	2
10	Vusal Isgandarli	(Azerbaijan)	MF	3 November 1995 (aged 27)	Ankara Keçiörengücü	2022		35	6
11	Rufat Abdullazade	(Azerbaijan)	MF	17 January 2001 (aged 22)	Academy	2017		74	1
17	Murad Khachayev	(Azerbaijan)	MF	14 April 1998 (aged 25)	Shakhtar Donetsk	2019		97	6
18	Suleyman Ahmadov	(Azerbaijan)	MF	25 November 1999 (aged 23)	Qarabağ	2018		100	2
21	Nihad Ahmadzade	(Azerbaijan)	MF	23 July 2006 (aged 16)	Academy	2022		9	0
22	Diego Carioca	(Brazil)	MF	6 February 1998 (aged 25)	on loan from Kolos Kovalivka	2023	2023	10	1
24	Elshan Abdullayev	(Azerbaijan)	MF	5 February 1994 (aged 29)	Sabail	2022	2024	31	1
37	Alya Toure	(Guinea)	MF	4 January 2002 (aged 21)	on loan from İstanbul Başakşehir	2022	2023	12	0
71	Masaki Murata	(Japan)	MF	29 August 1999 (aged 23)	Valmiera	2023	2024	16	0
88	Hasrat Mürsalov	(Azerbaijan)	MF	31 March 2004 (aged 19)	Energetik	2023		1	0
Forwards
7	Terrence Tisdell	(Liberia)	FW	16 March 1998 (aged 25)	Botoșani	2022	2023	13	1
9	Karim Abubakar	(Ghana)	FW	30 July 1995 (aged 27)	Bnei Yehuda	2023	2023 (+1)	18	3
23	Kamran Aliyev	(Azerbaijan)	FW	15 October 1998 (aged 24)	Arsenal Tula	2023		15	2
55	Ibrahim Aliyev	(Azerbaijan)	FW	17 July 1999 (aged 23)	Neftçi	2022		7	0
70	Ouro-Nile Toure	(Togo)	FW	31 December 1998 (aged 24)	Assisense	2022		3	0
Away on loan
Left during the season
7	Araz Abdullayev	(Azerbaijan)	MF	18 April 1992 (aged 31)	Ethnikos Achna	2022	2022 (+2)	23	2
9	Almir Aganspahić	(Bosnia and Herzegovina)	FW	12 September 1996 (aged 26)	on loan from Čukarički	2022		12	2
15	Vugar Beybalayev	(Azerbaijan)	MF	5 August 1993 (aged 29)	Telavi	2022	2024	39	1
19	Khazar Mahmudov	(Azerbaijan)	FW	23 November 2000 (aged 22)	Keşla	2021		18	0
22	Damjan Daničić	(Serbia)	DF	24 January 2000 (aged 23)	Dinamo Zagreb	2022		12	0
23	Rifat Nurmugamet	(Kazakhstan)	MF	22 May 1996 (aged 27)	Maktaaral	2022		10	0
30	Filipe Chaby	(Portugal)	MF	22 January 1994 (aged 29)	Sporting CP	2022		14	0
43	Richard Gadze	(Ghana)	FW	23 August 1994 (aged 28)	Sheikh Russel	2022	2024	8	1

== Transfers ==
=== In ===
Date	Position	Nationality	Name	From	Fee	Ref.
28 June 2022	MF	(Azerbaijan)	Vusal Isgandarli	Ankara Keçiörengücü	Undisclosed	
4 July 2022	DF	(Cape Verde)	Steven Pereira	Maritzburg United	Undisclosed	
16 July 2022	DF	(Serbia)	Damjan Daničić	Dinamo Zagreb	Undisclosed	
19 July 2022	MF	(Kazakhstan)	Rifat Nurmugamet	Maktaaral	Undisclosed	
29 July 2022	MF	(Portugal)	Filipe Chaby	Sporting CP	Undisclosed	
4 August 2022	FW	(Togo)	Ouro-Nile Toure	Assisense	Undisclosed	
10 August 2022	DF	(North Macedonia)	Todor Todoroski	Sereď	Undisclosed	
27 October 2022	FW	(Ghana)	Richard Gadze	Sheikh Russel	Undisclosed	
23 December 2022	FW	(Liberia)	Terrence Tisdell	Botoșani	Undisclosed	
1 January 2023	MF	(Azerbaijan)	Hasrat Mürsalov	Energetik	Undisclosed	
14 January 2023	MF	(Japan)	Masaki Murata	Valmiera	Undisclosed	
24 January 2023	FW	(Ghana)	Karim Abubakar	Bnei Yehuda	Undisclosed	

=== Loans in ===
Date from	Position	Nationality	Name	From	Date to	Ref.
27 July 2022	MF	(Guinea)	Alya Toure	İstanbul Başakşehir	30 June 2023	
20 August 2022	FW	(Bosnia and Herzegovina)	Almir Aganspahić	Čukarički	30 June 2023	
12 January 2023	MF	(Brazil)	Diego Carioca	Kolos Kovalivka	7 June 2023	

=== Released ===
Date	Position	Nationality	Name	Joined	Date	Ref
31 December 2022	DF	(Serbia)	Damjan Daničić	Voždovac	1 Januari 2023	
31 December 2022	MF	(Azerbaijan)	Araz Abdullayev	Llapi	22 August 2023	
31 December 2022	MF	(Azerbaijan)	Vugar Beybalayev	Iravan	1 September 2023	
31 December 2022	MF	(Kazakhstan)	Rifat Nurmugamet	Turan	17 March 2023	
31 December 2022	FW	(Azerbaijan)	Khazar Mahmudov	Kapaz	1 January 2023	
17 January 2023	MF	(Portugal)	Filipe Chaby	Belenenses	25 January 2023	
30 January 2023	FW	(Ghana)	Richard Gadze	Rajasthan United	27 September 2023	
5 June 2023	GK	(Azerbaijan)	Aydın Bayramov	Turan Tovuz		
5 June 2023	MF	(Azerbaijan)	Rufat Abdullazade	Sabail		
5 June 2023	MF	(Azerbaijan)	Suleyman Ahmadov	Sabail		
7 June 2023	FW	(Cameroon)	Karim Abubakar	Sliema Wanderers		
7 June 2023	FW	(Liberia)	Terrence Tisdell	Alittihad Misurata		

== Friendlies ==
12 January 2023	Radnik Surdulica	1 – 2	Sumgayit	Antalya, Turkey
AZT (UTC+4)	Goal	Report	Ahmadov	Stadium: Swandor Hotels & Resorts Topkapi Palace

16 January 2023	Krylia Sovetov	1 – 0	Sumgayit	Antalya, Turkey
AZT (UTC+4)	Goal	Report		Stadium: Titanic Mardan Hotel

== Competitions ==
=== Overview ===
Competition	First match	Last match	Starting round	Final position	Record							
Competition	First match	Last match	Starting round	Final position	Pld	W	D	L	GF	GA	GD	Win %
Premier League	7 August 2022	28 May 2023	Matchday 1	7th	36	8	7	21	26	70	−44	22.22
Azerbaijan Cup	23 November 2022	23 November 2022	First Round	First Round	1	0	0	1	0	1	−1	0.00
Total					37	8	7	22	26	71	−45	21.62

Last updated: 28 May 2023
Source: Competitions

=== Premier League ===
==== Results summary ====
Overall								Home						Away					
Pld	W	D	L	GF	GA	GD	Pts	W	D	L	GF	GA	GD	W	D	L	GF	GA	GD
36	8	7	21	26	70	−44	31	3	5	10	13	40	−27	5	2	11	13	30	−17

Last updated: 28 May 2023.
Source: See Results

==== Results by round ====
Round	1	2	3	4	5	6	7	8	9	10	11	12	13	14	15	16	17	18	19	20	21	22	23	24	25	26	27	28	29	30	31	32	33	34	35	36
Ground	A	H	A	H	A	H	A	H	A	A	H	A	H	A	H	A	H	A	A	H	A	H	A	H	A	A	H	A	H	A	H	A	H	H	A	H
Result	L	L	D	D	L	D	L	D	L	L	L	L	D	L	D	W	W	L	L	W	L	W	L	L	W	L	L	W	L	D	L	W	L	L	W	L
Position	10	10	9	8	8	8	8	9	9	9	10	10	10	10	10	10	8	8	8	8	8	7	7	9	7	8	8	8	8	8	8	8	8	8	7	7

Updated to match(es) played on 28 May 2023. Source: See Results
A = Away; H = Home; W = Win; D = Draw; L = Loss

==== Results ====
7 August 2022 1	Sabah	3 – 0	Sumgayit	Masazır
19:15 AZT (UTC+4)	Nuriyev 28'; Mickels 53'; Ceballos (yellow card) 88' (goal) 90+5'	Report	Pereira (yellow card) 61'; Nurmugamet (yellow card) 84'	Stadium: Bank Respublika Arena; Referee: Elcin Məsiyev

13 August 2022 2	Sumgayit	0 – 2	Qarabağ	Sumgait
18:20 AZT (UTC+4)	Isgandarli (yellow card) 6'; Abdullazade (yellow card) 13'; Pereira (yellow card) 30'; Daničić (yellow card) 79'; Abdullayev (yellow card) 83'	Report	Qurbanlı (yellow card) 30' (goal) 90+3'; Mammadov (yellow card) 90+1'; Ozobić 90+7'	Stadium: Kapital Bank Arena; Referee: Tural Qurbanov

21 August 2022 3	Zira	0 – 0	Sumgayit	Zirə
20:30 AZT (UTC+4)	Akhmedzade (yellow card) 75'	Report	Mustafayev (yellow card) 75'	Stadium: Zira Olympic Sport Complex Stadium; Referee: Ravan Hamzazada

26 August 2022 4	Sumgayit	0 – 0	Turan Tovuz	Sumgait
19:00 AZT (UTC+4)	Mustafayev (yellow card) 15'; Abdullazade (yellow card) 23'	Report	Seyidov (yellow card) 45+1'	Stadium: Kapital Bank Arena; Referee: Ingilab Mammadov

3 September 2022 5	Neftçi	3 – 0	Sumgayit	Baku
20:30 AZT (UTC+4)	Lawal (yellow card) 16'; Jaber 19'; Eddy (yellow card) 42'; Mahmudov 55' (pen.); Hajiyev 77'	Report	Pereira (yellow card) 16'; Abdullazade (yellow card) 60'	Stadium: Bakcell Arena; Referee: Kamal Umudlu

11 September 2022 6	Sumgayit	1 – 1	Shamakhi	Sumgait
18:00 AZT (UTC+4)	Aganspahić 3' (pen.)	Report	Haziyev 45'; Rahimli (yellow card) 89'	Stadium: Kapital Bank Arena; Referee: Farid Haciyev

17 September 2022 7	Gabala	1 – 0	Sumgayit	Qabala
19:00 AZT (UTC+4)	Ramon 7'; Muradov (red card) 84'; Utzig (yellow card) 85'; Ruan (yellow card) 90+3'; Ağayev (yellow card) 90+6'	Report	Abdullazade (yellow card) 85'; Nurmugamet (yellow card) 90+5'	Stadium: City Stadium; Referee: Elcin Masiyev

2 October 2022 8	Sumgayit	0 – 0	Kapaz	Sumgait
18:00 AZT (UTC+4)	Pereira (yellow card) 68'	Report	Keshavarzi (yellow card) 30'; Kvirkvia (yellow card) 35'; Rzayev (yellow card) 59'; Kantaria (yellow card) 87'	Stadium: Kapital Bank Arena; Referee: Farid Haciyev

8 October 2022 9	Sabail	1 – 0	Sumgayit	Baku
17:00 AZT (UTC+4)	Manafov 38' (yellow card) 45+3'	Report	Mustafayev (yellow card) 45+2'; Todoroski (yellow card) 45+3'	Stadium: Bayil Arena; Referee: Ravan Hamzazada

16 October 2022 10	Qarabağ	3 – 1	Sumgayit	Baku
17:30 AZT (UTC+4)	Ozobić (yellow card) 15'; Sheydayev 67', 88' (pen.); Qurbanlı 73'	Report	Aganspahić 55'; Aliyev (yellow card) 86'	Stadium: Azersun Arena; Referee: Aliyar Agayev

22 October 2022 11	Sumgayit	0 – 2	Zira	Sumgait
18:30 AZT (UTC+4)	Pereira (yellow card) 15'; Toure (yellow card) 90+4'	Report	Sadykhov 16' (pen.); Hajili (yellow card) 33'; Taşqın 71'	Stadium: Kapital Bank Arena; Referee: Farid Haciyev

28 October 2022 12	Turan Tovuz	2 – 0	Sumgayit	Tovuz
16:00 AZT (UTC+4)	Aliyev (yellow card) 28' (goal) 88'; Najafov (yellow card) 43'; Okebugwu (yellow card) 75'	Report		Stadium: City Stadium; Referee: Nicat İsmayıllı

5 November 2022 13	Sumgayit	2 – 2	Neftçi	Sumgait
20:00 AZT (UTC+4)	Gadze 41'; Khachayev 61'; Isgandarli (yellow card) 62'; Daničić (yellow card) 70'; Bayramov (yellow card) 90+7'	Report	Donyoh 47'; Kvirkvelia (yellow card) 57'; Jaber 87'	Stadium: Kapital Bank Arena; Referee: Javid Jalilov

11 November 2022 14	Shamakhi	4 – 2	Sumgayit	Shamakhi
14:30 AZT (UTC+4)	Shahmuradov 8'; N.Guliyev 33'; K.Guliyev 62', 66'	Report	Isgandarli 14'; Gadze (yellow card) 48'; Hüseynov (yellow card) 56'; Beybalayev (yellow card) 57'; Abdullazade 68'	Stadium: City Stadium; Referee: Elcin Məsiyev

29 November 2022 15	Sumgayit	1 – 1	Gabala	Sumgait
16:30 AZT (UTC+4)	Ahmadov (yellow card) 30'; Todoroski 79'; Abdullazade (yellow card) 82'; Abdullazade (yellow card) 90+2'	Report	Alimi 74' (pen.)	Stadium: Kapital Bank Arena; Referee: Elcin Masiyev

4 December 2022 16	Kapaz	0 – 1	Sumgayit	Ganja
14:30 AZT (UTC+4)	Isaiah (yellow card) 30'	Report	Mustafayev (yellow card) 60' (yellow-red card) 83'; Hüseynov 89'; Khachayev (yellow card) 90+2'	Stadium: City Stadium; Referee: Tural Qurbanov

14 December 2022 17	Sumgayit	2 – 0	Sabail	Sumgait
19:00 AZT (UTC+4)	Pereira 9' (yellow card) 27'; Isgandarli 54' (yellow card) 57'; Ahmadov (yellow card) 56'	Report	Maharramli (yellow card) 29'; Martinov (yellow card) 45+2'	Stadium: Kapital Bank Arena; Referee: Tural Qurbanov

23 December 2023 18	Sumgayit	0 – 6	Sabah	Sumgait
18:30 AZT (UTC+4)	Badalov (yellow card) 68'; Mustafayev (yellow card) 79'	Report	Apeh 3' (yellow card) 20'; Mickels 14'; Kashchuk 28'; Camalov 33'; Nuriyev 77'; Khaybulayev (yellow card) 84'; Volkovi 85'	Stadium: Kapital Bank Arena; Referee: Aliyar Agayev

25 January 2023 19	Zira	3 – 1	Sumgayit	Zirə
16:30 AZT (UTC+4)	Hajili (yellow card) 15'; Chantakias 50'; Brogno 73'; Gomes 79'	Report	Isgandarli 4'; Todoroski (yellow card) 20'; Abdullazade (yellow card) 57'	Stadium: Zira Olympic Sport Complex Stadium; Referee: Kamranbay Rahimov

30 January 2023 20	Sumgayit	2 – 1	Turan Tovuz	Sumgait
18:00 AZT (UTC+4)	Todoroski 28'; M.Murata (yellow card) 40'; Abubakar 48' (yellow card) 51'	Report	Oduwa (yellow card) 33'; Eva 40' (yellow card) 84'; Guseynov (yellow card) 86'; Okebugwu (yellow card) 90+3'	Stadium: Kapital Bank Arena; Referee: Rauf Allahverdiyev

5 February 2023 21	Neftçi	2 – 0	Sumgayit	Baku
18:30 AZT (UTC+4)	Lebon (yellow card) 39'; Aliyev (yellow card) 43'; Mahmudov (yellow card) 45'; Kvirkvelia 54'; Saldanha 64'	Report	Mustafayev (yellow card) 34'; Tisdell (yellow card) 43'	Stadium: Bakcell Arena; Referee: Elcin Masiyev

12 February 2023 22	Sumgayit	1 – 0	Shamakhi	Sumgait
17:30 AZT (UTC+4)	Abubakar 25'; Badalov (yellow card) 48'; Bayramov (yellow card) 90+2'	Report	Hüseynov (yellow card) 45'; Azizli (yellow card) 90'	Stadium: Kapital Bank Arena; Referee: Ravan Hamzazada

18 February 2023 23	Gabala	2 – 1	Sumgayit	Qabala
15:00 AZT (UTC+4)	Alimi (yellow card) 30'; Isgandarov 45'; Abu Akel (yellow card) 45+3'; Utzig 56'; Ruan (yellow card) 90+4'	Report	Hüseynov (yellow card) 45+3'; Mustafayev (yellow card) 65'; Alimi 85' (o.g.); Todoroski (yellow card) 90+2'	Stadium: City Stadium; Referee: Aliyar Agayev

25 February 2023 24	Sumgayit	1 – 2	Kapaz	Sumgait
17:00 AZT (UTC+4)	Hüseynov (yellow card) 45+2'; Abdullazade (yellow card) 85'; Nabiyev 89' (o.g.); Bayramov (yellow card) 90+5'	Report	Isaiah 7' (yellow card) 77'; Kantaria (yellow card) 15'; Juninho 38'; Kvirkvia (yellow card) 43'; Khvalko (yellow card) 56'	Stadium: Kapital Bank Arena; Referee: Elcin Masiyev

4 March 2023 25	Sabail	0 – 1	Sumgayit	Baku
16:00 AZT (UTC+4)	Chekh (yellow card) 55'; França (red card) 63'; Ramazanov (yellow card) 85'; Amirli (yellow card) 90+7'	Report	Murata (yellow card) 55'; Badalov (yellow card) 61'; Tisdell 90+7' (pen.)	Stadium: Bayil Arena; Referee: Raad Ahmədov

10 March 2023 26	Sabah	4 – 0	Sumgayit	Masazır
19:00 AZT (UTC+4)	Letić (yellow card) 37'; Mickels 45'; Kashchuk 75'; Nuriyev 86'; Mammadov 90+2' (yellow card) 90+3'	Report	Todoroski (yellow card) 37'; Mustafayev (yellow card) 51'; Pereira (yellow card) 83'	Stadium: Bank Respublika Arena; Referee: Tural Qurbanov

15 March 2023 27	Sumgayit	0 – 6	Qarabağ	Sumgait
18:00 AZT (UTC+4)	Badalov (yellow card) 78'	Report	Andrade 7', 49'; Qurbanlı 12', 45+3'; Zoubir 21'; Abdullazade 88' (o.g.)	Stadium: Kapital Bank Arena; Referee: Javid Jalilov

31 March 2023 28	Turan Tovuz	2 – 3	Sumgayit	Tovuz
15:30 AZT (UTC+4)	Oduwa 7'; Wankewai 33'; Marandici (yellow card) 73'; Okebugwu (yellow card) 86'; Shahverdiyev (yellow card) 87'	Report	K.Aliyev 11', 68'; Pereira (yellow card) 47'; Carioca 58' (pen.); Khachayev (yellow card) 87'; Mustafayev (red card) 90+4'	Stadium: City Stadium; Referee: Raad Ahmədov

8 April 2023 29	Sumgayit	0 – 4	Neftçi	Sumgait
20:00 AZT (UTC+4)	Abdullazade (yellow card) 22'; Isgandarli (yellow card) 29'	Report	Stanković 8'; Haghverdi (yellow card) 40'; Saldanha (yellow card) 49'; Meza 64'; Zulfugarli 83'; Lebon 85'; Saief (yellow card) 90+1'	Stadium: Kapital Bank Arena; Referee: Rauf Allahverdiyev

16 April 2023 30	Shamakhi	0 – 0	Sumgayit	Shamakhi
16:00 AZT (UTC+4)	Mardanov (yellow card) 29'; Hüseynov (yellow card) 45+1'	Report	Pereira (yellow card) 9'; Hüseynov (yellow card) 86'	Stadium: City Stadium; Referee: Farid Haciyev

23 April 2023 31	Sumgayit	2 – 3	Gabala	Sumgait
18:00 AZT (UTC+4)	Isgandarli (yellow card) 23' (goal) 58'; Todoroski (yellow card) 52'; Abubakar 63'; Valiev (yellow card) 87'	Report	Utzig (yellow card) 27'; Abbasov (yellow card) 52'; Alimi (yellow card) 60'; Abu Akel (yellow card) 73'; Hani 74'; Safarov 78'; Ramon 90+4'; Stryzhak (yellow card) 90+4'; Felipe (yellow card) 90+5'	Stadium: Kapital Bank Arena; Referee: Rauf Jabbarov

29 April 2023 32	Kapaz	0 – 1	Sumgayit	Ganja
16:00 AZT (UTC+4)		Report	Ahmadov (yellow card) 42'; Aliyev (yellow card) 53'; Isgandarli 64'; Carioca (yellow card) 88'	Stadium: Ganja City; Referee: Tural Qurbanov

7 May 2023 33	Sumgayit	1 – 3	Sabail	Sumgait
19:00 AZT (UTC+4)	Isgandarli (yellow card) 35'; Todoroski 37' (yellow card) 88'; Süleymanly (yellow card) 84'	Report	Hasanov (yellow card) 39'; Muradov (yellow card) 45'; Ljujić 70', 73'; Manafov (yellow card) 84'; Mazurek 90'	Stadium: Kapital Bank Arena; Referee: Ingilab Mammadov

17 May 2023 34	Sumgayit	0 – 4	Sabah	Sumgait
19:30 AZT (UTC+4)	Todoroski (yellow card) 29'; Khachayev (yellow card) 53'; Pereira (yellow card) 65'; Abdullazade (yellow card) 80'	Report	Irazabal 34'; Volkovi 44' hristian 45+1'; Ceballos (yellow card) 61' (goal) 72'	Stadium: Kapital Bank Arena; Referee: Javid Jalilov

22 May 2023 35	Qarabağ	1 – 2	Sumgayit	Baku
16:30 AZT (UTC+4)	Guseynov (yellow card) 32'; Sheydayev (yellow card) 73'; Richard 89'	Report	Isgandarli 33' (pen.); Abdullazade 39'; Pereira (yellow card) 55'; Mustafayev (yellow card) 80'	Stadium: Azersun Arena; Referee: Raad Ahmadov

28 May 2023 36	Sumgayit	0 – 3	Zira	Sumgait
17:30 AZT (UTC+4)	Murata (yellow card) 7'; Süleymanly (yellow card) 89'	Report	Sadykhov 10', 67'; Ibrahim (yellow card) 32'; Alıyev (yellow card) 89'; Gomes 90' (yellow card) 90'	Stadium: Kapital Bank Arena; Referee: Tural Qurbanov

==== League table ====
Pos	Team	Pld	W	D	L	GF	GA	GD	Pts
5	Zira	36	13	11	12	45	46	−1	50
6	Turan Tovuz	36	10	9	17	36	49	−13	39
7	Sumgayit	36	8	7	21	26	70	−44	31
8	Kapaz	36	6	13	17	34	62	−28	31
9	Sabail	36	7	8	21	32	62	−30	29

Source: Soccerway
Rules for classification: 1) Points; 2) Head-to-head points; 3) Head-to-head goal difference; 4) Head-to-head goals scored; 5) Head-to-head away goals scored (only if two teams); 6) Goal difference; 7) Goals scored.

=== Azerbaijan Cup ===
23 November 2022 First round	Kapaz	1 – 0	Sumgayit	Ganja
14:00 AZT (UTC+4)	Ergemlidze 9'; Kantaria (yellow card) 49'; Z.Aliyev (yellow card) 83'; Sadigli (yellow card) 90+7'	Report	Mustafayev (yellow card) 67'; Chaby (yellow card) 90+3'; Isgandarli (yellow card) 90+5'	Stadium: City Stadium; Referee: Inqilab Mammadov

== Squad statistics ==
As of match played 28 May 2023

=== Appearances and goals ===
No.	Pos	Nat	Player	Total		Premier League		Azerbaijan Cup	
No.	Pos	Nat	Player	Apps	Goals	Apps	Goals	Apps	Goals
3	DF	(Azerbaijan) AZE	Vurğun Hüseynov	26	1	25	1	1	0
5	DF	(Cape Verde) CPV	Steven Pereira	23	1	22	1	1	0
6	MF	(Azerbaijan) AZE	Vugar Mustafayev	32	0	31	0	1	0
7	FW	(Liberia) LBR	Terrence Tisdell	13	1	8+5	1	0	0
8	MF	(Azerbaijan) AZE	Sabuhi Abdullazade	36	1	32+3	1	1	0
9	FW	(Ghana) GHA	Karim Abubakar	18	3	15+3	3	0	0
10	MF	(Azerbaijan) AZE	Vusal Isgandarli	35	6	30+4	6	1	0
11	MF	(Azerbaijan) AZE	Rufat Abdullazade	19	1	5+13	1	0+1	0
12	DF	(North Macedonia) MKD	Todor Todoroski	32	3	31	3	1	0
13	GK	(Azerbaijan) AZE	Aydın Bayramov	33	0	32	0	1	0
14	DF	(Azerbaijan) AZE	Elvin Badalov	35	0	33+1	0	1	0
17	MF	(Azerbaijan) AZE	Murad Khachayev	31	1	27+3	1	1	0
18	MF	(Azerbaijan) AZE	Suleyman Ahmadov	28	0	19+9	0	0	0
20	DF	(Azerbaijan) AZE	Aykhan Süleymanly	4	0	1+3	0	0	0
21	MF	(Azerbaijan) AZE	Nihad Ahmadzade	9	0	1+8	0	0	0
22	MF	(Brazil) BRA	Diego Carioca	10	1	8+2	1	0	0
23	FW	(Azerbaijan) AZE	Kamran Aliyev	15	2	12+3	2	0	0
24	MF	(Azerbaijan) AZE	Elshan Abdullayev	6	0	0+6	0	0	0
25	GK	(Russia) RUS	Ilnur Valiev	5	0	5	0	0	0
37	MF	(Guinea) GUI	Alya Toure	12	0	3+9	0	0	0
55	FW	(Azerbaijan) AZE	Ibrahim Aliyev	3	0	0+3	0	0	0
70	FW	(Togo) TOG	Ouro-Nile Toure	3	0	2+1	0	0	0
71	MF	(Japan) JPN	Masaki Murata	15	0	15	0	0	0
88	MF	(Azerbaijan) AZE	Hasrat Mürsalov	1	0	0+1	0	0	0
Players away on loan:
Players who left Sumgayit during the season:
7	MF	(Azerbaijan) AZE	Araz Abdullayev	10	0	3+7	0	0	0
9	FW	(Bosnia and Herzegovina) BIH	Almir Aganspahić	12	2	8+4	2	0	0
15	MF	(Azerbaijan) AZE	Vugar Beybalayev	6	0	4+2	0	0	0
19	FW	(Azerbaijan) AZE	Khazar Mahmudov	2	0	0+1	0	0+1	0
22	DF	(Serbia) SRB	Damjan Daničić	12	0	8+3	0	1	0
23	MF	(Kazakhstan) KAZ	Rifat Nurmugamet	10	0	2+7	0	0+1	0
30	MF	(Portugal) POR	Filipe Chaby	14	0	8+5	0	0+1	0
43	FW	(Ghana) GHA	Richard Gadze	8	1	6+1	1	1	0

=== Goal scorers ===
Place	Position	Nation	Number	Name	Premier League	Azerbaijan Cup	Total
1	MF	(Azerbaijan)	10	Vusal Isgandarli	6	0	6
2	FW	(Cameroon)	9	Karim Abubakar	3	0	3
2	DF	(North Macedonia)	12	Todor Todoroski	3	0	3
4	FW	(Bosnia and Herzegovina)	9	Almir Aganspahić	2	0	2
4	FW	(Azerbaijan)	23	Kamran Aliyev	2	0	2
4				Own goal	2	0	2
7	FW	(Ghana)	43	Richard Gadze	1	0	1
7	MF	(Azerbaijan)	17	Murad Khachayev	1	0	1
7	MF	(Azerbaijan)	11	Rufat Abdullazade	1	0	1
7	DF	(Azerbaijan)	3	Vurğun Hüseynov	1	0	1
7	DF	(Cape Verde)	5	Steven Pereira	1	0	1
7	FW	(Liberia)	7	Terrence Tisdell	1	0	1
7	MF	(Brazil)	22	Diego Carioca	1	0	1
7	MF	(Azerbaijan)	8	Sabuhi Abdullazade	1	0	1
				TOTALS	26	0	26

=== Clean sheets ===
Place	Position	Nation	Number	Name	Premier League	Azerbaijan Cup	Total
1	GK	(Azerbaijan)	13	Aydin Bayramov	8	0	8
2	GK	(Russia)	25	Ilnur Valiev	1	0	1
				TOTALS	8	0	8

=== Disciplinary record ===
Number	Nation	Position	Name	Premier League		Azerbaijan Cup		Total	
Number	Nation	Position	Name	Yellow card	Red card	Yellow card	Red card	Yellow card	Red card
3	(Azerbaijan)	DF	Vurğun Hüseynov	4	0	0	0	4	0
5	(Cape Verde)	DF	Steven Pereira	11	0	0	0	11	0
6	(Azerbaijan)	MF	Vugar Mustafayev	10	2	1	0	11	2
7	(Liberia)	FW	Terrence Tisdell	1	0	0	0	1	0
8	(Azerbaijan)	MF	Sabuhi Abdullazade	7	0	0	0	7	0
9	(Cameroon)	FW	Karim Abubakar	1	0	0	0	1	0
10	(Azerbaijan)	MF	Vusal Isgandarli	6	0	1	0	7	0
11	(Azerbaijan)	MF	Rufat Abdullazade	3	0	0	0	3	0
12	(North Macedonia)	DF	Todor Todoroski	7	0	0	0	7	0
13	(Azerbaijan)	GK	Aydın Bayramov	3	0	0	0	3	0
14	(Azerbaijan)	DF	Elvin Badalov	4	0	0	0	4	0
17	(Azerbaijan)	MF	Murad Khachayev	3	0	0	0	3	0
18	(Azerbaijan)	MF	Suleyman Ahmadov	3	0	0	0	3	0
20	(Azerbaijan)	DF	Aykhan Süleymanly	2	0	0	0	2	0
22	(Brazil)	MF	Diego Carioca	1	0	0	0	1	0
23	(Russia)	FW	Kamran Aliyev	1	0	0	0	1	0
25	(Russia)	GK	Ilnur Valiev	1	0	0	0	1	0
37	(Guinea)	MF	Alya Toure	1	0	0	0	1	0
55	(Azerbaijan)	FW	Ibrahim Aliyev	1	0	0	0	1	0
71	(Japan)	MF	Masaki Murata	3	0	0	0	3	0
Players who left Sumgayit during the season:
7	(Azerbaijan)	MF	Araz Abdullayev	1	0	0	0	1	0
15	(Azerbaijan)	MF	Vugar Beybalayev	1	0	0	0	1	0
22	(Serbia)	DF	Damjan Daničić	2	0	0	0	2	0
23	(Kazakhstan)	MF	Rifat Nurmugamet	2	0	0	0	2	0
30	(Portugal)	MF	Filipe Chaby	0	0	1	0	1	0
43	(Ghana)	FW	Richard Gadze	1	0	0	0	1	0
			TOTALS	80	2	3	0	83	2
