= List of Sumgayit FK records and statistics =

Sumgayit FK is an Azerbaijani professional football club based in Sumqayit.

This list encompasses the major records set by the club and their players in the Azerbaijan Premier League. The player records section includes details of the club's goalscorers and those who have made more than 50 appearances in first-team competitions.

== Player ==
=== Most appearances ===
As of Match played 18 February 2023

Players played over 50 competitive, professional matches only. Appearances as substitute (goals in parentheses) included in total.

	Name	Years	League	Azerbaijan Cup	Europe	Total
1	(Azerbaijan) **Vurğun Hüseynov**	2013–Present	207 (3)	16 (0)	2 (0)	**226** (3)
2	(Azerbaijan) Bəxtiyar Həsənalızadə	2011-2018	160 (4)	14 (0)	(-)	**174** (4)
3	(Azerbaijan) Slavik Alkhasov	2011-2013; 2014-2016	128 (3)	7 (1)	(-)	**135** (3)
4	(Azerbaijan) Khayal Najafov	2014–2021	105 (2)	17 (1)	1 (0)	**123** (3)
5	(Azerbaijan) Amil Yunanov	2015–2018; 2019–2020	91 (28)	10 (6)	(-)	**101** (34)
6	(Azerbaijan) **Vugar Mustafayev**	2019–Present	86 (0)	11 (0)	3 (0)	**100** (0)
7	(Azerbaijan) Aleksandr Chertoganov	2013-2016	85 (1)	5	(-)	**90** (1)
7	(Azerbaijan) **Suleyman Ahmadov**	2016–Present	77 (1)	10 (1)	3 (0)	**90** (2)
9	(Azerbaijan) Pardis Fardjad-Azad	2012-2016	84 (22)	4 (1)	(-)	**88** (23)
10	(Azerbaijan) **Murad Khachayev**	2018–Present	74 (6)	11 (0)	2 (0)	**87** (6)
11	(Azerbaijan) **Elvin Badalov**	2019–Present	72 (1)	11 (0)	3 (0)	**86** (1)
12	(Azerbaijan) Samir Abbasov	2011–2014	82 (3)	2 (0)	(-)	**84** (3)
12	(Azerbaijan) Murad Agayev	2011-2013; 2014-2016	81 (5)	3 (0)	(-)	**84** (5)
12	(Azerbaijan) Rail Malikov	2016–2020	73 (0)	11 (0)	(-)	**84** (0)
15	(Azerbaijan) Uğur Pamuk	2012-2013; 2014-2016	78 (8)	2 (0)	(-)	**80** (8)
16	(Azerbaijan) Ragim Sadykhov	2019–2022	66 (16)	10 (3)	3 (0)	**79** (19)
17	(Azerbaijan) Mekhti Dzhenetov	2017–2021	63 (0)	13 (0)	1 (0)	**77** (0)
18	(Russia) Dzhamaldin Khodzhaniyazov	2019–2022	64 (4)	8 (0)	3 (0)	**75** (0)
19	(Azerbaijan) Orkhan Aliyev	2011-2015	71 (14)	2 (0)	(-)	**73** (14)
20	(Azerbaijan) **Rufat Abdullazade**	2017–Present	60 (1)	8 (0)	3 (0)	**71** (1)
21	(Azerbaijan) Magomed Kurbanov	2014–2017	67 (20)	2 (1)	(-)	**69** (21)
22	(Azerbaijan) Andrey Popovich	2011-2012; 2013-2015; 2022	67 (0)	1 (0)	(-)	**68** (0)
23	(Azerbaijan) Mahammad Mirzabeyov	2012-2014	62 (1)	1 (0)	(-)	**63** (1)
23	(Azerbaijan) Nodar Mammadov	2013-2015	60 (0)	3	(-)	**63** (8)
23	(Azerbaijan) Azər Salahlı	2016–2018	55 (2)	8 (0)	(-)	**63** (2)
26	(Azerbaijan) Yusif Nabiyev	2016–2017; 2018–2019; 2021–2022	50 (4)	7 (0)	2 (0)	**59** (4)
27	(Azerbaijan) **Aydın Bayramov**	2019–Present	48 (0)	7 (0)	2 (0)	**57** (0)
28	(Azerbaijan) Tellur Mutallimov	2020-2022	49 (4)	5 (0)	2 (0)	**56** (4)
29	(Azerbaijan) Ruslan Qurbanov	2011–2012; 2012–13; 2013	53 (8)	1 (0)	(-)	**54** (8)
29	(Azerbaijan) Farhad Valiyev	2016–2018	51 (0)	3 (0)	(-)	**54** (0)
31	(Azerbaijan) Elvin Mammadov	2018-2019; 2020-2022	44 (2)	8 (0)	1 (0)	**53** (2)
32	(Azerbaijan) Ali Ghorbani	2020-2022	42 (14)	7 (1)	3 (0)	**52** (15)

=== Overall scorers ===
As of Match played 18 February 2023
Competitive, professional matches only, appearances including substitutes appear in brackets.

	Name	Years	League	Azerbaijan Cup	Europe	Total
1	(Azerbaijan) Amil Yunanov	2015–2018; 2019–2020	28 (91)	6 (10)	(-)	**34** (101)
2	(Azerbaijan) Pardis Fardjad-Azad	2012–2013	22 (84)	1 (4)	(-)	**23** (88)
3	(Azerbaijan) Magomed Kurbanov	2014–2017	20 (67)	1 (2)	(-)	**21** (69)
4	(Azerbaijan) Ragim Sadykhov	2019–2022	16 (66)	3 (10)	0 (3)	**19** (79)
5	(Azerbaijan) Ali Ghorbani	2020–2022	14 (42)	1 (7)	0 (3)	**15** (52)
6	(Azerbaijan) Orkhan Aliyev	2011-2015	14 (71)	0 (2)	(-)	**14** (73)
7	(Iran) Peyman Babaei	2016–2017	10 (30)	3 (5)	(-)	**13** (35)
8	**Own goal**	2011–Present	11 (-)	1 (-)	0 (0)	**12** (-)
9	(Azerbaijan) Ruslan Qurbanov	2011–2012, 2012–2013, 2013	9 (53)	0 (1)	(-)	**9** (54)
10	(Azerbaijan) Uğur Pamuk	2012-2013, 2014-2016	8 (78)	0 (2)	(-)	**8** (80)
10	(Azerbaijan) Mirabdulla Abbasov	2016–2017	8 (27)	0 (3)	(-)	**8** (30)
12	(Azerbaijan) Javid Imamverdiyev	2017–2018; 2020–2021	6 (41)	1 (5)	(-)	**7** (46)
12	(Israel) Amir Agayev	2019–2020	6 (26)	6 (-)	(-)	**7** (32)
14	(Azerbaijan) **Murad Khachayev**	2018–Present	6 (74)	0 (11)	0 (2)	**6** (87)
14	(Azerbaijan) Vagif Javadov	2016	6 (29)	0 (3)	(-)	**6** (32)
16	(Azerbaijan) Kamil Nurahmedov	2011–2012	4 (32)	1 (2)	(-)	**5** (34)
16	(Azerbaijan) Murad Agayev	2011–2013; 2014-2016	5 (81)	0 (3)	(-)	**5** (84)
16	(Azerbaijan) Aghabala Ramazanov	2015-2016	5 (33)	0 (1)	(-)	**5** (34)
16	(Azerbaijan) Ulvi Isgandarov	2018–2019	3 (18)	2 (2)	(-)	**5** (20)
16	(Iran) Mehdi Sharifi	2019–2020	5 (26)	0 (7)	(-)	**5** (33)
21	(Azerbaijan) Mirzaga Huseynpur	2013-2014; 2015	4 (45)	0 (1)	(-)	**4** (46)
21	(Azerbaijan) Slavik Alkhasov	2011–2013, 2014-2016	3 (128)	1 (7)	(-)	**4** (135)
21	(Azerbaijan) Tofig Mikayilov	2014-2016	4 (46)	0 (2)	(-)	**4** (48)
21	(Azerbaijan) Bəxtiyar Həsənalızadə	2011–2018	4 (160)	0 (14)	(-)	**4** (174)
21	(Azerbaijan) Tural Akhundov	2017–2018	4 (27)	0 (5)	(-)	**4** (32)
21	(Azerbaijan) Rashad Eyyubov	2017–2018	3 (23)	1 (5)	(-)	**4** (28)
21	(Azerbaijan) Yusif Nabiyev	2016–2017; 2018–2019; 2021–2022	4 (50)	0 (7)	0 (2)	**4** (59)
21	(Azerbaijan) Şehriyar Aliyev	2018–2020	3 (34)	1 (7)	(-)	**4** (41)
21	(Azerbaijan) Tellur Mutallimov	2020–2022	4 (49)	0 (5)	0 (2)	**4** (56)
21	(Russia) Dzhamaldin Khodzhaniyazov	2019–2022	4 (64)	0 (8)	0 (3)	**4** (75)
31	(Azerbaijan) Samir Abbasov	2011–2014	3 (82)	0 (2)	(-)	**3** (84)
31	(Azerbaijan) Rahman Hajiyev	2014	3 (18)	0 (0)	(-)	**3** (18)
31	(Germany) Kiyan Soltanpour	2014	3 (11)	0 (1)	(-)	**3** (12)
31	(Azerbaijan) Nijat Gurbanov	2018–2019	2 (22)	1 (6)	(-)	**3** (28-)
31	(Netherlands) Attila Yıldırım	2018–2019	3 (16)	0 (2)	(-)	**3** (18)
31	(Azerbaijan) Afran Ismayilov	2016–2017	3 (20)	0 (4)	(-)	**3** (24)
31	(Azerbaijan) Khayal Najafov	2014–2021	2 (105)	1 (17)	(-)	**3** (123)
31	(Azerbaijan) **Vusal Isgandarli**	2022–Present	3 (22)	0 (1)	0 (-)	**3** (24)
31	(Azerbaijan) **Vurğun Hüseynov**	2013–Present	3 (207)	0 (16)	0 (2)	**3** (226)
31	**Awarded**	2011–Present	3 (-)	0 (-)	(-)	**3** (-)
41	(Azerbaijan) Eshgin Guliyev	2011–2012	2 (18)	0 (1)	(-)	**2** (19)
41	(Azerbaijan) Emin Mustafayev	2011–2012	2 (24)	0 (2)	(-)	**2** (26)
41	(Azerbaijan) Eldar Mammadov	2011–2012	2 (12)	0 (1)	(-)	**2** (13)
41	(Azerbaijan) Samir Abdulov	2011–2012	1 (10)	1 (1)	(-)	**2** (11)
41	(Azerbaijan) Sabir Allahquliyev	2012–2013	2 (26)	0 (1)	(-)	**2** (27)
41	(Azerbaijan) Vugar Asgarov	2013	2 (12)	0 (0)	(-)	**2** (12)
41	(Azerbaijan) Mikayil Rahimov	2015–2016	2 (9)	0 (1)	(-)	**2** (10)
41	(Azerbaijan) Azər Salahlı	2016–20187	2 (55)	0 (8)	(-)	**2** (63)
41	(Azerbaijan) Bəhlul Mustafazadə	2017–2018	2 (20)	0 (5)	(-)	**2** (25)
41	(Azerbaijan) Kamal Mirzayev	2017–2018	0 (18)	2 (5)	(-)	**2** (23)
41	(Azerbaijan) Elvin Mammadov	2018–2019; 2020–2022	2 (44)	0 (8)	0 (1)	**2** (53)
41	(Azerbaijan) Javid Taghiyev	2017–2019	2 (43)	0 (6)	(-)	**2** (49)
41	(Azerbaijan) Elvin Cafarguliyev	2019–2020	2 (17)	0 (3)	(-)	**2** (20)
41	(Azerbaijan) Araz Abdullayev	2022	1 (23)	1 (1)	0 (-)	**2** (24)
41	(Bosnia and Herzegovina) Almir Aganspahić	2022	2 (13)	0 (0)	0 (-)	**2** (13)
41	(North Macedonia) **Todor Todoroski**	2022–Present	2 (21)	0 (1)	0 (-)	**2** (22)
41	(Cameroon) **Karim Abubakar**	2023–Present	2 (5)	0 (0)	0 (-)	**2** (5)
41	(Azerbaijan) **Suleyman Ahmadov**	2016–Present	1 (77)	1 (10)	0 (3)	**2** (90)
59	(Azerbaijan) Timur Israfilov	2011–2012	1 (20)	0 (0)	(-)	**1** (20)
59	(Azerbaijan) Orkhan Hasanov	2011–2012	1 (17)	0 (1)	(-)	**1** (18)
59	(Azerbaijan) Murad Sattarli	2011–2012	1 (12)	0 (1)	(-)	**1** (13)
59	(Azerbaijan) Yasin Abbasov	2011–2012	1 (6)	0 (0)	(-)	**1** (6)
59	(Azerbaijan) Murad Hüseynov	2012	0 (5)	1 (1)	(-)	**1** (6)
59	(Azerbaijan) Aftandil Hacıyev	2012–2013	1 (17)	0 (0)	(-)	**1** (17)
59	(Azerbaijan) Emin Jafarguliyev	2012–2013	1 (23)	0 (1)	(-)	**1** (24)
59	(Turkey) Can Akgün	2013	1 (13)	0 (0)	(-)	**1** (13)
59	(Azerbaijan) Mahammad Mirzabeyov	2012–2014	1 (62)	0 (1)	(-)	**1** (63)
59	(Azerbaijan) Ceyhun Sultanov	2012	1 (16)	0 (0)	(-)	**1** (16)
59	(Germany) Murat Doymus	2012–2013	1 (26)	0 (0)	(-)	**1** (26)
59	(Turkey) Taner Taktak	2012–2013	1 (20)	0 (0)	(-)	**1** (20)<!-
59	(Azerbaijan) Tarzin Jahangirov	2014–2015	1 (45)	0 (0)	(-)	**1** (45)
59	(Azerbaijan) Ruslan Nasirli	2011–2014	1 (23)	0 (2)	(-)	**1** (25)
59	(Azerbaijan) Nurlan Novruzov	2013	1 (15)	0 (1)	(-)	**1** (16)
59	(Azerbaijan) Elshan Abdullayev	2013; 2022–Present	1 (27)	0 (3)	(-)	**1** (30)
59	(Azerbaijan) Aleksandr Chertoganov	2013–2016	1 (85)	0 (5)	(-)	**1** (90)
59	(Azerbaijan) Ramazan Abbasov	2014	1 (10)	0 (1)	(-)	**1** (11)
59	(Azerbaijan) Nuran Gurbanov	2015	1 (11)	0 (1)	(-)	**1** (12)
59	(Azerbaijan) Emin Mehdiyev	2015–2016	1 (20)	0 (3)	(-)	**1** (23)
59	(Azerbaijan) Seymur Asadov	2016–2017	1 (14)	0 (1)	(-)	**1** (15)
59	(Azerbaijan) Amit Guluzade	2015–2017	1 (35)	0 (5)	(-)	**1** (40)
59	(Azerbaijan) Nijat Mukhtarov	2016–2018	1 (35)	0 (3)	(-)	**1** (38)
59	(Azerbaijan) Sergey Chernyshev	2017	1 (9)	0 (0)	(-)	**1** (9)
59	(Azerbaijan) Ehtiram Shahverdiyev	2017–2019	1 (43)	0 (6)	(-)	**1** (49)
59	(Azerbaijan) Ali Babayev	2018–2019	1 (25)	0 (5)	(-)	**1** (30)
59	(Azerbaijan) Sertan Taşqın	2019–2020	1 (18)	0 (2)	(-)	**1** (20)
59	(Azerbaijan) **Sabuhi Abdullazade**	2017–Present	1 (76)	0 (4)	0 (3)	**1** (83)
59	(Iran) Saeid Bagherpasand	2021–2022	1 (11)	0 (0)	0 (0)	**1** (11)
59	(Azerbaijan) Hojjat Haghverdi	2021–2023	1 (40)	0 (7)	0 (2)	**1** (49)
59	(Azerbaijan) Anatoliy Nuriyev	2022	1 (5)	0 (0)	0 (-)	**1** (5)
59	(Azerbaijan) **Elvin Badalov**	2019–Present	1 (72)	0 (11)	0 (3)	**1** (86)
59	(Azerbaijan) Vugar Beybalayev	2017–2018; 2021–2022	1 (35)	0 (5)	0 (-)	**1** (40)
59	(Ghana) **Richard Gadze**	2022–Present	1 (7)	0 (1)	0 (-)	**1** (8)
59	(Azerbaijan) **Rufat Abdullazade**	2017–Present	1 (60)	0 (8)	0 (3)	**1** (71)
59	(Cape Verde) **Steven Pereira**	2022–Present	1 (13)	0 (1)	0 (-)	**1** 14)

=== Internationals ===
As of 21 February 2023

This is a list of all full international footballers to play for Sumgayit FK. Players who were capped while a Sumgayit player are marked in bold. Players who gained their first International cap after leaving Sumgayit are not included.

==== Current players ====
Player	Nation	Caps	Goals	International years	Sumgayit years
Vurğun Hüseynov	Azerbaijan	15	1	2010-2013	2013–Present
**Elvin Badalov**	Azerbaijan	8	0	2020–Present	2019–Present
**Murad Khachayev**	Azerbaijan	1	0	2021–Present	2019–Present
Vugar Mustafayev	Azerbaijan	1	0	2016–Present	2019–Present
Vusal Isgandarli	Azerbaijan	3	0	2016–Present	2022–Present
Steven Pereira	Cape Verde	10	0	2017–Present	2022–Present
Richard Gadze	Ghana	1	0	2013–Present	2022–Present
Terrence Tisdell	Liberia	13	1	2016–Present	2022–Present
Todor Todoroski	North Macedonia	6	0	2021–Present	2022–Present

==== Former players ====
Player	Nation	Caps	Goals	International years	Sumgayit years
Samir Abbasov	Azerbaijan	46	0	2004-2010	2011–2014
**Haji Ahmadov**	Azerbaijan	1	0	2012	2011–2012
**Badavi Guseynov**	Azerbaijan	64	1	2012-	2011–2012
Rashad Karimov	Azerbaijan	1	0	2007	2011–2012
Ruslan Majidov	Azerbaijan	1	0	2005	2011–2012
Mahmud Qurbanov	Azerbaijan	39	1	1994-2008	2011–2012
Andrey Popovich	Azerbaijan	2	0	2011-2012	2011–2012, 2014–2015, 2022
**Səlahət Ağayev**	Azerbaijan	21	0	2011-2012	2012–2013, 2016
**Pardis Fardjad-Azad**	Azerbaijan	5	0	2013-2014	2012–2016
Aftandil Hacıyev	Azerbaijan	24	0	2000-2006	2012–013
Murad Hüseynov	Azerbaijan	4	0	2011	2012
Emin Jafarguliyev	Azerbaijan	1	0	2008	2012–2013
Jeyhun Sultanov	Azerbaijan	16	1	1998-2007	2012
Anar Nazirov	Azerbaijan	3	0	2013-2016	2013–2014
**Murad Agayev**	Azerbaijan	1	0	2012	2012–2013, 2014–2016
**Uğur Pamuk**	Azerbaijan	1	0	2012	2012–2013, 2014, 2015–2016
**Vugar Asgarov**	Azerbaijan	3	0	2012-2013	2013-2014
Aleksandr Chertoganov	Azerbaijan	52	0	2006-2012	2013–2016
Zaur Hashimov	Azerbaijan	19	0	1998-2007	2013
Nodar Mammadov	Azerbaijan	4	0	2007-2008	2013–2015
Ramazan Abbasov	Azerbaijan	9	0	2006-2007	2014
Farid Guliyev	Azerbaijan	7	1	2010	2014
**Magomed Kurbanov**	Azerbaijan	3	0	2015	2014–2017
**Khayal Najafov**	Azerbaijan	2	0	2020–Present	2014–2021
Ruslan Poladov	Azerbaijan	1	0	2005	2014–2015
**Aghabala Ramazanov**	Azerbaijan	18	1	2014–Present	2015–2016
Amit Guluzade	Azerbaijan	3	0	2010	2015–2017
**Amil Yunanov**	Azerbaijan	5	0	2016–Present	2015–2018, 2019–2020
Vagif Javadov	Azerbaijan	58	9	2006-2014	2016
Rasim Ramaldanov	Azerbaijan	17	0	2012-2014	2016
Rail Malikov	Azerbaijan	40	0	2004-2011	2016–2020
Farhad Valiyev	Azerbaijan	32	0	2006-2010	2016–2018
**Tural Akhundov**	Azerbaijan	2	0	2018–Present	2017–2018
**Rashad Eyyubov**	Azerbaijan	7	0	2015–Present	2017–2018
Javid Taghiyev	Azerbaijan	2	0	2015–Present	2017–2018
**Javid Imamverdiyev**	Azerbaijan	39	7	2014–Present	2017–2018, 2020–2021
**Ali Babayev**	Azerbaijan	1	0	2019	2018–2019
Afran Ismayilov	Azerbaijan	39	5	2010-2018	2018–2019
Elvin Mammadov	Azerbaijan	39	7	2008-2017	2018–2019, 2020-2022
Ilgar Gurbanov	Azerbaijan	30	1	2004-2018	2019–2020
**Ragim Sadykhov**	Azerbaijan	9	0	2020–Present	2019-2022
Mehdi Sharifi	Iran	3	0	2014–Present	2019–2020
**Tellur Mutallimov**	Azerbaijan	7	0	2017–Present	2020-2022
**Ali Ghorbani**	Azerbaijan	8	0	2020–Present	2020-2022
**Hojjat Haghverdi**	Azerbaijan	17	1	2021–Present	2021-2023
**Araz Abdullayev**	Azerbaijan	44	3	2008–Present	2022
**Anatoliy Nuriyev**	Azerbaijan	13	1	2021–Present	2022

== Team ==
=== Record wins ===
- Record win: 4–0

v Turan Tovuz, 2012–13 Azerbaijan Premier League, 11 March 2013

- Record League win: 4–0

v Turan Tovuz, 2012–13 Azerbaijan Premier League, 11 March 2013

- Record Azerbaijan Cup win: 2–0

v Lokomotiv-Bilajary, 26 October 2011

- Record away win: 2–3

v Ravan Baku, 2012–13, 16 December 2012

- Record home win 4–0

v Turan Tovuz, 2012–13 Azerbaijan Premier League, 11 March 2013

=== Record defeats ===
- Record defeat: 1–8

v Neftchi Baku, 2012-13 Azerbaijan Premier League, 17 November 2012

- Record League defeat: 1–8

v Neftchi Baku, 2012-13 Azerbaijan Premier League, 17 November 2012

- Record away defeat: 1–8

v Neftchi Baku, 2012-13 Azerbaijan Premier League, 17 November 2012

- Record Azerbaijan Cup defeat: 0–3

v Qarabağ, 2011-12 Azerbaijan Cup, 30 November 2011

- Record home defeat: 1–6

v Qarabağ, 2012-13 Azerbaijan Premier League, 19 August 2012

=== Wins/draws/losses in a season ===
- Most wins in a league season: 9 – 2012–13
- Most draws in a league season: 8 – 2012–13
- Most defeats in a league season: 20 – 2011-12
- Fewest wins in a league season: 6 – 2011-12
- Fewest draws in a league season: 6 – 2011-12
- Fewest defeats in a league season: 15 – 2012–13

=== Goals ===
- Most League goals scored in a season: 32 – 2012–13
- Most Premier League goals scored in a season: 31 – 2012–13
- Fewest League goals scored in a season: 29 – 2011–12
- Most League goals conceded in a season: 52 – 2011–12
- Fewest League goals conceded in a season: 49 – 2012–13

=== Points ===
- Most points in a season:

35 in 32 matches, Azerbaijan Premier League, 2012-13

- Fewest points in a season:

24 in 32 matches, Azerbaijan Premier League, 2011-12
