= List of Azerbaijan football transfers winter 2022–23 =

This is a list of Azerbaijan football transfers in the winter transfer window, by club. Only clubs of the 2022–23 Azerbaijan Premier League are included.

== Azerbaijan Premier League 2022-23 ==
=== Gabala ===
In: Note: Flags indicate national team as defined under FIFA eligibility rules; some limited exceptions apply. Players may hold more than one non-FIFA nationality.

No.	Pos.	Nation	Player
9	MF	MAR	Ayyoub Allach (from (Belgium) Virton)

Out: Note: Flags indicate national team as defined under FIFA eligibility rules; some limited exceptions apply. Players may hold more than one non-FIFA nationality.

No.	Pos.	Nation	Player

=== Kapaz ===
In: Note: Flags indicate national team as defined under FIFA eligibility rules; some limited exceptions apply. Players may hold more than one non-FIFA nationality.

No.	Pos.	Nation	Player
3	DF	AZE	Abdulla Rzayev (on loan from (Azerbaijan) Sabah)
5	MF	AZE	Idris Ingilabli (on loan from (Azerbaijan) Sabah)
10	FW	FRA	Salif Cissé (from (Lithuania) Hegelmann)
21	MF	BRA	Martins Júnior (from (Lithuania) Babrungas Plungė)
68	GK	AZE	Elgün Bayramov (from (Azerbaijan) MOIK Baku)
71	GK	CRO	Mario Mustapic (Free agent)

Out: Note: Flags indicate national team as defined under FIFA eligibility rules; some limited exceptions apply. Players may hold more than one non-FIFA nationality.

No.	Pos.	Nation	Player
5	DF	IRN	Peyman Keshavarzi
10	MF	AZE	Ali Samadov (to (Azerbaijan) Shamakhi)
11	FW	AZE	Rauf Aliyev (Retired)
22	MF	AZE	Afran Ismayilov (Retired)
24	FW	GEO	Mikheil Ergemlidze (to (North Macedonia) Akademija Pandev)
29	DF	RUS	Rinat Guseynov
72	DF	AZE	Zahid Mardanov (to (Azerbaijan) Shamakhi)

=== Neftçi ===
In: Note: Flags indicate national team as defined under FIFA eligibility rules; some limited exceptions apply. Players may hold more than one non-FIFA nationality.

No.	Pos.	Nation	Player
3	DF	AZE	Hojjat Haghverdi (from (Azerbaijan) Sumgayit)
9	FW	BRA	Saldanha (on loan from (Japan) JEF United)
22	FW	FRA	Keelan Lebon (from (Kazakhstan) Astana)

Out: Note: Flags indicate national team as defined under FIFA eligibility rules; some limited exceptions apply. Players may hold more than one non-FIFA nationality.

No.	Pos.	Nation	Player
3	DF	SEN	Mamadou Mbodj (to (Kazakhstan) Ordabasy)
11	FW	GHA	Godsway Donyoh (to (Cyprus) Apollon Limassol)
16	MF	BRA	Guilherme Pato (to (Brazil) Figueirense)
24	MF	NGA	Yusuf Lawal (to (Portugal) Arouca)
73	MF	AZE	Ramin Nasirli (loan to (Latvia) Daugavpils)

=== Qarabağ ===
In: Note: Flags indicate national team as defined under FIFA eligibility rules; some limited exceptions apply. Players may hold more than one non-FIFA nationality.

No.	Pos.	Nation	Player
7	MF	ALG	Yassine Benzia (from (France) Dijon)
87	FW	FRA	Adama Diakhaby (Free agent)
99	FW	ALB	Redon Xhixha (from (Albania) Tirana)

Out: Note: Flags indicate national team as defined under FIFA eligibility rules; some limited exceptions apply. Players may hold more than one non-FIFA nationality.

No.	Pos.	Nation	Player
11	FW	GHA	Owusu Kwabena (to (Hungary) Ferencváros)
20	MF	BRA	Kady (to (Russia) Krasnodar)

=== Sabah ===
In: Note: Flags indicate national team as defined under FIFA eligibility rules; some limited exceptions apply. Players may hold more than one non-FIFA nationality.

No.	Pos.	Nation	Player

Out: Note: Flags indicate national team as defined under FIFA eligibility rules; some limited exceptions apply. Players may hold more than one non-FIFA nationality.

No.	Pos.	Nation	Player
1	GK	BLR	Alyaksandr Nyachayew (to (Belarus) Minsk)
5	MF	AZE	Idris Ingilabli (on loan to (Azerbaijan) Kapaz)
6	MF	AZE	Abdulla Khaybulayev (on loan to (Georgia (country)) Samtredia)
—	DF	AZE	Abdulla Rzayev (on loan to (Azerbaijan) Kapaz, previously on loan to (Azerbaijan) Shamakhi)
—	DF	BRA	Higor Gabriel (on loan to (Ukraine) Lviv, previously on loan to (Belarus) Dinamo Minsk)

=== Sabail ===
In: Note: Flags indicate national team as defined under FIFA eligibility rules; some limited exceptions apply. Players may hold more than one non-FIFA nationality.

No.	Pos.	Nation	Player
2	DF	AZE	Adil Naghiyev (loan return from (Azerbaijan) Shamakhi)
20	DF	AZE	Mirali Ahmadov (from (Azerbaijan) Shamakhi)
88	MF	SRB	Matija Ljujić (from (Hungary) Újpest)
99	FW	GNB	David Gomis (from (France) Pau)
96	MF	AZE	Ilkin Muradov (on loan from (Azerbaijan) Zira)

Out: Note: Flags indicate national team as defined under FIFA eligibility rules; some limited exceptions apply. Players may hold more than one non-FIFA nationality.

No.	Pos.	Nation	Player
20	MF	ARG	Facundo Cardozo (to (Argentina) Arsenal de Sarandí)
72	MF	AZE	Emin Zamanov (to (Azerbaijan) Shamakhi)

=== Shamakhi ===
In: Note: Flags indicate national team as defined under FIFA eligibility rules; some limited exceptions apply. Players may hold more than one non-FIFA nationality.

No.	Pos.	Nation	Player
15	MF	AZE	Emin Zamanov (from (Azerbaijan) Sabail)
29	MF	AZE	Ramin Ahmedov (from (Azerbaijan) Zira)
80	DF	AZE	Zahid Mardanov (from (Azerbaijan) Kapaz)
90	MF	AZE	Ali Samadov (from (Azerbaijan) Kapaz)

Out: Note: Flags indicate national team as defined under FIFA eligibility rules; some limited exceptions apply. Players may hold more than one non-FIFA nationality.

No.	Pos.	Nation	Player
13	DF	AZE	Parviz Azadov (to (Azerbaijan) Zira)
14	FW	AZE	Ugur Jahangirov
30	DF	AZE	Mirali Ahmadov (to (Azerbaijan) Sabail)
33	DF	AZE	Abdulla Rzayev (loan return to (Azerbaijan) Sabah)
55	DF	AZE	Adil Naghiyev (loan return to (Azerbaijan) Sabail)
77	MF	AZE	Samir Gurbanov
88	MF	AZE	Bahruz Teymurov (to (Azerbaijan) Zagatala)

=== Sumgayit ===
In: Note: Flags indicate national team as defined under FIFA eligibility rules; some limited exceptions apply. Players may hold more than one non-FIFA nationality.

No.	Pos.	Nation	Player
7	FW	LBR	Terrence Tisdell (from (Romania) Botoșani)
9	FW	GHA	Karim Abubakar (from (Israel) Bnei Yehuda)
22	MF	BRA	Diego Carioca (on loan from (Ukraine) Kolos Kovalivka)
23	FW	AZE	Kamran Aliyev (from (Russia) Arsenal Tula)
71	MF	JPN	Masaki Murata (from (Latvia) Valmiera)

Out: Note: Flags indicate national team as defined under FIFA eligibility rules; some limited exceptions apply. Players may hold more than one non-FIFA nationality.

No.	Pos.	Nation	Player
7	MF	AZE	Araz Abdullayev
9	FW	BIH	Almir Aganspahić (loan return to (Serbia) Čukarički)
15	MF	AZE	Vugar Beybalayev
22	DF	SRB	Damjan Daničić (to (Serbia) Voždovac)
23	MF	KAZ	Rifat Nurmugamet (to (Kazakhstan) Turan)
30	MF	POR	Filipe Chaby (to (Portugal) Belenenses)
70	FW	TOG	Ouro-Nile Toure
—	DF	AZE	Hojjat Haghverdi (to (Azerbaijan) Neftçi, previously on loan to (Iran) Tractor)

=== Turan-Tovuz ===
In: Note: Flags indicate national team as defined under FIFA eligibility rules; some limited exceptions apply. Players may hold more than one non-FIFA nationality.

No.	Pos.	Nation	Player
2	DF	PAN	Roderick Miller (from (Iraq) Al-Minaa)
9	FW	ALB	Belajdi Pusi (from (Albania) Skënderbeu Korçë)
25	DF	MDA	Denis Marandici (from (Bosnia and Herzegovina) Zrinjski Mostar)

Out: Note: Flags indicate national team as defined under FIFA eligibility rules; some limited exceptions apply. Players may hold more than one non-FIFA nationality.

No.	Pos.	Nation	Player
9	FW	GEO	Imeda Ashortia

=== Zira ===
In: Note: Flags indicate national team as defined under FIFA eligibility rules; some limited exceptions apply. Players may hold more than one non-FIFA nationality.

No.	Pos.	Nation	Player
6	MF	UKR	Eldar Kuliyev (from (Ukraine) Mynai)
19	FW	UKR	Vladyslav Kulach (from (Ukraine) Dynamo Kyiv)
28	MF	NGA	Abbas Ibrahim (from (Portugal) Paços de Ferreira)
66	DF	AZE	Parviz Azadov (from (Azerbaijan) Shamakhi)
70	MF	NIG	Issa Djibrilla (Free agent)
96	MF	HAI	Wilde-Donald Guerrier (from (Cyprus) Olympiakos Nicosia)

Out: Note: Flags indicate national team as defined under FIFA eligibility rules; some limited exceptions apply. Players may hold more than one non-FIFA nationality.

No.	Pos.	Nation	Player
8	MF	AZE	Ilkin Muradov (on loan to (Azerbaijan) Sabail)
13	MF	AZE	Ramin Ahmedov (to (Azerbaijan) Shamakhi)
19	DF	AZE	Tamkin Khalilzade
