= 2022–23 Azerbaijan Premier League =

Azerbaijan Premier League
- Season: 2022–23
- Dates: 6 August 2022 – 28 May 2023
- Champions: Qarabağ
- Relegated: Shamakhi
- Champions League: Qarabağ
- Europa Conference League: Sabah; Neftçi; Gabala
- Matches: 180
- Goals: 475 (2.64 per match)
- Top goalscorer: Ramil Sheydayev (22 goals)
- Biggest home win: Sabah 5-0 Kapaz (9 October 2022)
- Biggest away win: Zira 1-7 Qarabağ (18 September 2022); Sumgayit 0-6 Sabah (23 December 2022)
- Highest scoring: Zira 1-7 Qarabağ (18 September 2022)
- Longest winning run: Qarabağ (13 games)
- Longest unbeaten run: Qarabağ (29 games)
- Longest winless run: Sumgayit (15 games)
- Longest losing run: Sabail (8 games)
- Highest attendance: 10,000; Sabah 0–0 Qarabağ (13 November 2022)
- Lowest attendance: 24; Gabala 1-0 Zira (5 November 2022)
- Total attendance: 265,144
- Average attendance: 1,473
- All statistics correct as of 29 May 2023.

The 2022–23 Azerbaijan Premier League was the 31st season of the Azerbaijan Premier League, the highest tier football league of Azerbaijan. The season begun on 6 August 2022 and ended 28 May 2023.

== Teams ==
Locations of the 2022–23 Azerbaijan Premier League teams.
Team in italics is from a zone of the Nagorno-Karabakh conflict and is playing its home games in Baku.

=== Stadia and locations ===
Note: Table lists in alphabetical order.

Team	Year Established	Location	Venue	Capacity
Gabala	1995	Qabala	Gabala City Stadium	4,500
Kapaz	1959	Ganja	Ganja City Stadium	27,000
Neftchi	1937	Baku	Bakcell Arena	11,000
Qarabağ	1951	Aghdam	Azersun Arena	5,200
Sabah	2017	Absheron, Baku	Bank Respublika Arena	13,000
Sabail	2016	Sabail, Baku	Bayil Arena	3,200
Shamakhi	1997	Shamakhi	Shamakhi City Stadium	2,200
Sumgayit	2010	Sumgait	Kapital Bank Arena	1,400
Turan Tovuz	1992	Tovuz	Tovuz City Stadium	6,800
Zira	2014	Zira, Baku	Zira Olympic Sport Complex Stadium	1,300

=== Stadiums ===
Gabala	Kapaz	Qarabağ	Neftçi	Sabah
Gabala City Stadium	Ganja City Stadium	Azersun Arena	Bakcell Arena	Bank Respublika Arena
Capacity: **4,500**	Capacity: **27,000**	Capacity: **5,200**	Capacity: **10,200**	Capacity: **13,000**
Sabail	Shamakhi	Sumgayit	Turan Tovuz	Zira
ASCO Arena	Shamakhi City Stadium	Kapital Bank Arena	Tovuz City Stadium	Zira Olympic Sport Complex Stadium
Capacity: **3,200**	Capacity: **2,200**	Capacity: **1,400**	Capacity: **6,800**	Capacity: **1,300**

=== Personnel and kits ===
Note: Flags indicate national team as has been defined under FIFA eligibility rules. Players and managers may hold more than one non-FIFA nationality.

Team	President	Manager	Captain	Kit manufacturer	Shirt sponsor
Gabala	(Azerbaijan) Fariz Najafov	(Azerbaijan) Elmar Bakhshiyev	(Azerbaijan) Asif Mammadov	(Spain) Joma	Gilan & Knauf
Kapaz	(Azerbaijan) Ilgar Nadiri	(Azerbaijan) Tarlan Ahmadov	(Azerbaijan) Tural Akhundov	(Spain) Joma	-
Neftçi	(Azerbaijan) Kamran Guliyev	(Romania) Laurențiu Reghecampf	(Azerbaijan) Emin Mahmudov	(United States) Nike	Turkish Airlines
Qarabağ	(Turkey) Abdolbari Gozal	(Azerbaijan) Gurban Gurbanov	(Azerbaijan) Maksim Medvedev	(Azerbaijan) Il’Azero	Azersun
Sabah	(Azerbaijan) Magsud Adigozalov	(Russia) Murad Musayev	(Azerbaijan) Elvin Jamalov	(United States) Nike	Bank Respublika
Sabail	(Azerbaijan) Abdulgani Nurmammadov	(Azerbaijan) Shahin Diniyev	(Azerbaijan) Rahid Amirguliyev	(Germany) Jako	ASCO
Shamakhi	(Azerbaijan) Elchin Usub	(Azerbaijan) Vugar Asgarli	(Azerbaijan) Elvin Mammadov	(Spain) Joma	-
Sumgayit	(Azerbaijan) Riad Rafiyev	(Azerbaijan) Samir Abbasov	(Azerbaijan) Vurğun Hüseynov	(Germany) Jako	Pasha Insurance, Azərikimya
Turan Tovuz	(Azerbaijan) Ogtay Abdullayev	(Azerbaijan) Aykhan Abbasov	(Azerbaijan) Şehriyar Aliyev	(Germany) Jako	-
Zira	(Azerbaijan) Taleh Nasibov	(Azerbaijan) Rashad Sadygov	(Azerbaijan) Qismət Alıyev	(Spain) Joma	Nar, Azfargroup

=== Managerial changes ===
Team	Outgoing manager	Manner of departure	Date of vacancy	Position in table	Incoming manager	Date of appointment
Sabail	(Azerbaijan) Aftandil Hacıyev	23 May 2022	Mutual termination	Pre-season	(Azerbaijan) Mahmud Qurbanov	26 May 2022
Neftçi	(Azerbaijan) Samir Abbasov	10 June 2022	End of contract	Pre-season	(Romania) Laurențiu Reghecampf	21 June 2022
Sumgayit	(Belarus) Alyaksey Baha	21 September 2022	Mutual termination	8th	(Azerbaijan) Samir Abbasov	26 September 2022
Sabail	(Azerbaijan) Mahmud Qurbanov	28 December 2022	Resigned	10th	(Azerbaijan) Shahin Diniyev	29 December 2022

=== Foreign players ===
Each team could use only seven foreign players on the field in each game.

Club	Player 1	Player 2	Player 3	Player 4	Player 5	Player 6	Player 7	Player 8	Player 9	Player 10	Player 11	Player 12	Player 13	Left during the season
Gabala	(Albania) Isnik Alimi	(Brazil) Ramon	(Brazil) Ruan	(Brazil) Felipe	(Brazil) Alemão	(Cameroon) Christophe Atangana	(Israel) Fares Abu Akel	(Jordan) **Omar Hani**	(Togo) Yaovi Akakpo	(Ukraine) Andriy Stryzhak	(Morocco) Ayyoub Allach			
Kapaz	(Belarus) Yegor Khvalko	(Brazil) Juninho Maranhense	(Croatia) Mario Mustapic	(France) Salif Cissé	(Georgia (country)) Giorgi Kantaria	(Georgia (country)) Mate Kvirkvia	(Nigeria) Ahmed Isaiah	(Nigeria) Abdullahi Shuaibu						(Georgia (country)) Mikheil Ergemlidze (Iran) Peyman Keshavarzi (Russia) Rinat Guseynov
Neftçi	(Belarus) **Yegor Bogomolsky**	(Brazil) Saldanha	(Croatia) Ivan Brkić	(France) Keelan Lebon	(Georgia (country)) **Vato Arveladze**	(Georgia (country)) **Solomon Kvirkvelia**	(Israel) Ataa Jaber	(Paraguay) César Meza	(Russia) Azer Aliyev	(Serbia) **Vojislav Stanković**	(United States) **Kenny Saief**			(Brazil) Guilherme Pato (Ghana) Godsway Donyoh (Nigeria) Yusuf Lawal (Senegal) Mamadou Mbodj
Qarabağ	(Albania) **Redon Xhixha**	(Algeria) **Yassine Benzia**	(Brazil) Júlio Romão	(Cape Verde) **Leandro Andrade**	(Colombia) Kevin Medina	(France) Adama Diakhaby	(France) Abdellah Zoubir	(Georgia (country)) **Luka Gugeshashvili**	(Montenegro) **Marko Janković**	(Montenegro) **Marko Vešović**				(Brazil) Kady (Ghana) **Owusu Kwabena** (Senegal) Ibrahima Wadji
Sabah	(Bosnia and Herzegovina) Bojan Letić	(Brazil) Christian	(Georgia (country)) **Davit Volkovi**	(Germany) Joy-Lance Mickels	(Nigeria) Emmanuel Apeh	(Senegal) **Abdoulaye Ba**	(Spain) Cristian Ceballos	(Spain) Jon Irazabal	(Ukraine) Zurab Ochihava	(Ukraine) Oleksiy Kashchuk				(Belarus) Alyaksandr Nyachayew (Ivory Coast) Tiemoko Fofana
Sabail	(Argentina) Franco Mazurek	(Bulgaria) Emil Martinov	(Brazil) França	(Guinea-Bissau) **David Gomis**	(Ivory Coast) Goba Zakpa	(Serbia) Matija Ljujić	(Uganda) **Luwagga Kizito**	(Ukraine) Maksym Chekh	(Ukraine) Petro Stasyuk					(Argentina) Facundo Cardozo
Shamakhi														
Sumgayit	(Brazil) Diego Carioca	(Cape Verde) **Steven Pereira**	(Ghana) Karim Abubakar	(Russia) Ilnur Valiev	(Japan) Masaki Murata	(Liberia) **Terrence Tisdell**	(North Macedonia) **Todor Todoroski**	(Mali) Alya Toure						(Bosnia and Herzegovina) Almir Aganspahić (Kazakhstan) Rifat Nurmugamet (Portugal) Filipe Chaby (Serbia) Damjan Daničić (Ghana) **Richard Gadze** (Togo) Ouro-Nile Toure
Turan Tovuz	(Albania) Belajdi Pusi	(Burkina Faso) Ben Aziz Dao	(Cameroon) Rooney Eva Wankewai	(Georgia (country)) Piruz Marakvelidze	(Moldova) **Denis Marandici**	(Nigeria) Nathan Oduwa	(Nigeria) Henry Okebugwu	(Panama) **Roderick Miller**	(Russia) Aykhan Guseynov	(South Africa) **Siyanda Xulu**	(Ghana) Divine Naah			(Georgia (country)) Imeda Ashortia
Zira	(Belgium) Loris Brogno	(Benin) **Moïse Adiléhou**	(Brazil) Filipe Pachtmann	(France) Hamidou Keyta	(Greece) Dimitrios Chantakias	(Guinea-Bissau) **Toni Gomes**	(Haiti) **Wilde-Donald Guerrier**	(Netherlands) Mo Hamdaoui	(Niger) **Issa Djibrilla**	(Nigeria) Abbas Ibrahim	(Serbia) Andrija Luković	(Ukraine) Vladyslav Kulach	(Ukraine) Eldar Kuliyev	(Serbia) Nemanja Anđelković

In bold: Players capped for their national team.

== League table ==
Pos	Team	Pld	W	D	L	GF	GA	GD	Pts	Qualification
1	Qarabağ (C)	36	28	6	2	91	25	+66	90	Qualification for the Champions League first qualifying round
2	Sabah	36	25	6	5	75	24	+51	81	Qualification to Europa Conference League second qualifying round
3	Neftçi	36	20	8	8	63	38	+25	68	Qualification to Europa Conference League second qualifying round
4	Gabala	36	13	11	12	47	47	0	50	Qualification to Europa Conference League second qualifying round
5	Zira	36	13	11	12	45	46	−1	50	
6	Turan Tovuz	36	10	9	17	36	49	−13	39	
7	Sumgayit	36	8	7	21	26	70	−44	31	
8	Kapaz	36	6	13	17	34	62	−28	31	
9	Sabail	36	7	8	21	32	62	−30	29	
10	Shamakhi (R)	36	4	13	19	26	52	−26	25	Relegation to Azerbaijan First Division

Source: Soccerway
Rules for classification: 1) Points; 2) Head-to-head points; 3) Head-to-head goal difference; 4) Head-to-head goals scored; 5) Head-to-head away goals scored (only if two teams); 6) Goal difference; 7) Goals scored.
(C) Champions; (R) Relegated

== Fixtures and results ==
Clubs played each other four times for a total of 36 matches each.

=== Matches 1–18 ===
Home \ Away	GAB	KAP	NEF	QAR	SAB	SEB	SHA	SUM	TUR	ZIR
Gabala		1–1	1–2	0–1	0–2	2–1	3–1	1–0	0–0	1–0
Kapaz	0–3		0–2	0–1	2–2	3–0	2–1	0–1	0–0	1–2
Neftçi	2–0	5–2		0–4	2–3	3–1	3–0	3–0	0–0	2–1
Qarabağ	1–0	3–1	3–1		4–3	3–1	4–0	3–1	3–0	0–0
Sabah	2–1	5–0	2–1	0–0		0–0	1–1	3–0	3–1	1–0
Sabail	1–2	4–1	0–2	0–3	0–2		0–0	1–0	0–1	1–2
Shamakhi	1–1	1–1	0–1	0–4	0–1	1–1		4–2	0–1	0–0
Sumgayit	1–1	0–0	2–2	0–2	0–6	2–0	1–1		0–0	0–2
Turan Tovuz	0–2	2–0	0–1	0–2	0–1	2–2	1–3	1–0		1–3
Zira	2–1	2–2	0–3	1–7	1–3	1–0	1–0	0–0	2–1	

Source: soccerway.com
Legend: Blue = home team win; Yellow = draw; Red = away team win.

=== Matches 19–36 ===
Home \ Away	GAB	KAP	NEF	QAR	SAB	SEB	SHA	SUM	TUR	ZIR
Gabala		1–1	0–0	1–3	0–3	4–2	2–0	2–1	1–2	2–1
Kapaz	2–2		1–3	1–1	0–3	1–0	3–2	0–1	1–0	1–1
Neftçi	1–2	2–2		2–4	1–0	3–0	1–1	2–0	4–0	1–0
Qarabağ	3–0	3–1	1–1		1–1	3–0	3–1	1–2	3–1	2–2
Sabah	3–2	2–0	2–0	2–1		4–0	1–0	4–0	0–2	0–0
Sabail	2–2	1–0	1–1	0–3	2–1		1–0	0–1	1–1	2–0
Shamakhi	0–0	1–1	0–1	0–1	2–1	2–1		0–0	0–1	0–3
Sumgayit	2–3	1–2	0–4	0–6	0–4	1–3	1–0		2–1	0–3
Turan Tovuz	1–1	2–0	4–0	2–3	0–2	2–2	1–1	2–3		0–2
Zira	2–2	1–1	1–1	0–1	0–2	3–1	2–2	3–1	1–3	

Source: soccerway.com
Legend: Blue = home team win; Yellow = draw; Red = away team win.

== Season statistics ==
=== Top scorers ===
As of match played 28 May 2023

Rank	Player	Club	Goals
1	(Azerbaijan) Ramil Sheydayev	Qarabağ	22
2	(Azerbaijan) Musa Gurbanli	Qarabağ	21
3	(Germany) Joy-Lance Mickels	Sabah	17
3	(Azerbaijan) Emin Mahmudov	Neftçi	17
5	(Ukraine) Oleksiy Kashchuk	Sabah	16
5	(Cameroon) Rooney Eva	Turan Tovuz	16
7	(Nigeria) Abdullahi Shuaibu	Kapaz	11
8	(Georgia (country)) Davit Volkovi	Sabah	10
9	(Albania) Isnik Alimi	Gabala	9
10	(France) Hamidou Keyta	Zira	8
10	(France) Abdellah Zoubir	Qarabağ	8
10	(Nigeria) Emmanuel Apeh	Sabah	8
10	(Brazil) Ramon	Gabala	8

=== Hat-tricks ===
Player	For	Against	Result	Date	Ref
(Azerbaijan) Musa Gurbanlı^{4}	Qarabağ	Zira	1–7	18 September 2022	
(Cameroon) Rooney Eva	Turan Tovuz	Neftçi	4–0	7 May 2023	

- ^{4} Player scored 4 goals

=== Clean sheets ===
As of matches played 28 May 2023

Rank	Player	Club	Clean sheets
1	(Azerbaijan) Yusif Imanov	Sabah	19
2	(Croatia) Ivan Brkić	Neftçi	13
3	(Azerbaijan) Tarlan Ahmadli	Turan Tovuz	10
4	(Azerbaijan) Shakhruddin Magomedaliyev	Qarabağ	9
4	(Georgia (country)) Luka Gugeshashvili	Qarabağ	9

== See also ==
- Azerbaijan Premier League
- Azerbaijan First Division
- Azerbaijan Cup
