= Carioca (disambiguation) =

Carioca is a name for the inhabitants of Rio de Janeiro.

Carioca may also refer to:

== People ==
- Tahiya Carioca (1925-1999), Egyptian actress and dancer
- Marcelinho Carioca (born 1971), born Marcelo Pereira Surcin, Brazilian football attacking midfielder
- Carioca (footballer, born 1974), born Alexander Antonio Viana, Brazilian football forward
- Jean Carioca (footballer, born 1978), born Jean da Silva Duarte, Brazilian football defender
- Carioca (footballer, born 1979), born Claudio Silva da Fonseca, Brazilian football midfielder
- Rafael Carioca (footballer, born 1986), born Rafael Felipe Barreto, Brazilian football midfielder
- Jean Carioca (footballer, born 1988), born Jean Agostinho da Silva, Brazilian football midfielder
- Rafael Carioca (born 1989), born Rafael de Souza Pereira, Brazilian football defensive midfielder
- Rafael Carioca (footballer, born 1992), born Rafael Bruno Cajueiro da Silva, Brazilian leftback
- Marquinhos Carioca (born 1992), born Marcus Vinícius Vidal Cunha, Brazilian football winger
- Diego Carioca (born 1998), born Diego Silva Nascimento Santos, Brazilian football midfielder
- Elias Carioca (born 1999), born Elias Rezende de Oliveira, Brazilian football forward

== Music ==
- Os Cariocas, a Brazilian popular music group
- "Carioca" (1933 song), a song and a dance from the 1933 film Flying Down to Rio
- Carioca (Raphael Gualazzi song), 2020

== Places ==
- Carioca/Sugar Loaf field, a Brazilian oil field
- Carioca Aqueduct, an 18th-century Aqueduct in Rio
- Carioca River, in Rio de Janeiro state
- Carioca Station, a station on the Rio de Janeiro Metro

== Others ==
- Carioca (food) (also known as pinakufu or paborot), fried dessert from the Philippines made from glazed ground glutinous rice balls
- Volvo PV 36 Carioca
- José Carioca, a Disney character
- Carioca (card game), a card game similar to rummy style games
- Campeonato Carioca, a Brazilian state football league
