= Jean Carioca =

Jean Carioca may refer to:

- Jean Carioca (footballer, born 1978) (Jean da Silva Duarte), Brazilian football defender
- Jean Carioca (footballer, born 1988) (Jean Agostinho da Silva), Brazilian football midfielder
