= Ibrahim Aliyev =

Azerbaijani footballer (born 1999)

Personal information
- Full name: Ibrahim Fariz oglu Aliyev
- Date of birth: 17 July 1999 (age 27)
- Place of birth: Baku, Azerbaijan
- Height: 1.80 m (5 ft 11 in)
- Position: Striker

Team information
- Current team: Shafa
- Number: 9

Senior career*
Years	Team	Apps	(Gls)
2016–2017	Neftçi Baku	2	(0)
2017–2018	Qarabağ	0	(0)
2019	Sumgayit	2	(0)
2020	Neftçi Baku	0	(0)
2021	Turan Tovuz		
2021–2022	Zagatala	1	(2)
2022–2023	Sumgayit	5	(0)
2023	MOIK	1	(1)
2023–2024	Irevan FK	1	(1)
2024	Imishli FK	2	(2)
2024–2025	MOIK	9	(11)
2025–2026	Imishli FK	9	(0)
2026–	Shafa	0	(0)

International career
2017	Azerbaijan U19	3	(0)
- * Club domestic league appearances and goals as of 17 January 2026

Ibrahim Aliyev (Azerbaijani: İbrahim Əliyev; born 17 July 1999) is an Azerbaijani footballer who plays as a striker for Shafa FK in the Azerbaijan First League.

== Club career ==
On 5 November 2016, Aliyev made his debut in the Azerbaijan Premier League for Neftçi Baku match against Keşla.

On 17 January 2026, Azerbaijan First League club Shafa signed a 5+1-year contract with Aliyev.
