= Carioca (footballer, born 1979) =

Brazilian footballer

Personal information
- Full name: Cláudio Silva da Fonseca
- Date of birth: 3 November 1979 (age 46)
- Place of birth: Rio Bonito, Rio de Janeiro, Brazil
- Position: Defensive midfielder

Youth career
- 1994: Vasco da Gama
- 1995: Fluminense
- 1996: Bragantino
- 1997: Osasco
- 1998: Corinthians

Senior career*
Years	Team	Apps	(Gls)
1999	São Caetano		
1999	Juventus-SP		
2000	Coquimbo Unido	26	(1)
2001	Deportivo Italchacao		
2002	America-RJ		
2003	Rangers	28	(3)
2004	Deportivo Táchira	9	(0)
2004–2005	Caracas	13	(0)
2006	Estoril		
2007	Rangers	9	(1)
2008–2010	Unión La Calera	63	(4)
2013	São Gonçalo-RJ		
2014	Gonçalense-RJ	1	(0)
2015	Araioses		
- * Club domestic league appearances and goals

Cláudio Silva da Fonseca (born 3 November 1979), kwown as Carioca, is a Brazilian former footballer who played as a defensive midfielder for clubs in Brazil, Chile and Venezuela.

== Career ==
A midfielder, Carioca was trained at clubs such as Fluminense, Corinthians, São Caetano, among others.

In 2000, Carioca moved to Chile to play for Coquimbo Unido in the top division coinciding with his countryman André. In that country, he also played for Rangers de Talca in 2003 and 2007 and Unión La Calera in 2008–2010. In 2010, he helped Unión La Calera to get promotion to the 2011 Primera División after 24 years.

Carioca also stood out in Venezuela playing for Deportivo Italchacao, Deportivo Táchira and Caracas. He competed at the 2001 Copa Merconorte with Deportivo Italchacao and at the 2004 Copa Libertadores with Deportivo Táchira.

Back to Brazil, Carioca played for clubs at minor categories like São Gonçalo FC.
