= Suleyman Ahmadov =

Azerbaijani footballer (born 1999)

Personal information
- Full name: Suleyman Vugar oglu Ahmadov
- Date of birth: 25 November 1999 (age 26)
- Place of birth: Sumgayit, Azerbaijan
- Height: 1.68 m (5 ft 6 in)
- Position: Midfielder

Team information
- Current team: Karvan
- Number: 17

Youth career
- Keşla

Senior career*
Years	Team	Apps	(Gls)
2016–2023	Sumgayit	87	(1)
2017	→ Qarabağ (loan)	0	(0)
2023–2025	Sabail	37	(0)
2025–	Karvan	6	(0)

International career^{‡}
2016	Azerbaijan U17	3	(0)
2017	Azerbaijan U19	3	(0)
2019–2020	Azerbaijan U21	5	(0)
- * Club domestic league appearances and goals as of 22 June 2026 ‡ National team caps and goals as of 21 September 2020

Suleyman Ahmadov (Azerbaijani: Süleyman Əhmədov; born on 25 November 1999) is an Azerbaijani professional footballer who plays as a midfielder for Karvan in the Azerbaijan Premier League.

== Career ==
=== Club ===
On 20 November 2016, Ahmadov made his debut in the Azerbaijan Premier League for Sumgayit match against Neftçi Baku.
