= Zahid Mardanov =

Azerbaijani footballer (born 2000)

Personal information
- Full name: Zahid Khalig oglu Mardanov
- Date of birth: 9 August 2000 (age 26)
- Place of birth: Azerbaijan
- Height: 1.84 m (6 ft 0 in)
- Position: Defender

Team information
- Current team: Shafa Baku
- Number: 80

Senior career*
Years	Team	Apps	(Gls)
2018–2020	Sabah	1	(0)
2020–2021	Kapaz	0	(0)
2021–2022	Zira 2	0	(0)
2022	Kapaz	1	(0)
2023–2025	Shamakhi	14	(0)
2025–	Shafa Baku	11	(1)

International career
2018–2019	Azerbaijan U19	4	(1)
- * Club domestic league appearances and goals as of 25 December 2025

Zahid Mardanov (Azerbaijani: Zahid Mərdanov; born 9 August 2000) is an Azerbaijani footballer who plays as a defender for Shafa Baku in the Azerbaijan First League.

== Club career ==
On 11 May 2019, Mardanov made his debut in the Azerbaijan Premier League for Sabah match against Zira.
