= Firas Abu Akel =

Israeli footballer

Fares Abu Akel
Personal information
- Full name: Fares Abu Akel
- Date of birth: 8 February 1997 (age 29)
- Place of birth: Umm al-Fahm, Israel
- Height: 1.77 m (5 ft 10 in)
- Position: Midfielder

Team information
- Current team: Ironi Tiberias

Senior career*
Years	Team	Apps	(Gls)
2017–2018	Hapoel Umm al-Fahm	28	(1)
2018–2019	Hapoel Iksal	29	(0)
2019–2022	Ashdod	82	(0)
2022–2024	Gabala	37	(2)
2024–2025	Ironi Tiberias	31	(1)
2025	Maccabi Bnei Reineh	4	(0)
2025	Ironi Tiberias	27	(0)
- * Club domestic league appearances and goals as of 24 June 2026

Fares Abu Akel (Hebrew: פיראס אבו עקל; born 8 February 1997) is an Israeli footballer who plays as a midfielder, most recently for Ironi Tiberias in the Israeli Premier League.

== Club career ==
On 8 August 2022, Abu Akel made his debut in the Azerbaijan Premier League for Gabala match against Turan Tovuz.

== Career statistics ==
=== Club ===
As of match played 1 June 2024

Appearances and goals by club, season and competition
Club	Season	League			National Cup		League Cup		Continental		Other		Total	
Club	Season	Division	Apps	Goals	Apps	Goals	Apps	Goals	Apps	Goals	Apps	Goals	Apps	Goals
Hapoel Umm al-Fahm	2017–18	Liga Alef	28	1	1	0	0	0	-		-		29	1
Hapoel Iksal	2018–19	Liga Leumit	29	0	2	0	1	0	-		-		32	0
Ashdod	2019–20	Israeli Premier League	25	0	1	0	5	0	-		-		31	0
Ashdod	2020–21	Israeli Premier League	29	0	3	0	3	0	-		-		35	0
Ashdod	2021–22	Israeli Premier League	28	0	1	0	2	0	2	0	-		33	0
Ashdod	Total		82	0	5	0	10	0	2	0	-	-	99	0
Gabala	2022–23	Azerbaijan Premier League	31	2	5	0	-		2	0	-		38	2
Gabala	2023–24	Azerbaijan Premier League	6	0	3	1	-		0	0	-		9	1
Gabala	Total		37	2	8	1	-	-	2	0	-	-	47	3
Ironi Tiberias	2024–25	Israeli Premier League	31	1	0	0	-		0	0	-		31	1
Ironi Tiberias	Total		31	1	0	0	-	-	0	0	-	-	31	1
Maccabi Bnei Reineh	2025–26	Israeli Premier League	0	0	0	0	-		0	0	-		0	0
Maccabi Bnei Reineh	Total		0	0	0	0	-	-	0	0	-	-	0	0
Career total			207	4	16	1	11	0	4	0	-	-	238	5
