= Richard Gadze =

Ghanaian footballer (born 1994)

Personal information
- Date of birth: 23 August 1994 (age 32)
- Place of birth: Accra, Ghana
- Height: 1.76 m (5 ft 9 in)
- Position: Forward

Senior career*
Years	Team	Apps	(Gls)
2012–2015	Ebusua Dwarfs	12	(3)
2015–2017	Delhi Dynamos	28	(9)
2016	→ HJK (loan)	14	(0)
2017	→ Zira (loan)	12	(3)
2017–2018	Zira	23	(7)
2018–2019	Voluntari	28	(6)
2019–2020	Zira	11	(3)
2020–2021	Sheriff Tiraspol	18	(5)
2021	Bnei Sakhnin	0	(0)
2022	Sheikh Russel	11	(3)
2022–2023	Sumgayit	7	(1)
2023–2024	Rajasthan United	9	(0)
2024	Paro	17	(27)
2024–2025	Persiku Kudus	10	(2)

International career
2013	Ghana U23	2	(1)
2013	Ghana	1	(0)
- * Club domestic league appearances and goals as of 25 February 2025

Richard Gadze (born 23 August 1994) is a Ghanaian professional footballer who plays as a forward.

== Club career ==
=== Earlier career ===
Gadze played for several Ghanaian teams, including Ebusua Dwarfs, before signing for Indian Super League club Delhi Dynamos in September 2015. Gadze scored his first goal for Delhi Dynamos in their 2–1 victory over Pune City on 14 October 2015.

==== HJK ====
On 25 January 2016, Gadze signed for Veikkausliiga side Helsingin Jalkapalloklubi on loan, returning to Delhi Dynamos on 7 September 2016.

==== Zira ====
On 1 February 2017, Zira FK of the Azerbaijan Premier League announced the signing of Gadze on a half year contract. Zira announced on 30 May 2017, that Gadze had signed a new one-year contract, with the option of an additional year. Zira declined to take up the option of the second year of Gadze's contract, with him leaving Zira at the end of the 2017–18 season.

==== Zira return ====
In October 2019, Gadze returned to Zira FK on a one-year contract.

==== Sheriff Tiraspol ====
On 7 August 2020, Gadze signed a contract with Sheriff Tiraspol.

==== Sumgayit ====
On 27 October 2022, Gadze signed for Azerbaijan Premier League club Sumgayit on a contract until the end of the 2023–24 season. He scored against "Neftchi" in the first game.

==== Rajasthan United ====
In September 2023, Gadze returned to India, this time with I-League side Rajasthan United.

==== Paro ====
In April 2024, Gadze signed for Bhutan Premier League club Paro.

==== Persiku Kudus ====
In December 2024, Gadze signed for Indonesian second division club Persiku Kudus.

== International career ==
On 30 August 2013, Gadze made his international debut in an 1–0 defeat to Libya. In November 2013, coach Maxwell Konadu, invited him to be a part of the Ghana squad for the 2013 WAFU Nations Cup. He helped the team to a first-place finish after Ghana beat Senegal by three goals to one.

== Career statistics ==
=== Club ===
As of match played 25 February 2025

Appearances and goals by club, season and competition
Club	Season	League			National cup		League cup		Continental		Other		Total	
Club	Season	Division	Apps	Goals	Apps	Goals	Apps	Goals	Apps	Goals	Apps	Goals	Apps	Goals
Delhi Dynamos	2015	Indian Super League	16	4	–		–		–		–		16	4
Delhi Dynamos	2016	Indian Super League	12	5	–		–		–		–		12	5
Delhi Dynamos	Total		28	9	–		–		–		–		28	9
HJK (loan)	2016	Veikkausliiga	14	0	2	0	0	0	4	0	–		20	0
Zira (loan)	2016–17	Azerbaijan Premier League	12	3	0	0	–		–		–		12	3
Zira	2017–18	Azerbaijan Premier League	23	7	2	0	–		4	2	–		29	9
Voluntari	2018–19	Liga I	28	6	1	0	–		–		–		29	6
Zira	2019–20	Azerbaijan Premier League	11	3	2	0	–		–		–		13	3
Sheriff Tiraspol	2020–21	Moldovan Super Liga	18	5	0	0	–		1	0	–		19	5
Bnei Sakhnin	2021–22	Israeli Premier League	0	0	0	0	2	0	–		–		2	0
Sheikh Russel	2021–22	Bangladesh Premier League	11	3	0	0	–		–		–		11	3
Sumgayit	2022–23	Azerbaijan Premier League	7	1	1	0	–		–		–		8	1
Rajasthan United	2023–24	I-League	9	0	–		–		–		–		9	0
Paro	2024	Bhutan Premier League	17	27	–		–		–		–		17	27
Persiku Kudus	2024–25	Liga 2	10	2	–		–		–		–		10	2
Career total			188	66	8	0	2	0	9	2	0	0	207	68
