= Clube Atlético Assisense =

Assisense
- Full name: Clube Atlético Assisense
- Nickname: Falcão do Vale
- Founded: 27 March 1995 (30 years ago)
- Ground: Estádio Antônio Viana da Silva
- Capacity: 8,525
- 2022: Paulista Segunda Divisão, 25th of 36
Home colors	Away colors

Clube Atlético Assisense, or simply Assisense, is a Brazilian football team based in Assis, São Paulo. Founded in 1995, it plays in Campeonato Paulista Segunda Divisão.

== History ==
The club was founded on March 27, 1995, as an amateur team by the fathers of the youngsters playing in the Escolinha de Futebol Peraltinha youth academy. As the youth academy had a partnership with Cruzeiro Esporte Clube, they adopted the same colors as the Minas Gerais-based club and Assis municipality flag. Assisense then adopted the same colors as Cruzeiro and the youth academy. The club professionalized its football department in 2003, competing in the same year in the Campeonato Paulista Série B3.

== Stadium ==
Clube Atlético Assisense play their home games at Estádio Municipal Antônio Viana da Silva, nicknamed Tonicão. The stadium has a maximum capacity of 10,100 people.
