= Ouro-Nile Toure =

Togolese footballer

Personal information
- Date of birth: 6 February 2000 (age 26)
- Place of birth: Sokodé, Togo
- Position: Forward

Senior career*
Years	Team	Apps	(Gls)
–2019	REC		
2020–2021	Assisense		
2022	PSTC		
2022	Sumgayit	3	(0)
- * Club domestic league appearances and goals as of 20 December 2022

Ouro-Nile Toure (born 31 December 1998) is a Togolese professional footballer who plays as a forward.

== Career ==
Toure started his career with Brazilian side REC. In 2022, he signed for Sumgayit in Azerbaijan. On 7 August 2022, Toure debuted for Sumgayit during a 3–0 loss to Sabah (Azerbaijan).
