= Murad Khachayev =

Azerbaijani footballer (born 1998)

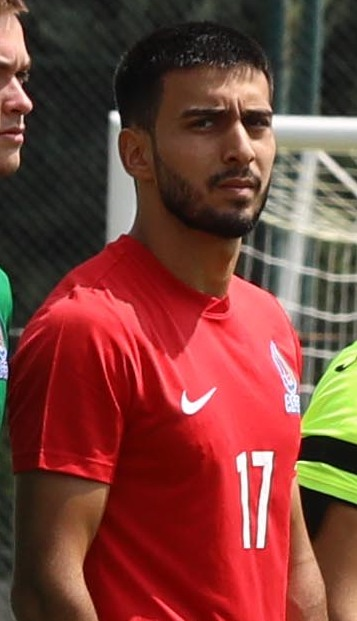
- Khachayev in 2022

Personal information
- Full name: Murad Shamil ohly Khachayev
- Date of birth: 14 April 1998 (age 28)
- Place of birth: Luhansk, Ukraine
- Height: 1.80 m (5 ft 11 in)
- Positions: Defensive midfielder; centre-back

Team information
- Current team: Neftçi
- Number: 17

Youth career
- Shakhtar Donetsk

Senior career*
| Years | Team | Apps | (Gls) |
| 2018–2019 | Shakhtar Donetsk | 0 | (0) |
| 2018–2019 | → Sumgayit (loan) | 7 | (1) |
| 2019–2025 | Sumgayit | 148 | (5) |
| 2025– | Neftçi | 16 | (0) |

International career^{‡}
| 2016 | Azerbaijan U19 | 3 | (1) |
| 2021– | Azerbaijan | 1 | (0) |
Medal record
Men's football
Representing Azerbaijan
Islamic Solidarity Games
| Bronze medal – third place | 2021 Konya |
- * Club domestic league appearances and goals as of 22 June 2026 ‡ National team caps and goals as of 27 May 2021

Murad Shamil ohly Khachayev (Azerbaijani: Murad Şamil oğlu Xaçayev; Ukrainian: Мурад Шаміль огли Хачаєв; born on 14 April 1998) is a professional footballer who plays as a midfielder for Neftçi in the Azerbaijan Premier League. Born in Ukraine, he represents the Azerbaijan national team.

== Career ==
=== Club ===
On 11 August 2018, Khachayev made his debut in the Azerbaijan Premier League for Sumgayit in a match against Neftçi Baku.

=== International ===
He made his debut for the Azerbaijan national football team on 27 May 2021 in a friendly against Turkey.
