= Jean Carioca (footballer, born 1978) =

Brazilian footballer

Personal information
- Full name: Jean da Silva Duarte
- Date of birth: 1 September 1978 (age 48)
- Place of birth: Rio de Janeiro, Brazil
- Height: 1.88 m (6 ft 2 in)
- Positions: Defender; defensive midfielder

Senior career*
Years	Team	Apps	(Gls)
- Botafogo (RJ)
- Madureira
- Moto Club
- Sampaio Corrêa
2003	OFK Beograd		
- Moto Club
2005	Luziânia		
2006	Ceilândia		
2006	Sampaio Corrêa		
2007	Moto Club		
2008	Grêmio Barueri		
2008	Ceilândia		
2009–2010	Rio Branco (AC)		
2010	Moto Club		
2011	Rio Branco (AC)		
- * Club domestic league appearances and goals as of 7 September 2009

Jean da Silva Duarte, commonly known as Jean Carioca (born 1 September 1978) is a Brazilian former professional footballer who played as a defender.

== Career ==
Born in Rio de Janeiro, thus also often known as Jean Carioca (a Portuguese term used for individuals native to Rio), he played for his home town clubs Botafogo de Futebol e Regatas and Madureira Esporte Clube before moving to Moto Club de São Luís, a club where he will often return during his career. He played with Sampaio Corrêa Futebol Clube before moving abroad in February 2003 to join Serbian club OFK Beograd playing back then in the First League of Serbia and Montenegro. After returning to Brazil he represented Moto Club and Associação Atlética Luziânia before signing a one-year contract in December 2005 with Ceilândia Esporte Clube, Moto Club and Sampaio Correia, before joining Grêmio Barueri Futebol in 2008. Afterwards he played again with Ceilandia, Moto Club before joining Rio Branco Football Club in May 2009.

== Honours ==
Moto Club

- Campeonato Maranhense: 3x

Grêmio Barueri

- Campeonato Paulista: 2008

Rio Branco

- Campeonato Acriano: 2010, 2011, 2012

== External sources ==
- Jean Carioca at Soccerway (archived)
- Stats in Futpédia
- Profile in Holdingsa
