= Vugar Beybalayev =

Azerbaijani footballer (born 1993)

Personal information
- Full name: Vugar Beybalayev
- Date of birth: 5 August 1993 (age 33)
- Place of birth: Sumgayit, Azerbaijan
- Height: 1.81 m (5 ft 11 in)
- Position: Midfielder

Team information
- Current team: Sabail
- Number: 10

Senior career*
Years	Team	Apps	(Gls)
2012–2015	Baku	30	(0)
2013	→ Turan-Tovuz (loan)	9	(0)
2015	Ravan Baku	18	(0)
2016	Khazar Lankaran	16	(0)
2016–2017	Kapaz	19	(0)
2017–2018	Sumgayit	25	(0)
2018–2021	Sabail FK	33	(0)
2021–	FC Telavi	4	(0)
- * Club domestic league appearances and goals as of 25 April 2021

Vugar Beybalayev (Azerbaijani: Vüqar Bəybalayev; born on 5 August 1993) is an Azerbaijani professional footballer who plays as a midfielder for FC Telavi in the Erovnuli Liga.

== Club career ==
On 13 February 2013, Beybalayev made his debut in the Azerbaijan Premier League for Turan-Tovuz match against Baku.
