= Filipe Chaby =

Portuguese footballer

Personal information
- Full name: Carlos Filipe Fonseca Chaby
- Date of birth: 22 January 1994 (age 32)
- Place of birth: Setúbal, Portugal
- Height: 1.75 m (5 ft 9 in)
- Position: Attacking midfielder

Youth career
- 2002–2006: Vitória Setúbal
- 2006–2013: Sporting CP

Senior career*
Years	Team	Apps	(Gls)
2012–2017	Sporting CP B	57	(6)
2015	→ União Madeira (loan)	18	(1)
2016–2017	→ Covilhã (loan)	35	(6)
2017–2018	Belenenses	13	(0)
2018–2019	B-SAD	1	(0)
2019–2022	Sporting CP	0	(0)
2019	→ Estoril (loan)	5	(0)
2019–2021	→ Académica (loan)	36	(2)
2021–2022	→ Nacional (loan)	11	(1)
2022	Sumgayit	15	(0)
2023–2024	Belenenses	14	(0)
2025	Semen Padang	24	(4)

International career
2009–2010	Portugal U16	10	(1)
2010–2011	Portugal U17	14	(1)
2011–2012	Portugal U18	10	(2)
2013	Portugal U19	1	(0)
- * Club domestic league appearances and goals as of 9 November 2025

Carlos Filipe Fonseca Chaby (born 22 January 1994) is a Portuguese professional footballer who plays as an attacking midfielder.

Developed at Sporting CP where he was only a reserve, he played 14 Primeira Liga games for Belenenses and B-SAD but spent the vast majority of his career in the second tier, where he made 172 appearances and scored 16 goals in service of seven clubs.

== Club career ==
Born in Setúbal and of Mozambican descent, Chaby joined Sporting CP's youth system at the age of 12, from local Vitória FC. On 1 December 2011, whilst still a junior, he remained an unused substitute in the 2–0 home win against FC Zürich in the group stage of the UEFA Europa League, alongside fellow youth graduates João Carlos and João Mário. He first appeared in the Segunda Liga with the B team eight months later, starting and playing 61 minutes in a 1–0 loss at U.D. Oliveirense.

On 20 January 2015, Chaby was loaned to C.F. União of the second division until the end of the season, and he started in 14 of his appearances for the club as it achieved promotion to the Primeira Liga after more than two decades, scoring in a 3–1 away victory over S.L. Benfica B on 1 March. On 30 August, he returned to Madeira until the end of the campaign, also on loan, but played just two cup games.

In August 2016, Chaby was loaned again, to second-tier S.C. Covilhã alongside Cristian Ponde. He scored a career-best six goals in an eighth-place finish, including two on 23 April in a 4–0 win at Varzim SC.

Chaby joined C.F. Os Belenenses in early June 2017, on a four-year contract. During his spell at the Estádio do Restelo, he was often sidelined with injury problems; on 29 January 2018, he was sent off at the end of a 1–1 home draw with S.L. Benfica for telling the referee to respect teams from outside the Big Three.

Sporting reacquired Chaby in January 2019, and loaned him immediately to G.D. Estoril Praia in the second tier. More of the same in the ensuing off-season, as he signed with Académica de Coimbra of the same league.

Chaby left Portuguese football for the first time in 2022, joining FK Khazar Sumgayit of the Azerbaijan Premier League. Halfway through the season, he returned to Belenenses in Liga 3.

On 4 January 2025, Chaby joined Super League (Indonesia) club Semen Padang FC. On 22 November, he had his contracted terminated.
