= Peyman Keshavarzi =

Iranian footballer

Personal information
- Full name: Peyman Keshavarzi Nazarloo
- Date of birth: 6 March 1995 (age 31)
- Place of birth: Shabestar, Iran
- Height: 1.80 m (5 ft 11 in)
- Position: Defender

Team information
- Current team: Karvan
- Number: 5

Youth career
- –2014: Tractor Sazi

Senior career*
Years	Team	Apps	(Gls)
2014–2016	Tractor Sazi	1	(0)
2016	Machine Sazi	6	(0)
2016–2017	Esteghlal Ahvaz	7	(0)
2017–2018	Machine Sazi	6	(0)
2018	Gostaresh Foulad	0	(0)
2019	Sumgayit	2	(0)
2020	Sabail	17	(2)
2021	Tractor SC	4	(0)
2022–2023	Kapaz	6	(0)
2023–2024	Mes Soongoun	0	(0)
2024–	Karvan	0	(0)

International career
2014	Iran U23	2	(0)
- * Club domestic league appearances and goals as of 14 September 2024

Peyman Keshavarzi (Persian: پیمان کشاورزی; born 6 March 1995) is an Iranian footballer who plays as a defender for Azerbaijan Second League side Karvan.

== Career ==
Keshavarzi started at the academy of Iranian team Tractor Sazi, before being promoted to the first team in 2014. He played one game for the first team, before joining Machine Sazi in 2016. In total, he spent five years playing in Iran with Tractor Sazi, Machine Sazi, Esteghlal Ahvaz, and Gostaresh Foulad, before joining Azerbaijani team Sumgayit in 2019. He joined Sabail FK in June 2020.

On 16 March 2021, he rejoined Tractor SC.

On 11 September 2024, Keşavarzi signed a one-year contract with Azerbaijan Second League club Karvan.

== Career statistics ==
Last Update: 30 March 2021

Club performance			League		Cup		Continental		Total	
Season	Club	League	Apps	Goals	Apps	Goals	Apps	Goals	Apps	Goals
Iran			League		Hazfi Cup		Asia		Total	
2014	Tractor Sazi	Persian Pro League	1	0	0	0	–		1	0
2015	Tractor Sazi	Persian Pro League	0	0	0	0	–		0	0
2016	Machine Sazi	Persian Pro League	0	0	1	0	–		0	0
2016	Esteghlal Ahvaz	Persian Pro League	7	0	3	0	–		7	0
2017	Machine Sazi	Persian Pro League	6	0	0	0	–		6	0
2018	Gostaresh Foulad	Persian Pro League	0	0	0	0			0	0
2019	Sumgayit	Azerbaijan Pro League	2	0	0	0			2	0
2020	Sabail	Azerbaijan Pro League	17	2	3	0			17	2
2021	Tractor	Persian Pro League	4	0	0	0			2	0
2022	Kapaz PFK	Azerbaijan Pro League	0	0	0	0			0	0
Career total			35	2	7	0	–		35	2

== Honours ==
Tractor Sazi

- Persian Gulf Pro League: 2014-15 (Runner-Up)

Sumgayit

- Azerbaijan Cup: 2018-19 (Runner-Up)
