= Todor Todoroski =

Macedonian footballer

Personal information
- Date of birth: 26 February 1999 (age 27)
- Place of birth: Prilep, Macedonia
- Height: 1.80 m (5 ft 11 in)
- Position: Right-back

Team information
- Current team: Flamurtari Vlorë
- Number: 30

Youth career
- –2012: 11 Oktomvri
- 2013–2014: Kozhuf
- 2014–2016: Metalurg Skopje
- 2016–2017: Vardar

Senior career*
| Years | Team | Apps | (Gls) |
| 2016 | Metalurg Skopje | 3 | (0) |
| 2017–2018 | Vardar | 38 | (0) |
| 2019–2020 | Osijek II | 23 | (3) |
| 2019–2021 | Osijek | 6 | (0) |
| 2020–2021 | → Šibenik (loan) | 18 | (0) |
| 2021 | Radnički Niš | 8 | (0) |
| 2022 | Sereď | 13 | (0) |
| 2022–2023 | Sumgayit | 31 | (3) |
| 2023 | Zalaegerszeg | 5 | (0) |
| 2024–2025 | Politehnica Iași | 30 | (0) |
| 2025– | Flamurtari Vlorë | 22 | (2) |

International career^{‡}
| 2014–2015 | North Macedonia U17 | 4 | (0) |
| 2016–2017 | North Macedonia U18 | 6 | (0) |
| 2016–2018 | North Macedonia U19 | 8 | (0) |
| 2018–2020 | North Macedonia U21 | 19 | (0) |
| 2021–2022 | North Macedonia | 6 | (0) |
- * Club domestic league appearances and goals as of 13 May 2026 ‡ National team caps and goals as of 29 September 2022

Todor Todoroski (Macedonian: Тодор Тодороски; born 26 February 1999) is a Macedonian professional footballer who plays as a right-back for Albanian club Flamurtari Vlorë.

== Club career ==
Todoroski made his senior football debut on 20 April 2016 at the age of 17, by entering the game for Metalurg at the start of the second halftime in the First Macedonian Football League match against Renova. That season he went on to play two more games, which eventually brought him a transfer to FK Vardar in the following summer in 2016. Vardar initially signed him for their youth team, but in 2017 they eventually promoted him to the first team. Todor was regular in the upcoming 2017–18 and 2018–19 seasons, which caught the eye of Croatian side NK Osijek who decided to sign him at the beginning of 2019 to play for their second team. After successful 6 months playing for Osijek II in the Croatian Second Football League, in the summer of 2019 they decided to promote him to the first team. On 28 July 2019, he made his debut for the first Osijek team, having played the full game against Gorica in the second round of the 2019–20 Croatian First Football League.

== International career ==
From 2014 to 2020, Todoroski was a regular at most of North Macedonia's national youth teams.

He made his debut for senior team on 11 November 2021 in a World Cup qualifier against Armenia.

=== International statistics ===
As of 26 September 2022

Appearances and goals by national team and year
| National team | Year | Apps | Goals |
|---|---|---|---|
| North Macedonia | 2021 | 1 | 0 |
| North Macedonia | 2022 | 5 | 0 |
| Total | | 6 | 0 |

== Honours ==
Vardar

- 1. MFL: 2016–17
