= Almir Aganspahić =

Bosnian footballer

Personal information
- Date of birth: 12 September 1996 (age 30)
- Place of birth: Sarajevo, Bosnia and Herzegovina
- Height: 1.89 m (6 ft 2 in)
- Position: Forward

Team information
- Current team: Velež Mostar
- Number: 28

Youth career
- 2007–2011: Novi Grad Sarajevo
- 2011–2012: Olimpik Sarajevo
- 2013–2014: Sarajevo

Senior career*
Years	Team	Apps	(Gls)
2013–2014	Sarajevo	2	(0)
2015	Osijek	5	(0)
2016	Raufoss	25	(2)
2017–2018	Mladost Doboj Kakanj	38	(3)
2018–2019	Krupa	23	(4)
2019–2020	Čelik Zenica	11	(0)
2020–2022	Novi Pazar	54	(18)
2022–2023	Čukarički	22	(1)
2022	→ Sumgayit (loan)	12	(2)
2023–2024	Shkëndija	30	(12)
2024–2025	Liepāja	9	(0)
2025–2026	Gjilani	25	(7)
2026	Boluspor	4	(0)
2026–	Velež Mostar	1	(0)

International career
2012	Bosnia and Herzegovina U17	3	(0)
2017	Bosnia and Herzegovina U21	2	(1)
- * Club domestic league appearances and goals as of 9 October 2026

Almir Aganspahić (born 12 September 1996) is a Bosnian professional footballer who plays as a forward for Bosnian Premier League club Velež Mostar.

== Club career ==
On 24 January 2025, Aganspahić signed a one-and-a-half-year contract with Gjilani in Kosovo.

== Career statistics ==
As of match played 9 October 2026

Appearances and goals by club, season and competition
Club	Season	League			National cup (Note: Includes Norwegian Cup, Bosnian Cup, Serbian Cup, Latvian Cup, Kosovar Cup)		Continental		Total	
Club	Season	Division	Apps	Goals	Apps	Goals	Apps	Goals	Apps	Goals
Sarajevo	2012–13	Bosnian Premier League	1	0	—		—		1	0
Sarajevo	2013–14	Bosnian Premier League	1	0	—		2 (Note: Appearances in UEFA Europa League)	0	3	0
Sarajevo	Total		2	0	—		2	0	4	0
Osijek	2015–16	Croatian First League	5	0	—		—		5	0
Raufoss	2016	Norwegian First Division	25	2	1	0	—		26	2
Mladost Doboj Kakanj	2016–17	Bosnian Premier League	12	1	3	1	—		15	2
Mladost Doboj Kakanj	2017–18	Bosnian Premier League	26	2	2	0	—		28	2
Mladost Doboj Kakanj	Total		38	3	5	1	—		43	4
Krupa	2018–19	Bosnian Premier League	23	4	1	0	—		24	4
Čelik Zenica	2019–20	Bosnian Premier League	11	0	1	0	—		12	0
Novi Pazar	2020–21	Serbian SuperLiga	34	11	—		—		34	11
Novi Pazar	2021–22	Serbian SuperLiga	20	7	—		—		20	7
Novi Pazar	Total		54	18	—		—		54	18
Čukarički	2021–22	Serbian SuperLiga	11	0	—		—		11	0
Čukarički	2022–23	Serbian SuperLiga	11	1	4	0	—		15	1
Čukarički	Total		22	1	4	0	—		26	1
Sumgayit (loan)	2022–23	Azerbaijan Premier League	12	2	—		—		12	2
Shkëndija	2023–24	Macedonian First League	30	12	—		2 (Note: Appearances in UEFA Conference League)	0	32	12
Liepāja	2024	Latvian Higher League	9	0	1	0	—		10	0
Gjilani	2024–25	Kosovo Superleague	15	4	—		—		15	4
Gjilani	2025–26	Kosovo Superleague	10	3	1	1	—		11	4
Gjilani	Total		25	7	1	1	—		26	8
Boluspor	2025–26	TFF 1. Lig	4	0	—		—		4	0
Velež Mostar	2026–27	Bosnian Premier League	1	0	0	0	—		1	0
Career total			261	49	14	2	4	0	279	51

== Honours ==
Sarajevo

- Bosnian Cup: 2013–14
