= Steven Pereira =

Footballer (born 1994)

Personal information
- Full name: Steven Fernandes Pereira
- Date of birth: 13 April 1994 (age 32)
- Place of birth: Rotterdam, Netherlands
- Height: 1.86 m (6 ft 1 in)
- Position: Centre-back

Youth career
- 2011–2012: Alphense Boys
- 2012–2013: Spartaan '20
- 2013: PEC Zwolle

Senior career*
Years	Team	Apps	(Gls)
2014–2015	PEC Zwolle	3	(0)
2015–2018	MVV Maastricht	101	(2)
2018–2019	CSKA Sofia	8	(0)
2019–2020	Santa Clara	0	(0)
2019–2020	→ Académico de Viseu (loan)	11	(1)
2020–2021	Oliveirense	22	(0)
2022	Maritzburg United	11	(0)
2022–2023	Sumgayit	22	(1)
2024	PSKC Cimahi	6	(0)

International career
2017–2022	Cape Verde	10	(0)
- * Club domestic league appearances and goals as of 9 November 2024

Steven Fernandes Pereira (born 13 April 1994) is a professional footballer who plays as a centre-back. Born in the Netherlands, he represents the Cape Verde national football team. He formerly played for PEC Zwolle in the Dutch Eredivisie, MVV Maastricht and Bulgarian club CSKA Sofia.

== Club career ==
On 4 July 2022, Azerbaijan Premier League club Sumgayit announced the signing of Pereira to a two-year contract, with the option of an additional year.

== International career ==
Born in the Netherlands and of Cape Verdean descent, Pereira debuted for the Cape Verde national football team in a 2–1 2018 FIFA World Cup qualification victory over South Africa on 1 September 2017.

== Honours ==
PEC Zwolle

- Johan Cruyff Shield: 2014
