= Samir Abasov =

Azerbaijani footballer and manager (born 1978)

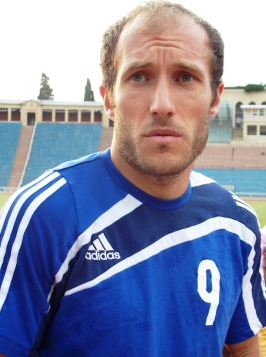

Personal information
- Date of birth: 1 February 1978 (age 48)
- Place of birth: Sumgait, Azerbaijan SSR, Soviet Union
- Height: 1.84 m (6 ft 1/2 in)
- Position: Defender

Senior career*
Years	Team	Apps	(Gls)
2001–2002	Sahdagh-Samur Qusar		
2003–2004	Neftçi	16	(0)
2004–2005	Qarabagh	21	(2)
2005–2006	Karvan	8	(1)
2006–2007	Qarabagh	22	(0)
2007–2010	Inter Baku	67	(1)
2010–2011	Qarabagh	14	(0)
2011–2014	Sumgait	82	(3)
Total		230	(7)

International career
2004–2011	Azerbaijan	46	(0)

Managerial career
- 2015–2018: Sumgait
- 2018–2019: Zira
- 2020–2022: Neftçi
- 2022–2024: Sumgait
- 2024–2025: Neftçi
- * Club domestic league appearances and goals

Samir Ramiz oghlu Abasov (Azerbaijani: Samir Ramiz oğlu Abasov; born 1 February 1978) is an Azerbaijani football manager and a former defender.

== Managerial career ==
On 8 October 2015, Abasov replaced Agil Mammadov as manager of Sumgait until the end of the 2015–16 season.

On 29 August 2018, Abasov was appointed as the manager of Zira.

On 26 September 2022, he was reappointed as the Sumgayit head coach. A contract was signed with him until the end of the 2024–25 season.

On 14 October 2024, Abasov reached an agreement to become the head coach of Neftçi, and in light of this agreement, along with the coach's personal request, his contract with Sumgayit was mutually terminated. He was dismissed by the club on 25 November 2025.

== Career statistics ==
As of 13 May 2014

Club performance			League		Cup		Continental		Total	
Season	Club	League	Apps	Goals	Apps	Goals	Apps	Goals	Apps	Goals
2003–04	Neftchi Baku	Azerbaijan Premier League	16	0			—		16	0
2004–05	Qarabagh	Azerbaijan Premier League	21	2			—		21	2
2005–06	Karvan	Azerbaijan Premier League	8	1			—		8	1
2006–07	Qarabagh	Azerbaijan Premier League	22	0			—		22	0
2007–08	Inter Baku	Azerbaijan Premier League	18	0			—		18	0
2008–09	Inter Baku	Azerbaijan Premier League	21	1			4	0	25	1
2009–10	Inter Baku	Azerbaijan Premier League	25	3	3	0	2	0	27	3
2010–11	Qarabagh	Azerbaijan Premier League	14	0	0	0	8	0	22	0
2011–12	Sumgait	Azerbaijan Premier League	28	3	0	0	—		28	3
2012–13	Sumgait	Azerbaijan Premier League	28	0	1	0	—		29	0
2013–14	Sumgait	Azerbaijan Premier League	26	0	1	0	—		27	0
Total	Azerbaijan		227	10	5	0	14	0	246	10
Career total			227	10	5	0	14	0	246	10
