= Karim Abubakar =

Ghanaian footballer

Personal information
- Date of birth: 30 July 1995 (age 31)
- Place of birth: Accra, Ghana
- Height: 1.78 m (5 ft 10 in)
- Position: Striker

Team information
- Current team: Badajoz

Youth career
- –2009: Proud United
- 2009–2010: All Blacks

Senior career*
Years	Team	Apps	(Gls)
2010–2013	Medeama		
2013	→ Okwawu United (loan)		
2013–2015	Leganés	0	(0)
2014	→ Alcorcón B (loan)		
2014–2015	→ Conquense (loan)	12	(1)
2015–2016	Don Benito		
2016–2017	Valdivia		
2017–2018	Plasencia		
2018–2019	Don Benito	11	(1)
2019–2020	Algeciras	49	(10)
2020–2021	Yeclano Deportivo	23	(3)
2021–2022	Hapoel Acre	36	(11)
2022–2023	Bnei Yehuda	16	(2)
2023	Sumgayit	18	(3)
2023	Sliema Wanderers	8	(0)
2024	Águilas	11	(2)
2024–2025	Al-Qasim	21	(2)
2025–	Badajoz	0	(0)
- * Club domestic league appearances and goals as of 30 September 2025

Karim Abubakar (born 30 June 1995) is a Ghanaian footballer who plays as a striker for Segunda Federación – Group 4 club Badajoz.

== Club career ==
=== Early years in Ghana ===
Abubakar began his career with a Ghanaian junior-level club, Proud United. In 2008–09, he was the club's top scorer. In 2009–10, Abubakar moved to Division One League side Gamba All Blacks.

He transferred to Medeama S.C.'s reserve team in 2010–11. He was the top scorer of the season, and the team went on to become champions of the Southern Zone. Abubakar earned a first team spot after a successful season with the reserve side and played a further two seasons, scoring two goals in the 2011–12 campaign.

Abubakar was loaned in the January transfer window of the 2012–13 season to Okwawu United, another first division team, which reached the promotion playoffs.

=== Career in Spain ===
In 2013–14, Abubakar signed a three-year contract with Spanish side CD Leganés, where he played four months with the under-19 team. Later that season, he was loaned to AD Alcorcón B in the Tercera División. He was the top scorer and player of the year for the side, despite arriving mid-season. In 2014–15, he returned to the Leganés first team and made a preseason appearance. He was later loaned to UB Conquense in the Segunda División B. His contract was terminated due to unsettled salaries. Abubakar then joined CD Don Benito in the Tercera División.

In 2016–17, he moved to CD Valdivia, also in the third division. In 2017–18, he moved to UP Plasencia, also in the third division.

On 24 January 2023, Sumgayit announced the signing of Abubakar from Bnei Yehuda on a contract until the summer of 2023, with an option for an additional year. On 7 June 2023, Sumgayit announced that Abubakar had left the club after his contract had expired.

On 19 August 2023, Maltese Premier League side Sliema Wanderers announced the signing of Abubakar.

In September 2025, Abubakar returned to Spain following a spell with Iraq Stars League club Al-Qasim, joining Badajoz.
