= Terrence Tisdell =

Liberian footballer

Personal information
- Full name: Terrence Leonard Tisdell
- Date of birth: 16 March 1998 (age 28)
- Place of birth: Monrovia, Liberia
- Height: 1.77 m (5 ft 10 in)
- Positions: Winger; striker

Youth career
- –2014: UMC Roots FC

Senior career*
Years	Team	Apps	(Gls)
2015	MC Breweries	16	(7)
2015–2017	FC Fassell	41	(13)
2017	LISCR	0	(0)
2018	→ Costa do Sol (loan)	19	(5)
2018–2019	Sanjoanense	18	(2)
2019	Baroka	7	(0)
2020–2021	Hapoel Petah Tikva	31	(3)
2021–2022	Kocaelispor	12	(1)
2022	Botoșani	9	(1)
2022–2023	Sumgayit	13	(1)

International career^{‡}
2016	Liberia U20	1	(0)
2016–	Liberia	12	(1)
- * Club domestic league appearances and goals as of 7 June 2023 ‡ National team caps and goals as of 10 October 2021

Terrence Leonard Tisdell (born 16 March 1998) is a Liberian professional footballer who plays as a winger or striker for the Liberia national team.

== Club career ==
=== FC Fassell ===
In mid-2015, Terrence joined FC Fassell, making 41 appearances and scoring 13 goals in the Liberian Premier League.

=== LISCR FC ===
During the 2017 season, he joined fellow Liberian side LISCR on a three-year deal.

=== Costa do Sol ===
He departed Liberia for Mozambique in 2018, joining Costa do Sol on a season-long loan deal.

=== Sanjoanense ===
Later that year, Tisdell moved to Portugal where he joined Campeonato de Portugal side Sanjoanense.

=== Baroka ===
He returned to Africa on 3 July 2019, signing with South Africa South African Premiership side Baroka.

=== Hapoel Petah Tikva ===
On 27 August 2020, he signed for Israeli side Hapoel Petah Tikva.

=== Kocaelispor ===
In July 2021 he moved to Turkish First Division club Kocaelispor on a two-year deal.

=== Botoșani ===
In January 2022 he signed for Romanian club Botoșani.

=== Sumgayit ===
On 23 December 2022, Sumgayit announced the signing of Tisdell until the end of the season. On 7 June 2023, Sumgayit announced that Tisdell had left the club after his contract had expired.

== International career ==
Tisdell has represented Liberia at the under-20 and senior levels, serving as a mainstay for the latter since his debut in 2016.

=== International stats ===
As of match played 10 October 2021

Appearances and goals by national team and year
National team	Year	Apps	Goals
Liberia	2016	1	0
Liberia	2017	2	0
Liberia	2018	0	0
Liberia	2019	5	1
Liberia	2020	0	0
Liberia	2021	4	0
Total		12	1

=== International goals ===
Scores and results list Liberia's goal tally first.

No.	Date	Venue	Opponent	Score	Result	Competition
1.	4 September 2019	SKD Stadium, Monrovia, Liberia	Sierra Leone	1–0	3–1	2022 FIFA World Cup qualification

== Honors ==
Costa do Sol

- Taça de Moçambique: 2018
- Supertaça Moçambique : 2018

Individual Honors

- LFA Super Cup Most Valuable Player Award: 2018
