= Diego Carioca =

Brazilian footballer (born 1998)

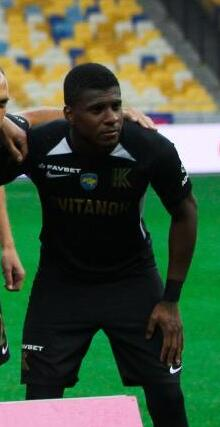

Personal information
- Full name: Diego Silva Nascimento Santos
- Date of birth: 6 February 1998 (age 28)
- Place of birth: Niterói, Brazil
- Height: 1.77 m (5 ft 10 in)
- Position: Left winger

Team information
- Current team: Al-Kahrabaa

Youth career
- 2016: Aimoré
- 2017: Grêmio

Senior career*
Years	Team	Apps	(Gls)
2018–2019	Aimoré	2	(0)
2019	Lajeadense	0	(0)
2019–2021	Vitebsk	53	(7)
2020	→ Shakhtyor Soligorsk (loan)	4	(0)
2021–2025	Kolos Kovalivka	30	(2)
2022	→ Jagiellonia Białystok (loan)	8	(2)
2022	→ Zalaegerszeg (loan)	4	(0)
2023	→ Sumgayit (loan)	10	(1)
2025	Chadormalou Ardakan	6	(0)
2025–2026	Ayutthaya United	23	(4)
2026–	Al-Kahrabaa	0	(0)
- * Club domestic league appearances and goals as of 15 March 2025

Diego Silva Nascimento Santos (born 6 February 1998), better known as Diego Carioca, is a Brazilian professional footballer who plays as a left winger for Iraq Stars League club Al-Kahrabaa.

== Career ==
On 12 January 2023, Sumgayit announced the signing of Carioca on loan from Kolos Kovalivka until the end of the season. On 7 June 2023, Sumgayit confirmed that Carioca had left the club at the end of his contract.
