= List of Azerbaijan football transfers summer 2022 =

This is a list of Azerbaijan football transfers in the summer transfer window, which takes place between 10 June and 1 September, by club. Only clubs of the 2022–23 Azerbaijan Premier League are included.

== Azerbaijan Premier League 2022-23 ==
=== Gabala ===
In: Note: Flags indicate national team as defined under FIFA eligibility rules; some limited exceptions apply. Players may hold more than one non-FIFA nationality.

No.	Pos.	Nation	Player
1	GK	AZE	Salahat Aghayev (from (Azerbaijan) Sabah)
2	DF	AZE	Ilkin Qirtimov (from (Azerbaijan) Shamakhi)
6	MF	ISR	Fares Abu Akel (from (Israel) Ashdod)
8	MF	UKR	Andriy Stryzhak (from (Croatia) Međimurje)
91	FW	BRA	Ramon (from (Azerbaijan) Neftçi)
97	MF	BRA	Felipe Santos (from (Azerbaijan) Shamakhi)\

Out: Note: Flags indicate national team as defined under FIFA eligibility rules; some limited exceptions apply. Players may hold more than one non-FIFA nationality.

No.	Pos.	Nation	Player
2	DF	AZE	Samet Karakoc (to (Turkey) Isparta 32 Spor)
6	MF	AZE	Kamal Mirzayev (to (Azerbaijan) Shamakhi)
7	MF	AZE	Ehtiram Shahverdiyev (to (Azerbaijan) Turan-Tovuz)
8	MF	MNE	Stefan Vukčević (to (Cyprus) Enosis Neon Paralimni)
9	MF	ESP	Fernán López (to (Cyprus) Enosis Neon Paralimni)
24	FW	BRA	Patrick (loan return to (Austria) Admira Wacker Mödling)
94	GK	AZE	Nijat Mehbaliyev (loan return to (Azerbaijan) Sabah)

=== Kapaz ===
In: Note: Flags indicate national team as defined under FIFA eligibility rules; some limited exceptions apply. Players may hold more than one non-FIFA nationality.

No.	Pos.	Nation	Player
2	DF	AZE	Zamig Aliyev (on loan from (Azerbaijan) Qarabağ)
5	DF	IRN	Peyman Keshavarzi
7	MF	GEO	Giorgi Kantaria (from (Georgia (country)) Telavi)
8	DF	AZE	Tural Akhundov (from (Azerbaijan) Shamakhi)
9	MF	GEO	Mate Kvirkvia (from (Georgia (country)) Gagra)
10	MF	NGA	Ahmed Isaiah (from (Azerbaijan) Zira)
11	FW	AZE	Rauf Aliyev (from (Azerbaijan) Sabail)
12	GK	AZE	Kamran Ibrahimov (from (Azerbaijan) Neftçi)
19	MF	NGA	Abdullahi Shuaibu (from (Moldova) Sucleia)
22	MF	AZE	Afran Ismayilov (from (Azerbaijan) Sabail)
24	FW	GEO	Mikheil Ergemlidze (from (Azerbaijan) Sabah)
27	MF	AZE	Samir Maharramli (on loan from (Azerbaijan) Sabah)
29	DF	RUS	Rinat Guseynov (from (Russia) Zvezda Perm)
32	DF	AZE	Elvin Yunuszade
68	GK	AZE	Orkhan Sadigli
77	MF	AZE	Farid Nabiyev (from (Czech Republic) Viktoria Žižkov)
79	DF	BLR	Yegor Khvalko (from (Belarus) Arsenal Dzerzhinsk)

Out: Note: Flags indicate national team as defined under FIFA eligibility rules; some limited exceptions apply. Players may hold more than one non-FIFA nationality.

No.	Pos.	Nation	Player
—	DF	AZE	Qarakhan Aliyev
—	DF	AZE	Vusal Masimov (loan return to (Azerbaijan) Gabala)
—	DF	AZE	Ibrahim Qadirzada
—	MF	AZE	Vüqar Hasanov (to (Azerbaijan) Sabail)
—	MF	AZE	Roman Huseynov
—	FW	AZE	Emil Gasimov

=== Neftçi ===
In: Note: Flags indicate national team as defined under FIFA eligibility rules; some limited exceptions apply. Players may hold more than one non-FIFA nationality.

No.	Pos.	Nation	Player
4	DF	GEO	Solomon Kvirkvelia (from (Georgia (country)) Gagra)
5	MF	USA	Kenny Saief (from (Belgium) Anderlecht)
11	FW	GHA	Godsway Donyoh (from (Israel) Maccabi Haifa)
17	MF	AZE	Rahman Hajiyev (loan return from (Azerbaijan) Shamakhi)
18	MF	GEO	Vato Arveladze (from (Turkey) Fatih Karagümrük)
23	MF	ISR	Ataa Jaber (from (Israel) Ashdod)
77	FW	BLR	Yegor Bogomolsky (from (Belarus) Minsk)

Out: Note: Flags indicate national team as defined under FIFA eligibility rules; some limited exceptions apply. Players may hold more than one non-FIFA nationality.

No.	Pos.	Nation	Player
4	DF	POR	Hugo Basto (to (Cyprus) AEL Limassol)
9	FW	BRA	Tiago Bezerra (to (Saudi Arabia) Al-Orobah)
12	GK	AZE	Kamran Ibrahimov (to (Azerbaijan) Kapaz)
20	DF	AZE	Mert Çelik (loan return to (Turkey) İstanbul Başakşehir)
91	FW	BRA	Ramon (to (Azerbaijan) Gabala)
—	GK	AZE	Rashad Azizli (to (Azerbaijan) Shamakhi, previously on loan to (Azerbaijan) Sabail)
—	MF	AZE	Fahmin Muradbayli (released, previously on loan to (Azerbaijan) Shamakhi)
—	MF	AZE	Khayal Najafov (on loan to (Azerbaijan) Turan-Tovuz)
—	MF	AZE	Turan Valizade (on loan to (Azerbaijan) Turan-Tovuz, previously on loan to (Azerbaijan) Shamakhi)
—	MF	AZE	Emin Zamanov (to (Azerbaijan) Sabail)
—	FW	AZE	Mirabdulla Abbasov (to (Azerbaijan) Sabail)

=== Qarabağ ===
In: Note: Flags indicate national team as defined under FIFA eligibility rules; some limited exceptions apply. Players may hold more than one non-FIFA nationality.

No.	Pos.	Nation	Player
4	DF	AZE	Rahil Mammadov (loan return from (Azerbaijan) Zira)
6	MF	BRA	Júlio Romão (from (Portugal) Santa Clara)
8	MF	MNE	Marko Janković (from (Israel) Hapoel Tel Aviv)
11	FW	GHA	Owusu Kwabena (loan return from (Turkey) Ankaragücü)
23	GK	GEO	Luka Gugeshashvili (from (Poland) Jagiellonia Białystok, previously on loan)
—	MF	ESP	Gaspar Panadero (loan return from (Cyprus) AEK Larnaca)

Out: Note: Flags indicate national team as defined under FIFA eligibility rules; some limited exceptions apply. Players may hold more than one non-FIFA nationality.

No.	Pos.	Nation	Player
6	MF	CPV	Patrick Andrade (to (Serbia) Partizan)
11	FW	ESP	Jaime Romero (to (Spain) Cartagena)
25	FW	SEN	Ibrahima Wadji (to (France) Saint-Étienne)
97	FW	AZE	Rustam Akhmedzade (on loan to (Azerbaijan) Zira)
—	MF	AZE	Ruslan Hajiyev (loan to (Azerbaijan) Sabail extended)

=== Sabah ===
In: Note: Flags indicate national team as defined under FIFA eligibility rules; some limited exceptions apply. Players may hold more than one non-FIFA nationality.

No.	Pos.	Nation	Player
9	FW	AZE	Anatoliy Nuriyev (from (Ukraine) Kolos Kovalivka)
13	DF	SEN	Abdoulaye Ba (from (Portugal) Arouca)
17	MF	AZE	Tellur Mutallimov (from (Azerbaijan) Sumgayit)
18	FW	GEO	Davit Volkovi (from (Azerbaijan) Zira)
19	DF	ESP	Jon Irazabal (from (Spain) Amorebieta)
77	MF	AZE	Namiq Alesgerov (from (Turkey) Bursaspor)
94	GK	AZE	Nijat Mehbaliyev (loan return from (Azerbaijan) Gabala)
99	FW	NGA	Emmanuel Apeh (from (Spain) Tenerife)

Out: Note: Flags indicate national team as defined under FIFA eligibility rules; some limited exceptions apply. Players may hold more than one non-FIFA nationality.

No.	Pos.	Nation	Player
1	GK	AZE	Salahat Aghayev (to (Azerbaijan) Gabala)
8	MF	AZE	Shakir Seyidov (loan to (Azerbaijan) Turan-Tovuz, previously on loan to (Latvia) Daugavpils)
9	FW	PAR	Julio Rodríguez
14	DF	AZE	Slavik Alkhasov (to (Azerbaijan) Zira)
17	MF	ESP	Juan Cámara (loan return to (Poland) Jagiellonia Białystok)
24	FW	GEO	Mikheil Ergemlidze (to (Azerbaijan) Kapaz)
55	DF	CRO	Špiro Peričić
73	FW	BRA	Lucas Rangel (loan return to (Ukraine) Vorskla Poltava)
77	MF	AZE	Veysal Rzayev (loan to (Azerbaijan) Turan-Tovuz)
99	DF	BRA	Higor Gabriel (loan to (Belarus) Dinamo Minsk)
—	DF	AZE	Abdulla Rzayev (on loan to (Azerbaijan) Shamakhi)
—	MF	AZE	Nazim Hasanzada (to (Azerbaijan) Turan-Tovuz)
—	MF	AZE	Eltun Turabov (to (Azerbaijan) Turan-Tovuz, previously on loan to (Azerbaijan) Sumgayit)
—	FW	AZE	Kamran Guliyev (on loan to (Azerbaijan) Shamakhi)

=== Sabail ===
In: Note: Flags indicate national team as defined under FIFA eligibility rules; some limited exceptions apply. Players may hold more than one non-FIFA nationality.

No.	Pos.	Nation	Player
1	GK	AZE	Emil Balayev (from (Kazakhstan) Turan)
3	DF	AZE	Turan Manafov (loan return from (Greece) Olympiacos Volos)
4	MF	UKR	Maksym Chekh (on loan from (Ukraine) Shakhtar Donetsk)
5	DF	UKR	Petro Stasyuk (from (Ukraine) Mariupol)
9	FW	AZE	Mirabdulla Abbasov (from (Azerbaijan) Neftçi)
10	FW	AZE	Aghabala Ramazanov (from (Azerbaijan) Zira)
11	FW	CIV	Goba Zakpa (from (Cyprus) Ethnikos Achna)
15	MF	AZE	Vüqar Hasanov (from (Azerbaijan) Kapaz)
17	MF	AZE	Rafael Maharramli (from (Azerbaijan) Shamakhi)
18	MF	AZE	Vusal Qanbarov (from (Azerbaijan) Shamakhi)
19	MF	AZE	Ruslan Hajiyev (loan from (Azerbaijan) Qarabağ extended)
20	DF	ARG	Facundo Cardozo (from (Argentina) Platense)
21	FW	UGA	Luwagga Kizito (from (Israel) Hapoel Nof HaGalil)
22	MF	AZE	Samir Abdullayev (from (Azerbaijan) Shamakhi)
23	DF	BRA	França (from (Portugal) Leixões)
27	MF	BUL	Emil Martinov (from (Bulgaria) CSKA 1948 Sofia)
30	MF	ARG	Franco Mazurek (from (Cyprus) Ethnikos Achna)
72	MF	AZE	Emin Zamanov (from (Azerbaijan) Neftçi)
—	MF	GEO	Amin Karaev (from (Georgia (country)) Dinamo Tbilisi)

Out: Note: Flags indicate national team as defined under FIFA eligibility rules; some limited exceptions apply. Players may hold more than one non-FIFA nationality.

No.	Pos.	Nation	Player
1	GK	AZE	Rashad Azizli (loan return to (Azerbaijan) Neftçi)
5	DF	AZE	Adil Naghiyev (to (Azerbaijan) Shamakhi)
7	MF	AZE	Mirsahib Abbasov (to (Azerbaijan) Zira)
10	MF	AZE	Javid Taghiyev (to (Azerbaijan) Turan-Tovuz)
11	FW	AZE	Rauf Aliyev (to (Azerbaijan) Kapaz)
17	MF	AZE	Elchin Rahimli (to (Azerbaijan) Shamakhi)
19	MF	AZE	Ruslan Hajiyev (loan return to (Azerbaijan) Qarabağ)
21	DF	AZE	Mahammad Mirzabeyov
22	MF	AZE	Afran Ismayilov (to (Azerbaijan) Kapaz)
25	GK	AZE	Elkhan Ahmadov
30	DF	LBR	Jamal Arago (to (Saudi Arabia) Ohod)
32	FW	SVN	Nicolas Rajsel (to (Belgium) FCV Dender EH)
33	MF	LTU	Domantas Šimkus (to (Slovenia) Mura)
34	DF	ALB	Jurgen Goxha (to (Albania) Egnatia)
66	DF	AZE	Ibrahim Aslanli (to (Azerbaijan) Shamakhi)

=== Shamakhi ===
In: Note: Flags indicate national team as defined under FIFA eligibility rules; some limited exceptions apply. Players may hold more than one non-FIFA nationality.

No.	Pos.	Nation	Player
1	GK	AZE	Rashad Azizli (from (Azerbaijan) Neftçi)
2	DF	AZE	Rauf Hüseynli (from (Azerbaijan) Qarabağ)
4	DF	AZE	Arsen Agjabayov (from (Azerbaijan) Sabah)
7	MF	AZE	Asim Alizade (from (Latvia) BFC Daugavpils)
8	MF	AZE	Kamal Mirzayev (from (Azerbaijan) Gabala)
10	MF	AZE	Elvin Mammadov (from (Azerbaijan) Sumgayit)
11	FW	AZE	Kamran Guliyev (on loan from (Azerbaijan) Sabah)
17	MF	AZE	Elchin Rahimli (from (Azerbaijan) Sabail)
18	DF	AZE	Cəlal Hüseynov (on loan from (Azerbaijan) Zira)
22	DF	AZE	Elchin Mustafayev (from (Azerbaijan) Sabah)
27	DF	AZE	Ibrahim Aslanli (from (Azerbaijan) Sabail)
30	DF	AZE	Mirali Ahmadov (from (Azerbaijan) Sabah)
33	DF	AZE	Abdulla Rzayev (on loan from (Azerbaijan) Sabah)
55	DF	AZE	Adil Naghiyev (from (Azerbaijan) Sabail)
77	MF	AZE	Samir Gurbanov (from (Azerbaijan) Zira)
83	DF	AZE	Nihad Guliyev (from (Azerbaijan) Qarabağ)
88	MF	AZE	Bahruz Teymurov (from (Azerbaijan) Qaradağ Lökbatan)

Out: Note: Flags indicate national team as defined under FIFA eligibility rules; some limited exceptions apply. Players may hold more than one non-FIFA nationality.

No.	Pos.	Nation	Player
1	GK	MDA	Stanislav Namașco (to (Moldova) Bălți)
2	DF	AZE	Ilkin Qirtimov (to (Azerbaijan) Gabala)
3	DF	AZE	Tarlan Guliyev (to (Azerbaijan) Turan-Tovuz)
4	DF	AZE	Şehriyar Aliyev (to (Azerbaijan) Turan-Tovuz)
5	DF	AZE	Karim Diniyev
6	DF	ARG	Franco Flores
7	MF	AZE	Rahman Hajiyev (loan return to (Azerbaijan) Neftçi)
8	DF	AZE	Tural Akhundov (to (Azerbaijan) Kapaz)
9	MF	NGA	Nathan Oduwa (to (Azerbaijan) Shamakhi)
10	MF	BRA	Felipe Santos (to (Azerbaijan) Gabala)
13	MF	MLI	Sadio Tounkara
14	MF	AZE	Turan Valizade (loan return to (Azerbaijan) Neftçi)
18	DF	AZE	Ruslan Amirjanov
19	MF	AZE	Fahmin Muradbayli (loan return to (Azerbaijan) Neftçi)
50	MF	AZE	Samir Abdullayev (to (Azerbaijan) Sabail)
77	MF	GEO	Merab Gigauri (to (Georgia (country)) Torpedo Kutaisi)
85	GK	AZE	Kamal Bayramov (to (Azerbaijan) Turan-Tovuz)
99	MF	AZE	Rafael Maharramli (to (Azerbaijan) Sabail)

=== Sumgayit ===
In: Note: Flags indicate national team as defined under FIFA eligibility rules; some limited exceptions apply. Players may hold more than one non-FIFA nationality.

No.	Pos.	Nation	Player
5	DF	CPV	Steven Pereira (from (South Africa) Maritzburg United)
10	MF	AZE	Vusal Isgandarli (from (Turkey) Ankara Keçiörengücü)
12	DF	MKD	Todor Todoroski (from (Slovakia) ŠKF Sereď)
22	DF	SRB	Damjan Daničić (from (Croatia) Dinamo Zagreb)
23	MF	KAZ	Rifat Nurmugamet (from (Kazakhstan) Maktaaral)
30	MF	POR	Filipe Chaby (from (Portugal) Sporting CP)
37	FW	MLI	Alya Toure (on loan from (Turkey) İstanbul Başakşehir)
70	FW	TOG	Ouro-Nile Toure (from (Brazil) Assisense)

Out: Note: Flags indicate national team as defined under FIFA eligibility rules; some limited exceptions apply. Players may hold more than one non-FIFA nationality.

No.	Pos.	Nation	Player
1	GK	AZE	Tarlan Ahmadli (to (Azerbaijan) Turan-Tovuz)
2	DF	AZE	Dmitri Naghiyev (to (Ukraine) Inhulets Petrove)
4	DF	AZE	Hojjat Haghverdi (to (Iran) Tractor)
5	DF	RUS	Dzhamaldin Khodzhaniyazov (to (Russia) Akron Tolyatti)
7	MF	AZE	Tellur Mutallimov (to (Azerbaijan) Sabah)
9	FW	AZE	Ali Ghorbani (to (Iran) Foolad)
10	MF	AZE	Rahim Sadikhov (to (Azerbaijan) Zira)
23	GK	AZE	Andrey Popovich (loan return to (Ukraine) LNZ Cherkasy)
25	DF	AZE	Nabi Mammadov
33	MF	AZE	Eltun Turabov (loan return to (Azerbaijan) Sabah)
60	MF	AZE	Elvin Mammadov (to (Azerbaijan) Shamakhi)
74	DF	AZE	Yusif Nabiyev (to (Azerbaijan) Kapaz)
91	FW	AZE	Anatoliy Nuriyev (loan return to (Ukraine) Kolos Kovalivka)
98	DF	AZE	Emil Aliyev
—	DF	AZE	Arsen Agjabayov (loan return to (Azerbaijan) Sabah)

=== Turan-Tovuz ===
In: Note: Flags indicate national team as defined under FIFA eligibility rules; some limited exceptions apply. Players may hold more than one non-FIFA nationality.

No.	Pos.	Nation	Player
1	GK	AZE	Tarlan Ahmadli (from (Azerbaijan) Sumgayit)
3	DF	AZE	Tarlan Guliyev (from (Azerbaijan) Shamakhi)
4	DF	AZE	Şehriyar Aliyev (from (Azerbaijan) Shamakhi)
5	DF	BFA	Ben Aziz Dao (from (Burkina Faso) Douanes)
6	MF	AZE	Turan Valizade (on loan from (Azerbaijan) Neftçi)
7	MF	AZE	Ehtiram Shahverdiyev (from (Azerbaijan) Gabala)
8	MF	AZE	Shakir Seyidov (loan from (Azerbaijan) Sabah)
9	FW	GEO	Imeda Ashortia (from (Georgia (country)) Telavi)
10	MF	AZE	Khayal Najafov (on loan from (Azerbaijan) Neftçi)
11	MF	RUS	Aykhan Guseynov (from (Russia) Khimki-2)
13	MF	AZE	Nazim Hasanzada (from (Azerbaijan) Sabah)
15	MF	AZE	Vusal Masimov (from (Azerbaijan) Kapaz)
17	MF	NGA	Nathan Oduwa (from (Azerbaijan) Shamakhi)
19	FW	CMR	Rooney Wankewai (from (Greece) Apollon Pontus)
23	MF	NGA	Henry Okebugwu (from (Albania) Kastrioti)
30	MF	GEO	Piruz Marakvelidze (from (Georgia (country)) Telavi)
33	MF	AZE	Eltun Turabov (from (Azerbaijan) Sabah)
55	DF	RSA	Siyanda Xulu (from (Israel) Hapoel Tel Aviv)
77	MF	AZE	Javid Taghiyev (from (Azerbaijan) Sabail)
85	GK	AZE	Kamal Bayramov (from (Azerbaijan) Shamakhi)
99	MF	AZE	Veysal Rzayev (loan from (Azerbaijan) Sabah)

Out: Note: Flags indicate national team as defined under FIFA eligibility rules; some limited exceptions apply. Players may hold more than one non-FIFA nationality.

No.	Pos.	Nation	Player
—	MF	AZE	Aqshin Mukhtaroglu

=== Zira ===
In: Note: Flags indicate national team as defined under FIFA eligibility rules; some limited exceptions apply. Players may hold more than one non-FIFA nationality.

No.	Pos.	Nation	Player
5	DF	BEN	Moïse Adiléhou (from (Netherlands) NAC Breda)
7	FW	BRA	Filipe Pachtmann (from (Ukraine) Lviv, previously on loan)
10	MF	AZE	Rahim Sadikhov (from (Azerbaijan) Sumgayit)
11	FW	AZE	Rustam Akhmedzade (on loan from (Azerbaijan) Qarabağ)
17	FW	POR	Toni Gomes (from (Turkey) Menemenspor)
18	DF	AZE	Slavik Alkhasov (from (Azerbaijan) Sabah)
23	MF	SRB	Andrija Luković (from (Portugal) Belenenses SAD)
77	MF	AZE	Mirsahib Abbasov (from (Azerbaijan) Sabail)

Out: Note: Flags indicate national team as defined under FIFA eligibility rules; some limited exceptions apply. Players may hold more than one non-FIFA nationality.

No.	Pos.	Nation	Player
4	DF	AZE	Cəlal Hüseynov (on loan to (Azerbaijan) Shamakhi)
5	DF	AZE	Rahil Mammadov (loan return to (Azerbaijan) Qarabağ)
10	FW	AZE	Aghabala Ramazanov (to (Azerbaijan) Sabail)
18	FW	GEO	Davit Volkovi (to (Azerbaijan) Sabah)
92	MF	HAI	Bryan Alceus (to (Romania) Argeș Pitești)
99	MF	NGA	Ahmed Isaiah (to (Azerbaijan) Kapaz)
