= List of Azerbaijan football transfers summer 2021 =

This is a list of Azerbaijan football transfers in the summer transfer window, by club. Only clubs of the 2021–22 Azerbaijan Premier League are included.

== Azerbaijan Premier League 2021-22 ==
=== Gabala ===
In: Note: Flags indicate national team as defined under FIFA eligibility rules; some limited exceptions apply. Players may hold more than one non-FIFA nationality.

| No. | Pos. | Nation | Player |
|---|---|---|---|
| 1 | GK | CMR | Christophe Atangana (from (Spain) Bilbao Athletic) |
| 4 | DF | BRA | Ruan Renato (from (Brazil) Ponte Preta) |
| 5 | MF | ALB | Isnik Alimi (from (Italy) Atalanta) |
| 10 | MF | JOR | Omar Hani (from (Cyprus) APOEL) |
| 27 | DF | AZE | Magsad Isayev (from (Azerbaijan) Sabail) |
| 34 | DF | AZE | Urfan Abbasov (from (Azerbaijan) Sabail) |
| 94 | GK | AZE | Nijat Mehbaliyev (loan from (Azerbaijan) Sabah) |

Out: Note: Flags indicate national team as defined under FIFA eligibility rules; some limited exceptions apply. Players may hold more than one non-FIFA nationality.

| No. | Pos. | Nation | Player |
|---|---|---|---|
| 1 | GK | AZE | Anar Nazirov (to (Azerbaijan) Zira) |
| 2 | DF | CRO | Vinko Međimorec (to (Romania) UTA Arad) |
| 4 | DF | AZE | Sadig Guliyev |
| 5 | DF | AZE | Rasim Ramaldanov (Retired) |
| 7 | MF | AZE | Roman Huseynov (to (Azerbaijan) Sumgayit) |
| 13 | DF | ALB | Jurgen Goxha (to (Azerbaijan) Sabail) |
| 14 | MF | AZE | Javid Huseynov |
| 20 | DF | AZE | Faig Hajiyev |
| 32 | FW | SVN | Nicolas Rajsel (to (Azerbaijan) Sabail) |
| 55 | MF | AZE | Idris Ingilabli (loan return to (Azerbaijan) Sabah) |
| 74 | DF | AZE | Yusif Nabiyev (to (Azerbaijan) Sumgayit) |
| 77 | MF | GEO | Merab Gigauri (to (Azerbaijan) Keşla) |
| 94 | GK | AZE | Tarlan Ahmadli (to (Azerbaijan) Sumgayit) |
| 99 | FW | NGA | James Adeniyi (to (Israel) Maccabi Petah Tikva) |
| — | MF | AZE | Samir Maharramli (loan return to (Azerbaijan) Sabah) |

=== Keşla ===
In: Note: Flags indicate national team as defined under FIFA eligibility rules; some limited exceptions apply. Players may hold more than one non-FIFA nationality.

| No. | Pos. | Nation | Player |
|---|---|---|---|
| 5 | DF | AZE | Karim Diniyev (from (Azerbaijan) Zira) |
| 7 | MF | AZE | Rahman Hajiyev (loan from (Azerbaijan) Neftçi extended) |
| 10 | FW | BRA | Felipe Santos (from (Slovenia) Maribor) |
| 14 | MF | AZE | Turan Valizade (on loan from (Azerbaijan) Neftçi) |
| 17 | MF | SEN | Oumar Goudiaby (from (North Macedonia) Pelister) |
| 22 | DF | AZE | Elçin Mustafayev (from (Azerbaijan) Sabah, previously on loan) |
| 29 | FW | AZE | Amil Yunanov (from (Azerbaijan) Sabail) |
| 72 | FW | ANG | Aldair Neto (from (North Macedonia) Pelister) |
| 77 | MF | GEO | Merab Gigauri (from (Azerbaijan) Gabala) |
| 99 | MF | AZE | Rafael Maharramli (from (Azerbaijan) Qarabağ, previously on loan) |

Out: Note: Flags indicate national team as defined under FIFA eligibility rules; some limited exceptions apply. Players may hold more than one non-FIFA nationality.

| No. | Pos. | Nation | Player |
|---|---|---|---|
| 10 | MF | PAR | César Meza (to (Azerbaijan) Neftçi) |
| 11 | FW | BRA | Sílvio (to (United Arab Emirates) Al Dhaid) |
| 17 | MF | AZE | Vusal Isgandarli (to (Turkey) Ankara Keçiörengücü) |
| 25 | MF | SLE | John Kamara |
| 29 | MF | MDA | Eugeniu Cociuc (to (Moldova) Zimbru Chișinău) |
| 32 | DF | AZE | Elvin Yunuszade |
| 42 | FW | ANG | Alexander Christovão |
| 90 | MF | AZE | Orkhan Farajov (to (Azerbaijan) Sabail) |
| 91 | MF | MLI | Sadio Tounkara |
| 97 | FW | AZE | Khazar Mahmudov (to (Azerbaijan) Sumgayit) |

=== Neftçi ===
In: Note: Flags indicate national team as defined under FIFA eligibility rules; some limited exceptions apply. Players may hold more than one non-FIFA nationality.

| No. | Pos. | Nation | Player |
|---|---|---|---|
| 4 | DF | POR | Hugo Basto (from (Portugal) Estoril) |
| 7 | MF | ARG | Jorge Correa (from (Portugal) Marítimo) |
| 9 | FW | BRA | Tiago Bezerra (from (Qatar) Al-Sailiya) |
| 10 | MF | PAR | César Meza (from (Azerbaijan) Keşla) |
| 11 | FW | STP | Harramiz (from (Portugal) Estoril) |
| 14 | MF | FRA | Romain Basque (from (France) Le Havre) |
| 36 | MF | GUI | Mamadou Kané (loan from (Greece) Olympiacos) |
| 91 | FW | BRA | Ramon Machado (from (Brazil) Brasil de Pelotas) |
| 97 | MF | AZE | Khayal Najafov (from (Azerbaijan) Sumgayit) |

Out: Note: Flags indicate national team as defined under FIFA eligibility rules; some limited exceptions apply. Players may hold more than one non-FIFA nationality.

| No. | Pos. | Nation | Player |
|---|---|---|---|
| 1 | GK | AZE | Salahat Aghayev (to (Azerbaijan) Sabah) |
| 2 | DF | AZE | Jabir Amirli (to (Azerbaijan) Sabail) |
| 4 | MF | JPN | Keisuke Honda (to (Lithuania) Sūduva) |
| 5 | DF | AZE | Anton Krivotsyuk (to (Poland) Wisła Płock) |
| 7 | MF | AZE | Namik Alaskarov (to (Turkey) Bursaspor) |
| 9 | FW | BUL | Ahmed Ahmedov (loan return to (Bulgaria) CSKA Sofia) |
| 17 | MF | ALB | Bruno Telushi (to (Albania) Egnatia) |
| 29 | FW | FRA | Steeven Joseph-Monrose (to (Greece) Xanthi) |
| 33 | MF | AZE | Turan Valizade (on loan to (Azerbaijan) Keşla) |
| 36 | MF | GUI | Mamadou Kané (to (Greece) Olympiacos) |
| 49 | DF | BRA | Rener Pavão (to (Portugal) Portimonense) |
| 56 | DF | AZE | Elton Alibeyli (loan to (Azerbaijan) Sabail) |
| 91 | DF | BRA | Thallyson |
| — | MF | AZE | Rahman Hajiyev (loan to (Azerbaijan) Keşla extended) |

=== Qarabağ ===
In: Note: Flags indicate national team as defined under FIFA eligibility rules; some limited exceptions apply. Players may hold more than one non-FIFA nationality.

| No. | Pos. | Nation | Player |
|---|---|---|---|
| 7 | MF | AZE | Richard Almeida (from (Azerbaijan) Zira) |
| 17 | MF | ESP | Gaspar Panadero (from (Spain) Cádiz) |
| 20 | MF | BRA | Kady (from (Portugal) Vilafranquense) |
| 22 | MF | AZE | Musa Gurbanli (loan return from (Azerbaijan) Zira) |
| 25 | FW | SEN | Ibrahima Wadji (from (Norway) Haugesund) |
| 29 | DF | MNE | Marko Vešović (from (Poland) Legia Warsaw) |
| 77 | FW | AZE | Ramil Sheydayev (from (Azerbaijan) Sabah) |
| 89 | GK | AZE | Amin Ramazanov (from (Russia) Lokomotiv Moscow) |

Out: Note: Flags indicate national team as defined under FIFA eligibility rules; some limited exceptions apply. Players may hold more than one non-FIFA nationality.

| No. | Pos. | Nation | Player |
|---|---|---|---|
| 8 | MF | SRB | Uroš Matić (to (Saudi Arabia) Abha Club) |
| 11 | FW | AZE | Mahir Emreli (to (Poland) Legia Warsaw) |
| — | MF | AZE | Hajiagha Hajili (loan extended (Azerbaijan) Zira) |
| — | MF | AZE | Rafael Maharramli (to (Azerbaijan) Keşla, previously on loan) |
| — | MF | AZE | Ruslan Hajiyev (loan extended to (Azerbaijan) Sabail) |

=== Sabah ===
In: Note: Flags indicate national team as defined under FIFA eligibility rules; some limited exceptions apply. Players may hold more than one non-FIFA nationality.

| No. | Pos. | Nation | Player |
|---|---|---|---|
| 1 | GK | AZE | Salahat Aghayev (from (Azerbaijan) Neftçi) |
| 4 | MF | AZE | Elvin Jamalov (from (Azerbaijan) Zira) |
| 7 | FW | SRB | Petar Škuletić (from (France) Montpellier) |
| 11 | MF | ESP | Cristian Ceballos (from Qatar) |
| 17 | MF | ESP | Juan Cámara (loan from (Poland) Jagiellonia Białystok) |
| 20 | MF | GER | Joy-Lance Mickels (from (Netherlands) MVV Maastricht) |
| 21 | MF | AZE | Ildar Alekperov (from (Russia) Neftekhimik Nizhnekamsk) |
| 24 | FW | GEO | Mikheil Ergemlidze (from (Georgia (country)) Dinamo Tbilisi) |
| 55 | DF | CRO | Špiro Peričić (from (Slovenia) Maribor) |

Out: Note: Flags indicate national team as defined under FIFA eligibility rules; some limited exceptions apply. Players may hold more than one non-FIFA nationality.

| No. | Pos. | Nation | Player |
|---|---|---|---|
| 7 | MF | AZE | Joshgun Diniyev (to (Azerbaijan) Zira) |
| 8 | MF | AZE | Elshan Abdullayev (to (Azerbaijan) Sabail) |
| 12 | GK | URU | Álvaro Villete (loan return to (Colombia) Patriotas) |
| 13 | DF | SRB | Filip Ivanović (to (Albania) Teuta) |
| 15 | DF | AZE | Ruslan Abyshov (to (Azerbaijan) Zira) |
| 17 | DF | AZE | Mahammad Mirzabeyov (to (Azerbaijan) Sabail) |
| 19 | DF | AZE | Tamkin Khalilzade (to (Azerbaijan) Zira) |
| 23 | MF | GUI | Amadou Diallo |
| 28 | FW | CGO | Kévin Koubemba (to (Albania) Teuta) |
| 30 | MF | CRO | Mario Marina (to (Croatia) Slaven Belupo) |
| 48 | MF | UKR | Dmytro Klyots (to (Ukraine) Veres Rivne) |
| 77 | MF | AZE | Javid Taghiyev (to (Azerbaijan) Sabail) |
| 90 | FW | AZE | Ramil Sheydayev (to (Azerbaijan) Qarabağ) |
| 94 | GK | AZE | Nijat Mehbaliyev (loan to (Azerbaijan) Gabala) |
| — | DF | AZE | Elçin Mustafayev (to (Azerbaijan) Keşla, previously on loan) |
| — | MF | AZE | Eltun Turabov (loan to (Azerbaijan) Sumgayit) |
| — | MF | AZE | Ozan Kökçü (to (Netherlands) Telstar) |

=== Sabail ===
In: Note: Flags indicate national team as defined under FIFA eligibility rules; some limited exceptions apply. Players may hold more than one non-FIFA nationality.

| No. | Pos. | Nation | Player |
|---|---|---|---|
| 2 | DF | AZE | Elton Alibeyli (loan from (Azerbaijan) Neftçi) |
| 6 | DF | AZE | Jabir Amirli (from (Azerbaijan) Neftçi) |
| 8 | MF | AZE | Elshan Abdullayev (from (Azerbaijan) Sabah) |
| 10 | MF | AZE | Javid Taghiyev (from (Azerbaijan) Sabah) |
| 13 | DF | AZE | Shahriyar Rahimov (from (Azerbaijan) Zira) |
| 19 | MF | AZE | Ruslan Hajiyev (loan extended from (Azerbaijan) Qarabağ) |
| 20 | MF | AZE | Orkhan Farajov (from (Azerbaijan) Keşla) |
| 21 | DF | AZE | Mahammad Mirzabeyov (from (Azerbaijan) Sabah) |
| 30 | DF | GHA | Jamal Arago (from (Kosovo) Drita) |
| 32 | FW | SVN | Nicolas Rajsel (from (Azerbaijan) Gabala) |
| 33 | MF | LTU | Domantas Šimkus (from (Israel) Hapoel Kfar Saba) |
| 34 | DF | ALB | Jurgen Goxha (from (Azerbaijan) Gabala) |
| 88 | MF | AZE | Elmir Tagiyev (from (Azerbaijan) Turan-Tovuz) |

Out: Note: Flags indicate national team as defined under FIFA eligibility rules; some limited exceptions apply. Players may hold more than one non-FIFA nationality.

| No. | Pos. | Nation | Player |
|---|---|---|---|
| 9 | FW | MKD | Florijan Kadriu |
| 4 | DF | SLE | Alie Sesay (to (Indonesia) Persebaya Surabaya) |
| 19 | FW | GEO | Luka Imnadze (to (Kazakhstan) Akzhayik) |
| 23 | MF | MKD | Milovan Petrovikj |
| 27 | MF | RSA | Hendrick Ekstein |
| 28 | DF | AZE | Magsad Isayev (to (Azerbaijan) Gabala) |
| 29 | FW | AZE | Amil Yunanov (to (Azerbaijan) Keşla) |
| 34 | DF | AZE | Urfan Abbasov (to (Azerbaijan) Gabala) |
| 96 | GK | GUA | Nicholas Hagen (to (Norway) HamKam) |

=== Sumgayit ===
In: Note: Flags indicate national team as defined under FIFA eligibility rules; some limited exceptions apply. Players may hold more than one non-FIFA nationality.

| No. | Pos. | Nation | Player |
|---|---|---|---|
| 1 | GK | AZE | Tarlan Ahmadli (from (Azerbaijan) Gabala) |
| 19 | FW | AZE | Khazar Mahmudov (from (Azerbaijan) Keşla) |
| 20 | MF | AZE | Roman Huseynov (from (Azerbaijan) Gabala) |
| 33 | MF | AZE | Eltun Turabov (from (Azerbaijan) Sabah, previously on loan) |
| 74 | DF | AZE | Yusif Nabiyev (from (Azerbaijan) Gabala) |

Out: Note: Flags indicate national team as defined under FIFA eligibility rules; some limited exceptions apply. Players may hold more than one non-FIFA nationality.

| No. | Pos. | Nation | Player |
|---|---|---|---|
| 1 | GK | AZE | Mehdi Jannatov (to (Azerbaijan) Zira) |
| 11 | FW | IRN | Mehdi Sharifi |
| 21 | DF | AZE | Jabir Amirli (loan return to (Azerbaijan) Neftçi) |
| 22 | MF | AZE | Javid Imamverdiyev (to (Azerbaijan) Kapaz) |
| 97 | MF | AZE | Khayal Najafov (to (Azerbaijan) Neftçi) |

=== Zira ===
In: Note: Flags indicate national team as defined under FIFA eligibility rules; some limited exceptions apply. Players may hold more than one non-FIFA nationality.

| No. | Pos. | Nation | Player |
|---|---|---|---|
| 1 | GK | AZE | Mehdi Jannatov (from (Azerbaijan) Sumgayit) |
| 9 | MF | BEL | Loris Brogno (from (Belgium) K Beerschot VA) |
| 11 | FW | BRA | Welves (loan from (Ukraine) Lviv) |
| 13 | MF | AZE | Ramin Ahmadov (from (Azerbaijan) Zagatala) |
| 15 | DF | AZE | Ruslan Abishov (from (Azerbaijan) Sabah) |
| 19 | DF | AZE | Tamkin Khalilzade (from (Azerbaijan) Sabah) |
| 21 | MF | AZE | Hajiagha Hajili (loan extended from (Azerbaijan) Qarabağ) |
| 41 | GK | AZE | Anar Nazirov (from (Azerbaijan) Gabala) |
| 47 | FW | NED | Mo Hamdaoui (from (Netherlands) De Graafschap) |
| 51 | DF | AZE | Rustam Nuriyev (from (Azerbaijan) Zagatala) |
| 77 | FW | AZE | Samir Gurbanov (from (Azerbaijan) Kapaz) |
| 88 | MF | MKD | Gjorgi Stoilov (from (North Macedonia) Akademija Pandev) |
| 99 | FW | BRA | Filipe Pachtmann (loan from (Ukraine) Lviv) |
| — | MF | AZE | Joshgun Diniyev (from (Azerbaijan) Sabah) |

Out: Note: Flags indicate national team as defined under FIFA eligibility rules; some limited exceptions apply. Players may hold more than one non-FIFA nationality.

| No. | Pos. | Nation | Player |
|---|---|---|---|
| 1 | GK | BRA | Matheus Albino |
| 4 | MF | AZE | Elvin Jamalov (to (Azerbaijan) Sabah) |
| 5 | DF | AZE | Karim Diniyev (to (Azerbaijan) Keşla) |
| 7 | MF | AZE | Tural Bayramli (to (Greece) Pierikos) |
| 11 | FW | MOZ | Clésio (to (Portugal) Marítimo) |
| 12 | DF | SRB | Lazar Đorđević (to (Bahrain) Al Khalidiya) |
| 13 | DF | AZE | Shahriyar Rahimov (to (Azerbaijan) Sabail) |
| 14 | FW | ARG | Facundo Melivilo |
| 17 | FW | CMR | Rodrigue Bongongui |
| 30 | MF | AZE | Richard Almeida (to (Azerbaijan) Qarabağ) |
| 91 | FW | AZE | Ruslan Gurbanov (to (Belarus) Slavia Mozyr) |
