= 2021–22 Sabail FK season =

Sabail
2021-22 season
- Chairman: Rashad Abdullayev
- Manager: Aftandil Hajiyev
- Stadium: ASCO Arena
- Premier League: 8th
- Azerbaijan Cup: Quarterfinal vs Zira
- Top goalscorer: League: Nicolas Rajsel (5); All: Nicolas Rajsel (5)
Home colours	Away colours

The Sabail FK 2021–22 season was Sabail's fifth Azerbaijan Premier League season, and their sixth season in existence. They will compete in the Premier League and the Azerbaijan Cup.

== Season events ==
On 22 June, Shahriyar Rahimov signed for Sabail from Zira.

On 2 July, Mahammad Mirzabeyov signed for Sabail from Sabah.

On 9 July, Jabir Amirli signed for Sabail from Neftçi.

On 15 July, Javid Taghiyev signed for Sabail from Sabah.

On 29 July, Domantas Šimkus signed for Sabail from Hapoel Kfar Saba.

On 7 August, Jurgen Goxha signed for Sabail from Gabala. Two days later, 9 August, Elmir Tagiyev signed for Sabail from Turan-Tovuz.

On 11 August, Sabail announced the signings of Orkhan Farajov from Keşla and Jamal Arago from Drita, whilst Ruslan Hajiyev re-joined the club on another season-long loan deal from Qarabağ.

On 19 August, Sabail announced the season-long loan signing of Elton Alibeyli from Neftçi.

On 6 September, Sabail announced the signing of Nicolas Rajsel to a one-year contract.

On 7 January, Elshan Abdullayev was released, and Elton Alibeyli return to Neftçi after his loan deal was ended early.

On 11 January, Kamran Agayev announced his retirement from football.

On 21 January, Sabail extended their contract with Turan Manafov for an additional year, before loaning him to Olympiacos Volos until the end of the season.

On 4 February, Sabail announced the loan signing of Rashad Azizli from Zira until the end of the season, with Huseynali Guliyev joining from Sumgayit the following day on a contract until the summer of 2023.

== Squad ==
As of match played 21 May 2022

No.	Name	Nationality	Position	Date of birth (age)	Signed from	Signed in	Contract ends	Apps.	Goals
Goalkeepers
1	Rashad Azizli	(Azerbaijan)	GK	1 January 1994 (aged 28)	loan from Zira	2022	2022	10	0
12	Huseynali Guliyev	(Azerbaijan)	GK	11 August 1999 (aged 22)	Sumgayit	2022	2022	6	0
25	Elkhan Ahmadov	(Azerbaijan)	GK	2 July 1993 (aged 28)	Mil-Muğan	2017		17	0
Defenders
5	Adil Naghiyev	(Azerbaijan)	DF	11 September 1995 (aged 26)	Sumgayit	2019		71	3
6	Jabir Amirli	(Azerbaijan)	DF	6 January 1997 (aged 25)	Neftçi	2021		28	1
13	Shahriyar Rahimov	(Azerbaijan)	DF	6 April 1989 (aged 33)	Zira	2021		50	2
21	Mahammad Mirzabeyov	(Azerbaijan)	DF	16 November 1990 (aged 31)	Sabah	2021		23	0
26	Kamal Gurbanov	(Azerbaijan)	DF	6 May 1994 (aged 28)	Neftchi Baku	2017		38	0
30	Jamal Arago	(Liberia)	DF	28 August 1993 (aged 28)	Drita	2021		28	1
34	Jurgen Goxha	(Albania)	DF	29 December 1992 (aged 29)	Gabala	2021		20	2
66	Ibrahim Aslanli	(Azerbaijan)	DF	1 December 1996 (aged 25)	Zira	2021		9	1
Midfielders
7	Mirsahib Abbasov	(Azerbaijan)	MF	19 January 1993 (aged 29)	Zira	2019		50	4
10	Javid Taghiyev	(Azerbaijan)	MF	22 July 1992 (aged 29)	Sabah	2021		25	0
14	Rahid Amirguliyev	(Azerbaijan)	MF	1 September 1989 (aged 32)	Qarabağ	2018		104	1
17	Elchin Rahimli	(Azerbaijan)	MF	17 June 1996 (aged 25)	Qarabağ	2018		45	0
19	Ruslan Hajiyev	(Azerbaijan)	MF	20 March 1998 (aged 24)	loan from Qarabağ	2021	2022	41	1
20	Orkhan Farajov	(Azerbaijan)	MF	7 January 2001 (aged 21)	Keşla	2021		1	0
22	Afran Ismayilov	(Azerbaijan)	MF	8 October 1988 (aged 33)	Keşla	2020		38	6
27	Rasim Hasanov	(Ukraine)	MF	16 March 2003 (aged 19)	Academy	2021		1	0
33	Domantas Šimkus	(Lithuania)	MF	10 February 1996 (aged 26)	Hapoel Kfar Saba	2021		26	1
38	Zeynəddin Abdurahmanov	(Azerbaijan)	MF	23 September 2002 (aged 19)	Academy	2020		1	0
39	Tural Bayramli	(Azerbaijan)	MF	7 January 1998 (aged 24)	Pierikos	2022		9	0
70	Elsad Tagiyev	(Azerbaijan)	MF	15 June 2001 (aged 20)	Academy	2021		1	0
77	Adilkhan Garahmadov	(Azerbaijan)	MF	5 June 2001 (aged 20)	Academy	2018		55	2
88	Elmir Tagiyev	(Azerbaijan)	MF	23 May 2000 (aged 21)	Turan-Tovuz	2021		13	0
Forwards
11	Rauf Aliyev	(Azerbaijan)	FW	12 February 1989 (aged 33)	Neftçi	2020		54	9
32	Nicolas Rajsel	(Slovenia)	FW	31 May 1993 (aged 28)	Unattached	2021	2022	21	5
99	Vidadi Cəfərov	(Azerbaijan)	FW	25 August 2000 (aged 21)	Academy	2021		4	0
Out on loan
3	Turan Manafov	(Azerbaijan)	DF	19 September 1998 (aged 23)	Zagatala	2019	2022	61	2
Left during the season
1	Kamran Agayev	(Azerbaijan)	GK	9 February 1986 (aged 36)	Unattached	2020		12	0
2	Elton Alibeyli	(Azerbaijan)	DF	4 February 2000 (aged 22)	loan from Neftçi	2021	2022	4	0
8	Elshan Abdullayev	(Azerbaijan)	MF	5 February 1994 (aged 28)	Sabah	2021		3	0
31	Nail Alishov	(Azerbaijan)	GK	30 July 2000 (aged 21)	Zira	2021		1	0

=== Out on loan ===
Note: Flags indicate national team as defined under FIFA eligibility rules; some limited exceptions apply. Players may hold more than one non-FIFA nationality.

No.	Pos.	Nation	Player
3	DF	AZE	Turan Manafov (at Olympiacos Volos)

== Transfers ==
=== In ===
Date	Position	Nationality	Name	From	Fee	Ref.
22 June 2021	DF	(Azerbaijan)	Shahriyar Rahimov	Zira	Undisclosed	
2 July 2021	DF	(Azerbaijan)	Mahammad Mirzabeyov	Sabah	Undisclosed	
9 July 2021	DF	(Azerbaijan)	Jabir Amirli	Neftçi	Undisclosed	
15 July 2021	MF	(Azerbaijan)	Elshan Abdullayev	Sabah	Undisclosed	
15 July 2021	MF	(Azerbaijan)	Javid Taghiyev	Sabah	Undisclosed	
29 July 2021	MF	(Lithuania)	Domantas Šimkus	Hapoel Kfar Saba	Undisclosed	
7 August 2021	DF	(Albania)	Jurgen Goxha	Gabala	Undisclosed	
9 August 2021	MF	(Azerbaijan)	Elmir Tagiyev	Turan-Tovuz	Undisclosed	
11 August 2021	DF	(Liberia)	Jamal Arago	Drita	Undisclosed	
11 August 2021	MF	(Azerbaijan)	Orkhan Farajov	Keşla	Undisclosed	
6 September 2021	FW	(Slovenia)	Nicolas Rajsel	Unattached	Free	
13 January 2022	MF	(Azerbaijan)	Tural Bayramli	Pierikos	Undisclosed	
5 January 2022	GK	(Azerbaijan)	Huseynali Guliyev	Sumgayit	Undisclosed	

=== Loans in ===
Date from	Position	Nationality	Name	From	Date to	Ref.
11 August 2021	MF	(Azerbaijan)	Ruslan Hajiyev	Qarabağ	End of season	
19 August 2021	DF	(Azerbaijan)	Elton Alibeyli	Neftçi	7 January 2022	
4 January 2022	GK	(Azerbaijan)	Rashad Azizli	Zira	End of season	

=== Loans out ===
Date from	Position	Nationality	Name	To	Date to	Ref.
21 January 2022	DF	(Azerbaijan)	Turan Manafov	Olympiacos Volos	End of season	

=== Released ===
Date	Position	Nationality	Name	Joined	Date	Ref
30 June 2021	GK	(Azerbaijan)	Shahin Zakiyev	Mamry Gizycko	1 September 2021	
15 July 2021	GK	(Guatemala)	Nicholas Hagen	HamKam	30 July 2021	
15 July 2021	MF	(South Africa)	Hendrick Ekstein	AmaZulu	16 August 2021	
7 January 2022	MF	(Azerbaijan)	Elshan Abdullayev	Sumgayit	11 January 2022	
11 January 2022	GK	(Azerbaijan)	Kamran Agayev	Retired		
7 February 2022	GK	(Azerbaijan)	Nail Alishov			
27 May 2022	MF	(Lithuania)	Domantas Šimkus	Mura		
27 May 2022	FW	(Slovenia)	Nicolas Rajsel	FCV Dender EH		
31 May 2022	GK	(Azerbaijan)	Elkhan Ahmadov			
31 May 2022	DF	(Albania)	Jurgen Goxha	Egnatia		
31 May 2022	DF	(Azerbaijan)	Ibrahim Aslanli	Shamakhi		
31 May 2022	DF	(Azerbaijan)	Mahammad Mirzabeyov	Turan Tovuz		
31 May 2022	DF	(Liberia)	Jamal Arago	Ohod	26 July 2022	
31 May 2022	MF	(Azerbaijan)	Elchin Rahimli	Shamakhi		
31 May 2022	MF	(Azerbaijan)	Javid Taghiyev	Turan Tovuz		
31 May 2022	FW	(Azerbaijan)	Rauf Aliyev	Kapaz		

== Friendlies ==
21 July 2021	Sabail	2 – 3	Gabala	Baku
AZT (UTC+4)	(pen.)	Report	Isgandarov (pen.); Hajiyev (o.g.)	Stadium: Baku Olympic Stadium

14 January 2022	Sabail	0 – 0	Qarabağ-2	Baku
AZT (UTC+4)		Report		Stadium: Dalga Arena

18 January 2022	Sabail	0 – 2	Keşla	Baku
AZT (UTC+4)		Report	Yunanov; G.Safarov	Stadium: Dalga Arena

21 January 2022	Sabail	3 – 1	MOIK Baku	Baku
AZT (UTC+4)	Taghiyev 19'; Hajiyev 28'; Arago 58'	Report	Goal	Stadium: Dalga Arena

24 January 2022	Sabail	1 – 1	Keşla	Baku
15:00 AZT (UTC+4)	Goal	Report	Hajiyev	Stadium: Baku Olympic Stadium Training Field

== Competitions ==
=== Overview ===
Competition	First match	Last match	Starting round	Final position	Record							
Competition	First match	Last match	Starting round	Final position	Pld	W	D	L	GF	GA	GD	Win %
Premier League	14 August 2021	21 May 2022	Matchday 1	8th	28	4	3	21	17	57	−40	14.29
Azerbaijan Cup	10 December 2021	13 February 2022	First Round	Quarterfinal	3	1	0	2	4	8	−4	33.33
Total					31	5	3	23	21	65	−44	16.13

Last updated: 21 May 2022
Source: Competitions

=== Premier League ===
==== Results summary ====
Overall								Home						Away					
Pld	W	D	L	GF	GA	GD	Pts	W	D	L	GF	GA	GD	W	D	L	GF	GA	GD
28	4	3	21	17	57	−40	15	3	1	10	11	24	−13	1	2	11	6	33	−27

Last updated: 21 May 2022.
Source: See Results

==== Results by round ====
Round	1	2	3	4	5	6	7	8	9	10	11	12	13	14	15	16	17	18	19	20	21	22	23	24	25	26	27	28
Ground	A	A	H	A	H	H	H	A	A	H	A	A	A	H	H	A	H	A	H	A	A	H	A	H	A	H	H	A
Result	W	L	W	L	L	L	L	W	L	L	L	L	D	L	D	L	L	L	L	L	L	W	L	L	D	L	L	L
Position	2	5	3	4	6	6	7	5	6	7	8	8	8	8	8	8	8	8	8	8	8	8	8	8	8	8	8	8

Updated to match(es) played on 21 May 2022. Source: See Results
A = Away; H = Home; W = Win; D = Draw; L = Loss

==== Results ====
14 August 2021 1	Sabah	0 – 1	Sabail	Masazır
18:30 AZT (UTC+4)	S.Seyidov (yellow card) 45+2'; Seydiyev (yellow card) 45+2'; Mickels (yellow card) 75' (yellow-red card) 90+2'	Report	Goxha 30' (yellow card) 36'	Stadium: Bank Respublika Arena; Referee: Raad Ahmədov

22 August 2021 2	Qarabağ	3 – 0	Sabail	Baku
20:30 AZT (UTC+4)	Gurbanli 30', 45+2'; Ozobić (yellow card) 69' (goal) 76'	Report	Goxha (yellow card) 90+3'; Hajiyev (yellow card) 90+5'	Stadium: Azersun Arena; Referee: Elcin Masiyev

12 September 2021 3	Sabail	1 – 0	Sumgayit	Baku
18:00 AZT (UTC+4)	Naghiyev (yellow card) 19'; Goxha (yellow card) 45+3'; Amirli 64'	Report	Ghorbani (yellow card) 23'; Bayramov (yellow card) 64'; Abdullazade (yellow card) 75'	Stadium: Bayil Arena; Referee: Vugar Hasanli

18 September 2021 4	Gabala	5 – 0	Sabail	Qabala
17:00 AZT (UTC+4)	Utzig (yellow card) 22' (goal) 90+1'; Vukčević (yellow card) 34'; Mammadov (yellow card) 35'; Muradov 65'; Alimi (yellow card) 81' (goal) 90+5'; Isgandarov 84'; Shahverdiyev 89'	Report	Aliyev (yellow card) 3'; Šimkus (yellow card) 52'; Garahmadov (yellow card) 81' (yellow-red card) 86'	Stadium: Gabala City Stadium; Referee: Rauf Allahverdiyev

25 September 2021 5	Sabail	1 – 2	Zira	Baku
19:15 AZT (UTC+4)	Goxha 45'; E.Tagiyev (yellow card) 64'; Amirguliyev (yellow card) 69'; Taghiyev (yellow card) 90+1'	Report	Volkovi 17', 40'; Khalilzade (yellow card) 22'; Stoilov (yellow card) 47'; Hajili (yellow card) 67'; Aliyev (yellow card) 83'	Stadium: Bayil Arena; Referee: Kamal Umudlu

2 October 2021 6	Sabail	1 – 3	Neftçi	Baku
19:15 AZT (UTC+4)	Naghiyev (yellow card) 41'; Amirli (yellow card) 66'; Rajsel 90+5'	Report	Lawal 26'; Çelik (yellow card) 38'; Tiago Bezerra 45+1', 78'	Stadium: Bayil Arena; Referee: Vugar Hasanli

16 October 2021 7	Sabail	1 – 2	Keşla	Baku
15:00 AZT (UTC+4)	Manafov (yellow card) 34'; Arago (yellow card) 36'; Aliyev (yellow card) 67' (goal) 71'	Report	Felipe Santos (yellow card) 60'; Guliyev 68'; Abang 81' (yellow card) 86'; Namașco (yellow card) 90+2'	Stadium: Bayil Arena; Referee: Rauf Jabarov

25 October 2021 8	Sabail	3 – 1	Qarabağ	Baku
19:00 AZT (UTC+4)	Šimkus (yellow card) 26'; Rajsel 33'; Goxha (yellow card) 26'; Abbasov 42'; Rahimli (yellow card) 66'; Naghiyev (yellow card) 69'; Manafov 90+1'; Farajov (yellow card) 90+1'	Report	Kady 65'; Mustafazade (yellow card) 89'	Stadium: Bayil Arena; Referee: Rauf Allahverdiyev

31 October 2021 9	Sumgayit	2 – 0	Sabail	Sumgait
18:15 AZT (UTC+4)	Sadikhov 37'; Haghverdi (yellow card) 63'; S.Bagherpasand 74'	Report	Aliyev (yellow card) 15'; Rajsel (red card) 63'	Stadium: Kapital Bank Arena; Referee: Farid Haciyev

7 November 2021 10	Sabail	0 – 2	Gabala	Bayil
15:00 AZT (UTC+4)	V.Cəfərov (yellow card) 20'; Mirzabeyov (yellow card) 30'; Goxha (yellow card) 56' (yellow-red card) 56'	Report	Isgandarov (yellow card) 46'; López (yellow card) 80'; E.Səfərov (yellow card) 85' (goal) 88'; Isayev 90+5'	Stadium: Bayil Arena; Referee: Ravan Hamzazada

20 November 2021 11	Zira	3 – 1	Sabail	Zirə
16:00 AZT (UTC+4)	Aliyev 23'; Volkovi 47'; Brogno 74'	Report	Arago (yellow card) 49'; Aliyev 87' (pen.)	Stadium: Zira Olympic Sport Complex Stadium; Referee: Aliyar Ağayev

27 November 2021 12	Neftçi	1 – 0	Sabail	Baku
18:15 AZT (UTC+4)	V.Asgarov 52'; Çelik (yellow card) 90'	Report	Rahimli (yellow card) 47'	Stadium: Eighth Kilometer District Stadium; Referee: Elcin Masiyev

4 December 2021 13	Keşla	2 – 2	Sabail	Baku
16:00 AZT (UTC+4)	Abang (yellow card) 1' (yellow-red card) 61' (goal) 46'; Felipe Santos 45+6' (pen.) (yellow card) 77'; Kamara (yellow card) 75'; Namașco (yellow card) 90'	Report	Amirli (yellow card) 18'; Manafov (yellow card) 23'; Amirguliyev 66'; Arago 90+5'; Alishov (yellow card) 90+5'	Stadium: ASK Arena; Referee: Rauf Jabarov

16 December 2021 14	Sabail	0 – 3	Sabah	Baku
16:30 AZT (UTC+4)	Goxha (yellow card) 40'; Abbasov (yellow card) 45'; Naghiyev (yellow card) 72'	Report	K.Quliyev (yellow card) 1'; Mickels 33' (yellow card) 36'; Nuriyev 46'; Isayev (yellow card) 86'; Cámara 90+4'	Stadium: Bayil Arena; Referee: Elcin Masiyev

8 February 2022 15	Sabail	1 – 1	Sumgayit	Bayil
19:15 AZT (UTC+4)	Šimkus 17'; Amirguliyev (yellow card) 48'	Report	Mustafayev (yellow card) 31'; Arago 65' (o.g.); Naghiyev (yellow card) 67'; Ghorbani (yellow card) 76'; Sadikhov (yellow card) 89'	Stadium: Bayil Arena; Referee: Ravan Hamzazada

19 February 2022 16	Gabala	2 – 0	Sabail	Qabala
15:00 AZT (UTC+4)	Utzig (yellow card) 75'; Isgandarov 78'; Alimi 90+7'	Report	Goxha (yellow card) 3'; Arago (yellow card) 39'; Mirzabeyov (yellow card) 75'	Stadium: Gabala City Stadium; Referee: Rauf Jabarov

28 February 2022 17	Sabail	0 – 1	Zira	Bayil
17:00 AZT (UTC+4)	Bayramli (yellow card) 54'; Naghiyev (yellow card) 66'; Abbasov (yellow card) 79'; Arago (yellow card) 84'	Report	Ramazanov 45+2' (yellow card) 47'; Khalilzade (yellow card) 53'	Stadium: Bayil Arena; Referee: Elcin Masiyev

5 March 2022 18	Neftçi	2 – 0	Sabail	Baku
19:15 AZT (UTC+4)	Bezerra 73'; Salahlı 79'	Report	Mirzabeyov (yellow card) 14'; Bayramli (yellow card) 60'; Goxha (yellow card) 86'; Naghiyev (yellow card) 87'	Stadium: Eighth Kilometer District Stadium; Referee: Kamal Umudlu

12 March 2022 19	Sabail	0 – 3	Keşla	Bayil
16:45 AZT (UTC+4)	Hajiyev (yellow card) 24'; Arago (yellow card) 26'; Naghiyev (yellow card) 43'; Azizli (yellow card) 81'	Report	Azadov 16'; Hajiyev 21'; Valizade 90+5'	Stadium: Bayil Arena; Referee: Rauf Jabarov

19 March 2022 20	Sabah	1 – 0	Sabail	Masazır
16:45 AZT (UTC+4)	Ceballos 62' (yellow card) 90+2'	Report	Bayramli (yellow card) 73'	Stadium: Bank Respublika Arena; Referee: Aliyar Ağayev

2 April 2022 21	Qarabağ	5 – 1	Sabail	Baku
16:00 AZT (UTC+4)	L.Andrade 3', 41'; Sheydayev 54', 56'; Medvedev (yellow card) 58'; Mahammadaliyev (yellow card) 61'; Cafarguliyev 86'	Report	Rajsel 62' (pen.); H.Guliyev (yellow card) 82'	Stadium: Azersun Arena; Referee: Raad Ahmadov

10 April 2022 22	Sabail	3 – 0	Gabala	Bayil
20:30 AZT (UTC+4)	Naghiyev 41'; Rajsel 68'; I.Aslanly 73'; Šimkus (yellow card) 87'	Report	Alimi (yellow card) 66'; Ahmadov (yellow card) 67'; Mammadov (yellow card) 68'	Stadium: Bayil Arena; Referee: Vugar Hasanli

16 April 2022 23	Zira	2 – 1	Sabail	Zirə
18:15 AZT (UTC+4)	Keyta 32', 34' (pen.) (yellow card) 72'; Aliyev (yellow card) 50'	Report	E.Tagiyev (yellow card) 21'; Rajsel 90+5' (pen.)	Stadium: Zira Olympic Sport Complex Stadium; Referee: Aliyar Ağayev

24 April 2022 24	Sabail	0 – 1	Neftçi	Bayil
20:00 AZT (UTC+4)	Naghiyev (yellow card) 65'; Bayramli (yellow card) 80'	Report	Buludov (yellow card) 37' (yellow-red card) 47'; Bezerra 71'; K.Ibrahimov (yellow card) 89'; Mbodj (yellow card) 90+1'	Stadium: Bayil Arena; Referee: Ravan Hamzazada

3 May 2022 25	Shamakhi	0 – 0	Sabail	Shamakhi
16:30 AZT (UTC+4)	E.Mustafayev (yellow card) 59'; Qirtimov (yellow card) 80'	Report	Rajsel (yellow card) 59'; H.Guliyev (yellow card) 68'; E.Tagiyev (yellow card) 79'	Stadium: Şamaxı Sahar Stadium; Referee: Ingilab Mammadov
Note: On 6 April, Keşla changed their name to Shamakhi.

8 May 2022 26	Sabail	0 – 2	Sabah	Baku
18:00 AZT (UTC+4)	Arago (yellow card) 2'; Amirli (yellow card) 64'	Report	Letić 15'; Rangel 37'; Mickels (yellow card) 52'	Stadium: Bayil Arena; Referee: Elcin Masiyev

15 May 2022 27	Sabail	0 – 3	Qarabağ	Baku
17:00 AZT (UTC+4)	Rajsel (yellow card) 20'; Šimkus (yellow card) 23'; Naghiyev (yellow card) 38'	Report	Huseynli (yellow card) 58' (goal) 70'; Z.Aliyev (yellow card) 76'; Gurbanlı 87'; Sheydayev 90+1'	Stadium: Bayil Arena; Referee: Vugar Həsənli

21 May 2022 28	Sumgayit	5 – 0	Sabail	Sumgait
19:00 AZT (UTC+4)	Nuriyev 6'; Mustafayev (yellow card) 27'; Ghorbani 35', 43'; Hüseynov (yellow card) 48'; Badalov 51'; Beybalayev 88'	Report	E.Tagiyev (yellow card) 76'; Naghiyev (yellow card) 90+3'	Stadium: Kapital Bank Arena; Referee: Ravan Hamzazada

==== League table ====
Pos	Team	Pld	W	D	L	GF	GA	GD	Pts	Qualification
4	Gabala	28	12	9	7	38	34	+4	45	Qualification to Europa Conference League second qualifying round
5	Sabah	28	12	5	11	42	34	+8	41	
6	Sumgayit	28	5	7	16	22	46	−24	22 (Note: Head-to-head points: Sumgayit 7, Shamakhi 4.)	
7	Shamakhi	28	5	7	16	25	49	−24	22	
8	Sabail	28	4	3	21	17	57	−40	15	

Source: Soccerway
Rules for classification: 1) Points; 2) Head-to-head points; 3) Head-to-head goal difference; 4) Head-to-head goals scored; 5) Head-to-head away goals scored (only if two teams); 6) Goal difference; 7) Goals scored.

=== Azerbaijan Cup ===
10 December 2021 First Round	Zagatala	1 – 3	Sabail	Zaqatala
14:00 AZT (UTC+4)	R.İsmayilov (yellow card) 7' (goal) 57'; R.Şabanov (yellow card) 45'; E.Şirinov (yellow card) 57'; O.Soltanov (yellow card) 66'	Report	Abbasov 48', 90+2'; Ismayilov 67' (pen.)	Stadium: Zaqatala City Stadium; Referee: Tural Gurbanov

2 February 2022 Quarterfinal 1st leg	Zira	4 – 0	Sabail	Zirə
17:00 AZT (UTC+4)	Hamdaoui 45+2'; Brogno 59', 86'; Volkovi (yellow card) 66'; Keyta 72'	Report	Goxha (yellow card) 66'	Stadium: Zira Olympic Sport Complex Stadium; Referee: Kamal Umudlu

13 February 2022 Quarterfinal 2nd leg	Sabail	1 – 3 (1 – 7 agg.)	Zira	Baku
18:00 AZT (UTC+4)	V.Cəfərov (yellow card) 3'; Hajiyev 7'; Rahimli (yellow card) 75'	Report	Alceus (yellow card) 16'; Ramazanov 21'; R.Ahmedov (yellow card) 27'; Khalilzade 39' (pen.); Diniyev 73'	Stadium: Bayil Arena; Referee: Aliyar Agayev

== Squad statistics ==
As of match played 21 May 2022

=== Appearances and goals ===
No.	Pos	Nat	Player	Total		Premier League		Azerbaijan Cup	
No.	Pos	Nat	Player	Apps	Goals	Apps	Goals	Apps	Goals
1	GK	(Azerbaijan) AZE	Rashad Azizli	10	0	9	0	1	0
3	DF	(Azerbaijan) AZE	Turan Manafov	15	1	14	1	1	0
5	DF	(Azerbaijan) AZE	Adil Naghiyev	27	1	23+2	1	2	0
6	DF	(Azerbaijan) AZE	Jabir Amirli	28	1	24+1	1	2+1	0
7	MF	(Azerbaijan) AZE	Mirsahib Abbasov	23	3	15+6	1	0+2	2
10	MF	(Azerbaijan) AZE	Javid Taghiyev	25	0	6+17	0	2	0
11	FW	(Azerbaijan) AZE	Rauf Aliyev	25	2	18+6	2	1	0
12	GK	(Azerbaijan) AZE	Hüseynəli Quliyev	6	0	5+1	0	0	0
14	MF	(Azerbaijan) AZE	Rahid Amirguliyev	24	1	19+2	1	3	0
17	MF	(Azerbaijan) AZE	Elchin Rahimli	12	0	5+5	0	1+1	0
19	MF	(Azerbaijan) AZE	Ruslan Hajiyev	24	1	8+13	0	1+2	1
20	MF	(Azerbaijan) AZE	Orkhan Farajov	1	0	1	0	0	0
21	DF	(Azerbaijan) AZE	Mahammad Mirzabeyov	23	0	15+6	0	1+1	0
22	MF	(Azerbaijan) AZE	Afran Ismayilov	14	1	7+5	0	1+1	1
25	GK	(Azerbaijan) AZE	Elkhan Ahmadov	6	0	4	0	2	0
30	DF	(Liberia) LBR	Jamal Arago	28	1	25	1	3	0
32	FW	(Slovenia) SLO	Nicolas Rajsel	21	5	17+2	5	2	0
33	MF	(Lithuania) LTU	Domantas Šimkus	26	1	23+1	1	2	0
34	DF	(Albania) ALB	Jurgen Goxha	20	2	17	2	2+1	0
38	MF	(Azerbaijan) AZE	Zeynəddin Abdurahmanov	1	0	0+1	0	0	0
39	MF	(Azerbaijan) AZE	Tural Bayramli	9	0	8+1	0	0	0
66	DF	(Azerbaijan) AZE	Ibrahim Aslanli	9	1	8	1	1	0
70	MF	(Azerbaijan) AZE	Elsad Tagiyev	1	0	0+1	0	0	0
77	MF	(Azerbaijan) AZE	Adilkhan Garahmadov	22	0	18+3	0	1	0
88	MF	(Azerbaijan) AZE	Elmir Tagiyev	13	0	8+4	0	1	0
99	FW	(Azerbaijan) AZE	Vidadi Cəfərov	4	0	1+1	0	2	0
Players away on loan:
Players who left Sabail during the season:
1	GK	(Azerbaijan) AZE	Kamran Agayev	9	0	9	0	0	0
2	DF	(Azerbaijan) AZE	Elton Alibeyli	4	0	0+4	0	0	0
8	MF	(Azerbaijan) AZE	Elshan Abdullayev	3	0	0+2	0	1	0
31	GK	(Azerbaijan) AZE	Nail Alishov	1	0	1	0	0	0

=== Goal scorers ===
Place	Position	Nation	Number	Name	Premier League	Azerbaijan Cup	Total
1	FW	(Slovenia)	32	Nicolas Rajsel	5	0	5
2	MF	(Azerbaijan)	7	Mirsahib Abbasov	1	2	3
3	DF	(Albania)	34	Jurgen Goxha	2	0	2
3	FW	(Azerbaijan)	11	Rauf Aliyev	2	0	2
5	DF	(Azerbaijan)	6	Jabir Amirli	1	0	1
5	DF	(Azerbaijan)	3	Turan Manafov	1	0	1
5	MF	(Azerbaijan)	14	Rahid Amirguliyev	1	0	1
5	DF	(Liberia)	30	Jamal Arago	1	0	1
5	MF	(Lithuania)	33	Domantas Šimkus	1	0	1
5	DF	(Azerbaijan)	55	Turan Manafov	1	0	1
5	DF	(Azerbaijan)	66	Ibrahim Aslanli	1	0	1
5	MF	(Azerbaijan)	22	Afran Ismayilov	0	1	1
5	MF	(Azerbaijan)	19	Ruslan Hajiyev	0	1	1
				TOTALS	17	4	21

=== Clean sheets ===
Place	Position	Nation	Number	Name	Premier League	Azerbaijan Cup	Total
1	GK	(Azerbaijan)	1	Rashad Azizli	2	0	2
2	GK	(Azerbaijan)	1	Kamran Agayev	1	0	1
2	GK	(Azerbaijan)	12	Hüseynəli Quliyev	1	0	1
				TOTALS	3	0	3

Azizli & Quliyev both played in Sabail's 0-0 draw against over Shamakhi on 3 May 2022

=== Disciplinary record ===
Number	Nation	Position	Name	Premier League		Azerbaijan Cup		Total	
Number	Nation	Position	Name	Yellow card	Red card	Yellow card	Red card	Yellow card	Red card
1	(Azerbaijan)	GK	Rashad Azizli	1	0	0	0	1	0
3	(Azerbaijan)	DF	Turan Manafov	2	0	0	0	2	0
5	(Azerbaijan)	DF	Adil Naghiyev	10	0	0	0	10	0
6	(Azerbaijan)	DF	Jabir Amirli	3	0	0	0	3	0
7	(Azerbaijan)	MF	Mirsahib Abbasov	2	0	0	0	2	0
10	(Azerbaijan)	MF	Javid Taghiyev	1	0	0	0	1	0
11	(Azerbaijan)	FW	Rauf Aliyev	3	0	0	0	3	0
12	(Azerbaijan)	GK	Hüseynəli Quliyev	2	0	0	0	2	0
14	(Azerbaijan)	MF	Rahid Amirguliyev	2	0	0	0	2	0
17	(Azerbaijan)	MF	Elchin Rahimli	2	0	1	0	3	0
19	(Azerbaijan)	MF	Ruslan Hajiyev	2	0	0	0	2	0
20	(Azerbaijan)	MF	Orkhan Farajov	1	0	0	0	1	0
21	(Azerbaijan)	DF	Mahammad Mirzabeyov	3	0	0	0	3	0
30	(Liberia)	DF	Jamal Arago	6	0	0	0	6	0
32	(Slovenia)	FW	Nicolas Rajsel	2	1	0	0	2	1
33	(Lithuania)	MF	Domantas Šimkus	4	0	0	0	4	0
34	(Albania)	DF	Jurgen Goxha	9	1	1	0	10	1
39	(Azerbaijan)	MF	Tural Bayramli	4	0	0	0	4	0
77	(Azerbaijan)	MF	Adilkhan Garahmadov	2	1	0	0	2	1
88	(Azerbaijan)	MF	Elmir Tagiyev	4	0	0	0	4	0
99	(Azerbaijan)	FW	Vidadi Cəfərov	1	0	1	0	2	0
Players who left Sabail during the season:
31	(Azerbaijan)	GK	Nail Alishov	1	0	0	0	1	0
			TOTALS	67	3	3	0	70	3
