= 2020–21 Gabala FK season =

Gabala
2020-21 season
- Chairman: Fariz Najafov
- Manager: Elmar Bakhshiyev
- Stadium: Gabala City Stadium
- Premier League: 7th
- Azerbaijan Cup: Quarterfinal vs Qarabağ
- Top goalscorer: League: Raphael Utzig (5); All: James Adeniyi (6)
Home colours	Away colours

The 2020–21 season was Gabala FK's 16th season, and their 15th in the Azerbaijan Premier League, the top-flight of Azerbaijani football.

== Season events ==
On 10 August, Gabala announced the signing of Jurgen Goxha to a one-year contract, with the option of an additional year.

On 14 August, Gabala announced the signing of Stefan Vukčević to a one-year contract, with the option of an additional year.

On 8 September, Gabala announced the signing of Vinko Međimorec to a one-year contract, with the option of an additional year.

On 11 September, Gabala announced the signing of Raphael Utzig to a one-year contract, with the option of an additional year.

On 5 October, Qismət Alıyev was sold to Zira

On 27 November, Gabala's match against Sumgayit scheduled for 28 November was postponed due to players testing positive for COVID-19, and Spanish club UD Montijo announced the signing of Rodrigo Gattas from Gabala.

== Squad ==
As of match played 19 May 2021

No.	Name	Nationality	Position	Date of birth (age)	Signed from	Signed in	Contract ends	Apps.	Goals
Goalkeepers
1	Anar Nazirov	(Azerbaijan)	GK	8 September 1985 (aged 35)	Zira	2019		78	0
36	Mushvig Nadirov	(Azerbaijan)	GK	24 May 2002 (aged 18)	Trainee	2020		0	0
94	Tarlan Ahmadli	(Azerbaijan)	GK	21 November 1994 (aged 26)	Sabah	2019		16	0
Defenders
2	Vinko Međimorec	(Croatia)	DF	1 June 1996 (aged 24)	Slaven Belupo	2020	2021 (+1)	26	1
4	Sadig Guliyev	(Azerbaijan)	DF	9 March 1995 (aged 26)	Zira	2019		30	0
5	Rasim Ramaldanov	(Azerbaijan)	DF	24 January 1986 (aged 35)	Kolkheti-1913 Poti	2017		39	1
13	Jurgen Goxha	(Albania)	DF	29 December 1992 (aged 28)	Tirana	2020		26	2
20	Faig Hajiyev	(Azerbaijan)	DF	22 May 1999 (aged 21)	Trainee	2017		6	0
28	Murad Musayev	(Azerbaijan)	DF	13 June 1994 (aged 26)	Zira	2019		40	0
71	Rufat Ahmadov	(Azerbaijan)	DF	22 September 2002 (aged 18)	Trainee	2020		19	0
74	Yusif Nabiyev	(Azerbaijan)	DF	3 September 1997 (aged 23)	Trainee	2015		36	2
Midfielders
6	Kamal Mirzayev	(Azerbaijan)	MF	14 September 1994 (aged 26)	Al-Salmiya	2020		9	0
7	Roman Huseynov	(Azerbaijan)	MF	26 December 1997 (aged 23)	Trainee	2015		46	2
9	Ehtiram Shahverdiyev	(Azerbaijan)	MF	1 October 1996 (aged 24)	Sumgayit	2020	2021	26	0
10	Rovlan Muradov	(Azerbaijan)	MF	28 March 1998 (aged 23)	Trainee	2017		46	5
11	Asif Mammadov	(Azerbaijan)	MF	5 August 1986 (aged 34)	Inter Baku	2015		171+	14
14	Javid Huseynov	(Azerbaijan)	MF	9 March 1988 (aged 33)	Zira	2020		140	21
17	Yaovi Akakpo	(Togo)	MF	11 March 1999 (aged 22)		2019	2022	2	0
26	Stefan Vukčević	(Montenegro)	MF	11 April 1997 (aged 24)	Zeta	2020	2021	28	2
55	Idris Ingilabli	(Azerbaijan)	MF	6 October 2001 (aged 19)	loan from Sabah	2020	2021	20	0
77	Merab Gigauri	(Georgia (country))	MF	5 January 1993 (aged 27)	Torpedo Kutaisi	2019		47	1
	Samir Maharramli	(Azerbaijan)	MF	17 July 2002 (aged 18)	loan from Sabah	2020	2021	0	0
Forwards
23	Raphael Utzig	(Brazil)	FW	8 August 1996 (aged 24)	Paraná	2020	2021 (+1)	28	5
32	Nicolas Rajsel	(Slovenia)	FW	31 May 1993 (aged 27)	KV Oostende	2020	2021	33	7
70	Ulvi Isgandarov	(Azerbaijan)	FW	17 April 1998 (aged 23)	Trainee	2017		41	6
99	James Adeniyi	(Nigeria)	FW	20 December 1992 (aged 28)	Skënderbeu Korçë	2018	2021	57	18
Out on loan
Left during the season
8	Qismət Alıyev	(Azerbaijan)	MF	24 October 1996 (aged 24)	Trainee	2014		86	1
19	Samir Gurbanov	(Azerbaijan)	MF	21 March 2001 (aged 20)	Trainee	2018		1	0
22	Rodrigo Gattas	(Chile)	FW	2 December 1991 (aged 29)	York9	2020	2021	4	0

== Transfers ==
=== In ===
Date	Position	Nationality	Name	From	Fee	Ref.
Summer 2020	MF	(Azerbaijan)	Kamal Mirzayev	Al-Salmiya	Free	
24 July 2020	MF	(Azerbaijan)	Javid Huseynov	Zira	Undisclosed	
10 August 2020	DF	(Albania)	Jurgen Goxha	Tirana	Undisclosed	
14 August 2020	MF	(Montenegro)	Stefan Vukčević	Zeta	Undisclosed	
8 September 2020	DF	(Croatia)	Vinko Međimorec	Slaven Belupo	Undisclosed	
11 September 2020	FW	(Brazil)	Raphael Utzig	Paraná	Undisclosed	

=== Loans in ===
Date from	Position	Nationality	Name	From	Date to	Ref.
Summer 2020	MF	(Azerbaijan)	Idris Ingilabli	Sabah	End of season	
Summer 2020	MF	(Azerbaijan)	Samir Maharramli	Sabah	End of season	

=== Out ===
Date	Position	Nationality	Name	To	Fee	Ref.
5 October 2020	MF	(Azerbaijan)	Qismət Alıyev	Zira	Undisclosed	
27 November 2020	FW	(Chile)	Rodrigo Gattas	UD Montijo	Undisclosed	

=== Released ===
Date	Position	Nationality	Name	Joined	Date	Ref.
31 December 2020	FW	(Azerbaijan)	Samir Gurbanov	Kapaz		
11 June 2021	DF	(Azerbaijan)	Sadig Guliyev			
11 June 2021	DF	(Azerbaijan)	Faig Hajiyev	Turan-Tovuz		
11 June 2021	DF	(Azerbaijan)	Yusif Nabiyev	Sumgayit		
11 June 2021	MF	(Georgia (country))	Merab Gigauri	Keşla		
11 June 2021	MF	(Azerbaijan)	Javid Huseynov			
11 June 2021	MF	(Azerbaijan)	Roman Huseynov	Sumgayit		
11 June 2021	FW	(Azerbaijan)	Ulvi Isgandarov	Gabala		
11 June 2021	FW	(Nigeria)	James Adeniyi	Maccabi Petah Tikva		
11 June 2021	FW	(Slovenia)	Nicolas Rajsel	Sabail	6 September 2021	
22 June 2021	DF	(Croatia)	Vinko Međimorec	UTA Arad	22 June 2021	

== Friendlies ==
10 August 2020	Sabah	2 – 0	Gabala	Baku
AZT (UTC+4)	A.Agazade; Mirzabeyov	Report		Stadium: Bank Respublika Arena

14 August 2020	Neftçi	2 – 1	Gabala	Baku
AZT (UTC+4)	Kane; Lawal	Report	Rajsel	Stadium: Bakcell Arena

30 August 2020	Gabala	1 – 0	Sabail	Baku
AZT (UTC+4)	Rajsel 75' (pen.)	Report		Stadium: Baku Olympic Stadium

5 September 2020	Zira	3 – 1	Gabala	Baku
AZT (UTC+4)	Rahimov 28'; Ramazanov 75'; Caio Rangel 75'	Report	R.Huseynov 38'	Stadium: Baku Olympic Stadium

14 January 2021	Sumgayit	1 – 1	Gabala	Sumgait
AZT (UTC+4)	Khachayev 24'	Report	Rajsel 42'	Stadium: Kapital Bank Arena

== Competitions ==
=== Premier League ===
==== Results summary ====
Overall								Home						Away					
Pld	W	D	L	GF	GA	GD	Pts	W	D	L	GF	GA	GD	W	D	L	GF	GA	GD
28	5	11	12	23	43	−20	26	3	9	2	16	19	−3	2	2	10	7	24	−17

Last updated: 19 May 2021.
Source: See Results

==== Results by round ====
Round	1	2	3	4	5	6	7	8	9	10	11	12	13	14	15	16	17	18	19	20	21	22	23	24	25	26	27	28
Ground	H	A	H	A	A	A	H	H	A	H	A	H	A	A	H	A	H	A	H	H	A	H	A	H	A	A	H	A
Result	D	L	D	D	D	L	D	W	L	L	W	D	W	L	W	L	W	L	D	D	L	D	L	L	L	D	D	L
Position	5	7	7	8	8	8	8	7	7	8	6	7	5	5	5	5	5	5	5	5	5	5	5	5	6	6	6	7

Updated to match(es) played on 19 May 2021. Source: See Results
A = Away; H = Home; W = Win; D = Draw; L = Loss

==== Results ====
23 August 2020 1	Gabala	1 – 1	Zira	Qabala
19:00 AZT (UTC+4)	Mammadov 3' (yellow card) 11'; Goxha (yellow card) 13'; Gattas (yellow card) 84'	Report	H.Hajili (yellow card) 14' (yellow-red card) 90+1'; Đorđević (yellow card) 18'; Ramazanov 28'; Rahimov (yellow card) 45+1'	Stadium: Gabala City Stadium; Attendance: 0 Referee: Kamal Umudlu
Note: Match played behind closed doors due to the COVID-19 pandemic.

13 September 2020 2	Sabah	3 – 0	Gabala	Masazır
19:00 AZT (UTC+4)	Diniyev 17'; Mustafazade 28'; Marina (yellow card) 38'; S.Alkhasov (yellow card) 49' (yellow-red card) 77'; Sheydayev 64'	Report	Mammadov (yellow card) 4'; R.Muradov (yellow card) 45+2'; Q.Alıyev (yellow card) 62'; Međimorec (yellow card) 70'; Goxha (yellow card) 85'	Stadium: Bank Respublika Arena; Attendance: 0 Referee: Aliyar Aghayev
Note: Match played behind closed doors due to the COVID-19 pandemic.

19 September 2020 3	Gabala	0 – 0	Keşla	Qabala
17:00 AZT (UTC+4)	Rajsel (yellow card) 21' (yellow-red card) 67'; Utzig (yellow card) 32'; R.Muradov (yellow card) 90+1'	Report	Bojović (yellow card) 69'; Sílvio (yellow card) 79'; Isgandarli (yellow card) 89'; Alvaro (yellow card) 89'	Stadium: Gabala City Stadium; Attendance: 0 Referee: Raad Ahmadov
Note: Match played behind closed doors due to the COVID-19 pandemic.

27 September 2020 4	Neftçi	1 – 1	Gabala	Baku
19:00 AZT (UTC+4)	Mahmudov (yellow card) 56'; Buludov (yellow card) 62'; Abbasov (yellow card) 90'; Bougrine 90+4'	Report	Gigauri (yellow card) 4'; R.Muradov 32' (yellow card) 77'; Utzig (yellow card) 45'	Stadium: Dalga Arena; Attendance: 0 Referee: Rahim Hasanov
Note: Match played at the Dalga Arena in Baku, instead of Neftçi's Eighth Kilometer District Stadium in Baku. Match played behind closed doors due to the COVID-19 pandemic.

3 October 2020 5	Gabala	1 – 1	Sumgayit	Qabala
14:00 AZT (UTC+4)	Utzig 44'; Gigauri (yellow card) 49'; R.Muradov (yellow card) 68'; Adeniyi (yellow card) 76'; Huseynov (yellow card) 81'; Vukčević (yellow card) 85'	Report	Ghorbani 26'; Mustafayev (yellow card) 71'	Stadium: Gabala City Stadium; Attendance: 0 Referee: Aliyar Aghayev
Note: Match played behind closed doors due to the COVID-19 pandemic.

17 October 2020 6	Qarabağ	3 – 0	Gabala	Baku
16:00 AZT (UTC+4)	Medina (yellow card) 21'; Guerrier 43'; Andrade 89' (pen.); T.Bayramov 90+1'	Report	Adeniyi (yellow card) 21'; Ingilabli (yellow card) 70'; Gigauri (yellow card) 87'	Stadium: Azersun Arena; Attendance: 0 Referee: Raad Ahmadov
Note: Match played behind closed doors due to the COVID-19 pandemic.

24 October 2020 7	Gabala	1 – 1	Sabail	Qabala
14:00 AZT (UTC+4)	Goxha 4'; Gigauri (yellow card) 85'	Report	Ekstein 26'; P.Keshavarzi (yellow card) 70'; Rahimli (yellow card) 86'	Stadium: Gabala City Stadium; Attendance: 0 Referee: Ingilab Mammadov
Note: Match played behind closed doors due to the COVID-19 pandemic.

31 October 2020 8	Gabala	2 – 1	Sabah	Qabala
14:00 AZT (UTC+4)	Mammadov (yellow card) 19'; Nabiyev 31'; Rajsel 53'; Ahmadli (yellow card) 89'	Report	Vujadinović (yellow card) 35' (yellow-red card) 68'; Ivanović (yellow card) 36'; Seydiyev (yellow card) 42'; Sheydayev 81' (yellow card) 82'	Stadium: Gabala City Stadium; Attendance: 0 Referee: Vugar Hasanli
Note: Match played behind closed doors due to the COVID-19 pandemic.

7 November 2020 9	Keşla	3 – 1	Gabala	Baku
14:00 AZT (UTC+4)	Meza 41'; Mammadov 75' (o.g.); Sílvio 90'; Amirjanov (yellow card) 90+1'	Report	Rajsel 32'; Nabiyev (yellow card) 57'	Stadium: ASK Arena; Attendance: 0 Referee: Elcin Masiyev
Note: Match played behind closed doors due to the COVID-19 pandemic.

22 November 2020 10	Gabala	1 – 4	Neftçi	Qabala
14:00 AZT (UTC+4)	Nabiyev 60'; Musayev (yellow card) 60'	Report	Krivotsyuk (yellow card) 13' (goal) 38', 51'; Lawal (yellow card) 28'; Alaskarov 57'; Ibara 90+4'	Stadium: Gabala City Stadium; Attendance: 0 Referee: Ravan Hamzazada
Note: Match played behind closed doors due to the COVID-19 pandemic.

30 November 2020 11	Sumgayit	0 – 1	Gabala	Sumqayit
14:00 AZT (UTC+4)	Turabov (yellow card) 30'; Hüseynov (yellow card) 58'; N.Mammadov (yellow card) 80'; Khachayev (yellow card) 86'	Report	Utzig 16'; Ahmadov (yellow card) 53'; Huseynov (yellow card) 61'; R.Muradov (yellow card) 64'; Nazirov (yellow card) 90+2'	Stadium: Kapital Bank Arena; Attendance: 0 Referee: Rahim Hasanov
Note: Match originally scheduled for 28 November, but postponed on 27 November 2020. Match played behind closed doors due to the COVID-19 pandemic.

20 December 2020 12	Gabala	1 – 1	Qarabağ	Qabala
15:00 AZT (UTC+4)	R.Muradov (yellow card) 68' (yellow-red card) 69'; Utzig 83'; Nazirov (yellow card) 90+3'	Report	Emreli (yellow card) 8'; Kwabena (yellow card) 45+2'; Ozobić 51'; Jafarguliyev (yellow card) 90+3'	Stadium: Gabala City Stadium; Attendance: 0 Referee: Rauf Jabbarov
Note: Match originally scheduled for 6 December, but postponed. Match played behind closed doors due to the COVID-19 pandemic.

24 December 2020 13	Sabail	1 – 3	Gabala	Baku
16:00 AZT (UTC+4)	U.Abbasov (yellow card) 4'; R.Aliyev (yellow card) 36'; Manafov 52'	Report	Musayev (yellow card) 16'; Isgandarov 20'; Mammadov 28' (yellow card) 56'; Adeniyi 90+3'	Stadium: Bayil Arena; Attendance: 0 Referee: Aliyar Aghayev
Note: Match played behind closed doors due to the COVID-19 pandemic.

21 January 2021 14	Zira	2 – 0	Gabala	Zirə
16:00 AZT (UTC+4)	Volkovi (yellow card) 21' (goal) 90+4'; Q.Alıyev (yellow card) 38'; Gurbanli 45+1'; Jamalov (yellow card) 60'; Richard (yellow card) 69'	Report	Utzig (yellow card) 17'; J.Huseynov (yellow card) 73'; Međimorec (yellow card) 85'; Gigauri (yellow card) 90+4'	Stadium: Zira Olympic Sport Complex Stadium; Attendance: 0 Referee: Orkhan Mammadov
Note: Match played behind closed doors due to the COVID-19 pandemic.

14 February 2021 15	Gabala	2 – 0	Keşla	Qabala
15:00 AZT (UTC+4)	Mammadov (yellow card) 19'; Musayev (yellow card) 45+1'; Rajsel (yellow card) 45+1'; Gigauri 50'; Vukčević (yellow card) 65'; Utzig 70'	Report	Tounkara (yellow card) 26'; Cociuc (yellow card) 50'; Bojović (yellow card) 61'	Stadium: Gabala City Stadium; Attendance: 0 Referee: Rauf Jabbarov
Note: Match played behind closed doors due to the COVID-19 pandemic.

20 February 2021 16	Neftçi	1 – 0	Gabala	Baku
18:00 AZT (UTC+4)	Alaskarov (yellow card) 33'; Mahmudov 90+4'	Report	Goxha (yellow card) 26'; Ahmadov (yellow card) 27'; Adeniyi (yellow card) 45+2'; R.Muradov (yellow card) 82'	Stadium: Eighth Kilometer District Stadium; Attendance: 0 Referee: Ingilab Mammadov
Note: Match played behind closed doors due to the COVID-19 pandemic.

25 February 2021 17	Gabala	1 – 0	Sumgayit	Qabala
15:00 AZT (UTC+4)	Vukčević (yellow card) 29'; Adeniyi 51'; Gigauri (yellow card) 60'; Shahverdiyev (yellow card) 65'; Nazirov (yellow card) 89'; J.Huseynov (yellow card) 90'; Utzig (yellow card) 90+2'	Report	Najafov (yellow card) 9'; Khodzhaniyazov (yellow card) 60'; Abdullazade (yellow card) 79'	Stadium: Gabala City Stadium; Attendance: 0 Referee: Sabuhi Bayramov
Note: Match played behind closed doors due to the COVID-19 pandemic.

2 March 2021 18	Qarabağ	3 – 0	Gabala	Baku
18:15 AZT (UTC+4)	Ozobić 22', 34' (pen.); Emreli 38'	Report	Nabiyev (yellow card) 14'; Nazirov (yellow card) 33'; Gigauri (yellow card) 90+1'	Stadium: Azersun Arena; Attendance: 0 Referee: Kamal Umudlu
Note: Match played behind closed doors due to the COVID-19 pandemic.

9 March 2021 19	Gabala	1 – 1	Sabail	Qabala
15:00 AZT (UTC+4)	Ahmadov (yellow card) 43' (yellow-red card) 88'; Utzig 78'	Report	Yunanov (yellow card) 37' (goal) 57'; Ismayilov (yellow card) 58'; Hajiyev (red card) 67'	Stadium: Gabala City Stadium; Attendance: 0 Referee: Raad Ahmadov
Note: Match played behind closed doors due to the COVID-19 pandemic.

14 March 2021 20	Gabala	1 – 1	Zira	Qabala
15:00 AZT (UTC+4)	Međimorec 23'; Gigauri (red card) 29'; Goxha (yellow card) 67'; Rajsel (yellow card) 87'; J.Huseynov (yellow card) 87'	Report	Ramazanov (yellow card) 60'; Richard (yellow card) 72'; Chantakias (yellow card) 90+1'; Melivilo 90+3'; Muradov (yellow card) 90+4'	Stadium: Gabala City Stadium; Attendance: 0 Referee: Vugar Hasanli
Note: Match played behind closed doors due to the COVID-19 pandemic.

4 April 2021 21	Sabah	1 – 0	Gabala	Masazır
17:30 AZT (UTC+4)	Marina (yellow card) 30'; Isayev (yellow card) 35'; Sheydayev 45+1'; Ivanović (yellow card) 67'; Mustafazade (yellow card) 84'	Report	Ahmadov (yellow card) 27'; Musayev (yellow card) 90+1'; Shahverdiyev (yellow card) 90+1'; Nazirov (yellow card) 90+2'; Mammadov (yellow card) 90+4'	Stadium: Bank Respublika Arena; Attendance: 0 Referee: Rahim Hasanov
Note: Match played behind closed doors due to the COVID-19 pandemic.

10 April 2021 22	Gabala	2 – 2	Neftçi	Qabala
16:00 AZT (UTC+4)	Utzig (yellow card) 35'; Shahverdiyev (yellow card) 44'; Adeniyi 54' (yellow card) 62'; Goxha 67' (yellow card) 70'; Mirzayev (yellow card) 65'; Nazirov (yellow card) 90+1'	Report	Mahmudov (yellow card) 28' (goal) 71' (pen.); Çelik (yellow card) 37'; Abbasov 62'	Stadium: Gabala City Stadium; Attendance: 0 Referee: Aliyar Aghayev
Note: Match played behind closed doors due to the COVID-19 pandemic.

16 April 2021 23	Sumgayit	2 – 0	Gabala	Sumqayit
20:15 AZT (UTC+4)	Mutallimov (yellow card) 45+3'; Hüseynov (yellow card) 49'; Ghorbani (yellow card) 59' (goal) 75'; Sadikhov 66'	Report	Mirzayev (yellow card) 46'; Muradov (yellow card) 54'; Musayev (yellow card) 63'	Stadium: Kapital Bank Arena; Attendance: 0 Referee: Vugar Hasanli
Note: Match played behind closed doors due to the COVID-19 pandemic.

25 April 2021 24	Gabala	0 – 5	Qarabağ	Qabala
17:00 AZT (UTC+4)	Ahmadov (yellow card) 52'	Report	Ibrahimli (yellow card) 33'; Romero 64'; Garayev 68'; Emreli 88', 89', 90'	Stadium: Gabala City Stadium; Attendance: 0 Referee: Elcin Masiyev
Note: Match played behind closed doors due to the COVID-19 pandemic.

3 May 2021 25	Sabail	1 – 0	Gabala	Baku
20:15 AZT (UTC+4)	Ekstein (yellow card) 38'; Yunanov 61'; Abbasov (yellow card) 84'; Rahimli (yellow card) 88'	Report	Gigauri (yellow card) 20' (yellow-red card) 51'; Goxha (yellow card) 86'	Stadium: Bayil Arena; Attendance: 0 Referee: Ingilab Mammadov
Note: Match played behind closed doors due to the COVID-19 pandemic.

9 May 2021 26	Zira	0 – 0	Gabala	Zirə
18:00 AZT (UTC+4)	Volkovi (yellow card) 20'; Hajili (yellow card) 67'	Report	Mammadov (yellow card) 70'	Stadium: Zira Olympic Sport Complex Stadium; Attendance: 0 Referee: Aliyar Aghayev
Note: Match played behind closed doors due to the COVID-19 pandemic.

14 May 2021 27	Gabala	2 – 2	Sabah	Qabala
17:00 AZT (UTC+4)	Goxha (yellow card) 41'; Rajsel 63' (pen.); Vukčević 65'	Report	Rodríguez 29'; Marina (yellow card) 44'; Alkhasov 59'; Sheydayev (yellow card) 90+4'; Diniyev (yellow card) 90+4'	Stadium: Gabala City Stadium; Attendance: 0 Referee: Elcin Masiyev
Note: Match played behind closed doors due to the COVID-19 pandemic.

19 May 2021 28	Keşla	3 – 1	Gabala	Baku
18:00 AZT (UTC+4)	S.Aliyev 15' (yellow card) 40'; Sílvio 16'; Isgandarli (yellow card) 28' (goal) 90+1'; Tounkara (yellow card) 35'; Meza (red card) 75'; Qirtimov (yellow card) 90+6'	Report	Adeniyi 26'; Vukčević (yellow card) 30'; Musayev (yellow card) 69'	Stadium: ASK Arena; Attendance: 0 Referee: Ravan Hamzazada
Note: Match played behind closed doors due to the COVID-19 pandemic.

==== League table ====
Pos	Team	Pld	W	D	L	GF	GA	GD	Pts	Qualification
4	Zira	28	8	14	6	28	28	0	38	
5	Sabah	28	7	8	13	28	38	−10	29	
6	Keşla	28	5	11	12	25	40	−15	26	Qualification to Europa Conference League second qualifying round
7	Gabala	28	5	11	12	23	44	−21	26	
8	Sabail	28	5	9	14	21	42	−21	24	

Source: Soccerway
Rules for classification: 1) Points; 2) Head-to-head points; 3) Head-to-head goal difference; 4) Head-to-head goals scored; 5) Head-to-head away goals scored (only if two teams); 6) Goal difference; 7) Goals scored.

=== Azerbaijan Cup ===
25 January 2021 Last 16	Turan-Tovuz	0 – 2	Gabala	Tovuz
14:00 AZT (UTC+4)	N.Sabanov (yellow card) 41'; E.Taghiyev (yellow card) 45+3'; V.Jafarov (yellow card) 75'	Report	Vukčević 32'; Adeniyi 45+2'	Stadium: Tovuz City Stadium; Attendance: 0 Referee: Rauf Allahverdiyev
Note: Match played behind closed doors due to the COVID-19 pandemic in Azerbaijan.

1 February 2021 Quarterfinal 1st leg	Qarabağ	3 – 1	Gabala	Baku
18:00 AZT (UTC+4)	Matić (penalty missed) 33'; Kwabena 55'; Emreli 72', 75'; Bayramov (yellow card) 78'	Report	Vukčević (yellow card) 31'; Goxha (yellow card) 33'; Adeniyi 88'	Stadium: Tofiq Bahramov Republican Stadium; Attendance: 0 Referee: Ravan Hamzazada
Note: Match played behind closed doors due to the COVID-19 pandemic in Azerbaijan.

6 February 2021 Quarterfinal 2nd leg	Gabala	0 – 3 (1 – 6 agg.)	Qarabağ	Qabala
15:00 AZT (UTC+4)	Gigauri (yellow card) 68'; Mammadov (yellow card) 85'	Report	Medvedev 6'; B.Huseynov (yellow card) 30'; A.Huseynov (yellow card) 32'; Andrade 45+4' (pen.), 48'	Stadium: Gabala City Stadium; Attendance: 0 Referee: Aliyar Aghayev
Note: Match played behind closed doors due to the COVID-19 pandemic in Azerbaijan.

== Squad statistics ==
As of Match played 19 May 2021

=== Appearances and goals ===
No.	Pos	Nat	Player	Total		Premier League		Azerbaijan Cup	
No.	Pos	Nat	Player	Apps	Goals	Apps	Goals	Apps	Goals
1	GK	(Azerbaijan) AZE	Anar Nazirov	24	0	22	0	2	0
2	DF	(Croatia) CRO	Vinko Međimorec	26	1	23	1	3	0
4	DF	(Azerbaijan) AZE	Sadig Guliyev	2	0	0+1	0	0+1	0
6	MF	(Azerbaijan) AZE	Kamal Mirzayev	4	0	2+2	0	0	0
7	MF	(Azerbaijan) AZE	Roman Huseynov	7	0	0+6	0	0+1	0
9	MF	(Azerbaijan) AZE	Ehtiram Shahverdiyev	19	0	11+5	0	3	0
10	MF	(Azerbaijan) AZE	Rovlan Muradov	23	1	15+6	1	2	0
11	MF	(Azerbaijan) AZE	Asif Mammadov	28	2	23+2	2	3	0
13	DF	(Albania) ALB	Jurgen Goxha	26	2	23+1	2	1+1	0
14	MF	(Azerbaijan) AZE	Javid Huseynov	21	0	7+13	0	0+1	0
17	MF	(Togo) TOG	Yaovi Akakpo	1	0	0+1	0	0	0
20	DF	(Azerbaijan) AZE	Faig Hajiyev	2	0	2	0	0	0
23	FW	(Brazil) BRA	Raphael Utzig	28	5	25	5	3	0
26	MF	(Montenegro) MNE	Stefan Vukčević	28	2	21+4	1	3	1
28	DF	(Azerbaijan) AZE	Murad Musayev	20	0	16+2	0	2	0
32	FW	(Slovenia) SLO	Nicolas Rajsel	29	3	26	3	2+1	0
55	MF	(Azerbaijan) AZE	Idris Ingilabli	16	0	13+2	0	0+1	0
70	FW	(Azerbaijan) AZE	Ulvi Isgandarov	19	1	5+13	1	0+1	0
71	DF	(Azerbaijan) AZE	Rufat Ahmadov	19	0	17	0	2	0
74	DF	(Azerbaijan) AZE	Yusif Nabiyev	15	2	6+8	2	1	0
77	MF	(Georgia (country)) GEO	Merab Gigauri	25	1	21+1	1	3	0
94	GK	(Azerbaijan) AZE	Tarlan Ahmadli	9	0	6+1	0	1+1	0
99	FW	(Nigeria) NGR	James Adeniyi	26	6	17+6	4	2+1	2
Players away from Gabala on loan:
Players who left Gabala during the season:
8	MF	(Azerbaijan) AZE	Qismət Alıyev	5	0	5	0	0	0
22	FW	(Chile) CHI	Rodrigo Gattas	2	0	2	0	0	0

=== Goal scorers ===
Place	Position	Nation	Number	Name	Premier League	Azerbaijan Cup	Total
1	FW	(Nigeria)	99	James Adeniyi	4	2	6
2	FW	(Brazil)	23	Raphael Utzig	5	0	5
3	FW	(Slovenia)	32	Nicolas Rajsel	3	0	3
4	DF	(Azerbaijan)	74	Yusif Nabiyev	2	0	2
4	MF	(Azerbaijan)	11	Asif Mammadov	2	0	2
4	DF	(Albania)	13	Jurgen Goxha	2	0	2
4	MF	(Montenegro)	26	Stefan Vukčević	1	1	2
8	MF	(Azerbaijan)	10	Rovlan Muradov	1	0	1
8	FW	(Azerbaijan)	70	Ulvi Isgandarov	1	0	1
8	MF	(Georgia (country))	77	Merab Gigauri	1	0	1
8	DF	(Croatia)	2	Vinko Međimorec	1	0	1
				TOTALS	23	3	26

=== Clean sheets ===
Place	Position	Nation	Number	Name	Premier League	Azerbaijan Cup	Total
1	GK	(Azerbaijan)	1	Anar Nazirov	4	0	4
2	GK	(Azerbaijan)	94	Tarlan Ahmadli	1	1	2
				TOTALS	5	1	6

=== Disciplinary record ===
Number	Nation	Position	Name	Premier League		Azerbaijan Cup		Total	
Number	Nation	Position	Name	Yellow card	Red card	Yellow card	Red card	Yellow card	Red card
1	(Azerbaijan)	GK	Anar Nazirov	6	0	0	0	6	0
2	(Croatia)	DF	Vinko Međimorec	2	0	0	0	2	0
6	(Azerbaijan)	MF	Kamal Mirzayev	2	0	0	0	2	0
9	(Azerbaijan)	MF	Ehtiram Shahverdiyev	3	0	0	0	3	0
10	(Azerbaijan)	MF	Rovlan Muradov	9	1	0	0	9	1
11	(Azerbaijan)	MF	Asif Mammadov	7	0	1	0	8	0
13	(Albania)	DF	Jurgen Goxha	7	1	1	0	8	1
14	(Azerbaijan)	MF	Javid Huseynov	5	0	0	0	5	0
23	(Brazil)	FW	Raphael Utzig	5	0	0	0	5	0
26	(Montenegro)	MF	Stefan Vukčević	4	0	1	0	5	0
28	(Azerbaijan)	DF	Murad Musayev	6	0	0	0	6	0
32	(Slovenia)	FW	Nicolas Rajsel	4	1	0	0	4	1
55	(Azerbaijan)	MF	Idris Ingilabli	1	0	0	0	1	0
71	(Azerbaijan)	DF	Rufat Ahmadov	6	1	0	0	6	1
74	(Azerbaijan)	DF	Yusif Nabiyev	2	0	0	0	2	0
77	(Georgia (country))	MF	Merab Gigauri	9	2	1	0	10	2
94	(Azerbaijan)	GK	Tarlan Ahmadli	1	0	0	0	1	0
99	(Nigeria)	FW	James Adeniyi	4	0	0	0	4	0
Players who left Gabala during the season:
8	(Azerbaijan)	MF	Qismət Alıyev	1	0	0	0	1	0
22	(Chile)	FW	Rodrigo Gattas	1	0	0	0	1	0
			TOTALS	85	5	4	0	89	5
