= Ibrahim Aslanli =

Azerbaijani footballer (born 1996)

Personal information
- Full name: Ibrahim Adil oglu Aslanli
- Date of birth: 1 December 1996 (age 29)
- Place of birth: Azerbaijan
- Height: 1.78 m (5 ft 10 in)
- Position: Defender

Team information
- Current team: Shamakhi
- Number: 27

Youth career
- Gabala

Senior career*
| Years | Team | Apps | (Gls) |
| 2016–2017 | Qarabağ | 1 | (1) |
| 2018–2021 | Zira | 6 | (0) |
| 2021–2022 | Sabail | 8 | (1) |
| 2022– | Shamakhi | 15 | (0) |
- * Club domestic league appearances and goals as of 4 May 2023

Ibrahim Aslanli (Azerbaijani: İbrahim Aslanlı; born 1 December 1996) is an Azerbaijani footballer who plays as a defender for Shamakhi FK in the Azerbaijan Premier League.

== Club career ==
On 5 November 2017, Aslanli made his debut in the Azerbaijan Premier League for Qarabağ match against Kapaz.
