= Vinko Međimorec =

Croatian footballer (born 1996)

Personal information
- Date of birth: 1 June 1996 (age 30)
- Place of birth: Koprivnica, Croatia
- Height: 1.89 m (6 ft 2 in)
- Position: Defender

Team information
- Current team: Slaven Belupo
- Number: 2

Youth career
- 2007: Slaven Belupo
- 2007–2008: NK Koprivnica
- 2008–2009: Slaven Belupo
- 2009–2010: NK Koprivnica
- 2010–2014: Slaven Belupo

Senior career*
Years	Team	Apps	(Gls)
2014–2015	NK Koprivnica	28	(1)
2015–2020	Slaven Belupo	90	(4)
2020–2021	Qabala	23	(1)
2021–2022	UT Arad	23	(0)
2022–2023	Karmiotissa	13	(1)
2023	Akritas Chlorakas	18	(0)
2023–	Slaven Belupo	31	(2)
2024	→ Aalesund (loan)	14	(1)
- * Club domestic league appearances and goals as of 15 June 2026

Vinko Međimorec (born 1 June 1996) is a Croatian footballer who plays as a defender for Slaven Belupo.

== Club career ==
On 8 September 2020, Međimorec signed a 1+1 year contract with Azerbaijan Premier League side Gabala FK. On 22 June 2021, Gabala confirmed that Međimorec had left the club with the expiration of his contract.

On 10 July 2024, Međimorec joined Norwegian club Aalesund on a loan-deal.

== Career statistics ==
=== Club ===
As of match played 7 May 2022

Club statistics
Club	Season	League			Cup		Continental		Other		Total	
Club	Season	Division	Apps	Goals	Apps	Goals	Apps	Goals	Apps	Goals	Apps	Goals
Slaven Belupo	2015–16	Prva HNL	21	0	3	0	–		–		24	0
Slaven Belupo	2016–17	Prva HNL	8	1	1	0	–		–		9	1
Slaven Belupo	2017–18	Prva HNL	22	2	2	0	–		–		24	2
Slaven Belupo	2018–19	Prva HNL	27	0	2	0	–		–		29	0
Slaven Belupo	2019–20	Prva HNL	12	1	0	0	–		–		12	1
Slaven Belupo	Total		90	4	8	0	-	-	-	-	98	4
Gabala	2020–21	Azerbaijan Premier League	23	1	3	0	–		–		26	1
UTA Arad	2021–22	Liga I	23	0	1	0	–		–		24	0
Career total			136	5	12	0	-	-	-	-	148	5

== Honours ==
Slaven Belupo

- Croatian Cup runner-up: 2015–16
