= Roman Huseynov =

Azerbaijani footballer (born 1997)

Personal information
- Full name: Roman Rovshan oglu Huseynov
- Date of birth: 26 December 1997 (age 28)
- Place of birth: Julfa, Azerbaijan
- Height: 1.76 m (5 ft 9 in)
- Position: Midfielder

Team information
- Current team: Sabail FK
- Number: 77

Youth career
- Gabala

Senior career*
| Years | Team | Apps | (Gls) |
| 2015–2021 | Gabala | 19 | (2) |
| 2018 | → Kapaz (loan) | 11 | (0) |
| 2021–2022 | Sumgayit | 3 | (0) |
| 2022 | Kapaz | | |
| 2022–2024 | Mingachevir | 2 | (2) |
| 2024 | Shamakhi | 1 | (1) |
| 2024–2025 | Karvan | 4 | (4) |
| 2025–2026 | Difai | 1 | (1) |
| 2026– | Sabail | 0 | (0) |

International career^{‡}
| 2013 | Azerbaijan U17 | 3 | (0) |
| 2015 | Azerbaijan U19 | 5 | (0) |
- * Club domestic league appearances and goals as of 17 January 2026 ‡ National team caps and goals as of 22 September 2020

Roman Huseynov (Azerbaijani: Roman Hüseynov; born on 26 December 1997) is an Azerbaijani football midfielder who plays for Sabail FK in the Azerbaijan Premier League.

== Career ==
=== Club ===
On 15 August 2015, Huseynov made his debut in the Azerbaijan Premier League for Gabala match against Shuvalan.

On 25 June 2021, Huseynov signed a one-year contract with Sumgayit. On 6 January 2022, after making 4 appearances for the club, Huseynov was released by Sumgayit.

On 15 January 2026, Sabail FK signed a contract with Huseynov until the end of the season.

== Statistics ==
=== Club ===
As of match played 15 December 2021

Appearances and goals by club, season and competition
| Club | Season | League | | | National Cup | | Continental | | Other | | Total | |
| Club | Season | Division | Apps | Goals | Apps | Goals | Apps | Goals | Apps | Goals | Apps | Goals |
|---|---|---|---|---|---|---|---|---|---|---|---|---|
| Gabala | 2014–15 | Azerbaijan Premier League | 0 | 0 | 0 | 0 | 0 | 0 | – | | 0 | 0 |
| Gabala | 2015–16 | Azerbaijan Premier League | 3 | 0 | 1 | 0 | 0 | 0 | – | | 4 | 0 |
| Gabala | 2016–17 | Azerbaijan Premier League | 6 | 1 | 3 | 0 | 1 | 0 | – | | 10 | 1 |
| Gabala | 2017–18 | Azerbaijan Premier League | 4 | 0 | 1 | 0 | 0 | 0 | – | | 5 | 0 |
| Gabala | 2018–19 | Azerbaijan Premier League | 3 | 0 | 0 | 0 | 1 | 0 | – | | 4 | 0 |
| Gabala | 2019–20 | Azerbaijan Premier League | 13 | 1 | 2 | 0 | 1 | 0 | – | | 16 | 1 |
| Gabala | 2020–21 | Azerbaijan Premier League | 6 | 0 | 1 | 0 | – | | – | | 7 | 0 |
| Gabala | Total | | 35 | 1 | 7 | 0 | 3 | 0 | - | - | 46 | 1 |
| Kapaz (loan) | 2017–18 | Azerbaijan Premier League | 11 | 0 | 0 | 0 | – | | – | | 11 | 0 |
| Sumgayit | 2021–22 | Azerbaijan Premier League | 3 | 0 | 0 | 0 | 1 | 0 | – | | 4 | 0 |
| Career total | | | 46 | 1 | 7 | 0 | 4 | 0 | - | - | 57 | 1 |

== Honours ==
Gabala

- Azerbaijan Cup (1): 2018–19
