= Jamal Arago =

Liberian footballer (born 1993)

Personal information
- Date of birth: 28 August 1993 (age 33)
- Place of birth: Accra, Ghana
- Height: 1.85 m (6 ft 1 in)
- Position: Centre-back

Youth career
- –2009: Berekum Chelsea
- 2009–2011: Twente
- 2011–2012: Atromitos

Senior career*
| Years | Team | Apps | (Gls) |
| 2012–2013 | Atromitos | 0 | (0) |
| 2016 | Gjilani | 4 | (0) |
| 2016–2017 | AC Kajaani | 23 | (0) |
| 2018–2019 | Prishtina | 43 | (1) |
| 2020–2021 | Drita | 27 | (0) |
| 2021–2022 | Sabail | 25 | (1) |
| 2022–2023 | Ohod | 17 | (0) |
| 2023–2024 | Al-Ahly Benghazi | | |
| 2024–2025 | Gjilani | 31 | (0) |
| 2026– | Samaleswari | | |

International career^{‡}
| 2021– | Liberia | 11 | (0) |
- * Club domestic league appearances and goals as of 26 June 2025 ‡ National team caps and goals as of 20 November 2023

Jamal Arago (born 28 August 1993) is a professional footballer who plays as a centre-back for the Indian Football League club Samaleswari. Born in Ghana, he represents the Liberia national team.

== Club career ==
In 2009, Arago won the reality show MTN Soccer Academy. After that, he joined the youth academy of Dutch side FC Twente.

He then signed for Atromitos in the Greek top flight.

Before the second half of 2015–16, Arago signed for Kosovan club Gjilani. In 2016, he signed for AC Kajaani in Finland.

In 2021, he signed for Azerbaijani team Sabail. On 14 August 2021, Arago debuted for Sabail during a 1–0 win over Sabah (Azerbaijan).

On 26 July 2022, Arago joined Saudi Arabian club Ohod.

== International career ==
Born in Ghana, Arago is of Liberian descent through a grandmother. He debuted for the Liberia national team in a 2–0 2022 FIFA World Cup qualification loss to Nigeria on 13 November 2021.
