= Elkhan Ahmadov =

Azerbaijani footballer (born 1993)

Personal information
- Full name: Elkhan Gardashkhan oglu Ahmadov
- Date of birth: 2 July 1993 (age 33)
- Place of birth: Baku, Azerbaijan
- Height: 1.86 m (6 ft 1 in)
- Position: Goalkeeper

Senior career*
| Years | Team | Apps | (Gls) |
| 2013–2015 | Baku | 24 | (0) |
| 2015–2017 | Mughan | 15 | (0) |
| 2017–2022 | Sabail | 13 | (0) |
| 2024 | MOIK Baku | | |
- * Club domestic league appearances and goals as of 21 May 2022

Elkhan Ahmadov (Azerbaijani: Elxan Əhmədov; born 2 July 1993) is an Azerbaijani football goalkeeper.

== Club career ==
On 20 October 2013, Ahmadov made his debut in the Azerbaijan Premier League for Baku match against Shuvalan.
