= Asim Alizade =

Azerbaijani footballer (born 2000)

Personal information
- Full name: Asim Khosrov oglu Alizade
- Date of birth: 5 February 2000 (age 26)
- Place of birth: Azerbaijan
- Height: 1.77 m (5 ft 10 in)
- Position: Midfielder

Team information
- Current team: Sabail
- Number: 11

Senior career*
| Years | Team | Apps | (Gls) |
| 2020–2022 | Neftchi Baku | 1 | (0) |
| 2022 | → Daugavpils (loan) | 9 | (0) |
| 2022–2023 | Şamaxı | 9 | (0) |
| 2023–2024 | Iravan | | |
| 2024–2025 | Baku Sporting | | |
| 2025– | Sabail | 9 | (0) |

International career^{‡}
| 2021–2022 | Azerbaijan U21 | 10 | (0) |
- * Club domestic league appearances and goals as of 24 December 2025 ‡ National team caps and goals as of 25 September 2022

Asim Khosrov oglu Alizade (Azerbaijani: Asim Xosrov oğlu Əlizadə; born 5 February 2000) is an Azerbaijani footballer who plays as a midfielder for Azerbaijan First League club Sabail.

== Club career ==
On 20 December 2020, Alizade made his debut in the Azerbaijan Premier League for Neftçi PFK in a 2–0 win against Sabah FC.
