= Kamran İbrahimov =

Azerbaijani footballer (born 1999)

Personal information
- Full name: Kamran Tahir oğlu İbrahimov
- Date of birth: 7 June 1999 (age 27)
- Place of birth: Azerbaijan
- Height: 1.89 m (6 ft 2 in)
- Position: Goalkeeper

Team information
- Current team: Karvan İK
- Number: 1

Youth career
- Neftçi

Senior career*
Years	Team	Apps	(Gls)
2021–2022	Neftçi	9	(0)
2022–24	Kapaz	11	(0)
2024-	Karvan İK	15	(0)

International career^{‡}
2015–2016	Azerbaijan U17	2	(0)
2018–2020	Azerbaijan U21	15	(0)
- * Club domestic league appearances and goals as of 22 June 2026 ‡ National team caps and goals as of 1 October 2022

Kamran Tahir oğlu İbrahimov (born 7 June 1999) is an Azerbaijani footballer who plays as a goalkeeper for Kapaz in the Azerbaijan Premier League.

== Club career ==
On 15 August 2021, İbrahimov made his debut in the Azerbaijan Premier League for Neftçi match against Zira.
