= Jabir Amirli =

Azerbaijani footballer (born 1997)

Personal information
- Full name: Jabir Alim oglu Amirli
- Date of birth: 6 January 1997 (age 29)
- Place of birth: Baku, Azerbaijan
- Height: 1.78 m (5 ft 10 in)
- Position: Right-back

Team information
- Current team: Mingachevir
- Number: 6

Senior career*
Years	Team	Apps	(Gls)
2017–2020	Keşla	45	(1)
2020–2021	Neftçi Baku	4	(0)
2021	→ Sumgayit (loan)	7	(0)
2021–2025	Sabail	78	(1)
2025–	Mingachevir	2	(0)

International career^{‡}
2018	Azerbaijan U21	1	(0)
- * Club domestic league appearances and goals as of 23 October 2025 ‡ National team caps and goals as of 15 September 2020

Jabir Amirli (Azerbaijani: Cabir Əmirli; born 6 January 1997) is an Azerbaijani footballer who plays as a defender for Mingachevir in the Azerbaijan First League.

== Club career ==
On 24 April 2017, Amirli made his debut in the Azerbaijan Premier League for Keşla in a 3–4 defeat against Gabala.

== Honours ==
Keşla

- Azerbaijan Cup: 2017–18
