= Elshan Abdullayev =

Azerbaijani footballer (born 1993)

Personal information
- Full name: Elshan Mubariz oglu Abdullayev
- Date of birth: 5 February 1994 (age 32)
- Place of birth: Sumgayit, Azerbaijan
- Height: 1.70 m (5 ft 7 in)
- Position: Midfielder

Team information
- Current team: Sumgayit
- Number: 24

Senior career*
Years	Team	Apps	(Gls)
2012–2016	Neftçi Baku	57	(5)
2013	→ Sumgayit (loan)	17	(1)
2017–2018	Qarabağ	7	(1)
2018	→ Zira (loan)	9	(1)
2018–2021	Sabah	13	(1)
2021–2022	Sabail	2	(0)
2022–	Sumgayit	10	(0)

International career^{‡}
2010	Azerbaijan U17	3	(0)
2011–2012	Azerbaijan U19	4	(0)
2013–2016	Azerbaijan U21	12	(1)
2017	Azerbaijan U23	5	(1)
Medal record
Men's football
Representing Azerbaijan
Islamic Solidarity Games
Winner	2017 Azerbaijan
- * Club domestic league appearances and goals as of 4 May 2023 ‡ National team caps and goals as of 20 September 2020

Elshan Abdullayev (Azerbaijani: Elşən Abdullayev, born on 5 September 1993) is an Azerbaijani footballer who plays as a midfielder for Sumgayit in the top-tier Azerbaijan Premier League.

== Club career ==
Abdullayev made his debut in the Azerbaijan Premier League for Neftçi Baku on 15 February 2012, in a match against Sumgayit with his team winning 3–0.

== Honours ==
=== Club ===
Neftçi

- Azerbaijan Premier League (2): 2011–12, 2012–13
- Azerbaijan Cup (2): 2012–13, 2013–14

Qarabağ

- Azerbaijan Premier League (1): 2016–17
- Azerbaijan Cup (1): 2016–17

=== International ===
Azerbaijan U23

- Islamic Solidarity Games: (1) 2017
