= Idris Ingilabli =

Azerbaijani footballer (born 2001)

Personal information
- Full name: Idris Samad oglu Ingilabli
- Date of birth: 6 October 2001 (age 25)
- Place of birth: Quzanlı, Ağdam, Azerbaijan
- Height: 1.75 m (5 ft 9 in)
- Position: Midfielder

Team information
- Current team: Sabah

Youth career
- Gabala

Senior career*
Years	Team	Apps	(Gls)
2019–2020	Gabala	3	(0)
2020–	Sabah	0	(0)
2020–2021	→ Gabala (loan)	15	(0)
2023	→ Kapaz (loan)	12	(0)

International career
2018–2019	Azerbaijan U19	8	(0)
- * Club domestic league appearances and goals as of 1 June 2023

Idris Ingilabli (Azerbaijani: İdris İnqilablı; born on 6 October 2001) is an Azerbaijani professional footballer who plays as a midfielder for Sabah, in the Azerbaijan Premier League.

== Club career ==
On 25 August 2019, Ingilabli made his debut in the Azerbaijan Premier League for Gabala in a match against Qarabağ.

On 4 June 2020, Ingilabli signed a four-year contract with Sabah FC.

On 3 January 2023, Ingilabli joined Kapaz on loan for the remainder of the season.
