= Domantas Šimkus =

Lithuanian footballer (born 1996)

Personal information
- Date of birth: 10 February 1996 (age 30)
- Place of birth: Šiauliai, Lithuania
- Height: 1.74 m (5 ft 9 in)
- Position: Midfielder

Team information
- Current team: Marsaxlokk
- Number: 33

Youth career
- –2013: NFA
- 2013–2015: Aalborg BK

Senior career*
Years	Team	Apps	(Gls)
2016–2018	Atlantas	59	(3)
2018–2020	Žalgiris	58	(4)
2021	Hapoel Kfar Saba	12	(0)
2021–2022	Sabail	24	(1)
2022–2023	Mura	15	(0)
2023–2025	Šiauliai	59	(1)
2025	Hamrun Spartans	12	(0)
2026–	Marsaxlokk	16	(1)

International career^{‡}
2012	Lithuania U17 (Note: Official competitive UEFA matches only.)	3	(0)
2013–2015	Lithuania U19	10	(1)
2015–2019	Lithuania U21	12	(0)
2018–	Lithuania	30	(0)
- * Club domestic league appearances and goals as of 7 May 2026 ‡ National team caps and goals as of 27 March 2023

Domantas Šimkus (born 10 February 1996) is a Lithuanian footballer who plays as a midfielder for Maltese club Marsaxlokk.

== Club career ==
On 22 August 2022, Šimkus signed a two-year contract with Slovenian PrvaLiga side Mura. He made his debut against Gorica on 2 September 2022 in a goalless draw.

On 5 July 2023, Šimkus signed a contract with his hometown club Šiauliai.

In June 2025 announced that Domantas Šimkus transfermed to maltese Hamrun Spartans Club.

== International career ==
Šimkus made his Lithuania national football team debut on 17 November 2018 in a 2018–19 UEFA Nations League C game against Romania.
