= Elchin Rahimli =

Azerbaijani footballer (born 1996)

Personal information
- Full name: Elchin Mukhtar oglu Rahimli
- Date of birth: 17 June 1996 (age 30)
- Place of birth: Azerbaijan
- Height: 1.80 m (5 ft 11 in)
- Position: Midfielder

Team information
- Current team: Shafa Baku
- Number: 8

Youth career
- Qarabağ

Senior career*
Years	Team	Apps	(Gls)
2018–2022	Sabail	39	(0)
2022–2023	Shamakhi	11	(0)
2024	Füzuli		
2024–	Shafa Baku		
- * Club domestic league appearances and goals as of 27 May 2023

Elchin Rahimli (Azerbaijani: Elçin Rəhimli; born 4 June 1996) is an Azerbaijani footballer who plays as a midfielder for Shafa Baku.

== Club career ==
On 10 November 2018, Rahimli made his debut in the Azerbaijan Premier League for Sabail match against Sabah.
