= Nicolas Rajsel =

Slovenian footballer (born 1993)

Personal information
- Full name: Nicolas Antoine Rajsel
- Date of birth: 31 May 1993 (age 33)
- Place of birth: Pontoise, France
- Height: 1.80 m (5 ft 11 in)
- Position: Winger

Team information
- Current team: Tubize-Braine
- Number: 32

Youth career
- –2011: Paris Saint-Germain

Senior career*
Years	Team	Apps	(Gls)
2011–2013	Paris Saint-Germain II	20	(3)
2014	Celje	16	(1)
2014–2017	Union SG	77	(33)
2017–2020	Oostende	5	(0)
2018–2019	→ Roeselare (loan)	22	(3)
2020–2021	Gabala	30	(7)
2021–2022	Sabail	19	(5)
2022–2024	Dender	47	(7)
2024–2025	Kotwica Kołobrzeg	10	(0)
2025	Warta Poznań	11	(0)
2025–	Tubize-Braine	30	(6)

International career
2014	Slovenia U21	1	(1)
- * Club domestic league appearances and goals as of 15:31, 4 May 2026 (UTC)

Nicolas Antoine Rajsel (born 31 May 1993) is a Slovenian professional footballer who plays as a winger for Belgian club Tubize-Braine. Born in France, Rajsel represented Slovenia at under-21 level.

== Career ==
On 4 February 2020, Rajsel signed a one-and-a-half-year contract with Azerbaijani club Gabala FK.

On 6 September 2021, Rajsel signed a one-year contract with Sabail.

On 8 September 2024, after spending the previous two years at Dender, Rajsel joined Polish second-tier club Kotwica Kołobrzeg.

On 6 February 2025, Rajsel moved to fellow I liga club Warta Poznań on a deal until the end of the season.

In June 2025, Rajsel returned to Belgium to join third division side Tubize-Braine.

== Career statistics ==
As of match played 11 May 2025

Appearances and goals by club, season and competition
Club	Season	League			National cup (Note: Includes Belgian Cup, Azerbaijan Cup, Polish Cup)		Europe		Other		Total	
Club	Season	Division	Apps	Goals	Apps	Goals	Apps	Goals	Apps	Goals	Apps	Goals
Paris Saint-Germain Reserves	2012–13	CFA	20	3	—		—		—		20	3
Celje	2013–14	Slovenian PrvaLiga	13	1	0	0	—		—		13	1
Celje	2014–15	Slovenian PrvaLiga	3	0	0	0	—		—		3	0
Celje	Total		16	1	0	0	0	0	0	0	16	1
Union Saint-Gilloise	2014–15	Belgian Third Division	25	11	0	0	—		—		25	11
Union Saint-Gilloise	2015–16	Belgian Second Division	30	12	2	0	—		—		32	12
Union Saint-Gilloise	2016–17	Belgian First Division B	22	10	1	0	—		8 (Note: Appearances in Belgian Europa League play-offs)	3	31	13
Union Saint-Gilloise	Total		77	33	3	0	0	0	8	3	88	36
Oostende	2017–18	Belgian First Division A	1	0	0	0	0	0	—		1	0
Oostende	2018–19	Belgian First Division A	2	0	0	0	—		—		2	0
Oostende	2019–20	Belgian First Division A	2	0	1	1	—		—		3	1
Oostende	Total		5	0	0	0	0	0	0	0	6	1
Roeselare (loan)	2018–19	Belgian First Division B	22	3	0	0	—		—		20	3
Gabala	2019–20	Azerbaijan Premier League	4	4	0	0	0	0	—		4	4
Gabala	2020–21	Azerbaijan Premier League	26	3	3	0	—		—		29	3
Gabala	Total		30	7	3	0	0	0	—		33	7
Sabail	2021–22	Azerbaijan Premier League	19	5	2	0	—		—		21	5
Dender	2022–23	Challenger Pro League	24	5	2	1	—		—		26	6
Dender	2023–24	Challenger Pro League	23	2	2	1	—		—		25	3
Dender	Total		47	7	4	2	—		—		51	9
Kotwica Kołobrzeg	2024–25	I liga	10	0	2	1	—		—		12	1
Warta Poznań	2024–25	I liga	11	0	—		—		—		11	0
Career total			257	59	15	4	0	0	8	3	280	66
