= Samir Gurbanov =

Azerbaijani footballer (born 2001)

Personal information
- Full name: Samir Davud oglu Gurbanov
- Date of birth: 12 March 2001 (age 25)
- Place of birth: Azerbaijan
- Height: 1.71 m (5 ft 7 in)
- Position: Winger

Youth career
- 2012–2018: Gabala

Senior career*
Years	Team	Apps	(Gls)
2019–2021	Gabala	1	(0)
2019–2020	→ Viktoria Žižkov (loan)	0	(0)
2021	→ Kapaz (loan)		
2021	Zira	0	(0)
2022	Shamakhi	0	(0)

International career
2017	Azerbaijan U17	3	(0)
2018–2019	Azerbaijan U19	5	(0)
- * Club domestic league appearances and goals as of 17:06, 28 February 2023 (UTC)

Samir Gurbanov (Azerbaijani: Samir Qurbanov; born on 12 March 2001) is an Azerbaijani professional footballer who plays as a winger.

== Club career ==
On 11 May 2019, Gurbanov made his debut in the Azerbaijan Premier League for Gabala match against Sumgayit.

On 24 August 2019, it was announced that Gurbanov had joined Czech club FK Viktoria Žižkov on loan.

== Honours ==
Gabala

- Azerbaijan Cup (1): 2018–19
