= Mahammad Mirzabeyov =

Russian-Azerbaijani footballer (born 1990)

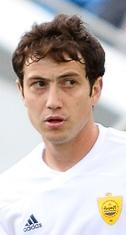
- Mirzabeyov with Anzhi in 2011

Personal information
- Date of birth: 16 November 1990 (age 35)
- Place of birth: Makhachkala, Russia
- Height: 1.68 m (5 ft 6 in)
- Position: Right back

Senior career*
Years	Team	Apps	(Gls)
2006–2007	Torpedo Moscow (reserves)		
2008	Torpedo Moscow	0	(0)
2009	Torpedo-ZIL Moscow	22	(0)
2010–2012	Anzhi Makhachkala	0	(0)
2012–2014	Sumgayit	62	(1)
2014–2015	Inter Baku	30	(4)
2015–2017	Gabala	46	(0)
2017–2019	Neftchi Baku	31	(0)
2019–2021	Sabah	25	(0)
2021–2022	Sabail	21	(0)

International career
2007	Russia U18	6	(1)
2008	Russia U19	4	(0)
2015–2017	Azerbaijan	18	(0)
- * Club domestic league appearances and goals

Mahammad Mirzabeyov (Azerbaijani: Mahammad Mirzəbəyov; born 16 November 1990) is a Russian-Azerbaijani former professional football player of Dargin descent.

== Career ==
=== Club ===
==== Russia ====
Mirzabeyov made his professional debut for Anzhi Makhachkala on 14 July 2010 against FC Pskov-747 Pskov.

==== Azerbaijan ====
On 30 May 2014, Mirzabeyov signed a one-year contract with Inter Baku.

In June 2015, Mirzabeyov signed for Gabala FK, leaving the club two-years later in May 2017.

Neftchi Baku confirmed Mirzabeyov's release after two-years with the club on 15 May 2019.

=== International ===
==== National youth teams of Russia ====
He won with the over U-18 and U-19 teams, against Iraq and Iran.

==== Azerbaijan ====
He was called up to the Azerbaijan, won goals on matches against France.

== Career statistics ==
=== Club ===
As of Match played 5 May 2017

Appearances and goals by club, season and competition
Club	Season	League			National Cup		Continental		Total	
Club	Season	Division	Apps	Goals	Apps	Goals	Apps	Goals	Apps	Goals
Torpedo-ZIL	2009	Professional Football League	22	0	2	0	-		24	0
Anzhi Makhachkala	2010	Russian Premier League	0	0	1	0	-		1	0
Anzhi Makhachkala	2011–12	Russian Premier League	0	0	1	0	-		1	0
Anzhi Makhachkala	Total		0	0	2	0	-	-	2	0
Sumgayit	2012–13	Azerbaijan Premier League	28	1	0	0	-		28	1
Sumgayit	2013–14	Azerbaijan Premier League	34	0	1	0	-		35	0
Sumgayit	Total		62	1	1	0	-	-	63	1
Inter Baku	2014–15	Azerbaijan Premier League	30	4	3	0	0	0	33	4
Gabala	2015–16	Azerbaijan Premier League	25	0	3	0	1	0	29	0
Gabala	2016–17	Azerbaijan Premier League	21	0	2	0	10	0	33	0
Gabala	Total		46	0	5	0	11	0	62	0
Career total			160	5	13	0	11	0	184	5

=== International ===
Azerbaijan
Year	Apps	Goals
2015	5	0
2016	8	0
2017	2	0
Total	15	0

Statistics accurate as of match played 26 March 2017
