= Ruslan Hajiyev =

Azerbaijani footballer (born 1998)

Personal information
- Full name: Ruslan Ramiz oglu Hajiyev
- Date of birth: 26 March 1998 (age 28)
- Place of birth: Baku, Azerbaijan
- Height: 1.80 m (5 ft 11 in)
- Position: Winger

Team information
- Current team: Shahdag Qusar
- Number: 70

Senior career*
Years	Team	Apps	(Gls)
2018–2023	Qarabağ	1	(0)
2019–2023	→ Sabail (loan)	65	(2)
2023	İravan		
2024	İmişli		
2024–	Shahdag Qusar		

International career^{‡}
2016	Azerbaijan U19	3	(0)
- * Club domestic league appearances and goals as of 27 May 2023 ‡ National team caps and goals as of 20 September 2020

Ruslan Hajiyev (Azerbaijani: Ruslan Hacıyev, born on 26 March 1998) is an Azerbaijani footballer who plays as a winger for Shahdag Qusar.

== Club career ==
On 12 May 2018, Hajiyev made his debut in the Azerbaijan Premier League for Qarabağ match against Keşla.

== Honours ==
Qarabağ

- Azerbaijan Premier League: 2017–18
