= Jurgen Goxha =

Albanian footballer (born 1992)

Personal information
- Date of birth: 29 December 1992 (age 33)
- Place of birth: Durrës, Albania
- Height: 1.83 m (6 ft 0 in)
- Position: Defender

Team information
- Current team: Bylis

Senior career*
Years	Team	Apps	(Gls)
2014–2015	Iliria	22	(2)
2015–2016	Erzeni	21	(2)
2016	Besëlidhja	9	(0)
2017	Shënkolli	7	(0)
2017–2018	Erzeni	37	(8)
2019–2020	Tirana	12	(0)
2019–2020	→ Bylis (loan)	17	(4)
2020–2021	Gabala	24	(2)
2021–2022	Sabail	17	(2)
2022–2023	Egnatia	2	(0)
2023	→ Teuta Durrës (loan)	11	(1)
2023–2024	Bylis	19	(0)
2024–	Besa Kavajë	10	(1)
- * Club domestic league appearances and goals as of 9 March 2024

Jurgen Goxha (born 29 December 1992) is an Albanian professional footballer who plays as a defender for Besa Kavajë.

== Career ==
In the first part of 2018–19, while representing Erzeni, Goxha was utilised as a striker by coach Gentian Stojku, scoring 7 goals in 12 appearances in Albanian First Division. His performances attracted the attention of Tirana, who made a bid for the player in the winter transfer window.

On 28 January 2019, Tirana announced the signing of Goxha on an 18-month contract. He made his debut for his new side on 1 February in a 1–1 home draw against Teuta Durrës, entering in 73rd minute in place of fellow defender Erion Hoxhallari. He was released in August of that year, concluding the second part of 2018–19 season with 16 appearances, including 12 in league.

On 16 August 2019, two days after he was released by Tirana, Goxha joined newly promoted top flight side Bylis Ballsh. He scored his first Albanian Superliga goal on 28 September in a 5–0 home rout of Flamurtari Vlorë, netting the second in the 33rd minute.

On 10 August 2020, Goxha signed a 1+1 year contract with Azerbaijan Premier League side Gabala FK.

On 7 August 2021, Goxha signed for Sabail on a one-year contract.

== Personal life ==
Goxha is a lifelong fan of Albanian club Tirana, for which he played in the second half of 2018–19 season.

== Career statistics ==
As of 7 December 2019

Appearances and goals by club, season and competition
Club	Season	League			Cup		Other		Total	
Club	Season	Division	Apps	Goals	Apps	Goals	Apps	Goals	Apps	Goals
Iliria	2014–15	Albanian First Division	22	2	2	0	—		24	2
Erzeni	2015–16	Albanian First Division	21	2	1	0	—		22	2
Besëlidhja Lezhë	2016–17	Albanian First Division	9	0	4	1	—		13	1
Shënkolli	2017–18	Albanian First Division	7	0	0	0	—		7	0
Erzeni	2017–18	Albanian First Division	25	1	4	1	—		29	2
Erzeni	2018–19	Albanian First Division	12	7	2	0	—		14	7
Erzeni	Total		37	8	6	1	—		43	9
Tirana	2018–19	Albanian Superliga	12	0	4	0	—		16	0
Bylis Ballsh	2019–20	Albanian Superliga	13	3	1	1	—		14	4
Career total			121	15	18	3	—		139	18

== Honours ==
Tirana

- Albanian Cup runner-up: 2018–19
