= Yusif Nabiyev =

Azerbaijani footballer (born 1997)

Personal information
- Full name: Yusif Ayaz oglu Nabiyev
- Date of birth: 3 September 1997 (age 29)
- Place of birth: Ağstafa, Azerbaijan
- Height: 1.79 m (5 ft 10 in)
- Position: Left-back

Team information
- Current team: Sabail
- Number: 74

Youth career
- Gabala

Senior career*
| Years | Team | Apps | (Gls) |
| 2016–2017 | Gabala | 0 | (0) |
| 2016–2017 | → Sumgayit (loan) | 18 | (3) |
| 2017 | Zira | 7 | (0) |
| 2018–2021 | Gabala | 31 | (2) |
| 2018–2019 | → Sumgayit (loan) | 21 | (1) |
| 2021–2022 | Sumgayit | 11 | (0) |
| 2022–2023 | Kapaz | 34 | (2) |
| 2023– | Sabail | 64 | (5) |

International career^{‡}
| 2013 | Azerbaijan U17 | 3 | (0) |
| 2014–2015 | Azerbaijan U19 | 8 | (0) |
| 2016–2018 | Azerbaijan U21 | 7 | (0) |
Medal record
Men's football
Representing Azerbaijan
Islamic Solidarity Games
| Winner | 2017 Azerbaijan |
- * Club domestic league appearances and goals as of 27 June 2025 ‡ National team caps and goals as of 18 September 2020

Yusif Nabiyev (Azerbaijani: Yusif Ayaz oğlu Nəbiyev; born on 3 September 1997) is an Azerbaijani professional footballer who plays as a defender for Sabail in the Azerbaijan Premier League.

== Career ==
=== Club ===
On 6 August 2016, Nabiyev made his debut in the Azerbaijan Premier League for Sumgayit match against Zira.

== Personal life ==
Yusif is the older brother of Viktoria Žižkov player Farid Nabiyev.

== Honours ==
=== International ===
Azerbaijan U23

- Islamic Solidarity Games: (1) 2017
