= Stefan Vukčević =

Montenegrin footballer

Personal information
- Full name: Stefan Vukčević
- Date of birth: 11 April 1997 (age 29)
- Place of birth: Podgorica, FR Yugoslavia
- Height: 1.84 m (6 ft 0 in)
- Position: Midfielder

Team information
- Current team: Grbalj
- Number: 8

Senior career*
Years	Team	Apps	(Gls)
2013–2020	Zeta	173	(4)
2020–2022	Gabala	33	(1)
2022–2023	Enosis Neon Paralimni	28	(1)
2023	Velež Mostar	1	(0)
2024	Budućnost	0	(0)
2025	Rudar	14	(0)
2026–	Grbalj	14	(0)

International career^{‡}
2013	Montenegro U17	3	(0)
2014–2015	Montenegro U19	9	(0)
2017–2018	Montenegro U21	5	(0)
- * Club domestic league appearances and goals as of 18 June 2026 ‡ National team caps and goals as of 20 September 2020

Stefan Vukčević (born 11 April 1997), is a Montenegrin professional footballer who plays as a midfielder for Grbalj.

== Club career ==
On 14 August 2020, Vukčević signed 1+1 years contract with Gabala FK.

On 13 September 2020, Vukčević made his debut in the Azerbaijan Premier League for Gabala match against Sabah.
