= Sabail FK =

Azerbaijani football club based in Baku

- Full name: Səbail Futbol Klubu
- Nickname: Dənizçilər (The Sailors)
- Founded: 2016; 10 years ago
- Ground: ASCO Arena
- Capacity: 3,200
- President: Mirzə Bayrampur
- Manager: Adil Shukurov
- League: Azerbaijan First League
- 2025–26: 3rd
- Website: www.sabailfc.az
Home colours	Away colours

Sabail FK (Azerbaijani: Səbail Futbol Klubu, pronounced [sæbɑːˈil]) is an Azerbaijani football club based in Sabail, Baku. The club participates in the Azerbaijan First League.

== History ==
The club was established in 2016 and immediately joined the Azerbaijan First Division. After finishing their first season in the Azerbaijan Premier League in 7th position, Samir Aliyev left the role as manager by mutual consent on 22 May 2018. Aftandil Hacıyev was appointed as the club's new manager on 11 June 2018.

Sabail's 2024-25 season of the Azerbaijan Premier League was a dismal one. In the first half of the season, the club played 18 matches, winning only 2, drawing 3, and losing 13. As the season progressed, results worsened, and the team fell to the bottom of the league table due to consecutive defeats.

At the beginning of the 2024-25 season, Sabail was managed by Shahin Diniyev. On March 3, 2024, he announced his resignation from the club, and on March 6, the role was temporarily assigned to Elvin Mammadov, the head coach of the club’s U-19 team. On March 11, 2025, Javid Huseynov was appointed as the new head coach. However, the team's struggles continued. On February 11, 2025, Sabail suffered a heavy 0-5 defeat against Qarabağ, one of the season's biggest losses at that point. The challenges persisted, and after a 1-2 loss to Neftçi on March 16, 2025, Hüseynov strongly criticized the club’s management in the post-match press conference. Just hours later, the club announced his dismissal. On March 17, it was announced that Elvin Mammadov was appointed as head coach until the end of the season.

During the 2025–26 season, the club once again made a change in head coach. On 27 November 2025, Elvin Mammadov resigned, and on 29 November, Adil Shukurov was appointed as the new head coach.

=== Domestic history ===
Season	League									Azerbaijan Cup	Top goalscorer		Manager	Manufacturer	Sponsor
Season	Div	Pos	P	W	D	L	GF	GA	Pts	Azerbaijan Cup	Name	League	Manager	Manufacturer	Sponsor
2016–17	2nd	2nd	26	18	3	5	80	25	57	Second round	(Azerbaijan) Bayram Budagov	18	(Azerbaijan) Elman Sultanov	Kappa	Federation support
2017–18	1st	7th	28	6	5	17	19	39	23	Quarter-finals	(Azerbaijan) Vüqar Nadirov	3	(Azerbaijan) Samir Aliyev	Nike	Federation support
2018–19	1st	3rd	28	12	5	11	34	37	41	Quarter-finals	(Azerbaijan) Aghabala Ramazanov	7	(Azerbaijan) Aftandil Hacıyev	Macron	AZ Tea
2019–20	1st	7th	20	5	5	10	16	30	20	Quarter-finals	Three Players	3	(Azerbaijan) Aftandil Hacıyev	Nike	AZ Tea
2020–21	1st	8th	28	5	9	14	21	42	24	Quarter-finals	(Azerbaijan) Amil Yunanov	6	(Azerbaijan) Aftandil Hacıyev	Nike	AZ Tea
2021–22	1st	8th	28	4	3	21	17	57	15	Quarter-finals	(Slovenia) Nicolas Rajsel	5	(Azerbaijan) Aftandil Hacıyev	Nike	AZ Tea
2022–23	1st	9th	36	7	8	21	32	62	29	Semi-finals	(Argentina) Franco Mazurek	6	(Azerbaijan) Mahmud Qurbanov (Azerbaijan) Shahin Diniyev	Jako	ASCO
2023–24	1st	7th	36	11	9	16	50	60	42	Quarter-finals	(Madagascar) Alexandre Ramalingom	15	(Azerbaijan) Shahin Diniyev	Adidas	ASCO

=== European history ===
As of 17 July 2019

Season	Competition	Round	Club	Home	Away	Agg.
2019–20	UEFA Europa League	1QR	(Romania) Universitatea Craiova	2–3	2–3	4–6

Notes

- QR: Qualifying round

== Stadium ==
Sabail's home ground is the Bayil Stadium, which has a capacity of 3,200.

== Players ==
=== Current squad ===
As of 30 September 2025

No.	Pos.	Nation	Player
1	GK	AZE	Rashad Azizli
3	DF	AZE	Zahir Mirzazada
4	MF	AZE	Sabayil Bagirov
5	MF	MLI	Momo Sacko
6	MF	AZE	Azad Asgarov
7	FW	AZE	Nicat Süleymanov
8	MF	AZE	Bahadur Haziyev
10	FW	IRI	Ali Babaei
11	MF	AZE	Asim Alizade
12	GK	AZE	Vüsal Shabanov
14	MF	AZE	Turan Valizade (on loan from Araz-Naxçıvan)
15	DF	AZE	Fakhri Mammadli
16	DF	AZE	Emin Rüstamov
17	MF	AZE	Rahman Hajiyev

No.	Pos.	Nation	Player
19	MF	AZE	Tuhay Alizade
20	DF	AZE	Murad Farzaliyev
21	FW	BRA	Paulinho
22	FW	GHA	Mustapha Yakubu
25	GK	AZE	Fayyaz Mehdizada
30	FW	AZE	Kamran Quliyev
39	DF	AZE	Sadiq Quliyev
44	MF	AZE	Murad Mustafayev
67	MF	AZE	Ravan Abasov
74	DF	AZE	Yusif Nabiyev
83	MF	BRA	Afonso
89	MF	AZE	Ömar Qurbanov
99	FW	AZE	Emil Qasımov

=== Reserve team ===
Sabail-2 plays in the Azerbaijan First Division from 2018.

== Coaching staff ==
Position	Name
Head coach	(Azerbaijan) Adil Shukurov
Assistant coach	(Azerbaijan) Azer Mammadov (Azerbaijan) Karim Diniyev
Goalkeeping coach	(Azerbaijan) Fuad Asadov
Fitness coach	(Azerbaijan) Elmir Khankishiyev
Reserve team head coach	(Azerbaijan) Elman Sultanov

=== Managerial statistics ===
Information correct as of match played 16 March 2025. Only competitive matches are counted.

Name	Nat.	From	To	Duration	P	W	D	L	GS	GA	%W	Honours	Notes
Elman Sultanov	Azerbaijan	10 May 2016	10 May 2017	1 year, 0 days	27	18	3	6	80	30	66.67		
Samir Aliyev	Azerbaijan	10 May 2017	22 May 2018	1 year, 12 days	31	7	5	19	23	45	22.58		
Aftandil Hacıyev	Azerbaijan	11 June 2018	23 May 2022	3 years, 346 days	86	25	20	41	86	124	29.07		
Mahmud Qurbanov	Azerbaijan	26 May 2022	28 December 2022	216 days	21	5	4	12	21	32	23.81		
Shahin Diniyev	Azerbaijan	29 December 2022	3 November 2024	1 year, 310 days	72	21	14	37	122	106	29.17		
Elvin Mammadov	Azerbaijan	6 November 2024	11 November 2024	5 days	1	0	1	0	0	0	0.00		interim
Javid Huseynov	Azerbaijan	11 November 2024	16 March 2025	125 days	16	3	4	9	0	0	18.75		
Elvin Mammadov	Azerbaijan	16 March 2025			0	0	0	0	0	0	—		

- Notes:

P – Total of played matches W – Won matches D – Drawn matches L – Lost matches GS – Goal scored GA – Goals against
%W – Percentage of matches won

Nationality is indicated by the corresponding FIFA country code(s).
