= 2020–21 Zira FK season =

Zira
2020-21 season
- President: Vugar Astanov
- Manager: Rashad Sadygov
- Stadium: Zira Olympic Sport Complex Stadium
- Premier League: 4th
- Azerbaijan Cup: Semifinal vs Keşla
- Top goalscorer: League: Davit Volkovi (8); All: Davit Volkovi (10)

The Zira FK 2020-21 season was Zira's sixth Azerbaijan Premier League season, and seventh season in their history.

== Season events ==
On 17 July, Rashad Sadygov was announced as Zira's new manager on a three-year contract.

On 1 August, Hajiagha Hajili joined Zira on loan from Qarabağ for the season.

On 17 August, Zira announced the signing of Caio Rangel from Ferroviária to a one-year contract, with the option of a second year.

On 1 September, Zira announced the signing of Matheus Albino from Londrina to a two-year contract.

On 5 September, Dimitrios Chantakias signed a one-year contract with Zira.

On 17 September, Gheorghe Anton was released by Zira.

On 5 October, Zira signed Gismat Aliyev from Gabala.

On 26 October, Zira announced the signing of Richard Almeida on a contract until the end of the season.

On 16 December, Caio Rangel left Zira by mutual consent, with Rashad Eyyubov also leaving the club by mutual consent on 21 December.

On 2 January, Musa Gurbanli moved to Zira on loan for the rest of the season from Qarabağ.

On 19 January, Zira announced the signing of Nemanja Anđelković on a 2.5-year contract.

On 29 January, Zira announced the departure of Alie Sesay by mutual consent, with Filipe Pachtmann joining the next day on loan from Lviv until the end of the season, with an option to make the move permanent on a three-year contract at the end of the season.

On 6 March, Zira announced the signing of Rodrigue Bongongui from Hapoel Hadera, with Facundo Melivilo signing from San Martín the following day.

== Squad ==
As of match played 19 May 2021

No.	Name	Nationality	Position	Date of birth (age)	Signed from	Signed in	Contract ends	Apps.	Goals
Goalkeepers
1	Matheus Albino	(Brazil)	GK	4 February 1995 (aged 26)	Londrina	2020	2022	30	0
22	Rashad Azizli	(Azerbaijan)	GK	1 January 1994 (aged 27)	Keşla	2020	2021	3	0
31	Nail Alışov	(Azerbaijan)	GK	30 July 2000 (aged 20)	Neftçi	2020		0	0
62	Abdulla Seyidahmadov	(Azerbaijan)	GK	4 June 1997 (aged 23)	Trainee	2017		2	0
Defenders
2	Sertan Tashkin	(Azerbaijan)	DF	8 October 1997 (aged 23)	Keşla	2020	2022	28	0
5	Karim Diniyev	(Azerbaijan)	DF	5 September 1993 (aged 27)	Sabah	2020	2021	3	0
6	Ayxan Süleymanlı	(Azerbaijan)	DF	16 January 2004 (aged 17)	Trainee	2020		1	0
12	Lazar Đorđević	(Serbia)	DF	14 July 1992 (aged 28)	Radnički Niš	2020	2022	21	1
13	Shahriyar Rahimov	(Azerbaijan)	DF	6 April 1989 (aged 32)	Sabail	2020	2022	10	0
26	Nemanja Anđelković	(Serbia)	DF	26 April 1997 (aged 24)	Zlatibor Čajetina	2021	2023	19	3
44	Dimitrios Chantakias	(Greece)	DF	4 January 1995 (aged 26)	Cherno More	2020	2021	28	1
77	Jalal Huseynov	(Azerbaijan)	DF	2 January 2003 (aged 18)	Trainee	2020		10	0
Midfielders
4	Elvin Jamalov	(Azerbaijan)	MF	4 February 1995 (aged 26)	Gabala	2019	2021	49	0
7	Tural Bayramli	(Azerbaijan)	MF	7 January 1998 (aged 23)	Keşla	2020	2021	19	0
8	Ilkin Muradov	(Azerbaijan)	MF	5 March 1996 (aged 25)	Academy	2019		97	3
20	Ali Shirinov	(Azerbaijan)	MF	9 August 1998 (aged 22)	Daugavpils	2020		4	0
21	Hajiagha Hajili	(Azerbaijan)	MF	30 January 1998 (aged 23)	loan from Qarabağ	2020	2021	29	0
27	Tamerlan Burcəliyev	(Azerbaijan)	MF	27 January 2003 (aged 18)	Trainee	2020		1	0
30	Richard Almeida	(Azerbaijan)	MF	20 March 1989 (aged 32)	Baniyas	2020	2021	23	0
32	Gismat Aliyev	(Azerbaijan)	MF	24 October 1996 (aged 24)	Gabala	2020	2022	26	2
Forwards
9	Davit Volkovi	(Georgia (country))	FW	3 June 1995 (aged 25)	Gabala	2020	2021	35	11
10	Aghabala Ramazanov	(Azerbaijan)	FW	20 January 1993 (aged 28)	Sabail	2020	2021	28	9
11	Clésio	(Mozambique)	FW	11 October 1994 (aged 26)	Gabala	2020	2021	32	6
14	Facundo Melivilo	(Argentina)	FW	12 August 1992 (aged 28)	San Martín	2021	2021	4	2
17	Rodrigue Bongongui	(Cameroon)	FW	7 February 1993 (aged 28)	Hapoel Hadera	2021	2021	12	1
29	Musa Gurbanli	(Azerbaijan)	FW	13 April 2002 (aged 19)	loan from Qarabağ	2021	2021	11	2
91	Ruslan Gurbanov	(Azerbaijan)	FW	12 September 1991 (aged 29)	Sabail	2020	2022	16	1
99	Filipe Pachtmann	(Brazil)	FW	11 April 2000 (aged 21)	loan from Lviv	2021	2021	3	0
Left during the season
3	Alie Sesay	(Sierra Leone)	DF	2 August 1994 (aged 26)	Arda Kardzhali	2020	2021	9	0
14	Rashad Eyyubov	(Azerbaijan)	MF	3 December 1992 (aged 28)	Sabah	2020	2021	3	0
17	Caio Rangel	(Brazil)	FW	16 January 1996 (aged 25)	Ferroviária	2020	2021 (+1)	3	0
18	Gheorghe Anton	(Moldova)	MF	27 January 1993 (aged 28)	Sheriff Tiraspol	2020	2021	6	0

== Transfers ==
=== In ===
Date	Position	Nationality	Name	From	Fee	Ref.
18 July 2020	DF	(Azerbaijan)	Sertan Tashkin	Sumgayit	Undisclosed	
18 July 2020	DF	(Azerbaijan)	Karim Diniyev	Sabah	Undisclosed	
18 July 2020	MF	(Azerbaijan)	Rashad Eyyubov	Sabah	Undisclosed	
18 July 2020	FW	(Mozambique)	Clésio	Gabala	Free	
19 July 2020	GK	(Azerbaijan)	Rashad Azizli	Keşla	Undisclosed	
19 July 2020	DF	(Azerbaijan)	Shahriyar Rahimov	Sabail	Undisclosed	
19 July 2020	MF	(Azerbaijan)	Tural Bayramli	Keşla	Undisclosed	
19 July 2020	FW	(Azerbaijan)	Ruslan Gurbanov	Keşla	Undisclosed	
29 July 2020	FW	(Serbia)	Lazar Đorđević	Radnički Niš	Undisclosed	
17 August 2020	FW	(Brazil)	Caio Rangel	Ferroviária	Undisclosed	
1 September 2020	GK	(Brazil)	Matheus Albino	Londrina	Undisclosed	
5 September 2020	DF	(Greece)	Dimitrios Chantakias	Cherno More	Undisclosed	
5 October 2020	MF	(Azerbaijan)	Gismat Aliyev	Gabala	Undisclosed	
26 October 2020	MF	(Azerbaijan)	Richard Almeida	Baniyas	Free	
19 January 2021	DF	(Serbia)	Nemanja Anđelković	Zlatibor Čajetina	Undisclosed	
6 March 2021	FW	(Cameroon)	Rodrigue Bongongui	Hapoel Hadera	Free	
7 March 2021	FW	(Argentina)	Facundo Melivilo	San Martín	Free	

=== Loans in ===
Date from	Position	Nationality	Name	From	Date to	Ref.
1 August 2020	MF	(Azerbaijan)	Hajiagha Hajili	Qarabağ	End of season	
2 January 2021	FW	(Azerbaijan)	Musa Gurbanli	Qarabağ	End of season	
30 January 2021	FW	(Brazil)	Filipe Pachtmann	Lviv	End of season	

=== Out ===
Date	Position	Nationality	Name	To	Fee	Ref.
10 July 2020	GK	(Azerbaijan)	Emil Balayev	Qarabağ	Undisclosed	

=== Released ===
Date	Position	Nationality	Name	Joined	Date	Ref.
13 July 2020	GK	(Azerbaijan)	Orkhan Sadigli			
13 July 2020	DF	(Montenegro)	Miloš Bakrač	Iskra Danilovgrad	27 January 2021	
13 July 2020	DF	(Serbia)	Jovan Krneta	Inđija		
13 July 2020	GK	(Montenegro)	Bojan Zogović	Vllaznia Shkodër		
13 July 2020	MF	(Azerbaijan)	Javid Huseynov	Gabala		
13 July 2020	MF	(Azerbaijan)	Tellur Mutallimov	Sumgayit	17 July 2020	
13 July 2020	MF	(France)	Chafik Tigroudja	USP Grand Avignon		
15 July 2020	DF	(Romania)	Adrian Scarlatache	Hermannstadt	16 August 2020	
16 July 2020	DF	(Azerbaijan)	Bakhtiyar Hasanalizade	Sabah	24 December 2020	
16 July 2020	MF	(Botswana)	Mpho Kgaswane	Cape Town Spurs	11 January 2021	
16 July 2020	FW	(Ghana)	Richard Gadze	Sheriff Tiraspol	7 August 2020	
17 September 2020	MF	(Moldova)	Gheorghe Anton	Gloria Buzău		
16 December 2020	FW	(Brazil)	Caio Rangel	Santo André	3 March 2021	
21 December 2020	MF	(Azerbaijan)	Rashad Eyyubov			
29 January 2021	DF	(Sierra Leone)	Alie Sesay	Sabail	31 January 2021	
24 May 2021	DF	(Azerbaijan)	Karim Diniyev	Keşla		
24 May 2021	DF	(Serbia)	Lazar Đorđević	Al Khalidiya		
24 May 2021	MF	(Azerbaijan)	Tural Bayramli	Pierikos		
24 May 2021	FW	(Mozambique)	Clésio	Marítimo		
24 May 2021	FW	(Azerbaijan)	Ruslan Gurbanov	Slavia Mozyr		
27 May 2021	GK	(Brazil)	Matheus Albino	Londrina	21 January 2022	
27 May 2021	MF	(Azerbaijan)	Elvin Jamalov	Sabah	27 May 2021	
27 May 2021	FW	(Cameroon)	Rodrigue Bongongui	Tabor Sežana	5 August 2021	

== Friendlies ==
10 January 2021	Sumgayit	3 – 2	Zira	Baku
AZT (UTC+4)	Imamverdiyev 7', 37'; Hüseynov 50'	Report	Volkovi 34'; Gurbanli 90+3'	Stadium: Dalga Arena

== Competitions ==
=== Premier League ===
==== Results summary ====
Overall								Home						Away					
Pld	W	D	L	GF	GA	GD	Pts	W	D	L	GF	GA	GD	W	D	L	GF	GA	GD
28	8	14	6	28	28	0	38	5	7	2	13	9	+4	3	7	4	15	19	−4

Last updated: 19 May 2021.
Source: See Results

==== Results by round ====
Round	1	2	3	4	5	6	7	8	9	10	11	12	13	14	15	16	17	18	19	20	21	22	23	24	25	26	27	28
Ground	A	A	H	A	H	A	H	H	A	H	A	H	A	H	H	A	H	A	H	A	A	H	A	H	A	H	H	A
Result	D	W	L	W	W	L	D	D	W	W	D	D	L	W	D	D	W	D	L	D	D	D	L	D	D	D	W	L
Position	4	2	6	2	1	3	3	3	3	2	2	3	3	3	3	3	3	3	3	3	3	3	4	4	3	4	3	4

Updated to match(es) played on 19 May 2021. Source: See Results
A = Away; H = Home; W = Win; D = Draw; L = Loss

==== Results ====
23 August 2020 1	Gabala	1 – 1	Zira	Qabala
19:00 AZT (UTC+4)	Mammadov 3' (yellow card) 11'; Goxha (yellow card) 13'; Gattas (yellow card) 84'	Report	Hajili (yellow card) 14' (yellow-red card) 90+1'; Đorđević (yellow card) 18'; Ramazanov 28'; Rahimov (yellow card) 45+1'	Stadium: Gabala City Stadium; Attendance: 0 Referee: Kamal Umudlu
Note: Match played behind closed doors due to the COVID-19 pandemic.

12 September 2020 2	Sabail	1 – 2	Zira	Baku
19:00 AZT (UTC+4)	Amirguliyev (yellow card) 24'; Isayev (yellow card) 38'; Haziyev (yellow card) 44'; U.Abbasov 81' (pen.)	Report	Bayramli (yellow card) 24'; Rahimov (yellow card) 45'; Volkovi 47'; Jamalov (yellow card) 50'; Gurbanov 67' (pen.); Đorđević (yellow card) 78'	Stadium: Bayil Arena; Attendance: 0 Referee: Vugar Hasanli
Note: Match played behind closed doors due to the COVID-19 pandemic.

20 September 2020 3	Zira	0 – 2	Sabah	Zirə
18:00 AZT (UTC+4)	Jamalov (yellow card) 24'; Clésio (yellow card) 85'; Muradov (yellow card) 90+4'	Report	Rodríguez (yellow card) 22' (goal) 51'; Mirzabeyov (yellow card) 60'; Nuriyev (yellow card) 85'; Khalilzade (yellow card) 89'; Koubemba 90+2'	Stadium: Zira Olympic Sport Complex Stadium; Attendance: 0 Referee: Ingilab Mammadov
Note: Match played behind closed doors due to the COVID-19 pandemic.

26 September 2020 4	Keşla	2 – 3	Zira	Baku
20:15 AZT (UTC+4)	Sílvio 10'; Klyots 55'; Aliyev (yellow card) 76'; Qirtimov (yellow card) 90+2'; Artur (yellow card) 90+2'	Report	Clésio 21', 69'; Đorđević (yellow card) 23'; Rahimov (yellow card) 74'; Volkovi 80' (pen.); Chantakias (yellow card) 90+2'; Sesay (yellow card) 90+3'	Stadium: ASK Arena; Attendance: 0 Referee: Ravan Hamzazada
Note: Match played behind closed doors due to the COVID-19 pandemic.

3 October 2020 5	Zira	1 – 0	Neftçi	Zirə
16:00 AZT (UTC+4)	Chantakias (yellow card) 16'; Bayramli (yellow card) 85'; Volkovi 90+5'; Ramazanov (yellow card) 90+5'; Shirinov (yellow card) 90+5'	Report	Thallyson (yellow card) 69'	Stadium: Zira Olympic Sport Complex Stadium; Attendance: 0 Referee: Elcin Masiyev
Note: Match played behind closed doors due to the COVID-19 pandemic.

17 October 2020 6	Sumgayit	2 – 1	Zira	Sumqayit
16:00 AZT (UTC+4)	Mustafayev (yellow card) 18'; Sadikhov 30' (pen.); Badalov (yellow card) 43'; Khodzhaniyazov (yellow card) 45'; Mutallimov 59'; Turabov (yellow card) 83'; Bayramov (yellow card) 90+1'	Report	Rahimov (yellow card) 30'; Volkovi 35'; Diniyev (red card) 90+3'	Stadium: Kapital Bank Arena; Attendance: 0 Referee: Rahim Hasanov
Note: Match played behind closed doors due to the COVID-19 pandemic.

25 October 2020 7	Zira	0 – 0	Qarabağ	Zirə
16:00 AZT (UTC+4)	Volkovi (yellow card) 45+3'; Aliyev (yellow card) 80'	Report	Mammadov (yellow card) 35' (yellow-red card) 68'; Jafarguliyev (yellow card) 89'	Stadium: Zira Olympic Sport Complex Stadium; Attendance: 0 Referee: Ravan Hamzazada
Note: Match played behind closed doors due to the COVID-19 pandemic.

31 October 2020 8	Zira	0 – 0	Sabail	Zirə
16:00 AZT (UTC+4)		Report	U.Abbasov (yellow card) 7'; Kadriu (yellow card) 42'; Beybalayev (yellow card) 74'	Stadium: Zira Olympic Sport Complex Stadium; Attendance: 0 Referee: Orkhan Mammadov
Note: Match played behind closed doors due to the COVID-19 pandemic.

8 November 2020 9	Sabah	0 – 1	Zira	Masazır
17:00 AZT (UTC+4)	Marina (yellow card) 15'; Kökçü (yellow card) 45'; Diniyev (yellow card) 45+3'; Seydiyev (yellow card) 56'	Report	Matheus Albino (yellow card) 41' (yellow-red card) 90'; Ramazanov 58'; Richard (yellow card) 73'; Muradov (yellow card) 73'	Stadium: Bank Respublika Arena; Attendance: 0 Referee: Rauf Jabbarov
Note: Match played behind closed doors due to the COVID-19 pandemic.

22 November 2020 10	Zira	3 – 1	Keşla	Zirə
16:00 AZT (UTC+4)	Chantakias 33'; Tashkin (yellow card) 34'; Hajili (yellow card) 42'; Ramazanov 60'; Jamalov (yellow card) 79'; Đorđević (yellow card) 83'; Clésio 90+5'	Report	Azadov (yellow card) 5'; Kamara (yellow card) 28'; Valizade (yellow card) 61'; Clésio 73' (o.g.)	Stadium: Zira Olympic Sport Complex Stadium; Attendance: 0 Referee: Aliyar Agayev
Note: Match played behind closed doors due to the COVID-19 pandemic.

28 November 2020 11	Neftçi	0 – 0	Zira	Baku
16:00 AZT (UTC+4)	Bougrine (yellow card) 85'	Report	Jamalov (yellow card) 89'	Stadium: Eighth Kilometer District Stadium; Attendance: 0 Referee: Vugar Hasanli

20 December 2020 12	Zira	2 – 2	Sumgayit	Zirə
16:00 AZT (UTC+4)	Ramazanov 56'; Aliyev 62'; Hajili (yellow card) 63'	Report	Badalov (yellow card) 5'; Khachayev 11' (yellow card) 55'; Sadikhov 57'; Mustafayev (yellow card) 89'	Stadium: Zira Olympic Sport Complex Stadium; Attendance: 0 Referee: Raad Ahmadov
Note: Match originally scheduled for 5 December, but postponed. Match played behind closed doors due to the COVID-19 pandemic.

24 December 2020 13	Qarabağ	3 – 2	Zira	Baku
16:00 AZT (UTC+4)	Zoubir (yellow card) 43'; Emreli 58'; Ibrahimli (yellow card) 80'; Kwabena 83', 89'; Mahammadaliyev (yellow card) 90+2'; Medina (red card) 90+2'	Report	Ramazanov 2' (yellow card) 60'; Đorđević 47' (yellow card) 47'; Chantakias (yellow card) 70' (yellow-red card) 75'	Stadium: Azersun Arena; Attendance: 0 Referee: Rahim Hasanov
Note: Match played behind closed doors due to the COVID-19 pandemic.

21 January 2021 14	Zira	2 – 0	Gabala	Zirə
16:00 AZT (UTC+4)	Volkovi (yellow card) 21' (goal) 90+4'; Aliyev (yellow card) 38'; Gurbanli 45+1'; Jamalov (yellow card) 60'; Richard (yellow card) 69'	Report	Utzig (yellow card) 17'; J.Huseynov (yellow card) 73'; Međimorec (yellow card) 85'; Gigauri (yellow card) 90+4'	Stadium: Zira Olympic Sport Complex Stadium; Attendance: 0 Referee: Orkhan Mammadov
Note: Match played behind closed doors due to the COVID-19 pandemic.

14 February 2021 15	Zira	2 – 2	Sabah	Zirə
17:00 AZT (UTC+4)	Chantakias (yellow card) 56'; Volkovi 79'; Clésio 90+2'	Report	Koubemba 9', 83'; Ivanović (yellow card) 47'; Alkhasov (yellow card) 49'; Fofana (yellow card) 63'; S.Seyidov (yellow card) 79'	Stadium: Zira Olympic Sport Complex Stadium; Attendance: 0 Referee: Kamal Umudlu
Note: Match played behind closed doors due to the COVID-19 pandemic.

20 February 2021 16	Keşla	2 – 2	Zira	Baku
16:00 AZT (UTC+4)	Gurbanov 19'; Tounkara 21'; Meza (yellow card) 24'; Sílvio (yellow card) 78'	Report	Clésio 17'; Jamalov (yellow card) 33'; Chantakias (red card) 61'; Volkovi 73'	Stadium: ASK Arena; Attendance: 0 Referee: Elcin Mesiyev
Note: Match played behind closed doors due to the COVID-19 pandemic.

25 February 2021 17	Zira	1 – 0	Neftçi	Zirə
16:00 AZT (UTC+4)	Volkovi 67'	Report	M.Kane (yellow card) 9'; Mbodj (yellow card) 72'; Thallyson (yellow card) 77'; Krivotsyuk (yellow card) 88'	Stadium: Zira Olympic Sport Complex Stadium; Attendance: 0 Referee: Aliyar Agayev
Note: Match played behind closed doors due to the COVID-19 pandemic.

3 March 2021 18	Sumgayit	0 – 0	Zira	Sumqayit
16:00 AZT (UTC+4)	Ghorbani (yellow card) 13'; Mutallimov (yellow card) 61'	Report	Richard (yellow card) 27'; Hajili (yellow card) 60'; Aliyev (yellow card) 79'	Stadium: Kapital Bank Arena; Attendance: 0 Referee: Ingilab Mammadov
Note: Match played behind closed doors due to the COVID-19 pandemic.

9 March 2021 19	Zira	0 – 2	Qarabağ	Zirə
17:15 AZT (UTC+4)	Jamalov (yellow card) 55'; Clésio (yellow card) 73'	Report	Romero 3'; Andrade 32'; Jafarguliyev (yellow card) 67'	Stadium: Zira Olympic Sport Complex Stadium; Attendance: 0 Referee: Elcin Masiyev
Note: Match played behind closed doors due to the COVID-19 pandemic.

14 March 2021 20	Gabala	1 – 1	Zira	Qabala
15:00 AZT (UTC+4)	Međimorec 23'; Gigauri (red card) 29'; Goxha (yellow card) 67'; Rajsel (yellow card) 87'; J.Huseynov (yellow card) 87'	Report	Ramazanov (yellow card) 60'; Richard (yellow card) 72'; Chantakias (yellow card) 90+1'; Melivilo 90+3'; Muradov (yellow card) 90+4'	Stadium: Gabala City Stadium; Attendance: 0 Referee: Vugar Hasanli
Note: Match played behind closed doors due to the COVID-19 pandemic.

3 April 2021 21	Sabail	0 – 0	Zira	Baku
17:30 AZT (UTC+4)		Report	Huseynov (yellow card) 60'; Aliyev (yellow card) 60'; Muradov (yellow card) 85'; Hajili; (yellow card) 87'; N.Andjelkovic (yellow card) 90+4'	Stadium: Bayil Arena; Attendance: 0 Referee: Elchin Masiyev
Note: Match played behind closed doors due to the COVID-19 pandemic.

11 April 2021 22	Zira	0 – 0	Keşla	Zirə
17:00 AZT (UTC+4)	Ramazanov (yellow card) 38'; Bongongui (yellow card) 60'; Aliyev (yellow card) 70'; Tashkin (yellow card) 81'	Report	Aliyev (yellow card) 51'; Valizade (yellow card) 53'; Abang (yellow card) 61'	Stadium: Zira Olympic Sport Complex Stadium; Attendance: 0 Referee: Raad Ahmadov
Note: Match played behind closed doors due to the COVID-19 pandemic.

17 April 2021 23	Neftçi	4 – 0	Zira	Baku
20:15 AZT (UTC+4)	Lawal (yellow card) 31'; Alaskarov 47', 77'; Honda (yellow card) 71'; Abbasov 74'; Joseph-Monrose 90+2'	Report		Stadium: Eighth Kilometer District Stadium; Attendance: 0 Referee: Rauf Jabbarov
Note: Match played behind closed doors due to the COVID-19 pandemic.

25 April 2021 24	Zira	0 – 0	Sumgayit	Zirə
20:00 AZT (UTC+4)	Richard (yellow card) 26'; Chantakias (yellow card) 44'; Hajili (yellow card) 52'	Report	Badalov (yellow card) 2'; Haghverdi (yellow card) 47'; Ahmadov (yellow card) 55'; Mutallimov (yellow card) 76'; Mammadov (yellow card) 76'	Stadium: Zira Olympic Sport Complex Stadium; Attendance: 0 Referee: Ingilab Mammadov
Note: Match played behind closed doors due to the COVID-19 pandemic.

4 May 2021 25	Qarabağ	1 – 1	Zira	Baku
18:00 AZT (UTC+4)	Bayramov (yellow card) 12'; Zoubir 18'; Medina (yellow card) 82'	Report	Melivilo 16'	Stadium: Azersun Arena; Attendance: 0 Referee: Raad Ahmadov
Note: Match played behind closed doors due to the COVID-19 pandemic.

9 May 2021 26	Zira	0 – 0	Gabala	Zirə
18:00 AZT (UTC+4)	Volkovi (yellow card) 20'; Hajili (yellow card) 67'	Report	Mammadov (yellow card) 70'	Stadium: Zira Olympic Sport Complex Stadium; Attendance: 0 Referee: Aliyar Agayev
Note: Match played behind closed doors due to the COVID-19 pandemic.

14 May 2021 27	Zira	2 – 0	Keşla	Zirə
19:00 AZT (UTC+4)	Richard (yellow card) 4'; Ramazanov 58'; Andjelkovic 64'	Report	Abbasov (yellow card) 49'; Naghiyev (yellow card) 79'	Stadium: Zira Olympic Sport Complex Stadium; Attendance: 0 Referee: Ingilab Mammadov
Note: Match played behind closed doors due to the COVID-19 pandemic.

19 May 2021 28	Sabah	2 – 1	{{{team2}}}	Masazır
18:00 AZT (UTC+4)	Sheydayev 21'; Marina (yellow card) 71'; Ivanović (yellow card) 78'; Alkhasov (yellow card) 87'; Rodríguez 89'; Ochihava (yellow card) 90+5'	Report	Hajili (yellow card) 41'; Ramazanov (yellow card) 77'; Aliyev 78' (pen.)	Stadium: Bank Respublika Arena; Attendance: 0 Referee: Aliyar Agayev
Note: Match played behind closed doors due to the COVID-19 pandemic.

==== League table ====
Pos	Team	Pld	W	D	L	GF	GA	GD	Pts	Qualification
2	Qarabağ	28	16	9	3	64	18	+46	57	Qualification to Europa Conference League second qualifying round
3	Sumgayit	28	10	9	9	30	31	−1	39	Qualification to Europa Conference League second qualifying round
4	Zira	28	8	14	6	28	28	0	38	
5	Sabah	28	7	8	13	28	38	−10	29	
6	Keşla	28	5	11	12	25	40	−15	26	Qualification to Europa Conference League second qualifying round

Source: Soccerway
Rules for classification: 1) Points; 2) Head-to-head points; 3) Head-to-head goal difference; 4) Head-to-head goals scored; 5) Head-to-head away goals scored (only if two teams); 6) Goal difference; 7) Goals scored.

=== Azerbaijan Cup ===
25 January 2021 Last 16	Qaradağ Lökbatan	0 – 4	Zira	Lökbatan
16:00 AZT (UTC+4)	E.Samadov (yellow card) 26'; Jafarov (yellow card) 37'; K.Hüseynov (yellow card) 81'	Report	Andjelkovic 12'; Volkovi 27', 45+1'; Gurbanli 30'	Stadium: Lökbatan Olympic Sport Complex Stadium; Attendance: 0 Referee: Nicat İsmayıllı
Note: Match played behind closed doors due to the COVID-19 pandemic in Azerbaijan.

2 February 2021 Quarterfinal 1st leg	Neftçi	0 – 1	Zira	Baku
18:00 AZT (UTC+4)	M.Kane (yellow card) 60'; Bougrine (yellow card) 90+5'	Report	Muradov 26'; Hajili (yellow card) 44'; Chantakias (yellow card) 90'	Stadium: Eighth Kilometer District Stadium; Attendance: 0 Referee: Raad Ahmadov
Note: Match played behind closed doors due to the COVID-19 pandemic in Azerbaijan.

7 February 2021 Quarterfinal 2nd leg	Zira	0 – 0 (1 – 0 agg.)	Neftçi	Zirə
17:30 AZT (UTC+4)	Richard (yellow card) 15'; Jamalov (yellow card) 24'; Volkovi (yellow card) 41'; Clésio (yellow card) 67'	Report	Mahmudov (yellow card) 28'; Krivotsyuk (yellow card) 80'; Stanković (yellow card) 85'	Stadium: Zira Olympic Sport Complex Stadium; Attendance: 0 Referee: Ingilab Mammadov
Note: Match played behind closed doors due to the COVID-19 pandemic in Azerbaijan.

21 April 2021 Semifinal 1st leg	Keşla	1 – 2	Zira	Baku
18:30 AZT (UTC+4)	Kamara (yellow card) 33'; Hajiyev (yellow card) 45'; Tounkara 45+1'; Aliyev (yellow card) 90+4'	Report	Ramazanov (yellow card) 17'; Bongongui 57'; Andjelkovic 62'; Richard (yellow card) 72'; Muradov (yellow card) 90+1'	Stadium: ASK Arena; Attendance: 0 Referee: Kamal Umudlu
Note: Match played behind closed doors due to the COVID-19 pandemic in Azerbaijan.

29 April 2021 Semifinal 2nd leg	Zira	2 – 3 (4 – 4 (a) agg.)	Keşla	Zirə
20:00 AZT (UTC+4)	Muradov (yellow card) 26'; Aliyev 48' (o.g.); Hajili (yellow card) 84'; Đorđević (red card) 88'; Andjelkovic (yellow card) 90'; Clésio 92'; Azizli (yellow card) 96'; Bayramli (yellow card) 102'; Tashkin (red card) 120'	Report	Isgandarli (yellow card) 10'; Valizade (yellow card) 61'; Meza 67', 90+1' (pen.), 93'; Guliyev (yellow card) 79'; Bayramov (yellow card) 93'; Sílvio (yellow card) 110'	Stadium: Zira Olympic Sport Complex Stadium; Attendance: 0 Referee: Elcin Masiyev
Note: Match played behind closed doors due to the COVID-19 pandemic in Azerbaijan.

== Squad statistics ==
As of match played 19 May 2021

=== Appearances and goals ===
No.	Pos	Nat	Player	Total		Premier League		Azerbaijan Cup	
No.	Pos	Nat	Player	Apps	Goals	Apps	Goals	Apps	Goals
1	GK	(Brazil) BRA	Matheus Albino	30	0	26	0	4	0
2	DF	(Azerbaijan) AZE	Sertan Tashkin	28	0	22+2	0	3+1	0
4	MF	(Azerbaijan) AZE	Elvin Jamalov	29	0	21+4	0	3+1	0
5	DF	(Azerbaijan) AZE	Karim Diniyev	3	0	0+2	0	1	0
6	DF	(Azerbaijan) AZE	Ayxan Süleymanlı	1	0	0	0	0+1	0
7	MF	(Azerbaijan) AZE	Tural Bayramli	19	0	7+9	0	1+2	0
8	MF	(Azerbaijan) AZE	Ilkin Muradov	32	1	23+4	0	4+1	1
9	FW	(Georgia (country)) GEO	Davit Volkovi	29	10	21+3	8	4+1	2
10	FW	(Azerbaijan) AZE	Aghabala Ramazanov	24	6	20+2	6	2	0
11	FW	(Mozambique) MOZ	Clésio	32	6	25+3	5	3+1	1
12	DF	(Serbia) SRB	Lazar Đorđević	21	1	16+2	1	1+2	0
13	DF	(Azerbaijan) AZE	Shahriyar Rahimov	10	0	6+3	0	1	0
14	FW	(Argentina) ARG	Facundo Melivilo	4	2	2+2	2	0	0
17	FW	(Cameroon) CMR	Rodrigue Bongongui	12	1	5+5	0	2	1
20	MF	(Azerbaijan) AZE	Ali Shirinov	3	0	0+2	0	0+1	0
21	MF	(Azerbaijan) AZE	Hajiagha Hajili	29	0	19+5	0	5	0
22	GK	(Azerbaijan) AZE	Rashad Azizli	3	0	2	0	1	0
26	DF	(Serbia) SRB	Nemanja Anđelković	19	3	14	1	5	2
27	MF	(Azerbaijan) AZE	Tamerlan Burcəliyev	1	0	0	0	0+1	0
29	FW	(Azerbaijan) AZE	Musa Gurbanli	11	2	3+6	1	2	1
30	MF	(Azerbaijan) AZE	Richard Almeida	23	0	19+1	0	3	0
32	MF	(Azerbaijan) AZE	Gismat Aliyev	26	2	22	2	4	0
44	DF	(Greece) GRE	Dimitrios Chantakias	28	1	22+1	1	5	0
77	DF	(Azerbaijan) AZE	Jalal Huseynov	10	0	5+4	0	0+1	0
91	FW	(Azerbaijan) AZE	Ruslan Gurbanov	16	1	4+11	1	1	0
99	FW	(Brazil) BRA	Filipe Pachtmann	3	0	0+1	0	0+2	0
Players away from Zira on loan:
Players who left Zira during the season:
3	DF	(Sierra Leone) SLE	Alie Sesay	3	0	2+1	0	0	0
14	MF	(Azerbaijan) AZE	Rashad Eyyubov	3	0	1+2	0	0	0
17	FW	(Brazil) BRA	Caio Rangel	3	0	1+2	0	0	0

=== Goal scorers ===
Place	Position	Nation	Number	Name	Premier League	Azerbaijan Cup	Total
1	FW	(Georgia (country))	9	Davit Volkovi	8	2	10
2	FW	(Azerbaijan)	10	Aghabala Ramazanov	6	0	6
2	FW	(Mozambique)	11	Clésio	5	1	6
4	DF	(Serbia)	26	Nemanja Anđelković	1	2	3
5	FW	(Argentina)	14	Facundo Melivilo	2	0	2
5	MF	(Azerbaijan)	32	Gismat Aliyev	2	0	2
5	FW	(Azerbaijan)	29	Musa Gurbanli	1	1	2
8	FW	(Azerbaijan)	91	Ruslan Gurbanov	1	0	1
8	DF	(Greece)	44	Dimitrios Chantakias	1	0	1
8	DF	(Serbia)	12	Lazar Đorđević	1	0	1
8	MF	(Azerbaijan)	8	Ilkin Muradov	0	1	1
8	FW	(Cameroon)	17	Rodrigue Bongongui	0	1	1
8				Own goal	0	1	1
				TOTALS	28	9	37

=== Clean sheets ===
Place	Position	Nation	Number	Name	Premier League	Azerbaijan Cup	Total
1	GK	(Brazil)	1	Matheus Albino	13	2	15
2	GK	(Azerbaijan)	22	Rashad Azizli	0	1	1
				TOTALS	13	3	16

=== Disciplinary record ===
Number	Nation	Position	Name	Premier League		Azerbaijan Cup		Total	
Number	Nation	Position	Name	Booked	Sent off (straight red)	Booked	Sent off (straight red)	Booked	Sent off (straight red)
1	(Brazil)	GK	Matheus Albino	2	1	0	0	2	1
2	(Azerbaijan)	DF	Sertan Tashkin	2	0	0	1	2	1
4	(Azerbaijan)	MF	Elvin Jamalov	7	0	1	0	8	0
5	(Azerbaijan)	DF	Karim Diniyev	0	1	0	0	0	1
7	(Azerbaijan)	MF	Tural Bayramli	2	0	1	0	3	0
8	(Azerbaijan)	MF	Ilkin Muradov	4	0	2	0	6	0
9	(Georgia (country))	FW	Davit Volkovi	3	0	1	0	4	0
10	(Azerbaijan)	FW	Aghabala Ramazanov	5	0	1	0	6	0
11	(Mozambique)	FW	Clésio	2	0	1	0	3	0
12	(Serbia)	DF	Lazar Đorđević	5	0	0	1	5	1
13	(Azerbaijan)	DF	Shahriyar Rahimov	4	0	0	0	4	0
17	(Azerbaijan)	MF	Ali Shirinov	1	0	0	0	1	0
20	(Azerbaijan)	MF	Ali Shirinov	1	0	0	0	1	0
21	(Azerbaijan)	MF	Hajiagha Hajili	9	1	2	0	11	1
22	(Azerbaijan)	GK	Rashad Azizli	0	0	1	0	1	0
26	(Serbia)	DF	Nemanja Anđelković	1	0	1	0	2	0
30	(Azerbaijan)	MF	Richard Almeida	6	0	2	0	8	0
32	(Azerbaijan)	MF	Gismat Aliyev	5	0	0	0	5	0
44	(Greece)	DF	Dimitrios Chantakias	7	2	1	0	8	2
77	(Azerbaijan)	DF	Jalal Huseynov	1	0	0	0	1	0
Players who left Zira during the season:
3	(Sierra Leone)	DF	Alie Sesay	1	0	0	0	1	0
			TOTALS	64	5	14	2	78	7
