= 2020–21 Azerbaijan Cup =

Tournament details
- Country: Azerbaijan
- Teams: 12

Final positions
- Champions: Keşla
- Runners-up: Sumgayit

Tournament statistics
- Matches played: 17
- Goals scored: 40 (2.35 per match)
- Top goal scorer: César Meza (4)

The 2020–21 Azerbaijan Cup is the 29th season of the annual cup competition in Azerbaijan, with Premier League side Gabala being the defending champions from the 2018–19 season after the 2019–20 completion was cancelled due to the COVID-19 pandemic in Azerbaijan.

== Teams ==
Round	Clubs remaining	Clubs involved	Winners from previous round	New entries this round	Leagues entering at this round
First round	8	8	0	8	4 Premier League teams 4 First Division teams
Quarter-finals	8	4	4	4	4 Premier League teams
Semi-finals	4	4	4	none	none
Final	2	2	2	none	none

== Round and draw dates ==
Round	Draw date	First match date	Ref.
First round	24 November 2020	24 January 2021	
Quarter-finals	24 November 2020	1-2 & 6–7 February 2021	
Semi-finals	24 November 2020	21 & 29 April 2021	
Final	24 November 2020	28 May 2021	

== First round ==
24 January 2021 Match 1	Sabail (1)	3 – 2	(2) Zagatala	Baku
15:00 AZT (UTC+4)	P.Keshavarz (yellow card) 3'; Yunanov 26'; Naghiyev 62'; Beybalayev (yellow card) 80'; A.Ismayilov 84'	Report	R.Ismayilov 31', 40' (yellow card) 78'; V.Şabanov (yellow card) 75'; R.Nuruyev (yellow card) 80'	Stadium: Bayil Arena; Attendance: 0 Referee: Namiq Bakirov
Note: Match played behind closed doors due to the COVID-19 pandemic in Azerbaijan.

25 January 2021 Match 2	Turan-Tovuz (2)	0 – 2	(1) Gabala	Tovuz
14:00 AZT (UTC+4)	N.Sabanov (yellow card) 41'; E.Taghiyev (yellow card) 45+3'; V.Jafarov (yellow card) 75'	Report	Vukčević 32'; Adeniyi 45+2'	Stadium: Tovuz City Stadium; Attendance: 0 Referee: Rauf Allahverdiyev
Note: Match played behind closed doors due to the COVID-19 pandemic in Azerbaijan.

25 January 2021 Match 3	Sabah (1)	1 – 2	(2) Kapaz	Masazır
17:00 AZT (UTC+4)	Ivanović 45+1'	Report	U.Samadov (yellow card) 3'; Nod.Mammadov (yellow card) 42'; Qurbanov 68'; Samadov 84'	Stadium: Bank Respublika Arena; Attendance: 0 Referee: Farid Haciyev
Note: Match played behind closed doors due to the COVID-19 pandemic in Azerbaijan.

25 January 2021 Match 4	Qaradağ Lökbatan (2)	0 – 4	(1) Zira	Lökbatan
16:00 AZT (UTC+4)	E.Samadov (yellow card) 26'; Jafarov (yellow card) 37'; K.Hüseynov (yellow card) 81'	Report	Anđelković 12'; Volkovi 27', 45+1'; Gurbanli 30'	Stadium: Lökbatan Olympic Sport Complex Stadium; Attendance: 0 Referee: Nicat İsmayıllı
Note: Match played behind closed doors due to the COVID-19 pandemic in Azerbaijan.

== Quarterfinals ==
1 February 2021 Match 5 1st leg	Sumgayit (1)	0 – 1	(1) Sabail	Sumqayit
16:00 AZT (UTC+4)	Khodzhaniyazov (yellow card) 17'; Najafov (yellow card) 23'	Report	Garahmadov (yellow card) 8'; Yunanov 12'; Imnadze (yellow card) 45+2'	Stadium: Kapital Bank Arena; Attendance: 0 Referee: Rauf Jabbarov
Note: Match played behind closed doors due to the COVID-19 pandemic in Azerbaijan.

6 February 2021 Match 5 2nd leg	Sabail (1)	1 – 2 (2 – 2 (a) agg.)	(1) Sumgayit	Baku
18:00 AZT (UTC+4)	P.Keshavarzi (yellow card) 56'; Aliyev (yellow card) 90+5'; Ismayilov 90+6' (pen.)	Report	Sadikhov 20' (pen.); Ghorbani 23' (yellow card) 36'; Khodzhaniyazov (yellow card) 57'; Mustafayev (yellow card) 85'; Jannatov (yellow card) 90+1'	Stadium: Bayil Arena; Attendance: 0 Referee: Orkhan Mammadov
Note: Match played behind closed doors due to the COVID-19 pandemic in Azerbaijan.

1 February 2021 Match 6 1st leg	Qarabağ (1)	3 – 1	(1) Gabala	Baku
18:00 AZT (UTC+4)	Matić (penalty missed) 33'; Kwabena 55'; Emreli 72', 75'; Bayramov (yellow card) 78'	Report	Vukčević (yellow card) 31'; Goxha (yellow card) 33'; Adeniyi 88'	Stadium: Tofiq Bahramov Republican Stadium; Attendance: 0 Referee: Ravan Hamzazada
Note: Match played behind closed doors due to the COVID-19 pandemic in Azerbaijan.

6 February 2021 Match 6 2nd leg	Gabala (1)	0 – 3 (1 – 6 agg.)	(1) Qarabağ	Qabala
15:00 AZT (UTC+4)	Gigauri (yellow card) 68'; Mammadov (yellow card) 85'	Report	Medvedev 6'; B.Huseynov (yellow card) 30'; A.Huseynov (yellow card) 32'; Andrade 45+4' (pen.), 48'	Stadium: Gabala City Stadium; Attendance: 0 Referee: Aliyar Agayev
Note: Match played behind closed doors due to the COVID-19 pandemic in Azerbaijan.

2 February 2021 Match 7 1st leg	Keşla (1)	1 – 0	(2) Kapaz	Baku
16:00 AZT (UTC+4)	Meza 43' (pen.); Isgandarli (yellow card) 65'	Report	A.Samadov (yellow card) 36'; U.Samadov (yellow card) 42'; R.Suleymanov (yellow card) 45'; G.Aliyev (yellow card) 50'	Stadium: ASK Arena; Attendance: 0 Referee: Rahim Hasanov
Note: Match played behind closed doors due to the COVID-19 pandemic in Azerbaijan.

7 February 2021 Match 7 2nd leg	Kapaz (2)	0 – 2 (0 – 3 agg.)	(1) Keşla	Ganja
14:30 AZT (UTC+4)		Report	Bojović (yellow card) 27'; Maharramli (yellow card) 44'; Kamara (yellow card) 55'; Hajiyev 59'; Meza (yellow card) 68'; Abang (yellow card) 85' (goal) 90'	Stadium: Ganja City Stadium; Attendance: 0 Referee: Elcin Masiyev
Note: Match played behind closed doors due to the COVID-19 pandemic in Azerbaijan.

2 February 2021 Match 8 1st leg	Neftçi (1)	0 – 1	(1) Zira	Baku
18:00 AZT (UTC+4)	M.Kane (yellow card) 60'; Bougrine (yellow card) 90+5'	Report	Muradov 26'; Hajili (yellow card) 44'; Chantakias (yellow card) 90'	Stadium: Eighth Kilometer District Stadium; Attendance: 0 Referee: Raad Ahmadov
Note: Match played behind closed doors due to the COVID-19 pandemic in Azerbaijan.

7 February 2021 Match 7 2nd leg	Zira (1)	0 – 0 (1 – 0 agg.)	(1) Neftçi	Zirə
17:30 AZT (UTC+4)	Richard (yellow card) 15'; Jamalov (yellow card) 24'; Volkovi (yellow card) 41'; Clésio (yellow card) 67'	Report	Mahmudov (yellow card) 28'; Krivotsyuk (yellow card) 80'; Stanković (yellow card) 85'	Stadium: Zira Olympic Sport Complex Stadium; Attendance: 0 Referee: Ingilab Mammadov
Note: Match played behind closed doors due to the COVID-19 pandemic in Azerbaijan.

== Semifinals ==
21 April 2021 Match 9 1st leg	Sumgayit (1)	0 – 0	(1) Qarabağ	Sumqayit
20:30 AZT (UTC+4)		Report	Ibrahimli (yellow card) 45'	Stadium: Kapital Bank Arena; Attendance: 0 Referee: Raad Ahmadov
Note: Match played behind closed doors due to the COVID-19 pandemic in Azerbaijan.

29 April 2021 Match 9 1st leg	Qarabağ (1)	0 – 0 (0 – 0 agg.) (4 – 5 p)	(1) Sumgayit	Baku
17:00 AZT (UTC+4)	B.Huseynov (yellow card) 88'; Mahammadaliyev (yellow card) 115'	Report	Haghverdi (yellow card) 60'	Stadium: Tofiq Bahramov Republican Stadium; Attendance: 0 Referee: Aliyar Agayev
	Penalties
	Medvedev (penalty scored); Bayramov (penalty scored); Garayev (penalty scored); Romero (penalty scored); Andrade (penalty missed); Medina (penalty missed)		Khodzhaniyazov (penalty scored); Mammadov (penalty missed); Hüseynov (penalty scored); Najafov (penalty scored); Haghverdi (penalty scored); Mustafayev (penalty scored)
Note: Match played behind closed doors due to the COVID-19 pandemic in Azerbaijan.

21 April 2021 Match 10 1st leg	Keşla (1)	1 – 2	(1) Zira	Baku
20:30 AZT (UTC+4)	Kamara (yellow card) 33'; Hajiyev (yellow card) 45'; Tounkara 45+1'; Aliyev (yellow card) 90+4'	Report	Ramazanov (yellow card) 17'; Bongongui 57'; Anđelković 62'; Richard (yellow card) 72'; Muradov (yellow card) 90+1'	Stadium: ASK Arena; Attendance: 0 Referee: Kamal Umudlu
Note: Match played behind closed doors due to the COVID-19 pandemic in Azerbaijan.

29 April 2021 Match 10 1st leg	Zira (1)	2 – 3 (4 – 4 (a) agg.)	(1) Keşla	Zirə
20:00 AZT (UTC+4)	Muradov (yellow card) 26'; Aliyev 48' (o.g.); Hajili (yellow card) 84'; Đorđević (red card) 88'; Anđelković (yellow card) 90'; Clésio 92'; Azizli (yellow card) 96'; Bayramli (yellow card) 102'; Tashkin (red card) 120'	Report	Isgandarli (yellow card) 10'; Valizade (yellow card) 61'; Meza 67', 90+1' (pen.), 93'; Guliyev (yellow card) 79'; Bayramov (yellow card) 93'; Sílvio (yellow card) 110'	Stadium: Zira Olympic Sport Complex Stadium; Attendance: 0 Referee: Elcin Masiyev
Note: Match played behind closed doors due to the COVID-19 pandemic in Azerbaijan.

== Final ==
24 May 2021 Match 11	Sumgayit	1–2	Keşla	Masazır
19:30 AZT (UTC+4)	Bojović 3' (o.g.); Khodzhaniyazov (yellow card) 16'; Najafov (yellow card) 46'; Mustafayev (yellow card) 69'	Report	Aliyev (yellow card) 33' (goal) 37'; Bojović 57'	Stadium: Bank Respublika Arena; Referee: Aliyar Aghayev

== Goal scorers ==
As of matches played 24 May 2021

4 goals:

- (Paraguay) César Meza - Keşla

2 goals:

- (Nigeria) James Adeniyi - Gabala
- (Azerbaijan) Mahir Emreli - Qarabağ
- (Cape Verde) Patrick Andrade - Qarabağ
- (Azerbaijan) Afran Ismayilov - Sabail
- (Azerbaijan) Amil Yunanov - Sabail
- (Azerbaijan) Roini Ismayilov - Zagatala
- (Georgia (country)) Davit Volkovi - Zira
- (Serbia) Nemanja Anđelković - Zira

1 goals:

- (Montenegro) Stefan Vukčević - Gabala
- (Azerbaijan) Samir Qurbanov - Kapaz
- (Azerbaijan) Ali Samadov - Kapaz
- (Azerbaijan) Shahriyar Aliyev - Keşla
- (Azerbaijan) Rahman Hajiyev - Keşla
- (Cameroon) Anatole Abang - Keşla
- (Mali) Sadio Tounkara - Keşla
- (Montenegro) Mijuško Bojović - Keşla
- (Azerbaijan) Maksim Medvedev - Qarabağ
- (Ghana) Owusu Kwabena - Qarabağ
- (Serbia) Filip Ivanović - Sabah
- (Azerbaijan) Adil Naghiyev - Sabail
- (Azerbaijan) Ali Ghorbani - Sumgayit
- (Azerbaijan) Rahim Sadikhov - Sumgayit
- (Azerbaijan) Musa Gurbanli - Zira
- (Azerbaijan) Ilkin Muradov - Zira
- (Cameroon) Rodrigue Bongongui - Zira
- (Mozambique) Clésio - Zira

Own goals:

- (Azerbaijan) Shahriyar Aliyev (29 April 2021 vs Zira)
- (Montenegro) Mijuško Bojović (24 May 2021 vs Sumgayit)
