= List of Azerbaijan football transfers summer 2020 =

This is a list of Azerbaijan football transfers in the summer transfer window, 3 August-5 October 2020, by club. Only clubs of the 2020–21 Azerbaijan Premier League are included.

== Azerbaijan Premier League 2020-21 ==
=== Gabala ===
In: Note: Flags indicate national team as defined under FIFA eligibility rules; some limited exceptions apply. Players may hold more than one non-FIFA nationality.

No.	Pos.	Nation	Player
2	DF	CRO	Vinko Međimorec (from (Croatia) Slaven Belupo)
6	MF	AZE	Kamal Mirzayev (from (Kuwait) Al-Salmiya)
13	DF	ALB	Jurgen Goxha (from (Albania) Tirana)
14	MF	AZE	Javid Huseynov (from (Azerbaijan) Zira)
19	MF	AZE	Samir Gurbanov (loan return from (Czech Republic) Viktoria Žižkov)
23	FW	BRA	Raphael Utzig (from (Brazil) Paraná)
26	MF	MNE	Stefan Vukčević (from (Montenegro) Zeta)
55	MF	AZE	Idris Ingilabli (loan from (Azerbaijan) Sabah)
99	FW	NGA	James Adeniyi (loan return from (Israel) Hapoel Kiryat Shmona)

Out: Note: Flags indicate national team as defined under FIFA eligibility rules; some limited exceptions apply. Players may hold more than one non-FIFA nationality.

No.	Pos.	Nation	Player
2	DF	AZE	Amin Seydiyev (to (Azerbaijan) Sabah)
3	DF	CRO	Ivica Žunić (to (Romania) CFR Cluj)
8	MF	AZE	Gismat Aliyev (to (Azerbaijan) Zira)
10	FW	MOZ	Clésio (to (Azerbaijan) Zira)
12	MF	FRA	Abdelrafik Gérard
21	MF	ESP	Fernań López (to (Poland) Jagiellonia)
27	MF	AZE	Samir Maharramli (to (Azerbaijan) Sabah)
55	MF	AZE	Idris Ingilabli (to (Azerbaijan) Sabah)

=== Keşla ===
In: Note: Flags indicate national team as defined under FIFA eligibility rules; some limited exceptions apply. Players may hold more than one non-FIFA nationality.

No.	Pos.	Nation	Player
4	DF	AZE	Shahriyar Aliyev (from (Azerbaijan) Sumgayit)
7	MF	AZE	Rahman Hajiyev (loan from (Azerbaijan) Neftçi)
8	DF	AZE	Tural Akhundov (from (Azerbaijan) Neftçi)
9	MF	AZE	Javid Imamverdiyev (from (Azerbaijan) Sabah)
10	MF	PAR	César Meza Colli (from (Romania) Universitatea Craiova)
11	FW	BRA	Sílvio (from (Albania) Vllaznia)
14	MF	AZE	Turan Valizade (loan from (Azerbaijan) Neftçi)
16	MF	BRA	Alvaro (loan from (Ukraine) Lviv)
20	DF	AZE	Rail Malikov (from (Azerbaijan) Sumgayit)
23	DF	BRA	Artur (from (Ukraine) Vorskla)
48	MF	UKR	Dmytro Klyots (from (Ukraine) Karpaty Lviv)
85	GK	AZE	Kamal Bayramov (from (Azerbaijan) Sabail)
99	MF	AZE	Rafael Maharramli (loan from (Azerbaijan) Qarabağ)

Out: Note: Flags indicate national team as defined under FIFA eligibility rules; some limited exceptions apply. Players may hold more than one non-FIFA nationality.

No.	Pos.	Nation	Player
3	DF	AZE	Jabir Amirli (to (Azerbaijan) Neftçi)
4	DF	AZE	Slavik Alkhasov (to (Azerbaijan) Sabah)
5	DF	ARG	Franco Flores
7	MF	AZE	Tural Bayramli (to (Azerbaijan) Zira)
8	MF	AZE	Murad Agayev
9	FW	PAR	Lorenzo Frutos
10	MF	PAR	César Meza Colli (loan return to (Romania) Universitatea Craiova)
10	MF	AZE	Javid Imamverdiyev (to (Azerbaijan) Sumgayit)
11	FW	AZE	Ruslan Gurbanov (to (Azerbaijan) Zira)
22	MF	AZE	Afran Ismayilov (to (Azerbaijan) Sabail)
94	GK	AZE	Rashad Azizli (to (Azerbaijan) Zira)

=== Neftchi Baku ===
In: Note: Flags indicate national team as defined under FIFA eligibility rules; some limited exceptions apply. Players may hold more than one non-FIFA nationality.

No.	Pos.	Nation	Player
2	DF	AZE	Jabir Amirli (from (Azerbaijan) Keşla)
4	DF	BRA	Rener Pavão (from (Brazil) Fortaleza)
13	FW	CGO	Prince Ibara (loan from (Belgium) Beerschot)
17	MF	ALB	Bruno Telushi (from (Albania) Kukësi)
19	MF	AZE	Fahmin Muradbayli (loan return from (Azerbaijan) Sabail)
20	DF	AZE	Mert Çelik (loan from (Turkey) Başakşehir)
24	MF	NGA	Yusuf Lawal (from (Belgium) Lokeren)
29	MF	BEL	Sabir Bougrine (from (Luxembourg) F91 Dudelange)
91	DF	BRA	Thallyson (from (Brazil) Guarani)

Out: Note: Flags indicate national team as defined under FIFA eligibility rules; some limited exceptions apply. Players may hold more than one non-FIFA nationality.

No.	Pos.	Nation	Player
9	FW	FRA	Bagaliy Dabo (to (Cyprus) Apollon Limassol)
10	MF	BRA	Dário (to (Latvia) Riga)
11	MF	GRE	Vangelis Platellas (to (Greece) AE Larissa)
17	MF	AZE	Rahman Hajiyev (loan to (Azerbaijan) Keşla)
18	DF	AZE	Tural Akhundov (to (Azerbaijan) Keşla)
33	MF	AZE	Turan Valizade (loan to (Azerbaijan) Keşla)
77	MF	HAI	Donald Guerrier (to (Azerbaijan) Qarabağ)
93	MF	HAI	Soni Mustivar (to (Romania) Hermannstadt)

=== Qarabağ ===
In: Note: Flags indicate national team as defined under FIFA eligibility rules; some limited exceptions apply. Players may hold more than one non-FIFA nationality.

No.	Pos.	Nation	Player
6	MF	CPV	Patrick Andrade (from (Bulgaria) Cherno More)
8	MF	SRB	Uroš Matić (from (Denmark) Copenhagen)
12	GK	AZE	Emil Balayev (from (Azerbaijan) Zira)
21	DF	AZE	Rauf Huseynli (loan return from (Azerbaijan) Zira)
44	MF	AZE	Elvin Jafarguliyev (loan return from (Azerbaijan) Sumgayit)
77	MF	HAI	Donald Guerrier (from (Azerbaijan) Neftçi)
81	DF	COL	Kevin Medina (from (Portugal) Chaves)

Out: Note: Flags indicate national team as defined under FIFA eligibility rules; some limited exceptions apply. Players may hold more than one non-FIFA nationality.

No.	Pos.	Nation	Player
3	DF	BRA	Ailton (loan return to (Germany) VfB Stuttgart)
7	MF	AZE	Araz Abdullayev (loan return to (Greece) Panionios)
8	MF	ESP	Míchel (to (Spain) Marino)
13	GK	BRA	Vagner
14	DF	AZE	Rashad Sadygov (retired)
21	MF	AZE	Hajiagha Hajili (loan to (Azerbaijan) Zira)
23	DF	MAR	Faycal Rherras
70	MF	AZE	Nijat Suleymanov (release, previously on loan from (Azerbaijan) Zira)
94	GK	AZE	Nijat Mehbaliyev (to (Azerbaijan) Sabah)
99	FW	SEN	Magaye Gueye (to (Romania) FC Dinamo București)
—	MF	AZE	Rafael Maharramli (loan to (Azerbaijan) Keşla, previously on loan from (Azerbaijan) Zira)
—	MF	AZE	Ruslan Hajiyev (loan to (Azerbaijan) Sabail)

=== Sabah ===
In: Note: Flags indicate national team as defined under FIFA eligibility rules; some limited exceptions apply. Players may hold more than one non-FIFA nationality.

No.	Pos.	Nation	Player
2	DF	AZE	Amin Seydiyev (from (Azerbaijan) Gabala)
5	DF	MNE	Nikola Vujadinović (from (Slovenia) Domžale)
12	GK	URU	Álvaro Villete (loan from (Colombia) Patriotas)
14	DF	AZE	Slavik Alkhasov (from (Azerbaijan) Keşla)
27	MF	AZE	Samir Maharramli (from (Azerbaijan) Gabala)
33	FW	AZE	Jamal Jafarov (from (Russia) Anzhi Makhachkala)
46	MF	AZE	Aleksey Isayev (from (Azerbaijan) Sumgayit)
94	GK	AZE	Nijat Mehbaliyev (from (Azerbaijan) Qarabağ)
—	MF	AZE	Idris Ingilabli (from (Azerbaijan) Gabala)

Out: Note: Flags indicate national team as defined under FIFA eligibility rules; some limited exceptions apply. Players may hold more than one non-FIFA nationality.

No.	Pos.	Nation	Player
5	DF	AZE	Karim Diniyev (to (Azerbaijan) Zira)
6	MF	AZE	Vadim Abdullayev
10	MF	AZE	Javid Imamverdiyev (to (Azerbaijan) Keşla)
14	MF	AZE	Rashad Eyyubov (to (Azerbaijan) Zira)
22	MF	AZE	Elgun Nabiyev (to (Azerbaijan) Sabail)
24	DF	RUS	Anar Panayev (to (Russia) Legion Dynamo)
27	DF	AZE	Magsad Isayev (to (Azerbaijan) Sabail)
33	MF	AZE	Eltun Turabov (loan to (Azerbaijan) Sumgayit, previously on loan from (Albania) Bylis)
38	DF	AZE	Arsen Agjabayov (loan to (Azerbaijan) Sabail)
71	GK	UKR	Dmytro Bezruk
77	MF	AZE	Javid Taghiyev
—	MF	AZE	Idris Ingilabli (loan to (Azerbaijan) Gabala)

=== Sabail ===
In: Note: Flags indicate national team as defined under FIFA eligibility rules; some limited exceptions apply. Players may hold more than one non-FIFA nationality.

No.	Pos.	Nation	Player
1	GK	AZE	Kamran Agayev (Free agent)
8	MF	IRN	Bakhtiar Rahmani (from (Iran) Sanat Naft)
9	MF	MKD	Florian Kadriu (from (North Macedonia) Renova)
19	MF	AZE	Elgun Nabiyev (from (Azerbaijan) Sabah)
20	MF	AZE	Ruslan Hajiyev (loan from (Azerbaijan) Qarabağ)
22	MF	AZE	Afran Ismayilov (from (Azerbaijan) Keşla)
28	DF	AZE	Magsad Isayev (from (Azerbaijan) Sabah)
29	FW	AZE	Amil Yunanov (from (Azerbaijan) Sumgayit)
38	DF	AZE	Arsen Agjabayov (loan from (Azerbaijan) Sabah)
96	GK	GUA	Nicholas Hagen (from (Guatemala) Municipal)

Out: Note: Flags indicate national team as defined under FIFA eligibility rules; some limited exceptions apply. Players may hold more than one non-FIFA nationality.

No.	Pos.	Nation	Player
1	GK	UKR	Oleksandr Rybka (to (Latvia) Liepāja)
4	DF	AZE	Eltun Yagublu (retired)
7	MF	AZE	Fahmin Muradbayli (loan return to (Azerbaijan) Neftçi)
8	MF	COD	Lema Mabidi (to (Iraq) Al-Quwa Al-Jawiya)
10	MF	GHA	Michael Essien (to (Denmark) Nordsjælland)
13	DF	AZE	Shahriyar Rahimov (to (Azerbaijan) Zira)
21	DF	BRA	Erico Silva (to (Romania) UTA Arad)
85	GK	AZE	Kamal Bayramov (to (Azerbaijan) Keşla)

=== Sumgayit ===
In: Note: Flags indicate national team as defined under FIFA eligibility rules; some limited exceptions apply. Players may hold more than one non-FIFA nationality.

No.	Pos.	Nation	Player
4	DF	KAZ	Karam Sultanov (from (Kazakhstan) Caspiy)
7	MF	AZE	Tellur Mutallimov (from (Azerbaijan) Zira)
9	FW	AZE	Ali Ghorbani (from (Iran) Sepahan)
15	MF	AZE	Huseyn Jafarov (from (Portugal) União de Leiria)
21	MF	CAN	Adam Hemati (from (Iran) Pars Jonoubi Jam)
22	MF	AZE	Javid Imamverdiyev (from (Azerbaijan) Keşla)
33	MF	AZE	Eltun Turabov (loan from (Azerbaijan) Sabah)
60	MF	AZE	Elvin Mammadov (from (Azerbaijan) Zira)

Out: Note: Flags indicate national team as defined under FIFA eligibility rules; some limited exceptions apply. Players may hold more than one non-FIFA nationality.

No.	Pos.	Nation	Player
2	DF	AZE	Rail Malikov (to (Azerbaijan) Keşla)
4	DF	AZE	Shahriyar Aliyev (to (Azerbaijan) Keşla)
8	FW	IRN	Peyman Babaei (loan return to (Iran) Machine Sazi)
9	FW	AZE	Amil Yunanov (to (Azerbaijan) Sabail)
10	MF	AZE	Amir Agayev (to (Greece) Atromitos)
22	DF	AZE	Sertan Tashkin (to (Azerbaijan) Zira)
44	MF	AZE	Elvin Jafarguliyev (loan return to (Azerbaijan) Qarabağ)
46	MF	AZE	Aleksey Isayev (to (Azerbaijan) Sabah)
50	MF	AZE	Ilgar Gurbanov
70	FW	IRN	Mehdi Sharifi (to (Iran) Paykan)

=== Zira ===
In: Note: Flags indicate national team as defined under FIFA eligibility rules; some limited exceptions apply. Players may hold more than one non-FIFA nationality.

No.	Pos.	Nation	Player
1	GK	BRA	Matheus Albino (from (Brazil) Londrina)
2	DF	AZE	Sertan Tashkin (from (Azerbaijan) Sumgayit)
5	DF	AZE	Karim Diniyev (from (Azerbaijan) Sabah)
7	MF	AZE	Tural Bayramli (from (Azerbaijan) Keşla)
11	FW	MOZ	Clésio (from (Azerbaijan) Gabala)
12	DF	SRB	Lazar Đorđević (from (Serbia) Radnički Niš)
13	DF	AZE	Shahriyar Rahimov (from (Azerbaijan) Sabail)
14	MF	AZE	Rashad Eyyubov (from (Azerbaijan) Sabah)
17	FW	BRA	Caio Rangel (from (Brazil) Ferroviária)
21	MF	AZE	Hajiagha Hajili (loan from (Azerbaijan) Qarabağ)
22	GK	AZE	Rashad Azizli (from (Azerbaijan) Keşla)
30	MF	AZE	Richard Almeida (from (United Arab Emirates) Baniyas)
32	MF	AZE	Gismat Aliyev (from (Azerbaijan) Gabala)
44	DF	GRE	Dimitrios Chantakias (from (Bulgaria) Cherno More)
91	FW	AZE	Ruslan Gurbanov (from (Azerbaijan) Keşla)

Out: Note: Flags indicate national team as defined under FIFA eligibility rules; some limited exceptions apply. Players may hold more than one non-FIFA nationality.

No.	Pos.	Nation	Player
1	GK	AZE	Orkhan Sadigli
5	DF	GRE	Tasos Papazoglou (to (Greece) Xanthi)
6	DF	PER	Álvaro Ampuero (loan return to (Peru) Deportivo Municipal)
7	MF	AZE	Javid Huseynov (to (Azerbaijan) Gabala)
12	GK	AZE	Emil Balayev (to (Azerbaijan) Qarabağ)
14	DF	AZE	Bakhtiyar Hasanalizade
18	MF	MDA	Gheorghe Anton (to (Romania) Gloria Buzău)
23	MF	BOT	Mpho Kgaswane
25	DF	MNE	Miloš Bakrač
27	DF	ROU	Adrian Scarlatache (to (Romania) Hermannstadt)
28	GK	MNE	Bojan Zogović (to (Albania) Vllaznia)
33	DF	SRB	Jovan Krneta (to (Serbia) Inđija)
43	MF	FRA	Chafik Tigroudja
44	MF	AZE	Elvin Mammadov (to (Azerbaijan) Sumgayit)
48	FW	GHA	Richard Gadze (to (Moldova) Sheriff Tiraspol)
55	DF	AZE	Rauf Huseynli (loan return to (Azerbaijan) Qarabağ)
70	MF	AZE	Nijat Suleymanov (loan return to (Azerbaijan) Qarabağ)
88	MF	AZE	Tellur Mutallimov (to (Azerbaijan) Sumgayit)
99	MF	AZE	Rafael Maharramli (loan return to (Azerbaijan) Qarabağ)
