= 2021–22 Zira FK season =

Zira
2021-22 season
- President: Vugar Astanov
- Manager: Rashad Sadygov
- Stadium: Zira Olympic Sport Complex Stadium
- Premier League: 3rd
- Azerbaijan Cup: Runners Up
- Top goalscorer: League: Davit Volkovi (11); All: Davit Volkovi (11)

The Zira FK 2021-22 season was Zira's seventh Azerbaijan Premier League season, and eighth season in their history.

== Season events ==
On 25 May, Zira announced the signing of Tamkin Khalilzade from Sabah. The following day, 26 May, Zira also announced the signing of Mehdi Jannatov from Sumgayit to a two-year contract.

On 1 June, Hajiagha Hajili extended his loan deal with Zira from Qarabağ for an additional year, whilst Davit Volkovi also signed a new one-year contract with Zira.

Three days later, 4 June, Aghabala Ramazanov also signed a new one-year contract with Zira.

On 26 June, Zira announced the signing of Ruslan Abishov from Sabah on a one-year contract.

On 2 July, Zira announced the season-long loan signing of Welves from Lviv, and the permanent signing of Anar Nazirov from Gabala to a one-year contract.

On 12 July, Zira announced that they had extended their loan deal with Lviv for Filipe Pachtmann for an additional season, with the option to sign Pachtmann to a three-year permanent contract.

On 16 July, Zira announced the signing of Mohamed Hamdaoui from De Graafschap to a two-year contract.

On 4 August, Zira announced the singing of Gjorgi Stoilov to a two-year contract from Akademija Pandev, with the option of an additional year.

On 12 August, Zira announced the signings of Ramin Ahmadov and Rustam Nuriyev from Zagatala and Samir Gurbanov from Kapaz. Ahmadov and Gurbanov signed four-year contracts, whilst Nuriyev signed a three-year contract.

On 18 August, Zira announced the singing of Loris Brogno to a two-year contract from K Beerschot VA.

On 30 August, Zira announced the singing of Joshgun Diniyev to a two-year contract from Sabah.

On 9 February, Zira announced the signing of Rahil Mammadov on loan from Qarabağ for the remainder of the season, whilst Ahmed Isaiah joined on an 18-month contract from Sporting da Covilhã the following day.

Zira's match against Gabala on 13 March was postponed in the 65th minute due to weather conditions, with the remaining 25 minutes being played on 14 March at 12:30.

== Squad ==
As of match played 27 May 2022

No.	Name	Nationality	Position	Date of birth (age)	Signed from	Signed in	Contract ends	Apps.	Goals
Goalkeepers
1	Mehdi Jannatov	(Azerbaijan)	GK	26 January 1992 (aged 30)	Sumgayit	2021	2023	27	0
41	Anar Nazirov	(Azerbaijan)	GK	8 September 1985 (aged 36)	Gabala	2021	2022	7	0
62	Abdulla Seyidahmadov	(Azerbaijan)	GK	4 June 1997 (aged 24)	Trainee	2017		2	0
Defenders
2	Sertan Tashkin	(Azerbaijan)	DF	8 October 1997 (aged 24)	Keşla	2020	2022	51	0
4	Celal Hüseynov	(Azerbaijan)	DF	2 January 2003 (aged 19)	Trainee	2020		40	1
5	Rahil Mammadov	(Azerbaijan)	DF	24 November 1995 (aged 26)	loan from Qarabağ	2022	2022	9	0
6	Ayxan Süleymanlı	(Azerbaijan)	DF	16 January 2004 (aged 18)	Trainee	2020		1	0
15	Ruslan Abishov	(Azerbaijan)	DF	10 October 1987 (aged 34)	Sabah	2021	2022	2	0
19	Tamkin Khalilzade	(Azerbaijan)	DF	6 August 1993 (aged 28)	Sabah	2021		28	3
26	Nemanja Anđelković	(Serbia)	DF	26 April 1997 (aged 25)	Zlatibor Čajetina	2021	2023	37	3
44	Dimitrios Chantakias	(Greece)	DF	4 January 1995 (aged 27)	Cherno More	2020		56	1
51	Rustam Nuriyev	(Azerbaijan)	DF	6 March 2000 (aged 22)	Zagatala	2021	2024	2	0
Midfielders
8	Ilkin Muradov	(Azerbaijan)	MF	5 March 1996 (aged 26)	Academy	2019		120	3
9	Loris Brogno	(Belgium)	MF	18 September 1992 (aged 29)	K Beerschot VA	2021	2023	28	5
13	Ramin Ahmadov	(Azerbaijan)	MF	1 June 2001 (aged 20)	Zagatala	2021	2025	11	1
14	Hamidou Keyta	(France)	MF	17 December 1994 (aged 27)	Santa Clara	2022	2023	18	7
20	Ali Shirinov	(Azerbaijan)	MF	9 August 1998 (aged 23)	Daugavpils	2020		4	0
21	Hajiagha Hajili	(Azerbaijan)	MF	30 January 1998 (aged 24)	loan from Qarabağ	2020	2022	57	0
32	Gismat Aliyev	(Azerbaijan)	MF	24 October 1996 (aged 25)	Gabala	2020	2022	57	4
56	Samir Agayev	(Azerbaijan)	MF	25 May 2002 (aged 20)	Trainee	2021		1	0
64	Mahmud Ağayev	(Azerbaijan)	MF		Trainee	2021		0	0
91	Coşqun Diniyev	(Azerbaijan)	MF	13 September 1995 (aged 26)	Sabah	2021	2023	30	2
92	Bryan Alceus	(Haiti)	MF	1 February 1996 (aged 26)	Gaz Metan Mediaș	2022	2024	6	0
99	Ahmed Isaiah	(Nigeria)	MF	10 October 1995 (aged 26)	Sporting da Covilhã	2022	2023	14	1
Forwards
7	Filipe Pachtmann	(Brazil)	FW	11 April 2000 (aged 22)	loan from Lviv	2021	2022	3	0
10	Aghabala Ramazanov	(Azerbaijan)	FW	20 January 1993 (aged 29)	Sabail	2020	2022	51	13
18	Davit Volkovi	(Georgia (country))	FW	3 June 1995 (aged 26)	Gabala	2020	2022	68	22
47	Mo Hamdaoui	(Netherlands)	FW	10 June 1993 (aged 28)	De Graafschap	2021	2023	32	4
77	Samir Gurbanov	(Azerbaijan)	FW	24 November 2000 (aged 21)	Kapaz	2021	2025	0	0
Out on loan
22	Rashad Azizli	(Azerbaijan)	GK	1 January 1994 (aged 28)	Keşla	2020		3	0
Left during the season
5	Rauf Huseynli	(Azerbaijan)	DF	25 January 2000 (aged 22)	loan from Qarabağ	2021		5	0
11	Welves	(Brazil)	FW	24 November 2000 (aged 21)	loan from Lviv	2021	2022	2	0
88	Gjorgi Stoilov	(North Macedonia)	MF	25 August 1995 (aged 26)	Akademija Pandev	2021	2023(+1)	5	0

=== Out on loan ===
Note: Flags indicate national team as defined under FIFA eligibility rules; some limited exceptions apply. Players may hold more than one non-FIFA nationality.

No.	Pos.	Nation	Player
22	GK	AZE	Rashad Azizli (at Sabail)

== Transfers ==
=== In ===
Date	Position	Nationality	Name	From	Fee	Ref.
25 May 2021	DF	(Azerbaijan)	Tamkin Khalilzade	Sabah	Undisclosed	
26 May 2021	GK	(Azerbaijan)	Mehdi Jannatov	Sumgayit	Undisclosed	
26 June 2021	DF	(Azerbaijan)	Ruslan Abishov	Sabah	Undisclosed	
2 July 2021	GK	(Azerbaijan)	Anar Nazirov	Gabala	Undisclosed	
16 July 2021	FW	(Netherlands)	Mo Hamdaoui	De Graafschap	Undisclosed	
4 August 2021	MF	(North Macedonia)	Gjorgi Stoilov	Akademija Pandev	Undisclosed	
12 August 2021	DF	(Azerbaijan)	Rustam Nuriyev	Zagatala	Undisclosed	
12 August 2021	MF	(Azerbaijan)	Ramin Ahmadov	Zagatala	Undisclosed	
12 August 2021	FW	(Azerbaijan)	Samir Gurbanov	Kapaz	Undisclosed	
18 August 2021	MF	(Belgium)	Loris Brogno	K Beerschot VA	Undisclosed	
30 August 2021	MF	(Azerbaijan)	Joshgun Diniyev	Sabah	Free	
26 January 2022	MF	(France)	Hamidou Keyta	Santa Clara	Undisclosed	
27 January 2022	MF	(Haiti)	Bryan Alceus	Gaz Metan Mediaș	Undisclosed	
10 February 2022	MF	(Nigeria)	Ahmed Isaiah	Sporting da Covilhã	Undisclosed	

=== Loans in ===
Date from	Position	Nationality	Name	From	Date to	Ref.
1 June 2021	MF	(Azerbaijan)	Hajiagha Hajili	Qarabağ	End of season	
9 July 2021	DF	(Azerbaijan)	Rauf Huseynli	Qarabağ	15 January 2022	
2 July 2021	FW	(Brazil)	Welves	Lviv	31 December 2021	
12 July 2021	FW	(Brazil)	Filipe Pachtmann	Lviv	End of season	
9 February 2022	DF	(Azerbaijan)	Rahil Mammadov	Qarabağ	End of season	

=== Out ===
Date	Position	Nationality	Name	To	Fee	Ref.
27 January 2022	MF	(North Macedonia)	Gjorgi Stoilov	Shkupi	Undisclosed	

=== Loans in ===
Date from	Position	Nationality	Name	From	Date to	Ref.
4 February 2022	GK	(Azerbaijan)	Rashad Azizli	Sabail	End of season	

=== Released ===
Date	Position	Nationality	Name	Joined	Date	Ref
22 June 2021	DF	(Azerbaijan)	Shahriyar Rahimov	Sabail	22 June 2021	
22 June 2021	FW	(Argentina)	Facundo Melivilo	Güemes	7 January 2022	
31 May 2022	MF	(Haiti)	Bryan Alceus	Argeș Pitești	1 July 2022	
31 May 2022	FW	(Azerbaijan)	Aghabala Ramazanov	Sabail	1 July 2022	
31 May 2022	FW	(Georgia (country))	Davit Volkovi	Sabah	12 June 2022	

== Friendlies ==
16 July 2021	Zira	3 – 0	Gabala	Zirə
AZT (UTC+4)	Aliyev; Ramazanov; Welves	Report		Stadium: Zira Olympic Sport Complex Stadium

30 July 2021	Zira	1 – 2	Gabala	Baku
AZT (UTC+4)	Welves 59'	Report	Akakpo 10'; Mirzayev 87'	Stadium: Dalga Arena

20 January 2022	Zira (Azerbaijan)	2 – 2	(Poland) Górnik Łęczna	Belek, Turkey
17:00 AZT (UTC+4)	Khalilzade 49' (pen.); Muradov 60'	Report	Śpiączka 21' (pen.); Mak 50'

24 January 2022	Zira (Azerbaijan)	1 – 1	(North Macedonia) Bregalnica Štip	Belek, Turkey
17:00 AZT (UTC+4)	Volkovi 14'	Report	V.Dujovski 5'

27 March 2022	Zira	1 – 2	Gabala	Zirə
16:00 AZT (UTC+4)	Keyta 5'	Report	Alimi 49'; Utzig 63'	Stadium: Tofiq Bahramov Republican Stadium

== Competitions ==
=== Overview ===
Competition	First match	Last match	Starting round	Final position	Record							
Competition	First match	Last match	Starting round	Final position	Pld	W	D	L	GF	GA	GD	Win %
Premier League	15 August 2021	21 May 2022	Matchday 1	3rd	28	13	8	7	32	27	+5	46.43
Azerbaijan Cup	2 February 2022		Quarterfinal	Runners Up	5	2	3	0	8	2	+6	40.00
Total					33	15	11	7	40	29	+11	45.45

Last updated: 27 May 2022
Source: Competitions

=== Premier League ===
==== Results summary ====
Overall								Home						Away					
Pld	W	D	L	GF	GA	GD	Pts	W	D	L	GF	GA	GD	W	D	L	GF	GA	GD
28	13	8	7	33	27	+6	47	7	3	4	16	14	+2	6	5	3	17	13	+4

Last updated: 21 May 2022.
Source: See Results

==== Results by round ====
Round	1	2	3	4	5	6	7	8	9	10	11	12	13	14	15	16	17	18	19	20	21	22	23	24	25	26	27	28
Ground	H	H	A	H	A	H	A	A	H	A	H	A	H	A	A	H	A	H	A	H	A	A	H	A	H	A	H	H
Result	D	L	W	D	W	W	D	L	W	D	W	W	L	L	W	W	W	W	D	L	D	L	W	W	L	D	W	D
Position	5	6	6	6	4	4	4	4	4	4	3	2	3	4	3	3	3	2	3	3	3	3	3	3	3	3	3	3

Updated to match(es) played on 21 May 2022. Source: See Results
A = Away; H = Home; W = Win; D = Draw; L = Loss

==== Results ====
15 August 2021 1	Zira	1 – 1	Qarabağ	Zirə
18:00 AZT (UTC+4)	Stoilov (yellow card) 19'; Hajili (yellow card) 44'; Khalilzade 50' (pen.); Ramazanov (yellow card) 81'	Report	Ibrahimli 18' (yellow card) 28'; Mustafazade (yellow card) 49'; Ozobić (yellow card) 88'; Richard (yellow card) 90+4'	Stadium: Zira Olympic Sport Complex Stadium; Referee: Rauf Jabbarov

22 August 2021 2	Zira	1 – 2	Neftçi	Zirə
18:30 AZT (UTC+4)	Tashkin (yellow card) 8'; Muradov (yellow card) 45+2'; Volkovi 90+4'	Report	Mbodj (yellow card) 16'; Abbasov (yellow card) 45+1'; Muradbayli 72'; Basto (yellow card) 83'; Kané (yellow card) 90+2'; Harramiz (yellow card) 90'; Mahmudov 90+3'	Stadium: Zira Olympic Sport Complex Stadium; Referee: Kamal Umudlu

11 September 2021 3	Keşla	0 – 2	Zira	Baku
20:15 AZT (UTC+4)	Abang (red card) 28'; E.Mustafayev (yellow card) 30'; Felipe Santos (yellow card) 83'	Report	Ramazanov (yellow card) 1'; N.Andjelkovic (yellow card) 49'; Volkovi 63', 72'; Hamdaoui (yellow card) 79'	Stadium: ASK Arena; Referee: Aliyar Ağayev

18 September 2021 4	Zira	1 – 1	Sabah	Zirə
19:15 AZT (UTC+4)	Huseynov (yellow card) 22'; Stoilov (yellow card) 25'; Hamdaoui 49'; Khalilzade (yellow card) 60'	Report	Ochihava (yellow card) 12'; M.Ergemlidze (yellow card) 44'; Fofana (yellow card) 76'; Peričić 83'	Stadium: Zira Olympic Sport Complex Stadium; Referee: Ingilab Mammadov

25 September 2021 5	Sabail	1 – 2	Zira	Baku
19:15 AZT (UTC+4)	Goxha 45'; E.Tagiyev (yellow card) 64'; Amirguliyev (yellow card) 69'; Taghiyev (yellow card) 90+1'	Report	Volkovi 17', 40'; Khalilzade (yellow card) 22'; Stoilov (yellow card) 47'; Hajili (yellow card) 67'; Aliyev (yellow card) 83'	Stadium: Bayil Arena; Referee: Kamal Umudlu

1 October 2021 6	Zira	1 – 0	Sumgayit	Zirə
19:30 AZT (UTC+4)	Brogno 14' (yellow card) 45'; Jannatov (yellow card) 90+1'; Diniyev (yellow card) 90+4'	Report	Haghverdi (yellow card) 85'; Khachayev (yellow card) 87'	Stadium: Zira Olympic Sport Complex Stadium; Referee: Rauf Jabarov

16 October 2021 7	Gabala	1 – 1	Zira	Qabala
17:00 AZT (UTC+4)	Ruan (yellow card) 45+3'; López (yellow card) 60'; Alimi (yellow card) 62'; Isgandarov 79'; Shahverdiyev (red card) 90+5'	Report	Huseynov 18'; Khalilzade (yellow card) 71'; Hajili (yellow card) 88'; Chantakias (yellow card) 90+5'	Stadium: Gabala City Stadium; Referee: Aliyar Ağayev

23 October 2021 8	Neftçi	2 – 1	Zira	Baku
18:15 AZT (UTC+4)	Mbodj (yellow card) 12'; Meza 39'; Lawal (yellow card) 62'; Abbasov 84'; Najafov (yellow card) 90+4'	Report	Ramazanov 6'; Volkovi (yellow card) 60'; Hajili (yellow card) 77'	Stadium: Eighth Kilometer District Stadium; Referee: Ravan Hamzazada

30 October 2021 9	Zira	2 – 0	Keşla	Zirə
16:00 AZT (UTC+4)	Brogno 17'; Ramazanov 42'; Aliyev (yellow card) 45+1'	Report	Guliyev (yellow card) 33'; Aliyev (yellow card) 79'; Akhundov (red card) 90+4'	Stadium: Zira Olympic Sport Complex Stadium; Referee: Raad Ahmadov

6 November 2021 10	Sabah	3 – 3	Zira	Masazır
15:00 AZT (UTC+4)	Mickels 2', 24' (yellow card) 44'; Ochihava (yellow card) 18'; Cámara (yellow card) 40' (yellow-red card) 48' (goal) 45+2'; Fofana (yellow card) 45'	Report	Volkovi 5', 60', 81'; Aliyev (yellow card) 9'; N.Andjelkovic (yellow card) 70'	Stadium: Bank Respublika Arena; Referee: Kamal Umudlu

20 November 2021 11	Zira	3 – 1	Sabail	Zirə
16:00 AZT (UTC+4)	Aliyev 23'; Volkovi 47'; Brogno 74'	Report	Arago (yellow card) 49'; Aliyev 87' (pen.)	Stadium: Zira Olympic Sport Complex Stadium; Referee: Aliyar Ağayev

28 November 2021 12	Sumgayit	0 – 3	Zira	Sumgait
16:00 AZT (UTC+4)	Haghverdi (yellow card) 13'; Abdullazade (yellow card) 90+2'	Report	Khalilzade 14' (pen.); Hamdaoui (yellow card) 16'; Aliyev 30'; Hüseynov (yellow card) 41'; Diniyev 79' (yellow card) 84'; Jannatov (yellow card) 89'; Chantakias (yellow card) 90+5'	Stadium: Kapital Bank Arena; Referee: Rauf Jabarov

5 December 2021 13	Zira	1 – 2	Gabala	Zirə
18:15 AZT (UTC+4)	R.Nuruyev (yellow card) 15'; Hüseynov (yellow card) 29'; Volkovi (yellow card) 42' (goal) 45+4'; Jannatov (yellow card) 90+2'	Report	Abbasov 32' (yellow card) 74'; Muradov (yellow card) 37' (goal) 40'; Hani (yellow card) 62' (yellow-red card) 87'	Stadium: Zira Olympic Sport Complex Stadium; Referee: Elcin Məsiyev

16 December 2021 14	Qarabağ	2 – 0	Zira	Baku
19:00 AZT (UTC+4)	Gurbanlı 6', 54'; Bayramov (yellow card) 9'; Sheydayev (yellow card) 26'; Mammadov (yellow card) 74'; Andrade (yellow card) 80'	Report		Stadium: Azersun Arena; Referee: Ravan Hamzazada

7 February 2022 15	Keşla	0 – 1	Zira	Baku
16:00 AZT (UTC+4)	Azadov (yellow card) 10'; Qirtimov (yellow card) 35' (yellow-red card) 39'; Tounkara (yellow card) 37'; Aliyev (yellow card) 44'; Gigauri (yellow card) 82'	Report	Keyta (yellow card) 31'; Hamdaoui 45'; Chantakias (yellow card) 82'	Stadium: ASK Arena; Referee: Ingilab Mammadov

20 February 2022 16	Zira	2 – 0	Sabah	Zirə
17:00 AZT (UTC+4)	Brogno (yellow card) 35'; Keyta 63', 90+4'; Taşqın (yellow card) 90+4'	Report	Fofana (yellow card) 42'; Peričić (yellow card) 89'	Stadium: Zira Olympic Sport Complex Stadium; Referee: Kamal Umudlu

28 February 2022 17	Sabail	0 – 1	Zira	Bayil
17:00 AZT (UTC+4)	Bayramli (yellow card) 54'; Naghiyev (yellow card) 66'; Abbasov (yellow card) 79'; Arago (yellow card) 84'	Report	Ramazanov 45+2' (yellow card) 47'; Khalilzade (yellow card) 53'	Stadium: Bayil Arena; Referee: Elcin Masiyev

5 March 2022 18	Zira	1 – 0	Sumgayit	Zirə
17:00 AZT (UTC+4)	Volkovi (yellow card) 41'; Hajili (yellow card) 44'; Hamdaoui (yellow card) 65'	Report	Ghorbani (yellow card) 16'; Beybalayev (yellow card) 90+2'	Stadium: Zira Olympic Sport Complex Stadium; Referee: Rauf Allahverdiyev

13 March 2022 19	Gabala	0 – 0	Zira	Qabala
16:00 AZT (UTC+4)	López (yellow card) 90+3'	Report	Hamdaoui (yellow card) 35'; Mammadov (yellow card) 51'; Alceus (yellow card) 68'; Hajili (yellow card) 90+3'	Stadium: Gabala City Stadium; Referee: Aliyar Agayev
Note: Match was postponed in the 65th minute on 13 March due to weather conditions, with the remaining 25 minutes being played on 14 March at 12:30.

19 March 2022 20	Zira	0 – 3	Qarabağ	Zirə
19:00 AZT (UTC+4)	Aliyev (yellow card) 55'; Diniyev (yellow card) 75'	Report	Sheydayev 10' (yellow card) 55'; P.Andrade (yellow card) 35'; Kady 48', 65'; Cafarguliyev (yellow card) 53'; Richard (yellow card) 90+1'	Stadium: Zira Olympic Sport Complex Stadium; Referee: Rauf Jabarov

3 April 2022 21	Zira	1 – 1	Neftçi	Baku
17:15 AZT (UTC+4)	Israfilov (yellow card) 18' (yellow-red card) 77'; Aliyev (yellow card) 73'; Bezerra 90+5' (pen.)	Report	Brogno (yellow card) 20'; Isaiah (yellow card) 38' (goal) 89'; Diniyev (yellow card) 45' (yellow-red card) 61'; Khalilzade (yellow card) 73'; Nazirov (yellow card) 73'; Taşqın (yellow card) 90'; Ramazanov (yellow card) 90' (yellow-red card) 90'; Jannatov (yellow card) 90+3'	Stadium: Eighth Kilometer District Stadium; Referee: Ingilab Məmmədov

9 April 2022 22	Sabah	3 – 1	Zira	Masazır
17:00 AZT (UTC+4)	Rangel (yellow card) 18' (goal) 40'; Hasanalizade (yellow card) 50'; Kashchuk (yellow card) 51'; Mickels 58'; Camalov (yellow card) 80'; Y.İmanov (yellow card) 82'; M.Ergemlidze (yellow card) 90+3'; Rodríguez 90+5'	Report	Keyta 48'	Stadium: Bank Respublika Arena; Referee: Raad Ahmadov

16 April 2022 23	Zira	2 – 1	Sabail	Zirə
18:15 AZT (UTC+4)	Keyta 32', 34' (pen.) (yellow card) 72'; Aliyev (yellow card) 50'	Report	E.Tagiyev (yellow card) 21'; Rajsel 90+5' (pen.)	Stadium: Zira Olympic Sport Complex Stadium; Referee: Aliyar Ağayev

24 April 2022 24	Sumgayit	0 – 1	Zira	Sumgait
20:00 AZT (UTC+4)	Khachayev (yellow card) 8'; Abdullazade (yellow card) 40'; Haghverdi (yellow card) 75'	Report	Volkovi 90+2'; Nazirov (yellow card) 90+2'	Stadium: Kapital Bank Arena; Referee: Elcin Masiyev

4 May 2022 25	Zira	0 – 3	Gabala	Zirə
17:45 AZT (UTC+4)	Brogno (yellow card) 10'	Report	Mammadov (yellow card) 15'; López 26' (yellow card) 53'; Utzig 45' (yellow card) 90+1'; Isgandarov (yellow card) 71'; Hani 81'	Stadium: Zira Olympic Sport Complex Stadium; Referee: Raad Ahmadov

7 May 2022 26	Qarabağ	0 – 0	Zira	Baku
20:15 AZT (UTC+4)		Report		Stadium: Azersun Arena; Referee: Kamal Umudlu

15 May 2022 27	Zira	1 – 0	Neftçi	Zirə
17:00 AZT (UTC+4)	Khalilzade (yellow card) 22'; Hajili (yellow card) 23'; R.Ahmadov 82'; Nazirov (yellow card) 90+6'	Report	Salahlı (yellow card) 12'; Lawal (yellow card) 21'; Mbodj (yellow card) 29'; Mahmudov (yellow card) 34'; Aliyev (yellow card) 35'; Ramon (yellow card) 36'; Buludov (yellow card) 74'; Israfilov (yellow card) 76'	Stadium: Zira Olympic Sport Complex Stadium; Referee: Rauf Jabarov

20 May 2022 28	Zira	0 – 0	Shamakhi	Zirə
17:00 AZT (UTC+4)	Hamdaoui (yellow card) 8'; Diniyev (yellow card) 24'; Taşqın (yellow card) 27'; Keyta (red card) 87'	Report	Aldair (yellow card) 24'; Felipe Santos (yellow card) 45+1'; A.Valiyev (yellow card) 90+3'	Stadium: Zira Olympic Sport Complex Stadium; Referee: Rauf Allahverdiyev

==== League table ====
Pos	Team	Pld	W	D	L	GF	GA	GD	Pts	Qualification
1	Qarabağ (C)	28	21	6	1	72	13	+59	69	Qualification for the Champions League first qualifying round
2	Neftçi Baku	28	15	5	8	42	31	+11	50	Qualification to Europa Conference League second qualifying round
3	Zira	28	13	8	7	33	27	+6	47	Qualification to Europa Conference League second qualifying round
4	Gabala	28	12	9	7	38	34	+4	45	Qualification to Europa Conference League second qualifying round
5	Sabah	28	12	5	11	42	34	+8	41	

Source: Soccerway
Rules for classification: 1) Points; 2) Head-to-head points; 3) Head-to-head goal difference; 4) Head-to-head goals scored; 5) Head-to-head away goals scored (only if two teams); 6) Goal difference; 7) Goals scored.
(C) Champions

=== Azerbaijan Cup ===
2 February 2022 Quarterfinal 1st leg	Zira	4 – 0	Sabail	Zirə
17:00 AZT (UTC+4)	Hamdaoui 45+2'; Brogno 59', 86'; Volkovi (yellow card) 66'; Keyta 72'	Report	Goxha (yellow card) 66'	Stadium: Zira Olympic Sport Complex Stadium; Referee: Kamal Umudlu

14 February 2022 Quarterfinal 2nd leg	Sabail	1 – 3 (1 – 7 agg.)	Zira	Baku
18:00 AZT (UTC+4)	V.Cəfərov (yellow card) 3'; Hajiyev 7'; Rahimli (yellow card) 75'	Report	Alceus (yellow card) 16'; Ramazanov 21'; R.Ahmedov (yellow card) 27'; Khalilzade 39' (pen.); Diniyev 73'	Stadium: Bayil Arena; Referee: Aliyar Agayev

20 April 2022 Semifinal 1st leg	Zira	0 – 0	Neftçi	Zirə
20:00 AZT (UTC+4)		Report	Meza (yellow card) 82'	Stadium: Zira Olympic Sport Complex Stadium; Referee: Rauf Jabarov

28 April 2022 Semifinal 2nd leg	Neftçi	0 – 0 (0 – 0 agg.) (2 – 4 p)	Zira	Baku
20:30 AZT (UTC+4)	Yusifli (yellow card) 49'	Report	Chantakias (yellow card) 28'; Khalilzade (yellow card) 61'	Stadium: Eighth Kilometer District Stadium; Referee: Aliyar Agayev
	Penalties
	Mahmudov (penalty scored); Bezerra (penalty scored); Israfilov (penalty missed); Pato (penalty missed)		Keyta (penalty scored); Khalilzade (penalty scored); Aliyev (penalty scored); Volkovi (penalty scored)

==== Final ====
27 May 2022	Zira	1 – 1 (a.e.t.) (3 – 4 p)	Qarabağ	Qabala
19:00 AZT (UTC+4)	Zoubir 69'; Garayev (yellow card) 87'	Report	Keyta 17' (yellow card) 120+1'; Chantakias (yellow card) 59'; Nazirov (yellow card) 85'; Hajili (yellow card) 103'; Ramazanov (yellow card) 114'	Stadium: Gabala City Stadium; Referee: Aliyar Aghayev
	Penalties
	Garayev (penalty scored); Medvedev (penalty scored); Kady (penalty missed); Bayramov (penalty scored); Sheydayev (penalty scored)		Keyta (penalty scored); Volkovi (penalty missed); Isaiah (penalty scored); Hüseynov (penalty scored); Taşqın (penalty missed)

== Squad statistics ==
As of Match played 27 May 2022

=== Appearances and goals ===
No.	Pos	Nat	Player	Total		Premier League		Azerbaijan Cup	
No.	Pos	Nat	Player	Apps	Goals	Apps	Goals	Apps	Goals
1	GK	(Azerbaijan) AZE	Mehdi Jannatov	27	0	24	0	3	0
2	DF	(Azerbaijan) AZE	Sertan Tashkin	23	1	12+9	1	1+1	0
4	DF	(Azerbaijan) AZE	Celal Hüseynov	30	1	23+3	1	4	0
5	DF	(Azerbaijan) AZE	Rahil Mammadov	9	0	5+2	0	1+1	0
8	MF	(Azerbaijan) AZE	Ilkin Muradov	23	0	8+11	0	2+2	0
9	MF	(Belgium) BEL	Loris Brogno	28	5	19+5	3	2+2	2
10	FW	(Azerbaijan) AZE	Aghabala Ramazanov	23	4	14+7	3	2	1
13	MF	(Azerbaijan) AZE	Ramin Ahmadov	11	1	3+6	1	1+1	0
14	MF	(France) FRA	Hamidou Keyta	18	7	12+2	5	3+1	2
15	DF	(Azerbaijan) AZE	Ruslan Abishov	2	0	0+1	0	0+1	0
18	FW	(Georgia (country)) GEO	Davit Volkovi	33	11	23+5	11	5	0
19	DF	(Azerbaijan) AZE	Tamkin Khalilzade	28	3	22+1	2	5	1
21	MF	(Azerbaijan) AZE	Hajiagha Hajili	28	0	17+7	0	4	0
26	DF	(Serbia) SRB	Nemanja Anđelković	18	0	15	0	3	0
32	MF	(Azerbaijan) AZE	Gismat Aliyev	31	2	25+2	2	4	0
41	GK	(Azerbaijan) AZE	Anar Nazirov	7	0	4+1	0	2	0
44	DF	(Greece) GRE	Dimitrios Chantakias	28	0	18+5	0	5	0
47	FW	(Netherlands) NED	Mo Hamdaoui	32	4	26+2	3	2+2	1
51	DF	(Azerbaijan) AZE	Rustam Nuriyev	2	0	1+1	0	0	0
56	MF	(Azerbaijan) AZE	Samir Agayev	1	0	0	0	0+1	0
91	MF	(Azerbaijan) AZE	Coşqun Diniyev	30	2	24+1	1	4+1	1
92	MF	(Haiti) HAI	Bryan Alceus	6	0	1+4	0	1	0
99	MF	(Nigeria) NGR	Ahmed Isaiah	14	1	6+4	1	1+3	0
Players away on loan:
Players who left Zira during the season:
5	DF	(Azerbaijan) AZE	Rauf Huseynli	2	0	1+1	0	0	0
11	FW	(Brazil) BRA	Welves	2	0	1+1	0	0	0
88	MF	(North Macedonia) MKD	Gjorgi Stoilov	5	0	4+1	0	0	0

=== Goal scorers ===
Place	Position	Nation	Number	Name	Premier League	Azerbaijan Cup	Total
1	FW	(Georgia (country))	18	Davit Volkovi	11	0	11
2	MF	(France)	14	Hamidou Keyta	5	2	7
3	MF	(Belgium)	9	Loris Brogno	3	2	5
4	FW	(Azerbaijan)	10	Aghabala Ramazanov	3	1	4
4	FW	(Netherlands)	47	Mo Hamdaoui	3	1	4
6	DF	(Azerbaijan)	19	Tamkin Khalilzade	2	1	3
7	MF	(Azerbaijan)	32	Gismat Aliyev	2	0	2
7	MF	(Azerbaijan)	91	Coşqun Diniyev	1	1	2
9	DF	(Azerbaijan)	4	Celal Hüseynov	1	0	1
9	MF	(Nigeria)	99	Ahmed Isaiah	1	0	1
9	MF	(Azerbaijan)	13	Ramin Ahmadov	1	0	1
				TOTALS	33	8	41

=== Clean sheets ===
Place	Position	Nation	Number	Name	Premier League	Azerbaijan Cup	Total
1	GK	(Azerbaijan)	1	Mehdi Jannatov	10	3	13
2	GK	(Azerbaijan)	41	Anar Nazirov	3	0	3
				TOTALS	13	3	16

=== Disciplinary record ===
Number	Nation	Position	Name	Premier League		Azerbaijan Cup		Total	
Number	Nation	Position	Name	Yellow card	Red card	Yellow card	Red card	Yellow card	Red card
1	(Azerbaijan)	GK	Mehdi Jannatov	4	0	0	0	4	0
2	(Azerbaijan)	DF	Sertan Tashkin	4	0	0	0	4	0
4	(Azerbaijan)	DF	Celal Hüseynov	3	0	0	0	3	0
5	(Azerbaijan)	DF	Rahil Mammadov	1	0	0	0	1	0
8	(Azerbaijan)	MF	Ilkin Muradov	1	0	0	0	1	0
9	(Belgium)	MF	Loris Brogno	4	0	0	0	4	0
10	(Azerbaijan)	FW	Aghabala Ramazanov	5	1	0	0	5	1
13	(Azerbaijan)	MF	Ramin Ahmadov	0	0	1	0	1	0
14	(France)	MF	Hamidou Keyta	2	1	1	0	3	1
18	(Georgia (country))	FW	Davit Volkovi	3	0	1	0	4	0
19	(Azerbaijan)	DF	Tamkin Khalilzade	6	0	0	0	6	0
21	(Azerbaijan)	MF	Hajiagha Hajili	7	0	1	0	8	0
26	(Serbia)	DF	Nemanja Anđelković	2	0	0	0	2	0
32	(Azerbaijan)	MF	Gismat Aliyev	5	0	0	0	5	0
41	(Azerbaijan)	DF	Anar Nazirov	3	0	1	0	4	0
44	(Greece)	DF	Dimitrios Chantakias	3	0	2	0	5	0
47	(Netherlands)	FW	Mo Hamdaoui	4	0	0	0	4	0
51	(Azerbaijan)	DF	Rustam Nuriyev	1	0	0	0	1	0
91	(Azerbaijan)	MF	Coşqun Diniyev	6	1	0	0	6	1
92	(Haiti)	MF	Bryan Alceus	1	0	1	0	2	0
99	(Nigeria)	MF	Ahmed Isaiah	1	0	0	0	1	0
Players who left Zira during the season:
88	(North Macedonia)	MF	Gjorgi Stoilov	3	0	0	0	3	0
			TOTALS	69	3	8	0	77	3
