= Gjorgi Stoilov =

Macedonian footballer

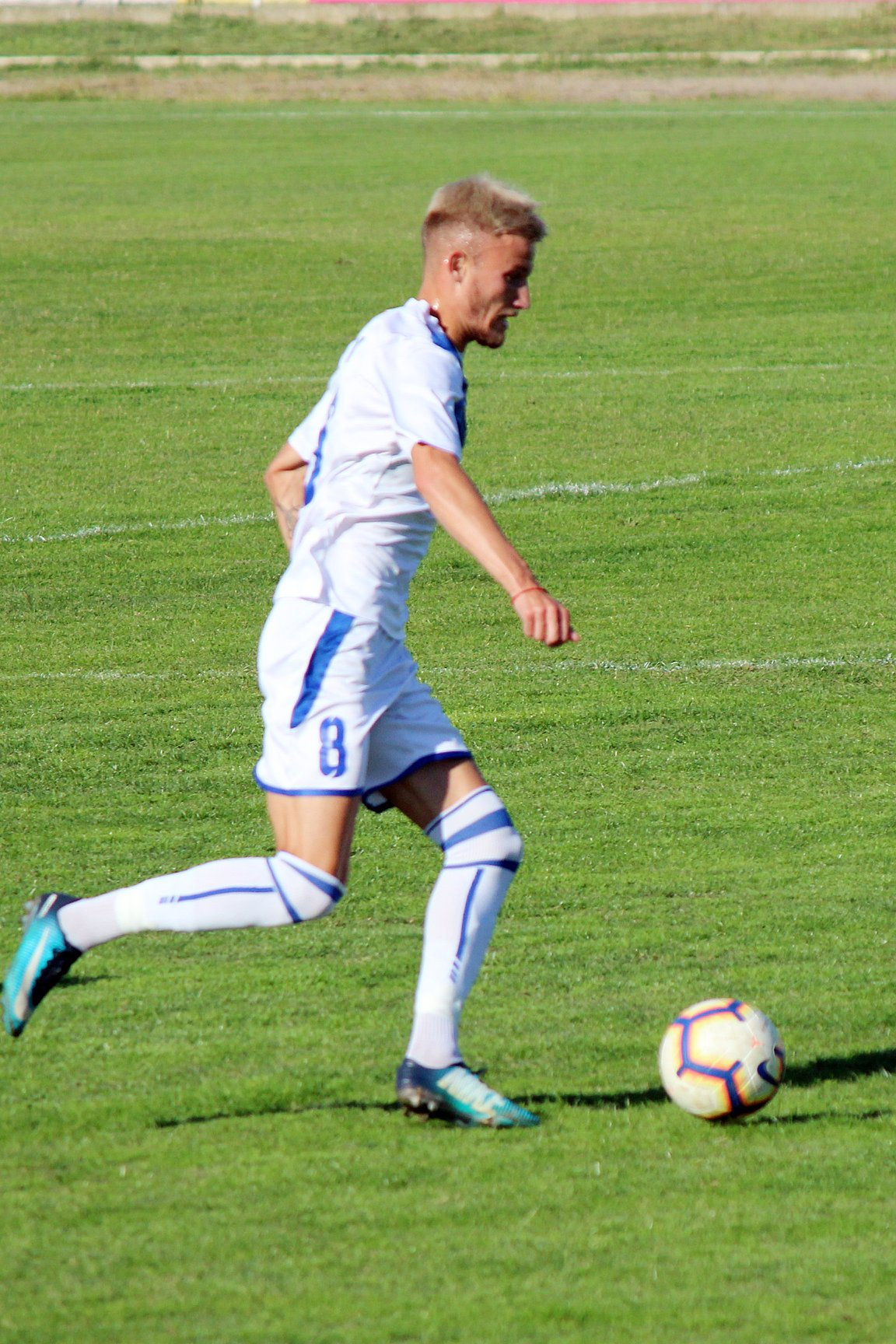

Personal information
- Full name: Gjorgi Stoilov
- Date of birth: 25 August 1995 (age 31)
- Place of birth: Strumica, North Macedonia
- Height: 1.87 m (6 ft 2 in)
- Position: Midfielder

Team information
- Current team: Bylis
- Number: 88

Senior career*
| Years | Team | Apps | (Gls) |
| 2012–2016 | Horizont Turnovo | 75 | (3) |
| 2016–2021 | Akademija Pandev | 107 | (9) |
| 2021–2022 | Zira | 5 | (0) |
| 2022 | Shkupi | 12 | (0) |
| 2022–2025 | Makedonija Gjorče Petrov | 59 | (3) |
| 2026– | Bylis | 12 | (3) |

International career^{‡}
| 2013 | Macedonia U19 | 1 | (0) |
| 2016 | Macedonia U21 | 1 | (0) |
| 2019– | North Macedonia | 2 | (0) |
- * Club domestic league appearances and goals as of 13 May 2026 ‡ National team caps and goals as of 19:37, 14 October 2019 (UTC)

Gjorgi Stoilov (Macedonian: Ѓорги Стоилов; born 25 August 1995) is a Macedonian footballer who plays as a midfielder for Bylis and the North Macedonia national team.

== International career ==
Stoilov made his international debut for North Macedonia on 13 October 2019 in a UEFA Euro 2020 qualifying match against Poland, which finished as a 0–2 away loss.

== Career statistics ==
=== International ===
As of 13 October 2019

North Macedonia
| Year | Apps | Goals |
|---|---|---|
| 2019 | 1 | 0 |
| Total | 1 | 0 |
