= Davit Volkovi =

Georgian footballer (born 1995)

Personal information
- Date of birth: 3 June 1995 (age 31)
- Place of birth: Tbilisi, Georgia
- Height: 1.85 m (6 ft 1 in)
- Position: Forward

Team information
- Current team: Zira
- Number: 9

Senior career*
Years	Team	Apps	(Gls)
2012–2013	Gagra	23	(10)
2013–2016	Dinamo Tbilisi	4	(0)
2013–2015	→ Dinamo Tbilisi II	23	(7)
2016	→ Chikhura Sachkhere (loan)	8	(4)
2016	→ Sioni Bolnisi (loan)	14	(6)
2017	Zemun	1	(1)
2017–2019	Saburtalo Tbilisi	40	(16)
2019	Gabala	27	(7)
2020–2022	Zira	58	(20)
2022–2024	Sabah	63	(16)
2024–	Zira	54	(17)

International career^{‡}
2021–	Georgia	6	(2)
- * Club domestic league appearances and goals as of 22 June 2026 ‡ National team caps and goals as of 25 March 2023

Davit Volkovi (Georgian: დავით ვოლკოვი; born 3 June 1995) is a Georgian professional footballer who plays as striker for Zira in the Azerbaijan Premier League.

== Club career ==
=== Georgia ===
Born in Georgian capital Tbilisi, Volkovi played the 2012–13 season with FC Gagra in the Georgian Premier League scoring 10 goals in 26 appearances. Being only 18 at the time, it was no surprise local power-house FC Dinamo Tbilisi brought him at the end of the season. Initially, he played mostly for the second team which was competing in second level, the Pirveli Liga. By the end of his second year at reserves team, he was incorporated to the first team in the second half of the 2014–15 season. He started the 2015–16 Umaglesi Liga as part of the main team and made 3 appearances as contribution for Dinamo Tbilisi winning their 16th national title, however the challenge for a spot in the starting eleven was huge with Dinamo having numerous experienced national team strikers, so during winter-break, Volkovi accepted a loan to FC Chikhura Sachkhere where he will play the second half of the season and score 4 goals in 8 appearances helping them finish 4th and qualify to the UEFA Europa League. Instead of spending most time sitting in the glorious Dinamo Tbilisi bench waiting to be the substitute of some glorious Georgian football star striker, Volkovi enjoyed being helpful and leading the attack in other teams where he would have more space, so for the restructured 2016 Umaglesi Liga he accepted being loaned to FC Sioni Bolnisi, a club that in the past had good results in the league. However, Sioni ended relegated, but Volkovi by scoring 6 goals in 14 games ended as 4th best league topscorer.

=== Serbia ===
At the end of the season he returned to Dinamo Tbilisi, and in February 2017 he accepted a permanent move abroad, to Serbia, to second-tier side FK Zemun. Zemun was by then in the winter-break of the 2016–17 Serbian First League season with good prospects of achieving promotion to the Serbian SuperLiga. It took Volkovi some time to debut, and it was in the last round, and he debuted by scoring a goal and with Zemun finishing second and achieving promotion to the 2017–18 Serbian SuperLiga.

=== Return to Georgia ===
After spending half a season at the bench in Serbian second tier, Volkovi was hungry of scoring goals. He had already demonstrated that when in the last round Zemun gave him a chance and he scored in his only league appearance. Zemun got the promotion, but with the uncertainty if he will receive a first team starter status or risk continuing on the bench, in summer 2017, Volkovi decided to return to Georgia and signed with top league side FC Saburtalo Tbilisi. He was a starter in the goalless first-round game against FC Kolkheti-1913 Poti but already in the second round Volkovi confirmed his goal-scoring skills and made a hattrick in a 6–0 victory against FC Locomotive Tbilisi.

=== Azerbaijan ===
On 11 January 2019, Volkovi signed for Gabala from Saburtalo Tbilisi on a one-year contract.

On 21 December 2019, Zira announced the singing of Volkovi on an 18-month contract starting 1 January 2020.

On 12 June 2022, Sabah announced the singing of Volkovi to a two-year contract.

On 13 June 2024, Zira announced the singing of Volkovi to a two-year contract.

== International career ==
He made his debut for Georgia national football team on 11 November 2021 in a World Cup qualifier against Sweden, a 2–0 home victory for Georgia. He scored his first international goal four days later, the only goal in a friendly 1–0 victory over Uzbekistan.

== Career statistics ==
=== Club ===
As of match played 1 September 2024

Appearances and goals by club, season and competition
Club	Season	League			Cup		Continental		Other		Total	
Club	Season	Division	Apps	Goals	Apps	Goals	Apps	Goals	Apps	Goals	Apps	Goals
Gagra	2012–13	Pirveli Liga	23	10	4	1	–		–		27	11
Dinamo Tbilisi	2013–14	Umaglesi Liga	0	0	0	0	–		–		0	0
Dinamo Tbilisi	2014–15	Umaglesi Liga	1	0	2	2	–		–		3	2
Dinamo Tbilisi	2015–16	Umaglesi Liga	3	0	1	0	0	0	–		4	0
Dinamo Tbilisi	2016	Umaglesi Liga	0	0	0	0	0	0	–		0	0
Dinamo Tbilisi	Total		4	0	3	2	0	0	0	0	7	2
Dinamo Tbilisi II (loan)	2013–14	Pirveli Liga	10	1	–		–		–		10	1
Dinamo Tbilisi II (loan)	2014–15	Pirveli Liga	13	6	–		–		–		13	6
Dinamo Tbilisi II (loan)	Total		23	7	0	0	0	0	0	0	23	7
Chikhura Sachkhere (loan)	2015–16	Umaglesi Liga	8	4	0	0	–		–		8	4
Sioni Bolnisi (loan)	2016	Umaglesi Liga	14	6	1	0	–		–		15	6
Zemun	2016–17	Serbian First League	1	1	0	0	–		–		1	1
Saburtalo Tbilisi	2017	Erovnuli Liga	17	10	0	0	–		–		17	10
Saburtalo Tbilisi	2018	Erovnuli Liga	28	8	0	0	–		–		28	8
Saburtalo Tbilisi	Total		45	18	0	0	0	0	0	0	45	18
Gabala	2018–19	Azerbaijan Premier League	13	2	3	1	0	0	–		16	3
Gabala	2019–20	Azerbaijan Premier League	14	5	2	2	2	0	–		18	7
Gabala	Total		27	7	5	3	2	0	0	0	34	10
Zira	2019–20	Azerbaijan Premier League	6	1	0	0	–		–		6	1
Zira	2020–21	Azerbaijan Premier League	24	8	5	2	–		–		29	10
Zira	2021–22	Azerbaijan Premier League	28	11	5	0	–		–		33	11
Zira	Total		58	20	10	2	0	0	0	0	68	22
Sabah	2022–23	Azerbaijan Premier League	35	10	3	2	–		–		38	12
Sabah	2023–24	Azerbaijan Premier League	28	6	1	0	4	1	–		33	7
Sabah	Total		63	16	4	2	4	1	0	0	71	19
Zira	2024–25	Azerbaijan Premier League	4	3	0	0	8	4	–		12	7
Career total			274	91	27	10	14	5	0	0	311	107

=== International ===
As of match played 17 November 2022

Appearances and goals by national team and year
National team	Year	Apps	Goals
Georgia	2021	2	1
Georgia	2022	2	0
Georgia	2023	1	1
Georgia	Total	5	2

As of match played 15 November 2021
Georgia score listed first, score column indicates score after each Volkovi goal

List of international goals scored by Davit Volkovi
No.	Date	Venue	Cap	Opponent	Score	Result	Competition	Ref.
1	15 November 2021	Tengiz Burjanadze Stadium, Gori, Georgia	2	Uzbekistan	1–0	1–0	Friendly	

== Honours ==
Dinamo Tbilisi

- Georgian Cup: 2015
- Georgian Super Cup: 2015

Gabala

- Azerbaijan Cup: 2018–19
