= Nemanja Anđelković =

Serbian footballer

Personal information
- Date of birth: 26 April 1997 (age 29)
- Place of birth: Kosovska Mitrovica, FR Yugoslavia
- Height: 1.88 m (6 ft 2 in)
- Position: Centre-back

Team information
- Current team: Qingdao Hainiu
- Number: 26

Senior career*
Years	Team	Apps	(Gls)
2015–2016	Mokra Gora	25	(1)
2016	Zlatibor Čajetina	12	(1)
2017	Radnik Surdulica	0	(0)
2017	ČSK Čelarevo	11	(2)
2018	Zlatibor Čajetina	36	(3)
2019–2020	Javor Ivanjica	10	(0)
2019–2020	→ Zlatibor Čajetina (loan)	24	(0)
2020	Metalac Gornji Milanovac	2	(0)
2020	Zlatibor Čajetina	14	(0)
2021–2023	Zira	55	(1)
2023–2024	Akron Tolyatti	30	(1)
2024	Khimki	7	(0)
2025	Aktobe	23	(1)
2026–	Qingdao Hainiu	21	(1)
- * Club domestic league appearances and goals as of 23 August 2026

Nemanja Anđelković (Serbian Cyrillic: Немања Анђелковић; born 26 April 1997) is a Serbian footballer who plays as a centre-back for Chinese Super League club Qingdao Hainiu.

== Career ==
On 8 July 2024, Anđelković signed with Khimki who returned to the Russian Premier League. In the previous season, he contributed to Akron Tolyatti also getting promotion to the RPL.

Anđelković made his RPL debut for Khimki on 21 July 2024 in a game against Dynamo Makhachkala. On 26 December 2024, he left Khimki by mutual consent.

== Career statistics ==
As of match played 23 August 2026

Appearances and goals by club, season and competition
Club	Season	League			Cup		Continental		Other		Total	
Club	Season	Division	Apps	Goals	Apps	Goals	Apps	Goals	Apps	Goals	Apps	Goals
Mokra Gora	2015–16	Serbian League West	25	1	1	0	—		—		26	1
Zlatibor Čajetina	2016–17	Serbian League West	12	1	0	0	—		—		12	1
Radnik Surdulica	2016–17	Serbian SuperLiga	0	0	0	0	—		—		0	0
ČSK Čelarevo	2017–18	Serbian First League	11	2	0	0	—		—		11	2
Zlatibor Čajetina	2017–18	Serbian League West	16	0	0	0	—		—		16	0
Zlatibor Čajetina	2018–19	Serbian First League	20	3	0	0	—		—		20	3
Zlatibor Čajetina	Total		36	3	0	0	—		—		36	3
Javor Ivanjica	2018–19	Serbian First League	10	0	—		—		—		10	0
Zlatibor Čajetina (loan)	2019–20	Serbian First League	24	0	1	0	—		—		25	0
Metalac Gornji Milanovac	2020–21	Serbian SuperLiga	2	0	0	0	—		—		2	0
Zlatibor Čajetina	2020–21	Serbian SuperLiga	14	0	1	0	—		—		15	0
Zira	2020–21	Azerbaijan Premier League	14	1	5	2	0	0	—		19	3
Zira	2021–22	Azerbaijan Premier League	15	0	3	0	0	0	—		18	0
Zira	2022–23	Azerbaijan Premier League	26	0	0	0	2 (Note: Appearances in UEFA Conference League)	0	—		28	0
Zira	Total		55	1	8	2	2	0	—		65	3
Akron Tolyatti	2023–24	Russian First League	30	1	1	0	—		2 (Note: Appearances in Promotion play-offs)	1	33	2
Khimki	2024–25	Russian Premier League	7	0	4	0	—		—		11	0
Aktobe	2025	Kazakhstan Premier League	23	1	1	0	4 (Note: Two appearances in UEFA Europa League, two appearances in UEFA Conference League)	0	1 (Note: Appearances in Kazakhstan Super Cup)	0	29	1
Qingdao Hainiu	2026	Chinese Super League	21	1	0	0	—		—		21	1
career total			270	11	17	2	6	0	3	1	296	14
