= Matheus Albino =

Brazilian footballer (born 1995)

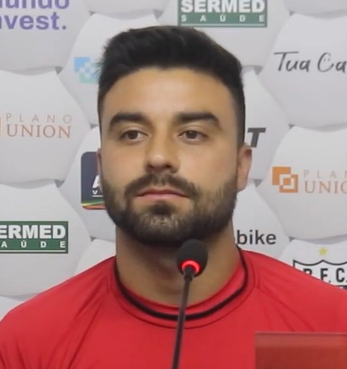
- Albino in 2022

Personal information
- Full name: Matheus Albino Carneiro
- Date of birth: 4 February 1995 (age 31)
- Place of birth: Curitiba, Brazil
- Height: 1.92 m (6 ft 4 in)
- Position: Goalkeeper

Team information
- Current team: CRB
- Number: 12

Youth career
- 2011–2013: Atlético Paranaense
- 2014–2015: Joinville

Senior career*
Years	Team	Apps	(Gls)
2016–2018	Joinville	46	(0)
2019–2020	Londrina	35	(0)
2020–2021	Zira	26	(0)
2022	Londrina	10	(0)
2023	Botafogo-SP	38	(0)
2024–	CRB	107	(0)
- * Club domestic league appearances and goals as of 16 November 2026

Matheus Albino Carneiro (born 4 February 1995) is a Brazilian professional footballer who plays as a goalkeeper for CRB.

== Career ==
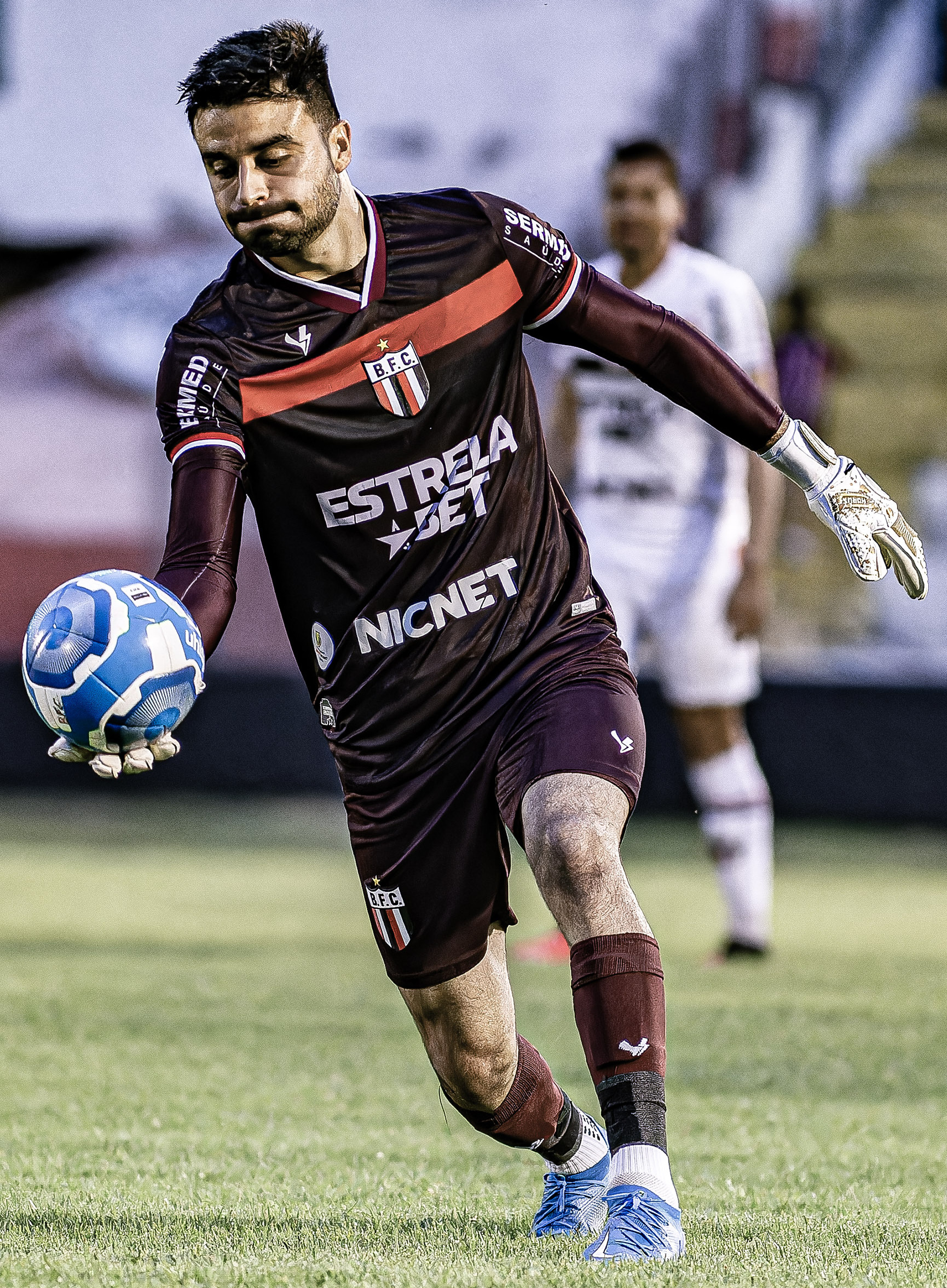
Albino playing for Botafogo-SP in 2023

Born in Curitiba, Paraná, Albino played for the youth sides of Atlético Paranaense and Joinville. He was promoted to the first team ahead of the 2016 season, but did not feature during the entire year.

Albino made his senior debut on 9 February 2017, starting in a 2–0 away loss to Atlético Mineiro, for the year's Primeira Liga. On 21 March, he renewed his contract with the club until 2019.

In November 2018, after losing his starting spot, Albino signed a two-year contract with Londrina. He started the 2019 campaign as a backup to Alan, but later became a starter as the club suffered relegation.

Albino rescinded with LEC on 27 August 2020, and moved abroad on 1 September, signing a two-year contract with Zira FK in Azerbaijan. On 27 May 2021, Zira announced that he had left the club.

On 6 January 2022, after more than seven months without a club, Albino returned to Londrina. A backup to Matheus Nogueira, he moved to fellow Série B side Botafogo-SP on 18 November.

On 4 December 2023, despite being a first-choice during most of the 2023 Série B, Albino was released by Botafogo. Three days later, he moved to CRB.

On 18 July 2025, Albino renewed his contract with CRB until the end of 2028.

== Career statistics ==
As of 28 May 2025

Appearances and goals by club, season and competition
Club	Season	League			State league		National cup (Note: Includes Copa do Brasil, Azerbaijan Cup)		Other		Total	
Club	Season	Division	Apps	Goals	Apps	Goals	Apps	Goals	Apps	Goals	Apps	Goals
Joinville	2016	Série B	0	0	0	0	0	0	—		0	0
Joinville	2017	Série C	15	0	9 (Note: Appearance(s) in Campeonato Catarinense)	0	5	0	5 (Note: One appearance in Primeira Liga, four appearances in Copa Santa Catarina)	0	34	0
Joinville	2018	Série C	11	0	11	0	2	0	0	0	24	0
Joinville	Total		26	0	20	0	7	0	5	0	58	0
Londrina	2019	Série B	21	0	2 (Note: Appearance(s) in Campeonato Paranaense)	0	3	0	—		26	0
Londrina	2020	Série C	0	0	12	0	1	0	—		13	0
Londrina	Total		21	0	14	0	4	0	—		39	0
Zira	2020–21	Azerbaijan Premier League	26	0	—		4	0	—		30	0
Londrina	2022	Série B	7	0	3	0	0	0	—		10	0
Botafogo-SP	2023	Série B	31	0	7 (Note: Appearance(s) in Campeonato Paulista)	0	4	0	—		42	0
CRB	2024	Série B	36	0	7 (Note: Appearance(s) in Campeonato Alagoano)	0	6	0	12 (Note: Appearance(s) in Copa do Nordeste)	0	61	0
CRB	2025	Série B	9	0	10	0	2	0	6	0	27	0
CRB	Total		45	0	17	0	8	0	18	0	88	0
Career total			156	0	61	0	27	0	23	0	267	0

== Honours ==
CRB

- Campeonato Alagoano: 2024, 2025
