= Caio Rangel =

Brazilian footballer (born 1996)

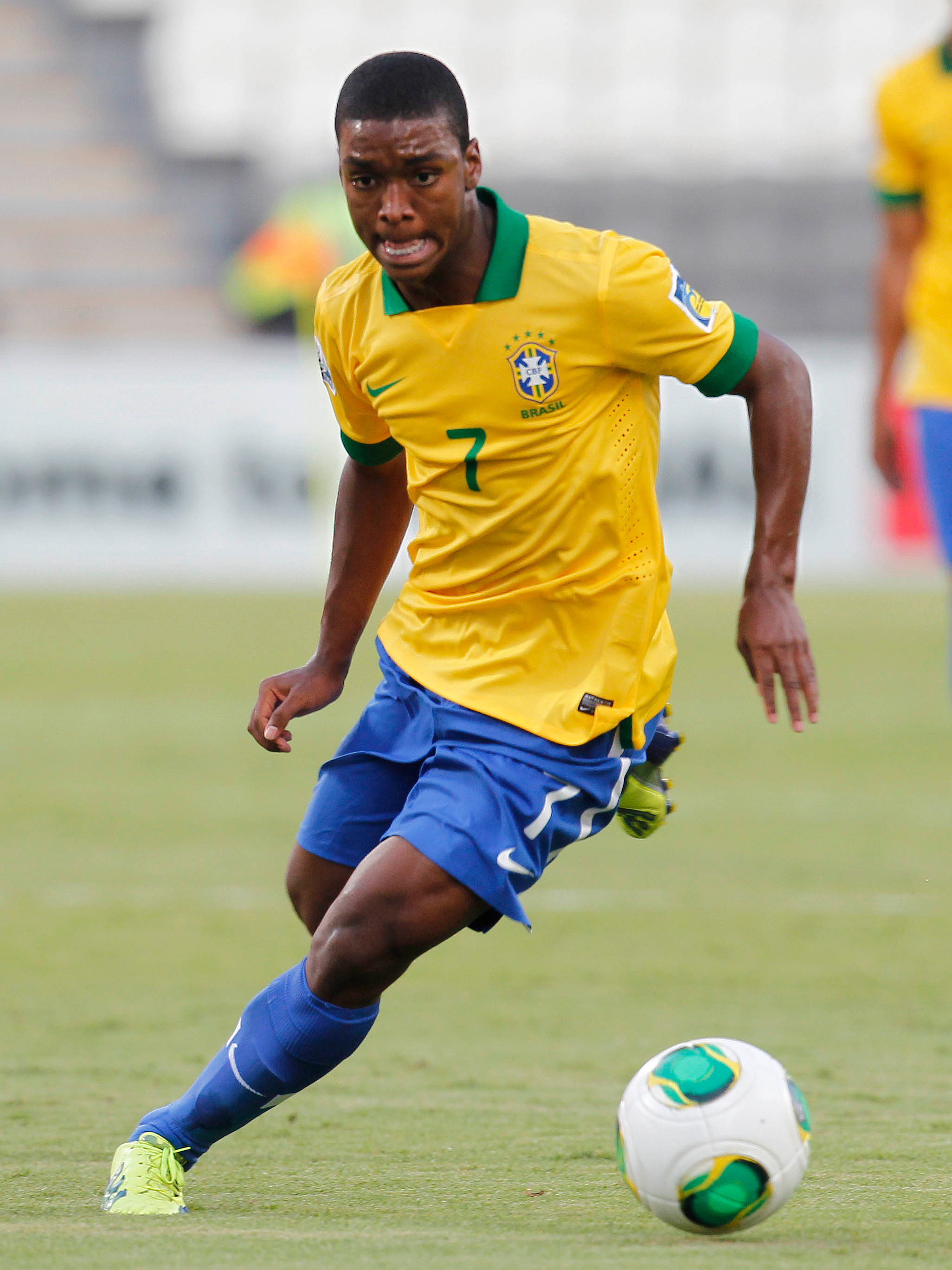

Personal information
- Full name: Caio Rangel da Silva
- Date of birth: 16 January 1996 (age 30)
- Place of birth: Rio de Janeiro, Brazil
- Height: 1.72 m (5 ft 8 in)
- Position: Right winger

Youth career
- Flamengo

Senior career*
Years	Team	Apps	(Gls)
2014–2017	Cagliari	8	(0)
2015–2016	→ Arouca (loan)	2	(0)
2016–2017	→ Cruzeiro (loan)	0	(0)
2017	→ Criciúma (loan)	41	(3)
2018	Juventude	18	(1)
2018–2019	Paraná	9	(0)
2019	São Bento	24	(2)
2020	Ferroviária	6	(1)
2021	Zira	3	(0)
2021	Santo André	8	(1)
2021	Brasil de Pelotas	15	(0)
2022	Chapecoense	9	(0)

International career
2010	Brazil U14		
2013	Brazil U17	8	(3)
- * Club domestic league appearances and goals as of 19:10, 5 June 2022 (UTC)

Caio Rangel da Silva (born 16 January 1996) is a Brazilian professional footballer who plays for Chapecoense as a right winger.

== Club career ==
Rangel joined the youth academy of Flamengo when he was 11 years old. Before joining, he scored 50 goals in a football tournament at Rio de Janeiro. Though he had a contract with Flamengo till February 2015, he signed a four-year professional contract with Italian club Cagliari in January 2014. Flamengo tried to renew his contract, but it went in vain, but secured "5% on the future sale" of Rangel. He commented "No one knows what is the right time to leave the country, but I have to think of me and my family. This weighs heavily in the decision. I thank all the professionals, because I learned a lot here. The crowd is wonderful and one day I want back and give joy to the nation, " He made his league debut against Sampdoria. In that match, he came as a 67th-minute substitute for Albin Ekdal. He played his second league match against Napoli, where he came as a 90th-minute substitute for Víctor Ibarbo. He made his Coppa Italia debut against Catania coming as a 56th-minute substitute for Brazilian goalscorer Diego Farias. He started for his club for the first time against Modena in the same competition, only to be later substituted by Farias. However it was reported in January 2015, that he was to be sold by his club as he became surplus.

On 29 January 2019 it was confirmed, that Rangel had joined Paraná Clube.

On 16 August 2020, Rangel signed a 1+1 year contract with Zira FK. Four months later, on 16 December 2020, Rangel left Zira by mutual consent.

== Career statistics ==
As of 20 March 2015

Club	Season	League			Cup		Other		Total	
Club	Season	Division	Apps	Goals	Apps	Goals	Apps	Goals	Apps	Goals
Cagliari	2014–15	Serie A	6	0	2	0	0	0	8	0
Career total			6	0	2	0	0	0	8	0

== International career ==
Rangel played for the Brazil under-14 team in 2010. He played 14 times for Brazil under 17 scoring 3 goals in 2013. The first goal was scored against Peru under 17, which was followed by his two goals in 2013 FIFA U-17 World Cup, once against Slovakia under 17 and again against Honduras under 17.

== Personal life ==
In November 2010, Rangel's house in Complexo do Alemão was raided by military police in action against local violence. He lived in that house with his parents Robert and Adenilda.
