= Rodrigue Bongongui =

Cameroonian footballer (born 1993)

Personal information
- Full name: Louis Marie Rodrigue Bongongui Assougou
- Date of birth: 7 February 1993 (age 33)
- Place of birth: Yaoundé, Cameroon
- Height: 1.66 m (5 ft 5 in)
- Position: Winger

Youth career
- 2001–2008: AS Bondy
- 2008–2011: Sedan

Senior career*
Years	Team	Apps	(Gls)
2011–2013	Sedan	9	(0)
2011–2013	Sedan B	18	(7)
2013–2017	Paris FC	90	(6)
2014–2017	Paris FC B	13	(3)
2017–2018	Les Herbiers VF	32	(3)
2018–2019	Slaven Belupo	22	(1)
2019–2020	Tabor Sežana	29	(4)
2020–2021	Hapoel Hadera	18	(0)
2021	Zira FK	10	(0)
2021–2022	Tabor Sežana	25	(4)
2022–2023	Maccabi Ahi Nazareth	34	(3)
- * Club domestic league appearances and goals as of 1 September 2023

Rodrigue Bongongui (born 7 February 1993) is a Cameroonian professional footballer who plays as a winger.

Bongongui was part of the Les Herbiers VF squad that reached the 2018 Coupe de France final as a third-tier club. He has also played professional football in Croatia, Slovenia, Israel and Azerbaijan.

== Honours ==
Les Herbiers

- Coupe de France runner-up: 2017–18
