= Turan Valizade =

Azerbaijani footballer (born 2001)

Personal information
- Full name: Turan Nasimi oglu Valizade
- Date of birth: 1 January 2001 (age 25)
- Place of birth: Julfa, Azerbaijan
- Height: 1.77 m (5 ft 10 in)
- Position: Midfielder

Team information
- Current team: Sabail (on loan from Araz-Naxçıvan)
- Number: 14

Youth career
- 2009–2011: Neftçi Baku
- 2011–2015: Alinja
- 2015–2016: Fenerbahçe
- 2017–2018: Qarabağ

Senior career*
Years	Team	Apps	(Gls)
2019–2024	Neftçi Baku	2	(0)
2020–2022	→ Keşla (loan)	38	(1)
2022–2023	→ Turan Tovuz (loan)	26	(1)
2024–	Araz-Naxçıvan	1	(0)
2025–	→ Sabail (loan)	9	(0)

International career^{‡}
2016–2017	Azerbaijan U17	6	(2)
2018–2019	Azerbaijan U19	9	(0)
2020–2021	Azerbaijan U21	10	(0)
- * Club domestic league appearances and goals as of 27 November 2025 ‡ National team caps and goals as of 4 May 2023

Turan Valizade (Azerbaijani: Turan Vəlizadə; born on 1 January 2001) is an Azerbaijani professional footballer who plays as a midfielder for Azerbaijan First League club Sabail on loan from Araz-Naxçıvan.

== Club career ==
On 5 May 2019, Valizade made his debut in the Azerbaijan Premier League for Neftçi Baku match against Gabala.

On 21 July 2020, Keşla FK announced the signing of Valizade on one-year long loan.
