= Lazar Đorđević =

Serbian footballer

Personal information
- Full name: Lazar Đorđević
- Date of birth: 14 July 1992 (age 34)
- Place of birth: Vranje, SFR Yugoslavia
- Height: 1.87 m (6 ft 2 in)
- Positions: Left-back; centre-back

Team information
- Current team: Al-Riffa
- Number: 12

Youth career
- Palilulac Beograd

Senior career*
| Years | Team | Apps | (Gls) |
| 2010–2012 | Palilulac Beograd | | |
| 2012–2013 | Sileks | 29 | (0) |
| 2013–2015 | Košice | 44 | (3) |
| 2014–2015 | → MFK Košice B | 12 | (2) |
| 2016–2018 | Železiarne Podbrezová | 69 | (3) |
| 2018 | Vojvodina | 7 | (0) |
| 2019 | Karviná | 7 | (0) |
| 2019–2020 | Radnički Niš | 20 | (3) |
| 2020–2021 | Zira | 18 | (1) |
| 2021– | Al-Khaldiya | | |
| 2022–2023 | Radnički Niš | 1 | (0) |
| 2023– | Al-Riffa | | |
- * Club domestic league appearances and goals as of 05:00, 16 December 2021 (UTC)

Lazar Đorđević (Serbian Cyrillic: Лазар Ђорђевић; also transliterated Lazar Djordjević; born 14 July 1992) is a Serbian football player who plays for Al-Riffa in the Bahraini Premier League.

== Career ==
=== MFK Košice ===
Born in Vranje, Lazar Đorđević joined MFK Košice in summer 2013. On 14 September 2013, he made his debut for MFK Košice, playing thirty-one minutes in a 4–1 home win against FK DAC 1904 Dunajská Streda.

=== Vojvodina ===
On 4 July 2018, Đorđević signed a two-year deal with Vojvodina. On 18 December 2018 Đorđević and Vojvodina reached an agreement to mutually terminate the contract.

=== MFK Karviná ===
On 3 January 2019, Đorđević joined Czech club MFK Karviná. However, the deal was first completed on 29 January 2019.

=== Zira FK ===
On 29 July 2020, Đorđević signed a two-year contract with Zira FK.
