= Rashad Azizli =

Azerbaijani footballer (born 1994)

Rashad Azizli Rəşad Əzizli
Personal information
- Full name: Rashad Faig oglu Azizli
- Date of birth: 1 January 1994 (age 32)
- Place of birth: Baku, Azerbaijan
- Height: 1.85 m (6 ft 1 in)
- Position: Goalkeeper

Team information
- Current team: Sabail
- Number: 1

Youth career
- 2009–2011: Keşla
- 2011–2013: Neftçi Baku
- 2013–2015: Simurq

Senior career*
Years	Team	Apps	(Gls)
2016	Ravan Baku	16	(0)
2016	Shuvalan	2	(0)
2017	Sabail	0	(0)
2017–2018	Neftçi Baku	17	(2)
2019	Sumgayit	7	(0)
2019–2020	Keşla	0	(0)
2020–2022	Zira	2	(0)
2022	Neftçi Baku	0	(0)
2022	→ Sabail (loan)	9	(0)
2022–2023	Shamakhi	30	(0)
2023–2024	Gabala	20	(0)
2024–2025	Sumgayit	0	(0)
2025–	Sabail	11	(0)

International career^{‡}
2010	Azerbaijan U17	3	(0)
2011	Azerbaijan U19	1	(0)
- * Club domestic league appearances and goals as of 18 December 2025 ‡ National team caps and goals as of 11 October 2024

Rashad Faig oglu Azizli (Azerbaijani: Rəşad Əzizli; born on 1 January 1994) is an Azerbaijani professional footballer who plays as a goalkeeper for Sabail in the Azerbaijan First League.

== Club career ==
On 31 January 2016, Azizli made his debut in the Azerbaijan Premier League for Ravan Baku match against Khazar Lankaran.

On 19 July 2020, Azizli signed one-year contract with Zira FK.

On 25 July 2024, Gabala announced the signing of Azizli from Shamakhi to a one-year contract.

On 27 September 2024, he signed a contract with Sumgayit to the end of the season.

== Personal life ==
Azizli is the son of former Azerbaijani goalkeeper Faig Azizov.
