= Tural Bayramlı =

Azerbaijani footballer (born 1998)

Personal information
- Full name: Tural Mayıl oğlu Bayramlı
- Date of birth: 7 January 1998 (age 28)
- Place of birth: Sumgayit, Azerbaijan
- Height: 1.77 m (5 ft 10 in)
- Position: Midfielder

Senior career*
Years	Team	Apps	(Gls)
2016–2018	Sumgayit	2	(0)
2019	Daugavpils	12	(0)
2019–2020	Keşla	19	(2)
2020–2021	Zira	16	(0)
2021	Pierikos	0	(0)
2022–2023	Sabail	12	(0)
2023–2024	Araz-Naxçıvan	30	(0)
2024–2026	Turan Tovuz	8	(0)

International career^{‡}
2016	Azerbaijan U19	1	(0)
2018	Azerbaijan U20	1	(0)
2019	Azerbaijan U21	2	(0)
- * Club domestic league appearances and goals as of 21 June 2026 ‡ National team caps and goals as of 20 September 2020

Tural Mayıl oğlu Bayramlı (born 7 January 1998) is an Azerbaijani professional footballer who plays as a midfielder.

== Club career ==
On 25 October 2016, Bayramlı made his debut in the Azerbaijan Premier League for Sumgayit in a 2–2 draw against Gabala.

On 19 July 2020, Bayramlı signed a one-year contract with Zira FK.

On 15 September, Bayramlı signed a one-year contract with S.F.K. Pierikos.

On 24 June 2024, Turan Tovuz signed a two-season contract with Tural Bayramli. On 20 June 2026, the club announced that they had parted ways with the player.
