= Dimitrios Chantakias =

Greek professional footballer

Personal information
- Date of birth: 4 January 1995 (age 31)
- Place of birth: Agrinio, Greece
- Height: 1.84 m (6 ft 0 in)
- Position: Centre-back

Team information
- Current team: Omonia 29M
- Number: 44

Youth career
- Medeon Katounas
- 2012–2014: Panetolikos

Senior career*
Years	Team	Apps	(Gls)
2014–2019	Panetolikos	48	(1)
2015	→ Fokikos (loan)	10	(0)
2019	→ Kerkyra (loan)	9	(0)
2019–2020	Cherno More	22	(1)
2020–2024	Zira	108	(6)
2024–2025	Panserraikos	8	(0)
2025	Lamia	11	(0)
2025–2026	Flamurtari	27	(1)
2026–	Omonia 29M	4	(1)
- * Club domestic league appearances and goals as of 18 September 2026

Dimitrios Chantakias (Greek: Δημήτριος Χαντάκιας; born 4 January 1995) is a Greek professional footballer who plays as a centre-back for Cypriot First Division club Omonia 29M.

== Career ==
=== Panetolikos and loan spells ===
Chantakias started his career at Panetolikos, signing his first professional contract in the summer of 2014.

In January 2015, he was sent on loan at Fokikos until the end of the season. He made his professional debut on 1 February 2015, in a 1–0 away loss against Lamia, playing full 90 minutes. After making ten appearances for the club, it announced that Chantakias would return to his parent club in June 2015.

He made his Panetolikos debut in a match against Atromitos on 7 December 2015, coming on as a substitute in the 72nd minute.

=== Cherno More ===
On 28 June 2019, Chantakias joined Bulgarian club Cherno More Varna.

=== Zira ===
On 5 September 2020, Chantakias signed a one-year contract with Zira FK.

=== Lamia ===
On February 5, 2025, he signed a contract with Super League Greece club Lamia.
