= Hacıağa Hacılı =

Azerbaijani footballer (born 1998)

Personal information
- Full name: Hacıağa Habil oğlu Hacılı
- Date of birth: 30 January 1998 (age 28)
- Place of birth: Ağdam, Azerbaijan
- Height: 1.77 m (5 ft 9 1/2 in)
- Position: Defensive midfielder

Team information
- Current team: Zira
- Number: 6

Youth career
- Gabala

Senior career*
Years	Team	Apps	(Gls)
2018	Gabala	3	(0)
2018	→ Qarabağ (loan)	2	(0)
2019–2023	Qarabağ	9	(0)
2020–2023	→ Zira (loan)	74	(0)
2023–	Zira	37	(0)

International career^{‡}
2014–2015	Azerbaijan U17	5	(0)
2016	Azerbaijan U19	3	(0)
2018–2020	Azerbaijan U21	17	(0)
- * Club domestic league appearances and goals as of 22 June 2026 ‡ National team caps and goals as of 20 September 2020

Hacıağa Habil oğlu Hacılı (born on 30 January 1998) is an Azerbaijani footballer who plays as a midfielder for Zira in the Azerbaijan Premier League and the Azerbaijan U21.

== Club career ==
Hacılı made his debut in the Azerbaijan Premier League for Gabala on 24 February 2018, match against Sabail.

In January 2019, Hacılı signed a four-years contract with Qarabağ.

On 1 August 2020, Zira FK announced the signing of Hacılı on one-year long loan.

== Honours ==
Qarabağ

- Azerbaijan Premier League (2): 2018–19, 2019–20
