= 2021–22 Sumgayit FK season =

Sumgayit
2021-22 season
- Chairman: Riad Rafiyev
- Manager: Aykhan Abbasov (until 16 December); Alyaksey Baha (from 30 December)
- Stadium: Kapital Bank Arena
- Premier League: 7th
- Azerbaijan Cup: Quarterfinal vs Gabala
- UEFA Europa Conference League: Second qualifying round vs Čukarički
- Top goalscorer: League: Two Players (5); All: Two Players (5)
| Home colours | Away colours |

The Sumgayit FK 2021–22 season was Sumgayit's eleventh Azerbaijan Premier League season, and twelfth season in their history.

== Season events ==
On 14 June, Sumgayit announced the signing of Yusif Nabiyev from Gabala on a one-year contract with the option of an additional year. The following day, 15 June, Sumgayit announced the permanent signing of Eltun Turabov from Sabah to a one-year contract after he'd previously played for Sumgayit on loan the previous season.

On 18 June, Tarlan Ahmadli returned to Sumgayit on a one-year contract from Gabala. On 25 June, Sumgayit announced their third signing of the summer from Gabala, with Roman Huseynov joining on a one-year contract.

On 17 September, Sumgayit announced the signing of Saeid Bagherpasand to a one-year contract, from Aluminium Arak.

On 16 December, Aykhan Abbasov left his role as Head Coach of Sumgayit. On 30 December, Alyaksey Baha was appointed as the new Head Coach of Sumgayit on a 2.5year contract.

On 6 January, Roman Huseynov and Saeid Bagherpasand where released by the club, with Vugar Beybalayev signing from Telavi the following day to a 2.5-year contract.

On 11 January, Sumgayit announced the signing of Elshan Abdullayev after he'd left Sabail.

On 15 January, Sumgayit announced the signing of Araz Abdullayev from Ethnikos Achna on a contract until the end of the season, with the option of an additional two-years.

== Squad ==
As of match played 21 May 2022

| No. | Name | Nationality | Position | Date of birth (age) | Signed from | Signed in | Contract ends | Apps. | Goals |
Goalkeepers
| 1 | Tarlan Ahmadli | (Azerbaijan) | GK | 21 November 1994 (aged 27) | Gabala | 2021 | 2022 | 22 | 0 |
| 13 | Aydin Bayramov | (Azerbaijan) | GK | 18 February 1996 (aged 26) | Neftchi Baku | 2019 | | 33 | 0 |
| 23 | Andrey Popovich | (Azerbaijan) | GK | 4 March 1992 (aged 30) | LNZ Cherkasy | 2022 | | 68 | 0 |
| 25 | Ilnur Valiev | (Russia) | GK | 25 June 2003 (aged 18) | Academy | 2021 | | 0 | 0 |
Defenders
| 2 | Dmitri Naghiyev | (Azerbaijan) | DF | 27 November 1995 (aged 26) | Dinamo-Auto Tiraspol | 2021 | 2023 | 38 | 0 |
| 3 | Vurğun Hüseynov | (Azerbaijan) | DF | 25 April 1988 (aged 34) | Gabala | 2013 | | 214 | 2 |
| 4 | Hojjat Haghverdi | (Azerbaijan) | DF | 3 February 1993 (aged 29) | Paykan | 2021 | | 49 | 1 |
| 5 | Dzhamaldin Khodzhaniyazov | (Russia) | DF | 18 July 1996 (aged 25) | BATE Borisov | 2019 | | 75 | 4 |
| 14 | Elvin Badalov | (Azerbaijan) | DF | 14 June 1995 (aged 26) | Sabah | 2019 | | 63 | 1 |
| 30 | Nabi Mammadov | (Azerbaijan) | DF | 20 August 1999 (aged 22) | Academy | 2020 | | 4 | 0 |
| 74 | Yusif Nabiyev | (Azerbaijan) | DF | 3 September 1997 (aged 24) | Gabala | 2021 | 2022 (+1) | 33 | 3 |
| 98 | Emil Aliyev | (Azerbaijan) | DF | 9 August 1998 (aged 23) | Keşla | 2021 | | 1 | 0 |
| | Arsen Agjabayov | (Azerbaijan) | DF | 11 September 2000 (aged 21) | loan from Sabah | 2022 | 2022 | 0 | 0 |
Midfielders
| 6 | Vugar Mustafayev | (Azerbaijan) | MF | 5 August 1994 (aged 27) | Zira | 2019 | | 78 | 0 |
| 7 | Tellur Mutallimov | (Azerbaijan) | MF | 8 April 1995 (aged 27) | Zira | 2020 | | 56 | 4 |
| 8 | Sabuhi Abdullazade | (Azerbaijan) | MF | 18 December 2001 (aged 19) | Academy | 2017 | | 59 | 1 |
| 10 | Rahim Sadikhov | (Azerbaijan) | MF | 18 July 1996 (aged 25) | Torpedo Moscow | 2019 | | 79 | 19 |
| 11 | Rufat Abdullazade | (Azerbaijan) | MF | 17 January 2001 (aged 21) | Academy | 2017 | | 55 | 0 |
| 15 | Vugar Beybalayev | (Azerbaijan) | MF | 5 August 1993 (aged 28) | Telavi | 2022 | 2024 | 33 | 1 |
| 17 | Murad Khachayev | (Azerbaijan) | MF | 14 April 1998 (aged 24) | Shakhtar Donetsk | 2019 | | 66 | 5 |
| 18 | Suleyman Ahmadov | (Azerbaijan) | MF | 25 November 1999 (aged 22) | Qarabağ | 2018 | | 72 | 2 |
| 24 | Elshan Abdullayev | (Azerbaijan) | MF | 5 February 1994 (aged 28) | Sabail | 2022 | 2024 | 25 | 1 |
| 33 | Eltun Turabov | (Azerbaijan) | MF | 18 February 1997 (aged 25) | Sabah | 2021 | 2022 | 26 | 0 |
| 60 | Elvin Mammadov | (Azerbaijan) | MF | 18 July 1988 (aged 33) | Zira | 2020 | 2021 | 53 | 2 |
| 78 | Araz Abdullayev | (Azerbaijan) | MF | 18 April 1992 (aged 30) | Ethnikos Achna | 2022 | 2022 (+2) | 13 | 2 |
Forwards
| 9 | Ali Ghorbani | (Azerbaijan) | FW | 18 September 1990 (aged 31) | Sepahan | 2020 | 2021 (+1) | 52 | 15 |
| 19 | Khazar Mahmudov | (Azerbaijan) | FW | 23 November 2000 (aged 21) | Keşla | 2021 | | 16 | 0 |
| 55 | Ibrahim Aliyev | (Azerbaijan) | FW | 17 July 1999 (aged 22) | Neftçi | 2022 | | 4 | 0 |
| 91 | Anatoliy Nuriyev | (Azerbaijan) | FW | 20 May 1996 (aged 26) | Kolos Kovalivka | 2022 | | 5 | 1 |
Away on loan
Left during the season
| 20 | Roman Huseynov | (Azerbaijan) | MF | 26 December 1997 (aged 24) | Gabala | 2021 | 2022 | 4 | 0 |
| 23 | Saeid Bagherpasand | (Iran) | FW | 26 March 1991 (aged 31) | Aluminium Arak | 2021 | 2022 | 11 | 1 |
| 71 | Huseynali Guliyev | (Azerbaijan) | GK | 11 August 1999 (aged 22) | Sabah | 2020 | | 0 | 0 |

=== Out on loan ===
Note: Flags indicate national team as defined under FIFA eligibility rules; some limited exceptions apply. Players may hold more than one non-FIFA nationality.

| No. / Pos. / Nation / Player | No. / Pos. / Nation / Player |

== Transfers ==
=== In ===
| Date | Position | Nationality | Name | From | Fee | Ref. |
|---|---|---|---|---|---|---|
| 14 June 2021 | DF | (Azerbaijan) | Yusif Nabiyev | Gabala | Free | |
| 15 June 2021 | MF | (Azerbaijan) | Eltun Turabov | Sabah | Undisclosed | |
| 18 June 2021 | GK | (Azerbaijan) | Tarlan Ahmadli | Gabala | Undisclosed | |
| 25 June 2021 | MF | (Azerbaijan) | Roman Huseynov | Gabala | Free | |
| 1 July 2021 | FW | (Azerbaijan) | Khazar Mahmudov | Keşla | Undisclosed | |
| 17 September 2021 | FW | (Iran) | Saeid Bagherpasand | Aluminium Arak | Undisclosed | |
| 7 January 2022 | MF | (Azerbaijan) | Vugar Beybalayev | Telavi | Undisclosed | |
| 11 January 2022 | MF | (Azerbaijan) | Elshan Abdullayev | Sabail | Undisclosed | |
| 15 January 2022 | MF | (Azerbaijan) | Araz Abdullayev | Ethnikos Achna | Undisclosed | |
| 2 April 2022 | GK | (Azerbaijan) | Andrey Popovich | LNZ Cherkasy | Undisclosed | |

=== Loans in ===
| Date from | Position | Nationality | Name | From | Date to | Ref. |
|---|---|---|---|---|---|---|
| 3 January 2022 | DF | (Azerbaijan) | Arsen Agjabayov | Sabah | End of season | |

=== Out ===
| Date | Position | Nationality | Name | To | Fee | Ref. |
|---|---|---|---|---|---|---|
| 5 February 2022 | GK | (Azerbaijan) | Huseynali Guliyev | Sabail | Undisclosed | |

=== Released ===
| Date | Position | Nationality | Name | Joined | Date | Ref |
|---|---|---|---|---|---|---|
| 6 January 2022 | MF | (Azerbaijan) | Roman Huseynov | Kapaz | | |
| 6 January 2022 | FW | (Iran) | Saeid Bagherpasand | Zob Ahan Esfahan | 6 February 2022 | |

== Friendlies ==
| 30 June 2021 | Qarabağ | 3 – 1 | Sumgayit | Baku |
| 18:30 AZT (UTC+4) | Goal | Report | Sadikhov | Stadium: Azersun Arena |

| 5 July 2021 | Keçiörengücü (Turkey) | 2 – 1 | (Azerbaijan) Sumgayit | Turkey |
| AZT (UTC+4) | I.Djibrilla 28'; T.Yünkuş 45+1' | Report | Naghiyev 71' |

| 10 July 2021 | Sivasspor (Turkey) | 2 – 0 | (Azerbaijan) Sumgayit | Turkey |
| AZT (UTC+4) | Yatabaré 50' (pen.); Yılmaz 71' | Report |

| 14 July 2021 | Gaziantep (Turkey) | 2 – 1 | (Turkey) Sumgayit | Turkey |
| AZT (UTC+4) | | | Mahmudov 84' |

| 15 July 2021 | Sumgayit (Azerbaijan) | 0 – 2 | (Romania) Petrolul Ploiești | Turkey |
| AZT (UTC+4) |

| 7 August 2021 | Sumgayit | 1 – 0 | Zira | Sumgait |
| AZT (UTC+4) | Ghorbani 59' | Report | | Stadium: Kapital Bank Arena |

| 29 August 2021 | Keşla | 3 – 2 | Sumgayit | Baku |
| AZT (UTC+4) | Abang 34'; Yunanov 66', 75' | Report | Mammadov 42' (pen.); Mahmudov 72' | Stadium: ASK Arena |

| 4 September 2021 | Sabah | 1 – 0 | Sumgayit | Masazır |
| AZT (UTC+4) | Ceballos (pen.) | Report | | Stadium: Bank Respublika Arena |

| 15 January 2022 | Sumgayit (Azerbaijan) | 0 – 0 | (Poland) Jagiellonia Białystok | Belek, Turkey |
| AZT (UTC+4) | | Report |

| 19 January 2022 | Sumgayit (Azerbaijan) | 2 – 5 | (Germany) Berliner AK 07 | Belek, Turkey |
| AZT (UTC+4) | Mutallimov; Khachayev | Report | Goal |

| 22 January 2022 | Sumgayit (Azerbaijan) | 1 – 2 | (North Macedonia) Shkupi | Belek, Turkey |
| AZT (UTC+4) | Goal | Report | Goal |

== Competitions ==
=== Overview ===
| Competition | First match | Last match | Starting round | Final position | Record | | | | | | | |
| Competition | First match | Last match | Starting round | Final position | Pld | W | D | L | GF | GA | GD | Win % |
|---|---|---|---|---|---|---|---|---|---|---|---|---|
| Premier League | 14 August 2021 | 21 May 2022 | Matchday 1 | 6th | 28 | 5 | 7 | 16 | 22 | 46 | −24 | 17.86 |
| Azerbaijan Cup | 2 February 2022 | 13 February 2022 | Quarterfinal | Quarterfinal | 2 | 0 | 1 | 1 | 1 | 2 | −1 | 0.00 |
| UEFA Europa Conference League | 21 July 2021 | 29 July 2021 | Second Qualifying Round | Second Qualifying Round | 2 | 0 | 1 | 1 | 0 | 2 | −2 | 0.00 |
| Total | | | | | 32 | 5 | 9 | 18 | 23 | 50 | −27 | 15.63 |

Last updated: 21 May 2022
Source: Competitions

=== Premier League ===
==== Results summary ====
| Overall | | | | | | | | Home | | | | | | Away | | | | | |
| Pld | W | D | L | GF | GA | GD | Pts | W | D | L | GF | GA | GD | W | D | L | GF | GA | GD |
|---|---|---|---|---|---|---|---|---|---|---|---|---|---|---|---|---|---|---|---|
| 29 | 5 | 8 | 16 | 22 | 46 | −24 | 23 | 4 | 3 | 8 | 13 | 24 | −11 | 1 | 5 | 8 | 9 | 22 | −13 |

Last updated: 21 May 2022.
Source: See Results

==== Results by round ====
| Round | 1 | 2 | 3 | 4 | 5 | 6 | 7 | 8 | 9 | 10 | 11 | 12 | 13 | 14 | 15 | 16 | 17 | 18 | 19 | 20 | 21 | 22 | 23 | 24 | 25 | 26 | 27 | 28 |
|---|---|---|---|---|---|---|---|---|---|---|---|---|---|---|---|---|---|---|---|---|---|---|---|---|---|---|---|---|
| Ground | A | H | A | A | H | A | H | A | H | H | A | H | A | H | A | H | A | A | A | H | H | A | H | H | H | A | A | H |
| Result | W | W | L | L | D | L | D | L | W | L | L | L | D | L | D | L | L | L | D | L | L | D | L | L | W | L | D | W |
| Position | 1 | 1 | 4 | 5 | 5 | 5 | 5 | 6 | 5 | 5 | 6 | 6 | 6 | 7 | 7 | 7 | 7 | 7 | 7 | 7 | 7 | 7 | 7 | 7 | 7 | 7 | 7 | 6 |

Updated to match(es) played on 21 May 2022. Source: See Results
A = Away; H = Home; W = Win; D = Draw; L = Loss

==== Results ====
| 14 August 2021 1 | Keşla | 0 – 2 | Sumgayit | Baku |
| 20:30 AZT (UTC+4) | Guliyev (yellow card) 53'; Gigauri (yellow card) 70' | Report | Mustafayev (yellow card) 16'; Haghverdi (yellow card) 48'; Sadikhov 83', 89' (yellow card) 83' | Stadium: ASK Arena; Referee: Kamal Umudlu |

| 21 August 2021 2 | Sumgayit | 2 – 0 | Sabah | Sumgait |
| 20:00 AZT (UTC+4) | Ghorbani 32'; Mutallimov 78' | Report | Hasanalizade (yellow card) 60'; Seydiyev (yellow card) 62' | Stadium: Kapital Bank Arena; Referee: Aliyar Agayev |

| 12 September 2021 3 | Sabail | 1 – 0 | Sumgayit | Baku |
| 18:00 AZT (UTC+4) | Naghiyev (yellow card) 19'; Goxha (yellow card) 45+3'; Amirli 64' | Report | Ghorbani (yellow card) 23'; Bayramov (yellow card) 64'; Abdullazade (yellow card) 75' | Stadium: Bayil Arena; Referee: Vugar Hasanli |

| 20 September 2021 4 | Qarabağ | 2 – 0 | Sumgayit | Baku |
| 19:00 AZT (UTC+4) | Ozobić 42' (pen.), 90+5' (yellow card) 83'; Medvedev (yellow card) 45'; Richard (yellow card) 51' | Report | Badalov (yellow card) 41'; Naghiyev (yellow card) 53'; S.Bagherpasand (yellow card) 87' | Stadium: Azersun Arena; Referee: Kamal Umudlu |

| 26 September 2021 5 | Sumgayit | 0 – 0 | Gabala | Sumgait |
| 19:15 AZT (UTC+4) | Haghverdi (yellow card) 45+2'; Mustafayev (yellow card) 50' | Report | Abbasov (yellow card) 35'; Vukčević (yellow card) 85'; Muradov (yellow card) 87'; Ruan (yellow card) 90+1' | Stadium: Kapital Bank Arena; Referee: Elcin Masiyev |

| 1 October 2021 6 | Zira | 1 – 0 | Sumgayit | Zirə |
| 19:30 AZT (UTC+4) | Brogno 14' (yellow card) 45'; Jannatov (yellow card) 90+1'; Diniyev (yellow card) 90+4' | Report | Haghverdi (yellow card) 85'; Khachayev (yellow card) 87' | Stadium: Zira Olympic Sport Complex Stadium; Referee: Rauf Jabarov |

| 17 October 2021 7 | Sumgayit | 1 – 1 | Neftçi | Sumgait |
| 16:30 AZT (UTC+4) | Abdullazade (yellow card) 42'; Khachayev 50' | Report | Basto (yellow card) 39'; Bougrine 54'; Buludov (yellow card) 68'; Najafov (yellow card) 75' | Stadium: Kapital Bank Arena; Referee: Elcin Məsiyev |

| 23 October 2021 8 | Sabah | 3 – 0 | Sumgayit | Masazır |
| 16:00 AZT (UTC+4) | Ochihava (yellow card) 55'; Fofana 60', 83'; Aghayev (yellow card) 76'; Nuriyev 79' | Report | Khachayev (red card) 12'; Sadikhov (yellow card) 87'; S.Bagherpasand (yellow card) 90+2'; Mustafayev (yellow card) 90+3' | Stadium: Bank Respublika Arena; Referee: Ingilab Məmmədov |

| 31 October 2021 9 | Sumgayit | 2 – 0 | Sabail | Sumgait |
| 18:15 AZT (UTC+4) | Sadikhov 37'; Haghverdi (yellow card) 63'; S.Bagherpasand 74' | Report | Aliyev (yellow card) 15'; Rajsel (red card) 63' | Stadium: Kapital Bank Arena; Referee: Farid Haciyev |

| 7 November 2021 10 | Sumgayit | 0 – 4 | Qarabağ | Sumgait |
| 19:30 AZT (UTC+4) | E.Aliyev (yellow card) 50' | Report | Kady (yellow card) 28'; Sheydayev (yellow card) 39'; Gurbanli 45+2', 77'; Medvedev 51' (pen.); Ozobić (yellow card) 57' | Stadium: Kapital Bank Arena; Referee: Elcin Məsiyev |

| 21 November 2021 11 | Gabala | 2 – 1 | Sumgayit | Qabala |
| 16:00 AZT (UTC+4) | Musayev (yellow card) 54'; Isgandarov 65'; Utzig 67'; N.Mehbaliyev (yellow card) 90+3' | Report | Mustafayev (yellow card) 25'; Ahmadov (yellow card) 28'; Haghverdi 80'; V.Hüseynov (red card) 83'; Ghorbani (yellow card) 83' | Stadium: Gabala City Stadium; Referee: Raad Ahmadov |

| 28 November 2021 12 | Sumgayit | 0 – 3 | Zira | Sumgait |
| 16:00 AZT (UTC+4) | Haghverdi (yellow card) 13'; Abdullazade (yellow card) 90+2' | Report | Khalilzade 14' (pen.); Hamdaoui (yellow card) 16'; Aliyev 30'; Hüseynov (yellow card) 41'; Diniyev 79' (yellow card) 84'; Jannatov (yellow card) 89'; Chantakias (yellow card) 90+5' | Stadium: Kapital Bank Arena; Referee: Rauf Jabarov |

| 5 December 2021 13 | Neftçi | 0 – 0 | Sumgayit | Baku |
| 16:00 AZT (UTC+4) | Mahmudov (yellow card) 85' | Report | Mutallimov (yellow card) 33' | Stadium: Eighth Kilometer District Stadium; Referee: Vugar Hasanli |

| 15 December 2021 14 | Sumgayit | 1 – 3 | Keşla | Sumgait |
| 19:00 AZT (UTC+4) | Mustafayev (yellow card) 80'; Khodzhaniyazov 84' | Report | Azadov 36'; Hajiyev 47'; Felipe Santos 80' (pen.) | Stadium: Kapital Bank Arena; Referee: Aliyar Ağayev |

| 8 February 2022 15 | Sabail | 1 – 1 | Sumgayit | Bayil |
| 19:15 AZT (UTC+4) | Šimkus 17'; Amirguliyev (yellow card) 48' | Report | Mustafayev (yellow card) 31'; Arago 65' (o.g.); Naghiyev (yellow card) 67'; Ghorbani (yellow card) 76'; Sadikhov (yellow card) 89' | Stadium: Bayil Arena; Referee: Ravan Hamzazada |

| 27 February 2022 17 | Sumgayit | 0 – 4 | Gabala | Sumgait |
| 19:15 AZT (UTC+4) | Khachayev (yellow card) 68' | Report | Utzig 2'; Ruan 39'; Muradov 41'; Isayev (yellow card) 65'; Musayev 68' | Stadium: Kapital Bank Arena; Referee: Vugar Hasanli |

| 5 March 2022 18 | Zira | 1 – 0 | Sumgayit | Zirə |
| 17:00 AZT (UTC+4) | Volkovi (yellow card) 41'; Hajili (yellow card) 44'; Hamdaoui (yellow card) 65' | Report | Ghorbani (yellow card) 16'; Beybalayev (yellow card) 90+2' | Stadium: Zira Olympic Sport Complex Stadium; Referee: Rauf Allahverdiyev |

| 13 March 2022 19 | Neftçi | 2 – 1 | Sumgayit | Baku |
| 18:15 AZT (UTC+4) | Mahmudov 17', 82' (pen.); Lawal (yellow card) 26'; Çelik (yellow card) 53'; Ramon (yellow card) 83' | Report | Sadikhov 24'; Haghverdi (yellow card) 29'; Khodzhaniyazov (yellow card) 65'; Mustafayev (yellow card) 78' | Stadium: Eighth Kilometer District Stadium; Referee: Raad Ahmadov |

| 18 March 2022 20 | Keşla | 1 – 1 | Sumgayit | Baku |
| 17:00 AZT (UTC+4) | Azadov (yellow card) 38'; Yunanov 45'; Hajiyev (yellow card) 90+5' | Report | Khodzhaniyazov (yellow card) 38'; Khachayev (yellow card) 52'; Mahmudov (yellow card) 65'; Mustafayev (yellow card) 88' | Stadium: ASK Arena; Referee: Vugar Həsənli |

| 2 April 2022 21 | Sumgayit | 0 – 3 | Sabah | Baku |
| 18:15 AZT (UTC+4) | Sadikhov (yellow card) 28'; Khachayev (yellow card) 47'; Turabov (yellow card) 69' | Report | Isayev 22'; Cámara 25'; Mickels 50' | Stadium: Eighth Kilometer District Stadium; Referee: Kamal Umudlu |

| 10 April 2022 22 | Sumgayit | 0 – 3 | Qarabağ | Sumgait |
| 18:30 AZT (UTC+4) | Ghorbani (yellow card) 3'; Naghiyev (yellow card) 65' | Report | Kady 16'; Vešović 67'; L.Andrade 69' | Stadium: Kapital Bank Arena; Referee: Aliyar Ağayev |

| 15 April 2022 23 | Gabala | 1 – 1 | Sumgayit | Qabala |
| 17:00 AZT (UTC+4) | Vukčević (yellow card) 41'; Utzig (yellow card) 74'; Shahverdiyev (yellow card) 81'; Alimi 88' | Report | A.Abdullayev 17'; Mutallimov (yellow card) 39'; Naghiyev (yellow card) 76'; Khachayev (yellow card) 77'; Popovich (yellow card) 85'; Haghverdi (yellow card) 90+4' | Stadium: Gabala City Stadium; Referee: Rauf Jabarov |

| 24 April 2022 24 | Sumgayit | 0 – 1 | Zira | Sumgait |
| 20:00 AZT (UTC+4) | Khachayev (yellow card) 8'; Abdullazade (yellow card) 40'; Haghverdi (yellow card) 75' | Report | Volkovi 90+2'; Nazirov (yellow card) 90+2' | Stadium: Kapital Bank Arena; Referee: Elcin Masiyev |

| 4 May 2022 25 | Sumgayit | 0 – 2 | Neftçi | Sumgait |
| 20:00 AZT (UTC+4) | Khodzhaniyazov (red card) 19' | Report | Bezerra 12', 61'; Stanković (yellow card) 39'; Zulfugarli (yellow card) 45'; Israfilov (yellow card) 67'; R.Abbasov (yellow card) 71'; Yusifli (yellow card) 81' | Stadium: Kapital Bank Arena; Referee: Kamal Umudlu |

| 9 May 2022 26 | Sumgayit | 2 – 0 | Shamakhi | Sumgait |
| 17:30 AZT (UTC+4) | Ghorbani 31', 78'; Ahmadli (yellow card) 80'; Popovich (yellow card) 90+2' | Report | Azadov (yellow card) 65'; Tounkara (yellow card) 80' | Stadium: Kapital Bank Arena; Referee: Aliyar Ağayev |

| 12 May 2022 16 | Qarabağ | 5 – 0 | Sumgayit | Baku |
| 19:00 AZT (UTC+4) | Ozobić 4'; P.Andrade 11'; Kady 30', 52'; Wadji 31'; Medina (yellow card) 75' | Report | Khodzhaniyazov (yellow card) 90+3' | Stadium: Azersun Arena; Referee: Rauf Allahverdiyev |
Note: Originally scheduled for 19 February.

| 15 May 2022 27 | Sabah | 2 – 2 | Sumgayit | Masazır |
| 17:00 AZT (UTC+4) | Hasanalizade (yellow card) 4'; Ochihava (yellow card) 49'; Letić (yellow card) 50'; Seydiyev (red card) 53'; Christian (yellow card) 66'; Kashchuk (yellow card) 71' (goal) 90+6'; Ceballos 90+5' (pen.) | Report | Ahmadov (yellow card) 33'; S.Abdullazade (yellow card) 38'; Haghverdi (yellow card) 44'; Hüseynov 56'; Nuriyev (yellow card) 65'; R.Abdullazade (yellow card) 75'; Popovich (yellow card) 80'; Sadikhov 83'; Nabiyev (yellow card) 89' | Stadium: Bank Respublika Arena; Referee: Raad Ahmədov |

| 21 May 2022 28 | Sumgayit | 5 – 0 | Sabail | Sumgait |
| 19:00 AZT (UTC+4) | Nuriyev 6'; Mustafayev (yellow card) 27'; Ghorbani 35', 43'; Hüseynov (yellow card) 48'; Badalov 51'; Beybalayev 88' | Report | E.Tagiyev (yellow card) 76'; Naghiyev (yellow card) 90+3' | Stadium: Kapital Bank Arena; Referee: Ravan Hamzazada |

==== League table ====
| Pos | Team | Pld | W | D | L | GF | GA | GD | Pts | Qualification |
|---|---|---|---|---|---|---|---|---|---|---|
| 4 | Gabala | 28 | 12 | 9 | 7 | 38 | 34 | +4 | 45 | Qualification to Europa Conference League second qualifying round |
| 5 | Sabah | 28 | 12 | 5 | 11 | 42 | 34 | +8 | 41 | |
| 6 | Sumgayit | 28 | 5 | 7 | 16 | 22 | 46 | −24 | 22 (Note: Head-to-head points: Sumgayit 7, Shamakhi 4.) | |
| 7 | Shamakhi | 28 | 5 | 7 | 16 | 25 | 49 | −24 | 22 | |
| 8 | Sabail | 28 | 4 | 3 | 21 | 17 | 57 | −40 | 15 | |

Source: Soccerway
Rules for classification: 1) Points; 2) Head-to-head points; 3) Head-to-head goal difference; 4) Head-to-head goals scored; 5) Head-to-head away goals scored (only if two teams); 6) Goal difference; 7) Goals scored.

=== Azerbaijan Cup ===
| 2 February 2022 Quarterfinal 1st leg | Sumgayit | 0 – 1 | Gabala | Sumgait |
| 19:15 AZT (UTC+4) | Mustafayev (yellow card) 8'; Khachayev (yellow card) 50'; E.Abdullayev (yellow card) 65'; Nabiyev (yellow card) 85' | Report | Alimi 26' (pen.) (yellow card) 77'; Vukčević (yellow card) 86'; Shahverdiyev (yellow card) 90+1' | Stadium: Kapital Bank Arena; Referee: Rauf Jabarov |

| 13 February 2022 Quarterfinal 2nd leg | Gabala | 1 – 1 (2 – 1 agg.) | Sumgayit | Qabala |
| 15:00 AZT (UTC+4) | Alimi 18'; López (yellow card) 64'; Mammadov (yellow card) 67'; Ruan (yellow card) 69'; Isgandarov (yellow card) 73' | Report | Mustafayev (yellow card) 52'; Haghverdi (yellow card) 70'; A.Abdullayev 82'; E.Abdullayev (yellow card) 90' | Stadium: Gabala City Stadium; Referee: Kamal Umudlu |

=== UEFA Europa Conference League ===
==== Qualifying rounds ====
| 21 July 2021 Second qualifying round 1st leg | Čukarički (Serbia) | 0 – 0 | (Azerbaijan) Sumgayit | Belgrade, Serbia |
| 22:00 AZT (UTC+4) | Mijailović (yellow card) 60'; B.Roganovic (yellow card) 70'; Janković (yellow card) 90' | Report | Turabov (yellow card) 90+1'; Bayramov (yellow card) 90+3' | Stadium: Čukarički Stadium; Attendance: 1,200; Referee: Urs Schnyder (Switzerland) |

| 29 July 2021 Second qualifying round 2nd leg | Sumgayit (Azerbaijan) | 0 – 2 (0 – 2 agg.) | (Serbia) Čukarički | Sumgayit, Azerbaijan |
| 20:00 AZT (UTC+4) | Mustafayev (yellow card) 55' | Report | N'Diaye 10' (yellow card) 34'; Docić 16' (pen.); Stevanović (yellow card) 59'; Tanasijević (yellow card) 81'; Jovanović (yellow card) 90+6' | Stadium: Kapital Bank Arena; Attendance: 750; Referee: Jørgen Burchardt (Denmark) |

== Squad statistics ==
As of match played 21 May 2022

=== Appearances and goals ===
| No. | Pos | Nat | Player | Total | | Premier League | | Azerbaijan Cup | | Europa Conference League | |
| No. | Pos | Nat | Player | Apps | Goals | Apps | Goals | Apps | Goals | Apps | Goals |
|---|---|---|---|---|---|---|---|---|---|---|---|
| 1 | GK | (Azerbaijan) AZE | Tarlan Ahmadli | 7 | 0 | 6+1 | 0 | 0 | 0 | 0 | 0 |
| 2 | DF | (Azerbaijan) AZE | Dmitri Naghiyev | 28 | 0 | 17+7 | 0 | 2 | 0 | 0+2 | 0 |
| 3 | DF | (Azerbaijan) AZE | Vurğun Hüseynov | 10 | 1 | 8+1 | 1 | 0 | 0 | 0+1 | 0 |
| 4 | DF | (Azerbaijan) AZE | Hojjat Haghverdi | 29 | 1 | 25 | 1 | 2 | 0 | 2 | 0 |
| 5 | DF | (Russia) RUS | Dzhamaldin Khodzhaniyazov | 28 | 1 | 24 | 1 | 2 | 0 | 2 | 0 |
| 6 | MF | (Azerbaijan) AZE | Vugar Mustafayev | 29 | 0 | 25 | 0 | 2 | 0 | 2 | 0 |
| 7 | MF | (Azerbaijan) AZE | Tellur Mutallimov | 27 | 1 | 24 | 1 | 2 | 0 | 1 | 0 |
| 8 | MF | (Azerbaijan) AZE | Sabuhi Abdullazade | 28 | 0 | 19+7 | 0 | 0+1 | 0 | 0+1 | 0 |
| 9 | FW | (Azerbaijan) AZE | Ali Ghorbani | 27 | 5 | 22+1 | 5 | 1+1 | 0 | 2 | 0 |
| 10 | MF | (Azerbaijan) AZE | Rahim Sadikhov | 28 | 5 | 23+1 | 5 | 2 | 0 | 2 | 0 |
| 11 | MF | (Azerbaijan) AZE | Rufat Abdullazade | 31 | 0 | 17+10 | 0 | 2 | 0 | 2 | 0 |
| 13 | GK | (Azerbaijan) AZE | Aydin Bayramov | 17 | 0 | 13 | 0 | 2 | 0 | 2 | 0 |
| 14 | DF | (Azerbaijan) AZE | Elvin Badalov | 7 | 1 | 5 | 1 | 0 | 0 | 2 | 0 |
| 15 | MF | (Azerbaijan) AZE | Vugar Beybalayev | 4 | 1 | 0+4 | 1 | 0 | 0 | 0 | 0 |
| 17 | MF | (Azerbaijan) AZE | Murad Khachayev | 26 | 1 | 21+1 | 1 | 2 | 0 | 2 | 0 |
| 18 | MF | (Azerbaijan) AZE | Suleyman Ahmadov | 14 | 0 | 10+2 | 0 | 0 | 0 | 2 | 0 |
| 19 | FW | (Azerbaijan) AZE | Khazar Mahmudov | 16 | 0 | 3+10 | 0 | 1 | 0 | 0+2 | 0 |
| 20 | MF | (Azerbaijan) AZE | Roman Huseynov | 4 | 0 | 0+3 | 0 | 0 | 0 | 0+1 | 0 |
| 23 | GK | (Azerbaijan) AZE | Andrey Popovich | 9 | 0 | 9 | 0 | 0 | 0 | 0 | 0 |
| 24 | MF | (Azerbaijan) AZE | Elshan Abdullayev | 7 | 0 | 1+4 | 0 | 1+1 | 0 | 0 | 0 |
| 30 | DF | (Azerbaijan) AZE | Nabi Mammadov | 2 | 0 | 0+2 | 0 | 0 | 0 | 0 | 0 |
| 33 | MF | (Azerbaijan) AZE | Eltun Turabov | 10 | 0 | 5+4 | 0 | 0 | 0 | 0+1 | 0 |
| 55 | FW | (Azerbaijan) AZE | Ibrahim Aliyev | 2 | 0 | 0+2 | 0 | 0 | 0 | 0 | 0 |
| 60 | MF | (Azerbaijan) AZE | Elvin Mammadov | 12 | 0 | 1+10 | 0 | 0+1 | 0 | 0 | 0 |
| 74 | DF | (Azerbaijan) AZE | Yusif Nabiyev | 15 | 0 | 9+2 | 0 | 1+1 | 0 | 1+1 | 0 |
| 78 | MF | (Azerbaijan) AZE | Araz Abdullayev | 13 | 2 | 10+2 | 1 | 0+1 | 1 | 0 | 0 |
| 91 | FW | (Azerbaijan) AZE | Anatoliy Nuriyev | 5 | 1 | 4+1 | 1 | 0 | 0 | 0 | 0 |
| 98 | DF | (Azerbaijan) AZE | Emil Aliyev | 1 | 0 | 1 | 0 | 0 | 0 | 0 | 0 |
Players away on loan:
Players who left Sumgayit during the season:
| 23 | FW | (Iran) IRI | Saeid Bagherpasand | 11 | 1 | 3+8 | 1 | 0 | 0 | 0 | 0 |

=== Goal scorers ===
| Place | Position | Nation | Number | Name | Premier League | Azerbaijan Cup | Europa Conference League | Total |
|---|---|---|---|---|---|---|---|---|
| 1 | MF | (Azerbaijan) | 10 | Rahim Sadikhov | 5 | 0 | 0 | 5 |
| 1 | FW | (Azerbaijan) | 9 | Ali Ghorbani | 5 | 0 | 0 | 5 |
| 3 | MF | (Azerbaijan) | 78 | Araz Abdullayev | 1 | 1 | 0 | 2 |
| 3 | | | | Own goal | 2 | 0 | 0 | 2 |
| 5 | MF | (Azerbaijan) | 7 | Tellur Mutallimov | 1 | 0 | 0 | 1 |
| 5 | MF | (Azerbaijan) | 17 | Murad Khachayev | 1 | 0 | 0 | 1 |
| 5 | FW | (Iran) | 23 | Saeid Bagherpasand | 1 | 0 | 0 | 1 |
| 5 | DF | (Azerbaijan) | 4 | Hojjat Haghverdi | 1 | 0 | 0 | 1 |
| 5 | DF | (Azerbaijan) | 5 | Dzhamaldin Khodzhaniyazov | 1 | 0 | 0 | 1 |
| 5 | DF | (Azerbaijan) | 3 | Vurğun Hüseynov | 1 | 0 | 0 | 1 |
| 5 | FW | (Azerbaijan) | 91 | Anatoliy Nuriyev | 1 | 0 | 0 | 1 |
| 5 | DF | (Azerbaijan) | 14 | Elvin Badalov | 1 | 0 | 0 | 1 |
| 5 | MF | (Azerbaijan) | 15 | Vugar Beybalayev | 1 | 0 | 0 | 1 |
| | | | | TOTALS | 20 | 1 | 0 | 21 |

=== Clean sheets ===
| Place | Position | Nation | Number | Name | Premier League | Azerbaijan Cup | Europa Conference League | Total |
|---|---|---|---|---|---|---|---|---|
| 1 | GK | (Azerbaijan) | 13 | Aydin Bayramov | 4 | 0 | 0 | 4 |
| 2 | GK | (Azerbaijan) | 1 | Tarlan Ahmadli | 2 | 0 | 0 | 2 |
| 2 | GK | (Azerbaijan) | 23 | Andrey Popovich | 2 | 0 | 0 | 2 |
| | | | | TOTALS | 8 | 0 | 0 | 8 |

Bayramov & Ahmadli both played in Sumgayit's 2-0 victory over Keşla on 14 August 2021

=== Disciplinary record ===
| Number | Nation | Position | Name | Premier League | | Azerbaijan Cup | | Europa Conference League | | Total | |
| Number | Nation | Position | Name | Yellow card | Red card | Yellow card | Red card | Yellow card | Red card | Yellow card | Red card |
| 2 | (Azerbaijan) | DF | Dmitri Naghiyev | 5 | 0 | 0 | 0 | 0 | 0 | 5 | 0 |
| 3 | (Azerbaijan) | DF | Vurğun Hüseynov | 1 | 1 | 0 | 0 | 0 | 0 | 1 | 1 |
| 4 | (Azerbaijan) | DF | Hojjat Haghverdi | 9 | 0 | 1 | 0 | 0 | 0 | 10 | 0 |
| 5 | (Russia) | DF | Dzhamaldin Khodzhaniyazov | 3 | 1 | 0 | 0 | 0 | 0 | 3 | 1 |
| 6 | (Azerbaijan) | MF | Vugar Mustafayev | 9 | 0 | 2 | 0 | 1 | 0 | 12 | 0 |
| 7 | (Azerbaijan) | MF | Tellur Mutallimov | 2 | 0 | 0 | 0 | 0 | 0 | 2 | 0 |
| 8 | (Azerbaijan) | MF | Sabuhi Abdullazade | 3 | 0 | 0 | 0 | 0 | 0 | 3 | 0 |
| 9 | (Azerbaijan) | FW | Ali Ghorbani | 5 | 0 | 0 | 0 | 0 | 0 | 5 | 0 |
| 10 | (Azerbaijan) | MF | Rahim Sadikhov | 4 | 0 | 0 | 0 | 0 | 0 | 4 | 0 |
| 11 | (Azerbaijan) | MF | Rufat Abdullazade | 3 | 0 | 0 | 0 | 0 | 0 | 3 | 0 |
| 13 | (Azerbaijan) | GK | Aydin Bayramov | 1 | 0 | 0 | 0 | 1 | 0 | 2 | 0 |
| 14 | (Azerbaijan) | DF | Elvin Badalov | 1 | 0 | 0 | 0 | 0 | 0 | 1 | 0 |
| 15 | (Azerbaijan) | MF | Vugar Beybalayev | 1 | 0 | 0 | 0 | 0 | 0 | 1 | 0 |
| 17 | (Azerbaijan) | MF | Murad Khachayev | 6 | 1 | 1 | 0 | 0 | 0 | 7 | 1 |
| 18 | (Azerbaijan) | MF | Suleyman Ahmadov | 2 | 0 | 0 | 0 | 0 | 0 | 2 | 0 |
| 19 | (Azerbaijan) | FW | Khazar Mahmudov | 1 | 0 | 0 | 0 | 0 | 0 | 1 | 0 |
| 23 | (Azerbaijan) | GK | Andrey Popovich | 3 | 0 | 0 | 0 | 0 | 0 | 3 | 0 |
| 24 | (Azerbaijan) | MF | Elshan Abdullayev | 0 | 0 | 2 | 0 | 0 | 0 | 2 | 0 |
| 33 | (Azerbaijan) | MF | Eltun Turabov | 1 | 0 | 0 | 0 | 1 | 0 | 2 | 0 |
| 74 | (Azerbaijan) | DF | Yusif Nabiyev | 1 | 0 | 1 | 0 | 0 | 0 | 2 | 0 |
| 91 | (Azerbaijan) | FW | Anatoliy Nuriyev | 1 | 0 | 0 | 0 | 0 | 0 | 1 | 0 |
| 98 | (Azerbaijan) | DF | Emil Aliyev | 1 | 0 | 0 | 0 | 0 | 0 | 1 | 0 |
Players who left Sumgayit during the season:
| 23 | (Iran) | FW | Saeid Bagherpasand | 2 | 0 | 0 | 0 | 0 | 0 | 2 | 0 |
| | | | TOTALS | 65 | 3 | 7 | 0 | 3 | 0 | 75 | 3 |
