= 2021–22 Gabala FK season =

Gabala
2021-22 season
- Chairman: Fariz Najafov
- Manager: Elmar Bakhshiyev
- Stadium: Gabala City Stadium
- Premier League: 4th
- Azerbaijan Cup: Semifinal vs Qarabağ
- Top goalscorer: League: Isnik Alimi (8); All: Isnik Alimi (10)
Home colours	Away colours

The 2021–22 season was Gabala FK's 17th season, and their 16th in the Azerbaijan Premier League, the top-flight of Azerbaijani football.

== Season events ==
On 9 June, Gabala announced the return of Urfan Abbasov on a one-year contract from Sabail. 9 Days later, 18 June 2021, Magsad Isayev also joined Gabala from Sabail, signing a two-year contract.

On 7 July, Gabala announced the signing of Nijat Mehbaliyev on a season-long loan deal from Sabah.

On 19 July, Gabala announced the signing of Christophe Atangana to a two-year contract from Bilbao Athletic.

On 30 July, Gabala announced the signing of Isnik Alimi to a one-year contract from Atalanta.

On 5 August, Gabala announced the signing of Ruan Renato from Ponte Preta on a one-year contract, with the option of an additional year.

On 1 September, Gabala announced the signing of Omar Hani to a one-year contract, with the option of an additional year, from APOEL.

On 8 October, Fernań López returned to Gabala after leaving Jagiellonia Białystok during the summer, on a contract until the summer of 2022.

On 11 January, Gabala announced the signing of Patrick on loan from Admira Wacker until the summer of 2023.

On 31 January, Gabala announced the signing of Samet Karakoc from Bayrampaşa until the summer of 2023.

Gabala's match against Zira on 13 March was postponed in the 65th minute due to weather conditions, with the remaining 25 minutes being played on 14 March at 12:30.

== Squad ==
As of match played 21 May 2022

No.	Name	Nationality	Position	Date of birth (age)	Signed from	Signed in	Contract ends	Apps.	Goals
Goalkeepers
1	Christophe Atangana	(Cameroon)	GK	2 March 2000 (aged 22)	Bilbao Athletic	2021	2023	5	0
36	Elməddin Sultanov	(Azerbaijan)	GK	7 May 2001 (aged 21)	Trainee	2021		0	0
94	Nijat Mehbaliyev	(Azerbaijan)	GK	11 September 2000 (aged 21)	loan from Sabah	2021	2022	28	0
Defenders
2	Samet Karakoc	(Azerbaijan)	DF	22 October 2002 (aged 19)	Bayrampaşa	2022	2023	1	0
4	Ruan Renato	(Brazil)	DF	14 January 1994 (aged 28)	Ponte Preta	2021	2022(+1)	31	2
12	Rufat Ahmadov	(Azerbaijan)	DF	22 September 2002 (aged 19)	Trainee	2020		29	0
27	Magsad Isayev	(Azerbaijan)	DF	7 June 1994 (aged 27)	Sabail	2021	2023	31	1
28	Murad Musayev	(Azerbaijan)	DF	13 June 1994 (aged 27)	Zira	2019		68	2
33	Huseyn Mursalov	(Azerbaijan)	DF	12 July 2002 (aged 19)	Trainee	2021		3	0
34	Urfan Abbasov	(Azerbaijan)	DF	14 October 1992 (aged 29)	Sabail	2021	2022	249	4
Midfielders
5	Isnik Alimi	(Albania)	MF	2 February 1994 (aged 28)	Atalanta	2021	2022	32	10
6	Kamal Mirzayev	(Azerbaijan)	MF	14 September 1994 (aged 27)	Al-Salmiya	2020		15	0
7	Ehtiram Shahverdiyev	(Azerbaijan)	MF	1 October 1996 (aged 25)	Sumgayit	2020	2021	43	1
8	Stefan Vukčević	(Montenegro)	MF	11 April 1997 (aged 25)	Zeta	2020	2022	58	2
9	Fernán López	(Spain)	MF	10 February 1995 (aged 27)	Unattached	2021	2022	41	4
10	Omar Hani	(Jordan)	MF	27 June 1999 (aged 22)	APOEL	2021	2022 (+1)	25	2
11	Asif Mammadov	(Azerbaijan)	MF	5 August 1986 (aged 35)	Inter Baku	2015		198+	16
17	Yaovi Akakpo	(Togo)	MF	11 March 1999 (aged 23)		2019	2022	6	2
19	Rovlan Muradov	(Azerbaijan)	MF	28 March 1998 (aged 24)	Trainee	2017		77	9
20	Rauf Rustamli	(Azerbaijan)	MF	11 January 2003 (aged 19)	Trainee	2021		0	0
88	Gulagha Asadov	(Azerbaijan)	MF	30 April 2003 (aged 19)	Trainee	2021		0	0
Forwards
14	Ulvi Isgandarov	(Azerbaijan)	FW	17 April 1998 (aged 24)	Trainee	2017		74	13
18	Mehrac Baxşalı	(Azerbaijan)	FW	11 June 2003 (aged 18)	Trainee	2021		0	0
23	Raphael Utzig	(Brazil)	FW	8 August 1996 (aged 25)	Paraná	2020	2022	58	11
24	Patrick	(Brazil)	FW	11 May 1998 (aged 24)	loan from Admira Wacker	2022	2023	13	0
77	Emil Safarov	(Azerbaijan)	FW	30 October 2002 (aged 19)	Trainee	2021		20	2
Out on loan
Left during the season

== Transfers ==
=== In ===
Date	Position	Nationality	Name	From	Fee	Ref.
Summer 2021	FW	(Azerbaijan)	Ulvi Isgandarov	Gabala		
9 June 2021	DF	(Azerbaijan)	Urfan Abbasov	Sabail	Undisclosed	
18 June 2021	DF	(Azerbaijan)	Magsad Isayev	Sabail	Undisclosed	
19 July 2021	GK	(Cameroon)	Christophe Atangana	Bilbao Athletic	Undisclosed	
30 July 2021	MF	(Albania)	Isnik Alimi	Atalanta	Free	
5 August 2021	DF	(Brazil)	Ruan Renato	Ponte Preta	Undisclosed	
1 September 2021	MF	(Jordan)	Omar Hani	APOEL	Undisclosed	
8 October 2021	MF	(Spain)	Fernań López	Unattached	Free	
31 January 2022	DF	(Azerbaijan)	Samet Karakoc	Bayrampaşa	Undisclosed	

=== Loans in ===
Date from	Position	Nationality	Name	From	Date to	Ref.
7 July 2021	GK	(Azerbaijan)	Nijat Mehbaliyev	Sabah	End of season	
11 January 2022	FW	(Brazil)	Patrick	Admira Wacker	June 2023	

=== Out ===
Date	Position	Nationality	Name	To	Fee	Ref.
18 June 2021	GK	(Azerbaijan)	Tarlan Ahmadli	Sumgayit	Undisclosed	
2 July 2021	GK	(Azerbaijan)	Anar Nazirov	Zira	Undisclosed	
7 August 2021	DF	(Albania)	Jurgen Goxha	Sabail	Undisclosed	

=== Released ===
Date	Position	Nationality	Name	Joined	Date	Ref
17 July 2021	DF	(Azerbaijan)	Rasim Ramaldanov	Retired		
30 June 2022	DF	(Azerbaijan)	Samet Karakoc	Isparta 32 Spor		
30 June 2022	MF	(Azerbaijan)	Kamal Mirzayev	Shamakhi		
30 June 2022	MF	(Azerbaijan)	Ehtiram Shahverdiyev	Turan Tovuz		
30 June 2022	MF	(Montenegro)	Stefan Vukčević	Enosis Neon Paralimni	15 July 2022	
30 June 2022	MF	(Spain)	Fernán López	Enosis Neon Paralimni	1 July 2022	

== Friendlies ==
16 July 2021	Zira	3 – 0	Gabala	Zirə
AZT (UTC+4)	Aliyev; Ramazanov; Welves	Report		Stadium: Zira Olympic Sport Complex Stadium

21 July 2021	Sabail	2 – 3	Gabala	Baku
AZT (UTC+4)	(pen.)	Report	Isgandarov (pen.); Hajiyev (o.g.)	Stadium: Baku Olympic Stadium

30 July 2021	Zira	1 – 2	Gabala	Baku
AZT (UTC+4)	Welves 59'	Report	Akakpo 10'; Mirzayev 87'	Stadium: Dalga Arena

7 August 2021	Sabah	2 – 4	Gabala	Masazır
19:00 AZT (UTC+4)	Mickels; Fofana	Report	Musayev; Muradov; Alimi	Stadium: Bank Respublika Arena

30 August 2021	Gabala	4 – 1	Gabala-2	Qabala
AZT (UTC+4)		Report		Stadium: Gabala City Stadium

4 September 2021	Gabala	4 – 0	Gabala-2	Qabala
AZT (UTC+4)		Report		Stadium: Gabala City Stadium

18 January 2022	Gabala (Azerbaijan)	1 – 2	(Poland) Zagłębie Lubin	Belek, Turkey
16:00 AZT (UTC+4)	López 9'	Report	(2nd half) (2nd half)	Stadium: IC Santai Football Center

21 January 2022	Gabala (Azerbaijan)	1 – 0	(North Macedonia) Borec	Belek, Turkey
16:30 AZT (UTC+4)	Hani 11'	Report

24 January 2022	Gabala (Azerbaijan)	1 – 3	(Czech Republic) Bohemians 1905	Belek, Turkey
16:30 AZT (UTC+4)	Alimi 75' (pen.)	Report	Chramosta 18', 37'; Hronek 80'

27 March 2022	Zira	1 – 2	Gabala	Zirə
16:00 AZT (UTC+4)	Keyta 5'	Report	Alimi 49'; Utzig 63'	Stadium: Tofiq Bahramov Republican Stadium

== Competitions ==
=== Overview ===
Competition	First match	Last match	Starting round	Final position	Record							
Competition	First match	Last match	Starting round	Final position	Pld	W	D	L	GF	GA	GD	Win %
Premier League	15 August 2021	21 May 2022	Matchday 1	4th	28	12	9	7	38	34	+4	42.86
Azerbaijan Cup	9 December 2021	29 April 2022	First Round	Semifinal	5	2	1	2	5	10	−5	40.00
Total					33	14	10	9	43	44	−1	42.42

Last updated: 21 May 2022
Source: Competitions

=== Premier League ===
==== Results summary ====
Overall								Home						Away					
Pld	W	D	L	GF	GA	GD	Pts	W	D	L	GF	GA	GD	W	D	L	GF	GA	GD
28	12	9	7	38	34	+4	45	5	7	2	18	12	+6	7	2	5	20	22	−2

Last updated: 21 May 2022.
Source: See Results

==== Results by round ====
Round	1	2	3	4	5	6	7	8	9	10	11	12	13	14	15	16	17	18	19	20	21	22	23	24	25	26	27	28
Ground	A	H	A	H	A	A	H	A	H	A	H	H	A	H	A	H	A	A	H	A	H	A	H	H	A	H	A	H
Result	D	W	W	W	D	L	D	W	L	W	W	D	W	D	L	W	W	L	D	L	D	L	D	L	W	W	W	D
Position	4	2	1	1	1	3	3	3	3	2	2	3	2	2	2	2	2	3	4	4	4	4	4	5	4	4	4	4

Updated to match(es) played on 21 May 2022. Source: See Results
A = Away; H = Home; W = Win; D = Draw; L = Loss

==== Results ====
15 August 2021 1	Neftçi	2 – 2	Gabala	Baku
20:00 AZT (UTC+4)	Kané (yellow card) 40'; Muradbayli (yellow card) 45' (goal) 55'; Stanković 76'; Basque (yellow card) 90+2'	Report	Isayev (yellow card) 62'; Alimi 67' (pen.); Ahmadov (yellow card) 75'; Isgandarov 84'	Stadium: Eighth Kilometer District Stadium; Referee: Elcin Masiyev

21 August 2021 2	Gabala	2 – 1	Keşla	Qabala
18:00 AZT (UTC+4)	Akakpo 11'; Utzig 30'; Vukčević (yellow card) 64'; Isayev (yellow card) 68'; E.Səfərov (yellow card) 90+2'; Alimi (yellow card) 90+5'	Report	Salahli (yellow card) 45+1'; Abang 77'; O.Goudiaby (yellow card) 80'; Aliyev (yellow card) 90+5' (red card) 90+5'	Stadium: Gabala City Stadium; Referee: Raad Ahmadov

11 September 2021 3	Sabah	0 – 2	Gabala	Masazır
19:00 AZT (UTC+4)	Ceballos (yellow card) 23'; Alekperov (yellow card) 26'; Hasanalizade (yellow card) 56'; Jamalov (yellow card) 76'	Report	Musayev (yellow card) 27'; Akakpo 53'; Mehbaliyev (yellow card) 90+1'; Isgandarov 90+3'	Stadium: Bank Respublika Arena; Referee: Rauf Jabbarov

18 September 2021 4	Gabala	5 – 0	Sabail	Qabala
17:00 AZT (UTC+4)	Utzig (yellow card) 22' (goal) 90+1'; Vukčević (yellow card) 34'; Mammadov (yellow card) 35'; Muradov 65'; Alimi (yellow card) 81' (goal) 90+5'; Isgandarov 84'; Shahverdiyev 89'	Report	Aliyev (yellow card) 3'; Šimkus (yellow card) 52'; Garahmadov (yellow card) 81' (yellow-red card) 86'	Stadium: Gabala City Stadium; Referee: Rauf Allahverdiyev

26 September 2021 5	Sumgayit	0 – 0	Gabala	Sumgait
19:15 AZT (UTC+4)	Haghverdi (yellow card) 45+2'; Mustafayev (yellow card) 50'	Report	Abbasov (yellow card) 35'; Vukčević (yellow card) 85'; Muradov (yellow card) 87'; Ruan (yellow card) 90+1'	Stadium: Kapital Bank Arena; Referee: Elcin Masiyev

3 October 2021 6	Qarabağ	2 – 0	Gabala	Baku
19:00 AZT (UTC+4)	Zoubir 52'; Sheydayev 66'	Report	Isayev (yellow card) 28'; Isgandarov (yellow card) 90+2'	Stadium: Azersun Arena; Referee: Aliyar Aghayev

16 October 2021 7	Gabala	1 – 1	Zira	Qabala
17:00 AZT (UTC+4)	Ruan (yellow card) 45+3'; López (yellow card) 60'; Alimi (yellow card) 62'; Isgandarov 79'; Shahverdiyev (red card) 90+5'	Report	Huseynov 18'; Khalilzade (yellow card) 71'; Hajili (yellow card) 88'; Chantakias (yellow card) 90+5'	Stadium: Gabala City Stadium; Referee: Aliyar Aghayev

24 October 2021 8	Keşla	2 – 3	Gabala	Baku
16:00 AZT (UTC+4)	Guliyev (yellow card) 18'; Aldair 38'; Aliyev (yellow card) 90+2'; Yunanov 90+7'	Report	Vukčević (yellow card) 17' (yellow-red card) 69'; Isayev (yellow card) 21'; Ruan 23' (yellow card) 82'; Mammadov 30'; Alimi 60'; Hani (yellow card) 90+6'	Stadium: ASK Arena; Referee: Vugar Hasanli

31 October 2021 9	Gabala	1 – 3	Sabah	Qabala
16:00 AZT (UTC+4)	Mammadov (yellow card) 40'; Alimi 69' (pen.)	Report	Mickels 20'; Fofana 39' (yellow card) 68'; Isayev (yellow card) 45+1' (goal) 63'; Seydiyev (yellow card) 58'; Jamalov (yellow card) 73'	Stadium: Gabala City Stadium; Referee: Elcin Masiyev

7 November 2021 10	Sabail	0 – 2	Gabala	Bayil
15:00 AZT (UTC+4)	V.Cəfərov (yellow card) 20'; Mirzabeyov (yellow card) 30'; Goxha (yellow card) 56' (yellow-red card) 56'	Report	Isgandarov (yellow card) 46'; López (yellow card) 80'; E.Səfərov (yellow card) 85' (goal) 88'; Isayev 90+5'	Stadium: Bayil Arena; Referee: Ravan Hamzazada

21 November 2021 11	Gabala	2 – 1	Sumgayit	Qabala
16:00 AZT (UTC+4)	Musayev (yellow card) 54'; Isgandarov 65'; Utzig 67'; Mehbaliyev (yellow card) 90+3'	Report	Mustafayev (yellow card) 25'; Ahmadov (yellow card) 28'; Haghverdi 80'; Hüseynov (red card) 83'; Ghorbani (yellow card) 83'	Stadium: Gabala City Stadium; Referee: Raad Ahmadov

29 November 2021 12	Gabala	0 – 0	Qarabağ	Qabala
16:00 AZT (UTC+4)	Mammadov (yellow card) 45'; Muradov (yellow card) 57'; López (yellow card) 87'; Vukčević (yellow card) 87'; Mehbaliyev (yellow card) 90'	Report	Andrade (yellow card) 79'	Stadium: Gabala City Stadium; Referee: Kamranbay Rahimov

5 December 2021 13	Zira	1 – 2	Gabala	Zirə
18:15 AZT (UTC+4)	R.Nuruyev (yellow card) 15'; Hüseynov (yellow card) 29'; Volkovi (yellow card) 42' (goal) 45+4'; Jannatov (yellow card) 90+2'	Report	Abbasov 32' (yellow card) 74'; Muradov (yellow card) 37' (goal) 40'; Hani (yellow card) 62' (yellow-red card) 87'	Stadium: Zira Olympic Sport Complex Stadium; Referee: Elcin Məsiyev

15 December 2021 14	Gabala	1 – 1	Neftçi	Qabala
16:00 AZT (UTC+4)	Musayev (yellow card) 11'; Utzig 28'; Ruan (yellow card) 53' (yellow-red card) 89'; E.Səfərov (yellow card) 76'	Report	Çelik (yellow card) 19'; Mahmudov 39' (yellow card) 65'; Meza (yellow card) 55'; Basque (yellow card) 86'	Stadium: Gabala City Stadium; Referee: Kamal Umudlu

8 February 2022 15	Sabah	3 – 0	Gabala	Masazır
17:00 AZT (UTC+4)	Mickels 38'; Cámara 41'; Ochihava (yellow card) 46'; Rodríguez 76' (yellow card) 90+3'; Hasanalizade (yellow card) 85'	Report	López (yellow card) 40'	Stadium: Bank Respublika Arena; Referee: Elcin Məsiyev

19 February 2022 16	Gabala	2 – 0	Sabail	Qabala
15:00 AZT (UTC+4)	Utzig (yellow card) 75'; Isgandarov 78'; Alimi 90+7'	Report	Goxha (yellow card) 3'; Arago (yellow card) 39'; Mirzabeyov (yellow card) 75'	Stadium: Gabala City Stadium; Referee: Rauf Jabarov

27 February 2022 17	Sumgayit	0 – 4	Gabala	Sumgait
19:15 AZT (UTC+4)	Khachayev (yellow card) 68'	Report	Utzig 2'; Ruan 39'; Muradov 41'; Isayev (yellow card) 65'; Musayev 68'	Stadium: Kapital Bank Arena; Referee: Vugar Hasanli

6 March 2022 18	Qarabağ	5 – 1	Gabala	Baku
19:15 AZT (UTC+4)	Kady 16' (yellow card) 22'; Medina (yellow card) 39' (goal) 65'; Wadji 51'; Garayev (yellow card) 54'; Ozobić 68'; Zoubir 89'	Report	Alimi 40' (pen.); Vukčević (yellow card) 45+1'; Utzig (yellow card) 74'	Stadium: Azersun Arena; Referee: Elcin Məsiyev

13 March 2022 19	Gabala	0 – 0	Zira	Qabala
16:00 AZT (UTC+4)	López (yellow card) 90+3'	Report	Hamdaoui (yellow card) 35'; Mammadov (yellow card) 51'; Alceus (yellow card) 68'; Hajili (yellow card) 90+3'	Stadium: Gabala City Stadium; Referee: Aliyar Aghayev
Note: Match was postponed in the 65th minute on 13 March due to weather conditions, with the remaining 25 minutes being played on 14 March at 12:30.

18 March 2022 20	Neftçi	4 – 0	Gabala	Baku
19:37 AZT (UTC+4)	Israfilov 6', 90+5' (yellow card) 47'; Mbodj 17'; Stanković (yellow card) 69'; Pato 82'	Report	Vukčević (yellow card) 46'; Alimi (yellow card) 69'	Stadium: Eighth Kilometer District Stadium; Referee: Elcin Masiyev

3 April 2022 21	Gabala	1 – 1	Keşla	Qabala
15:00 AZT (UTC+4)	Ruan (yellow card) 20'; Hani 47'	Report	Gigauri 32'; Guliyev (red card) 51'; Bayramov (yellow card) 64' (yellow-red card) 64'; Tounkara (yellow card) 90+5'	Stadium: Gabala City Stadium; Referee: Farid Haciyev

10 April 2022 22	Sabail	3 – 0	Gabala	Bayil
20:30 AZT (UTC+4)	Naghiyev 41'; Rajsel 68'; I.Aslanly 73'; Šimkus (yellow card) 87'	Report	Alimi (yellow card) 66'; Ahmadov (yellow card) 67'; Mammadov (yellow card) 68'	Stadium: Bayil Arena; Referee: Vugar Hasanli

15 April 2022 23	Gabala	1 – 1	Sumgayit	Qabala
17:00 AZT (UTC+4)	Vukčević (yellow card) 41'; Utzig (yellow card) 74'; Shahverdiyev (yellow card) 81'; Alimi 88'	Report	A.Abdullayev 17'; Mutallimov (yellow card) 39'; Naghiyev (yellow card) 76'; Khachayev (yellow card) 77'; Popovich (yellow card) 85'; Haghverdi (yellow card) 90+4'	Stadium: Gabala City Stadium; Referee: Rauf Jabarov

24 April 2022 24	Gabala	0 – 2	Qarabağ	Qabala
17:30 AZT (UTC+4)	Alimi (yellow card) 7'; Muradov (yellow card) 12'; Shahverdiyev (yellow card) 90+3'	Report	Wadji 6', 14'	Stadium: Gabala City Stadium; Referee: Ingilab Mammadov

4 May 2022 25	Zira	0 – 3	Gabala	Zirə
17:45 AZT (UTC+4)	Brogno (yellow card) 10'	Report	Mammadov (yellow card) 15'; López 26' (yellow card) 53'; Utzig 45' (yellow card) 90+1'; Isgandarov (yellow card) 71'; Hani 81'	Stadium: Zira Olympic Sport Complex Stadium; Referee: Raad Ahmadov

9 May 2022 26	Gabala	1 – 0	Neftçi	Qabala
19:45 AZT (UTC+4)	Mammadov (yellow card) 30'; Alimi 74' (pen.); Mirzayev (yellow card) 75'; Musayev (yellow card) 90+2'	Report	Bezerra (yellow card) 73'	Stadium: Gabala City Stadium; Referee: Farid Haciyev

15 May 2022 27	Shamakhi	0 – 1	Gabala	Baku
17:00 AZT (UTC+4)	Santos (yellow card) 11'; Gigauri (yellow card) 11'; E.Mustafayev (yellow card) 80'	Report	Ruan (yellow card) 11'; Isayev (yellow card) 11'; Mirzayev (yellow card) 11'; Alimi (yellow card) 14'; E.Səfərov 24'; López (yellow card) 45'	Stadium: ASK Arena; Referee: Elcin Masiyev
Note: On 6 April, Keşla changed their name to Shamakhi.

21 May 2022 28	Gabala	1 – 1	Sabah	Qabala
17:00 AZT (UTC+4)	Abbasov (yellow card) 5'; Musayev 68' (yellow card) 68'	Report	Kashchuk 86'	Stadium: Gabala City Stadium; Referee: Aliyar Aghayev

==== League table ====
Pos	Team	Pld	W	D	L	GF	GA	GD	Pts	Qualification
2	Neftçi Baku	28	15	5	8	42	31	+11	50	Qualification to Europa Conference League second qualifying round
3	Zira	28	13	8	7	33	27	+6	47	Qualification to Europa Conference League second qualifying round
4	Gabala	28	12	9	7	38	34	+4	45	Qualification to Europa Conference League second qualifying round
5	Sabah	28	12	5	11	42	34	+8	41	
6	Sumgayit	28	5	7	16	22	46	−24	22 (Note: Head-to-head points: Sumgayit 7, Shamakhi 4.)	

Source: Soccerway
Rules for classification: 1) Points; 2) Head-to-head points; 3) Head-to-head goal difference; 4) Head-to-head goals scored; 5) Head-to-head away goals scored (only if two teams); 6) Goal difference; 7) Goals scored.

=== Azerbaijan Cup ===
10 December 2021 First Round	MOIK Baku	1 – 2	Gabala	Baku
17:00 AZT (UTC+4)	I.Zeynalli (yellow card) 26'; I.Allahverdiyev 34' (yellow card) 53'; S.Alıyev (yellow card) 37'; E.Rəhimzadə (yellow card) 39'; E.Veysov (red card) 75'	Report	Mirzayev (yellow card) 32'; H.Mürsəlov (yellow card) 41'; Muradov 55'; Isgandarov 88'	Stadium: Lökbatan Olympic Sport Complex Stadium; Referee: Farid Haciyev

2 February 2022 Quarterfinal 1st leg	Sumgayit	0 – 1	Gabala	Sumgait
19:15 AZT (UTC+4)	Mustafayev (yellow card) 8'; Khachayev (yellow card) 50'; Abdullayev (yellow card) 65'; Nabiyev (yellow card) 85'	Report	Alimi 26' (pen.) (yellow card) 77'; Vukčević (yellow card) 86'; Shahverdiyev (yellow card) 90+1'	Stadium: Kapital Bank Arena; Referee: Rauf Jabarov

13 February 2022 Quarterfinal 2nd leg	Gabala	1 – 1 (2 – 1 agg.)	Sumgayit	Qabala
15:00 AZT (UTC+4)	Alimi 18'; López (yellow card) 64'; Mammadov (yellow card) 67'; Ruan (yellow card) 69'; Isgandarov (yellow card) 73'	Report	Mustafayev (yellow card) 52'; Haghverdi (yellow card) 70'; A.Abdullayev 82'; E.Abdullayev (yellow card) 90'	Stadium: Gabala City Stadium; Referee: Kamal Umudlu

20 April 2022 Semifinal 1st leg	Gabala	1 – 3	Qarabağ	Qabala
17:30 AZT (UTC+4)	Mammadov 6'; Vukčević (yellow card) 9'; Musayev (yellow card) 89'	Report	Ibrahimli 16'; Cafarguliyev (yellow card) 19'; Medina (yellow card) 53'; Sheydayev (yellow card) 58'; Medvedev (yellow card) 70'; Vešović (yellow card) 82'; Wadji 88'; Kady 90+1' (pen.)	Stadium: Gabala City Stadium; Referee: Kamal Umudlu

29 April 2022 Semifinal 2nd leg	Qarabağ	5 – 0 (8 – 1 agg.)	Gabala	Baku
17:30 AZT (UTC+4)	Sheydayev 5', 58'; Kady 13' (pen.), 17'; L.Andrade 37'	Report	Musayev (yellow card) 24'; Alimi (yellow card) 54'	Stadium: Azersun Arena; Referee: Elçin Məsiyev

== Squad statistics ==
As of match played 21 May 2022

=== Appearances and goals ===
No.	Pos	Nat	Player	Total		Premier League		Azerbaijan Cup	
No.	Pos	Nat	Player	Apps	Goals	Apps	Goals	Apps	Goals
1	GK	(Cameroon) CMR	Christophe Atangana	5	0	2	0	3	0
2	DF	(Azerbaijan) AZE	Samet Karakoc	1	0	0	0	1	0
4	DF	(Brazil) BRA	Ruan Renato	31	2	26	2	5	0
5	MF	(Albania) ALB	Isnik Alimi	32	10	27	8	4+1	2
6	MF	(Azerbaijan) AZE	Kamal Mirzayev	6	0	0+5	0	1	0
7	MF	(Azerbaijan) AZE	Ehtiram Shahverdiyev	17	1	3+10	1	2+2	0
8	MF	(Montenegro) MNE	Stefan Vukčević	30	0	22+4	0	3+1	0
9	MF	(Spain) ESP	Fernán López	19	1	14+2	1	3	0
10	MF	(Jordan) JOR	Omar Hani	25	2	16+5	2	3+1	0
11	MF	(Azerbaijan) AZE	Asif Mammadov	27	2	19+3	1	3+2	1
12	DF	(Azerbaijan) AZE	Rufat Ahmadov	10	0	6+2	0	1+1	0
14	FW	(Azerbaijan) AZE	Ulvi Isgandarov	33	7	3+25	6	1+4	1
17	MF	(Togo) TOG	Yaovi Akakpo	4	2	4	2	0	0
19	MF	(Azerbaijan) AZE	Rovlan Muradov	31	4	24+3	3	4	1
23	FW	(Brazil) BRA	Raphael Utzig	30	6	26	6	4	0
24	FW	(Brazil) BRA	Patrick	13	0	5+5	0	2+1	0
27	DF	(Azerbaijan) AZE	Magsad Isayev	31	1	27	1	4	0
28	DF	(Azerbaijan) AZE	Murad Musayev	30	2	26	2	3+1	0
33	DF	(Azerbaijan) AZE	Huseyn Mursalov	3	0	1+1	0	1	0
34	DF	(Azerbaijan) AZE	Urfan Abbasov	28	1	26	1	2	0
77	FW	(Azerbaijan) AZE	Emil Safarov	20	2	5+11	2	3+1	0
94	GK	(Azerbaijan) AZE	Nijat Mehbaliyev	28	0	26	0	2	0
Players away on loan:
Players who left Gabala during the season:

=== Goal scorers ===
Place	Position	Nation	Number	Name	Premier League	Azerbaijan Cup	Total
1	MF	(Albania)	5	Isnik Alimi	8	2	10
2	FW	(Azerbaijan)	14	Ulvi Isgandarov	6	1	7
3	FW	(Brazil)	23	Raphael Utzig	6	0	6
4	MF	(Azerbaijan)	19	Rovlan Muradov	3	1	4
5	MF	(Togo)	17	Yaovi Akakpo	2	0	2
5	DF	(Brazil)	4	Ruan Renato	2	0	2
5	MF	(Jordan)	10	Omar Hani	2	0	2
5	FW	(Azerbaijan)	77	Emil Safarov	2	0	2
5	DF	(Azerbaijan)	28	Murad Musayev	2	0	2
5	MF	(Azerbaijan)	11	Asif Mammadov	1	1	2
11	MF	(Azerbaijan)	7	Ehtiram Shahverdiyev	1	0	1
11	DF	(Azerbaijan)	27	Magsad Isayev	1	0	1
11	DF	(Azerbaijan)	34	Urfan Abbasov	1	0	1
11	MF	(Spain)	9	Fernán López	1	0	1
				TOTALS	38	5	43

=== Clean sheets ===
Place	Position	Nation	Number	Name	Premier League	Azerbaijan Cup	Total
1	GK	(Azerbaijan)	94	Nijat Mehbaliyev	11	1	12
				TOTALS	11	1	12

=== Disciplinary record ===
Number	Nation	Position	Name	Premier League		Azerbaijan Cup		Total	
Number	Nation	Position	Name	Yellow card	Red card	Yellow card	Red card	Yellow card	Red card
4	(Brazil)	DF	Ruan Renato	7	1	1	0	8	1
5	(Albania)	MF	Isnik Alimi	7	0	2	0	9	0
6	(Azerbaijan)	MF	Kamal Mirzayev	2	0	1	0	3	0
7	(Azerbaijan)	MF	Ehtiram Shahverdiyev	2	1	1	0	3	1
8	(Montenegro)	MF	Stefan Vukčević	9	1	2	0	11	1
9	(Spain)	MF	Fernán López	7	0	1	0	8	0
10	(Jordan)	MF	Omar Hani	3	1	0	0	3	1
11	(Azerbaijan)	MF	Asif Mammadov	6	0	1	0	7	0
12	(Azerbaijan)	DF	Rufat Ahmadov	3	0	0	0	3	0
14	(Azerbaijan)	FW	Ulvi Isgandarov	3	0	1	0	4	0
19	(Azerbaijan)	MF	Rovlan Muradov	4	0	0	0	4	0
23	(Brazil)	FW	Raphael Utzig	5	0	0	0	5	0
27	(Azerbaijan)	DF	Magsad Isayev	6	0	0	0	6	0
28	(Azerbaijan)	DF	Murad Musayev	5	0	2	0	7	0
33	(Azerbaijan)	DF	Huseyn Mursalov	0	0	1	0	1	0
34	(Azerbaijan)	DF	Urfan Abbasov	3	0	0	0	3	0
77	(Azerbaijan)	FW	Emil Safarov	3	0	0	0	3	0
94	(Azerbaijan)	GK	Nijat Mehbaliyev	3	0	0	0	3	0
Players who left Gabala during the season:
			TOTALS	78	4	13	0	91	4
