= 2021–22 Azerbaijan Cup =

Tournament details
- Country: Azerbaijan
- Teams: 12

Final positions
- Champions: Qarabağ
- Runners-up: Zira

Tournament statistics
- Matches played: 17
- Goals scored: 48 (2.82 per match)
- All statistics correct as of 27 May 2022.

The 2021–22 Azerbaijan Cup was the 30th season of the annual cup competition in Azerbaijan, with Premier League side Keşla being the defending champions from the 2020–21.

== Teams ==
| Round | Clubs remaining | Clubs involved | Winners from previous round | New entries this round | Leagues entering at this round |
|---|---|---|---|---|---|
| First Round | 8 | 8 | None | 8 | 4 Azerbaijan First Division teams 4 Azerbaijan Premier League teams |
| Quarterfinals | 4 | 8 | 4 | 4 | 4 Azerbaijan Premier League teams |
| Semifinals | 4 | 4 | 4 | none | none |
| Final | 2 | 2 | 2 | none | none |

== First round ==
| 10 December 2021 1 | Zagatala | 1 – 3 | Sabail | Zaqatala |
| 14:00 AZT (UTC+4) | R.İsmayilov (yellow card) 7' (goal) 57'; R.Şabanov (yellow card) 45'; E.Şirinov (yellow card) 57'; O.Soltanov (yellow card) 66' | Report | Abbasov 48', 90+2'; Ismayilov 67' (pen.) | Stadium: Zaqatala City Stadium; Referee: Tural Gurbanov |

| 10 December 2021 2 | MOIK Baku | 1 – 2 | Gabala | Baku |
| 17:00 AZT (UTC+4) | I.Zeynalli (yellow card) 26'; I.Allahverdiyev 34' (yellow card) 53'; S.Alıyev (yellow card) 37'; E.Rəhimzadə (yellow card) 39'; E.Veysov (red card) 75' | Report | Mirzayev (yellow card) 32'; H.Mürsəlov (yellow card) 41'; Muradov 55'; Isgandarov 88' | Stadium: Lökbatan Olympic Sport Complex Stadium; Referee: Farid Haciyev |

| 11 December 2021 3 | Keşla | 2 – 1 | Qaradağ Lökbatan | Baku |
| 15:00 AZT (UTC+4) | S.Abdullayev 32'; Hajiyev 58'; Felipe Santos (yellow card) 88' | Report | E.Samadov 7'; S.Allahquliyev (yellow card) 13'; U.İsmayılov (yellow card) 60' | Stadium: ASK Arena; Referee: Rauf Allahverdiyev |

| 11 December 2021 4 | Sabah | 3 – 0 | Kapaz | Masazır |
| 18:00 AZT (UTC+4) | Camalov (yellow card) 45+4'; Mickels 57', 61'; Isayev (yellow card) 71'; Alkhasov (yellow card) 81'; K.Quliyev 90+2' | Report | B.Teymurov (yellow card) 8'; U.Samadov (yellow card) 60' | Stadium: Bank Respublika Arena; Referee: Nicat İsmayıllı |

== Quarterfinals ==
| 1 February 2022 5 1st leg | Qarabağ | 1 – 0 | Keşla | Baku |
| 17:30 AZT (UTC+4) | Ozobić (yellow card) 45+2'; Wadji 56'; L.Andrade (yellow card) 79'; Bayramov (yellow card) 90+4' | Report | Muradbayli (yellow card) 14'; Flores (yellow card) 65'; Guliyev (yellow card) 90+5' | Stadium: Azersun Arena; Referee: Vuqar Hasanli |

| 11 February 2022 5 2nd leg | Keşla | 0 – 6 (0 – 7 agg.) | Qarabağ | Baku |
| 18:00 AZT (UTC+4) | Gigauri (yellow card) 44'; Valizade (yellow card) 83' | Report | P.Andrade 9'; Wadji 17', 45'; Sheydayev 43' (pen.), 84'; Gurbanlı 78' | Stadium: ASK Arena; Referee: Elcin Masiyev |

| 1 February 2022 6 1st leg | Neftçi | 1 – 1 | Sabah | Baku |
| 19:45 AZT (UTC+4) | Stanković 41'; Ramon (yellow card) 70'; Israfilov (yellow card) 74'; Mahmudov (yellow card) 86' | Report | Rodríguez (yellow card) 29'; Mickels 50' (yellow card) 54'; Ochihava (yellow card) 70' | Stadium: Eighth Kilometer District Stadium; Referee: Aliyar Agayev |

| 12 February 2022 6 2nd leg | Sabah | 1 – 3 (2 – 4 agg.) | Neftçi | Masazır |
| 16:00 AZT (UTC+4) | Nuriyev (yellow card) 34'; Cámara 42'; Rodríguez (yellow card) 70'; Isayev (red card) 75'; Aghayev (red card) 75'; Mickels (yellow card) 76'; M.Ergemlidze (yellow card) 76'; Ochihava (yellow card) 90+9' | Report | Najafov (yellow card) 22'; Mahmudov 61'; Ramon 62', 68'; Israfilov (yellow card) 74' | Stadium: Bank Respublika Arena; Referee: Ravan Hamzazada |

| 2 February 2022 7 1st leg | Zira | 4 – 0 | Sabail | Zirə |
| 17:00 AZT (UTC+4) | Hamdaoui 45+2'; Brogno 59', 86'; Volkovi (yellow card) 66'; Keyta 72' | Report | Goxha (yellow card) 66' | Stadium: Zira Olympic Sport Complex Stadium; Referee: Kamal Umudlu |

| 13 February 2022 7 2nd leg | Sabail | 1 – 3 (1 – 7 agg.) | Zira | Baku |
| 18:00 AZT (UTC+4) | V.Cəfərov (yellow card) 3'; Hajiyev 7'; Rahimli (yellow card) 75' | Report | Alceus (yellow card) 16'; Ramazanov 21'; R.Ahmedov (yellow card) 27'; Khalilzade 39' (pen.); Diniyev 73' | Stadium: Bayil Arena; Referee: Aliyar Agayev |

| 2 February 2022 8 1st leg | Sumgayit | 0 – 1 | Gabala | Sumgait |
| 19:15 AZT (UTC+4) | Mustafayev (yellow card) 8'; Khachayev (yellow card) 50'; Abdullayev (yellow card) 65'; Nabiyev (yellow card) 85' | Report | Alimi 26' (pen.) (yellow card) 77'; Vukčević (yellow card) 86'; Shahverdiyev (yellow card) 90+1' | Stadium: Kapital Bank Arena; Referee: Rauf Jabarov |

| 13 February 2022 8 2nd leg | Gabala | 1 – 1 (2 – 1 agg.) | Sumgayit | Qabala |
| 15:00 AZT (UTC+4) | Alimi 18'; López (yellow card) 64'; Mammadov (yellow card) 67'; Ruan (yellow card) 69'; Isgandarov (yellow card) 73' | Report | Mustafayev (yellow card) 52'; Haghverdi (yellow card) 70'; A.Abdullayev 82'; E.Abdullayev (yellow card) 90' | Stadium: Gabala City Stadium; Referee: Kamal Umudlu |

== Semi–finals ==
| 20 April 2022 9 1stleg | Gabala | 1 – 3 | Qarabağ | Qabala |
| 17:30 AZT (UTC+4) | Mammadov 6'; Vukčević (yellow card) 9'; Musayev (yellow card) 89' | Report | Ibrahimli 16'; Cafarguliyev (yellow card) 19'; Medina (yellow card) 53'; Sheydayev (yellow card) 58'; Medvedev (yellow card) 70'; Vešović (yellow card) 82'; Wadji 88'; Kady 90+1' (pen.) | Stadium: Gabala City Stadium; Referee: Kamal Umudlu |

| 29 April 2022 9 2nd leg | Qarabağ | 5 – 0 (8 – 1 agg.) | Gabala | Baku |
| 17:30 AZT (UTC+4) | Sheydayev 5', 58'; Kady 13' (pen.), 17'; L.Andrade 37' | Report | Musayev (yellow card) 24'; Alimi (yellow card) 54' | Stadium: Azersun Arena; Referee: Elçin Məsiyev |

| 20 April 2022 10 1st leg | Zira | 0 – 0 | Neftçi | Zirə |
| 20:00 AZT (UTC+4) | | Report | Colli (yellow card) 83' | Stadium: Zira Olympic Sport Complex Stadium; Referee: Rauf Jabarov |

| 29 April 2022 10 2nd leg | Neftçi | 0 – 0 (0 – 0 agg.) (2 – 4 p) | Zira | Baku |
| 20:30 AZT (UTC+4) | Yusifli (yellow card) 49' | Report | Chantakias (yellow card) 28'; Khalilzade (yellow card) 61' | Stadium: Eighth Kilometer District Stadium; Referee: Aliyar Agayev |
| | Penalties |
| | Mahmudov (penalty scored); Bezerra (penalty scored); Israfilov (penalty missed); Pato (penalty missed) | | Keyta (penalty scored); Khalilzade (penalty scored); Aliyev (penalty scored); Volkovi (penalty scored) |

== Final ==
| 27 May 2022 | Qarabağ | 1 – 1 (a.e.t.) (4 – 3 p) | Zira | Qabala |
| 19:00 (UTC+4) | Zoubir 69'; Garayev (yellow card) 87' | Report | Keyta 17' (yellow card) 120+1'; Chantakias (yellow card) 59'; Nazirov (yellow card) 85'; Hajili (yellow card) 103'; Ramazanov (yellow card) 114' | Stadium: Gabala City Stadium; Referee: Aliyar Aghayev |
| | Penalties |
| | Garayev (penalty scored); Medvedev (penalty scored); Kady (penalty missed); Bayramov (penalty scored); Sheydayev (penalty scored) | | Keyta (penalty scored); Volkovi (penalty missed); Isaiah (penalty scored); Hüseynov (penalty scored); Taşqın (penalty missed) |

== Scorers ==
As of match played 27 May 2022

4 goals:

- (Senegal) Ibrahima Wadji - Qarabağ
- (Azerbaijan) Ramil Sheydayev - Qarabağ

3 goals:

- (Germany) Joy-Lance Mickels - Sabah
- (Brazil) Kady - Qarabağ

2 goals:

- (Albania) Isnik Alimi - Gabala
- (Brazil) Ramon - Neftçi
- (Azerbaijan) Mirsahib Abbasov - Sabail
- (Belgium) Loris Brogno - Zira
- (France) Hamidou Keyta - Zira

1 goals:

- (Azerbaijan) Ulvi Isgandarov - Gabala
- (Azerbaijan) Asif Mammadov - Gabala
- (Azerbaijan) Rovlan Muradov - Gabala
- (Azerbaijan) Samir Abdullayev - Keşla
- (Azerbaijan) Rahman Hajiyev - Keşla
- (Azerbaijan) İlham Allahverdiyev - MOIK Baku
- (Azerbaijan) Emin Mahmudov - Neftçi
- (Serbia) Vojislav Stanković - Neftçi
- (Azerbaijan) Musa Gurbanlı - Qarabağ
- (Azerbaijan) Ismayil Ibrahimli - Qarabağ
- (Cape Verde) Leandro Andrade - Qarabağ
- (Cape Verde) Patrick Andrade - Qarabağ
- (France) Abdellah Zoubir - Qarabağ
- (Azerbaijan) Elnur Samadov - Qaradağ Lökbatan
- (Azerbaijan) Kamran Quliyev - Sabah
- (Spain) Juan Cámara - Sabah
- (Azerbaijan) Ruslan Hajiyev - Sabail
- (Azerbaijan) Afran Ismayilov - Sabail
- (Azerbaijan) Araz Abdullayev - Sumgayit
- (Azerbaijan) Roini İsmayilov - Zagatala
- (Azerbaijan) Coşqun Diniyev - Zira
- (Azerbaijan) Tamkin Khalilzade - Zira
- (Azerbaijan) Aghabala Ramazanov - Zira
- (Netherlands) Mo Hamdaoui - Zira

== See also ==
- 2021–22 Azerbaijan Premier League
- 2021–22 Azerbaijan First Division
