= Omar Hani =

Jordanian footballer

Personal information
- Full name: Omar Hani Ismail Al Zebdieh
- Date of birth: 27 June 1999 (age 27)
- Place of birth: Zarqa, Jordan
- Height: 1.68 m (5 ft 6 in)
- Position: Winger

Team information
- Current team: Al-Faisaly

Youth career
- –2018: Al-Faisaly

Senior career*
Years	Team	Apps	(Gls)
2018–2019	Al-Faisaly	7	(2)
2019–2021	APOEL	2	(0)
2020–2021	→ Olympiakos Nicosia (loan)	18	(0)
2021–2024	Gabala	71	(3)
2024	Doxa Katokopias	19	(0)
2024–	Al-Faisaly	18	(4)

International career^{‡}
2018	Jordan U19	3	(0)
2019–	Jordan U23	6	(2)
2019–	Jordan	2	(0)
- * Club domestic league appearances and goals as of 8 May 2026 ‡ National team caps and goals as of 06:53, 6 June 2022 (UTC)

Omar Hani Ismail Al Zebdieh (Arabic: عمر هاني اسماعيل الزبدية; born 27 June 1999) is a Jordanian professional footballer who plays as a winger for Al-Faisaly and the Jordan national team.

== Career ==
=== Gabala FK ===
On 1 September 2021, Gabala announced the signing of Hani to a one-year contract, with the option of an additional year, from APOEL. On 22 June 2022, Gabala announced that they had extended Hani's contract for an additional year. On 24 June 2023, Hans extended his contract with Gabala until the summer of 2024. On 9 January 2024, Gabala announced that Hani had left the club by mutual consent.

=== Doxa Katokopias ===
On 19 January 2024, Doxa Katokopias announced the signing of Hani.

=== Al-Faisaly SC ===
On 12 July 2024, Al-Faisaly announced the signing of Hani for two seasons.

== Career statistics ==
=== Club ===
As of match played 22 December 2023

Appearances and goals by club, season and competition
Club	Season	League			National Cup		Continental		Other		Total	
Club	Season	Division	Apps	Goals	Apps	Goals	Apps	Goals	Apps	Goals	Apps	Goals
APOEL	2019–20	Cypriot First Division	1	0	0	0	-		0 (Note: Appearances in the Cypriot Super Cup)	0	1	0
APOEL	2020–21	Cypriot First Division	1	0	0	0	0 (Note: Appearances in the UEFA Europa League)	0	-		1	0
APOEL	Total		2	0	0	0	0	0	0	0	2	0
Olympiakos Nicosia (loan)	2020–21	Cypriot First Division	18	0	4	2	—		—		22	2
Gabala	2021–22	Azerbaijan Premier League	21	2	4	0	—		—		25	2
Gabala	2022–23	Azerbaijan Premier League	33	1	5	1	2 (Note: Appearances in the UEFA Europa Conference League)	0	—		40	2
Gabala	2023–24	Azerbaijan Premier League	17	0	1	0	2	0	—		20	0
Gabala	Total		71	3	10	1	4	0	-	-	85	4
Career total			91	3	14	3	4	0	0	0	109	6
