= Khazar Mahmudov =

Azerbaijani footballer (born 2000)

Personal information
- Date of birth: 23 November 2000 (age 25)
- Place of birth: Azerbaijan
- Position: Forward

Youth career
- Keşla

Senior career*
Years	Team	Apps	(Gls)
2019–2021	Keşla	3	(0)
2021–2023	Sumgayit	14	(0)
2023–2024	İmişli		
2024	Karvan		
- * Club domestic league appearances and goals as of 1 January 2025

Khazar Mahmudov (Azerbaijani: Xəzər Mahmudov; born on 23 November 2000) is an Azerbaijani professional footballer who plays as a midfielder.

== Club career ==
On 6 December 2019, Mahmudov made his debut in the Azerbaijan Premier League for Keşla match against Qarabağ.

On 9 July 2024, Karvan announced the signing of a one-year contract with Mahmudov. On 29 December 2024, they reached an agreement to terminate the contract.
