= Murad Musayev (footballer) =

Azerbaijani footballer (born 1994)

Personal information
- Full name: Murad Şöhrət oğlu Musayev
- Date of birth: 13 June 1994 (age 32)
- Place of birth: Baku, Azerbaijan
- Height: 1.80 m (5 ft 11 in)
- Position: Centre-back

Youth career
- Gabala

Senior career*
Years	Team	Apps	(Gls)
2013–2016	Gabala	8	(0)
2017	Sabail	1	(0)
2018	Shuvalan	16	(0)
2018–2019	Zira	1	(0)
2019–2026	Gabala	155	(7)

International career^{‡}
2012	Azerbaijan U19	1	(0)
- * Club domestic league appearances and goals as of 4 June 2026 ‡ National team caps and goals as of 22 September 2020

Murad Şöhrət oğlu Musayev (born on 13 June 1994) is an Azerbaijani footballer who plays as a defender, most recently for Gabala in the Azerbaijan Premier League.

== Club career ==
On 28 April 2013, Musayev made his debut in the Azerbaijan Premier League for Gabala match against Qarabağ.

On 6 June 2023, Musayev extended his contract with Gabala for an additional two-years. On 4 June 2026, Gabala announced that Musayev had left the club after his contract had expired.

== Career statistics ==
=== Club ===
As of match played 28 May 2026

Appearances and goals by club, season and competition
Club	Season	League			Cup		Continental		Other		Total	
Club	Season	Division	Apps	Goals	Apps	Goals	Apps	Goals	Apps	Goals	Apps	Goals
Gabala	2012–13	Azerbaijan Premier League	1	0	0	0	—				1	0
Gabala	2013–14	Azerbaijan Premier League	0	0	1	0	—				1	0
Gabala	2014–15	Azerbaijan Premier League	2	0	0	0	0 (Note: Appearances and goals in the UEFA Europa League)	0	—		2	0
Gabala	2015–16	Azerbaijan Premier League	1	0	0	0	0	0	—		1	0
Gabala	2016–17	Azerbaijan Premier League	4	0	0	0	0	0	—		4	0
Gabala	Total		8	0	1	0	0	0	-	-	9	0
Sabail	2017–18	Azerbaijan Premier League	1	0	3	0	—				4	0
Shuvalan	2017–18	Azerbaijan First Division	16	0	0	0	—				16	0
Zira	2018–19	Azerbaijan Premier League	1	0	0	0	—				1	0
Gabala	2019–20	Azerbaijan Premier League	8	0	1	0	0	0	—		9	0
Gabala	2020–21	Azerbaijan Premier League	18	0	2	0	—				20	0
Gabala	2021–22	Azerbaijan Premier League	26	2	4	0	—				30	2
Gabala	2022–23	Azerbaijan Premier League	30	1	5	0	1	0	—		36	1
Gabala	2023–24	Azerbaijan Premier League	29	1	4	0	2	0	—		35	1
Gabala	2024–25	Azerbaijan First Division	18	3	2	0	—				20	3
Gabala	2025–26	Azerbaijan Premier League	30	0	4	0	—		1	0	35	0
Gabala	Total		159	7	22	0	3	0	1	0	185	7
Career total			195	7	26	0	3	0	1	0	215	7
