= Isnik Alimi =

Footballer (born 1994)

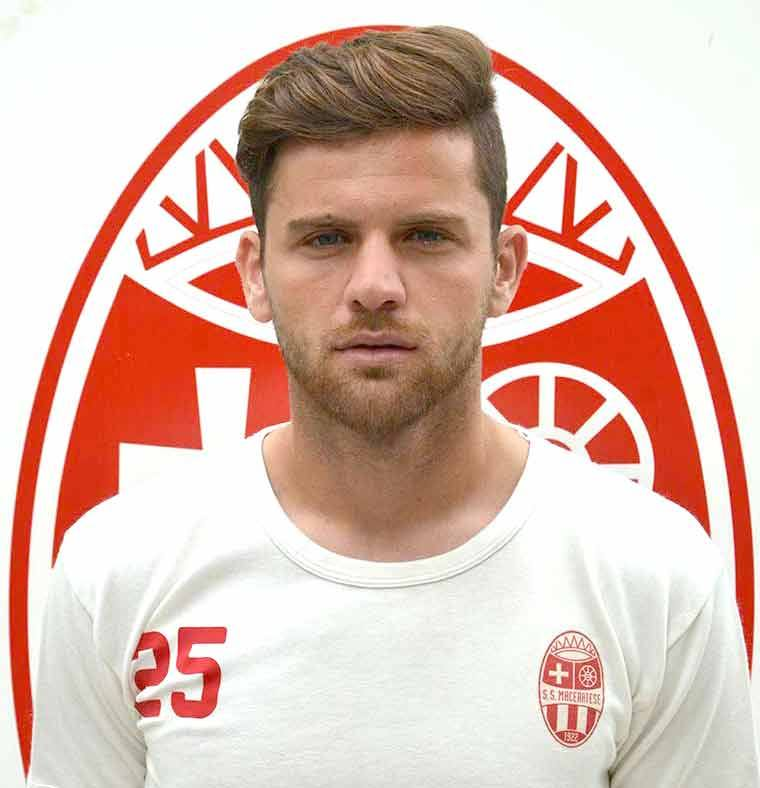
- Alimi with Maceratese

Personal information
- Full name: Isnik Alimi
- Date of birth: 2 February 1994 (age 32)
- Place of birth: Delogoždi, Macedonia
- Height: 1.86 m (6 ft 1 in)
- Position: Midfielder

Team information
- Current team: Dalian Yingbo
- Number: 4

Youth career
- 2001–2010: Vllaznimi Struga
- 2010–2011: Ohrid
- 2013–2014: Chievo

Senior career*
Years	Team	Apps	(Gls)
2011	Ohrid	14	(2)
2012–2013	Novigrad	4	(2)
2014–2015	Chievo	0	(0)
2014–2015	→ Lumezzane (loan)	26	(2)
2015–2021	Atalanta	0	(0)
2015–2016	→ Maceratese (loan)	13	(0)
2016–2017	→ Forlì (loan)	29	(0)
2017–2018	→ Vicenza (loan)	30	(1)
2018–2019	→ Rimini (loan)	31	(0)
2019–2020	→ Imolese (loan)	23	(0)
2020–2021	→ Šibenik (loan)	24	(0)
2021–2023	Gabala	61	(17)
2023–2025	Sepsi OSK	45	(10)
2025–	Dalian Yingbo	52	(2)

International career^{‡}
2011–2012	Macedonia U19	6	(2)
2014–2016	Albania U21	6	(0)
2023–	North Macedonia	16	(2)
- * Club domestic league appearances and goals as of 19 November 2026 ‡ National team caps and goals as of 12 June 2025

Isnik Alimi (Macedonian: Исник Алими; born 2 February 1994) is a professional footballer who plays as a central midfielder for Chinese Super League club Dalian Yingbo and for the North Macedonia national team. A former international for Macedonia U19, he played for the Albania U21 in a pair of friendlies before switching back to play for the North Macedonia national team in 2023.

== Club career ==
=== Early career - FK Ohrid ===
Born in Delogoždi (Albanian: Dollogozhda) a village based in Struga Municipality, Alimi started his youth career aged 7 with Macedonian side Vllaznimi Struga. In 2010, he moved at FK Ohrid and in 2011 he was promoted to the first team. On 30 July 2011, Alimi made his debut with the first team coming as a substitute in place of Aleksandar Dalčeski in second-half's start of the match finished in a 2–0 away loss against Renova for the Macedonian First League championship.

=== Chievo ===
In 2013, he moved abroad for the first time joining Serie A side Chievo. He stood for a year season with Primavera team.

With Primvaera team he won Italian Superleague, he score a goal against Juventus in the first game, also mark the goal against Fiorentina in the semifinals, he helped lead his team to winning the championship because Isnik Alimi was the team captain and key player. He had 21 matches and 10 goals with Primavera team.

==== Loan to Lumezzane ====
On 6 August 2014, the Lega Pro Prima Divisione side A.C. Lumezzane, announced to have signed Alimi from Chievo on loan mode.

He made it his professional debut on 31 August 2014, playing as a starter in the opening match of the Lega Pro against Pordenone, finished in the clean 2–0 victory.

He finished his first half of the season with Lumezzane with 12 appearances, 8 as a starter and 4 coming on as a substitute.

Alimi scored his first goal for Lumezzane in the opening match of the year 2015 against Novara valid for the 19th game week, played on 6 January and finished in the away 3–1 victory, in where Alimi scored the second goal for 2–0 result in the 45th minute in the end of first half.

Alimi concluded the 2014–15 season making in total 27 appearances, from where 21 in the starting line up, scored 2 goals and provided 3 assists.

=== Atalanta ===
After one-year loaned to Lumezzane, Alimi got returned to Chievo, but on 26 June 2015 he signed with the fellow Serie A team Atalanta B.C. a 4-years contract.

==== Loan to Maceratese ====
In the closing day of the 2015 Summer Transfers Window Alimi got loaned out to the Lega Pro just promoted side S.S. Maceratese 1922.

==== Loan to Vicenza ====
In the 2017 Summer Transfers Window, Alimi was loaned out for the third time to Lega Pro at Vicenza.

==== Loan to Imolese ====
On 9 August 2019, he joined Serie C club Imolese on a season-long loan.

==== Loan to Šibenik ====
On 18 September 2020, Alimi joined Croatian First Football League club HNK Šibenik on a season-long loan.

=== Gabala ===
On 30 July 2021, Alimi signed a one-year contract with Gabala. On 22 May 2022, Gabala announced that Alimi had signed a new one-year contract with the club.

== International career ==
=== Albania ===
Having played for Macedonia U19, Alimi was called up higher from Macedonia national under-21 football team for the friendly match against Israel on 13 August 2014, but he refused the invitation as he wanted to play for Albania instead at international level due to his ethnicity. On 24 September 2014 proceedings were begun to give him the Albanian passport to be eligible to play for Albania at an international level. He received his first call up for Albania by Skënder Gega, the Albania national under-21 football team coach for the Friendly match against Romania U21 on 8 October 2014.

He made his debut for Albania U21 in the Friendly match against Romania U21 on 8 October 2014 by playing as a starter in a 3–1 loss, where he started his team's first attempt to the goal of in the 11th minute by running from the midfield and shooting as soon as he got close to the 16-meters area, a shot which was put by the Romania U21s' goalkeeper in the corner kick.

Alimi was called up for the first time to participate in a competitive match, the 2017 UEFA European Under-21 Championship qualification opening match against Liechtenstein U21 on 28 March 2015, however, Alimi failed to play in this match as he was ineligible due to the absence of respective documents.

== Career statistics ==
=== Club ===
As of match played 31 May 2026

Appearances and goals by club, season and competition
Club	Season	League			National Cup		Continental		Other (Note: Appearances in Serie C-Relegation play-offs) (Note: Appearances in Supercupa României)		Total	
Club	Season	Division	Apps	Goals	Apps	Goals	Apps	Goals	Apps	Goals	Apps	Goals
Ohrid	2011–12	1. MFL	14	2	0	0	—		—		14	2
Novigrad	2012–13	2. NL	4	2	0	0	—		—		4	2
Lumezzane (loan)	2014–15	Lega Pro	26	2	2	1	—		1	0	29	3
Maceratese (loan)	2015–16	Lega Pro	13	0	0	0	—		—		13	0
Forlì (loan)	2016–17	Lega Pro	29	0	0	0	—		2	1	31	1
Vicenza (loan)	2017–18	Serie C	30	1	3	0	—		2	1	35	2
Rimini (loan)	2018–19	Serie C	31	0	2	0	—		2	1	35	1
Imolese (loan)	2019–20	Serie C	23	0	3	1	—		2	0	28	1
Šibenik (loan)	2020–21	HNL	24	0	2	0	—		—		26	0
Gabala	2021–22	Azerbaijan Premier League	27	8	5	2	—		—		32	10
Gabala	2022–23	Azerbaijan Premier League	34	9	5	3	2 (Note: Appearances and goals in the UEFA Europa Conference League)	0	—		41	12
Gabala	Total		61	17	10	5	2	0	—		73	22
Sepsi OSK	2023–24	Liga I	28	6	3	0	6	3	0	0	37	9
Sepsi OSK	2024–25	Liga I	17	4	1	0	—		—		18	4
Sepsi OSK	Total		45	10	4	0	6	3	0	0	55	13
Dalian Yingbo	2025	Chinese Super League	25	0	1	0	—		—		26	0
Dalian Yingbo	2026	Chinese Super League	13	1	0	0	—		—		13	1
Dalian Yingbo	Total		38	1	1	0	—		—		39	1
Career total			338	35	27	7	8	3	9	3	382	48

=== International ===
As of match played 17 November 2024

Appearances and goals by national team and year
National team	Year	Apps	Goals
North Macedonia
North Macedonia	2023	5	0
North Macedonia	2024	8	2
Total		13	2

As of match played 13 October 2024. North Macedonia score listed first, score column indicates score after each Alimi goal.

International goals by date, venue, cap, opponent, score, result and competition
No.	Date	Venue	Cap	Opponent	Score	Result	Competition
1	10 June 2024	Malšovická aréna, Hradec Králové, Czech Republic	7	Czech Republic	1–1	1–2	Friendly
2	13 October 2024	Vazgen Sargsyan Republican Stadium, Yerevan, Armenia	11	Armenia	2–0	2–0	2024–25 UEFA Nations League C

== Honours ==
Gabala

- Azerbaijan Cup: 2022–23

Sepsi OSK

- Supercupa României: 2023

Dalian Yingbo

- Chinese Super League: 2026
