= Dmytro Nahiyev =

Ukrainian footballer (born 1995)

Personal information
- Full name: Dmytro Ruslanovych Nahiyev
- Date of birth: 27 November 1995 (age 30)
- Place of birth: Bila Tserkva, Ukraine
- Height: 1.76 m (5 ft 9 in)
- Position: Right-back

Team information
- Current team: Muras United
- Number: 3

Youth career
- 2008: Youth Sportive School #15 Kyiv
- 2009–2011: Knyazha Shchaslyve

Senior career*
Years	Team	Apps	(Gls)
2012–2017	Dnipro Dnipropetrovsk	13	(1)
2017–2018	Karabakh Wien	15	(1)
2018	Sumgayit	0	(0)
2018	Stumbras	1	(0)
2018	→ Stumbras B	9	(1)
2020–2021	Dinamo-Auto Tiraspol	21	(1)
2021–2022	Sumgayit	31	(0)
2022–2023	Inhulets Petrove	27	(0)
2023–2024	Obolon Kyiv	20	(0)
2024	Mynai	5	(0)
2025–	Muras United		

International career^{‡}
2015–2016	Azerbaijan U21	2	(0)
- * Club domestic league appearances and goals as of 27 March 2025 ‡ National team caps and goals as of 4 August 2023

Dmytro Ruslanovych Nahiyev (Azerbaijani: Dmitri Ruslan oğlu Nağıyev; Ukrainian: Дмитро Русланович Нагієв; born 27 November 1995) is a professional footballer who plays as a right-back for Muras United. Born in Ukraine, he has represented Azerbaijan at youth international level.

== Career ==
Nahiyev is a product of the Youth Sportive School #15 Kyiv and FC Knyazha Shchaslyve systems.

He made his debut for FC Dnipro in the match against FC Vorskla Poltava on 20 November 2016 in the Ukrainian Premier League.

On 3 July 2018, Nahiyev signed a one-year contract with Sumgayit FK. On 4 August 2018, Nahiyev left Sumgayit FK.

Defender joined Lithuanian A Lyga club Stumbras for the rest of the 2018 season and debuted on 1 September 2018, during 2018 Lithuanian Football Cup quarter-final match against Viltis. He spent most of the year playing for the Stumbras B team in the I Lyga, making only single league appearance for the main team.

On 2 July 2022 he signed for Inhulets Petrove.

On 5 March 2025, Kyrgyz Premier League club Muras United, list Nahiyev as part of their squad list for the 2025 season.

== Personal life ==
Nahiyev was born in Ukraine and is Ukrainian from his father's side (though his surname sounds like Azerbaijani) and half-Ukrainian half-Azerbaijani from his mother's side.
