= Cəlal Hüseynov =

Azerbaijani footballer (born 2003)

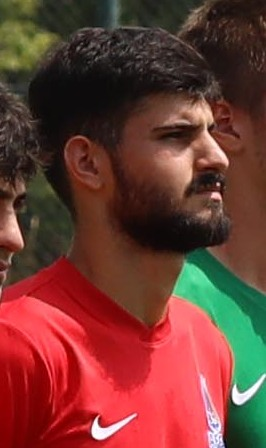
- Hüseynov in 2022

Personal information
- Full name: Cəlal Hakim oğlu Hüseynov
- Date of birth: 2 January 2003 (age 23)
- Place of birth: Baku, Azerbaijan
- Height: 1.85 m (6 ft 1 in)
- Positions: Defensive midfielder; centre-back

Team information
- Current team: Petrolul Ploiești
- Number: 18

Youth career
- –2019: Zira

Senior career*
Years	Team	Apps	(Gls)
2020–2023	Zira	35	(1)
2022–2023	→ Shamakhi (loan)	33	(0)
2023–2026	Arda Kardzhali	73	(4)
2025	→ Shamakhi (loan)	17	(1)
2026–	Petrolul Ploiești	11	(0)

International career^{‡}
2019	Azerbaijan U17	5	(0)
2021	Azerbaijan U19	3	(0)
2021–2024	Azerbaijan U21	21	(0)
2021–	Azerbaijan	13	(0)
- * Club domestic league appearances and goals as of 6 November 2026 ‡ National team caps and goals as of 16 November 2026

Cəlal Hakim oğlu Hüseynov (born 2 January 2003) is an Azerbaijani professional footballer who plays as a defensive midfielder or a centre-back for Liga I club Petrolul Ploiești and the Azerbaijan national team.

== Club career ==
Hüseynov made his debut in the Azerbaijan Premier League for Zira on 25 October 2020, in a match against Qarabağ. In June 2023, he joined Bulgarian team Arda Kardzhali.

Shamakhi announced on 27 December 2024 that they had signed Hüseynov on loan from Arda until the end of the season.

== International career ==
He made his debut for the Azerbaijan national football team on 14 November 2021 in a friendly against Qatar.

== Career statistics ==
=== Club ===
As of match played 6 November 2026

Club	Season	League			National cup (Note: Includes Azerbaijan Cup, Bulgarian Cup, Cupa României)		Europe		Other		Total	
Club	Season	Division	Apps	Goals	Apps	Goals	Apps	Goals	Apps	Goals	Apps	Goals
Zira	2022–23	Azerbaijan Premier League	0	0	1	0	–		–		1	0
Zira	2020–21	Azerbaijan Premier League	9	0	1	0	–		–		10	0
Zira	2021–22	Azerbaijan Premier League	26	1	4	0	–		–		30	1
Zira	2022–23	Azerbaijan Premier League	0	0	–		1 (Note: Appearances in UEFA Conference League)	0	–		0	0
Zira	Total		35	1	6	0	1	0	–		42	1
Shamakhi (loan)	2022–23	Azerbaijan Premier League	33	0	1	0	–		–		34	0
Arda Kardzhali	2023–24	Bulgarian First League	32	1	2	0	–		–		34	1
Arda Kardzhali	2024–25	Bulgarian First League	13	0	1	0	–		–		14	0
Arda Kardzhali	2025–26	Bulgarian First League	28	3	5	1	6	0	–		39	4
Arda Kardzhali	Total		73	4	8	1	6	0	–		87	5
Shamakhi (loan)	2024–25	Azerbaijan Premier League	17	1	–		–		–		17	1
Petrolul Ploiești	2026–27	Liga I	11	0	2	0	–		–		13	0
Career total			169	6	17	1	7	0	–		193	7

=== International ===
As of match played 16 November 2026

Appearances and goals by national team and year
National team	Year	Apps	Goals
Azerbaijan
Azerbaijan	2021	1	0
Azerbaijan	2022	3	0
Azerbaijan	2023	1	0
Azerbaijan	2024	0	0
Azerbaijan	2025	3	0
Azerbaijan	2026	5	0
Total		13	0

== Honours ==
Zira

- Azerbaijan Cup runner-up: 2021–22
