= Fernán López =

Spanish footballer (born 1995)

Personal information
- Full name: Fernán Ferreiroa López
- Date of birth: 10 February 1995 (age 31)
- Place of birth: Nigrán, Spain
- Height: 1.69 m (5 ft 7 in)
- Position: Midfielder

Team information
- Current team: Sloga Doboj
- Number: 8

Senior career*
Years	Team	Apps	(Gls)
2012–2015	Celta Vigo B	36	(0)
2015	→ Compostela (loan)	3	(0)
2015–2016	Choco	0	(0)
2016–2018	Gimnástica Segoviana	36	(2)
2018–2019	Barakaldo	22	(1)
2019–2020	Gabala	18	(3)
2020–2021	Jagiellonia	11	(0)
2020	Jagiellonia II	2	(1)
2021–2022	Gabala	16	(1)
2022–2023	Enosis Neon Paralimni	6	(0)
2024–2025	Gimnástica Segoviana	29	(1)
2025–2026	Rudar Prijedor	21	(0)
2026–	Sloga Doboj	8	(0)
- * Club domestic league appearances and goals as of 20 September 2026

Fernán Ferreiroa López (born 10 February 1995) is a Spanish professional footballer who plays as a midfielder for Bosnian Premier League club Sloga Doboj.

== Club career ==
On 17 August 2019, López made his debut in the Azerbaijan Premier League for Gabala match against Sumgayit.

On 19 September 2020, López signed a one-year contract with Polish club Jagiellonia Białystok.

On 8 October 2021, López returned to Gabala during the summer of 2021, on a contract until the summer of 2022.

López joined Cypriot First Division club Enosis Neon Paralimni on 29 June 2022.

== Career statistics ==
As of match played 20 September 2026

Appearances and goals by club, season and competition
Club	Season	League			National cup (Note: Includes Copa del Rey, Azerbaijan Cup, Cypriot Cup)		Continental		Total	
Club	Season	Division	Apps	Goals	Apps	Goals	Apps	Goals	Apps	Goals
Celta Vigo B	2011–12	Segunda División B	1	0	—		—		1	0
Celta Vigo B	2013–14	Segunda División B	29	0	—		—		29	0
Celta Vigo B	2014–15	Segunda División B	6	0	—		—		6	0
Celta Vigo B	Total		36	0	—		—		36	0
Compostela (loan)	2014–15	Segunda División B	3	0	—		—		3	0
Gimnástica Segoviana	2017–18	Segunda División B	36	2	2	0	—		38	2
Barakaldo	2018–19	Segunda División B	22	1	1	0	—		23	1
Gabala	2019–20	Azerbaijan Premier League	18	3	2	0	2 (Note: Appearances in UEFA Europa League)	0	22	3
Jagiellonia Białystok	2020–21	Ekstraklasa	11	0	—		—		11	0
Jagiellonia Białystok II	2020–21	III liga	2	1	—		—		2	1
Gabala	2021–22	Azerbaijan Premier League	16	1	3	0	—		19	1
Enosis Neon Paralimni	2022–23	Cypriot First Division	6	0	1	0	—		7	0
Gimnástica Segoviana	2023–24	Segunda Federación	3	0	—		—		3	0
Gimnástica Segoviana	2024–25	Primera Federación	26	1	1	0	—		27	1
Gimnástica Segoviana	Total		29	1	1	0	—		30	1
Rudar Prijedor	2025–26	Bosnian Premier League	21	0	—		—		21	0
Sloga Meridian	2026–27	Bosnian Premier League	8	0	0	0	—		8	0
Career total			208	9	10	0	2	0	220	9
