= 2020–21 Sabah FC season =

Sabah
2020–21 season
- Manager: Vicente Gómez (until 11 March); Ramin Guliyev (Acting Head Coach) (from 11 March)
- Stadium: Alinja Arena
- Premier League: 5th
- Azerbaijan Cup: Last 16 vs Kapaz
- Top goalscorer: League: Ramil Sheydayev (6); All: Ramil Sheydayev (6)

The Sabah FC 2020–21 season was Sabah's third Azerbaijan Premier League season, and their fourth season in existence.

== Season events ==
On 3 July, manager Željko Sopić left the club by mutual consent, with Vicente Gómez being appointed as the clubs new manager on 10 July to a two-year contract.

On 26 June, Sabah signed a new one-year contract with goalkeeper Saša Stamenković.

On 1 August, Ramil Sheydayev signed a new one-year contract with Sabah.

On 2 August, Sabah announced the singing of Nikola Vujadinović on a one-year contract.

On 1 September, Javid Taghiyev left Sabah after his contract was terminated by mutual consent.

On 21 September, Sabah announced the signing of Álvaro Villete on a one-year long loan deal.

On 24 December, Sabah announced the signing of Bakhtiyar Hasanalizade signed for Sabah until the end of the season.

On 29 December, Sabah announced that Moldovan midfielder, Eugeniu Cociuc, had left the club by mutual consent.

On 5 January, Sabah extended their contract with Sakir Seyidov until the summer of 2023.

On 11 January, Sabah announced the signing of Tiemoko Fofana on loan from Ilves for the remainder of the season.

On 13 January, Ozan Kökçü moved to Telstar on loan for the remainder of the season, and Abbas Aghazade left the club by mutual consent.

On 15 January. Sabah confirmed the departure of Ulysse Diallo from the club by mutual consent.

On 15 January, Sabah announced that Nikola Vujadinović had left the club by mutual consent.

On 6 February, Sabah announced the signing of Dmytro Klyots.

On 18 February, Sabah announced the signing of Zurab Ochihava.

On 11 March, Vicente Gómez left his role as Head Coach by mutual agreement, with Ramin Guliyev being placed in temporary charge. At the end of the season, Guliyev was confirmed as the clubs new Head Coach.

== Squad ==
As of match played 19 May 2021

No.	Name	Nationality	Position	Date of birth (age)	Signed from	Signed in	Contract ends	Apps.	Goals
Goalkeepers
1	Saša Stamenković	(Serbia)	GK	5 January 1985 (aged 36)		2018	2021	64	0
12	Álvaro Villete	(Uruguay)	GK	1 July 1991 (aged 29)	Patriotas	2020	2021	8	0
31	Rustam Samigullin	(Azerbaijan)	GK	23 December 2002 (aged 18)	Academy	2020		1	0
94	Nijat Mehbaliyev	(Azerbaijan)	GK	11 September 2000 (aged 20)	Qarabağ	2020	2023	2	0
Defenders
2	Amin Seydiyev	(Azerbaijan)	DF	15 November 1998 (aged 22)	Gabala	2020	2023	25	1
3	Zurab Ochihava	(Ukraine)	DF	18 May 1995 (aged 26)	FCI Levadia	2021	2021	10	0
4	Bahlul Mustafazade	(Azerbaijan)	DF	27 February 1997 (aged 24)	Gabala	2019		37	3
13	Filip Ivanović	(Serbia)	DF	13 February 1992 (aged 29)	Radnik Surdulica	2018		60	2
14	Slavik Alkhasov	(Azerbaijan)	DF	6 February 1993 (aged 28)	Qarabag	2020	2022 (+1)	19	2
15	Ruslan Abışov	(Azerbaijan)	DF	10 October 1987 (aged 33)	Neftçi	2019		13	0
17	Mahammad Mirzabeyov	(Azerbaijan)	DF	16 November 1990 (aged 30)	Neftçi	2019		29	1
19	Tamkin Khalilzade	(Azerbaijan)	DF	6 August 1993 (aged 27)	Gabala	2019	2021	45	3
34	Bakhtiyar Hasanalizade	(Azerbaijan)	DF	29 December 1992 (aged 28)	Zira	2020	2021	8	0
38	Arsen Agjabayov	(Azerbaijan)	DF	11 September 2000 (aged 20)	Academy	2019		4	0
Midfielders
6	Sakir Seyidov	(Azerbaijan)	MF	31 December 2000 (aged 20)	Academy	2018	2023	43	2
7	Joshgun Diniyev	(Azerbaijan)	MF	13 September 1995 (aged 25)	Qarabağ	2019	2021	52	2
8	Elshan Abdullayev	(Azerbaijan)	MF	5 February 1994 (aged 27)	Qarabağ	2018		16	1
10	Aleksey Isayev	(Azerbaijan)	MF	9 November 1995 (aged 25)	Sumgayit	2020	2023	20	1
23	Amadou Diallo	(Guinea)	MF	21 June 1994 (aged 26)	Red Star	2019		36	4
29	Jeyhun Nuriyev	(Azerbaijan)	DF	30 March 2001 (aged 20)	Academy	2020		5	0
30	Mario Marina	(Croatia)	MF	3 August 1989 (aged 31)	HNK Gorica	2020	2021	29	2
48	Dmytro Klyots	(Ukraine)	MF	15 April 1996 (aged 25)	unattached	2021		6	0
66	Abdulax Xaybulayev	(Russia)	MF	19 August 2001 (aged 19)	Academy	2021		1	0
77	Veysal Rzayev	(Azerbaijan)	MF	24 October 2002 (aged 18)	Academy	2020		13	0
Forwards
9	Julio Rodríguez	(Paraguay)	FW	5 December 1990 (aged 30)	Zira	2020	2020	32	3
26	Tiemoko Fofana	(Ivory Coast)	FW	22 October 1999 (aged 21)	loan from Ilves	2021	2021	13	2
28	Kévin Koubemba	(Republic of the Congo)	FW	23 March 1993 (aged 28)	Sabail	2019		23	5
33	Jamal Jafarov	(Azerbaijan)	FW	25 February 2002 (aged 19)	Anzhi Makhachkala	2020	2025	4	0
90	Ramil Sheydayev	(Azerbaijan)	FW	15 March 1996 (aged 25)	Dynamo Moscow	2020	2021	29	6
97	Emil Qasımov	(Azerbaijan)	FW	9 April 2000 (aged 21)		2018		11	1
Out on loan
11	Ozan Kökçü	(Azerbaijan)	MF	18 August 1998 (aged 22)	Giresunspor	2019	2021	29	1
	Elçin Mustafayev	(Azerbaijan)	DF	5 July 2000 (aged 20)	Academy	2018		1	0
	Idris Ingilabli	(Azerbaijan)	MF	6 October 2001 (aged 19)	Gabala	2020	2024	0	0
	Samir Maharramli	(Azerbaijan)	MF	17 July 2002 (aged 18)	Gabala	2020	2023	0	0
	Eltun Turabov	(Azerbaijan)	MF	18 February 1997 (aged 24)	Qarabağ	2018		23	0
Left during the season
3	Ulysse Diallo	(Mali)	FW	26 October 1992 (aged 28)	MTK Budapest	2019	2021	17	4
5	Nikola Vujadinović	(Montenegro)	DF	31 July 1986 (aged 34)	Domžale	2020	2021	8	0
10	Eugeniu Cociuc	(Moldova)	MF	11 May 1993 (aged 28)	Sabail	2020	2021	12	0
60	Abbas Aghazade	(Azerbaijan)	MF	10 February 1999 (aged 22)	Gabala	2019		4	0
71	Dmytro Bezruk	(Ukraine)	GK	30 March 1996 (aged 25)	Chornomorets Odesa	2019		7	0
77	Javid Taghiyev	(Azerbaijan)	MF	22 July 1992 (aged 28)	Sumgayit	2019		5	0

=== On loan ===
Note: Flags indicate national team as defined under FIFA eligibility rules; some limited exceptions apply. Players may hold more than one non-FIFA nationality.

No.	Pos.	Nation	Player
—	DF	AZE	Elçin Mustafayev (at Keşla)
—	MF	AZE	Idris Ingilabli (at Gabala)
—	MF	AZE	Ozan Kökçü (at Telstar)

No.	Pos.	Nation	Player
—	MF	AZE	Samir Maharramli (at Gabala)
—	MF	AZE	Eltun Turabov (at Sumgayit)

== Transfers ==
=== In ===
Date	Position	Nationality	Name	From	Fee	Ref.
25 June 2020	DF	(Azerbaijan)	Slavik Alkhasov	Keşla	Undisclosed	
28 June 2020	GK	(Azerbaijan)	Nijat Mehbaliyev	Qarabağ	Undisclosed	
1 July 2020	DF	(Azerbaijan)	Amin Seydiyev	Gabala	Undisclosed	
1 July 2020	MF	(Azerbaijan)	Idris Ingilabli	Gabala	Undisclosed	
1 July 2020	DF	(Azerbaijan)	Samir Maharramli	Gabala	Undisclosed	
9 July 2020	MF	(Azerbaijan)	Aleksey Isayev	Sumgayit	Free	
17 July 2020	FW	(Azerbaijan)	Jamal Jafarov	Anzhi Makhachkala	Undisclosed	
2 August 2020	DF	(Montenegro)	Nikola Vujadinović	Domžale	Undisclosed	
24 December 2020	DF	(Azerbaijan)	Bakhtiyar Hasanalizade	unattached	Free	
6 February 2021	MF	(Ukraine)	Dmytro Klyots	unattached	Free	
18 February 2021	DF	(Ukraine)	Zurab Ochihava	FCI Levadia	Undisclosed	

=== Loans in ===
Date from	Position	Nationality	Name	To	Date to	Ref.
21 September 2020	GK	(Uruguay)	Álvaro Villete	Patriotas	End of season	
11 January 2021	FW	(Ivory Coast)	Tiemoko Fofana	Ilves	End of season	

=== Out ===
Date	Position	Nationality	Name	To	Fee	Ref.
3 August 2020	MF	(Russia)	Anar Panayev	Legion Dynamo	Undisclosed	

=== Loans out ===
Date from	Position	Nationality	Name	To	Date to	Ref.
20 August 2020	MF	(Azerbaijan)	Eltun Turabov	Sumgayit	End of season	
22 August 2020	MF	(Azerbaijan)	Idris Ingilabli	Gabala	End of season	
22 August 2020	MF	(Azerbaijan)	Samir Maharramli	Gabala	End of season	
15 October 2020	DF	(Azerbaijan)	Arsen Agjabayov	Sabail	Undisclosed	
13 January 2021	MF	(Azerbaijan)	Ozan Kökçü	Telstar	End of season	
22 January 2021	DF	(Azerbaijan)	Elçin Mustafayev	Keşla	End of season	

=== Released ===
Date	Position	Nationality	Name	Joined	Date	Ref.
1 July 2020	MF	(Azerbaijan)	Rashad Eyyubov	Zira	18 July 2020	
21 July 2020	FW	(Azerbaijan)	Elgun Nabiyev	Sabail	19 August 2020	
10 August 2020	GK	(Ukraine)	Dmytro Bezruk			
1 September 2020	MF	(Azerbaijan)	Javid Taghiyev			
29 December 2020	MF	(Moldova)	Eugeniu Cociuc	Keşla	9 February 2021	
13 January 2021	MF	(Azerbaijan)	Abbas Aghazade	Turan-Tovuz		
15 January 2021	FW	(Mali)	Ulysse Diallo	Mezőkövesdi		
30 January 2021	DF	(Montenegro)	Nikola Vujadinović	Radnički Niš		
21 May 2021	DF	(Azerbaijan)	Mahammad Mirzabeyov	Sabail	2 July 2021	
21 May 2021	MF	(Guinea)	Amadou Diallo	Teplice	7 September 2021	
22 May 2021	FW	(Republic of the Congo)	Kévin Koubemba	Teuta Durrës		
25 May 2021	DF	(Azerbaijan)	Tamkin Khalilzade	Zira	1 June 2021	
31 May 2021	DF	(Azerbaijan)	Elçin Mustafayev	Keşla	1 June 2021	
31 May 2021	MF	(Azerbaijan)	Javid Taghiyev	Sabail	15 July 2021	
31 May 2021	MF	(Croatia)	Mario Marina	Slaven Belupo		
31 May 2021	MF	(Ukraine)	Dmytro Klyots	Veres Rivne	15 June 2021	

== Friendlies ==
14 January 2021	Sabah	1 – 0	Sabail	Masazır
AZT (UTC+4)	Diniyev 53'	Report		Stadium: Bank Respublika Arena

== Competitions ==
=== Premier League ===
==== Results summary ====
Overall								Home						Away					
Pld	W	D	L	GF	GA	GD	Pts	W	D	L	GF	GA	GD	W	D	L	GF	GA	GD
28	7	8	13	28	38	−10	29	4	4	6	14	19	−5	3	4	7	14	19	−5

Last updated: 19 May 2021.
Source: See Results

==== Results by round ====
Round	1	2	3	4	5	6	7	8	9	10	11	12	13	14	15	16	17	18	19	20	21	22	23	24	25	26	27	28
Ground	A	H	A	A	H	A	H	A	H	H	A	H	A	A	A	A	H	A	H	A	H	H	A	H	A	H	A	H
Result	L	W	W	L	L	L	L	L	L	W	D	L	W	L	D	L	D	L	D	L	W	D	D	D	W	L	D	W
Position	8	4	1	4	6	6	6	8	8	7	8	8	6	8	6	8	8	8	8	8	7	7	7	7	5	5	5	5

Updated to match(es) played on 19 May 2021. Source: See Results
A = Away; H = Home; W = Win; D = Draw; L = Loss

==== Results ====
22 August 2020 1	Qarabağ	2 – 0	Sabah	Baku
20:00 AZT (UTC+4)	Emreli 45', 69'; Ibrahimli (yellow card) 67'	Report	Marina (yellow card) 75'; Rodríguez (yellow card) 77'; Khalilzade (yellow card) 86'	Stadium: Azersun Arena; Attendance: 0 Referee: Rahim Hasanov
Note: Match played behind closed doors due to the COVID-19 pandemic.

13 September 2020 2	Sabah	3 – 0	Gabala	Masazır
19:00 AZT (UTC+4)	Diniyev 17'; Mustafazade 28'; Marina (yellow card) 38'; Alkhasov (yellow card) 49' (yellow-red card) 77'; Sheydayev 64'	Report	Mammadov (yellow card) 4'; Muradov (yellow card) 45+2'; Aliyev (yellow card) 62'; Međimorec (yellow card) 70'; Goxha (yellow card) 85'	Stadium: Bank Respublika Arena; Attendance: 0 Referee: Aliyar Agayev
Note: Match played behind closed doors due to the COVID-19 pandemic.

20 September 2020 3	Zira	0 – 2	Sabah	Zirə
18:00 AZT (UTC+4)	Jamalov (yellow card) 24'; Clésio (yellow card) 85'; Muradov (yellow card) 90+4'	Report	Rodríguez (yellow card) 22' (goal) 51'; Mirzabeyov (yellow card) 60'; Nuriyev (yellow card) 85'; Khalilzade (yellow card) 89'; Koubemba 90+2'	Stadium: Zira Olympic Sport Complex Stadium; Attendance: 0 Referee: Ingilab Mammadov
Note: Match played behind closed doors due to the COVID-19 pandemic.

26 September 2020 4	Sabail	2 – 1	Sabah	Baku
18:00 AZT (UTC+4)	Manafov (yellow card) 26'; Kadriu (yellow card) 33'; Ismayilov 56' (pen.) (yellow card) 56'; Aliyev 71'; Ekstein (yellow card) 80'	Report	Marina (yellow card) 15'; Sheydayev 27' (pen.); Kökçü (yellow card) 32'; Khalilzade (yellow card) 87'; Diniyev (yellow card) 90+4'	Stadium: Bayil Arena; Attendance: 0 Referee: Elcin Masiyev
Note: Match played behind closed doors due to the COVID-19 pandemic.

2 October 2020 5	Sabah	0 – 2	Keşla	Masazır
15:30 AZT (UTC+4)	Mirzabeyov (yellow card) 74'; A.Diallo (yellow card) 90+3'	Report	Hajiyev (yellow card) 39'; Kamara (yellow card) 47'; Sílvio 54'; Aliyev (yellow card) 88'; Isgandarli 90'; Amirjanov (yellow card) 90+3'	Stadium: Bank Respublika Arena; Attendance: 0 Referee: Vugar Hasanli
Note: Match played behind closed doors due to the COVID-19 pandemic.

18 October 2020 6	Neftçi	1 – 0	Sabah	Baku
14:00 AZT (UTC+4)	M.Kane (yellow card) 3' (yellow-red card) 75'; Alaskarov 29'; Telushi (yellow card) 71'; Mammadov (yellow card) 90+2'	Report	Alkhasov (yellow card) 16'; Kökçü (yellow card) 69'; Rodríguez (yellow card) 90+1'	Stadium: Eighth Kilometer District Stadium; Attendance: 0 Referee: Aliyar Agayev
Note: Match played behind closed doors due to the COVID-19 pandemic.

25 October 2020 7	Sabah	1 – 2	Sumgayit	Masazır
14:00 AZT (UTC+4)	Marina (yellow card) 43'; Ivanović (yellow card) 52'; Sheydayev (yellow card) 60'; Rzayev (yellow card) 62'; Imamverdiyev 65' (o.g.); Vujadinović (yellow card) 76'	Report	Badalov (yellow card) 19'; Ghorbani 28'; Najafov (yellow card) 60'; Hüseynov (yellow card) 63'; Mutallimov (yellow card) 85'; Abdullazade 90+5'	Stadium: Bank Respublika Arena; Attendance: 0 Referee: Elcin Masiyev
Note: Match played behind closed doors due to the COVID-19 pandemic.

31 October 2020 8	Gabala	2 – 1	Sabah	Qabala
14:00 AZT (UTC+4)	Mammadov (yellow card) 19'; Nabiyev 31'; Rajsel 53'; Ahmadli (yellow card) 89'	Report	Vujadinović (yellow card) 35' (yellow-red card) 68'; Ivanović (yellow card) 36'; Seydiyev (yellow card) 42'; Sheydayev 81' (yellow card) 82'	Stadium: Gabala City Stadium; Attendance: 0 Referee: Vugar Hasanli
Note: Match played behind closed doors due to the COVID-19 pandemic.

8 November 2020 9	Sabah	0 – 1	Zira	Masazır
17:00 AZT (UTC+4)	Marina (yellow card) 15'; Kökçü (yellow card) 45'; Diniyev (yellow card) 45+3'; Seydiyev (yellow card) 56'	Report	Matheus Albino (yellow card) 41' (yellow-red card) 90'; Ramazanov 58'; Richard (yellow card) 73'; Muradov (yellow card) 73'	Stadium: Bank Respublika Arena; Attendance: 0 Referee: Rauf Jabbarov
Note: Match played behind closed doors due to the COVID-19 pandemic.

23 November 2020 10	Sabah	2 – 1	Sabail	Masazır
16:00 AZT (UTC+4)	A.Diallo 11'; Seydiyev 33'; Marina (yellow card) 67'; Stamenković (yellow card) 90+4'	Report	Aliyev (yellow card) 59' (goal) 90+5' (pen.); Naghiyev (yellow card) 90+5'	Stadium: Bank Respublika Arena; Attendance: 0 Referee: Raad Ahmadov
Note: Match played behind closed doors due to the COVID-19 pandemic.

29 November 2020 11	Keşla	1 – 1	Sabah	Baku
14:00 AZT (UTC+4)	Kamara (yellow card) 10' (yellow-red card) 54'; Meza (yellow card) 11' (goal) 85'; Qirtimov (yellow card) 29' (yellow-red card) 86'; Guliyev (yellow card) 36'; Bojović (yellow card) 67'	Report	Seydiyev (yellow card) 58'; Koubemba 60' (yellow card) 90+2'	Stadium: ASK Arena; Attendance: 0 Referee: Ingilab Mammadov
Note: Match played behind closed doors due to the COVID-19 pandemic.

20 December 2020 12	Sabah	0 – 2	Neftçi	Masazır
17:15 AZT (UTC+4)	Diniyev (yellow card) 45+3'; Isayev (yellow card) 69'; Rodríguez (yellow card) 86'	Report	Buludov (yellow card) 45+1'; Alaskarov 45+3' (pen.), 65'	Stadium: Bank Respublika Arena; Attendance: 0 Referee: Aliyar Agayev
Note: Match originally scheduled for 5 December, but postponed. Match played behind closed doors due to the COVID-19 pandemic.

24 December 2020 13	Sumgayit	1 – 2	Sabah	Sumqayit
16:00 AZT (UTC+4)	Najafov 31' (yellow card) 59'; Mustafayev (yellow card) 39'; Bayramov (yellow card) 64'	Report	Alkhasov 26'; Isayev 65' (pen.); Ivanović (yellow card) 69'; A.Diallo (yellow card) 75'	Stadium: Kapital Bank Arena; Attendance: 0 Referee: Ingilab Mammadov
Note: Match played behind closed doors due to the COVID-19 pandemic.

21 January 2021 14	Sabah	1 – 2	Qarabağ	Masazır
18:00 AZT (UTC+4)	Isayev (yellow card) 43'; Marina (yellow card) 55'; Koubemba 60'	Report	Mammadov 8'; Emreli 72'	Stadium: Bank Respublika Arena; Attendance: 0 Referee: Vugar Hasanli
Note: Match played behind closed doors due to the COVID-19 pandemic.

14 February 2021 15	Zira	2 – 2	Sabah	Zirə
17:00 AZT (UTC+4)	Chantakias (yellow card) 56'; Volkovi 79'; Clésio 90+2'	Report	Koubemba 9', 83'; Ivanović (yellow card) 47'; Alkhasov (yellow card) 49'; Fofana (yellow card) 63'; S.Seyidov (yellow card) 79'	Stadium: Zira Olympic Sport Complex Stadium; Attendance: 0 Referee: Kamal Umudlu
Note: Match played behind closed doors due to the COVID-19 pandemic.

19 February 2021 16	Sabail	2 – 0	Sabah	Baku
16:00 AZT (UTC+4)	Yunanov 17', 78' (yellow card) 57'; Imnadze (yellow card) 27'; Petrovikj (yellow card) 46'	Report	Fofana (yellow card) 37'; Koubemba (yellow card) 38'; S.Seyidov (yellow card) 66'	Stadium: Bayil Arena; Attendance: 0 Referee: Rahim Hasanov
Note: Match played behind closed doors due to the COVID-19 pandemic.

25 February 2021 17	Sabah	1 – 1	Keşla	Masazır
17:30 AZT (UTC+4)	S.Seyidov (yellow card) 5'; Ochihava (yellow card) 19'; Marina (yellow card) 48'; Koubemba (yellow card) 64'; Fofana 90+1'	Report	T.Guliyev (yellow card) 36'; Cociuc (yellow card) 38'; Sílvio (yellow card) 55'; Aliyev 79'; Malikov (yellow card) 79'	Stadium: Bank Respublika Arena; Attendance: 0 Referee: Vugar Hasanli
Note: Match played behind closed doors due to the COVID-19 pandemic.

3 March 2021 18	Neftçi	2 – 1	Sabah	Baku
18:15 AZT (UTC+4)	Alaskarov 44'; Lawal (yellow card) 49'; Ahmedov (yellow card) 59'; Abbasov 64'	Report	Ivanović (yellow card) 86'; Khalilzade 90+3' (pen.)	Stadium: Eighth Kilometer District Stadium; Attendance: 0 Referee: Raad Ahmadov
Note: Match played behind closed doors due to the COVID-19 pandemic.

8 March 2021 19	Sabah	1 – 1	Sumgayit	Masazır
16:00 AZT (UTC+4)	Khalilzade 34'; Hasanalizade (yellow card) 90+2'	Report	Badalov (yellow card) 45+1'; Mustafayev (yellow card) 57'; Khodzhaniyazov 69'	Stadium: Bank Respublika Arena; Attendance: 0 Referee: Aliyar Agayev
Note: Match played behind closed doors due to the COVID-19 pandemic.

13 March 2021 20	Qarabağ	2 – 0	Sabah	Baku
17:00 AZT (UTC+4)	Ozobić 42'; Emreli 73'	Report	Ochihava (yellow card) 17'	Stadium: Azersun Arena; Attendance: 0 Referee: Orkhan Mammadov
Note: Match played behind closed doors due to the COVID-19 pandemic.

4 April 2021 21	Sabah	1 – 0	Gabala	Masazır
17:30 AZT (UTC+4)	Marina (yellow card) 30'; Isayev (yellow card) 35'; Sheydayev 45+1'; Ivanović (yellow card) 67'; Mustafazade (yellow card) 84'	Report	Ahmadov (yellow card) 27'; Musayev (yellow card) 90+1'; Shahverdiyev (yellow card) 90+1'; Nazirov (yellow card) 90+2'; Mammadov (yellow card) 90+4'	Stadium: Bank Respublika Arena; Attendance: 0 Referee: Rahim Hasanov
Note: Match played behind closed doors due to the COVID-19 pandemic.

10 April 2021 22	Sabah	0 – 0	Sabail	Masazır
18:00 AZT (UTC+4)	Marina (yellow card) 20'; Ivanović (yellow card) 43'; Isayev (yellow card) 58'; Sheydayev (yellow card) 88'	Report	Isayev (yellow card) 34' (yellow-red card) 90+2'; Manafov (yellow card) 83'; Naghiyev (yellow card) 88'	Stadium: Bank Respublika Arena; Attendance: 0 Referee: Kamal Umudlu
Note: Match played behind closed doors due to the COVID-19 pandemic.

17 April 2021 23	Keşla	0 – 0	Sabah	Baku
18:00 AZT (UTC+4)	Amirjanov (yellow card) 79'; Valizade (yellow card) 80'; Sílvio (yellow card) 82'; Aliyev (yellow card) 90+1'	Report	Mustafazade (yellow card) 34'; Marina (yellow card) 37'; Ochihava (yellow card) 46'	Stadium: ASK Arena; Attendance: 0 Referee: Elcin Masiyev
Note: Match played behind closed doors due to the COVID-19 pandemic.

25 April 2021 24	Sabah	2 – 2	Neftçi	Masazır
19:15 AZT (UTC+4)	Khalilzade 24' (pen.) (yellow card) 89' (yellow-red card) 89'; Ivanović (yellow card) 28' (yellow-red card) 86'; Sheydayev 30' (yellow card) 84'; Mustafazade (yellow card) 34' (yellow-red card) 58'; Stamenković (yellow card) 82'	Report	Stanković (yellow card) 4'; Mammadov (yellow card) 23'; Honda (yellow card) 23'; Kane (yellow card) 32'; Alaskarov 36' (pen.), 60' (pen.); Mahmudov (yellow card) 48'; Abbasov (yellow card) 72'; Bougrine (yellow card) 90+7'	Stadium: Bank Respublika Arena; Attendance: 0 Referee: Vugar Hasanli
Note: Match played behind closed doors due to the COVID-19 pandemic.

4 May 2021 25	Sumgayit	0 – 2	Sabah	Sumqayit
20:15 AZT (UTC+4)	Haghverdi (yellow card) 34'; Khodzhaniyazov (yellow card) 37' (red card) 85'; Najafov (yellow card) 45'; Mustafayev (yellow card) 56'; Sharifi (yellow card) 60'	Report	Marina 40' (yellow card) 87'; Ochihava (yellow card) 61'; Fofana 69'	Stadium: Kapital Bank Arena; Attendance: 0 Referee: Kamal Umudlu
Note: Match played behind closed doors due to the COVID-19 pandemic.

9 May 2021 26	Sabah	0 – 4	Qarabağ	Masazır
20:15 AZT (UTC+4)	Ivanović (yellow card) 90'	Report	Zoubir 27'; Emreli 32'; Romero 40'; Medvedev 45+2' (pen.); Medina (yellow card) 60'	Stadium: Bank Respublika Arena; Attendance: 0 Referee: Rauf Jabbarov
Note: Match played behind closed doors due to the COVID-19 pandemic.

14 May 2021 27	Gabala	2 – 2	Sabah	Qabala
17:00 AZT (UTC+4)	Goxha (yellow card) 41'; Rajsel 63' (pen.); Vukčević 65'	Report	Rodríguez 29'; Marina (yellow card) 44'; Alkhasov 59'; Sheydayev (yellow card) 90+4'; Diniyev (yellow card) 90+4'	Stadium: Gabala City Stadium; Attendance: 0 Referee: Elcin Masiyev
Note: Match played behind closed doors due to the COVID-19 pandemic.

19 May 2021 28	Sabah	2 – 1	Zira	Masazır
18:00 AZT (UTC+4)	Sheydayev 21'; Marina (yellow card) 71'; Ivanović (yellow card) 78'; Alkhasov (yellow card) 87'; Rodríguez 89'; Ochihava (yellow card) 90+5'	Report	Hajili (yellow card) 41'; Ramazanov (yellow card) 77'; Aliyev 78' (pen.)	Stadium: Bank Respublika Arena; Attendance: 0 Referee: Aliyar Agayev
Note: Match played behind closed doors due to the COVID-19 pandemic.

==== League table ====
Pos	Team	Pld	W	D	L	GF	GA	GD	Pts	Qualification
3	Sumgayit	28	10	9	9	30	31	−1	39	Qualification to Europa Conference League second qualifying round
4	Zira	28	8	14	6	28	28	0	38	
5	Sabah	28	7	8	13	28	38	−10	29	
6	Keşla	28	5	11	12	25	40	−15	26	Qualification to Europa Conference League second qualifying round
7	Gabala	28	5	11	12	23	44	−21	26	

Source: Soccerway
Rules for classification: 1) Points; 2) Head-to-head points; 3) Head-to-head goal difference; 4) Head-to-head goals scored; 5) Head-to-head away goals scored (only if two teams); 6) Goal difference; 7) Goals scored.

=== Azerbaijan Cup ===
25 January 2021 Last 16	Sabah	1 – 2	Kapaz	Masazır
17:00 AZT (UTC+4)	Ivanović 45+1'	Report	U.Samadov (yellow card) 3'; Nod.Mammadov (yellow card) 42'; S.Qurbanov 68'; A.Samadov 84'	Stadium: Bank Respublika Arena; Attendance: 0 Referee: Farid Haciyev
Note: Match played behind closed doors due to the COVID-19 pandemic in Azerbaijan.

== Squad statistics ==
As of match played 19 May 2021

=== Appearances and goals ===
No.	Pos	Nat	Player	Total		Premier League		Azerbaijan Cup	
No.	Pos	Nat	Player	Apps	Goals	Apps	Goals	Apps	Goals
1	GK	(Serbia) SRB	Saša Stamenković	18	0	18	0	0	0
2	DF	(Azerbaijan) AZE	Amin Seydiyev	25	1	21+3	1	1	0
3	DF	(Ukraine) UKR	Zurab Ochihava	10	0	10	0	0	0
4	DF	(Azerbaijan) AZE	Bahlul Mustafazade	17	1	17	1	0	0
6	MF	(Azerbaijan) AZE	Sakir Seyidov	14	0	11+3	0	0	0
7	MF	(Azerbaijan) AZE	Joshgun Diniyev	23	1	16+6	1	1	0
8	MF	(Azerbaijan) AZE	Elshan Abdullayev	2	0	0+1	0	0+1	0
9	FW	(Paraguay) PAR	Julio Rodríguez	26	3	17+8	3	1	0
10	MF	(Azerbaijan) AZE	Aleksey Isayev	20	1	16+4	1	0	0
12	GK	(Uruguay) URU	Álvaro Villete	8	0	8	0	0	0
13	DF	(Serbia) SRB	Filip Ivanović	18	1	16+1	0	1	1
14	DF	(Azerbaijan) AZE	Slavik Alkhasov	19	2	17+2	2	0	0
15	DF	(Azerbaijan) AZE	Ruslan Abışov	5	0	4+1	0	0	0
17	DF	(Azerbaijan) AZE	Mahammad Mirzabeyov	10	0	3+6	0	1	0
19	DF	(Azerbaijan) AZE	Tamkin Khalilzade	17	3	12+4	3	1	0
23	MF	(Guinea) GUI	Amadou Diallo	15	1	7+7	1	0+1	0
26	FW	(Ivory Coast) CIV	Tiemoko Fofana	13	2	11+1	2	1	0
28	FW	(Republic of the Congo) CGO	Kévin Koubemba	23	5	14+8	5	0+1	0
29	MF	(Azerbaijan) AZE	Jeyhun Nuriyev	5	0	3+2	0	0	0
30	MF	(Croatia) CRO	Mario Marina	23	1	23	1	0	0
31	GK	(Azerbaijan) AZE	Rustam Samigullin	1	0	0	0	1	0
33	FW	(Azerbaijan) AZE	Jamal Jafarov	4	0	1+3	0	0	0
34	DF	(Azerbaijan) AZE	Bakhtiyar Hasanalizade	8	0	8	0	0	0
38	DF	(Azerbaijan) AZE	Arsen Agjabayov	2	0	0+1	0	1	0
48	MF	(Ukraine) UKR	Dmytro Klyots	6	0	4+2	0	0	0
66	MF	(Russia) RUS	Abdulax Xaybulayev	1	0	0+1	0	0	0
77	MF	(Azerbaijan) AZE	Veysal Rzayev	13	0	9+3	0	1	0
90	FW	(Azerbaijan) AZE	Ramil Sheydayev	26	6	15+10	6	1	0
94	GK	(Azerbaijan) AZE	Nijat Mehbaliyev	2	0	2	0	0	0
Players away from Sabah on loan:
11	MF	(Azerbaijan) AZE	Ozan Kökçü	12	0	11+1	0	0	0
Players who left Sabah during the season:
3	FW	(Mali) MLI	Ulysse Diallo	1	0	1	0	0	0
5	DF	(Montenegro) MNE	Nikola Vujadinović	8	0	8	0	0	0
10	MF	(Moldova) MDA	Eugeniu Cociuc	8	0	5+3	0	0	0

=== Goal scorers ===
Place	Position	Nation	Number	Name	Premier League	Azerbaijan Cup	Total
1	FW	(Azerbaijan)	90	Ramil Sheydayev	6	0	6
2	FW	(Republic of the Congo)	28	Kévin Koubemba	5	0	5
3	DF	(Azerbaijan)	19	Tamkin Khalilzade	3	0	3
3	FW	(Paraguay)	18	Julio Rodríguez	3	0	3
5	FW	(Ivory Coast)	26	Tiemoko Fofana	2	0	2
5	DF	(Azerbaijan)	14	Slavik Alkhasov	2	0	2
7	FW	(Azerbaijan)	7	Joshgun Diniyev	1	0	1
7	DF	(Azerbaijan)	4	Bahlul Mustafazade	1	0	1
7	MF	(Guinea)	23	Amadou Diallo	1	0	1
7	DF	(Azerbaijan)	2	Amin Seydiyev	1	0	1
7	MF	(Azerbaijan)	46	Aleksey Isayev	1	0	1
7	MF	(Croatia)	30	Mario Marina	1	0	1
7	DF	(Serbia)	13	Filip Ivanović	0	1	1
7				Own goal	1	0	1
				TOTALS	28	1	29

=== Clean sheets ===
Place	Position	Nation	Number	Name	Premier League	Azerbaijan Cup	Total
1	GK	(Serbia)	1	Saša Stamenković	5	0	5
2	GK	(Azerbaijan)	94	Nijat Mehbaliyev	1	0	1
				TOTALS	6	0	6

=== Disciplinary record ===
Number	Nation	Position	Name	Premier League		Azerbaijan Cup		Total	
Number	Nation	Position	Name	Booked	Sent off (straight red)	Booked	Sent off (straight red)	Booked	Sent off (straight red)
1	(Serbia)	GK	Saša Stamenković	2	0	0	0	2	0
2	(Azerbaijan)	DF	Amin Seydiyev	3	0	0	0	3	0
3	(Ukraine)	DF	Zurab Ochihava	5	0	0	0	5	0
4	(Azerbaijan)	DF	Bahlul Mustafazade	4	1	0	0	4	1
6	(Azerbaijan)	MF	Sakir Seyidov	3	0	0	0	3	0
7	(Azerbaijan)	MF	Joshgun Diniyev	5	0	0	0	5	0
9	(Paraguay)	FW	Julio Rodríguez	4	0	0	0	4	0
10	(Azerbaijan)	MF	Aleksey Isayev	4	0	0	0	4	0
13	(Serbia)	DF	Filip Ivanović	11	1	0	0	11	1
14	(Azerbaijan)	DF	Slavik Alkhasov	5	1	0	0	5	1
17	(Azerbaijan)	DF	Mahammad Mirzabeyov	2	0	0	0	2	0
19	(Azerbaijan)	DF	Tamkin Khalilzade	5	1	0	0	5	1
23	(Guinea)	MF	Amadou Diallo	2	0	0	0	2	0
26	(Ivory Coast)	FW	Tiemoko Fofana	2	0	0	0	2	0
28	(Republic of the Congo)	FW	Kévin Koubemba	3	0	0	0	3	0
29	(Azerbaijan)	MF	Jeyhun Nuriyev	1	0	0	0	1	0
30	(Croatia)	MF	Mario Marina	14	0	0	0	14	0
34	(Azerbaijan)	DF	Bakhtiyar Hasanalizade	1	0	0	0	1	0
77	(Azerbaijan)	MF	Veysal Rzayev	1	0	0	0	1	0
90	(Azerbaijan)	FW	Ramil Sheydayev	5	0	0	0	5	0
Players away on loan:
11	(Azerbaijan)	MF	Ozan Kökçü	3	0	0	0	3	0
Players who left Sabah during the season:
5	(Montenegro)	DF	Nikola Vujadinović	3	1	0	0	3	1
			TOTALS	88	5	0	0	88	5
