= 2020–21 Azerbaijan Premier League =

Azerbaijan Premier League
- Season: 2020–21
- Dates: 21 August 2020 – 19 May 2021
- Champions: Neftçi Baku
- Relegated: None
- Champions League: Neftçi Baku
- Europa League: Qarabağ; Sumgayit; Keşla
- Matches: 112
- Goals: 266 (2.38 per match)
- Top goalscorer: Namik Alaskarov (19 goals)
- Biggest home win: Qarabağ 6–1 Keşla (1 November 2020); Qarabağ 6–1 Sumgayit (21 November 2020)
- Biggest away win: Neftçi Baku 0–6 Qarabağ (8 November 2020)
- Highest scoring: Qarabağ 6–1 Keşla (1 November 2020); Qarabağ 6–1 Sumgayit (21 November 2020)
- Longest winning run: 5 matches Neftçi Baku
- Longest unbeaten run: 11 matches Qarabağ
- Longest winless run: 14 matches Keşla
- Longest losing run: 6 matches Sabah
- All statistics correct as of 4 May 2021.

The 2020–21 Azerbaijan Premier League was the 29th season of the Azerbaijan Premier League, the highest tier football league of Azerbaijan. The season began on 21 August 2020 and ended on 19 May 2021.

Neftçi Baku were the champions, winning the league for the 9th time in their history and ending Qarabağ FK’s 7-year winning streak. They qualified for the first qualifying round of the 2021–22 Champions League. Qarabağ and Sumgayit earned places in the second qualifying round of the UEFA Europa Conference League.

== Teams ==
Locations of the 2020–21 Azerbaijan Premier League teams.
Team in italics is from a zone of the Nagorno-Karabakh conflict and is playing its home games in Baku.

=== Stadia and locations ===
Note: Table lists in alphabetical order.

Team	Year Established	Location	Venue	Capacity
Gabala	1995	Qabala	Gabala City Stadium	4,500
Keşla	1997	Keshla	ASK Arena	5,800
Neftchi Baku	1906/1937	Baku	Bakcell Arena	10,200
Qarabağ	1951/1987	Aghdam	Azersun Arena	5,200
Sabah	2017	Absheron	Bank Respublika Arena	13,000
Sabail	2016	Səbail	Bayil Arena	3,200
Sumgayit	2010	Sumqayit	Kapital Bank Arena	1,400
Zira	2014	Zira	Zira Olympic Sport Complex Stadium	1,300

=== Stadiums ===
Gabala	Keşla	Qarabağ	Neftçi Baku
Gabala City Stadium	ASK Arena	Azersun Arena	Bakcell Arena
Capacity: **4,500**	Capacity: **5,800**	Capacity: **5,200**	Capacity: **10,200**
Sabah	Sabail	Sumgayit	Zira
Bank Respublika Arena	ASCO Arena	Kapital Bank Arena	Zira Olympic Sport Complex Stadium
Capacity: **13,000**	Capacity: **3,200**	Capacity: **1,400**	Capacity: **1,300**

=== Personnel and kits ===
Note: Flags indicate national team as has been defined under FIFA eligibility rules. Players and managers may hold more than one non-FIFA nationality.

Team	President	Manager	Captain	Kit manufacturer	Shirt sponsor
Gabala	(Azerbaijan) Fariz Najafov	(Azerbaijan) Elmar Bakhshiyev	(Azerbaijan) Asif Mammadov	(Spain) Joma	Milla
Keşla	(Azerbaijan) Zaur Akhundov	(Azerbaijan) Yunis Huseynov	(Azerbaijan) Ilkin Qirtimov	(Spain) Joma	Samaya LTD
Neftçi Baku	(Azerbaijan) Kamran Guliyev	(Azerbaijan) Samir Abbasov	(Azerbaijan) Emin Mahmudov	(United States) Nike	Turkish Airlines
Qarabağ	(Turkey) Abdolbari Gozal	(Azerbaijan) Gurban Gurbanov	(Azerbaijan) Maksim Medvedev	(Germany) Adidas	Azersun
Sabah	(Azerbaijan) Magsud Adigozalov	(Azerbaijan) Ramin Guliyev (Acting Head Coach)	(Azerbaijan) Ruslan Abışov	(United States) Nike	Bank Respublika
Sabail	(Azerbaijan) Rashad Abdullayev	(Azerbaijan) Aftandil Hacıyev	(Azerbaijan) Rahid Amirguliyev	(United States) Nike	AzTea
Sumgayit	(Azerbaijan) Riad Rafiyev	(Azerbaijan) Aykhan Abbasov	(Azerbaijan) Vurğun Hüseynov	(Germany) Jako	Pasha Insurance, Azərikimya
Zira	(Azerbaijan) Taleh Nasibov	(Azerbaijan) Rashad Sadygov	(Azerbaijan) Aghabala Ramazanov	(Spain) Joma	Bakcell, Azfargroup

=== Managerial changes ===
Team	Outgoing manager	Manner of departure	Date of vacancy	Position in table	Incoming manager	Date of appointment
Sabah	(Croatia) Željko Sopić	Resigned	3 July 2020	Pre-season	(Spain) Vicente Gómez	10 July 2020.
Zira	(Azerbaijan) Zaur Hashimov	End of contract	17 July 2020	Pre-season	(Azerbaijan) Rashad Sadygov	17 July 2020
Keşla	(Azerbaijan) Tarlan Ahmedov	End of contract	8 August 2020	Pre-season	(Azerbaijan) Yunis Huseynov	16 August 2020
Neftchi	(Azerbaijan) Fizuli Mammedov	Resigned	11 November 2020	4th	(Azerbaijan) Samir Abbasov	11 November 2020
Keşla	(Azerbaijan) Yunis Huseynov	Resigned	24 January 2021	7th	(Azerbaijan) Sanan Gurbanov	25 January 2021
Sabah	(Spain) Vicente Gómez	Mutual termination	11 March 2021	Pre-season	(Azerbaijan) Ramin Guliyev (Acting Head Coach)	11 March 2021

=== Foreign players ===
A team could use only six foreign players on the field in each game.

Club	Player 1	Player 2	Player 3	Player 4	Player 5	Player 6	Player 7	Player 8	Player 9	Player 10	Player 11	Former Players
Gabala	(Albania) Jurgen Goxha	(Brazil) Raphael Alemão	(Croatia) Vinko Međimorec	(Georgia (country)) Merab Gigauri	(Montenegro) Stefan Vukčević	(Nigeria) James Adeniyi	(Slovenia) Nicolas Rajsel	(Togo) Yaovi Akakpo				(Chile) Rodrigo Gattas
Keşla	(Brazil) Sílvio	(Cameroon) **Anatole Abang**	(Mali) **Sadio Tounkara**	(Moldova) **Eugeniu Cociuc**	(Moldova) Stanislav Namașco	(Montenegro) Mijuško Bojović	(Paraguay) César Meza Colli	(Sierra Leone) John Kamara				(Angola) Alexander Christovão (Brazil) Álvaro Vieira (Brazil) Artur (Ukraine) Dmytro Klyots (Uzbekistan) Shohrux Gadoyev
Neftçi	(Albania) Bruno Telushi	(Brazil) Rener Pavão	(Brazil) Thallyson	(Bulgaria) **Ahmed Ahmedov**	(France) Steeven Joseph-Monrose	(Guinea) Mamadou Kane	(Japan) **Keisuke Honda**	(Morocco) Sabir Bougrine	(Nigeria) Yusuf Lawal	(Senegal) Mamadou Mbodj	(Serbia) Vojislav Stanković	(Iran) Saman Nariman Jahan (Republic of the Congo) Prince Ibara
Qarabağ	(Colombia) Kevin Medina	(Cape Verde) Patrick Andrade	(Serbia) Uroš Matić	(Croatia) Filip Ozobić	(Spain) Jaime Romero	(France) Abdellah Zoubir	(Ghana) Owusu Kwabena					(Haiti) Wilde-Donald Guerrier
Sabah	(Croatia) Mario Marina	(Guinea) Amadou Diallo	(Ivory Coast) **Tiemoko Fofana**	(Paraguay) Julio Rodríguez	(Republic of the Congo) Kévin Koubemba	(Serbia) Filip Ivanović	(Serbia) Saša Stamenković	(Ukraine) **Dmytro Klyots**	(Ukraine) **Zurab Ochihava**	(Uruguay) Álvaro Villete		(Mali) Ulysse Diallo (Moldova) Eugeniu Cociuc (Montenegro) Nikola Vujadinović
Sabail	(Georgia (country)) **Luka Imnadze**	(Guatemala) Nicholas Hagen	(North Macedonia) Florijan Kadriu	(South Africa) Hendrick Ekstein	(North Macedonia) **Milovan Petrovikj**	(Sierra Leone) **Alie Sesay**						(Democratic Republic of the Congo) Lema Mabidi (Iran) Bakhtiar Rahmani (Iran) Peyman Keshavarzi
Sumgayit	(Canada) Martin Balco	(Iran) **Hojjat Haghverdi**	(Iran) **Mehdi Sharifi**	(Russia) Dzhamaldin Khodzhaniyazov								(Canada) Adam Hemati
Zira	(Argentina) **Facundo Melivilo**	(Brazil) **Filipe Pachtmann**	(Brazil) Matheus Albino	(Cameroon) **Rodrigue Bongongui**	(Georgia (country)) Davit Volkovi	(Greece) Dimitrios Chantakias	(Mozambique) Clésio	(Serbia) Lazar Đorđević	(Serbia) **Nemanja Anđelković**			(Brazil) Caio Rangel (Sierra Leone) Alie Sesay

In bold: Players that join the club mid-season

In Italic: Players that left the club mid-season

== League table ==
Pos	Team	Pld	W	D	L	GF	GA	GD	Pts	Qualification
1	Neftçi Baku (C)	28	18	5	5	47	25	+22	59	Qualification for the Champions League first qualifying round
2	Qarabağ	28	16	9	3	64	18	+46	57	Qualification to Europa Conference League second qualifying round
3	Sumgayit	28	10	9	9	30	31	−1	39	Qualification to Europa Conference League second qualifying round
4	Zira	28	8	14	6	28	28	0	38	
5	Sabah	28	7	8	13	28	38	−10	29	
6	Keşla	28	5	11	12	25	40	−15	26	Qualification to Europa Conference League second qualifying round
7	Gabala	28	5	11	12	23	44	−21	26	
8	Sabail	28	5	9	14	21	42	−21	24	

Source: Soccerway
Rules for classification: 1) Points; 2) Head-to-head points; 3) Head-to-head goal difference; 4) Head-to-head goals scored; 5) Head-to-head away goals scored (only if two teams); 6) Goal difference; 7) Goals scored.
(C) Champions

== Fixtures and results ==
Clubs played each other four times for a total of 28 matches each.

=== Matches 1–14 ===
Home \ Away	GAB	KES	NEF	QAR	SAB	SEB	SUM	ZIR
Gabala		0–0	1–4	1–1	2–1	1–1	1–1	1–1
Keşla	3–1		0–1	0–0	1–1	0–2	0–1	2–3
Neftçi Baku	1–1	2–1		0–6	1–0	2–1	0–2	0–0
Qarabağ	3–0	6–1	1–2		2–0	4–0	6–1	3–2
Sabah	3–0	0–2	0–2	1–2		2–1	1–2	0–1
Sabail	1–3	1–1	1–3	1–1	2–1		2–1	1–2
Sumgayit	0–1	0–1	0–0	2–2	1–2	2–1		2–1
Zira	2–0	3–1	1–0	0–0	0–2	0–0	2–2	

Source: soccerway.com
Legend: Blue = home team win; Yellow = draw; Red = away team win.

=== Matches 15–28 ===
Home \ Away	GAB	KES	NEF	QAR	SAB	SEB	SUM	ZIR
Gabala		2–1	2–2	0–5	2–2	1–1	1–0	1–1
Keşla	3–1		0–3	1–1	0–0	1–0	0–1	2–2
Neftçi Baku	1–0	3–1		1–0	2–1	4–0	0–2	4–0
Qarabağ	3–0	2–0	1–2		2–0	1–0	4–1	1–1
Sabah	1–0	1–1	2–2	0–4		0–0	1–1	2–1
Sabail	1–0	1–1	0–4	1–1	2–0		0–1	0–0
Sumgayit	2–0	2–2	0–1	0–0	0–2	3–0		0–0
Zira	0–0	0–0	1–0	0–2	2–2	2–0	0–0	

Source: soccerway.com
Legend: Blue = home team win; Yellow = draw; Red = away team win.

== Season statistics ==
=== Top scorers ===
As of matches played 19 May 2021

Rank	Player	Club	Goals
1	(Azerbaijan) Namik Alaskarov	Neftçi	19
2	(Azerbaijan) Mahir Emreli	Qarabağ	18
3	(Croatia) Filip Ozobić	Qarabağ	11
4	(Azerbaijan) Ali Ghorbani	Sumgayit	9
5	(Georgia (country)) Davit Volkovi	Zira	8
5	(Azerbaijan) Rahim Sadikhov	Sumgayit	8
7	(Azerbaijan) Mirabdulla Abbasov	Neftçi	7
7	(Ghana) Owusu Kwabena	Qarabağ	7
9	(Azerbaijan) Amil Yunanov	Sabail	6
9	(France) Abdellah Zoubir	Qarabağ	6

=== Clean sheets ===
As of matches played 25 February 2021

Rank	Player	Club	Clean sheets
1	(Brazil) Matheus Albino	Zira	7
2	(Azerbaijan) Shahrudin Mahammadaliyev	Qarabağ	6
3	(Azerbaijan) Agil Mammadov	Neftçi	5
4	(Azerbaijan) Anar Nazirov	Gabala	4
4	(Russia) Mehdi Jannatov	Sumgayit	4
6	(Moldova) Stanislav Namașco	Keşla	3
6	(Guatemala) Nicholas Hagen	Sabail	3
8	(Serbia) Saša Stamenković	Sabah	2
8	(Azerbaijan) Aydin Bayramov	Sumgayit	2

== See also ==
- Azerbaijan Premier League
- Azerbaijan First Division
- Azerbaijan Cup
