= 2020–21 Sabail FK season =

Sabail
2020-21 season
- Chairman: Rashad Abdullayev
- Manager: Aftandil Hajiyev
- Stadium: ASCO Arena
- Premier League: 8th
- Azerbaijan Cup: Quarterfinal vs Sumgayit
- Top goalscorer: League: Amil Yunanov(6); All: Amil Yunanov (8)
Home colours	Away colours

The Sabail FK 2020–21 season was Sabail's fourth Azerbaijan Premier League season, and their fifth season in existence. They finished the season eighth in the Premier League and reached the Quarterfinals of the Azerbaijan Cup.

== Season events ==
On 17 July, Sabail announced a new contract had been signed with Head Coach Aftandil Hajiyev for the 2020/2021 season.

On 20 July, Sabail announced that they had agreed new one-year contracts with Rauf Aliyev, Lema Mabidi, Kamal Bayramov, Orkhan Gurbanli, Peyman Keshavarz, Elchin Rahimli, Adil Naghiyev and Bahadur Haziyev.

On 23 July, Rahid Amirguliyev extended his contract with Sabail until the end of the 2020–21 season.

On 3 September, Sabail announced the signing of Afran Ismayilov. The following day, 4 September, Sabail announced the signing of Nicholas Hagen to a one-year contract.

On 18 September, Sabail announced the signing of Amil Yunanov.

On 30 September, Sabail's match against Qarabağ scheduled for 4 October was postponed to allow Azerbaijan additional preparation time for their upcoming UEFA Nations League matches.

On 14 November, Sabail announced the signing of Iranian international Bakhtiar Rahmani on a contract until the end of the season.

On 8 January, Sabail announced that Bakhtiar Rahmani had left the club after his contract by mutual consent, with Elgun Nabiyev leaving a day later by the same manner.

On 19 January, Sabail announced the signing of Luka Imnadze on a contract until the end of the season.

On 30 January, Sabail announced the signing of Milovan Petrovikj on a contract until the end of the season.

On 31 January, Sabail announced the signing of Alie Sesay on a contract until the end of the season.

== Squad ==
As of match played 19 May 2021

No.	Name	Nationality	Position	Date of birth (age)	Signed from	Signed in	Contract ends	Apps.	Goals
Goalkeepers
1	Kamran Agayev	(Azerbaijan)	GK	9 February 1986 (aged 35)		2020	2021	3	0
12	Shahin Zakiyev	(Azerbaijan)	GK	11 June 1999 (aged 21)	Keşla	2020		0	0
25	Elkhan Ahmadov	(Azerbaijan)	GK	2 July 1993 (aged 27)	Mil-Muğan	2017		11	0
96	Nicholas Hagen	(Guatemala)	GK	2 August 1996 (aged 24)	Municipal	2020	2021	27	0
Defenders
2	Arsen Agjabayov	(Azerbaijan)	DF	11 September 2000 (aged 20)	Sabah	2020		1	0
3	Turan Manafov	(Azerbaijan)	DF	19 September 1998 (aged 22)	Zagatala	2019		46	1
4	Alie Sesay	(Sierra Leone)	DF	2 August 1994 (aged 26)	Zira	2021		13	0
16	Peyman Keshavarz	(Iran)	DF	3 March 1996 (aged 25)		2020	2021	20	2
26	Kamal Gurbanov	(Azerbaijan)	DF	6 May 1994 (aged 27)	Neftchi Baku	2017		38	0
28	Magsad Isayev	(Azerbaijan)	DF	7 June 1994 (aged 26)	Sabah	2020		22	0
30	Murad Gayali	(Azerbaijan)	DF	9 March 1999 (aged 22)	Keşla	2020	2022	0	0
34	Urfan Abbasov	(Azerbaijan)	DF	14 October 1992 (aged 28)	Gabala	2019		53	2
55	Adil Naghiyev	(Azerbaijan)	DF	11 September 1995 (aged 25)	Sumgayit	2019	2021	44	2
Midfielders
5	Vugar Beybalayev	(Azerbaijan)	MF	5 August 1993 (aged 27)	Sumgayit	2018		36	0
6	Orkhan Gurbanli	(Azerbaijan)	MF	12 July 1995 (aged 25)	Neftchi Baku	2018	2021	15	1
7	Mirsahib Abbasov	(Azerbaijan)	MF	19 January 1993 (aged 28)	Zira	2019		27	1
13	Ali Sadikhov	(Azerbaijan)	MF	13 August 1999 (aged 21)	Gabala	2019		8	0
14	Rahid Amirguliyev	(Azerbaijan)	MF	1 September 1989 (aged 31)	Qarabağ	2018	2021	80	0
17	Elchin Rahimli	(Azerbaijan)	MF	17 June 1996 (aged 24)	Qarabağ	2018	2021	33	0
20	Ruslan Hajiyev	(Azerbaijan)	MF	20 March 1998 (aged 23)	loan from Qarabağ	2020		17	0
22	Afran Ismayilov	(Azerbaijan)	MF	8 October 1988 (aged 32)	Keşla	2020		24	5
23	Milovan Petrovikj	(North Macedonia)	MF	23 January 1990 (aged 31)	Vardar	2021	2021	15	0
27	Hendrick Ekstein	(South Africa)	MF	1 January 1991 (aged 30)	Sabah	2020		29	3
77	Adilkhan Garahmadov	(Azerbaijan)	MF	5 June 2001 (aged 19)	Academy	2018		33	2
Forwards
9	Florijan Kadriu	(North Macedonia)	FW	29 August 1996 (aged 24)	Renova	2020	2021	20	0
11	Rauf Aliyev	(Azerbaijan)	FW	12 February 1989 (aged 32)	Neftçi	2020	2021	29	7
19	Luka Imnadze	(Georgia (country))	FW	26 August 1997 (aged 23)	Samtredia	2021	2021	15	0
29	Amil Yunanov	(Azerbaijan)	FW	6 January 1993 (aged 28)	Sumgayit	2020		20	8
Left during the season
8	Lema Mabidi	(Democratic Republic of the Congo)	MF	11 June 1993 (aged 27)	Raja Casablanca	2020	2021	6	0
8	Bakhtiar Rahmani	(Iran)	MF	23 September 1991 (aged 29)	Sanat Naft Abadan	2020	2021	3	0
19	Elgun Nabiyev	(Azerbaijan)	MF	4 January 1996 (aged 25)	Sabah	2020		2	0
99	Bahadur Haziyev	(Azerbaijan)	FW	26 March 1999 (aged 22)	MOIK Baku	2020	2021	10	1

== Transfers ==
=== In ===
Date	Position	Nationality	Name	From	Fee	Ref.
19 July 2020	DF	(Azerbaijan)	Magsad Isayev	Sabah	Undisclosed	
4 August 2020	FW	(North Macedonia)	Florian Kadriu	Renova	Undisclosed	
4 August 2020	MF	(Azerbaijan)	Elgun Nabiyev	Sabah	Undisclosed	
25 August 2020	GK	(Azerbaijan)	Kamran Agayev		Free	
3 September 2020	MF	(Azerbaijan)	Afran Ismayilov	Keşla	Free	
4 September 2020	GK	(Guatemala)	Nicholas Hagen	Municipal	Undisclosed	
18 September 2020	FW	(Azerbaijan)	Amil Yunanov	Sumgayit	Free	
14 November 2020	MF	(Iran)	Bakhtiar Rahmani	Sanat Naft Abadan	Undisclosed	
19 January 2021	FW	(Georgia (country))	Luka Imnadze	Samtredia	Undisclosed	
30 January 2021	MF	(North Macedonia)	Milovan Petrovikj	Vardar	Undisclosed	
31 January 2021	DF	(Sierra Leone)	Alie Sesay	Zira	Free	

=== Loans in ===
Date from	Position	Nationality	Name	From	Date to	Ref.
Summer 2020	MF	(Azerbaijan)	Ruslan Hajiyev	Qarabağ	End of season	

=== Out ===
Date	Position	Nationality	Name	To	Fee	Ref.
10 February 2021	FW	(Azerbaijan)	Bahadur Haziyev	Keşla	Undisclosed	

=== Released ===
Date	Position	Nationality	Name	Joined	Date	Ref.
17 July 2020	DF	(Azerbaijan)	Shahriyar Rahimov	Zira	19 July 2020	
17 July 2020	MF	(Ghana)	Michael Essien	Retired		
18 July 2020	DF	(Azerbaijan)	Eltun Yagublu	Retired		
7 August 2020	DF	(Brazil)	Erico Silva	UTA Arad	10 August 2020	
12 August 2020	GK	(Azerbaijan)	Kamal Bayramov	Keşla	14 August 2020	
13 August 2020	GK	(Ukraine)	Oleksandr Rybka	Liepāja		
5 October 2020	MF	(Democratic Republic of the Congo)	Lema Mabidi	Al-Quwa Al-Jawiya		
8 January 2021	MF	(Iran)	Bakhtiar Rahmani	Dalkurd	13 January 2021	
9 January 2021	MF	(Azerbaijan)	Elgun Nabiyev			
31 May 2021	MF	(North Macedonia)	Milovan Petrovikj			
31 May 2021	FW	(Georgia (country))	Luka Imnadze	Akzhayik		
31 May 2021	FW	(North Macedonia)	Florijan Kadriu	Struga		
7 June 2021	DF	(Sierra Leone)	Alie Sesay	Persebaya Surabaya		
9 June 2021	DF	(Azerbaijan)	Urfan Abbasov	Gabala	9 June 2021	
18 June 2021	DF	(Azerbaijan)	Magsad Isayev	Gabala	18 June 2021	
14 June 2021	FW	(Azerbaijan)	Amil Yunanov	Keşla	1 July 2021	

== Friendlies ==
14 January 2021	Sabah	1 – 0	Sabail	Masazır
AZT (UTC+4)	Diniyev 53'	Report		Stadium: Bank Respublika Arena

== Competitions ==
=== Overview ===
Competition	First match	Last match	Starting round	Final position	Record							
Competition	First match	Last match	Starting round	Final position	Pld	W	D	L	GF	GA	GD	Win %
Premier League	21 August 2020	19 May 2021	Matchday 1	8th	28	5	9	14	21	42	−21	17.86
Azerbaijan Cup	24 January 2021	6 February 2021	Last 16	Quarterfinal	3	2	0	1	5	2	+3	66.67
Total					31	7	9	15	26	44	−18	22.58

Last updated: 19 May 2021
Source: Competitions

=== Premier League ===
==== Results summary ====
Overall								Home						Away					
Pld	W	D	L	GF	GA	GD	Pts	W	D	L	GF	GA	GD	W	D	L	GF	GA	GD
28	5	9	14	22	43	−21	24	4	5	5	14	19	−5	1	4	9	8	24	−16

Last updated: 19 May 2021.
Source: See Results

==== Results by round ====
Round	1	2	3	4	5	6	7	8	9	10	11	12	13	14	15	16	17	18	19	20	21	22	23	24	25	26	27	28
Ground	A	H	A	H	H	A	A	H	A	H	A	H	H	A	A	H	A	H	A	A	H	A	H	A	H	H	A	H
Result	L	L	L	W	D	D	D	W	L	D	W	L	L	L	L	W	L	D	D	L	D	D	D	L	W	L	L	L
Position	6	8	8	7	7	7	7	6	6	7	5	7	6	6	7	6	6	6	6	6	6	6	6	8	7	8	8	8

Updated to match(es) played on 19 May 2021. Source: See Results
A = Away; H = Home; W = Win; D = Draw; L = Loss

==== Results ====
21 August 2020 1	Neftçi	2 – 1	Sabail	Baku
20:30 AZT (UTC+4)	Alaskarov 16', 66'; Krivotsyuk (yellow card) 57'; Mahmudov (yellow card) 90+3'; Lawal (yellow card) 90+4'; M.Kane (yellow card) 90+5'	Report	P.Keshavarz 79'; Kadriu (yellow card) 90+2'	Stadium: Bakcell Arena; Attendance: 0 Referee: Rauf Jabbarov
Note: Match played behind closed doors due to the COVID-19 pandemic.

12 September 2020 2	Sabail	1 – 2	Zira	Baku
19:00 AZT (UTC+4)	Amirguliyev (yellow card) 24'; Isayev (yellow card) 38'; Haziyev (yellow card) 44'; U.Abbasov 81' (pen.)	Report	Bayramli (yellow card) 24'; Rahimov (yellow card) 45'; Volkovi 47'; Jamalov (yellow card) 50'; Gurbanov 67' (pen.); Đorđević (yellow card) 78'	Stadium: Bayil Arena; Attendance: 0 Referee: Vugar Hasanli
Note: Match played behind closed doors due to the COVID-19 pandemic.

19 September 2020 3	Sumgayit	2 – 1	Sabail	Sumqayit
19:15 AZT (UTC+4)	Ahmadov 10'; Ghorbani (yellow card) 25' (goal) 33'; Najafov (yellow card) 37'; Mustafayev (yellow card) 88'; Turabov (yellow card) 90+1'	Report	Aliyev 22' (yellow card) 74'; Naghiyev (yellow card) 62'; P.Keshavarz (yellow card) 79'; Hajiyev (yellow card) 85'	Stadium: Kapital Bank Arena; Attendance: 0 Referee: Orkhan Mammadov
Note: Match played behind closed doors due to the COVID-19 pandemic.

26 September 2020 4	Sabail	2 – 1	Sabah	Baku
18:00 AZT (UTC+4)	Manafov (yellow card) 26'; Kadriu (yellow card) 33'; Ismayilov 56' (pen.) (yellow card) 56'; Aliyev 71'; Ekstein (yellow card) 80'	Report	Marina (yellow card) 15'; Sheydayev 27' (pen.); Kökçü (yellow card) 32'; Khalilzade (yellow card) 87'; Diniyev (yellow card) 90+4'	Stadium: Bayil Arena; Attendance: 0 Referee: Elcin Masiyev
Note: Match played behind closed doors due to the COVID-19 pandemic.

17 October 2020 6	Sabail	1 – 1	Keşla	Baku
14:00 AZT (UTC+4)	Naghiyev (yellow card) 7' (yellow-red card) 83'; Haziyev 51'	Report	S.Aliyev (yellow card) 12'; Ru.Hajiyev 49'; Isgandarli (yellow card) 63'; Sílvio (yellow card) 72'	Stadium: Bayil Arena; Attendance: 0 Referee: Sanuhi Bayramov
Note: Match played behind closed doors due to the COVID-19 pandemic.

24 October 2020 7	Gabala	1 – 1	Sabail	Qabala
14:00 AZT (UTC+4)	Goxha 4'; Gigauri (yellow card) 85'	Report	Ekstein 26'; P.Keshavarzi (yellow card) 70'; Rahimli (yellow card) 86'	Stadium: Gabala City Stadium; Attendance: 0 Referee: Ingilab Mammadov
Note: Match played behind closed doors due to the COVID-19 pandemic.

31 October 2020 8	Zira	0 – 0	Sabail	Zirə
16:00 AZT (UTC+4)		Report	U.Abbasov (yellow card) 7'; Kadriu (yellow card) 42'; Beybalayev (yellow card) 74'	Stadium: Zira Olympic Sport Complex Stadium; Attendance: 0 Referee: Orkhan Mammadov
Note: Match played behind closed doors due to the COVID-19 pandemic.

7 November 2020 9	Sabail	2 – 1	Sumgayit	Baku
16:00 AZT (UTC+4)	Aliyev 42'; P.Keshavarz (yellow card) 65'; Naghiyev 77' (yellow card) 77'; Manafov (yellow card) 82'	Report	Hemati (yellow card) 8'; Khachayev (yellow card) 44'; Khodzhaniyazov (yellow card) 50'; Sadykhov 84' (pen.); Hüseynov (yellow card) 90+3'; Mammadov (yellow card) 90+6'	Stadium: Bayil Arena; Attendance: 0 Referee: Aliyar Agayev
Note: Match played behind closed doors due to the COVID-19 pandemic.

23 November 2020 10	Sabah	2 – 1	Sabail	Masazır
16:00 AZT (UTC+4)	A.Diallo 11'; Seydiyev 33'; Marina (yellow card) 67'; Stamenković (yellow card) 90+4'	Report	Aliyev (yellow card) 59' (goal) 90+5' (pen.); Naghiyev (yellow card) 90+5'	Stadium: Bank Respublika Arena; Attendance: 0 Referee: Raad Ahmadov
Note: Match played behind closed doors due to the COVID-19 pandemic.

29 November 2020 11	Sabail	1 – 1	Qarabağ	Baku
16:00 AZT (UTC+4)	Yunanov 57' (pen.)	Report	Jafarguliyev (yellow card) 56'; Guerrier 64'	Stadium: Bayil Arena; Attendance: 0 Referee: Elcin Masiyev
Note: Match played behind closed doors due to the COVID-19 pandemic.

20 December 2020 12	Keşla	0 – 2	Sabail	Baku
16:00 AZT (UTC+4)	Isgandarli (yellow card) 50'	Report	U.Abbasov 12'; Ismayilov 18'; Naghiyev (yellow card) 68'	Stadium: ASK Arena; Attendance: 0 Referee: Ravan Hamzazada
Note: Match originally scheduled for 5 December, but postponed. Match played behind closed doors due to the COVID-19 pandemic.

24 December 2020 13	Sabail	1 – 3	Gabala	Baku
16:00 AZT (UTC+4)	U.Abbasov (yellow card) 4'; Aliyev (yellow card) 36'; Manafov 52'	Report	Musayev (yellow card) 16'; Isgandarov 20'; Mammadov 28' (yellow card) 56'; Adeniyi 90+3'	Stadium: Bayil Arena; Attendance: 0 Referee: Aliyar Agayev
Note: Match played behind closed doors due to the COVID-19 pandemic.

21 January 2021 14	Sabail	1 – 3	Neftçi	Baku
16:00 AZT (UTC+4)	Ismayilov 29' (pen.) (yellow card) 39'; Beybalayev (yellow card) 50'	Report	Bougrine (yellow card) 12' (goal) 45', 90'; Thallyson (yellow card) 26'; Mammadov (yellow card) 28'; Mahmudov 51'; Çelik (yellow card) 73'; Telushi (yellow card) 85'	Stadium: Bayil Arena; Attendance: 0 Referee: Kamal Umudlu
Note: Match played behind closed doors due to the COVID-19 pandemic.

28 January 2021 5	Qarabağ	4 – 0	Sabail	Baku
16:00 AZT (UTC+4)	Kwabena 18'; Emreli 25', 90+2'; Andrade 85'	Report	Naghiyev (yellow card) 80'	Stadium: Azersun Arena; Attendance: 0 Referee: Elcin Masiyev
Note: Match originally scheduled for 4 October, but postponed on 30 September.

13 February 2021 15	Sumgayit	3 – 0	Sabail	Sumqayit
16:00 AZT (UTC+4)	Khachayev 26'; Mutallimov 33'; Turabov (yellow card) 47'; Ghorbani 83' (pen.)	Report	Imnadze (yellow card) 21'; P.Keshavarz (yellow card) 25' (yellow-red card) 55'; Aliyev (yellow card) 35'; Amirguliyev (yellow card) 55'; Petrovikj (yellow card) 59'; U.Abbasov (yellow card) 68'; Agayev (red card) 90+5'	Stadium: Kapital Bank Arena; Attendance: 0 Referee: Vugar Hasanli
Note: Match played behind closed doors due to the COVID-19 pandemic.

19 February 2021 16	Sabail	2 – 0	Sabah	Baku
16:00 AZT (UTC+4)	Yunanov 17', 78' (yellow card) 57'; Imnadze (yellow card) 27'; Petrovikj (yellow card) 46'	Report	Fofana (yellow card) 37'; Koubemba (yellow card) 38'; S.Seyidov (yellow card) 66'	Stadium: Bayil Arena; Attendance: 0 Referee: Rahim Hasanov
Note: Match played behind closed doors due to the COVID-19 pandemic.

25 February 2021 17	Qarabağ	1 – 0	Sabail	Baku
18:30 AZT (UTC+4)	Romero 72'; Garayev (yellow card) 82'	Report	U.Abbasov (yellow card) 88'	Stadium: Azersun Arena; Attendance: 0 Referee: Rauf Jabbarov
Note: Match played behind closed doors due to the COVID-19 pandemic.

2 March 2021 18	Sabail	1 – 1	Keşla	Baku
16:00 AZT (UTC+4)	P.Keshavarz 75' (yellow card) 78'; Aliyev (yellow card) 75'	Report	Akhundov 54'; Aliyev (yellow card) 72'; Abang (yellow card) 75'; Guliyev (yellow card) 82'	Stadium: Bayil Arena; Attendance: 0 Referee: Aliyar Agayev
Note: Match played behind closed doors due to the COVID-19 pandemic.

9 March 2021 19	Gabala	1 – 1	Sabail	Qabala
15:00 AZT (UTC+4)	Ahmadov (yellow card) 43' (yellow-red card) 88'; Utzig 78'	Report	Yunanov (yellow card) 37' (goal) 57'; Ismayilov (yellow card) 58'; Hajiyev (red card) 67'	Stadium: Gabala City Stadium; Attendance: 0 Referee: Raad Ahmadov

14 March 2021 20	Neftçi	4 – 0	Sabail	Baku
17:15 AZT (UTC+4)	Alaskarov 5' (yellow card) 45+1'; Joseph-Monrose 66'; Lawal 70'; Çelik 75'	Report	Ismayilov (yellow card) 18'; Yunanov (yellow card) 27'; Petrovikj (yellow card) 30'; Abbasov (yellow card) 43'	Stadium: Eighth Kilometer District Stadium; Attendance: 0 Referee: Kamal Umudlu
Note: Match played behind closed doors due to the COVID-19 pandemic.

3 April 2021 21	Sabail	0 – 0	Zira	Baku
17:30 AZT (UTC+4)		Report	Huseynov (yellow card) 60'; Aliyev (yellow card) 60'; Muradov (yellow card) 85'; Hajili; (yellow card) 87'; N.Andjelkovic (yellow card) 90+4'	Stadium: Bayil Arena; Attendance: 0 Referee: Elchin Masiyev
Note: Match played behind closed doors due to the COVID-19 pandemic.

10 April 2021 22	Sabah	0 – 0	Sabail	Masazır
18:00 AZT (UTC+4)	Marina (yellow card) 20'; Ivanović (yellow card) 43'; Isayev (yellow card) 58'; Sheydayev (yellow card) 88'	Report	Isayev (yellow card) 34' (yellow-red card) 90+2'; Manafov (yellow card) 83'; Naghiyev (yellow card) 88'	Stadium: Bank Respublika Arena; Attendance: 0 Referee: Kamal Umudlu
Note: Match played behind closed doors due to the COVID-19 pandemic.

16 April 2021 23	Sabail	1 – 1	Qarabağ	Baku
18:00 AZT (UTC+4)	Yunanov (yellow card) 27' (goal) 38' (pen.)	Report	Matić 42'; Andrade (yellow card) 45+2'; Jafarguliyev (yellow card) 90+3'	Stadium: Bayil Arena; Attendance: 0 Referee: Aliyar Agayev
Note: Match played behind closed doors due to the COVID-19 pandemic.

25 April 2021 24	Keşla	1 – 0	Sabail	Baku
18:00 AZT (UTC+4)	Akhundov (yellow card) 29'; Meza (yellow card) 45' (goal) 51'; Salahli (yellow card) 71'; Namașco (yellow card) 90+1'	Report		Stadium: ASK Arena; Attendance: 0 Referee: Rauf Jabbarov
Note: Match played behind closed doors due to the COVID-19 pandemic.

3 May 2021 25	Sabail	1 – 0	Gabala	Baku
20:15 AZT (UTC+4)	Ekstein (yellow card) 38'; Yunanov 61'; Abbasov (yellow card) 84'; Rahimli (yellow card) 88'	Report	Gigauri (yellow card) 20' (yellow-red card) 51'; Goxha (yellow card) 86'	Stadium: Bayil Arena; Attendance: 0 Referee: Ingilab Mammadov
Note: Match played behind closed doors due to the COVID-19 pandemic.

8 May 2021 26	Sabail	0 – 4	Neftçi	Baku
20:15 AZT (UTC+4)	L.Imnadze (yellow card) 23'; Hagen (yellow card) 78'	Report	Stanković 13'; Lawal (yellow card) 62'; Bougrine (yellow card) 64'; Honda 72'; Alaskarov 79' (pen.); Çelik (yellow card) 85'; Krivotsyuk (yellow card) 88'	Stadium: Bayil Arena; Attendance: 0 Referee: Elcin Masiyev
Note: Match played behind closed doors due to the COVID-19 pandemic.

14 May 2021 27	Zira	2 – 0	Sabail	Zirə
19:00 AZT (UTC+4)	Richard (yellow card) 4'; Ramazanov 58'; Andjelkovic 64'	Report	Abbasov (yellow card) 49'; Naghiyev (yellow card) 79'	Stadium: Zira Olympic Sport Complex Stadium; Attendance: 0 Referee: Ingilab Mammadov
Note: Match played behind closed doors due to the COVID-19 pandemic.

19 May 2021 28	Sabail	0 – 1	Sumgayit	Baku
18:00 AZT (UTC+4)	Naghiyev (yellow card) 9' (yellow-red card) 90+3'; Petrovikj (yellow card) 62'	Report	Khachayev 43'; Ahmadov (yellow card) 90'; Jannatov (yellow card) 90+4'	Stadium: Bayil Arena; Attendance: 0 Referee: Raad Ahmadov
Note: Match played behind closed doors due to the COVID-19 pandemic.

==== League table ====
Pos	Team	Pld	W	D	L	GF	GA	GD	Pts	Qualification
4	Zira	28	8	14	6	28	28	0	38	
5	Sabah	28	7	8	13	28	38	−10	29	
6	Keşla	28	5	11	12	25	40	−15	26	Qualification to Europa Conference League second qualifying round
7	Gabala	28	5	11	12	23	44	−21	26	
8	Sabail	28	5	9	14	21	42	−21	24	

Source: Soccerway
Rules for classification: 1) Points; 2) Head-to-head points; 3) Head-to-head goal difference; 4) Head-to-head goals scored; 5) Head-to-head away goals scored (only if two teams); 6) Goal difference; 7) Goals scored.

=== Azerbaijan Cup ===
24 January 2021 Last 16	Sabail	3 – 2	Zagatala	Baku
AZT (UTC+4)	P.Keshavarz (yellow card) 3'; Yunanov 26'; Naghiyev 62'; Beybalayev (yellow card) 80'; A.Ismayilov 84'	Report	R.Ismayilov 31', 40' (yellow card) 78'; V.Şabanov (yellow card) 75'; R.Nuruyev (yellow card) 80'	Stadium: Bayil Arena; Attendance: 0 Referee: Namiq Bakirov
Note: Match played behind closed doors due to the COVID-19 pandemic.

1 February 2021 Quarterfinal 1st leg	Sumgayit	0 – 1	Sabail	Sumqayit
16:00 AZT (UTC+4)	Khodzhaniyazov (yellow card) 17'; Najafov (yellow card) 23'	Report	Garahmadov (yellow card) 8'; Yunanov 12'; Imnadze (yellow card) 45+2'	Stadium: Kapital Bank Arena; Attendance: 0 Referee: Rauf Jabbarov
Note: Match played behind closed doors due to the COVID-19 pandemic.

6 February 2021 Quarterfinal 2nd leg	Sabail	1 – 2 (2 – 2 (a) agg.)	Sumgayit	Baku
18:00 AZT (UTC+4)	P.Keshavarzi (yellow card) 56'; Aliyev (yellow card) 90+5'; Ismayilov 90+6' (pen.)	Report	Sadikhov 20' (pen.); Ghorbani 23' (yellow card) 36'; Khodzhaniyazov (yellow card) 57'; Mustafayev (yellow card) 85'; Jannatov (yellow card) 90+1'	Stadium: Bayil Arena; Attendance: 0 Referee: Orkhan Mammadov
Note: Match played behind closed doors due to the COVID-19 pandemic in Azerbaijan.

== Squad statistics ==
As of Match played 19 May 2021

=== Appearances and goals ===
No.	Pos	Nat	Player	Total		Premier League		Azerbaijan Cup	
No.	Pos	Nat	Player	Apps	Goals	Apps	Goals	Apps	Goals
1	GK	(Azerbaijan) AZE	Kamran Agayev	3	0	1	0	2	0
2	DF	(Azerbaijan) AZE	Arsen Agjabayov	1	0	0+1	0	0	0
3	DF	(Azerbaijan) AZE	Turan Manafov	30	1	28	1	2	0
4	DF	(Sierra Leone) SLE	Alie Sesay	13	0	13	0	0	0
5	MF	(Azerbaijan) AZE	Vugar Beybalayev	10	0	7+2	0	1	0
7	MF	(Azerbaijan) AZE	Mirsahib Abbasov	11	0	2+8	0	1	0
9	FW	(North Macedonia) MKD	Florijan Kadriu	20	0	16+2	0	1+1	0
11	FW	(Azerbaijan) AZE	Rauf Aliyev	24	4	15+8	4	1	0
14	MF	(Azerbaijan) AZE	Rahid Amirguliyev	28	0	26	0	2	0
16	DF	(Iran) IRI	Peyman Keshavarz	18	2	14+1	2	3	0
17	MF	(Azerbaijan) AZE	Elchin Rahimli	16	0	5+10	0	1	0
19	FW	(Georgia (country)) GEO	Luka Imnadze	15	0	9+4	0	2	0
20	MF	(Azerbaijan) AZE	Ruslan Hajiyev	17	0	2+12	0	2+1	0
22	MF	(Azerbaijan) AZE	Afran Ismayilov	24	5	18+4	3	1+1	2
23	MF	(North Macedonia) MKD	Milovan Petrovikj	15	0	13	0	0+2	0
25	GK	(Azerbaijan) AZE	Elkhan Ahmadov	1	0	1	0	0	0
26	DF	(Azerbaijan) AZE	Kamal Gurbanov	3	0	0+2	0	1	0
27	MF	(South Africa) RSA	Hendrick Ekstein	23	1	20	1	2+1	0
28	DF	(Azerbaijan) AZE	Magsad Isayev	22	0	13+7	0	1+1	0
29	FW	(Azerbaijan) AZE	Amil Yunanov	20	8	12+5	6	2+1	2
34	DF	(Azerbaijan) AZE	Urfan Abbasov	29	2	27	2	2	0
55	DF	(Azerbaijan) AZE	Adil Naghiyev	27	2	24	1	2+1	1
77	MF	(Azerbaijan) AZE	Adilkhan Garahmadov	17	0	3+11	0	3	0
96	GK	(Guatemala) GUA	Nicholas Hagen	27	0	26	0	1	0
Players away from Sabail on loan:
Players who left Sabail during the season:
8	MF	(Democratic Republic of the Congo) COD	Lema Mabidi	4	0	4	0	0	0
8	MF	(Iran) IRI	Bakhtiar Rahmani	3	0	3	0	0	0
19	MF	(Azerbaijan) AZE	Elgun Nabiyev	2	0	0+2	0	0	0
99	MF	(Azerbaijan) AZE	Bahadur Haziyev	9	1	6+3	1	0	0

=== Goal scorers ===
Place	Position	Nation	Number	Name	Premier League	Azerbaijan Cup	Total
1	FW	(Azerbaijan)	29	Amil Yunanov	6	2	8
2	MF	(Azerbaijan)	22	Afran Ismayilov	3	2	5
3	FW	(Azerbaijan)	11	Rauf Aliyev	4	0	4
4	DF	(Azerbaijan)	34	Urfan Abbasov	2	0	2
4	DF	(Iran)	16	Peyman Keshavarz	2	0	2
4	DF	(Azerbaijan)	55	Adil Naghiyev	1	1	2
7	MF	(Azerbaijan)	99	Bahadur Haziyev	1	0	1
7	MF	(South Africa)	27	Hendrick Ekstein	1	0	1
7	DF	(Azerbaijan)	3	Turan Manafov	1	0	1
				TOTALS	21	5	26

=== Clean sheets ===
Place	Position	Nation	Number	Name	Premier League	Azerbaijan Cup	Total
1	GK	(Guatemala)	96	Nicholas Hagen	6	0	6
2	GK	(Azerbaijan)	1	Kamran Agayev	0	1	1
				TOTALS	6	1	7

=== Disciplinary record ===
Number	Nation	Position	Name	Premier League		Azerbaijan Cup		Total	
Number	Nation	Position	Name	Booked	Sent off (straight red)	Booked	Sent off (straight red)	Booked	Sent off (straight red)
1	(Azerbaijan)	GK	Kamran Agayev	0	1	0	0	0	1
3	(Azerbaijan)	DF	Turan Manafov	3	0	0	0	3	0
5	(Azerbaijan)	MF	Vugar Beybalayev	2	0	1	0	3	0
7	(Azerbaijan)	MF	Mirsahib Abbasov	1	0	0	0	1	0
9	(North Macedonia)	FW	Florijan Kadriu	3	0	0	0	3	0
11	(Azerbaijan)	FW	Rauf Aliyev	5	0	1	0	6	0
14	(Azerbaijan)	MF	Rahid Amirguliyev	2	0	0	0	2	0
16	(Iran)	DF	Peyman Keshavarz	6	1	2	0	8	1
17	(Azerbaijan)	MF	Elchin Rahimli	2	0	0	0	2	0
19	(Georgia (country))	FW	Luka Imnadze	3	0	1	0	4	0
20	(Azerbaijan)	MF	Ruslan Hajiyev	1	1	0	0	1	1
22	(Azerbaijan)	MF	Afran Ismayilov	4	0	0	0	4	0
23	(North Macedonia)	MF	Milovan Petrovikj	4	0	0	0	4	0
27	(South Africa)	MF	Hendrick Ekstein	2	0	0	0	2	0
28	(Azerbaijan)	DF	Magsad Isayev	3	1	0	0	3	1
29	(Azerbaijan)	FW	Amil Yunanov	4	0	0	0	4	0
34	(Azerbaijan)	DF	Urfan Abbasov	6	0	0	0	6	0
55	(Azerbaijan)	DF	Adil Naghiyev	11	2	0	0	11	2
77	(Azerbaijan)	MF	Adilkhan Garahmadov	0	0	1	0	1	0
96	(Guatemala)	GK	Nicholas Hagen	1	0	0	0	1	0
Players who left Sabail during the season:
99	(Azerbaijan)	MF	Bahadur Haziyev	1	0	0	0	1	0
			TOTALS	64	6	6	0	70	6
