= Hendrick Ekstein =

South African footballer

Personal information
- Date of birth: 1 January 1991 (age 35)
- Place of birth: Bekkersdal, South Africa
- Height: 1.74 m (5 ft 9 in)
- Position: Midfielder

Team information
- Current team: AmaZulu
- Number: 27

Youth career
- Kaizer Chiefs

Senior career*
Years	Team	Apps	(Gls)
2010–2019	Kaizer Chiefs	89	(13)
2019	Sabah	13	(3)
2020–2021	Sabail	26	(3)
2021–	AmaZulu	82	(9)

International career^{‡}
2015	South Africa	3	(0)
- * Club domestic league appearances and goals as of 4 January 2026 ‡ National team caps and goals as of 23 October 2022

Hendrick Ekstein (born 1 January 1991) is a South African soccer player who plays as a midfielder for South African Premier Division side AmaZulu.

== Club career ==
Hendrick Ekstein hails from the development of Kaizer Chiefs, he was promoted to the first team in 2014, when he was only 23 years old. Even though Kaizer Chiefs had different coaches during his stint (3), they all saw fit to play him, not regularly of course. But that was not the main reason for his departure. Ekstein left chiefs after negotiations for a new contract fell through, pule felt he deserved a certain amount while Kaizer Chiefs disagreed. He left as a free agent in 2019 and went on to join Sabah FC.

On 28 June 2019, Ekstein signed a two-year contract with Azerbaijan Premier League side Sabah FC. On 23 December 2019, Ekstein left Sabah by mutual consent. On 21 January 2020, Ekstein signed for fellow Azerbaijan Premier League club Sabail FK. On 11 September 2020, Ekstein was suspended by Sabail for a breach of discipline.

On 15 July 2021, Ekstein left Sabail after his contract expired.

== Career statistics ==
=== Club ===
As of match played 19 May 2021

Appearances and goals by club, season and competition
Club	Season	League			National Cup		League Cup		Continental		Other		Total	
Club	Season	Division	Apps	Goals	Apps	Goals	Apps	Goals	Apps	Goals	Apps	Goals	Apps	Goals
Kaizer Chiefs	2014–15	South African Premier Division	2	0	1	0	0	0	-		0 (Note: Appearances and goals in the MTN 8)	0	3	0
Kaizer Chiefs	2015–16	South African Premier Division	10	0	0	0	2	0	-		1	1	13	1
Kaizer Chiefs	2016–17	South African Premier Division	18	1	3	0	1	0	-		1	0	23	1
Kaizer Chiefs	2017–18	South African Premier Division	20	1	4	0	3	1	-		1	0	28	2
Kaizer Chiefs	2018–19	South African Premier Division	19	1	3	1	1	1	-		0	0	23	3
Kaizer Chiefs	Total		69	3	10	1	7	2	-	-	3	1	90	7
Sabah	2019–20	Azerbaijan Premier League	13	3	3	0	-		-		-		16	3
Sabail	2019–20	Azerbaijan Premier League	6	2	0	0	-		-		-		6	2
Sabail	2020–21	Azerbaijan Premier League	20	1	3	0	-		-		-		23	1
Sabail	Total		26	3	3	0	-	-	-	-	-	-	29	3
Career total			108	9	16	1	7	2	-	-	3	1	135	13
