= Vicente Gómez (footballer, born 1971) =

Spanish football manager and former player

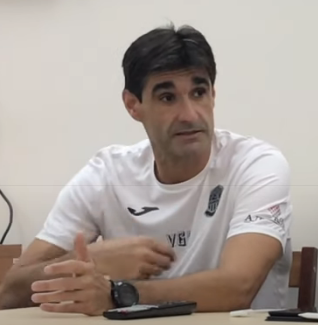
- Gómez with Olimpik Donetsk in 2019

Personal information
- Full name: Vicente Gómez Fernández
- Date of birth: 9 September 1971 (age 55)
- Place of birth: Santurtzi, Spain
- Position: Defender

Senior career*
Years	Team	Apps	(Gls)
1989–1993	Santurtzi	70	(1)

Managerial career
- 2000–2006: Athletic Bilbao (youth)
- 2006–2007: Athletic Bilbao (assistant)
- 2012–2014: Basconia
- 2014–2016: Dynamo Kyiv U21
- 2016–2017: Dynamo Kyiv (assistant)
- 2017–2018: Al-Ahli Saudi (assistant)
- 2018: Spartak Moscow (assistant)
- 2019: Dynamo Kyiv (assistant)
- 2019–2020: Olimpik Donetsk
- 2020–2021: Sabah
- 2021–2023: Al Ain (assistant)
- 2023–2026: Ukraine (assistant)
- * Club domestic league appearances and goals

Vicente Gómez Fernández (born 9 September 1971) is a Spanish football manager.

== Football career ==
Born in Santurtzi, Greater Bilbao, he was known as Vicen in his playing career as a defender. In three Segunda División B seasons for hometown club CD Santurtzi, he played 70 games and scored once in a 2–1 loss at Beasain KE on 7 February 1993.

Gómez began his coaching career with minor roles at Athletic Bilbao, later becoming manager of their farm team, CD Basconia of the Tercera División. In 2014, he moved to Ukraine's FC Dynamo Kyiv and their under-19 and under-21 teams. Two years later, he was made assistant to Serhii Rebrov, the first-team manager.

After further roles as right-hand man at Al Ahli Saudi FC and FC Spartak Moscow, on 3 September 2019 Gómez returned to Ukraine to become head coach of Olimpik Donetsk.

On 10 July 2020, Gómez was hired at Sabah FC of the Azerbaijan Premier League on a two-year contract.

== See also ==
- Raúl Riancho
