= Dmytro Klyots =

Ukrainian footballer (born 1996)

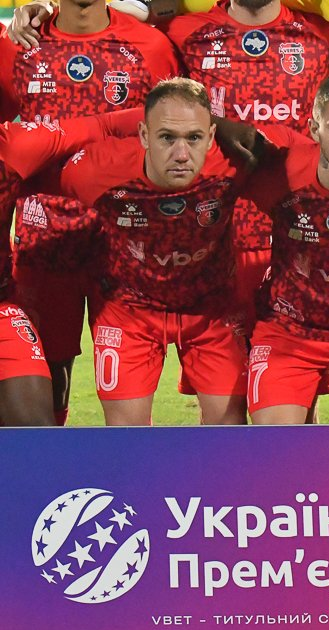

Personal information
- Full name: Dmytro Vitaliyovych Klyots
- Date of birth: 15 April 1996 (age 30)
- Place of birth: Rivne, Ukraine
- Height: 1.74 m (5 ft 9 in)
- Position: Central midfielder

Team information
- Current team: Chornomorets Odesa
- Number: 88

Youth career
- 2009–2010: Veres Rivne
- 2010–2013: UFK Lviv

Senior career*
Years	Team	Apps	(Gls)
2013–2020	Karpaty Lviv	101	(2)
2020	Keşla	13	(1)
2021	Sabah	6	(0)
2021–2026	Veres Rivne	94	(8)
2026–	Chornomorets Odesa	1	(0)

International career^{‡}
2012	Ukraine U16	2	(0)
2012	Ukraine U17	5	(0)
2013–2014	Ukraine U18	8	(0)
2015	Ukraine U19	3	(0)
- * Club domestic league appearances and goals as of 2 August 2026 ‡ National team caps and goals as of 28 June 2015

Dmytro Vitaliyovych Klyots (Ukrainian: Дмитро Віталійович Кльоц; born 15 April 1996) is a Ukrainian professional footballer who plays as a central midfielder for Chornomorets Odesa.

== Career ==
Klyots is a product of the Veres Rivne and UFK Lviv youth systems. His first trainers at UFK were Roman Hnativ and Vitaliy Lobasyuk.

He debuted for FC Karpaty on 1 March 2015, in a game against FC Metalurh Donetsk in the Ukrainian Premier League.

On 7 August 2020, Klyots signed a contract with Keşla FK until the end of the 2020–21 season. On 29 August 2021, he scored against Desna Chernihiv in the Ukrainian Premier League during the 2021–22 season at the Stadion Yuri Gagarin.

On 6 July 2026, Klyots signed a contract with Chornomorets Odesa. As a player for Chornomorets, he made his debut against Polissya Zhytomyr on 2 August 2026.

== International ==
He has also played for various Ukrainian youth national football teams.

== Honours ==
Individual

- Ukrainian Premier League Player of the Month: 2022–23 (August-September)
