= Tiemoko Fofana =

Ivorian footballer

Personal information
- Date of birth: 22 October 1999 (age 27)
- Place of birth: Abidjan, Ivory Coast
- Height: 1.80 m (5 ft 11 in)
- Position: Forward

Youth career
- –2017: Right to Dream Academy
- 2018: Nordsjælland

Senior career*
Years	Team	Apps	(Gls)
2018–2021	Ilves	44	(8)
2018	→ HJS (loan)	1	(0)
2021	→ Sabah (loan)	12	(2)
2021–2023	Sabah	20	(3)
2023	Haka	9	(0)
2023–2024	EIF	20	(7)
- * Club domestic league appearances and goals as of 27 November 2024

Tiemoko Fofana (born 22 October 1999) is an Ivorian footballer who plays as a forward.

== Career ==
=== Club ===
On 11 January 2021, Sabah announced the signing of Fofana on loan from Ilves for the remainder of the 2020–21 season.

On 17 May 2023, Fofana returned to Finland for the 2023 season and signed with Haka.

On 25 July 2023, Fofana switched to Ekenäs IF, who play in Ykkönen.

== Career statistics ==
As of 27 November 2024.

Appearances and goals by club, season and competition
Club	Season	League			National Cup		League Cup		Continental		Total	
Club	Season	Division	Apps	Goals	Apps	Goals	Apps	Goals	Apps	Goals	Apps	Goals
Ilves	2018	Veikkausliiga	2	1	0	0	–		–		2	1
Ilves	2019	Veikkausliiga	25	5	2	0	–		–		27	5
Ilves	2020	Veikkausliiga	17	2	7	2	–		0	0	24	4
Ilves	Total		44	8	9	2	–	–	0	0	53	10
HJS (loan)	2018	Kakkonen	1	0	–		–		–		1	0
Sabah (loan)	2020–21	Azerbaijan Premier League	12	2	1	0	–		–		13	2
Sabah	2021–22	Azerbaijan Premier League	20	3	2	0	–		–		22	3
Haka	2023	Veikkausliiga	9	0	1	0	0	0	2 (Note: Appearance(s) in UEFA Europa Conference League)	1	12	1
Ekenäs IF	2023	Ykkönen	8	5	–		–		–		8	5
Ekenäs IF	2024	Veikkausliiga	12	2	3	1	0	0	–		15	3
Ekenäs IF	Total		20	7	3	1	0	0	–	–	23	8
EIF Akademi	2024	Kolmonen	1	0	–		–		–		1	0
Career total			110	20	16	3	2	2	0	0	128	24
