= Álvaro Villete =

Uruguayan footballer (born 1991)

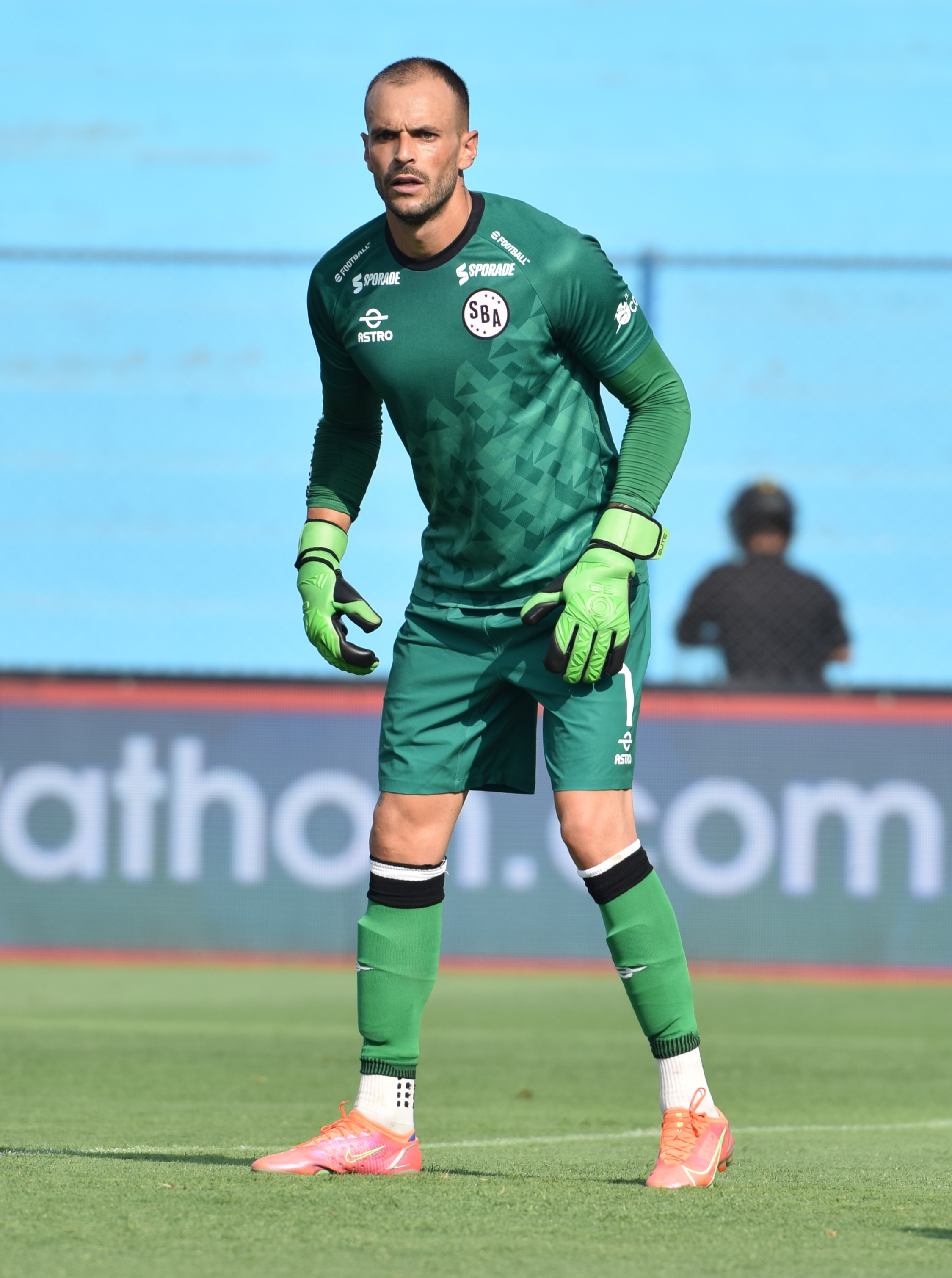
- 2023

Personal information
- Full name: Álvaro Villete
- Date of birth: 1 July 1991 (age 35)
- Place of birth: Minas, Uruguay
- Height: 1.88 m (6 ft 2 in)
- Position: Goalkeeper

Team information
- Current team: Comerciantes Unidos
- Number: 23

Senior career*
Years	Team	Apps	(Gls)
2012–2013	Cerro	5	(0)
2013–2016	Atenas	18	(0)
2015	→ Armenio (loan)	40	(0)
2016–2017	Progreso	12	(0)
2017	Patriotas	38	(0)
2018	Atenas	9	(0)
2019–2021	Patriotas	14	(0)
2020	→ Sabah (loan)	8	(0)
2023	Patriotas	32	(0)
2024	Metropolitanos	22	(0)
2025–	Comerciantes Unidos	32	(0)
- * Club domestic league appearances and goals as of 30 December 2025

Álvaro Villete is an Uruguayan football goalkeeper who plays for Comerciantes Unidos.

== Club career ==
On 21 September 2020, Sabah FC announced the signing of Villete on one-year long loan.
