= Amadou Diallo (footballer, born 1994) =

Guinean footballer (born 1994)

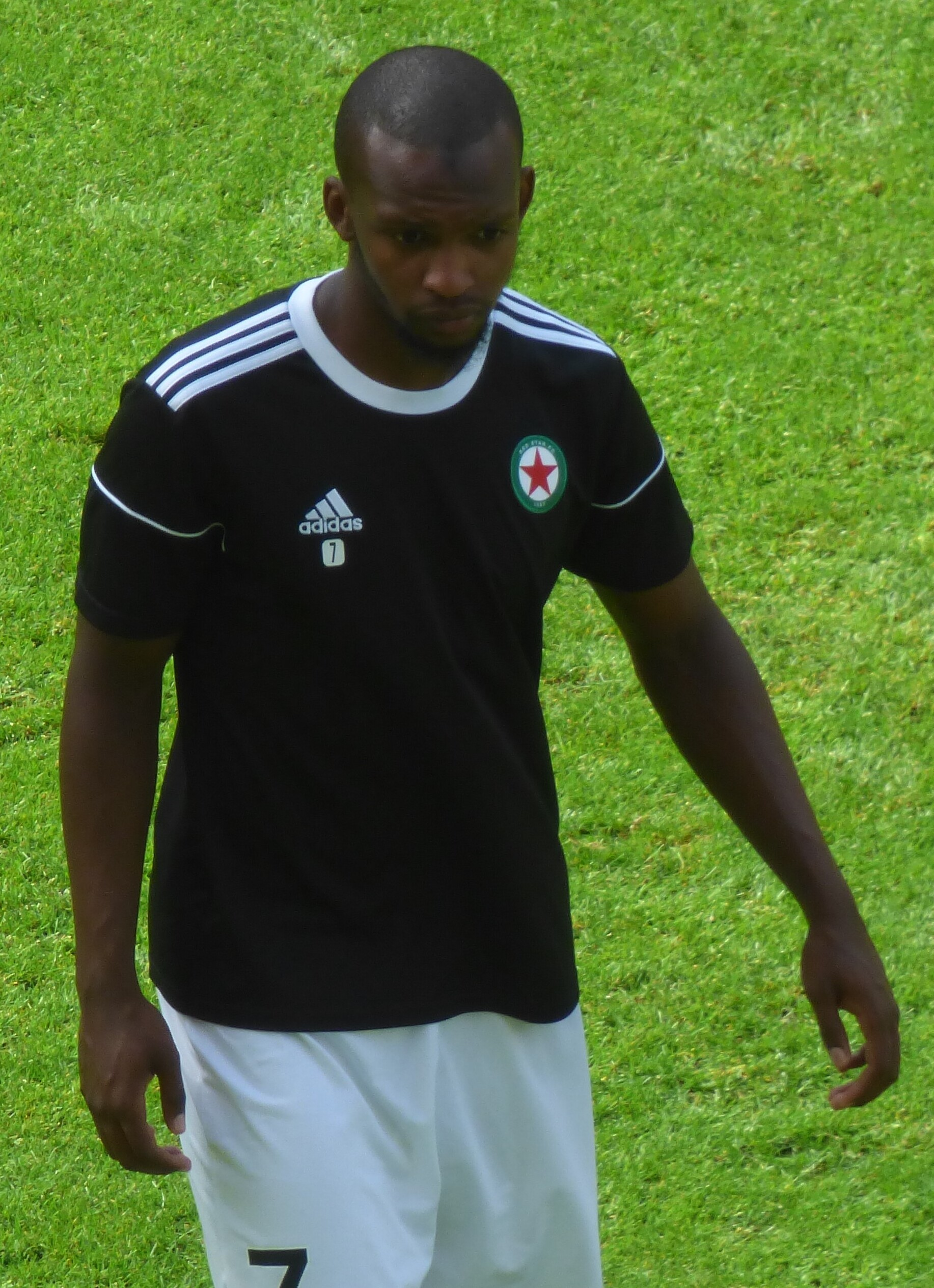
- Diallo in 2018

Personal information
- Full name: Amadou Tidiane Diallo
- Date of birth: 21 June 1994 (age 32)
- Place of birth: Paris, France
- Height: 1.79 m (5 ft 10 in)
- Positions: Striker; midfielder

Youth career
- INF Clairefontaine
- –2012: Monaco

Senior career*
Years	Team	Apps	(Gls)
2012–2013	Monaco B		
2013–2014	Union Namur		
2014–2016	RWS Bruxelles	33	(4)
2016–2018	Cercle Brugge	22	(0)
2018–2019	Red Star	38	(5)
2019–2021	Sabah	33	(4)
2021	Teplice	0	(0)
2022	Jerv	28	(3)
2023	Mioveni	12	(0)

International career
2016	Guinea U20	3	(0)
2016	Guinea U23	3	(0)
- * Club domestic league appearances and goals as of 14 May 2023

Amadou Tidiane Diallo (born 21 June 1994) is a professional footballer who plays as a midfielder. A dual French-Guinean national, Diallo has represented Guinea internationally.

== Club career ==
In January 2018, Diallo joined Championnat National side Red Star F.C. On 27 July 2018, the first matchday of the 2018–19 season, Diallo made his Ligue 2 debut with Red Star in a 2–1 home defeat to Niort.

On 27 June 2019, he joined Azerbaijan Premier League club Sabah on a two-year contract. After his contract with Sabah expired, he moved to Czech First League side Teplice in September 2021. On 13 January 2022, he signed a two-year contract with Norwegian Eliteserien club Jerv.

== International career ==
Diallo holds French and Guinean nationalities. He represented the Guinea U20 national team at the 2016 Toulon Tournament. He has also represented the Guinea U23 national team.

== Honours ==
RWS Bruxelles

- Belgian Second Division: 2015–16

Red Star

- Championnat National: 2017–18
