= Florijan Kadriu =

Macedonian footballer (born 1995)

Personal information
- Date of birth: 30 September 1995 (age 31)
- Place of birth: Kičevo, Macedonia
- Height: 1.69 m (5 ft 7 in)
- Position: Forward

Team information
- Current team: Bellinzona
- Number: 30

Youth career
- 2007–2015: Zajazi

Senior career*
Years	Team	Apps	(Gls)
2015–2016	Tirana	5	(0)
2016	→ Teuta (loan)	10	(0)
2016–2017	Shkupi	30	(0)
2017	Rabotnički	14	(0)
2018–2020	Renova	65	(4)
2020–2021	Sabail	18	(0)
2021–2022	Struga	25	(0)
2022–2023	Erzeni Shijak	32	(1)
2023	Atyrau	5	(0)
2024	Erzeni Shijak	14	(0)
2024–2025	Shkupi	29	(3)
2025	Rabotnicki	16	(3)
2026	Prishtina e Re	17	(0)
2026–	Bellinzona	2	(0)
- * Club domestic league appearances and goals as of 30 September 2026

Florijan Kadriu (born 30 September 1995) is a Macedonian professional footballer who plays as a forward for Bellinzona in Switzerland.

== Career ==
Kadriu was born in Kičevo.

=== Tirana ===
On 10 August 2015, Kadriu went to a trial with the most successful team of Albania, KF Tirana. Only two days later, he successfully passed the trial after making a superb performance in the friendly against Korabi Peshkopi, scoring in the 3–0 win. He was later awarded with a three-year contract.

One month later, on 12 September, Kadriu made his Albanian Superliga debut, playing the last 23 minutes of the goalless draw against the newcomers of Bylis Ballsh at Qemal Stafa Stadium, and four days later scored the winning goal against the underdogs of Erzeni in a match valid for the first leg of the first round of 2015–16 Albanian Cup.

==== Loan to Teuta ====
On 13 January 2016, Kadriu was loaned to fellow Albanian Superliga side Teuta Durrës until the end of the season in order to gain more experience.

=== Shkupi ===
On 3 August 2016, Kadriu was released by Tirana, which led him to join Macedonian First Football League side Shkupi on a free transfer, signing a one-year contract. He made his competitive debut four days later by playing as a substitute in a 1–1 draw against Vardar. A week later, Kadriu started for the first time in the 1–0 home defeat to Rabotnički, playing for 79 minutes.

=== Sabail ===
On 4 August 2020, Kadriu signed for Sabail FK on a contract until the end of the 2020–21 season. On 31 May 2021, Sabail announced that Kadriu had left the club.

== Career statistics ==
As of 3 January 2016

Appearances and goals by club, season and competition
Club	Season	League			Cup		Continental (Note: Including continental competitions, such as UEFA Champions League and UEFA Cup/Europa League)		Other (Note: Including other competitions, such as Albanian Supercup)		Total	
Club	Season	Division	Apps	Goals	Apps	Goals	Apps	Goals	Apps	Goals	Apps	Goals
Tirana	2015–16	Albanian Superliga	5	0	4	1	—		—		9	1
Teuta Durrës	2015–16	Albanian Superliga	10	0	1	0	—		—		11	0
Shkupi	2016–17	Macedonian First Football League	3	0	0	0	—		—		3	0
Career total			18	0	5	1	0	0	0	0	23	1
