= 2018–19 Zira FK season =

Zira
2018-19 season
- President: Vugar Astanov
- Manager: Aykhan Abbasov (until 29 August); Samir Abbasov (from 29 August)
- Stadium: Zira Olympic Sport Complex Stadium
- Premier League: 5th
- Azerbaijan Cup: Semifinal vs Sumgayit
- Top goalscorer: League: Julio Rodríguez (8); All: Julio Rodríguez (9)

The Zira FK 2017–18 season was Zira's fourth Azerbaijan Premier League season, and fifth season in their history.

== Season events ==
On 29 August, Aykhan Abbasov resigned as Zira's manager, with Samir Abbasov being appointed as his replacement the same day.

== Squad ==
As of match played 11 May 2019

No.	Name	Nationality	Position	Date of birth (age)	Signed from	Signed in	Contract ends	Apps.	Goals
Goalkeepers
1	Orkhan Sadigli	(Azerbaijan)	GK	19 March 1993 (aged 26)	Keşla	2019		2	0
62	Abdulla Seyidahmadov	(Azerbaijan)	GK	4 June 1997 (aged 21)	Trainee	2017		3	0
85	Kamal Bayramov	(Azerbaijan)	GK	19 August 1985 (aged 33)	AZAL	2015		46	0
Defenders
2	Ilkin Qirtimov	(Azerbaijan)	DF	4 November 1990 (aged 28)	Neftchi Baku	2018		27	1
13	Murad Musayev	(Azerbaijan)	DF	13 June 1994 (aged 24)	Shuvalan	2018		1	0
14	Bəxtiyar Həsənalızadə	(Azerbaijan)	DF	29 December 1992 (aged 26)	Sumgayit	2019	2020	14	0
16	Ibrahim Aslanli	(Azerbaijan)	DF	21 March 1997 (aged 22)	Qarabağ	2017	2020	6	0
26	Miloš Radivojević	(Serbia)	DF	5 April 1990 (aged 29)	Hapoel Ironi Kiryat Shmona	2018	2019	20	1
27	Adrian Scarlatache	(Romania)	DF	5 December 1986 (aged 32)	Keşla	2018	2019	23	0
39	Sadig Guliyev	(Azerbaijan)	DF	9 March 1995 (aged 24)	Gabala	2017		67	0
57	Kənan Zülfüqarov	(Azerbaijan)	DF	19 April 1999 (aged 20)	Trainee	2017		0	0
Midfielders
3	Budag Nasirov	(Azerbaijan)	MF	15 July 1996 (aged 22)	loan from Sporting B	2018	2019	12	0
4	Müşfiq İlyasov	(Azerbaijan)	MF	8 May 1996 (aged 23)	Youth team	2016		6	1
6	Vugar Mustafayev	(Azerbaijan)	MF	5 August 1994 (aged 24)	Qarabağ	2017		91	1
8	Kamal Mirzayev	(Azerbaijan)	MF	14 September 1994 (aged 24)	Sumgayit	2018		15	0
9	Alexandru Dedov	(Moldova)	MF	26 July 1989 (aged 29)	Milsami Orhei	2018		36	6
10	Sadio Tounkara	(Mali)	MF	27 April 1992 (aged 27)	AZAL	2017	2019	44	5
11	Dylan Duventru	(France)	MF	3 January 1989 (aged 30)	Alki Oroklini	2018	2019	24	1
23	Mpho Kgaswane	(Botswana)	MF	12 June 1994 (aged 24)	Baroka	2019	2019	13	4
38	Ilkin Muradov	(Azerbaijan)	MF	5 March 1996 (aged 23)	Trainee	2015		48	1
47	Əmrah Bayramov	(Azerbaijan)	MF	6 October 1998 (aged 20)	Trainee	2017		0	0
48	Chafik Tigroudja	(France)	MF	16 January 1992 (aged 27)	Kukësi	2019		8	1
77	Mirsahib Abbasov	(Azerbaijan)	MF	19 January 1993 (aged 26)	Keshla	2018		27	2
88	Tellur Mutallimov	(Azerbaijan)	MF	8 April 1995 (aged 24)	Gabala	2017	2020	39	3
91	Bilal Hamdi	(Algeria)	MF	1 May 1991 (aged 28)	Alki Oroklini	2018	2019	23	1
98	Agshin Guluzade	(Azerbaijan)	MF		Keşla	2018		0	0
99	Rafael Maharramli	(Azerbaijan)	MF	1 October 1999 (aged 19)	Qarabağ	2019		3	0
Forwards
7	Pardis Fardjad-Azad	(Azerbaijan)	FW	12 April 1988 (aged 31)	Keşla	2018		18	4
17	Robin Ngalande	(Malawi)	FW	2 November 1992 (aged 26)	Baroka	2019	2019	6	1
18	Julio Rodríguez	(Paraguay)	FW	5 December 1990 (aged 28)	Deportivo Capiatá	2019		14	9
20	Béko Fofana	(Ivory Coast)	FW	8 September 1988 (aged 30)	Vojvodina	2019		13	1
Left during the season
1	Anar Nazirov	(Azerbaijan)	GK	8 September 1985 (aged 33)	Gabala	2015		88	0
5	Adil Naghiyev	(Azerbaijan)	DF	11 September 1995 (aged 23)	AZAL	2015		105	8
17	Vusal Isgandarli	(Azerbaijan)	MF	3 November 1995 (aged 23)	Simurq	2015		69	8

== Transfers ==
=== In ===
Date	Position	Nationality	Name	From	Fee	Ref.
	DF	(Azerbaijan)	Ilkin Qirtimov	Neftchi Baku	Free	
	DF	(Azerbaijan)	Murad Musayev	Shuvalan	Undisclosed	
	MF	(Azerbaijan)	Mirsahib Abbasov	Keşla	Undisclosed	
	MF	(Azerbaijan)	Agshin Guluzade	Keşla	Undisclosed	
13 June 2018	MF	(Azerbaijan)	Kamal Mirzayev	Sumgayit	Undisclosed	
12 July 2018	MF	(France)	Dylan Duventru	Alki Oroklini	Undisclosed	
12 July 2018	MF	(Algeria)	Bilal Hamdi	Alki Oroklini	Undisclosed	
23 July 2018	FW	(Azerbaijan)	Pardis Fardjad-Azad	Keşla	Free	
2 August 2018	DF	(Serbia)	Miloš Radivojević	Hapoel Ironi Kiryat Shmona	Undisclosed	
4 September 2018	DF	(Romania)	Adrian Scarlatache	Keşla	Undisclosed	
27 December 2018	DF	(Azerbaijan)	Bəxtiyar Həsənalızadə	Sumgayit	Undisclosed	
	GK	(Azerbaijan)	Orkhan Sadigli	Keşla	Undisclosed	
26 January 2019	MF	(Botswana)	Mpho Kgaswane	Baroka	Undisclosed	
28 January 2019	FW	(Ivory Coast)	Béko Fofana	Vojvodina	Undisclosed	
28 January 2019	FW	(Paraguay)	Julio Rodríguez	Deportivo Capiatá	Undisclosed	
31 January 2019	FW	(Malawi)	Robin Ngalande	Baroka	Undisclosed	
11 February 2019	MF	(France)	Chafik Tigroudja	Kukësi	Undisclosed	
	MF	(Azerbaijan)	Rafael Maharramli	Qarabağ	Undisclosed	

=== Out ===
Date	Position	Nationality	Name	To	Fee	Ref.
27 December 2018	DF	(Azerbaijan)	Adil Naghiyev	Sumgayit	Undisclosed	
6 January 2019	GK	(Azerbaijan)	Anar Nazirov	Gabala	Undisclosed	
8 January 2019	MF	(Azerbaijan)	Vusal Isgandarli	Keşla	Undisclosed	

=== Loans in ===
Date from	Position	Nationality	Name	From	Date to	Ref.
10 August 2018	MF	(Azerbaijan)	Budag Nasirov	Sporting B	End of Season	

=== Released ===
Date	Position	Nationality	Name	Joined	Date
1 July 2018	DF	(Cameroon)	Joseph Boum		
16 May 2019	DF	(Azerbaijan)	Sadig Guliyev	Gabala	15 June 2019
16 May 2019	DF	(Serbia)	Miloš Radivojević	Slaven Belupo	
16 May 2019	MF	(Azerbaijan)	Tapdiq Ahmadov		
16 May 2019	MF	(Azerbaijan)	Agshin Guluzade		
16 May 2019	MF	(France)	Dylan Duventru	Sabail	15 June 2019
16 May 2019	MF	(Mali)	Sadio Tounkara	Narva Trans	27 February 2020
16 May 2019	MF	(Moldova)	Alexandru Dedov	Petrocub Hîncești	
16 May 2019	FW	(Azerbaijan)	Pardis Fardjad-Azad	Viktoria Berlin	
16 May 2019	FW	(Ivory Coast)	Béko Fofana	IMT Belgrade	

== Friendlies ==
8 September 2018	Gabala	0 – 2	Zira	Baku
AZT (UTC+4)		Report	Scarlatache 31'; Isgandarli 40'	Stadium: Azerbaijan State Academy of Physical Culture and Sports

15 January 2019	Zira (Azerbaijan)	v	(Kazakhstan) Taraz	Antalya, Turkey
AZST (UTC+4)
Note: match cancelled due to heavy rain in Antalya.

18 January 2019	Zira (Azerbaijan)	1 – 0	(Romania) Voluntari	Antalya, Turkey
AZST (UTC+4)	Fardjad-Azad 89' (pen.)	Report

22 January 2019	Zira (Azerbaijan)	1 – 0	(Hungary) Paks	Antalya, Turkey
AZST (UTC+4)	Qirtimov	Report

27 January 2019	Zira (Azerbaijan)	2 – 0	(Russia) Tambov	Antalya, Turkey
AZST (UTC+4)	Hamdi; Dedov	Report

== Competitions ==
=== Overview ===
Competition	First match	Last match	Starting round	Final position	Record							
Competition	First match	Last match	Starting round	Final position	Pld	W	D	L	GF	GA	GD	Win %
Premier League	18 August 2018	11 May 2019	Matchday 1	5th	28	8	7	13	30	40	−10	28.57
Azerbaijan Cup	15 December 2018	1 May 2019	Quarterfinal	Semifinal	4	2	2	0	7	5	+2	50.00
Total					32	10	9	13	37	45	−8	31.25

Last updated: 11 May 2019
Source: Competitions

=== Premier League ===
==== Results summary ====
Overall								Home						Away					
Pld	W	D	L	GF	GA	GD	Pts	W	D	L	GF	GA	GD	W	D	L	GF	GA	GD
28	8	7	13	30	40	−10	31	4	4	6	13	21	−8	4	3	7	17	19	−2

Last updated: 11 May 2019.
Source: See Results

==== Results ====
18 August 2018 2	Zira	2 – 2	Keşla	Baku
20:30 AZT (UTC+4)	Abbasov 2'; Fardjad-Azad (yellow card) 15' (goal) 35'; Muradov (yellow card) 55'; Nazirov (yellow card) 89'; Mustafayev (yellow card) 90'	Report	S.Alkhasov 53'; Clennon 90+1'	Stadium: AZAL Stadium; Attendance: 400; Referee: Ingilab Məmmədov

25 August 2018 3	Zira	0 – 2	Sabah	Baku
20:30 AZT (UTC+4)	Dedov (yellow card) 24'; Qirtimov (yellow card) 73'; Mustafayev (yellow card) 76'; Isgandarli (yellow card) 90'	Report	Dević 2', 30'; V.Abdullayev (yellow card) 69'; E.Turabov (yellow card) 78'	Stadium: Dalga Stadium; Attendance: 150; Referee: Orkhan Məmmədov

15 September 2018 4	Sabail	3 – 0	Zira	Baku
20:30 AZT (UTC+4)	Kitanovski (yellow card) 33'; Amirguliyev 84' (yellow card) 85'	Report	Isgandarli (yellow card) 29'; Tounkara (yellow card) 45+1'; Mustafayev (yellow card) 65'; Fardjad-Azad 68' (pen.) (yellow card) 80'	Stadium: Bayil Arena; Attendance: 500; Referee: Raad Ahmədov
Note: Sabail awarded a 3-0 win after Zira failed to register Huseyn Akhmedov on their bench as an U21 player.

22 September 2018 5	Zira	1 – 2	Neftchi Baku	Baku
20:30 AZT (UTC+4)	Duventru 33'; Qirtimov (yellow card) 71'; Mustafayev (yellow card) 73'	Report	Abbasov 6'; Mustivar (yellow card) 18'; Akhundov (yellow card) 27'; Paracki 52'; A.Krivotsyuk (yellow card) 83'	Stadium: Dalga Stadium; Attendance: 600; Referee: Rauf Jabbarov

26 September 2018 1	Qarabağ	3 – 2	Zira	Baku
20:00 AZT (UTC+4)	Ozobić 28' (pen.); Emeghara 48', 85'; Zoubir (yellow card) 73'	Report	Dedov (yellow card) 28'; Abbasov 56', 82'; Naghiyev (yellow card) 89'	Stadium: Azersun Arena; Attendance: 700; Referee: Ramil Diniyev

30 September 2018 6	Sumgayit	1 – 0	Zira	Baku
20:00 AZT (UTC+4)	Yildirim 16'; Dzhenetov (yellow card) 83'	Report	Tounkara (yellow card) 67'; Mirzayev (yellow card) 70'; Qirtimov (yellow card) 89'	Stadium: Bayil Arena; Attendance: 700; Referee: Vugar Həsənli

5 October 2018 7	Zira	1 – 0	Gabala	Baku
18:00 AZT (UTC+4)	Qirtimov (yellow card) 52'; Naghiyev (yellow card) 62'; Radivojević 86'	Report	Gurbanov (yellow card) 11'; Adeniyi (yellow card) 40'; G.Aliyev (yellow card) 90+1'	Stadium: Dalga Arena; Attendance: 400; Referee: Rauf Jabbarov

21 October 2018 8	Keşla	1 – 0	Zira	Baku
19:00 AZT (UTC+4)	Naghiyev 2' (o.g.); Yunanov (yellow card) 31'; Guidileye (yellow card) 68'	Report	Mirzayev (yellow card) 33'; Guliyev (yellow card) 65'; Naghiyev (yellow card) 89'; Hamdi (yellow card) 90+4'	Stadium: ASK Arena; Attendance: 500; Referee: Aliyar Ağayev

27 October 2018 9	Sabah	2 – 1	Zira	Masazır
17:00 AZT (UTC+4)	M.Isayev 45+1'; Wanderson (yellow card) 50'; Imamverdiyev 90+2'	Report	Muradov (yellow card) 21'; Fardjad-Azad (yellow card) 65'; Mutallimov 73'	Stadium: Alinja Arena; Attendance: 1,000; Referee: Vugar Həsənli

4 November 2018 10	Zira	0 – 0	Sabail	Baku
19:00 AZT (UTC+4)	Muradov (yellow card) 79'	Report	Rahimov (yellow card) 53' (yellow-red card) 60'; Jarjué (yellow card) 56'; E.Balayev (yellow card) 85'	Stadium: Bakcell Arena; Attendance: 300; Referee: Rahim Həsənov

10 November 2018 11	Neftchi Baku	2 – 2	Zira	Baku
19:30 AZT (UTC+4)	Dabo 36'; Paracki (yellow card) 62'; Mustivar (yellow card) 66'; Abbasov (yellow card) 69' (goal) 80'; Bralić (yellow card) 90'	Report	Mirzayev (yellow card) 12'; Mutallimov (yellow card) 30' (goal) 76'; Qirtimov (yellow card) 61'; Isgandarli 83'; Abbasov (yellow card) 90'	Stadium: Bakcell Arena; Attendance: 2,500; Referee: Ingilab Məmmədov

25 November 2018 12	Zira	3 – 1	Sumgayit	Baku
19:00 AZT (UTC+4)	Dedov 36', 74'; Qirtimov (yellow card) 52'; Naghiyev (yellow card) 60'; Hamdi 90+6'	Report	Həsənalızadə (yellow card) 13'; Ismayilov 45+3'; S.Aliyev (yellow card) 74'	Stadium: Dalga Arena; Attendance: 200; Referee: Sabuhi Bayramov

2 December 2018 13	Gabala	0 – 0	Zira	Qabala
17:00 AZST (UTC+4)	Abbasov (yellow card) 47'; Khalilzade (yellow card) 52'; E.Jamalov (yellow card) 54'; Huseynov (yellow card) 90'	Report	Fardjad-Azad (yellow card) 15'; Hamdi (yellow card) 39' (yellow-red card) 61'; Muradov (yellow card) 38'; Mirzayev (yellow card) 61'	Stadium: Gabala City Stadium; Attendance: 250; Referee: Vugar Həsənli
Note: Match postponed in the 58th minute due to fog, with the remaining minutes being played on 3 December 2018 from 13:00.

9 December 2018 14	Zira	0 – 6	Qarabağ	Baku
17:00 AZT (UTC+4)	Qirtimov (yellow card) 54'; Nasirov (yellow card) 56'; Radivojević (yellow card) 88'	Report	Garayev (yellow card) 12'; Quintana 29', 34', 57'; Madatov 42'; Míchel 82'; Qirtimov 90+2'	Stadium: Dalga Arena; Attendance: 400; Referee: Aliyar Ağayev

2 February 2019 15	Zira	0 – 2	Sabah	Zirə
16:30 AZT (UTC+4)	Qirtimov (yellow card) 44'; Həsənalızadə (yellow card) 47'; Hamdi (yellow card) 47'; Muradov (yellow card) 38'; Mustafayev (red card) 62'	Report	M.Isayev (yellow card) 18' (yellow-red card) 25'; Ramos (yellow card) 18'; Dević 47' (pen.); Khalilzade (yellow card) 48'; Eyyubov 68' (yellow card) 85'; Imamverdiyev (yellow card) 74'	Stadium: Zira Olympic Sport Complex Stadium; Attendance: 200; Referee: Rauf Jabbarov

10 February 2019 16	Sabail	0 – 2	Zira	Baku
16:30 AZT (UTC+4)	Yunuszade (yellow card) 61' (yellow-red card) 81'; A.Gurbanli (yellow card) 83'; Jarjué (yellow card) 88'	Report	Rodríguez 2'; Hamdi (yellow card) 68'; Dedov (yellow card) 90+1'; Tounkara 90+5'	Stadium: Bayil Arena; Attendance: 300; Referee: Aliyar Ağayev

16 February 2019 17	Zira	0 – 0	Neftchi Baku	Zirə
17:30 AZT (UTC+4)	Radivojević (yellow card) 45+1'; Həsənalızadə (yellow card) 53'; Bayramov (yellow card) 87'	Report	Petrov (yellow card) 80'	Stadium: Zira Olympic Sport Complex Stadium; Attendance: 1,200; Referee: Səbuhi Bayramov

24 February 2019 18	Sumgayit	0 – 1	Zira	Baku
18:30 AZT (UTC+4)	Naghiyev (yellow card) 83'; E.Babayev (yellow card) 90+4'	Report	Kgaswane 23'	Stadium: Bayil Arena; Attendance: 1,500; Referee: Aliyar Ağayev

3 March 2019 19	Zira	1 – 1	Gabala	Zirə
15:00 AZST (UTC+4)	Fofana 87' (yellow card) 90+3'	Report	J.Huseynov (yellow card) 20'; Həsənalızadə 57' (o.g.); Ramaldanov (yellow card) 70'	Stadium: Zira Olympic Sport Complex Stadium; Attendance: 600; Referee: Ingilab Məmmədov

9 March 2019 20	Qarabağ	0 – 0	Zira	Baku
18:30 AZT (UTC+4)	Madatov (yellow card) 84'	Report	Mutallimov (yellow card) 56'; Nasirov (yellow card) 83'	Stadium: Tofiq Bahramov Republican Stadium; Attendance: 700; Referee: Rauf Jabbarov

15 March 2019 21	Zira	2 – 0	Keşla	Zirə
16:00 AZT (UTC+4)	Dedov (yellow card) 44'; Tounkara (yellow card) 53'; J.Amirli 69' (o.g.); Rodríguez (yellow card) 76' (goal) 79'; Duventru (yellow card) 84'	Report	S.Alkhasov (yellow card) 61'	Stadium: Zira Olympic Sport Complex Stadium; Attendance: 400; Referee: Rəvan Həmzəzadə

30 March 2019 22	Zira	1 – 2	Sabail	Zirə
16:00 AZT (UTC+4)	Scarlatache (yellow card) 24'; Rodríguez (yellow card) 57' (goal) 69'; Bayramov (yellow card) 71'	Report	Rahimov (yellow card) 28' (goal) 90+4'; Ramazanov 41'; Yunuszade (yellow card) 74'; Martinov (yellow card) 78'; F.Muradbayli (yellow card) 89'	Stadium: Zira Olympic Sport Complex Stadium; Attendance: 400; Referee: Vugar Həsənli

6 April 2019 23	Neftchi Baku	4 – 2	Zira	Baku
18:00 AZT (UTC+4)	Mbodj (yellow card) 18'; Dabo 40', 88' (yellow card) 90+3'; Krivotsyuk 44' (yellow card) 90'; Alaskarov (yellow card) 61'; Mahmudov (yellow card) 90'	Report	Kgaswane 59', 80' (pen.); Muradov (yellow card) 62' (yellow-red card) 90'; Qirtimov (yellow card) 66'; Scarlatache (yellow card) 87'; Həsənalızadə (yellow card) 90'; Sadigli (red card) 90+3'	Stadium: Bakcell Arena; Attendance: 1,100; Referee: Ingilab Məmmədov

13 April 2019 24	Zira	2 – 0	Sumgayit	Zirə
16:00 AZT (UTC+4)	Rodríguez 33'; Mutallimov (yellow card) 74'; Qirtimov 90+2'	Report	Babayev (yellow card) 38'; Hüseynov (yellow card) 42'	Stadium: Zira Olympic Sport Complex Stadium; Attendance: 500; Referee: Aliyar Ağayev

19 April 2019 24	Gabala	2 – 1	Zira	Qabala
16:00 AZT (UTC+4)	Volkovi 20' (yellow card) 87'; Adeniyi 56'; E.Jamalov (yellow card) 62'; Mammadov (yellow card) 67'	Report	Fardjad-Azad (yellow card) 12'; Mirzayev (yellow card) 14'; Tounkara 71'; Həsənalızadə (yellow card) 74'	Stadium: Gabala City Stadium; Attendance: 300; Referee: Ingilab Məmmədov

27 April 2019 25	Zira	0 – 3	Qarabağ	Zirə
16:30 AZT (UTC+4)	Həsənalızadə (yellow card) 49'; Musayev (yellow card) 52'; Kgaswane (yellow card) 65'; Mustafayev (yellow card) 69'	Report	Quintana 21'; Ozobić 28'; Slavchev (yellow card) 72'; Zoubir (yellow card) 73'; Madatov 79'	Stadium: Zira Olympic Sport Complex Stadium; Attendance: 600; Referee: Sabuhi Bayramov

5 May 2019 27	Keşla	1 – 3	Zira	Baku
17:00 AZT (UTC+4)	Girdvainis (yellow card) 13'; Denis (red card) 28'; Ayité 45+1' (pen.); Mitrović (yellow card) 56'; Clennon (yellow card) 80'	Report	Kgaswane (yellow card) 9' (goal) 52'; Hamdi (yellow card) 16'; Rodríguez 26', 47'	Stadium: ASK Arena; Attendance: 200; Referee: Ingilab Məmmədov

11 May 2019 28	Sabah	0 – 3	Zira	Masazır
16:00 AZT (UTC+4)	Z.Mərdanov (yellow card) 20'; E.Nabiyev (yellow card) 55'	Report	Kgaswane (yellow card) 12'; Rodríguez 38', 81'; Tigroudja (yellow card) 41'; Scarlatache (yellow card) 50'; Ngalande 69'	Stadium: Alinja Arena; Attendance: 500; Referee: Aliyar Ağayev

==== League table ====
Pos	Team	Pld	W	D	L	GF	GA	GD	Pts	Qualification or relegation
3	Sabail	28	12	5	11	34	37	−3	41	Qualification for the Europa League first qualifying round
4	Gabala	28	9	9	10	31	33	−2	36	Qualification for the Europa League second qualifying round
5	Zira	28	8	7	13	30	40	−10	31	
6	Sumgayit	28	8	5	15	24	42	−18	29	
7	Sabah	28	7	6	15	20	41	−21	27	

Source: Soccerway
Rules for classification: 1) Points; 2) Head-to-head points; 3) Head-to-head goal difference; 4) Head-to-head goals scored; 5) Head-to-head away goals scored (only if two teams); 6) Goal difference; 7) Goals scored.

=== Azerbaijan Cup ===
15 December 2018 Quarterfinal 1st leg	Zira	1 – 0	Sabail	Baku
17:00 AZT (UTC+4)	Dedov (yellow card) 16'; Muradov 45'; Scarlatache (yellow card) 49'	Report	Kitanovski (red card) 33'; Jarjué (yellow card) 59'; Gurbanov (yellow card) 65'; Cociuc (yellow card) 86'	Stadium: Dalga Arena; Attendance: 200; Referee: Alik Yunusov

19 December 2018 Quarterfinal 2nd leg	Sabail	2 – 3 (2 – 4 agg.)	Zira	Baku
19:00 AZT (UTC+4)	Scarlatache 3' (o.g.); Rahimov (yellow card) 71'; Gurbanov 83'; A.Gurbanli (yellow card) 90+3'	Report	Naghiyev 45+2', 74' (yellow card) 74'; Tounkara (yellow card) 47'; Fardjad-Azad 63' (yellow card) 90+2'	Stadium: Bayil Arena; Attendance: 350; Referee: Ravan Həmzəzadə

23 April 2019 Semifinal 1st leg	Sumgayit	0 – 0	Zira	Sumqayit
18:30 AZT (UTC+4)	Mammadov (yellow card) 32'	Report	Rodríguez (yellow card) 25'; Tounkara (yellow card) 46'	Stadium: Kapital Bank Arena; Attendance: 1,100; Referee: Sabuhi Bayramov

1 May 2019 Semifinal 2nd leg	Zira	3 – 3 (3 – 3 a agg.)	Sumgayit	Baku
20:00 AZT (UTC+4)	Muradov (yellow card) 28'; Fardjad-Azad 47'; Scarlatache (yellow card) 78'; Rodríguez 84'; Hamdi (yellow card) 90+1'; Tigroudja 90+4'	Report	Hüseynov (yellow card) 7'; Babaei 20', 28', 45'; Isayev (yellow card) 74'; Jannatov (yellow card) 89'	Stadium: Dalga Arena; Attendance: 1,000; Referee: Aliyar Ağayev

== Squad statistics ==
As of match played 11 May 2018

=== Appearances and goals ===
No.	Pos	Nat	Player	Total		Premier League		Azerbaijan Cup	
No.	Pos	Nat	Player	Apps	Goals	Apps	Goals	Apps	Goals
1	GK	(Azerbaijan) AZE	Orkhan Sadigli	2	0	2	0	0	0
2	DF	(Azerbaijan) AZE	Ilkin Qirtimov	27	1	22+1	1	4	0
3	MF	(Azerbaijan) AZE	Budag Nasirov	12	0	7+5	0	0	0
6	MF	(Azerbaijan) AZE	Vugar Mustafayev	15	0	12+2	0	0+1	0
7	FW	(Azerbaijan) AZE	Pardis Fardjad-Azad	18	4	13+1	2	2+2	2
8	MF	(Azerbaijan) AZE	Kamal Mirzayev	15	0	10+3	0	0+2	0
9	MF	(Moldova) MDA	Alexandru Dedov	25	2	17+5	2	2+1	0
10	MF	(Mali) MLI	Sadio Tounkara	25	2	13+9	2	2+1	0
11	MF	(France) FRA	Dylan Duventru	24	1	19+1	1	4	0
13	DF	(Azerbaijan) AZE	Murad Musayev	1	0	1	0	0	0
14	DF	(Azerbaijan) AZE	Bəxtiyar Həsənalızadə	13	0	11	0	2	0
16	DF	(Azerbaijan) AZE	Ibrahim Aslanli	2	0	2	0	0	0
17	FW	(Malawi) MAW	Robin Ngalande	6	1	2+4	1	0	0
18	FW	(Paraguay) PAR	Julio Rodríguez	14	9	7+5	8	2	1
20	FW	(Ivory Coast) CIV	Béko Fofana	13	1	4+7	1	2	0
23	MF	(Botswana) BOT	Mpho Kgaswane	13	4	8+3	4	2	0
26	DF	(Serbia) SRB	Miloš Radivojević	21	1	18+1	1	2	0
27	DF	(Romania) ROU	Adrian Scarlatache	23	0	19	0	4	0
38	MF	(Azerbaijan) AZE	Ilkin Muradov	27	1	20+3	0	4	1
39	DF	(Azerbaijan) AZE	Sadig Guliyev	6	0	6	0	0	0
48	MF	(France) FRA	Chafik Tigroudja	7	1	3+2	0	2	1
62	GK	(Azerbaijan) AZE	Abdulla Seyidahmadov	2	0	2	0	0	0
77	MF	(Azerbaijan) AZE	Mirsahib Abbasov	19	3	7+11	3	0+1	0
85	GK	(Azerbaijan) AZE	Kamal Bayramov	15	0	10+1	0	4	0
88	MF	(Azerbaijan) AZE	Tellur Mutallimov	28	2	22+2	2	4	0
91	MF	(Algeria) ALG	Bilal Hamdi	23	1	16+4	1	2+1	0
99	MF	(Azerbaijan) AZE	Rafael Maharramli	3	0	1+2	0	0	0
Players away from Zira on loan:
Players who left Zira during the season:
1	GK	(Azerbaijan) AZE	Anar Nazirov	14	0	14	0	0	0
5	DF	(Azerbaijan) AZE	Adil Naghiyev	14	2	13	0	0+1	2
17	MF	(Azerbaijan) AZE	Vusal Isgandarli	13	0	5+6	0	0+2	0

=== Goal scorers ===
Place	Position	Nation	Number	Name	Premier League	Azerbaijan Cup	Total
1	FW	(Paraguay)	18	Julio Rodríguez	8	1	9
2	MF	(Botswana)	23	Mpho Kgaswane	4	0	4
2	FW	(Azerbaijan)	7	Pardis Fardjad-Azad	2	2	4
4	MF	(Azerbaijan)	77	Mirsahib Abbasov	3	0	3
5	MF	(Azerbaijan)	88	Tellur Mutallimov	2	0	2
5	MF	(Moldova)	9	Alexandru Dedov	2	0	2
5	MF	(Mali)	10	Sadio Tounkara	2	0	2
5	DF	(Azerbaijan)	5	Adil Naghiyev	0	2	2
9	MF	(France)	11	Dylan Duventru	1	0	1
9	DF	(Serbia)	26	Miloš Radivojević	1	0	1
9	MF	(Algeria)	91	Bilal Hamdi	1	0	1
9	FW	(Ivory Coast)	20	Béko Fofana	1	0	1
9	DF	(Azerbaijan)	2	Ilkin Qirtimov	1	0	1
9	FW	(Malawi)	17	Robin Ngalande	1	0	1
9	MF	(Azerbaijan)	38	Ilkin Muradov	0	1	1
9	MF	(France)	48	Chafik Tigroudja	0	1	1
9				Own goal	1	0	1
				TOTALS	30	7	37

=== Disciplinary record ===
Number	Nation	Position	Name	Premier League		Azerbaijan Cup		Total	
Number	Nation	Position	Name	Yellow card	Red card	Yellow card	Red card	Yellow card	Red card
1	(Azerbaijan)	GK	Orkhan Sadigli	0	1	0	0	0	1
2	(Azerbaijan)	DF	Ilkin Qirtimov	9	0	0	0	9	0
3	(Azerbaijan)	MF	Budag Nasirov	2	0	0	0	2	0
6	(Azerbaijan)	MF	Vugar Mustafayev	5	1	0	0	5	1
7	(Azerbaijan)	FW	Pardis Fardjad-Azad	5	0	1	0	6	0
8	(Azerbaijan)	MF	Kamal Mirzayev	5	0	0	0	5	0
9	(Moldova)	MF	Alexandru Dedov	4	0	1	0	5	0
10	(Mali)	MF	Sadio Tounkara	3	0	2	0	5	0
11	(France)	MF	Dylan Duventru	1	0	0	0	1	0
13	(Azerbaijan)	DF	Murad Musayev	1	0	0	0	1	0
14	(Azerbaijan)	DF	Bəxtiyar Həsənalızadə	5	0	0	0	5	0
18	(Paraguay)	FW	Julio Rodríguez	2	0	1	0	3	0
20	(Ivory Coast)	FW	Béko Fofana	1	0	0	0	1	0
23	(Botswana)	MF	Mpho Kgaswane	3	0	0	0	3	0
26	(Serbia)	DF	Miloš Radivojević	2	0	0	0	2	0
27	(Romania)	DF	Adrian Scarlatache	3	0	2	0	5	0
38	(Azerbaijan)	MF	Ilkin Muradov	7	1	1	0	8	1
39	(Azerbaijan)	DF	Sadig Guliyev	1	0	0	0	1	0
48	(France)	MF	Chafik Tigroudja	1	0	0	0	1	0
77	(Azerbaijan)	MF	Mirsahib Abbasov	1	0	0	0	1	0
85	(Azerbaijan)	GK	Kamal Bayramov	2	0	0	0	2	0
88	(Azerbaijan)	MF	Tellur Mutallimov	3	0	0	0	3	0
91	(Algeria)	MF	Bilal Hamdi	6	1	1	0	7	1
Players who left Zira during the season:
1	(Azerbaijan)	GK	Anar Nazirov	1	0	0	0	1	0
5	(Azerbaijan)	DF	Adil Naghiyev	4	0	1	0	5	0
17	(Azerbaijan)	MF	Vusal Isgandarli	2	0	0	0	2	0
			TOTALS	79	4	10	0	89	4
