= 2019–20 Sabail FK season =

Sabail
2019-20 season
- Manager: Aftandil Hajiyev
- Stadium: Bayil Stadium
- Premier League: 7th
- Azerbaijan Cup: Quarterfinal vs Zira
- Europa League: First qualifying round vs Universitatea Craiova
- Top goalscorer: League: Two Players (3); All: Aghabala Ramazanov (6)
Home colours	Away colours

The Sabail FK 2019–20 season was Sabail's third Azerbaijan Premier League season, and their fourth season in existence. After finishing the previous season in third place, Sabail qualified for the UEFA Europa League for the first time, entering at the first qualifying round stage with a tie against CS Universitatea Craiova. Sabail will also take part in the Azerbaijan Premier League and in the Azerbaijan Cup.

== Season events ==
On 13 March 2020, the Azerbaijan Premier League was postponed due to the COVID-19 pandemic.

On 19 June 2020, the AFFA announced that the 2019–20 season had been officially ended without the resumption of the remains matches due to the escalating situation of the COVID-19 pandemic in Azerbaijan.

== Squad ==
As of match played 8 March 2020

No.	Name	Nationality	Position	Date of birth (age)	Signed from	Signed in	Contract ends	Apps.	Goals
Goalkeepers
1	Oleksandr Rybka	(Ukraine)	GK	10 April 1987 (aged 33)	Afjet Afyonspor	2019		22	0
25	Elkhan Ahmadov	(Azerbaijan)	GK	2 July 1993 (aged 26)	Mil-Muğan	2017		10	0
29	Shahin Zakiyev	(Azerbaijan)	GK	11 June 1999 (age 27)	Keşla	2020		0	0
85	Kamal Bayramov	(Azerbaijan)	GK	19 August 1985 (aged 34)	Zira	2019		11	0
Defenders
3	Turan Manafov	(Azerbaijan)	DF	19 September 1998 (aged 21)	Zagatala	2019		16	0
4	Eltun Yagublu	(Azerbaijan)	DF	19 August 1991 (aged 28)	Neftchi Baku	2017		38	1
13	Shahriyar Rahimov	(Azerbaijan)	DF	6 April 1989 (aged 31)	Kapaz	2018		50	2
16	Peyman Keshavarz	(Iran)	DF	3 March 1996 (aged 24)		2020		2	0
21	Erico	(Brazil)	DF	20 July 1989 (aged 30)	Astra Giurgiu	2019		12	1
26	Kamal Gurbanov	(Azerbaijan)	DF	6 May 1994 (aged 26)	Neftchi Baku	2017		35	0
34	Urfan Abbasov	(Azerbaijan)	DF	14 October 1992 (aged 27)	Gabala	2019		24	0
55	Adil Naghiyev	(Azerbaijan)	DF	11 September 1995 (aged 24)	Sumgayit	2019		17	0
	Murad Gayali	(Azerbaijan)	DF	9 March 1999 (aged 21)	Keşla	2020	2022	0	0
Midfielders
5	Vugar Beybalayev	(Azerbaijan)	MF	5 August 1993 (aged 26)	Sumgayit	2018		26	0
7	Fahmin Muradbayli	(Azerbaijan)	MF	16 March 1996 (aged 24)	loan from Neftchi Baku	2017		61	6
8	Lema Mabidi	(Democratic Republic of the Congo)	MF	11 June 1993 (aged 27)	Raja Casablanca	2020	2020	2	0
9	Mirsahib Abbasov	(Azerbaijan)	MF	19 January 1993 (aged 27)	Zira	2019		16	1
10	Michael Essien	(Ghana)	MF	3 December 1982 (aged 37)		2019	2020	15	0
14	Rahid Amirguliyev	(Azerbaijan)	MF	1 September 1989 (aged 30)	Qarabağ	2018		52	0
17	Elchin Rahimli	(Azerbaijan)	MF	17 June 1996 (aged 24)	Qarabağ	2018		17	0
18	Agshin Gurbanli	(Azerbaijan)	MF	15 July 1996 (aged 23)	Neftchi Baku	2018		29	2
19	Ruslan Hajiyev	(Azerbaijan)	MF	20 March 1998 (aged 22)	loan from Qarabağ	2018		9	0
27	Hendrick Ekstein	(South Africa)	MF	1 January 1991 (aged 29)	Sabah	2020		6	2
77	Adilkhan Garahmadov	(Azerbaijan)	MF	5 June 2001 (aged 19)	Academy	2018		16	1
79	Ali Sadixov	(Azerbaijan)	MF	13 August 1999 (aged 20)	Gabala	2019		8	0
88	Orxan Gurbanli	(Azerbaijan)	MF	12 July 1995 (aged 24)	Neftchi Baku	2018		15	1
97	Bahadur Haziyev	(Azerbaijan)	MF	26 March 1999 (aged 21)	MOIK Baku	2020		1	0
Forwards
11	Rauf Aliyev	(Azerbaijan)	FW	12 February 1989 (aged 31)	Neftçi	2020	2020	5	3
Left during the season
8	Eugeniu Cociuc	(Moldova)	MF	11 May 1993 (aged 27)	MŠK Žilina	2018		54	6
10	Aghabala Ramazanov	(Azerbaijan)	FW	20 January 1993 (aged 27)	Qarabağ	2018		40	14
11	Dylan Duventru	(France)	MF	3 January 1989 (aged 31)	Zira	2019		2	1
12	Daniel Bozhinovski	(North Macedonia)	GK	8 July 1989 (aged 30)	Rabotnički	2019		2	0
16	Ihor Korotetskyi	(Ukraine)	DF	13 September 1987 (aged 32)	Kapaz	2018		7	0
22	Mirabdulla Abbasov	(Azerbaijan)	FW	27 April 1995 (aged 25)	loan from Neftçi	2019		13	3
32	Elvin Yunuszade	(Azerbaijan)	DF	22 August 1992 (aged 27)	Sabah	2019		25	2
91	Bilal Hamdi	(Algeria)	MF	1 May 1991 (aged 29)	Zira	2019		2	0

== Transfers ==
=== In ===
Date	Position	Nationality	Name	From	Fee	Ref.
Summer 2019	MF	(Azerbaijan)	Mirsahib Abbasov	Zira	Undisclosed	
Summer 2019	MF	(Azerbaijan)	Ali Sadixov	Gabala	Undisclosed	
22 May 2019	GK	(Azerbaijan)	Kamal Bayramov	Zira	Undisclosed	
4 June 2019	DF	(Azerbaijan)	Urfan Abbasov	Gabala	Undisclosed	
8 June 2019	DF	(Azerbaijan)	Turan Manafov	Zagatala	Undisclosed	
15 June 2019	GK	(North Macedonia)	Daniel Bozhinovski	Rabotnički	Undisclosed	
15 June 2019	MF	(France)	Dylan Duventru	Zira	Undisclosed	
23 June 2019	MF	(Algeria)	Bilal Hamdi	Zira	Undisclosed	
26 June 2019	DF	(Brazil)	Erico	Astra Giurgiu	Undisclosed	
9 August 2019	DF	(Azerbaijan)	Adil Naghiyev	Sumgayit	Undisclosed	
10 January 2020	DF	(Azerbaijan)	Murad Gayali	Keşla	Undisclosed	
11 January 2020	FW	(Azerbaijan)	Rauf Aliyev	Neftçi	Free	
21 January 2020	MF	(South Africa)	Hendrick Ekstein	Sabah	Free	
22 January 2020	DF	(Iran)	Peyman Keshavarz		Free	
12 February 2020	MF	(Democratic Republic of the Congo)	Lema Mabidi	Raja Casablanca	Free	
Winter 2020	GK	(Azerbaijan)	Shahin Zakiyev	Keşla	Undisclosed	
Winter 2020	MF	(Azerbaijan)	Bahadur Haziyev	MOIK Baku	Undisclosed	

=== Loans in ===
Date from	Position	Nationality	Name	From	Date to	Ref.
Summer 2018	MF	(Azerbaijan)	Ruslan Hajiyev	Qarabağ	End of Season	
20 June 2019	FW	(Azerbaijan)	Mirabdulla Abbasov	Sabail	January 2020	

=== Out ===
Date	Position	Nationality	Name	To	Fee	Ref.
7 June 2019	FW	(Republic of the Congo)	Kévin Koubemba	Sabah	Undisclosed	

=== Trial ===
Date from	Date to	Position	Nationality	Name	Last club	Ref.
January 2020		DF	(Iran)	Peyman Keshavarz	Sumgayit	
January 2020			(Iran)	Yusif Sayedi		
January 2020				Makat		
January 2020			(Azerbaijan)	Rafal Agayev		
January 2020			(Azerbaijan)	Orkhan Aliyev	Sumgayit	
January 2020		DF	(Curaçao)	Doriano Kortstam	Platanias	
January 2020		DF	(Guinea)	Fousseni Bamba	Budapest Honvéd	

=== Released ===
Date	Position	Nationality	Name	Joined	Date
18 June 2019	DF	(Guinea-Bissau)	Maudo Jarjué	Austria Wien	18 June 2019
7 August 2019	MF	(France)	Dylan Duventru	Olympiakos Nicosia	
8 August 2019	MF	(Algeria)	Bilal Hamdi	Olympiakos Nicosia	
31 August 2019	GK	(North Macedonia)	Daniel Bozhinovski	Sileks	12 September 2019
21 December 2019	DF	(Azerbaijan)	Elvin Yunuszade	Čelik Zenica	9 February 2020
23 December 2019	FW	(Azerbaijan)	Aghabala Ramazanov	Zira	1 January 2020
14 January 2020	DF	(Ukraine)	Ihor Korotetskyi		
15 January 2020	MF	(Moldova)	Eugeniu Cociuc	Sabah	28 January 2020

== Friendlies ==
21 June 2019	Lokomotiv Plovdiv (Bulgaria)	1 – 0	(Azerbaijan) Sabail	Bansko, Bulgaria
AZT (UTC+4)	Goal	Report

25 June 2019	Beroe Stara Zagora (Bulgaria)	4 – 0	(Azerbaijan) Sabail	Bansko, Bulgaria
AZT (UTC+4)	Goal	Report

28 June 2019	Academica Clinceni (Romania)	0 – 0	(Azerbaijan) Sabail	Bansko, Bulgaria
AZT (UTC+4)		Report

1 July 2019	Makedonija Gjorče Petrov (North Macedonia)	1 – 0	(Azerbaijan) Sabail	Bansko, Bulgaria
AZT (UTC+4)	Goal	Report

16 November 2019	Sabail	2 – 3	Gabala	Baku
AZT (UTC+4)	Erico 15'; Yagublu 56' (pen.)	Report	Mammadov 41'; S.Guliyev 43'; S.Maharramli 70'	Stadium: ASCO Arena

15 January 2020	Sabail (Azerbaijan)	0 – 1	(Kazakhstan) Zhetysu	Belek, Turkey
AZT (UTC+4)		Report

18 January 2020	Sabail (Azerbaijan)	1 – 3	(Ukraine) Olimpik Donetsk	Belek, Turkey
AZT (UTC+4)	Essien 68' (pen.)	Report	Zahedi 27'; Balashov 30'; Balanyuk 75'

21 January 2020	Sabail (Azerbaijan)	2 – 2	(Romania) Voluntari	Belek, Turkey
AZT (UTC+4)	Hajiyev 21'; Mirs.Abbasov 90'	Report	Goal

25 January 2020	Sabail (Azerbaijan)	1 – 0	(Poland) Korona Kielce	Belek, Turkey
16:00 AZT (UTC+4)	Ekstein 89'	Report

10 June 2020	Zira	2 – 2	Sabail	Zirə
AZST (UTC+4)	Ramazanov 16'; Kgaswane 70'	Report	Essien 30'; Manafov 49'	Stadium: Zira Olympic Sport Complex Stadium

== Competitions ==
=== Overview ===
Competition	First match	Last match	Starting round	Final position	Record							
Competition	First match	Last match	Starting round	Final position	Pld	W	D	L	GF	GA	GD	Win %
Premier League	18 August 2019	8 March 2020	Matchday 1	7th	20	5	5	10	16	30	−14	25.00
Azerbaijan Cup	15 December 2019	19 December 2019	Quarterfinal	Quarterfinal	2	0	1	1	0	1	−1	0.00
Total					22	5	6	11	16	31	−15	22.73

Last updated: 8 March 2020
Source: Competitions

=== Premier League ===
==== Results summary ====
Overall								Home						Away					
Pld	W	D	L	GF	GA	GD	Pts	W	D	L	GF	GA	GD	W	D	L	GF	GA	GD
20	5	5	10	16	30	−14	20	2	3	5	7	15	−8	3	2	5	9	15	−6

Last updated: 8 March 2020.
Source: See Results

==== Results by round ====
Round	1	2	3	4	5	6	7	8	9	10	11	12	13	14	15	16	17	18	19	20
Ground	H	A	H	A	H	A	A	H	A	H	A	H	H	A	H	A	H	A	A	H
Result	W	W	L	W	D	L	L	L	L	D	L	L	D	L	L	W	W	D	D	L
Position	3	2	3	2	2	2	4	4	5	4	5	7	8	8	8	7	7	7	7	7

Updated to match(es) played on 8 March 2020. Source: See Results
A = Away; H = Home; W = Win; D = Draw; L = Loss

==== Results ====
18 August 2019 1	Sabail	1 – 0	Zira	Baku
20:00 AZT (UTC+4)	Cociuc 80' (pen.)	Report	Scarlatache (yellow card) 73'; Tigroudja (yellow card) 90+2'	Stadium: Bayil Arena; Attendance: 400; Referee: Ravan Həmzəzadə

24 August 2019 2	Sumgayit	0 – 3	Sabail	Sumqayit
19:00 AZT (UTC+4)	Hüseynov (yellow card) 31'; Yunanov (yellow card) 64'; S.Aliyev (yellow card) 72'	Report	Ramazanov 10' (pen.), 69'; Muradbayli (yellow card) 36'; Rahimov 51'	Stadium: Kapital Bank Arena; Attendance: 1,300; Referee: Vuqar Həsənli

1 September 2019 3	Sabail	0 – 4	Qarabağ	Baku
21:00 AZT (UTC+4)	Ramazanov (yellow card) 20'; Amirguliyev (yellow card) 58'; Rahimov (yellow card) 70'	Report	Quintana 2'; I.Ibrahimli 29', 59'; Rherras (yellow card) 44'; Emreli 62' (yellow card) 67'; Medvedev (yellow card) 86'	Stadium: Bayil Arena; Attendance: 2,000; Referee: Kamal Umudlu

15 September 2019 4	Keşla	1 – 2	Sabail	Baku
18:00 AZT (UTC+4)	A.Salahli (yellow card) 30'; Flores (yellow card) 30'; Frutos 54'; Bojović (yellow card) 64'; Isgandarli (yellow card) 71'	Report	Mira.Abbasov 18', 30' (pen.); Rahimov (yellow card) 22'; Yunuszade (yellow card) 64'; Cociuc (yellow card) 85'; Muradbayli (yellow card) 86'	Stadium: Bakcell Arena; Attendance: 400; Referee: Elcin Məsiyev

21 September 2019 5	Sabail	1 – 1	Gabala	Baku
19:45 AZT (UTC+4)	Rahimov (yellow card) 58'; Mirab.Abbasov 68' (yellow card) 89'	Report	R.Muradov 17'; Ferreiroa (yellow card) 45+2'; Žunić (yellow card) 56'; Gigauri (yellow card) 64'; R.Huseynov (yellow card) 71'; F.Hajiyev (yellow card) 88'; Q.Aliyev (yellow card) 90+2'	Stadium: Bayil Arena; Attendance: 500; Referee: Aliyar Ağayev

29 September 2019 6	Sabah	3 – 0	Sabail	Masazır
17:30 AZT (UTC+4)	A.Diallo (yellow card) 15'; Diniyev 78'; Imamverdiyev 83'; S.Seyidov 90+6'	Report	Amirguliyev (yellow card) 74'	Stadium: Alinja Arena; Attendance: 300; Referee: Orkhan Mammadov

5 October 2019 7	Neftçi	2 – 1	Sabail	Baku
19:15 AZT (UTC+4)	Buludov (yellow card) 15'; Joseph-Monrose 41'; Krivotsyuk 44'; Stanković (yellow card) 61'; Aliyev (yellow card) 85'; Mammadov (yellow card) 90+3'	Report	Ramazanov (yellow card) 6' (goal) 81'; Rahimov (yellow card) 33'; Cociuc (yellow card) 51'; Essien (yellow card) 80'	Stadium: Eighth Kilometer District Stadium; Attendance: 1,200; Referee: Rauf Jabbarov

20 October 2019 8	Sabail	0 – 2	Sumgayit	Baku
19:30 AZT (UTC+4)	E.Yagublu (yellow card) 3'; Mira.Abbasov (yellow card) 28'; Ramazanov (yellow card) 76'	Report	S.Tashkin (yellow card) 27'; Babaei 47'; Jannatov (yellow card) 87'; Khodzhaniyazov (yellow card) 90'; E.Jafarguliyev 90+4' (yellow card) 90+4'	Stadium: Bayil Arena; Attendance: 400; Referee: Rahim Həsənov

28 October 2019 9	Qarabağ	1 – 0	Sabail	Baku
19:00 AZT (UTC+4)	Míchel (yellow card) 85'; Garayev 87'	Report	Rahimli (yellow card) 46'; Abbasov (yellow card) 80'	Stadium: Tofiq Bahramov Republican Stadium; Attendance: 1,000; Referee: Orkhan Məmmədov

2 November 2019 10	Sabail	0 – 0	Keşla	Baku
16:00 AZT (UTC+4)	Rahimli (yellow card) 1'; Muradbayli (yellow card) 18'; Mira.Abbasov (yellow card) 84'	Report	Qirtimov (yellow card) 24'; Meza (yellow card) 61'	Stadium: Bayil Arena; Attendance: 150; Referee: Ravan Həmzəzadə

9 November 2019 11	Gabala	3 – 0	Sabail	Qabala
15:00 AZT (UTC+4)	Volkovi 22', 45+2'; Clésio (yellow card) 44'; U.Isgandarov 90+2'	Report	Manafov (yellow card) 47'; Ramazanov (yellow card) 50'; Yunuszade (yellow card) 74'; A.Sadixov (red card) 80'	Stadium: Gabala City Stadium; Attendance: 180; Referee: Elcin Masiyev

23 November 2019 12	Sabail	1 – 3	Sabah	Baku
15:00 AZT (UTC+4)	Abbasov (yellow card) 26'; Rahimli (yellow card) 27'; Naghiyev (yellow card) 49' (yellow-red card) 86'; M.Isayev 77' (o.g.)	Report	S.Seyidov (yellow card) 45+1'; Stamenković (yellow card) 54'; U.Diallo 88', 90'; Ekstein 90+7'	Stadium: Bayil Arena; Attendance: 500; Referee: Sabuhi Bayramov

1 December 2019 13	Sabail	0 – 0	Neftçi	Baku
15:00 AZT (UTC+4)	Rahimov (yellow card) 73'; Beybalayev (yellow card) 78'	Report		Stadium: Bayil Arena; Attendance: 800; Referee: Orkhan Mammadov

8 December 2019 14	Zira	4 – 1	Sabail	Zirə
15:00 AZT (UTC+4)	N.Suleymanov 5', 20'; Scarlatache 60'; Mutallimov 88'	Report	Rahimov (yellow card) 27'; Erico 78'; Ramazanov (yellow card) 90+2'	Stadium: Zira Olympic Sport Complex Stadium; Attendance: 300; Referee: Aliyar Ağayev

2 February 2020 15	Sabail	0 – 1	Qarabağ	Baku
17:30 AZT (UTC+4)	Aliyev (yellow card) 90+1'	Report	Míchel (yellow card) 23'; B.Huseynov (yellow card) 28'; Emreli 81'; Medvedev (yellow card) 90+2'; S.Məhəmmədəliyev (yellow card) 90+5'	Stadium: Bayil Arena; Attendance: 1,000; Referee: Ingilab Məmmədov

7 February 2020 16	Keşla	0 – 1	Sabail	Baku
21:00 AZT (UTC+4)	Kamara (yellow card) 25'; Qirtimov (yellow card) 50'	Report	Ekstein 51' (pen.); Rybka (yellow card) 90+5'	Stadium: ASK Arena; Attendance: 650; Referee: Aliyar Ağayev

16 February 2020 17	Sabail	3 – 1	Gabala	Baku
16:30 AZT (UTC+4)	Amirguliyev (yellow card) 52'; M.Abbasov 57'; Hajiyev (yellow card) 61'; Aliyev 70'; Ekstein 82' (pen.)	Report	Rajsel 16'; Clésio (yellow card) 55'; Ferreiroa (yellow card) 61' (yellow-red card) 75'; Nazirov (yellow card) 81'	Stadium: Bayil Arena; Attendance: 300; Referee: Kamal Umudlu

23 February 2020 18	Sabah	0 – 0	Sabail	Masazır
16:00 AZT (UTC+4)	Khalilzade (yellow card) 56'	Report	Essien (yellow card) 11'; Naghiyev (yellow card) 12'; Rahimov (yellow card) 65'	Stadium: Alinja Arena; Attendance: 1,000; Referee: Vugar Həsənli

1 March 2020 19	Neftçi	1 – 1	Sabail	Baku
17:00 AZT (UTC+4)	Akhundov (yellow card) 23'; Buludov (yellow card) 45+1'; Erico 55' (o.g.); Krivotsyuk (yellow card) 69'; Dário (yellow card) 82'	Report	Aliyev (yellow card) 16' (goal) 90+2'; Abbasov (yellow card) 67'; Ekstein (yellow card) 74'	Stadium: Eighth Kilometer District Stadium; Attendance: 1,100; Referee: Sabuhi Bayramov

8 March 2020 20	Sabail	1 – 3	Zira	Baku
16:00 AZT (UTC+4)	Abbasov (yellow card) 32'; Aliyev 34'; Amirguliyev (yellow card) 39'; Naghiyev (yellow card) 83'	Report	Volkovi 13'; I.Muradov (yellow card) 35'; Ramazanov 59' (yellow card) 66'; Tigroudja 81'; Balayev (yellow card) 86'; Scarlatache (yellow card) 88'	Stadium: Bayil Arena; Attendance: 700; Referee: Ingilab Məmmədov

14 March 2020 21	Sumgayit	–	Sabail	Sumqayit
AZT (UTC+4)				Stadium: Kapital Bank Arena
Note: Match postponed on 13 March due to the COVID-19 pandemic.

20 March 2020 22	Sabail	–	Keşla	Baku
AZT (UTC+4)				Stadium: Bayil Arena
Note: Match postponed on 13 March due to the COVID-19 pandemic.

==== League table ====
Pos	Team	Pld	W	D	L	GF	GA	GD	Pts	Qualification or relegation
4	Sumgayit	20	6	5	9	24	32	−8	23	Qualification for the Europa League first qualifying round
5	Zira	20	6	5	9	25	37	−12	23	
6	Sabah	20	5	6	9	19	27	−8	21	
7	Sabail	20	5	5	10	16	30	−14	20	
8	Gabala	20	5	4	11	25	35	−10	19	

Source: Soccerway
Rules for classification: 1) Points; 2) Head-to-head points; 3) Head-to-head goal difference; 4) Head-to-head goals scored; 5) Head-to-head away goals scored (only if two teams); 6) Goal difference; 7) Goals scored.

=== Azerbaijan Cup ===
15 December 2019 Quarterfinal 1st leg	Sabail	0 – 0	Zira	Baku
17:00 AZT (UTC+4)		Report	Bakrač (yellow card) 68'	Stadium: Bayil Arena; Attendance: 300; Referee: Kamal Umudlu

19 December 2019 Quarterfinal 2nd leg	Zira	1 – 0 (a.e.t.) (1 – 0 agg.)	Sabail	Zirə
15:00 AZT (UTC+4)	Kgaswane (yellow card) 68'; Jamalov (yellow card) 84'; J.Huseynov (yellow card) 89'; Gadze (yellow card) 89'; Mammadov (yellow card) 90+3'; Rodríguez 105+1'; O.Sadigli (yellow card) 120+3'	Report	Amirguliyev (yellow card) 90+2'; Naghiyev (yellow card) 120+3'	Stadium: Zira Olympic Sport Complex Stadium; Attendance: 500; Referee: Rahim Hasanov

=== UEFA Europa League ===
==== Qualifying rounds ====
11 July 2019 First qualifying round 1st leg	Sabail (Azerbaijan)	2 – 3	(Romania) Universitatea Craiova	Baku, Azerbaijan
20:00 AZST (UTC+4)	Ramazanov 33', 82' (yellow card) 87' Erico (yellow card) 73'	Report	Martić (yellow card) 7'; Mateiu 13'; Bancu 51'; Roman 67'	Stadium: Bayil Arena; Attendance: 2,550; Referee: Ville Nevalainen (Finland)

18 July 2019 First qualifying round 2nd leg	Universitatea Craiova (Romania)	3 – 2 (6 – 4 agg.)	(Azerbaijan) Sabail	Craiova, Romania
21:00 AZST (UTC+4)	Cicâldău 28'; Vătăjelu 54'; Fortes 90'	Report	Ramazanov 67' (yellow card) 85'; Duventru 69'; Yunuszade (yellow card) 79'	Stadium: Stadionul Ion Oblemenco; Referee: Helgi Mikael Jónasson (Iceland)

== Squad statistics ==
As of Match played 8 March 2020

=== Appearances and goals ===
No.	Pos	Nat	Player	Total		Premier League		Azerbaijan Cup		Europa League	
No.	Pos	Nat	Player	Apps	Goals	Apps	Goals	Apps	Goals	Apps	Goals
1	GK	(Ukraine) UKR	Oleksandr Rybka	11	0	9	0	2	0	0	0
3	DF	(Azerbaijan) AZE	Turan Manafov	16	0	15+1	0	0	0	0	0
4	DF	(Azerbaijan) AZE	Eltun Yagublu	11	0	7+2	0	0	0	0+2	0
5	MF	(Azerbaijan) AZE	Vugar Beybalayev	8	0	4+2	0	0+1	0	1	0
7	MF	(Azerbaijan) AZE	Fahmin Muradbayli	22	0	13+5	0	2	0	0+2	0
8	MF	(Democratic Republic of the Congo) COD	Lema Mabidi	2	0	0+2	0	0	0	0	0
9	MF	(Azerbaijan) AZE	Mirsahib Abbasov	16	1	7+7	1	2	0	0	0
10	MF	(Ghana) GHA	Michael Essien	11	0	5+5	0	0	0	1	0
11	FW	(Azerbaijan) AZE	Rauf Aliyev	5	3	5	3	0	0	0	0
13	DF	(Azerbaijan) AZE	Shahriyar Rahimov	22	1	18	1	2	0	2	0
14	MF	(Azerbaijan) AZE	Rahid Amirguliyev	24	0	20	0	2	0	2	0
16	DF	(Iran) IRI	Peyman Keshavarz	2	0	2	0	0	0	0	0
17	MF	(Azerbaijan) AZE	Elchin Rahimli	13	0	6+5	0	2	0	0	0
18	MF	(Azerbaijan) AZE	Agshin Gurbanli	2	0	0+2	0	0	0	0	0
19	MF	(Azerbaijan) AZE	Ruslan Hajiyev	9	0	5+2	0	0+2	0	0	0
21	DF	(Brazil) BRA	Erico	12	1	8	1	2	0	2	0
27	MF	(South Africa) RSA	Hendrick Ekstein	6	2	5+1	2	0	0	0	0
34	DF	(Azerbaijan) AZE	Urfan Abbasov	24	0	20	0	2	0	2	0
55	DF	(Azerbaijan) AZE	Adil Naghiyev	17	0	13+2	0	2	0	0	0
77	MF	(Azerbaijan) AZE	Adilkhan Garahmadov	11	0	1+8	0	2	0	0	0
79	MF	(Azerbaijan) AZE	Ali Sadixov	8	0	0+6	0	0+2	0	0	0
85	GK	(Azerbaijan) AZE	Kamal Bayramov	11	0	11	0	0	0	0	0
88	MF	(Azerbaijan) AZE	Orxan Gurbanli	5	0	0+4	0	0+1	0	0	0
97	MF	(Azerbaijan) AZE	Bahadur Haziyev	1	0	0+1	0	0	0	0	0
Players away from Sabail on loan:
Players who left Sabail during the season:
8	MF	(Moldova) MDA	Eugeniu Cociuc	14	1	12	1	0	0	2	0
10	FW	(Azerbaijan) AZE	Aghabala Ramazanov	17	6	13	3	2	0	2	3
11	MF	(France) FRA	Dylan Duventru	2	1	0	0	0	0	0+2	1
12	GK	(North Macedonia) MKD	Daniel Bozhinovski	2	0	0	0	0	0	2	0
16	DF	(Ukraine) UKR	Ihor Korotetskyi	1	0	0+1	0	0	0	0	0
22	FW	(Azerbaijan) AZE	Mirabdulla Abbasov	13	3	9+2	3	0	0	2	0
32	DF	(Azerbaijan) AZE	Elvin Yunuszade	13	0	11	0	0	0	2	0
91	MF	(Algeria) ALG	Bilal Hamdi	2	0	0	0	0	0	2	0

=== Goal scorers ===
Place	Position	Nation	Number	Name	Premier League	Azerbaijan Cup	Europa League	Total
1	FW	(Azerbaijan)	10	Aghabala Ramazanov	3	0	3	6
2	FW	(Azerbaijan)	22	Mirabdulla Abbasov	3	0	0	3
2	FW	(Azerbaijan)	11	Rauf Aliyev	3	0	0	3
4	MF	(South Africa)	27	Hendrick Ekstein	2	0	0	2
5	MF	(Moldova)	8	Eugeniu Cociuc	1	0	0	1
5	DF	(Azerbaijan)	13	Shahriyar Rahimov	1	0	0	1
5	DF	(Brazil)	21	Erico	1	0	0	1
5	MF	(Azerbaijan)	9	Mirsahib Abbasov	1	0	0	1
5	MF	(France)	11	Dylan Duventru	0	0	1	1
5				Own goal	1	0	0	1
				TOTALS	16	0	4	20

=== Clean sheets ===
Place	Position	Nation	Number	Name	Premier League	Azerbaijan Cup	Europa League	Total
1	GK	(Ukraine)	1	Oleksandr Rybka	3	1	0	4
2	GK	(Azerbaijan)	85	Kamal Bayramov	3	0	0	3
				TOTALS	6	1	0	7

=== Disciplinary record ===
Number	Nation	Position	Name	Premier League		Azerbaijan Cup		Europa League		Total	
Number	Nation	Position	Name	Yellow card	Red card	Yellow card	Red card	Yellow card	Red card	Yellow card	Red card
1	(Ukraine)	GK	Oleksandr Rybka	1	0	0	0	0	0	1	0
3	(Azerbaijan)	DF	Turan Manafov	1	0	0	0	0	0	1	0
4	(Azerbaijan)	DF	Eltun Yagublu	1	0	0	0	0	0	1	0
5	(Azerbaijan)	MF	Vugar Beybalayev	1	0	0	0	0	0	1	0
7	(Azerbaijan)	MF	Fahmin Muradbayli	3	0	0	0	0	0	3	0
10	(Ghana)	MF	Michael Essien	2	0	0	0	0	0	2	0
11	(Azerbaijan)	FW	Rauf Aliyev	2	0	0	0	0	0	2	0
13	(Azerbaijan)	DF	Shahriyar Rahimov	7	0	0	0	0	0	7	0
14	(Azerbaijan)	MF	Rahid Amirguliyev	4	0	1	0	0	0	5	0
17	(Azerbaijan)	MF	Elchin Rahimli	3	0	0	0	0	0	3	0
19	(Azerbaijan)	MF	Ruslan Hajiyev	1	0	0	0	0	0	1	0
21	(Brazil)	DF	Erico	0	0	0	0	1	0	1	0
27	(South Africa)	MF	Hendrick Ekstein	1	0	0	0	0	0	1	0
34	(Azerbaijan)	DF	Urfan Abbasov	4	0	0	0	0	0	4	0
55	(Azerbaijan)	DF	Adil Naghiyev	4	1	1	0	0	0	5	1
79	(Azerbaijan)	MF	Ali Sadixov	0	1	0	0	0	0	0	1
Players who left Sabail during the season:
8	(Moldova)	MF	Eugeniu Cociuc	2	0	0	0	0	0	2	0
10	(Azerbaijan)	FW	Aghabala Ramazanov	5	0	0	0	2	0	7	0
22	(Azerbaijan)	FW	Mirabdulla Abbasov	3	0	0	0	0	0	3	0
32	(Azerbaijan)	DF	Elvin Yunuszade	2	0	0	0	1	0	3	0
			TOTALS	47	2	2	0	4	0	53	2
