= 2019–20 Zira FK season =

Zira
2019-20 season
- President: Vugar Astanov
- Manager: Samir Abbasov (Until 8 October); Zaur Hashimov (From 9 October)
- Stadium: Zira Olympic Sport Complex Stadium
- Premier League: 5th
- Azerbaijan Cup: Semifinal
- Top goalscorer: League: Two Players (4); All: Julio Rodríguez (6)

The Zira FK 2019–20 season was Zira's fifth Azerbaijan Premier League season, and sixth season in their history. Zira finished the season in 5th position and were scheduled to face Gabala in the Azerbaijan Cup semifinals before the season was ended prematurely due to COVID-19 pandemic in Azerbaijan.

== Season events ==
On 8 October, Samir Abbasov left his role as manager of Zira by mutual consent. On 9 October, Zaur Hashimov was appointed as Zira's new manager until the end of the season.

On 21 December, Zira announced the singing of Aghabala Ramazanov and Davit Volkovi on an 18-month contracts starting from 1 January 2020.

On 11 January, Sony Norde was released by Zira.

On 14 January, Alie Sesay joined Zira on an 18-month contract.

On 21 January, Jovan Krneta returned to Zira, signing until the end of the season.

On 25 January, Gheorghe Anton signed for Zira on an 18-month contract.

On 27 January, Robin Ngalande was released by Zira.

On 29 January, Julio Rodríguez left Zira by mutual consent.

On 2 February, Elvin Mammadov left Zira by mutual consent.

On 3 March, Zira announced the signing of Emil Balayev on a contract until the end of the season.

On 13 March 2020, the Azerbaijan Premier League was postponed due to the COVID-19 pandemic.

On 19 June 2020, the AFFA announced that the 2019–20 season had been officially ended without the resumption of the remains matches due to the escalating situation of the COVID-19 pandemic in Azerbaijan.

== Squad ==
As of match played 8 March 2020

No.	Name	Nationality	Position	Date of birth (age)	Signed from	Signed in	Contract ends	Apps.	Goals
Goalkeepers
1	Orkhan Sadigli	(Azerbaijan)	GK	19 March 1993 (aged 27)	Keşla	2019		16	0
12	Emil Balayev	(Azerbaijan)	GK	17 April 1994 (aged 26)	Tobol	2020	2020	1	0
28	Bojan Zogović	(Montenegro)	GK	16 February 1989 (aged 31)	Bačka	2019	2020	8	0
62	Abdulla Seyidahmadov	(Azerbaijan)	GK	4 June 1997 (aged 23)	Trainee	2017		2	0
Defenders
3	Alie Sesay	(Sierra Leone)	DF	2 August 1994 (aged 25)	Arda Kardzhali	2020	2021	6	0
5	Anastasios Papazoglou	(Greece)	DF	24 September 1988 (aged 31)	OFI	2019	2020	11	0
6	Álvaro Ampuero	(Peru)	DF	25 September 1992 (aged 27)	loan from Deportivo Municipal	2019	2020	18	0
14	Bəxtiyar Həsənalızadə	(Azerbaijan)	DF	29 December 1992 (aged 27)	Sumgayit	2019	2020	26	0
16	Ibrahim Aslanli	(Azerbaijan)	DF	21 March 1997 (aged 23)	Qarabağ	2017	2020	7	1
25	Miloš Bakrač	(Montenegro)	DF	25 February 1992 (aged 28)	Titograd	2019	2020	13	0
27	Adrian Scarlatache	(Romania)	DF	5 December 1986 (aged 33)	Keşla	2018	2019	40	1
33	Jovan Krneta	(Serbia)	DF	4 May 1992 (aged 28)	Levadiakos	2020	2020	85	6
55	Rauf Huseynli	(Azerbaijan)	DF	25 January 2000 (aged 20)	loan from Qarabağ	2020		3	0
77	Cəlal Hüseynov	(Azerbaijan)	DF	2 January 2003 (aged 17)	Academy	2019		1	0
Midfielders
4	Elvin Jamalov	(Azerbaijan)	MF	4 February 1995 (aged 25)	Gabala	2019	2021	20	0
7	Javid Huseynov	(Azerbaijan)	MF	9 March 1988 (aged 32)	Gabala	2019	2021	17	2
8	Ilkin Muradov	(Azerbaijan)	MF	5 March 1996 (aged 24)	Academy	2019		65	2
18	Gheorghe Anton	(Moldova)	MF	27 January 1993 (aged 27)	Sheriff Tiraspol	2020	2021	6	0
19	Müşfiq İlyasov	(Azerbaijan)	MF	8 May 1996 (aged 24)	Academy	2016		7	1
20	Ali Shirinov	(Azerbaijan)	MF	9 August 1998 (aged 21)	Daugavpils	2020		1	0
23	Mpho Kgaswane	(Botswana)	MF	12 June 1994 (aged 26)	Baroka	2019	2019	28	5
48	Chafik Tigroudja	(France)	MF	16 January 1992 (aged 28)	Kukësi	2019		20	3
64	Kanan Jafarov	(Azerbaijan)	MF	9 March 2000 (aged 20)	Academy	2019		1	0
70	Nijat Suleymanov	(Azerbaijan)	MF	15 November 1998 (aged 21)	loan Qarabağ	2019		15	5
88	Tellur Mutallimov	(Azerbaijan)	MF	8 April 1995 (aged 25)	Gabala	2017	2020	54	4
97	Tapdiq Əhmədov	(Azerbaijan)	MF	8 May 1997 (aged 23)	Academy	2017		1	0
99	Rafael Maharramli	(Azerbaijan)	MF	1 October 1999 (aged 20)	loan Qarabağ	2019		13	0
Forwards
10	Aghabala Ramazanov	(Azerbaijan)	FW	20 January 1993 (aged 27)	Sabail	2020	2021	4	3
11	Davit Volkovi	(Georgia (country))	FW	3 June 1995 (aged 25)	Gabala	2020	2021	6	1
43	Richard Gadze	(Ghana)	FW	23 August 1994 (aged 25)	Voluntari	2019	2020	54	15
Left during the season
10	Elvin Mammadov	(Azerbaijan)	MF	18 July 1988 (aged 31)	Sumgayit	2019	2021	56	6
11	Sony Norde	(Haiti)	FW	27 July 1989 (aged 30)	Mohun Bagan	2019	2020	13	1
17	Robin Ngalande	(Malawi)	FW	2 November 1992 (aged 27)	Baroka	2019	2019	13	1
18	Julio Rodríguez	(Paraguay)	FW	5 December 1990 (aged 29)	Deportivo Capiatá	2019		28	15
57	Kənan Zülfüqarov	(Azerbaijan)	DF	19 April 1999 (aged 21)	Trainee	2017		0	0

== Transfers ==
=== In ===
Date	Position	Nationality	Name	From	Fee	Ref.
31 May 2019	MF	(Azerbaijan)	Elvin Mammadov	Sumgayit	Undisclosed	
2 June 2019	MF	(Azerbaijan)	Javid Huseynov	Gabala	Free	
3 June 2019	MF	(Azerbaijan)	Elvin Jamalov	Gabala	Free	
21 June 2019	GK	(Montenegro)	Bojan Zogović	Bačka	Undisclosed	
12 July 2019	DF	(Montenegro)	Miloš Bakrač	OFK Titograd	Undisclosed	
16 July 2019	FW	(Haiti)	Sony Norde	Mohun Bagan	Undisclosed	
17 July 2019	DF	(Greece)	Anastasios Papazoglou	OFI Crete	Undisclosed	
15 October 2019	FW	(Ghana)	Richard Gadze	Voluntari	Undisclosed	
1 January 2020	FW	(Azerbaijan)	Aghabala Ramazanov	Sabail	Free	
1 January 2020	FW	(Georgia (country))	Davit Volkovi	Gabala	Free	
14 January 2020	DF	(Sierra Leone)	Alie Sesay	Arda Kardzhali	Undisclosed	
21 January 2020	DF	(Serbia)	Jovan Krneta	Levadiakos	Undisclosed	
25 January 2020	MF	(Moldova)	Gheorghe Anton	Sheriff Tiraspol	Free	
3 March 2020	GK	(Azerbaijan)	Emil Balayev	Tobol	Free	
Winter 2020	MF	(Azerbaijan)	Ali Shirinov		Free	

=== Loans in ===
Date from	Position	Nationality	Name	From	Date to	Ref.
13 June 2019	MF	(Azerbaijan)	Nijat Suleymanov	Qarabağ	End of Season	
14 August 2019	DF	(Peru)	Álvaro Ampuero	Deportivo Municipal	End of Season	
Winter 2020	DF	(Azerbaijan)	Rauf Huseynli	Qarabağ	End of Season	

=== Out ===
Date	Position	Nationality	Name	To	Fee	Ref.
Summer 2019	DF	(Azerbaijan)	Murad Musayev	Gabala	Undisclosed	
Summer 2019	MF	(Azerbaijan)	Mirsahib Abbasov	Sabail	Undisclosed	
22 May 2019	GK	(Azerbaijan)	Kamal Bayramov	Sabail	Undisclosed	
4 June 2019	DF	(Azerbaijan)	Vugar Mustafayev	Sumgayit	Undisclosed	
15 June 2019	MF	(Azerbaijan)	Kamal Mirzayev	Gabala	Undisclosed	
23 June 2019	MF	(Algeria)	Bilal Hamdi	Sabail	Undisclosed	
8 July 2019	DF	(Azerbaijan)	Ilkin Qirtimov	Keşla	Undisclosed	

=== Released ===
Date	Position	Nationality	Name	Joined	Date
11 January 2020	FW	(Haiti)	Sony Norde	Melaka United	
27 January 2020	FW	(Malawi)	Robin Ngalande	Saint George	8 October 2020
29 January 2020	FW	(Paraguay)	Julio Rodríguez	Sabah	29 January 2020
2 February 2020	MF	(Azerbaijan)	Elvin Mammadov	Sumgayit	17 July 2020
30 June 2020	DF	(Greece)	Anastasios Papazoglou	Xanthi	

== Friendlies ==
11 January 2020	Zira (Azerbaijan)	0 – 3	(Turkey) Ümraniyespor	Belek, Turkey
AZST (UTC+4)		Report

16 January 2020	Zira (Azerbaijan)	2 – 0	(Romania) Sepsi OSK	Belek, Turkey
AZST (UTC+4)	Gadze	Report

21 January 2020	Zira (Azerbaijan)	2 – 0	(Serbia) Napredak Kruševac	Belek, Turkey
AZST (UTC+4)	Gadze 29'; Volkovi 57'	Report

10 June 2020	Zira	2 – 2	Sabail	Zirə
AZST (UTC+4)	Ramazanov 16'; Kgaswane 70'	Report	Essien 30'; T.Manafov 49'	Stadium: Zira Olympic Sport Complex Stadium

== Competitions ==
=== Azerbaijan Premier League ===
==== Results summary ====
Overall								Home						Away					
Pld	W	D	L	GF	GA	GD	Pts	W	D	L	GF	GA	GD	W	D	L	GF	GA	GD
20	7	5	8	26	36	−10	26	4	3	3	15	17	−2	3	2	5	11	19	−8

Last updated: 8 March 2020.
Source: See Results

==== Results by round ====
Round	1	2	3	4	5	6	7	8	9	10	11	12	13	14	15	16	17	18	19	20
Ground	A	H	H	A	H	A	H	A	A	A	A	H	A	H	H	A	H	A	H	A
Result	L	W	D	W	L	L	D	L	D	D	D	W	L	W	W	L	L	L	L	W
Position	7	4	5	3	4	5	5	6	6	6	6	5	5	5	4	5	5	5	6	4

Updated to match(es) played on 8 March 2020. Source: See Results
A = Away; H = Home; W = Win; D = Draw; L = Loss

==== Results ====
18 August 2019 1	Sabail	1 – 0	Zira	Baku
20:00 AZT (UTC+4)	Cociuc 80' (pen.)	Report	Scarlatache (yellow card) 73'; Tigroudja (yellow card) 90+2'	Stadium: Bayil Arena; Attendance: 400; Referee: Ravan Həmzəzadə

26 August 2019 2	Zira	1 – 0	Neftçi	Zirə
19:00 AZT (UTC+4)	Huseynov 27'; B.Hasanalizade (yellow card) 81'; O.Sadigli (yellow card) 90+4'	Report	Petrov (yellow card) 46'; Akhundov (yellow card) 72'	Stadium: Zira Olympic Sport Complex Stadium; Attendance: 1,000; Referee: Rahim Həsənov

31 August 2019 3	Zira	1 – 1	Sabah	Zirə
20:30 AZT (UTC+4)	Bakrač (yellow card) 16'; Jamalov (yellow card) 33'; Norde (yellow card) 77' (goal) 88'; Huseynov (yellow card) 85'; Scarlatache (yellow card) 90+4'	Report	A.Diallo 35'; M.Isayev (yellow card) 77'; A.Aghazade (yellow card) 90+5'	Stadium: Zira Olympic Sport Complex Stadium; Attendance: 1,200; Referee: Rovan Rəcəbov

14 September 2019 4	Sumgayit	1 – 2	Zira	Sumgayit
18:00 AZT (UTC+4)	S.Aliyev (yellow card) 12'; Mutallimov 16' (o.g.); Sharifi (yellow card) 70'; Malikov (yellow card) 88'	Report	Rodríguez 5'; Huseynov (yellow card) 44'; Bakrač (yellow card) 67'; B.Hasanalizade (yellow card) 77'; Tigroudja 88'	Stadium: Kapital Bank Arena; Attendance: 1,400; Referee: Kamal Umudlu

23 September 2019 5	Zira	1 – 3	Qarabağ	Zirə
19:00 AZT (UTC+4)	Rodríguez 88'; Ampuero (yellow card) 90+3'	Report	Gueye 12'; B.Huseynov (yellow card) 18'; Romero 41'; Papazoglou 44' (o.g.); Sadygov (yellow card) 90'	Stadium: Zira Olympic Sport Complex Stadium; Attendance: 1,200; Referee: Rauf Jabbarov

29 September 2019 6	Keşla	2 – 0	Zira	Baku
19:45 AZT (UTC+4)	Gurbanov 51'; Isgandarli (yellow card) 53'; Frutos 62'; J.Amirli (yellow card) 84'	Report	B.Hasanalizade (yellow card) 31'; Huseynov (yellow card) 35'	Stadium: Bayil Arena; Attendance: 500; Referee: Aliyar Ağayev

6 October 2019 7	Zira	1 – 1	Gabala	Zirə
18:00 AZT (UTC+4)	I.Muradov 67'; Mammadov (yellow card) 74'	Report	Ferreiroa (yellow card) 40'; G.Aliyev (yellow card) 60'; U.Isgandarov 65'; Nazirov (yellow card) 90+1'	Stadium: Zira Olympic Sport Complex Stadium; Attendance: 1,000; Referee: Ingilab Məmmədov

20 October 2019 8	Neftçi	3 – 0	Zira	Baku
17:00 AZT (UTC+4)	Dário 27'; Petrov (yellow card) 36'; Dabo 46'; Stanković (yellow card) 54'; Joseph-Monrose 76'; M.Kane (yellow card) 84'	Report	Norde (yellow card) 22'; Huseynov (yellow card) 36'; I.Muradov (yellow card) 61'; Ampuero (yellow card) 70'; Kgaswane (yellow card) 90+1'; B.Hasanalizade (yellow card) 90+3'	Stadium: Eighth Kilometer District Stadium; Attendance: 1,000; Referee: Rovan Rəcəbov

26 October 2019 9	Sabah	2 – 2	Zira	Masazır
18:00 AZT (UTC+4)	A.Diallo 28', 44'; Eyyubov (yellow card) 90+2'	Report	N.Suleymanov 22', 88'; Scarlatache (yellow card) 90+3'	Stadium: Alinja Arena; Attendance: 750; Referee: Elcin Masiyev

3 November 2019 10	Zira	2 – 2	Sumgayit	Zirə
15:00 AZT (UTC+4)	Kgaswane 3' (yellow card) 44'; Scarlatache (yellow card) 27'; I.Muradov (yellow card) 45+3'; Gadze (yellow card) 49' (goal) 57'; Norde (yellow card) 74'	Report	Mustafayev (yellow card) 15'; Babaei 28' (pen.); Khodzhaniyazov (yellow card) 33'; Agayev 81'; Hüseynov (yellow card) 90+1'	Stadium: Zira Olympic Sport Complex Stadium; Attendance: 500; Referee: Sabuhi Bayramov

10 November 2019 11	Qarabağ	1 – 1	Zira	Baku
19:00 AZT (UTC+4)	Gueye 5'	Report	Mutallimov (yellow card) 30'; Huseynov (yellow card) 37'; Gadze (yellow card) 45+2' (goal) 70'; Bakrač (yellow card) 55'; Kgaswane (yellow card) 67'	Stadium: Tofiq Bahramov Republican Stadium; Attendance: 600; Referee: Aliyar Ağayev

24 November 2019 12	Zira	3 – 1	Keşla	Zirə
15:00 AZT (UTC+4)	N.Suleymanov (yellow card) 4'; Rodríguez 6' (pen.), 11'; Huseynov 35'; Jamalov (yellow card) 58'; Gadze (yellow card) 83'	Report	Flores (yellow card) 20'; Gurbanov 45+4'; Meza (yellow card) 58' (yellow-red card) 60'	Stadium: Zira Olympic Sport Complex Stadium; Attendance: 600; Referee: Orkhan Məmmədov

30 November 2019 13	Gabala	3 – 0	Zira	Qabala
15:00 AZT (UTC+4)	R.Muradov 13' (yellow card) 64'; A.Seydiyev (yellow card) 16'; Ferreiroa 42' (yellow card) 59'; Volkovi (yellow card) 66' (goal) 70'; Nazirov (yellow card) 82'	Report	Jamalov (yellow card) 45+2'; Scarlatache (yellow card) 45+4'; Kgaswane (yellow card) 78'	Stadium: Gabala City Stadium; Attendance: 400; Referee: Ravan Hamzazada

8 December 2019 14	Zira	4 – 1	Sabail	Zirə
15:00 AZT (UTC+4)	N.Suleymanov 5', 20'; Scarlatache 60'; Mutallimov 88'	Report	Rahimov (yellow card) 27'; Erico 78'; Ramazanov (yellow card) 90+2'	Stadium: Zira Olympic Sport Complex Stadium; Attendance: 300; Referee: Aliyar Ağayev

1 February 2020 15	Zira	2 – 0	Sabah	Zirə
15:00 AZT (UTC+4)	Ampuero (yellow card) 15'; Jamalov (yellow card) 37'; Ramazanov 45+1'; I.Muradov (yellow card) 71'; Gadze 78'	Report	Mustafazade (yellow card) 83'	Stadium: Zira Olympic Sport Complex Stadium; Attendance: 400; Referee: Elcin Məsiyev

8 February 2020 16	Sumgayit	2 – 1	Zira	Sumgayit
17:30 AZT (UTC+4)	E.Jafarguliyev 13'; Agayev (yellow card) 41'; Babaei (yellow card) 41'; K.Najafov (yellow card) 53' (goal) 66'; S.Ahmadov (yellow card) 90+3'	Report	Scarlatache (yellow card) 31'; I.Muradov (yellow card) 33' (yellow-red card) 37'; Ramazanov 35' (red card) 68'; J.Huseynov (yellow card) 41'; Tigroudja (yellow card) 41'; Gadze (yellow card) 52'; N.Suleymanov (yellow card) 84'; Anton (yellow card) 90+4'	Stadium: Kapital Bank Arena; Attendance: 800; Referee: Orkhan Mammadov

15 February 2020 17	Zira	0 – 6	Qarabağ	Zirə
15:00 AZT (UTC+4)	Mutallimov (yellow card) 52'; J.Huseynov (red card) 67'; N.Suleymanov (yellow card) 74'; Jamalov (yellow card) 90'	Report	B.Huseynov 4'; Romero 11' (yellow card) 90'; Emreli 14'; Ailton 28' (yellow card) 52'; Zoubir 61'; Gueye 85'	Stadium: Zira Olympic Sport Complex Stadium; Attendance: 1,000; Referee: Rahim Həsənov

22 February 2020 18	Keşla	4 – 0	Zira	Baku
17:00 AZT (UTC+4)	Meza (yellow card) 8'; Kamara (yellow card) 17'; Gadoyev 19', 71' (yellow card) 54'; Isgandarli 45'; P.Azadov 90'	Report	Jamalov (yellow card) 3'	Stadium: ASK Arena; Attendance: 550; Referee: Rauf Jabbarov

1 March 2020 19	Zira	1 – 2	Gabala	Zirə
15:00 AZT (UTC+4)	I.Muradov 21'; Volkovi (yellow card) 34'; Zogović (yellow card) 71'; N.Suleymanov (yellow card) 74'; Scarlatache (yellow card) 87'	Report	Mammadov (yellow card) 27'; Ferreiroa 79'; T.Ahmadli (yellow card) 80'; R.Muradov 88'	Stadium: Zira Olympic Sport Complex Stadium; Attendance: 200; Referee: Orkhan Məmmədov

8 March 2020 20	Sabail	1 – 3	Zira	Baku
16:00 AZT (UTC+4)	Abbasov (yellow card) 32'; Aliyev 34'; Amirguliyev (yellow card) 39'; Naghiyev (yellow card) 83'	Report	Volkovi 13'; I.Muradov (yellow card) 35'; Ramazanov 59' (yellow card) 66'; Tigroudja 81'; Balayev (yellow card) 86'; Scarlatache (yellow card) 88'	Stadium: Bayil Arena; Attendance: 700; Referee: Ingilab Məmmədov

14 March 2020 21	Zira	–	Neftçi	Zirə
AZT (UTC+4)				Stadium: Zira Olympic Sport Complex Stadium
Note: Match postponed on 13 March due to the COVID-19 pandemic.

20 March 2020 22	Zira	–	Sumgayit	Zirə
AZT (UTC+4)				Stadium: Zira Olympic Sport Complex Stadium
Note: Match postponed on 13 March due to the COVID-19 pandemic.

==== League table ====
Pos	Team	Pld	W	D	L	GF	GA	GD	Pts	Qualification or relegation
3	Keşla	20	8	6	6	27	21	+6	30	Qualification for the Europa League first qualifying round
4	Sumgayit	20	6	5	9	24	32	−8	23	Qualification for the Europa League first qualifying round
5	Zira	20	6	5	9	25	37	−12	23	
6	Sabah	20	5	6	9	19	27	−8	21	
7	Sabail	20	5	5	10	16	30	−14	20	

Source: Soccerway
Rules for classification: 1) Points; 2) Head-to-head points; 3) Head-to-head goal difference; 4) Head-to-head goals scored; 5) Head-to-head away goals scored (only if two teams); 6) Goal difference; 7) Goals scored.

=== Azerbaijan Cup ===
4 December 2019 First Round	Zira	4 – 0	Qaradağ Lökbatan	Zirə
14:00 AZT (UTC+4)	Mammadov 45' (pen.); M.Ilyasov 55' (yellow card) 90+3'; I.Aslanli (yellow card) 65' (goal) 79'; Rodríguez 69'	Report	F.Mövsümov (yellow card) 45+2'; S.Zeynalov (yellow card) 50'; T.Mammarzayev (yellow card) 56'; T.Xanlarov (yellow card) 90+4'	Stadium: Zira Olympic Sport Complex Stadium; Attendance: 100; Referee: Raad Ahmadov

15 December 2019 Quarterfinal 1st leg	Sabail	0 – 0	Zira	Baku
17:00 AZT (UTC+4)		Report	Bakrač (yellow card) 68'	Stadium: Bayil Arena; Attendance: 300; Referee: Kamal Umudlu

19 December 2019 Quarterfinal 2nd leg	Zira	1 – 0 (a.e.t.) (1 – 0 agg.)	Sabail	Zirə
15:00 AZT (UTC+4)	Kgaswane (yellow card) 68'; Jamalov (yellow card) 84'; J.Huseynov (yellow card) 89'; Gadze (yellow card) 89'; Mammadov (yellow card) 90+3'; Rodríguez 105+1'; Orkhan Sadigli (yellow card) 120+3'	Report	Amirguliyev (yellow card) 90+2'; Naghiyev (yellow card) 120+3'	Stadium: Zira Olympic Sport Complex Stadium; Attendance: 500; Referee: Rahim Hasanov

22 April 2020 Semifinal 1st leg	Gabala	–	Zira	Qabala
AZT (UTC+4)				Stadium: Gabala City Stadium
Note: Match postponed due to the COVID-19 pandemic

29 April 2020 Semifinal 2nd leg	Zira	– (– agg.)	Gabala	Zirə
AZT (UTC+4)				Stadium: Zira Olympic Sport Complex Stadium
Note: Match postponed due to the COVID-19 pandemic

== Squad statistics ==
As of match played 8 March 2020

=== Appearances and goals ===
No.	Pos	Nat	Player	Total		Premier League		Azerbaijan Cup	
No.	Pos	Nat	Player	Apps	Goals	Apps	Goals	Apps	Goals
1	GK	(Azerbaijan) AZE	Orkhan Sadigli	14	0	11	0	3	0
3	DF	(Sierra Leone) SLE	Alie Sesay	6	0	6	0	0	0
4	MF	(Azerbaijan) AZE	Elvin Jamalov	20	0	18	0	2	0
5	DF	(Greece) GRE	Anastasios Papazoglou	11	0	9+1	0	1	0
6	DF	(Peru) PER	Álvaro Ampuero	18	0	15+1	0	2	0
7	MF	(Azerbaijan) AZE	Javid Huseynov	17	2	15+1	2	1	0
8	MF	(Azerbaijan) AZE	Ilkin Muradov	16	2	12+2	2	2	0
10	FW	(Azerbaijan) AZE	Aghabala Ramazanov	4	3	4	3	0	0
11	FW	(Georgia (country)) GEO	Davit Volkovi	6	1	6	1	0	0
12	GK	(Azerbaijan) AZE	Emil Balayev	1	0	1	0	0	0
14	DF	(Azerbaijan) AZE	Bəxtiyar Həsənalızadə	12	0	9+2	0	1	0
16	DF	(Azerbaijan) AZE	Ibrahim Aslanli	1	1	0	0	1	1
18	MF	(Moldova) MDA	Gheorghe Anton	6	0	5+1	0	0	0
19	MF	(Azerbaijan) AZE	Müşfiq İlyasov	1	1	0	0	1	1
20	MF	(Azerbaijan) AZE	Ali Shirinov	1	0	0+1	0	0	0
23	MF	(Botswana) BOT	Mpho Kgaswane	15	1	5+7	1	3	0
25	DF	(Montenegro) MNE	Miloš Bakrač	13	0	9+2	0	2	0
27	DF	(Romania) ROU	Adrian Scarlatache	17	1	14+1	1	2	0
28	GK	(Montenegro) MNE	Bojan Zogović	8	0	8	0	0	0
33	DF	(Serbia) SRB	Jovan Krneta	2	0	2	0	0	0
43	FW	(Ghana) GHA	Richard Gadze	13	3	11	3	2	0
48	MF	(France) FRA	Chafik Tigroudja	12	2	10+2	2	0	0
55	DF	(Azerbaijan) AZE	Rauf Huseynli	3	0	3	0	0	0
64	MF	(Azerbaijan) AZE	Kənan Cəfərov	1	0	0	0	1	0
70	MF	(Azerbaijan) AZE	Nijat Suleymanov	15	4	11+2	4	2	0
77	DF	(Azerbaijan) AZE	Cəlal Hüseynov	1	0	0	0	0+1	0
88	MF	(Azerbaijan) AZE	Tellur Mutallimov	15	1	8+5	1	2	0
97	MF	(Azerbaijan) AZE	Tapdiq Əhmədov	1	0	0	0	1	0
99	MF	(Azerbaijan) AZE	Rafael Maharramli	10	0	6+3	0	1	0
Players away from Zira on loan:
Players who left Zira during the season:
10	MF	(Azerbaijan) AZE	Elvin Mammadov	13	1	4+6	0	0+3	1
11	FW	(Haiti) HAI	Sony Norde	13	1	6+5	1	1+1	0
17	FW	(Malawi) MAW	Robin Ngalande	7	0	2+3	0	1+1	0
18	FW	(Paraguay) PAR	Julio Rodríguez	14	6	9+2	4	1+2	2

=== Goal scorers ===
Place	Position	Nation	Number	Name	Premier League	Azerbaijan Cup	Total
1	FW	(Paraguay)	19	Julio Rodríguez	4	2	6
2	MF	(Azerbaijan)	70	Nijat Suleymanov	4	0	4
3	FW	(Ghana)	43	Richard Gadze	3	0	3
3	FW	(Azerbaijan)	10	Aghabala Ramazanov	3	0	3
5	MF	(Azerbaijan)	7	Javid Huseynov	2	0	2
5	MF	(Azerbaijan)	8	Ilkin Muradov	2	0	2
7	FW	(Haiti)	11	Sony Norde	1	0	1
7	MF	(France)	48	Chafik Tigroudja	1	0	1
7	MF	(Botswana)	23	Mpho Kgaswane	1	0	1
7	DF	(Romania)	27	Adrian Scarlatache	1	0	1
7	MF	(Azerbaijan)	88	Tellur Mutallimov	1	0	1
7	FW	(Georgia (country))	11	Davit Volkovi	1	0	1
7	MF	(Azerbaijan)	19	Müşfiq İlyasov	0	1	1
7	MF	(Azerbaijan)	10	Elvin Mammadov	0	1	1
7	DF	(Azerbaijan)	16	Ibrahim Aslanli	0	1	1
				TOTALS	25	5	30

=== Clean sheets ===
Place	Position	Nation	Number	Name	Premier League	Azerbaijan Cup	Total
1	GK	(Azerbaijan)	1	Orkhan Sadigli	2	3	5
				TOTALS	2	3	5

=== Disciplinary record ===
Number	Nation	Position	Name	Premier League		Azerbaijan Cup		Total	
Number	Nation	Position	Name	Yellow card	Red card	Yellow card	Red card	Yellow card	Red card
1	(Azerbaijan)	GK	Orkhan Sadigli	1	0	1	0	2	0
4	(Azerbaijan)	MF	Elvin Jamalov	6	0	1	0	7	0
6	(Peru)	DF	Álvaro Ampuero	3	0	0	0	3	0
7	(Azerbaijan)	MF	Javid Huseynov	6	1	1	0	7	1
8	(Azerbaijan)	MF	Ilkin Muradov	6	1	0	0	6	1
10	(Azerbaijan)	FW	Aghabala Ramazanov	1	1	0	0	1	1
11	(Georgia (country))	FW	Davit Volkovi	1	0	0	0	1	0
12	(Azerbaijan)	GK	Emil Balayev	1	0	0	0	1	0
14	(Azerbaijan)	DF	Bəxtiyar Həsənalızadə	4	0	0	0	4	0
16	(Azerbaijan)	DF	Ibrahim Aslanli	0	0	1	0	1	0
18	(Moldova)	MF	Gheorghe Anton	1	0	0	0	1	0
19	(Azerbaijan)	MF	Müşfiq İlyasov	0	0	1	0	1	0
23	(Botswana)	MF	Mpho Kgaswane	4	0	1	0	5	0
25	(Montenegro)	DF	Miloš Bakrač	3	0	1	0	4	0
27	(Romania)	DF	Adrian Scarlatache	8	0	0	0	8	0
28	(Montenegro)	GK	Bojan Zogović	1	0	0	0	1	0
43	(Ghana)	FW	Richard Gadze	4	0	1	0	5	0
48	(France)	MF	Chafik Tigroudja	2	0	0	0	2	0
70	(Azerbaijan)	MF	Nijat Suleymanov	4	0	0	0	4	0
88	(Azerbaijan)	MF	Tellur Mutallimov	2	0	0	0	2	0
Players who left Zira during the season:
10	(Azerbaijan)	MF	Elvin Mammadov	1	0	1	0	2	0
11	(Haiti)	FW	Sony Norde	3	0	0	0	3	0
			TOTALS	62	3	9	0	71	3
