= List of Azerbaijan football transfers summer 2018 =

This is a list of Azerbaijan football transfers in the summer transfer window, 9 June - 31 August 2018, by club. Only clubs of the 2018–19 Azerbaijan Premier League are included.

== Azerbaijan Premier League 2018-19 ==
=== Gabala ===
In: Note: Flags indicate national team as defined under FIFA eligibility rules; some limited exceptions apply. Players may hold more than one non-FIFA nationality.

No.	Pos.	Nation	Player
7	MF	AZE	Roman Huseynov (loan return from (Azerbaijan) Kapaz)
10	FW	AZE	Rauf Aliyev (Free agent)
17	FW	NGA	James Adeniyi (from (Albania) Skënderbeu Korçë)
21	MF	TOG	Lalawélé Atakora (from (Turkey) Adana Demirspor)
27	DF	AZE	Bahlul Mustafazade (loan return from (Azerbaijan) Sumgayit)
88	MF	ALB	Sabien Lilaj (from (Albania) Skënderbeu Korçë)

Out: Note: Flags indicate national team as defined under FIFA eligibility rules; some limited exceptions apply. Players may hold more than one non-FIFA nationality.

No.	Pos.	Nation	Player
6	MF	AZE	Elvin Mammadov (to (Azerbaijan) Sumgayit)
9	FW	FRA	Bagaliy Dabo (to (Azerbaijan) Neftchi Baku)
10	FW	AZE	Ruslan Qurbanov (to (Azerbaijan) Sabail)
15	DF	UKR	Vitaliy Vernydub (to (Ukraine) Zorya Luhansk)
16	DF	NED	Dion Malone (to (Netherlands) ADO Den Haag)
19	MF	CRO	Filip Ozobić (to (Azerbaijan) Qarabağ)
29	MF	AZE	Hajiagha Hajili (loan to (Azerbaijan) Qarabağ)
45	FW	MLI	Famoussa Koné (loan return to (Turkey) Göztepe)
72	FW	AZE	Kamran Guliyev (to (Lithuania) Jonava)
74	DF	AZE	Yusif Nabiyev (loan to (Azerbaijan) Sumgayit)
77	MF	AZE	Araz Abdullayev (to (Greece) Panionios, previously on loan from (Cyprus) Anorthosis)
90	FW	UKR	Ramil Hasanov (to (Turkey) 1074 Çankırıspor)
98	MF	AZE	Rovlan Muradov (loan to (Azerbaijan) Qarabağ, previously on loan from (Czech Republic) Slavia Prague)

=== Keşla ===
In: Note: Flags indicate national team as defined under FIFA eligibility rules; some limited exceptions apply. Players may hold more than one non-FIFA nationality.

No.	Pos.	Nation	Player
8	MF	SRB	Miloš Bosančić (from (Czech Republic) Slovan Liberec)
9	FW	AZE	Amil Yunanov (from (Azerbaijan) Sumgayit)
10	FW	AZE	Ruslan Nasirli (from (Azerbaijan) MOIK Baku)
11	FW	UZB	Bahodir Nasimov (from (Uzbekistan) Buxoro)
17	MF	AZE	Samir Masimov (Free agent)
19	DF	AZE	Azer Salahli (from (Azerbaijan) Sumgayit)
22	MF	SRB	Nikola Mitrović (from (Poland) Wisła Kraków)
30	GK	AZE	Davud Karimi (from (Azerbaijan) Kapaz)
93	DF	LTU	Edvinas Girdvainis (from (Israel) Hapoel Tel Aviv)
97	MF	AZE	Elnur Jafarov (from (Azerbaijan) Neftçi)
—	DF	AZE	Ruslan Amirjanov (from (Azerbaijan) Sabail)

Out: Note: Flags indicate national team as defined under FIFA eligibility rules; some limited exceptions apply. Players may hold more than one non-FIFA nationality.

No.	Pos.	Nation	Player
9	FW	AZE	Pardis Fardjad-Azad (to (Azerbaijan) Zira)
10	FW	PAR	César Meza Colli (to (Romania) Universitatea Craiova)
15	GK	AZE	Orkhan Sadigli (loan to (Azerbaijan) Sumgayit)
19	MF	ARG	Pablo Podio (loan return to (Czech Republic) Fastav Zlín)
20	MF	AZE	Agshin Guluzade (to (Azerbaijan) Zira)
22	DF	AZE	Magsad Isayev (to (Azerbaijan) Sabah)
27	DF	ROU	Adrian Scarlatache (to (Azerbaijan) Zira)
39	FW	AZE	Alibey Mammadli (to (Azerbaijan) Sabah)
40	MF	SRB	Nemanja Stojanovic (loan return to (Austria) Karabakh Wien)
77	MF	AZE	Mirsahib Abbasov (to (Azerbaijan) Zira, previously on loan)
88	MF	AZE	Rafael Maharramli (to (Azerbaijan) Qarabağ)
98	FW	AZE	Gara Garayev (to (Azerbaijan) Shuvalan)

=== Neftchi Baku ===
In: Note: Flags indicate national team as defined under FIFA eligibility rules; some limited exceptions apply. Players may hold more than one non-FIFA nationality.

No.	Pos.	Nation	Player
4	MF	AZE	Rashad Eyyubov (from (Azerbaijan) Sumgayit)
6	MF	CRO	Goran Paracki (from (New Zealand) Wellington Phoenix)
9	FW	FRA	Bagaliy Dabo (from (Azerbaijan) Gabala)
10	FW	BRA	Dário (from (Azerbaijan) Kapaz)
11	FW	GHA	Kwame Karikari (from (Qatar) Al-Arabi)
18	DF	AZE	Tural Akhundov (from (Azerbaijan) Sumgayit)
28	DF	CRO	Slavko Bralić (from (Bosnia and Herzegovina) Široki Brijeg)

Out: Note: Flags indicate national team as defined under FIFA eligibility rules; some limited exceptions apply. Players may hold more than one non-FIFA nationality.

No.	Pos.	Nation	Player
2	DF	AZE	Ilkin Qirtimov (to (Azerbaijan) Zira)
6	MF	AZE	Rashad Sadiqov (Retired)
10	MF	PAR	David Meza Colli
11	FW	CHI	Ignacio Herrera (to (South Korea) Seoul E-Land)
12	MF	COL	Mike Campaz
19	MF	PAR	Francisco García (to (Paraguay) Independiente)
51	DF	AZE	Elchin Asadov (to (Azerbaijan) Sabah)
53	GK	AZE	Maksim Vaylo (released, previously on loan from (Azerbaijan) Sabah)
97	MF	AZE	Elnur Jafarov (to (Azerbaijan) Keşla)

=== Qarabağ ===
In: Note: Flags indicate national team as defined under FIFA eligibility rules; some limited exceptions apply. Players may hold more than one non-FIFA nationality.

No.	Pos.	Nation	Player
1	GK	ISL	Hannes Halldórsson (from (Denmark) Randers)
4	DF	AZE	Rahil Mammadov (from (Azerbaijan) Sabail)
6	MF	BUL	Simeon Slavchev (from (Portugal) Sporting Lisbon)
7	FW	SUI	Innocent Emeghara (from (Cyprus) Ermis Aradippou)
9	MF	AZE	Araz Abdullayev (loan from (Greece) Panionios)
13	GK	BRA	Vagner (from (Belgium) Mouscron)
17	MF	FRA	Abdellah Zoubir (from (France) Lens)
18	MF	AZE	Ismayil Ibrahimli (from (Azerbaijan) MOIK Baku)
19	MF	CRO	Filip Ozobić (from (Azerbaijan) Gabala)
21	MF	AZE	Hajiagha Hajili (loan from (Azerbaijan) Gabala)
22	MF	AZE	Rovlan Muradov (loan from (Azerbaijan) Gabala)
28	FW	CGO	Dzon Delarge (from (Turkey) Bursaspor)
88	MF	AZE	Rafael Maharramli (from (Azerbaijan) Keşla)

Out: Note: Flags indicate national team as defined under FIFA eligibility rules; some limited exceptions apply. Players may hold more than one non-FIFA nationality.

No.	Pos.	Nation	Player
1	GK	UKR	Anton Kanibolotskiy (to (Poland) Miedź Legnica)
7	MF	AZE	Rahid Amirguliyev (to (Azerbaijan) Sabail)
10	FW	BRA	Pedro Henrique (loan return to (Greece) PAOK)
13	GK	BIH	Ibrahim Šehić (to (Turkey) Erzurumspor)
17	MF	AZE	Elchin Rahimli (to (Azerbaijan) Sabail)
20	MF	AZE	Richard Almeida (to (Kazakhstan) Astana)
21	DF	AZE	Arif Dashdemirov (to (Azerbaijan) Sumgayit)
22	MF	AZE	Afran Ismayilov (to (Azerbaijan) Sumgayit)
32	DF	AZE	Elvin Yunuszade
33	MF	AZE	Eltun Turabov (to (Azerbaijan) Sabah, previously on loan from (Azerbaijan) Khazar Baku)
44	FW	AZE	Aghabala Ramazanov (to (Azerbaijan) Sabail)
88	MF	AZE	Elshan Abdullayev (to (Azerbaijan) Sabah, previously on loan from (Azerbaijan) Zira)
90	FW	AZE	Ramil Sheydayev (loan return to (Turkey) Trabzonspor)

=== Sabah ===
In: Note: Flags indicate national team as defined under FIFA eligibility rules; some limited exceptions apply. Players may hold more than one non-FIFA nationality.

No.	Pos.	Nation	Player
1	GK	AZE	Tarlan Ahmadli (from (Azerbaijan) Khazar Baku)
3	DF	AZE	Elvin Badalov (from (Austria) Karabakh Wien)
4	MF	AZE	Tarzin Jahangirov (from (Azerbaijan) Kapaz)
5	DF	AZE	Karim Diniyev (from (Azerbaijan) Sabail)
6	MF	AZE	Vadim Abdullayev (from (Azerbaijan) Khazar Baku)
7	MF	UKR	Vitaliy Kvashuk (from (Belarus) Neman Grodno)
8	MF	AZE	Elshan Abdullayev (from (Azerbaijan) Qarabağ)
9	FW	UKR	Marko Dević (from (Liechtenstein) Vaduz)
10	MF	AZE	Javid Imamverdiyev (from (Azerbaijan) Sumgayit)
11	FW	AZE	Elgun Nabiyev (from (Azerbaijan) Zira)
13	DF	SRB	Filip Ivanović (from (Serbia) Radnik Surdulica)
14	FW	AZE	Tural Gurbatov (from (Azerbaijan) Khazar Baku)
15	MF	PAR	Éric Ramos (from (Paraguay) General Díaz)
19	DF	AZE	Magsad Isayev (from (Azerbaijan) Keşla)
21	DF	AZE	Novruz Mammadov (from (Azerbaijan) Khazar Baku)
25	DF	BRA	Wanderson (from (Israel) Bnei Sakhnin)
27	MF	AZE	Bakhtiyar Soltanov (from (Azerbaijan) Khazar Baku)
30	GK	SRB	Saša Stamenković (Free agent)
33	MF	AZE	Eltun Turabov (from (Azerbaijan) Qarabağ)
39	FW	AZE	Alibey Mammadli (from (Azerbaijan) Keşla)
88	DF	AZE	Elchin Asadov (from (Azerbaijan) Neftchi Baku)
96	GK	AZE	Aydin Bayramov (from (Azerbaijan) MOIK Baku)

Out: Note: Flags indicate national team as defined under FIFA eligibility rules; some limited exceptions apply. Players may hold more than one non-FIFA nationality.

No.	Pos.	Nation	Player
3	DF	AZE	Shirmammad Mammadov
4	DF	AZE	Ali Aliyev (to (Azerbaijan) Sumgayit)
6	MF	AZE	Seymur Asadov (loan return to (Azerbaijan) Sabail)
7	MF	AZE	Emin Mehtiyev (loan return to (Azerbaijan) Sabail)
9	FW	AZE	Raul Yagubzade (loan return to (Azerbaijan) Sabail)
10	MF	AZE	Mahammad Aliyev (to (Azerbaijan) Sumgayit)
11	MF	AZE	Bayram Nuruzade
14	MF	AZE	Ilgar Alakbarov (to (Azerbaijan) MOIK Baku)
15	DF	AZE	Elshad Manafov (to (Azerbaijan) Qaradağ Lökbatan)
17	DF	AZE	Eltun Huseynov
19	FW	AZE	Murad Ismayilzade (to (Azerbaijan) Turan-Tovuz)
22	MF	UKR	Vladlen Normaniya
23	MF	AZE	Gvanzav Mahammadov (to (Azerbaijan) Sumgayit)
25	GK	AZE	Royal Alizade
27	FW	AZE	Magomed Kurbanov
44	FW	MDA	Artiom Zabun
53	GK	AZE	Maksim Vaylo (loan return to (Azerbaijan) Neftçi)
55	MF	AZE	Aziz Guliyev
93	MF	CRO	Josip Balić
94	GK	AZE	Ruzi Giyasli

=== Sabail ===
In: Note: Flags indicate national team as defined under FIFA eligibility rules; some limited exceptions apply. Players may hold more than one non-FIFA nationality.

No.	Pos.	Nation	Player
4	DF	BRA	Henrique Moura (from (Costa Rica) Deportivo Saprissa)
5	MF	AZE	Vugar Beybalayev (from (Azerbaijan) Sumgayit)
8	MF	MDA	Eugeniu Cociuc (from (Slovakia) Žilina)
10	FW	AZE	Aghabala Ramazanov (from (Azerbaijan) Qarabağ)
11	FW	AZE	Ruslan Qurbanov (from (Azerbaijan) Gabala)
13	DF	AZE	Shahriyar Rahimov (from (Azerbaijan) Kapaz)
14	MF	AZE	Rahid Amirguliyev (from (Azerbaijan) Qarabağ)
16	DF	UKR	Ihor Korotetskyi (from (Azerbaijan) Kapaz)
17	MF	AZE	Elchin Rahimli (from (Azerbaijan) Qarabağ)
22	MF	MEX	Édgar Pacheco (from (Cyprus) Ermis Aradippou)
27	MF	BUL	Emil Martinov (from (Bulgaria) Slavia Sofia)
28	FW	CGO	Kévin Koubemba (from (France) Bourg-en-Bresse)
33	DF	MKD	Tome Kitanovski (from (Croatia) Slaven Belupo)

Out: Note: Flags indicate national team as defined under FIFA eligibility rules; some limited exceptions apply. Players may hold more than one non-FIFA nationality.

No.	Pos.	Nation	Player
4	DF	AZE	Rahil Mammadov (to (Azerbaijan) Qarabağ)
5	DF	AZE	Karim Diniyev (to (Azerbaijan) Sabah)
6	MF	AZE	Murad Agayev
7	MF	AZE	Emin Mehtiyev (to (Azerbaijan) Qaradağ Lökbatan, previously on loan from (Azerbaijan) Sabah)
8	MF	AZE	Agshin Mukhtaroglu
9	FW	AZE	Raul Yagubzade (to (Azerbaijan) MOIK Baku, previously on loan from (Azerbaijan) Sabah)
10	FW	AZE	Nurlan Novruzov (to (Turkey) Dersim 62 Spor)
11	MF	TKM	Elman Tagayev
13	MF	UGA	Farouk Miya (loan return to (Belgium) Standard Liège)
15	DF	GEO	Nika Apakidze
17	FW	AZE	Vüqar Nadirov
19	MF	AZE	Orkhan Aliyev
23	DF	CUW	Ayrton Statie
24	DF	AZE	Ruslan Amirjanov (to (Azerbaijan) Keşla)
66	MF	AZE	Parviz Garakhanov
92	FW	TKM	Wahyt Orazsähedow (to (Turkmenistan) Altyn Asyr)
—	MF	AZE	Seymur Asadov (released, previously on loan from (Azerbaijan) Sabah)

=== Sumgayit ===
In: Note: Flags indicate national team as defined under FIFA eligibility rules; some limited exceptions apply. Players may hold more than one non-FIFA nationality.

No.	Pos.	Nation	Player
4	DF	AZE	Shahriyar Aliyev (from (Azerbaijan) Kapaz)
10	MF	AZE	Aleksey Isayev (from (Russia) Zenit St. Petersburg)
11	FW	TUR	Atilla Yildirim (from (Netherlands) Maastricht)
15	GK	AZE	Orkhan Sadigli (loan from (Azerbaijan) Keşla)
21	DF	AZE	Arif Dashdemirov (from (Azerbaijan) Qarabağ)
22	MF	AZE	Afran Ismayilov (from (Azerbaijan) Qarabağ)
44	MF	AZE	Gvanzav Mahammadov (from (Azerbaijan) Sabah)
60	MF	AZE	Elvin Mammadov (from (Azerbaijan) Gabala)
74	DF	AZE	Yusif Nabiyev (loan from (Azerbaijan) Gabala)
77	MF	AZE	Murad Khachayev (loan from (Ukraine) Shakhtar Donetsk)
99	MF	ISR	Eli Babayev (from (Israel) Hapoel Ra'anana)

Out: Note: Flags indicate national team as defined under FIFA eligibility rules; some limited exceptions apply. Players may hold more than one non-FIFA nationality.

No.	Pos.	Nation	Player
1	GK	AZE	Farhad Valiyev (retired)
5	MF	AZE	Vugar Beybalayev (to (Azerbaijan) Sabail)
6	MF	AZE	Kamal Mirzayev (to (Azerbaijan) Zira)
9	FW	AZE	Amil Yunanov (to (Azerbaijan) Keşla)
10	MF	AZE	Javid Imamverdiyev (to (Azerbaijan) Sabah)
13	DF	AZE	Bahlul Mustafazade (loan return to (Azerbaijan) Gabala)
18	DF	AZE	Tural Akhundov (to (Azerbaijan) Neftchi Baku)
19	DF	AZE	Azer Salahli (to (Azerbaijan) Keşla)
32	MF	AZE	Rashad Eyyubov (to (Azerbaijan) Neftchi Baku)
33	DF	AZE	Dmitri Naghiyev (to (Portugal) Cova da Piedade)
77	MF	AZE	Elnur Abdullayev

=== Zira ===
In: Note: Flags indicate national team as defined under FIFA eligibility rules; some limited exceptions apply. Players may hold more than one non-FIFA nationality.

No.	Pos.	Nation	Player
2	DF	AZE	Ilkin Qirtimov (from (Azerbaijan) Neftchi Baku)
3	MF	AZE	Budag Nasirov (loan from (Portugal) Sporting Lisbon)
7	FW	AZE	Pardis Fardjad-Azad (from (Azerbaijan) Keşla)
8	MF	AZE	Kamal Mirzayev (from (Azerbaijan) Sumgayit)
11	MF	FRA	Dylan Duventru (from (Cyprus) Alki Oroklini)
13	DF	AZE	Murad Musayev (from (Azerbaijan) Shuvalan)
26	DF	SRB	Miloš Radivojević (from (Israel) Ironi Kiryat Shmona)
77	MF	AZE	Mirsahib Abbasov (from (Azerbaijan) Keşla)
91	MF	ALG	Bilal Hamdi (from (Cyprus) Alki Oroklini)
98	MF	AZE	Agshin Guluzade (from (Azerbaijan) Keşla)
—	DF	ROU	Adrian Scarlatache (from (Azerbaijan) Keşla)

Out: Note: Flags indicate national team as defined under FIFA eligibility rules; some limited exceptions apply. Players may hold more than one non-FIFA nationality.

No.	Pos.	Nation	Player
3	DF	CMR	Joseph Boum
8	MF	SRB	Milan Đurić (to (Serbia) Vojvodina)
10	FW	AZE	Orkhan Aliyev (to (Azerbaijan) Sabail)
11	MF	NGA	Victor Igbekoyi (to (United States) North Carolina)
13	DF	AZE	Aleksandr Shemonayev
18	DF	MKD	Yani Urdinov (loan return to (Czech Republic) Bohemians)
19	FW	AZE	Elgun Nabiyev (to (Azerbaijan) Sabah)
23	DF	SRB	Jovan Krneta (to (Greece) Levadiakos)
29	FW	TRI	Jomal Williams (loan return to (Trinidad and Tobago) W Connection)
43	FW	GHA	Richard Gadze (to (Romania) Voluntari)
88	MF	AZE	Elshan Abdullayev (loan return to (Azerbaijan) Qarabağ)
