= Shahin Zakiyev =

Azerbaijani footballer (born 1999)

Personal information
- Full name: Shahin Azer oglu Zakiyev
- Date of birth: 11 June 1999 (age 27)
- Place of birth: Azerbaijan
- Height: 1.88 m (6 ft 2 in)
- Position: Goalkeeper

Team information
- Current team: Baku Sporting

Youth career
- Keşla

Senior career*
Years	Team	Apps	(Gls)
2017–2019	Keşla	2	(0)
2020–2022	Sabail	0	(0)
2023–2024	Araz-Naxçıvan		
2023–2024	→ Karvan (loan)		
2024–	Baku Sporting		

International career^{‡}
2019	Azerbaijan U21	1	(0)
- * Club domestic league appearances and goals as of 22 August 2021 ‡ National team caps and goals as of 21 September 2020

Shahin Zakiyev (Azerbaijani: Şahin Zəkiyev; born on 11 June 1999) is an Azerbaijani football goalkeeper who plays for Baku Sporting.

== Club career ==
On 18 April 2019, Zakiyev made his debut in the Azerbaijan Premier League for Keşla match against Qarabağ.
