= Julio Rodríguez (footballer, born 1990) =

Paraguayan footballer

Personal information
- Full name: Julio César Rodríguez Giménez
- Date of birth: 5 December 1990 (age 35)
- Place of birth: Asunción, Paraguay
- Height: 1.83 m (6 ft 0 in)
- Position: Centre-forward

Team information
- Current team: Guillermo Brown

Youth career
- Defensa y Justicia

Senior career*
Years	Team	Apps	(Gls)
2010–2013	Defensa y Justicia	24	(9)
2011–2012	→ Berazategui (loan)	25	(3)
2013–2017	Dorados de Sinaloa	16	(2)
2013	→ Tijuana (loan)	0	(0)
2014	→ Godoy Cruz (loan)	16	(3)
2014–2015	→ Defensa y Justicia (loan)	32	(6)
2016	→ Unión Santa Fe (loan)	10	(1)
2016–2017	→ Arsenal de Sarandí (loan)	17	(1)
2017	→ Almagro (loan)	0	(0)
2018	Deportivo Capiatá	25	(4)
2019	Zira	23	(12)
2020–2022	Sabah	45	(6)
2023–	Guillermo Brown	30	(3)
- * Club domestic league appearances and goals as of 11:49, 10 October 2023 (UTC)

Julio César Rodríguez Giménez (born 5 December 1990) is a Paraguayan professional footballer who plays as a centre-forward for Guillermo Brown.

== Career ==
Rodríguez's first taste of senior football came in October 2010 as he was selected on the bench by Defensa y Justicia for a match against Tiro Federal in Primera B Nacional, he didn't make an appearance for the club until after his loan move to Primera C Metropolitana side Berazategui. He scored three goals in twenty-five games for Berazategui before making his Defensa y Justicia debut on 13 October 2012 in a defeat to Instituto. He went onto make twenty-four league appearances in 2012–13 for Defensa y Justicia before leaving the club and Argentine football to join Ascenso MX side Dorados de Sinaloa in 2013.

Two goals in sixteen appearances followed, during which time Rodríguez spent time with Dorados' senior affiliate Liga MX team Tijuana on loan. He made just one appearance for Tijuana in a 6–0 home win over Honduran side Victoria in the 2013–14 CONCACAF Champions League. In 2014, he completed a loan move to Argentine Primera División side Godoy Cruz. Sixteen games and three goals followed for him at Godoy. After his time in Mendoza, Rodríguez rejoined Defensa y Justicia on loan and subsequently scored six times in thirty-two matches in two seasons in Argentina's top tier for them.

2016 saw Rodríguez make temporary moves to Unión Santa Fe and Arsenal de Sarandí. A year later, in August 2017, Rodríguez joined Primera B Nacional side Almagro. However, he soon returned to Dorados after contractual disagreements. In January 2018, Rodríguez signed for Paraguayan Primera División team Deportivo Capiatá. He scored on his debut for the club, netting the opening goal in a win over Deportivo Santaní on 25 February. He departed the end of 2018, scoring four times across twenty-five fixtures. In January 2019, Rodríguez went to Azerbaijan to sign with top-flight Zira.

Following nine goals in fourteen games in his first seven months, Rodríguez renewed his contract with Zira on 20 June 2019. On 29 January 2020, Rodríguez signed a contract with fellow Azerbaijani team Sabah on a season-long deal. His first appearance for Sabah came on 1 February against former club Zira. In the succeeding September, Rodríguez scored his first goal for Sabah - again, against Zira.

== Career statistics ==
As of match played 15 May 2022.

Club statistics
Club	Season	League			Cup		Continental		Other		Total	
Club	Season	Division	Apps	Goals	Apps	Goals	Apps	Goals	Apps	Goals	Apps	Goals
Defensa y Justicia	2010–11	Primera B Nacional	0	0	0	0	—		0	0	0	0
Defensa y Justicia	2011–12	Primera B Nacional	0	0	0	0	—		0	0	0	0
Defensa y Justicia	2012–13	Primera B Nacional	24	9	2	0	—		0	0	26	9
Defensa y Justicia	Total		24	9	2	0	—		0	0	26	9
Berazategui (loan)	2010–11	Primera C Metropolitana	25	3	0	0	—		0	0	25	3
Dorados de Sinaloa	2013–14	Ascenso MX	16	2	4	0	—		0	0	20	2
Dorados de Sinaloa	2014–15	Ascenso MX	0	0	0	0	—		0	0	0	0
Dorados de Sinaloa	2015–16	Liga MX	0	0	0	0	—		0	0	0	0
Dorados de Sinaloa	2016–17	Ascenso MX	0	0	0	0	—		0	0	0	0
Dorados de Sinaloa	2017–18	Ascenso MX	0	0	0	0	—		0	0	0	0
Dorados de Sinaloa	Total		16	2	4	0	—		0	0	20	2
Tijuana (loan)	2013–14	Liga MX	0	0	0	0	1 (Note: Appearance(s) in the CONCACAF Champions League)	0	0	0	1	0
Godoy Cruz (loan)	2013–14	Argentine Primera División	16	3	0	0	—		0	0	16	3
Defensa y Justicia (loan)	2014	Argentine Primera División	8	3	2	1	—		0	0	10	4
Defensa y Justicia (loan)	2015	Argentine Primera División	24	3	4	0	—		0	0	28	3
Defensa y Justicia (loan)	Total		32	6	6	0	—		0	0	38	7
Unión Santa Fe (loan)	2016	Argentine Primera División	10	1	1	0	—		0	0	11	1
Arsenal de Sarandí (loan)	2016–17	Argentine Primera División	17	1	2	0	0	0	0	0	19	1
Almagro (loan)	2017–18	Primera B Nacional	0	0	0	0	—		0	0	0	0
Deportivo Capiatá	2018	Paraguayan Primera División	25	4	0	0	—		0	0	25	4
Zira	2018–19	Premier League	12	8	2	1	—		0	0	14	9
Zira	2019–20	Premier League	11	4	3	2	—		0	0	14	6
Zira	Total		23	12	5	3	—		0	0	28	15
Sabah	2019–20	Premier League	6	0	0	0	—		0	0	6	0
Sabah	2020–21	Premier League	25	3	1	0	—		0	0	26	3
Sabah	2021–22	Premier League	14	3	2	0	—		—		16	3
Sabah	Total		45	6	3	0	—		0	0	48	6
Career total			233	47	23	4	1	0	0	0	257	51
