= Budag Nasirov =

Azerbaijani footballer (born 1996)

Personal information
- Full name: Budag Hikmat oglu Nasirov
- Date of birth: 15 July 1996 (age 30)
- Place of birth: Ganja, Azerbaijan
- Height: 1.73 m (5 ft 8 in)
- Position: Midfielder

Team information
- Current team: Naftalan

Youth career
- Turan Tovuz

Senior career*
Years	Team	Apps	(Gls)
2011–2013	Turan	15	(0)
2014	Araz-Naxçıvan	6	(0)
2014–2016	Sumgayit	11	(0)
2015–2016	→ Kapaz (loan)	33	(1)
2016–2019	Sporting B	30	(1)
2018–2019	→ Zira (loan)	12	(0)
2023–2024	Turan Tovuz	2	(0)
2024	Karvan	0	(0)
2024	Naftalan	0	(0)

International career^{‡}
2012–2013	Azerbaijan U17	1	(0)
2013–2015	Azerbaijan U19	9	(2)
2015	Azerbaijan U21	10	(0)
2016	Azerbaijan	1	(0)
- * Club domestic league appearances and goals as of 11 July 2023 ‡ National team caps and goals as of 11 September 2018

Budag Nasirov (Azerbaijani: Budaq Nəsirov); born 15 July 1996) is an Azerbaijani football midfielder.

== Career ==
=== Club ===
On 25 July 2016, Nasirov signed a contract with Sporting CP, which can be extended to a five-year term.

Nasirov made his LigaPro debut for Sporting B on 20 August 2016 against Fafe. He scored his first goal for Sporting B in the LigaPro match against Olhanense in a 2–2 home draw on 29 October 2016.

On 10 August 2018, Zira announced the signing of Nasirov on a season-long loan deal.

On 10 July 2023, Turan Tovuz announced the signing of Nasirov to a three-year contract.

In November 2024, it was reported that he joined Naftalan FK competing in the Azerbaijan Regional League.

=== International ===
On 26 May 2016 Nasirov made his senior international debut for Azerbaijan in a friendly match against Andorra.

== Career statistics ==
=== International ===
Azerbaijan
Year	Apps	Goals
2016	1	0
Total	1	0

Statistics accurate as of match played 26 May 2016
