= Robin Ngalande =

Malawian footballer

Personal information
- Full name: Robin Ngalande Junior
- Date of birth: 2 November 1992 (age 34)
- Place of birth: Dedza, Malawi
- Height: 1.70 m (5 ft 7 in)
- Position: Striker

Team information
- Current team: Mighty Wanderers

Youth career
- Civo United
- 2009–2010: Mamelodi Sundowns

Senior career*
Years	Team	Apps	(Gls)
2010–2012	Atlético Madrid C		
2012–2016	Bidvest Wits	14	(3)
2014–2015	→ Ajax Cape Town (loan)	12	(0)
2015–2016	→ Platinum Stars (loan)	2	(0)
2017	Masters Security		
2017–2018	Baroka	21	(3)
2019–2020	Zira	11	(1)
2020–2022	Saint George	10	(1)
2022–	Mighty Wanderers		

International career^{‡}
- Malawi U17
2012–	Malawi	44	(1)
- * Club domestic league appearances and goals as of 18:27, 24 September 2023 (UTC) ‡ National team caps and goals as of 18:25, 24 September 2023 (UTC)

Robin Ngalande Junior (born 2 November 1992) is a Malawian footballer who plays as a striker for Mighty Wanderers.

== Club career ==
Born in Dedza, Ngalande began his career with Civo United. He later joined the youth team of Spanish club Atlético Madrid in September 2010, joining from the youth ranks of South African club Mamelodi Sundowns. Ngalande had been offered contracts by sixteen other European clubs.

Ngalande returned to South Africa in 2012 signing a two-year contract with Bidvest Wits.

On 10 July 2014, Ngalande signed a season-long loan deal with Ajax Cape Town. In July 2015 he moved on loan again, this time to Platinum Stars. In December 2015 his performances for the club were criticised. After returning from his loan at the end of the season, he was said to be considering his options.

Ngalande was released by Bidvest in September 2016. After a spell with Masters Security, he signed for Baroka in July 2017, but terminated his contract with them in May 2018.

In January 2019 Ngalande signed for Azerbaijani club Zira.

On 10 June 2019, Ngalande signed a new two-year contract with Zira. On 27 January 2020, Ngalande was released by Zira.

He signed for Ethiopian club Saint George for the 2020–21 season. After his two-year contract expired, he returned to Malawi, signing for Mighty Wanderers in September 2022.

== International career ==
He made his senior international debut for Malawi in 2012. At the youth level he played in the 2009 African U-17 Championship, scoring a brace in their 5–0 win over Zimbabwe national under-17 football team.
