= Javid Huseynov =

Azerbaijani footballer (born 1988)

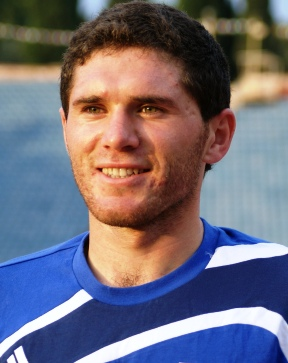

Personal information
- Full name: Javid Shakir oglu Huseynov
- Date of birth: 9 March 1988 (age 38)
- Place of birth: Jabrayil, Soviet Union
- Height: 1.78 m (5 ft 10 in)
- Position: Midfielder

Senior career*
Years	Team	Apps	(Gls)
2005–2007	Turan Tovuz	29	(5)
2005	→ MOIK Baki	5	(0)
2007	Olimpik Baku	3	(0)
2008–2009	Inter Baku	23	(3)
2010–2012	Neftchi Baku	64	(4)
2012–2013	Adana Demirspor	12	(0)
2013–2014	Baku	38	(8)
2014–2015	Gabala	31	(12)
2016–2019	Gabala	58	(4)
2019–2020	Zira	16	(2)
2020–2021	Gabala	20	(0)

International career
2008–2019	Azerbaijan	58	(2)

Managerial career
- 2021–2022: Jabrayil
- 2022–2023: Shamakhi (assistant)
- 2023–2024: Jabrayil
- 2024: Turan Tovuz (assistant)
- 2024–2025: Sabail
- * Club domestic league appearances and goals

Javid Huseynov (Azerbaijani: Cavid Hüseynov; born 9 March 1988) is an Azerbaijani football manager and former player.

== Career ==
Huseynov was born in Jabrayil, Soviet Union.

During the summer of 2012, Huseynov moved to TFF First League side Adana Demirspor, signing a two-year contract.

On 5 July 2014, Huseynov signed a one-year contract with Gabala.

Following Huseynov's release from jail, he re-signed with Gabala on 17 October 2016, until the end of the 2016–17 season.

On 1 June 2019, Huseynov left Gabala by mutual consent, signing a two-year contract with Zira FK the same day.

Huseynov was released by Gabala on 11 June 2021.

In 2021, Javid Huseynov founded the football club Jabrayil. Currently, the club competes in the Azerbaijan First League.

=== Managerial career ===
After ending his football career, Huseynov began his coaching career. He worked as an assistant coach at the Azerbaijan Premier League side Turan Tovuz in 2024. On November 11, 2024, his contract with the club was terminated by mutual agreement, and on the same day, he was appointed as the head coach of Sabail.

On March 16, 2025, at the press conference held after the Azerbaijan Premier League match, in which Sabail lost 1–2 to Neftçi, Javid Huseynov sharply criticized the club's management. A few hours after this criticism, the club announced Huseynov's dismissal.

== Murder of Rasim Aliyev ==
In 2015, when Gabala won a qualifier to the Europa League against the Greek-Cypriot team Apollon Limassol, Huseynov raised the Turkish flag, which was a provocative gesture towards the Greek-Cypriotic fans and made an obscene gesture at a journalist who questioned the act. An Azerbajaini journalist, Rasim Aliyev, reported on the incident and harshly criticized Huseynov as “ignorant and unable to behave himself”. Aliyev was subsequently murdered. On 31 May 2016, the court found him Huseynov guilty of accessory to the murder after the fact and not reporting a crime and sentenced to four years of imprisonment.

== Career statistics ==
=== Club ===
As of match played 19 May 2021

Appearances and goals by club, season and competition
Club	Season	League			National Cup		Continental		Other		Total	
Club	Season	Division	Apps	Goals	Apps	Goals	Apps	Goals	Apps	Goals	Apps	Goals
Turan-Tovuz	2004–05	Azerbaijan Premier League	2	0			-		-		2	0
Turan-Tovuz	2005–06	Azerbaijan Premier League	8	2			-		-		8	2
Turan-Tovuz	2006–07	Azerbaijan Premier League	19	5			-		-		19	5
Turan-Tovuz	Total		29	7			-	-	-	-	29	7
MOIK Baku (loan)	2005–06	Azerbaijan Premier League	5	0			-		-		5	0
Olimpik Baku	2007–08	Azerbaijan Premier League	3	0			-		-		3	0
Inter Baku	2007–08	Azerbaijan Premier League	6	1			-		-		6	1
Inter Baku	2008–09	Azerbaijan Premier League	13	2			4	0	-		17	2
Inter Baku	2009–10	Azerbaijan Premier League	4	0			2	0	-		6	0
Inter Baku	Total		23	3			6	0	-	-	29	3
Neftchi Baku	2009–10	Azerbaijan Premier League	11	1			-		-		11	1
Neftchi Baku	2010–11	Azerbaijan Premier League	27	2	3	1	-		-		30	3
Neftchi Baku	2011–12	Azerbaijan Premier League	26	1	5	1	2	0	-		33	2
Neftchi Baku	Total		64	4	8	2	2	0	-	-	74	6
Adana Demirspor	2012–13	TFF First League	12	0	1	0	-		-		13	0
Baku	2012–13	Azerbaijan Premier League	12	2	3	0	-		-		15	2
Baku	2013–14	Azerbaijan Premier League	26	6	3	1	-		-		29	7
Baku	Total		38	8	6	1	-	-	-	-	44	9
Gabala	2014–15	Azerbaijan Premier League	31	12	3	0	0	0	-		34	12
Gabala	2015–16	Azerbaijan Premier League	0	0	0	0	6	3	-		6	3
Gabala	2016–17	Azerbaijan Premier League	16	0	6	0	0	0	-		22	0
Gabala	2017–18	Azerbaijan Premier League	18	3	5	2	4	0	-		27	5
Gabala	2018–19	Azerbaijan Premier League	24	0	5	0	1	0	-		30	0
Gabala	Total		89	15	19	2	11	3	-	-	119	20
Zira	2019–20	Azerbaijan Premier League	16	2	1	0	-		-		17	2
Gabala	2020–21	Azerbaijan Premier League	20	0	1	0	-		-		21	0
Career total			299	39	36	5	19	3	0	0	354	48

=== International ===
As of match played 12 June 2015

Azerbaijan national team
Year	Apps	Goals
2008	8	0
2009	9	0
2010	4	0
2011	4	0
2012	4	1
2013	7	0
2014	5	0
2015	3	1
Total	44	2

=== International goals ===
#	Date	Venue	Opponent	Scored	Result	Competition	Ref.
1.	15 August 2012	Baku, Azerbaijan	Bahrain	3	3–0	Friendly	
2.	28 March 2015	Baku, Azerbaijan	Malta	1	2–0	UEFA Euro 2016 Qualifying	

== Honours ==
Neftchi Baku

- Azerbaijan Premier League (2): 2010–11, 2011–12

Gabala

- Azerbaijan Cup: 2018–19
