= Zira Olympic Sport Complex Stadium =

Stadium in Baku, Azerbaijan

Coordinates: 40.35892°N 50.29311°E

Zira Stadium
- Interactive map of Zira Stadium
- Address: Azerbaijan
- Location: Zirə, Azerbaijan
- Owner: AFFA
- Capacity: 1,500
- Surface: Grass
- Scoreboard: yes

Tenant
- Zira FK

Zira Stadium, also known as Zira Olympic Sport Complex Stadium is a football stadium in Zirə, Azerbaijan.
