= Miloš Radivojević (footballer) =

Serbian footballer

Miloš Radivojević Милош Радивојевић
Personal information
- Date of birth: 5 April 1990 (age 36)
- Place of birth: Belgrade, SR Serbia, SFR Yugoslavia
- Height: 1.84 m (6 ft 1/2 in)
- Position: Left-back

Team information
- Current team: Inđija
- Number: 5

Senior career*
| Years | Team | Apps | (Gls) |
| 2006–2012 | Sinđelić Beograd | 117 | (17) |
| 2013 | BSK Borča | 5 | (0) |
| 2013–2014 | Sinđelić Beograd | 27 | (0) |
| 2014 | Inđija | 15 | (0) |
| 2015–2016 | Voždovac | 34 | (1) |
| 2016 | Radnički Niš | 15 | (0) |
| 2017 | Rad | 16 | (0) |
| 2017–2018 | Ironi Kiryat Shmona | 16 | (1) |
| 2018–2019 | Zira | 19 | (1) |
| 2019–2021 | Slaven Belupo | 9 | (1) |
| 2021–2022 | Rad | 59 | (3) |
| 2022–2023 | Novi Sad 1921 | 31 | (0) |
| 2023–2024 | Smederevo 1924 | 16 | (0) |
| 2024 | Kabel | | |
| 2025 | Mladenovac | | |
| 2025- | Inđija | | |
- * Club domestic league appearances and goals as of 26 December 2023

Miloš Radivojević (Serbian Cyrillic: Милош Радивојевић; born 5 April 1990) is a Serbian football defender who plays for Inđija.
