= Orkhan Sadigli =

Azerbaijani footballer (born 1993)

Personal information
- Full name: Orkhan Mehdi oglu Sadigli
- Date of birth: 19 March 1993 (age 33)
- Place of birth: Jalilabad, Azerbaijan
- Height: 1.83 m (6 ft 0 in)
- Position: Goalkeeper

Team information
- Current team: Sumgayit
- Number: 15

Senior career*
Years	Team	Apps	(Gls)
2012–2016	Khazar Lankaran	89	(0)
2016–2018	Keşla	27	(0)
2018	→ Sumgayit (loan)	2	(0)
2019–2020	Zira	13	(0)
2022–2023	Kapaz	22	(0)
2023–	Sumgayit	2	(0)

International career^{‡}
2011	Azerbaijan U19	3	(0)
2013	Azerbaijan U21	1	(0)
- * Club domestic league appearances and goals as of 24 October 2023 ‡ National team caps and goals as of 23 September 2020

Orkhan Sadigli (Azerbaijani: Orxan Sadıqlı; born on 19 March, 1993) is an Azerbaijani professional footballer who plays as a goalkeeper for Sumgayit in the Azerbaijan Premier League.

== Club career ==
On 5 August 2012, Sadigli made his debut in the Azerbaijan Premier League for Khazar Lankaran with a match against Ravan Baku.
