= Kamal Mirzayev =

Azerbaijani footballer (born 1994)

Personal information
- Full name: Kəmal Mirzayev
- Date of birth: 14 September 1994 (age 32)
- Place of birth: Ujar, Azerbaijan
- Height: 1.81 m (5 ft 11 in)
- Position: Midfielder

Team information
- Current team: Shamakhi
- Number: 8

Senior career*
Years	Team	Apps	(Gls)
2010–2014	Gabala	5	(0)
2015–2017	Shuvalan	44	(1)
2017–2018	Sumgayit	18	(0)
2018–2019	Zira	13	(0)
2019	Gabala	0	(0)
2019–2020	Al-Salmiya	8	(1)
2020–2022	Gabala	9	(0)
2022–	Shamakhi	14	(0)

International career^{‡}
2012	Azerbaijan U19	2	(0)
2016	Azerbaijan U21	1	(0)
- * Club domestic league appearances and goals as of 15 December 2022 ‡ National team caps and goals as of 21 September 2020

Kamal Mirzayev (Azerbaijani: Kəmal Mirzayev; born on 14 September 1994) is an Azerbaijani professional footballer who plays as a midfielder for Shamakhi.

== Club career ==
On 28 April 2013, Mirzayev made his debut in the Azerbaijan Premier League for Gabala match against Qarabağ.

On 23 August 2019, Mirzayev signed one-year contract with Al-Salmiya SC.

On 11 July 2022, Gabala announced the departure of Mirzayev.
