= Dylan Duventru =

French footballer (born 1989)

Personal information
- Full name: Dylan Ludovic Duventru-Huret
- Date of birth: 3 January 1989 (age 37)
- Place of birth: Troyes, France
- Height: 1.85 m (6 ft 1 in)
- Position: Winger

Team information
- Current team: Nea Salamina
- Number: 14

Youth career
- 1998–2002: CFF Paris
- 2002–2009: Sochaux

Senior career*
| Years | Team | Apps | (Gls) |
| 2009–2011 | Marítimo | 2 | (0) |
| 2012–2013 | Compiègne | 23 | (3) |
| 2013–2016 | FC Mantes | 61 | (7) |
| 2016–2018 | Alki Oroklini | 57 | (11) |
| 2018–2019 | Zira | 20 | (1) |
| 2019 | Sabail | 0 | (0) |
| 2019–2020 | Olympiakos Nicosia | 20 | (4) |
| 2020– | Nea Salamina | 18 | (0) |

International career
| 2007 | France U18 | 2 | (1) |
| 2007–2008 | France U19 | 6 | (2) |
- * Club domestic league appearances and goals

Dylan Ludovic Duventru-Huret (born 3 January 1989), commonly known simply as Dylan in Portugal, is a French professional footballer who plays for Nea Salamina. He primarily plays as an attacking midfielder and a winger.

He is a former French youth international, having represented his country at under-18 and under-19 level. He joined Marítimo ahead of the 2009–10 season, after spending eight years at his former club Sochaux in France.

== Career ==
Duventru began his football career playing for the Centre de Formation de Paris, a local Parisian youth sporting club designed to cater only to footballers under the age of 19. While at the club, he played alongside his elder brother, Willy. Duventru spent four years at the club, before securing a move to professional club Sochaux in Franche-Comté. While in the club's academy, he played on the under-19 team that won the Coupe Gambardella in 2007. During the 2007–08 season, Duventru began appearing on the club's Championnat de France amateur team in the reserves, making five appearances. The following season, he made 21 appearances netting three goals.

In 2009, Duventru signed with Portuguese Liga club Marítimo. He departed Sochaux without making a professional appearance for the club. He, initially, started with the club's B team in the Terceira Divisão, however, later in the season, he was called up to the senior team and made his professional debut in a league match against Vitória de Setúbal.

On 12 July 2018, Duventru signed a one-year contract with Zira FK.

On 15 June 2019, Duventru signed a contract with Sabail FK.

On 7 August 2019, he moved to Olympiakos Nicosia.

== Career statistics ==
(Correct as of 1 October 2010)

| Club | Season | League | | | Cup (Note: Includes Cup of Portugal, Taça da Liga, Supertaça Cândido de Oliveira) | | | Europe (Note: Includes UEFA Supercup) | | | Total | | |
| Club | Season | Apps | Goals | Assists | Apps | Goals | Assists | Apps | Goals | Assists | Apps | Goals | Assists |
|---|---|---|---|---|---|---|---|---|---|---|---|---|---|
| Marítimo | 2009–10 | 1 | 0 | 0 | 0 | 0 | 0 | 0 | 0 | 0 | 1 | 0 | 0 |
| Marítimo | 2010–11 | 1 | 0 | 0 | 0 | 0 | 0 | 1 | 0 | 0 | 2 | 0 | 0 |
| Marítimo | Total | 2 | 0 | 0 | 0 | 0 | 0 | 1 | 0 | 0 | 3 | 0 | 0 |
| Career total | | 2 | 0 | 0 | 0 | 0 | 0 | 1 | 0 | 0 | 3 | 0 | 0 |

== Honours ==
Sochaux

- Coupe Gambardella: 2007
