= Mpho Kgaswane =

Motswana footballer

Personal information
- Full name: Mpho Stephen Johane Kgaswane
- Date of birth: 13 June 1994 (age 32)
- Place of birth: Mmankgodi, Botswana
- Position: Midfielder

Team information
- Current team: Cape Town Spurs

Senior career*
Years	Team	Apps	(Gls)
2010–2015	Gaborone United		
2015–2019	Baroka	43	(5)
2019–2020	Zira	23	(5)
2021–	Cape Town Spurs	2	(0)

International career^{‡}
2015–2025	Botswana	24	(3)
- * Club domestic league appearances and goals as of 21 January 2021 ‡ National team caps and goals as of 8 September 2025

Mpho Kgaswane (born 13 June 1994) is a Motswana footballer who plays for Cape Town Spurs F.C.

== Career ==
=== Club ===
Kgaswane left Baroka by mutually consent in December 2018, with Zira FK announced the singing of Kgaswane on a six-month contract, with the option of an additional year, on 26 January 2019. On 10 June 2019, Kgaswane signed a new two-year contract with Zira. Kgaswane left Zira on 16 July 2020. On 11 January 2021, Kgaswane signed for Cape Town Spurs.
