= İlkin Qırtımov =

Azerbaijani footballer (born 1990)

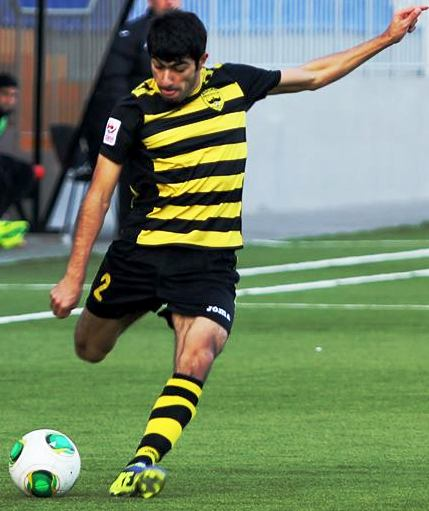

Personal information
- Full name: İlkin İlham oğlu Qırtımov
- Date of birth: 4 November 1990 (age 36)
- Place of birth: Zaqatala, Azerbaijan SSR
- Height: 1.75 m (5 ft 9 in)
- Position: Defender

Team information
- Current team: Zagatala
- Number: 2

Youth career
- 2005–2009: Simurq

Senior career*
Years	Team	Apps	(Gls)
2009–2015	Simurq	125	(2)
2015–2018	Keşla	68	(3)
2018	Neftchi Baku	6	(0)
2018–2019	Zira	23	(1)
2019–2022	Shamakhi	49	(0)
2022–2024	Gabala	54	(0)
2024–2025	Kapaz	17	(0)
2025–	Zagatala	11	(0)

International career^{‡}
2014–	Azerbaijan	5	(0)
- * Club domestic league appearances and goals as of 24 December 2025 ‡ National team caps and goals as of 6 August 2014

İlkin İlham oğlu Qırtımov (born 4 November 1990) is an Azerbaijani footballer who plays for Zagatala in the Azerbaijan First League.

== Club career ==
İlkin Qırtımov began playing football during his school years in Zaqatala under the guidance of Shaban Shirdanov. In 2008, he signed a contract with Simurq PFC and began to play at Simurqs youth system. He made his debut in the Azerbaijan Premier League in 2010. The contract was renewed in 2011.

On 9 January 2018, Neftchi Baku announced the signing of Qırtımov on a contract until the end of the 2017–18 season.

On 8 July 2019, Qırtımov returned to Keşla FK, signing a one-year contract.

On 23 May 2022, Gabala announced the signing of Qırtımov on a one-year contract. On 6 June 2023, Qırtımov extended his contract with Gabala for an additional two-years.

On 29 July 2024, Kapaz announced the signing of Qırtımov from Gabala to a one-year contract.

== Career statistics ==
=== Club ===
As of match played 20 April 2024

Appearances and goals by club, season and competition
Club	Season	League			National Cup		Continental		Other		Total	
Club	Season	Division	Apps	Goals	Apps	Goals	Apps	Goals	Apps	Goals	Apps	Goals
Simurq	2009-10	Azerbaijan Premier League	1	0	0	0	-		-		1	0
Simurq	2010-11	Azerbaijan Premier League	13	0	1	0	-		-		14	0
Simurq	2011-12	Azerbaijan Premier League	25	0	1	0	-		-		26	0
Simurq	2012-13	Azerbaijan Premier League	28	1	3	0	-		-		31	1
Simurq	2013-14	Azerbaijan Premier League	28	0	1	0	-		-		29	0
Simurq	2014-15	Azerbaijan Premier League	30	1	4	0	-		-		34	1
Simurq	Total		125	2	10	0	-	-	-	-	135	2
Keşla	2015–16	Azerbaijan Premier League	31	1	2	0	3	0	-		36	1
Keşla	2016–17	Azerbaijan Premier League	24	2	4	0	-		-		28	2
Keşla	2017–18	Azerbaijan Premier League	13	0	3	0	4	0	-		20	0
Keşla	Total		68	3	9	0	7	0	-	-	84	3
Neftchi Baku	2017–18	Azerbaijan Premier League	6	0	2	0	-		-		8	0
Zira	2018–19	Azerbaijan Premier League	23	1	4	0	-		-		27	1
Keşla	2019–20	Azerbaijan Premier League	16	0	0	0	-		-		16	0
Keşla	2020–21	Azerbaijan Premier League	12	0	4	0	1	0	-		17	0
Keşla	2021–22	Azerbaijan Premier League	21	0	2	0	2	0	-		25	0
Keşla	Total		49	0	6	0	0	0	-	-	58	0
Gabala	2022–23	Azerbaijan Premier League	30	0	6	0	2	0	-		38	0
Gabala	2023–24	Azerbaijan Premier League	24	0	4	0	2	0	-		30	0
Gabala	Total		54	0	10	0	4	0	-	-	68	0
Career total			326	6	41	0	14	0	-	-	380	6

=== International ===
Azerbaijan
Year	Apps	Goals
2014	5	0
Total	5	0

Statistics accurate as of match played 10 October 2014
