= Mirsahib Abbasov =

Azerbaijani footballer (born 1993)

Personal information
- Full name: Mirsahib Miryavar oglu Abbasov
- Date of birth: 19 January 1993 (age 33)
- Place of birth: Baku, Azerbaijan
- Height: 1.78 m (5 ft 10 in)
- Position: Forward

Team information
- Current team: Iravan

Senior career*
Years	Team	Apps	(Gls)
2014–2017	Keşla	48	(6)
2018–2019	Zira	26	(3)
2019–2022	Sabail	45	(2)
2022–2023	Zira	1	(0)
2023–	Iravan		
- * Club domestic league appearances and goals as of 6 November 2023

Mirsahib Abbasov is an Azerbaijani professional footballer who plays as a forward for Iravan in the Azerbaijan First League.

== Club career ==
On 29 November 2014, Abbasov made his debut in the Azerbaijan Premier League for Keşla match against Baku.
