= Bilal Hamdi =

Algerian footballer (born 1991)

Personal information
- Full name: Bilal Hamdi
- Date of birth: May 1, 1991 (age 35)
- Place of birth: Nedroma, Algeria
- Height: 1.76 m (5 ft 9 in)
- Position: Winger

Youth career
- 2004–2012: Lens

Senior career*
Years	Team	Apps	(Gls)
2010–2012	Lens B	41	(4)
2012–2013	Laval	34	(2)
2013–2015	Clermont	26	(0)
2014–2015	Clermont B	7	(5)
2015	Brest	6	(1)
2015	Brest B	5	(1)
2015–2017	Sedan	21	(2)
2017–2018	Alki Oroklini	28	(2)
2018–2019	Zira	20	(1)
2019	Sabail	0	(0)
2019–2020	Olympiakos Nicosia	14	(0)
2021–2022	Doxa Katokopias	10	(1)

International career
2009	Algeria U20		
2011	Algeria U23		
- * Club domestic league appearances and goals as of 29 April 2021

Bilal Hamdi (born 1 May 1991) is an Algerian professional footballer who played as a winger.

== Club career ==
Born in Nedroma, Algeria, Hamdi joined the youth ranks of RC Lens in 2004. In the summer of 2012, he terminated his contract with the club and signed a two-year contract with Ligue 2 side Stade Lavallois. On July 27, 2012, he made his debut for Laval as a starter in the first week of the 2012–13 Ligue 2 season against Châteauroux.

On 12 July 2018, Hamdi signed a one-year contract with Zira FK.

== International career ==
Bilal Hamdi holds Algerian and French nationalities. He represented France at youth international level.

In October 2009, Hamdi was called up to the Algeria national under-20 football team for the first time for a week-long training camp in Staouéli. In December, he was part of the under-20 team that finished second at the 2009 UNAF U-20 Tournament in Libya.

In 2011, he was called up to the Algeria national under-23 football team a number of times but did not make the final cut for the 2011 CAF U-23 Championship.
