= Zirə =

- Municipality
- Location within Azerbaijan
- Coordinates: 40°21′49″N 50°17′25″E
- Country: Azerbaijan
- City: Baku
- Raion: Əzizbəyov

Population (2008)
  - Total: 11,053
- Time zone: UTC+4 (AZT)
  - Summer (DST): UTC+5 (AZT)

Zira (Azerbaijani: Zirə) is a settlement and municipality in Baku, Azerbaijan. It has a population of 11,053.

Olive oil and table olive products processing plant in Zira settlement

Zira is famous in the Baku region for its tomatoes. Olive trees are grown in Zira, with olive oil and table olive products produced in the local "Absheron Olive Gardens" processing plant.

Azerbaijani professional football club Zira The club competes in the Azerbaijan Premier League.
