= 2018–19 Sabail FK season =

Səbail
2018-19 season
- Manager: Aftandil Hajiyev
- Stadium: Bayil Stadium
- Premier League: 3rd
- Azerbaijan Cup: Quarterfinal vs Zira
- Top goalscorer: League: Aghabala Ramazanov (7); All: Aghabala Ramazanov (8)

The Səbail FK 2018-19 season was Səbail's second Azerbaijan Premier League season, and their third season in existence. They finished the season in third position, qualifying for the UEFA Europa League for the first time. Sabail also entered the Azerbaijan Cup, reaching the Quarterfinals before defeat to Zira.

== Squad ==
As of match played 11 May 2019

No.	Name	Nationality	Position	Date of birth (age)	Signed from	Signed in	Contract ends	Apps.	Goals
Goalkeepers
1	Oleksandr Rybka	(Ukraine)	GK	10 April 1987 (aged 32)	Afjet Afyonspor	2019	2019	11	0
25	Elkhan Ahmadov	(Azerbaijan)	GK	2 July 1993 (aged 25)	Mil-Muğan	2017		10	0
Defenders
4	Henrique	(Brazil)	DF	8 February 1991 (aged 28)	Deportivo Saprissa	2018	2019	19	1
5	Vugar Beybalayev	(Azerbaijan)	DF	5 August 1993 (aged 25)	Sumgayit	2018		18	0
13	Shahriyar Rahimov	(Azerbaijan)	DF	6 April 1989 (aged 30)	Kapaz	2018		28	1
16	Ihor Korotetskyi	(Ukraine)	DF	13 September 1987 (aged 31)	Kapaz	2018		6	0
20	Eltun Yagublu	(Azerbaijan)	DF	19 August 1991 (aged 27)	Neftchi Baku	2017		27	1
26	Kamal Gurbanov	(Azerbaijan)	DF	6 May 1994 (aged 25)	Neftchi Baku	2017		35	0
27	Emil Martinov	(Bulgaria)	DF	18 March 1992 (aged 27)	Slavia Sofia	2018		24	0
32	Elvin Yunuszade	(Azerbaijan)	DF	22 August 1992 (aged 26)	Sabah	2019		12	2
33	Tome Kitanovski	(North Macedonia)	DF	21 May 1992 (aged 26)	Slaven Belupo	2018		23	1
99	Maudo Jarjué	(Guinea-Bissau)	DF	30 September 1997 (aged 21)	Gil Vicente	2017	2019	50	0
Midfielders
6	Michael Essien	(Ghana)	MF	3 December 1982 (aged 36)	Unattached	2019	2020	4	0
7	Fahmin Muradbayli	(Azerbaijan)	MF	16 March 1996 (aged 23)	loan from Neftchi Baku	2017		39	6
8	Eugeniu Cociuc	(Moldova)	MF	11 May 1993 (aged 26)	MŠK Žilina	2018		40	5
14	Rahid Amirguliyev	(Azerbaijan)	MF	1 September 1989 (aged 29)	Qarabağ	2018		28	0
17	Elchin Rahimli	(Azerbaijan)	MF	17 June 1996 (aged 22)	Qarabağ	2018		4	0
18	Agshin Gurbanli	(Azerbaijan)	MF	15 July 1996 (aged 22)	Neftchi Baku	2018		27	2
19	Ruslan Hajiyev	(Azerbaijan)	MF	20 March 1998 (aged 21)	loan from Qarabağ	2018		0	0
21	Murtuz Abakarov	(Azerbaijan)	MF	21 March 1998 (aged 21)		2017		7	1
70	Urfan İsmayılov	(Azerbaijan)	MF	17 May 1996 (aged 22)	Keşla	2018		3	0
77	Adilkhan Garahmadov	(Azerbaijan)	MF	5 June 2001 (aged 17)	Academy	2018		5	1
88	Orxan Gurbanli	(Azerbaijan)	MF	12 July 1995 (aged 23)	Neftchi Baku	2018		10	1
Forwards
9	Imanol Iriberri	(Argentina)	FW	4 March 1987 (aged 32)	Deportivo La Guaira	2019	2019	7	0
10	Aghabala Ramazanov	(Azerbaijan)	FW	20 January 1993 (aged 26)	Qarabağ	2018		23	8
11	Ruslan Qurbanov	(Azerbaijan)	FW	12 September 1991 (aged 27)	Gabala	2018		23	3
21	Oke Akpoveta	(Nigeria)	FW	13 December 1991 (aged 27)	AFC Eskilstuna	2019	2019	9	2
28	Kévin Koubemba	(Republic of the Congo)	FW	23 March 1993 (aged 26)	Bourg-Péronnas	2018		31	5
Left during the season
1	Emil Balayev	(Azerbaijan)	GK	17 April 1994 (aged 25)	Qarabağ	2017		42	0
3	Tamaz Tsetskhladze	(Georgia (country))	DF	8 December 1996 (aged 22)	Gardabani	2017		26	0
22	Édgar Pacheco	(Mexico)	MF	22 January 1990 (aged 29)	Ermis Aradippou	2018		8	0

== Transfers ==
=== In ===
Date	Position	Nationality	Name	From	Fee	Ref.
26 May 2018	MF	(Azerbaijan)	Rahid Amirguliyev	Qarabağ	Free	
26 May 2018	FW	(Azerbaijan)	Aghabala Ramazanov	Qarabağ	Free	
30 May 2018	DF	(Azerbaijan)	Shahriyar Rahimov	Kapaz	Free	
2 June 2018	MF	(Azerbaijan)	Orkhan Aliyev	Zira	Free	
8 June 2018	DF	(Azerbaijan)	Vugar Beybalayev	Sumgayit	Undisclosed	
11 June 2018	FW	(Azerbaijan)	Ruslan Qurbanov	Gabala	Free	
23 July 2018	FW	(Republic of the Congo)	Kévin Koubemba	Bourg-Péronnas	Undisclosed	
26 July 2018	DF	(Brazil)	Henrique	Deportivo Saprissa	Undisclosed	
30 July 2018	DF	(North Macedonia)	Tome Kitanovski	Slaven Belupo	Undisclosed	
8 August 2018	MF	(Mexico)	Édgar Pacheco	Ermis Aradippou	Undisclosed	
22 August 2018	MF	(Moldova)	Eugeniu Cociuc	MŠK Žilina	Undisclosed	
August 2018	DF	(Bulgaria)	Emil Martinov	Slavia Sofia	Undisclosed	
9 January 2019	DF	(Azerbaijan)	Elvin Yunuszade	Sabah	Undisclosed	
30 January 2019	GK	(Ukraine)	Oleksandr Rybka	Afjet Afyonspor	Undisclosed	
14 February 2019	FW	(Argentina)	Imanol Iriberri	Deportivo La Guaira	Undisclosed	
16 February 2019	FW	(Nigeria)	Oke Akpoveta	AFC Eskilstuna	Undisclosed	
16 March 2019	MF	(Ghana)	Michael Essien	Unattached	Free	

=== Loans in ===
Date from	Position	Nationality	Name	From	Date to	Ref.
Summer 2018	MF	(Azerbaijan)	Ruslan Hajiyev	Qarabağ	31 May 2020	

=== Out ===
Date	Position	Nationality	Name	To	Fee	Ref.
2 June 2018	DF	(Azerbaijan)	Rahil Mammadov	Qarabağ	Undisclosed	

=== Released ===
Date	Position	Nationality	Name	Joined	Date
3 July 2018	MF	(Azerbaijan)	Orkhan Aliyev	Sumgayit	
7 December 2018	MF	(Mexico)	Édgar Pacheco	Antigua	
31 December 2018	GK	(Azerbaijan)	Emil Balayev	Tobol	30 January 2019
30 April 2019	DF	(Georgia (country))	Tamaz Tsetskhladze	Torpedo Kutaisi	
9 May 2019	FW	(Azerbaijan)	Ruslan Gurbanov	Keşla	11 June 2019
31 May 2019	GK	(Azerbaijan)	Farhad Valiyev	Retired	
31 May 2019	DF	(Brazil)	Henrique	GAIS	9 August 2019
31 May 2019	DF	(North Macedonia)	Tome Kitanovski	Kukësi	21 June 2019
31 May 2019	MF	(Azerbaijan)	Murtuz Abakarov		
31 May 2019	MF	(Azerbaijan)	Urfan İsmayılov		
31 May 2019	DF	(Bulgaria)	Emil Martinov	Arda Kardzhali	26 June 2019
31 May 2019	FW	(Argentina)	Imanol Iriberri	Hibernians	
31 May 2019	FW	(Nigeria)	Oke Akpoveta	IK Frej	

== Friendlies ==
15 January 2019	Sabail (Azerbaijan)	v	(Hungary) Aqvital Csákvár	Antalya, Turkey
AZST (UTC+4)
Note: match cancelled due to heavy rain in Antalya.

16 January 2019	Sabail (Azerbaijan)	3 – 2	(Hungary) Aqvital Csákvár	Antalya, Turkey
AZST (UTC+4)	Qurbanov; Koubemba	Report	Goal

21 January 2019	Sabail (Azerbaijan)	–	(Kazakhstan) Kaisar	Antalya, Turkey
AZST (UTC+4)

24 January 2019	Sabail (Azerbaijan)	–	(Ukraine) Desna Chernihiv	Antalya, Turkey
AZST (UTC+4)

== Competitions ==
=== Overview ===
Competition	First match	Last match	Starting round	Final position	Record							
Competition	First match	Last match	Starting round	Final position	Pld	W	D	L	GF	GA	GD	Win %
Premier League	12 August 2018	11 May 2019	Matchday 1	3rd	28	12	5	11	34	37	−3	42.86
Azerbaijan Cup	6 December 2018	19 December 2018	Second Round	Quarterfinal	3	1	0	2	6	3	+3	33.33
Total					31	13	5	13	40	40	+0	41.94

Last updated: 11 May 2019
Source: Competitions

=== Premier League ===
==== Results summary ====
Overall								Home						Away					
Pld	W	D	L	GF	GA	GD	Pts	W	D	L	GF	GA	GD	W	D	L	GF	GA	GD
28	12	5	11	34	37	−3	41	5	4	5	14	16	−2	7	1	6	20	21	−1

Last updated: 11 May 2019.
Source: See Results

==== Results ====
12 August 2018 1	Gabala	3 – 0	Sabail	Qabala
18:00 AZT (UTC+4)	As.Mammadov 23'; Abbasov (yellow card) 27' (goal) 63'; Adeniyi 82'	Report		Stadium: Gabala City Stadium; Attendance: 600; Referee: Aliyar Ağayev

18 August 2018 2	Sabail	0 – 2	Qarabağ	Baku
18:30 AZT (UTC+4)	E.Balayev (yellow card) 4'; Koubemba (yellow card) 36'; Pacheco (yellow card) 83'	Report	Madatov 27', 86'	Stadium: Bayil Arena; Attendance: 1,050; Referee: Ramil Diniyev

26 August 2018 3	Keşla	1 – 2	Sabail	Baku
18:00 AZT (UTC+4)	Clennon (yellow card) 35'; Sohna (yellow card) 47'; Masimov (yellow card) 49'; Mitrović 75' (pen.)	Report	Koubemba 31', 50'; Kitanovski (yellow card) 87'	Stadium: ASK Arena; Attendance: 1,000; Referee: Rahim Həsənov

15 September 2018 4	Sabail	3 – 0	Zira	Baku
20:30 AZT (UTC+4)	Kitanovski (yellow card) 33'; Amirguliyev 84' (yellow card) 85'	Report	Isgandarli (yellow card) 29'; Tounkara (yellow card) 45+1'; Mustafayev (yellow card) 65'; Fardjad-Azad 68' (pen.) (yellow card) 80'	Stadium: Bayil Arena; Attendance: 500; Referee: Raad Ahmədov
Note: Sabail awarded a 3-0 win after Zira failed to register Huseyn Akhmedov on their bench as an U21 player.

22 September 2018 5	Sabail	0 – 0	Sabah	Baku
18:30 AZT (UTC+4)	Amirguliyev (yellow card) 84'	Report	Ivanović (yellow card) 29'; Imamverdiyev (yellow card) 73'	Stadium: Bayil Arena; Attendance: 1,000; Referee: Ravan Həmzəzadə

29 September 2018 6	Neftchi Baku	4 – 0	Sabail	Baku
18:55 AZT (UTC+4)	Dário 7', 42'; A.Krivotsyuk (yellow card) 19'; Dabo 25', 70'; Akhundov (yellow card) 26'	Report	Rahimov (yellow card) 30'; Korotetskyi (yellow card) 47'; Amirguliyev (yellow card) 65'	Stadium: Bakcell Arena; Attendance: 1,200; Referee: Ingilab Məmmədov

5 October 2018 7	Sabail	2 – 0	Sumgayit	Baku
19:00 AZT (UTC+4)	Muradbayli 3'; Qurbanov 30'; Kitanovski (yellow card) 90+2'; Pacheco (yellow card) 90+4'	Report	Malikov (yellow card) 45'	Stadium: Bayil Arena; Attendance: 500; Referee: Aliyar Ağayev

20 October 2018 8	Qarabağ	0 – 3	Sabail	Baku
19:00 AZT (UTC+4)	Zoubir (yellow card) 41' (goal) 62'; S.Məhəmmədəliyev (yellow card) 80'	Report	Cociuc (yellow card) 54'	Stadium: Azersun Arena; Attendance: 1,100; Referee: Ravan Həmzəzadə
Note: Match awarded as a 3-0 victory to Sabail.

28 October 2018 9	Sabail	2 – 1	Keşla	Baku
15:00 AZT (UTC+4)	Ramazanov (yellow card) 2'; Cociuc (yellow card) 10' (yellow-red card) 49' (goal) 24' (pen.); Muradbayli 29'; Korotetskyi (yellow card) 32'	Report	S.Alkhasov (yellow card) 25'; Masimov (yellow card) 43'; Denis 90+2'	Stadium: Bayil Arena; Attendance: 450; Referee: Ingilab Məmmədov

4 November 2018 10	Zira	0 – 0	Sabail	Baku
19:00 AZT (UTC+4)	I.Muradov (yellow card) 79'	Report	Rahimov (yellow card) 53' (yellow-red card) 60'; Jarjué (yellow card) 56'; E.Balayev (yellow card) 85'	Stadium: Bakcell Arena; Attendance: 300; Referee: Rahim Həsənov

10 November 2018 11	Sabah	0 – 4	Sabail	Masazır
17:30 AZT (UTC+4)	Ivanović (yellow card) 63'; E.Nabiyev (yellow card) 86'	Report	Qurbanov 3'; Koubemba 27'; Cociuc 58', 76'; Martinov (yellow card) 64'; Gurbanov (yellow card) 80'; Rahimli (yellow card) 84'	Stadium: Alinja Arena; Attendance: 1,000; Referee: Raad Ahmədov

25 November 2018 12	Sabail	0 – 2	Neftchi Baku	Baku
17:00 AZT (UTC+4)	Qurbanov (yellow card) 53'; Kitanovski (yellow card) 65' (yellow-red card) 90'	Report	Dabo 42'; Mahmudov 53' (pen.); Buludov (yellow card) 68'; Aghayev (yellow card) 89'	Stadium: Bayil Arena; Attendance: 1,500; Referee: Rauf Jabbarov

1 December 2018 13	Sumgayit	1 – 0	Sabail	Baku
19:00 AZT (UTC+4)	Ismayilov (yellow card) 48'; Yildirim 59'; Jannatov (yellow card) 80'; K.Najafov (yellow card) 81'; N.Gurbanov (yellow card) 90+5'	Report	U.İsmayılov (yellow card) 37'; Henrique (yellow card) 45'	Stadium: Bayil Arena; Attendance: 1,000; Referee: Aliyar Ağayev

9 December 2018 14	Sabail	0 – 0	Gabala	Baku
17:30 AZT (UTC+4)	Kitanovski (yellow card) 55'; Rahimov (yellow card) 70'; Jarjué (yellow card) 70'	Report	Aliyev (yellow card) 10' (yellow-red card) 85'	Stadium: Bayil Arena; Attendance: 500; Referee: Ingilab Məmmədov

2 February 2019 15	Keşla	0 – 3	Sabail	Baku
19:00 AZT (UTC+4)	Isgandarli (yellow card) 65'; J.Amirli (yellow card) 78'; Ayité (yellow card) 90+3'	Report	Koubemba 14'; Yunuszade 53'; Ramazanov 60'	Stadium: ASK Arena; Attendance: 450; Referee: Rahim Həsənov

10 February 2019 16	Sabail	0 – 2	Zira	Baku
16:30 AZT (UTC+4)	Yunuszade (yellow card) 61' (yellow-red card) 81'; A.Gurbanli (yellow card) 83'; Jarjué (yellow card) 88'	Report	Rodríguez 2'; Hamdi (yellow card) 68'; Dedov (yellow card) 90+1'; Tounkara 90+5'	Stadium: Bayil Arena; Attendance: 300; Referee: Aliyar Ağayev

17 February 2019 17	Sabail	1 – 0	Sabah	Baku
15:00 AZT (UTC+4)	Ramazanov 64'; Martinov (yellow card) 86'; Rybka (yellow card) 90+3'	Report	Khalilzade (yellow card) 41'; Wanderson (yellow card) 76'	Stadium: Bayil Arena; Attendance: 200; Referee: Ravan Həmzəzadə

24 February 2019 18	Neftchi Baku	1 – 2	Sabail	Baku
16:00 AZT (UTC+4)	Dabo 57'; Sansone (yellow card) 63'; Akhundov (yellow card) 66'	Report	Rahimov (yellow card) 21'; Ramazanov (yellow card) 27'; Koubemba 35'; Cociuc 43'; Amirguliyev (yellow card) 45+1'; Muradbayli (yellow card) 80'; Rybka (yellow card) 90+4'; Yagublu (yellow card) 90+6'	Stadium: Bakcell Arena; Attendance: 752; Referee: Orkhan Məmmədov

2 March 2019 19	Sabail	0 – 0	Sumgayit	Baku
16:00 AZT (UTC+4)	Garahmadov (yellow card) 34'; Yunuszade (yellow card) 46'	Report	Hüseynov (yellow card) 60'	Stadium: Bayil Arena; Attendance: 400; Referee: Sabuhi Bayramov

10 March 2019 20	Gabala	2 – 1	Sabil	Qabala
14:00 AZT (UTC+4)	Adeniyi (yellow card) 45+1' (goal) 49', 55'; B.Mustafazade (yellow card) 62' (yellow-red card) 73'	Report	Gurbanov (yellow card) 22'; Cociuc (yellow card) 34'; Yunuszade (yellow card) 54' (goal) 84'; Koubemba (yellow card) 70'	Stadium: Gabala City Stadium; Attendance: 550; Referee: Ingilab Məmmədov

15 March 2019 21	Sabil	1 – 2	Qarabağ	Baku
16:45 AZT (UTC+4)	Kitanovski (yellow card) 31'; Cociuc (yellow card) 40'; Ramazanov 42'	Report	Quintana 34'; Guerrier (yellow card) 59'; Richard 77' (pen.)	Stadium: Bayil Arena; Attendance: 800; Referee: Aliyar Ağayev

30 March 2019 22	Zira	1 – 2	Sabail	Zirə
16:00 AZT (UTC+4)	Scarlatache (yellow card) 24'; Rodríguez (yellow card) 57' (goal) 69'; K.Bayramov (yellow card) 71'	Report	Rahimov (yellow card) 28' (goal) 90+4'; Ramazanov 41'; Yunuszade (yellow card) 74'; Martinov (yellow card) 78'; Muradbayli (yellow card) 89'	Stadium: Zira Olympic Sport Complex Stadium; Attendance: 400; Referee: Vugar Həsənli

7 April 2019 23	Sabah	2 – 1	Sabail	Masazır
17:30 AZT (UTC+4)	Ivanović 32'; Imamverdiyev 66'; Wanderson 69'; Ramos (yellow card) 85'; Khalilzade (yellow card) 87'; V.Abdullayev (yellow card) 90+3'	Report	Henrique 2'; Muradbayli (yellow card) 82'	Stadium: Alinja Arena; Attendance: 600; Referee: Rahim Həsənov

14 April 2019 24	Sabail	2 – 2	Neftchi Baku	Baku
18:00 AZT (UTC+4)	Jarjué (yellow card) 23'; Ramazanov (yellow card) 49' (goal) 85'; Garahmadov 81'; Rybka (yellow card) 90+3' (yellow-red card) 90+6'	Report	Petrov (yellow card) 22'; Abbasov 50'; Dabo (yellow card) 78'; Sansone (yellow card) 87'; Mammadov (yellow card) 87'; Mbodj 90+6'	Stadium: Bayil Arena; Attendance: 1,600; Referee: Sabuhi Bayramov

18 April 2019 25	Sumgayit	1 – 2	Sabail	Sumqayit
16:45 AZT (UTC+4)	Babaei 14'; Dashdemirov (yellow card) 19'; K.Najafov (yellow card) 58'; Taghiyev (yellow card) 63'	Report	Ramazanov 52'; Kitanovski (yellow card) 55' (yellow-red card) 58'; Akpoveta 75'; Ahmadov (yellow card) 90+2'	Stadium: Kapital Bank Arena; Attendance: 1,000; Referee: Vugar Həsənli

27 April 2019 26	Sabail	2 – 1	Gabala	Baku
17:30 AZT (UTC+4)	Muradbayli 20'; Ramazanov 25' (yellow card) 74'; Rahimov (yellow card) 78'; Akpoveta (yellow card) 83'; Ahmadov (yellow card) 84'	Report	B.Mustafazade 41'; Huseynov (yellow card) 43'; Atakora (yellow card) 69'	Stadium: Bayil Arena; Attendance: 500; Referee: Aliyar Ağayev

5 May 2019 27	Qarabağ	4 – 0	Sabail	Baku
18:00 AZT (UTC+4)	Míchel 21'; Madatov 41', 69', 87'; B.Huseynov (yellow card) 49'; Ozobić (yellow card) 63'; Garayev (yellow card) 90+1'; Slavchev (yellow card) 90+3'	Report		Stadium: Tofiq Bahramov Republican Stadium; Attendance: 3,500; Referee: Rövşən Rəcəbov

11 May 2019 28	Sabail	1 – 4	Keşla	Baku
15:00 AZT (UTC+4)	Ramazanov (yellow card) 22'; Akpoveta (yellow card) 51' (goal) 54'; Rahimov (yellow card) 70'; Beybalayev (yellow card) 80'	Report	Clennon 7'; Girdvainis (yellow card) 22' (yellow-red card) 51' (goal) 38'; Masimov 45'; Ayité 72'; S.Tashkin (yellow card) 76'	Stadium: Bayil Arena; Attendance: 500; Referee: Sabuhi Bayramov

==== League table ====
Pos	Team	Pld	W	D	L	GF	GA	GD	Pts	Qualification or relegation
1	Qarabağ (C)	28	20	6	2	65	21	+44	66	Qualification for the Champions League first qualifying round
2	Neftçi Baku	28	17	7	4	52	26	+26	58	Qualification for the Europa League first qualifying round
3	Sabail	28	12	5	11	34	37	−3	41	Qualification for the Europa League first qualifying round
4	Gabala	28	9	9	10	31	33	−2	36	Qualification for the Europa League second qualifying round
5	Zira	28	8	7	13	30	40	−10	31	

Source: Soccerway
Rules for classification: 1) Points; 2) Head-to-head points; 3) Head-to-head goal difference; 4) Head-to-head goals scored; 5) Head-to-head away goals scored (only if two teams); 6) Goal difference; 7) Goals scored.
(C) Champions

=== Azerbaijan Cup ===
6 December 2018 Second Round	Kapaz	0 – 4	Sabail	Ganja
13:30 AZT (UTC+4)		Report	Kitanovski 12'; Koubemba (yellow card) 39'; A.Gurbanli 41'; O.Gurbanli 62'; Ramazanov 77'	Stadium: Ganja City Stadium; Attendance: 500; Referee: Ravan Həmzəzadə

15 December 2018 Quarterfinal 1st leg	Zira	1 – 0	Sabail	Baku
17:00 AZT (UTC+4)	Dedov (yellow card) 16'; Muradov 45'; Scarlatache (yellow card) 49'	Report	Kitanovski (red card) 33'; Jarjué (yellow card) 59'; Gurbanov (yellow card) 65'; Cociuc (yellow card) 86'	Stadium: Dalga Arena; Attendance: 200; Referee: Alik Yunusov

19 December 2018 Quarterfinal 2nd leg	Sabail	2 – 3 (2 – 4 agg.)	Zira	Baku
16:00 AZT (UTC+4)	Scarlatache 3' (o.g.); Rahimov (yellow card) 71'; Gurbanov 83'; A.Gurbanli (yellow card) 90+3'	Report	Naghiyev 45+2', 74' (yellow card) 74'; Tounkara (yellow card) 47'; Fardjad-Azad 63' (yellow card) 90+2'	Stadium: Bayil Arena; Attendance: 350; Referee: Ravan Həmzəzadə

== Squad statistics ==
As of Match played 11 May 2019

=== Appearances and goals ===
No.	Pos	Nat	Player	Total		Premier League		Azerbaijan Cup	
No.	Pos	Nat	Player	Apps	Goals	Apps	Goals	Apps	Goals
1	GK	(Ukraine) UKR	Oleksandr Rybka	11	0	11	0	0	0
4	DF	(Brazil) BRA	Henrique	19	1	14+2	1	3	0
5	DF	(Azerbaijan) AZE	Vugar Beybalayev	18	0	10+8	0	0	0
6	MF	(Ghana) GHA	Michael Essien	4	0	1+3	0	0	0
7	MF	(Azerbaijan) AZE	Fahmin Muradbayli	26	3	25+1	3	0	0
8	MF	(Moldova) MDA	Eugeniu Cociuc	27	3	22+2	3	2+1	0
9	FW	(Argentina) ARG	Imanol Iriberri	7	0	2+5	0	0	0
10	FW	(Azerbaijan) AZE	Aghabala Ramazanov	23	8	19+1	7	2+1	1
11	FW	(Azerbaijan) AZE	Ruslan Gurbanov	23	3	14+7	2	0+2	1
13	DF	(Azerbaijan) AZE	Shahriyar Rahimov	28	1	25	1	3	0
14	MF	(Azerbaijan) AZE	Rahid Amirguliyev	28	0	26	0	2	0
16	DF	(Ukraine) UKR	Ihor Korotetskyi	6	0	5+1	0	0	0
17	MF	(Azerbaijan) AZE	Elchin Rahimli	4	0	0+3	0	1	0
18	MF	(Azerbaijan) AZE	Agshin Gurbanli	19	1	1+15	0	3	1
20	DF	(Azerbaijan) AZE	Eltun Yagublu	2	0	0+2	0	0	0
21	FW	(Nigeria) NGR	Oke Akpoveta	9	1	5+4	1	0	0
25	GK	(Azerbaijan) AZE	Elkhan Ahmadov	5	0	3+1	0	1	0
26	DF	(Azerbaijan) AZE	Kamal Gurbanov	14	0	6+5	0	2+1	0
27	DF	(Bulgaria) BUL	Emil Martinov	24	0	16+5	0	2+1	0
28	FW	(Republic of the Congo) CGO	Kévin Koubemba	31	5	26+2	5	3	0
32	DF	(Azerbaijan) AZE	Elvin Yunuszade	12	2	12	2	0	0
33	DF	(North Macedonia) MKD	Tome Kitanovski	22	1	16+4	0	2	1
70	MF	(Azerbaijan) AZE	Urfan İsmayılov	3	0	1	0	1+1	0
77	MF	(Azerbaijan) AZE	Adilkhan Garahmadov	5	1	2+2	1	0+1	0
88	MF	(Azerbaijan) AZE	Orxan Gurbanli	5	1	0+3	0	1+1	1
99	DF	(Guinea-Bissau) GBS	Maudo Jarjué	28	0	25	0	3	0
Players away on loan:
Players who left Sabail during the season:
1	GK	(Azerbaijan) AZE	Emil Balayev	16	0	14	0	2	0
21	MF	(Azerbaijan) AZE	Murtuz Abakarov	1	0	0+1	0	0	0
22	MF	(Mexico) MEX	Édgar Pacheco	8	0	6+2	0	0	0

=== Goal scorers ===
Place	Position	Nation	Number	Name	Premier League	Azerbaijan Cup	Total
1	FW	(Azerbaijan)	10	Aghabala Ramazanov	7	1	8
2	FW	(Republic of the Congo)	28	Kévin Koubemba	5	0	5
3	MF	(Moldova)	8	Eugeniu Cociuc	4	0	4
4	MF	(Azerbaijan)	7	Fahmin Muradbayli	3	0	3
4	FW	(Azerbaijan)	11	Ruslan Gurbanov	2	1	3
6	DF	(Azerbaijan)	32	Elvin Yunuszade	2	0	2
6	FW	(Nigeria)	21	Oke Akpoveta	2	0	2
8	DF	(Azerbaijan)	13	Shahriyar Rahimov	1	0	1
8	DF	(Brazil)	4	Henrique	1	0	1
8	MF	(Azerbaijan)	77	Adilkhan Garahmadov	1	0	1
8	DF	(North Macedonia)	33	Tome Kitanovski	0	1	1
8	MF	(Azerbaijan)	18	Agshin Gurbanli	0	1	1
8	MF	(Azerbaijan)	88	Orxan Gurbanli	0	1	1
14				Awarded goals	6	0	6
				TOTALS	34	5	39

=== Clean sheets ===
Place	Position	Nation	Number	Name	Premier League	Azerbaijan Cup	Total
1	GK	(Azerbaijan)	1	Emil Balayev	7	0	7
2	GK	(Ukraine)	1	Oleksandr Rybka	3	0	3
3	GK	(Azerbaijan)	25	Elkhan Ahmadov	0	1	1
				TOTALS	10	1	11

=== Disciplinary record ===
Number	Nation	Position	Name	Premier League		Azerbaijan Cup		Total	
Number	Nation	Position	Name	Yellow card	Red card	Yellow card	Red card	Yellow card	Red card
1	(Ukraine)	GK	Oleksandr Rybka	4	1	0	0	4	1
4	(Brazil)	DF	Henrique	1	0	0	0	1	0
5	(Azerbaijan)	DF	Vugar Beybalayev	1	0	0	0	1	0
7	(Azerbaijan)	MF	Fahmin Muradbayli	3	0	0	0	3	0
8	(Moldova)	MF	Eugeniu Cociuc	5	1	1	0	6	1
10	(Azerbaijan)	FW	Aghabala Ramazanov	5	0	0	0	5	0
11	(Azerbaijan)	FW	Ruslan Gurbanov	2	0	1	0	3	0
13	(Azerbaijan)	DF	Shahriyar Rahimov	8	1	1	0	9	1
14	(Azerbaijan)	MF	Rahid Amirguliyev	4	0	0	0	4	0
16	(Ukraine)	DF	Ihor Korotetskyi	2	0	0	0	2	0
17	(Azerbaijan)	MF	Elchin Rahimli	1	0	0	0	1	0
18	(Azerbaijan)	MF	Agshin Gurbanli	1	0	1	0	2	0
20	(Azerbaijan)	DF	Eltun Yagublu	1	0	0	0	1	0
21	(Nigeria)	FW	Oke Akpoveta	2	0	0	0	2	0
25	(Azerbaijan)	GK	Elkhan Ahmadov	2	0	0	0	2	0
26	(Azerbaijan)	DF	Kamal Gurbanov	1	0	0	0	1	0
27	(Bulgaria)	DF	Emil Martinov	3	0	0	0	3	0
28	(Republic of the Congo)	FW	Kévin Koubemba	2	0	1	0	3	0
32	(Azerbaijan)	DF	Elvin Yunuszade	5	1	0	0	5	1
33	(North Macedonia)	DF	Tome Kitanovski	10	2	0	1	10	3
70	(Azerbaijan)	MF	Urfan İsmayılov	1	0	0	0	1	0
77	(Azerbaijan)	MF	Adilkhan Garahmadov	1	0	0	0	1	0
99	(Guinea-Bissau)	DF	Maudo Jarjué	4	0	1	0	5	0
Players away on loan:
Players who left Sabail during the season:
1	(Azerbaijan)	GK	Emil Balayev	2	0	0	0	2	0
22	(Mexico)	MF	Édgar Pacheco	2	0	0	0	2	0
			TOTALS	73	6	6	1	79	7
