= 2018–19 Neftchi Baku PFK season =

Neftchi Baku
2018–19 season
- Manager: Roberto Bordin
- Stadium: Bakcell Arena
- Azerbaijan Premier League: 2nd
- Azerbaijan Cup: Second Round vs Sumgayit
- Europa League: Second qualifying round vs Újpest
- Top goalscorer: League: Bagaliy Dabo (14); All: Bagaliy Dabo (16)
Home colours	Away colours

The Neftchi Baku 2018–19 season is Neftchi Baku's 27th Azerbaijan Premier League season. Neftchi will compete Azerbaijan Premier League and in the Azerbaijan Cup and Europa League.

== Season review ==
On 8 June, Roberto Bordin was announced as Neftçi's new manager on a two-year contract.

On 12 June, Ruslan Abışov, Mahammad Mirzabeyov and Kyrylo Petrov all extended their contract with Neftchi Baku.| 2020

On 17 June, Bagaliy Dabo signed a two-year contract with Neftçi Baku.

On 24 June, Neftchi Baku signed Goran Paracki on a two-year contract from Wellington Phoenix.

On 27 June, Rahman Hajiyev signed a new contract with Neftchi Baku, until the summer of 2020.

On 29 June, Neftchi Baku announced the signing of Kwame Karikari from Al-Arabi on a two-year contract.

On 1 July, Soni Mustivar and Anton Krivotsyuk both signed a one-year extension to their contracts, keeping them at Neftchi Baku until the summer of 2020. The following day, 2 July, Namik Alaskarov also extended his contract until the summer of 2020.

On 8 December, Neftchi announced the signing of Mamadou Mbodj on a 2.5-year contract from FK Žalgiris, and a three-year contract with Mamadou Kane. On 20 December, Rashad Eyyubov had his contract terminated by mutual consent.

On 3 January, Neftchi announce the signing of Turan Valizade from Fenerbahçe on a three-year contract. 4 days later, 7 January, Agil Mammadov returned to Neftchi Baku from Gabala for his third stint with the club, signing an 18-month contract. On 23 January, Vangelis Platellas joined from OFI Crete on an 18-month contract. Slavko Bralić had his contract with Neftchi Baku by mutual agreement on 30 January 2019, whilst on the same day Dário moved to Daegu. On 2 February, Gianluca Sansone signed a 1.5-year contract with Neftchi Baku.

On 15 February, Petru Racu signed on a contract until the end of the season.

== Squad ==
As of match played 11 May 2019

No.	Name	Nationality	Position	Date of birth (age)	Signed from	Signed in	Contract ends	Apps.	Goals
Goalkeepers
1	Salahat Aghayev	(Azerbaijan)	GK	4 January 1991 (aged 28)	Inter Baku	2017		43	0
12	Kamran Ibrahimov	(Azerbaijan)	GK	7 June 1999 (aged 19)	Academy	2015		0	0
30	Agil Mammadov	(Azerbaijan)	GK	1 May 1989 (aged 30)	Gabala	2019	2020	51	0
Defenders
3	Mamadou Mbodj	(Senegal)	DF	12 March 1993 (aged 26)	Žalgiris	2019	2021	13	5
4	Petru Racu	(Moldova)	DF	17 July 1987 (aged 31)	Sheriff Tiraspol	2019	2019	2	0
5	Anton Krivotsyuk	(Azerbaijan)	DF	20 August 1998 (aged 20)	Academy	2016	2020	56	3
15	Ruslan Abışov	(Azerbaijan)	DF	10 October 1987 (aged 31)	Keşla	2017	2020	175+	13
18	Tural Akhundov	(Azerbaijan)	DF	1 August 1988 (aged 30)	Sumgayit	2018	2019	27	0
21	Mahammad Mirzabeyov	(Azerbaijan)	DF	16 November 1990 (aged 28)	Gabala	2017	2019	36	0
25	Kyrylo Petrov	(Ukraine)	DF	22 June 1990 (aged 28)	Olimpik Donetsk	2017	2019	62	1
26	Omar Buludov	(Azerbaijan)	DF	15 December 1998 (aged 20)	Academy	2016		29	1
51	Elchin Asadov	(Azerbaijan)	DF	3 August 1999 (aged 19)	Academy	2016		0	0
70	Əli Şirinov	(Azerbaijan)	DF	9 August 1998 (aged 20)	Academy	2017		4	0
77	Elvin Sarkarov	(Azerbaijan)	DF	24 February 1997 (aged 22)	Academy	2016		6	0
Midfielders
6	Goran Paracki	(Croatia)	MF	21 January 1987 (aged 32)	Wellington Phoenix	2018	2020	26	2
7	Namik Alaskarov	(Azerbaijan)	MF	3 February 1995 (aged 24)	Qarabağ	2017	2020	70	11
8	Emin Mahmudov	(Azerbaijan)	MF	27 April 1992 (aged 27)	Boavista	2017		54	11
11	Vangelis Platellas	(Greece)	MF	1 December 1988 (aged 30)	OFI Crete	2019	2020	13	0
17	Rahman Hajiyev	(Azerbaijan)	MF	25 July 1993 (aged 25)	Baku	2014	2020	145	15
19	Fahmin Muradbayli	(Azerbaijan)	MF	16 March 1996 (aged 23)	Academy	2013		73	6
20	Elnur Suleymanov	(Azerbaijan)	MF	17 September 1996 (aged 22)	Shuvalan	2017		1	0
33	Turan Valizade	(Azerbaijan)	MF	1 January 2001 (aged 18)	Fenerbahçe	2019	2021	1	0
36	Mamadou Kane	(Guinea)	MF	22 January 1997 (aged 22)	Kaloum Star	2019	2021	9	0
93	Soni Mustivar	(Haiti)	MF	12 February 1990 (aged 29)	Sporting Kansas City	2018	2020	35	1
Forwards
9	Bagaliy Dabo	(France)	FW	27 July 1988 (aged 30)	Gabala	2018	2020	30	16
16	Gianluca Sansone	(Italy)	FW	12 May 1987 (aged 31)	Novara	2019	2020	11	2
22	Mirabdulla Abbasov	(Azerbaijan)	FW	27 April 1995 (aged 24)	Sumgayit	2017		66	13
Out on loan
11	Kwame Karikari	(Ghana)	FW	21 January 1992 (aged 27)	Al-Arabi	2018	2020	10	2
Left during the season
4	Rashad Eyyubov	(Azerbaijan)	MF	3 December 1992 (aged 26)	Sumgayit	2018	2019	6	0
10	Dário	(Brazil)	FW	12 February 1990 (aged 29)	Kapaz	2018	2019	17	3
28	Slavko Bralić	(Croatia)	DF	15 December 1991 (aged 27)	Široki Brijeg	2018	2019	13	0
94	Rashad Azizli	(Azerbaijan)	GK	1 January 1994 (aged 25)	Sabail	2017		21	0
	Lucas Gómez	(Argentina)	FW	6 October 1987 (aged 31)	Deportivo Lara	2018	2019	16	3

=== On loan ===
Note: Flags indicate national team as defined under FIFA eligibility rules; some limited exceptions apply. Players may hold more than one non-FIFA nationality.

No.	Pos.	Nation	Player
—	DF	AZE	Tayyar Mammadov (at Sabah)
—	MF	AZE	Orkhan Gurbanli (at Sabail)
—	MF	AZE	Fahmin Muradbayli (at Sabail)
—	FW	GHA	Kwame Karikari (at Al Urooba)

=== Left club during season ===
Note: Flags indicate national team as defined under FIFA eligibility rules; some limited exceptions apply. Players may hold more than one non-FIFA nationality.

No.	Pos.	Nation	Player
4	MF	AZE	Rashad Eyyubov (to Sabah)
10	FW	BRA	Dário (to Daegu)
28	DF	CRO	Slavko Bralić

No.	Pos.	Nation	Player
94	GK	AZE	Rashad Azizli (to Sumgayit)
—	FW	ARG	Lucas Gómez

== Transfers ==
=== In ===
Date	Position	Nationality	Name	From	Fee	Ref.
11 June 2018	DF	(Azerbaijan)	Tural Akhundov	Sumgayit	Undisclosed	
11 June 2018	FW	(Brazil)	Dário	Kapaz	Undisclosed	
12 June 2018	MF	(Azerbaijan)	Rashad Eyyubov	Sumgayit	Undisclosed	
15 June 2018	DF	(Croatia)	Slavko Bralić	Široki Brijeg	Undisclosed	
17 June 2018	FW	(France)	Bagaliy Dabo	Gabala	Free	
24 June 2018	MF	(Croatia)	Goran Paracki	Wellington Phoenix	Free	
29 June 2018	FW	(Ghana)	Kwame Karikari	Al-Arabi	Undisclosed	
6 December 2018	MF	(Guinea)	Mamadou Kane	Kaloum Star	Undisclosed	
8 December 2018	DF	(Senegal)	Mamadou Mbodj	Žalgiris	Free	
3 January 2019	MF	(Azerbaijan)	Turan Valizade	Fenerbahçe	Undisclosed	
7 January 2019	GK	(Azerbaijan)	Agil Mammadov	Gabala	Undisclosed	
23 January 2019	MF	(Greece)	Vangelis Platellas	OFI Crete	Undisclosed	
2 February 2019	FW	(Italy)	Gianluca Sansone	Novara	Undisclosed	
15 February 2019	DF	(Moldova)	Petru Racu	Sheriff Tiraspol	Free	

=== Out ===
Date	Position	Nationality	Name	To	Fee	Ref.
25 December 2018	GK	(Azerbaijan)	Rashad Azizli	Sumgayit	Undisclosed	
30 January 2019	FW	(Brazil)	Dário	Daegu	Undisclosed	

=== Loans out ===
Date from	Position	Nationality	Name	To	Date to	Ref.
22 January 2019	FW	(Ghana)	Kwame Karikari	Al Urooba	1 June 2019	

=== Released ===
Date	Position	Nationality	Name	Joined	Date
31 May 2018	DF	(Azerbaijan)	Ilkin Qirtimov	Zira	12 June 2018
31 May 2018	MF	(Azerbaijan)	Farid Abbasli		
31 May 2018	MF	(Azerbaijan)	Rashad Sadiqov	Sabah	27 June 2018
31 May 2018	MF	(Azerbaijan)	Elnur Jafarov	Keşla	28 July 2018
31 May 2018	MF	(Paraguay)	David Meza	Petrolul Ploiești	27 July 2019
31 May 2018	FW	(Chile)	Ignacio Herrera	Seoul E-Land	29 June 2018
25 June 2018	MF	(Paraguay)	Francisco García	Independiente	
9 July 2018	MF	(Colombia)	Mike Campaz	Alianza	
20 December 2018	MF	(Azerbaijan)	Rashad Eyyubov	Sabah	21 December 2018
	GK	(Azerbaijan)	Maksim Vaylo		
31 December 2018	FW	(Argentina)	Lucas Gómez	Juan Aurich	
30 January 2019	DF	(Croatia)	Slavko Bralić	AEL	31 January 2019
15 May 2019	DF	(Azerbaijan)	Mahammad Mirzabeyov	Sabah	18 June 2019
15 May 2019	DF	(Moldova)	Petru Racu	Petrolul Ploiești	
15 May 2019	MF	(Croatia)	Goran Paracki	Slaven Belupo	

== Friendlies ==
24 June 2018 Friendly	Neftchi Baku (Azerbaijan)	2 – 0	(North Macedonia) Shkëndija	Turkey
18:00 AZT (UTC+4)	Alaskarov 62'; Abbasov 86'	Report

28 June 2018 Friendly	Neftchi Baku (Azerbaijan)	2 – 0	(Romania) Dunărea Călărași	Turkey
AZT (UTC+4)	Dário 39'; Abbasov 60'	Report

2 July 2018 Friendly	Neftchi Baku (Azerbaijan)	4 – 0	(Bosnia and Herzegovina) Čelik Zenica	Turkey
AZT (UTC+4)	Dabo 14'; Hajiyev 18', 34'; Alaskarov 60'	Report

5 July 2018 Friendly	Neftchi Baku (Azerbaijan)	3 – 1	(Romania) Politehnica Iași	Turkey
AZT (UTC+4)	Hajiyev 26'; Dabo 64'; Eyyubov 90'	Report	Zaharia 57'	Stadium: Fenerbahce Topuk Plateau Resort and Sport

18 January 2019	Neftchi Baku (Azerbaijan)	3 – 0	(Romania) Gaz Metan Mediaș	Antalya, Turkey
AZST (UTC+4)	Hajiyev 11'; A.Shirinov 70', 84'	Report

20 January 2019	Neftchi Baku (Azerbaijan)	v	(Iran) Esteghlal	Antalya, Turkey
AZST (UTC+4)		Report

23 January 2019	Neftchi Baku (Azerbaijan)	1 – 2	(Czech Republic) Slovan Liberec	Antalya, Turkey
AZST (UTC+4)	Abbasov 21'	Report	36'; 46'

26 January 2019	Neftchi Baku (Azerbaijan)	4 – 0	(Bulgaria) Beroe Stara Zagora	Antalya, Turkey
16:30 AZST (UTC+4)	Dário 10', 30'; Dabo 39'; Mahmudov (penalty missed) 42'; Platellas 58'	Report

== Competitions ==
=== Premier League ===
==== Results summary ====
Overall								Home						Away					
Pld	W	D	L	GF	GA	GD	Pts	W	D	L	GF	GA	GD	W	D	L	GF	GA	GD
28	17	7	4	52	26	+26	58	8	3	3	30	15	+15	9	4	1	22	11	+11

Last updated: 11 May 2019.
Source: See Results

==== Results ====
11 August 2018 1	Sumgayit	0 – 2	Neftçi Baku	Baku
20:00 AZT (UTC+4)	S.Ahmadov (yellow card) 36'; Hüseynov (yellow card) 56' (yellow-red card) 67'	Report	Abbasov 27'; Mirzabeyov (yellow card) 62'; Mahmudov 71'; A.Krivotsyuk (yellow card) 88'	Stadium: Dalga Arena; Attendance: 800; Referee: Rauf Jabbarov

19 August 2018 2	Neftçi Baku	2 – 1	Gabala	Baku
18:30 AZT (UTC+4)	Dabo 36'; Dário 48'	Report	E.Jamalov (yellow card) 40'; Aliyev 85'	Stadium: Dalga Arena; Attendance: 600; Referee: Rahim Hasanov

26 August 2018 3	Qarabağ	1 – 1	Neftçi Baku	Baku
20:30 AZT (UTC+4)	Emeghara 70'; Madatov (yellow card) 84'	Report	Karikari 28'	Stadium: Azersun Arena; Attendance: 3,000; Referee: Aliyar Ağayev

16 September 2018 4	Neftchi Baku	2 – 0	Keşla	Baku
21:00 AZT (UTC+4)	A.Krivotsyuk (yellow card) 69' (goal) 88'; Dabo 90+3'	Report	Guliyev (yellow card) 25'; Sohna (yellow card) 58'; Aghayev (yellow card) 88'	Stadium: Bakcell Arena; Attendance: 1,300; Referee: Ramil Diniyev

22 September 2018 5	Zira	1 – 2	Neftchi Baku	Baku
20:30 AZT (UTC+4)	Duventru 33'; Qirtimov (yellow card) 71'; Mustafayev (yellow card) 73'	Report	Abbasov 6'; Mustivar (yellow card) 18'; Akhundov (yellow card) 27'; Paracki 52'; A.Krivotsyuk (yellow card) 83'	Stadium: Dalga Stadium; Attendance: 600; Referee: Rauf Jabbarov

29 September 2018 6	Neftchi Baku	4 – 0	Sabail	Baku
18:55 AZT (UTC+4)	Dário 7', 42'; A.Krivotsyuk (yellow card) 19'; Dabo 25', 70'; Akhundov (yellow card) 26'	Report	Rahimov (yellow card) 30'; Korotetskyi (yellow card) 47'; Amirguliyev (yellow card) 65'	Stadium: Bakcell Arena; Attendance: 1,200; Referee: Ingilab Məmmədov

5 October 2018 7	Neftchi Baku	2 – 0	Sabah	Baku
20:15 AZT (UTC+4)	Mahmudov 9' (yellow card) 64'; Bralić (yellow card) 45+1' (yellow-red card) 75'; Paracki 62' (yellow card) 82'	Report	Ramos (yellow card) 57'; Bosančić (yellow card) 88'	Stadium: Bakcell Arena; Attendance: 1,000; Referee: Orkhan Məmmədov

20 October 2018 8	Gabala	3 – 1	Neftchi Baku	Qabala
17:00 AZT (UTC+4)	Adeniyi 14', 77'; E.Jamalov (yellow card) 34'; Ramaldanov (yellow card) 41'; Joseph-Monrose 57'; Khalilzade (yellow card) 59' (yellow-red card) 67'; Ag.Mammadov (yellow card) 85'	Report	Mahmudov (yellow card) 59'; Petrov (yellow card) 64'; A.Krivotsyuk (yellow card) 82'; Karikari 90+4'	Stadium: Gabala City Stadium; Attendance: 700; Referee: Rahim Həsənov

28 October 2018 9	Neftchi Baku	3 – 1	Qarabağ	Baku
17:00 AZT (UTC+4)	Huseynov 10' (o.g.); Akhundov (yellow card) 19'; Abbasov 26'; Mustivar (yellow card) 42'; Buludov (yellow card) 50'; Petrov (yellow card) 77'; Dabo 87' (yellow card) 90'	Report	Huseynov (yellow card) 13'; Madatov (yellow card) 56' (goal) 87'; Sadygov (yellow card) 66'; Guseynov (yellow card) 79'	Stadium: Bakcell Arena; Attendance: 4,000; Referee: Aliyar Ağayev

3 November 2018 10	Keşla	1 – 0	Neftchi Baku	Baku
17:00 AZT (UTC+4)	Guidileye (yellow card) 22'; S.Tashkin (yellow card) 47'	Report	Abbasov 2'; Bralić (yellow card) 67'; Aghayev (yellow card) 90+4'	Stadium: ASK Arena; Attendance: 1,500; Referee: Rauf Jabbarov

10 November 2018 11	Neftchi Baku	2 – 2	Zira	Baku
19:30 AZT (UTC+4)	Dabo 36'; Paracki (yellow card) 62'; Mustivar (yellow card) 66'; Abbasov (yellow card) 69' (goal) 80'; Bralić (yellow card) 90'	Report	K.Mirzayev (yellow card) 12'; Mutallimov (yellow card) 30' (goal) 76'; Qirtimov (yellow card) 61'; Isgandarli 83'; M.Abbasov (yellow card) 90'	Stadium: Bakcell Arena; Attendance: 2,500; Referee: Ingilab Məmmədov

25 November 2018 12	Sabail	0 – 2	Neftchi Baku	Baku
17:00 AZT (UTC+4)	Qurbanov (yellow card) 53'; Kitanovski (yellow card) 65' (yellow-red card) 90'	Report	Dabo 42'; Mahmudov 53' (pen.); Buludov (yellow card) 68'; Aghayev (yellow card) 89'	Stadium: Bayil Arena; Attendance: 1,500; Referee: Rauf Jabbarov

1 December 2018 13	Sabah	1 – 2	Neftchi Baku	Masazır
16:30 AZT (UTC+4)	N.Mammadov (yellow card) 35'; Ivanović (yellow card) 38'; Wanderson (yellow card) 45+2' (yellow-red card) 70'; Dević (yellow card) 68' (goal) 76' (pen.)	Report	Akhundov (yellow card) 10' (yellow-red card) 33'; A.Krivotsyuk 21'; Dabo (yellow card) 30' (yellow-red card) 84'; Abbasov 39'; Bralić (yellow card) 45+1'; Alaskarov (yellow card) 90+1'	Stadium: Alinja Arena; Attendance: 2,000; Referee: Rahim Həsənov

9 December 2018 14	Neftchi Baku	0 – 0	Sumgayit	Baku
19:30 AZT (UTC+4)	Petrov (yellow card) 40'; Alaskarov (yellow card) 53'; Buludov (yellow card) 90+1'	Report		Stadium: Bakcell Arena; Attendance: 1,000; Referee: Ravan Həmzəzadə

3 February 2019 15	Qarabağ	1 – 1	Neftchi Baku	Baku
18:30 AZT (UTC+4)	Quintana 6'; Madatov (yellow card) 32'; Garayev (yellow card) 90' (yellow-red card) 90+2'	Report	Mbodj (yellow card) 28' (goal) 30'; Dabo (yellow card) 35'; A.Krivotsyuk (yellow card) 50' (yellow-red card) 70'	Stadium: Tofiq Bahramov Republican Stadium; Attendance: 6,000; Referee: Ravan Həmzəzadə

10 February 2019 16	Neftchi Baku	2 – 0	Keşla	Baku
14:00 AZT (UTC+4)	Mahmudov 35', 68' (pen.); Buludov (yellow card) 78'	Report	Denis (yellow card) 7'; Kamara (yellow card) 33'; Isgandarli (yellow card) 37'; A.Salahli (yellow card) 66'; Guliyev (yellow card) 67'	Stadium: Bakcell Arena; Attendance: 1,000; Referee: Ingilab Məmmədov

16 February 2019 17	Zira	0 – 0	Neftchi Baku	Zirə
17:30 AZT (UTC+4)	Radivojević (yellow card) 45+1'; B.Hasanalizade (yellow card) 53'; K.Bayramov (yellow card) 87'	Report	Petrov (yellow card) 80'	Stadium: Zira Olympic Sport Complex Stadium; Attendance: 1,200; Referee: Səbuhi Bayramov

24 February 2019 18	Neftchi Baku	1 – 2	Sabail	Baku
16:00 AZT (UTC+4)	Dabo 57'; Sansone (yellow card) 63'; Akhundov (yellow card) 66'	Report	Rahimov (yellow card) 21'; Ramazanov (yellow card) 27'; Koubemba 35'; Cociuc 43'; Amirguliyev (yellow card) 45+1'; F.Muradbayli (yellow card) 80'; Rybka (yellow card) 90+4'; E.Yagublu (yellow card) 90+6'	Stadium: Bakcell Arena; Attendance: 752; Referee: Orkhan Məmmədov

2 March 2019 19	Neftchi Baku	3 – 0	Sabah	Baku
18:30 AZT (UTC+4)	Sansone 9' (yellow card) 11'; Dabo (yellow card) 12' (goal) 79'; Mahmudov 24'; Platellas (yellow card) 34'; Buludov (yellow card) 67'; Mirzabeyov (yellow card) 75' (yellow-red card) 84'; Mustivar (yellow card) 81'	Report	Khalilzade (yellow card) 11'; Eyyubov (yellow card) 25'; N.Mammadov (yellow card) 44'	Stadium: Bakcell Arena; Attendance: 1,000; Referee: Vugar Həsənli

10 March 2019 20	Sumgayit	1 – 2	Neftchi Baku	Sumqayit
16:30 AZT (UTC+4)	Babaei 26' (yellow card) 65'; Malikov (yellow card) 72'; Jannatov (red card) 77'; U.Iskandarov (yellow card) 83'; E.Babayev (yellow card) 84'	Report	Dabo (yellow card) 19'; Kane (yellow card) 29'; Platellas (yellow card) 57'; Mammadov (yellow card) 75'; Petrov (yellow card) 76'; Mbodj 76'; Buludov 87'; A.Şirinov (yellow card) 87'; Sansone (yellow card) 89'; Alaskarov (yellow card) 90+3'	Stadium: Kapital Bank Arena; Attendance: 2,000; Referee: Raad Ahmədov

15 March 2019 21	Neftchi Baku	1 – 1	Gabala	Baku
19:00 AZST (UTC+4)	Mustivar (yellow card) 33'; Mbodj 54' (yellow card) 78'	Report	E.Jamalov (yellow card) 30'; Joseph-Monrose 72' (yellow card) 90'	Stadium: Bakcell Arena; Attendance: 1,300; Referee: Sabuhi Bayramov

30 March 2019 22	Keşla	0 – 1	Neftchi Baku	Baku
18:30 AZT (UTC+4)	Kamara (yellow card) 39'	Report	Mahmudov (yellow card) 73' (goal) 79' (pen.)	Stadium: ASK Arena; Attendance: 1,500; Referee: Aliyar Ağayev

6 April 2019 23	Neftchi Baku	4 – 2	Zira	Baku
18:00 AZT (UTC+4)	Mbodj (yellow card) 18'; Dabo 40', 88' (yellow card) 90+3'; Krivotsyuk 44' (yellow card) 90'; Alaskarov (yellow card) 61'; Mahmudov (yellow card) 90'	Report	Kgaswane 59', 80' (pen.); I.Muradov (yellow card) 62' (yellow-red card) 90'; Qirtimov (yellow card) 66'; Scarlatache (yellow card) 87'; B.Hasanalizade (yellow card) 90'; O.Sadiqli (red card) 90+3'	Stadium: Bakcell Arena; Attendance: 1,100; Referee: Ingilab Məmmədov

14 April 2019 24	Sabail	2 – 2	Neftchi Baku	Baku
18:00 AZT (UTC+4)	Jarjué (yellow card) 23'; Ramazanov (yellow card) 49' (goal) 85'; Ə.Qarəhmədov 81'; Rybka (yellow card) 90+3' (yellow-red card) 90+6'	Report	Petrov (yellow card) 22'; Abbasov 50'; Dabo (yellow card) 78'; Sansone (yellow card) 87'; Mammadov (yellow card) 87'; Mbodj 90+6'	Stadium: Bayil Arena; Attendance: 1,600; Referee: Sabuhi Bayramov

19 April 2019 24	Sabah	0 – 2	Neftchi Baku	Masazır
18:30 AZT (UTC+4)	Ivanović (yellow card) 22'; N.Mammadov (yellow card) 37' (yellow-red card) 56'; Ramos (yellow card) 61'	Report	Mbodj (yellow card) 20'; Akhundov (yellow card) 27'; Paracki (yellow card) 35'; Mahmudov (yellow card) 48'; Alaskarov 59', 62'	Stadium: Alinja Arena; Attendance: 1,600; Referee: Rovan Rəcəbov

27 April 2019 26	Neftchi Baku	2 – 3	Sumgayit	Baku
19:00 AZT (UTC+4)	Abışov 8'; Racu (yellow card) 21'; Mustivar (yellow card) 41'; Dabo 72' (yellow card) 90+3'	Report	Agayev 32'; U.Iskandarov 42'; Jannatov (yellow card) 57'; S.Aliyev (yellow card) 72'; M.Khachayev 77'; N.Gurbanov (yellow card) 81'	Stadium: Bakcell Arena; Attendance: 1,000; Referee: Kamal Umudlu

5 May 2019 27	Gabala	1 – 3	Neftchi Baku	Qabala
18:00 AZT (UTC+4)	A.Seydiyev (yellow card) 8'; Ramaldanov (yellow card) 57'; Aliyev 84'; Stanković (yellow card) 90+2'	Report	Mbodj 25'; Mahmudov (yellow card) 59'; Krivotsyuk (yellow card) 68'; Dabo 71', 90' (pen.)	Stadium: Gabala City Stadium; Attendance: 800; Referee: Səbuhi Bayramov

11 May 2019 28	Neftchi Baku	2 – 3	Qarabağ	Baku
18:00 AZT (UTC+4)	Sansone (yellow card) 21' (goal) 40'; Mahmudov 38' (pen.); Buludov (yellow card) 48'; Abışov (yellow card) 90+4'	Report	Emreli 15', 64' (yellow card) 42'; Garayev (yellow card) 18'; Míchel (yellow card) 37'; Sadygov (yellow card) 42'; Richard (yellow card) 44' (goal) 90'; Medvedev (yellow card) 52'	Stadium: Bakcell Arena; Attendance: 5,000; Referee: Kamal Umudlu

==== League table ====
Pos	Team	Pld	W	D	L	GF	GA	GD	Pts	Qualification or relegation
1	Qarabağ (C)	28	20	6	2	65	21	+44	66	Qualification for the Champions League first qualifying round
2	Neftçi Baku	28	17	7	4	52	26	+26	58	Qualification for the Europa League first qualifying round
3	Sabail	28	12	5	11	34	37	−3	41	Qualification for the Europa League first qualifying round
4	Gabala	28	9	9	10	31	33	−2	36	Qualification for the Europa League second qualifying round
5	Zira	28	8	7	13	30	40	−10	31	

Source: Soccerway
Rules for classification: 1) Points; 2) Head-to-head points; 3) Head-to-head goal difference; 4) Head-to-head goals scored; 5) Head-to-head away goals scored (only if two teams); 6) Goal difference; 7) Goals scored.
(C) Champions

=== Azerbaijan Cup ===
15 December 2018 Second Round 1st leg	Neftchi Baku	0 – 2	Sumgayit	Baku
19:00 AZT (UTC+4)	Aghayev (yellow card) 26'; Akhundov (yellow card) 72'; Hajiyev (yellow card) 86'; A.Krivotsyuk (yellow card) 86' (yellow-red card) 88'	Report	Babayev 28' (pen.); Aliyev (yellow card) 45+1' (goal) 45+1'; Dashdemirov (yellow card) 70'; Hüseynov (yellow card) 79'	Stadium: Bakcell Arena; Attendance: 1,000; Referee: Aliyar Ağayev

19 December 2018 Second Round 2nd leg	Sumgayit	0 – 1 (2 – 1 agg.)	Neftchi Baku	Sumqayit
19:00 AZT (UTC+4)	Dashdemirov (yellow card) 23' (yellow-red card) 85'; E.Babayev (yellow card) 33'; B.Hasanalizade (yellow card) 62'; Hüseynov (yellow card) 84'; Isayev (yellow card) 90+7'	Report	Buludov (yellow card) 28'; Alaskarov 43'; Petrov (yellow card) 85'	Stadium: Kapital Bank Arena; Attendance: 1,200; Referee: Orkhan Məmmədov

=== UEFA Europa League ===
==== Qualifying rounds ====
12 July 2018 Second qualifying round 1st leg	Neftchi Baku (Azerbaijan)	3 – 1	(Hungary) Újpest	Baku, Azerbaijan
21:00 AZT (UTC+4)	Dabo 23', 72' (yellow card) 62'; Makhmudov (yellow card) 66' (goal) 90+2'	Report	Nagy 9'; Litauszki (yellow card) 78'	Stadium: Dalga Arena; Attendance: 4,000; Referee: Dennis Higler (Netherlands)
Note: Neftçi Baku played their home matches at Dalga Arena, Baku, instead of their regular stadium Bakcell Arena, Baku

27 July 2018 Second qualifying round 2nd leg	Újpest (Hungary)	4 – 0 (5 – 3 agg.)	(Azerbaijan) Neftchi Baku	Budapest, Hungary
00:00 AZT (UTC+4)	Litauszki 19'; Sanković 22'; Zsótér 50' (yellow card) 57'; Nwobodo 65'; Diallo (yellow card) 69'	Report	A.Krivotsyuk (yellow card) 30'; Bralić (yellow card) 57'	Stadium: Szusza Ferenc stadion Attendance: 3,738; Referee: Ioannis Papadopoulos (Greece)

== Squad statistics ==
As of Match played 11 May 2019

=== Appearances and goals ===
No.	Pos	Nat	Player	Total		Premier League		Azerbaijan Cup		UEFA Europa League	
No.	Pos	Nat	Player	Apps	Goals	Apps	Goals	Apps	Goals	Apps	Goals
1	GK	(Azerbaijan) AZE	Salahat Aghayev	32	0	28	0	2	0	2	0
3	DF	(Senegal) SEN	Mamadou Mbodj	13	5	13	5	0	0	0	0
4	DF	(Moldova) MDA	Petru Racu	2	0	1+1	0	0	0	0	0
5	DF	(Azerbaijan) AZE	Anton Krivotsyuk	26	3	19+4	3	1	0	2	0
6	MF	(Croatia) CRO	Goran Paracki	26	2	14+8	2	2	0	2	0
7	MF	(Azerbaijan) AZE	Namik Alaskarov	26	4	10+13	3	1+1	1	1	0
8	MF	(Azerbaijan) AZE	Emin Mahmudov	27	9	25+1	8	0	0	0+1	1
9	FW	(France) FRA	Bagaliy Dabo	30	16	26	14	2	0	2	2
11	MF	(Greece) GRE	Vangelis Platellas	13	0	12+1	0	0	0	0	0
15	DF	(Azerbaijan) AZE	Ruslan Abışov	5	1	2+1	1	0	0	2	0
16	FW	(Italy) ITA	Gianluca Sansone	11	2	8+3	2	0	0	0	0
17	MF	(Azerbaijan) AZE	Rahman Hajiyev	19	0	7+8	0	2	0	2	0
18	DF	(Azerbaijan) AZE	Tural Akhundov	27	0	22+3	0	1	0	0+1	0
21	DF	(Azerbaijan) AZE	Mahammad Mirzabeyov	13	0	10	0	1	0	2	0
22	FW	(Azerbaijan) AZE	Mirabdulla Abbasov	31	7	16+12	7	2	0	0+1	0
25	DF	(Ukraine) UKR	Kyrylo Petrov	24	0	20	0	2	0	2	0
26	DF	(Azerbaijan) AZE	Omar Buludov	24	1	20+2	1	2	0	0	0
33	MF	(Azerbaijan) AZE	Turan Valizade	1	0	0+1	0	0	0	0	0
36	MF	(Guinea) GUI	Mamadou Kane	9	0	5+4	0	0	0	0	0
70	DF	(Azerbaijan) AZE	Əli Şirinov	4	0	0+3	0	0+1	0	0	0
77	DF	(Azerbaijan) AZE	Elvin Sarkarov	6	0	0+5	0	0+1	0	0	0
93	MF	(Haiti) HAI	Soni Mustivar	27	0	23	0	2	0	2	0
Players away from Neftchi Baku on loan:
11	FW	(Ghana) GHA	Kwame Karikari	10	2	4+4	2	0	0	0+2	0
Players who left Neftchi Baku during the season:
4	MF	(Azerbaijan) AZE	Rashad Eyyubov	6	0	2+3	0	0+1	0	0	0
10	FW	(Brazil) BRA	Dário	17	3	13+1	3	1	0	2	0
28	DF	(Croatia) CRO	Slavko Bralić	13	0	8+2	0	1	0	1+1	0

=== Goal scorers ===
Place	Position	Nation	Number	Name	Premier League	Azerbaijan Cup	UEFA Europa League	Total
1	FW	(France)	9	Bagaliy Dabo	14	0	2	16
2	MF	(Azerbaijan)	8	Emin Mahmudov	8	0	1	9
3	FW	(Azerbaijan)	22	Mirabdulla Abbasov	7	0	0	7
4	DF	(Senegal)	3	Mamadou Mbodj	5	0	0	5
5	MF	(Azerbaijan)	7	Namik Alaskarov	3	1	0	4
6	FW	(Brazil)	10	Dário	3	0	0	3
6	DF	(Azerbaijan)	5	Anton Krivotsyuk	3	0	0	3
8	MF	(Azerbaijan)	6	Goran Paracki	2	0	0	2
8	FW	(Ghana)	11	Kwame Karikari	2	0	0	2
8	FW	(Italy)	16	Gianluca Sansone	2	0	0	2
11	DF	(Azerbaijan)	26	Omar Buludov	1	0	0	1
11	DF	(Azerbaijan)	15	Ruslan Abışov	1	0	0	1
11				Own goal	1	0	0	1
				TOTALS	48	1	3	52

=== Clean sheets ===
Place	Position	Nation	Number	Name	Premier League	Azerbaijan Cup	UEFA Europa League	Total
1	GK	(Azerbaijan)	1	Səlahət Ağayev	12	1	0	13
				TOTALS	12	1	0	13

=== Disciplinary record ===
Number	Nation	Position	Name	Premier League		Azerbaijan Cup		UEFA Europa League		Total	
Number	Nation	Position	Name	Yellow card	Red card	Yellow card	Red card	Yellow card	Red card	Yellow card	Red card
1	(Azerbaijan)	GK	Salahat Aghayev	2	0	1	0	0	0	3	0
3	(Senegal)	DF	Mamadou Mbodj	4	0	0	0	0	0	4	0
4	(Moldova)	DF	Petru Racu	1	0	0	0	0	0	1	0
5	(Azerbaijan)	DF	Anton Krivotsyuk	9	1	2	1	1	0	11	2
6	(Croatia)	MF	Goran Paracki	3	0	0	0	0	0	3	0
7	(Azerbaijan)	MF	Namik Alaskarov	3	0	0	0	0	0	3	0
8	(Azerbaijan)	MF	Emin Mahmudov	6	0	0	0	1	0	7	0
9	(France)	FW	Bagaliy Dabo	9	1	0	0	1	0	10	1
11	(Greece)	MF	Vangelis Platellas	2	0	0	0	0	0	2	0
15	(Azerbaijan)	DF	Ruslan Abışov	1	0	0	0	0	0	1	0
16	(Italy)	FW	Gianluca Sansone	5	0	0	0	0	0	5	0
17	(Azerbaijan)	MF	Rahman Hajiyev	0	0	1	0	0	0	1	0
18	(Azerbaijan)	DF	Tural Akhundov	7	1	1	0	0	0	8	1
21	(Azerbaijan)	DF	Mahammad Mirzabeyov	3	1	0	0	0	0	3	1
22	(Azerbaijan)	FW	Mirabdulla Abbasov	1	0	0	0	0	0	1	0
25	(Ukraine)	DF	Kyrylo Petrov	6	0	1	0	0	0	7	0
26	(Azerbaijan)	DF	Omar Buludov	6	0	1	0	0	0	7	0
30	(Azerbaijan)	GK	Agil Mammadov	2	0	0	0	0	0	2	0
36	(Guinea)	MF	Mamadou Kane	1	0	0	0	0	0	1	0
70	(Azerbaijan)	DF	Əli Şirinov	1	0	0	0	0	0	1	0
93	(Haiti)	MF	Soni Mustivar	6	0	0	0	0	0	6	0
Players who left Neftchi Baku during the season:
28	(Croatia)	DF	Slavko Bralić	5	1	0	0	1	0	6	1
			TOTALS	83	5	7	1	4	0	94	6
