= 2018–19 Azerbaijan Cup =

Tournament details
- Country: Azerbaijan
- Teams: 12

Final positions
- Champions: Gabala
- Runners-up: Sumgayit

Tournament statistics
- Matches played: 17
- Goals scored: 39 (2.29 per match)
- Top goal scorer: Peyman Babaei (3)

The 2018–19 Azerbaijan Cup was the 27th season of the annual cup competition in Azerbaijan.

== First round ==
6 December 2018 Match 1	Ağsu (2)	0–3	Sabah (1)	Agsu
13:30 AZT (UTC+4)	E.Səmədov (yellow card) 26'; F.Rəhimov (yellow card) 54'	Report	B.Soltanov 6'; Kvashuk 26' (yellow card) 45+1'; V.Abdullayev (yellow card) 34'; E.Qasımov 76'	Stadium: Agsu City Stadium; Attendance: 300; Referee: Kamal Umudlu

6 December 2018 Match 2	Shuvalan (2)	0–3	Keşla (1)	Baku
17:00 AZT (UTC+4)	N.Məmmədov (yellow card) 49'; K.Mirzəliyev (yellow card) 75'; A.Ismayilov (yellow card) 86'	Report	A.Alakbərli 47' (pen.); Javadov 50' (pen.); Guidileye (yellow card) 79'; Clennon 85'	Stadium: AZAL Arena; Attendance: 200; Referee: Orkhan Mammadov

6 December 2018 Match 3	Qaradağ Lökbatan (2)	0–4	Sumgayit (1)	Baku
13:30 AZT (UTC+4)	B.Teymurov (yellow card) 26'; I.Abdullayev (yellow card) 45'; R.Şahmuradov (yellow card) 45'	Report	N.Gurbanov 14'; S.Ahmadov 29'; Mahammadov (yellow card) 39'; U.Iskandarov 69', 86' (yellow card) 90+1'; R.Abdullazadə (yellow card) 90'	Stadium: Lökbatan Olympic Sport Complex Stadium; Attendance: 200; Referee: Alik Yunusov

6 December 2018 Match 4	Kapaz (2)	0–4	Sabail (1)	Ganja
13:30 AZT (UTC+4)		Report	Kitanovski 12'; Koubemba (yellow card) 39'; A.Gurbanli 41'; O.Gurbanli 62'; Ramazanov 77'	Stadium: Ganja City Stadium; Attendance: 500; Referee: Ravan Həmzəzadə

== Quarterfinals ==
16 December 2018 Match 5 1st leg	Gabala (1)	1–0	Sabah (1)	Qabala
14:00 AZT (UTC+4)	Ivanović 45' (o.g.)	Report	Ivanović (yellow card) 59'	Stadium: Gabala City Stadium; Attendance: 150; Referee: Ravan Həmzəzadə

20 December 2018 Match 5 2nd leg	Sabah (1)	0–1 (0–2 agg.)	Gabala (1)	Masazır
16:00 AZT (UTC+4)	S.Seyidov (yellow card) 35'; E.Nabiyev (yellow card) 39'; V.Abdullayev (yellow card) 45'; Ramos (yellow card) 53' (yellow-red card) 83'; E.Turabov (yellow card) 67'	Report	Joseph-Monrose (yellow card) 9'; Adeniyi (yellow card) 44' (goal) 80'	Stadium: Alinja Arena; Attendance: 400; Referee: Aliyar Aghayev

16 December 2018 Match 6 1st leg	Qarabağ (1)	1–0	Keşla (1)	Baku
19:00 AZT (UTC+4)	Quintana (yellow card) 43'; Mammadov 65'	Report	Ayité (yellow card) 33'; Guliyev (yellow card) 90+4'; S.Tashkin (yellow card) 90+4'	Stadium: Tofiq Bahramov Republican Stadium; Attendance: 400; Referee: Vugar Həsənli

20 December 2018 Match 6 2nd leg	Keşla (1)	1–1 (1–2 agg.)	Qarabağ (1)	Baku
19:00 AZT (UTC+4)	Yunanov 29'; S.Alkhasov (yellow card) 55'; S.Əsədov (yellow card) 71'	Report	Madatov (yellow card) 22'; Sadygov (yellow card) 36'; Agolli (yellow card) 36'; Míchel 48' (yellow card) 72'; Rzeźniczak (yellow card) 53' (yellow-red card) 89'; Medvedev (yellow card) 62'; Ozobić (yellow card) 78'	Stadium: ASK Arena; Attendance: 600; Referee: Ingilab Mammadov

15 December 2018 Match 7 1st leg	Neftchi Baku (1)	0–2	Sumgayit (1)	Baku
19:00 AZT (UTC+4)	Aghayev (yellow card) 26'; Akhundov (yellow card) 72'; Hajiyev (yellow card) 86'; A.Krivotsyuk (yellow card) 86' (yellow-red card) 88'	Report	Babayev 28' (pen.); Aliyev (yellow card) 45+1' (goal) 45+1'; Dashdemirov (yellow card) 70'; Hüseynov (yellow card) 79'	Stadium: Bakcell Arena; Attendance: 1,000; Referee: Aliyar Ağayev

19 December 2018 Match 7 2nd leg	Sumgayit (1)	0–1 (2–1 agg.)	Neftchi Baku (1)	Sumqayit
19:00 AZT (UTC+4)	Dashdemirov (yellow card) 23' (yellow-red card) 85'; Babayev (yellow card) 33'; B.Hasanalizade (yellow card) 62'; Hüseynov (yellow card) 84'; Isayev (yellow card) 90+7'	Report	Buludov (yellow card) 28'; Alaskarov 43'; Petrov (yellow card) 85'	Stadium: Kapital Bank Arena; Attendance: 1,200; Referee: Orkhan Məmmədov

15 December 2018 Match 8 1st leg	Zira (1)	1–0	Sabail (1)	Baku
17:00 AZT (UTC+4)	Dedov (yellow card) 16'; Muradov 45'; Scarlatache (yellow card) 49'	Report	Kitanovski (red card) 33'; Jarjué (yellow card) 59'; Gurbanov (yellow card) 65'; Cociuc (yellow card) 86'	Stadium: Dalga Arena; Attendance: 200; Referee: Alik Yunusov

19 December 2018 Match 8 2nd leg	Sabail (1)	2–3 (2–4 agg.)	Zira (1)	Baku
16:00 AZT (UTC+4)	Scarlatache 3' (o.g.); Rahimov (yellow card) 71'; Gurbanov 83'; A.Gurbanli (yellow card) 90+3'	Report	Naghiyev 45+2', 74' (yellow card) 74'; Tounkara (yellow card) 47'; Fardjad-Azad 63' (yellow card) 90+2'	Stadium: Bayil Arena; Attendance: 350; Referee: Ravan Həmzəzadə

== Semifinals ==
23 April 2019 Match 9 1st leg	Sumgayit (1)	0 – 0	Zira (1)	Sumqayit
18:30 AZT (UTC+4)	Mammadov (yellow card) 32'	Report	Rodríguez (yellow card) 25'; Tounkara (yellow card) 46'	Stadium: Kapital Bank Arena; Attendance: 1,100; Referee: Sabuhi Bayramov

1 May 2019 Match 9 2nd leg	Zira (1)	3 – 3 (3 – 3 a agg.)	Sumgayit (1)	Baku
20:00 AZT (UTC+4)	I.Muradov (yellow card) 28'; Fardjad-Azad 47'; Scarlatache (yellow card) 78'; Rodríguez 84'; Hamdi (yellow card) 90+1'; Tigroudja 90+4'	Report	Hüseynov (yellow card) 7'; Babaei 20', 28', 45'; Isayev (yellow card) 74'; Jannatov (yellow card) 89'	Stadium: Dalga Arena; Attendance: 1,000

23 April 2019 Match 10 1st leg	Gabala (1)	1 – 0	Qarabağ (1)	Qabala
16:00 AZT (UTC+4)	A.Seydiyev (yellow card) 29'; Joseph-Monrose (yellow card) 39'; Adeniyi 72'; Lilaj (yellow card) 85'; Aliyev (yellow card) 87'	Report	Madatov (yellow card) 35'; Zoubir (yellow card) 84'	Stadium: Gabala City Stadium; Attendance: 1,800; Referee: Vugar Hasanli

1 May 2019 Match 10 2nd leg	Qarabağ (1)	2 – 1 (2 – 2 a agg.)	Gabala (1)	Baku
17:00 AZT (UTC+4)	Madatov (yellow card) 30'; Míchel 37' (red card) 90+5'; Quintana 58'	Report	Huseynov (yellow card) 20'; Stanković (yellow card) 49'; A.Seydiyev (yellow card) 65'; Volkovi 82'; Lilaj (yellow card) 83'; Atakora (yellow card) 85'; Nazirov (yellow card) 90+1'	Stadium: Tofiq Bahramov Republican Stadium; Attendance: 2,000; Referee: İnqilab Məmmədov

== Final ==
19 May 2019
16:30 AZT (UTC+4)

Gabala (1)	1 – 0	(1) Sumgayit
Joseph-Monrose 3' (yellow card) 90+5'; R.Aliyev (yellow card) 45'; Nazirov (yellow card) 90+2'; B.Mustafazade (yellow card) 90+6'	Report	Naghiyev (yellow card) 60'; Y.Nabiyev (yellow card) 70'; Hüseynov (yellow card) 90+1'; Taghiyev (red card) 90+5'

Nakhchivan City Stadium, Nakhchivan
Attendance: 10,000
Referee: İnqilab Məmmədov

== Scorers ==
As of match played 19 May 2019

3 goals:

- (Iran) Peyman Babaei - Sumgayit

2 goals:

- (Nigeria) James Adeniyi - Gabala
- (Azerbaijan) Ulvi Iskandarov - Sumgayit
- (Azerbaijan) Pardis Fardjad-Azad - Zira
- (Azerbaijan) Adil Naghiyev - Zira

1 goals:

- (Azerbaijan) Davit Volkovi - Gabala
- (France) Steeven Joseph-Monrose - Gabala
- (Azerbaijan) Azamat Alakbərli - Keşla
- (Azerbaijan) Vagif Javadov - Keşla
- (Jamaica) Andre Clennon - Keşla
- (Azerbaijan) Namik Alaskarov - Neftchi Baku
- (Azerbaijan) Rahil Mammadov - Qarabağ
- (Spain) Míchel - Qarabağ
- (Spain) Dani Quintana - Qarabağ
- (Azerbaijan) Emil Qasımov - Sabah
- (Azerbaijan) Bakhtiyar Soltanov - Sabah
- (Ukraine) Vitaliy Kvashuk - Sabah
- (Azerbaijan) Agshin Gurbanli - Sabail
- (Azerbaijan) Orsan Gurbanli - Sabail
- (Azerbaijan) Ruslan Gurbanov - Sabail
- (Azerbaijan) Aghabala Ramazanov - Sabail
- (North Macedonia) Tome Kitanovski - Sabail
- (Azerbaijan) Suleyman Ahmadov - Sumgayit
- (Azerbaijan) Shahriyar Aliyev - Sumgayit
- (Azerbaijan) Pardis Fardjad-Azad - Sumgayit
- (Azerbaijan) Nijat Gurbanov - Sumgayit
- (Azerbaijan) Ali Babayev - Sumgayit
- (Azerbaijan) Ilkin Muradov - Zira
- (France) Chafik Tigroudja - Zira
- (Paraguay) Julio Rodríguez - Zira

Own goals:

- (Serbia) Filip Ivanović (16 December 2018 vs Gabala)
- (Romania) Adrian Scarlatache (19 December 2018 vs Sabail)
