= 2018–19 Azerbaijan Premier League =

Azerbaijan Premier League
- Season: 2018–19
- Dates: 11 August 2018 – 11 May 2019
- Champions: Qarabağ
- Champions League: Qarabağ
- Europa League: Neftçi Baku; Sabail
- Matches: 112
- Goals: 285 (2.54 per match)
- Top goalscorer: Mahir Emreli (16 goals)
- Biggest home win: Qarabağ 5–1 Keşla (3 December 2018)
- Biggest away win: Zira 0–6 Qarabağ (9 December 2018)
- Highest scoring: Zira 0–6 Qarabağ (9 December 2018)
- All statistics correct as of 11 May 2019.

The 2018–19 Azerbaijan Premier League was the 27th season of the Azerbaijan Premier League. It was won by the defending champions Qarabağ, for their sixth consecutive championship title. The season began on 11 August 2018.

The winner of the league this season earned a spot in the first qualifying round of the 2019–20 Champions League, and the second and third placed clubs earned a place in the first qualifying round of the 2019–20 Europa League.

== Teams ==
Kapaz was relegated at the conclusion of the previous season. Sabah were promoted and participated in the Premier League this season.

Locations of the 2018–19 Azerbaijan Premier League teams.
Team in italics is from a zone of the Nagorno-Karabakh conflict and is playing its home games in Baku.

=== Stadia and locations ===
Note: Table lists in alphabetical order.

Team	Year Established	Location	Venue	Capacity
Gabala	1995	Qabala	Gabala City Stadium	4,500
Keşla	1997	Keshla	ASK Arena	8,125
Neftchi Baku	1937	Baku	Bakcell Arena	10,500
Qarabağ	1951	Aghdam	Azersun Arena {Baku}	5,800
Sabah	2017	Baku	Alinja Arena	13,000
Sabail	2016	Səbail	Bayil Arena	5,000
Sumgayit	2010	Sumqayit	Kapital Bank Arena	1,500
Zira	2014	Zira	Zira Olympic Sport Complex Stadium	1,400

=== Stadiums ===
Gabala	Keşla	Neftchi Baku	Qarabağ
Gabala City Stadium	ASK Arena	Bakcell Arena	Azersun Arena
Capacity: **4,500**	Capacity: **8,200**	Capacity: **10,500**	Capacity: **5,800**
Sabah	Sabail	Sumgayit	Zira
Alinja Arena	Bayil Arena	Kapital Bank Arena	Zira Olympic Sport Complex Stadium
Capacity: **13,000**	Capacity: **3,200**	Capacity: **1,500**	Capacity: **1,400**

=== Personnel and kits ===
Note: Flags indicate national team as has been defined under FIFA eligibility rules. Players may hold more than one non-FIFA nationality.

Team	Manager	Team captain	Kit manufacturer	Shirt sponsor
Gabala	(Azerbaijan) Sanan Gurbanov	(Azerbaijan) Javid Huseynov	Joma	QafqaZ Hotels
Keşla	(Azerbaijan) Tarlan Ahmedov	(Azerbaijan) Kamran Aghayev	Joma	Samaya LTD
Neftchi Baku	(Italy) Roberto Bordin	(Azerbaijan) Ruslan Abışov	Nike	
Qarabağ	(Azerbaijan) Gurban Gurbanov	(Azerbaijan) Rashad Sadygov	Adidas	Azersun Holding
Sabah	(Azerbaijan) Elshad Ahmadov	(Azerbaijan) Javid Imamverdiyev	Macron	Bank Respublika
Sabail	(Azerbaijan) Aftandil Hajiyev	(Azerbaijan) Rahid Amirguliyev	Macron	AzTea
Sumgayit	(Azerbaijan) Aykhan Abbasov	(Azerbaijan) Vurğun Hüseynov	Macron	Pasha Insurance
Zira	(Azerbaijan) Samir Abbasov	(Azerbaijan) Kamal Bayramov	Joma	Santral Electric

=== Foreign players ===
A team could use only six foreign players on the field in each game.

Club	Player 1	Player 2	Player 3	Player 4	Player 5	Player 6	Player 7	Player 8	Player 9	Player 10	Player 11	Player 12
Gabala	(Albania) **Sabien Lilaj**	(France) Steeven Joseph-Monrose	(Nigeria) James Adeniyi	(Serbia) **Vojislav Stanković**	(Togo) **Lalawélé Atakora**	(Ukraine) Dmytro Bezotosnyi						
Keşla	(Brazil) Denis Silva	(Ukraine) Valeriy Kutsenko	(Sierra Leone) **John Kamara**	(Jamaica) **Andre Clennon**	(Lithuania) **Edvinas Girdvainis**	(Serbia) **Nikola Mitrović**	(Togo) **Jonathan Ayite**	(Venezuela) **Angelo Pena**				
Neftchi	(Italy) Gianluca Sansone	(Croatia) Goran Paracki	(Senegal) Mamadou Mbodj	(France) Bagaliy Dabo	(Greece) **Vangelis Platellas**	(Haiti) **Soni Mustivar**	(Ukraine) Kyrylo Petrov	(Moldova) **Petru Racu**				
Qarabağ	(Albania) **Ansi Agolli**	(Brazil) Vagner	(Bulgaria) **Simeon Slavchev**	(Republic of the Congo) **Dzon Delarge**	(Croatia) **Filip Ozobić**	(France) Abdellah Zoubir	(Haiti) **Donald Guerrier**	(Iceland) **Hannes Halldórsson**	(Poland) **Jakub Rzeźniczak**	(Spain) Dani Quintana	(Spain) Míchel	(Switzerland) **Innocent Emeghara**
Sabah	(Brazil) Wanderson	(Paraguay) **Éric Ramos**	(Serbia) Filip Ivanović	(Serbia) Saša Stamenković	(Ukraine) **Marko Dević**	(Ukraine) Vitaliy Kvashuk						
Sabail	(Argentina) Imanol Iriberri	(Bulgaria) Emil Martinov	(Republic of the Congo) **Kévin Koubemba**	(Georgia (country)) Tamaz Tsetskhladze	(Guinea-Bissau) Maudo Jarjué	(North Macedonia) **Tome Kitanovski**	(Ukraine) **Oleksandr Rybka**	(Moldova) **Eugeniu Cociuc**	(Ukraine) Ihor Korotetskyi	(Ghana) **Michael Essien**		
Sumgayit	(Israel) Ali Babayev	(Turkey) Atilla Yıldırım	(Israel) Amir Agayev	(Russia) Aleksey Isayev	(Iran) Peyman Babaei							
Zira	(Algeria) Bilal Hamdi	(France) Dylan Duventru	(Mali) Sadio Tounkara	(Moldova) **Alexandru Dedov**	(Romania) Adrian Scarlatache	(Serbia) Miloš Radivojević	(Malawi) **Robin Ngalande**	(Botswana) **Mpho Kgaswane**				

In bold: Players that capped for their national team.

=== Managerial changes ===
Team	Outgoing manager	Manner of departure	Date of vacancy	Position in table	Incoming manager	Date of appointmentr
Gabala	(Ukraine) Roman Hryhorchuk	End of contract	29 May 2018	Pre-season	(Azerbaijan) Sanan Gurbanov	30 May 2018
Neftchi Baku	(Azerbaijan) Tarlan Ahmedov	End of contract	31 May 2018	Pre-season	(Italy) Roberto Bordin	8 June 2018
Sabail	(Azerbaijan) Samir Aliyev	Mutual consent	22 May 2018	Pre-season	(Azerbaijan) Aftandil Hajiyev	11 June 2018
Sumgayit	(Azerbaijan) Samir Abbasov	End of contract	20 May 2018	Pre-season	(Azerbaijan) Nazim Suleymanov	7 June 2018
Sabah	(Azerbaijan) Arif Asadov	End of contract		Pre-season	(Azerbaijan) Elshad Ahmadov	
Keşla	(Ukraine) Yuriy Maksymov	Sacked	17 July 2018	Pre-season	(Serbia) Mladen Milinković	25 July 2018
Zira	(Azerbaijan) Aykhan Abbasov	Resignation	29 August 2018	8th	(Azerbaijan) Samir Abbasov	29 August 2018
Keşla	(Serbia) Mladen Milinković	Sacked	29 October 2018	7th	(Azerbaijan) Tarlan Ahmadov	30 October 2018

== League table ==
Pos	Team	Pld	W	D	L	GF	GA	GD	Pts	Qualification or relegation
1	Qarabağ (C)	28	20	6	2	65	21	+44	66	Qualification for the Champions League first qualifying round
2	Neftçi Baku	28	17	7	4	52	26	+26	58	Qualification for the Europa League first qualifying round
3	Sabail	28	12	5	11	34	37	−3	41	Qualification for the Europa League first qualifying round
4	Gabala	28	9	9	10	31	33	−2	36	Qualification for the Europa League second qualifying round
5	Zira	28	8	7	13	30	40	−10	31	
6	Sumgayit	28	8	5	15	24	42	−18	29	
7	Sabah	28	7	6	15	20	41	−21	27	
8	Keşla	28	6	5	17	29	45	−16	23	

Source: Soccerway
Rules for classification: 1) Points; 2) Head-to-head points; 3) Head-to-head goal difference; 4) Head-to-head goals scored; 5) Head-to-head away goals scored (only if two teams); 6) Goal difference; 7) Goals scored.
(C) Champions

=== Positions by round ===
Team ╲ Round	1	2	3	4	5	6	7	8	9	10	11	12	13	14	15	16	17	18	19	20	21	22	23	24	25	26	27	28
Qarabağ	3	1	1	2	1	2	2	2	2	2	2	2	2	2	2	2	2	1	1	2	1	1	1	1	1	1	1	1
Neftçi Baku	2	2	2	1	2	1	1	1	1	1	1	1	1	1	1	1	1	2	2	1	2	2	2	2	2	2	2	2
Sabail	8	8	6	4	5	5	4	3	3	3	3	3	3	3	3	3	3	3	3	3	3	3	3	3	3	3	3	3
Gabala	1	3	4	5	6	6	6	6	6	5	5	5	5	4	4	4	4	4	4	4	4	4	4	4	4	4	4	4
Zira	5	6	8	8	8	8	7	8	8	8	8	8	7	8	8	7	8	6	6	7	5	6	6	6	6	6	5	5
Sumgayit	7	4	5	6	4	3	3	5	5	6	6	6	6	6	6	6	7	8	8	8	8	8	7	7	7	7	7	6
Sabah	4	5	3	3	3	4	5	4	4	4	4	4	4	5	5	5	5	5	5	5	6	5	5	5	5	5	6	7
Keşla	6	7	7	7	7	7	8	7	7	7	7	7	8	7	7	8	6	7	7	6	7	7	8	8	8	8	8	8

Leader and Champions League first qualifying round
Europa League first qualifying round
Europa League second qualifying round

== Results ==
Clubs played each other four times for a total of 28 matches each.

=== Games 1–14 ===
Home \ Away	GAB	KES	NEF	QAR	SAB	SEB	SUM	ZIR
Gabala	—	1–1	3–1	1–3	2–1	3–0	1–1	0–0
Keşla	1–2	—	0–1	1–1	0–1	1–2	1–2	1–0
Neftçi Baku	2–1	2–0	—	3–1	2–0	4–0	0–0	2–2
Qarabağ	4–1	5–1	1–1	—	1–1	0–3	1–0	3–2
Sabah	1–0	1–2	1–2	0–2	—	0–4	1–4	2–1
Sabail	0–0	2–1	0–2	0–2	0–0	—	2–0	3–0
Sumgayit	2–2	1–4	0–2	0–2	0–1	1–0	—	1–0
Zira	1–0	2–2	1–2	0–6	0–2	0–0	3–1	—

Legend: Blue = home team win; Yellow = draw; Red = away team win.

=== Games 15–28 ===
Home \ Away	GAB	KES	NEF	QAR	SAB	SEB	SUM	ZIR
Gabala	—	0–0	1–3	1–2	0–0	2–1	1–0	2–1
Keşla	1–2	—	0–1	0–1	3–0	0–3	2–1	1–3
Neftçi Baku	1–1	2–0	—	2–3	3–0	1–2	2–3	4–2
Qarabağ	2–1	3–0	1–1	—	3–0	4–0	2–0	0–0
Sabah	0–1	1–1	0–2	1–1	—	3–1	1–1	0–3
Sabail	2–1	1–4	2–2	1–2	1–0	—	0–0	0–2
Sumgayit	1–0	2–1	1–2	0–6	1–0	1–2	—	0–1
Zira	1–1	2–0	0–0	0–3	0–2	1–2	2–0	—

Legend: Blue = home team win; Yellow = draw; Red = away team win.

== Season statistics ==
=== Top scorers ===
As of match played 11 May 2019

Rank	Player	Club	Goals
1	(Azerbaijan) Mahir Emreli	Qarabağ	16
2	(France) Bagaliy Dabo	Neftçi Baku	14
3	(Nigeria) James Adeniyi	Gabala	10
4	(Ukraine) Marko Dević	Sabah	8
4	(Croatia) Filip Ozobić	Qarabağ	8
6	(Azerbaijan) Mirabdulla Abbasov	Neftçi Baku	7
6	(Azerbaijan) Emin Mahmudov	Neftçi Baku	7
6	(Spain) Dani Quintana	Qarabağ	7
6	(France) Abdellah Zoubir	Qarabağ	7
10	(France) Steeven Joseph-Monrose	Gabala	6
10	(Paraguay) Julio Rodríguez	Zira	6

=== Hat-tricks ===
Player	For	Against	Result	Date	Ref.
(Azerbaijan) Mahir Emreli	Qarabağ	Keşla	5–1	3 December 2018	
(Spain) Dani Quintana	Qarabağ	Zira	6–0	9 December 2018	
(Azerbaijan) Mahir Emreli	Qarabağ	Sabail	4–0	5 May 2019	

=== Clean sheets ===
As of match played 11 May 2019

Rank	Player	Club	Clean sheets
1	(Azerbaijan) Salahat Aghayev	Neftçi	12
2	(Brazil) Vagner da Silva	Qarabağ	10
3	(Ukraine) Dmytro Bezotosnyi	Gabala	8
4	(Azerbaijan) Emil Balayev	Sabail	7
4	(Serbia) Saša Stamenković	Sabah	7

=== Scoring ===
- First goal of the season: Mirabdulla Abbasov for Neftçi Baku against Sumgayit. (11 August 2018)

== See also ==
- Azerbaijan Premier League
- Azerbaijan First Division
