= List of Azerbaijan football transfers winter 2018–19 =

This is a list of Azerbaijan football transfers in the winter transfer window. Only clubs of the 2018–19 Azerbaijan Premier League are included.

== Azerbaijan Premier League 2018-19 ==
=== Gabala ===
In: Note: Flags indicate national team as defined under FIFA eligibility rules; some limited exceptions apply. Players may hold more than one non-FIFA nationality.

No.	Pos.	Nation	Player
1	GK	AZE	Anar Nazirov (from (Azerbaijan) Zira)
9	FW	GEO	Davit Volkovi (from (Georgia (country)) Saburtalo Tbilisi)

Out: Note: Flags indicate national team as defined under FIFA eligibility rules; some limited exceptions apply. Players may hold more than one non-FIFA nationality.

No.	Pos.	Nation	Player
29	MF	AZE	Hajiagha Hajili (to (Azerbaijan) Qarabağ)
30	GK	AZE	Agil Mammadov (to (Azerbaijan) Neftchi Baku)
33	MF	AZE	Tamkin Khalilzade (to (Azerbaijan) Sabah)

=== Keşla ===
In: Note: Flags indicate national team as defined under FIFA eligibility rules; some limited exceptions apply. Players may hold more than one non-FIFA nationality.

No.	Pos.	Nation	Player
11	MF	AZE	Vusal Isgandarli (from (Azerbaijan) Zira)
21	MF	VEN	Ángelo Peña (from (Venezuela) Mineros de Guayana)
25	MF	AZE	John Kamara (from (Kazakhstan) Kaisar)
32	MF	UKR	Valeriy Kutsenko (from (Moldova) Speranța Nisporeni)

Out: Note: Flags indicate national team as defined under FIFA eligibility rules; some limited exceptions apply. Players may hold more than one non-FIFA nationality.

No.	Pos.	Nation	Player
11	FW	UZB	Bahodir Nasimov (to (Uzbekistan) Navbahor Namangan)
15	GK	AZE	Orkhan Sadigli (to (Azerbaijan) Zira)
21	MF	CMR	Hervé Tchami
31	MF	GRE	Giorgos Georgiadis (to (Turkey) Elazığspor)
80	MF	MTN	Diallo Guidileye (to (Turkey) Elazığspor)
88	MF	AZE	Mammad Guliyev
90	MF	GAM	Ebrima Sohna
97	FW	AZE	Elnur Jafarov

=== Neftchi Baku ===
In: Note: Flags indicate national team as defined under FIFA eligibility rules; some limited exceptions apply. Players may hold more than one non-FIFA nationality.

No.	Pos.	Nation	Player
3	DF	SEN	Mamadou Mbodj (from (Lithuania) Žalgiris)
4	DF	MDA	Petru Racu (from (Moldova) Sheriff Tiraspol)
11	MF	GRE	Vangelis Platellas (from (Greece) OFI Crete)
16	FW	ITA	Gianluca Sansone (from (Italy) Novara)
30	GK	AZE	Agil Mammadov (from (Azerbaijan) Gabala)
33	MF	AZE	Turan Valizada (from (Turkey) Fenerbahçe)
36	MF	GUI	Mamadou Kane (from (Guinea) Kaloum Star)

Out: Note: Flags indicate national team as defined under FIFA eligibility rules; some limited exceptions apply. Players may hold more than one non-FIFA nationality.

No.	Pos.	Nation	Player
4	MF	AZE	Rashad Eyyubov (to (Azerbaijan) Sabah)
10	FW	BRA	Dário (to (South Korea) Daegu)
28	DF	CRO	Slavko Bralić (to (Greece) AEL)
94	GK	AZE	Rashad Azizli (to (Azerbaijan) Sumgayit)
—	FW	ARG	Lucas Gómez

=== Qarabağ ===
In: Note: Flags indicate national team as defined under FIFA eligibility rules; some limited exceptions apply. Players may hold more than one non-FIFA nationality.

No.	Pos.	Nation	Player
20	MF	AZE	Richard Almeida (loan from (Kazakhstan) Astana)
21	MF	AZE	Hajiagha Hajili (from (Azerbaijan) Gabala)
99	MF	BRA	Reynaldo (from (Kazakhstan) Aktobe)

Out: Note: Flags indicate national team as defined under FIFA eligibility rules; some limited exceptions apply. Players may hold more than one non-FIFA nationality.

No.	Pos.	Nation	Player
91	MF	AZE	Joshgun Diniyev (to (Azerbaijan) Sabah)
—	MF	AZE	Rafael Məhərrəmli (to (Azerbaijan) Zira)

=== Sabah ===
In: Note: Flags indicate national team as defined under FIFA eligibility rules; some limited exceptions apply. Players may hold more than one non-FIFA nationality.

No.	Pos.	Nation	Player
7	MF	AZE	Rashad Eyyubov (from (Azerbaijan) Neftchi Baku)
33	MF	AZE	Tamkin Khalilzade (from (Azerbaijan) Gabala)
91	MF	AZE	Joshgun Diniyev (from (Azerbaijan) Qarabağ)

Out: Note: Flags indicate national team as defined under FIFA eligibility rules; some limited exceptions apply. Players may hold more than one non-FIFA nationality.

No.	Pos.	Nation	Player
2	DF	AZE	Ulvi İbazade
3	DF	AZE	Elvin Badalov
7	FW	UKR	Vitaliy Kvashuk (to (Belarus) Gomel)
14	FW	AZE	Tural Gurbatov
32	DF	AZE	Elvin Yunuszade (to (Azerbaijan) Sabail)
39	MF	AZE	Alibey Mammadli
96	GK	AZE	Aydin Bayramov (to (Azerbaijan) Sumgayit)

=== Sabail ===
In: Note: Flags indicate national team as defined under FIFA eligibility rules; some limited exceptions apply. Players may hold more than one non-FIFA nationality.

No.	Pos.	Nation	Player
1	GK	UKR	Oleksandr Rybka (from (Turkey) Afjet Afyonspor)
9	FW	ARG	Imanol Iriberri (from (Venezuela) Deportivo La Guaira)
21	FW	NGA	Oke Akpoveta (from (Sweden) AFC Eskilstuna)
32	DF	AZE	Elvin Yunuszade (from (Azerbaijan) Sabah)

Out: Note: Flags indicate national team as defined under FIFA eligibility rules; some limited exceptions apply. Players may hold more than one non-FIFA nationality.

No.	Pos.	Nation	Player
1	GK	AZE	Emil Balayev (from (Kazakhstan) Tobol)
22	MF	MEX	Édgar Pacheco

=== Sumgayit ===
In: Note: Flags indicate national team as defined under FIFA eligibility rules; some limited exceptions apply. Players may hold more than one non-FIFA nationality.

No.	Pos.	Nation	Player
5	DF	AZE	Adil Naghiyev (from (Azerbaijan) Zira)
8	FW	IRN	Peyman Babaei (loan from (Iran) Machine Sazi)
12	GK	AZE	Rashad Azizli (from (Azerbaijan) Neftchi Baku)
13	GK	AZE	Aydin Bayramov (from (Azerbaijan) Sabah)
15	MF	ISR	Amir Agayev (from (Israel) Hapoel Tel Aviv)
50	DF	IRN	Peyman Keshavarz (from (Iran) Gostaresh Foulad)

Out: Note: Flags indicate national team as defined under FIFA eligibility rules; some limited exceptions apply. Players may hold more than one non-FIFA nationality.

No.	Pos.	Nation	Player
14	DF	AZE	Bakhtiyar Hasanalizade (to (Azerbaijan) Zira)

=== Zira ===
In: Note: Flags indicate national team as defined under FIFA eligibility rules; some limited exceptions apply. Players may hold more than one non-FIFA nationality.

No.	Pos.	Nation	Player
1	GK	AZE	Orkhan Sadigli (from (Azerbaijan) Keşla)
17	FW	MWI	Robin Ngalande (from (South Africa) Baroka)
18	FW	PAR	Julio Rodríguez (from (Paraguay) Deportivo Capiatá)
20	FW	CIV	Béko Fofana (from (Serbia) Vojvodina)
23	MF	BOT	Mpho Kgaswane (from (South Africa) Baroka)
48	MF	FRA	Chafik Tigroudja (from (Albania) Kukësi)
99	MF	AZE	Rafael Məhərrəmli (from (Azerbaijan) Qarabağ)

Out: Note: Flags indicate national team as defined under FIFA eligibility rules; some limited exceptions apply. Players may hold more than one non-FIFA nationality.

No.	Pos.	Nation	Player
1	GK	AZE	Anar Nazirov (to (Azerbaijan) Gabala)
5	DF	AZE	Adil Naghiyev (to (Azerbaijan) Sumgayit)
17	MF	AZE	Vusal Isgandarli (to (Azerbaijan) Keşla)
