= Adilkhan Garahmadov =

Azerbaijani footballer (born 2001)

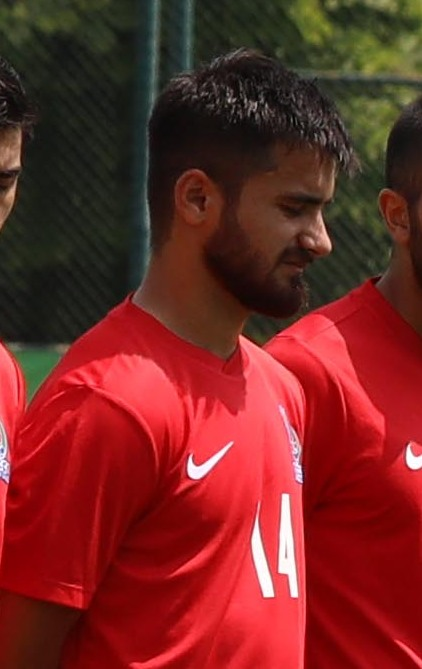
- Garahmadov in 2022

Personal information
- Full name: Adilkhan Anar oglu Garahmadov
- Date of birth: 5 June 2001 (age 25)
- Place of birth: Azerbaijan
- Height: 1.80 m (5 ft 11 in)
- Position: Midfielder

Team information
- Current team: Kapaz
- Number: 47

Senior career*
Years	Team	Apps	(Gls)
2018–2023	Sabail	57	(1)
2023–2024	Iravan		
2024–	Kapaz	0	(0)

International career^{‡}
2019	Azerbaijan U19	3	(0)
2021–2022	Azerbaijan U21	9	(0)
Medal record
Men's football
Representing Azerbaijan
Islamic Solidarity Games
Bronze medal – third place	2021 Konya
- * Club domestic league appearances and goals as of 20 February 2024 ‡ National team caps and goals as of 4 May 2023

Adilkhan Garahmadov (Azerbaijani: Ədilxan Qarəhmədov; born 5 June 2001) is an Azerbaijani footballer who plays as a midfielder for Kapaz in the Azerbaijan Premier League.

== Club career ==
On 2 March 2019, Garahmadov made his debut in the Azerbaijan Premier League for Sabail in a match against Sumgayit.

On 8 February 2024, Kapaz announced the signing of Garahmadov from Iravan on a contract until the end of the season with an option for an additional year.
