= Édgar Pacheco =

Mexican footballer (born 1990)

Edgar Pacheco
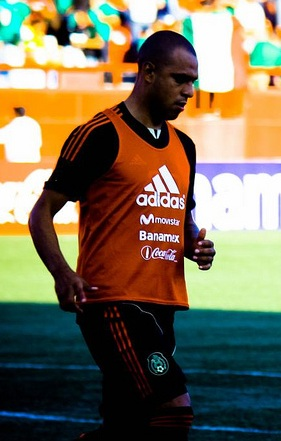

Personal information
- Full name: Edgar Iván Pacheco Rodríguez
- Date of birth: 22 January 1990 (age 36)
- Place of birth: Guadalajara, Jalisco, Mexico
- Height: 1.73 m (5 ft 8 in)
- Position: Midfielder

Senior career*
Years	Team	Apps	(Gls)
2008–2011	Atlas	87	(12)
2011–2015	Tigres UANL	16	(0)
2012–2013	→ León (loan)	9	(1)
2014	→ Zacatecas (loan)	14	(1)
2015	→ Querétaro (loan)	11	(1)
2015	→ Juárez (loan)	22	(4)
2016	Gangwon FC	1	(0)
2016–2017	Al-Najma	15	(4)
2017–2018	Ermis Aradippou	16	(1)
2018	Doxa Katokopias	0	(0)
2018–2019	Sabail	8	(0)
2019	Antigua	20	(2)

International career
2011	Mexico U23	4	(0)
2009–2011	Mexico	5	(1)
- * Club domestic league appearances and goals as of 29 July 2020

Edgar Iván Pacheco Rodríguez (Note: In this Spanish name, the first or paternal surname is Pacheco and the second or maternal family name is Rodríguez.) (born 22 January 1990) is a Mexican professional footballer who last played for club Antigua GFC, as a midfielder.

== Club career ==
=== Atlas ===
Pacheco made his club debut on 20 January 2008 in a game against Club Toluca. After his debut, he was used sparingly until the return of coach Ricardo La Volpe to Atlas. Thereafter, he got more playing time and became a favorite of La Volpe's. He is known for his speed, reflexes, shooting ability, and sacrifice on both the offensive and defensive sides. He is also known for his ability to play through the left, middle, and right sides of the field ranging from defensive, recovery, creative and offensive positions.

On 31 January 2010 he played as a goalkeeper against Santos Laguna after Atlas goalkeeper Mariano Barbosa was sent off for a foul. He allowed one goal, but made a crucial save in the game. The final score was a 2–1 victory for Atlas. Pacheco would go on to play with the "Rojinegros" for another 3 years, making 94 appearances and scoring 11 goals. His last season with the club would be the 2011 Clausura.

=== Tigres UANL ===
In June 2011 Pacheco was being linked to various clubs in Europe, most notably with Portuguese club Benfica. It was reported that MLS club Houston Dynamo wanted to sign Pacheco, but the deal fell through at the last minute, with the player stating that he did not want to play in the MLS.

Mexican giants Club América and Chivas Guadalajara were also rumored as possible destinations. On 2 June 2011 he signed a $4 million contract with Tigres UANL. Pacheco played his first match with UANL on 30 July, in a 0–0 draw against Querétaro, coming in a substitute in the 76th minute.

=== FC Juárez ===
Pacheco made his official debut with FC Juárez on 25 July 2015. At the 57' minute Pacheco score via penalty the first-ever goal of the franchise against Lobos BUAP. Being the Captain of the border set arriving until the end and raising the title of champion that same season 2015.

=== Abroad ===
Pacheco joined K League Challenge side Gangwon FC on 28 January 2016. On 25 May, he made his first team debut in a 1–0 victory against Goyang Zaicro. On 8 January 2017, he switched to Bahraini club Al-Najma.

On 8 July 2017, Pacheco moved to Cypriot First Division side Ermis Aradippou on a free transfer.

On 8 August 2018, Pacheco signed contract with Azerbaijan Premier League side Sabail FK. On 7 December 2018, after 8 appearances for Sabail, Pacheco left the club by mutual consent.

== International career ==
Pacheco was called up by then-national team coach Javier Aguirre for a friendly match against Colombia. He made his debut on 30 September 2009.

He would be called up again by new coach José Manuel de la Torre for a friendly match against Bosnia and Herzegovina on 9 February 2011, where he scored his first international goal in the 2–0 victory.

=== 2011 Copa América ===
He would be left out of both the 2011 CONCACAF Gold Cup squad and the 2011 Copa América squad. He was later re-called to the team to fill the space left by eight players who were suspended from the squad due to a prostitution scandal in Quito, Ecuador. He would appear in all three group matches, where Mexico would finish fourth in their group, losing all three matches. It would be the team's worst finish in a Copa América tournament.

=== International goals ===
No.	Date	Venue	Opponent	Score	Result	Competition	Ref.
1.	9 February 2011	Georgia Dome, Atlanta, United States	Bosnia and Herzegovina	2–0	2–0	Friendly	

== Honours ==
Tigres UANL

- Mexican Primera División: Apertura 2011
- Copa MX: Clausura 2014
