= Filip Ivanović (footballer) =

Serbian footballer (born 1992)

Personal information
- Full name: Filip Ivanović
- Date of birth: 13 February 1992 (age 34)
- Place of birth: Aranđelovac, SFR Yugoslavia
- Height: 1.89 m (6 ft 2 in)
- Position: Centre-back

Team information
- Current team: Sogdiana
- Number: 13

Youth career
- Karađorđe Topola

Senior career*
Years	Team	Apps	(Gls)
2008–2014	Hajduk Beograd	25	(0)
2010–2014	→ Zvezdara		
2014	Lokomotiva Beograd		
2015	Bežanija	16	(0)
2016	Sloga Petrovac	11	(2)
2016–2017	Inđija	23	(3)
2017–2018	Radnik Surdulica	31	(4)
2018–2021	Sabah	55	(1)
2021–2022	Teuta Durrës	25	(3)
2022–2023	Radnički Kragujevac	31	(0)
2023–2025	Navbahor Namangan	32	(3)
2025	Al-Khaldiya	0	(0)
2025–	Sogdiana	23	(1)
- * Club domestic league appearances and goals as of 29 July 2026

Filip Ivanović (Serbian Cyrillic: Филип Ивановић; born 13 February 1992) is a Serbian professional footballer who plays as a defender for Uzbek club Sogdiana.

== Club career ==
Born in Aranđelovac, Ivanović started his career in Karađorđe Topola football academy. Later he played for Hajduk Beograd, where he made 25 appearances in a period between 2008 and 2014. In the meantime, he had several spells in the neighborhood, playing with the Belgrade Zone League side Zvezdara. After a half-season with Lokomotiva Beograd, Ivanović moved to Bežanija, where he spent the whole 2015. At the beginning of 2016, Ivanović joined Sloga Petrovac. He left after the club dissolved in the summer same year. Later he promoted as a new player of football club Inđija. Making 23 appearances with 3 goals, Ivanović was elected in the team of the 2016–17 Serbian First League season, by Sportski žurnal. In summer 2017, Ivanović signed a three-year deal with the Serbian top tier club Radnik Surdulica.

On 26 June 2018, it was announced about Ivanović signing with Azerbaijan Premier League side Sabah. Several days later, the transfer was confirmed by Radnik Surdulica sporting director Darko Gašić.

== Career statistics ==
As of match played 28 November 2023

Appearances and goals by club, season and competition
Club	Season	League			Cup		Continental		Other		Total	
Club	Season	Division	Apps	Goals	Apps	Goals	Apps	Goals	Apps	Goals	Apps	Goals
Hajduk Beograd	2008–09	Serbian First League	1	0	—		—		—		1	0
Hajduk Beograd	2009–10	Serbian League Belgrade	1	0	—		—		—		1	0
Hajduk Beograd	2011–12	Serbian League Belgrade	11	0	—		—		—		11	0
Hajduk Beograd	2013–14	Serbian League Belgrade	12	0	—		—		—		12	0
Hajduk Beograd	Total		25	0	—		—		—		25	0
Bežanija	2014–15	Serbian First League	4	0	—		—		—		4	0
Bežanija	2015–16	Serbian First League	12	0	2	0	—		—		14	0
Bežanija	Total		16	0	2	0	—		—		18	0
Sloga Petrovac	2015–16	Serbian First League	11	2	—		—		—		11	2
Inđija	2016–17	Serbian First League	23	3	1	0	—		—		24	3
Radnik Surdulica	2017–18	Serbian SuperLiga	31	4	0	0	—		—		31	4
Sabah	2018–19	Azerbaijan Premier League	24	1	1	0	—		—		25	1
Sabah	2019–20	Azerbaijan Premier League	14	0	2	0	—		—		16	0
Sabah	2020–21	Azerbaijan Premier League	17	0	1	1	—		—		18	1
Sabah	Total		55	1	4	1	—		—		59	2
Teuta Durrës	2021–22	Kategoria Superiore	25	3	5	1	—		1	0	31	4
Radnički Kragujevac	2022–23	Serbian SuperLiga	31	0	1	0	—		—		32	0
Navbahor Namangan	2023	Uzbekistan Super League	9	1	2	0	6	0	—		17	1
Career total			195	14	14	2	6	0	1	0	216	16
