= Vitaliy Kvashuk =

Ukrainian footballer

Personal information
- Full name: Vitaliy Olehovych Kvashuk
- Date of birth: 1 April 1993 (age 33)
- Place of birth: Kyiv, Ukraine
- Height: 1.81 m (5 ft 11 1/2 in)
- Position: Left winger

Team information
- Current team: Ypsonas
- Number: 22

Youth career
- 2006–2007: Vidradnyi Kyiv
- 2007–2010: Dynamo Kyiv

Senior career*
| Years | Team | Apps | (Gls) |
| 2010–2013 | Metalurh Donetsk | 1 | (0) |
| 2013–2015 | Zorya Luhansk | 0 | (0) |
| 2016 | Torpedo-BelAZ Zhodino | 12 | (1) |
| 2016 | Olimpik Donetsk | 0 | (0) |
| 2017 | Vitebsk | 28 | (5) |
| 2018 | Neman Grodno | 12 | (1) |
| 2018 | Sabah | 10 | (0) |
| 2019 | Gomel | 27 | (14) |
| 2020 | RFS | 0 | (0) |
| 2021–2022 | Aris Limassol | 21 | (2) |
| 2022– | Ypsonas | 32 | (4) |

International career
| 2008 | Ukraine U16 | 3 | (1) |
| 2010 | Ukraine U18 | 5 | (1) |
| 2010 | Ukraine U19 | 3 | (0) |
- * Club domestic league appearances and goals as of 31 May 2024

Vitaliy Kvashuk (Ukrainian: Віталій Олегович Квашук; born 1 April 1993) is a Ukrainian professional football player, who plays as a left winger for Ypsonas.

== Career ==
Kvashuk is a product of the youth team systems of Kyivan sportive schools. He made his debut for FC Metalurh entering as a second-half substitute against FC Dnipro Dnipropetrovsk on 1 December 2012 in the Ukrainian Premier League.

In June 2013 he signed a 3-year contract with another Ukrainian Premier League club – FC Zorya Luhansk.

In 2021 he played for Aris Limassol in Cypriot Second Division.
