= Imanol Iriberri =

Argentine footballer

Personal information
- Full name: Imanol Iriberri
- Date of birth: 4 March 1987 (age 39)
- Place of birth: Mar del Plata, Argentina
- Height: 1.80 m (5 ft 11 in)
- Position: Forward

Team information
- Current team: Hibernians
- Number: 32

Senior career*
| Years | Team | Apps | (Gls) |
| 2006–2009 | Aldosivi | 5 | (0) |
| 2009 | Alvarado | 0 | (0) |
| 2010–2012 | Independiente FBC | 47 | (13) |
| 2012–2013 | Sportivo Carapegua | 16 | (4) |
| 2013 | Deportes Tolima | 2 | (0) |
| 2013–2014 | Estudiantes de Mérida | 25 | (4) |
| 2014–2015 | Deportivo La Guaira | 30 | (7) |
| 2015–2016 | Wilstermann | 21 | (9) |
| 2016 | Boavista | 15 | (1) |
| 2016–2017 | Crucero del Norte | 13 | (2) |
| 2017 | Mineros | 12 | (5) |
| 2017–2018 | Sport Boys | 15 | (3) |
| 2018 | Deportivo La Guaira | 14 | (3) |
| 2019 | Sabail | 7 | (0) |
| 2019– | Hibernians | 25 | (9) |
| 2020–2021 | → Ħamrun Spartans (loan) | 5 | (0) |
- * Club domestic league appearances and goals as of 26 February 2020

Imanol Iriberri (born March 4, 1987, in Mar del Plata, Argentina) is an Argentine footballer who plays for Hibernians, in the Maltese Premier League.

== Honours ==
Deportivo La Guaira

- Copa Venezuela (1): 2014
