= Ihor Korotetskyi =

Ukrainian footballer

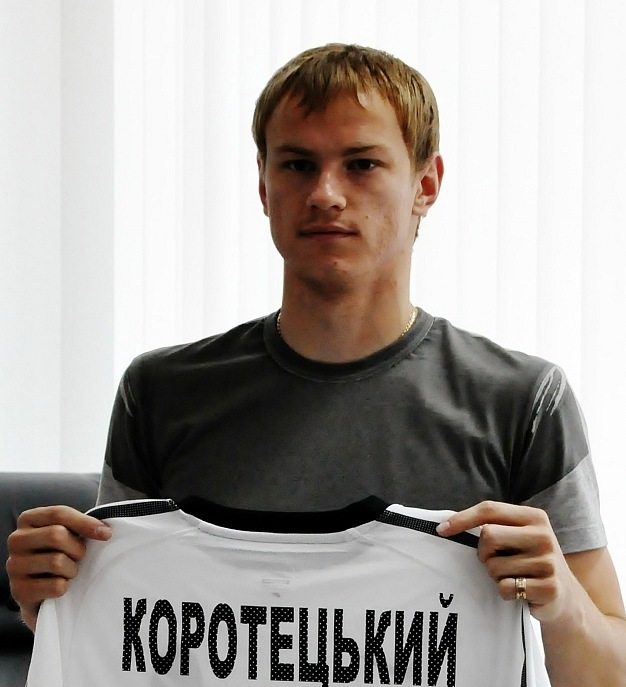

Personal information
- Full name: Ihor Oleksandrovych Korotetskyi
- Date of birth: 13 September 1987 (age 39)
- Place of birth: Kharkiv, Ukrainian SSR
- Height: 1.88 m (6 ft 2 in)
- Position: Defender

Youth career
- 2000–2001: Youth Sportive School #13 Kharkiv
- 2001–2004: Shakhtar Donetsk

Senior career*
Years	Team	Apps	(Gls)
2004–2011	Shakhtar Donetsk	1	(0)
2004–2006	→ Shakhtar-2 Donetsk	47	(1)
2006	→ Kryvbas Kryvyi Rih (loan)	13	(0)
2008	→ Zorya Luhansk (loan)	17	(0)
2009	→ Illichivets Mariupol (loan)	10	(0)
2009–2011	→ Metalurh Donetsk (loan)	18	(0)
2011–2013	Zorya Luhansk	21	(1)
2013–2014	Metalurh Zaporizhya	32	(0)
2015	Hoverla Uzhhorod	2	(0)
2015	Ahal	1	(1)
2016–2017	Helios Kharkiv	19	(1)
2017	Avanhard Kramatorsk	9	(1)
2018	Kapaz	12	(1)
2018–2020	Sabail	7	(0)

International career^{‡}
2003	Ukraine-16	1	(0)
2003–2004	Ukraine-17	13	(0)
2004–2005	Ukraine-18	8	(0)
2005	Ukraine-19	5	(0)
2006–2008	Ukraine-21	8	(0)
- * Club domestic league appearances and goals as of 15 January 2020 ‡ National team caps and goals as of 7 December 2017

Ihor Korotetskiy (Ukrainian: І́гор Олександрович Короте́цький; born 13 September 1987) is a professional Ukrainian football defender who last played for Sabail FK in Azerbaijan Premier League.

== Career ==
=== Club ===
On 14 January 2020, Korotetskiy left Sabail FK by mutual consent.
