= Tural Akhundov =

Azerbaijani football player (born 1988)

Personal information
- Full name: Tural Mohsum oglu Akhundov
- Date of birth: 1 August 1988 (age 38)
- Place of birth: Baku, Azerbaijan
- Height: 1.72 m (5 ft 8 in)
- Position: Right back

Senior career*
Years	Team	Apps	(Gls)
2009–2011	Mughan	39	(3)
2011–2013	Ravan Baku	55	(0)
2013–2015	Simurq	63	(0)
2015–2017	Kapaz	60	(10)
2017–2018	Sumgayit	27	(4)
2018–2020	Neftçi	37	(1)
2020–2022	Shamakhi	27	(1)
2022–2023	Kapaz	16	(0)

International career^{‡}
2009–2010	Azerbaijan U21	3	(0)
2018–	Azerbaijan	2	(0)
- * Club domestic league appearances and goals as of 27 May 2023 ‡ National team caps and goals as of 27 March 2018

Tural Akhundov (Azerbaijani: Tural Möhsüm oğlu Axundov; born on 1 August 1988) is an Azerbaijani football player.

== Career ==
=== Club ===
On 11 June 2018, Akhundov signed one-year contract with Neftçi. Akhundov left Neftçi on 19 June 2020 after his contract expired.

On 22 June 2020, Akhundov signed a one-year contract with Keşla FK.

=== International ===
On 23 March 2018, Akhundov made his senior international debut for Azerbaijan game against Belarus.

== Career statistics ==
=== International ===
Azerbaijan
Year	Apps	Goals
2018	1	0
Total	1	0

Statistics accurate as of match played 23 March 2018
