= Ali Babayev =

Israeli-born Azerbaijani footballer

Eli Babayev אלי בבייב
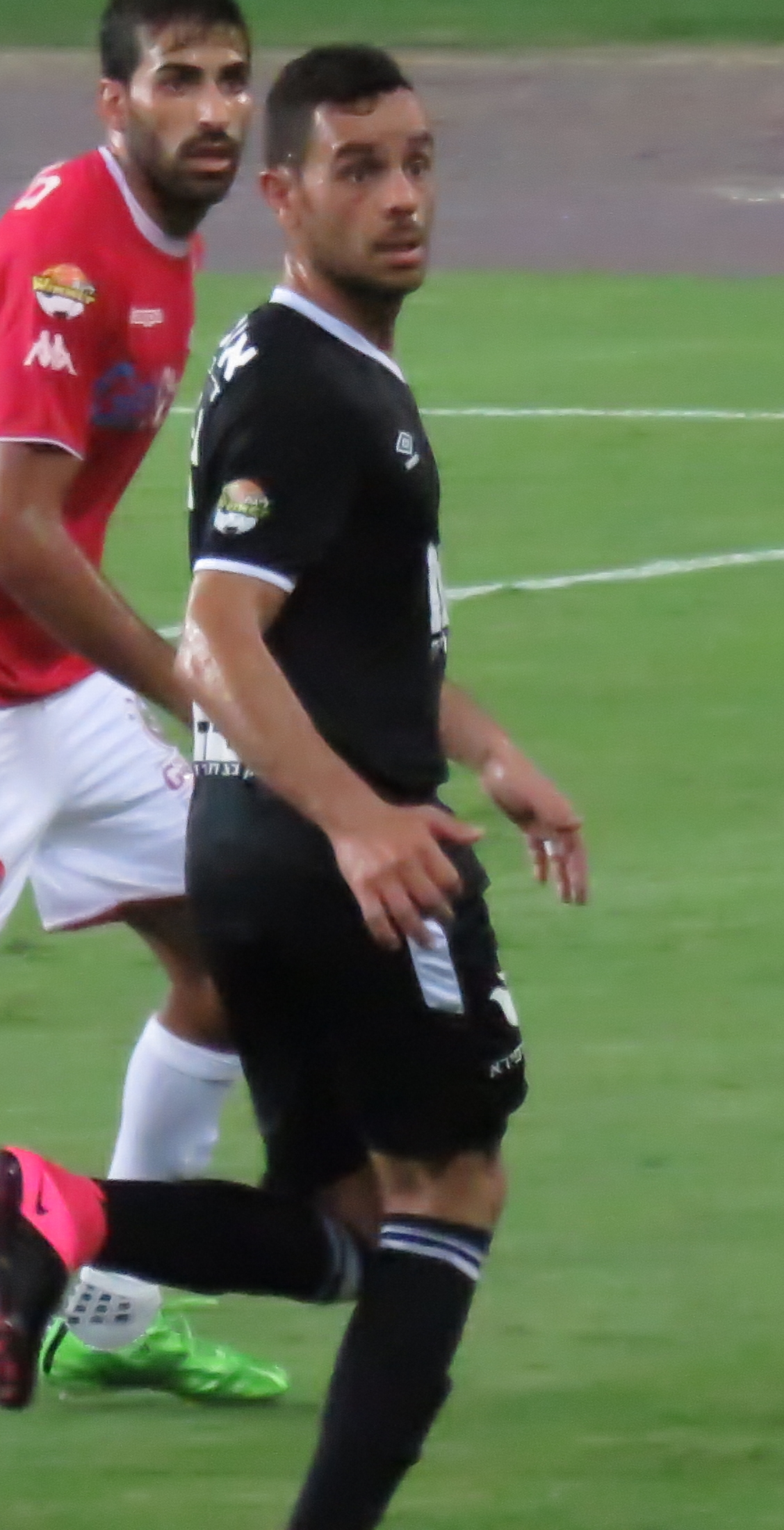
- Babayev in 2015

Personal information
- Full name: Eli Babayev
- Date of birth: 1 November 1990 (age 36)
- Place of birth: Ra'anana, Israel
- Height: 1.67 m (5 ft 5 1/2 in)
- Position: Midfielder

Senior career*
Years	Team	Apps	(Gls)
2007–2018	Hapoel Ra'anana	135	(5)
2010–2012	→ Hapoel Marmorek (loan)	45	(3)
2018–2019	Sumgayit	25	(0)
2019–2021	Maccabi Petah Tikva	28	(1)
2021	Hapoel Ramat Gan	11	(0)

International career
2019	Azerbaijan	1	(0)
- * Club domestic league appearances and goals

Eli Babayev (Azerbaijani: Əli Babayev, Hebrew: אלי בבייב; born 1 November 1990) is a former professional footballer who played as a midfielder. Born in Israel, he played for the Azerbaijan national team.

== Career ==
=== Club ===
Babayev made his professional debut for Hapoel Ra'anana in the Israeli Premier League on 26 October 2013, coming on as a substitute in the 84th minute for Assi Baldout in the 0–0 draw against Bnei Yehuda Tel Aviv.

=== International ===
Babayev was called up to the Azerbaijan national team for the first time in March 2019 for the UEFA Euro 2020 qualifying match against Croatia and a friendly against Lithuania.

== Career statistics ==
=== International ===
Azerbaijan national team
Year	Apps	Goals
2019	1	0
Total	1	0

Statistics accurate as of match played 25 March 2019
