= Dani Quintana =

Spanish footballer

Personal information
- Full name: Daniel Quintana Sosa
- Date of birth: 8 March 1987 (age 39)
- Place of birth: Las Palmas, Spain
- Height: 1.70 m (5 ft 7 in)
- Position: Winger

Youth career
- Huracán
- 2004–2006: Valencia

Senior career*
Years	Team	Apps	(Gls)
2006–2008	Valencia B	6	(1)
2006–2007	→ Puçol (loan)		
2008	Ontinyent	9	(0)
2008–2009	Alzira	33	(2)
2009–2010	Racing Ferrol	19	(1)
2010–2011	Huracán	19	(4)
2011–2012	Olímpic Xàtiva	36	(2)
2012–2013	Gimnàstic	20	(2)
2013–2015	Jagiellonia Białystok	56	(20)
2015	Al Ahli	7	(1)
2015–2020	Qarabağ	98	(33)
2020	Chengdu Better City	14	(4)
2021	Jagiellonia Białystok	3	(0)
2022–2023	Tamaraceite	16	(1)
- * Club domestic league appearances and goals

Daniel 'Dani' Quintana Sosa (born 8 March 1987) is a Spanish former professional footballer who played as a winger.

== Career ==
Born in Las Palmas, Canary Islands, Quintana only played lower league football in his country, representing Ontinyent CF, UD Alzira, Racing de Ferrol, CD Olímpic de Xàtiva and Gimnàstic de Tarragona in the Segunda División B. He appeared for UD Puçol, Valencia CF Mestalla and Huracán Valencia CF in Tercera División.

In the late hours of the January 2013 transfer window, Quintana signed with Poland's Jagiellonia Białystok after a successful trial and after terminating his contract with Nàstic, in what was his first professional experience. He made his debut in the Ekstraklasa on 23 February against Podbeskidzie Bielsko-Biała, and scored his first goal on 3 March in a 2–1 away win over Górnik Zabrze.

On 29 September 2014, Quintana joined Al Ahli Saudi FC. He netted his first and only goal for the Saudi club on 18 October, helping to a 2–1 home defeat of Al Nassr FC.

Quintana changed teams and countries again in March 2015, moving to the Azerbaijan Premier League after signing a three-year contract with Qarabağ FK. On 17 June 2018, the 31-year-old renewed his link until 2020.

On 3 February 2020, Quintana signed with China League One side Chengdu Better City FC.

== Career statistics ==
Appearances and goals by club, season and competition
Club	Season	League			Cup		Europe		Total	
Club	Season	Division	Apps	Goals	Apps	Goals	Apps	Goals	Apps	Goals
Ontinyent	2007–08	Segunda División B	9	0	0	0	—		9	0
Alzira	2008–09	Segunda División B	33	2	1	0	—		34	2
Racing Ferrol	2009–10	Segunda División B	19	1	0	0	—		19	1
Olímpic Xàtiva	2011–12	Segunda División B	36	2	1	0	—		37	2
Gimnàstic	2012–13	Segunda División B	20	2	1	0	—		21	2
Jagiellonia Białystok	2012–13	Ekstraklasa	15	4	2	2	—		17	6
Jagiellonia Białystok	2013–14	Ekstraklasa	35	15	6	1	—		41	16
Jagiellonia Białystok	2014–15	Ekstraklasa	6	1	0	0	—		6	1
Jagiellonia Białystok	Total		56	20	8	3	—		64	23
Al Ahli	2014–15	Saudi Professional League	7	1	0	0	—		7	1
Qarabağ	2015–16	Azerbaijan Premier League	32	15	5	1	12	1	49	17
Qarabağ	2016–17	Azerbaijan Premier League	15	3	2	1	12	2	29	6
Qarabağ	2017–18	Azerbaijan Premier League	22	5	2	0	4	0	28	5
Qarabağ	2018–19	Azerbaijan Premier League	18	7	2	1	4	2	24	10
Qarabağ	2019–20	Azerbaijan Premier League	11	3	1	0	12	3	24	6
Qarabağ	Total		98	33	12	3	44	8	154	44
Chengdu Better City	2020	China League One	14	4	0	0	—		14	4
Jagiellonia	2021–22	Ekstraklasa	3	0	0	0	—		3	0
Tamaraceite	2022–23	Tercera Federación	16	1	—		—		16	1
Career total			311	66	23	6	44	8	378	80

== Honours ==
Qarabağ

- Azerbaijan Premier League: 2015–16, 2016–17, 2017–18, 2018–19
- Azerbaijan Cup: 2015–16, 2016–17

Individual

- Azerbaijan Premier League top scorer: 2015–16
