= Maudo Jarjué =

Gambian footballer (born 1997)

Personal information
- Full name: Maudo Lamine Jarjué
- Birth name: Modou Lamin Jarju
- Date of birth: 30 September 1997 (age 29)
- Place of birth: Serekunda, The Gambia
- Height: 1.89 m (6 ft 2 in)
- Position: Centre-back

Team information
- Current team: Struga
- Number: 99

Youth career
- 2010: Boca Juniors Academy Bakoteh
- 2011: Jintos FC
- 2015–2016: Gil Vicente

Senior career*
Years	Team	Apps	(Gls)
2012	Dippa Kunda		
2013	GPA	2	(0)
2014	Wallidan	1	(0)
2015	Nuno Tristão	4	(0)
2016–2017	Gil Vicente	4	(0)
2017–2019	Səbail	45	(0)
2019–2021	Austria Wien	10	(0)
2021	→ Elfsborg (loan)	19	(1)
2022–2024	Elfsborg	11	(1)
2023	→ Slovan Bratislava (loan)	2	(0)
2024	Sandefjord	0	(0)
2025–	Struga	31	(2)

International career^{‡}
2021–	Gambia	2	(0)
- * Club domestic league appearances and goals as of 18 June 2026 ‡ National team caps and goals as of 16:51, 2 January 2024 (UTC)

Maudo Lamine Jarjué (born Modou Lamin Jarju on 30 September 1997) is a Gambian professional footballer who plays as a centre-back for Struga and the Gambia national team. Nicknamed Chucka or Chuka, he also holds Bissau-Guinean citizenship through his grandmother.

== Career ==
On 6 August 2016, Jarjué made his professional debut with Gil Vicente in a 2016–17 LigaPro match against Varzim.

On 9 July 2017, Jarjué signed a two-year contract with Azerbaijan Premier League side Səbail FK.

On 18 June 2019, Jarjué signed a contract with Austrian Football Bundesliga side Austria Wien.

On 2 November 2021, IF Elfsborg exercised the purchase option in their loan contract and signed a 3-year contract with Jarjué.

In March 2024, Norwegian club Sandefjord signed Jarjué on a one-year contract, keeping him at the club until the end of the 2024 season.

== International career ==
On 2 October 2020, Jarjué was called up by the Gambia.

== Career statistics ==
=== Club ===
As of 11 April 2024

Appearances and goals by club, season and competition
Club	Season	League			National Cup (Note: Includes Azerbaijan Cup, Austrian Cup, Svenska Cupen, Slovak Cup)		Continental		Total	
Club	Season	Division	Apps	Goals	Apps	Goals	Apps	Goals	Apps	Goals
Gil Vicente	2016–17	LigaPro	4	0	0	0	—		4	0
Sabail	2017–18	Azerbaijan Premier League	20	0	2	0	—		22	0
Sabail	2018–19	Azerbaijan Premier League	25	0	3	0	—		28	0
Sabail	Total		45	0	5	0	—		50	0
Austria Wien	2019-20	Austrian Bundesliga	6	0	0	0	2 (Note: Appearances in UEFA Europa League)	1	8	1
Austria Wien	2020-21	Austrian Bundesliga	4	0	2	0	—		6	0
Austria Wien	Total		10	0	2	0	2	1	14	1
Elfsborg (loan)	2021	Allsvenskan	19	1	0	0	4 (Note: Appearances in UEFA Europa Conference League)	0	23	1
Elfsborg	2022	Allsvenskan	10	1	0	0	1	0	11	1
Elfsborg	2023	Allsvenskan	1	0	1	0	—		2	0
Elfsborg	Total		30	2	1	0	5	0	36	2
Slovan Bratislava (loan)	2022-23	Slovak First League	2	0	2	0	2	0	6	0
Sandefjord	2024	Eliteserien	0	0	0	0	—		0	0
Career total			91	2	10	0	9	1	110	3
