= Kyrylo Petrov =

Ukrainian footballer

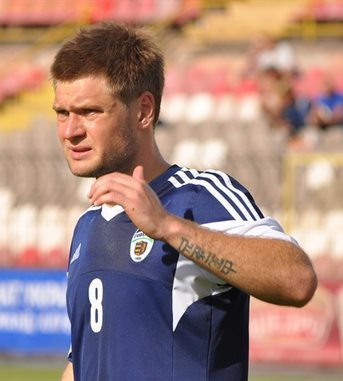

Personal information
- Full name: Kyrylo Valentynovych Petrov
- Date of birth: 22 June 1990 (age 36)
- Place of birth: Kyiv, Ukrainian SSR
- Height: 1.86 m (6 ft 1 in)
- Position: Centre-back

Youth career
- 2003–2007: Dynamo Kyiv

Senior career*
Years	Team	Apps	(Gls)
2007–2009	Dynamo-2 Kyiv	50	(3)
2007–2013	Dynamo Kyiv	1	(0)
2010–2012	→ Kryvbas Kryvyi Rih (loan)	56	(0)
2013	→ Hoverla Uzhhorod (loan)	12	(1)
2013	Arsenal Kyiv	6	(0)
2014	Korona Kielce	20	(1)
2015	Ordabasy	27	(0)
2016	Olimpik Donetsk	22	(2)
2017–2019	Neftchi Baku	64	(1)
2020–2022	Kolos Kovalivka	44	(3)
2022	→ Korona Kielce (loan)	9	(1)
2022–2024	Korona Kielce	28	(2)

International career
2005–2006	Ukraine U16	11	(5)
2005–2007	Ukraine U17	20	(2)
2007–2009	Ukraine U18	9	(0)
2007–2009	Ukraine U19	20	(3)
2010	Ukraine U20	2	(0)
2009–2011	Ukraine U21	7	(1)
Medal record
Men's football
Representing Ukraine
UEFA Euro U-19
Winner	2009 Ukraine
- * Club domestic league appearances and goals as of 6 January 2024

Kyrylo Petrov (Ukrainian: Кирилo Валентинович Петров, born 22 June 1990) is a Ukrainian professional footballer who last played as a centre-back for Korona Kielce.

== Honours ==
Korona Kielce II

- IV liga Świętokrzyskie: 2021–22

Ukraine U19

- UEFA European Under-19 Championship: 2009

Individual

- UEFA European Under-19 Championship Golden Player Award: 2009
