= Oleksandr Rybka =

Ukrainian footballer (born 1987)

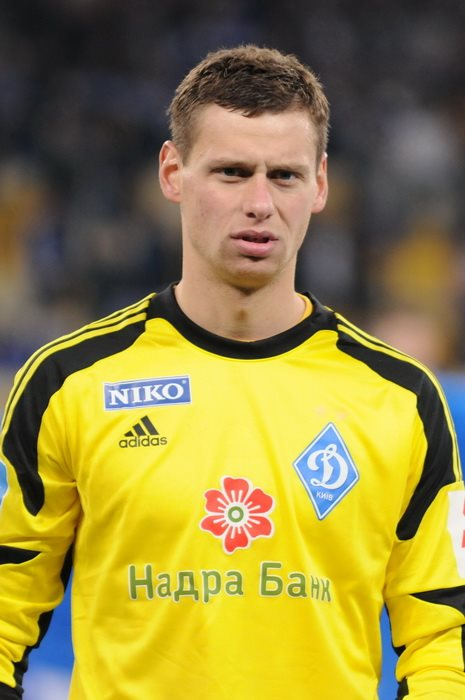

Personal information
- Full name: Oleksandr Yevhenovych Rybka
- Date of birth: 10 April 1987 (age 39)
- Place of birth: Kyiv, Ukraine
- Height: 1.93 m (6 ft 4 in)
- Position: Goalkeeper

Youth career
- 2000–2002: Dynamo Kyiv
- 2002: Zmina-Obolon Kyiv
- 2002–2003: Kyiv-Skhid Kyiv
- 2004: Vidradnyi Kyiv

Senior career*
Years	Team	Apps	(Gls)
2005–2010	Dynamo Kyiv	14	(0)
2005	→ Dynamo-3 Kyiv	6	(0)
2005–2008	→ Dynamo-2 Kyiv	30	(0)
2010–2011	Obolon Kyiv	29	(0)
2011–2012	Shakhtar Donetsk	19	(0)
2014–2016	Dynamo Kyiv	23	(0)
2017–2018	Kardemir Karabükspor	22	(0)
2018	Afjet Afyonspor	15	(0)
2019–2020	Sabail	20	(0)
2020–2021	Liepāja	14	(0)
2021–2023	Metalist Kharkiv	23	(0)
2022	→ Boluspor (loan)	2	(0)
2023	Lviv	11	(0)
2023–2025	Obolon Kyiv	10	(0)
Total		238	(0)

International career^{‡}
2002	Ukraine U15	2	(0)
2002–2003	Ukraine U16	11	(0)
2003–2004	Ukraine U17	11	(0)
2003–2005	Ukraine U18	11	(0)
2005	Ukraine U19	5	(0)
2006–2009	Ukraine U21	11	(0)
2011–2015	Ukraine	3	(0)

Managerial career
- 2025: Chornomorets Odesa (goalkeepers coach)
- 2026–: Podillya Khmelnytskyi (goalkeepers coach)
Medal record
Men's football
Representing Ukraine
UEFA European Under-21 Championship
Runner-up	2006 Portugal
- * Club domestic league appearances and goals as of 29 August 2026 ‡ National team caps and goals as of 21 May 2021

Oleksandr Yevhenovych Rybka (Ukrainian: Олександр Євгенович Рибка; born 10 April 1987) is a Ukrainian football coach and former player who played as a goalkeeper.

== Career ==
He was a goalkeeper for the Ukrainian national under-21 football team along with Bohdan Shust becoming the vice-champion at the 2006 UEFA European Under-21 Football Championship.

In the 2007–2008 season, due to injury, he made four appearances for FC Dynamo Kyiv conceding 3 goals. He then made his UEFA Champions League debut against Real Madrid C.F. in 2006/2007 season's group stage. Dynamo lost the game 1–5 in Madrid and Rybka made a memorable performance, even though he conceded a 5th and final goal of the match from a penalty kick.

In 2011, Rybka had signed for FC Shakhtar. In Shakhtar, he would put up some great performances, and would eventually become the starting goalkeeper. However, this momentum stopped. Rybka received a two-year ban after testing positive for a prohibited substance diuretic in a league game against Karpaty Lviv in November 2011 lasting until January 10, 2014, meaning he would miss the 2012 UEFA European Championship which were being co-hosted by Ukraine alongside Poland.

On 1 November 2013, Rybka re-signed for Dynamo Kyiv. The 3-year contract he signed began in January 2014, when his ban was terminated.

In March 2022, he moved on loan to Boluspor.

In January 2023 Rybka moved to FC Lviv. On 1 July 2023, he joined Ukrainian Premier League side FC Obolon Kyiv.

On 20 July 2026, it was announced that Rybka signed for Podillya Khmelnytskyi.

== Coaching career ==
On 17 June 2025, was announced that FC Chornomorets Odesa hired Rybka as goalkeepers coach.

== Honours ==
Dynamo Kyiv

- Ukrainian Premier League: 2006–07, 2008–09, 2014–15, 2015–16
- Ukrainian Cup: 2005-06, 2006-07, 2013-14, 2014–15

Liepāja

- Latvian Football Cup: 2020

Shakhtar Donetsk

- Ukrainian Premier League: 2011-12
- Ukrainian Cup: 2011-12
