= Kévin Koubemba =

Congolese footballer (born 1993)

Personal information
- Date of birth: 23 March 1993 (age 33)
- Place of birth: Coulommiers, France
- Height: 1.92 m (6 ft 3 1/2 in)
- Position: Striker

Team information
- Current team: Feignies Aulnoye

Youth career
- –2011: Amiens

Senior career*
Years	Team	Apps	(Gls)
2011–2014	Amiens B	16	(4)
2012–2014	Amiens	38	(2)
2014–2015	Lille B	12	(8)
2015–2016	Lille	8	(0)
2015–2016	→ Brest B (loan)	1	(0)
2015–2016	→ Brest (loan)	18	(3)
2016–2017	Sint-Truiden	8	(1)
2017	CSKA Sofia	24	(1)
2018	Bourg-Péronnas	10	(2)
2018–2019	Sabail	28	(5)
2019–2021	Sabah	22	(5)
2021–2022	Teuta	13	(2)
2022	Kuala Lumpur City	8	(1)
2022–2023	Chornomorets Odesa	7	(0)
2023	Argeș Pitești	14	(2)
2024	Tadamon Sour	14	(4)
2024–	Feignies Aulnoye	9	(2)

International career^{‡}
2014–2018	Congo	8	(0)
- * Club domestic league appearances and goals as of 7 December 2024 ‡ National team caps and goals as of 6 December 2021

Kévin Koubemba (born 23 March 1993) is a professional footballer who plays as a striker for Championnat National 1 club Feignies Aulnoye. Born in France, he played for the Republic of Congo national team.

== Club career ==
Born in Coulommiers, Koubemba has played for Amiens, Lille, Brest, and Sint-Truiden.

On 31 January 2017, Koubemba signed contract with Bulgarian club CSKA Sofia. He left the club in January 2018.

On 23 July 2018, Koubemba signed a contract with Azerbaijan Premier League side Sabail FK.

On 7 June 2019, Koubemba signed a two-year contract with Azerbaijan Premier League side Sabah FK.

After playing in Albania with Teuta, in 2022 he signed for Malaysian club Kuala Lumpur City. He then played for Chornomorets Odesa.

== International career ==
He made his international debut for Congo in 2014. He was initially part of Congo's 38-man provisional squad for the 2015 Africa Cup of Nations, but was dropped from the list after a week.

=== International stats ===
As of 25 March 2018

Appearances and goals by national team and year
National team	Year	Apps	Goals
Congo	2014	1	0
Congo	2015	3	0
Congo	2016	2	0
Congo	2017	1	0
Congo	2018	1	0
Total		8	0
