= Tome Kitanovski =

Macedonian footballer (born 1992)

Personal information
- Full name: Tome Kitanovski
- Date of birth: 21 May 1992 (age 34)
- Place of birth: Bitola, Macedonia
- Height: 1.83 m (6 ft 0 in)
- Position: Defender

Youth career
- –2010: Pelister

Senior career*
| Years | Team | Apps | (Gls) |
| 2010–2013 | Pelister | 67 | (1) |
| 2014 | Universitatea Craiova | 9 | (1) |
| 2014–2015 | Voždovac | 21 | (0) |
| 2015–2017 | Mladost Lučani | 34 | (4) |
| 2017 | Istra 1961 | 22 | (3) |
| 2018 | Slaven Belupo | 15 | (1) |
| 2018–2019 | Sabail | 21 | (0) |
| 2019 | Kukësi | 13 | (0) |
| 2020–2021 | Makedonija | 35 | (0) |
| 2021–2022 | Shkupi | 2 | (0) |
| 2022 | Struga | 4 | (1) |
| 2022–2023 | Pelister | | |
| 2023–2024 | Sloboda Užice | 16 | (0) |
| 2024 | Mauerwerk | 14 | (1) |
| 2024–2025 | Voska Sport | 24 | (0) |
| 2025 | FavAC | 9 | (1) |
| 2026 | AFC Câmpulung Muscel | 10 | (0) |

International career
| 2011 | Macedonia U19 | 4 | (0) |
| 2012–2013 | Macedonia U21 | 5 | (0) |
| 2012–2020 | Macedonia | 2 | (0) |
- * Club domestic league appearances and goals as of 9 May 2026

Tome Kitanovski (Macedonian: Томе Китановски, born 21 May 1992) is a Macedonian professional footballer who plays as a defender.

== Club career ==
Born in Bitola, Kitanovski played with FK Pelister in the Macedonian First Football League and with Romanian Liga II club CS Universitatea Craiova.

== International career ==
He made his senior debut for Macedonia in a December 2012 friendly match against Poland, his only international game.

=== Career statistics ===
Appearances and goals by national team and year
| National team | Year | Apps | Goals |
|---|---|---|---|
Macedonia
| Macedonia | 2012 | 1 | 0 |
| Macedonia | 2020 | 1 | 0 |
| Total | | 2 | 0 |

== Honours ==
Pelister

- 2. MFL: 2011–12

Universitatea Craiova

- Liga II: 2013–14

Kukësi

- Albanian Supercup runner-up: 2019
