= Peyman Babaei =

Iranian footballer

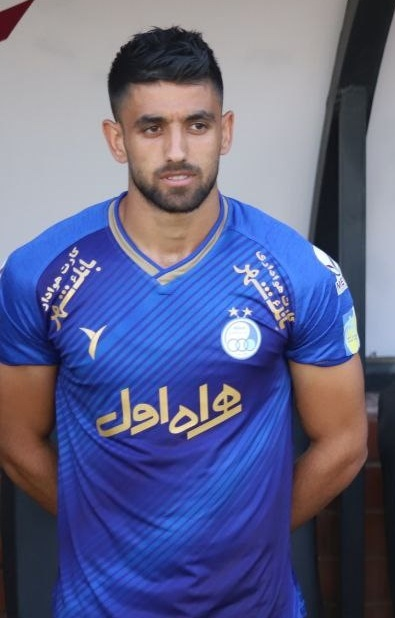
- Babaei in 2022

Personal information
- Full name: Peyman Babaei Alibeyk
- Date of birth: 14 December 1994 (age 31)
- Place of birth: Tabriz, Iran
- Height: 1.83 m (6 ft 0 in)
- Position: Forward

Youth career
- 2011–2014: Tractor

Senior career*
Years	Team	Apps	(Gls)
2014–2015	Tractor	2	(0)
2015–2018	Gostaresh Foulad	28	(7)
2018–2021	Machine Sazi	26	(16)
2019–2020	→ Sumgayit (loan)	30	(18)
2021–2022	Tractor	31	(7)
2022–2024	Esteghlal	44	(3)
2024–2026	Gol Gohar	12	(1)
2025	→ Chadormalou (loan)	10	(0)
2026	Fajr Sepasi	7	(0)
- * Club domestic league appearances and goals as of 1 May 2025

Peyman Babaei Alibeyk (Persian: پیمان بابایی علی بیک; born 14 December 1994) is an Iranian professional footballer who plays as a forward for Fajr Sepasi in the Persian Gulf Pro League.

== Career ==
Babaei was banned two years for doping between December 2014 and December 2016.

On 16 January 2019, Babaei signed for Sumgayit FK on loan from Machine Sazi on a 18–month loan deal.

== Career statistics ==
As of 28 May 2024

Appearances and goals by club, season and competition
Club	Season	League			Cup		ACL		Other		Total	
Club	Season	League	Apps	Goals	Apps	Goals	Apps	Goals	Apps	Goals	Apps	Goals
Tractor	2013–14	Persian Gulf Pro League	0	0	0	0	1	0	0	0	1	0
Gostaresh Foulad	2016–17	Persian Gulf Pro League	5	0	1	0	0	0	0	0	6	0
Gostaresh Foulad	2017–18	Persian Gulf Pro League	22	5	3	0	0	0	0	0	25	5
Gostaresh Foulad	Total		27	5	4	0	0	0	0	0	31	5
Sumgayit	2018–19	Azerbaijan Premier League	11	3	3	3	0	0	0	0	14	6
Machine Sazi	2018–19	Persian Gulf Pro League	11	3	0	0	0	0	0	0	11	3
Sumgayit	2019–20	Azerbaijan Premier League	19	7	2	0	0	0	0	0	21	7
Machine Sazi	2020–21	Persian Gulf Pro League	13	6	0	0	0	0	0	0	13	6
Tractor	2020–21	Persian Gulf Pro League	11	2	1	0	6	0	0	0	18	2
Tractor	2021–22	Persian Gulf Pro League	25	5	1	0	0	0	0	0	26	5
Tractor	Total		36	7	2	0	6	0	0	0	44	7
Esteghlal	2022–23	Persian Gulf Pro League	25	2	4	0	0	0	1	0	30	2
Esteghlal	2023–24	Persian Gulf Pro League	19	1	0	0	0	0	0	0	19	1
Esteghlal	Total		44	3	4	0	0	0	1	0	49	3
Career total			161	34	15	3	7	0	1	0	184	37

== Honours ==
Sumgayit

- Azerbaijan Premier League Top Goalscorer (1): 2019–20

Esteghlal

- Iranian Super Cup: 2022
