= 2019–20 Sumgayit FK season =

Sumgayit
2019-20 season
- President: Kamran Guliyev
- Manager: Aykhan Abbasov
- Stadium: Kapital Bank Arena
- Premier League: 5th
- Azerbaijan Cup: Semifinal
- Top goalscorer: League: Peyman Babaei (7); All: Peyman Babaei (7)

The Sumgayit FK 2019–20 season was Sumgayit's ninth Azerbaijan Premier League season, and tenth season in their history.

== Season events ==
On 13 March 2020, the Azerbaijan Premier League was postponed due to the COVID-19 pandemic.

On 19 June 2020, the AFFA announced that the 2019–20 season had been officially ended without the resumption of the remains matches due to the escalating situation of the COVID-19 pandemic in Azerbaijan.

== Squad ==
As of match played 7 March 2020

No.	Name	Nationality	Position	Date of birth (age)	Signed from	Signed in	Contract ends	Apps.	Goals
Goalkeepers
1	Mehdi Jannatov	(Russia)	GK	26 January 1992 (age 34)	Anzhi Makhachkala	2017		56	0
12	Nijat Mehbaliyev	(Azerbaijan)	GK	11 September 2000 (age 26)	loan from Qarabağ	2019	2020	0	0
13	Aydin Bayramov	(Azerbaijan)	GK	18 February 1996 (age 30)	Neftchi Baku	2019	2020	2	0
36	Suleyman Suleymanov	(Azerbaijan)	GK	29 May 1998 (age 28)	Gabala	2017		0	0
Defenders
2	Rail Malikov	(Azerbaijan)	DF	18 December 1985 (age 40)	AZAL	2016		84	0
3	Vurğun Hüseynov	(Azerbaijan)	DF	25 April 1988 (age 38)	Gabala	2013		183	1
4	Shahriyar Aliyev	(Azerbaijan)	DF	25 December 1992 (age 33)	Kapaz	2018		41	4
5	Dzhamaldin Khodzhaniyazov	(Russia)	DF	18 July 1996 (age 30)	BATE Borisov	2019		18	0
14	Elvin Badalov	(Azerbaijan)	DF	14 June 1995 (age 31)	Sabah	2019		25	0
22	Sertan Tashkin	(Azerbaijan)	DF	8 October 1997 (age 29)	Keşla	2019	2021	20	1
Midfielders
6	Vugar Mustafayev	(Azerbaijan)	MF	5 August 1994 (age 32)	Zira	2019	2020	18	0
10	Amir Agayev	(Israel)	MF	10 February 1992 (age 34)	Hapoel Tel Aviv	2019	2020	32	7
11	Elgun Nabiyev	(Azerbaijan)	MF	4 January 1996 (age 30)	loan from Sabah	2019	2020	4	0
17	Murad Khachayev	(Azerbaijan)	MF	14 April 1998 (age 28)	Shakhtar Donetsk	2018		12	1
18	Suleyman Ahmadov	(Azerbaijan)	MF	25 November 1999 (age 26)	Qarabağ	2018		37	1
20	Rüfət Abdullazadə	(Azerbaijan)	MF	17 January 2001 (age 25)		2017		6	0
22	Bakhshali Bakhshaliyev	(Azerbaijan)	MF	9 March 1998 (age 28)		2019		0	0
28	Sabuhi Abdullazade	(Azerbaijan)	MF	18 December 2001 (age 24)		2019		13	0
30	Nabi Mammadov	(Azerbaijan)	MF	20 August 1999 (age 27)		2020		1	0
44	Elvin Jafarguliyev	(Azerbaijan)	MF	26 October 2000 (age 26)	loan from Qarabağ	2019		20	2
46	Aleksey Isayev	(Russia)	MF	9 November 1995 (age 30)	Zenit St.Petersburg	2018		43	0
50	Ilgar Gurbanov	(Azerbaijan)	MF	25 April 1986 (age 40)	Gabala	2019	2020	5	0
90	Rahim Sadykhov	(Azerbaijan)	MF	18 July 1996 (age 30)	Torpedo Moscow	2019		18	5
97	Khayal Najafov	(Azerbaijan)	MF	19 December 1997 (age 28)	Academy	2016		92	1
Forwards
8	Peyman Babaei	(Iran)	ST	14 February 1994 (age 32)	loan from Machine Sazi	2019	2020	35	13
9	Amil Yunanov	(Azerbaijan)	ST	6 January 1993 (age 33)	Keşla	2019	2020	101	34
42	Elnur Jafarov	(Azerbaijan)	ST	28 March 1997 (age 29)		2019		0	0
70	Mehdi Sharifi	(Iran)	ST	16 August 1992 (age 34)	Persepolis	2019	2021	19	5
Left during the season
7	Ehtiram Shahverdiyev	(Azerbaijan)	MF	1 October 1996 (age 30)	Gabala	2017		49	1
49	Ibrahim Aliyev	(Azerbaijan)	ST	17 July 1999 (age 27)	Qarabağ	2019		2	0

== Transfers ==
=== In ===
Date	Position	Nationality	Name	From	Fee	Ref.
Summer 2019	FW	(Azerbaijan)	Elnur Jafarov		Free	
Summer 2018	MF	(Azerbaijan)	Murad Khachayev	Shakhtar Donetsk	Undisclosed	
4 June 2019	MF	(Azerbaijan)	Vugar Mustafayev	Zira	Undisclosed	
4 June 2019	FW	(Azerbaijan)	Amil Yunanov	Keşla	Undisclosed	
13 June 2019	DF	(Azerbaijan)	Sertan Taşqın	Keşla	Undisclosed	
11 August 2019	FW	(Iran)	Mehdi Sharifi	Persepolis	Undisclosed	
20 August 2019	MF	(Azerbaijan)	Ilgar Gurbanov	Gabala	Free	
12 September 2019	DF	(Russia)	Dzhamaldin Khodzhaniyazov	BATE Borisov	Undisclosed	
12 September 2019	MF	(Azerbaijan)	Rahim Sadykhov	Torpedo Moscow	Undisclosed	

=== Loans in ===
Date from	Position	Nationality	Name	From	Date to	Ref.
Summer 2019	MF	(Azerbaijan)	Elvin Jafarguliyev	Qarabağ	End of Season	
14 June 2019	MF	(Azerbaijan)	Elgun Nabiyev	Sabah	End of Season	
13 September 2019	GK	(Azerbaijan)	Nijat Mehbaliyev	Qarabağ	End of Season	

=== Out ===
Date	Position	Nationality	Name	To	Fee	Ref.
Summer 2019	MF	(Azerbaijan)	Nijat Gurbanov	Samtredia	Undisclosed	
31 May 2019	MF	(Azerbaijan)	Elvin Mammadov	Zira	Undisclosed	
31 May 2019	MF	(Azerbaijan)	Javid Taghiyev	Sabah	Undisclosed	
4 June 2019	GK	(Azerbaijan)	Rashad Azizli	Keşla	Undisclosed	
9 August 2019	DF	(Azerbaijan)	Adil Naghiyev	Sabail	Undisclosed	
2 January 2019	FW	(Azerbaijan)	Ibrahim Aliyev	Neftçi	Undisclosed	

=== Released ===
Date	Position	Nationality	Name	Joined	Date
Summer 2019	DF	(Azerbaijan)	Arif Dashdemirov		
Summer 2019	DF	(Azerbaijan)	Gvanzav Mahammadov		
Summer 2019	MF	(Azerbaijan)	Ali Babayev	Maccabi Petah Tikva	
Summer 2019	MF	(Azerbaijan)	Afran Ismayilov	Keşla	13 August 2019
Summer 2019	FW	(Turkey)	Attila Yıldırım	Kirsehir Belediyespor	
7 January 2020	MF	(Azerbaijan)	Ehtiram Shahverdiyev	Gabala	7 January 2020
24 June 2020	FW	(Azerbaijan)	Şehriyar Aliyev	Keşla	24 June 2020
24 June 2020	DF	(Azerbaijan)	Sertan Taşqın	Zira	24 June 2020
30 June 2020	DF	(Azerbaijan)	Rail Malikov	Keşla	24 August 2020
30 June 2020	MF	(Israel)	Amir Agayev	Atromitos	14 August 2020
30 June 2020	MF	(Russia)	Aleksey Isayev	Sabah	9 July 2020
30 June 2020	MF	(Azerbaijan)	Ilgar Gurbanov		
30 June 2020	FW	(Azerbaijan)	Amil Yunanov	Sabail	
1 July 2020	FW	(Iran)	Mehdi Sharifi	Paykan	

== Friendlies ==
14 January 2020	Sumgayit (Azerbaijan)	3 – 4	(Hungary) Kaposvári Rákóczi	Antalya, Turkey
AZST (UTC+4)	Sharifi 14'; K.Najafov 68'; Yunanov 76'	Report	M.Ádám 31'; R.Nagy 49'; Balázs 51', 89'

18 January 2020	Sumgayit (Azerbaijan)	1 – 1	(Romania) Politehnica Iași	Antalya, Turkey
AZST (UTC+4)	Khayal Najafov	Report	Goal

21 January 2020	Sumgayit (Azerbaijan)	1 – 0	(Poland) Arka Gdynia	Antalya, Turkey
AZST (UTC+4)	Agayev 6'	Report

25 January 2020	Sumgayit (Azerbaijan)	4 – 2	(Kazakhstan) Shakhter Karagandy	Antalya, Turkey
AZST (UTC+4)	Agayev 28'; Yunanov 49', 62'; Sadykhov 59'	Report	J.Payruz 3'; Shkodra 30'

10 June 2020	Sumgayit	2 – 2	Gabala	Baku
AZT (UTC+4)	E.Jafarguliyev 8'; Yunanov 73'	Report	R.Huseynov 43'; Rajsel 60' (pen.)	Stadium: Kapital Bank Arena

== Competitions ==
=== Azerbaijan Premier League ===
==== Results summary ====
Overall								Home						Away					
Pld	W	D	L	GF	GA	GD	Pts	W	D	L	GF	GA	GD	W	D	L	GF	GA	GD
20	6	5	9	24	32	−8	23	3	3	4	12	16	−4	3	2	5	12	16	−4

Last updated: 7 March 2020.
Source: See Results

==== Results by round ====
Round	1	2	3	4	5	6	7	8	9	10	11	12	13	14	15	16	17	18	19	20
Ground	A	H	A	H	H	A	H	A	H	A	A	H	A	H	A	H	H	A	H	A
Result	W	L	L	L	W	L	D	W	L	D	W	W	L	D	D	W	L	L	D	L
Position	1	4	6	6	5	6	6	5	4	5	4	4	4	4	5	4	4	4	4	5

Updated to match(es) played on 8 March 2020. Source: See Results
A = Away; H = Home; W = Win; D = Draw; L = Loss

==== Results ====
17 August 2019 1	Gabala	0 – 2	Sumgayit	Qabala
19:00 AZT (UTC+4)	Mammadov (yellow card) 26' (yellow-red card) 84'; Gigauri (yellow card) 54'; Ramaldanov (yellow card) 84'; S.Guliyev (yellow card) 90'	Report	Sharifi 13', 29' (yellow card) 70'; Babaei (yellow card) 40'; Agayev (yellow card) 60'; Mustafayev (yellow card) 84'; Jannatov (yellow card) 86'	Stadium: Gabala City Stadium; Attendance: 500; Referee: Rauf Jabbarov

24 August 2019 2	Sumgayit	0 – 3	Sabail	Sumqayit
19:00 AZT (UTC+4)	Hüseynov (yellow card) 31'; Yunanov (yellow card) 64'; S.Aliyev (yellow card) 72'	Report	Ramazanov 10' (pen.), 69'; F.Muradbayli (yellow card) 36'; Rahimov 51'	Stadium: Kapital Bank Arena; Attendance: 1,300; Referee: Vuqar Həsənli

1 September 2019 3	Neftçi	2 – 1	Sumgayit	Baku
19:00 AZT (UTC+4)	Krivotsyuk (yellow card) 26' (yellow-red card) 90+4'; Aghayev (yellow card) 32'; Mahmudov (yellow card) 35' (goal) 64'; Joseph-Monrose 90+3'; Mammadov (yellow card) 90+4'	Report	M.Khachayev (yellow card) 19' (yellow-red card) 82'; Sharifi 33' (pen.) (yellow card) 51'; Agayev (yellow card) 44'; Hüseynov (red card) 90+4'	Stadium: Bakcell Arena; Attendance: 1,000; Referee: Sabuhi Bayramov

14 September 2019 4	Sumgayit	1 – 2	Zira	Sumgayit
18:00 AZT (UTC+4)	S.Aliyev (yellow card) 12'; Mutallimov 16' (o.g.); Sharifi (yellow card) 70'; Malikov (yellow card) 88'	Report	Rodríguez 5'; Huseynov (yellow card) 44'; Bakrač (yellow card) 67'; B.Hasanalizade (yellow card) 77'; Tigroudja 88'	Stadium: Kapital Bank Arena; Attendance: 1,400; Referee: Kamal Umudlu

21 September 2019 5	Sumgayit	1 – 0	Sabah	Sumgayit
17:30 AZT (UTC+4)	Khodzhaniyazov (yellow card) 2'; S.Tashkin 34'; E.Badalov (yellow card) 37'; Jannatov (yellow card) 71'; Sharifi (yellow card) 73' (yellow-red card) 79'	Report	Abışov (yellow card) 24'; U.Diallo (yellow card) 28'; Khalilzade (yellow card) 37'; Ivanović (yellow card) 69'; Mustafazade (yellow card) 79'	Stadium: Kapital Bank Arena; Attendance: 1,000; Referee: Ravan Həmzəzadə

27 September 2019 6	Qarabağ	2 – 0	Sumgayit	Baku
19:00 AZT (UTC+4)	A.Huseynov (yellow card) 44'; Quintana 45+2'; Míchel (yellow card) 81'; Emreli 90'	Report	S.Aliyev (yellow card) 31'; Mustafayev (yellow card) 53'; E.Badalov (yellow card) 57'	Stadium: Azersun Arena; Attendance: 700; Referee: Elcin Məsiyev

5 October 2019 7	Sumgayit	0 – 0	Keşla	Sumgayit
17:00 AZT (UTC+4)	E.Jafarguliyev (yellow card) 37'; E.Badalov (yellow card) 51'; S.Abdullazade (yellow card) 82'; S.Aliyev (yellow card) 90+3'	Report	Gurbanov (yellow card) 6'; Qirtimov (yellow card) 65'	Stadium: Kapital Bank Arena; Attendance: 1,000; Referee: Sabuhi Bayramov

20 October 2019 8	Sabail	0 – 2	Sumgayit	Baku
19:30 AZT (UTC+4)	E.Yagublu (yellow card) 3'; Mira.Abbasov (yellow card) 28'; Ramazanov (yellow card) 76'	Report	S.Tashkin (yellow card) 27'; Babaei 47'; Jannatov (yellow card) 87'; Khodzhaniyazov (yellow card) 90'; E.Jafarguliyev 90+4' (yellow card) 90+4'	Stadium: Bayil Arena; Attendance: 400; Referee: Rahim Həsənov

27 October 2019 9	Sumgayit	2 – 4	Neftçi	Sumqayit
17:30 AZT (UTC+4)	Sharifi 6' (pen.) (yellow card) 71'; E.Badalov (yellow card) 27'; S.Tashkin (yellow card) 51'; Sadykhov 90+3'	Report	M.Kane (yellow card) 4'; Mahmudov 28' (pen.), 82' (pen.); Dabo 34', 83'; Stanković (yellow card) 45+4'	Stadium: Kapital Bank Arena; Attendance: 1,500; Referee: Aliyar Ağayev

3 November 2019 10	Zira	2 – 2	Sumgayit	Zirə
15:00 AZT (UTC+4)	Kgaswane 3' (yellow card) 44'; Scarlatache (yellow card) 27'; I.Muradov (yellow card) 45+3'; Gadze (yellow card) 49' (goal) 57'; Norde (yellow card) 74'	Report	Mustafayev (yellow card) 15'; Babaei 28' (pen.); Khodzhaniyazov (yellow card) 33'; Agayev 81'; Hüseynov (yellow card) 90+1'	Stadium: Zira Olympic Sport Complex Stadium; Attendance: 500; Referee: Sabuhi Bayramov

10 November 2019 11	Sabah	1 – 3	Sumgayit	Masazır
16:30 AZT (UTC+4)	U.Diallo 32'; S.Seyidov (yellow card) 51'; Imamverdiyev (yellow card) 66'; Mustafazade (yellow card) 67'; Khalilzade (yellow card) 70'	Report	E.Jafarguliyev (yellow card) 35'; S.Tashkin (yellow card) 39'; Babaei 56'; S.Ahmadov (yellow card) 61'; Sharifi 76'; Agayev 90+5'	Stadium: Alinja Arena; Attendance: 2,000; Referee: Ingilab Məmmədov

22 November 2019 12	Sumgayit	2 – 1	Qarabağ	Sumqayit
19:00 AZT (UTC+4)	Mustafayev (yellow card) 36'; Isayev (yellow card) 59'; Babaei 65', 69' (yellow card) 68'; E.Jafarguliyev (yellow card) 89'; Agayev (yellow card) 90+1'	Report	Romero 36'; I.Ibrahimli (red card) 72'; Míchel (yellow card) 90+2'; Emreli (yellow card) 90+2'	Stadium: Kapital Bank Arena; Attendance: 1,200; Referee: Rauf Jabbarov

30 November 2019 13	Keşla	2 – 1	Sumgayit	Baku
15:00 AZT (UTC+4)	Bojović 16'; T.Bayramli (yellow card) 42'; Kamara (yellow card) 46'; Frutos 54'; Ismayilov (yellow card) 86'	Report	Isayev (yellow card) 11'; Jannatov (yellow card) 43'; Agayev 66' (yellow card) 87'; S.Ahmadov (yellow card) 83'; S.Aliyev (yellow card) 85'	Stadium: Bayil Arena; Attendance: 1,000; Referee: Elcin Məsiyev
Note: Match played at the Bayil Arena in Baku, instead of Keşla's regular ASK Arena in Baku.

8 December 2019 14	Sumgayit	1 – 1	Gabala	Sumqayit
15:00 AZT (UTC+4)	Babaei 31' (pen.) (yellow card) 64'; K.Najafov (yellow card) 45'; E.Jafarguliyev (yellow card) 85'	Report	Ferreiroa (yellow card) 20' (goal) 23'; Gigauri (yellow card) 45'; G.Aliyev (yellow card) 45' (yellow-red card) 86'; Nazirov (red card) 65'; Niasse (yellow card) 86'	Stadium: Kapital Bank Arena; Attendance: 1,100; Referee: Vuqar Həsənli

1 February 2020 15	Neftçi	1 – 1	Sumgayit	Baku
17:30 AZT (UTC+4)	Joseph-Monrose (yellow card) 12'; Jahan (yellow card) 30'; Stanković (red card) 41'; Krivotsyuk (yellow card) 65'; Dabo 72'	Report	Sadykhov 43'	Stadium: Eighth Kilometer District Stadium; Attendance: 850; Referee: Kamal Umudlu

8 February 2020 16	Sumgayit	2 – 1	Zira	Sumqayit
17:30 AZT (UTC+4)	E.Jafarguliyev 13'; Agayev (yellow card) 41'; Babaei (yellow card) 41'; K.Najafov (yellow card) 53' (goal) 66'; S.Ahmadov (yellow card) 90+3'	Report	Scarlatache (yellow card) 31'; I.Muradov (yellow card) 33' (yellow-red card) 37'; Ramazanov 35' (red card) 68'; J.Huseynov (yellow card) 41'; Tigroudja (yellow card) 41'; Gadze (yellow card) 52'; N.Suleymanov (yellow card) 84'; Anton (yellow card) 90+4'	Stadium: Kapital Bank Arena; Attendance: 800; Referee: Orkhan Mammadov

15 February 2020 17	Sumgayit	1 – 2	Sabah	Sumqayit
17:00 AZT (UTC+4)	Sadykhov (yellow card) 67'; Agayev 90+1'; E.Jafarguliyev (yellow card) 90+3'	Report	S.Seyidov 59'; Kökçü 61'; Marina (yellow card) 74'; Cociuc (yellow card) 81'; Ivanović (yellow card) 90+4'; Stamenković (yellow card) 90+5'	Stadium: Kapital Bank Arena; Attendance: 1,000; Referee: Ingilab Məmmədov

23 February 2020 18	Qarabağ	1 – 0	Sumgayit	Baku
18:00 AZT (UTC+4)	T.Bayramov (yellow card) 20'; Míchel (yellow card) 41'; Emreli 49' (yellow card) 74' (yellow-red card) 90+2'; S.Məhəmmədəliyev (yellow card) 90+5'	Report	P.Najafov (yellow card) 60'; Isayev (yellow card) 62'; Yunanov (yellow card) 86'	Stadium: Tofiq Bahramov Republican Stadium; Attendance: 600; Referee: Ravan Həmzəzadə

29 February 2020 19	Sumgayit	2 – 2	Keşla	Sumqayit
16:00 AZT (UTC+4)	Babaei 4'; S.Aliyev (yellow card) 54'; Sadykhov 59'; Mustafayev (yellow card) 69'; Gurbanov (yellow card) 90+1'; Khodzhaniyazov (yellow card) 90+5'	Report	Isgandarli 10'; Meza (yellow card) 28'; Flores (yellow card) 70'; S.Alkhasov 81' (yellow card) 90+6'	Stadium: Kapital Bank Arena; Attendance: 1,200; Referee: Kamal Umudlu

7 March 2020 20	Gabala	5 – 0	Sumgayit	Qabala
16:00 AZT (UTC+4)	Gigauri (yellow card) 33'; Rajsel 34', 89' (pen.) (yellow card) 59'; A.Seydiyev 37'; R.Muradov 52'; Žunić 63'	Report	Mustafayev (yellow card) 23'; S.Aliyev (yellow card) 87'	Stadium: Gabala City Stadium; Attendance: 250; Referee: Rahim Hasanov

14 March 2020 21	Sumgayit	–	Sabail	Sumqayit
AZT (UTC+4)				Stadium: Kapital Bank Arena
Note: Match postponed on 13 March due to the COVID-19 pandemic.

20 March 2020 22	Zira	–	Sumgayit	Zirə
AZT (UTC+4)				Stadium: Zira Olympic Sport Complex Stadium
Note: Match postponed on 13 March due to the COVID-19 pandemic.

==== League table ====
Pos	Team	Pld	W	D	L	GF	GA	GD	Pts	Qualification or relegation
2	Neftçi Baku	20	10	7	3	33	14	+19	37	Qualification for the Europa League first qualifying round
3	Keşla	20	8	6	6	27	21	+6	30	Qualification for the Europa League first qualifying round
4	Sumgayit	20	6	5	9	24	32	−8	23	Qualification for the Europa League first qualifying round
5	Zira	20	6	5	9	25	37	−12	23	
6	Sabah	20	5	6	9	19	27	−8	21	

Source: Soccerway
Rules for classification: 1) Points; 2) Head-to-head points; 3) Head-to-head goal difference; 4) Head-to-head goals scored; 5) Head-to-head away goals scored (only if two teams); 6) Goal difference; 7) Goals scored.

=== Azerbaijan Cup ===
4 December 2019 First Round	Sumgayit	2 – 0	Zagatala	Sumqayit
17:00 AZT (UTC+4)	Sadykhov 19'; Agayev 70'	Report	K.Muslumov (yellow card) 19'; I.Qədirzadə (yellow card) 56'; A.Shemonayev (yellow card) 90+1'; R.Şabanov (yellow card) 90+1'	Stadium: Kapital Bank Arena; Attendance: 450; Referee: Nicat İsmayıllı

16 December 2019 Quarterfinal 1st leg	Neftçi	0 – 1	Sumgayit	Baku
18:00 AZT (UTC+4)	M.Kane (yellow card) 25'; Dário (yellow card) 52'; Krivotsyuk (yellow card) 90+2'	Report	Babaei (yellow card) 35'; Sadykhov 48'; Jannatov (yellow card) 87'	Stadium: Eighth Kilometer District Stadium; Attendance: 550; Referee: Elcin Masiyev

20 December 2019 Quarterfinal 2nd leg	Sumgayit	0 – 0 (1 – 0 agg.)	Neftçi	Sumqayit
17:00 AZT (UTC+4)	E.Jafarguliyev (yellow card) 69'	Report	Buludov (yellow card) 21'; Mahmudov (yellow card) 75'; Dabo (yellow card) 82'; Mustivar (yellow card) 90+4'	Stadium: Kapital Bank Arena; Attendance: 1,500; Referee: Ravan Hamzazada

21 April 2020 Semifinal 1st leg	Sumgayit	–	Qarabağ	Sumqayit
AZT (UTC+4)				Stadium: Kapital Bank Arena
Note: Match postponed due to the COVID-19 pandemic

28 April 2020 Semifinal 2nd leg	Qarabağ	– (– agg.)	Sumgayit	Baku
AZT (UTC+4)				Stadium: Tofiq Bahramov Republican Stadium
Note: Match postponed due to the COVID-19 pandemic

== Squad statistics ==
As of match played 7 March 2020

=== Appearances and goals ===
No.	Pos	Nat	Player	Total		Premier League		Azerbaijan Cup	
No.	Pos	Nat	Player	Apps	Goals	Apps	Goals	Apps	Goals
1	GK	(Russia) RUS	Mehdi Jannatov	21	0	19	0	2	0
2	DF	(Azerbaijan) AZE	Rail Malikov	4	0	3	0	1	0
3	DF	(Azerbaijan) AZE	Vurğun Hüseynov	13	0	11	0	0+2	0
4	DF	(Azerbaijan) AZE	Shahriyar Aliyev	18	0	16	0	2	0
5	DF	(Russia) RUS	Dzhamaldin Khodzhaniyazov	19	0	17	0	2	0
6	MF	(Azerbaijan) AZE	Vugar Mustafayev	18	0	15	0	3	0
8	FW	(Iran) IRI	Peyman Babaei	21	7	16+3	7	2	0
9	FW	(Azerbaijan) AZE	Amil Yunanov	16	0	2+14	0	0	0
10	MF	(Israel) ISR	Amir Agayev	22	5	18+1	4	2+1	1
11	MF	(Azerbaijan) AZE	Elgun Nabiyev	4	0	0+3	0	1	0
13	GK	(Azerbaijan) AZE	Aydin Bayramov	2	0	1	0	1	0
14	DF	(Azerbaijan) AZE	Elvin Badalov	19	0	11+5	0	3	0
17	MF	(Azerbaijan) AZE	Murad Khachayev	3	0	2	0	0+1	0
18	MF	(Azerbaijan) AZE	Suleyman Ahmadov	18	0	10+6	0	0+2	0
20	MF	(Azerbaijan) AZE	Rüfət Abdullazadə	4	0	0+3	0	1	0
22	DF	(Azerbaijan) AZE	Sertan Tashkin	20	1	16+2	1	2	0
28	MF	(Azerbaijan) AZE	Sabuhi Abdullazade	13	0	8+5	0	0	0
30	MF	(Azerbaijan) AZE	Nabi Mammadov	1	0	0+1	0	0	0
44	MF	(Azerbaijan) AZE	Elvin Jafarguliyev	20	2	15+2	2	3	0
46	MF	(Russia) RUS	Aleksey Isayev	12	0	11	0	1	0
50	MF	(Azerbaijan) AZE	Ilgar Gurbanov	5	0	0+4	0	1	0
70	FW	(Iran) IRI	Mehdi Sharifi	19	5	12+4	5	0+3	0
90	MF	(Azerbaijan) AZE	Rahim Sadykhov	18	5	13+2	3	3	2
97	MF	(Azerbaijan) AZE	Khayal Najafov	11	1	5+4	1	2	0
Players away from Sumgayit on loan:
Players who left Sumgayit during the season:
7	MF	(Azerbaijan) AZE	Ehtiram Shahverdiyev	2	0	0+1	0	1	0

=== Goal scorers ===
Place	Position	Nation	Number	Name	Premier League	Azerbaijan Cup	Total
1	FW	(Iran)	8	Peyman Babaei	7	0	7
2	FW	(Iran)	70	Mehdi Sharifi	5	0	5
2	MF	(Israel)	10	Amir Agayev	4	1	5
2	MF	(Azerbaijan)	90	Ragim Sadykhov	3	2	5
5	MF	(Azerbaijan)	44	Elvin Cafarguliyev	2	0	2
6	DF	(Azerbaijan)	22	Sertan Taşqın	1	0	1
6	MF	(Azerbaijan)	97	Khayal Najafov	1	0	1
6				Own goal	1	0	1
				TOTALS	24	3	27

=== Clean sheet ===
Place	Position	Nation	Number	Name	Premier League	Azerbaijan Cup	Total
1	GK	(Russia)	1	Mehdi Jannatov	4	2	6
2	GK	(Azerbaijan)	13	Aydin Bayramov	0	1	1
				TOTALS	4	3	7

=== Disciplinary record ===
Number	Nation	Position	Name	Premier League		Azerbaijan Cup		Total	
Number	Nation	Position	Name	Yellow card	Red card	Yellow card	Red card	Yellow card	Red card
1	(Russia)	GK	Mehdi Jannatov	4	0	1	0	5	0
2	(Azerbaijan)	DF	Rail Malikov	1	1	0	0	1	1
3	(Azerbaijan)	DF	Vurğun Hüseynov	2	1	0	0	2	1
4	(Azerbaijan)	DF	Shahriyar Aliyev	7	0	0	0	7	0
5	(Russia)	DF	Dzhamaldin Khodzhaniyazov	4	0	0	0	4	0
6	(Azerbaijan)	MF	Vugar Mustafayev	6	0	1	0	7	0
8	(Iran)	FW	Peyman Babaei	4	0	1	0	5	0
9	(Azerbaijan)	FW	Amil Yunanov	2	0	0	0	2	0
10	(Israel)	MF	Amir Agayev	5	0	0	0	5	0
14	(Azerbaijan)	DF	Elvin Badalov	4	0	0	0	4	0
17	(Azerbaijan)	MF	Murad Khachayev	2	1	0	0	2	1
18	(Azerbaijan)	MF	Suleyman Ahmadov	3	0	0	0	3	0
20	(Azerbaijan)	MF	Rüfət Abdullazadə	0	0	1	0	1	0
22	(Azerbaijan)	DF	Sertan Tashkin	3	0	0	0	3	0
28	(Azerbaijan)	MF	Sabuhi Abdullazade	1	0	0	0	1	0
44	(Azerbaijan)	MF	Elvin Jafarguliyev	6	0	1	0	7	0
46	(Russia)	MF	Aleksey Isayev	3	0	0	0	3	0
50	(Azerbaijan)	MF	Ilgar Gurbanov	1	0	0	0	1	0
70	(Iran)	FW	Mehdi Sharifi	6	1	0	0	6	1
90	(Azerbaijan)	MF	Rahim Sadykhov	1	0	0	0	1	0
97	(Azerbaijan)	MF	Khayal Najafov	3	0	0	0	3	0
Players who left Sumgayit during the season:
			TOTALS	68	3	5	0	73	3
