= 2020–21 Sumgayit FK season =

Sumgayit
2020-21 season
- Chairman: Riad Rafiyev
- Manager: Aykhan Abbasov
- Stadium: Kapital Bank Arena
- Premier League: 3rd
- Azerbaijan Cup: Runners Up
- UEFA Europa League: First qualifying round vs Shkëndija
- Top goalscorer: League: Ali Ghorbani (9); All: Ali Ghorbani (10)
Home colours	Away colours	Third colours

The Sumgayit FK 2020–21 season was Sumgayit's tenth Azerbaijan Premier League season, and eleventh season in their history.

== Season events ==
On 17 July, Sumgayit announced the signing of Tellur Mutallimov and Elvin Mammadov from Zira to one-year contracts.

On 14 August, Sumgayit announced the signing of Ali Ghorbani from Sepahan to a one-year contract, with the option of an additional year. The following day, 15 August, Sumgayit announced the signing of Karam Sultanov from Caspiy, also on a one-year contract with the option of a second.

On 19 August, Sumgayit announced the singing of Adam Hemati from Pars Jonoubi Jam to a one-year contract with the option of a second.

On 8 September, Sumgayit announced the singing of Huseyn Jafarov from União de Leiria to a three-year contract.

On 18 September, Sumgayit announced the singing of Javid Imamverdiyev from Keşla.

On 27 November, Sumgayit's match against Gabala scheduled for 28 November was postponed due to players testing positive for COVID-19.

On 11 January, Sumgayit re-signed striker Mehdi Sharifi from Paykan, with Hojjat Haghverdi joining the following day.

On 15 January, Sumgayit announced the signing of Dmitri Naghiyev to a 2.5-year contract from Dinamo-Auto Tiraspol. Three days later, 18 January, Karam Sultanov left Sumgayit by mutual consent.

== Squad ==
As of match played 19 May 2021

No.	Name	Nationality	Position	Date of birth (age)	Signed from	Signed in	Contract ends	Apps.	Goals
Goalkeepers
1	Mehdi Jannatov	(Russia)	GK	26 January 1992 (aged 29)	Anzhi Makhachkala	2017		77	0
13	Aydin Bayramov	(Azerbaijan)	GK	18 February 1996 (aged 25)	Neftchi Baku	2019		16	0
36	Suleyman Suleymanov	(Azerbaijan)	GK	29 May 1998 (aged 22)	Gabala	2017		0	0
Defenders
3	Vurğun Hüseynov	(Azerbaijan)	DF	25 April 1988 (aged 33)	Gabala	2013		204	1
4	Hojjat Haghverdi	(Iran)	DF	3 February 1993 (aged 28)	Paykan	2021	2021	20	0
5	Dzhamaldin Khodzhaniyazov	(Russia)	DF	18 July 1996 (aged 24)	BATE Borisov	2019		46	3
14	Elvin Badalov	(Azerbaijan)	DF	14 June 1995 (aged 25)	Sabah	2019		56	0
21	Jabir Amirli	(Azerbaijan)	DF	6 January 1997 (aged 24)	loan from Neftçi	2021		10	0
37	Nicat Aliyev	(Azerbaijan)	DF	24 September 2001 (aged 19)	Academy	2020		1	0
78	Dmitri Naghiyev	(Azerbaijan)	DF	27 November 1995 (aged 25)	Dinamo-Auto Tiraspol	2021	2023	10	0
Midfielders
6	Vugar Mustafayev	(Azerbaijan)	MF	5 August 1994 (aged 26)	Zira	2019		49	0
7	Tellur Mutallimov	(Azerbaijan)	MF	8 April 1995 (aged 26)	Zira	2020	2021	29	3
8	Sabuhi Abdullazade	(Azerbaijan)	MF	18 December 2001 (aged 19)	Academy	2017		31	1
10	Rahim Sadykhov	(Azerbaijan)	MF	18 July 1996 (aged 24)	Torpedo Moscow	2019		51	14
15	Huseyn Jafarov	(Azerbaijan)	MF	14 May 2001 (aged 20)	União de Leiria	2020	2023	0	0
16	Sanan Ağayev	(Azerbaijan)	MF	16 June 2004 (aged 16)	Academy	2021		1	0
17	Murad Khachayev	(Azerbaijan)	MF	14 April 1998 (aged 23)	Shakhtar Donetsk	2019		40	4
18	Suleyman Ahmadov	(Azerbaijan)	MF	25 November 1999 (aged 21)	Qarabağ	2018		57	2
20	Rufat Abdullazade	(Azerbaijan)	MF	17 January 2001 (aged 20)		2017		24	0
22	Javid Imamverdiyev	(Azerbaijan)	MF	1 August 1990 (aged 30)	Keşla	2020		46	7
30	Nabi Mammadov	(Azerbaijan)	MF	20 August 1999 (aged 21)	Academy	2020		2	0
33	Eltun Turabov	(Azerbaijan)	MF	18 February 1997 (aged 24)	loan from Sabah	2020		16	0
60	Elvin Mammadov	(Azerbaijan)	MF	18 July 1988 (aged 32)	Zira	2020	2021	41	2
97	Khayal Najafov	(Azerbaijan)	MF	19 December 1997 (aged 23)	Academy	2016		123	2
Forwards
9	Ali Ghorbani	(Azerbaijan)	FW	18 September 1990 (aged 30)	Sepahan	2020	2021 (+1)	25	10
11	Mehdi Sharifi	(Iran)	FW	16 August 1992 (aged 28)	Paykan	2021	2021	33	5
19	Nurlan Quliyev	(Azerbaijan)	FW	16 February 1998 (aged 23)	Keşla	2020		1	0
42	Elnur Jafarov	(Azerbaijan)	FW	28 March 1997 (aged 24)		2019		0	0
Left during the season
4	Karam Sultanov	(Kazakhstan)	DF	15 April 1996 (aged 25)	Caspiy	2020	2021 (+1)	7	0
21	Adam Hemati	(Canada)	MF	22 January 1995 (aged 26)	Pars Jonoubi Jam	2020	2021 (+1)	13	0

== Transfers ==
=== In ===
Date	Position	Nationality	Name	From	Fee	Ref.
1 July 2020	FW	(Azerbaijan)	Nurlan Quliyev	Keşla	Undisclosed	
17 July 2020	MF	(Azerbaijan)	Tellur Mutallimov	Zira	Free	
17 July 2020	MF	(Azerbaijan)	Elvin Mammadov	Zira	Undisclosed	
14 August 2020	FW	(Azerbaijan)	Ali Ghorbani	Sepahan	Undisclosed	
15 August 2020	DF	(Kazakhstan)	Karam Sultanov	Caspiy	Undisclosed	
19 August 2020	MF	(Canada)	Adam Hemati	Pars Jonoubi Jam	Undisclosed	
8 September 2020	MF	(Azerbaijan)	Huseyn Jafarov	União de Leiria	Undisclosed	
18 September 2020	MF	(Azerbaijan)	Javid Imamverdiyev	Keşla	Undisclosed	
11 January 2021	FW	(Iran)	Mehdi Sharifi	Paykan	Undisclosed	
12 January 2021	DF	(Iran)	Hojjat Haghverdi	Paykan	Undisclosed	
15 January 2021	DF	(Azerbaijan)	Dmitri Naghiyev	Dinamo-Auto Tiraspol	Undisclosed	

=== Loans in ===
Date from	Position	Nationality	Name	From	Date to	Ref.
20 August 2020	MF	(Azerbaijan)	Eltun Turabov	Sabah	End of season	
4 January 2021	DF	(Azerbaijan)	Jabir Amirli	Neftçi	End of season	

=== Released ===
Date	Position	Nationality	Name	Joined	Date	Ref
31 December 2020	MF	(Canada)	Adam Hemati			
18 January 2021	DF	(Kazakhstan)	Karam Sultanov	Shakhter Karagandy	28 February 2021	
30 June 2021	GK	(Azerbaijan)	Mehdi Jannatov	Zira	1 July 2021	
30 June 2021	MF	(Azerbaijan)	Javid Imamverdiyev			
30 June 2021	MF	(Azerbaijan)	Khayal Najafov	Neftçi	1 July 2021	
30 June 2021	FW	(Iran)	Mehdi Sharifi			

== Friendlies ==
10 January 2021	Sumgayit	3 – 2	Zira	Baku
AZT (UTC+4)	Imamverdiyev 7', 37'; Hüseynov 50'	Report	Volkovi 34'; Gurbanli 90+3'	Stadium: Dalga Arena

14 January 2021	Sumgayit	1 – 1	Gabala	Sumgait
15:00 AZT (UTC+4)	Khachayev 24'	Report	Rajsel 42'	Stadium: Kapital Bank Arena

== Competitions ==
=== Premier League ===
==== Results summary ====
Overall								Home						Away					
Pld	W	D	L	GF	GA	GD	Pts	W	D	L	GF	GA	GD	W	D	L	GF	GA	GD
28	10	9	9	30	31	−1	39	4	5	5	14	13	+1	6	4	4	16	18	−2

Last updated: 19 May 2021.
Source: See Results

==== Results by round ====
Round	1	2	3	4	5	6	7	8	9	10	11	12	13	14	15	16	17	18	19	20	21	22	23	24	25	26	27	28
Ground	H	A	H	H	A	H	A	H	A	A	H	A	H	A	H	H	A	H	A	H	A	A	H	A	H	A	H	A
Result	L	W	W	D	D	W	W	D	L	L	L	D	L	W	W	D	L	D	D	D	W	L	W	D	L	W	L	W
Position	7	5	1	1	1	1	1	1	2	4	4	4	4	4	4	4	4	4	4	4	4	4	3	3	4	3	4	3

Updated to match(es) played on 19 May 2021. Source: See Results
A = Away; H = Home; W = Win; D = Draw; L = Loss

==== Results ====
21 August 2020 1	Sumgayit	0 – 1	Keşla	Sumqayit
18:30 AZT (UTC+4)	Khachayev (yellow card) 2'; Turabov (yellow card) 24'; Najafov (yellow card) 83'	Report	Hajiyev (yellow card) 39'; Salahli 90+4'; Isgandarli (yellow card) 90+5'	Stadium: Kapital Bank Arena; Attendance: 0 Referee: Elcin Mesiyev
Note: Match played behind closed doors due to the COVID-19 pandemic.

11 September 2020 2	Neftçi	0 – 2	Sumgayit	Baku
19:00 AZT (UTC+4)	Mbodj (yellow card) 28'; Krivotsyuk (yellow card) 77' (yellow-red card) 83'	Report	Ghorbani 14', 46'; Hüseynov (yellow card) 29'	Stadium: Bakcell Arena; Attendance: 0 Referee: Ravan Hamzazada
Note: Match played behind closed doors due to the COVID-19 pandemic.

19 September 2020 3	Sumgayit	2 – 1	Sabail	Sumqayit
19:15 AZT (UTC+4)	Ahmadov 10'; Ghorbani (yellow card) 25' (goal) 33'; Najafov (yellow card) 37'; Mustafayev (yellow card) 88'; Turabov (yellow card) 90+1'	Report	Aliyev 22' (yellow card) 74'; Naghiyev (yellow card) 62'; P.Keshavarz (yellow card) 79'; Hajiyev (yellow card) 85'	Stadium: Kapital Bank Arena; Attendance: 0 Referee: Orkhan Mammadov
Note: Match played behind closed doors due to the COVID-19 pandemic.

25 September 2020 4	Sumgayit	2 – 2	Qarabağ	Sumqayit
19:00 AZT (UTC+4)	Mustafayev (yellow card) 42'; Ghorbani 52' (yellow card) 90+5'; Khodzhaniyazov 54'	Report	Kwabena 58'; Ibrahimli (yellow card) 65'; Ozobić 90+5'	Stadium: Kapital Bank Arena; Attendance: 0 Referee: Kamal Umudlu
Note: Match played behind closed doors due to the COVID-19 pandemic.

3 October 2020 5	Gabala	1 – 1	Sumgayit	Qabala
14:00 AZT (UTC+4)	Utzig 44'; Gigauri (yellow card) 49'; Muradov (yellow card) 68'; Adeniyi (yellow card) 76'; Huseynov (yellow card) 81'; Vukčević (yellow card) 85'	Report	Ghorbani 26'; Mustafayev (yellow card) 71'	Stadium: Gabala City Stadium; Attendance: 0 Referee: Aliyar Agayev
Note: Match played behind closed doors due to the COVID-19 pandemic.

17 October 2020 6	Sumgayit	2 – 1	Zira	Sumqayit
16:00 AZT (UTC+4)	Mustafayev (yellow card) 18'; Sadikhov 30' (pen.); Badalov (yellow card) 43'; Khodzhaniyazov (yellow card) 45'; Mutallimov 59'; Turabov (yellow card) 83'; Bayramov (yellow card) 90+1'	Report	Rahimov (yellow card) 30'; Volkovi 35'; Diniyev (red card) 90+3'	Stadium: Kapital Bank Arena; Attendance: 0 Referee: Rahim Hasanov
Note: Match played behind closed doors due to the COVID-19 pandemic.

25 October 2020 7	Sabah	1 – 2	Sumgayit	Masazır
14:00 AZT (UTC+4)	Marina (yellow card) 43'; Ivanović (yellow card) 52'; Sheydayev (yellow card) 60'; Rzayev (yellow card) 62'; Imamverdiyev 65' (o.g.); Vujadinović (yellow card) 76'	Report	Badalov (yellow card) 19'; Ghorbani 28'; Najafov (yellow card) 60'; Hüseynov (yellow card) 63'; Mutallimov (yellow card) 85'; Abdullazade 90+5'	Stadium: Bank Respublika Arena; Attendance: 0 Referee: Elcin Masiyev
Note: Match played behind closed doors due to the COVID-19 pandemic.

1 November 2020 8	Sumgayit	0 – 0	Neftçi	Sumqayit
14:00 AZT (UTC+4)	Hemati (yellow card) 52'; Abdullazade (yellow card) 74'	Report		Stadium: Kapital Bank Arena; Attendance: 0 Referee: Rauf Jabbarov
Note: Match played behind closed doors due to the COVID-19 pandemic.

7 November 2020 9	Sabail	2 – 1	Sumgayit	Baku
16:00 AZT (UTC+4)	Aliyev 42'; P.Keshavarz (yellow card) 65'; Naghiyev 77' (yellow card) 77'; Manafov (yellow card) 82'	Report	Hemati (yellow card) 8'; Khachayev (yellow card) 44'; Khodzhaniyazov (yellow card) 50'; Sadykhov 84' (pen.); Hüseynov (yellow card) 90+3'; Mammadov (yellow card) 90+6'	Stadium: Bayil Arena; Attendance: 0 Referee: Aliyar Agayev
Note: Match played behind closed doors due to the COVID-19 pandemic.

21 November 2020 10	Qarabağ	6 – 1	Sumgayit	Baku
16:00 AZT (UTC+4)	Guerrier 28', 45+1'; Zoubir 34', 89'; Bayramov 54'; Emreli 75'	Report	Najafov (yellow card) 33'; Khodzhaniyazov (yellow card) 35'; Mustafayev (yellow card) 40'; Abdullazade (yellow card) 64'; Mutallimov 87'	Stadium: Azersun Arena; Attendance: 0 Referee: Ingilab Mammadov
Note: Match played behind closed doors due to the COVID-19 pandemic.

30 November 2020 11	Sumgayit	0 – 1	Gabala	Sumqayit
14:00 AZT (UTC+4)	Turabov (yellow card) 30'; Hüseynov (yellow card) 58'; N.Mammadov (yellow card) 80'; Khachayev (yellow card) 86'	Report	Utzig 16'; Ahmadov (yellow card) 53'; Huseynov (yellow card) 61'; Muradov (yellow card) 64'; Nazirov (yellow card) 90+2'	Stadium: Kapital Bank Arena; Attendance: 0 Referee: Rahim Hasanov
Note: Match originally scheduled for 28 November, but postponed on 27 November 2020. Match played behind closed doors due to the COVID-19 pandemic.

20 December 2020 12	Zira	2 – 2	Sumgayit	Zirə
16:00 AZT (UTC+4)	Ramazanov 56'; Aliyev 62'; Hajili (yellow card) 63'	Report	Badalov (yellow card) 5'; Khachayev 11' (yellow card) 55'; Sadikhov 57'; Mustafayev (yellow card) 89'	Stadium: Zira Olympic Sport Complex Stadium; Attendance: 0 Referee: Raad Ahmadov
Note: Match originally scheduled for 5 December, but postponed. Match played behind closed doors due to the COVID-19 pandemic.

24 December 2020 13	Sumgayit	1 – 2	Sabah	Sumqayit
16:00 AZT (UTC+4)	Najafov 31' (yellow card) 59'; Mustafayev (yellow card) 39'; Bayramov (yellow card) 64'	Report	Alkhasov 26'; Isayev 65' (pen.); Ivanović (yellow card) 69'; A.Diallo (yellow card) 75'	Stadium: Kapital Bank Arena; Attendance: 0 Referee: Ingilab Mammadov
Note: Match played behind closed doors due to the COVID-19 pandemic.

22 January 2021 14	Keşla	0 – 1	Sumgayit	Baku
16:00 AZT (UTC+4)	Kamara (yellow card) 18'; Salahli (yellow card) 22'; Isgandarli (yellow card) 36'; E.Mustafayev (red card) 38'	Report	E.Mustafayev 3' (o.g.); Ghorbani (yellow card) 38'; Khodzhaniyazov (yellow card) 50'	Stadium: ASK Arena; Attendance: 0 Referee: Aliyar Agayev
Note: Match played behind closed doors due to the COVID-19 pandemic.

13 February 2021 15	Sumgayit	3 – 0	Sabail	Sumqayit
16:00 AZT (UTC+4)	Khachayev 26'; Mutallimov 33'; Turabov (yellow card) 47'; Ghorbani 83' (pen.)	Report	Imnadze (yellow card) 21'; P.Keshavarz (yellow card) 25' (yellow-red card) 55'; Aliyev (yellow card) 35'; Amirguliyev (yellow card) 55'; Petrovikj (yellow card) 59'; U.Abbasov (yellow card) 68'; Agayev (red card) 90+5'	Stadium: Kapital Bank Arena; Attendance: 0 Referee: Vugar Hasanli
Note: Match played behind closed doors due to the COVID-19 pandemic.

19 February 2021 16	Sumgayit	0 – 0	Qarabağ	Sumqayit
18:00 AZT (UTC+4)	Turabov (yellow card) 84'; Jannatov (yellow card) 90+6'	Report	Emreli (yellow card) 44'	Stadium: Kapital Bank Arena; Attendance: 0 Referee: Raad Ahmadov
Note: Match played behind closed doors due to the COVID-19 pandemic.

25 February 2021 17	Gabala	1 – 0	Sumgayit	Qabala
15:00 AZT (UTC+4)	Vukčević (yellow card) 29'; Adeniyi 51'; Gigauri (yellow card) 60'; Shahverdiyev (yellow card) 65'; Nazirov (yellow card) 89'; J.Huseynov (yellow card) 90'; Utzig (yellow card) 90+2'	Report	Najafov (yellow card) 9'; Khodzhaniyazov (yellow card) 60'; Abdullazade (yellow card) 79'	Stadium: Gabala City Stadium; Attendance: 0 Referee: Sabuhi Bayramov
Note: Match played behind closed doors due to the COVID-19 pandemic.

3 March 2021 18	Sumgayit	0 – 0	Zira	Sumqayit
16:00 AZT (UTC+4)	Ghorbani (yellow card) 13'; Mutallimov (yellow card) 61'	Report	Richard (yellow card) 27'; Hajili (yellow card) 60'; Aliyev (yellow card) 79'	Stadium: Kapital Bank Arena; Attendance: 0 Referee: Ingilab Mammadov
Note: Match played behind closed doors due to the COVID-19 pandemic.

8 March 2021 19	Sabah	1 – 1	Sumgayit	Masazır
16:00 AZT (UTC+4)	Khalilzade 34'; Hasanalizade (yellow card) 90+2'	Report	Badalov (yellow card) 45+1'; Mustafayev (yellow card) 57'; Khodzhaniyazov 69'	Stadium: Bank Respublika Arena; Attendance: 0 Referee: Aliyar Agayev
Note: Match played behind closed doors due to the COVID-19 pandemic.

13 March 2021 20	Sumgayit	2 – 2	Keşla	Sumqayit
19:15 AZT (UTC+4)	Ghorbani (yellow card) 46'; Khodzhaniyazov 49'; Sadykhov 80'; Hüseynov (yellow card) 88'	Report	Salahli 3', 74'; Akhundov (yellow card) 90+4'; Guliyev (yellow card) 90+8'	Stadium: Kapital Bank Arena; Attendance: 0 Referee: Elcin Mesiyev
Note: Match played behind closed doors due to the COVID-19 pandemic.

4 April 2021 21	Neftçi	0 – 2	Sumgayit	Baku
16:30 AZT (UTC+4)	Kané (yellow card) 25'; Mbodj (yellow card) 39'; Stanković (yellow card) 41'; Joseph-Monrose (yellow card) 41'; Honda (yellow card) 64'; Mahmudov (yellow card) 72'; Alaskarov (yellow card) 77'; Krivotsyuk (yellow card) 87'	Report	Sadykhov 5', 42' (pen.); Najafov (yellow card) 33'; Ghorbani (yellow card) 55'; Khodzhaniyazov (yellow card) 72'	Stadium: Eighth Kilometer District Stadium; Attendance: 0 Referee: Ingilab Mammadov

11 April 2021 22	Qarabağ	4 – 1	Sumgayit	Baku
19:15 AZT (UTC+4)	Zoubir 45+1', 71'; Khodzhaniyazov 47' (o.g.); Jafarguliyev (yellow card) 74'; Ozobić 79'	Report	Ghorbani 60'; Mustafayev (yellow card) 66'; Sharifi (yellow card) 82'	Stadium: Azersun Arena; Attendance: 0 Referee: Rauf Jabbarov
Note: Match played behind closed doors due to the COVID-19 pandemic.

16 April 2021 23	Sumgayit	2 – 0	Gabala	Sumqayit
20:15 AZT (UTC+4)	Mutallimov (yellow card) 45+3'; Hüseynov (yellow card) 49'; Ghorbani (yellow card) 59' (goal) 75'; Sadikhov 66'	Report	Mirzayev (yellow card) 46'; Muradov (yellow card) 54'; Musayev (yellow card) 63'	Stadium: Kapital Bank Arena; Attendance: 0 Referee: Vugar Hasanli
Note: Match played behind closed doors due to the COVID-19 pandemic.

25 April 2021 24	Zira	0 – 0	Sumgayit	Zirə
20:00 AZT (UTC+4)	Richard (yellow card) 26'; Chantakias (yellow card) 44'; Hajili (yellow card) 52'	Report	Badalov (yellow card) 2'; Haghverdi (yellow card) 47'; Ahmadov (yellow card) 55'; Mutallimov (yellow card) 76'; Mammadov (yellow card) 76'	Stadium: Zira Olympic Sport Complex Stadium; Attendance: 0 Referee: Ingilab Mammadov
Note: Match played behind closed doors due to the COVID-19 pandemic.

4 May 2021 25	Sumgayit	0 – 2	Sabah	Sumqayit
20:15 AZT (UTC+4)	Haghverdi (yellow card) 34'; Khodzhaniyazov (yellow card) 37' (red card) 85'; Najafov (yellow card) 45'; Mustafayev (yellow card) 56'; Sharifi (yellow card) 60'	Report	Marina 40' (yellow card) 87'; Ochihava (yellow card) 61'; Fofana 69'	Stadium: Kapital Bank Arena; Attendance: 0 Referee: Kamal Umudlu
Note: Match played behind closed doors due to the COVID-19 pandemic.

8 May 2021 26	Keşla	0 – 1	Sumgayit	Baku
18:00 AZT (UTC+4)	Abang (yellow card) 40'; Kamara (yellow card) 63'; Gurbanov (yellow card) 65'; Tounkara (yellow card) 79'	Report	Hüseynov (yellow card) 26'; Turabov (yellow card) 45+1'; Badalov (yellow card) 70'; Sadykhov 78' (pen.); Jannatov (yellow card) 82'	Stadium: ASK Arena; Attendance: 0 Referee: Raad Ahmadov
Note: Match played behind closed doors due to the COVID-19 pandemic.

14 May 2021 27	Sumgayit	0 – 1	Neftçi	Sumqayit
19:00 AZT (UTC+4)	Hüseynov (yellow card) 45'; Sharifi (yellow card) 76'; Haghverdi (yellow card) 88'; E.Mammadov (yellow card) 90+1'	Report	Joseph-Monrose (yellow card) 8'; Bougrine (yellow card) 36'; Stanković 45'	Stadium: Kapital Bank Arena; Attendance: 0 Referee: Rauf Jabbarov
Note: Match played behind closed doors due to the COVID-19 pandemic.

19 May 2021 28	Sabail	0 – 1	Sumgayit	Baku
18:00 AZT (UTC+4)	Naghiyev (yellow card) 9' (yellow-red card) 90+3'; Petrovikj (yellow card) 62'	Report	Khachayev 43'; Ahmadov (yellow card) 90'; Jannatov (yellow card) 90+4'	Stadium: Bayil Arena; Attendance: 0 Referee: Raad Ahmadov
Note: Match played behind closed doors due to the COVID-19 pandemic.

==== League table ====
Pos	Team	Pld	W	D	L	GF	GA	GD	Pts	Qualification
1	Neftçi Baku (C)	28	18	5	5	47	25	+22	59	Qualification for the Champions League first qualifying round
2	Qarabağ	28	16	9	3	64	18	+46	57	Qualification to Europa Conference League second qualifying round
3	Sumgayit	28	10	9	9	30	31	−1	39	Qualification to Europa Conference League second qualifying round
4	Zira	28	8	14	6	28	28	0	38	
5	Sabah	28	7	8	13	28	38	−10	29	

Source: Soccerway
Rules for classification: 1) Points; 2) Head-to-head points; 3) Head-to-head goal difference; 4) Head-to-head goals scored; 5) Head-to-head away goals scored (only if two teams); 6) Goal difference; 7) Goals scored.
(C) Champions

=== Azerbaijan Cup ===
1 February 2021 Quarterfinal 1st leg	Sumgayit	0 – 1	Sabail	Sumqayit
16:00 AZT (UTC+4)	Khodzhaniyazov (yellow card) 17'; Najafov (yellow card) 23'	Report	Garahmadov (yellow card) 8'; Yunanov 12'; Imnadze (yellow card) 45+2'	Stadium: Kapital Bank Arena; Attendance: 0 Referee: Rauf Jabbarov
Note: Match played behind closed doors due to the COVID-19 pandemic.

6 February 2021 Quarterfinal 2nd leg	Sabail	1 – 2 (2 – 2 (a) agg.)	Sumgayit	Baku
18:00 AZT (UTC+4)	P.Keshavarzi (yellow card) 56'; Aliyev (yellow card) 90+5'; Ismayilov 90+6' (pen.)	Report	Sadikhov 20' (pen.); Ghorbani 23' (yellow card) 36'; Khodzhaniyazov (yellow card) 57'; Mustafayev (yellow card) 85'; Jannatov (yellow card) 90+1'	Stadium: Bayil Arena; Attendance: 0 Referee: Orkhan Mammadov
Note: Match played behind closed doors due to the COVID-19 pandemic in Azerbaijan.

21 April 2021 Semifinal 1st leg	Sumgayit	0 – 0	Qarabağ	Sumqayit
20:30 AZT (UTC+4)		Report	Ibrahimli (yellow card) 45'	Stadium: Kapital Bank Arena; Attendance: 0 Referee: Raad Ahmadov
Note: Match played behind closed doors due to the COVID-19 pandemic in Azerbaijan.

29 April 2021 Semifinal 2nd leg	Qarabağ	0 – 0 (0 – 0 agg.) (4 – 5 p)	Sumgayit	Baku
17:00 AZT (UTC+4)	B.Huseynov (yellow card) 88'; Mahammadaliyev (yellow card) 115'	Report	Haghverdi (yellow card) 60'	Stadium: Tofiq Bahramov Republican Stadium; Attendance: 0 Referee: Aliyar Agayev
	Penalties
	Medvedev (penalty scored); Bayramov (penalty scored); Garayev (penalty scored); Romero (penalty scored); Andrade (penalty missed); Medina (penalty missed)		Khodzhaniyazov (penalty scored); Mammadov (penalty missed); Hüseynov (penalty scored); Najafov (penalty scored); Haghverdi (penalty scored); Mustafayev (penalty scored)
Note: Match played behind closed doors due to the COVID-19 pandemic in Azerbaijan.

==== Final ====
24 May 2021	Sumgayit	1 – 2	Keşla	Masazır
19:30 AZT (UTC+4)	Bojović 3' (o.g.); Khodzhaniyazov (yellow card) 16'; Najafov (yellow card) 46'; Mustafayev (yellow card) 69'	Report	Aliyev (yellow card) 33' (goal) 37'; Bojović 57'	Stadium: Bank Respublika Arena; Referee: Aliyar Agayev

=== UEFA Europa League ===
==== Qualifying rounds ====
27 August 2020 First qualifying round	Sumgayit (Azerbaijan)	0 – 2	(North Macedonia) Shkëndija	Sumqayit, Azerbaijan
20:00 AZT (UTC+4)	Mammadov (yellow card) 12'; Mutallimov (yellow card) 34' (yellow-red card) 89'; Hüseynov (yellow card) 55'; S.Abdullazade (yellow card) 85'	Report	Ibraimi 56' (pen.); Doriev 89' (pen.)	Stadium: Kapital Bank Arena; Attendance: 0 Referee: Arman Ismuratov (Kazakhstan)
Note: Match played behind closed doors due to the COVID-19 pandemic in Europe.

== Squad statistics ==
As of Match played 24 May 2021

=== Appearances and goals ===
No.	Pos	Nat	Player	Total		Premier League		Azerbaijan Cup		Europa League	
No.	Pos	Nat	Player	Apps	Goals	Apps	Goals	Apps	Goals	Apps	Goals
1	GK	(Russia) RUS	Mehdi Jannatov	21	0	18	0	2	0	1	0
3	DF	(Azerbaijan) AZE	Vurğun Hüseynov	21	0	16+2	0	2	0	1	0
4	DF	(Iran) IRN	Hojjat Haghverdi	20	0	15	0	5	0	0	0
5	DF	(Russia) RUS	Dzhamaldin Khodzhaniyazov	28	3	23	3	4	0	1	0
6	MF	(Azerbaijan) AZE	Vugar Mustafayev	31	0	25	0	4+1	0	1	0
7	MF	(Azerbaijan) AZE	Tellur Mutallimov	29	3	24+1	3	3	0	1	0
8	MF	(Azerbaijan) AZE	Sabuhi Abdullazade	16	1	5+9	1	0+1	0	0+1	0
9	FW	(Azerbaijan) AZE	Ali Ghorbani	25	10	17+2	9	4+1	1	1	0
10	MF	(Azerbaijan) AZE	Rahim Sadikhov	33	9	25+2	8	3+2	1	1	0
11	FW	(Iran) IRN	Mehdi Sharifi	14	0	6+4	0	1+3	0	0	0
13	GK	(Azerbaijan) AZE	Aydin Bayramov	14	0	10+1	0	3	0	0	0
14	DF	(Azerbaijan) AZE	Elvin Badalov	31	0	24+1	0	5	0	1	0
17	MF	(Azerbaijan) AZE	Murad Khachayev	28	3	22+1	3	5	0	0	0
18	MF	(Azerbaijan) AZE	Suleyman Ahmadov	20	1	14+3	1	1+1	0	1	0
19	FW	(Azerbaijan) AZE	Nurlan Quliyev	1	0	0+1	0	0	0	0	0
20	MF	(Azerbaijan) AZE	Rufat Abdullazade	18	0	3+11	0	1+2	0	0+1	0
21	DF	(Azerbaijan) AZE	Jabir Amirli	10	0	3+4	0	3	0	0	0
22	MF	(Azerbaijan) AZE	Javid Imamverdiyev	14	0	4+9	0	1	0	0	0
30	MF	(Azerbaijan) AZE	Nabi Mammadov	1	0	0+1	0	0	0	0	0
33	MF	(Azerbaijan) AZE	Eltun Turabov	16	0	9+5	0	1+1	0	0	0
37	DF	(Azerbaijan) AZE	Nijat Aliyev	1	0	0+1	0	0	0	0	0
60	MF	(Azerbaijan) AZE	Elvin Mammadov	23	0	5+13	0	1+3	0	1	0
65	MF	(Azerbaijan) AZE	Sanan Ağayev	1	0	0+1	0	0	0	0	0
78	DF	(Azerbaijan) AZE	Dmitri Naghiyev	10	0	6+1	0	3	0	0	0
97	MF	(Azerbaijan) AZE	Khayal Najafov	31	1	24+2	1	3+1	0	1	0
Players away from Sumgayit on loan:
Players who left Sumgayit during the season:
4	DF	(Kazakhstan) KAZ	Karam Sultanov	7	0	2+5	0	0	0	0	0
21	MF	(Canada) CAN	Adam Hemati	13	0	8+4	0	0	0	0+1	0

=== Goal scorers ===
Place	Position	Nation	Number	Name	Premier League	Azerbaijan Cup	Europa League	Total
1	FW	(Azerbaijan)	9	Ali Ghorbani	9	1	0	10
2	MF	(Azerbaijan)	10	Rahim Sadikhov	8	1	0	9
3	MF	(Azerbaijan)	7	Tellur Mutallimov	3	0	0	3
3	DF	(Russia)	5	Dzhamaldin Khodzhaniyazov	3	0	0	3
3	MF	(Azerbaijan)	17	Murad Khachayev	3	0	0	3
6				Own goal	1	1	0	2
7	MF	(Azerbaijan)	18	Suleyman Ahmadov	1	0	0	1
7	MF	(Azerbaijan)	8	Sabuhi Abdullazade	1	0	0	1
7	MF	(Azerbaijan)	97	Khayal Najafov	1	0	0	1
				TOTALS	29	3	0	32

=== Clean sheets ===
Place	Position	Nation	Number	Name	Premier League	Azerbaijan Cup	Europa League	Total
1	GK	(Russia)	1	Mehdi Jannatov	10	0	0	10
2	GK	(Azerbaijan)	13	Aydin Bayramov	2	2	0	4
				TOTALS	11	2	0	13

Jannatov & Bayramov both played in Sumgayit's 2-0 victory over Neftçi on 11 September 2020

=== Disciplinary record ===
Number	Nation	Position	Name	Premier League		Azerbaijan Cup		Europa League		Total	
Number	Nation	Position	Name	Booked	Sent off (straight red)	Booked	Sent off (straight red)	Booked	Sent off (straight red)	Booked	Sent off (straight red)
1	(Russia)	GK	Mehdi Jannatov	3	0	1	0	0	0	4	0
3	(Azerbaijan)	DF	Vurğun Hüseynov	8	0	0	0	1	0	9	0
4	(Iran)	DF	Hojjat Haghverdi	3	0	1	0	0	0	4	0
5	(Russia)	DF	Dzhamaldin Khodzhaniyazov	7	1	3	0	0	0	10	1
6	(Azerbaijan)	MF	Vugar Mustafayev	10	0	2	0	0	0	12	0
7	(Azerbaijan)	MF	Tellur Mutallimov	4	0	0	0	2	1	6	1
8	(Azerbaijan)	MF	Sabuhi Abdullazade	1	0	0	0	1	0	2	0
9	(Azerbaijan)	FW	Ali Ghorbani	7	0	1	0	0	0	8	0
11	(Iran)	FW	Mehdi Sharifi	3	0	0	0	0	0	3	0
13	(Azerbaijan)	GK	Aydin Bayramov	2	0	0	0	0	0	2	0
14	(Azerbaijan)	DF	Elvin Badalov	6	0	0	0	0	0	6	0
17	(Azerbaijan)	MF	Murad Khachayev	4	0	0	0	0	0	4	0
18	(Azerbaijan)	MF	Suleyman Ahmadov	2	0	0	0	0	0	2	0
20	(Azerbaijan)	MF	Rufat Abdullazade	2	0	0	0	0	0	2	0
21	(Canada)	MF	Adam Hemati	2	0	0	0	0	0	2	0
30	(Azerbaijan)	MF	Nabi Mammadov	1	0	0	0	0	0	1	0
33	(Azerbaijan)	MF	Eltun Turabov	7	0	0	0	0	0	7	0
60	(Azerbaijan)	MF	Elvin Mammadov	3	0	0	0	1	0	4	0
97	(Azerbaijan)	MF	Khayal Najafov	8	0	2	0	0	0	10	0
Players who left Sumgayit during the season:
			TOTALS	83	1	10	0	5	1	98	2
