= 2019–20 Azerbaijan Cup =

Tournament details
- Country: Azerbaijan
- Teams: 12

Final positions
- Champions: not awarded

Tournament statistics
- Matches played: 12
- Goals scored: 30 (2.5 per match)

The 2019–20 Azerbaijan Cup is the 28th season of the annual cup competition in Azerbaijan, with Premier League side Gabala being the defending champions.

On 18 June 2020 the Azerbaijan Cup was abandoned due to the COVID-19 pandemic in Azerbaijan.

== Teams ==
| Round | Clubs remaining | Clubs involved | Winners from previous round | New entries this round | Leagues entering at this round |
|---|---|---|---|---|---|
| First round | 12 | 8 | 0 | 9 | 4 Premier League teams 4 First Division teams |
| Quarter-finals | 8 | 4 | 8 | 4 | 4 Premier League teams |
| Semi-finals | 4 | 4 | 4 | none | none |
| Final | 2 | 2 | 2 | none | none |

== Round and draw dates ==
| Round | Draw date | First match date | Ref. |
|---|---|---|---|
| First round | 13 November 2019 | 4 December 2019 | |
| Quarter-finals | 4 December 2019 | 15-16 & 19-20 December | |
| Semi-finals | not played | | |
| Final | not played | | |

== First round ==
| 3 December 2019 | Keşla (1) | 3 – 1 | (2) Kapaz | Baku |
| 15:00 AZT (UTC+4) | Flores (yellow card) 21' (yellow-red card) 45+2'; Amirjanov 25'; Guliyev (yellow card) 49'; Meza (yellow card) 66'; Xazar Mahmudov 56', 87' | Report | Elvin Nasibov (yellow card) 10'; Mammadov 45+3' | Stadium: ASK Arena; Attendance: 100; Referee: Rauf Allahverdiyev |

| 4 December 2019 | Zira (1) | 4 – 0 | (2) Qaradağ Lökbatan | Zirə |
| 14:00 AZT (UTC+4) | Mammadov 45' (pen.); Mushfig Ilyasov 55' (yellow card) 90+3'; Ibrahim Aslanli (yellow card) 65' (goal) 79'; Rodríguez 69' | Report | Firuddin Mövsümov (yellow card) 45+2'; Sahill Zeynalov (yellow card) 50'; Tural Mammarzayev (yellow card) 56'; Torul Xanlarov (yellow card) 90+4' | Stadium: Zira Olympic Sport Complex Stadium; Attendance: 100; Referee: Raad Ahmadov |

| 4 December 2019 | Sabah (1) | 5 – 0 | (2) Ağsu | Masazır |
| 15:00 AZT (UTC+4) | U.Diallo 29' (pen.); Mirzabeyov 61'; Arsen Agcabeyov 70'; Rojas 82', 90+3' | Report | Vusal Ibrahimov (yellow card) 23'; Shamo Hasanov (yellow card) 29'; Davud Mahmudov (yellow card) 30' | Stadium: Alinja Arena; Attendance: 30; Referee: Farid Haciyev |

| 4 December 2019 | Sumgayit (1) | 2 – 0 | (2) Zagatala | Sumqayit |
| 17:00 AZT (UTC+4) | Sadykhov 19'; Agayev 70' | Report | Kanan Muslumov (yellow card) 19'; Ibrahim Qədirzadə (yellow card) 56'; Aleksandr Shemonayev (yellow card) 90+1'; Rahman Şabanov (yellow card) 90+1' | Stadium: Kapital Bank Arena; Attendance: 450; Referee: Nicat İsmayıllı |

== Quarterfinals ==
| 15 December 2019 | Gabala (1) | 3 – 0 | (1) Sabah | Qabala |
| 15:00 AZT (UTC+4) | Clésio 19', 43'; Gismat Aliyev (yellow card) 30'; Volkovi (yellow card) 57'; Ulvi Isgandarov 87' (yellow card) 89' (yellow-red card) 90+3' | Report | U.Diallo (yellow card) 16'; A.Diallo (yellow card) 45+1'; Karim Diniyev (yellow card) 57'; Diniyev (yellow card) 75' | Stadium: Gabala City Stadium; Attendance: 400; Referee: Ingilab Mammadov |

| 19 December 2019 | Sabah (1) | 2 – 3 (2 – 6 agg.) | (1) Gabala | Masazır |
| 18:00 AZT (UTC+4) | Shakir Seyidov (yellow card) 38'; Khalilzade (yellow card) 60'; Mustafazade 62', 76'; Diniyev (yellow card) 90+2' | Report | Volkovi 22', 23'; Clésio 64'; Rovlan Muradov (yellow card) 67'; Yusif Nabiyev (yellow card) 76' | Stadium: Alinja Arena; Attendance: 700; Referee: Aliyar Ağayev |

| 15 December 2019 | Sabail (1) | 0 – 0 | (1) Zira | Baku |
| 17:00 AZT (UTC+4) | | Report | Bakrač (yellow card) 68' | Stadium: Bayil Arena; Attendance: 300; Referee: Kamal Umudlu |

| 19 December 2019 | Zira (1) | 1 – 0 (a.e.t.) (1 – 0 agg.) | (1) Sabail | Zirə |
| 15:00 AZT (UTC+4) | Kgaswane (yellow card) 68'; Jamalov (yellow card) 84'; J.Huseynov (yellow card) 89'; Gadze (yellow card) 89'; Mammadov (yellow card) 90+3'; Rodríguez 105+1'; Orkhan Sadigli (yellow card) 120+3' | Report | Amirguliyev (yellow card) 90+2'; Naghiyev (yellow card) 120+3' | Stadium: Zira Olympic Sport Complex Stadium; Attendance: 500; Referee: Rahim Hasanov |

| 16 December 2019 | Neftçi (1) | 0 – 1 | (1) Sumgayit | Baku |
| 18:00 AZT (UTC+4) | Mamadou Kane (yellow card) 25'; Dário (yellow card) 52'; Krivotsyuk (yellow card) 90+2' | Report | Babaei (yellow card) 35'; Sadykhov 48'; Jannatov (yellow card) 87' | Stadium: Eighth Kilometer District Stadium; Attendance: 550; Referee: Elcin Masiyev |

| 20 December 2019 | Sumgayit (1) | 0 – 0 (1 – 0 agg.) | (1) Neftçi | Sumqayit |
| 17:00 AZT (UTC+4) | Elvin Jafarguliyev (yellow card) 69' | Report | Buludov (yellow card) 21'; Mahmudov (yellow card) 75'; Dabo (yellow card) 82'; Mustivar (yellow card) 90+4' | Stadium: Kapital Bank Arena; Attendance: 1,500; Referee: Ravan Hamzazada |

| 16 December 2019 | Qarabağ (1) | 1 – 0 | (1) Keşla | Baku |
| 20:00 AZT (UTC+4) | Ismayil Ibrahimli 53' (yellow card) 77' | Report | Sadygov (yellow card) 82' | Stadium: Tofiq Bahramov Republican Stadium; Attendance: 500; Referee: Sabuhi Bayramov |
Note: Qarabağ played their home match at Tofiq Bahramov Republican Stadium, Baku, instead of their regular stadium Azersun Arena, Baku.

| 20 December 2019 | Keşla (1) | 1 – 3 (1 – 4 agg.) | (1) Qarabağ | Baku |
| 20:00 AZT (UTC+4) | Tural Bayramli (yellow card) 25'; Isgandarli (yellow card) 45+2'; Xazar Mahmudov (yellow card) 59' (goal) 67' | Report | Medvedev (yellow card) 19'; Emreli 20'; Romero 40'; Ailton (yellow card) 78'; Tural Bayramov 90+2' | Stadium: Bayil Arena; Attendance: 1,000; Referee: Rauf Jabbarov |
Note: Match played at the Bayil Arena in Baku, instead of Keşla's regular ASK Arena in Baku.

== Semifinals ==
22 April 2020
AZT (UTC+4)

| Gabala (1) | Cancelled | (1) Zira |

Gabala City Stadium, Qabala
29 April 2020
AZT (UTC+4)

| Zira (1) | Cancelled | (1) Gabala |

Zira Olympic Sport Complex Stadium, Zirə

22 April 2020
AZT (UTC+4)

| Sumgayit (1) | Cancelled | (1) Qarabağ |

Kapital Bank Arena, Sumqayit
29 April 2020
AZT (UTC+4)

| Qarabağ (1) | Cancelled | (1) Sumgayit |

Tofiq Bahramov Republican Stadium, Baku

== Final ==
16 May 2020
AZT (UTC+4)

| Cancelled |

Bank Respublika Arena, Baku

== Scorers ==
3 goals:

- (Mozambique) Clésio - Gabala
- (Azerbaijan) Xazar Mahmudov - Keşla

2 goals:

- (Georgia (country)) Davit Volkovi - Gabala
- (Azerbaijan) Rahim Sadykhov - Sumgayit
- (Azerbaijan) Bahlul Mustafazade - Sabah
- (Honduras) Roger Rojas - Sabah
- (Paraguay) Julio Rodríguez - Zira

1 goal:

- (Azerbaijan) Ulvi Isgandarov - Gabala
- (Azerbaijan) Nodar Mammadov - Kapaz
- (Azerbaijan) Ruslan Amirjanov - Keşla
- (Azerbaijan) Mahir Emreli - Qarabağ
- (Azerbaijan) Tural Bayramov - Qarabağ
- (Azerbaijan) Ismayil Ibrahimli - Qarabağ
- (Spain) Jaime Romero - Qarabağ
- (Azerbaijan) Arsen Agcabeyov - Sabah
- (Azerbaijan) Mahammad Mirzabeyov - Sabah
- (Mali) Ulysse Diallo - Sabah
- (Israel) Amir Agayev - Sumgayit
- (Azerbaijan) Ibrahim Aslanli - Zira
- (Azerbaijan) Mushfig Ilyasov - Zira
- (Azerbaijan) Elvin Mammadov - Zira
