= Mekhti Dzhenetov =

Azerbaijani football player (born 1992)

Personal information
- Full name: Mekhti Ramazanovich Dzhenetov
- Date of birth: 26 January 1992 (age 34)
- Place of birth: Makhachkala, Russia
- Height: 1.87 m (6 ft 2 in)
- Position: Goalkeeper

Team information
- Current team: Sumgayit
- Number: 1

Senior career*
Years	Team	Apps	(Gls)
2010–2017	Anzhi Makhachkala	1	(0)
2014–2015	→ Anzhi-2 Makhachkala (loan)	27	(0)
2016	→ Baltika Kaliningrad (loan)	0	(0)
2017–2021	Sumgayit	63	(0)
2021–2023	Zira	47	(0)
2023–	Sumgayit	80	(0)

International career^{‡}
2021–	Azerbaijan	2	(0)
- * Club domestic league appearances and goals as of 22 June 2026 ‡ National team caps and goals as of 6 June 2021

Mekhti Ramazanovich Dzhenetov (Azerbaijani: Mehdi Ramazan oğlu Cənnətov; Russian: Мехти Рамазанович Дженетов; born 26 January 1992) is a professional football player who plays as a goalkeeper for Sumgayit in the Azerbaijan Premier League. Born in Russia, he represents the Azerbaijan national team.

== Career ==
=== Club ===
Dzhenetov made his professional debut in the Russian Professional Football League for FC Anzhi-2 Makhachkala on 12 August 2014 in a game against FC Alania Vladikavkaz.

He made his Russian Football National League debut for FC Anzhi Makhachkala on 30 May 2015 in a game against FC Sakhalin Yuzhno-Sakhalinsk.

On 26 May 2021, Zira announced the signing of Dzhenetov on a two-year contract.

On 5 June 2023, Sumgayit announced the return of Dzhenetov on a three-year contract.

=== International ===
He was first called up to the Azerbaijan national football team in October 2019 for a friendly against Bahrain. He made his debut on 6 June 2021 in a friendly against Moldova.

== Career statistics ==
=== Club ===
As of match played 27 May 2023

Appearances and goals by club, season and competition
Club	Season	League			National Cup		Continental		Total	
Club	Season	Division	Apps	Goals	Apps	Goals	Apps	Goals	Apps	Goals
Anzhi Makhachkala	2010	Russian Premier League	0	0	0	0	-		0	0
Anzhi Makhachkala	2011–12	Russian Premier League	0	0	0	0	-		0	0
Anzhi Makhachkala	2012–13	Russian Premier League	0	0	0	0	0	0	0	0
Anzhi Makhachkala	2013–14	Russian Premier League	0	0	0	0	0	0	0	0
Anzhi Makhachkala	2014–15	Russian FNL	1	0	0	0	-		1	0
Anzhi Makhachkala	2015–16	Russian Premier League	0	0	0	0	-		0	0
Anzhi Makhachkala	2016–17	Russian Premier League	0	0	0	0	-		0	0
Anzhi Makhachkala	Total		1	0	0	0	0	0	1	0
Anzhi-2 Makhachkala	2014–15	Russian PFL	27	0	-		-		27	0
Baltika Kaliningrad (loan)	2016–17	Russian FNL	0	0	0	0	-		0	0
Sumgayit	2016–17	Azerbaijan Premier League	0	0	0	0	-		0	0
Sumgayit	2017–18	Azerbaijan Premier League	5	0	4	0	-		9	0
Sumgayit	2018–19	Azerbaijan Premier League	21	0	5	0	-		26	0
Sumgayit	2019–20	Azerbaijan Premier League	19	0	2	0	-		21	0
Sumgayit	2020–21	Azerbaijan Premier League	18	0	2	0	1	0	21	0
Sumgayit	Total		63	0	13	0	1	0	77	0
Zira	2021–22	Azerbaijan Premier League	24	0	3	0	-		27	0
Zira	2022–23	Azerbaijan Premier League	23	0	1	0	2	0	26	0
Zira	Total		47	0	4	0	2	0	53	0
Career total			138	0	17	0	3	0	158	0

=== International ===
As of match played 6 June 2021

Azerbaijan
Year	Apps	Goals
2021	1	0
Total	1	0
