= Mehdi Sharifi =

Iranian footballer

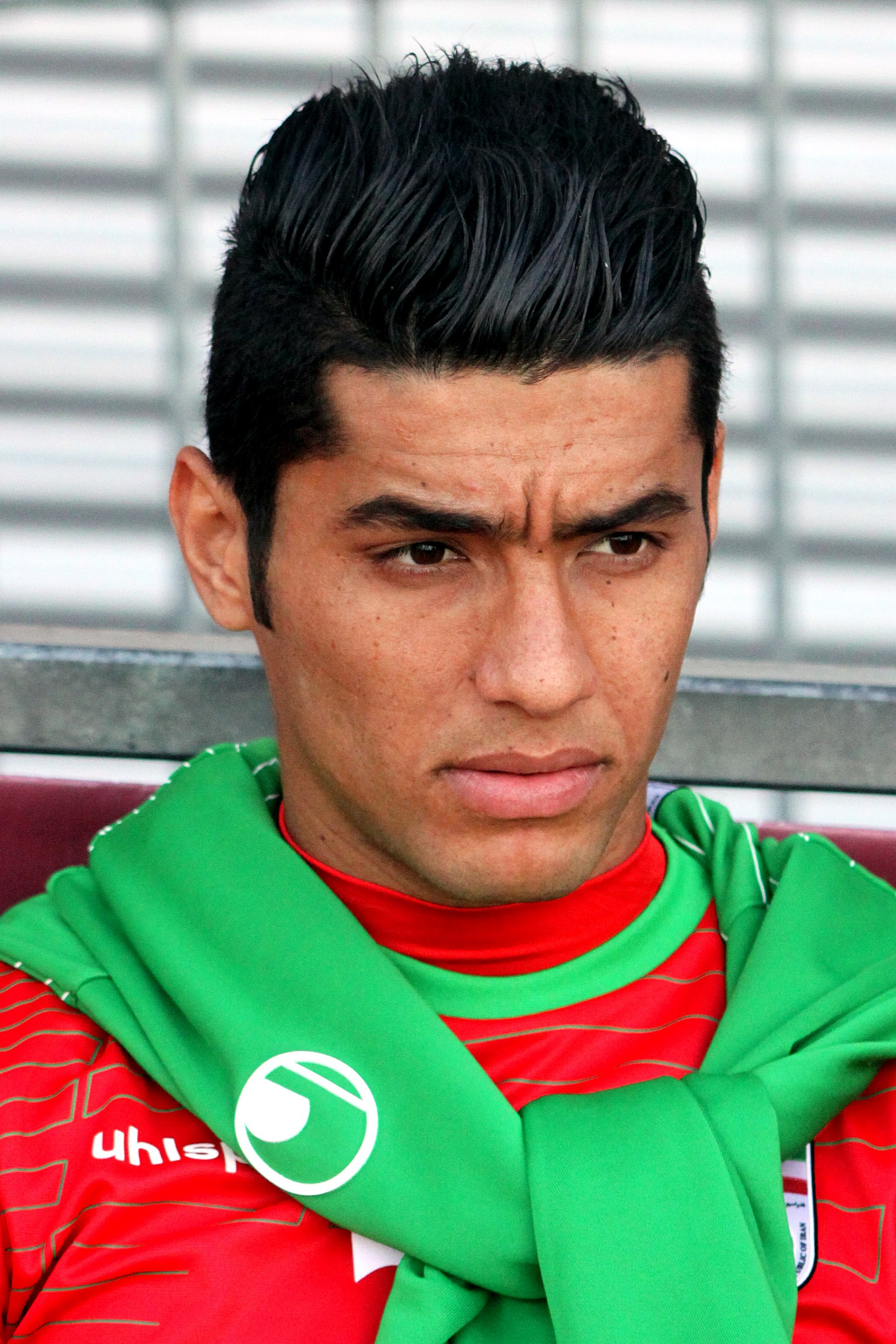
- Sharifi at the 2014 World Cup

Personal information
- Date of birth: 16 August 1992 (age 34)
- Place of birth: Isfahan, Iran
- Height: 1.79 m (5 ft 10 1/2 in)
- Position: Forward

Team information
- Current team: Fajr Sepasi
- Number: 9

Youth career
- 2001–2009: Zob Ahan
- 2009–2013: Sepahan

Senior career*
Years	Team	Apps	(Gls)
2010–2011	Sepahan Novin		
2012–2018	Sepahan	74	(27)
2016–2017	→ Tractor (loan)	37	(4)
2018–2019	Persepolis	4	(0)
2019–2020	Sumgayit	16	(5)
2020–2021	Paykan	0	(0)
2021	Sumgayit	10	(0)
2021–2022	Shahr Khodro	18	(0)
2022–2023	Darya Caspian	14	(1)
2023–2024	Khooshe Talaee	14	(2)
2024	Fajr Sepasi	15	(6)
2024–2025	Mes Rafsanjan	11	(1)
2025	Paykan	16	(5)
2025–2026	Mes Rafsanjan	11	(2)
2026–	Fajr Sepasi	17	(4)

International career
2012–2013	Iran U20	7	(1)
2014	Iran U23	2	(0)
2014–2016	Iran	4	(0)
- * Club domestic league appearances and goals as of 21 April 2025

Mehdi Sharifi (Persian: مهدی شریفی, born 16 August 1992) is an Iranian footballer who plays for Fajr Sepasi in the Persian Gulf Pro League as a forward.

== Club career ==
=== Zob Ahan ===
Before going to Sepahan, he was playing for Zob Ahan and he went to rivals Sepahan at age 15.

=== Sepahan ===
==== First years ====
From 2009 to 2012 he was a member of the Sepahan under-21 football team and became the top goal scorer in the Iran under-21 football league in the 2011–12 season.

He was promoted to the Sepahan first team squad in the summer of 2012. He played in a couple of internal and international friendly matches for Sepahan and scored a couple of goals, like his goal against FK Sarajevo.

==== 2013–14 ====
He made his debut for Sepahan in a match against Rah Ahan on 5 September 2013 and scored his first goal for Sepahan in the Iran Pro League in a 2–1 win over Tractor. His debut in the AFC Champions League coincided with him scoring the only goal for Sepahan in their 3–1 loss against Al-Sadd. Sharifi scored twice in Sepahan's 4–0 win over Al-Sadd in the AFC Champions League.

==== 2014–15 ====
Sharifi extended his contract with Sepahan until 2019 after agreeing on a new contract. He played pre-season friendlies against Arsenal Tula, Gloria Buzău and Fenerbahçe in which he scored three goals. He played his first official game for Sepahan in their 2–0 win over Paykan in the first week of the league. At the next match, Sharifi assisted twice to help Sepahan for their second consecutive 2–0 win, this time against Gostaresh. He scored his first goal of the season in a 3–1 win over Esteghlal on 14 August 2014. On 15 May 2015 Sharifi's two goals in Sepahan's 2–0 win against Saipa won the club the league title for the 2014–15 season.

==== 2015–16 ====
In the first match of the 2015–16 season against Esteghlal Khuzestan Sharifi scored en route to a Sepahan victory. After his good performances with Sepahan, Sharifi drew interest from Austrian champions SK Rapid Wien. Sharifi joined Tractor on loan for a two–year period to complete his conscription.

=== Persepolis ===
Sharifi joined Persepolis in June 2018 with a two–year contract.

== Club career statistics ==
- Last Update: 3 September 2019

Club performance			League		Cup		Continental		Total	
Season	Club	League	Apps	Goals	Apps	Goals	Apps	Goals	Apps	Goals
Iran			League		Hazfi Cup		Asia		Total	
2012–13	Sepahan	Persian Gulf Pro League	0	0	0	0	0	0	0	0
2013–14	Sepahan	Persian Gulf Pro League	19	8	1	0	6	4	26	12
2014–15	Sepahan	Persian Gulf Pro League	26	12	1	0	—		27	12
2015–16	Sepahan	Persian Gulf Pro League	16	4	4	3	0	0	20	7
2015–16	Tractor	Persian Gulf Pro League	6	1	—		4	1	10	2
2016–17	Tractor	Persian Gulf Pro League	18	3	3	0	—		21	3
2017–18	Tractor	Persian Gulf Pro League	13	0	3	5	—		16	5
2017–18	Sepahan	Persian Gulf Pro League	13	3	—				13	3
2018–19	Persepolis	Persian Gulf Pro League	4	0	3	0	1	0	8	0
Azerbaijan			League		Azerbaijan Cup		Europe		Total	
2019–20	Sumgayit	Azerbaijan Premier League	12	5	0	0	—		12	5
Career total			118	34	15	8	11	5	144	47

- Assists

Season	Team	Assists
17–18	Sepahan	2

== International career ==
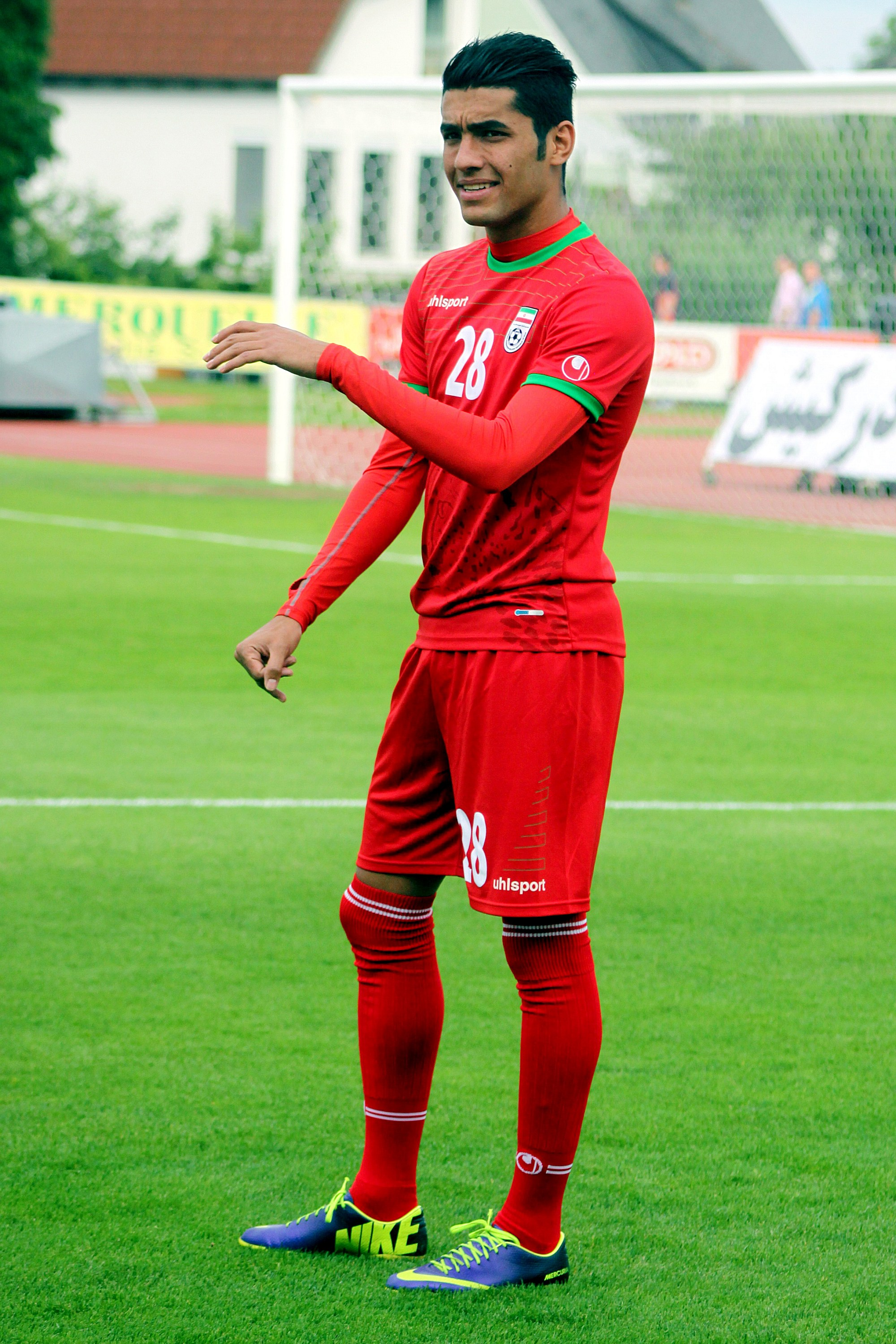
Sharifi before a friendly match with Montenegro, 26 May 2014

From 2012 to 2013, he was a member of the Iran national under-20 football team, in which he scored one goal in seven matches. On April 12, 2014, he was called up to the Iran national football team by Carlos Queiroz for their South Africa camp. He was later selected in Iran's 30-man provisional squad for the 2014 FIFA World Cup. He made his debut in a friendly match against Belarus on 18 May 2014. However, a month later Sharifi was not included in Iran's squad for the World Cup. He was named in the Iran U23 final list for Incheon 2014.

== Honours ==
=== Club ===
Sepahan

- Iran Pro League (1): 2014–15
- Hazfi Cup (1): 2012–13

Persepolis

- Iran Pro League (1): 2018–19
- Hazfi Cup (1): 2018–19
- Iranian Super Cup (1): 2019

=== Individual ===
- Iran Pro League Team of the Year: 2014–15
- Hazfi Cup top scorer: 2017–18
