= Amir Agayev =

Israeli footballer (born 1992)

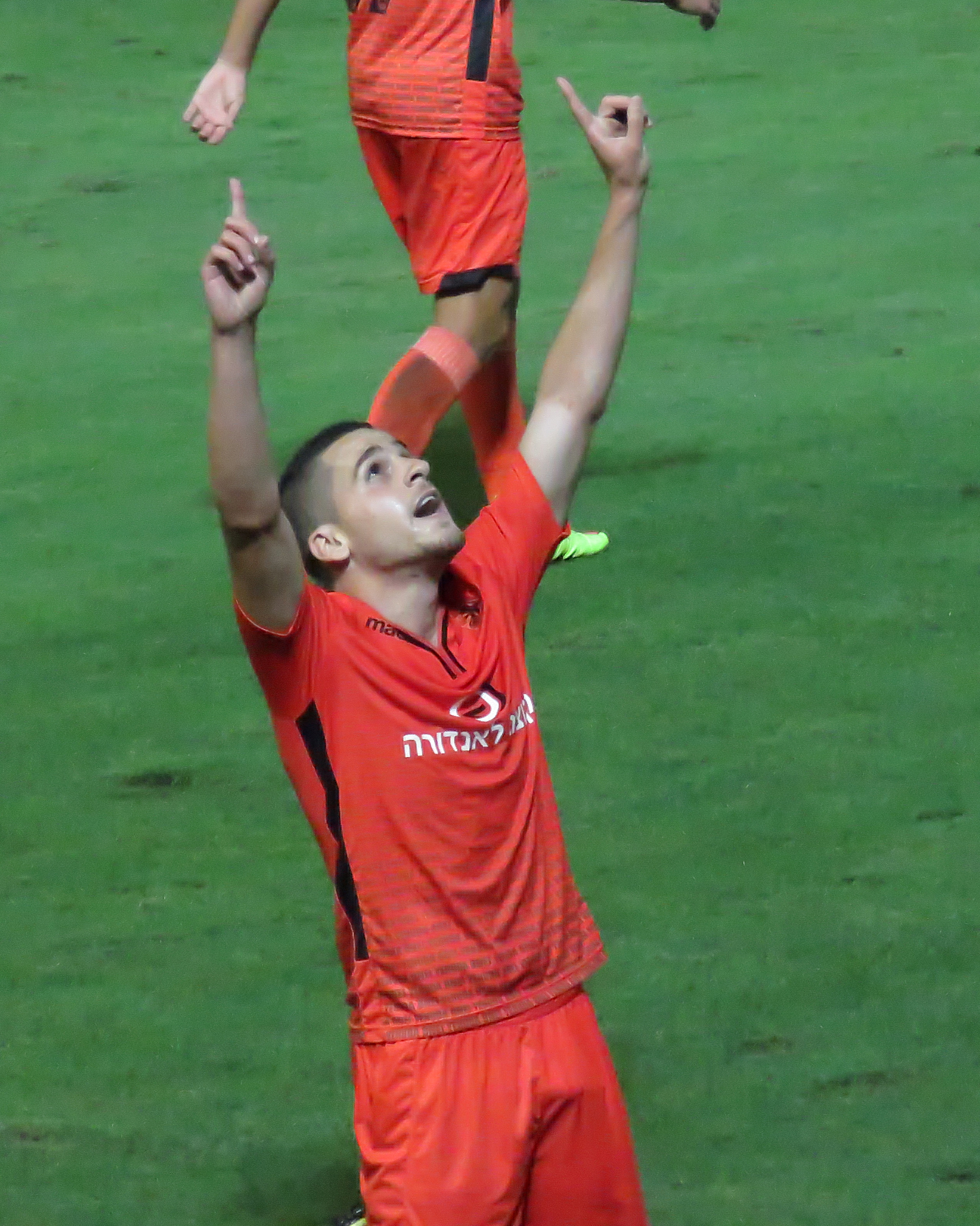
- Agayev playing for Bnei Yehuda Tel Aviv in 2015

Personal information
- Full name: Amir Agayev
- Date of birth: February 10, 1992 (age 34)
- Place of birth: Rishon LeZion, Israel
- Height: 1.75 m (5 ft 9 in)
- Position: Attacking midfielder

Youth career
- Bnei Yehuda Tel Aviv

Senior career*
Years	Team	Apps	(Gls)
2011–2016	Bnei Yehuda Tel Aviv	116	(18)
2016–2017	Omonia	6	(2)
2017	Bnei Yehuda Tel Aviv	6	(0)
2017–2018	Beitar Jerusalem	1	(0)
2018–2019	Hapoel Tel Aviv	15	(5)
2019–2020	Sumgayit	26	(6)
2020–2021	Atromitos	19	(3)
2021–2022	F.C. Ashdod	4	(1)
2022	Maccabi Bnei Reineh	17	(2)
2022–2023	Bnei Yehuda Tel Aviv	26	(2)
2023–2024	Sektzia Ness Ziona	25	(4)
2024	Hapoel Umm al-Fahm	5	(2)
2024–2025	F.C. Dimona	13	(5)

International career
2010–2011	Israel U19	5	(2)
2013–2014	Israel U21	4	(1)
- * Club domestic league appearances and goals

Amir Agayev (Hebrew: אמיר עגייב / אמיר עגאייב, Azerbaijani: Əmir Ağayev; born February 10, 1992) is a retired Israeli footballer who played as a attacking midfielder

== Early and personal life ==
Agayev was born in Rishon LeZion, Israel, to a family of Mizrahi Jews, Mountain Jews (Azerbaijani-Jewish) descent.

He married his girlfriend Sivan Agayev in August 2015.

== Club career ==
On 31 January 2019, Agayev signed a 1.5 year contract with Sumgayit FK.

On 14 August 2020, Agayev signed a 1+1 year contract with Atromitos.

On 13 September 2020, He made his debut in the Super League Greece for Atromitos match against Volos.

== International career ==
He has been an Israel national youth between 2010 and 2011. He was part of the Israel under-21 between 2013 and 2014.

On 22 August 2020, Agayev was called up by the senior Azerbaijan national team for a training camp in its capital city of Baku.
