= Dzhamaldin Khodzhaniyazov =

Russian footballer (born 1996)

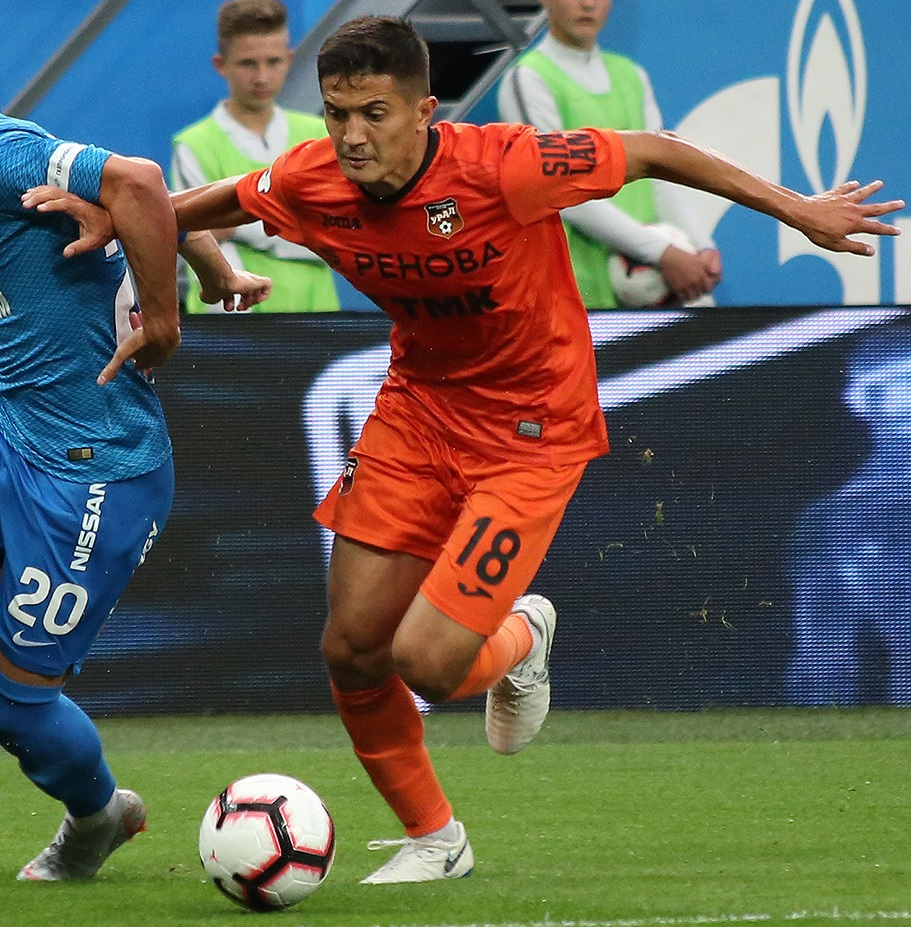
- Khodzhaniyazov with Ural Yekaterinburg in 2018

Personal information
- Full name: Dzhamaldin Abdukhalitovich Khodzhaniyazov
- Date of birth: 18 July 1996 (age 30)
- Place of birth: Baýramaly, Turkmenistan
- Height: 1.85 m (6 ft 1 in)
- Position: Centre-back

Team information
- Current team: Surkhon Termez
- Number: 5

Youth career
- Chilanzar Tashkent
- 2008–2012: Konoplyov football academy

Senior career*
Years	Team	Apps	(Gls)
2013–2015	Zenit Saint Petersburg	2	(0)
2013–2015	→ Zenit-2 Saint Petersburg	8	(0)
2014	→ Amkar Perm (loan)	1	(0)
2015–2017	AGF	36	(1)
2017–2018	Dynamo Saint Petersburg	8	(0)
2018	Baltika Kaliningrad	2	(0)
2018	Ural Yekaterinburg	1	(0)
2019	BATE Borisov	2	(0)
2019–2022	Sumgayit	64	(4)
2022–2024	Akron Tolyatti	34	(0)
2024–	Surkhon Termez	40	(0)

International career^{‡}
2012	Russia U16	5	(0)
2012–2013	Russia U17	24	(1)
2014–2015	Russia U19	12	(0)
2014–2016	Russia U21	12	(1)
- * Club domestic league appearances and goals as of 29 July 2026 ‡ National team caps and goals as of 14 November 2016

Dzhamaldin Abdukhalitovich Khodzhaniyazov (Russian: Джамалдин Абдухалитович Ходжаниязов; Turkmen: Jamaldin Abduhalitowiç Hojanyýazow; born 18 July 1996) is a professional football player who plays as a centre-back for Uzbekistani club Surkhon Termez. Born in Turkmenistan, he represented Russia at youth level.

== Biography ==
Khodzhaniyazov was born in the Turkmenistan city of Baýramaly. He is fluent in Russian.

== Club career ==
A graduate of the Tashkent sports school Chilanzar. His first coach was Gregory Rozyev. He also played for the youth club of Akademiya Tolyatti.

In the winter of 2012 he moved to Zenit Saint Petersburg, signing a contract for 3 years. On 26 July 2013 he made his first team debut in a league match against Kuban Krasnodar.

He joined the Danish club AGF on 31 August 2015, with Zenit retaining buy-back rights. His contract got terminated in July 2017.

On 2 December 2017, he returned to Russia, signing a contract with Dynamo Saint Petersburg.

On 16 June 2018, he moved to Baltika Kaliningrad. On 27 July 2018, after just two league games for Baltika, he signed with the Russian Premier League club Ural Yekaterinburg. After playing just two games for Ural (one in the league and another in the Russian Cup), his contract was dissolved by mutual consent on 29 January 2019.

On 11 March 2019, Khodzhaniyazov signed with Belarusian club BATE Borisov. A few months later, in August 2019, he moved to Azerbaijani club Sumgayit.

== International career ==
He began performing for the Russian youth team in 2012. With it he attended the Viktor Bannikov Memorial Tournament where he played four matches. In the tournament the team finished in second place, losing the final in a penalty shootout to Ukraine.

In the junior team of Russia he went to the European U-17 Championship 2013. In the first match, he scored his first goal for Russia. At this tournament, he played all five games, and Russia U-17 team became European champion. He also participated in the 2013 FIFA U-17 World Cup.

Later he represented Russia national under-19 football team at the 2015 UEFA European Under-19 Championship, where Russia came in second place. He is available to represent for either senior Russia or Turkmenistan.

== Career statistics ==
As of 25 May 2024

Club	Season	League			Cup		Continental		Total	
Club	Season	Division	Apps	Goals	Apps	Goals	Apps	Goals	Apps	Goals
Zenit Saint Petersburg	2013–14	Russian Premier League	2	0	0	0	1 (Note: Appearance in the UEFA Champions League)	0	3	0
Zenit Saint Petersburg	2014–15	Russian Premier League	0	0	0	0	1 (Note: Appearances in the UEFA Europa League)	0	1	0
Zenit Saint Petersburg	Total		2	0	0	0	2	0	4	0
Zenit-2 Saint Petersburg	2013–14	Russian Second League	2	0	–		–		2	0
Amkar Perm (loan)	2013–14	Russian Premier League	1	0	–		–		1	0
Zenit-2 Saint Petersburg	2014–15	Russian Second League	5	0	–		–		5	0
Zenit-2 Saint Petersburg	2015–16	Russian First League	1	0	–		–		1	0
Zenit-2 Saint Petersburg	Total		6	0	0	0	0	0	6	0
AGF	2015–16	Danish Superliga	15	0	3	0	–		18	0
AGF	2016–17	Danish Superliga	21	1	3	0	–		24	1
AGF	Total		36	1	6	0	0	0	42	1
Dynamo Saint Petersburg	2017–18	Russian First League	8	0	–		–		8	0
Baltika Kaliningrad	2018–19	Russian First League	2	0	–		–		2	0
Ural Yekaterinburg	2018–19	Russian Premier League	1	0	1	0	–		2	0
BATE Borisov	2019	Belarusian Premier League	2	0	2	0	0	0	4	0
Sumgayit	2019–20	Azerbaijan Premier League	16	0	2	0	–		18	0
Sumgayit	2020–21	Azerbaijan Premier League	23	3	4	0	1	0	28	3
Sumgayit	2021–22	Azerbaijan Premier League	25	1	2	0	2 (Note: Appearances in the UEFA Europa Conference League)	0	29	1
Sumgayit	2022–23	Azerbaijan Premier League	0	0	–		–		0	0
Sumgayit	Total		64	4	8	0	3	0	75	4
Akron Tolyatti	2022–23	Russian First League	25	0	6	0	–		31	0
Akron Tolyatti	2023–24	Russian First League	9	0	2	0	–		11	0
Akron Tolyatti	Total		34	0	8	0	0	0	42	0
Career total			158	5	25	0	5	0	188	5

== Honours ==
=== Club ===
Zenit Saint Petersburg

- Russian Football Premier League: 2014–15

=== International ===
- 2013 UEFA European Under-17 Football Championship winner with Russia.
