= Anton Kryvotsyuk =

Azerbaijani footballer (born 1998)

- Kryvotsyuk in 2026

Personal information
- Full name: Anton Viktorovych Kryvotsyuk
- Date of birth: 20 August 1998 (age 28)
- Place of birth: Kyiv, Ukraine
- Height: 1.86 m (6 ft 1 in)
- Position: Defender

Team information
- Current team: Daejeon Hana Citizen
- Number: 98

Youth career
- 2008–2012: Zirka Kyiv
- 2012–2014: Illichivets Mariupol
- 2014–2015: Zirka Kyiv
- 2015: SC Chaika-2 PB
- 2016–2017: Neftçi

Senior career*
Years	Team	Apps	(Gls)
2017–2021	Neftçi	85	(9)
2021–2023	Wisła Płock	25	(3)
2023–	Daejeon Hana Citizen	113	(6)

International career^{‡}
2015	Azerbaijan U17	4	(0)
2016	Azerbaijan U19	3	(1)
2017–2019	Azerbaijan U21	11	(1)
2019–	Azerbaijan	48	(1)
- * Club domestic league appearances and goals as of 21:47, 13 November 2026 (UTC) ‡ National team caps and goals as of 21:15, 1 October 2026 (UTC)

Anton Viktorovych Kryvotsyuk (Azerbaijani: Anton Viktoroviç Krivotsyuk; Ukrainian: Антон Вікторович Кривоцюк; born 20 August 1998) is a professional footballer who plays as a defender for the South Korean K League 1 club Daejeon Hana Citizen. Born in Ukraine, he plays for the Azerbaijan national team.

== International career ==
Born in Ukraine, Kryvotsyuk's father was stationed in Azerbaijan. Kryvotsyuk holds Azerbaijani and Ukrainian citizenship, and was a youth international for Azerbaijan. He made his international debut for the senior Azerbaijan national team on 25 March 2019, starting in the friendly match against Lithuania, which finished as a 0–0 draw.

== Career statistics ==
=== Club ===
As of match played 27 July 2024

Appearances and goals by club, season and competition
Club	Season	League			National cup (Note: Includes Azerbaijan Cup, Polish Cup, Korean FA Cup)		Continental		Other		Total	
Club	Season	Division	Apps	Goals	Apps	Goals	Apps	Goals	Apps	Goals	Apps	Goals
Neftçi	2016–17	Azerbaijan Premier League	0	0	0	0	—		—		0	0
Neftçi	2017–18	Azerbaijan Premier League	25	0	5	0	—		—		30	0
Neftçi	2018–19	Azerbaijan Premier League	23	3	1	0	2 (Note: Appearances in UEFA Europa League)	0	—		26	3
Neftçi	2019–20	Azerbaijan Premier League	16	4	2	0	6	0	—		24	4
Neftçi	2020–21	Azerbaijan Premier League	21	2	2	0	2	1	—		25	3
Neftçi	Total		85	9	10	0	10	1	—		105	10
Wisła Płock	2021–22	Ekstraklasa	16	2	1	0	—		—		17	2
Wisła Płock	2022–23	Ekstraklasa	9	1	2	0	—		—		11	1
Wisła Płock	Total		25	3	3	0	—		—		28	3
Daejeon Hana Citizen	2023	K League 1	33	1	1	0	—		—		34	1
Daejeon Hana Citizen	2024	K League 1	18	1	1	0	—		—		19	1
Daejeon Hana Citizen	Total		51	2	2	0	—		—		53	2
Career total			161	14	15	0	10	1	0	0	186	15

=== International ===
As of match played 1 October 2026

Appearances and goals by national team and year
National team	Year	Apps	Goals
Azerbaijan
Azerbaijan	2019	7	0
Azerbaijan	2020	6	0
Azerbaijan	2021	11	0
Azerbaijan	2022	3	0
Azerbaijan	2023	9	1
Azerbaijan	2024	4	0
Azerbaijan	2025	5	0
Azerbaijan	2026	3	0
Total		48	1

Scores and results list Azerbaijan's goal tally first, score column indicates score after each Kryvotsyuk goal.

List of international goals scored by Anton Kryvotsyuk
No.	Date	Venue	Opponent	Score	Result	Competition
1	17 June 2023	Dalga Arena, Baku, Azerbaijan	Estonia	1–1	1–1	UEFA Euro 2024 qualifying

== Honours ==
Neftçi

- Azerbaijan Premier League: 2020–21
