= Ragim Sadykhov =

Azerbaijani footballer (born 1996)

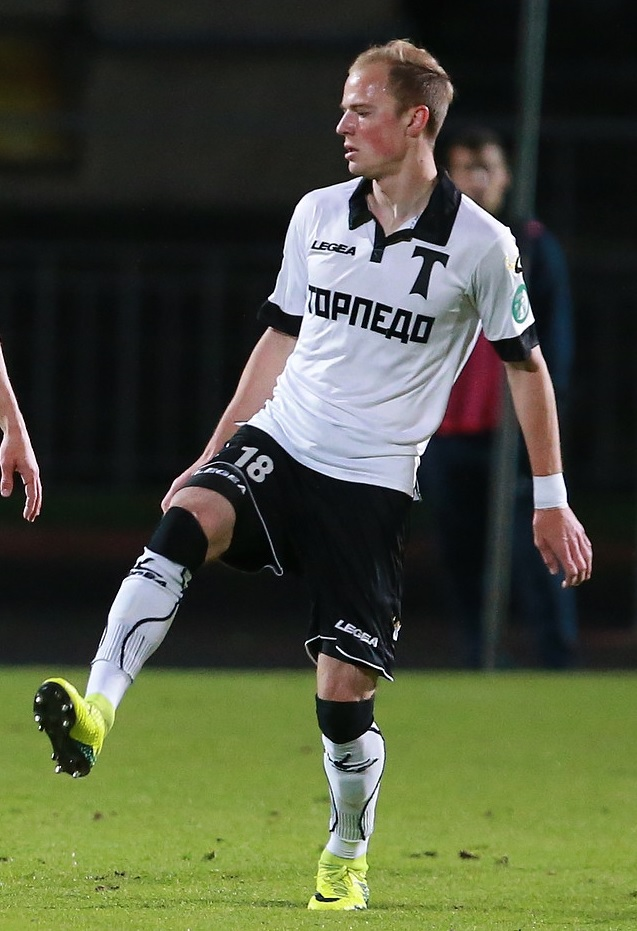
- Sadykhov with Torpedo Moscow in 2017

Personal information
- Full name: Ragim Fuadovich Sadykhov
- Date of birth: 18 July 1996 (age 30)
- Place of birth: Moscow, Russia
- Height: 1.83 m (6 ft 0 in)
- Position: Midfielder

Team information
- Current team: Turan Tovuz
- Number: 17

Youth career
- 2005–2013: Spartak Moscow

Senior career*
Years	Team	Apps	(Gls)
2015–2016	Solyaris Moscow	16	(0)
2016–2019	Torpedo Moscow	71	(23)
2019–2022	Sumgayit	66	(16)
2022–2024	Zira	70	(10)
2024	Sumgayit	16	(1)
2025–	Turan Tovuz	50	(4)

International career^{‡}
2012	Azerbaijan U17	5	(0)
2013	Azerbaijan U19	2	(0)
2020–	Azerbaijan	12	(1)
- * Club domestic league appearances and goals as of 22 June 2026 ‡ National team caps and goals as of 10 June 2026

Ragim Fuadovich Sadykhov (Azerbaijani: Rəhim Fuad oğlu Sadıxov; Russian: Рагим Фуадович Садыхов; born 18 July 1996) is a professional footballer who plays for Turan Tovuz. Born in Russia, he plays for the Azerbaijan national team.

== Club career ==
He made his debut in the Russian Professional Football League for FC Solyaris Moscow on 20 July 2015 in a game against FC Pskov-747 Pskov.

On 12 September 2019, Sadykhov signed a two-year contract with Sumgayit.

On 10 June 2024, Zira announced the departure of Sadykhov after his contract ended.

On 28 June 2024, Sumgayit announced the return of Sadykhov, on a two-year contract with the option of a third.

== International career ==
Sadykhov made his Azerbaijan debut on 8 September 2020 against Cyprus in UEFA Nations League.

== Career statistics ==
=== International ===
As of match played 9 June 2026

Appearances and goals by national team and year
National team	Year	Apps	Goals
Azerbaijan	2020	5	0
Azerbaijan	2021	4	0
Azerbaijan	2022	–	
Azerbaijan	2023	–	
Azerbaijan	2024	–	
Azerbaijan	2025	–	
Azerbaijan	2026	3	1
Total		12	1

Scores and results list Azerbaijan's goal tally first, score column indicates score after each Sadykhov goal.

List of international goals scored by Ragim Sadykhov
No.	Date	Venue	Opponent	Score	Result	Competition
1	27 March 2026	Sumgayit City Stadium, Sumgait, Azerbaijan	Saint Lucia	2–0	6–0	2026 FIFA Series

== Honours ==
=== Individual ===
- Russian Professional Football League Zone Center best player (2018–19).
