= COVID-19 pandemic in Azerbaijan =

Ongoing COVID-19 viral pandemic in Azerbaijan

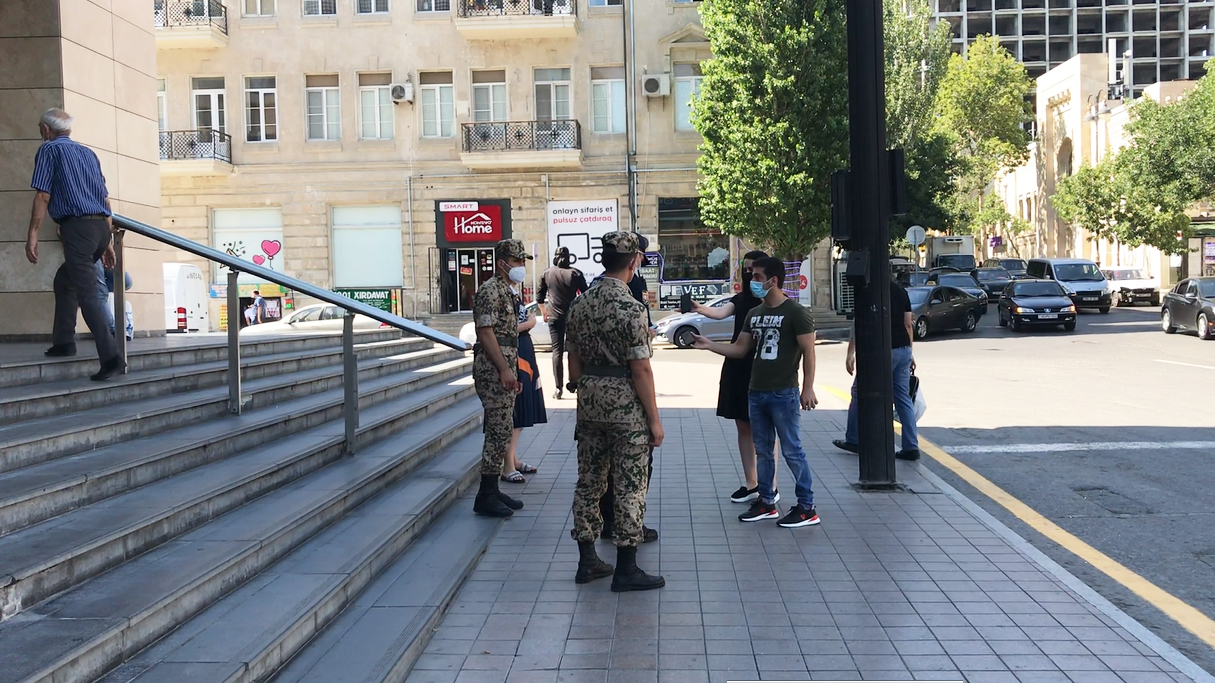
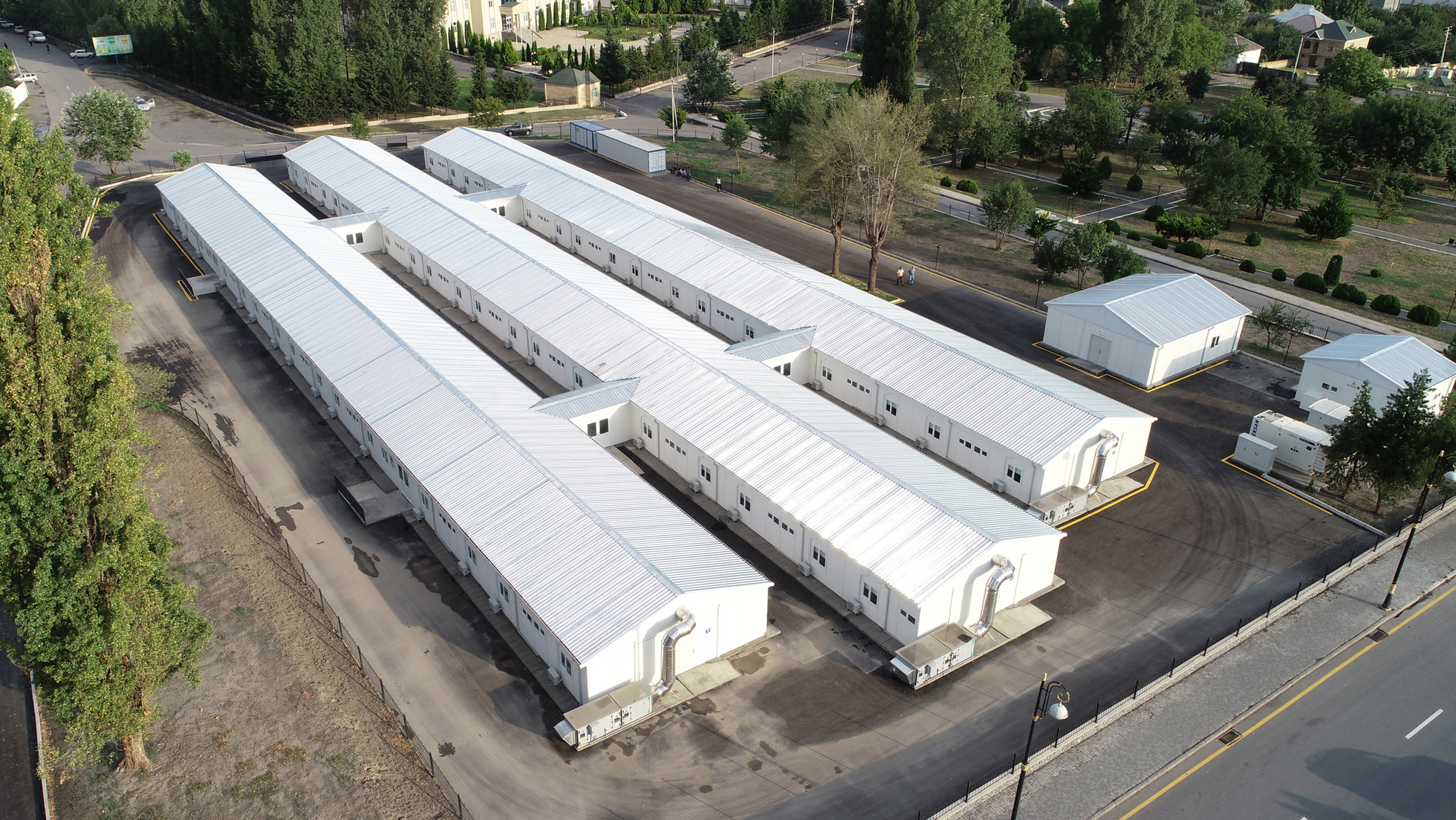
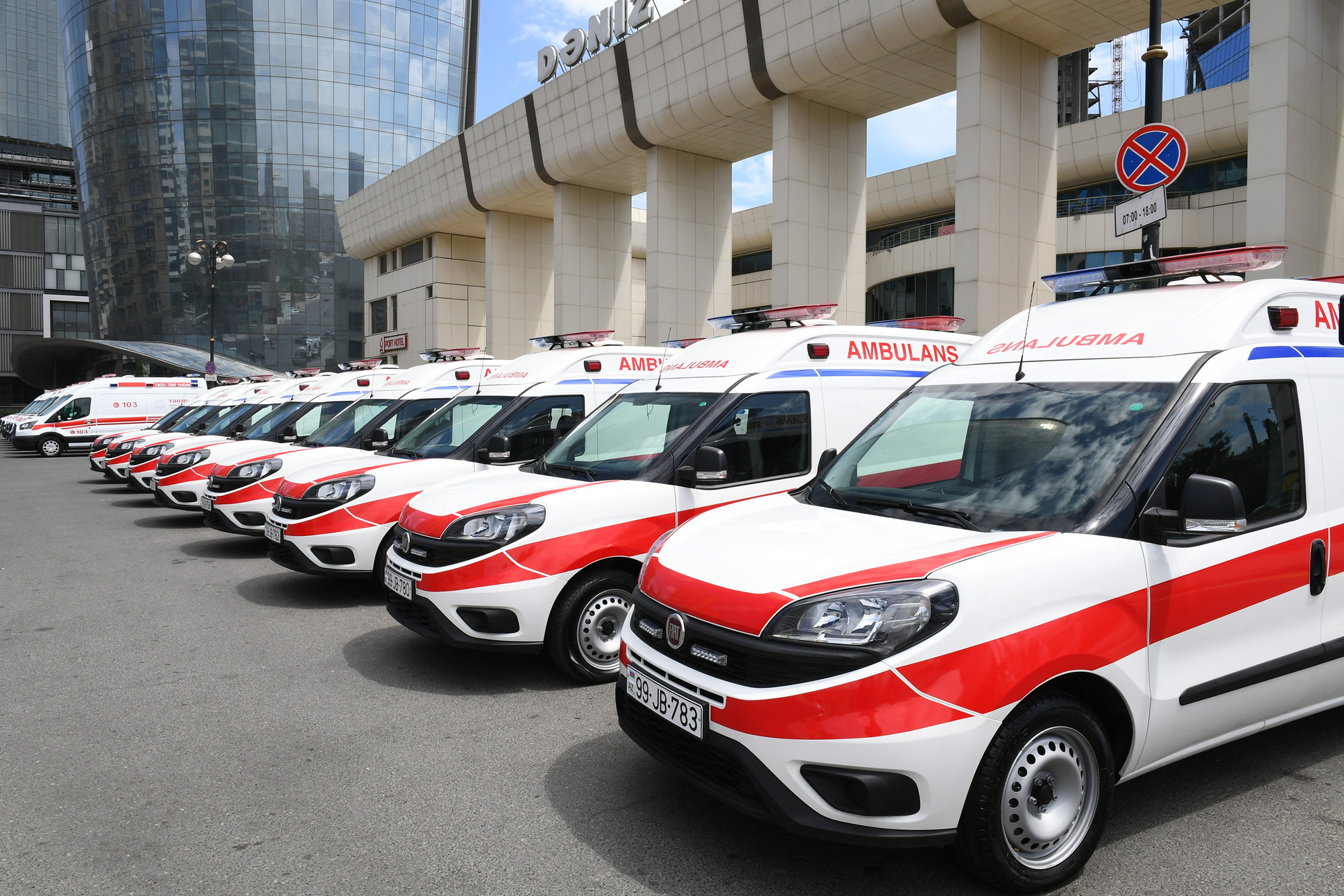
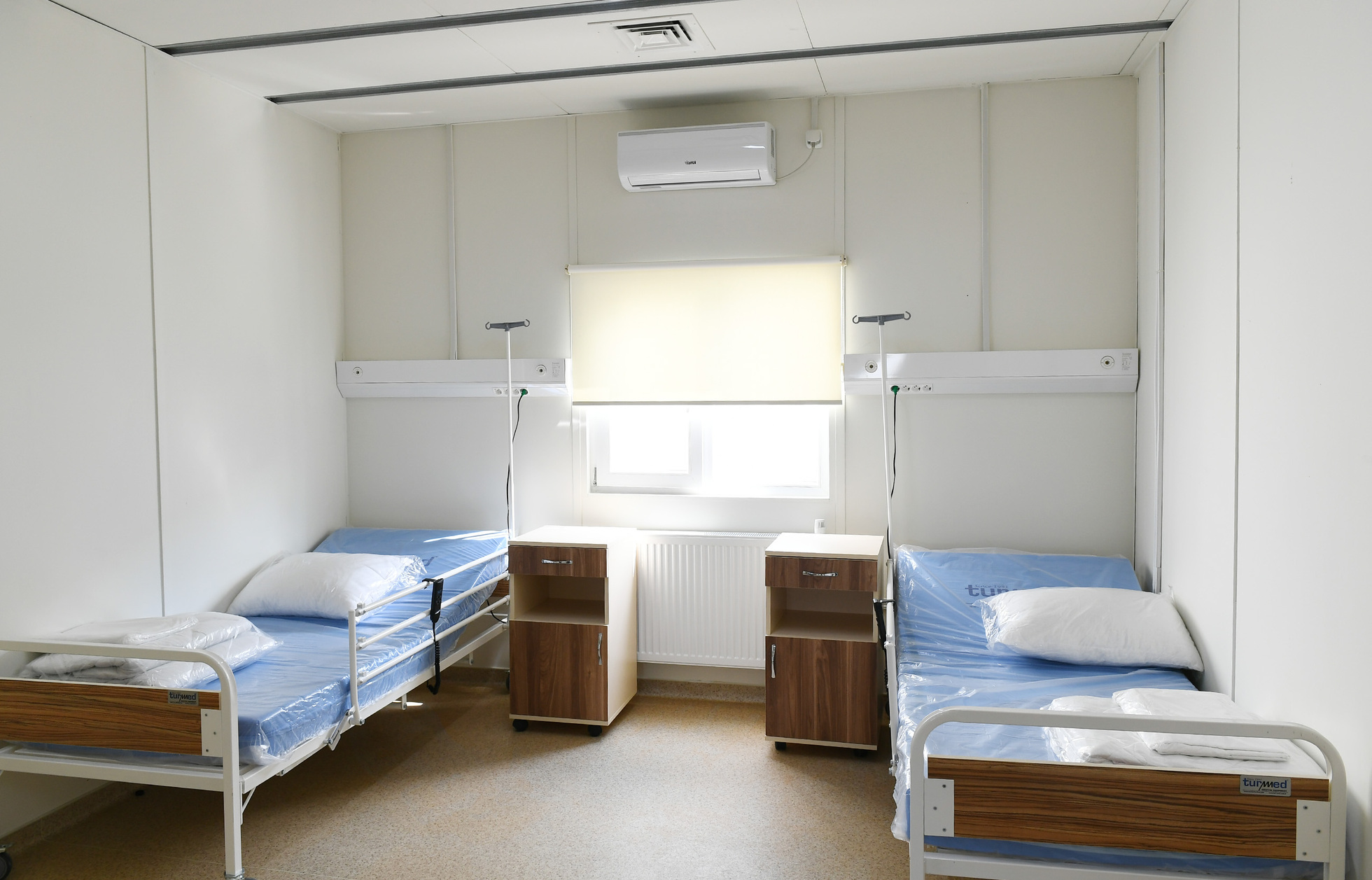
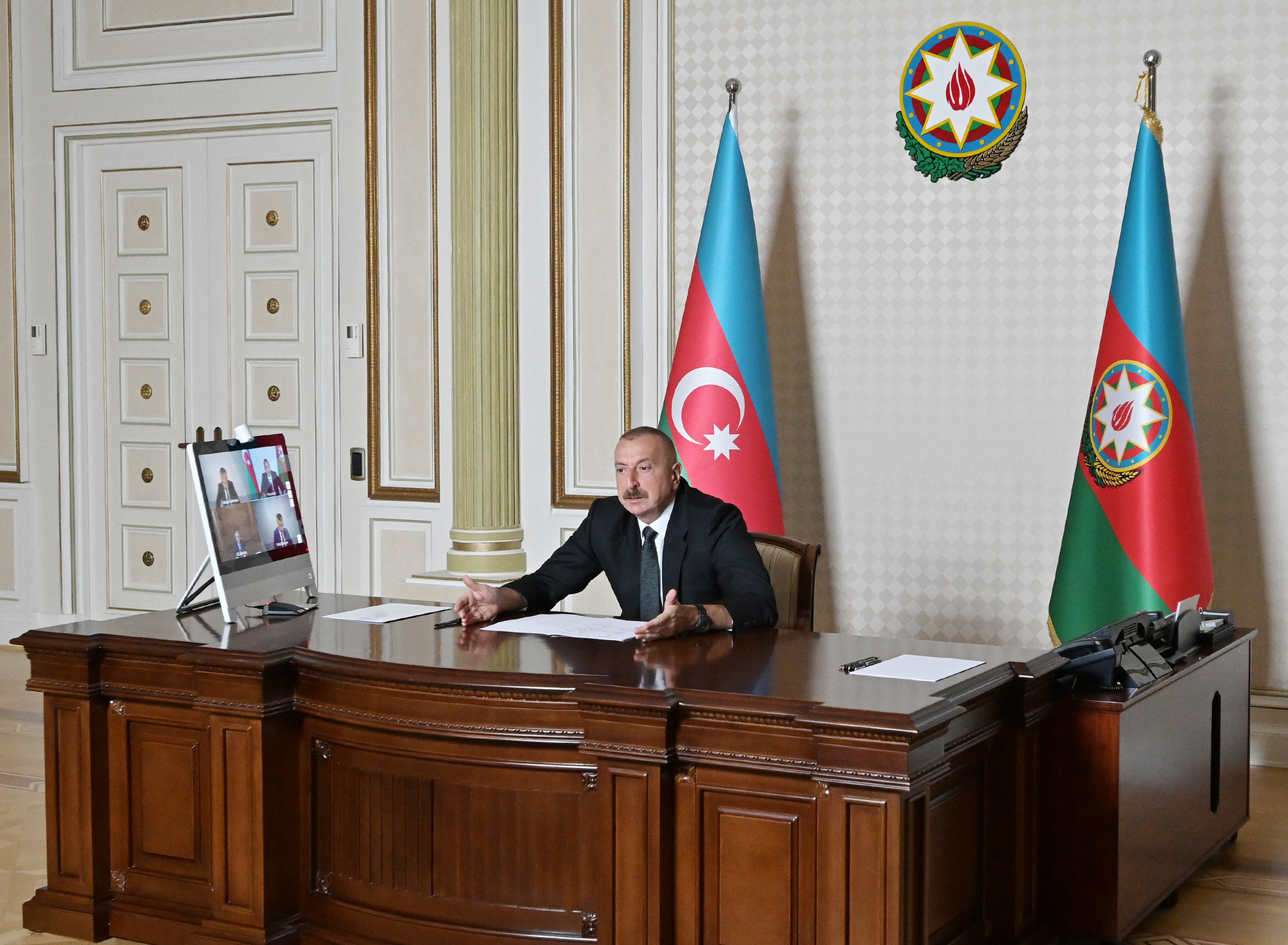
- Top to bottom, left to right: Journalists having an interview with the patrolling servicemen; A modular hospital complex in Gabala; New ambulances in Baku; Beds at a modular hospital complex in Ismayilli; President Ilham Aliyev during a video conference on measures taken to combat the COVID-19 pandemic
- Disease: COVID-19
- Pathogen: SARS-CoV-2
- Location: Azerbaijan
- First outbreak: Wuhan, Hubei, China; Iran
- Index case: Baku
- Arrival date: 28 February 2020 (6 years, 6 months, 2 weeks and 6 days)
- Confirmed cases: 836,510
- Recovered: 208,681
- Deaths: 10,353
- Vaccinations: 5,373,253 (total vaccinated); 4,862,494 (fully vaccinated); 13,857,111 (doses administered)

Government website
- Official information portal Cabinet of Ministers; Ministry of Healthcare; State Agency of Mandatory Health Insurance

The COVID-19 pandemic in Azerbaijan was a part of the worldwide pandemic of coronavirus disease 2019 (COVID-19) caused by severe acute respiratory syndrome coronavirus 2 (SARS-CoV-2). The virus was confirmed to have spread to Azerbaijan when its first case was confirmed in February 2020.

== Background ==
On 12 January 2020, the World Health Organization (WHO) confirmed that a novel coronavirus was the cause of a respiratory illness in a cluster of people in Wuhan City, Hubei Province, China, which was reported to the WHO on 31 December 2019.

The case fatality ratio for COVID-19 has been much lower than SARS of 2003, but the transmission has been significantly greater, with a significant total death toll. Model-based simulations suggest that the 95% confidence interval for the time-varying reproduction number R_{t} was lower than 1.0 in July and August but higher than 1.0 in October and November 2020.

== Timeline ==
=== February 2020 ===
- On 27 February, an operational headquarters under the Cabinet of Ministers was created to prevent danger that the COVID-19 pandemic could cause, to implement prophylactic and urgent measures. This headquarters included heads of related state organisations, leading by Azerbaijan's Prime Minister Ali Asadov.
- On 28 February, the country confirmed its first positive case of COVID-19. The patient, a Russian national, had traveled from Iran. Two more cases were later confirmed in the country and they were all isolated. They were Azerbaijani nationals who returned from Iran. On the same day Azerbaijan closed borders with Iran for 2 weeks.

=== March 2020 ===
- On 2 March, educational processes and other related activities were suspended from 3–9 March in all educational institutions across the country to prevent the spread of COVID-19, to increase the effectiveness of measures taken in this sphere, and to intensify medical prophylactic, disinfection and other preventive measures. The suspension date was later extended through to 27 March.
- On 4 March, Azerbaijan stopped letting trucks and imports coming from Iran to enter the country.
- On 5 March, three more people, arriving from the Islamic Republic of Iran to Azerbaijan, tested positive for COVID-19. One of them was a German citizen born in 1988, and two others were Azerbaijani citizens (1994 and 1999) studying in Iran's Qom. Those people were placed in isolation in a designated hospital. Operative headquarters under the Cabinet of Ministers said total of 276 people who came from Iran are being kept under quarantine on compulsory condition for 14–29 days.
- On 7 March, three Azerbaijani citizens, who returned from the Islamic Republic of Iran, were diagnosed with the coronavirus COVID-19. One of them, born in 1938, some time after returning from Iran, went to the hospital due to a health problem. During the examination, he was diagnosed with pneumonia, and laboratory analysis confirmed the fact of infection with coronavirus. Two others, students born in 1993 and 1994, studying in the Iranian city of Qom, were quarantined while crossing the Iran-Azerbaijan border and they had a coronavirus infection.
- On 9 March, two Azerbaijani citizens (born in 1966 and 1978) who arrived in the country from Iran were infected with the coronavirus COVID-19.
- On 10 March, two Azerbaijani citizens (born in 1960 and 1984) tested positive for coronavirus after returning from Iran, Operational Headquarters under the Cabinet of Ministers reported. Three Azerbaijanis, who previously tested positive for coronavirus (born in 1973, 1997 and 1998) recovered after receiving treatment in special hospitals and have already been discharged.
- On 11 March, two more cases have been confirmed. One of them, born in 1969, tested positive for COVID-19 after admitting to hospital for chronic kidney disease as a complication of SLE. She returned from Iran a while ago. The other one was a student born in 1997, who developed fever after returning from Italy. Both of them put in isolation in special hospital.
- On 12 March, the woman died from multiorgan failure, which diagnosed a day ago with COVID-19. This marked the first death of coronavirus in Azerbaijan.
- On 13 March, four more cases have been confirmed. They returned from Iran and Italy. Azerbaijan closed borders with Georgia for 10 days after phone conversation between Azerbaijan's Prime Minister Ali Asadov with his Georgian counterpart Giorgi Gakharia.
- On 14 March, three Azerbaijanis, who previously tested positive for coronavirus recovered after receiving treatment in special hospitals and have already been discharged. Azerbaijan temporarily closed land and air borders with Turkey mutually after telephone conversation between President of the Republic of Azerbaijan Ilham Aliyev and President of the Republic of Turkey Recep Tayyip Erdogan The Operational Headquarters under the Azerbaijani Cabinet of Ministers conducted the measures on social isolation that applied countrywide from March 14. These measures included banning of wedding, mourning ceremonies and other mass gatherings, closure of cultural facilities, theatres, museums, cinemas, entertainment centres, sport centres and other related facilities, prohibition of patient visits by relatives in all medical establishments, specific guidelines for cafes, restaurants, shops, malls, public transportation, etc.
- On 15 March, four more cases have been confirmed. Later on the day two more cases confirmed.
- On 16 March, mutual visits of Azerbaijani and Russian citizens have been temporarily suspended after telephone conversation took place between Azerbaijan's Prime Minister Ali Asadov and his Russian counterpart Mikhail Mishustin. Azerbaijan National Academy of Sciences reported that work on preparation of vaccines against coronavirus started at Institute of Molecular Biology and Biotechnology.
- On 17 March, as preventive measures on the spread of coronavirus infection (COVID-19), entry to Baku and Sumgayit cities as well as to Absheron region was limited. On the same day it was reported that with 9 more cases, total number of cases rose to 34.
- On 18 March, Operational headquarters reported that four more patients have been discharged form hospitals after recovering.
- On 19 March, Azerbaijan's President Ilham Aliyev signed a decree on March 19 on a number of measures to reduce the negative consequences of coronavirus (COVID-19) pandemic and the impact of volatility caused by this infection in the world energy and stock markets on Azerbaijan's economy, macroeconomic stability, employment and business entities in the country. According to the decree, the Cabinet of Ministers was allocated $1 billion manats from the state budget to finance the measures. Azerbaijani President ordered to establish Support Fund Against Coronavirus. Initially 20 million manats allocated from President's Contingency Fund to this fund to enhance effectiveness of fight against coronavirus. It was later reported that President Ilham Aliyev donated his annual salary to this fund. Later on the day Operational Headquarters under the Cabinet of Ministers reported that ten more people tested positive for coronavirus.
- On 20 March, it was reported that a number of government agencies will get a paid leave from March 29 to April 29. Suspension of educational centers further extended through April 19.
- On 21 March, nine more people tested positive. Azerbaijan strict rules and reduction of working hours were applied to cafes, restaurants, tea houses, internet clubs and other public catering services.
- On 22 March, twelve more cases, including first human to human transmission inside country was confirmed. Shopping centers, malls, and other crowded social and cultural facilities closed for a month.

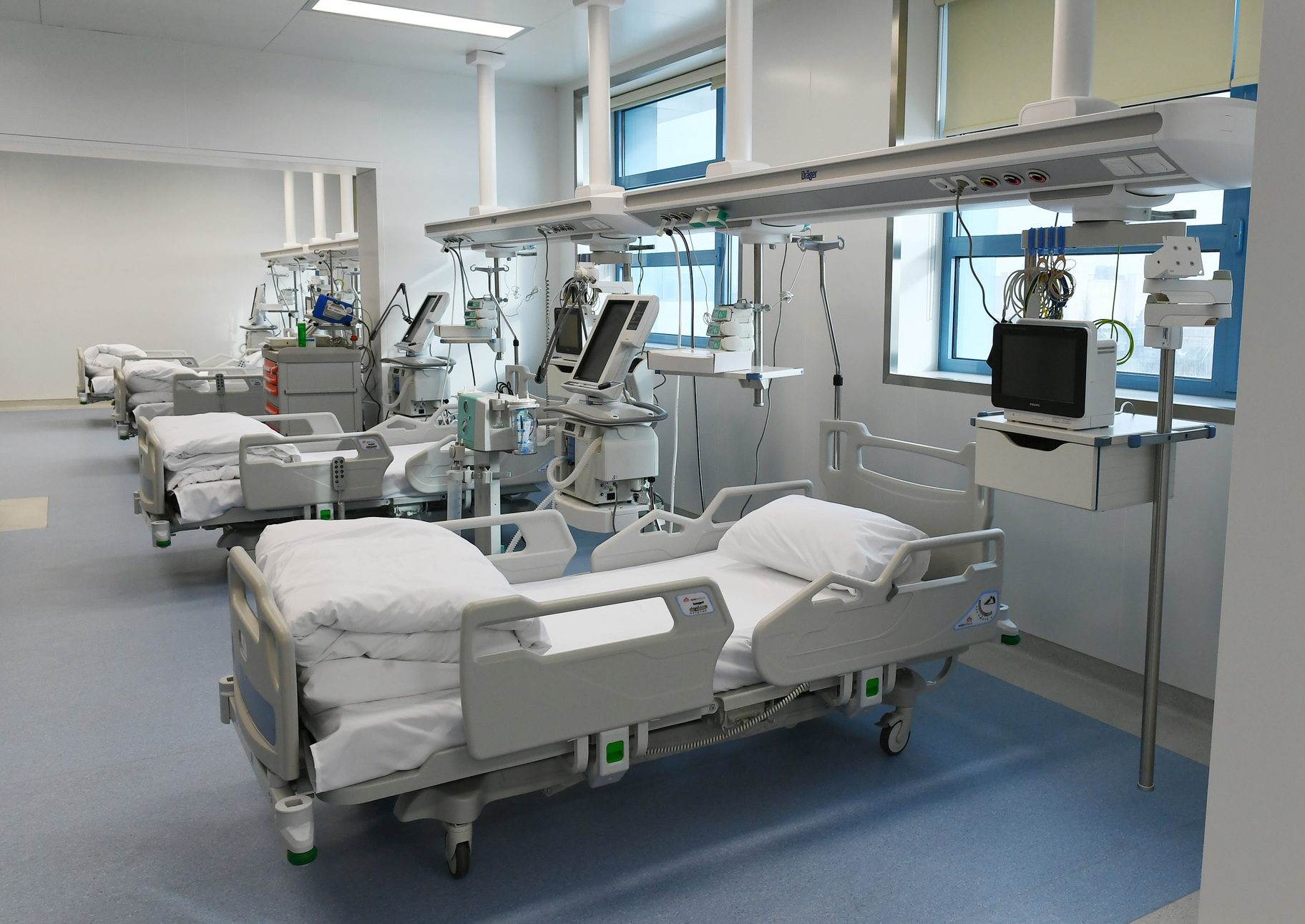
"Yeni klinika" medical institution in Baku opened 28 March 2020 where since the next day COVID-19 infected people with serious symptoms got treatment

- On 31 March, Azerbaijan declared nationwide quarantine. People are required to stay in private houses and apartments, permanent or temporary places of residence until 20 April.

=== April 2020 ===
- On 2 April, it was reported that in order to obtain permission to leave the place of residence, people must get SMS permissions to go outside for vital services (urgent medical need, to purchase food and other goods or medicines). In order to leave the place of residence in the event of a situation that poses a direct threat to life and health, sending an SMS is not required.
- On 24 April, Azerbaijani Government applied a partial easing of quarantine rules starting from 27 April, and allowed re-opening of certain businesses and some previously restricted services. Durations of the permission to go outside for vital services got via SMS extended from 2 hours to 3 hours.
- On 29 April, restrictions on entry and exit at the state border of Azerbaijan excluding freight and charter flights were extended until 31 May 2020.

=== May 2020 ===
- On 1 May, the quarantine regime was prolonged until 31 May 2020. Some of the restriction, such as leaving the house upon SMS notification, registration on the "icaze.e-gov.az" website, visiting parks and recreation areas were lifted in all cities and regions of Azerbaijan except Baku, Sumgayit, Ganja, Lankaran and the Absheron region.
- On 7 May, the first modular hospital complex with 200-bed capacity was inaugurated in Baku.
- On 12 May, a face mask factory and protective coverall plant were opened in Sumgayit.
- On 15 May, special quarantine regime was softened starting from 18 May, therefore, SMS permit and registration on the "icaze.e-gov.az" portal, restrictions on access to parks and recreation areas were dissolved in Baku, Sumgayit, Ganja, Lankaran and the Absheron region as well, on-site customer service in restaurants and cafes was restored, the activities of museums and exhibition halls were also restored, the ban on people aged above 65 leaving their homes was lifted.
- On 29 May, with softening of some restrictions, special quarantine regime in Azerbaijan was extended until 15 June 2020.
- On 29 May, restrictions on entry and exit at the state border of Azerbaijan were extended until 15 June 2020.

=== July 2020 ===
- On 13 July, Azerbaijan Airlines performed a special flight from Havana, Cuba to Baku with 115 medical specialists in order to help doctors counter the spread of the virus.

=== August 2020 ===
- On 4 August, 6 Italian and 10 Chinese medical experts were sent to Baku by ambassadors of both countries in order to share information on COVID-19 and support local hospitals.
- On 25 August, it was reported by Caspian News that USA coronavirus aid to Azerbaijan had reached $5 million.

=== September 2020 ===
- On 8 September, it was reported that Azerbaijan had detected 139 new COVID-19 cases, 128 patients have recovered and one patient has died.
- On 13 September, the number of confirmed COVID cases in Azerbaijan up to over 38,400.

== Government response ==
Some critics of the government have been arrested for allegedly spreading false information about the COVID-19 pandemic.

== Cases in other countries ==
- On 26 February, Georgia confirmed its first COVID-19 case. A 50-year-old man, who returned to Georgia from Iran, was admitted to Infectious Diseases Hospital in Tbilisi. He came back to the Georgian border via Azerbaijan by taxi.
- On 28 February, Belarus confirmed its first case. A student from Iran tested positive on 27 February and was admitted to a hospital in Minsk. The individual arrived in Belarus via a flight from Baku, Azerbaijan, on 22 February.
- On 11 March, Health Ministry of Kuwait confirmed two people to have COVID-19, who came in contact with an infected person whom arrived in Kuwait from Azerbaijan.

== Evacuation of citizens ==
- On 1 February, Turkey's health minister Fahrettin Koca, has said a total of 44 people, including 34 Turkish citizens, 6 Azerbaijanis, 3 Georgians and 1 Albanian have been evacuated from Wuhan.
- On 15 March, charter flights started to launch for the return of Azerbaijan citizens from Turkey since mutual trips of Turkish and Azerbaijani citizens by air and land have been temporarily suspended to prevent the spread of coronavirus. Those returned from Turkey quarantined for 14–28 days.
- On 17 March, Azerbaijan started to launch charter flights from European Union countries, Russia and other countries to evacuate citizens.
- On 20 April, Azerbaijan evacuated 548 Azerbaijani citizens from Russia.

== Impact ==
- On 4 March, first tour of the Baku Road Bicycle Racing Cup (supposed to be held on March 7–8) and Azerbaijani Basketball Championship matches have been cancelled. On 10 March, the traditional festivities related to Novruz holiday in Baku and Azerbaijan's regions in March have been canceled.
- On 13 March, 55th European Karate Championship (supposed to be held on March 25–29) had been cancelled. Also the Azerbaijan Premier League was postponed due to the pandemic. Additionally the finals for the Baku World Cup for artistic gymnastics (scheduled for 14–15 March) was cancelled after qualifications had already taken place.
- On 17 March, UEFA announced that UEFA Euro 2020 (Azerbaijan is one of the host countries) would be delayed by a year due to the COVID-19 pandemic in Europe.
- On 23 March, organisers of the Azerbaijan Grand Prix announced that the race had been postponed, then later cancelled on June 12 due to logistical difficulties associated with establishing a street circuit on short notice.

== Global solidarity ==
Azerbaijan has donated US$5 million to WHO, US$5 million to Iran, medical supplies to Xian City and Mianyang of China, and sent humanitarian aid to Bosnia and Herzegovina to support their fight against the COVID-19 pandemic.

In addition to financial, humanitarian and medical donations to other countries and organizations, Azerbaijan has also shown its solidarity with the nations fighting against the COVID-19 pandemic by illuminating the Heydar Aliyev Center with the colors of the flags of the countries affected by COVID-19. The process started on April 3, 2020, with the Chinese flag and then the flags of France, Germany, Iran, Italy, Russia, Spain, Turkey, the UK, the USA, Georgia, the EU, and the WHO were projected daily onto the building of HAC designed by designer Zaha Hadid.
