= 2018–19 Keşla FK season =

Keşla
2018–19 season
- Manager: Yuriy Maksymov (until 17 July); Mladen Milinković (25 July-29 October); Tarlan Ahmadov (from 30 October)
- Stadium: Inter Arena
- Premier League: 8th
- Azerbaijan Cup: Quarterfinal vs Qarabağ
- Europa League: First Qualifying Round vs Balzan
- Top goalscorer: League: Two Players (5); All: Amil Yunanov (6)
Home colours	Away colours

The Keşla 2018–19 season is Keşla's first full season since the changed their name on 28 October 2017, and the eighteenth Azerbaijan Premier League season.

== Season events ==
On 5 June, Azer Salahli and Fuad Bayramov signed new one-year contracts with Keşla and Slavik Alkhasov signed a new two-year contract.

On 13 June, Keşla signed new one-year contracts with Tarlan Guliyev, Jabir Amirli, Andre Clennon, Murad Gayali, Denis Silva and Adrian Scarlatache, whist Sertan Tashkin signed a new two-year contract.

On 22 June, Keşla agreed new one-year contracts with Orkhan Sadigli, Vagif Javadov and Ebrima Sohna.

On 17 July Yuriy Maksymov left Keşla by mutual consent. On 25 July, Mladen Milinković was appointed as Keşla's new manager.

On 28 July, Keşla signed Elnur Jafarov on a one-year contract.

On 9 August, Keşla signed Nikola Mitrović on a one-year contract.

On 14 August, Keşla announced the signing of Ruslan Nasirli on a one-year contract from MOIK Baku, and Samir Masimov on a two-year contract.

On 17 August, Orkhan Sadigli joined Sumgayit on a season-long loan deal, with Keşla announcing the signing of Edvinas Girdvainis the following day, 18 August.

On 1 October, Keşla announced the signing of Diallo Guidileye on a contract until the end of the season.

On 11 October, Keşla announced the signing of Jonathan Ayité on a contract until the end of the season.

On 29 October 2018 Milinković was sacked as manager, with Tarlan Ahmadov being appointed as his replacement on 30 October 2018.

== Squad ==
As of match played 11 May 2019

No.	Name	Nationality	Position	Date of birth (age)	Signed from	Signed in	Contract ends	Apps.	Goals
Goalkeepers
1	Kamran Aghayev	(Azerbaijan)	GK	9 February 1986 (age 40)	Mladá Boleslav	2018		46	0
16	Shahin Zakiyev	(Azerbaijan)	GK	11 June 1999 (age 27)	Trainee	2015		2	0
30	Davud Karimi	(Azerbaijan)	GK	8 October 1984 (age 42)	Kapaz	2018		10	0
Defenders
2	Sertan Tashkin	(Azerbaijan)	DF	8 October 1997 (age 29)	Trainee	2014	2020	68	4
3	Denis Silva	(Brazil)	DF	28 December 1985 (age 40)	Neftchi Baku	2015	2019	136	6
4	Slavik Alkhasov	(Azerbaijan)	DF	6 February 1993 (age 33)	Sumgayit	2016	2020	77	9
18	Ruslan Amirjanov	(Azerbaijan)	DF	1 February 1985 (age 41)	Sabail	2018	2019	1	0
19	Azer Salahli	(Azerbaijan)	DF	11 April 1994 (age 32)	Sumgayit	2018		20	0
33	Tarlan Guliyev	(Azerbaijan)	DF	19 April 1992 (age 34)	Qarabağ	2016	2019	82	1
65	Jabir Amirli	(Azerbaijan)	DF	6 January 1997 (age 29)		2018		21	1
66	Murad Gayali	(Azerbaijan)	DF	9 March 1999 (age 27)	Trainee	2016	2019	7	0
93	Edvinas Girdvainis	(Lithuania)	DF	17 January 1993 (age 33)	Hapoel Tel Aviv	2018		19	1
Midfielders
8	Seymur Əsədov	(Azerbaijan)	MF	5 May 1994 (age 32)	Sabail	2018		9	0
11	Vusal Isgandarli	(Azerbaijan)	MF	3 November 1995 (age 31)	Zira	2019		13	0
17	Samir Masimov	(Azerbaijan)	MF	25 August 1995 (age 31)		2018	2020	27	2
21	Ángelo Peña	(Venezuela)	MF	25 December 1989 (age 36)	Mineros de Guayana	2019	2019	8	0
22	Nikola Mitrović	(Serbia)	MF	2 January 1987 (age 39)	Wisła Kraków	2018	2019	27	2
24	Fuad Bayramov	(Azerbaijan)	MF	30 November 1994 (age 31)	Trainee	2011	2020	125	4
25	John Kamara	(Sierra Leone)	MF	12 May 1988 (age 38)	Kaisar	2019		13	1
32	Valeriy Kutsenko	(Ukraine)	MF	2 November 1986 (age 40)	Speranța Nisporeni	2019	2019	11	0
90	Orxan Fərəcov	(Azerbaijan)	MF	7 January 2001 (age 25)	Neftchi Baku	2019		1	0
95	Javid Əliyev	(Azerbaijan)	MF	31 May 2001 (age 25)	Academy	2018		1	0
Forwards
7	Vagif Javadov	(Azerbaijan)	ST	25 May 1989 (age 37)		2018	2019	64	20
9	Amil Yunanov	(Azerbaijan)	ST	6 January 1993 (age 33)	Sumgayit	2018	2019	27	6
10	Ruslan Nasirli	(Azerbaijan)	ST	12 January 1995 (age 31)	MOIK Baku	2018	2019	1	0
14	Andre Clennon	(Jamaica)	ST	15 August 1989 (age 37)	VPS	2018	2019	32	5
23	Jonathan Ayité	(Togo)	ST	21 July 1985 (age 41)	Samsunspor	2018	2019	20	5
91	Nurlan Quliyev	(Azerbaijan)	ST	16 February 1998 (age 28)	Gabala	2019		1	0
Away on loan
Left during the season
8	Miloš Bosančić	(Serbia)	MF	22 May 1988 (age 38)	Slovan Liberec	2018		4	0
10	César Meza	(Paraguay)	MF	5 October 1991 (age 35)	Zira	2018		62	9
11	Bahodir Nasimov	(Uzbekistan)	ST	2 May 1987 (age 39)	Buxoro	2018		9	0
15	Orkhan Sadigli	(Azerbaijan)	GK	19 March 1993 (age 33)	Khazar Lankaran	2016	2019	34	0
21	Hervé Tchami	(Cameroon)	MF	20 February 1988 (age 38)	Hajer Club	2018		20	0
27	Adrian Scarlatache	(Romania)	DF	5 December 1986 (age 39)	Astra Giurgiu	2016	2019	62	9
31	Giorgos Georgiadis	(Greece)	MF	14 November 1987 (age 38)	Doxa Drama	2018		8	1
80	Diallo Guidileye	(Mauritania)	MF	30 December 1989 (age 36)	Gençlerbirliği	2018	2019	11	0
88	Mammad Guliyev	(Azerbaijan)	MF	25 August 1995 (age 31)	Ravan Baku	2016		39	4
90	Ebrima Sohna	(The Gambia)	MF	14 December 1988 (age 37)	VPS	2018	2019	24	0
97	Elnur Jafarov	(Azerbaijan)	MF	28 March 1997 (age 29)	Neftçi	2018	2019	3	0

=== Out on loan ===
Note: Flags indicate national team as defined under FIFA eligibility rules; some limited exceptions apply. Players may hold more than one non-FIFA nationality.

No.	Pos.	Nation	Player
—	DF	AZE	Rijat Garayev (at Sabah)

== Transfers ==
=== In ===
Date	Position	Nationality	Name	From	Fee	Ref.
14 June 2018	FW	(Azerbaijan)	Amil Yunanov	Sumgayit	Undisclosed	
14 June 2018	DF	(Azerbaijan)	Azer Salahli	Sumgayit	Undisclosed	
29 June 2018	MF	(Serbia)	Miloš Bosančić	Slovan Liberec	Undisclosed	
28 July 2018	FW	(Azerbaijan)	Elnur Jafarov	Neftçi	Free	
9 August 2018	MF	(Serbia)	Nikola Mitrović	Wisła Kraków	Undisclosed	
14 August 2018	MF	(Azerbaijan)	Samir Masimov		Free	
14 August 2018	FW	(Azerbaijan)	Ruslan Nasirli	MOIK Baku	Undisclosed	
18 August 2018	DF	(Lithuania)	Edvinas Girdvainis	Hapoel Tel Aviv	Undisclosed	
30 August 2018	DF	(Azerbaijan)	Ruslan Amirjanov	Sabail	Free	
1 October 2018	MF	(Mauritania)	Diallo Guidileye	Gençlerbirliği	Undisclosed	
11 October 2018	FW	(Togo)	Jonathan Ayité	Samsunspor	Undisclosed	
	MF	(Greece)	Giorgos Georgiadis	Doxa Drama	Undisclosed	
	FW	(Uzbekistan)	Bahodir Nasimov	FK Buxoro	Undisclosed	
8 January 2019	MF	(Azerbaijan)	Vusal Isgandarli	Zira	Undisclosed	
8 January 2019	MF	(Sierra Leone)	John Kamara	Kaisar	Undisclosed	
8 February 2019	MF	(Venezuela)	Ángelo Peña	Mineros de Guayana	Undisclosed	
8 February 2019	MF	(Ukraine)	Valeriy Kutsenko	Speranța Nisporeni	Undisclosed	

=== Out ===
Date	Position	Nationality	Name	From	Fee	Ref.
6 August 2018	MF	(Paraguay)	César Meza	Universitatea Craiova	Undisclosed	

=== Loans out ===
Date from	Position	Nationality	Name	To	Date to	Ref.
17 August 2018	GK	(Azerbaijan)	Orkhan Sadigli	Sumgayit	8 January 2019	

=== Released ===
Date	Position	Nationality	Name	Joined	Date
4 September 2018	DF	(Romania)	Adrian Scarlatache	Zira	4 September 2018
18 September 2018	MF	(Serbia)	Miloš Bosančić	Sabah	
	DF	(Azerbaijan)	Magsad Isayev	Sabah	
	MF	(Azerbaijan)	Mirsahib Abbasov	Zira	
	MF	(Azerbaijan)	Agshin Guluzade	Zira	
	FW	(Azerbaijan)	Alibey Mammadli	Sabah	4 August 2018
	FW	(Azerbaijan)	Gara Garayev	Shuvalan	
	FW	(Azerbaijan)	Pardis Fardjad-Azad	Zira	23 July 2018
21 December 2018	MF	(Cameroon)	Hervé Tchami		
21 December 2018	MF	(The Gambia)	Ebrima Sohna		
21 December 2018	MF	(Greece)	Giorgos Georgiadis	Elazığspor	
21 December 2018	FW	(Uzbekistan)	Bahodir Nasimov	Navbahor Namangan	
28 December 2018	MF	(Azerbaijan)	Mammad Guliyev		
28 December 2018	MF	(Azerbaijan)	Elnur Jafarov		
8 January 2019	GK	(Azerbaijan)	Orkhan Sadigli	Zira	
	MF	(Mauritania)	Diallo Guidileye	Elazığspor	
16 May 2019	GK	(Azerbaijan)	Kamran Agayev		
16 May 2019	GK	(Azerbaijan)	Davud Karimi		
16 May 2019	DF	(Brazil)	Denis Silva		
16 May 2019	DF	(Lithuania)	Edvinas Girdvainis	Rīgas FS	
16 May 2019	MF	(Azerbaijan)	Seymur Əsədov		
16 May 2019	MF	(Azerbaijan)	Fuad Bayramov	Rustavi	
16 May 2019	MF	(Serbia)	Nikola Mitrović	Zalaegerszegi	3 July 2019
16 May 2019	MF	(Ukraine)	Valeriy Kutsenko	Avanhard Kramatorsk	
16 May 2019	MF	(Venezuela)	Ángelo Peña	Deportivo La Guaira	
16 May 2019	FW	(Azerbaijan)	Ruslan Nasirli		
16 May 2019	FW	(Azerbaijan)	Amil Yunanov	Sumgayit	4 June 2019
16 May 2019	FW	(Jamaica)	Andre Clennon	Humble Lions	
16 May 2019	FW	(Togo)	Jonathan Ayité	Olympiakos	20 August 2019

== Friendlies ==
30 June 2018 Friendly	Keşla (Azerbaijan)	0 – 2	(Bosnia and Herzegovina) Čelik Zenica	Bolu, Turkey
17:00 AZT (UTC+4)		Report

3 July 2018 Friendly	Keşla (Azerbaijan)	2 – 3	(Estonia) Levadia Tallinn	Bolu, Turkey
AZT (UTC+4)	Denis; A.Salahli	Report

6 July 2018 Friendly	Keşla (Azerbaijan)	0 – 2	(Iran) Tractor Sazi	Bolu, Turkey
AZT (UTC+4)		Report

18 January 2019	Keşla (Azerbaijan)	0 – 0	Uzbekistan U23	Antalya, Turkey
AZST (UTC+4)		Report

20 January 2019	Keşla (Azerbaijan)	0 – 2	(Serbia) Dinamo Vranje	Antalya, Turkey
AZST (UTC+4)		Report	Goal

25 January 2019	Keşla (Azerbaijan)	1 – 0	(Russia) Chertanovo Moscow	Antalya, Turkey
AZST (UTC+4)	Ayité 62'	Report

== Competitions ==
=== Premier League ===
==== Results summary ====
Overall								Home						Away					
Pld	W	D	L	GF	GA	GD	Pts	W	D	L	GF	GA	GD	W	D	L	GF	GA	GD
28	6	5	17	29	44	−15	23	3	1	10	12	20	−8	3	4	7	17	24	−7

Last updated: 11 May 2019.
Source: See Results

==== Results ====
12 August 2018 1	Keşla	0 – 1	Sabah	Baku
21:00 AZT (UTC+4)	Scarlatache (yellow card) 39'; S.Tashkin (yellow card) 64'	Report	Dević 45+2' (pen.); Stamenković (yellow card) 81'	Stadium: ASK Arena; Attendance: 300; Referee: Rahim Həsənov

18 August 2018 2	Zira	2 – 2	Keşla	Baku
20:30 AZT (UTC+4)	M.Abbasov 2'; Fardjad-Azad (yellow card) 15' (goal) 35'; I.Muradov (yellow card) 55'; Nazirov (yellow card) 89'; Mustafayev (yellow card) 90'	Report	S.Alkhasov 53'; Clennon 90+1'	Stadium: AZAL Arena; Attendance: 400; Referee: Ingilab Məmmədov

26 August 2018 3	Keşla	1 – 2	Sabail	Baku
18:00 AZT (UTC+4)	Clennon (yellow card) 35'; Sohna (yellow card) 47'; Masimov (yellow card) 49'; Mitrović 75' (pen.)	Report	Koubemba 31', 50'; Kitanovski (yellow card) 87'	Stadium: ASK Arena; Attendance: 1,000; Referee: Rahim Həsənov

16 September 2018 4	Neftchi Baku	2 – 0	Keşla	Baku
21:00 AZT (UTC+4)	A.Krivotsyuk (yellow card) 69' (goal) 88'; Dabo 90+3'	Report	Guliyev (yellow card) 25'; Sohna (yellow card) 58'; Aghayev (yellow card) 88'	Stadium: Bakcell Arena; Attendance: 1,300; Referee: Ramil Diniyev

23 September 2018 5	Keşla	1 – 2	Sumgayit	Baku
18:30 AZT (UTC+4)	Sohna (yellow card) 41'; S.Alkhasov 44'; Clennon (yellow card) 51' (yellow-red card) 90+2'; Mitrović (yellow card) 68'; Denis (yellow card) 80'	Report	Babayev (yellow card) 41'; Taghiyev 47'; Ismayilov 67'; B.Hasanalizade (yellow card) 80'; S.Ahmadov (yellow card) 81'	Stadium: ASK Arena; Attendance: 400; Referee: Orkhan Məmmədov

30 September 2018 6	Gabala	1 – 1	Keşla	Qabala
18:00 AZT (UTC+4)	Stanković (yellow card) 7'; Ramaldanov (yellow card) 35'; Joseph-Monrose 75'	Report	Girdvainis (yellow card) 3'; Yunanov 5'; Mitrović (yellow card) 78'; Aghayev (yellow card) 90+2'	Stadium: Gabala City Stadium; Attendance: 500; Referee: Ravan Həmzəzadə

21 October 2018 8	Keşla	1 – 0	Zira	Baku
19:00 AZT (UTC+4)	Naghiyev 2' (o.g.); Yunanov (yellow card) 31'; Guidileye (yellow card) 68'	Report	K.Mirzayev (yellow card) 33'; S.Guliyev (yellow card) 65'; Naghiyev (yellow card) 89'; Hamdi (yellow card) 90+4'	Stadium: ASK Arena; Attendance: 500; Referee: Aliyar Ağayev

28 October 2018 9	Sabail	2 – 1	Keşla	Baku
15:00 AZT (UTC+4)	Ramazanov (yellow card) 2'; Cociuc (yellow card) 10' (yellow-red card) 49' (goal) 24' (pen.); F.Muradbayli 29'; Korotetskyi (yellow card) 32'	Report	S.Alkhasov (yellow card) 25'; Masimov (yellow card) 43'; Denis 90+2'	Stadium: Bayil Arena; Attendance: 450; Referee: Ingilab Məmmədov

31 October 2018 7	Keşla	1 – 1	Qarabağ	Baku
19 AZT (UTC+4)	Ayité (yellow card) 30'; S.Tashkin 78'; Masimov (yellow card) 87' (yellow-red card) 88'; Yunanov (yellow card) 90+1'	Report	Sadygov (yellow card) 34'; Míchel 56'; Madatov (yellow card) 75'; Rzeźniczak (yellow card) 90+1'	Stadium: ASK Arena; Attendance: 1,000; Referee: Rahim Həsənov
Note: Match original scheduled for 6 October, but moved to 31 October to assist the Azerbaijan national football team.

3 November 2018 10	Keşla	0 – 1	Neftchi Baku	Baku
17:00 AZT (UTC+4)	Guidileye (yellow card) 22'; S.Tashkin (yellow card) 47'	Report	M.Abbasov 2'; Bralić (yellow card) 67'; Aghayev (yellow card) 90+4'	Stadium: ASK Arena; Attendance: 1,500; Referee: Rauf Jabbarov

11 November 2018 11	Sumgayit	1 – 4	Keşla	Baku
19:30 AZT (UTC+4)	E.Babayev (yellow card) 20'; Yildirim 65'; O.Sadigli (red card) 67'; S.Aliyev (yellow card) 90+5'	Report	S.Alkhasov (yellow card) 22'; Yunanov 53', 79'; Georgiadis 56' (yellow card) 66'; S.Tashkin (yellow card) 64'; Jannatov 90+3' (o.g.)	Stadium: Bayil Arena; Attendance: 250; Referee: Aliyar Ağayev

24 November 2018 12	Keşla	1 – 2	Gabala	Baku
16:30 AZT (UTC+4)	Yunanov 38'; S.Tashkin (yellow card) 90'; Guidileye (yellow card) 90+4'	Report	Khalilzade (yellow card) 11'; Adeniyi 17' (yellow card) 67'; Stanković 20'; Lilaj (yellow card) 33'; Abbasov (yellow card) 36'; Joseph-Monrose (yellow card) 48'	Stadium: ASK Arena; Attendance: 500; Referee: Ravan Həmzəzadə

3 December 2018 13	Qarabağ	5 – 1	Keşla	Baku
19:00 AZT (UTC+4)	Madatov 6', 53', 77'; Ozobić 50'; Zoubir 55'	Report	D.Karimi (yellow card) 16'; S.Alkhasov 21' (yellow card) 85'; T.Guliyev (yellow card) 26'; Mitrović (yellow card) 58'; Javadov (yellow card) 83'	Stadium: Tofiq Bahramov Republican Stadium; Attendance: 500; Referee: Alik Yunusov

9 December 2018 14	Sabah	1 – 2	Keşla	Masazır
16:00 AZT (UTC+4)	N.Mammadov (yellow card) 38'; M.Isayev (yellow card) 57'; E.Nabiyev (yellow card) 64'; E.Abdullayev 81'; Ramos (yellow card) 89'	Report	S.Tashkin 34'; Denis (yellow card) 40' (goal) 65'; Mitrović (yellow card) 57'; S.Alkhasov (yellow card) 72'; Aghayev (yellow card) 79'; Yunanov (yellow card) 82'	Stadium: Alinja Arena; Attendance: 300; Referee: Orkhan Məmmədov

2 February 2019 15	Keşla	0 – 3	Sabail	Baku
19:00 AZT (UTC+4)	Isgandarli (yellow card) 65'; J.Amirli (yellow card) 78'; Ayité (yellow card) 90+3'	Report	Koubemba 14'; Yunuszade 53'; Ramazanov 60'	Stadium: ASK Arena; Attendance: 450; Referee: Rahim Həsənov

10 February 2019 16	Neftchi Baku	2 – 0	Keşla	Baku
14:00 AZT (UTC+4)	Mahmudov 35', 68' (pen.); Buludov (yellow card) 78'	Report	Denis (yellow card) 7'; Kamara (yellow card) 33'; Isgandarli (yellow card) 37'; A.Salahli (yellow card) 66'; Guliyev (yellow card) 67'	Stadium: Bakcell Arena; Attendance: 1,000; Referee: Ingilab Məmmədov

16 February 2019 17	Keşla	2 – 1	Sumgayit	Baku
15:00 AZT (UTC+4)	Yunanov 28'; A.Salahli (yellow card) 38'; Mitrović (yellow card) 50' (goal) 90+1' (pen.); Ayité (yellow card) 90+1'	Report	Agayev (yellow card) 22'; Ismayilov 72'	Stadium: ASK Arena; Attendance: 500; Referee: Rauf Jabbarov

23 February 2019 18	Gabala	0 – 0	Keşla	Qabala
14:00 AZST (UTC+4)	Abbasov (yellow card) 73'; A.Seydiyev (yellow card) 90+3'	Report	Peña (yellow card) 29'; Isgandarli (yellow card) 82'; Denis (yellow card) 90'	Stadium: Gabala City Stadium; Attendance: 650; Referee: Rəşad Ahmədov

3 March 2019 19	Keşla	0 – 1	Qarabağ	Baku
17:30 AZT (UTC+4)	Yunanov (yellow card) 39'; Kamara (yellow card) 47'	Report	Abdullayev 16'	Stadium: ASK Arena; Attendance: 900; Referee: Orkhan Məmmədov

9 March 2019 20	Keşla	3 – 0	Sabah	Baku
16:00 AZT (UTC+4)	Ayité 27', 47'; J.Amirli 67'; N.Quliyev (yellow card) 90+2'	Report	M.İsayev (yellow card) 55'; Imamverdiyev (yellow card) 61'	Stadium: ASK Arena; Attendance: 250; Referee: Rahim Həsənov

15 March 2019 21	Zira	2 – 0	Keşla	Zirə
16:00 AZT (UTC+4)	Dedov (yellow card) 44'; Tounkara (yellow card) 53'; J.Amirli 69' (o.g.); Rodríguez (yellow card) 76' (goal) 79'; Duventru (yellow card) 84'	Report	S.Alkhasov (yellow card) 61'	Stadium: Zira Olympic Sport Complex Stadium; Attendance: 400; Referee: Rəvan Həmzəzadə

30 March 2019 22	Keşla	0 – 1	Neftchi Baku	Baku
18:30 AZT (UTC+4)	Kamara (yellow card) 39'	Report	Mahmudov (yellow card) 73' (goal) 79' (pen.)	Stadium: ASK Arena; Attendance: 1,500; Referee: Aliyar Ağayev

6 April 2019 23	Sumgayit	2 – 1	Keşla	Sumqayit
16:00 AZT (UTC+4)	Babaei 4'; K.Najafov (yellow card) 43'; Taghiyev 85'; S.Aliyev (yellow card) 86'	Report	Masimov 41'; Isgandarli (yellow card) 90'; Mitrović (yellow card) 90+5'	Stadium: Kapital Bank Arena; Attendance: 1,000; Referee: Orkhan Məmmədov

14 April 2019 24	Keşla	1 – 2	Gabala	Baku
15:00 AZST (UTC+4)	S.Alkhasov (yellow card) 55'; Kamara 76'; Ayité (yellow card) 79'	Report	Adeniyi 46' (yellow card) 60'; Volkovi 65'; Bezotosnyi (yellow card) 77'; Aliyev (yellow card) 84'	Stadium: ASK Arena; Attendance: 1,700; Referee: Vugar Həsənli

18 April 2019 24	Qarabağ	3 – 0	Keşla	Baku
19:00 AZT (UTC+4)	Slavchev 18'; Quintana (yellow card) 29'; Richard 59' (pen.); Zoubir 75'	Report	Kamara (yellow card) 13'; Kutsenko (yellow card) 67'	Stadium: Tofiq Bahramov Republican Stadium; Attendance: 500; Referee: Aliyar Ağayev

27 April 2019 26	Sabah	1 – 1	Keşla	Masazır
17:00 AZT (UTC+4)	Ramos (yellow card) 31'; Dević 59' (pen.); Bezruk (yellow card) 90+2'; K.Diniyev (yellow card) 90+4'	Report	A.Salahli (yellow card) 24'; Mitrović (yellow card) 25'; S.Əsədov (yellow card) 32'; Guliyev (yellow card) 56'; Ayité 90+4' (yellow card) 90+4'	Stadium: Alinja Arena; Attendance: 500; Referee: Ingilab Məmmədov

5 May 2019 27	Keşla	1 – 3	Zira	Baku
17:00 AZT (UTC+4)	Girdvainis (yellow card) 13'; Denis (red card) 28'; Ayité 45+1' (pen.); Mitrović (yellow card) 56'; Clennon (yellow card) 80'	Report	Kgaswane (yellow card) 9' (goal) 52'; Hamdi (yellow card) 16'; Rodríguez 26', 47'	Stadium: ASK Arena; Attendance: 200; Referee: Ingilab Məmmədov

11 May 2019 28	Sabail	1 – 4	Keşla	Baku
15:00 AZT (UTC+4)	Ramazanov (yellow card) 22'; Akpoveta (yellow card) 51' (goal) 54'; Rahimov (yellow card) 70'; V.Beybalayev (yellow card) 80'	Report	Clennon 7'; Girdvainis (yellow card) 22' (yellow-red card) 51' (goal) 38'; Masimov 45'; Ayité 72'; S.Tashkin (yellow card) 76'	Stadium: Bayil Arena; Attendance: 500; Referee: Sabuhi Bayramov

==== League table ====
Pos	Team	Pld	W	D	L	GF	GA	GD	Pts	Qualification or relegation
4	Gabala	28	9	9	10	31	33	−2	36	Qualification for the Europa League second qualifying round
5	Zira	28	8	7	13	30	40	−10	31	
6	Sumgayit	28	8	5	15	24	42	−18	29	
7	Sabah	28	7	6	15	20	41	−21	27	
8	Keşla	28	6	5	17	29	45	−16	23	

Source: Soccerway
Rules for classification: 1) Points; 2) Head-to-head points; 3) Head-to-head goal difference; 4) Head-to-head goals scored; 5) Head-to-head away goals scored (only if two teams); 6) Goal difference; 7) Goals scored.

=== Azerbaijan Cup ===
6 December 2018 Second Round	Shuvalan	0 – 3	Keşla	Baku
17:00 AZT (UTC+4)	N.Məmmədov (yellow card) 49'; K.Mirzəliyev (yellow card) 75'; A.Ismayilov (yellow card) 86'	Report	A.Alakbərli 47' (pen.); Javadov 50' (pen.); Guidileye (yellow card) 79'; Clennon 85'	Stadium: AZAL Arena; Attendance: 200; Referee: Orkhan Mammadov

16 December 2018 Quarterfinal 1st leg	Qarabağ	1 – 0	Keşla	Baku
19:00 AZT (UTC+4)	Quintana (yellow card) 43'; Mammadov 65'	Report	Ayité (yellow card) 33'; Guliyev (yellow card) 90+4'; S.Tashkin (yellow card) 90+4'	Stadium: Tofiq Bahramov Republican Stadium; Attendance: 400; Referee: Vugar Həsənli

20 December 2018 Quarterfinal 2nd leg	Keşla	1 – 1 (1 – 2 agg.)	Qarabağ	Baku
19:00 AZT (UTC+4)	Yunanov 29'; S.Alkhasov (yellow card) 55'; S.Əsədov (yellow card) 71'	Report	Madatov (yellow card) 22'; Sadygov (yellow card) 36'; Agolli (yellow card) 36'; Míchel 48' (yellow card) 72'; Rzeźniczak (yellow card) 53' (yellow-red card) 89'; Medvedev (yellow card) 62'; Ozobić (yellow card) 78'	Stadium: ASK Arena; Attendance: 600; Referee: Ingilab Mammadov

=== UEFA Europa League ===
==== Qualifying rounds ====
12 July 2017 First qualifying round 1st leg	Balzan (Malta)	4 – 1	(Azerbaijan) Keşla	Ta' Qali, Malta
22:00 AZT (UTC+4)	Effiong 12'; Lecão 21'; Kaljević 34'; Cadú 55' (yellow card) 71'; Lepović (yellow card) 58'	Report	Meza 29' (pen.); F.Bayramov (yellow card) 38'; Sohna (yellow card) 88'	Stadium: National Stadium; Attendance: 504; Referee: Volen Chinkov (Bulgaria)

19 July 2017 First qualifying round 2nd leg	Keşla (Azerbaijan)	2 – 1 (3 – 5 agg.)	(Malta) Balzan	Baku, Azerbaijan
21:00 AZT (UTC+4)	Meza 11' (pen.) (yellow card) 32'; Scarlatache (yellow card) 37'; S.Alkhasov 90+1'	Report	Serrano (yellow card) 32'; Šljivić (yellow card) 62'; S.Sultana (yellow card) 82'; Majdevac (yellow card) 90+5' (yellow-red card) 90+7' (goal) 90+6'	Stadium: Dalga Arena; Referee: Mikhail Vilkov (Russia)
Note: Keşla played their home matches at Dalga Arena, Baku, instead of their regular stadium Inter Arena, Baku

== Squad statistics ==
As of Match played 11 May 2019

=== Appearances and goals ===
No.	Pos	Nat	Player	Total		Premier League		Azerbaijan Cup		Europa League	
No.	Pos	Nat	Player	Apps	Goals	Apps	Goals	Apps	Goals	Apps	Goals
1	GK	(Azerbaijan) AZE	Kamran Aghayev	23	0	19	0	2	0	2	0
2	DF	(Azerbaijan) AZE	Sertan Tashkin	19	2	13+1	2	3	0	2	0
3	DF	(Brazil) BRA	Denis Silva	30	2	26	2	2	0	2	0
4	DF	(Azerbaijan) AZE	Slavik Alkhasov	31	4	27	3	2	0	2	1
7	FW	(Azerbaijan) AZE	Vagif Javadov	12	1	4+6	0	1	1	1	0
8	MF	(Azerbaijan) AZE	Seymur Əsədov	9	0	6	0	3	0	0	0
9	FW	(Azerbaijan) AZE	Amil Yunanov	27	6	13+11	5	1+1	1	0+1	0
10	FW	(Azerbaijan) AZE	Ruslan Nasirli	2	0	1	0	0+1	0	0	0
11	MF	(Azerbaijan) AZE	Vusal Isgandarli	13	0	13	0	0	0	0	0
14	FW	(Jamaica) JAM	Andre Clennon	20	3	9+6	2	0+3	1	2	0
16	GK	(Azerbaijan) AZE	Shahin Zakiyev	2	0	2	0	0	0	0	0
17	MF	(Azerbaijan) AZE	Samir Masimov	27	2	13+11	2	3	0	0	0
18	DF	(Azerbaijan) AZE	Ruslan Amirjanov	1	0	0+1	0	0	0	0	0
19	DF	(Azerbaijan) AZE	Azer Salahli	20	0	17+2	0	0	0	1	0
21	MF	(Venezuela) VEN	Ángelo Peña	8	0	6+2	0	0	0	0	0
22	MF	(Serbia) SRB	Nikola Mitrović	27	2	25	2	2	0	0	0
23	FW	(Togo) TOG	Jonathan Ayité	19	5	11+6	5	1+1	0	0	0
24	MF	(Azerbaijan) AZE	Fuad Bayramov	1	0	0	0	0	0	1	0
25	MF	(Sierra Leone) SLE	John Kamara	13	1	13	1	0	0	0	0
30	GK	(Azerbaijan) AZE	Davud Karimi	10	0	7+2	0	1	0	0	0
32	MF	(Ukraine) UKR	Valeriy Kutsenko	11	0	6+5	0	0	0	0	0
33	DF	(Azerbaijan) AZE	Tarlan Guliyev	25	0	19+1	0	3	0	2	0
65	DF	(Azerbaijan) AZE	Jabir Amirli	21	1	15+3	1	2+1	0	0	0
90	MF	(Azerbaijan) AZE	Orxan Fərəcov	1	0	0+1	0	0	0	0	0
91	FW	(Azerbaijan) AZE	Nurlan Quliyev	1	0	0+1	0	0	0	0	0
93	DF	(Lithuania) LTU	Edvinas Girdvainis	19	1	17+1	1	1	0	0	0
95	MF	(Azerbaijan) AZE	Javid Əliyev	1	0	0	0	0+1	0	0	0
Players away on loan:
Players who left Keşla during the season:
8	MF	(Serbia) SRB	Miloš Bosančić	4	0	1+1	0	0	0	1+1	0
10	MF	(Paraguay) PAR	César Meza	2	2	0	0	0	0	2	2
11	FW	(Uzbekistan) UZB	Bahodir Nasimov	9	0	0+7	0	1	0	1	0
21	MF	(Cameroon) CMR	Hervé Tchami	7	0	3+1	0	1	0	0+2	0
27	DF	(Romania) ROU	Adrian Scarlatache	2	0	1	0	0	0	1	0
31	MF	(Greece) GRE	Giorgos Georgiadis	8	1	6+1	1	1	0	0	0
80	MF	(Mauritania) MTN	Diallo Guidileye	11	0	7+1	0	2+1	0	0	0
88	MF	(Azerbaijan) AZE	Mammad Guliyev	5	0	0+3	0	0	0	0+2	0
90	MF	(The Gambia) GAM	Ebrima Sohna	10	0	7	0	1	0	2	0
97	FW	(Azerbaijan) AZE	Elnur Jafarov	3	0	2+1	0	0	0	0	0

=== Goal scorers ===
Place	Position	Nation	Number	Name	Premier League	Azerbaijan Cup	Europa League	Total
1	FW	(Azerbaijan)	9	Amil Yunanov	5	1	0	6
2	FW	(Togo)	23	Jonathan Ayité	5	0	0	5
3	DF	(Azerbaijan)	4	Slavik Alkhasov	3	0	1	4
4	FW	(Jamaica)	14	Andre Clennon	2	1	0	3
4				Own goal	2	1	0	3
6	DF	(Brazil)	3	Denis Silva	2	0	0	2
6	DF	(Azerbaijan)	2	Sertan Tashkin	2	0	0	2
6	MF	(Serbia)	22	Nikola Mitrović	2	0	0	2
6	MF	(Azerbaijan)	17	Samir Masimov	2	0	0	2
6	MF	(Paraguay)	10	César Meza	0	0	2	2
11	MF	(Greece)	31	Giorgos Georgiadis	1	0	0	1
11	FW	(Azerbaijan)	7	Vagif Javadov	1	0	0	1
11	DF	(Azerbaijan)	65	Jabir Amirli	1	0	0	1
11	MF	(Sierra Leone)	25	John Kamara	1	0	0	1
11	DF	(Lithuania)	93	Edvinas Girdvainis	1	0	0	1
				TOTALS	29	4	3	36

=== Disciplinary record ===
Number	Nation	Position	Name	Premier League		Azerbaijan Cup		Europa League		Total	
Number	Nation	Position	Name	Yellow card	Red card	Yellow card	Red card	Yellow card	Red card	Yellow card	Red card
1	(Azerbaijan)	GK	Kamran Aghayev	3	0	0	0	0	0	3	0
2	(Azerbaijan)	DF	Sertan Tashkin	5	0	1	0	0	0	6	0
3	(Brazil)	DF	Denis Silva	4	1	0	0	0	0	4	1
4	(Azerbaijan)	DF	Slavik Alkhasov	6	0	1	0	0	0	7	0
7	(Azerbaijan)	FW	Vagif Javadov	1	0	0	0	0	0	1	0
8	(Azerbaijan)	MF	Seymur Əsədov	1	0	0	0	0	0	1	0
9	(Azerbaijan)	FW	Amil Yunanov	4	0	0	0	0	0	4	0
11	(Azerbaijan)	MF	Vusal Isgandarli	4	0	0	0	0	0	4	0
14	(Jamaica)	FW	Andre Clennon	4	1	0	0	0	0	4	1
17	(Azerbaijan)	MF	Samir Masimov	4	1	0	0	0	0	4	1
19	(Azerbaijan)	DF	Azer Salahli	3	0	0	0	0	0	3	0
21	(Venezuela)	MF	Ángelo Peña	1	0	0	0	0	0	1	0
22	(Serbia)	MF	Nikola Mitrović	8	0	0	0	0	0	8	0
23	(Togo)	FW	Jonathan Ayité	5	0	1	0	0	0	6	0
24	(Azerbaijan)	MF	Fuad Bayramov	0	0	0	0	1	0	1	0
25	(Sierra Leone)	MF	John Kamara	4	0	0	0	0	0	4	0
30	(Azerbaijan)	GK	Davud Karimi	1	0	0	0	0	0	1	0
32	(Ukraine)	MF	Valeriy Kutsenko	1	0	0	0	0	0	1	0
33	(Azerbaijan)	DF	Tarlan Guliyev	4	0	1	0	0	0	5	0
65	(Azerbaijan)	DF	Jabir Amirli	1	0	0	0	0	0	1	0
91	(Azerbaijan)	FW	Nurlan Quliyev	1	0	0	0	0	0	1	0
93	(Lithuania)	DF	Edvinas Girdvainis	4	1	0	0	0	0	4	1
94	(Azerbaijan)	MF	Seymur Əsədov	0	0	1	0	0	0	1	0
Players away on loan:
Players who left Keşla during the season:
10	(Paraguay)	MF	César Meza	0	0	0	0	1	0	1	0
27	(Romania)	DF	Adrian Scarlatache	1	0	0	0	1	0	2	0
31	(Greece)	MF	Giorgos Georgiadis	1	0	0	0	0	0	1	0
80	(Mauritania)	MF	Diallo Guidileye	3	0	1	0	0	0	4	0
90	(The Gambia)	MF	Ebrima Sohna	3	0	0	0	1	0	4	0
			TOTALS	77	4	6	0	4	0	87	4
