= 2018–19 Sumgayit FK season =

Sumgayit
2018-19 season
- President: Kamran Guliyev
- Manager: Nazim Suleymanov (until 12 November); Aykhan Abbasov (from 14 November)
- Stadium: Kapital Bank Arena
- Premier League: 6th
- Azerbaijan Cup: Runners-Up
- Top goalscorer: League: Five Players (3); All: Peyman Babaei (6)

The Sumgayit FK 2018-19 season was Sumgayit's eight Azerbaijan Premier League season, and ninth season in their history. It is their first season with Nazim Suleymanov as manager.

== Squad ==
As of match played 19 May 2019

No.	Name	Nationality	Position	Date of birth (age)	Signed from	Signed in	Contract ends	Apps.	Goals
Goalkeepers
1	Mehdi Jannatov	(Azerbaijan)	GK	26 January 1992 (age 34)	Anzhi Makhachkala	2017		35	0
12	Rashad Azizli	(Azerbaijan)	GK	1 January 1994 (age 32)	Neftchi Baku	2018	2020	7	0
13	Aydin Bayramov	(Azerbaijan)	GK	18 February 1996 (age 30)	Neftchi Baku	2019	2020	0	0
36	Suleyman Suleymanov	(Azerbaijan)	GK	29 May 1998 (age 28)	Gabala	2017		0	0
Defenders
2	Rail Malikov	(Azerbaijan)	DF	18 December 1985 (age 40)	AZAL	2016		80	0
3	Vurğun Hüseynov	(Azerbaijan)	DF	25 April 1988 (age 38)	Gabala	2013		170	1
4	Shahriyar Aliyev	(Azerbaijan)	DF	25 December 1992 (age 33)	Kapaz	2018		23	4
5	Adil Naghiyev	(Azerbaijan)	DF	11 September 1995 (age 31)	Zira	2018	2020	15	0
21	Arif Dashdemirov	(Azerbaijan)	DF	10 February 1987 (age 39)	Qarabağ	2018		28	0
44	Gvanzav Mahammadov	(Azerbaijan)	DF	8 June 1994 (age 32)	Sabah	2018		3	0
74	Yusif Nabiyev	(Azerbaijan)	DF	25 April 1988 (age 38)	loan from Gabala	2018		44	4
	Elvin Dəmirov	(Azerbaijan)	DF	17 April 1998 (age 28)		2018		1	0
Midfielders
7	Javid Taghiyev	(Azerbaijan)	MF	22 July 1992 (age 34)	Zira	2017		49	2
9	Ehtiram Shahverdiyev	(Azerbaijan)	MF	1 October 1996 (age 30)	Gabala	2017		47	1
10	Aleksey Isayev	(Russia)	MF	9 November 1995 (age 31)	Zenit St.Petersburg	2018		31	0
15	Amir Agayev	(Israel)	MF	10 February 1992 (age 34)	Hapoel Tel Aviv	2019	2020	10	2
17	Nijat Gurbanov	(Azerbaijan)	MF	17 February 1992 (age 34)	Zira	2018		26	2
18	Suleyman Ahmadov	(Azerbaijan)	MF	25 November 1999 (age 26)	Qarabağ	2018		19	1
20	Rüfət Abdullazadə	(Azerbaijan)	MF	17 January 2001 (age 25)		2017		2	0
22	Afran Ismayilov	(Azerbaijan)	MF	8 October 1988 (age 38)	Qarabağ	2018		24	3
25	Baxşəli Baxşəliyev	(Azerbaijan)	MF	9 March 1998 (age 28)		2019		2	0
34	Elvin Badalov	(Azerbaijan)	MF	14 June 1995 (age 31)	Sabah	2019		6	0
38	Mushfig Rzayev	(Azerbaijan)	MF	23 March 1998 (age 28)	Solyaris Moscow	2017		0	0
41	Turan Manafov	(Azerbaijan)	MF	19 September 1998 (age 28)	Qarabağ	2018		1	0
60	Elvin Mammadov	(Azerbaijan)	MF	18 July 1988 (age 38)	Gabala	2018		18	2
77	Murad Khachayev	(Azerbaijan)	MF	14 April 1998 (age 28)	loan from Shakhtar Donetsk	2018		9	1
97	Khayal Najafov	(Azerbaijan)	MF	19 December 1997 (age 28)	Academy	2016		81	0
99	Ali Babayev	(Azerbaijan)	MF	1 November 1990 (age 36)	Hapoel Ra'anana	2018		31	1
Forwards
8	Peyman Babaei	(Iran)	ST	14 February 1994 (age 32)	loan from Machine Sazi	2019	2020	14	6
11	Atilla Yildirim	(Turkey)	ST	22 November 1990 (age 35)	MVV Maastricht	2018		18	3
49	İbrahim Əliyev	(Azerbaijan)	ST	17 July 1999 (age 27)	Qarabağ	2019		2	0
70	Ulvi Isgandarov	(Azerbaijan)	ST	17 April 1998 (age 28)	loan from Gabala	2018		20	5
Left during the season
8	Orkhan Aliyev	(Azerbaijan)	MF	21 December 1995 (age 30)	Sabail	2018		74	14
14	Bakhtiyar Hasanalizade	(Azerbaijan)	DF	29 December 1992 (age 33)	Academy	2011		174	4
15	Orkhan Sadigli	(Azerbaijan)	GK	19 March 1993 (age 33)	loan from Keşla	2018		3	0
39	Tural Bayramli	(Azerbaijan)	MF	7 January 1998 (age 28)	Academy	2016		4	0
50	Peyman Keshavarzi	(Iran)	DF	3 March 1996 (age 30)	Gostaresh Foulad	2019	2019	0	0

== Transfers ==
=== In ===
Date	Position	Nationality	Name	From	Fee	Ref.
11 June 2018	MF	(Azerbaijan)	Afran Ismayilov	Qarabağ	Undisclosed	
11 June 2018	MF	(Azerbaijan)	Elvin Mammadov	Gabala	Free	
12 June 2018	DF	(Azerbaijan)	Shahriyar Aliyev	Kapaz	Undisclosed	
26 June 2018	MF	(Russia)	Aleksey Isayev	Zenit St.Petersburg	Undisclosed	
3 July 2018	DF	(Azerbaijan)	Dmitri Naghiyev	Karabakh Wien	Undisclosed	
9 July 2018	MF	(Azerbaijan)	Ali Babayev	Hapoel Ra'anana	Undisclosed	
13 July 2018	DF	(Azerbaijan)	Gvanzav Mahammadov	Sabah	Undisclosed	
6 August 2018	DF	(Azerbaijan)	Arif Dashdemirov	Qarabağ	Undisclosed	
23 August 2018	FW	(Turkey)	Atilla Yildirim	MVV Maastricht	Undisclosed	
25 December 2018	GK	(Azerbaijan)	Rashad Azizli	Neftchi Baku	Undisclosed	
27 December 2018	DF	(Azerbaijan)	Adil Naghiyev	Zira	Undisclosed	
6 January 2019	GK	(Azerbaijan)	Aydin Bayramov	Sabah	Undisclosed	
29 January 2019	DF	(Iran)	Peyman Keshavarzi	Gostaresh Foulad	Undisclosed	
31 January 2019	MF	(Israel)	Amir Agayev	Hapoel Tel Aviv	Undisclosed	
	MF	(Azerbaijan)	Orkhan Aliyev	Sabail	Undisclosed	
	FW	(Azerbaijan)	İbrahim Əliyev	Qarabağ	Undisclosed	

=== Loans in ===
Date from	Position	Nationality	Name	From	Date to	Ref.
12 June 2018	DF	(Azerbaijan)	Yusif Nabiyev	Gabala	End of Season	
13 June 2018	MF	(Azerbaijan)	Murad Khachayev	Shakhtar Donetsk	End of Season	
17 August 2018	GK	(Azerbaijan)	Orkhan Sadigli	Keşla	8 January 2019	
16 January 2019	FW	(Iran)	Peyman Babaei	Machine Sazi	Summer 2020	

=== Out ===
Date	Position	Nationality	Name	To	Fee	Ref.
8 June 2018	MF	(Azerbaijan)	Vugar Beybalayev	Sabail	Undisclosed	
11 June 2018	DF	(Azerbaijan)	Tural Akhundov	Neftchi Baku	Undisclosed	
12 June 2018	MF	(Azerbaijan)	Rashad Eyyubov	Neftchi Baku	Undisclosed	
13 June 2018	MF	(Azerbaijan)	Kamal Mirzayev	Zira	Undisclosed	
14 June 2018	DF	(Azerbaijan)	Azer Salahli	Keşla	Undisclosed	
14 June 2018	FW	(Azerbaijan)	Amil Yunanov	Keşla	Undisclosed	
12 July 2018	MF	(Azerbaijan)	Javid Imamverdiyev	Sabah	Undisclosed	
4 August 2018	DF	(Azerbaijan)	Dmitri Naghiyev	Cova da Piedade	Undisclosed	
27 December 2018	DF	(Azerbaijan)	Bakhtiyar Hasanalizade	Zira	Undisclosed	
18 February 2019	MF	(Azerbaijan)	Tural Bayramli	Daugavpils	Undisclosed	

=== Released ===
Date	Position	Nationality	Name	Joined	Date	Ref.
14 June 2018	GK	(Azerbaijan)	Farhad Valiyev	Retired		
	MF	(Azerbaijan)	Elnur Abdullayev			
	MF	(Azerbaijan)	Orkhan Aliyev			
14 February 2019	DF	(Iran)	Peyman Keshavarzi	Sabail	June 2020	

=== Trial ===
Date From	Position	Nationality	Name	Last club	Date To	Ref.
December 2018	DF	(Russia)	Mutalip Alibekov	Khimki		

== Friendlies ==
15 January 2019	Sumgayit (Azerbaijan)	v	(Kazakhstan) Zhetysu	Antalya, Turkey
AZST (UTC+4)
Note: match cancelled due to heavy rain in Antalya.

16 January 2019	Sumgayit (Azerbaijan)	1 – 1	(Kazakhstan) Zhetysu	Antalya, Turkey
AZST (UTC+4)	Isgandarov	Report	Goal

19 January 2019	Sumgayit (Azerbaijan)	v	(Bosnia and Herzegovina) Čelik Zenica	Antalya, Turkey
AZST (UTC+4)		Report

22 January 2019	Sumgayit (Azerbaijan)	3 – 1	(North Macedonia) Vardar	Antalya, Turkey
AZST (UTC+4)	Dashdemirov 53'; K.Najafov 53'; Mammadov 87'	Report	Novak 39'

26 January 2019	Sumgayit (Azerbaijan)	2 – 1	(Serbia) Zemun	Antalya, Turkey
AZST (UTC+4)	Y.Nabiyev 24'; Isgandarov 63'	Report	Mrkaić 90+1'

== Competitions ==
=== Premier League ===
==== Results summary ====
Overall								Home						Away					
Pld	W	D	L	GF	GA	GD	Pts	W	D	L	GF	GA	GD	W	D	L	GF	GA	GD
28	8	5	15	24	42	−18	29	5	1	8	11	23	−12	3	4	7	13	19	−6

Last updated: 11 May 2019.
Source: See Results

==== Results ====
11 August 2018 1	Sumgayit	0 – 2	Neftçi Baku	Baku
20:00 AZT (UTC+4)	S.Ahmadov (yellow card) 36'; Hüseynov (yellow card) 56' (yellow-red card) 67'	Report	M.Abbasov 27'; Mirzabeyov (yellow card) 62'; Mahmudov 71'; A.Krivotsyuk (yellow card) 88'	Stadium: Dalga Arena; Attendance: 800; Referee: Rauf Jabbarov

19 August 2018 2	Sabah	1 – 4	Sumgayit	Masazır
20:30 AZT (UTC+4)	Dević 10' (yellow card) 90+5'; Kvashuk (yellow card) 20'	Report	N.Gurbanov 19'; Mammadov 34' (pen.); S.Aliyev 43'; Isgandarov 85'	Stadium: Alinja Arena; Attendance: 500; Referee: Aliyar Ağayev

25 August 2018 3	Gabala	1 – 1	Sumgayit	Qabala
18:00 AZT (UTC+4)	Khalilzade 43' (pen.) (yellow card) 90+1'	Report	N.Gurbanov (yellow card) 33' (yellow-red card) 77'; Malikov (yellow card) 42'; Isayev (yellow card) 45+1'; Y.Nabiyev 90+3'	Stadium: Gabala City Stadium; Attendance: 300; Referee: Ravan Həmzəzadə

14 September 2018 4	Qarabağ	1 – 0	Sumgayit	Baku
20:00 AZT (UTC+4)	Ozobić 21' (pen.); Rzeźniczak (yellow card) 29'; Agolli (yellow card) 90+1'	Report	Y.Nabiyev (yellow card) 21'	Stadium: Azersun Arena; Attendance: 1,600; Referee: Ingilab Məmmədov

23 September 2018 5	Keşla	1 – 2	Sumgayit	Baku
18:30 AZT (UTC+4)	Sohna (yellow card) 41'; S.Alkhasov 44'; Clennon (yellow card) 51' (yellow-red card) 90+2'; Mitrović (yellow card) 68'; Denis (yellow card) 80'	Report	Babayev (yellow card) 41'; Taghiyev 47'; Ismayilov 67'; B.Hasanalizade (yellow card) 80'; S.Ahmadov (yellow card) 81'	Stadium: ASK Arena; Attendance: 400; Referee: Orkhan Məmmədov

30 September 2018 6	Sumgayit	1 – 0	Zira	Baku
20:00 AZT (UTC+4)	Yildirim 16'; Dzhenetov (yellow card) 83'	Report	Tounkara (yellow card) 67'; K.Mirzayev (yellow card) 70'; Qirtimov (yellow card) 89'	Stadium: Bayil Arena; Attendance: 700; Referee: Vugar Həsənli

5 October 2018 7	Sabail	2 – 0	Sumgayit	Baku
19:00 AZT (UTC+4)	F.Muradbayli 3'; Qurbanov 30'; Kitanovski (yellow card) 90+2'; Pacheco (yellow card) 90+4'	Report	Malikov (yellow card) 45'	Stadium: Bayil Arena; Attendance: 500; Referee: Aliyar Ağayev

21 October 2018 8	Sumgayit	0 – 1	Sabah	Baku
17:00 AZT (UTC+4)	Hüseynov (red card) 15'; N.Gurbanov (yellow card) 34'; Taghiyev (yellow card) 44'	Report	Bosančić 36' (yellow card) 59'; E.Nabiyev (yellow card) 56'; Ramos (yellow card) 74'; Dević (yellow card) 84'	Stadium: Dalga Arena; Attendance: 200; Referee: Ingilab Məmmədov

27 October 2018 9	Sumgayit	2 – 2	Gabala	Baku
18:00 AZT (UTC+4)	S.Aliyev 7', 19' (yellow card) 90+2'; Taghiyev (yellow card) 65'; Yildirim (yellow card) 72'; Mahammadov (yellow card) 90+2'	Report	Joseph-Monrose 42'; Aliyev (yellow card) 45' (yellow-red card) 90+2'; Atakora 56' (yellow card) 84'; J.Huseynov (yellow card) 71'; Ag.Mammadov (yellow card) 90+2'; Gurbanov (yellow card) 90+2'; B.Mustafazade (red card) 90+2'	Stadium: Dalga Arena; Attendance: 200; Referee: Orkhan Məmmədov

3 November 2018 10	Qarabağ	2 – 0	Sumgayit	Baku
19:00 AZT (UTC+4)	Slavchev 25'; Delarge 57'	Report	B.Hasanalizade (yellow card) 65'; S.Aliyev (yellow card) 75'; Dashdemirov (yellow card) 79'	Stadium: Tofiq Bahramov Republican Stadium; Attendance: 300; Referee: Vugar Həsənli

11 November 2018 11	Sumgayit	1 – 4	Keşla	Baku
19:30 AZT (UTC+4)	Babayev (yellow card) 20'; Yildirim 65'; O.Sadigli (red card) 67'; S.Aliyev (yellow card) 90+5'	Report	S.Alkhasov (yellow card) 22'; Yunanov 53', 79'; Georgiadis 56' (yellow card) 66'; S.Tashkin (yellow card) 64'; Jannatov 90+3' (o.g.)	Stadium: Bayil Arena; Attendance: 250; Referee: Aliyar Ağayev

25 November 2018 12	Zira	3 – 1	Sumgayit	Baku
19:00 AZT (UTC+4)	Dedov 36', 74'; Qirtimov (yellow card) 52'; Naghiyev (yellow card) 60'; Hamdi 90+6'	Report	B.Hasanalizade (yellow card) 13'; Ismayilov 45+3'; S.Aliyev (yellow card) 74'	Stadium: Dalga Arena; Attendance: 200; Referee: Sabuhi Bayramov

1 December 2018 13	Sumgayit	1 – 0	Sabail	Baku
19:00 AZT (UTC+4)	Ismayilov (yellow card) 48'; Yildirim 59'; Jannatov (yellow card) 80'; K.Najafov (yellow card) 81'; N.Gurbanov (yellow card) 90+5'	Report	U.İsmayılov (yellow card) 37'; Henrique (yellow card) 45'	Stadium: Bayil Arena; Attendance: 1,000; Referee: Aliyar Ağayev

9 December 2018 14	Neftçi Baku	0 – 0	Sumgayit	Baku
19:30 AZT (UTC+4)	Petrov (yellow card) 40'; Alaskarov (yellow card) 53'; Buludov (yellow card) 90+1'	Report		Stadium: Bakcell Arena; Attendance: 1,000; Referee: Ravan Həmzəzadə

3 February 2019 15	Gabala	1 – 0	Sumgayit	Qabala
14:00 AZST (UTC+4)	Volkovi (yellow card) 43'; A.Seydiyev (yellow card) 57'; Abbasov (yellow card) 79'; Joseph-Monrose 84'	Report		Stadium: Gabala City Stadium; Attendance: 530; Referee: Aliyar Ağayev

9 February 2019 16	Sumgayit	0 – 2	Qarabağ	Sumqayit
18:30 AZT (UTC+4)	K.Najafov (yellow card) 23'; Babayev (yellow card) 45+1'; Ismayilov (yellow card) 69'; E.Shahverdiyev (yellow card) 78'; Isayev (yellow card) 90'	Report	Ozobić 20' (yellow card) 57'; H.Hajili (yellow card) 29'; Richard (yellow card) 54'; Guerrier (yellow card) 69'; Huseynov 81'	Stadium: Kapital Bank Arena; Attendance: 1,500; Referee: Orkhan Məmmədov

16 February 2019 17	Keşla	2 – 1	Sumgayit	Baku
15:00 AZT (UTC+4)	Yunanov 28'; A.Salahli (yellow card) 38'; Mitrović (yellow card) 50' (goal) 90+1' (pen.); Ayité (yellow card) 90+1'	Report	Agayev (yellow card) 22'; Ismayilov 72'	Stadium: ASK Arena; Attendance: 500; Referee: Rauf Jabbarov

24 February 2019 18	Sumgayit	0 – 1	Zira	Sumqayit
18:30 AZT (UTC+4)	Naghiyev (yellow card) 83'; Babayev (yellow card) 90+4'	Report	Kgaswane 23'	Stadium: Kapital Bank Arena; Attendance: 1,500; Referee: Aliyar Ağayev

2 March 2019 19	Sabail	0 – 0	Sumgayit	Baku
16:00 AZT (UTC+4)	Ə.Qarəhmədov (yellow card) 34'; Yunuszade (yellow card) 46'	Report	Hüseynov (yellow card) 60'	Stadium: Bayil Arena; Attendance: 400; Referee: Sabuhi Bayramov

10 March 2019 20	Sumgayit	1 – 2	Neftçi Baku	Sumqayit
16:30 AZT (UTC+4)	Babaei 26' (yellow card) 65'; Malikov (yellow card) 72'; Jannatov (red card) 77'; Isgandarov (yellow card) 83'; Babayev (yellow card) 84'	Report	Dabo (yellow card) 19'; M.Kane (yellow card) 29'; Platellas (yellow card) 57'; Mammadov (yellow card) 75'; Petrov (yellow card) 76'; Mbodj 76'; Buludov 87'; A.Şirinov (yellow card) 87'; Sansone (yellow card) 89'; Alaskarov (yellow card) 90+3'	Stadium: Kapital Bank Arena; Attendance: 2,000; Referee: Raad Ahmədov

15 March 2019 21	Sabah	1 – 1	Sumgayit	Masazır
16:00 AZT (UTC+4)	Dević (yellow card) 28' (yellow-red card) 29'; Diniyev (yellow card) 43'; Eyyubov 77'; Ramos (yellow card) 82'	Report	Babayev (yellow card) 14'; N.Gurbanov (yellow card) 17'; Naghiyev (yellow card) 32'; Mammadov 40'; Hüseynov (yellow card) 45+1'; Yildirim (yellow card) 82'	Stadium: Alinja Arena; Attendance: 1,000; Referee: Orkhan Məmmədov

1 April 2019 22	Sumgayit	0 – 6	Qarabağ	Sumqayit
18:30 AZT (UTC+4)	S.Aliyev (yellow card) 82'	Report	Quintana 17'; Madatov 21', 40'; Míchel (yellow card) 35'; Ozobić 51'; Zoubir 78', 84'	Stadium: Kapital Bank Arena; Attendance: 2,000; Referee: Ravan Həmzəzadə

6 April 2019 23	Sumgayit	2 – 1	Keşla	Sumqayit
16:00 AZT (UTC+4)	Babaei 4'; K.Najafov (yellow card) 43'; Taghiyev 85'; S.Aliyev (yellow card) 86'	Report	Masimov 41'; Isgandarli (yellow card) 90'; Mitrović (yellow card) 90+5'	Stadium: Kapital Bank Arena; Attendance: 1,000; Referee: Orkhan Məmmədov

13 April 2019 24	Zira	2 – 0	Sumgayit	Zirə
16:00 AZT (UTC+4)	Rodríguez 33'; Mutallimov (yellow card) 74'; Qirtimov 90+2'	Report	Babayev (yellow card) 38'; Hüseynov (yellow card) 42'	Stadium: Zira Olympic Sport Complex Stadium; Attendance: 500; Referee: Aliyar Ağayev

18 April 2019 24	Sumgyit	1 – 2	Sabail	Sumqayit
16:45 AZT (UTC+4)	Babaei 14'; Dashdemirov (yellow card) 19'; K.Najafov (yellow card) 58'; Taghiyev (yellow card) 63'	Report	Ramazanov 52'; Kitanovski (yellow card) 55' (yellow-red card) 58'; Akpoveta 75'; E.Ahmadov (yellow card) 90+2'	Stadium: Kapital Bank Arena; Attendance: 1,000; Referee: Vugar Həsənli

27 April 2019 25	Neftçi Baku	2 – 3	Sumgayit	Baku
19:00 AZT (UTC+4)	Abışov 8'; Racu (yellow card) 21'; Mustivar (yellow card) 41'; Dabo 72' (yellow card) 90+3'	Report	Agayev 32'; Isgandarov 42'; Jannatov (yellow card) 57'; S.Aliyev (yellow card) 72'; M.Khachayev 77'; N.Gurbanov (yellow card) 81'	Stadium: Bakcell Arena; Attendance: 1,000; Referee: Kamal Umudlu

5 May 2019 27	Sumgayit	1 – 0	Sabah	Sumqayit
20:00 AZT (UTC+4)	E.Badalov (yellow card) 36'; Agayev 50'; Isayev (yellow card) 64'; Babayev (yellow card) 65'; Jannatov (yellow card) 89'; M.Khachayev (yellow card) 90+1'	Report	M.Isayev (yellow card) 38'; Diniyev (yellow card) 51'; Ivanović (yellow card) 77'; Eyyubov (yellow card) 87'	Stadium: Kapital Bank Arena; Attendance: 1,500; Referee: Vugar Həsənli

11 May 2019 28	Sumgayit	1 – 0	Gabala	Sumqayit
16:00 AZT (UTC+4)	Hüseynov (yellow card) 64'; Isgandarov 68'; N.Gurbanov (yellow card) 78'; R.Azizli (yellow card) 90+5'	Report	R.Muradov (yellow card) 45'; J.Huseynov (yellow card) 57'; Stanković (yellow card) 71'; E.Jamalov (yellow card) 88'; R.Aliyev (yellow card) 90+3'	Stadium: Kapital Bank Arena; Attendance: 1,000; Referee: Raad Əhmədov

==== League table ====
Pos	Team	Pld	W	D	L	GF	GA	GD	Pts	Qualification or relegation
4	Gabala	28	9	9	10	31	33	−2	36	Qualification for the Europa League second qualifying round
5	Zira	28	8	7	13	30	40	−10	31	
6	Sumgayit	28	8	5	15	24	42	−18	29	
7	Sabah	28	7	6	15	20	41	−21	27	
8	Keşla	28	6	5	17	29	45	−16	23	

Source: Soccerway
Rules for classification: 1) Points; 2) Head-to-head points; 3) Head-to-head goal difference; 4) Head-to-head goals scored; 5) Head-to-head away goals scored (only if two teams); 6) Goal difference; 7) Goals scored.

=== Azerbaijan Cup ===
6 December 2018 Second Round	Qaradağ Lökbatan	0 – 4	Sumgayit	Baku
13:30 AZT (UTC+4)	B.Teymurov (yellow card) 26'; I.Abdullayev (yellow card) 45'; R.Şahmuradov (yellow card) 45'	Report	N.Gurbanov 14'; S.Ahmadov 29'; Mahammadov (yellow card) 39'; Isgandarov 69', 86' (yellow card) 90+1'; R.Abdullazadə (yellow card) 90'	Stadium: Lökbatan Olympic Sport Complex Stadium; Attendance: 200; Referee: Alik Yunusov

15 December 2018 Quarterfinal 1st leg	Neftchi Baku	0 – 2	Sumgayit	Baku
19:00 AZT (UTC+4)	Aghayev (yellow card) 26'; Akhundov (yellow card) 72'; Hajiyev (yellow card) 86'; A.Krivotsyuk (yellow card) 86' (yellow-red card) 88'	Report	Babayev 28' (pen.); Aliyev (yellow card) 45+1' (goal) 45+1'; Dashdemirov (yellow card) 70'; Hüseynov (yellow card) 79'	Stadium: Bakcell Arena; Attendance: 1,000; Referee: Aliyar Ağayev

19 December 2018 Quarterfinal 2nd leg	Sumgayit	0 – 1 (2 – 1 agg.)	Neftchi Baku	Sumqayit
19:00 AZT (UTC+4)	Dashdemirov (yellow card) 23' (yellow-red card) 85'; Babayev (yellow card) 33'; B.Hasanalizade (yellow card) 62'; Hüseynov (yellow card) 84'; Isayev (yellow card) 90+7'	Report	Buludov (yellow card) 28'; Alaskarov 43'; Petrov (yellow card) 85'	Stadium: Kapital Bank Arena; Attendance: 1,200; Referee: Orkhan Məmmədov

23 April 2019 Semifinal 1st leg	Sumgayit	0 – 0	Zira	Sumqayit
18:30 AZT (UTC+4)	Mammadov (yellow card) 32'	Report	Rodríguez (yellow card) 25'; Tounkara (yellow card) 46'	Stadium: Kapital Bank Arena; Attendance: 1,100; Referee: Sabuhi Bayramov

1 May 2019 Semifinal 2nd leg	Zira	3 – 3 (3 – 3 a agg.)	Sumgayit	Baku
20:00 AZT (UTC+4)	I.Muradov (yellow card) 28'; Fardjad-Azad 47'; Scarlatache (yellow card) 78'; Rodríguez 84'; Hamdi (yellow card) 90+1'; Tigroudja 90+4'	Report	Hüseynov (yellow card) 7'; Babaei 20', 28', 45'; Isayev (yellow card) 74'; Jannatov (yellow card) 89'	Stadium: Dalga Arena; Attendance: 1,000; Referee: Aliyar Ağayev

==== Final ====
19 May 2019	Gabala	1 – 0	Sumgayit	Nakhchivan
16:30 AZT (UTC+4)	Joseph-Monrose 3' (yellow card) 90+5'; R.Aliyev (yellow card) 45'; Nazirov (yellow card) 90+2'; B.Mustafazade (yellow card) 90+6'	Report	Naghiyev (yellow card) 60'; Y.Nabiyev (yellow card) 70'; Hüseynov (yellow card) 90+1'; Taghiyev (red card) 90+5'	Stadium: Nakhchivan City Stadium; Attendance: 10,000; Referee: İnqilab Məmmədov

== Squad statistics ==
As of match played 19 May 2019

=== Appearances and goals ===
No.	Pos	Nat	Player	Total		Premier League		Azerbaijan Cup	
No.	Pos	Nat	Player	Apps	Goals	Apps	Goals	Apps	Goals
1	GK	(Russia) RUS	Mehdi Jannatov	26	0	20+1	0	5	0
2	DF	(Azerbaijan) AZE	Rail Malikov	28	0	23+1	0	3+1	0
3	DF	(Azerbaijan) AZE	Vurğun Hüseynov	25	0	18+3	0	4	0
4	DF	(Azerbaijan) AZE	Shahriyar Aliyev	23	4	15+3	3	5	1
5	DF	(Azerbaijan) AZE	Adil Naghiyev	15	0	12	0	3	0
7	MF	(Azerbaijan) AZE	Javid Taghiyev	29	2	21+4	2	1+3	0
8	FW	(Iran) IRI	Peyman Babaei	14	6	10+1	3	3	3
9	MF	(Azerbaijan) AZE	Ehtiram Shahverdiyev	8	0	6+2	0	0	0
10	MF	(Russia) RUS	Aleksey Isayev	31	0	26+1	0	4	0
11	FW	(Turkey) TUR	Atilla Yildirim	18	3	11+5	3	2	0
12	GK	(Azerbaijan) AZE	Rashad Azizli	7	0	6+1	0	0	0
15	MF	(Israel) ISR	Amir Agayev	10	2	3+4	2	1+2	0
17	MF	(Azerbaijan) AZE	Nijat Gurbanov	21	2	5+12	1	1+3	1
18	MF	(Azerbaijan) AZE	Suleyman Ahmadov	14	1	7+3	0	3+1	1
20	MF	(Azerbaijan) AZE	Rüfət Abdullazadə	1	0	0	0	1	0
21	DF	(Azerbaijan) AZE	Arif Dashdemirov	28	0	21+3	0	4	0
22	MF	(Azerbaijan) AZE	Afran Ismayilov	24	3	16+4	3	4	0
25	MF	(Azerbaijan) AZE	Baxşəli Baxşəliyev	2	0	1+1	0	0	0
34	MF	(Azerbaijan) AZE	Elvin Badalov	6	0	3+1	0	1+1	0
41	MF	(Azerbaijan) AZE	Turan Manafov	1	0	1	0	0	0
44	DF	(Azerbaijan) AZE	Gvanzav Mahammadov	3	0	0+2	0	1	0
49	FW	(Azerbaijan) AZE	İbrahim Əliyev	2	0	0+2	0	0	0
60	MF	(Azerbaijan) AZE	Elvin Mammadov	18	2	10+5	2	3	0
70	FW	(Azerbaijan) AZE	Ulvi Isgandarov	14	5	4+8	3	1+1	2
74	DF	(Azerbaijan) AZE	Yusif Nabiyev	26	1	19+2	1	5	0
77	MF	(Azerbaijan) AZE	Murad Khachayev	9	1	3+4	1	1+1	0
97	MF	(Azerbaijan) AZE	Khayal Najafov	17	0	8+5	0	1+3	0
99	MF	(Azerbaijan) AZE	Ali Babayev	30	1	24+1	0	5	1
	DF	(Azerbaijan) AZE	Elvin Dəmirov	1	0	0	0	1	0
Players who left Sumgayit during the season:
8	MF	(Azerbaijan) AZE	Orkhan Aliyev	1	0	0	0	0+1	0
14	DF	(Azerbaijan) AZE	Bakhtiyar Hasanalizade	16	0	13+1	0	2	0
15	GK	(Azerbaijan) AZE	Orkhan Sadigli	3	0	2	0	1	0
39	MF	(Azerbaijan) AZE	Tural Bayramli	1	0	0	0	0+1	0

=== Goal scorers ===
Place	Position	Nation	Number	Name	Premier League	Azerbaijan Cup	Total
1	FW	(Iran)	8	Peyman Babaei	3	3	6
2	FW	(Azerbaijan)	70	Ulvi Isgandarov	3	2	5
3	DF	(Azerbaijan)	4	Şehriyar Aliyev	3	1	3
4	FW	(Turkey)	11	Atilla Yildirim	3	0	3
4	MF	(Azerbaijan)	22	Afran Ismayilov	3	0	3
6	MF	(Azerbaijan)	60	Elvin Mammadov	2	0	2
6	MF	(Azerbaijan)	7	Javid Taghiyev	2	0	2
6	MF	(Israel)	15	Amir Agayev	2	0	2
6	MF	(Azerbaijan)	17	Nijat Gurbanov	1	1	2
10	DF	(Azerbaijan)	74	Yusif Nabiyev	1	0	1
10	MF	(Azerbaijan)	77	Murad Khachayev	1	0	1
10	MF	(Azerbaijan)	18	Suleyman Ahmadov	0	1	1
10	MF	(Azerbaijan)	99	Ali Babayev	0	1	1
				TOTALS	24	9	33

=== Disciplinary record ===
Number	Nation	Position	Name	Premier League		Azerbaijan Cup		Total	
Number	Nation	Position	Name	Yellow card	Red card	Yellow card	Red card	Yellow card	Red card
1	(Russia)	GK	Mehdi Jannatov	4	1	1	0	5	1
2	(Azerbaijan)	DF	Rail Malikov	3	0	0	0	3	0
3	(Azerbaijan)	DF	Vurğun Hüseynov	6	2	4	0	10	2
4	(Azerbaijan)	DF	Shahriyar Aliyev	7	0	1	0	8	0
5	(Azerbaijan)	DF	Adil Naghiyev	2	0	1	0	3	0
7	(Azerbaijan)	MF	Javid Taghiyev	3	0	0	1	3	1
8	(Iran)	FW	Peyman Babaei	1	0	0	0	1	0
9	(Azerbaijan)	MF	Ehtiram Shahverdiyev	1	0	0	0	1	0
10	(Russia)	MF	Aleksey Isayev	3	0	2	0	5	0
11	(Turkey)	FW	Atilla Yildirim	2	0	0	0	2	0
12	(Azerbaijan)	GK	Rashad Azizli	1	0	0	0	1	0
15	(Israel)	MF	Amir Agayev	1	0	0	0	1	0
17	(Azerbaijan)	MF	Nijat Gurbanov	7	1	0	0	7	1
18	(Azerbaijan)	MF	Suleyman Ahmadov	2	0	0	0	2	0
20	(Azerbaijan)	MF	Rüfət Abdullazadə	0	0	1	0	1	0
21	(Azerbaijan)	DF	Arif Dashdemirov	2	0	3	1	5	1
22	(Azerbaijan)	MF	Afran Ismayilov	2	0	0	0	2	0
34	(Azerbaijan)	MF	Elvin Badalov	1	0	0	0	1	0
44	(Azerbaijan)	DF	Gvanzav Mahammadov	1	0	1	0	2	0
60	(Azerbaijan)	MF	Elvin Mammadov	0	0	1	0	1	0
70	(Azerbaijan)	FW	Ulvi Isgandarov	1	0	1	0	2	0
74	(Azerbaijan)	DF	Yusif Nabiyev	1	0	1	0	2	0
77	(Azerbaijan)	MF	Murad Khachayev	1	0	0	0	1	0
97	(Azerbaijan)	MF	Khayal Najafov	3	0	0	0	3	0
99	(Azerbaijan)	MF	Ali Babayev	9	0	1	0	10	0
Players who left Sumgayit during the season:
14	(Azerbaijan)	DF	Bakhtiyar Hasanalizade	3	0	1	0	4	0
15	(Azerbaijan)	GK	Orkhan Sadigli	0	1	0	0	0	1
			TOTALS	67	5	19	2	86	7
