= 2017–18 Keşla FK season =

Keşla
2017–18 season
- Manager: Zaur Svanadze (until 29 October); Ramiz Mammadov (from 29 October-25 December); Yuriy Maksymov (from 25 December)
- Stadium: Inter Arena
- Premier League: 6th
- Azerbaijan Cup: Champions
- Europa League: Second Qualifying Round vs Fola Esch
- Top goalscorer: League: Three Players (4); All: Pardis Fardjad-Azad (8)

The Keşla 2017–18 season was Inter Baku's seventeenth Azerbaijan Premier League season.

== Season events ==
On 28 October 2017, Inter Baku officially changed their name to Keşla FK. Following a 0–2 against Kapaz on 28 October, Keşla replaced Zaur Svanadze with Ramiz Mammadov the next day. On 25 December, Keşla announced that Ramie Mammadov had become the club's Sporting Director, with Yuriy Maksymov coming in as the club's new manager.

== Squad ==
As of 30 January 2018

Note: Flags indicate national team as defined under FIFA eligibility rules; some limited exceptions apply. Players may hold more than one non-FIFA nationality.

No.	Pos.	Nation	Player
1	GK	AZE	Kamran Aghayev
2	DF	AZE	Sertan Tashkin
3	DF	BRA	Denis Silva
4	DF	AZE	Slavik Alkhasov
7	FW	AZE	Vagif Javadov
9	FW	AZE	Pardis Fardjad-Azad
10	MF	PAR	César Meza
13	GK	AZE	Orkhan Sadigli
14	FW	JAM	Andre Clennon
16	GK	AZE	Shahin Zakiyev
19	MF	ARG	Pablo Podio (loan from Fastav Zlín)
20	MF	AZE	Agshin Guluzade
21	MF	CMR	Hervé Tchami

No.	Pos.	Nation	Player
22	MF	AZE	Magsad Isayev
24	MF	AZE	Fuad Bayramov
27	DF	ROU	Adrian Scarlatache
33	DF	AZE	Tarlan Guliyev
39	FW	AZE	Alibey Mammadli
40	MF	SRB	Nemanja Stojanovic (loan from Karabakh Wien)
65	MF	AZE	Jabir Amirli
66	DF	AZE	Murad Gayali
77	MF	AZE	Oleg Huseynov
88	MF	AZE	Mammad Guliyev
90	MF	GAM	Ebrima Sohna
98	FW	AZE	Gara Garayev

=== On loan ===
Note: Flags indicate national team as defined under FIFA eligibility rules; some limited exceptions apply. Players may hold more than one non-FIFA nationality.

No. / Pos. / Nation / Player; 7 / MF / AZE / Mirsahib Abbasov (at Zira)	No. / Pos. / Nation / Player; 99 / DF / AZE / Rijat Garayev (at Sabah)

== Transfers ==
=== Summer ===
In: Note: Flags indicate national team as defined under FIFA eligibility rules; some limited exceptions apply. Players may hold more than one non-FIFA nationality.

No.	Pos.	Nation	Player

Out: Note: Flags indicate national team as defined under FIFA eligibility rules; some limited exceptions apply. Players may hold more than one non-FIFA nationality.

No.	Pos.	Nation	Player
1	GK	AZE	Salahat Aghayev (to (Azerbaijan) Neftchi Baku)
11	FW	AZE	Rauf Aliyev (to (Albania) Kukësi)
14	DF	GEO	Zurab Khizanishvili (Retired)
17	DF	AZE	Abbas Huseynov (to (Azerbaijan) Qarabağ)
45	FW	AZE	Ilkin Sadigov (to (Azerbaijan) Turan-Tovuz)

=== Winter ===
In: Note: Flags indicate national team as defined under FIFA eligibility rules; some limited exceptions apply. Players may hold more than one non-FIFA nationality.

No.	Pos.	Nation	Player
1	GK	AZE	Kamran Aghayev (from (Czech Republic) Mladá Boleslav)
7	FW	AZE	Vagif Javadov
10	MF	PAR	César Meza
14	FW	JAM	Andre Clennon (from (Finland) VPS)
19	MF	ARG	Pablo Podio (loan from (Czech Republic) Fastav Zlín)
21	MF	CMR	Hervé Tchami (from (Saudi Arabia) Hajer)
22	MF	AZE	Magsad Isayev (from (Azerbaijan) Neftchi Baku)
40	MF	SRB	Nemanja Stojanović (loan from (Austria) Karabakh Wien)
90	MF	GAM	Ebrima Sohna (from (Finland) VPS)

Out: Note: Flags indicate national team as defined under FIFA eligibility rules; some limited exceptions apply. Players may hold more than one non-FIFA nationality.

No.	Pos.	Nation	Player
6	MF	AZE	Samir Zargarov (to (Azerbaijan) Kapaz)
7	MF	AZE	Mirsahib Abbasov (loan to (Azerbaijan) Zira)
8	MF	AZE	Nizami Hajiyev
10	MF	AZE	Elnur Abdullayev (to (Azerbaijan) Sumgayit)
19	MF	AZE	Mirhüseyn Seyidov
22	DF	AZE	Ilkin Qirtimov (to (Azerbaijan) Neftchi Baku)
99	DF	AZE	Rijat Garayev (loan to (Azerbaijan) Sabah)

Trial: Note: Flags indicate national team as defined under FIFA eligibility rules; some limited exceptions apply. Players may hold more than one non-FIFA nationality.

No.	Pos.	Nation	Player
—	DF	AZE	Ruslan Jafarov
—	MF	AZE	Seymur Asadov
—	MF	CMR	Hervé Tchami
—	MF	SRB	Nemanja Stojanovic
—	FW	AZE	Magomed Kurbanov

== Friendlies ==
13 June 2017	Inter Baku (Azerbaijan)	0 – 2	(Azerbaijan) Zira	Bolu, Turkey
16:30 AZT (UTC+4)	Đurić; O.Aliyev	Report

17 June 2017	Viitorul Constanța (Romania)	2 – 2	(Azerbaijan) Inter Baku	Bolu, Turkey
AZT (UTC+4)	Goal	Report	Aliyev 24' (pen.); S.Zargarov

January 2018	Inter Baku (Azerbaijan)	3 – 1	(Azerbaijan) Qaradağ Lökbatan	Baku
AZT (UTC+4)	Fardjad-Azad 41'; A.Mammadli 65' (pen.); M.Isayev 87'	Report	Mustafayev 60'	Stadium: Ismet Gaibov Stadium

14 January 2018	Keşla (Azerbaijan)	2 – 1	(Azerbaijan) Neftchi Baku	Baku
AZT (UTC+4)	M.Isayev 75'; Fardjad-Azad 77'	Report	M.Abbasov (1st half)	Stadium: Ismet Gaibov Stadium

19 January 2018	Keşla (Azerbaijan)	2 – 1	(Azerbaijan) Zira	Baku
AZT (UTC+4)	S.Akkoyun 67'; A.Mammadli 82'	Report	Gadze 86'	Stadium: Ismet Gaibov Stadium

26 January 2018	Keşla (Azerbaijan)	1 – 0	(North Macedonia) Rabotnički	Antalya, Turkey
AZT (UTC+4)	Scarlatache	Report

29 January 2018	Keşla (Azerbaijan)	1 – 2	(Ukraine) Karpaty Lviv	Antalya, Turkey
AZT (UTC+4)	A.Mammadli	Report	Goal

1 February 2018	Keşla (Azerbaijan)	1 – 1	(Russia) Yenisey Krasnoyarsk	Antalya, Turkey
AZT (UTC+4)	S.Alkhasov	Report	Goal

== Competitions ==
=== Azerbaijan Premier League ===
==== Results summary ====
Overall								Home						Away					
Pld	W	D	L	GF	GA	GD	Pts	W	D	L	GF	GA	GD	W	D	L	GF	GA	GD
28	8	8	12	29	39	−10	32	5	3	6	16	18	−2	3	5	6	13	21	−8

Last updated: 20 May 2018.
Source: See Results

==== Results ====
12 August 2017 1	Inter Baku	1 – 2	Gabala	Baku
20:00 AZT (UTC+4)	Seyidov (yellow card) 31'; Fardjad-Azad 71'; S.Zargarov (yellow card) 78'	Report	E.Mammadov 13' (yellow card) 61'; Ozobić 23' (pen.) (yellow card) 90+2'; Joseph-Monrose (yellow card) 41'	Stadium: Inter Arena; Attendance: 500; Referee: Omar Paşayev

19 August 2017 2	Qarabağ	1 – 0	Inter Baku	Baku
20:00 AZT (UTC+4)	Dashdemirov (yellow card) 31'; Yunuszade (yellow card) 82'; Ismayilov 89'	Report		Stadium: Azersun Arena; Attendance: 1,600; Referee: Rauf Jabbarov

25 August 2017 3	Inter Baku	1 – 0	Səbail	Baku
18:00 AZT (UTC+4)	Hajiyev 4'; Qirtimov (yellow card) 34'; Guliyev (yellow card) 50' (yellow-red card) 63'; S.Zargarov (yellow card) 88'	Report	N.Novruzov (yellow card) 34'; P.Garakhanov (yellow card) 68'	Stadium: Inter Arena; Attendance: 1,000; Referee: Ingilab Məmmədov

9 September 2017 4	Inter Baku	3 – 2	Kapaz	Baku
17:00 AZT (UTC+4)	F.Bayramov 5'; Scarlatache 21'; A.Guluzadeh 33'; S.Zargarov (yellow card) 76'; O.Sadigli (yellow card) 90+4'; Qirtimov (yellow card) 90+5'	Report	S.Aliyev 34' (yellow card) 74'; K.Diniyev 37'; N.Mammadov (yellow card) 39'	Stadium: Inter Arena; Attendance: 800; Referee: Aliyar Ağayev

16 September 2017 5	Inter Baku	1 – 1	Sumgayit	Baku
16:30 AZT (UTC+4)	S.Tashkin 11'; S.Alkhasov (yellow card) 79'	Report	Eyyubov 48'; V.Beybalayev (yellow card) 76'	Stadium: Inter Arena; Attendance: 500; Referee: Ramil Diniyev

23 September 2017 6	Zira	1 – 1	Inter Baku	Zirə
20:00 AZT (UTC+4)	Khalilzade (yellow card) 38'; Krneta 67' (yellow card) 80'; N.Gurbanov (yellow card) 87'; Gadze (yellow card) 90+5'	Report	S.Tashkin 21'; Qirtimov (yellow card) 25' (yellow-red card) 43'; Hajiyev (yellow card) 47'; Denis (yellow card) 90+5'	Stadium: Zira Olympic Sport Complex Stadium; Attendance: 1,200; Referee: Ingilab Məmmədov

29 September 2017 7	Inter Baku	0 – 2	Neftchi Baku	Baku
16:00 AZT (UTC+4)	S.Tashkin (yellow card) 54'; M.Abbasov (yellow card) 90+2'	Report	Meza 60'; Hajiyev 72'; Petrov (yellow card) 90+2'	Stadium: Inter Arena; Attendance: 3,500; Referee: Omar Paşayev

13 October 2017 8	Inter Baku	0 – 2	Qarabağ	Baku
15:30 AZT (UTC+4)	E.Abdullayev (yellow card) 47'; M.Guliyev (yellow card) 84'	Report	Ndlovu 85', 90+2'	Stadium: Inter Arena; Attendance: 1,070; Referee: Aliyar Ağayev

20 October 2017 9	Səbail	1 – 0	Inter Baku	Baku
18:00 AZT (UTC+4)	M.Abakarov 16'; Maudo (yellow card) 90+3'; E.Yagublu (yellow card) 90+3'	Report	F.Bayramov (yellow card) 90+2'	Stadium: Dalga Arena; Attendance: 250; Referee: Ramil Diniyev

28 October 2017 10	Keşla	0 – 2	Kapaz	Baku
15:00 AZT (UTC+4)	F.Bayramov (yellow card) 87'; Fardjad-Azad (yellow card) 90+3'	Report	M.Gayaly 15' (o.g.); I.Safarzade 65'; Chernyshev (yellow card) 67'; J.Javadov (yellow card) 90+3'	Stadium: Inter Arena; Attendance: 4,000; Referee: Orkhan Məmmədov
Note: On 28 October 2017, Inter Baku changed their name to Keşla FK.

4 November 2017 11	Sumgayit	3 – 1	Keşla	Sumqayit
18:00 AZT (UTC+4)	Denis 30' (o.g.); Yunanov 52'; E.Shahverdiyev (yellow card) 58'; Scarlatache 70' (o.g.)	Report	F.Bayramov (yellow card) 40'; Hajiyev 45'; Scarlatache (yellow card) 80'	Stadium: Kapital Bank Arena; Attendance: 1,200; Referee: Aliyar Ağayev

18 November 2017 12	Keşla	0 – 1	Zira	Baku
13:00 AZT (UTC+4)	Qirtimov (yellow card) 56'	Report	Đurić 18'; V.Igbekoyi (yellow card) 42'	Stadium: Inter Arena; Attendance: 1,750; Referee: Ramil Diniyev

25 November 2017 13	Neftchi Baku	3 – 1	Keşla	Baku
17:00 AZT (UTC+4)	M.Abbasov 34'; Herrera 51'; Abışov 89'	Report	Scarlatache 69'	Stadium: Bakcell Arena; Attendance: 600; Referee: Rauf Jabbarov

3 December 2017 14	Gabala	3 – 0	Keşla	Qabala
16:00 AZT (UTC+4)	Dabo 24'; Ozobić 51', 56'; Ehiosun (yellow card) 88'	Report	Fardjad-Azad (yellow card) 30'	Stadium: Gabala City Stadium; Attendance: 300; Referee: Ingilab Məmmədov

11 February 2018 15	Keşla	1 – 1	Səbail	Baku
15:00 AZT (UTC+4)	Fardjad-Azad 55'	Report	Tagaýew (yellow card) 32'; F.Muradbayli 35'; T.Tsetskhladze (yellow card) 44'	Stadium: Inter Arena; Attendance: 1,500; Referee: Ramil Diniyev

18 February 2018 16	Kapaz	0 – 1	Keşla	Ganja
15:00 AZT (UTC+4)	Souza (yellow card) 27'; Mandzhgaladze (yellow card) 81'	Report	F.Bayramov 51'	Stadium: Ganja City Stadium; Attendance: 1,150; Referee: Ravan Həmzəzadə

25 February 2018 17	Keşla	1 – 2	Sumgayit	Baku
15:00 AZT (UTC+4)	Malikov 12' (o.g.); Scarlatache (yellow card) 38'; F.Bayramov (yellow card) 70'	Report	T.Akhundov 2' (pen.); Imamverdiyev (yellow card) 45'; K.Najafov (yellow card) 55'; Eyyubov 90'	Stadium: Inter Arena; Attendance: 2,000; Referee: Rahim Həsənov

4 March 2018 18	Zira	1 – 2	Keşla	Zirə
18:00 AZT (UTC+4)	Đurić (yellow card) 25'; E.Abdullayev 30'	Report	Guliyev 14'; S.Alkhasov 74'; Denis (yellow card) 90+4'	Stadium: Zira Olympic Sport Complex Stadium; Attendance: 800; Referee: Aliyar Ağayev

9 March 2018 19	Neftchi Baku	3 – 2	Keşla	Baku
18:00 AZT (UTC+4)	Alaskarov 14'; Mahmudov (yellow card) 24'; Herrera 48'; Abışov 90'	Report	Sohna (yellow card) 10'; Scarlatache 16'; Fardjad-Azad 57'	Stadium: Bakcell Arena; Attendance: 800; Referee: Ramil Diniyev

13 March 2018 20	Keşla	1 – 1	Gabala	Baku
15:30 AZT (UTC+4)	F.Bayramov (yellow card) 38'; Stanković 59' (o.g.); Fardjad-Azad (yellow card) 75'	Report	Dabo 32'; G.Aliyev (yellow card) 40'; E.Jamalov (yellow card) 59'; Malone (yellow card) 81'	Stadium: Inter Arena; Attendance: 500; Referee: Omar Paşayev

1 April 2018 21	Qarabağ	1 – 1	Keşla	Baku
18:30 AZT (UTC+4)	Sadygov (yellow card) 45+3'; Richard 57'; Diniyev (red card) 60'	Report	S.Alkhasov 34'; F.Bayramov (yellow card) 50'; Meza (red card) 60'; Fardjad-Azad (yellow card) 75'; O.Sadigli (yellow card) 79'	Stadium: Azersun Arena; Attendance: 1,200; Referee: Orkahn Məmmədov

7 April 2018 22	Kapaz	1 – 1	Keşla	Ganja
15:00 AZT (UTC+4)	S.Zargarov (yellow card) 20'; Dário 45'; S.Rahimov (yellow card) 60'	Report	Javadov 26'; S.Alkhasov (yellow card) 34'; Clennon (yellow card) 45'; F.Bayramov (yellow card) 51'; Scarlatache (yellow card) 65'; Denis (yellow card) 70'; M.Guliyev (yellow card) 90+1'	Stadium: Ganja City Stadium; Attendance: 5,000; Referee: Ingilab Məmmədov

15 April 2018 23	Sumgayit	2 – 1	Keşla	Sumqayit
18:00 AZT (UTC+4)	B.Mustafazade 58'; T.Akhundov (yellow card) 70'; E.Shahverdiyev 84'	Report	Podio (yellow card) 61'; M.Isayev 69' (yellow card) 80' (yellow-red card) 81'; M.Guliyev (yellow card) 73'; Fardjad-Azad (yellow card) 76'	Stadium: Kapital Bank Arena; Attendance: 2,500; Referee: Rauf Jabbarov

21 April 2018 24	Keşla	2 – 1	Zira	Baku
16:00 AZT (UTC+4)	O.Sadigli (yellow card) 45'; Clennon 50' (yellow card) 90+2'; Javadov 69'	Report	Đurić (yellow card) 16' (goal) 36' (pen.); Naghiyev (yellow card) 81'	Stadium: Inter Arena; Attendance: 1,000; Referee: Orkhan Məmmədov

28 April 2018 25	Keşla	2 – 1	Neftchi Baku	Baku
16:00 AZT (UTC+4)	Javadov 22'; Meza (yellow card) 28'; N.Stojanovic (yellow card) 76'; Scarlatache 68'; Guliyev (yellow card) 90+1'	Report	Alaskarov 42'; Abışov (yellow card) 40'	Stadium: Inter Arena; Attendance: 1,000; Referee: Rahim Həsənov

5 May 2018 26	Gabala	1 – 1	Keşla	Qabala
19:00 AZT (UTC+4)	Joseph-Monrose 30'; Ramaldanov (yellow card) 43'	Report	S.Alkhasov 10'; A.Mammadli (yellow card) 24'; Javadov (yellow card) 61'; F.Bayramov (yellow card) 67'; Guliyev (yellow card) 83'	Stadium: Gabala City Stadium; Attendance: 800; Referee: Ravan Həmzəzadə

12 May 2018 27	Keşla	3 – 0	Qarabağ	Baku
17:00 AZT (UTC+4)	Clennon 4' (yellow card) 40'; Fardjad-Azad 8'; S.Alkhasov 16'; N.Stojanovic (yellow card) 51'; A.Mammadli (yellow card) 85'	Report	Guerrier (yellow card) 75'	Stadium: Inter Arena; Attendance: 2,00; Referee: Raad Ahmədov

20 May 2018 28	Səbail	0 – 1	Keşla	Baku
17:15 AZT (UTC+4)	N.Apakidze (yellow card) 70'	Report	Fardjad-Azad (yellow card) 23'; Scarlatache (yellow card) 54'; M.Guliyev 63'; Javadov (yellow card) 69'	Stadium: Bayil Arena; Attendance: 300; Referee: Vugar Həsənli

==== League table ====
Pos	Team	Pld	W	D	L	GF	GA	GD	Pts	Qualification or relegation
4	Zira	28	12	8	8	36	30	+6	44	
5	Sumgayit	28	11	7	10	34	33	+1	40	
6	Keşla	28	8	7	13	29	39	−10	31	Qualification for the Europa League first qualifying round (Note: Keşla qualified for the Europa League first qualifying round by winning 2017–18 Azerbaijan Cup.)
7	Səbail	28	6	5	17	19	39	−20	23	
8	Kapaz (R)	28	3	5	20	18	47	−29	14	Relegation to the Azerbaijan First Division

Source: UEFA, Soccerway
Rules for classification: 1) Points; 2) Head-to-head points; 3) Head-to-head goal difference; 4) Head-to-head goals scored; 5) Head-to-head away goals scored (only if two teams); 6) Goal difference; 7) Goals scored.
(R) Relegated

=== Azerbaijan Cup ===
29 November 2017 Second Round	MOIK Baku	0 – 3	Keşla	Baku
13:30 AZT (UTC+4)	J.Hacıyev (yellow card) 41'	Report	Scarlatache 41'; Fardjad-Azad (yellow card) 43'; M.Abbasov 65'; M.Gayaly (yellow card) 79'; R.Maharramli 80'	Stadium: FC Baku Training Base; Attendance: 200; Referee: Ravan Həmzəzadə

10 December 2017 Quarterfinal 1st leg	Keşla	2 – 0	Kapaz	Baku
14:00 AZT (UTC+4)	Fardjad-Azad 18'; R.Məhərrəmli 41'; Guliyev (yellow card) 58'; Scarlatache (yellow card) 62'; S.Alkhasov (yellow card) 62'; M.Abbasov (yellow card) 69'; F.Bayramov (yellow card) 81'	Report	Jalilov (yellow card) 39'; I.Safarzade (yellow card) 90+2'	Stadium: Inter Arena; Attendance: 1,000; Referee: Rauf Jabbarov

14 December 2017 Quarterfinal 2nd leg	Kapaz	2 – 3 (2 – 5 agg.)	Keşla	Ganja
13:00 AZT (UTC+4)	I.Sadigov (yellow card) 36'; S.Rahimov 48' (yellow card) 90+4'; S.Diallo (yellow card) 68'; K.Abdullazade 80'	Report	M.Abbasov 34', 85'; Fardjad-Azad 82'; E.Aliyev (yellow card) 90+1'	Stadium: Ganja City Stadium; Attendance: 700; Referee: Orkhan Mammadov

11 April 2018 Semifinal 1st leg	Keşla	1 – 0	Sumgayit	Baku
16:00 AZT (UTC+4)	Javadov (yellow card) 58'; Meza 90+2'	Report	V.Beybalayev (yellow card) 20'; E.Shahverdiyev (yellow card) 85'	Stadium: Inter Arena; Attendance: 800; Referee: Rahim Həsənov

18 April 2018 Semifinal 2nd leg	Sumgayit	1 – 1 (1 – 2 agg.)	Keşla	Sumqayit
17:00 AZT (UTC+4)	Imamverdiyev 64'; B.Hasanalizade (yellow card) 72'; V.Beybalayev (yellow card) 81'	Report	Sohna (yellow card) 50'; Meza 61'; F.Bayramov (yellow card) 65'	Stadium: Kapital Bank Arena; Attendance: 1,300; Referee: Aliyar Ağayev

==== Final ====
28 May 2018	Gabala	0 – 1	Keşla	Qabala
20:00 AZT (UTC+4)	Guliyev (yellow card) 7'; Sohna (yellow card) 17'; Fardjad-Azad 71' (yellow card) 90+5'; O.Sadigli (yellow card) 88'; Aghayev (yellow card) 90+1'	Report	Joseph-Monrose (yellow card) 4'; Koné (yellow card) 77'; Gurbanov (red card) 88'	Stadium: Gabala City Stadium; Attendance: 4,500; Referee: Rauf Jabbarov

=== UEFA Europa League ===
==== Qualifying rounds ====
29 June 2017 First qualifying round 1st leg	Mladost Lučani (Serbia)	0 – 3	(Azerbaijan) Inter Baku	Lučani, Serbia
12:30 AZT (UTC+4)	Milošević (yellow card) 21'; Pejović (yellow card) 35'; Tumbasević (yellow card) 65'; Šatara (yellow card) 78'	Report	Scarlatache 23', 41' (yellow card) 76'; E.Abdullayev (yellow card) 37'; R.Aliyev 75'	Stadium: Mladost Stadium; Attendance: 1,950; Referee: Aleksei Matyunin (Russia)

6 July 2017 First qualifying round 2nd leg	Inter Baku (Azerbaijan)	2 – 0 (5 – 0 agg.)	(Serbia) Mladost Lučani	Baku, Azerbaijan
21:00 AZT (UTC+4)	Denis 23'; Hajiyev 74'	Report	Pejović (yellow card) 21' (yellow-red card) 45+3'	Stadium: Dalga Arena (Note: Inter Baku play their home matches at Dalga Arena, Baku, instead of their regular stadium Inter Arena, Baku.); Attendance: 3,150; Referee: Mykola Balakin (Ukraine)

12 July 2017 Second qualifying round 1st leg	Inter Baku (Azerbaijan)	1 – 0	(Luxembourg) Fola Esch	Baku, Azerbaijan
20:00 AZT (UTC+4)	Denis (yellow card) 54'; F.Bayramov (yellow card) 64'; Hajiyev (yellow card) 84'; Seyidov 89'; Aliyev (yellow card) 90+5'	Report	Chrappan (yellow card) 7'; M.Kirch (yellow card) 54'; Hadji (yellow card) 90+5'	Stadium: Dalga Arena; Attendance: 2,500; Referee: Eitan Shmuelevitz (Israel)

20 July 2017 Second qualifying round 2nd leg	Fola Esch (Luxembourg)	4 – 1 (4 – 2 agg.)	(Azerbaijan) Inter Baku	Esch-sur-Alzette, Luxembourg
21:30 AZT (UTC+4)	Hadji 21'; Saiti 32' (yellow card) 53'; Laterza 59' (yellow card) 90+2'; Sacras 90+4'; Dallevedove (yellow card) 90+4'; E.Cabral (yellow card) 90+4'	Report	S.Alkhasov (yellow card) 33'; Guliyev (yellow card) 33'; Fardjad-Azad 70'	Stadium: Stade Émile Mayrisch; Attendance: 1,250; Referee: Donatas Rumšas (Lithuania)

== Squad statistics ==
As of Match played 28 May 2018

=== Appearances and goals ===
No.	Pos	Nat	Player	Total		Premier League		Azerbaijan Cup		Europa League	
No.	Pos	Nat	Player	Apps	Goals	Apps	Goals	Apps	Goals	Apps	Goals
1	GK	(Azerbaijan) AZE	Kamran Aghayev	11	0	9	0	2	0	0	0
2	DF	(Azerbaijan) AZE	Sertan Tashkin	25	2	15+5	2	4	0	0+1	0
3	DF	(Brazil) BRA	Denis Silva	37	1	26+1	0	6	0	4	1
4	DF	(Azerbaijan) AZE	Slavik Alkhasov	38	4	20+8	4	6	0	4	0
7	FW	(Azerbaijan) AZE	Vagif Javadov	12	3	6+3	3	3	0	0	0
9	FW	(Azerbaijan) AZE	Pardis Fardjad-Azad	35	8	20+5	4	5+1	3	3+1	1
10	MF	(Paraguay) PAR	César Meza	14	2	10+1	0	3	2	0	0
14	FW	(Jamaica) JAM	Andre Clennon	12	2	10+1	2	1	0	0	0
15	GK	(Azerbaijan) AZE	Orkhan Sadigli	25	0	19+2	0	4	0	0	0
19	MF	(Argentina) ARG	Pablo Podio	2	0	2	0	0	0	0	0
20	MF	(Azerbaijan) AZE	Akshin Guluzadeh	4	1	4	1	0	0	0	0
21	MF	(Cameroon) CMR	Hervé Tchami	13	0	9+2	0	0+2	0	0	0
22	MF	(Azerbaijan) AZE	Magsad Isayev	6	1	3+3	1	0	0	0	0
24	MF	(Azerbaijan) AZE	Fuad Bayramov	28	2	17+4	2	2+1	0	4	0
27	DF	(Romania) ROU	Adrian Scarlatache	37	7	27	4	6	1	4	2
33	DF	(Azerbaijan) AZE	Tarlan Guliyev	30	1	21	1	5	0	4	0
39	MF	(Azerbaijan) AZE	Əlibəy Məmmədli	12	0	3+6	0	0+3	0	0	0
40	MF	(Serbia) SRB	Nemanja Stojanovic	11	0	6+2	0	1+2	0	0	0
46	MF	(Azerbaijan) AZE	Asad Masimov	2	0	0+2	0	0	0	0	0
53	DF	(Azerbaijan) AZE	Emil Əliyev	1	0	0	0	0+1	0	0	0
56	MF	(Azerbaijan) AZE	Urfan Ismayilov	1	0	0	0	0+1	0	0	0
58	DF	(Azerbaijan) AZE	Sinan Akkoyun	1	0	1	0	0	0	0	0
65	MF	(Azerbaijan) AZE	Jaber Amirli	7	0	6+1	0	0	0	0	0
66	DF	(Azerbaijan) AZE	Murad Gayaly	6	0	2+2	0	1+1	0	0	0
77	MF	(Azerbaijan) AZE	Oleq Hüseynov	2	0	0+1	0	0+1	0	0	0
80	MF	(Azerbaijan) AZE	Rafael Məhərrəmli	7	2	0+4	0	3	2	0	0
81	MF	(Azerbaijan) AZE	Elvin Cəfərquliyev	1	0	0	0	0+1	0	0	0
88	MF	(Azerbaijan) AZE	Mammad Guliyev	24	1	7+12	1	3+2	0	0	0
90	MF	(The Gambia) GAM	Ebrima Sohna	14	0	11	0	3	0	0	0
Players away on loan:
7	MF	(Azerbaijan) AZE	Mirsahib Abbasov	18	3	8+4	0	3	3	1+2	0
Players who left Inter Baku during the season:
1	GK	(Azerbaijan) AZE	Salahat Aghayev	4	0	0	0	0	0	4	0
6	MF	(Azerbaijan) AZE	Samir Zargarov	17	0	6+5	0	2	0	0+4	0
8	MF	(Azerbaijan) AZE	Nizami Hajiyev	12	3	7+1	2	0	0	4	1
10	MF	(Azerbaijan) AZE	Elnur Abdullayev	16	0	11+1	0	0	0	4	0
11	FW	(Azerbaijan) AZE	Rauf Aliyev	4	1	0	0	0	0	4	1
19	MF	(Azerbaijan) AZE	Mirhüseyn Seyidov	15	1	9+2	0	0	0	0+4	1
22	DF	(Azerbaijan) AZE	Ilkin Qirtimov	20	0	13	0	3	0	4	0
40	MF	(Azerbaijan) AZE	Asif Vəliyev	1	0	0	0	0+1	0	0	0

=== Goal scorers ===
Place	Position	Nation	Number	Name	Premier League	Azerbaijan Cup	Europa League	Total
1	FW	(Azerbaijan)	9	Pardis Fardjad-Azad	4	3	1	8
2	MF	(Romania)	27	Adrian Scarlatache	4	1	2	7
3	DF	(Azerbaijan)	4	Slavik Alkhasov	4	0	0	4
4	FW	(Azerbaijan)	7	Vagif Javadov	3	0	0	3
4	MF	(Azerbaijan)	8	Nizami Hajiyev	2	0	1	3
4	MF	(Azerbaijan)	7	Mirsahib Abbasov	0	1	0	3
7	DF	(Azerbaijan)	2	Sertan Tashkin	2	0	0	2
7	MF	(Azerbaijan)	24	Fuad Bayramov	2	0	0	2
7	FW	(Jamaica)	14	Andre Clennon	2	0	0	2
7	MF	(Azerbaijan)	80	Rafael Məhərrəmli	0	2	0	2
7	MF	(Paraguay)	10	César Meza	0	2	0	2
10	MF	(Azerbaijan)	20	Akshin Guluzadeh	1	0	0	1
10	DF	(Azerbaijan)	33	Tarlan Guliyev	1	0	0	1
10	MF	(Azerbaijan)	22	Magsad Isayev	1	0	0	1
10	MF	(Azerbaijan)	88	Mammad Guliyev	1	0	0	1
10	FW	(Azerbaijan)	11	Rauf Aliyev	0	0	1	1
10	DF	(Brazil)	3	Denis Silva	0	0	1	1
10	MF	(Azerbaijan)	19	Mirhüseyn Seyidov	0	0	1	1
10				Own goal	1	0	0	1
				TOTALS	28	11	7	46

=== Disciplinary record ===
Number	Nation	Position	Name	Premier League		Azerbaijan Cup		Europa League		Total	
Number	Nation	Position	Name	Yellow card	Red card	Yellow card	Red card	Yellow card	Red card	Yellow card	Red card
1	(Azerbaijan)	GK	Orkhan Sadigli	1	0	1	0	0	0	2	0
2	(Azerbaijan)	DF	Sertan Tashkin	1	0	0	0	0	0	1	0
3	(Brazil)	DF	Denis Silva	3	0	0	0	1	0	4	0
4	(Azerbaijan)	DF	Slavik Alkhasov	2	0	1	0	1	0	4	0
7	(Azerbaijan)	FW	Vagif Javadov	2	0	1	0	0	0	3	0
9	(Azerbaijan)	FW	Pardis Fardjad-Azad	6	0	2	0	1	0	9	0
10	(Paraguay)	MF	César Meza	1	1	0	0	0	0	1	1
14	(Jamaica)	FW	Andre Clennon	3	0	0	0	0	0	3	0
15	(Azerbaijan)	GK	Orkhan Sadigli	2	0	1	0	0	0	3	0
19	(Argentina)	MF	Pablo Podio	1	0	0	0	0	0	1	0
22	(Azerbaijan)	DF	Magsad Isayev	2	1	0	0	0	0	2	1
24	(Azerbaijan)	MF	Fuad Bayramov	8	0	2	0	1	0	11	0
27	(Romania)	DF	Adrian Scarlatache	4	0	1	0	1	0	6	0
33	(Azerbaijan)	DF	Tarlan Guliyev	4	1	2	0	1	0	7	1
39	(Azerbaijan)	MF	Əlibəy Məmmədli	2	0	0	0	0	0	2	0
40	(Serbia)	MF	Nemanja Stojanovic	1	0	1	0	0	0	2	0
53	(Azerbaijan)	DF	Emil Əliyev	0	0	1	0	0	0	1	0
66	(Azerbaijan)	DF	Murad Gayaly	1	0	0	0	0	0	1	0
88	(Azerbaijan)	MF	Mammad Guliyev	3	0	0	0	0	0	3	0
90	(The Gambia)	MF	Ebrima Sohna	1	0	1	0	0	0	2	0
Players away on loan:
7	(Azerbaijan)	MF	Mirsahib Abbasov	1	0	1	0	0	0	2	0
Players who left Keşla during the season:
6	(Azerbaijan)	MF	Samir Zargarov	3	0	0	0	0	0	3	0
8	(Azerbaijan)	MF	Nizami Hajiyev	1	0	0	0	1	0	2	0
10	(Azerbaijan)	MF	Elnur Abdullayev	1	0	0	0	1	0	2	0
11	(Azerbaijan)	FW	Rauf Aliyev	0	0	0	0	1	0	1	0
19	(Azerbaijan)	MF	Mirhüseyn Seyidov	1	0	0	0	0	0	1	0
22	(Azerbaijan)	DF	Ilkin Qirtimov	5	1	0	0	0	0	5	1
			TOTALS	60	4	15	0	8	0	83	4
