= Edvinas Girdvainis =

Lithuanian footballer (born 1993)

Personal information
- Date of birth: 17 January 1993 (age 33)
- Place of birth: Klaipėda, Lithuania
- Height: 1.88 m (6 ft 2 in)
- Position: Centre-back

Team information
- Current team: Liepāja
- Number: 2

Youth career
- FBK Kaunas
- 2010–2012: Padova

Senior career*
Years	Team	Apps	(Gls)
2012–2014	Ekranas Panevėžys	44	(0)
2014–2016	Marbella	59	(0)
2016–2018	Piast Gliwice	10	(0)
2017–2018	→ Tom Tomsk (loan)	22	(0)
2018	Hapoel Tel Aviv	0	(0)
2018–2019	Keşla	18	(1)
2019	RFS	14	(0)
2020–2021	KFC Uerdingen 05	32	(1)
2021–2023	Kauno Žalgiris	74	(10)
2023–2024	SV Sandhausen	26	(0)
2025–	Liepāja	11	(0)

International career^{‡}
2010–2011	Lithuania U19	10	(0)
2012–2014	Lithuania U21	14	(0)
2016–	Lithuania	62	(2)
- * Club domestic league appearances and goals as of 17 November 2025 ‡ National team caps and goals as of 18:35, 13 October 2025 (UTC)

Edvinas Girdvainis (born 17 January 1993) is a Lithuanian professional footballer who plays as a centre-back for Latvian club Liepāja and the Lithuania national team.

== Club career ==
On 28 June 2016, Girdvainis signed a three-year contract with one of the top Poland clubs Piast Gliwice. On 21 July 2017, he was loaned for one season to Russian club Tom Tomsk.

On 18 August 2018, Girdvainis signed a one-year contract with Keşla FK.

He signed for 3. Liga side SV Sandhausen in December 2023.

== International career ==
Girdvainis debuted for the Lithuania national team against Romania on 23 March 2016.

== Career statistics ==
=== Club ===
As of match played 3 October 2025

Appearances and goals by club, season and competition
Club	Season	League			National cup (Note: Includes Lithuanian Cup, Russian Cup, Azerbaijan Cup, Latvian Cup, DFB-Pokal)		Continental		Other		Total	
Club	Season	Division	Apps	Goals	Apps	Goals	Apps	Goals	Apps	Goals	Apps	Goals
Ekranas Panevėžys	2012	A Lyga	4	0	1	0	3 (Note: One appearance in UEFA Champions League, two appearances in UEFA Europa League)	0	—		8	0
Ekranas Panevėžys	2013	A Lyga	24	0	3	0	2 (Note: Appearances in UEFA Champions League)	0	1 (Note: Appearance in Lithuanian Supercup)	0	30	0
Ekranas Panevėžys	2014	A Lyga	16	0	—		2 (Note: Appearance(s) in UEFA Europa League)	0	—		18	0
Ekranas Panevėžys	Total		44	0	4	0	7	0	1	0	56	0
Marbella	2014–15	Segunda División B	28	0	—		—		—		28	0
Marbella	2015–16	Segunda División B	31	0	—		—		—		31	0
Marbella	Total		59	0	—		—		—		59	0
Piast Gliwice	2016–17	Ekstraklasa	10	0	—		1	0	—		11	0
Piast Gliwice	2017–18	Ekstraklasa	0	0	—		—		—		0	0
Piast Gliwice	Toal		10	0	—		1	0	—		11	0
Tom Tomsk (loan)	2017–18	Russian First League	22	0	3	0	—		—		25	0
Hapoel Tel Aviv	2018–19	Israeli Premier League	—		0	0	—		3 (Note: Appearances in Toto Cup)	0	3	0
Keşla	2018–19	Azerbaijan Premier League	18	1	1	0	—		—		19	1
RFS	2019	Virslīga	14	0	3	0	2	0	—		19	0
KFC Uerdingen 05	2019–20	3. Liga	12	1	—		—		—		12	1
KFC Uerdingen 05	2020–21	3. Liga	20	0	—		—		—		20	0
KFC Uerdingen 05	Total		32	1	—		—		—		32	1
Kauno Žalgiris	2021	A Lyga	11	0	—		—		—		11	0
Kauno Žalgiris	2022	A Lyga	30	2	4	0	2 (Note: Appearances in UEFA Europa Conference League)	0	—		36	2
Kauno Žalgiris	2023	A Lyga	33	10	4	0	2	0	1	0	40	10
Kauno Žalgiris	Total		74	12	8	0	4	0	1	0	87	12
SV Sandhausen	2023–24	3. Liga	6	0	—		—		—		6	0
SV Sandhausen	2024–25	3. Liga	20	0	1	0	—		1 (Note: Appearance in Baden Cup)	1	22	1
SV Sandhausen	Total		26	0	1	0	—		1	1	28	1
Liepāja	2025	Virslīga	8	0	2	0	—		—		10	0
Career total			307	14	22	0	14	0	6	1	349	15

=== International ===
As of match played 12 October 2025

Appearances and goals by national team and year
National team	Year	Apps	Goals
Lithuania
Lithuania	2016	7	0
Lithuania	2017	3	0
Lithuania	2018	6	0
Lithuania	2019	6	0
Lithuania	2020	8	0
Lithuania	2021	5	0
Lithuania	2022	5	0
Lithuania	2023	8	1
Lithuania	2024	8	0
Lithuania	2025	6	1
Total		62	2

Scores and results list Poland's goal tally first, score column indicates score after each Girdvainis goal.

List of international goals scored by Edvinas Girdvainis
No.	Date	Venue	Opponent	Score	Result	Competition
1	17 June 2023	Darius and Girėnas Stadium, Kaunas, Lithuania	Bulgaria	1–0	1–1	UEFA Euro 2024 qualifying
2	7 September 2024	Darius and Girėnas Stadium, Kaunas, Lithuania	Netherlands	2–2	2–3	2026 FIFA World Cup qualification
