= Georgios Georgiadis (footballer, born 1987) =

Greek footballer

Personal information
- Full name: Georgios Georgiadis
- Date of birth: 14 November 1987 (age 38)
- Place of birth: Mitrousi, Serres, Greece
- Height: 1.78 m (5 ft 10 in)
- Position: Winger

Youth career
- 1995–2005: PAOK

Senior career*
Years	Team	Apps	(Gls)
2007–2011	Panserraikos	145	(26)
2011–2014	PAOK	51	(4)
2014–2016	Veria	33	(0)
2016–2017	AEL Limassol	28	(0)
2017–2018	Ermis Aradippou	6	(1)
2018	Doxa Drama	10	(1)
2018–2019	Keşla	7	(1)
2019	Elazığspor	1	(0)
2019–2021	Panserraikos	9	(3)
2021–2023	Apollon Paralimnio	0	(0)
2023–2024	Iraklis Ammoudia	10	(10)

International career
2010–2011	Greece	3	(0)

Managerial career
- 2024–2025: Pontioi Cheimarros B΄ (technical director)
- * Club domestic league appearances and goals as of 10 February 2019

Georgios Georgiadis (Greek: Γεώργιος Γεωργιάδης; born 14 November 1987) is a Greek former professional footballer and manager.

== Club career ==
=== PAOK ===
Georgiadis made his debut for the club on 4 August 2011 in a Europa League qualifier against Vålerenga in which PAOK won 3–0. Georgiadis scored his first league goal for PAOK against AEK Athens on 29 January 2012 in a 2–0 away win. On 30 November 2011, he set up both goals for Dimitris Salpingidis and Stefanos Athanasiadis in the famous 2–1 win over Tottenham Hotspur at White Hart Lane.

=== Veria ===
On 19 August 2014 Georgiadis signed a contract with the Greek team Veria.

=== AEL Limassol ===
On 23 August 2016, Georgiadis signed with Cypriot First Division club AEL Limassol a year contract for an undisclosed fee.

=== Ermis Aradippou ===
On 31 August 2017, Georgiadis signed with Cypriot First Division club Ermis Aradippou a year contract for an undisclosed fee.

=== Doxa Drama ===
On 31 January 2018, he signed with Football League club Doxa Drama.

=== Keşla ===
On 12 September 2018, he signed with Azerbaijani football club Keşla FK that currently plays in the Azerbaijan Premier League.

=== Elazığspor ===
On the last day of the January transfer market 2019, Georgiadis was one of 22 players on two hours, that signed for Turkish club Elazığspor. had been placed under a transfer embargo but managed to negotiate it with the TFF First League, leading to them going on a mad spree of signing and registering a load of players despite not even having a permanent manager in place. In just two hours, they managed to snap up a record 22 players - 12 coming in on permanent contracts and a further 10 joining on loan deals until the end of the season.

== International career ==
After his impressive performances at Panserraikos Georgiadis was called up to the Greece national football team for a friendly match against Austria in November 2010 where he made his debut.

== Career statistics ==
Club	Season	League		Cup		Continental		Total	
Club	Season	Apps	Goals	Apps	Goals	Apps	Goals	Apps	Goals
Panserraikos	2007–08	26	5	2	0	-	-	28	5
Panserraikos	2008–09	19	3	4	0	-	-	22	3
Panserraikos	2009–10	32	4	2	0	-	-	34	4
Panserraikos	2010–11	28	7	0	0	-	-	28	7
Total		105	19	6	0	0	0	111	19
PAOK	2011–12	30	3	0	0	10	0	40	3
PAOK	2012–13	11	1	2	0	4	1	17	2
PAOK	2013–14	10	0	3	1	3	0	16	1
Total		51	4	5	1	17	1	73	6
Veria	2014–15	19	0	3	1	0	0	22	1
Veria	2015–16	14	0	5	0	0	0	16	0
Total		33	0	8	1	0	0	38	1
AEL Limassol	2016–17	28	0	4	0	0	0	32	0
Total		28	0	4	0	0	0	32	0
Ermis Aradippou	2017–18	6	1	0	0	0	0	6	1
Total		6	1	0	0	0	0	6	1
Doxa Drama	2017–18	10	1	0	0	0	0	10	1
Total		10	1	0	0	0	0	10	1
Keşla FK	2018–19	7	1	1	0	0	0	8	1
Total		7	1	1	0	0	0	8	1
Career total		217	24	23	2	17	1	257	27

== Honours ==
Panserraikos

- Football League: 2007–08
