= Jonathan Ayité =

Togolese footballer (born 1985)

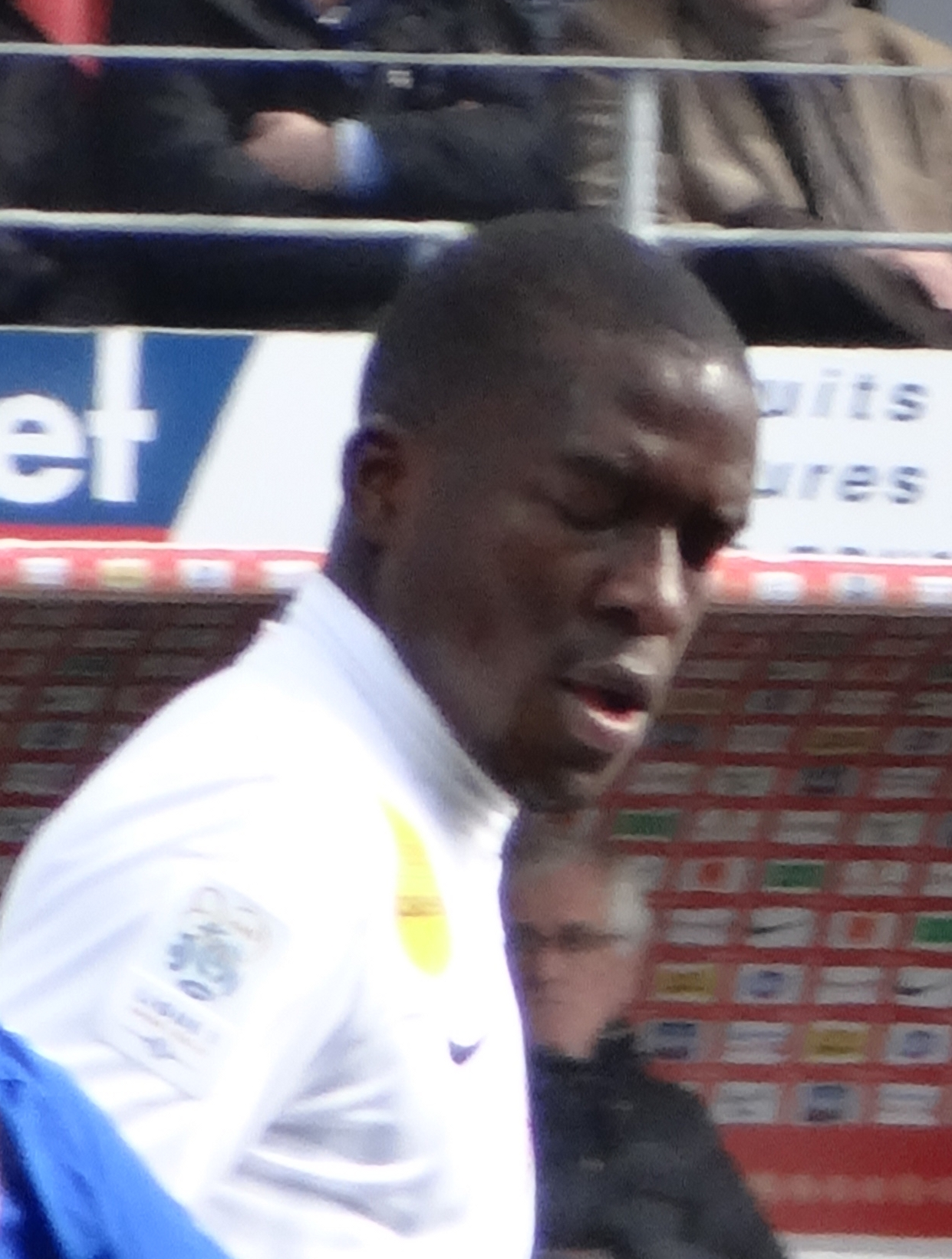

Personal information
- Full name: Jonathan Serge Folly Ayité
- Date of birth: 21 July 1985 (age 41)
- Place of birth: Bordeaux, France
- Height: 1.84 m (6 ft 0 in)
- Position: Striker

Youth career
- 2004–2006: Stade Bordelais
- 2006–2007: Bordeaux

Senior career*
Years	Team	Apps	(Gls)
2007–2009	Brest	35	(6)
2009–2011	Nîmes	70	(19)
2011–2014	Brest	64	(13)
2014–2017	Alanyaspor	71	(33)
2017	Yeni Malatyaspor	8	(3)
2017–2018	Samsunspor	25	(3)
2018–2019	Keşla	17	(5)
2019–2020	Olympiakos Nicosia	21	(5)
2021-22	Olympias Lympion		
2022	Krasava Ypsonas		
Total		317	(87)

International career^{‡}
2007–2016	Togo	24	(6)
- * Club domestic league appearances and goals as of 24 August 2020 ‡ National team caps and goals as of 29 March 2016

Jonathan Serge Folly Ayité (born 21 July 1985) is a former professional footballer. Born in France, he played for the Togo national team.

== Club career ==
=== Early career ===
Born and raised in Bordeaux, Ayité developed in the ranks of CFA2 side Stade Bordelais until the age of 21, at which point he joined Bordeaux's reserve team for a season, though the club opted against offering him a contract, and in the summer of 2007 he left to join Stade Brestois in Ligue 2.

==== First spell at Brest ====
In his first season in Ligue 2, Ayité scored 6 times in 26 appearances. Following an underwhelming start to the following season, he soon found himself benched, and consequently ended up joining fellow Ligue 2 side Nîmes Olympique in the winter transfer window.

=== Nîmes ===
Ayité helped his new club turn their fortunes around to stay in Ligue 2, scoring 4 goals in 18 appearances, which resulted in Nîmes offering him a three-year contract at the end of the season. The following season, his 16 goals in all competitions made him the club's top scorer, and he formed a successful strike partnership with Jean-Jacques Mandrichi. At the age of 24, he was quite a late bloomer, but nevertheless drew attention from larger sides, which would continue into the following season.

==== Return to Brest ====
On the final day of the 2010-11 season's winter transfer window, Ayité rejoined his former club Brest, now in Ligue 1, two years after his departure from the side, joining as a replacement for the injured Nolan Roux. On his Ligue 1 debut, he scored against AS Nancy Lorraine, and ultimately made 14 appearances during his first half-season in the league, scoring 4 goals.

The 2011-12 season saw limited playing time for Ayité, due to frequent injuries and other attackers coming before him at Brest, a story that would continue into the following season, as he continued to struggle for game time, besides a successful September 2012 in which he netted three times. He was, however, able to remain fit for the 2013 African Cup of Nations, after which he returned to limited game time at Brest as the club was relegated to Ligue 2. The season after was another difficult one for Ayité, in which he came under heavy scrutiny from Brest supporters and was released at the end of his contract.

=== Turkey ===
In July 2014, Ayité announced he was joining TFF First League (Turkish second division) club Alanyaspor. During his first season with the Turkish side, he scored 19 goals in 31 league appearances, following by 13 goals in 29 league appearances the following season as Alanyaspor won promotion to the Super Lig. Ayité was less prolific in the top flight of Turkish football, however, struggling for game time and only scoring once in 11 league appearances in the first half of the season, and in the 2016–17 winter transfer window, Ayité left Alanyaspor for TFF First League club Yeni Malatyaspor. He helped his new side gain promotion with 3 goals in 8 league appearances, but once again found himself lacking game time in the Super Lig, and thus left in September 2017 to join Samsunspor.

=== Late career ===
On 11 October 2018, Ayité signed for Keşla FK until the end of the 2018–19 season.

On 20 August 2019, Ayité signed for Cypriot First Division club Olympiakos Nicosia.

== International career ==
Ayité's first call-up to the Togo national team came in June 2007, when he was included in Togo's squad for 2008 African Cup of Nations qualification, alongside Emmanuel Adebayor and his own brother, Floyd.

In January 2010, as Togo were travelling to Angola to compete in the 2010 African Cup of Nations, Ayité and his teammates were victims of a terrorist attack, which prompted their withdrawal from the tournament.

He participated in Togo's unsuccessful 2012 African Cup of Nations qualification campaign, as well as their successful campaign to qualify for the 2013 African Cup of Nations, at which he played 3 matches as Togo reached the quarter-finals for the first time.

Ayité continued to represent the Togolese national side until March 2016, and he officially retired from international football in October 2016.

== Personal life ==
Ayité's younger brother, Floyd, is also an international footballer who plays for Togo.
