= Ángelo Peña =

Venezuelan footballer (born 1989)

Personal information
- Full name: Louis Ángelo Peña
- Date of birth: December 25, 1989 (age 36)
- Place of birth: Mérida, Venezuela
- Height: 1.71 m (5 ft 7 in)
- Position: Attacking midfielder

Team information
- Current team: Estudiantes de Mérida

Senior career*
Years	Team	Apps	(Gls)
2006–2009	Estudiantes de Mérida	52	(6)
2009–2011	Sp.Braga	1	(0)
2010	→ Portimonense (loan)	5	(1)
2011–2013	Caracas FC	79	(9)
2013–2014	Náutico	11	(0)
2014–2016	Mineros de Guayana	81	(13)
2016–2017	Deportivo Táchira	13	(0)
2017	Zamora	7	(1)
2017–2019	Mineros de Guayana	40	(6)
2019	Keşla	8	(0)
2019–2021	Deportivo La Guaira	74	(8)
2022	Estudiantes de Mérida	33	(5)
2023–2024	Boyacá Chicó	55	(7)
2024–	Estudiantes de Mérida	23	(3)

International career
2009	Venezuela U20	12	(1)
2009–	Venezuela	15	(0)
- * Club domestic league appearances and goals as of 2 August 2023

Louis Ángelo Peña (born 25 December 1989 in Mérida, Venezuela) is a Venezuelan footballer who currently plays for Estudiantes de Mérida. He has formerly had stints in Portugal for Braga and Portimonense, as well as a brief spell in the Azerbaijani Premier League.

== Career ==
Peña started his career in 2006 for his first club Estudiantes de Mérida in which he played 52 times and scored 6 goals. On 28 May 2009, he was signed by Portuguese club Braga for an undisclosed fee.

== International career ==
He was called up to the Venezuela U20 squad in 2009 and as well as the senior national team.
