= Ebrima Sohna =

Gambian footballer (born 1988)

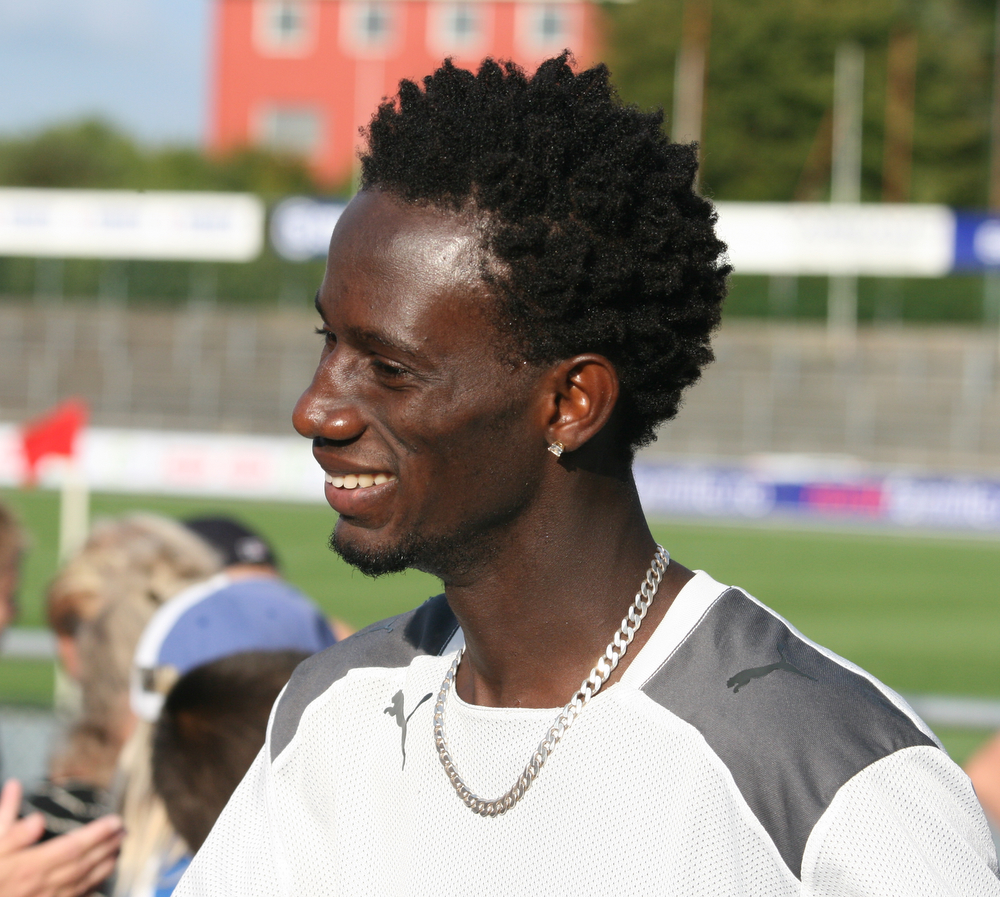

Personal information
- Full name: Ebrima Sohna
- Date of birth: 14 December 1988 (age 37)
- Place of birth: Bakau, Gambia
- Height: 1.78 m (5 ft 10 in)
- Position: Midfielder

Youth career
- Steve Biko FC
- –2005: Wallidan

Senior career*
Years	Team	Apps	(Gls)
2005–2006	Wallidan	18	(2)
2007–2011	Sandefjord	113	(4)
2012	RoPS	12	(1)
2012–2013	KuPS	12	(0)
2013	Vostok	25	(0)
2014–2016	KuPS	60	(0)
2016–2017	Al-Arabi SC	9	(1)
2017	VPS	15	(0)
2018	Keşla	18	(0)
2019–2020	Mosta	4	(0)

International career^{‡}
2005–	Gambia	37	(3)
- * Club domestic league appearances and goals as of 21 December 2018 ‡ National team caps and goals as of 16 November 2020

Ebrima Sohna (born 14 December 1988) is a Gambian footballer. He plays as a midfielder.

== Career ==
=== KuPS ===
In February 2014, Sohna resigned for KuPS on a one-year contract, extending his deal by another year in October 2014.

=== Al-Arabi SC ===
On January 13, 2016 he signed a 1-year and a half Deal with the Kuwaiti side.

=== Keşla ===
In January 2018, Sohna signed for Keşla FK on a contract until the end of the 2017–18 season. On 22 June 2018, Sohna a new contract with Keşla until the end of the 2018/19 season, leaving in December 2018.

== International career ==
Sohna is a holding midfielder who with his fellow country men won the CAF U-17 Championship in Banjul 2005. He went on to be a key part of the Gambian team which beat Brazil in the 2005 FIFA U-17 World Championship in Peru.

Sohna also helped the Gambia U-20 to qualify for the CAF U-20 Youth Championship CONGO 2007, where the Gambia came out third position thus qualifying for the FIFA U-20 Youth Championship in Canada. Back in Gambia where Sohna started his career in the youth system of Wallidan FC one of the top club in Gambian football.

Sohna scored his first international goal against Sierra Leone on 23 December 2007.

== Career statistics ==
=== Club ===
Club	Season	Division	League		Cup		Continental		Total	
Club	Season	Division	Apps	Goals	Apps	Goals	Apps	Goals	Apps	Goals
Wallidan	2005–06	GFA League First Division	18	2	–		–		18	2
Sandefjord	2007	Tippeligaen	16	0	0	0	–		16	0
Sandefjord	2008	1. divisjon	17	1	0	0	–		17	1
Sandefjord	2009	Tippeligaen	26	1	1	0	–		27	1
Sandefjord	2010	Tippeligaen	27	0	3	0	–		30	0
Sandefjord	2011	1. divisjon	23	2	3	0	–		26	2
Sandefjord	Total		109	4	7	0	0	0	116	4
RoPS	2012	Veikkausliiga	12	1	0	0	–		12	1
KuPS	2012	Veikkausliiga	12	0	1	0	–		13	0
Vostok	2013	Kazakhstan Premier League	25	0	1	0	–		26	0
KuPS	2014	Veikkausliiga	31	0	3	1	–		34	1
KuPS	2015	Veikkausliiga	29	0	6	0	–		35	0
KuPS	Total		60	0	9	1	0	0	69	1
Al-Arabi	2016–17	Kuwaiti Premier League	9	1	–		–		9	1
VPS	2017	Veikkausliiga	15	0	0	0	4 (Note: Appearances in UEFA Europa League)	1	19	1
Keşla	2017–18	Azerbaijan Premier League	11	0	3	0	–		14	0
Keşla	2018–19	Azerbaijan Premier League	7	0	1	0	2	0	10	0
Keşla	Total		18	0	4	0	2	0	24	0
Mosta	2019–20	Maltese Premier League	4	0	1	0	–		5	0
Career Total			282	8	23	1	6	1	311	10

=== International ===
Gambia national team
Year	Apps	Goals
2007	1	1
2008	6	0
2009	0	0
2010	4	1
2011	3	0
2012	1	0
2013	4	0
2014	0	0
2015	4	0
2016	0	0
2017	0	0
2018	4	0
2019	8	1
2020	2	0
Total	37	3

=== International goals ===
Scores and results list the Gambia's goal tally first.

No.	Date	Venue	Opponent	Score	Result	Competition
1.	23 December 2007	Independence Stadium, Bakau, Gambia	Sierra Leone	2–0	2–0	Friendly
2.	30 May 2010	Hans-Walter Wild Stadion, Bayreuth, Germany	Mexico	1–3	1–5	Friendly
3.	7 June 2019	Stade de Marrakech, Marrakesh, Morocco	Guinea	1–0	1–0	Friendly
