= Attila Yıldırım =

Dutch professional footballer (born 1990)

Personal information
- Date of birth: 22 November 1990 (age 35)
- Place of birth: Bad Mergentheim, Germany
- Height: 1.82 m (5 ft 11 1/2 in)
- Position: Striker

Team information
- Current team: Tarsus İdman Yurdu
- Number: 9

Youth career
- 1997–2010: Ajax

Senior career*
Years	Team	Apps	(Gls)
2010–2011	Utrecht	2	(1)
2011–2012	Kasımpaşa	19	(4)
2012–2014	Konyaspor	22	(1)
2013–2014	→ Bucaspor (loan)	16	(1)
2014	→ Şanlıurfaspor (loan)	7	(2)
2014–2015	Elazığspor	8	(1)
2015	Kocaeli Birlik Spor	12	(0)
2015–2016	Sivas Belediye Spor	30	(11)
2016–2017	Nazilli Belediyespor	18	(1)
2017–2018	MVV Maastricht	29	(8)
2018–2019	Sumgayit FK	16	(3)
2020	Kirsehir Belediyespor	0	(0)
2020–	Tarsus İdman Yurdu	1	(0)
- * Club domestic league appearances and goals as of 20 September 2020

Attila Yıldırım (born 22 November 1990) is a Turkish-Dutch professional footballer who plays as a striker for Tarsus İdman Yurdu.

== Career ==
Yıldırım has played club football in the Netherlands and Turkey for Utrecht, Kasımpaşa and Konyaspor. He signed his first professional contract at FC Utrecht's Paf team and was soon included in the first team squad. He made his first official appearance for the first team in the 2010–11 season on 19 January 2011, in the Eredivisie match against VVV-Venlo. In this first match, he scored his first goal in the Eredivisie. In the following weeks of the season, he took part in two more matches.

On 18 June 2011, it was announced that he would be transferred to Sivasspor, one of the Super League teams. This transfer did not materialize afterwards and he was transferred to Kasımpaşa, a 1st League team. He made his first official appearance for Kasımpaşa in the Ligue 1 match against Denizlispor on 25 September 2011. In August 2012, he was transferred to Torku Konyaspor.

In August 2018, it was announced that he transferred to Sumgayit FK, one of the Azerbaijan Premier League teams.

== Personal life ==
Yildirim was born in Germany to a Turkish family from Sivas. He moved to the Netherlands at a young age, and joined the AFC Ajax youth academy at the age of 7.
