= Andre Clennon =

Jamaican footballer (born 1989)

Personal information
- Full name: Andre Anthony Clennon
- Date of birth: 15 August 1989 (age 37)
- Place of birth: Portmore, Jamaica
- Height: 1.85 m (6 ft 1 in)
- Position: Forward

Team information
- Current team: Humble Lions
- Number: 14

Senior career*
Years	Team	Apps	(Gls)
2009–2012	Waterhouse		
2012	Lam Dong		
2012–2013	Waterhouse		
2013–2016	Arnett Gardens	35	(9)
2015	→ VPS (loan)	8	(3)
2016–2017	VPS	61	(7)
2018–2019	Keşla	26	(4)
2019–	Humble Lions	83	(11)

International career
2011–2020	Jamaica	5	(0)
Medal record
Men's football
Representing Jamaica
CONCACAF Gold Cup
Runner-up	2015 United States–Canada	Team
- * Club domestic league appearances and goals as of 1 July 2024

Andre Anthony Clennon (born 15 August 1989) is a Jamaican professional footballer who plays for Humble Lions as a forward. At international level, he made five appearances for the Jamaica national team.

== Club career ==
Clennon has played club football for Waterhouse, for Lam Dong in Vietnam and for Arnett Gardens. In September 2015, Clennon joined Finnish club VPS on loan until the end of the 2015 season.

In January 2018, Clennon signed for Keşla of the Azerbaijan Premier League on a contract until the end of the 2017–18 season. On 13 June 2018, Clennon a new contract with Keşla until the end of the 2018–19 season.

In August 2019, Clennon returned to Jamaica to play for Humble Lions F.C.

== International career ==
He made one international appearance for Jamaica in 2011.

== Career statistics ==
Appearances and goals by national team and year
National team	Year	Apps	Goals
Jamaica	2011	1	0
Jamaica	2015	3	0
Jamaica	2020	1	0
Total		5	0
