= 2025–26 Sabah FC season =

Sabah
2025–26 season
- Manager: Valdas Dambrauskas
- Stadium: Bank Respublika Arena
- Premier League: Champions
- Azerbaijan Cup: Champions
- Europa League: First qualifying round vs Celje
- Conference League: Third qualifying round vs Levski Sofia
- Top goalscorer: League: Joy-Lance Mickels (19); All: Joy-Lance Mickels (28)
- Highest home attendance: 7,000 (vs Celje, 10 July 2025)
- Lowest home attendance: 300 (vs Gabala, 4 February 2026)
- Average home league attendance: 1,390
Home colours	Away colours

The Sabah FC 2025–26 season was Sabah's eighth Azerbaijan Premier League season, and their ninth season in existence.

== Season overview ==
On 21 June, Sabah announced the signing of Akim Zedadka from Piast Gliwice, on a two-year contract.

On 27 June, Sabah announced the signing of Steve Solvet from Martigues, to a two-year contract.

On 1 July, Sabah announced the signing of Zinédine Ould Khaled from Angers, on a two-year contract.

On 28 August, Sabah announced the year-long loan signing of Veljko Simić from Sivasspor.

On 9 September, Sabah announced the year-long loan signing of Tymoteusz Puchacz from Holstein Kiel.

On 11 September, Sabah announced the year-long loan signing of Aaron Malouda from Lille. Also on 11 September, Sabah announced the return of Aleksey Isayev from Qarabağ, on a two-year contract.

On 5 January, Sabah announced that Bojan Letić had left the club after his contract was terminated by mutual consent.

On 6 January, Sabah announced that Umarali Rakhmonaliev had joined the club permanently on a three-year contract from Rubin Kazan after his loan deal had expired.

On 8 January, Sabah announced that Njegoš Kupusović had left the club after his contract was terminated by mutual consent.

On 9 January, Sabah announced the permanent signing of Aaron Malouda from Lille, to a four-year contract.

On 5 February, Sabah announced the signing of Orphé Mbina from Maribor on loan for the rest of the season, with an option to make the move permanent.

On 12 February, Sabah announced that Anatoliy Nuriyev had left the club after his contract was ended by mutual agreement.

On 13 February, Sabah announced that both Rustam Samigullin and Jamal Jafarov had left the club.

On 20 February, Godfred Boakye joined Sabah on loan from Birmingham City for the remainder of the season.

On 14 May, Sabah announced that they had made the permanent signing of Tymoteusz Puchacz from Holstein Kiel.

On 26 May, Sabah announced that they hadn't renewed their contract with Nicat Mehbalıyev and he would therefor leave the club at the end of the season, whilst they had also signed a new contract with Stas Pokatilov, keeping him at the club until the summer of 2027.

On 27 May, Sabah announced that they had extended their contract with Joy-Lance Mickels for another two season.

On 28 May, Sabah announced that they hadn't renewed their contract with Pavol Šafranko and he would therefor leave the club at the end of the season.

On 31 May, Sabah announced that they hadn't renewed their contract with Jesse Sekidika and he would therefor leave the club at the end of the season.

== Squad ==
As of match played 22 May 2026

No.	Name	Nationality	Position	Date of birth (age)	Signed from	Signed in	Contract ends	Apps.	Goals
Goalkeepers
55	Nijat Mehbaliyev	(Azerbaijan)	GK	11 September 2000 (age 26)	Qarabağ	2020	2026	26	0
92	Stas Pokatilov	(Kazakhstan)	GK	8 December 1992 (age 33)	Unattached	2025	2027	61	0
94	Ravan Mirzammadov	(Azerbaijan)	GK	2 August 2005 (age 21)	Academy	2025		1	0
Defenders
2	Amin Seydiyev	(Azerbaijan)	DF	15 November 1998 (age 27)	Gabala	2020		185	7
3	Steve Solvet	(Guadeloupe)	DF	20 March 1996 (age 30)	Martigues	2025	2027	42	5
5	Rahman Dashdamirov	(Azerbaijan)	DF	20 October 1999 (age 26)	Shamakhi	2023		71	1
17	Tellur Mutallimov	(Azerbaijan)	DF	8 April 1995 (age 31)	Sumgayit	2024		102	5
23	Godfred Boakye	(Belgium)	DF	12 January 2006 (age 20)	on loan from Birmingham City	2026	2029	0	0
27	Tymoteusz Puchacz	(Poland)	DF	23 January 1999 (age 27)	on loan from Holstein Kiel	2026	2029	33	2
40	Ygor Nogueira	(Brazil)	DF	27 March 1995 (age 31)	Chaves	2025		62	4
53	Andrey Santos	(Brazil)	DF	20 March 2005 (age 21)	Canaã EC	2025		8	0
80	Akim Zedadka (Note: Akim Zedadka was born in Pertuis, France, but qualified to represent Algeria, making his debut in 2022.)	(Algeria)	DF	30 May 1995 (age 31)	Piast Gliwice	2025	2027	38	1
Midfielders
6	Abdulakh Khaybulayev (Note: Abdulakh Khaybulayev was born in Khasavyurt, Russia, but qualified to represent Azerbaijan, making his debut in 2025.)	(Azerbaijan)	MF	19 August 2001 (age 25)	Academy	2021		82	1
7	Umarali Rakhmonaliev	(Uzbekistan)	MF	18 August 2003 (age 23)	Rubin Kazan	2026	2028	55	8
9	Khayal Aliyev	(Azerbaijan)	MF	18 February 2004 (age 22)	Academy	2023		87	10
10	Aleksey Isayev (Note: Aleksey Isayev was born in Krasnoyarsk, Russia, but qualified to represent Azerbaijan, making his debut in 2021.)	(Azerbaijan)	MF	9 November 1995 (age 30)	Qarabağ	2025	2027	135	15
11	Kaheem Parris	(Jamaica)	MF	6 January 2000 (age 26)	Dynamo Kyiv	2024		100	16
13	Ivan Lepinjica	(Croatia)	MF	9 July 1999 (age 27)	Slaven Belupo	2024		70	2
20	Joy-Lance Mickels (Note: Joy-Lance Mickels was born in Germany, but qualified to represent Rwanda, making his debut in 2026.)	(Rwanda)	MF	29 March 1994 (age 32)	Al Faisaly	2024	2028	139	72
21	Veljko Simić	(Serbia)	MF	17 February 1995 (age 31)	on loan from Sivasspor	2025	2026	34	12
22	Zinédine Ould Khaled	(France)	MF	14 January 2000 (age 26)	Angers	2025	2027	18	0
70	Jesse Sekidika	(Nigeria)	MF	14 July 1996 (age 30)	Eyüpspor	2023	2025(+1)	107	21
89	Cafar Mukhtarov	(Azerbaijan)	MF	22 February 2005 (age 21)	Şamaxı	2025		3	0
Forwards
18	Pavol Šafranko	(Slovakia)	FW	16 November 1994 (age 31)	Sepsi OSK	2024		54	18
19	Aaron Malouda	(France)	FW	30 November 2005 (age 20)	Lille	2026	2029	29	9
83	Stephen Ende	(Nigeria)	FW	8 June 2006 (age 20)	Dino SC	2024		9	0
90	Timilehin Oluwaseun	(Nigeria)	FW	10 June 2005 (age 21)	Dino SC	2024		2	0
99	Orphé Mbina	(Gabon)	FW	2 November 2000 (age 25)	on loan from Maribor	2026	2026	11	3
Out on loan
22	Abdulla Rzayev	(Azerbaijan)	MF	12 March 2002 (age 24)	Academy	2021		21	0
	Rauf Rustamli	(Azerbaijan)	MF	11 January 2003 (age 23)	Gabala	2023		2	0
Left during the season
7	Bojan Letić	(Bosnia and Herzegovina)	DF	21 December 1992 (age 33)	Unattached	2022		125	7
8	Ayaz Guliyev	(Russia)	MF	27 November 1996 (age 29)	Khimki	2023	2026	54	1
10	Anatoliy Nuriyev	(Azerbaijan)	MF	20 May 1996 (age 30)	Kolos Kovalivka	2022		119	12
23	Jamal Jafarov	(Azerbaijan)	FW	25 February 2002 (age 24)	Anzhi Makhachkala	2020		24	0
72	Rustam Samiqullin	(Azerbaijan)	GK	23 December 2002 (age 23)	Academy	2020		4	0
99	Njegoš Kupusović	(Serbia)	FW	22 February 2001 (age 25)	Trenčín	2024		29	2

== Transfers ==
=== In ===
Date	Position	Nationality	Name	From	Fee	Ref.
21 June 2025	DF	(Algeria)	Akim Zedadka	Piast Gliwice	Undisclosed	
27 June 2025	DF	(Guadeloupe)	Steve Solvet	Martigues	Undisclosed	
1 July 2025	MF	(France)	Zinédine Ould Khaled	Angers	Undisclosed	
11 September 2025	MF	(Azerbaijan)	Aleksey Isayev	Qarabağ	Undisclosed	
6 January 2026	MF	(Uzbekistan)	Umarali Rakhmonaliev	Rubin Kazan	Undisclosed	
9 January 2026	FW	(France)	Aaron Malouda	Lille	Undisclosed	
14 May 2026	DF	(Poland)	Tymoteusz Puchacz	Holstein Kiel	Undisclosed	

=== Loans in ===
Date from	Position	Nationality	Name	From	Date to	Ref.
28 January 2025	MF	(Uzbekistan)	Umarali Rakhmonaliev	Rubin Kazan	31 December 2025	
28 August 2025	MF	(Serbia)	Veljko Simić	Sivasspor	Undisclosed	
9 September 2025	DF	(Poland)	Tymoteusz Puchacz	Holstein Kiel	14 May 2026	
11 September 2025	FW	(France)	Aaron Malouda	Lille	9 January 2026	
5 February 2026	FW	(Gabon)	Orphé Mbina	Maribor	30 June 2026	
20 February 2026	DF	(Belgium)	Godfred Boakye	Birmingham City	30 June 2026	

=== Out ===
Date	Position	Nationality	Name	To	Fee	Ref.
26 January 2026	MF	(Russia)	Ayaz Guliyev	Arsenal Tula	Undisclosed	

=== Loans out ===
Date from	Position	Nationality	Name	To	Date to	Ref.
15 July 2025	DF	(Azerbaijan)	Abdulla Rzayev	Turan Tovuz	End of season	
15 July 2025	MF	(Azerbaijan)	Rauf Rustamli	Sumgayit	4 January 2026	
13 January 2026	MF	(Azerbaijan)	Rauf Rustamli	Karvan	30 June 2026	

=== Released ===
Date	Position	Nationality	Name	Joined	Date	Ref
11 June 2025	MF	(Azerbaijan)	Şakir Seyidov	Kapaz	5 July 2025	
17 June 2025	DF	(Malaysia)	Jon Irazabal	Johor Darul Ta'zim	23 June 2025	
24 June 2025	MF	(Azerbaijan)	Namiq Ələsgərov	Zira	5 August 2025	
28 June 2025	MF	(Luxembourg)	Vincent Thill	Zira	8 July	
30 June 2025	DF	(Morocco)	Sofian Chakla	AE Larissa	15 July 2025	
5 January 2026	DF	(Bosnia and Herzegovina)	Bojan Letić	Sloga Meridian	20 March 2026	
8 January 2026	FW	(Serbia)	Njegoš Kupusović	Radnik Bijeljina	8 February 2026	
12 February 2026	MF	(Azerbaijan)	Anatoliy Nuriyev	Zira	12 February 2026	
13 February 2026	GK	(Azerbaijan)	Rustam Samigullin			
13 February 2026	FW	(Azerbaijan)	Jamal Jafarov	Kapaz	14 February 2026	
26 May 2026	GK	(Azerbaijan)	Nicat Mehbalıyev	26 May 2026	Shafa Baku	
28 May 2026	FW	(Slovakia)	Pavol Šafranko			
31 May 2026	FW	(Nigeria)	Jesse Sekidika	Gangwon	16 June 2026	

== Friendlies ==
11 January 2026	Sabah	2–0	Şamaxı	Masazir
AZT (UTC+4)	Sekidika; Ende	Report		Stadium: Bank Respublika Arena

17 January 2026	Sabah	9–1	Mingəçevir	Masazir
AZT (UTC+4)	Aliyev; Simić; Rakhmonaliev (pen.); Parris; Mutallimov	Report	Goal	Stadium: Bank Respublika Arena

== Competitions ==
=== Overview ===
Competition	First match	Last match	Starting round	Final position	Record							
Competition	First match	Last match	Starting round	Final position	Pld	W	D	L	GF	GA	GD	Win %
Premier League	24 August 2025	22 May 2026	Matchday 2	Winners	33	24	6	3	75	25	+50	72.73
Azerbaijan Cup	3 December 2025	13 May 2026	Round of 16	Winners	6	3	3	0	11	8	+3	50.00
UEFA Europa League	10 July 2025	17 July 2025	First qualifying round	First qualifying round	2	0	1	1	5	6	−1	0.00
UEFA Conference League	24 July 2025	14 August 2025	Second qualifying round	Third qualifying round	4	2	0	2	6	4	+2	50.00
Total					45	29	10	6	97	43	+54	64.44

Last updated: 22 May 2026
Source: Competitions

=== Premier League ===
==== Results summary ====
Overall								Home						Away					
Pld	W	D	L	GF	GA	GD	Pts	W	D	L	GF	GA	GD	W	D	L	GF	GA	GD
33	24	6	3	75	25	+50	78	11	3	3	35	12	+23	13	3	0	40	13	+27

Last updated: 22 May 2026.
Source: See Results

==== Results by round ====
Round	2	3	4	5	6	7	8	9	10	11	12	13	14	15	1	16	17	18	19	20	21	22	23	24	25	26	27	28	29	30	31	32	33
Ground	A	H	A	H	H	A	H	A	H	A	H	A	H	A	H	A	H	A	H	A	H	A	H	A	H	A	H	A	H	A	H	H	A
Result	W	L	D	W	D	W	W	D	W	W	D	W	W	W	W	W	W	W	W	W	W	D	W	W	W	W	D	W	W	W	L	L	W
Position	5	8	8	6	6	5	4	5	4	3	3	3	2	2	1	1	1	1	1	1	1	1	1	1	1	1	1	1	1	1	1	1	1

Updated to match(es) played on 22 May 2026. Source: See Results
A = Away; H = Home; W = Win; D = Draw; L = Loss

==== Results ====
24 August 2025 2	Şamaxı	1–2	Sabah	Shamakhi
17:00 AZT (UTC+4)	Msanga (yellow card) 35'; Balau 59'; Apolinario (yellow card) 89'; Shuaibu (yellow card) 90+4'	Report	Mickels 1', 76'; Dashdamirov (yellow card) 25'; Aliyev (yellow card) 90+5'	Stadium: City Stadium; Attendance: 2,000; Referee: Rəşad Əhmədov

31 August 2025 3	Sabah	0–1	İmişli	Masazir
19:30 AZT (UTC+4)	Simić (yellow card) 88'	Report	Morgan (yellow card) 9'; Aghazade 68'	Stadium: Bank Respublika Arena; Attendance: 1,200; Referee: Fərid Hacıyev

14 September 2025 4	Neftçi	0–0	Sabah	Baku
19:00 AZT (UTC+4)		Report	Santos (yellow card) 37'; Mickels (yellow card) 49'; Puchacz (yellow card) 50'	Stadium: Neftçi Arena; Attendance: 1,300; Referee: İnqilab Məmmədov

20 September 2025 5	Sabah	2–0	Turan Tovuz	Masazir
19:30 AZT (UTC+4)	Zedadka (yellow card) 9'; Simić 56'; Mickels (yellow card) 90+1'; Šafranko 90+6' (pen.)	Report	Ozobić (yellow card) 61'	Stadium: Bank Respublika Arena; Attendance: 820; Referee: Rəvan Həmzəzadə

28 September 2025 6	Sabah	1–1	Sumgayit	Masazir
19:00 AZT (UTC+4)	Parris (yellow card) 16'; Mickels 27'; Dashdamirov (yellow card) 80'	Report	Abdullazade (yellow card) 11'; Senhadji (yellow card) 13'; Akhmedzade 35'; Dzhenetov (yellow card) 90+6'	Stadium: Bank Respublika Arena; Attendance: 711; Referee: Aliyar Aghayev

5 October 2025 7	Karvan	0–2	Sabah	Shamakhi
15:00 AZT (UTC+4)		Report	Mickels 31' (pen.); Parris 37'	Stadium: City Stadium; Attendance: 200; Referee: Tural Qurbanov

19 October 2025 8	Sabah	3–0	Zira	Masazir
16:00 AZT (UTC+4)	Malouda (yellow card) 15' (goal) 42'; Simić 45+2', 75'; Sekidika (yellow card) 90'	Report	Júnior (yellow card) 10'	Stadium: Bank Respublika Arena; Attendance: 971; Referee: Cavid Cəlilov

25 October 2025 9	Araz-Naxçıvan	2–2	Sabah	Baku
16:00 AZT (UTC+4)	Diniyev (yellow card) 31'; Simakala (yellow card) 38' (goal) 90+9'; Paro 59'	Report	Lepinjica (yellow card) 33'; Solvet (yellow card) 39' (goal) 55'; Dashdamirov (yellow card) 48'; Mickels 73' (pen.)	Stadium: Dalga Arena; Attendance: 250; Referee: Rəşad Əhmədov

3 November 2025 10	Sabah	1–0	Gabala	Masazir
19:30 AZT (UTC+4)	Seydiyev (yellow card) 19'; Solvet 28'; Rakhmonaliev (yellow card) 73'	Report	Mammadov (yellow card) HT	Stadium: Bank Respublika Arena; Attendance: 600; Referee: Fərid Hacıyev

9 November 2025 11	Kapaz	1–3	Sabah	Qabala
16:44 AZT (UTC+4)	Onanuga 45+5' (yellow card) 82'; Ohori (yellow card) 63'; Seyidov (yellow card) 88'; Şəfiyev (yellow card) 90+2'; Aşurov (yellow card) 90+4'	Report	Simić 22' (yellow card) 44'; Mickels 28' (yellow card) 29'; Nogueira 54'; Parris (yellow card) 83'; Puchacz (yellow card) 90+4'	Stadium: City Stadium; Attendance: 250; Referee: Tural Qurbanov

23 November 2025 12	Sabah	0–0	Şamaxı	Masazir
15:00 AZT (UTC+4)	Rakhmonaliev (yellow card) 75'	Report	Agjabayov (yellow card) 54'; Ismayilov (yellow card) 74'; Veremyeyev (yellow card) 87'	Stadium: Bank Respublika Arena; Attendance: 827; Referee: Kamranbəy Rəhimov

29 November 2025 13	İmişli	0–3	Sabah	Baku
14:30 AZT (UTC+4)	Juninho (yellow card) 62'; Rollo (yellow card) 62'	Report	Seydiyev 54'; Solvet 60'; Rakhmonaliev (yellow card) 62'; Isayev (yellow card) 62'; Parris 90+3'	Stadium: Lökbatan Olympic Sport Complex Stadium; Attendance: 350; Referee: Elchin Masiyev

8 December 2025 14	Sabah	2–0	Neftçi	Masazir
20:00 AZT (UTC+4)	Zedadka 58'; Mickels 77'	Report	Seck (yellow card) 79'; Rezabala (yellow card) 85'	Stadium: Bank Respublika Arena; Attendance: 3,500; Referee: Rəvan Həmzəzadə

13 December 2025 15	Turan Tovuz	1–3	Sabah	Tovuz
16:30 AZT (UTC+4)	Ozobić 82'; Henrique (yellow card) 89'	Report	Mickels 30'; Nogueira (yellow card) 42'; Aliyev (yellow card) 54'; Simić 69'; Rakhmonaliev 79'; Seydiyev (yellow card) 80'; Malouda (yellow card) 83'; Pokatilov (yellow card) 90+2'; Lepinjica (yellow card) 90+4'	Stadium: City Stadium; Attendance: 3,000; Referee: Əliyar Ağayev

18 December 2025 1	Sabah	2–1	Qarabağ	Masazir
19:30 (UTC+4)	Zedadka (yellow card) 19'; Mickels 53'; Malouda 88'	Report	Andrade 9'; Addai (yellow card) 75'	Stadium: Bank Respublika Arena; Attendance: 4,226; Referee: Elçin Məsiyev
Note: Match originally scheduled for 17 August 2025.

22 December 2025 16	Sumgayit	1–3	Sabah	Sumgait
19:30 AZT (UTC+4)	Akhmedzade (yellow card) 9'; Vásquez (yellow card) 16' (goal) 66'; Ramalingom (yellow card) 55'; Abdullazade (yellow card) 88'; Ninković (yellow card) 90+6'	Report	Simić 27', 50'; Keffel 62' (o.g.)	Stadium: City Stadium; Attendance: 2,700; Referee: Tural Qurbanov

25 January 2026 17	Sabah	4–1	Karvan	Masazir
18:30 AZT (UTC+4)	Malouda 11', 22'; Nogueira (yellow card) 19'; Rakhmonaliev 32'; Puchacz (yellow card) 77'; Sekidika (yellow card) 82'; Simić 84'	Report	Ngwisani (yellow card) 29'; Rustamov (yellow card) 55'; Doyeni 83'	Stadium: Bank Respublika Arena; Attendance: 976; Referee: Rauf Cabarov

31 January 2026 18	Zira	1–3	Sabah	Zirə
17:00 AZT (UTC+4)	Alıyev (yellow card) 70'; Volkovi 83'	Report	Simić 9'; Lepinjica 22' (yellow card) 82'; Aliyev 27'	Stadium: Zira Olympic Sport Complex Stadium; Attendance: 500; Referee: Kamal Umudlu

8 February 2026 19	Sabah	4–1	Araz-Naxçıvan	Masazir
16:00 AZT (UTC+4)	Rakhmonaliev 9' (pen.); Malouda 11'; Aliyev 16', 68' (yellow card) 71'; Solvet (yellow card) 66'	Report	Hasanalizade (yellow card) 37'; Ahmadzada (yellow card) 59'; Andrade (yellow card) 80'; Buludov (yellow card) 82'; Santos 86'	Stadium: Bank Respublika Arena; Attendance: 951; Referee: Tural Qurbanov

16 February 2026 20	Gabala	0–1	Sabah	Qabala
17:00 AZT (UTC+4)	Sissoko (yellow card) 82'	Report	Aliyev 54'; Sekidika (yellow card) 90+5'	Stadium: City Stadium; Attendance: 1,000; Referee: Rauf Cabarov

22 February 2026 21	Sabah	1–0	Kapaz	Masazir
17:00 AZT (UTC+4)	Parris 88'; Seydiyev (yellow card) 90+8'	Report	Hüseynli (yellow card) 54'; Seyidov (red card) 90+8'	Stadium: Bank Respublika Arena; Attendance: 971; Referee: Əliyar Ağayev

1 March 2026 22	Qarabağ	3–3	Sabah	Baku
19:00 AZT (UTC+4)	Medina (yellow card) 2' (goal) 79'; Bicalho 73'; Silva (yellow card) 82'; Qurbanlı 84' (yellow card) FT	Report	Aliyev 13'; Nogueira (yellow card) 23'; Solvet (yellow card) 31'; Malouda 54'; Mickels 61'	Stadium: Azersun Arena; Attendance: 10,361; Referee: Tural Qurbanov

10 March 2026 23	Sabah	7–1	Gabala	Masazir
19:15 AZT (UTC+4)	Mickels 11', 33'; Isayev 24'; Parris 40'; Malouda 53'; Sekidika 63'; Dashdamirov 77'	Report	Ba Loua 87'	Stadium: Bank Respublika Arena; Attendance: 500; Referee: İnqilab Məmmədov

14 March 2026 24	İmişli	0–5	Sabah	Baku
15:00 AZT (UTC+4)	Morgan (yellow card) 69'	Report	Solvet 11'; Mickels 14' (pen.), 35'; Parris 49'; Isayev 73' (pen.)	Stadium: Lökbatan Olympic Sport Complex Stadium; Attendance: 180; Referee: Rauf Cabarov

19 March 2026 25	Sabah	3–1	Sumgayit	Masazir
19:15 AZT (UTC+4)	Parris 24' (yellow card) 34'; Mickels 49'; Simić 71'	Report	Simon 90+1'	Stadium: Bank Respublika Arena; Attendance: 1.000; Referee: Rəvan Həmzəzadə

7 April 2026 26	Araz-Naxçıvan	2–4	Sabah	Baku
19:30 AZT (UTC+4)	Santos 7' (yellow card) 44'; Keyta 26' (yellow card) 61'; Diniyev (yellow card) 70'; Abbasov (yellow card) 90+6'	Report	Simić 14'; Mickels 37' (pen.), 62' (pen.); Parris 81'	Stadium: Dalga Arena; Attendance: 300; Referee: Fərid Hacıyev

11 April 2026 27	Sabah	2–2	Zira	Masazir
18:00 AZT (UTC+4)	Mickels 16'; Nogueira 51'; Rakhmonaliev (yellow card) 82'	Report	Renato 32' (pen.); Aydın 41'; Gomis (yellow card) 45+2'; Silva (yellow card) 55'; Djibrilla (yellow card) 62'	Stadium: Bank Respublika Arena; Attendance: 1,320; Referee: Tural Qurbanov

18 April 2026 28	Qarabağ	0–1	Sabah	Baku
19:30 (UTC+4)	Silva (yellow card) 11'; Durán (yellow card) 90+5'	Report	Mickels (penalty missed) 13'; Solvet (yellow card) 20'; Simić (yellow card) 29'; Khaybulayev 45' (red card) 47'; Zedadka (yellow card) 52'; Pokatilov (yellow card) 82'	Stadium: Republican Stadium; Attendance: 17,338; Referee: Elçin Məsiyev

27 April 2026 29	Sabah	2–0	Karvan	Masazir
20:00 AZT (UTC+4)	Thompson (yellow card) 15' (yellow-red card) 36'	Report	Mbina 49'; Malouda 55'; Isayev (red card) 64'; Zedadka (yellow card) 75'	Stadium: Bank Respublika Arena; Attendance: 1,000; Referee: Kamranbəy Rəhimov

3 May 2026 30	Şamaxı	0–3	Sabah	Shamakhi
16:00 AZT (UTC+4)		Report	Dashdamirov (yellow card) 21'; Solvet 37'; Lepinjica (yellow card) 51'; Mickels 78'; Mukhtarov (yellow card) 85'; Rakhmonaliev 90+1' (pen.)	Stadium: City Stadium; Attendance: 1,500; Referee: Kamal Umudlu

8 May 2026 31	Sabah	0–1	Kapaz	Masazir
19:30 AZT (UTC+4)	Santos (yellow card) 55'; Nogueira (yellow card) 63'; Khaybulayev (yellow card) 71'	Report	Hajiyev 46'; Verdasca (yellow card) 57'	Stadium: Bank Respublika Arena; Attendance: 750; Referee: Elvin Bayramov

17 May 2026 32	Sabah	1–2	Neftçi	Masazir
18:00 AZT (UTC+4)	Isayev 3'; Mickels (red card) 85'	Report	Shtohrin 10'; Safarov (yellow card) 45' (yellow-red card) 85'; Mathew 70'	Stadium: Bank Respublika Arena; Attendance: 3,300; Referee: Kamal Umudlu

22 May 2026 33	Turan Tovuz	1–2	Sabah	Tovuz
17:00 AZT (UTC+4)	Aliyev (yellow card) 12'; Guseynov 86'	Report	Lepinjica (yellow card) 12'; Malouda 15'; Dashdamirov (yellow card) 20'; Aliyev 63'	Stadium: City Stadium; Attendance: 450; Referee: Rauf Cabarov

==== League table ====
Pos	Team	Pld	W	D	L	GF	GA	GD	Pts	Qualification or relegation
1	Sabah (C)	33	24	6	3	75	25	+50	78	Qualification for the Champions League first qualifying round
2	Qarabağ	33	21	6	6	71	27	+44	69	Qualification for the Europa League first qualifying round (Note: The 2025–26 Azerbaijan Cup winner (Sabah) qualified for the Europa League first qualifying round. Since Sabah also won the league, the berth was passed to the second place team and the Conference League berths go to the third and fourth placed teams.)
3	Turan Tovuz (Note: UEFA removed Turan Tovuz for a past match-fixing case.)	33	17	8	8	44	27	+17	59 (Note: Matches won: Turan-Tovuz 17, Neftçi 16.)	
4	Neftçi	33	16	11	6	57	32	+25	59	Qualification for the Conference League second qualifying round
5	Zira	33	13	14	6	43	36	+7	53	Qualification for the Conference League first qualifying round

Source: Soccerway
Rules for classification: 1) Points; 2) Matches won; 3) Goal difference; 4) Goals scored; 5) Head-to-head points; 6) Head-to-head goal difference; 7) Lower number of points based on yellow and red cards; 8) Draw.
(C) Champions

=== Azerbaijan Cup ===
3 December 2025 Round of 16	İmişli	1–2 (a.e.t.)	Sabah	Baku
14:00 AZT (UTC+4)	Banguera (yellow card) 32'; Karaklajić (yellow card) 39'; Morgan (yellow card) 66'; Aliyev 89' (pen.); Rollo (yellow card) 120'	Report	Mickels 59' (yellow card) 95'; Parris 96'; Nogueira (yellow card) 106'; Malouda (yellow card) 115'	Stadium: Lökbatan Olympic Sport Complex Stadium; Attendance: 75; Referee: Kamal Umudlu

4 February 2026 Quarter-final 1st leg	Sabah	0–0	Gabala	Masazir
19:30 AZT (UTC+4)	Sekidika (yellow card) 45+2'	Report	Massoumou (penalty missed) 29	Stadium: Bank Respublika Arena; Attendance: 300; Referee: Fərid Hacıyev

5 March 2026 Quarter-final 2nd leg	Gabala	3–3 (a.e.t.) (3–3 agg.) (2–4 p)	Sabah	Qabala
18:00 AZT (UTC+4)	Ba Loua (red card) 48'; Aliyev (yellow card) 50'; Akinade 88', 90'; Rashidov 115', (yellow card) 116'	Report	Puchacz 31', 62'; Solvet (yellow card) 57'; Ygor Nogueira (yellow card) 61'; Mickels 104'	Stadium: City Stadium; Attendance: 300; Referee: Rəvan Həmzəzadə
	Penalties
	Sierra (penalty scored); Musayev (penalty missed); Massoumou (penalty scored); Isgandarov (penalty missed)		Mickels (penalty scored); Puchacz (penalty scored); Isayev (penalty scored); Parris (penalty scored)

3 April 2026 Semi-final 1st leg	Qarabağ	2–2	Sabah	Baku
20:00 AZT (UTC+4)	Kady 29', 60'; Montiel (yellow card) 47'; Cafarguliyev (yellow card) 80'	Report	Dashdamirov (yellow card) 14'; Rakhmonaliev 23', 65' (pen.); Isayev (yellow card) 86'	Stadium: Tofiq Bahramov Republican Stadium; Attendance: 21,000; Referee: Rauf Cabarov

22 April 2026 Semi-final 2nd leg	Sabah	2–1 (4–3 agg.)	Qarabağ	Masazir
20:00 AZT (UTC+4)	Nogueira (yellow card) 11'; Solvet (yellow card) 11'; Pokatilov (yellow card) 17'; Malouda (yellow card) 44'; Simić 79'; Mbina 88'	Report	Kochalski (red card) 37'; Durán 59' (yellow card) 90+5'; Janković (yellow card) FT (yellow-red card) FT; Qurbanlı (yellow card) FT	Stadium: Bank Respublika Arena; Attendance: 8,730; Referee: Rəvan Həmzəzadə

13 May 2026 Final	Zira	1–2	Sabah	Baku
20:00 AZT (UTC+4)	Alıyev (yellow card) 2'; Aydın 4'; Gomis (yellow card) 53'; Mutsinzi (yellow card) 76'	Report	Malouda (yellow card) 57'; Solvet (yellow card) 66'; Mbina 70'; Mickels 90+1'; Parris (yellow card) 90+6'	Stadium: Neftçi Arena; Attendance: 7,045; Referee: Elçin Məsiyev

=== Europa League ===
==== Qualifying rounds ====
10 July 2025 First qualifying round 1st leg	Sabah (Azerbaijan)	2–3	(Slovenia) Celje	Baku, Azerbaijan
20:00 AZT (UTC+4)	Šafranko 3', 18' (pen.)	Report	Kovačević 7', 78'; Nieto (yellow card) 16'; Tutyškinas (yellow card) 19'; Hrka 90+4'	Stadium: Bank Respublika Arena; Attendance: 7,000; Referee: Daniyar Sakhi (Kazakhstan)

17 July 2025 First qualifying round 2nd leg	Celje (Slovenia)	3–3 (a.e.t.) (6–5 agg.)	(Azerbaijan) Sabah	Celje, Slovenia
22:00 AZT (UTC+4)	Kovačević 19' (pen.) (yellow card) 35'; Vuklišević 49'; Nieto (yellow card) 102'; Iosifov 108'; Vuklišević (yellow card) 120+1'; Sluga (yellow card) 120+2'	Report	Mickels 9', 63', 64' (yellow card) 76'; Lepinjica (yellow card) 37'; Dashdamirov (yellow card) 41'; Solvet (yellow card) 80'	Stadium: Stadion Z'dežele; Attendance: 3,068; Referee: Dragomir Draganov (Bulgaria)

=== Conference League ===
==== Qualifying rounds ====
24 July 2025 Second qualifying round 1st leg	Petrocub Hîncești (Moldova)	0–2	(Azerbaijan) Sabah	Chișinău, Moldova
21:00 AZT (UTC+4)	Lungu (yellow card) 19'; Bogaciuc (yellow card) 21'; Ngah (yellow card) 45+3'	Report	Šafranko 82'; Parris 90'	Stadium: Zimbru Stadium; Attendance: 4,953; Referee: Gai Leibovitz (Israel)
Note: Petrocub Hîncești played their home matches at the Zimbru Stadium in Chișinău, instead of their regular stadium, the Stadionul Municipal, in Hîncești, which did not meet UEFA requirements.

31 July 2025 Second qualifying round 2nd leg	Sabah (Azerbaijan)	4–1 (6–1 agg.)	(Moldova) Petrocub Hîncești	Baku, Azerbaijan
20:00 AZT (UTC+4)	Mickels 22', 28', 44'; Solvet (yellow card) 40'; Šafranko 45'; Guliyev (yellow card) 52'; Parris (yellow card) 86'	Report	Solvet 41' (o.g.); Cojocaru (yellow card) 58'; Jardan (yellow card) 84'	Stadium: Bank Respublika Arena; Attendance: 5,621; Referee: Danilo Nikolić (Serbia)

7 August 2025 Third qualifying round 1st leg	Levski Sofia (Bulgaria)	1–0	(Azerbaijan) Sabah	Sofia, Bulgaria
22:00 AZT (UTC+4)	Rupanov 90+8'	Report	Lepinjica (yellow card) 18'; Mickels (yellow card) 21'; Šafranko (yellow card) 63'; Zedadka (yellow card) 90+3'	Stadium: Stadion Georgi Asparuhov; Attendance: 16,163; Referee: Duje Strukan (Croatia)

14 August 2025 Third qualifying round 2nd leg	Sabah (Azerbaijan)	0–2 (0–3 agg.)	(Bulgaria) Levski Sofia	Baku, Azerbaijan
20:00 AZT (UTC+4)	Solvet (yellow card) 19'; Parris (yellow card) 60'; Aliyev (yellow card) 79'	Report	Kirilov 40'; Soula 87'	Stadium: Bank Respublika Arena; Attendance: 6,606; Referee: Mykola Balakin (Ukraine)

== Squad statistics ==
As of match played 22 May 2026

=== Appearances and goals ===
No.	Pos	Nat	Player	Total		Premier League		Azerbaijan Cup		Europa League		Conference League	
No.	Pos	Nat	Player	Apps	Goals	Apps	Goals	Apps	Goals	Apps	Goals	Apps	Goals
2	DF	(Azerbaijan) AZE	Amin Seydiyev	25	1	8+12	1	2+1	0	0+1	0	0+1	0
3	DF	(Guadeloupe) GLP	Steve Solvet	42	5	30	5	6	0	2	0	4	0
5	DF	(Azerbaijan) AZE	Rahman Dashdamirov	30	1	14+6	1	2+3	0	2	0	3	0
6	MF	(Azerbaijan) AZE	Abdulakh Khaybulayev	33	1	8+15	1	3+1	0	2	0	0+4	0
7	MF	(Uzbekistan) UZB	Umarali Rakhmonaliev	36	6	26+3	4	5	2	0+2	0	0	0
9	MF	(Azerbaijan) AZE	Khayal Aliyev	36	6	16+12	6	2+1	0	2	0	0+3	0
10	MF	(Azerbaijan) AZE	Aleksey Isayev	27	3	17+4	3	3+3	0	0	0	0	0
11	MF	(Jamaica) JAM	Kaheem Parris	39	9	16+14	7	3+2	1	0+1	0	0+3	1
13	MF	(Croatia) CRO	Ivan Lepinjica	39	1	29	1	4	0	2	0	4	0
17	DF	(Azerbaijan) AZE	Tellur Mutallimov	8	0	3+4	0	0+1	0	0	0	0	0
18	FW	(Slovakia) SVK	Pavol Šafranko	11	5	4+1	1	0	0	2	2	4	2
19	FW	(France) FRA	Aaron Malouda	29	9	21+3	9	3+2	0	0	0	0	0
20	MF	(Rwanda) RWA	Joy-Lance Mickels	36	28	19+6	19	3+2	3	2	3	4	3
21	MF	(Serbia) SRB	Veljko Simić	34	12	26+2	11	6	1	0	0	0	0
22	MF	(France) FRA	Zinédine Ould Khaled	18	0	3+7	0	0+2	0	0+2	0	4	0
27	DF	(Poland) POL	Tymoteusz Puchacz	35	2	30	0	5	2	0	0	0	0
40	DF	(Brazil) BRA	Ygor Nogueira	35	2	22+2	2	5	0	2	0	4	0
53	DF	(Brazil) BRA	Andrey Santos	8	0	3+3	0	0	0	0	0	0+2	0
55	GK	(Azerbaijan) AZE	Nicat Mehbalıyev	2	0	2	0	0	0	0	0	0	0
70	MF	(Nigeria) NGR	Jesse Sekidika	27	1	5+14	1	2	0	0+2	0	4	0
80	DF	(Algeria) ALG	Akim Zedadka	38	1	25+1	1	4+2	0	2	0	4	0
83	FW	(Nigeria) NGR	Stephen Ende	9	0	1+6	0	2	0	0	0	0	0
89	MF	(Azerbaijan) AZE	Cafar Mukhtarov	3	0	0+3	0	0	0	0	0	0	0
92	GK	(Kazakhstan) KAZ	Stas Pokatilov	42	0	30	0	6	0	2	0	4	0
94	GK	(Azerbaijan) AZE	Ravan Mirzammadov	1	0	1	0	0	0	0	0	0	0
99	FW	(Gabon) GAB	Orphé Mbina	11	3	4+4	1	0+3	2	0	0	0	0
Players away on loan:
Players who left Sabah during the season:
7	DF	(Bosnia and Herzegovina) BIH	Bojan Letić	5	0	0	0	0	0	0+1	0	3+1	0
8	MF	(Azerbaijan) AZE	Ayaz Guliyev	12	0	1+8	0	0+1	0	0	0	0+2	0
10	MF	(Azerbaijan) AZE	Anatoliy Nuriyev	13	0	1+7	0	0	0	2	0	2+1	0
99	FW	(Serbia) SRB	Njegoš Kupusović	4	0	0	0	0	0	0+2	0	0+2	0

=== Goal scorers ===
Place	Position	Nation	Number	Name	Premier League	Azerbaijan Cup	Europa League	Conference League	Total
1	MF	(Rwanda)	20	Joy-Lance Mickels	19	3	3	3	28
2	MF	(Serbia)	21	Veljko Simić	11	1	0	0	12
3	FW	(France)	19	Aaron Malouda	9	0	0	0	9
3	MF	(Jamaica)	11	Kaheem Parris	7	1	0	1	9
5	MF	(Azerbaijan)	9	Khayal Aliyev	6	0	0	0	6
5	MF	(Uzbekistan)	7	Umarali Rakhmonaliev	4	2	0	0	6
7	DF	(Guadeloupe)	3	Steve Solvet	5	0	0	0	5
7	FW	(Slovakia)	18	Pavol Šafranko	1	0	2	2	5
9	MF	(Azerbaijan)	10	Aleksey Isayev	3	0	0	0	3
9	FW	(Gabon)	99	Orphé Mbina	1	2	0	0	3
11	DF	(Brazil)	40	Ygor Nogueira	2	0	0	0	2
11	DF	(Poland)	27	Tymoteusz Puchacz	0	2	0	0	2
13	DF	(Azerbaijan)	2	Amin Seydiyev	1	0	0	0	1
13	DF	(Algeria)	80	Akim Zedadka	1	0	0	0	1
13	MF	(Croatia)	13	Ivan Lepinjica	1	0	0	0	1
13	MF	(Nigeria)	70	Jesse Sekidika	1	0	0	0	1
13	DF	(Azerbaijan)	5	Rahman Dashdamirov	1	0	0	0	1
13	MF	(Azerbaijan)	6	Abdulakh Khaybulayev	1	0	0	0	1
13				Own goal	1	0	0	0	1
				TOTALS	75	11	5	6	97

=== Clean sheets ===
Place	Position	Nation	Number	Name	Premier League	Azerbaijan Cup	Europa League	Conference League	Total
1	GK	(Kazakhstan)	92	Stas Pokatilov	13	1	0	1	15
2	GK	(Azerbaijan)	55	Nicat Mehbalıyev	1	0	0	0	1
				TOTALS	14	1	0	1	16

=== Disciplinary record ===
Number	Nation	Position	Name	Premier League		Azerbaijan Cup		Europa League		Conference League		Total	
Number	Nation	Position	Name	Booked	Sent off (straight red)	Booked	Sent off (straight red)	Booked	Sent off (straight red)	Booked	Sent off (straight red)	Booked	Sent off (straight red)
2	(Azerbaijan)	DF	Amin Seydiyev	3	0	0	0	0	0	0	0	3	0
3	(Guadeloupe)	DF	Steve Solvet	4	0	3	0	1	0	2	0	10	0
5	(Azerbaijan)	DF	Rahman Dashdamirov	5	0	1	0	1	0	0	0	7	0
6	(Azerbaijan)	MF	Abdulakh Khaybulayev	1	1	0	0	0	0	0	0	1	1
7	(Uzbekistan)	MF	Umarali Rakhmonaliev	4	0	0	0	0	0	0	0	4	0
9	(Azerbaijan)	MF	Khayal Aliyev	3	0	0	0	0	0	1	0	4	0
10	(Azerbaijan)	MF	Aleksey Isayev	1	1	1	0	0	0	0	0	2	1
11	(Jamaica)	MF	Kaheem Parris	3	0	1	0	0	0	2	0	6	0
13	(Croatia)	MF	Ivan Lepinjica	5	0	0	0	1	0	1	0	7	0
18	(Slovakia)	FW	Pavol Šafranko	0	0	0	0	0	0	1	0	1	0
19	(France)	FW	Aaron Malouda	2	0	3	0	0	0	0	0	5	0
20	(Rwanda)	MF	Joy-Lance Mickels	3	1	1	0	1	0	1	0	6	1
21	(Serbia)	MF	Veljko Simić	3	0	0	0	0	0	0	0	3	0
27	(Poland)	DF	Tymoteusz Puchacz	3	0	0	0	0	0	0	0	3	0
40	(Brazil)	DF	Ygor Nogueira	4	0	3	0	0	0	0	0	7	0
53	(Brazil)	MF	Andrey Santos	2	0	0	0	0	0	0	0	2	0
70	(Nigeria)	FW	Jesse Sekidika	3	0	1	0	0	0	0	0	4	0
80	(Algeria)	DF	Akim Zedadka	4	0	0	0	0	0	1	0	5	0
89	(Azerbaijan)	MF	Cafar Mukhtarov	1	0	0	0	0	0	0	0	1	0
92	(Kazakhstan)	GK	Stas Pokatilov	2	0	1	0	0	0	0	0	3	0
Players away on loan:
Players who left Sabah during the season:
8	(Azerbaijan)	MF	Ayaz Guliyev	0	0	0	0	0	0	1	0	1	0
			TOTALS	56	3	15	0	4	0	7	0	82	3
