= 2024–25 Sabah FC season =

Sabah
2024–25 season
- Manager: Krunoslav Rendulić (until 25 November); Vasili Berezutski (from 25 November)
- Stadium: Bank Respublika Arena
- Premier League: 5th
- Azerbaijan Cup: Winners
- Conference League: Third qualifying round vs St Patrick's Athletic
- Top goalscorer: League: Jesse Sekidika (11); All: Jesse Sekidika (13); Pavol Šafranko (13)
- Highest home attendance: 8,000 (vs Maccabi Haifa, 1 August 2024)
- Lowest home attendance: 430 (vs Sabail, 29 November 2024)
- Average home league attendance: 1,327
Home colours	Away colours

The Sabah FC 2024–25 season was Sabah's seventh Azerbaijan Premier League season, and their eighth season in existence.

== Season overview ==
On 21 January, Sabah announced the signing of Stas Pokatilov after he'd left Tobol by mutual agreement.

On 28 January, Sabah announced the signing of Umarali Rakhmonaliev on loan from Rubin Kazan until the end of the season.

== Squad ==
As of match played 31 May 2025

No.	Name	Nationality	Position	Date of birth (age)	Signed from	Signed in	Contract ends	Apps.	Goals
Goalkeepers
1	Yusif İmanov	(Azerbaijan)	GK	27 September 2002 (aged 22)	Academy	2020		94	0
55	Nijat Mehbaliyev	(Azerbaijan)	GK	11 September 2000 (aged 24)	Qarabağ	2020	2026	24	0
92	Stas Pokatilov	(Kazakhstan)	GK	8 December 1992 (aged 32)	Unattached	2025		19	0
Defenders
2	Amin Seydiyev	(Azerbaijan)	DF	15 November 1998 (aged 26)	Gabala	2020		160	6
3	Jon Irazabal	(Spain)	DF	28 November 1996 (aged 28)	SD Amorebieta	2022	2025	99	6
4	Sofian Chakla	(Morocco)	DF	2 September 1993 (aged 31)	Ponferradina	2023	2025	71	5
5	Rahman Dashdamirov	(Azerbaijan)	DF	20 October 1999 (aged 25)	Shamakhi	2023	2025	41	0
7	Bojan Letić	(Bosnia and Herzegovina)	DF	21 December 1992 (aged 32)	Unattached	2022		120	7
17	Tellur Mutallimov	(Azerbaijan)	DF	8 April 1995 (aged 30)	Sumgayit	2024		94	5
32	Elgun Dünyamaliyev	(Azerbaijan)	DF	26 March 2006 (aged 19)	Academy	2024		2	0
40	Ygor Nogueira	(Brazil)	DF	27 March 1995 (aged 30)	Chaves	2025		27	2
Midfielders
6	Abdulakh Khaybulayev	(Azerbaijan)	MF	19 August 2001 (aged 23)	Academy	2021		49	0
8	Ayaz Guliyev	(Russia)	MF	27 November 1996 (aged 28)	Khimki	2023	2026	42	1
9	Anatoliy Nuriyev	(Azerbaijan)	MF	20 May 1996 (aged 29)	Kolos Kovalivka	2022	2025	105	12
10	Namiq Ələsgərov	(Azerbaijan)	MF	3 February 1995 (aged 30)	Bursaspor	2022	2025	83	7
11	Kaheem Parris	(Jamaica)	MF	6 January 2000 (aged 25)	Dynamo Kyiv	2024		61	7
12	Vincent Thill	(Luxembourg)	MF	4 February 2000 (aged 25)	Vorskla Poltava	2023	2025	35	3
13	Ivan Lepinjica	(Croatia)	MF	9 July 1999 (aged 25)	Slaven Belupo	2024		31	1
15	Seymur Mammadov	(Azerbaijan)	MF	29 May 2003 (aged 22)	Academy	2024		10	0
20	Joy-Lance Mickels	(Germany)	MF	29 March 1994 (aged 31)	Al Faisaly	2024		103	44
22	Abdulla Rzayev	(Azerbaijan)	MF	12 March 2002 (aged 23)	Academy	2021		21	0
33	Umarali Rakhmonaliev	(Uzbekistan)	MF	18 August 2003 (aged 21)	on loan from Rubin Kazan	2024		19	2
70	Jesse Sekidika	(Nigeria)	MF	14 July 1996 (aged 28)	Eyüpspor	2023	2025(+1)	80	20
77	Shakir Seyidov	(Azerbaijan)	MF	31 December 2000 (aged 24)	Academy	2018		60	2
88	Khayal Aliyev	(Azerbaijan)	MF	18 February 2004 (aged 21)	Academy	2023		51	4
Forwards
18	Pavol Šafranko	(Slovakia)	FW	16 November 1994 (aged 30)	Sepsi OSK	2024		44	13
99	Njegoš Kupusović	(Serbia)	FW	22 February 2001 (aged 24)	Trenčín	2024		25	2
Out on loan
16	Rustam Samiqullin	(Azerbaijan)	GK	23 December 2002 (aged 22)	Academy	2020		4	0
33	Jamal Jafarov	(Azerbaijan)	FW	25 February 2002 (aged 23)	Anzhi Makhachkala	2020	2025	24	0
40	Rauf Rustamli	(Azerbaijan)	DF	11 January 2003 (aged 22)	Gabala	2023		2	0
90	Timilehin Oluwaseun	(Nigeria)	FW	10 June 2005 (aged 19)	Dino SC	2024		2	0
	Fakhri Mammadli	(Azerbaijan)	DF	3 December 2005 (aged 19)	Academy	2024		0	0
Left during the season
4	Elvin Camalov	(Azerbaijan)	MF	4 February 1995 (aged 30)	Zira	2021		113	2

== Transfers ==
=== In ===
Date	Position	Nationality	Name	From	Fee	Ref.
21 January 2025	GK	(Kazakhstan)	Stas Pokatilov	Unattached	Free	

=== Loans in ===
Date from	Position	Nationality	Name	From	Date to	Ref.
28 January 2025	MF	(Uzbekistan)	Umarali Rakhmonaliev	Rubin Kazan	31 December 2025	

=== Out ===
Date	Position	Nationality	Name	To	Fee	Ref.
22 January 2025	MF	(Azerbaijan)	Elvin Camalov	Neftçi	Undisclosed	

=== Loans out ===
Date from	Position	Nationality	Name	To	Date to	Ref.
17 June 2024	GK	(Azerbaijan)	Rauf Rustamli	Shamakhi	End of season	
11 July 2024	DF	(Azerbaijan)	Fakhri Mammadli	Shamakhi	End of season	
9 August 2024	GK	(Azerbaijan)	Rustam Samigullin	Neftçi	End of season	
13 September 2024	FW	(Azerbaijan)	Jamal Jafarov	Kapaz	End of season	
16 January 2025	FW	(Nigeria)	Timilehin Oluwaseun	İmişli	End of season	

=== Released ===
Date	Position	Nationality	Name	Joined	Date	Ref
13 June 2024	FW	(Georgia (country))	Davit Volkovi	Zira	13 June 2024	
14 June 2024	MF	(Spain)	Cristian Ceballos			
23 June 2024	MF	(Brazil)	Christian	Turan Tovuz	1 July 2024	
30 June 2024	MF	(Azerbaijan)	Ildar Alekperov	Zira	10 September 2024	
1 July 2024	DF	(Morocco)	Marouane Hadhoudi	Difaâ Hassani	17 August 2024	
2 July 2024	FW	(Nigeria)	Emmanuel Apeh	Al Ittihad	22 September 2024	
10 July 2024	MF	(Azerbaijan)	Veysal Rzayev	Turan Tovuz	10 July 2024	
27 July 2024	FW	(Curaçao)	Jearl Margaritha	Phoenix Rising	16 August 2024	
28 July 2024	FW	(Algeria)	Ishak Belfodil	IMT	10 February 2025	

== Friendlies ==
	v
AZT (UTC+4)

== Competitions ==
=== Overview ===
Competition	First match	Last match	Starting round	Final position	Record							
Competition	First match	Last match	Starting round	Final position	Pld	W	D	L	GF	GA	GD	Win %
Premier League	4 August 2024	24 May 2025	Matchday 1	5th	36	10	18	8	50	46	+4	27.78
Azerbaijan Cup	3 December 2024	1 June 2025	Last 16	Winners	6	3	3	0	12	6	+6	50.00
UEFA Conference League	25 July 2024	15 August 2024	Second qualifying round	Third qualifying round	4	1	0	3	6	8	−2	25.00
Total					46	14	21	11	68	60	+8	30.43

Last updated: 31 May 2025
Source: Competitions

=== Premier League ===
==== Results summary ====
Overall								Home						Away					
Pld	W	D	L	GF	GA	GD	Pts	W	D	L	GF	GA	GD	W	D	L	GF	GA	GD
36	10	18	8	50	46	+4	48	6	10	2	25	20	+5	4	8	6	25	26	−1

Last updated: 24 May 2025.
Source: See Results

==== Results by round ====
Round	1	2	3	4	5	6	7	8	9	10	11	12	13	14	15	16	17	18	19	20	21	22	23	24	25	26	27	28	29	30	31	32	33	34	35	36
Ground	H	H	A	H	A	H	A	A	H	A	H	A	H	A	H	H	A	A	A	H	A	H	A	A	H	A	H	A	H	A	H	H	A	H	A	H
Result	D	L	W	W	W	D	W	L	D	D	D	L	D	D	W	D	W	L	D	D	L	W	D	D	D	L	D	D	L	L	W	D	D	W	D	W
Position	4	8	6	3	3	4	3	5	5	5	5	5	5	5	5	5	5	5	5	5	5	5	5	5	5	5	5	5	5	5	5	5	5	5	5	5

Updated to match(es) played on 24 May 2025. Source: See Results
A = Away; H = Home; W = Win; D = Draw; L = Loss

==== Results ====
4 August 2024 1	Sabah	2–2	Shamakhi	Masazir
17:30 AZT (UTC+4)	Ələsgərov (yellow card) 2' (goal) 16'; Aliyev 37'	Report	Muradov (yellow card) 35'; Abbasov 44'; Pusi 52'	Stadium: Bank Respublika Arena; Attendance: 503; Referee: İnqilab Məmmədov

11 August 2024 2	Sabah	0–2	Zira	Masazir
21:00 AZT (UTC+4)	Lepinjica (yellow card) 13'	Report	Utzig (yellow card) 40' (goal) 50' (pen.); Soumah 52'; Akhmedzade (yellow card) 53'; Acka (yellow card) 79'	Stadium: Bank Respublika Arena; Attendance: 1,350; Referee: Əliyar Ağayev

18 August 2024 3	Neftçi	0–2	Sabah	Baku
20:30 AZT (UTC+4)	Kuč (yellow card) 40'; Shinyashiki (yellow card) 71'; Safarov (yellow card) 90+4'	Report	Seydiyev 54'; Mickels 76'	Stadium: Dalga Arena; Attendance: 800; Referee: Tural Qurbanov

25 August 2024 4	Sabah	3–1	Sumgayit	Masazir
18:15 AZT (UTC+4)	Ələsgərov 44'; Šafranko 54'; Lepinjica (yellow card) 59'; Sekidika 77'; Chakla (yellow card) 90+4'	Report	Medeiros 13'; Vujnović (yellow card) 33'	Stadium: Bank Respublika Arena; Attendance: 1,500; Referee: Elçin Məsiyev

31 August 2024 5	Kapaz	2–3	Sabah	Tovuz
19:30 AZT (UTC+4)	Braga 10'; N'Diaye 17'; Aliyev (yellow card) 48'; Keverton (yellow card) 52'; Khvalko (yellow card) 66'	Report	Chakla (yellow card) 40'; Mickels 53' (pen.), 85'; Nuriyev (yellow card) 67'; Sekidika 70'	Stadium: City Stadium; Attendance: 400; Referee: Nicat İsmayıllı

15 September 2024 6	Sabah	2–2	Turan Tovuz	Masazir
20:30 AZT (UTC+4)	Sekidika 6', 46'; Mickels (yellow card) 44'; Seydiyev (yellow card) 56'; Lepinjica (yellow card) 72'	Report	Turabov (yellow card) 27'; Miller 35'; John (yellow card) 73'; Guseynov 76' (yellow card) 90+4'	Stadium: Bank Respublika Arena; Attendance: 2,420; Referee: Əliyar Ağayev

22 September 2024 7	Sabail	2–4	Sabah	Baku
18:00 AZT (UTC+4)	Bilali 4'; Abdullazade 39'; Lytvyn (yellow card) 40'; Gomis (yellow card) 45+2'; Larrucea (yellow card) 45+2'; Çelik (yellow card) 62'; Abdullazade (yellow card) 73'; Y.Nabiyev (yellow card) 80'; Abdullayev (yellow card) 88'	Report	Mickels 8'; Lepinjica 21' (yellow card) 65'; Sekidika 27'; Seydiyev (yellow card) 59'; Nogueira (yellow card) 68'; Šafranko 76' (pen.) (yellow card) 76'	Stadium: Bayil Arena; Attendance: 600; Referee: Kamal Umudlu

29 September 2024 8	Qarabağ	3–2	Sabah	Baku
16:00 AZT (UTC+4)	Bayramov 6'; Akhundzade 8' (yellow card) 42'; Medina 17'	Report	Nuriyev (yellow card) 41'; Mickels 45+1' (yellow card) 87'; Šafranko 51'	Stadium: Azersun Arena; Attendance: 1,500; Referee: İnqilab Məmmədov

5 October 2024 9	Sabah	1–1	Araz-Naxçıvan	Masazir
19:30 AZT (UTC+4)	Šafranko 5'; Letić (yellow card) 16'	Report	Santos 8' (yellow card) 76'	Stadium: Bank Respublika Arena; Attendance: 600; Referee: Cavid Cəlilov

20 October 2024 10	Zira	1–1	Sabah	Zirə
17:30 AZT (UTC+4)	Isayev (yellow card) 45'; Papunashvili 90+1'	Report	Sekidika 7' (yellow card) 43'	Stadium: Zira Olympic Sport Complex Stadium; Attendance: 800; Referee: Rəşad Əhmədov

27 October 2024 11	Sabah	0–0	Neftçi	Masazir
17:00 AZT (UTC+4)	Mickels (yellow card) 66'; Khaybulayev (yellow card) 77'; Seyidov (yellow card) 83'	Report	Guzzo (yellow card) 33'; Matias (yellow card) 79'; Conteh (yellow card) 90+3'	Stadium: Bank Respublika Arena; Attendance: 2,001; Referee: Tural Qurbanov

3 November 2024 12	Sumgayit	1–0	Sabah	Sumgait
19:00 AZT (UTC+4)	Milović (yellow card) 10'; Kahat 90+4'; Suleymanli (yellow card) 90+5'	Report	Nogueira (yellow card) 9'; Mickels (yellow card) 62'	Stadium: City Stadium; Attendance: 1,100; Referee: Rəvan Həmzəzadə

9 November 2024 13	Sabah	2–2	Kapaz	Masazir
19:30 AZT (UTC+4)	Aliyev 32' (o.g.); Parris 73'; Nogueira (yellow card) 90+3'	Report	Aliyev 4'; Suleymanov 89'; Pachu (yellow card) 90+3'	Stadium: Bank Respublika Arena; Attendance: 1,100; Referee: Əliyar Ağayev

24 November 2024 14	Turan Tovuz	1–1	Sabah	Tovuz
17:00 AZT (UTC+4)	John 46'; Ghaderi (yellow card) 90+2'	Report	Camalov (yellow card) 33'; Kupusović (yellow card) 44'; Mickels 67' (yellow card) 83'; Irazabal (yellow card) 90+1'	Stadium: City Stadium; Attendance: 4,500; Referee: Rəşad Əhmədov

29 November 2024 15	Sabah	1–0	Sabail	Masazir
19:00 AZT (UTC+4)	Mickels 29'; Guliyev (yellow card) 31'; Ələsgərov (yellow card) 53'; Mutallimov (yellow card) 86'	Report		Stadium: Bank Respublika Arena; Attendance: 430; Referee: Rəvan Həmzəzadə

7 December 2024 16	Sabah	1–1	Qarabağ	Masazir
18:00 AZT (UTC+4)	Camalov (yellow card) 46'; Kupusović 49'; Thill (yellow card) 85'	Report	Romão (yellow card) 35'; Akhundzade 68'	Stadium: Bank Respublika Arena; Attendance: 3,000; Referee: Elçin Məsiyev

14 December 2024 17	Araz-Naxçıvan	0–1	Sabah	Baku
16:30 AZT (UTC+4)	Ramon (yellow card) 20'; Santos (yellow card) 38'	Report	Mickels (yellow card) 77' (goal) 78'	Stadium: Liv Bona Dea Arena; Attendance: 200; Referee: İnqilab Məmmədov

22 December 2024 18	Shamakhi	3–1	Sabah	Shamakhi
14:00 AZT (UTC+4)	Adilkhanov 23'; Pusi 55'; L-J.Mickels 62'; Fernandes (yellow card) 90+2'; Bakić (yellow card) 90+3'	Report	Šafranko 38'; Seydiyev (yellow card) 72'	Stadium: City Stadium; Attendance: 1,000; Referee: Cavid Cəlilov

19 January 2025 19	Neftçi	1–1	Sabah	Baku
18:30 AZT (UTC+4)	Seck (yellow card) 54'; Matias (yellow card) 66'; Shtohrin 79'; Ohori (yellow card) 90+4'	Report	Chakla (yellow card) 39'; Salahlı 77' (o.g.)	Stadium: Neftçi Arena; Attendance: 1,500; Referee: Kamal Umudlu

25 January 2025 20	Sabah	0–0	Sumgayit	Masazir
18:30 AZT (UTC+4)		Report	Jaloliddinov (yellow card) 52'	Stadium: Bank Respublika Arena; Attendance: 1,001; Referee: Elçin Məsiyev

31 January 2025 21	Kapaz	3–2	Sabah	Tovuz
16:00 AZT (UTC+4)	Ba 11'; Samadov 54'; Hüseynli 64' (pen.) (yellow card) 74'	Report	Šafranko 6'; Nogueira (yellow card) 14' (yellow-red card) 63'; Sekidika 45+4'; Dashdamirov (yellow card) 66'	Stadium: City Stadium; Attendance: 300; Referee: Fərid Hacıyev

9 February 2025 22	Sabah	2–1	Turan Tovuz	Masazir
17:00 AZT (UTC+4)	Khaybulayev (yellow card) 13'; Šafranko 50' (pen.); Sekidika 61'; Chakla (yellow card) 88'	Report	Souza 15'; Ghaderi (yellow card) 25'; Rzayev (yellow card) 44'; Christian (yellow card) 64'	Stadium: Bank Respublika Arena; Attendance: 800; Referee: İnqilab Məmmədov

17 February 2025 23	Sabail	0–0	Sabah	Baku
19:00 AZT (UTC+4)	Rüstəmov (yellow card) 56'	Report	Lepinjica (yellow card) 39'; Nogueira (yellow card) 89'	Stadium: Bayil Arena; Attendance: 300; Referee: Rəşad Əhmədov

22 February 2025 24	Qarabağ	1–1	Sabah	Baku
19:00 AZT (UTC+4)	Zoubir 17'; Bayramov (yellow card) 38'	Report	Sekidika 35'; Lepinjica (yellow card) 54'; Chakla (yellow card) 64'	Stadium: Republican Stadium; Attendance: 500; Referee: Əliyar Ağayev

4 March 2025 25	Sabah	2–2	Araz-Naxçıvan	Masazir
20:00 AZT (UTC+4)	Aliyev 7'; Seydiyev (yellow card) 22'; Rakhmonaliev (yellow card) 34'; Chakla 64'; Dashdamirov (yellow card) 78'	Report	Benny 11'; Wanderson (yellow card) 19'; Isgandarov (yellow card) 66' (goal) 72'; Ribeiro (yellow card) 90+3'	Stadium: Bank Respublika Arena; Attendance: 550; Referee: Rəvan Həmzəzadə

9 March 2025 26	Shamakhi	1–0	Sabah	Shamakhi
15:00 AZT (UTC+4)	Adilkhanov 31'; Mammadli (yellow card) 90+5'	Report	Aliyev (yellow card) 64'	Stadium: City Stadium; Attendance: 1,500; Referee: Cavid Cəlilov

15 March 2025 27	Sabah	1–1	Zira	Masazir
19:30 AZT (UTC+4)	Khaybulayev (yellow card) 31'; Sekidika 34'; Lepinjica (yellow card) 60'; Seydiyev (yellow card) 62'	Report	Volkovi 63'	Stadium: Bank Respublika Arena; Attendance: 1,000; Referee: Rəşad Əhmədov

29 March 2025 28	Sumgayit	3–3	Zira	Sumgait
19:00 AZT (UTC+4)	Vásquez 18'; Abdikholikov 47'; Yansané 87'	Report	Rakhmonaliev 6', 71'; Mutallimov 77'	Stadium: City Stadium; Attendance: 1,000; Referee: Tural Qurbanov

6 April 2025 29	Sabah	0–1	Kapaz	Masazir
17:00 AZT (UTC+4)	Lepinjica (yellow card) 30'	Report	Paná 41'; Hüseynli (yellow card) 53'; Manafov (yellow card) 81'; Samadov (yellow card) 90+3'	Stadium: Bank Respublika Arena; Attendance: 1,149; Referee: Rauf Cabarov

12 April 2025 30	Turan Tovuz	2–1	Sabah	Tovuz
17:00 AZT (UTC+4)	Guseynov 56' (yellow card) 69'; Jô 57'; Sadykhov (yellow card) 63'; Hurtado (yellow card) 82'	Report	Nuriyev 14'; Šafranko (yellow card) 21' (yellow-red card) 45+2'; Sekidika (yellow card) 51'	Stadium: City Stadium; Attendance: 2,500; Referee: Elçin Məsiyev

19 April 2025 31	Sabah	3–2	Sabail	Masazir
17:30 AZT (UTC+4)	Chakla 31' (yellow card) 79'; Mickels (yellow card) 69' (goal) 90+3'; Irazabal (yellow card) 76'; Lytvyn 82' (o.g.)	Report	Muradov (yellow card) 12'; Nshuti 22'; Lytvyn (yellow card) 59'; Allouch 74'	Stadium: Bank Respublika Arena; Attendance: 821; Referee: Fərid Hacıyev

27 April 2025 32	Sabah	1–1	Qarabağ	Masazir
20:00 AZT (UTC+4)	Irazabal (yellow card) 40'; Letić (yellow card) 59' (goal) 73'	Report	Xhixha 42' (pen.); Qurbanlı (yellow card) 46'; Isayev (yellow card) 64'; Hüseynov (yellow card) 84'	Stadium: Bank Respublika Arena; Attendance: 3,960; Referee: Tural Qurbanov

3 May 2025 33	Araz-Naxçıvan	1–1	Sabah	Baku
19:30 AZT (UTC+4)	Isgandarov 20'; Wanderson (yellow card) 36'; Jatobá (yellow card) 75'	Report	Thill 43'; Rakhmonaliev (yellow card) 80'; Mutallimov (yellow card) 90+1'	Stadium: Liv Bona Dea Arena; Attendance: 250; Referee: Kamal Umudlu

9 May 2025 34	Sabah	3–1	Shamakhi	Masazir
19:00 AZT (UTC+4)	Nogueira 12', 72'; Guliyev (yellow card) 22'; Ələsgərov (yellow card) 74'; Lepinjica (yellow card) 83'; Šafranko 90+3'	Report	L-J.Mickels 26'; Veremyeyev (yellow card) 90'	Stadium: Bank Respublika Arena; Attendance: 701; Referee: Fərid Hacıyev

17 May 2025 35	Zira	1–1	Sabah	Zirə
17:00 AZT (UTC+4)	Papunashvili 26'	Report	Chakla (yellow card) 57'; Šafranko 68'	Stadium: Zira Olympic Sport Complex Stadium; Attendance: 1,000; Referee: Elçin Məsiyev

24 May 2025 36	Sabah	1–0	Neftçi	Masazır
19:30 AZT (UTC+4)	Chakla (yellow card) 50'; Sekidika 64'	Report	Kuč (yellow card) 76'	Stadium: Bank Respublika Arena; Attendance: 1,000; Referee: Tural Qurbanov

==== League table ====
Pos	Team	Pld	W	D	L	GF	GA	GD	Pts	Qualification or relegation
3	Araz-Naxçıvan	36	15	13	8	34	29	+5	58	Qualification for the Conference League second qualifying round
4	Turan Tovuz	36	14	13	9	45	39	+6	55	
5	Sabah	36	10	18	8	50	46	+4	48	Qualification for the Europa League first qualifying round (Note: Sabah qualified for the Europa League first qualifying round as the 2024–25 Azerbaijan Cup winners.)
6	Neftçi	36	10	13	13	39	49	−10	43	
7	Shamakhi	36	9	9	18	32	46	−14	36	

Source: Soccerway
Rules for classification: 1) Points; 2) Matches won; 3) Goal difference; 4) Goals scored; 5) Head-to-head points; 6) Head-to-head goal difference; 7) Lower number of points based on yellow and red cards; 8) Draw.

=== Azerbaijan Cup ===
3 December 2024 Last 16	Turan Tovuz	2–2 (a.e.t.) (1–3 p)	Sabah	Tovuz
18:00 AZT (UTC+4)	Souza 28'; John 113'	Report	Irazabal 45+2'; Guliyev (yellow card) 57'; Letić (yellow card) 89'; Kupusović 118'	Stadium: City Stadium; Attendance: 3,000; Referee: Inqilab Mammadov
	Penalties
	Aliyev (penalty scored); Guseynov (penalty missed); Rzayev (penalty missed); John (penalty missed)		Parris (penalty missed); Chakla (penalty scored); Aliyev (penalty scored); Mickels (penalty scored)

5 February 2025 Quarter-final 1st leg	Sabah	0–0	Sumgayit	Masazır
18:30 AZT (UTC+4)	Aliyev (yellow card) 30'; Šafranko (yellow card) 90+4'	Report	Dzhenetov (yellow card) 90+4'	Stadium: Bank Respublika Arena; Attendance: 950; Referee: Əliyar Ağayev

27 February 2025 Quarter-final 2nd leg	Sumgayit	0–4 (0–4 agg.)	Sabah	Sumgait
19:30 AZT (UTC+4)	Suleymanli (yellow card) 38'; Abdullazade (yellow card) 78'	Report	Nuriyev 54'; Aliyev 71'; Mickels 82'; Seydiyev 90+3'	Stadium: City Stadium; Attendance: 1,500; Referee: Elçin Məsiyev

2 April 2025 Semi-final 1st leg	Neftçi	1–2	Sabah	Baku
19:30 AZT (UTC+4)	Matias (penalty missed) 21' 21'; Seck (yellow card) 37'; Darboe (yellow card) 82'	Report	Salahlı 11' (o.g.); Mutallimov (yellow card) 29'; Šafranko 52'	Stadium: Neftçi Arena; Attendance: 2,934; Referee: Əliyar Ağayev

23 April 2025 Semi-final 2nd leg	Sabah	1–1 (3–2 agg.)	Neftçi	Masazır
21:00 AZT (UTC+4)	Sekidika 23'; Mickels (yellow card) 63'; Lepinjica (yellow card) 72'	Report	Matias (yellow card) 33'; Mahmudov 40'	Stadium: Bank Respublika Arena; Attendance: 6,600; Referee: İnqilab Məmmədov

31 May 2025 Final	Qarabağ	2–3 (a.e.t.)	Sabah	Sumgait
19:00 AZT (UTC+4)	Bayramov (penalty missed) 42'; Kady 45+1' (yellow card) 100'; Irazabal 67' (o.g.); Benzia (yellow card) FT (red card) 120'; Mustafazade (yellow card) 120+1'	Report	Lepinjica (yellow card) 28'; Šafranko 36' (pen.) (penalty missed) 57' (yellow card) 109'; Mutallimov (yellow card) 90' (goal) 119'; Parris 90+7'; Ələsgərov (yellow card) 110'; Pokatilov (yellow card) 120+2'	Stadium: City Stadium; Attendance: 7,513; Referee: İnqilab Məmmədov

=== Conference League ===
==== Qualifying rounds ====
25 July 2024 Second qualifying round 1st leg	Maccabi Haifa (Israel)	0–3	(Azerbaijan) Sabah	Kisvárda, Hungary
21:45 AZT (UTC+4)	Cornud (yellow card) 7'; Mohamed (yellow card) 36'; Sundgren (yellow card) 60'; Pierrot (yellow card) 86'	Report	Sekidika (yellow card) 53' (goal) 78'; Šafranko 61'; Aliyev 88'	Stadium: Kisvárdai Stadion; Attendance: 270; Referee: Nathan Verboomen (Belgium)
Note: Due to the Gaza war, Israeli teams were required to play their home matches at neutral venues until further notice.

1 August 2023 Second qualifying round 2nd leg	Sabah (Azerbaijan)	3–6 (a.e.t.) (6–6 agg.) (3–2 p)	(Israel) Maccabi Haifa	Baku, Azerbaijan
20:00 AZT (UTC+4)	Šafranko 47'; Parris 71'; Mickels (yellow card) 86' (goal) 103'; Camalov (yellow card) 86'; Ələsgərov (yellow card) 108'	Report	Haziza 17'; Pierrot 67', 90'; Šimić 70' (yellow card) 83'; Refaelov 73'; Elimelech (yellow card) 105+2'; David 112'	Stadium: Bank Respublika Arena; Attendance: 8,000; Referee: Peter Kralovič (Slovakia)
	Penalties
	Chakla (penalty scored); Mickels (penalty missed); Aliyev (penalty scored); Lepinjica (penalty scored)		(penalty scored) Refaelov; (penalty scored) David; (penalty missed) Saief; (penalty missed) Saba; (penalty missed) Pierrot

8 August 2023 Third qualifying round 1st leg	St Patrick's Athletic (Republic of Ireland)	1-0	(Azerbaijan) Sabah	Dublin, Republic of Ireland
21:45 AZT (UTC+4)	Palmer 35' (yellow card) 78'	Report	Lepinjica (yellow card) 27' (yellow-red card) 52'; Irazabal (yellow card) 31'; Dashdamirov (yellow card) 74'	Stadium: Tallaght Stadium; Attendance: 4,352; Referee: Vilhjálmur Thórarinsson (Iceland)

15 August 2023 Third qualifying round 2nd leg	Sabah (Azerbaijan)	0–1 (0–2 agg.)	(Republic of Ireland) St Patrick's Athletic	Baku, Azerbaijan
20:00 AZT (UTC+4)	Chakla (red card) 27'	Report	Elbouzedi 48'	Stadium: Bank Respublika Arena; Attendance: 6,132; Referee: Marcel Birsan (Romania)

== Squad statistics ==
As of match played 31 May 2025

=== Appearances and goals ===
No.	Pos	Nat	Player	Total		Premier League		Azerbaijan Cup		Conference League	
No.	Pos	Nat	Player	Apps	Goals	Apps	Goals	Apps	Goals	Apps	Goals
1	GK	(Azerbaijan) AZE	Yusif İmanov	20	0	15	0	1	0	4	0
2	DF	(Azerbaijan) AZE	Amin Seydiyev	33	2	24+2	1	3	1	4	0
3	DF	(Spain) ESP	Jon Irazabal	39	1	28+2	0	5	1	4	0
4	DF	(Morocco) MAR	Sofian Chakla	33	2	19+5	2	3+2	0	4	0
5	DF	(Azerbaijan) AZE	Rahman Dashdamirov	27	0	16+3	0	5	0	0+3	0
6	MF	(Azerbaijan) AZE	Abdulakh Khaybulayev	28	0	16+7	0	3+1	0	1	0
7	DF	(Bosnia and Herzegovina) BIH	Bojan Letić	38	1	23+7	1	2+2	0	4	0
8	MF	(Russia) RUS	Ayaz Guliyev	17	0	7+5	0	2+1	0	1+1	0
9	MF	(Azerbaijan) AZE	Anatoliy Nuriyev	35	2	10+19	1	1+4	1	0+1	0
10	MF	(Azerbaijan) AZE	Namiq Ələsgərov	28	2	14+8	2	1+1	0	0+4	0
11	MF	(Jamaica) JAM	Kaheem Parris	30	3	11+10	1	0+5	1	4	1
12	MF	(Luxembourg) LUX	Vincent Thill	13	1	3+8	1	0+2	0	0	0
13	MF	(Croatia) CRO	Ivan Lepinjica	31	1	23	1	4+1	0	3	0
15	MF	(Azerbaijan) AZE	Seymur Mammadov	10	0	4+4	0	1+1	0	0	0
17	DF	(Azerbaijan) AZE	Tellur Mutallimov	31	2	15+10	1	4+1	1	0+1	0
18	FW	(Slovakia) SVK	Pavol Šafranko	44	13	29+5	9	5+1	2	4	2
20	MF	(Germany) GER	Joy-Lance Mickels	34	11	17+7	9	2+4	1	4	1
22	MF	(Azerbaijan) AZE	Abdulla Rzayev	4	0	1+3	0	0	0	0	0
32	MF	(Azerbaijan) AZE	Elgun Dünyamaliyev	2	0	2	0	0	0	0	0
33	MF	(Uzbekistan) UZB	Umarali Rakhmonaliev	19	2	11+4	2	3+1	0	0	0
40	DF	(Brazil) BRA	Ygor Nogueira	27	2	23	2	4	0	0	0
55	GK	(Azerbaijan) AZE	Nijat Mehbaliyev	7	0	7	0	0	0	0	0
70	MF	(Nigeria) NGR	Jesse Sekidika	46	13	31+5	11	6	1	4	1
77	MF	(Azerbaijan) AZE	Shakir Seyidov	11	0	3+7	0	0	0	0+1	0
88	MF	(Azerbaijan) AZE	Khayal Aliyev	38	4	14+14	2	5+1	1	0+4	1
92	GK	(Kazakhstan) KAZ	Stas Pokatilov	19	0	14	0	5	0	0	0
99	FW	(Serbia) SRB	Njegoš Kupusović	25	2	5+16	1	1+1	1	0+2	0
Players away on loan:
33	FW	(Azerbaijan) AZE	Jamal Jafarov	1	0	0+1	0	0	0	0	0
Players who left Sabah during the season:
4	MF	(Azerbaijan) AZE	Elvin Camalov	18	0	11+2	0	0+1	0	3+1	0

=== Goal scorers ===
Place	Position	Nation	Number	Name	Premier League	Azerbaijan Cup	Conference League	Total
1	FW	(Nigeria)	70	Jesse Sekidika	11	1	1	13
1	FW	(Slovakia)	18	Pavol Šafranko	9	2	2	13
3	MF	(Germany)	20	Joy-Lance Mickels	9	1	1	11
4	MF	(Azerbaijan)	88	Khayal Aliyev	2	1	1	4
4				Own goal	3	1	0	4
6	MF	(Jamaica)	11	Kaheem Parris	1	1	1	3
7	MF	(Azerbaijan)	10	Namiq Ələsgərov	2	0	0	2
7	MF	(Uzbekistan)	33	Umarali Rakhmonaliev	2	0	0	2
7	DF	(Morocco)	4	Sofian Chakla	2	0	0	2
7	DF	(Brazil)	40	Ygor Nogueira	2	0	0	2
7	FW	(Serbia)	99	Njegoš Kupusović	1	1	0	2
7	DF	(Azerbaijan)	2	Amin Seydiyev	1	1	0	2
7	MF	(Azerbaijan)	9	Anatoliy Nuriyev	1	1	0	2
7	DF	(Azerbaijan)	17	Tellur Mutallimov	1	1	0	2
15	DF	(Croatia)	13	Ivan Lepinjica	1	0	0	1
15	DF	(Bosnia and Herzegovina)	7	Bojan Letić	1	0	0	1
15	MF	(Luxembourg)	12	Vincent Thill	1	0	0	1
15	DF	(Spain)	3	Jon Irazabal	0	1	0	1
				TOTALS	50	12	6	69

=== Clean sheets ===
Place	Position	Nation	Number	Name	Premier League	Azerbaijan Cup	Conference League	Total
1	GK	(Azerbaijan)	1	Yusif Imanov	4	0	1	5
2	GK	(Kazakhstan)	92	Stas Pokatilov	2	2	0	4
3	GK	(Azerbaijan)	55	Nijat Mehbaliyev	1	0	0	1
				TOTALS	7	2	1	10

=== Disciplinary record ===
Number	Nation	Position	Name	Premier League		Azerbaijan Cup		Conference League		Total	
Number	Nation	Position	Name	Booked	Sent off (straight red)	Booked	Sent off (straight red)	Booked	Sent off (straight red)	Booked	Sent off (straight red)
2	(Azerbaijan)	DF	Amin Seydiyev	5	0	0	0	0	0	5	0
3	(Spain)	DF	Jon Irazabal	3	0	0	0	1	0	4	0
4	(Morocco)	DF	Sofian Chakla	8	0	0	0	0	1	8	1
5	(Azerbaijan)	DF	Rahman Dashdamirov	2	0	0	0	1	0	3	0
6	(Azerbaijan)	MF	Abdulakh Khaybulayev	3	0	0	0	0	0	3	0
7	(Bosnia and Herzegovina)	DF	Bojan Letić	2	0	1	0	0	0	3	0
8	(Russia)	MF	Ayaz Guliyev	2	0	1	0	0	0	3	0
9	(Azerbaijan)	MF	Anatoliy Nuriyev	2	0	0	0	0	0	2	0
10	(Azerbaijan)	MF	Namiq Ələsgərov	3	0	1	0	1	0	5	0
12	(Luxembourg)	MF	Vincent Thill	1	0	0	0	0	0	1	0
13	(Croatia)	MF	Ivan Lepinjica	9	0	2	0	2	1	13	1
17	(Azerbaijan)	DF	Tellur Mutallimov	2	0	2	0	0	0	4	0
18	(Slovakia)	FW	Pavol Šafranko	3	1	2	0	0	0	5	1
20	(Germany)	MF	Joy-Lance Mickels	7	0	1	0	1	0	9	0
33	(Uzbekistan)	MF	Umarali Rakhmonaliev	2	0	0	0	0	0	2	0
40	(Brazil)	DF	Ygor Nogueira	6	1	0	0	0	0	6	1
70	(Nigeria)	FW	Jesse Sekidika	2	0	0	0	1	0	3	0
77	(Azerbaijan)	MF	Shakir Seyidov	1	0	0	0	0	0	1	0
88	(Azerbaijan)	MF	Khayal Aliyev	1	0	1	0	0	0	2	0
92	(Kazakhstan)	GK	Stas Pokatilov	0	0	1	0	0	0	1	0
99	(Serbia)	FW	Njegoš Kupusović	1	0	0	0	0	0	1	0
Players away on loan:
Players who left Sabah during the season:
4	(Azerbaijan)	MF	Elvin Camalov	2	0	0	0	1	0	3	0
			TOTALS	67	2	12	0	8	2	87	4
