= 2025–26 Azerbaijan Cup =

Tournament details
- Country: Azerbaijan
- Teams: 34

Final positions
- Champions: Sabah
- Runners-up: Zira

Tournament statistics
- Matches played: 39
- Goals scored: 121 (3.1 per match)
- Attendance: 48,990 (1,256 per match)
- All statistics correct as of 13 May 2026.

The 2025–26 Azerbaijan Cup, also named Bizon Azərbaycan Kuboku for sponsorship reasons, was the 34th season of the annual cup competition in Azerbaijan. The winners will qualify for the 2026–27 UEFA Europa League first qualifying round.

Sabah successfully defended their title after having won the previous edition.

== Teams ==
Access list for 2025–26 Azerbaijani Cup
	Teams entering in this round	Teams advancing from previous round
First round (12 teams)	12 Azerbaijan Second League teams	—N/a
Second round (24 teams)	10 Azerbaijan First League teams; 8 Azerbaijan Premier League teams	6 winners from the first round
Last 16 (16 teams)	4 Azerbaijan Premier League teams	12 winners from the second round
Quarter-finals (8 teams)	—N/a	8 winners from the last 16
Semi-finals (4 teams)	—N/a	4 winners from the quarter-finals
Final (2 teams)	—N/a	2 winners from the semi-finals

== First round ==
The draw for First, Second round and Last 16 was made on 18 September 2025.

9 October 2025 2	Sheki City	3–2	Araz Saatli	Baku
14:00 AZT (UTC+4)	Novruzov (yellow card) 32'; Ibrahimov (yellow card) 39'; Mehraliyev (yellow card) 45+1'; Nağdalıyev 46'; Imamverdiyev 87' (pen.); Suleymanov 89'	Report	Aliyev (yellow card) 36'; Yusubov 42'; Eyvazov (yellow card) 45+2' (yellow-red card) 86'; Avazov 65' (pen.)	Stadium: Rekord ARENA; Attendance: 50; Referee: Ruslan Quliyev

9 October 2025 3	Qaradağ Lökbatan	8–0	Aghdash	Lökbatan
14:00 AZT (UTC+4)	Zeynalov 19' (o.g.); Hüseynov 32'; Askerli 45+1'; Shahmuradov 66', 67', 70'; Hasanov (yellow card) 71'; Majidov 86'; Allahguliyev 90'	Report	Khalilov (yellow card) 5'; İsmayılov (yellow card) 51' (red card) FT; Paşayev (red card) 62'; Sariev (yellow card) 71' (yellow-red card) 76'; Zeynalov (yellow card) 75'	Stadium: Lökbatan Olympic Sport Complex Stadium; Attendance: 20; Referee: Şamil İmanzadə

9 October 2025 4	Dinamo Baku	3–2 (a.e.t.)	Kür-Araz	Baku
14:00 AZT (UTC+4)	Ismayilov (yellow card) 37'; Mammadli (yellow card) 42'; Safarzade 57'; Garayev 72', 99'; Iskhanzade (yellow card) 101'	Report	Mammadov 5', 49'; Mirbabayev (yellow card) 13'; Hasanli (yellow card) 26' (yellow-red card) 42'; Museyibov (yellow card) 42'; Yagubov (yellow card) 79'; Aliyev (yellow card) 84'; Guluzade (yellow card) 106' (yellow-red card) 120'	Stadium: Neftçi Football Center; Attendance: 40; Referee: Mahmud Bağırzadə

9 October 2025 5	Aghstafa Genjlari	1–0	Shirvan	Ağstafa
14:00 AZT (UTC+4)	Dukashvili (yellow card) 21'; Ismayilov (yellow card) 48'; Namazov 50'; Gahramanov (yellow card) 81'; Jalalzade (yellow card) 90+4'	Report	Museyibov (yellow card) 35'; Aliyev (yellow card) 50'; Mahmudov (yellow card) 73'	Stadium: Ağstafa Şəhər Stadionu; Attendance: 100; Referee: Alik Yunusov

10 October 2025 1	Goygol	1–0	Shamkir	Goygol
14:00 AZT (UTC+4)	Alizade 22'; Faraji (yellow card) 30'; Huseynzade (yellow card) 41'; Omarov (yellow card) 56'; Süleymanov (penalty missed) 72'; Karimov (yellow card) 77'; Mammadov (yellow card) 84'	Report	Rahimli (yellow card) 71'; Rajabli (yellow card) 82'	Stadium: Goygol OİK stadium Attendance: 80; Referee: Murad Səlimov

10 October 2025 6	Guba	1–2	Khankhedi	Guba
14:00 AZT (UTC+4)	Shabiyev 12' (o.g.); Kocharli (yellow card) 66'; Ibrahimli (yellow card) 68'; Hafizli (yellow card) 83'; Aslanov (yellow card) 88'	Report	Aghayev 69'; Guliyev 78' (pen.); Rahimov (yellow card) 86'	Stadium: Quba OİK Stadium; Attendance: 50; Referee: Emin Əliyev

== Second round ==
28 October 2025 8	Goygol	0–2	Baku Sporting	Buzovna
14:00 AZT (UTC+4)	Faraji (yellow card) 67'	Report	Allahverdiyev 40', 60'; Mammadli (yellow card) 47'	Stadium: Baku Sporting Arena; Attendance: 100; Referee: Namiq Bəkirov

28 October 2025 9	Karvan	3–1 (a.e.t.)	Sheki City	Yevlakh
14:00 AZT (UTC+4)	Irankhah 16'; Chachashvili (yellow card) 84' (yellow-red card) 99'; Thompson 105+1'; Mickels 118'	Report	Zeynalov (yellow card) 75'; Ibrahimov (yellow card) 79'; Novruzov 90+2'	Stadium: City Stadium; Attendance: 80; Referee: Emin Əliyev

28 October 2025 12	Cəbrayıl	0–3	Shafa Baku	Baku
14:00 AZT (UTC+4)	Dauda (yellow card) 66'	Report	Ebrahimzadeh 25', 44'; Mardanov (yellow card) 82'; Yunanov 85'	Stadium: ASKO Arena; Attendance: 30; Referee: Əkbər Əhmədov

28 October 2025 15	Kapaz	6–1	Aghstafa Genjlari	Qabala
14:00 AZT (UTC+4)	Aşurov 17'; Şahverdiyev (penalty missed) 26'; Hüseynli 35'; Shafiyev 41'; Abilov 44'; Ismayilov 63' (pen.); Dongo 85'	Report	Huseynov 69'; Aliyev (yellow card) 71'	Stadium: City Stadium; Attendance: 50; Referee: Rövşən Rəcəbov

28 October 2025 14	Dinamo Baku	0–5	Turan Tovuz	Baku
17:00 AZT (UTC+4)	Jafarzadeh (yellow card) 74'	Report	Wadji 19', 51'; Aliyev 24'; Guseynov 41'; Dadaşev 90'	Stadium: Azersun Arena; Attendance: 200; Referee: Əli Əliyev

28 October 2025 10	Qaradağ Lökbatan	2–3	İmişli	Quba
14:00 AZT (UTC+4)	Allahguliyev 28' (pen.), 69' (yellow card) 63'; Huseynov (yellow card) 73'	Report	Rahimzade 66'; Almeida (yellow card) 73'; Juninho 82' (pen.), 90+6'	Stadium: Quba OİK Stadium; Attendance: 20; Referee: Kamranbəy Rəhimov

29 October 2025 13	Şimal FK	0–2 (a.e.t.)	Shahdag Qusar	Şimal
14:00 AZT (UTC+4)	Samadov (yellow card) 20'; Badirov (yellow card) 73'; Nadirov (yellow card) 101'; Jalilov (yellow card) 109'	Report	Aliyev (yellow card) 26'; Voronsov (penalty missed) 94'; Alakbarli (yellow card) 95'; Amirguliyev (yellow card) 95'; Aliyev 102'; Agalarov 117'	Stadium: Şimal Stadium; Attendance: 20; Referee: Kamran Əliyev

29 October 2025 16	Khankhedi	1–2	Difai Ağsu	Agsu
14:00 AZT (UTC+4)	Quliyev 45+2'; Şəbiyev (yellow card) 58'; Rəhimov (yellow card) 75'; Teymurov (yellow card) 83'	Report	Musazada 61'; Qurbanov 71'; Mirsultanov (yellow card) 86'	Stadium: City Stadium; Attendance: 150; Referee: Nicat İsmayıllı

29 October 2025 17	Zagatala	0–3	Sumgayit	Zaqatala
14:00 AZT (UTC+4)	Müslümov (yellow card) 84'; Məmmədov (yellow card) 87'	Report	Ramalingom 8'; Haghverdi (yellow card) 11'; Ahmedzade 34'; Janković 85'	Stadium: City Stadium; Attendance: 500; Referee: Rauf Cabarov

29 October 2025 7	Sabail	0–1	Şamaxı	Baku
16:00 AZT (UTC+4)	Qasımov (yellow card) 83'	Report	Msanga 49'; Balau (penalty missed) 57'; Cézar (yellow card) 80'; Apolinario (yellow card) 90'	Stadium: ASKO Arena; Attendance: 150; Referee: Fərid Hacıyev

29 October 2025 11	Qabala	5–1	Mingəçevir	Qabala
16:00 AZT (UTC+4)	Massoumou 45'; Owusu 49', 54', 63'; Rashidov 66'; Sierra (yellow card) 67'; Amoah (yellow card) 90+2'	Report	Cəfərli (yellow card) 56'; Attuquaye 57'	Stadium: City Stadium; Attendance: 200; Referee: İslam Məmmədov

29 October 2025 18	Neftçi	6–2	MOİK	Baku
19:00 AZT (UTC+4)	Aboubakar 8', 42'; Qurbanly 27' (o.g.); M.Mammadov (yellow card) 30' (goal) 70'; Salyanski 62'; D'Almeida 83'; Kuč (yellow card) 86'	Report	Məhərrəmli (yellow card) 16'; E.Mammadov 45+2'; Camalov 48' (o.g.)	Stadium: Neftçi Arena; Attendance: 500; Referee: Vüqar Həsənli

== Last 16 ==
2 December 2025 23	Shahdag Qusar	1–2	Turan Tovuz	Sumgait
15:00 AZT (UTC+4)	Ahmədov (yellow card) 53'; Jamalov 76' (pen.)	Report	Guseynov 4' (pen.); Souza 64'; Olabe (yellow card) 75'	Stadium: Kapital Bank Arena; Attendance: 100; Referee: Rəvan Həmzəzadə

2 December 2025 26	Zira	1–0	Neftçi	Zirə
19:00 AZT (UTC+4)	Gomis (yellow card) 109'; Júnior 116' (yellow card) 117'	Report	Sambou (yellow card) 36'; D'Almeida (yellow card) 47'; Ribeiro (yellow card) 98'	Stadium: Zira Olympic Sport Complex Stadium; Attendance: 1,000; Referee: Tural Qurbanov

3 December 2025 21	İmişli	1–2 (a.e.t.)	Sabah	Baku
14:00 AZT (UTC+4)	Banguera (yellow card) 32'; Karaklajić (yellow card) 39'; Morgan (yellow card) 66'; Aliyev 89' (pen.); Rollo (yellow card) 120'	Report	Mickels 59' (yellow card) 95'; Parris 96'; Nogueira (yellow card) 106'; Malouda (yellow card) 115'	Stadium: Lökbatan Olympic Sport Complex Stadium; Attendance: 75; Referee: Kamal Umudlu

3 December 2025 19	Şamaxı	1–0	Baku Sporting	Shamakhi
14:00 AZT (UTC+4)	Apolinario (penalty missed) 68'; Shuaibu 69'	Report	Babayev (yellow card) 67'	Stadium: City Stadium; Attendance: 400; Referee: İnqilab Məmmədov

3 December 2025 20	Qarabağ	3–0	Karvan	Baku
19:00 AZT (UTC+4)	Janković (yellow card) 41'; Akhundzade 80', 88'; Yunuszade 83' (o.g.)	Report	Qadirzada (yellow card) 35'; Abdullayev (yellow card) 41'; Kings (yellow card) 57'; Yunuszade (yellow card) 88'	Stadium: Azersun Arena; Attendance: 550; Referee: Əliyar Ağayev

4 December 2025 22	Qabala	2–1	Shafa Baku	Qabala
15:00 AZT (UTC+4)	Sangaré 2', 53'	Report	Zamanov 6'; Mürsəlov (yellow card) 90+2'	Stadium: City Stadium; Attendance: 500; Referee: Əli Əliyev

4 December 2025 24	Araz-Naxçıvan	0–1 (a.e.t.)	Kapaz	Baku
19:00 AZT (UTC+4)	Ahmadzada (yellow card) 45+1'; Hasanalizade (yellow card) 98'	Report	Bento (yellow card) 31'; Hüseynli (yellow card) 88'; Ohori (yellow card) 90+3' (goal) 116'; Abilov (yellow card) 100'; Verdasca (yellow card) 120'	Stadium: Dalga Arena; Attendance: 250; Referee: Cavid Cəlilov

4 December 2025 25	Difai Ağsu	1–3	Sumgayit	Sumgait
19:00 AZT (UTC+4)	Qardasli 67'; Huseynov (yellow card) 74'; Huseynov (yellow card) 81' (yellow-red card) 83'	Report	Vásquez 9', 75' (pen.); Orucov (yellow card) 22'; Senhadji (yellow card) 35'; Ramalingom 90+2'	Stadium: City Stadium; Attendance: 1,200; Referee: Nicat İsmayıllı

== Quarter-finals ==
4 February 2026 First leg	Sumgayit	0–0	Zira	Sumgait
17:00	Vásquez (yellow card) 57'; Ninković (yellow card) 79'	Report	Júnior (yellow card) 90+3'	Stadium: City Stadium; Attendance: 400; Referee: Javid Jalilov

3 March 2026 Second leg	Zira	2–0 (2–0 agg.)	Sumgayit	Zirə
16:00	Volkovi 28'; İbrahimli (yellow card) 58'; Nuriyev 88'	Report	Haghverdi (yellow card) 69'; Ninković (red card) 83'	Stadium: Zira Olympic Sport Complex Stadium; Attendance: 600; Referee: Elçin Məsiyev

4 February 2026 First leg	Sabah	0–0	Qabala	Masazir
19:30	Sekidika (yellow card) 45+2'	Report	Massoumou (penalty missed) 29	Stadium: Bank Respublika Arena; Attendance: 300; Referee: Fərid Hacıyev

5 March 2026 Second leg	Qabala	3–3 (a.e.t.) (3–3 agg.) (2–4 p)	Sabah	Qabala
18:00	Ba Loua (red card) 48'; Aliyev (yellow card) 50'; Akinade 88', 90'; Rashidov 115', (yellow card) 116'	Report	Puchacz 31', 62'; Solvet (yellow card) 57'; Ygor Nogueira (yellow card) 61'; Mickels 104'	Stadium: City Stadium; Attendance: 300; Referee: Rəvan Həmzəzadə
	Penalties
	Sierra (penalty scored); Musayev (penalty missed); Massoumou (penalty scored); Isgandarov (penalty missed)		Mickels (penalty scored); Puchacz (penalty scored); Isayev (penalty scored); Parris (penalty scored)

5 February 2026 First leg	Şamaxı	2–1	Qarabağ	Shamakhi
14:30	Rossi (yellow card) 13' (goal) 26', 42'; Mammadov (yellow card) 77'	Report	Qurbanlı (yellow card) 45' (goal) 79'	Stadium: City Stadium; Attendance: 1,200; Referee: Kamranbəy Rəhimov

4 March 2026 Second leg	Qarabağ	3–1 (4–3 agg.)	Şamaxı	Baku
16:00	Addai 6', 61'; Andrade 63'	Report	Rossi (penalty missed) 32' 90+5'; Veremeev (yellow card) 47'; Fernandes (yellow card) 85'; Tîrcoveanu (yellow card) 90+3'	Stadium: Tofiq Bahramov Republican Stadium; Attendance: 750; Referee: Fərid Hacıyev

5 February 2026 First leg	Turan Tovuz	1–0	Kapaz	Baku
19:00	Silva (yellow card) 17'; Wadji (yellow card) 41'; Hurtado 57'	Report		Stadium: Azersun Arena; Attendance: 300; Referee: Əli Əliyev

5 March 2026 Second leg	Kapaz	0–2 (0–3 agg.)	Turan Tovuz	Yevlakh
14:30	Verdasca (yellow card) 31'; Şahverdiyev (yellow card) 45'	Report	Silva 13'; Hurtado 51'; Serrano (yellow card) 89'	Stadium: City Stadium; Attendance: 350; Referee: Cavid Cəlilov

== Semi-finals ==
3 April 2026 First Leg	Turan Tovuz	0–2	Zira	Sumgait
17:30 AZT (UTC+4)		Report	Renato (yellow card) 23'; Aydın 55' (yellow card) 81'; Mickels 89'; Silva (yellow card) 90+1'	Stadium: City Stadium; Attendance: 400; Referee: Əliyar Ağayev

21 April 2026 Second leg	Zira	0–0 (2–0 agg.)	Turan Tovuz	Zirə
19:00 AZT (UTC+4)	Aydın (yellow card) 70'; Alıyev (yellow card) 90+6'	Report	Jô (yellow card) 44'; Olabe (yellow card) 65'; Sadykhov (yellow card) 86'; Serrano (yellow card) 90+2'	Stadium: Zira Olympic Sport Complex Stadium; Attendance: 1,200; Referee: Əli Əliyev

3 April 2026 First Leg	Qarabağ	2–2	Sabah	Baku
20:00 AZT (UTC+4)	Kady 29', 60'; Montiel (yellow card) 47'; Cafarguliyev (yellow card) 80'	Report	Dashdamirov (yellow card) 14'; Rakhmonaliev 23', 65' (pen.); Isayev (yellow card) 86'	Stadium: Tofiq Bahramov Republican Stadium; Attendance: 21,000; Referee: Rauf Cabarov

22 April 2026 Second leg	Sabah	2–1 (4–3 agg.)	Qarabağ	Masazir
20:00 AZT (UTC+4)	Nogueira (yellow card) 11'; Solvet (yellow card) 11'; Pokatilov (yellow card) 17'; Malouda (yellow card) 44'; Simić 79'; Mbina 88'	Report	Kochalski (red card) 37'; Durán 59' (yellow card) 90+5'; Janković (yellow card) FT (yellow-red card) FT; Qurbanlı (yellow card) FT	Stadium: Bank Respublika Arena; Attendance: 8,730; Referee: Rəvan Həmzəzadə

== Final ==
13 May 2026	Zira	1–2	Sabah	Baku
20:00 AZT (UTC+4)	Alıyev (yellow card) 2'; Aydın 4'; Gomis (yellow card) 53'; Mutsinzi (yellow card) 76'	Report	Malouda (yellow card) 57'; Solvet (yellow card) 66'; Mbina 70'; Mickels 90+1'; Parris (yellow card) 90+6'	Stadium: Neftçi Arena; Attendance: 7,045; Referee: Elçin Məsiyev

== Scorers ==
As of match played 13 May 2026

3 goals:

- (Ghana) Prince Owusu - Qabala
- (Azerbaijan) Sabir Allahguliyev - Qaradağ Lökbatan
- (Azerbaijan) Rovshan Shahmuradov - Qaradağ Lökbatan
- (Rwanda) Joy-Lance Mickels - Sabah
- (Switzerland) Karim Rossi - Şamaxı

2 goals:

- (Azerbaijan) İlham Allahverdiyev - Baku Sporting
- (Azerbaijan) Yadigar Garayev - Dinamo Baku
- (Brazil) Juninho - İmişli
- (Azerbaijan) Emin Guliyev - Khankhedi
- (Azerbaijan) Elkhan Mammadov - Kür-Araz
- (Cameroon) Vincent Aboubakar - Neftçi
- (Azerbaijan) Nuqay Rashidov - Qabala
- (France) Ibrahim Sangaré - Qabala
- (Nigeria) Ismahil Akinade - Qabala
- (Azerbaijan) Nariman Akhundzade - Qarabağ
- (Brazil) Kady Borges - Qarabağ
- (Ghana) Emmanuel Addai - Qarabağ
- (Gabon) Orphé Mbina - Sabah
- (Poland) Tymoteusz Puchacz - Sabah
- (Uzbekistan) Umarali Rakhmonaliev - Sabah
- (Iran) Amir Ebrahimzadeh - Shafa Baku
- (Dominican Republic) Ronaldo Vásquez - Sumgayit
- (Madagascar) Alexandre Ramalingom - Sumgayit
- (Azerbaijan) Aykhan Guseynov - Turan Tovuz
- (Colombia) Haiderson Hurtado - Turan Tovuz
- (France) Ibrahima Wadji - Turan Tovuz
- (Turkey) Eren Aydın - Zira

1 goals:

- (Azerbaijan) Eltaj Huseynov - Aghstafa Genjlari
- (Azerbaijan) Elgun Namazov - Aghstafa Genjlari
- (Azerbaijan) Ravan Avazov - Araz Saatli
- (Azerbaijan) Yaqub Yusubov - Araz Saatli
- (Azerbaijan) Akbar Safarzade - Dinamo Baku
- (Azerbaijan) Musa Musazada - Difai Ağsu
- (Azerbaijan) Bayrameli Qurbanov - Difai Ağsu
- (Azerbaijan) Kamil Qardasli - Difai Ağsu
- (Azerbaijan) Raul Alizade - Goygol
- (Azerbaijan) Ibrahim Aliyev - İmişli
- (Azerbaijan) Elmir Rahimzade - İmişli
- (Azerbaijan) Eljan Abilov - Kapaz
- (Azerbaijan) Şahmar Aşurov - Kapaz
- (Azerbaijan) Rauf Hüseynli - Kapaz
- (Azerbaijan) Shahnur Ismayilov - Kapaz
- (Azerbaijan) Sadiq Shafiyev - Kapaz
- (Ivory Coast) Donald Dongo - Kapaz
- (Japan) Ryonosuke Ohori - Kapaz
- (Rwanda) Joy-Slayd Mickels - Karvan
- (Iran) Saeed Irankhah - Karvan
- (Nigeria) Gavi Thompson - Karvan
- (Azerbaijan) Sarkhan Aghayev - Khankhedi
- (Ghana) Jonah Attuquaye - Mingəçevir
- (Azerbaijan) Elmar Mammadov - MOİK
- (Azerbaijan) Murad Mammadov - Neftçi
- (Azerbaijan) Agadadash Salyanski - Neftçi
- (Benin) Sessi D'Almeida - Neftçi
- (Cameroon) Domi Massoumou - Qabala
- (Azerbaijan) Musa Qurbanlı - Qarabağ
- (Cape Verde) Leandro Andrade - Qarabağ
- (Colombia) Camilo Durán - Qarabağ
- (Azerbaijan) Elmin Askerli - Qaradağ Lökbatan
- (Azerbaijan) Vüsal Hüseynov - Qaradağ Lökbatan
- (Azerbaijan) Aykhan Majidov - Qaradağ Lökbatan
- (Jamaica) Kaheem Parris - Sabah
- (Serbia) Veljko Simić - Sabah
- (Azerbaijan) Amil Yunanov - Shafa Baku
- (Azerbaijan) Emin Zamanov - Shafa Baku
- (Nigeria) Abdullahi Shuaibu - Şamaxı
- (Tanzania) Alphonce Msanga - Şamaxı
- (Azerbaijan) Seymur Aliyev - Shahdag Qusar
- (Azerbaijan) Sanan Agalarov - Shahdag Qusar
- (Azerbaijan) Famil Jamalov - Shahdag Qusar
- (Azerbaijan) Javid Imamverdiyev - Sheki City
- (Azerbaijan) Ümid Nağdalıyev - Sheki City
- (Azerbaijan) Nurlan Novruzov - Sheki City
- (Azerbaijan) Saleh Suleymanov - Sheki City
- (Azerbaijan) Nihad Ahmedzade - Sumgayit
- (Serbia) Aleksa Janković - Sumgayit
- (Azerbaijan) Şehriyar Aliyev - Turan Tovuz
- (Azerbaijan) Murad Dadaşev - Turan Tovuz
- (Brazil) Alex Souza - Turan Tovuz
- (Portugal) Jorge Silva - Turan Tovuz
- (Azerbaijan) Ceyhun Nuriyev - Zira
- (Brazil) Martins Júnior - Zira
- (Georgia (country)) Davit Volkovi - Zira
- (Rwanda) Leroy-Jacques Mickels - Zira

Own goals:

- (Azerbaijan) Taryel Zeynalov - for Qaradağ Lökbatan vs Aghdash 9 October 2025
- (Azerbaijan) Aliakbar Shabiyev - for Guba vs Khankhedi 10 October 2025
- (Azerbaijan) Nihad Qurbanly - for Neftçi vs MOİK 29 October 2025
- (Azerbaijan) Elvin Camalov - for MOİK vs Neftçi 29 October 2025
- (Azerbaijan) Elvin Yunuszade - for Qarabağ vs Karvan 3 December 2025
