= Ygor Nogueira =

Brazilian footballer

Personal information
- Full name: João Nogueira de Paula
- Date of birth: 27 March 1995 (age 31)
- Place of birth: Itaperuna, Brazil
- Height: 1.87 m (6 ft 2 in)
- Position: Centre-back

Team information
- Current team: Rostov
- Number: 40

Youth career
- 2007–2014: Fluminense

Senior career*
Years	Team	Apps	(Gls)
2014–2019	Fluminense	17	(0)
2014–2015	→ Gent (loan)	0	(0)
2018	→ Figueirense (loan)	39	(5)
2019	→ CRB (loan)	0	(0)
2019–2021	Gil Vicente	46	(0)
2021–2022	Mazatlán	11	(0)
2022	→ Juventude (loan)	5	(0)
2023	Santa Clara	12	(1)
2023–2024	Chaves	21	(0)
2024–2026	Sabah	47	(4)
2026–	Rostov	13	(0)
- * Club domestic league appearances and goals as of 8 November 2026

Ygor Nogueira de Paula (born 27 March 1995) is a Brazilian professional footballer who plays as a centre-back for Russian Premier League club Rostov.

== Club career ==
Born in Itaperuna, Nogueira joined the youth academy of Fluminense in 2007 at the age of 12. On 1 September 2014, he was loaned out to Belgian club K.A.A. Gent.

In November 2015, Nogueira made his first team debut for Flu; playing the whole ninety minutes of a 1–1 draw against Internacional in Série A. In the 2017 season he broke into the first team following an injury to Renato Chaves; but was soon replaced by Reginaldo.

On 21 December 2017, Nogueira joined Figueirense on a season long loan deal.

In January 2023, Nogueira signed a contract with Santa Clara in Portugal until the end of 2022–23 season, with a conditional automatic extension option.

On 18 July 2023, after his contract with Santa Clara had expired, Nogueira signed for Primeira Liga side Chaves.

On 10 August 2024, Nogueira signed a two-year contract with Azerbaijan Premier League side Sabah.

On 1 July 2026, Nogueira moved to Rostov in Russia on a two-year deal.

== Career statistics ==
As of 8 November 2026

Club	Season	League			Cup		Continental		Other		Total	
Club	Season	Division	Apps	Goals	Apps	Goals	Apps	Goals	Apps	Goals	Apps	Goals
Gent (loan)	2014–15	Belgian Pro League	0	0	1	0	—		—		1	0
Fluminense	2015	Série A	2	0	0	0	—		—		2	0
Fluminense	2016	Série A	2	0	0	0	—		2 (Note: One appearance in Campeonato Carioca, one appearance in Primeira Liga)	0	4	0
Fluminense	2017	Série A	11	0	3	1	2 (Note: Appearances in Copa Sudamericana)	0	8 (Note: One appearance in Campeonato Carioca, five appearances, one goal in Taça Rio, two appearances in Primeira Liga)	1	24	2
Fluminense	Total		15	0	3	1	2	0	10	1	30	2
Figueirense (loan)	2018	Série B	28	3	4	0	—		11 (Note: Appearances in Campeonato Catarinense)	2	43	5
CRB (loan)	2019	Série B	0	0	—		—		—		0	0
Gil Vicente	2019–20	Primeira Liga	22	0	2	0	—		3 (Note: Appearances in Taça da Liga)	0	27	0
Gil Vicente	2020–21	Primeira Liga	24	0	3	0	—		—		27	0
Gil Vicente	Total		46	0	5	0	0	0	3	0	54	0
Mazatlán	2021–22	Liga MX	11	0	—		—		—		11	0
Mazatlán	2022–23	Liga MX	0	0	—		—		—		0	0
Mazatlán	Total		11	0	0	0	0	0	0	0	11	0
Juventude (loan)	2022	Série A	5	0	—		—		—		5	0
Santa Clara	2022–23	Primeira Liga	12	1	—		—		—		12	1
Chaves	2023–24	Primeira Liga	21	0	0	0	—		1	0	22	0
Sabah	2024–25	Azerbaijan Premier League	23	2	4	0	0	0	—		27	2
Sabah	2025–26	Azerbaijan Premier League	24	2	5	0	6 (Note: Two appearances in UEFA Europa League, four appearances in UEFA Conference League)	0	—		35	2
Sabah	Total		47	4	9	0	6	0	0	0	62	4
Rostov	2026–27	Russian Premier League	13	0	2	0	—		—		15	0
Career total			198	8	24	1	8	0	25	3	255	12

== Honours ==
Fluminense

- Primeira Liga: 2016

Sabah

- Azerbaijan Premier League: 2025–26
- Azerbaijan Cup: 2024–25, 2025–26
