= Jamalov =

Jamalov is a surname. Notable people with the surname include:

- Famil Jamalov (born 1998), Azerbaijani footballer
- Yavar Jamalov (1949–2018), Azerbaijani politician
