= Kaheem Parris =

Jamaican footballer (born 2000)

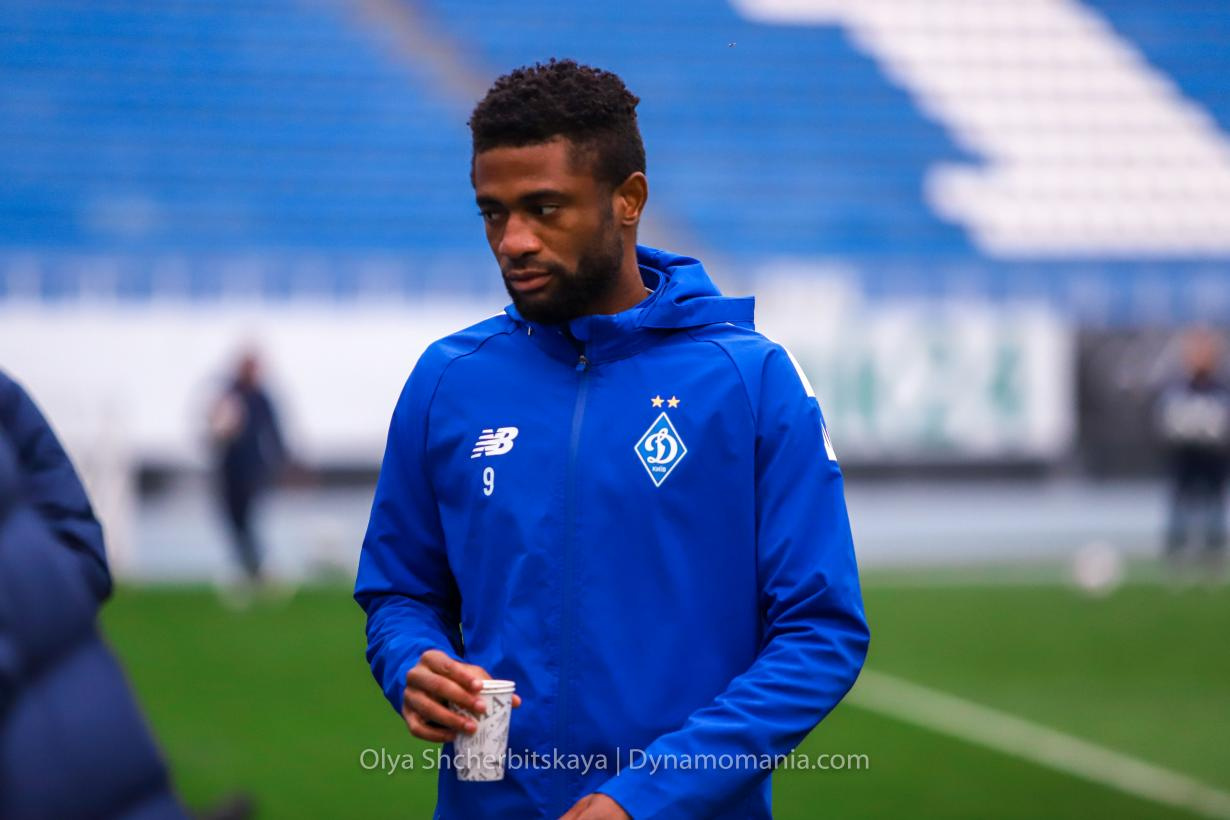
- Parris in 2022

Personal information
- Full name: Kaheem Anthony Parris
- Date of birth: 6 January 2000 (age 26)
- Place of birth: Kingston, Jamaica
- Height: 1.84 m (6 ft 0 in)
- Position: Winger

Team information
- Current team: Sabah
- Number: 11

Senior career*
Years	Team	Apps	(Gls)
2017–2021	Cavalier	39	(8)
2019–2020	→ Domžale (loan)	1	(0)
2020	→ Krka (loan)	1	(1)
2020–2021	→ Krka (loan)	19	(16)
2021–2022	Koper	41	(11)
2022–2024	Dynamo Kyiv	13	(0)
2023–2024	→ Sabah (loan)	29	(4)
2024–	Sabah	51	(8)

International career^{‡}
- Jamaica U17
- Jamaica U20
2019	Jamaica U23	3	(0)
2017–	Jamaica	10	(0)
- * Club domestic league appearances and goals as of 22 June 2026 ‡ National team caps and goals as of 2 November 2026

Kaheem Anthony Parris (born 6 January 2000) is a Jamaican professional footballer who plays as a winger for Azerbaijan Premier League club Sabah.

== Early life ==
Originally from Saint Ann Parish on the north coast of Jamaica, Parris attended Dinthill Technical High School.

== Club career ==
In 2017, Parris made his Jamaican National Premier League debut for Cavalier, a club based in the capital city of Kingston. In January 2018, he scored three goals in three consecutive games.

In September 2019, Parris was loaned to the Slovenian top division side Domžale. However, he made only one appearance for the club and soon left on loan to Slovenian second division club Krka. In July 2020, Parris signed a new season-long loan deal with Krka. He was the top goalscorer of the Slovenian second division with 16 goals.

In July 2021, Parris signed a two-year contract with Slovenian top division team Koper.

On 2 September 2022, Parris transferred to Ukrainian Premier League side Dynamo Kyiv for a transfer fee believed to be over €1 million, which became the new record departure for Koper. He signed a four-year contract with Dynamo, with an option for another year.

On 6 September 2023, Azerbaijan Premier League club Sabah announced the season-long loan signing of Parris from Dynamo Kyiv.

On 24 June 2024, Parris signed a four-year contract with Sabah.

== International career ==
Parris made his Jamaica under-17 team debut in 2016 in CFU qualifying. Parris also played in the 2017 CONCACAF U17 final rounds. He was part of the Jamaica under-20 team at the 2018 CONCACAF U-20 Championship, and made his senior national team debut in August 2017.

He has also played for the under-23 team at the 2019 Pan American Games.

== Career statistics ==
As of match played 3 December 2025

Appearances and goals by club, season and competition
Club	Season	League			National cup (Note: Includes JFF Champions Cup, Slovenian Cup, Ukrainian Cup, Azerbaijan Cup)		Continental		Other		Total	
Club	Season	Division	Apps	Goals	Apps	Goals	Apps	Goals	Apps	Goals	Apps	Goals
Cavalier	2017–18	Jamaica Premier League	19	5	0	0	—		—		19	5
Cavalier	2018–19	Jamaica Premier League	20	3	0	0	—		—		20	3
Cavalier	2019–20	Jamaica Premier League	0	0	0	0	—		—		0	0
Cavalier	2020–21	Jamaica Premier League	0	0	0	0	—		—		0	0
Cavalier	Total		39	8	0	0	0	0	0	0	39	8
Domžale (loan)	2019–20	1. SNL	1	0	0	0	0	0	—		1	0
Krka (loan)	2019–20	2. SNL	1	1	0	0	—		—		1	1
Krka (loan)	2020–21	2. SNL	19	16	0	0	—		2 (Note: Appearances in Slovenian Second League promotion/relegation play-offs)	1	21	17
Koper	2021–22	1. SNL	34	10	4	2	—		—		38	12
Koper	2022–23	1. SNL	7	1	0	0	2 (Note: Appearance(s) in UEFA Europa Conference League)	0	—		9	1
Koper	Total		41	11	4	2	2	0	0	0	47	13
Dynamo Kyiv	2022–23	Ukrainian Premier League	13	0	0	0	1 (Note: Appearance in UEFA Europa League)	0	—		14	0
Dynamo Kyiv	2023–24	Ukrainian Premier League	0	0	0	0	1	0	—		1	0
Dynamo Kyiv	Total		13	0	0	0	2	0	0	0	15	0
Sabah (loan)	2023–24	Azerbaijan Premier League	29	4	2	0	0	0	—		31	4
Sabah	2024–25	Azerbaijan Premier League	21	1	5	1	4	1	—		30	3
Sabah	2025–26	Azerbaijan Premier League	11	2	1	1	4 (Note: One appearance in UEFA Europa League, three appearance and one goal in UEFA Conference League)	1	—		16	4
Sabah	Total		32	3	6	2	8	2	0	0	46	7
Career total			175	43	12	4	12	2	2	1	201	50

== Honours ==
Sabah

- Azerbaijan Premier League: 2025–26
- Azerbaijan Cup: 2024–25, 2025–26
