= Gurban Safarov =

Azerbaijani footballer (born 2004)

Personal information
- Full name: Gurban Elbrus oglu Safarov
- Date of birth: 5 September 2004 (age 22)
- Place of birth: Azerbaijan
- Height: 1.77 m (5 ft 10 in)
- Position: Midfielder

Senior career*
Years	Team	Apps	(Gls)
2021–2024	Shamakhi	36	(0)

International career^{‡}
2022	Azerbaijan U19	2	(0)
2024–	Azerbaijan U21	5	(0)
- * Club domestic league appearances and goals as of 19 December 2024 ‡ National team caps and goals as of 15 October 2024

Gurban Safarov (Azerbaijani: Qurban Səfərov; born 5 September 2004) is an Azerbaijani footballer who plays as a midfielder for Shamakhi in the Azerbaijan Premier League.

== Club career ==
On 27 November 2021, Safarov made his debut in the Azerbaijan Premier League for Shamakhi match against Sabah. On 24 December 2024, his contract with Shamakhi was terminated.
