= Aaron Malouda =

French footballer (born 2005)

Personal information
- Date of birth: 30 November 2005 (age 20)
- Place of birth: Écully, France
- Height: 1.83 m (6 ft 0 in)
- Positions: Winger; attacking midfielder

Team information
- Current team: Basel
- Number: 17

Youth career
- 2013–2017: Lyon
- 2017–2020: FC Lyon
- 2020–2021: Rennes

Senior career*
Years	Team	Apps	(Gls)
2021–2023	Rennes II	23	(3)
2023–2026	Lille II	28	(7)
2023–2026	Lille	2	(0)
2025	→ Nîmes (loan)	10	(0)
2025–2026	→ Sabah (loan)	11	(2)
2026	Sabah	13	(7)
2026–	Basel	5	(0)

International career^{‡}
2023	France U19	5	(0)
- * Club domestic league appearances and goals as of 28 September 2026 ‡ National team caps and goals as of 17 October 2023

Aaron Malouda (born 30 November 2005) is a French professional footballer who plays as a winger or attacking midfielder for Swiss Super League club Basel.

== Early life ==
Malouda is the son of the French Guiana international footballer Florent Malouda, and nephew of the French Guiana footballer Lesly Malouda. He lived in London during his father’s time with Chelsea and was in the same football programme as Richard Olise.

== Club career ==
Malouda is a product of the youth academies of Lyon and FC Lyon, before moving to Rennes' youth academy on 19 December 2019. He began his senior career with the reserves of Rennes in the Championnat National 3 in 2021. On 1 July 2023, he transferred to Lille on a professional contract until 2023. He made his professional debut with the senior Lille team as a late substitute in a 2–0 Ligue 1 win over Le Havre on 1 October 2023.

On 3 February 2025, Malouda was loaned to Nîmes in Championnat National. On 11 September 2025, he joined Azerbaijan Premier League club Sabah on loan. On 10 January 2026, Lille announced Malouda would be joining Sabah on a permanent basis.

On 29 July 2026, Malouda moved to Basel in Switzerland on a four-year contract.

== International career ==
Malouda was born in France, and is of French Guianian descent. He is a youth international for France, having played for the France U19s in 2023.

== Career statistics ==
As of match played 25 January 2025

Appearances and goals by club, season, and competition
Club	Season	League			Coupe de France		Europe		Other		Total	
Club	Season	Division	Apps	Goals	Apps	Goals	Apps	Goals	Apps	Goals	Apps	Goals
Rennes B	2021–22	National 3	4	0	—		—		—		4	0
Rennes B	2022–23	National 3	19	3	—		—		—		19	3
Rennes B	Total		23	3	—		—		—		23	3
Lille B	2023–24	National 3	20	4	—		—		—		20	4
Lille B	2024–25	National 3	8	3	—		—		—		8	3
Lille B	Total		28	7	—		—		—		28	7
Lille	2023–24	Ligue 1	1	0	1	0	1 (Note: Appearance in UEFA Conference League)	0	—		3	0
Lille	2024–25	Ligue 1	1	0	0	0	0	0	—		1	0
Lille	Total		2	0	1	0	1	0	0	0	4	0
Career total			53	10	1	0	1	0	0	0	55	10

== Honours ==
Sabah

- Azerbaijan Premier League: 2025–26
- Azerbaijan Cup: 2025–26
