= Rovshan Shahmuradov =

Azerbaijani footballer (born 1999)

Personal information
- Date of birth: 11 May 1999 (age 27)
- Place of birth: Azerbaijan
- Height: 1.78 m (5 ft 10 in)
- Position: Midfielder

Team information
- Current team: Shamkir
- Number: 11

Senior career*
Years	Team	Apps	(Gls)
2018–2021	Qaradağ Lökbatan		
2021–2022	Turan Tovuz		
2022–2024	Shamakhi	26	(1)
2024	Karvan		
2024–	Shamkir		
- * Club domestic league appearances and goals as of 27 May 2023

Rovshan Shahmuradov (Azerbaijani: Rövşən Şahmuradov; born 11 May 1999) is an Azerbaijani footballer who plays as a midfielder for Shamkir.

== Club career ==
On 2 October 2022, Shahmuradov made his debut in the Azerbaijan Premier League for Shamakhi match against Sabah.
