= Steve Solvet =

Guadeloupean footballer (born 1996)

Personal information
- Full name: Steve Loic Solvet
- Date of birth: 20 March 1996 (age 30)
- Place of birth: Les Abymes, Guadeloupe
- Height: 1.91 m (6 ft 3 in)
- Position: Centre-back

Team information
- Current team: Sabah
- Number: 3

Youth career
- 2000–2009: Intrépide de Saint Anne
- 2009–2011: Creps Antilles-Guyane
- 2011–2013: Intrépide de Saint Anne
- 2013–2014: Bischheim

Senior career*
Years	Team	Apps	(Gls)
2014–2018	Strasbourg II	42	(0)
2018–2019	Dijon II	24	(5)
2019–2020	Bergerac	4	(0)
2020–2022	Sète	41	(0)
2022–2024	Orléans	54	(3)
2024–2025	Martigues	27	(3)
2025–	Sabah	30	(5)

International career^{‡}
2017–	Guadeloupe	11	(2)
- * Club domestic league appearances and goals as of 22 June 2026 ‡ National team caps and goals as of 03:44, 6 July 2021 (UTC)

Steve Loic Solvet (born 20 March 1996) is a French professional footballer who plays as a centre-back for Azerbaijan Premier League club Sabah and the Guadeloupe national team.

== Career ==
Solvet began playing football in his native Guadeloupe with his local club Intrépide de Saint Anne, and passed through the youth academies of Creps Antilles-Guyane and Bischheim in France. He began his senior career with the reserve sides of Strasbourg and Dijon, signing a professional contract with the former. In 2019, he had a stint with Bergerac, before joining Sète in the Championnat National in the summer of 2020.

In June 2022, Solvet agreed to sign with Orléans.

== International career ==
Solvet debuted with the Guadeloupe team in a 2–1 friendly win over Martinique on 23 June 2021. He was called up to represent Guadeloupe at the 2021 CONCACAF Gold Cup.

== Honours ==
Sabah

- Azerbaijan Premier League: 2025–26
- Azerbaijan Cup: 2025–26
