= Khayal Aliyev (footballer) =

Azerbaijani footballer (born 2004)

Personal information
- Full name: Khayal Aliyev
- Date of birth: 18 February 2004 (age 22)
- Place of birth: Azerbaijan
- Height: 1.78 m (5 ft 10 in)
- Position: Midfielder

Team information
- Current team: Sabah
- Number: 9

Youth career
- Sabah

Senior career*
Years	Team	Apps	(Gls)
2024–	Sabah	69	(8)

International career^{‡}
2021	Azerbaijan U19	3	(0)
2023–2024	Azerbaijan U21	6	(0)
2025–	Azerbaijan	10	(0)
- * Club domestic league appearances and goals as of 22 June 2026 ‡ National team caps and goals as of 17:00, 15 November 2026 (UTC)

Khayal Aliyev (Azerbaijani: Xəyal Əliyev; born 18 February 2004) is an Azerbaijani professional footballer who plays as a midfielder for Azerbaijan Premier League club Sabah and the Azerbaijan national team.

== Career ==
On 3 February 2024, Aliyev made his Azerbaijan Premier League debut for Sabah in a game against Turan Tovuz.

== Honours ==
Sabah

- Azerbaijan Premier League: 2025–26
- Azerbaijan Cup: 2024–25, 2025–26
