= Rahman Dashdamirov =

Azerbaijani footballer (born 1999)

Personal information
- Full name: Rahman Nazim oglu Dashdamirov
- Date of birth: 20 October 1999 (age 27)
- Place of birth: Azerbaijan
- Position: Centre-back

Team information
- Current team: Sabah
- Number: 5

Youth career
- Neftçi Baku

Senior career*
Years	Team	Apps	(Gls)
2019–2021	MOIK Baku	0	(0)
2021–2023	Shamakhi	42	(1)
2023–	Sabah	50	(1)

International career^{‡}
2017	Azerbaijan U19	5	(0)
2025–	Azerbaijan	12	(1)
- * Club domestic league appearances and goals as of 22 June 2026 ‡ National team caps and goals as of 15 November 2026

Rahman Nazim oglu Dashdamirov (Azerbaijani: Rəhman Daşdəmirov; born 20 October 1999) is an Azerbaijani professional footballer who plays as a defender for Azerbaijan Premier League club Sabah and the Azerbaijan national team.

== Club career ==
On 28 February 2022, Dashdamirov made his debut in the Azerbaijan Premier League for Shamakhi in a match against Qarabağ.

== International goals ==
Scores and results list Azerbaijan's goal tally first, score column indicates score after each Dashdamirov goal.

List of international goals scored by Rahman Dashdamirov
No.	Date	Venue	Opponent	Score	Result	Competition
1	9 June 2026	Haladás Sportkomplexum, Szombathely, Hungary	San Marino	1–1	2–1	Friendly

== Honours ==
Sabah

- Azerbaijan Premier League: 2025–26
- Azerbaijan Cup: 2024–25, 2025–26
