= Juninho (footballer, born 2003) =

Brazilian footballer

Personal information
- Full name: Luiz Fernando Silvestre Junior
- Date of birth: 29 March 2003 (age 23)
- Place of birth: Assis, Brazil
- Height: 1.78 m (5 ft 10 in)
- Position: Midfielder

Team information
- Current team: Imishli
- Number: 7

Youth career
- Trieste
- 2017–2021: Athletico Paranaense

Senior career*
Years	Team	Apps	(Gls)
2021–	Athletico Paranaense	20	(1)
2023	→ Mirassol (loan)	2	(0)
2024	→ Cianorte (loan)	?	(?)
2024	→ Aparecidense (loan)	15	(0)
2025–	Imishli	29	(2)
- * Club domestic league appearances and goals as of 22 June 2026

Luiz Fernando Silvestre Junior (born 29 March 2003), commonly known as Juninho, is a Brazilian footballer who plays as a midfielder for Imishli FK.

== Club career ==
Born in Assis, São Paulo, Juninho joined Athletico Paranaense's youth setup in 2017, from Trieste FC. On 7 May 2021, he renewed his contract with the club until April 2026.

Juninho made his first team debut on 1 September 2021, coming on as a late substitute for fellow youth graduate Khellven in a 1–1 Campeonato Paranaense home draw against FC Cascavel. He made his Série A debut on 3 October, replacing Carlos Eduardo late into a 0–3 away loss against Flamengo.

On 1 August 2025, Juninho signed a two-year contract with Azerbaijan Premier League side Imishli FK.

== Career statistics ==
As of 13 October 2021.

Club	Season	League			State league		Cup		Continental		Other		Total	
Club	Season	Division	Apps	Goals	Apps	Goals	Apps	Goals	Apps	Goals	Apps	Goals	Apps	Goals
Athletico Paranaense	2021	Série A	1	0	2	0	0	0	0	0	—		3	0
Career total			1	0	2	0	0	0	0	0	0	0	3	0
