= 2024–25 Azerbaijan Cup =

Tournament details
- Country: Azerbaijan
- Teams: 34

Final positions
- Champions: Sabah (1st title)
- Runners-up: Qarabağ

Tournament statistics
- Matches played: 39
- Goals scored: 136 (3.49 per match)
- All statistics correct as of 31 May 2025.

The 2024–25 Azerbaijan Cup was the 33rd season of the annual cup competition in Azerbaijan. The winners qualified for the 2025–26 UEFA Europa League first qualifying round.

Sabah won the cup on 31 May 2025 (their first Azerbaijan Cup win), beating cup holders Qarabağ 3–2 in the final.

== Teams ==
Access list for 2024–25 Azerbaijani Cup
	Teams entering in this round	Teams advancing from previous round
First round (14 teams)	14 Azerbaijan Second League teams	—N/a
Second round (22 teams)	10 Azerbaijan First League teams; 5 Azerbaijan Premier League teams	7 winners from the first round
Last 16 (16 teams)	5 Azerbaijan Premier League teams	11 winners from the second round
Quarter-finals (8 teams)	—N/a	8 winners from the last 16
Semi-finals (4 teams)	—N/a	4 winners from the quarter-finals
Final (2 teams)	—N/a	2 winners from the semi-finals

== First round ==
The draw for First, Second round and Last 16 was made on 30 September 2024. On 10 October, the AFFA published the list of referee appointments for the First round.

12 October 2024 1	Shahdag Qusar	3–1	Kür-Araz	Shamakhi
14:00 AZT (UTC+4)	Jamalov 73', 77'; Quliyev 79'	Report	Mammadov 9'	Stadium: Şamaxı OIK Stadium; Referee: Islam Mammadov

12 October 2024 5	Shafa Baku	2–0	Saatli-Araz	Baku
16:30 AZT (UTC+4)	Nasibov 9'; Rahimli 34'	Report		Stadium: ASK Arena; Referee: Rovshan Rajabov

13 October 2024 7	Shimal	4–1	Qusar	Siyazan
14:00 AZT (UTC+4)	Azadov 6', 45+1'; Askarov 82'; Nasibov 89'	Report	Aghalarov 70' (pen.)	Stadium: Siyazan Stadium; Referee: Sabuhi Bayramov

13 October 2024 4	Lerik	0–4	Ağdaş	Lankaran
14:00 AZT (UTC+4)		Report	Suleymanov 55'; Ismailov 59', 66'; Sariyev 89'	Stadium: Lankaran OİK Stadium; Referee: Murad Salimov

13 October 2024 2	Sheky City	0–1	Shamkir	Shaki
14:00 AZT (UTC+4)		Report	Taghiyev 35'	Stadium: City Stadium; Referee: Vugar Hasanli

13 October 2024 6	Göygöl	2–3	Hypers	Goygol
15:00 AZT (UTC+4)	Jalilov 37' (pen.), 56'	Report	Imamverdiyev 6', 90' Valiyev 94' (o.g.)	Stadium: Goygol OİK stadium Referee: Elvin Bayramov

14 October 2024 3	Dinamo	4–0	Füzuli	Baku
13:30 AZT (UTC+4)	Isayev 38', 77'; Ahmadov 80'; Seyidov 90+2'	Report		Stadium: Neftçi Football Center; Referee: Ruslan Guliyev

== Second round ==
On 26 October, the AFFA published the list of referee appointments for the Second round.

28 October 2024 17	Turan Tovuz	7–2	Hypers	Tovuz
20:00 AZT (UTC+4)	Əhmədov 14' (o.g.); Huseynov 16', 26'; Souza 41', 41'; Guliyev 57'; Aliyev 63'	Report	68', 70' Alakbarov	Stadium: Tovuz City Stadium; Referee: Akbar Ahmadov

29 October 2024 18	MOIK Baku	3–1	Shimal	Sumgait
14:00 AZT (UTC+4)	Tagiyev 17'; Soltanov 55'; Abbaszade 90+1'	Report	Agayev 90+3'	Stadium: Kapital Bank Arena; Attendance: 30; Referee: Namig Bakirov

29 October 2024 14	Ağdaş	0–6	Kapaz	Tovuz
16:00 AZT (UTC+4)		Report	N'Diaye 10'; L'Koucha 17', 42'; Rzayev 21', 61'; Mammadov 68'	Stadium: Tovuz City Stadium; Attendance: 50; Referee: Sabuhi Bayramov

29 October 2024 8	Shahdag Qusar	0–4	Araz-Naxçıvan	Baku
16:00 AZT (UTC+4)		Report	Ağalarov 16', 49'; Benny 45'; Mammadov 82'	Stadium: Liv Bona Dea Arena; Attendance: 40; Referee: Ali Aliyev

29 October 2024 12	Dinamo	0–6	Sabail	Bayil
18:00 AZT (UTC+4)		Report	Mammadov 22'; Masimov 25'; Asadov 39', 56'; Bouali 66'; Shahhuseyni 81'	Stadium: ASCO Arena; Attendance: 100; Referee: Ruslan Guliyev

30 October 2024 9	Mingəçevir	1–0	Zagatala	Mingachevir
14:00 AZT (UTC+4)	Farmanov 44'	Report		Stadium: Yashar Mammadzade Stadium; Attendance: Shamil Imanzade; Referee: 350

30 October 2024 10	Shamakhi	6–1	Shamkir	Shamakhi
14:00 AZT (UTC+4)	Zamanov 5', 33'; Safarov 11'; Benteke 22', 68'; Mammadli 62'	Report	Cafarov 16'	Stadium: Shamakhi City Stadium; Attendance: 350; Referee: Kamran Aliyev

30 October 2024 11	Qaradağ Lökbatan	3–0	Karvan	Lökbatan
14:00 AZT (UTC+4)	Mukhtarly 5', 13'; Aliyev 88'	Report		Stadium: Lökbatan OIK stadium Attendance: 60; Referee: Islam Mammadov

30 October 2024 16	Shafa Baku	2–3 (a.e.t.)	Difai Agsu	Baku
15:00 AZT (UTC+4)	Huseynzada 76' (red card) 120+4'; Narimanov 90+1'; Nesibov (red card) 105'	Report	Memmedli 20', 23'; Guluzada 114'; Ayralov (red card) 120+4'	Stadium: ASK Arena; Attendance: 350; Referee: Vugar Hasanli

31 October 2024 15	İmişli	5–1	Jabrayil	Shamakhi
14:00 AZT (UTC+4)	Huseynov 2'; Rollo 26'; Ingilabli 47', 51', 54'	Report	Garayev 10'	Stadium: Shamakhi OIK stadium Attendance: 50; Referee: Rövşən Rəcəbov

31 October 2024 13	Gabala	4–0	Baku Sporting	Qabala
15:00 AZT (UTC+4)	Massoumou 5' (pen.), 43'; Voronsov 20'; Isgandarov 75'	Report		Stadium: Gabala City Stadium; Attendance: 300; Referee: Nicat İsmayıllı

== Last 16 ==
On 2 December, the AFFA published the list of referee appointments for the Last 16.

3 December 2024 21	Qaradağ Lökbatan	0–2	Sabail	Baku
15:00 AZT (UTC+4)		Report	Rustamov 53'; Guliyev 62'	Stadium: Bayil Arena; Attendance: 50; Referee: Ali Aliyev

3 December 2024 19	Araz-Naxçıvan	3–1	Mingəçevir	Baku
16:00 AZT (UTC+4)	Isgandarov 5'; Benny 21'; Meza 66'	Report	Bayramov 80'	Stadium: Dalga Arena; Attendance: 30; Referee: Akbar Ahmadov

3 December 2024 25	Turan Tovuz	2–2 (a.e.t.) (1 – 3 p)	Sabah	Tovuz
18:00 AZT (UTC+4)	Souza 28'; John 113'	Report	Irazabal 45+2'; Kupusović 118'	Stadium: City Stadium; Attendance: 3,000; Referee: Inqilab Mammadov
	Penalties
	Aliyev (penalty scored); Guseynov (penalty missed); Rzayev (penalty missed); John (penalty missed)		Parris (penalty missed); Chakla (penalty scored); Aliyev (penalty scored); Mickels (penalty scored)

4 December 2024 22	Gabala	0–2	Qarabağ	Qabala
16:00 AZT (UTC+4)		Report	Zoubir 7'; Musayev 90+1' (o.g.)	Stadium: City Stadium; Attendance: 800; Referee: Rauf Jabarov

4 December 2024 23	Kapaz	1–0	İmişli	Tovuz
16:00 AZT (UTC+4)	L'Koucha 85' (pen.)	Report		Stadium: City Stadium; Attendance: 60; Referee: Nijat Ismayilli

4 December 2024 24	Neftçi	6–0	Difai Agsu	Baku
18:00 AZT (UTC+4)	Bogomolsky 21', 67'; Mammadov 25' (pen.); Matias 27'; Salyanski 57'; Shtohrin 63'	Report		Stadium: Neftçi Arena; Attendance: 300; Referee: Elvin Bayramov

4 December 2024 26	Sumgayit	3–1 (a.e.t.)	MOIK Baku	Sumgait
19:00 AZT (UTC+4)	Taşqın 31'; Muradly 97'; Sadykhov 119'	Report	Aliyev 64'	Stadium: City Stadium; Attendance: 400; Referee: Aliyar Agayev

4 December 2024 20	Zira	3–1	Shamakhi	Zirə
19:00 AZT (UTC+4)	Gomis 12'; Nuriyev 24'; Lawal 52'	Report	Konaté 41'	Stadium: Zira Olympic Sport Complex Stadium; Attendance: 400; Referee: Rauf Allahverdiyev

== Quarter-finals ==
5 February 2025 First leg	Kapaz	0–2	Neftçi	Tovuz
16:00 AZT (UTC+4)		Report	Salyanski 36'; Yuri Matias 69'	Stadium: City Stadium; Attendance: 500; Referee: İnqilab Məmmədov

28 February 2025 Second leg	Neftçi	1–0 (3–0 agg.)	Kapaz	Baku
19:30 AZT (UTC+4)	Sambou 27'	Report		Stadium: Neftçi Arena; Attendance: 650; Referee: Rəşad Əhmədov

5 February 2025 First leg	Sabah	0–0	Sumgayit	Masazır
18:30 AZT (UTC+4)		Report		Stadium: Bank Respublika Arena; Attendance: 950; Referee: Əliyar Ağayev

27 February 2025 Second leg	Sumgayit	0–4 (0–4 agg.)	Sabah	Sumgait
19:30 AZT (UTC+4)		Report	Nuriyev 54'; Aliyev 71'; Mickels 82'; Seydiyev 90+3'	Stadium: City Stadium; Attendance: 1,500; Referee: Elçin Məsiyev

6 February 2025 First leg	Araz-Naxçıvan	1–0	Zira	Baku
16:00 AZT (UTC+4)	Benny 61' (pen.)	Report		Stadium: Dalga Arena; Attendance: 100; Referee: Elçin Məsiyev

28 February 2025 Second leg	Zira	0–2 (0–3 agg.)	Araz-Naxçıvan	Zirə
16:00 AZT (UTC+4)		Report	Santos 3' (pen.), 45' (pen.)	Stadium: Zira Olympic Sport Complex Stadium; Attendance: 200; Referee: İnqilab Məmmədov

6 February 2025 First leg	Sabail	0–1	Qarabağ	Baku
18:30 AZT (UTC+4)		Report	Benzia 35'	Stadium: ASCO Arena; Attendance: 800; Referee: Rauf Cabarov

27 February 2025 Second leg	Qarabağ	3–1 (4–1 agg.)	Sabail	Baku
16:00 AZT (UTC+4)	Qurbanlı 13'; Rustamov 43' (o.g.); Akhundzade 55'	Report	Abdullazade 15'	Stadium: Tofiq Bahramov Republican Stadium; Attendance: Cavid Cəlilov; Referee: 546

== Semi-finals ==
2 April 2025 First leg	Araz-Naxçıvan	1–0	Qarabağ	Baku
17:00 AZT (UTC+4)	Santos 28' (pen.)	Report		Stadium: Dalga Arena; Attendance: 600; Referee: Elçin Məsiyev

23 April 2025 Second leg	Qarabağ	3–0 (3–1 agg.)	Araz-Naxçıvan	Baku
18:00 AZT (UTC+4)	Benzia 65'; Akhundzade 70'; Bayramov 77' (pen.)	Report		Stadium: Azersun Arena; Attendance: 1,300; Referee: Ravan Hamzazade

2 April 2025 First leg	Neftçi	1–2	Sabah	Baku
19:30 AZT (UTC+4)	Matias 21'	Report	Salahlı 11' (o.g.); Šafranko 52'	Stadium: Neftçi Arena; Attendance: 2,934; Referee: Əliyar Ağayev

23 April 2025 Second leg	Sabah	1–1 (3–2 agg.)	Neftçi	Masazır
21:00 AZT (UTC+4)	Sekidika 23'	Report	Mahmudov 40'	Stadium: Bank Respublika Arena; Attendance: 6,600; Referee: İnqilab Məmmədov

== Final ==
31 May 2025	Qarabağ	2–3 (a.e.t.)	Sabah	Sumgait
19:00 AZT (UTC+4)	Kady 45+1'; Irazabal 67' (o.g.)	Report	Šafranko 36' (pen.); Parris 90+7'; Mutallimov 119'	Stadium: Sumgayit City Stadium; Attendance: 7,513; Referee: İnqilab Məmmədov

== Scorers ==
As of match played 23 April 2025

3 goals:

- (Brazil) Felipe Santos - Araz-Naxçıvan
- (Portugal) Benny - Araz-Naxçıvan
- (Azerbaijan) Idris Ingilabli - İmişli
- (Spain) Karim L'Koucha - Kapaz
- (Brazil) Yuri Matias - Neftçi
- (Brazil) Alex Souza - Turan Tovuz

2 goals:

- (Azerbaijan) Elvin Ismailov - Ağdaş
- (Azerbaijan) Senan Ağalarov - Araz-Naxçıvan
- (Azerbaijan) Xeyyam Memmedli - Difai Agsu
- (Azerbaijan) Alisa Isayev - Dinamo
- (Republic of the Congo) Domi Massoumou - Gabala
- (Azerbaijan) Ulvi Jalilov - Göygöl
- (Azerbaijan) Ilgar Alakbarov - Hypers
- (Azerbaijan) Javid Imamverdiyev - Hypers
- (Azerbaijan) Tural Rzayev - Kapaz
- (Azerbaijan) Agadadash Salyanski - Neftçi
- (Belarus) Yegor Bogomolsky - Neftçi
- (Algeria) Yassine Benzia - Qarabağ
- (Azerbaijan) Nariman Akhundzade - Qarabağ
- (Azerbaijan) Ceyhun Mukhtarly - Qaradağ Lökbatan
- (Azerbaijan) Gülaga Asadov - Sabail
- (Azerbaijan) Famil Jamalov - Shahdag Qusar
- (Azerbaijan) Emin Zamanov - Shamakhi
- (Belgium) Jonathan Benteke - Shamakhi
- (Azerbaijan) Parviz Azadov - Shimal
- (Azerbaijan) Huseyn Huseynov - Turan Tovuz

1 goals:

- (Azerbaijan) Ulvi Sariyev - Ağdaş
- (Azerbaijan) Elchin Suleymanov - Ağdaş
- (Azerbaijan) Ulvi Isgandarov - Araz-Naxçıvan
- (Azerbaijan) Elcan Mammadov - Araz-Naxçıvan
- (Portugal) César Meza Colli - Araz-Naxçıvan
- (Azerbaijan) Emil Guluzada - Difai Agsu
- (Azerbaijan) Ramal Ahmadov - Dinamo
- (Azerbaijan) Valeh Seyidov - Dinamo
- (Azerbaijan) Farid Isgandarov - Gabala
- (Azerbaijan) Ruslan Voronsov - Gabala
- (Azerbaijan) Asgar Huseynov - İmişli
- (Brazil) Diogo Rollo - İmişli
- (Azerbaijan) Taleh Garayev - Jabrayil
- (Azerbaijan) Nicat Mammadov - Kapaz
- (Mali) Lassana N'Diaye - Kapaz
- (Azerbaijan) Nihad Mammadov - Kür-Araz
- (Azerbaijan) Elmin Bayramov - Mingəçevir
- (Azerbaijan) Taleh Farmanov - Mingəçevir
- (Azerbaijan) Cavidan Abbaszade - MOIK Baku
- (Azerbaijan) Ibrahim Aliyev - MOIK Baku
- (Azerbaijan) Balamirza Soltanov - MOIK Baku
- (Azerbaijan) Dzhavid Tagiyev - MOIK Baku
- (Azerbaijan) Emin Mahmudov - Neftçi
- (Azerbaijan) Murad Mammadov - Neftçi
- (Germany) Bassala Sambou - Neftçi
- (Ukraine) Andriy Shtohrin - Neftçi
- (Azerbaijan) Firuddin Aghalarov - Qusar
- (Azerbaijan) Toral Bayramov - Qarabağ
- (Azerbaijan) Musa Qurbanlı - Qarabağ
- (France) Abdellah Zoubir - Qarabağ
- (Azerbaijan) Huseyn Aliyev - Qaradağ Lökbatan
- (Azerbaijan) Khayal Aliyev - Sabah
- (Azerbaijan) Anatoliy Nuriyev - Sabah
- (Azerbaijan) Amin Seydiyev - Sabah
- (Germany) Joy-Lance Mickels - Sabah
- (Nigeria) Jesse Sekidika - Sabah
- (Serbia) Njegoš Kupusović - Sabah
- (Slovakia) Pavol Šafranko - Sabah
- (Spain) Jon Irazabal - Sabah
- (Azerbaijan) Rufat Abdullazade - Sabail
- (Azerbaijan) Nihad Guliyev - Sabail
- (Azerbaijan) Oruj Mammadov - Sabail
- (Azerbaijan) Vusal Masimov - Sabail
- (Azerbaijan) Emin Rustamov - Sabail
- (Azerbaijan) Farid Shahhuseyni - Sabail
- (Morocco) Ayman Bouali - Sabail
- (Azerbaijan) Elmeddin Huseynzada - Shafa Baku
- (Azerbaijan) Tural Narimanov - Shafa Baku
- (Azerbaijan) Elvin Nasibov - Shafa Baku
- (Azerbaijan) Elchin Rahimli - Shafa Baku
- (Azerbaijan) Emil Quliyev - Shahdag Qusar
- (Azerbaijan) Fakhri Mammadli - Shamakhi
- (Azerbaijan) Gurban Safarov - Shamakhi
- (France) Brahim Konaté - Shamakhi
- (Azerbaijan) Vidadi Cafarov - Shamkir
- (Azerbaijan) Akif Taghiyev - Shamkir
- (Azerbaijan) Mahammad Agayev - Shimal
- (Azerbaijan) Emin Askarov - Shimal
- (Azerbaijan) Tofig Nasibov - Shimal
- (Azerbaijan) Sanan Muradly - Sumgayit
- (Azerbaijan) Ragim Sadykhov - Sumgayit
- (Azerbaijan) Sertan Taşqın - Sumgayit
- (Azerbaijan) Şehriyar Aliyev - Turan Tovuz
- (Azerbaijan) Sadig Guliyev - Turan Tovuz
- (Nigeria) Otto John - Turan Tovuz
- (Azerbaijan) Ceyhun Nuriyev - Zira
- (France) Iron Gomis - Zira
- (Nigeria) Yusuf Lawal - Zira

Own goals:

- (Azerbaijan) Karim Valiyev - for Hypers vs Göygöl 13 October 2024
- (Azerbaijan) Ramin Ahmadov - for Turan Tovuz vs Hypers 28 October 2024
- (Azerbaijan) Murad Musayev - for Qarabağ vs Gabala 4 December 2024
- (Azerbaijan) Emin Rustamov- for Qarabağ vs Sabail 27 February 2025
- (Azerbaijan) Azər Salahlı- for Sabah vs Neftçi 2 April 2025

== See also ==
- 2024–25 Azerbaijan Premier League
- 2024–25 Azerbaijan First Division
- 2024–25 Azerbaijan Second League
