= Nicat Mehbalıyev =

Azerbaijani footballer (born 2000)

Personal information
- Full name: Nicat Lətif oğlu Mehbalıyev
- Date of birth: 11 September 2000 (age 26)
- Place of birth: Azerbaijan
- Height: 1.92 m (6 ft 4 in)
- Position: Goalkeeper

Team information
- Current team: Sabah
- Number: 55

Youth career
- Baku
- Qarabağ
- Sumgayit

Senior career*
Years	Team	Apps	(Gls)
2021–	Sabah	24	(0)
2021–2022	→ Gabala (loan)	26	(0)

International career
2018–2019	Azerbaijan U19	6	(0)
2021	Azerbaijan U21	6	(0)
- * Club domestic league appearances and goals as of 22 June 2026

Nicat Lətif oğlu Mehbalıyev (born 11 September 2000) is an Azerbaijani professional footballer who plays as a goalkeeper for Azerbaijan Premier League club Sabah.

== Career ==
On 17 April 2021, Mehbalıyev made his Azerbaijan Premier League debut for Sabah in a match against Shamakhi.

On 26 December 2023, Mehbalıyev extended his contract with Sabah until June 2026.
