= Famil Jamalov =

Azerbaijani footballer (born 1998)

Personal information
- Full name: Famil Shahin oglu Jamalov
- Date of birth: 8 April 1998 (age 28)
- Place of birth: Azerbaijan
- Height: 1.81 m (5 ft 11 1/2 in)
- Position: Forward

Team information
- Current team: Shahdag Qusar
- Number: 9

Youth career
- Baku
- Qarabağ

Senior career*
| Years | Team | Apps | (Gls) |
| 2019–2020 | Zagatala | | |
| 2021–2022 | Neftçi | 1 | (0) |
| 2022–2023 | Turan-Tovuz | 2 | (0) |
| 2023 | İrəvan | | |
| 2024– | Shahdag Qusar | | |

International career
| 2015 | Azerbaijan U17 | 3 | (0) |
| 2016 | Azerbaijan U19 | 3 | (0) |
- * Club domestic league appearances and goals as of 19:28, 27 July 2025 (UTC)

Famil Jamalov (Azerbaijani: Famil Camalov, born on 8 April 1998) is an Azerbaijani footballer who plays as a forward for Shahdag Qusar in the Azerbaijan Premier League.

== Club career ==
On 12 September 2021, Jamalov made his debut in the Azerbaijan Premier League for Neftçi match against Qarabağ.
