= 2021–22 Qarabağ FK season =

Qarabağ
2021–22 season
- President: Tahir Gözal
- Manager: Gurban Gurbanov
- Stadium: Azersun Arena
- Premier League: 1st
- Azerbaijan Cup: Winners
- Europa Conference League: Knockout round play-off vs Marseille
- Top goalscorer: League: Kady (12); All: Kady (20)
Home colours	Away colours	Third colours

The Qarabağ 2021–22 season was Qarabağ's 29th Azerbaijan Premier League season and their fourteenth season under manager Gurban Gurbanov. As well as the Azerbaijan Premier League, Qarabağ will also participate in the Azerbaijan Cup and the inaugural season of the UEFA Europa Conference League.

== Season overview ==
On 1 June, Hajiagha Hajili had his loan deal with Zira extended for an additional year.

On 8 June, Mahir Emreli left the club to sign for Legia Warsaw.

On 11 June, Qarabağ announced the signing of Kady on a two-year contract, with the option of an additional year, from Vilafranquense.

On 1 July, Qarabağ announced the signing of Ramil Sheydayev to a two-year contract, from Sabah.

On 16 July, Qarabağ announced the signing of Marko Vešović to a two-year contract, from Legia Warsaw.

On 26 July, Uroš Matić left Qarabağ.

On 29 July, Qarabağ announced the signing of Bahlul Mustafazade to a three-year contract.

On 3 August, Qarabağ announced the return of Richard Almeida on a one-year contract, and Gaspar Panadero from Cádiz on a three-year contract.

On 18 August, Qarabağ announced the signing of Ibrahima Wadji to a three-year contract from Haugesund.

On 15 December, Qarabağ announced the signing of Rustam Akhmedzade on a contract until 30 June 2026, from Mynai.

On 12 January, Qarabağ announced the signing of Luka Gugeshashvili on loan from Jagiellonia Białystok until the end of the season. The following day, 13 January, Qarabağ announced the signing of Leandro Andrade from Cherno More, on a contract until 30 June 2025.

On 31 January, Gaspar Panadero was loaned to AEK Larnaca for the remainder of the season.

On 9 February, Rahil Mammadov was loaned to Zira for the remainder of the season.

== Squad ==
As of match played 27 May 2022

No.	Name	Nationality	Position	Date of birth (age)	Signed from	Signed in	Contract ends	Apps.	Goals
Goalkeepers
1	Shahrudin Mahammadaliyev	(Azerbaijan)	GK	12 June 1994 (aged 27)	Sumgayit	2015		103	0
23	Luka Gugeshashvili	(Georgia (country))	GK	29 April 1999 (aged 23)	loan from Jagiellonia Białystok	2022	2022	8	0
89	Amin Ramazanov	(Azerbaijan)	GK	20 January 2003 (aged 19)	Lokomotiv Moscow	2021		2	0
Defenders
5	Maksim Medvedev	(Azerbaijan)	DF	29 September 1989 (aged 32)	Youth team	2006		501+	17+
13	Bahlul Mustafazade	(Azerbaijan)	DF	27 February 1997 (aged 25)	Unattached	2021	2024	21	0
21	Rauf Huseynli	(Azerbaijan)	DF	25 January 2000 (aged 22)	Youth team	2019		1	1
24	Zamiq Aliyev	(Azerbaijan)	DF	5 May 2001 (aged 21)	Youth team	2020		1	0
29	Marko Vešović	(Montenegro)	DF	2 May 1996 (aged 26)	Legia Warsaw	2021		39	3
30	Abbas Huseynov	(Azerbaijan)	DF	13 June 1995 (aged 26)	Inter Baku	2017		112	2
55	Badavi Huseynov	(Azerbaijan)	DF	11 July 1991 (aged 30)	Anzhi Makhachkala	2012		283	5
81	Kevin Medina	(Colombia)	DF	9 March 1993 (aged 29)	Chaves	2020	2023	74	1
83	Nihad Guliyev	(Azerbaijan)	DF	19 July 2001 (aged 20)	Youth team	2020		1	0
Midfielders
2	Gara Garayev	(Azerbaijan)	MF	12 October 1992 (aged 29)	Youth team	2008		424	4
6	Patrick Andrade	(Cape Verde)	MF	9 February 1993 (aged 29)	Cherno More Varna	2020	2022 (+1)	70	11
7	Richard Almeida	(Azerbaijan)	MF	20 March 1989 (aged 33)	Zira	2021	2022	305	55
10	Abdellah Zoubir	(France)	MF	5 December 1991 (aged 30)	RC Lens	2018		158	36
15	Leandro Andrade	(Cape Verde)	MF	24 September 1999 (aged 22)	Cherno More	2021	2025	15	4
18	Ismayil Ibrahimli	(Azerbaijan)	MF	13 February 1998 (aged 24)	MOIK Baku	2018		86	7
19	Filip Ozobić	(Azerbaijan)	MF	8 April 1991 (aged 31)	Gabala	2018		120	35
20	Kady	(Brazil)	MF	2 May 1996 (aged 26)	Vilafranquense	2021		44	20
27	Toral Bayramov	(Azerbaijan)	MF	23 February 2001 (aged 21)	Academy	2019		68	3
44	Elvin Cafarguliyev	(Azerbaijan)	MF	26 October 2000 (aged 21)	Youth team	2019		46	1
Forwards
11	Jaime Romero	(Spain)	FW	31 July 1990 (aged 31)	Córdoba	2019	2022	67	13
22	Musa Gurbanli	(Azerbaijan)	FW	13 April 2002 (aged 20)	Youth team	2019		29	10
25	Ibrahima Wadji	(Senegal)	FW	5 May 1995 (aged 27)	Haugesund	2021	2024	28	16
77	Ramil Sheydayev	(Azerbaijan)	FW	15 March 1996 (aged 26)	Sabah	2021	2023	59	14
97	Rustam Akhmedzade	(Azerbaijan)	FW	25 December 2000 (aged 21)	Mynai	2021	2026	8	0
Away on loan
4	Rahil Mammadov	(Azerbaijan)	DF	24 November 1995 (aged 26)	Sabail	2018	2021	55	2
17	Gaspar Panadero	(Spain)	MF	9 December 1997 (aged 24)	Cádiz	2021	2024	4	0
	Hajiagha Hajili	(Azerbaijan)	MF	30 January 1998 (aged 24)	Gabala	2019	2023	11	0
	Ruslan Hajiyev	(Azerbaijan)	MF	20 March 1998 (aged 24)	Youth team	2018		0	0
	Owusu Kwabena	(Ghana)	FW	18 June 1997 (aged 24)	Leganés	2020	2023	44	9
Left during the season
8	Uroš Matić	(Serbia)	MF	23 May 1990 (aged 32)	Copenhagen	2020	2023	31	3
12	Emil Balayev	(Azerbaijan)	GK	17 April 1994 (aged 28)	Zira	2020		19	0

=== Out on loan ===
Note: Flags indicate national team as defined under FIFA eligibility rules; some limited exceptions apply. Players may hold more than one non-FIFA nationality.

No.	Pos.	Nation	Player
17	MF	ESP	Gaspar Panadero (at AEK Larnaca)
—	MF	AZE	Hajiagha Hajili (at Zira)

No.	Pos.	Nation	Player
—	MF	AZE	Ruslan Hajiyev (at Sabail)
—	FW	GHA	Owusu Kwabena (at MKE Ankaragücü)

== Transfers ==
=== In ===
Date	Position	Nationality	Name	From	Fee	Ref.
11 June 2021	MF	(Brazil)	Kady	Vilafranquense	Undisclosed	
1 July 2021	GK	(Azerbaijan)	Amin Ramazanov	Lokomotiv Moscow	Undisclosed	
1 July 2021	FW	(Azerbaijan)	Ramil Sheydayev	Sabah	Undisclosed	
16 July 2021	DF	(Montenegro)	Marko Vešović	Legia Warsaw	Undisclosed	
29 July 2021	DF	(Azerbaijan)	Bahlul Mustafazade	Unattached	Free	
3 August 2021	MF	(Azerbaijan)	Richard Almeida	Zira	Undisclosed	
3 August 2021	MF	(Spain)	Gaspar Panadero	Cádiz	Undisclosed	
18 August 2021	FW	(Senegal)	Ibrahima Wadji	Haugesund	Undisclosed	
15 December 2021	FW	(Azerbaijan)	Rustam Akhmedzade	Mynai	Undisclosed	
13 January 2022	MF	(Cape Verde)	Leandro Andrade	Cherno More	Undisclosed	

=== Loans in ===
Date from	Position	Nationality	Name	From	Date to	Ref.
12 January 2022	GK	(Georgia (country))	Luka Gugeshashvili	Jagiellonia Białystok	End of season	

=== Out ===
Date	Position	Nationality	Name	To	Fee	Ref.
8 June 2021	FW	(Azerbaijan)	Mahir Emreli	Legia Warsaw	Undisclosed	

=== Loans out ===
Date from	Position	Nationality	Name	To	Date to	Ref.
1 June 2021	MF	(Azerbaijan)	Hajiagha Hajili	Zira	End of season	
1 June 2021	FW	(Ghana)	Owusu Kwabena	MKE Ankaragücü	End of season	
9 July 2021	DF	(Azerbaijan)	Rauf Huseynli	Zira	31 December 2021	
11 August 2021	MF	(Azerbaijan)	Ruslan Hajiyev	Sabail	End of season	
31 January 2022	MF	(Spain)	Gaspar Panadero	AEK Larnaca	End of season	
9 February 2022	DF	(Azerbaijan)	Rahil Mammadov	Zira	End of season	

=== Released ===
Date	Position	Nationality	Name	Joined	Date	Ref
26 July 2021	MF	(Serbia)	Uroš Matić	Abha	26 July 2021	
3 March 2022	GK	(Azerbaijan)	Emil Balayev	Turan	4 March 2022	
31 May 2022	MF	(Cape Verde)	Patrick Andrade	Partizan		

== Friendlies ==
26 June 2021	Qarabağ (Azerbaijan)	7 – 0	(Azerbaijan) Keşla	Baku
18:00 AZT (UTC+4)		Report		Stadium: Azersun Arena

30 June 2021	Qarabağ (Azerbaijan)	3 – 1	(Azerbaijan) Sumgayit	Baku
18:30 AZT (UTC+4)		Report		Stadium: Azersun Arena

7 July 2021	Qarabağ (Azerbaijan)	1 – 0	(Bulgaria) CSKA Sofia	Fulmpes, Austria
20:00 AZT (UTC+4)		Report

11 July 2021	Qarabağ (Azerbaijan)	0 – 1	(Russia) Arsenal Tula	Fulmpes, Austria
20:00 AZT (UTC+4)		Report

15 July 2021	Qarabağ (Azerbaijan)	2 – 2	(Germany) Augsburg	Kufstein, Austria
18:00 AZT (UTC+4)	Andrade 26'; Romero 28'	Report	Gouweleeuw 37' (pen.); Niederlechner 45'	Stadium: Kufstein Arena

14 January 2022	Qarabağ (Azerbaijan)	0 – 0	(Romania) Gaz Metan Mediaș	Antalya, Turkey
AZT (UTC+4)		Report

21 January 2022	Qarabağ (Azerbaijan)	0 – 1	(Serbia) TSC Bačka Topola	Antalya, Turkey
13:30 AZT (UTC+4)		Report	P.Ratkov 62'

22 January 2022	Qarabağ (Azerbaijan)	3 – 2	(Poland) Śląsk Wrocław	Antalya, Turkey
AZT (UTC+4)	Goal	Report	Goal

25 January 2022	Qarabağ (Azerbaijan)	0 – 0	(Poland) Wisła Kraków	Antalya, Turkey
AZT (UTC+4)		Report

== Competitions ==
=== Overview ===
Competition	First match	Last match	Starting round	Final position	Record							
Competition	First match	Last match	Starting round	Final position	Pld	W	D	L	GF	GA	GD	Win %
Premier League	15 August 2021	21 May 2022	Matchday 1	Winners	28	21	6	1	72	13	+59	75.00
Azerbaijan Cup	1 February 2022	27 May 2022	Quarterfinal	Winners	5	4	1	0	16	2	+14	80.00
UEFA Europa Conference League	22 July 2021	24 February 2022	Second qualifying round	Knockout round play-offs	14	7	4	3	18	16	+2	50.00
Total					47	32	11	4	106	31	+75	68.09

Last updated: 27 May 2022
Source: Competitions

=== Premier League ===
==== Results summary ====
Overall								Home						Away					
Pld	W	D	L	GF	GA	GD	Pts	W	D	L	GF	GA	GD	W	D	L	GF	GA	GD
28	21	6	1	72	13	+59	69	12	2	0	47	5	+42	9	4	1	25	8	+17

Last updated: 21 May 2022.
Source: See Results

==== Results by round ====
Round	1	2	3	4	5	6	7	8	9	10	11	12	13	14	15	16	17	18	19	20	21	22	23	24	25	26	27	28
Ground	A	H	A	H	A	H	A	A	H	A	H	A	H	H	A	A	H	A	A	H	A	H	A	H	H	H	A	H
Result	D	W	W	W	D	W	W	L	W	W	W	D	W	W	W	D	W	W	W	W	W	W	W	D	D	W	W	W
Position	5	4	2	2	2	1	1	1	1	1	1	1	1	1	1	1	1	1	1	1	1	1	1	1	1	1	1	1

Updated to match(es) played on 21 May 2022. Source: See Results
A = Away; H = Home; W = Win; D = Draw; L = Loss

==== Results ====
15 August 2021 1	Zira	1 – 1	Qarabağ	Zirə
18:00 AZT (UTC+4)	Stoilov (yellow card) 19'; Hajili (yellow card) 44'; Khalilzade 50' (pen.); Ramazanov (yellow card) 81'	Report	Ibrahimli 18' (yellow card) 28'; Mustafazade (yellow card) 49'; Ozobić (yellow card) 88'; Richard (yellow card) 90+4'	Stadium: Zira Olympic Sport Complex Stadium; Referee: Rauf Jabbarov

22 August 2021 2	Qarabağ	3 – 0	Sabail	Baku
20:30 AZT (UTC+4)	Gurbanli 30', 45+2'; Ozobić (yellow card) 69' (goal) 76'	Report	Goxha (yellow card) 90+3'; Hajiyev (yellow card) 90+5'	Stadium: Azersun Arena; Referee: Elcin Masiyev

12 September 2021 3	Neftçi	1 – 2	Qarabağ	Baku
20:30 AZT (UTC+4)	Çelik (yellow card) 36'; Mahmudov 47'; Zulfugarli (yellow card) 65'; Ramon (yellow card) 71'; Najafov (yellow card) 87'	Report	Wadji 21', 45'; Medina (yellow card) 56'; Garayev (yellow card) 78'	Stadium: Eighth Kilometer District Stadium; Referee: Rasad Ahmadov

20 September 2021 4	Qarabağ	2 – 0	Sumgayit	Baku
19:00 AZT (UTC+4)	Ozobić 42' (pen.), 90+5' (yellow card) 83'; Medvedev (yellow card) 45'; Richard (yellow card) 51'	Report	Badalov (yellow card) 41'; Naghiyev (yellow card) 53'; S.Bagherpasand (yellow card) 87'	Stadium: Azersun Arena; Referee: Kamal Umudlu

25 September 2021 5	Keşla	1 – 1	Qarabağ	Baku
17:00 AZT (UTC+4)	Tounkara (yellow card) 11'; E.Mustafayev (yellow card) 44'; Neto 72'; Felipe Santos (yellow card) 90+3'	Report	Andrade (yellow card) 12'; Zoubir 20'	Stadium: ASK Arena; Referee: Farid Haciyev

3 October 2021 6	Qarabağ	2 – 0	Gabala	Baku
19:00 AZT (UTC+4)	Zoubir 52'; Sheydayev 66'	Report	Isayev (yellow card) 28'; Isgandarov (yellow card) 90+2'	Stadium: Azersun Arena; Referee: Aliyar Ağayev

17 October 2021 7	Sabah	1 – 2	Qarabağ	Masazır
18:45 AZT (UTC+4)	A.Xaybulayev (yellow card) 15'; Rodríguez (red card) 27'; Isayev 65'; Rzayev (yellow card) 90+1'	Report	A.Huseynov (yellow card) 12'; Medina (yellow card) 25'; Mahammadaliyev (yellow card) 27'; Ozobić 43'; Zoubir 51'; Vešović (yellow card) 66'	Stadium: Bank Respublika Arena; Referee: Kamal Umudlu

25 October 2021 8	Sabail	3 – 1	Qarabağ	Baku
19:00 AZT (UTC+4)	Šimkus (yellow card) 26'; Rajsel 33'; Goxha (yellow card) 26'; Abbasov 42'; Rahimli (yellow card) 66'; Naghiyev (yellow card) 69'; Manafov 90+1'; Farajov (yellow card) 90+1'	Report	Kady 65'; Mustafazade (yellow card) 89'	Stadium: Bayil Arena; Referee: Rauf Allahverdiyev

30 October 2021 9	Qarabağ	4 – 0	Neftçi	Baku
18:30 AZT (UTC+4)	Ozobić 10', 23' (pen.); Zoubir 14'; Garayev (yellow card) 70'; Vešović 90+3'	Report	Bougrine (yellow card) 29'; Buludov (yellow card) 37'; Çelik (yellow card) 55'; Mbodj (yellow card) 57'; Bezerra (yellow card) 80'	Stadium: Azersun Arena; Referee: Aliyar Agayev

7 November 2021 10	Sumgayit	0 – 4	Qarabağ	Sumgait
19:30 AZT (UTC+4)	E.Aliyev (yellow card) 50'	Report	Kady (yellow card) 28'; Sheydayev (yellow card) 39'; Gurbanli 45+2', 77'; Medvedev 51' (pen.); Ozobić (yellow card) 57'	Stadium: Kapital Bank Arena; Referee: Elcin Məsiyev

19 November 2021 11	Qarabağ	1 – 0	Keşla	Baku
19:00 AZT (UTC+4)	Patrick (yellow card) 42'; Sheydayev 49'	Report		Stadium: Azersun Arena; Referee: Kamal Umudlu

29 November 2021 12	Gabala	0 – 0	Qarabağ	Qabala
16:00 AZT (UTC+4)	Mammadov (yellow card) 45'; Muradov (yellow card) 57'; López (yellow card) 87'; Vukčević (yellow card) 87'; N.Mehbaliyev (yellow card) 90'	Report	Andrade (yellow card) 79'	Stadium: Gabala City Stadium; Referee: Kamranbay Rahimov

4 December 2021 13	Qarabağ	5 – 1	Sabah	Baku
18:15 AZT (UTC+4)	Zoubir 16', 51'; Ozobić 35'; Wadji 77', 90'	Report	Hasanalizade 27'; Camalov (yellow card) 37'	Stadium: Azersun Arena; Referee: Aliyar Ağayev

16 December 2021 14	Qarabağ	2 – 0	Zira	Baku
19:00 AZT (UTC+4)	Gurbanlı 6', 54'; Bayramov (yellow card) 9'; Sheydayev (yellow card) 26'; Mammadov (yellow card) 74'; Andrade (yellow card) 80'	Report		Stadium: Azersun Arena; Referee: Ravan Hamzazada

6 February 2022 15	Neftçi	1 – 2	Qarabağ	Baku
19:00 AZT (UTC+4)	Pato (yellow card) 5'; Çelik (yellow card) 50' (goal) 81'; Mahmudov (yellow card) 90+6'	Report	Kady 25', 62' (yellow card) 64'; Richard (yellow card) 45'; Medina (yellow card) 55'	Stadium: Eighth Kilometer District Stadium; Referee: Kamal Umudlu

28 February 2022 17	Keşla	0 – 0	Qarabağ	Baku
19:15 AZT (UTC+4)	Valizade (yellow card) 56'; Haziyev (yellow card) 90'	Report	Mustafazade (yellow card) 69'	Stadium: ASK Arena; Referee: Aliyar Agayev

5 March 2022 18	Qarabağ	5 – 1	Gabala	Baku
19:15 AZT (UTC+4)	Kady 16' (yellow card) 22'; Medina (yellow card) 39' (goal) 65'; Wadji 51'; Garayev (yellow card) 54'; Ozobić 68'; Zoubir 89'	Report	Alimi 40' (pen.); Vukčević (yellow card) 45+1'; Utzig (yellow card) 74'	Stadium: Azersun Arena; Referee: Elcin Məsiyev

12 March 2022 19	Sabah	0 – 1	Qarabağ	Masazır
19:00 AZT (UTC+4)	Fofana (yellow card) 6'; Christian (yellow card) 86'; Ceballos (yellow card) 90+4'	Report	Zoubir 30'; Mustafazade (yellow card) 73'; Vešović (yellow card) 89'	Stadium: Bank Respublika Arena; Referee: Farid Haciyev

19 March 2022 20	Zira	0 – 3	Qarabağ	Zirə
19:00 AZT (UTC+4)	Aliyev (yellow card) 55'; Diniyev (yellow card) 75'	Report	Sheydayev 10' (yellow card) 55'; P.Andrade (yellow card) 35'; Kady 48', 65'; Cafarguliyev (yellow card) 53'; Richard (yellow card) 90+1'	Stadium: Zira Olympic Sport Complex Stadium; Referee: Rauf Jabarov

2 April 2022 21	Qarabağ	5 – 1	Sabail	Baku
16:00 AZT (UTC+4)	L.Andrade 3', 41'; Sheydayev 54', 56'; Medvedev (yellow card) 58'; Mahammadaliyev (yellow card) 61'; Cafarguliyev 86'	Report	Rajsel 62' (pen.); H.Guliyev (yellow card) 82'	Stadium: Azersun Arena; Referee: Raad Ahmadov

10 April 2022 22	Sumgayit	0 – 3	Qarabağ	Sumgait
18:30 AZT (UTC+4)	Ghorbani (yellow card) 3'; Naghiyev (yellow card) 65'	Report	Kady 16'; Vešović 67'; L.Andrade 69'	Stadium: Kapital Bank Arena; Referee: Aliyar Ağayev

15 April 2022 23	Qarabağ	8 – 0	Shamakhi	Baku
19:30 AZT (UTC+4)	Wadji 8', 16', 30'; Bayramov (yellow card) 18'; Ozobić 20', 21'; Vešović (yellow card) 39'; Kady 45+2'; Gurbanlı 49'; Ibrahimli (yellow card) 72'	Report	Valizade (yellow card) 56'	Stadium: Azersun Arena; Referee: Rauf Allahverdiyev
Note: On 6 April, Keşla changed their name to Shamakhi.

24 April 2022 24	Gabala	0 – 2	Qarabağ	Qabala
17:30 AZT (UTC+4)	Alimi (yellow card) 7'; Muradov (yellow card) 12'; Shahverdiyev (yellow card) 90+3'	Report	Wadji 6', 14'	Stadium: Gabala City Stadium; Referee: Ingilab Mammadov

3 May 2022 25	Qarabağ	1 – 1	Sabah	Baku
19:00 AZT (UTC+4)	P.Andrade (yellow card) 22' (yellow-red card) 59'; Kady 48'; Cafarguliyev (yellow card) 73'; Garayev (yellow card) 90+1'	Report	Rangel (yellow card) 2'; Camalov (yellow card) 22'; Christian 60'; Ochihava (yellow card) 71'	Stadium: Azersun Arena; Referee: Rauf Jabbarov

7 May 2022 26	Qarabağ	0 – 0	Zira	Baku
20:15 AZT (UTC+4)		Report		Stadium: Azersun Arena; Referee: Kamal Umudlu

12 May 2022 16	Qarabağ	5 – 0	Sumgayit	Baku
19:00 AZT (UTC+4)	Ozobić 4'; P.Andrade 11'; Kady 30', 52'; Wadji 31'; Medina (yellow card) 75'	Report	Khodzhaniyazov (yellow card) 90+3'	Stadium: Azersun Arena; Referee: Rauf Allahverdiyev
Note: Originally scheduled for 19 February.

15 May 2022 27	Sabail	0 – 3	Qarabağ	Baku
17:00 AZT (UTC+4)	Rajsel (yellow card) 20'; Šimkus (yellow card) 23'; Naghiyev (yellow card) 38'	Report	Huseynli (yellow card) 58' (goal) 70'; Z.Aliyev (yellow card) 76'; Gurbanlı 87'; Sheydayev 90+1'	Stadium: Bayil Arena; Referee: Vugar Həsənli

21 May 2022 28	Qarabağ	4 – 1	Neftçi	Baku
19:30 AZT (UTC+4)	P.Andrade 6'; Kady 10'; Yusifli 14' (o.g.); Vešović (yellow card) 36'; Brkić 57' (o.g.); Garayev (yellow card) 85'	Report	Stanković (yellow card) 18'; Israfilov (yellow card) 36'; V.Asgarov (yellow card) 39'; Zulfugarli (yellow card) 60'; Ramon 71'; Mbodj (yellow card) 85'	Stadium: Azersun Arena; Referee: Farid Haciyev

==== League table ====
Pos	Team	Pld	W	D	L	GF	GA	GD	Pts	Qualification
1	Qarabağ (C)	28	21	6	1	72	13	+59	69	Qualification for the Champions League first qualifying round
2	Neftçi Baku	28	15	5	8	42	31	+11	50	Qualification to Europa Conference League second qualifying round
3	Zira	28	13	8	7	33	27	+6	47	Qualification to Europa Conference League second qualifying round
4	Gabala	28	12	9	7	38	34	+4	45	Qualification to Europa Conference League second qualifying round
5	Sabah	28	12	5	11	42	34	+8	41	

Source: Soccerway
Rules for classification: 1) Points; 2) Head-to-head points; 3) Head-to-head goal difference; 4) Head-to-head goals scored; 5) Head-to-head away goals scored (only if two teams); 6) Goal difference; 7) Goals scored.
(C) Champions

=== Azerbaijan Cup ===
1 February 2022 Quarterfinal 1st leg	Qarabağ	1 – 0	Keşla	Baku
17:30 AZT (UTC+4)	Ozobić (yellow card) 45+2'; Wadji 56' L.Andrade (yellow card) 79'; Bayramov (yellow card) 90+4'	Report	Muradbayli (yellow card) 14'; Flores (yellow card) 65'; Guliyev (yellow card) 90+5'	Stadium: Azersun Arena; Referee: Vuqar Hasanli

11 February 2022 Quarterfinal 2nd leg	Keşla	0 – 6 (0 – 7 agg.)	Qarabağ	Baku
18:00 AZT (UTC+4)	Gigauri (yellow card) 44'; Valizade (yellow card) 83'	Report	P.Andrade 9'; Wadji 17', 45'; Sheydayev 43' (pen.), 84'; Gurbanlı 78'	Stadium: ASK Arena; Referee: Elcin Masiyev

20 April 2022 Semifinal 1st leg	Gabala	1 – 3	Qarabağ	Qabala
17:30 AZT (UTC+4)	Mammadov 6'; Vukčević (yellow card) 9'; Musayev (yellow card) 89'	Report	Ibrahimli 16'; Cafarguliyev (yellow card) 19'; Medina (yellow card) 53'; Sheydayev (yellow card) 58'; Medvedev (yellow card) 70'; Vešović (yellow card) 82'; Wadji 88'; Kady 90+1' (pen.)	Stadium: Gabala City Stadium; Referee: Kamal Umudlu

29 April 2022 Semifinal 2nd leg	Qarabağ	5 – 0 (8 – 1 agg.)	Gabala	Baku
17:30 AZT (UTC+4)	Sheydayev 5', 58'; Kady 13' (pen.), 17'; L.Andrade 37'	Report	Musayev (yellow card) 24'; Alimi (yellow card) 54'	Stadium: Azersun Arena; Referee: Elçin Məsiyev

==== Final ====
27 May 2022	Qarabağ	1 – 1 (a.e.t.) (4 – 3 p)	Zira	Qabala
19:00 AZT (UTC+4)	Zoubir 69'; Garayev (yellow card) 87'	Report	Keyta 17' (yellow card) 120+1'; Chantakias (yellow card) 59'; Nazirov (yellow card) 85'; Hajili (yellow card) 103'; Ramazanov (yellow card) 114'	Stadium: Gabala City Stadium; Referee: Aliyar Aghayev
	Penalties
	Garayev (penalty scored); Medvedev (penalty scored); Kady (penalty missed); Bayramov (penalty scored); Sheydayev (penalty scored)		Keyta (penalty scored); Volkovi (penalty missed); Isaiah (penalty scored); Hüseynov (penalty scored); Taşqın (penalty missed)

=== UEFA Europa Conference League ===
==== Qualifying rounds ====
22 July 2021 Second qualifying round 1st leg	Qarabağ (Azerbaijan)	0 – 0	(Israel) Ashdod	Baku, Azerbaijan
20:00 AZT (UTC+4)	Medvedev (red card) 83'; Ibrahimli (yellow card) 90'	Report	Ben Zaken (yellow card) 33'; Cvetković (yellow card) 44'	Stadium: Tofig Bahramov Stadium; Attendance: 8,231; Referee: Serhiy Boyko (Ukraine)

29 July 2021 Second qualifying round 2nd leg	Ashdod (Israel)	0 – 1 (0 – 1 agg.)	(Azerbaijan) Qarabağ	Ashdod, Israel
22:00 AZT (UTC+4)	Inbrum (yellow card) 59'	Report	Ozobić 6'; Medina (yellow card) 19'; A.Huseynov (yellow card) 67'; Mahammadaliyev (yellow card) 90+5'	Stadium: Yud-Alef Stadium; Attendance: 2,410; Referee: Novak Simović (Serbia)

5 August 2021 Third qualifying round 1st leg	AEL Limassol (Cyprus)	1 – 1	(Azerbaijan) Qarabağ	Larnaca, Cyprus
21:00 AZT (UTC+4)	Šćepović 69' (pen.)	Report	Medvedev (yellow card) 37'; Mahammadaliyev (yellow card) 68'; Zoubir 90+3'; Andrade (yellow card) 90+4'	Stadium: AEK Arena; Attendance: 1,833; Referee: Glenn Nyberg (Sweden)
Note: Match played at the AEK Arena in Larnaca, instead of AEL Limassol's regular stadium Tsirio Stadium in Limassol due to it not meeting UEFA requirements.

12 August 2021 Third qualifying round 2nd leg	Qarabağ (Azerbaijan)	1 – 0 (2 – 1 agg.)	(Cyprus) AEL Limassol	Baku, Azerbaijan
20:00 AZT (UTC+4)	Andrade (yellow card) 49'; Ozobić (yellow card) 54'; Bayramov (yellow card) 71'; Garayev (yellow card) 73'; Kady 87'	Report	Bruno Santos (yellow card) 11'; Riera (yellow card) 36'; Euller (yellow card) 81'	Stadium: Tofig Bahramov Stadium; Attendance: 12,251; Referee: Kristo Tohver (Estonia)

19 August 2021 Play-off round 1st leg	Qarabağ (Azerbaijan)	1 – 0	(Scotland) Aberdeen	Baku, Azerbaijan
20:00 AZT (UTC+4)	Romero 30'; Andrade (yellow card) 63'; Medvedev (yellow card) 90+5'; Ozobić (yellow card) 90+6'	Report	McCrorie (yellow card) 42'; Brown (yellow card) 55'; Gallagher (yellow card) 90+6'	Stadium: Tofig Bahramov Stadium; Attendance: 9,756; Referee: Rade Obrenovič (Slovenia)

26 August 2021 Play-off round 2nd leg	Aberdeen (Scotland)	1 – 3 (1 – 4 agg.)	(Azerbaijan) Qarabağ	Aberdeen, Scotland
22:45 AZT (UTC+4)	MacKenzie (yellow card) 32'; Ojo (yellow card) 58'; Brown (yellow card) 64'; Ferguson (yellow card) 60' (goal) 90+2' (pen.)	Report	Bayramov 8'; Kady 18' (yellow card) 25'; Ibrahimli (yellow card) 47'; Zoubir 72'	Stadium: Pittodrie Stadium; Referee: Harald Lechner (Austria)

==== Group stage ====
Pos	Team	Pld	W	D	L	GF	GA	GD	Pts	Qualification
1	(Switzerland) Basel	6	4	2	0	14	6	+8	14	Advance to round of 16
2	(Azerbaijan) Qarabağ	6	3	2	1	10	8	+2	11	Advance to knockout round play-offs
3	(Cyprus) Omonia	6	0	4	2	5	10	−5	4	
4	(Kazakhstan) Kairat	6	0	2	4	6	11	−5	2	

Source: UEFA
Rules for classification: Group stage tiebreakers

16 September 2021 1	Qarabağ (Azerbaijan)	0 – 0	(Switzerland) Basel	Baku, Azerbaijan
20:45 AZT (UTC+4)	Kady (yellow card) 61'	Report	Burger (yellow card) 23'; Kasami (yellow card) 51'; Millar (yellow card) 90+2'	Stadium: Tofig Bahramov Stadium; Attendance: 17,586; Referee: Erik Lambrechts (Belgium)
Note: Match played at the Tofig Bahramov Stadium, Baku, instead of Qarabağ's regular stadium Azersun Arena, Baku, which did not meet UEFA requirements.

30 September 2021 2	Omonia (Cyprus)	1 – 4	(Azerbaijan) Qarabağ	Nicosia, Cyprus
23:00 AZT (UTC+4)	Lecjaks 40'; Zachariou (yellow card) 62'	Report	Kady 52', 90+4'; Andrade (yellow card) 37'; Sheydaev 73'; Medvedev 79' (pen.)	Stadium: GSP Stadium; Referee: Bobby Madden (Scotland)

21 October 2021 3	Qarabağ (Azerbaijan)	2 – 1	(Kazakhstan) Kairat	Baku, Azerbaijan
20:45 AZT (UTC+4)	Mahammadaliyev (yellow card) 18'; Wadji (yellow card) 27'; Sheydayev 79'; A.Huseynov 90+1'	Report	Kanté 19' (pen.); Alves (yellow card) 64'; Shushenachev (yellow card) 90+5'	Stadium: Tofig Bahramov Stadium; Attendance: 17,252; Referee: Yevhen Aranovskyi (Ukraine)

4 November 2021 4	Kairat (Kazakhstan)	1 – 2	(Azerbaijan) Qarabağ	Almaty, Kazakhstan
19:30 AZT (UTC+4)	Kanté (yellow card) 37' (goal) 68'; Góralski (yellow card) 45+1'; Kosović (yellow card) 60'	Report	Medina (yellow card) 5'; Wadji 58'; Zoubir 72'	Stadium: Central Stadium; Attendance: 2,638; Referee: Dumitri Muntean (Moldova)

25 November 2021 5	Qarabağ (Azerbaijan)	2 – 2	(Cyprus) Omonia	Baku, Azerbaijan
21:45 AZT (UTC+4)	Kady (yellow card) 32'; Psaltis 49' (o.g.); Andrade 88'; Gurbanlı (yellow card) 88'; Bayramov (yellow card) 90+4'	Report	Kiko (yellow card) 32' (yellow-red card) 66'; Ďuriš (yellow card) 32' (goal) 43' (pen.); Diskerud (yellow card) 75'; Gómez 90'; Psaltis (yellow card) 90+6'	Stadium: Tofig Bahramov Stadium; Attendance: 17,231; Referee: Morten Krogh (Denmark)

10 December 2021 6	Basel (Switzerland)	3 – 0	(Azerbaijan) Qarabağ	Basel, Switzerland
00:00 AZT (UTC+4)	Cabral 33', 74'; Frei (yellow card) 42'; Kasami 62'	Report	Andrade (yellow card) 81'	Stadium: St. Jakob-Park; Attendance: 10,059; Referee: Fran Jović (Croatia)

==== Knockout round play-off ====
18 February 2022 First leg	Marseille (France)	3 – 1	(Azerbaijan) Qarabağ	Marseille, France
00:00 AZT (UTC+4)	Ünder (yellow card) 36'; Milik 41', 44'; Luan Peres (yellow card) 66'; Dieng (yellow card) 77'; Payet 90+2'	Report	Kady 85'	Stadium: Stade Vélodrome; Attendance: 25,713; Referee: Nikola Dabanović (Montenegro)

24 February 2022 Second leg	Qarabağ (Azerbaijan)	0 – 3 (1 – 6 agg.)	(France) Marseille	Baku, Azerbaijan
20:45 AZT (UTC+4)	Ozobić (yellow card) 36'; Medina (yellow card) 48'; Kady (yellow card) 57'	Report	Gueye 12' (yellow card) 36'; Álvaro (yellow card) 36'; Ćaleta-Car (yellow card) 43'; Bakambu (yellow card) 53'; Payet (yellow card) 73'; Guendouzi 77'; De la Fuente 90+2'	Stadium: Tofig Bahramov Stadium; Attendance: 27,783; Referee: Bartosz Frankowski (Poland)
Note: Qarabağ played their home match at Tofiq Bahramov Republican Stadium, Baku, instead of their regular stadium Azersun Arena, Baku, which did not meet UEFA requirements.

== Squad statistics ==
As of match played 27 May 2022

=== Appearances and goals ===
No.	Pos	Nat	Player	Total		Premier League		Azerbaijan Cup		Europa Conference League	
No.	Pos	Nat	Player	Apps	Goals	Apps	Goals	Apps	Goals	Apps	Goals
1	GK	(Azerbaijan) AZE	Shahrudin Mahammadaliyev	32	0	17	0	3	0	12	0
2	MF	(Azerbaijan) AZE	Gara Garayev	39	0	16+5	0	4	0	14	0
5	DF	(Azerbaijan) AZE	Maksim Medvedev	36	2	18+1	1	4	0	13	1
6	MF	(Cape Verde) CPV	Patrick Andrade	39	4	22+1	2	3	1	13	1
7	MF	(Azerbaijan) AZE	Richard Almeida	21	0	12+4	0	0	0	0+5	0
10	MF	(France) FRA	Abdellah Zoubir	43	12	17+8	8	3+1	1	14	3
11	FW	(Spain) ESP	Jaime Romero	11	1	2+1	0	0+1	0	7	1
12	GK	(Azerbaijan) AZE	Emil Balayev	5	0	5	0	0	0	0	0
13	DF	(Azerbaijan) AZE	Bahlul Mustafazade	21	0	13+3	0	2	0	0+3	0
15	MF	(Cape Verde) CPV	Leandro Andrade	15	4	6+3	3	3+2	1	0+1	0
18	MF	(Azerbaijan) AZE	Ismayil Ibrahimli	26	2	10+5	1	3	1	1+7	0
19	MF	(Azerbaijan) AZE	Filip Ozobić	41	12	17+7	11	2+2	0	11+2	1
20	MF	(Brazil) BRA	Kady	44	20	21+4	12	4+1	3	10+4	5
21	DF	(Azerbaijan) AZE	Rauf Huseynli	1	1	1	1	0	0	0	0
22	FW	(Azerbaijan) AZE	Musa Gurbanlı	23	9	10+5	8	2	1	0+6	0
23	GK	(Georgia (country)) GEO	Luka Gugeshashvili	8	0	4	0	2	0	2	0
24	DF	(Azerbaijan) AZE	Zamiq Aliyev	1	0	1	0	0	0	0	0
25	FW	(Senegal) SEN	Ibrahima Wadji	28	16	12+4	11	3+1	4	8	1
27	MF	(Azerbaijan) AZE	Toral Bayramov	36	1	15+4	0	2+1	0	14	1
29	DF	(Montenegro) MNE	Marko Vešović	39	3	18+4	3	4+1	0	2+10	0
30	DF	(Azerbaijan) AZE	Abbas Huseynov	31	1	13+3	0	1+2	0	12	1
44	MF	(Azerbaijan) AZE	Elvin Cafarguliyev	14	1	8+2	1	3	0	0+1	0
55	DF	(Azerbaijan) AZE	Badavi Huseynov	4	0	1+2	0	0+1	0	0	0
77	FW	(Azerbaijan) AZE	Ramil Sheydayev	44	13	16+9	7	3+2	4	6+8	2
81	DF	(Colombia) COL	Kevin Medina	41	1	22+1	1	4	0	14	0
83	DF	(Azerbaijan) AZE	Nihad Guliyev	1	0	0+1	0	0	0	0	0
89	GK	(Azerbaijan) AZE	Amin Ramazanov	2	0	2	0	0	0	0	0
97	FW	(Azerbaijan) AZE	Rustam Akhmedzade	8	0	2+4	0	0+1	0	0+1	0
Players away on loan:
4	DF	(Azerbaijan) AZE	Rahil Mammadov	4	0	2+1	0	0	0	1	0
17	MF	(Spain) ESP	Gaspar Panadero	4	0	4	0	0	0	0	0
Players who left Qarabağ during the season:

=== Goal scorers ===
Place	Position	Nation	Number	Name	Premier League	Azerbaijan Cup	Europa Conference League	Total
1	MF	(Brazil)	20	Kady	12	3	5	20
2	FW	(Senegal)	25	Ibrahima Wadji	11	4	1	16
3	FW	(Azerbaijan)	77	Ramil Sheydayev	7	4	2	13
4	MF	(Azerbaijan)	19	Filip Ozobić	11	0	1	12
4	MF	(France)	10	Abdellah Zoubir	8	1	3	12
6	FW	(Azerbaijan)	22	Musa Gurbanlı	8	1	0	9
7	MF	(Cape Verde)	15	Leandro Andrade	3	1	0	4
7	MF	(Cape Verde)	6	Patrick Andrade	2	1	1	4
9	DF	(Montenegro)	29	Marko Vešović	3	0	0	3
9				Own goal	2	0	1	3
11	MF	(Azerbaijan)	18	Ismayil Ibrahimli	1	1	0	2
11	DF	(Azerbaijan)	5	Maksim Medvedev	1	0	1	2
13	DF	(Colombia)	81	Kevin Medina	1	0	0	1
13	MF	(Azerbaijan)	44	Elvin Cafarguliyev	1	0	0	1
13	DF	(Azerbaijan)	21	Rauf Huseynli	1	0	0	1
13	FW	(Spain)	11	Jaime Romero	0	0	1	1
13	MF	(Azerbaijan)	27	Toral Bayramov	0	0	1	1
13	DF	(Azerbaijan)	30	Abbas Huseynov	0	0	1	1
				TOTALS	72	16	18	106

=== Clean sheets ===
Place	Position	Nation	Number	Name	Premier League	Azerbaijan Cup	Europa Conference League	Total
1	GK	(Azerbaijan)	1	Shahrudin Mahammadaliyev	10	1	5	16
2	GK	(Georgia (country))	23	Luka Gugeshashvili	2	2	0	4
3	GK	(Azerbaijan)	12	Emil Balayev	3	0	0	3
4	GK	(Azerbaijan)	89	Amin Ramazanov	2	0	0	2
				TOTALS	17	3	5	25

=== Disciplinary record ===
Number	Nation	Position	Name	Premier League		Azerbaijan Cup		Europa Conference League		Total	
Number	Nation	Position	Name	Yellow card	Red card	Yellow card	Red card	Yellow card	Red card	Yellow card	Red card
1	(Azerbaijan)	GK	Shahrudin Mahammadaliyev	2	0	0	0	3	0	5	0
2	(Azerbaijan)	MF	Gara Garayev	5	0	1	0	1	0	7	0
5	(Azerbaijan)	DF	Maksim Medvedev	2	0	1	0	2	1	5	1
6	(Cape Verde)	MF	Patrick Andrade	7	1	0	0	5	0	12	1
7	(Azerbaijan)	MF	Richard Almeida	4	0	0	0	0	0	4	0
13	(Azerbaijan)	DF	Bahlul Mustafazade	4	0	0	0	0	0	4	0
15	(Cape Verde)	MF	Leandro Andrade	0	0	1	0	0	0	1	0
18	(Azerbaijan)	MF	Ismayil Ibrahimli	2	0	0	0	2	0	4	0
19	(Azerbaijan)	MF	Filip Ozobić	4	0	1	0	3	0	8	0
20	(Brazil)	MF	Kady	3	0	0	0	4	0	7	0
21	(Azerbaijan)	DF	Rauf Huseynli	1	0	0	0	0	0	1	0
22	(Azerbaijan)	FW	Musa Gurbanlı	0	0	0	0	1	0	1	0
24	(Azerbaijan)	DF	Zamiq Aliyev	1	0	0	0	0	0	1	0
25	(Senegal)	FW	Ibrahima Wadji	0	0	0	0	1	0	1	0
27	(Azerbaijan)	MF	Toral Bayramov	2	0	1	0	2	0	5	0
29	(Montenegro)	DF	Marko Vešović	3	0	1	0	0	0	4	0
30	(Azerbaijan)	DF	Abbas Huseynov	1	0	0	0	1	0	2	0
44	(Azerbaijan)	MF	Elvin Cafarguliyev	2	0	1	0	0	0	3	0
77	(Azerbaijan)	FW	Ramil Sheydayev	2	0	1	0	0	0	3	0
81	(Colombia)	DF	Kevin Medina	5	0	1	0	3	0	9	0
Players away on loan:
4	(Azerbaijan)	DF	Rahil Mammadov	1	0	0	0	0	0	1	0
Players who left Qarabağ during the season:
			TOTALS	51	1	9	0	28	1	88	2
