= 2022–23 Qarabağ FK season =

Qarabağ
2022–23 season
- President: Tahir Gözal
- Manager: Gurban Gurbanov
- Stadium: Azersun Arena
- Premier League: 1st
- Azerbaijan Cup: Quarter-final vs Gabala
- Champions League: Play-off round vs Viktoria Plzeň
- Europa League: Group stage
- Europa Conference League: Knockout round play-off vs Gent
- Top goalscorer: League: Ramil Sheydayev (22 goals); All: Ramil Sheydayev; Musa Qurbanlı (23 each)
Home colours	Away colours	Third colours

The Qarabağ 2022–23 season was Qarabağ's 30th Azerbaijan Premier League season and their fourteenth season under manager Gurban Gurbanov. Domestically, Qarabağ defended their Premier League, their eighth in nine years, and where knocked out of the Azerbaijan Cup by Gabala in the Quarterfinals. In European competition, Qarabağ began in the Champions League, where they reached the Playoff round before defeat to Viktoria Plzeň, meaning they dropped into the Group Stage of the Europa League. In the Europa League they finished third in their group behind SC Freiburg and Nantes, progressing to the Knockout round play-off of the Europa Conference League where they were eliminated by Gent on penalties.

== Season overview ==
On 4 January, Qarabağ and Krasnodar agreed the transfer of Kady to the Russian club.

On 5 January, Qarabağ announced that Marko Vešović had extended his contract with the club until 30 June 2025. On 10 January, Qarabağ announced that Shakhruddin Magomedaliyev had extended his contract with the club until 30 June 2026.

On 13 January, Qarabağ announced the signing of Adama Diakhaby on a contract until 30 June 2025.

On 24 January, Qarabağ announced the signing of Redon Xhixha from Tirana on a contract until 30 June 2026.

On 26 January, Qarabağ announced the signing of Yassine Benzia from Dijon on a contract until 30 June 2025.

On 30 January, Owusu Kwabena left Qarabağ to join Ferencváros.

On 31 May, Qarabağ announced that Filip Ozobić and Ramil Sheydayev had left the club following the expiration of their contracts.

== Squad ==
As of match played 28 May 2023

No.	Name	Nationality	Position	Date of birth (age)	Signed from	Signed in	Contract ends	Apps.	Goals
Goalkeepers
1	Shahrudin Mahammadaliyev	(Azerbaijan)	GK	12 June 1994 (aged 28)	Sumgayit	2015	2026	130	0
23	Luka Gugeshashvili	(Georgia (country))	GK	29 April 1999 (aged 24)	Jagiellonia Białystok	2022	2025	30	0
89	Amin Ramazanov	(Azerbaijan)	GK	20 January 2003 (aged 20)	Lokomotiv Moscow	2021		7	0
Defenders
4	Rahil Mammadov	(Azerbaijan)	DF	24 November 1995 (aged 27)	Sabail	2018	2021	70	2
5	Maksim Medvedev	(Azerbaijan)	DF	29 September 1989 (aged 33)	Youth team	2006		522+	17+
13	Bahlul Mustafazade	(Azerbaijan)	DF	27 February 1997 (aged 26)	Unattached	2021	2024	60	2
27	Toral Bayramov	(Azerbaijan)	DF	23 February 2001 (aged 22)	Academy	2019		102	4
29	Marko Vešović	(Montenegro)	DF	2 May 1996 (aged 27)	Legia Warsaw	2021	2025	78	5
30	Abbas Huseynov	(Azerbaijan)	DF	13 June 1995 (aged 27)	Inter Baku	2017		133	3
44	Elvin Cafarguliyev	(Azerbaijan)	DF	26 October 2000 (aged 22)	Youth team	2019		89	6
55	Badavi Huseynov	(Azerbaijan)	DF	11 July 1991 (aged 31)	Anzhi Makhachkala	2012		315	5
81	Kevin Medina	(Colombia)	DF	9 March 1993 (aged 30)	Chaves	2020	2023	103	2
Midfielders
2	Gara Garayev	(Azerbaijan)	MF	12 October 1992 (aged 30)	Youth team	2008		466	5
6	Júlio Romão	(Brazil)	MF	29 March 1998 (aged 25)	Santa Clara	2022	2026	41	1
7	Yassine Benzia	(Algeria)	MF	8 September 1994 (aged 28)	Dijon	2023	2025	5	0
8	Marko Janković	(Montenegro)	MF	9 July 1995 (aged 27)	Hapoel Tel Aviv	2022		39	2
10	Abdellah Zoubir	(France)	MF	5 December 1991 (aged 31)	RC Lens	2018		208	46
15	Leandro Andrade	(Cape Verde)	MF	24 September 1999 (aged 23)	Cherno More	2021	2025	50	12
18	Ismayil Ibrahimli	(Azerbaijan)	MF	13 February 1998 (aged 25)	MOIK Baku	2018		107	7
19	Filip Ozobić	(Azerbaijan)	MF	8 April 1991 (aged 32)	Gabala	2018		150	41
20	Richard Almeida	(Azerbaijan)	MF	20 March 1989 (aged 34)	Zira	2021		348	58
90	Nariman Akhundzade	(Azerbaijan)	MF	23 April 2004 (aged 19)	Youth team	2022		9	0
Forwards
9	Musa Qurbanlı	(Azerbaijan)	FW	13 April 2002 (aged 21)	Youth team	2019		68	33
77	Ramil Sheydayev	(Azerbaijan)	FW	15 March 1996 (aged 27)	Sabah	2021		112	37
87	Adama Diakhaby	(France)	FW	5 July 1996 (aged 26)	Unattached	2023	2025	10	0
99	Redon Xhixha	(Albania)	FW	14 September 1998 (aged 24)	Tirana	2023	2026	15	1
Away on loan
	Zamig Aliyev	(Azerbaijan)	DF	5 May 2001 (aged 22)	Youth team	2020		1	0
	Nihad Guliyev	(Azerbaijan)	DF	19 July 2001 (aged 21)	Youth team	2020		1	0
	Hajiagha Hajili	(Azerbaijan)	MF	30 January 1998 (aged 25)	Gabala	2019	2023	11	0
	Ruslan Hajiyev	(Azerbaijan)	MF	20 March 1998 (aged 25)	Youth team	2018		0	0
	Rustam Akhmedzade	(Azerbaijan)	FW	25 December 2000 (aged 22)	Mynai	2021	2026	8	0
Also under contract
17	Gaspar Panadero	(Spain)	MF	9 December 1997 (aged 25)	Cádiz	2021	2024	4	0
Left during the season
11	Owusu Kwabena	(Ghana)	FW	18 June 1997 (aged 25)	Leganés	2020	2023	78	19
20	Kady	(Brazil)	MF	2 May 1996 (aged 27)	Vilafranquense	2021	2023 (+1)	75	28
25	Ibrahima Wadji	(Senegal)	FW	5 May 1995 (aged 28)	Haugesund	2021	2024	36	20

=== Out on loan ===
Note: Flags indicate national team as defined under FIFA eligibility rules; some limited exceptions apply. Players may hold more than one non-FIFA nationality.

No.	Pos.	Nation	Player
—	DF	AZE	Zamig Aliyev (at Kapaz)
—	DF	AZE	Nihad Guliyev (at Shamakhi)
—	MF	AZE	Hajiagha Hajili (at Zira)

No.	Pos.	Nation	Player
—	MF	AZE	Ruslan Hajiyev (at Sabail)
—	FW	AZE	Rustam Akhmedzade (at Zira)

== Transfers ==
=== In ===
Date	Position	Nationality	Name	From	Fee	Ref.
1 July 2022	GK	(Georgia (country))	Luka Gugeshashvili	Jagiellonia Białystok	Undisclosed	
1 July 2022	MF	(Montenegro)	Marko Janković	Hapoel Tel Aviv	Undisclosed	
17 July 2022	MF	(Brazil)	Júlio Romão	Santa Clara	Undisclosed	
13 January 2023	FW	(France)	Adama Diakhaby	Unattached	Free	
24 January 2023	FW	(Albania)	Redon Xhixha	Tirana	Undisclosed	
26 January 2023	MF	(Algeria)	Yassine Benzia	Dijon	Undisclosed	

=== Out ===
Date	Position	Nationality	Name	To	Fee	Ref.
30 August 2022	FW	(Senegal)	Ibrahima Wadji	Saint-Étienne	Undisclosed	
4 January 2023	MF	(Brazil)	Kady	Krasnodar	Undisclosed	
30 January 2023	FW	(Ghana)	Owusu Kwabena	Ferencváros	Undisclosed	

=== Loans out ===
Date from	Position	Nationality	Name	To	Date to	Ref.
5 July 2022	FW	(Azerbaijan)	Rustam Akhmedzade	Zira	End of season	

=== Released ===
Date	Position	Nationality	Name	Joined	Date	Ref
5 June 2022	FW	(Spain)	Jaime Romero	Cartagena		
31 May 2023	MF	(Azerbaijan)	Ruslan Hajiyev			
31 May 2023	MF	(Azerbaijan)	Filip Ozobić	Neftçi	30 June 2023	
31 May 2023	FW	(Azerbaijan)	Ramil Sheydayev	Buriram United		

== Friendlies ==
26 March 2023	Qarabağ	1–2	Galatasaray	Baku
20:00 AZT (UTC+4)	Xhixha 19'; Guerrier (yellow card) 32'; Romão (yellow card) 90'	Report 1 Report 2	Gomis 4'; Kutlu (yellow card) 33'; Zaniolo (yellow card) 56'; Icardi 87' (pen.)	Stadium: Baku Olympic Stadium; Referee: Aliyar Aghayev (Azerbaijan)

== Competitions ==
=== Overview ===
Competition	First match	Last match	Starting round	Final position	Record							
Competition	First match	Last match	Starting round	Final position	Pld	W	D	L	GF	GA	GD	Win %
Premier League	15 August 2022	28 May 2023	Matchday 1	Winners	36	28	6	2	91	25	+66	77.78
Azerbaijan Cup	8 December 2022	19 December 2022	Quarterfinal	Quarterfinal	2	0	1	1	2	3	−1	0.00
UEFA Champions League	5 July 2022	23 August 2022	First qualifying round	Play-off round	8	3	3	2	15	10	+5	37.50
UEFA Europa League	8 September 2022	3 November 2022	Group stage	Group stage	6	2	2	2	9	5	+4	33.33
UEFA Europa Conference League	16 February 2023	24 February 2023	Knockout round play-offs	Knockout round play-offs	2	1	0	1	1	1	+0	50.00
Total					54	34	12	8	118	44	+74	62.96

Last updated: 28 May 2023
Source: Competitions

=== Premier League ===
==== Results summary ====
Overall								Home						Away					
Pld	W	D	L	GF	GA	GD	Pts	W	D	L	GF	GA	GD	W	D	L	GF	GA	GD
36	28	6	2	91	25	+66	90	13	4	1	44	16	+28	15	2	1	47	9	+38

Last updated: 28 May 2023.
Source: See Results

==== Results by round ====
Round	1	2	3	4	5	6	7	8	9	10	11	12	13	14	15	16	17	18	19	20	21	22	23	24	25	26	27	28	29	30	31	32	33	34	35	36
Ground	H	A	H (Note: matchday 4)	A (Note: matchday 5)	H (Note: matchday 6)	A (Note: matchday 7)	H (Note: matchday 8)	A (Note: matchday 9)	H (Note: matchday 10)	H (Note: matchday 11)	A (Note: matchday 12)	H (Note: matchday 13)	A (Note: matchday 3)	A	H	A	H	A	A	H	A	H	A	H	A	H	A	A	H	A	H	A	H	A	H	H
Result	W	W	W	W	W	W	W	W	W	W	W	W	W	D	D	W	W	W	W	W	D	D	W	D	W	W	W	W	W	L	D	W	W	W	L	W
Position	2	3	2	1	1	1	1	1	1	1	1	1	1	1	1	1	1	1	1	1	1	1	1	1	1	1	1	1	1	1	1	1	1	1	1	1

Updated to match(es) played on 28 May 2023. Source: See Results
A = Away; H = Home; W = Win; D = Draw; L = Loss

==== Results ====
6 August 2022 1	Qarabağ	3 – 1	Sabail	Baku
20:00 AZT (UTC+4)	Mustafazadə (yellow card) 3'; Romão (yellow card) 25'; Qurbanlı 42'; Sheydayev 45+2' (pen.), 47'; Mammadov (yellow card) 52'; Qarayev (yellow card) 71'	Report	Taghiyev 72' (yellow card) 86'	Stadium: Azersun Arena; Referee: Rauf Jabbarov

13 August 2022 2	Sumgayit	0 – 2	Qarabağ	Sumgait
18:20 AZT (UTC+4)	Isgandarli (yellow card) 6'; Abdullazade (yellow card) 13'; Pereira (yellow card) 30'; Daničić (yellow card) 79'; Abdullayev (yellow card) 83'	Report	Qurbanlı (yellow card) 30' (goal) 90+3'; Mammadov (yellow card) 90+1'; Ozobić 90+7'	Stadium: Kapital Bank Arena; Referee: Tural Qurbanov

27 August 2022 4	Qarabağ	4 – 0	Shamakhi	Baku
20:30 AZT (UTC+4)	Mustafazadə (yellow card) 16'; Romão (yellow card) 30'; Kwabena 36'; Andrade 55'; Sheydayev 64', 72'	Report	Rahimli (yellow card) 90+2'	Stadium: Azersun Arena; Referee: Nicat İsmayıllı

1 September 2022 5	Kapaz	0 – 1	Qarabağ	Qabala
19:00 AZT (UTC+4)	Rzayev (red card) 50'	Report	Zoubir 44'	Stadium: City Stadium; Referee: Aliyar Agayev

11 September 2022 6	Qarabağ	4 – 3	Sabah	Baku
20:30 AZT (UTC+4)	Qurbanlı 29'; Cafarguliyev 51'; Bayramov (yellow card) 78'; Sheydayev 84' (pen.), 90+3' (pen.)	Report	Ba (yellow card) 18' (yellow-red card) 43'; Apeh 33'; Mickels 60'; Kashchuk 68'; Seydiyev (yellow card) 83'; Camalov (yellow card) 90+2'; Isayev (yellow card) 90+2'; Alekperov (yellow card) 90+2'	Stadium: Azersun Arena; Referee: Ingilab Mammadov

18 September 2022 7	Zira	1 – 7	Qarabağ	Zirə
20:30 AZT (UTC+4)	Hajili (yellow card) 31'; Diniyev 34'; Luković (yellow card) 45+2'	Report	Bayramov 44'; Qurbanlı 56', 60', 79', 84'; Kady (yellow card) 60' (goal) 64'; Sheydayev 68'	Stadium: Zira Olympic Sport Complex Stadium; Referee: Raad Ahmadov

1 October 2022 8	Qarabağ	3 – 1	Neftçi	Baku
18:00 AZT (UTC+4)	Kady 56'; Zoubir 68'; Kwabena 74'; Magomedaliyev (yellow card) 90+2'	Report	Eddy 24'; Stanković (yellow card) 90+2'	Stadium: Azersun Arena; Referee: Ravan Hamzazada

9 October 2022 9	Gabala	0 – 1	Qarabağ	Qabala
17:00 AZT (UTC+4)	Qirtimov (red card) 43'; Abu Akel (yellow card) 68'	Report	Ozobić 58'; Qurbanlı (yellow card) 76'	Stadium: City Stadium; Referee: Nicat İsmayıllı

16 October 2022 10	Qarabağ	3 – 1	Sumgayit	Baku
17:30 AZT (UTC+4)	Ozobić (yellow card) 15'; Sheydayev 67', 88' (pen.); Qurbanlı 73'	Report	Aganspahić 55'; Aliyev (yellow card) 86'	Stadium: Azersun Arena; Referee: Aliyar Agayev

20 October 2022 11	Qarabağ	3 – 0	Turan Tovuz	Baku
19:00 AZT (UTC+4)	Kwabena 2'; Sheydayev 42' (pen.); Ozobić 53'	Report	S.Guliyev (yellow card) 14'	Stadium: Azersun Arena; Referee: Vuqar Hasanli

30 October 2022 12	Shamakhi	0 – 4	Qarabağ	Shamakhi
15:00 AZT (UTC+4)	Naghiyev (yellow card) 18'; Safarov (yellow card) 45+1'	Report	Romão (yellow card) 37'; Janković (yellow card) 40'; Magomedaliyev (yellow card) 45+5'; Qurbanlı 51', 90+3'; Cafarguliyev 57'; C.Hüseynov 90+5' (o.g.)	Stadium: City Stadium; Referee: Rauf Jabbarov

6 November 2022 13	Qarabağ	3 – 1	Kapaz	Baku
19:00 AZT (UTC+4)	Mammadov (yellow card) 8'; Sheydayev 16' (pen.); Qurbanlı 76'; Kwabena 79'	Report	Nabiyev 75'; Kantaria (yellow card) 87'; Akhundov (yellow card) 87'	Stadium: Tofiq Bahramov Republican Stadium; Referee: Ravan Hamzazada

9 November 2022 2	Turan Tovuz	0 – 2	Qarabağ	Tovuz
14:30 AZT (UTC+4)		Report	Masimov 20' (o.g.); Kwabena 37'	Stadium: City Stadium; Referee: Tural Qurbanov

13 November 2022 14	Sabah	0 – 0	Qarabağ	Masazır
17:00 AZT (UTC+4)	Isayev (yellow card) 60'	Report		Stadium: Bank Respublika Arena; Referee: Farid Haciyev

28 November 2022 15	Qarabağ	0 – 0	Zira	Baku
19:00 AZT (UTC+4)	Medvedev (yellow card) 58'; Kwabena (yellow card) 90+1'	Report	Chantakias (yellow card) 90+1'	Stadium: Azersun Arena; Referee: Rauf Allahverdiyev

2 December 2022 16	Neftçi	0 – 4	Qarabağ	Baku
21:00 AZT (UTC+4)	Eddy (yellow card) 66'; Jaber (yellow card) 71'	Report	Kady 37', 83'; Zoubir 60'; Sheydayev 67'; Medina (yellow card) 79'	Stadium: Bakcell Arena; Referee: Elcin Masiyev

13 December 2022 17	Qarabağ	1 – 0	Gabala	Baku
19:00 AZT (UTC+4)	Qarayev (yellow card) 55'; Sheydayev 68' (pen.)	Report	Musayev (yellow card) 86'; Ruan (yellow card) 90+5'	Stadium: Azersun Arena; Referee: Kamranbay Rahimov

24 December 2022 18	Sabail	0 – 3	Qarabağ	Baku
17:30 AZT (UTC+4)	Amirli (yellow card) 75'; Martinov (yellow card) 78'	Report	Mustafazadə (yellow card) 26'; Sheydayev 61'; Cafarguliyev (yellow card) 75'; Qurbanlı 82'; Zoubir 88'	Stadium: Bayil Arena; Referee: Vuqar Hasanli

25 January 2023 19	Turan Tovuz	2 – 3	Qarabağ	Tovuz
14:00 AZT (UTC+4)	Wankewai (yellow card) 5' (goal) 23'; Marakvelidze (yellow card) 13'; Turabov (yellow card) 76'; Shahverdiyev 86'	Report	Qurbanlı 10'; Sheydayev 28'; Vešović (yellow card) 51'; Mustafazadə 89'; Richard (yellow card) 90+3'; Romão (yellow card) 90+3'	Stadium: City Stadium; Referee: Farid Haciyev

31 January 2023 20	Qarabağ	3 – 1	Shamakhi	Baku
16:00 AZT (UTC+4)	Qurbanlı 22' (yellow card) 30'; Qarayev 46'; Zoubir (yellow card) 58'; Andrade 63'	Report	Haziyev 80'; N.Guliyev (yellow card) 87'	Stadium: Azersun Arena; Referee: Kamranbay Rahimov

4 February 2023 21	Kapaz	1 – 1	Qarabağ	Ganja
14:00 AZT (UTC+4)	Isaiah (yellow card) 34' (goal) 49'	Report	Mustafazadə (yellow card) 17'; Qurbanlı 24'; Romão (yellow card) 48'; Vešović (yellow card) 77'	Stadium: City Stadium; Referee: Rauf Jabbarov

11 February 2023 22	Qarabağ	1 – 1	Sabah	Baku
17:00 AZT (UTC+4)	Qurbanlı 15'; Cafarguliyev (yellow card) 32'; Diakhaby (yellow card) 71'	Report	Kashchuk (yellow card) 26'; Jamalov (yellow card) 48'; Həsənalızadə (yellow card) 60' (goal) 75'	Stadium: Azersun Arena; Referee: Elcin Masiyev

19 February 2023 23	Zira	0 – 1	Qarabağ	Zirə
19:00 AZT (UTC+4)	Guerrier (yellow card) 54'; Luković (yellow card) 74'	Report	Medvedev (yellow card) 48'; Aliyev 88' (o.g.); Medina (yellow card) 90+2'; Zoubir (yellow card) 90+6'	Stadium: Zira Olympic Sport Complex Stadium; Referee: Tural Qurbanov

27 February 2023 24	Qarabağ	1 – 1	Neftçi	Baku
20:00 AZT (UTC+4)	Medina (yellow card) 32'; Mammadov (yellow card) 54'; Haghverdi 82' (o.g.); Romão (yellow card) 85'	Report	Eddy (yellow card) 21'; Lebon 33'; Jaber (yellow card) 79'; Stanković (yellow card) 85'	Stadium: Azersun Arena; Referee: Raad Ahmədov

5 March 2023 25	Gabala	1 – 3	Qarabağ	Qabala
17:00 AZT (UTC+4)	Alimi 31' (yellow card) 42'; Isayev (yellow card) 37'	Report	Richard (yellow card) 22'; Romão (yellow card) 31'; Sheydayev 38' (pen.), 68' (pen.); Qurbanlı 56'; Mustafazadə (yellow card) 81'; Medina (yellow card) 90+4'	Stadium: City Stadium; Referee: Kamal Umudlu

11 March 2023 26	Qarabağ	3 – 0	Sabail	Baku
19:00 AZT (UTC+4)	Cafarguliyev 24'; Qurbanlı 34'; Romão 53'	Report	Kizito (yellow card) 61'	Stadium: Azersun Arena; Referee: Ravan Hamzazada

15 March 2023 27	Sumgayit	0 – 6	Qarabağ	Sumgait
18:00 AZT (UTC+4)	Badalov (yellow card) 78'	Report	Andrade 7', 49'; Qurbanlı 12', 45+3'; Zoubir 21'; Abdullazade 88' (o.g.)	Stadium: Kapital Bank Arena; Referee: Javid Jalilov

2 April 2023 28	Shamakhi	0 – 1	Qarabağ	Shamakhi
15:30 AZT (UTC+4)	Mustafayev (yellow card) 65'	Report	Romão (yellow card) 26'; Cafarguliyev 32' (yellow card) 90+3'	Stadium: City Stadium; Referee: Rauf Jabarov

9 April 2023 29	Qarabağ	3 – 1	Kapaz	Baku
18:30 AZT (UTC+4)	Zoubir 5'; Gugeshashvili (yellow card) 28'; Richard 58' (pen.) (yellow card) 82'; Andrade 66'; Cafarguliyev (yellow card) 68'	Report	Khvalko 29'; Aliyev (yellow card) 71'; Alijanov (yellow card) 81'; Kantaria (yellow card) 90+3'	Stadium: Azersun Arena; Referee: Emin Aliyev

16 April 2023 30	Sabah	2 – 1	Qarabağ	Masazır
19:00 AZT (UTC+4)	Mutallimov (yellow card) 14'; Mickels 72', 77'	Report	Romão (yellow card) 13'; Richard 86' (pen.)	Stadium: Bank Respublika Arena; Referee: Tural Qurbanov

21 April 2023 31	Qarabağ	2 – 2	Zira	Baku
20:00 AZT (UTC+4)	Medina (yellow card) 40'; Cafarguliyev (yellow card) 41'; Janković 54'; Sheydayev 59'; Qurbanlı (yellow card) 64'; Vešović (yellow card) 87'	Report	Adiléhou (yellow card) 23'; Keyta 62'; Kulach 65'; Alıyev (yellow card) 90'; Taşqın (yellow card) 90+2'	Stadium: Azersun Arena; Referee: Kamranbay Rahimov

2 May 2023 32	Neftçi	2 – 4	Qarabağ	Baku
20:00 AZT (UTC+4)	Stanković (red card) 31'; Saldanha 40'; Mahmudov 64' (pen.); Jaber (yellow card) 90+2'	Report	Sheydayev 11'; Andrade 16'; Saldanha 55' (o.g.); Magomedaliyev (yellow card) 64'; Zoubir 80'	Stadium: Bakcell Arena; Referee: Ingilab Mammadov

8 May 2023 33	Qarabağ	3 – 0	Gabala	Baku
20:00 AZT (UTC+4)	Cafarguliyev 43'; Romão (yellow card) 64'; Zoubir 75'; Sheydayev 84'; Richard (yellow card) 89'	Report	Isayev (yellow card) 69'; Qirtimov (yellow card) 90+1'	Stadium: Azersun Arena; Referee: Ravan Hamzazada

13 May 2023 34	Sabail	0 – 3	Qarabağ	Baku
20:30 AZT (UTC+4)		Report	Medina (yellow card) 17'; Mustafazadə 71'; Sheydayev 77' (pen.), 86'	Stadium: Bayil Arena; Referee: Kamal Umudlu

22 May 2023 35	Qarabağ	1 – 2	Sumgayit	Baku
16:30 AZT (UTC+4)	Guseynov (yellow card) 32'; Sheydayev (yellow card) 73'; Richard 89'	Report	Isgandarli 33' (pen.); Abdullazade 39'; Pereira (yellow card) 55'; Mustafayev (yellow card) 80'	Stadium: Azersun Arena; Referee: Raad Ahmadov

28 May 2023 36	Qarabağ	3 – 1	Turan Tovuz	Baku
19:30 AZT (UTC+4)	Xhixha 2'; Andrade 47'; Qurbanlı 72'	Report	Eva 63'; Miller (yellow card) 66'	Stadium: Azersun Arena; Referee: Ali Aliyev

==== League table ====
Pos	Team	Pld	W	D	L	GF	GA	GD	Pts	Qualification
1	Qarabağ (C)	36	28	6	2	91	25	+66	90	Qualification for the Champions League first qualifying round
2	Sabah	36	25	6	5	75	24	+51	81	Qualification to Europa Conference League second qualifying round
3	Neftçi	36	20	8	8	63	38	+25	68	Qualification to Europa Conference League second qualifying round
4	Gabala	36	13	11	12	47	47	0	50	Qualification to Europa Conference League second qualifying round
5	Zira	36	13	11	12	45	46	−1	50	

Source: Soccerway
Rules for classification: 1) Points; 2) Head-to-head points; 3) Head-to-head goal difference; 4) Head-to-head goals scored; 5) Head-to-head away goals scored (only if two teams); 6) Goal difference; 7) Goals scored.
(C) Champions

=== Azerbaijan Cup ===
8 December 2022 Quarterfinal 1st leg	Qarabağ	2 – 2	Gabala	Baku
20:30 AZT (UTC+4)	Qurbanlı 55', 83'	Report	Safarov 25'; Alimi (yellow card) 74'; Hani (yellow card) 83' (goal) 86'	Stadium: Azersun Arena; Referee: Aliyar Agayev

19 December 2022 Quarterfinal 2nd leg	Gabala	1 – 0 (3 – 2 agg.)	Qarabağ	Qabala
16:00 AZT (UTC+4)	Alimi (yellow card) 16'; Safarov (yellow card) 23'; Qirtimov (yellow card) 35'; Ramon (yellow card) 61' (goal) 71'	Report	A.Hüseynov (yellow card) 50'; Richard (yellow card) 82'; Mammadov (yellow card) 90+3'	Stadium: City Stadium; Referee: Inqilab Mammadov

=== UEFA Champions League ===
==== Qualifying rounds ====
5 July 2022 First qualifying round 1st leg	Lech Poznań (Poland)	1 – 0	(Azerbaijan) Qarabağ	Poznań, Poland
22:00 AZT (UTC+4)	Ishak 41'; Karlström (yellow card) 48'; Szymczak (yellow card) 87'	Report	Richard (yellow card) 36'; Andrade (yellow card) 48'	Stadium: Stadion Poznań; Attendance: 25,118; Referee: José Luis Munuera (Spain)

12 July 2022 First qualifying round 2nd leg	Qarabağ (Azerbaijan)	5 – 1 (5 – 2 agg.)	(Poland) Lech Poznań	Baku, Azerbaijan
20:00 AZT (UTC+4)	Kady 14', 74' (yellow card) 89'; Richard (yellow card) 19'; Medina (yellow card) 30' (goal) 56'; Ozobić 42'; A.Hüseynov 77'; Cafarguliyev (yellow card) 78'	Report	Velde 1'; Milić (yellow card) 55'	Stadium: Tofiq Bahramov Republican Stadium; Attendance: 27,652; Referee: Andrew Madley (England)

19 July 2022 Second qualifying round 1st leg	Qarabağ (Azerbaijan)	3 – 2	(Switzerland) Zürich	Baku, Azerbaijan
20:00 AZT (UTC+4)	Kady 17' (yellow card) 61'; Wadji 36', 66'; Sheydayev (yellow card) 64'	Report	Hornschuh (yellow card) 14'; Kryeziu (yellow card) 16' (goal) 85' (pen.); Aliti (yellow card) 62'; Kamberi 65'; Selnæs (yellow card) 88'	Stadium: Tofiq Bahramov Republican Stadium; Attendance: 30,782; Referee: Irfan Peljto (Bosnia and Herzegovina)

27 July 2022 Second qualifying round 2nd leg	Zürich (Switzerland)	2 – 2 (a.e.t.) (4 – 5 agg.)	(Azerbaijan) Qarabağ	Zürich, Switzerland
21:00 AZT (UTC+4)	Medvedev 4' (o.g.); Kryeziu (yellow card) 36'; Kamberi (yellow card) 60'; Condé (yellow card) 84'; Santini 90+5' (yellow card) 96'; Okita (yellow card) 102'; Hornschuh (yellow card) 105+2'	Report	Vešović (yellow card) 39'; Medvedev (yellow card) 48'; Richard (yellow card) 50'; Kady 56' (yellow card) 76'; Bayramov (yellow card) 73'; Magomedaliyev (yellow card) 90+3'; Zoubir (yellow card) 93'; Owusu 98'	Stadium: Letzigrund; Attendance: 10,237; Referee: Allard Lindhout (Netherlands)

3 August 2022 Third qualifying round 1st leg	Qarabağ (Azerbaijan)	1 – 1	(Hungary) Ferencváros	Baku, Azerbaijan
20:00 AZT (UTC+4)	Janković (yellow card) 28'; Owusu 34'; Mustafazadə (yellow card) 66'	Report	Boli 17'; Botka (yellow card) 61'; Kovačević (yellow card) 82'	Stadium: Tofiq Bahramov Republican Stadium; Attendance: 31,200; Referee: Andreas Ekberg (Sweden)

9 August 2022 Third qualifying round 2nd leg	Ferencváros (Hungary)	1 – 3 (2 – 4 agg.)	(Azerbaijan) Qarabağ	Budapest, Hungary
22:00 AZT (UTC+4)	Thelander (yellow card) 30'; Boli (yellow card) 34'; Botka (yellow card) 84'; Traoré 86'	Report	Zoubir 7'; Janković (yellow card) 31'; Bayramov (yellow card) 62'; Wadji 54', 78'; Sheydayev (yellow card) 84'; Andrade (yellow card) 90+1'; Vešović (yellow card) 90+3'	Stadium: Ferencváros Stadion; Attendance: 18,875; Referee: Carlos del Cerro Grande (Spain)

17 August 2022 Playoff round 1st leg	Qarabağ (Azerbaijan)	0 – 0	(Czech Republic) Viktoria Plzeň	Baku, Azerbaijan
20:45 AZT (UTC+4)	Wadji (yellow card) 66'	Report	Mosquera (yellow card) 23'; Hejda (yellow card) 63'; Kliment (yellow card) 81'	Stadium: Tofiq Bahramov Republican Stadium; Attendance: 31,150; Referee: Slavko Vinčić (Slovenia)

23 August 2022 Playoff round 2nd leg	Viktoria Plzeň (Czech Republic)	2 – 1 (2 – 1 agg.)	(Azerbaijan) Qarabağ	Plzeň, Czech Republic
23:00 AZT (UTC+4)	Pernica (yellow card) 38'; Sýkora (yellow card) 40'; Jemelka (yellow card) 43'; Kopic 58' (yellow card) 90+4'; Kliment 73'; Tijani (yellow card) 74'	Report	Gugeshashvili (yellow card) 19'; Ozobić 38'	Stadium: Doosan Arena; Attendance: 10,963; Referee: Artur Soares Dias (Portugal)

=== UEFA Europa League ===
==== Group stage ====
Pos	Team	Pld	W	D	L	GF	GA	GD	Pts	Qualification
1	(Germany) SC Freiburg	6	4	2	0	13	3	+10	14	Advance to round of 16
2	(France) Nantes	6	3	0	3	6	11	−5	9	Advance to knockout round play-offs
3	(Azerbaijan) Qarabağ	6	2	2	2	9	5	+4	8	Transfer to Europa Conference League
4	(Greece) Olympiacos	6	0	2	4	2	11	−9	2	

Source: UEFA
Rules for classification: Group stage tiebreakers

8 September 2022 1	SC Freiburg (Germany)	2 – 1	(Azerbaijan) Qarabağ	Freiburg im Breisgau, Germany
23:00 AZT (UTC+4)	Grifo 7' (pen.) (yellow card) 45+2'; Dōan 15' (yellow card) 51'	Report	Bayramov (yellow card) 6'; Vešović 39'; Zoubir (yellow card) 82'; Kwabena (yellow card) 90+4'	Stadium: Europa-Park Stadion; Attendance: 31,500; Referee: Erik Lambrechts (Belgium)

15 September 2022 2	Qarabağ (Azerbaijan)	3 – 0	(France) Nantes	Baku, Azerbaijan
20:45 AZT (UTC+4)	Owusu 60'; Zoubir 65'; Janković 72'; Cafarguliyev (yellow card) 87'	Report	Girotto (yellow card) 80'	Stadium: Tofiq Bahramov Republican Stadium; Attendance: 26,495; Referee: Enea Jorgji (Albania)

6 October 2022 3	Olympiacos (Greece)	0 – 3	(Azerbaijan) Qarabağ	Piraeus, Greece
23:00 AZT (UTC+4)	Valbuena (yellow card) 88'	Report	Cafarguliyev (yellow card) 34'; Owusu 68'; Vešović 82'; Sheydayev 86' (yellow card) 86'; Qarayev (yellow card) 88'	Stadium: Karaiskakis Stadium; Attendance: 21,677; Referee: Irfan Peljto (Bosnia and Herzegovina)

13 October 2022 4	Qarabağ (Azerbaijan)	0 – 0	(Greece) Olympiacos	Baku, Azerbaijan
20:45 AZT (UTC+4)	Richard (yellow card) 66'; Romão (yellow card) 83'; Vešović (yellow card) 88'	Report	Vrsaljko (yellow card) 40'; Papastathopoulos (yellow card) 83'	Stadium: Tofiq Bahramov Republican Stadium; Attendance: 31,200; Referee: Craig Pawson (England)

27 October 2022 5	Nantes (France)	2 – 1	(Azerbaijan) Qarabağ	Nantes, France
23:00 AZT (UTC+4)	Blas 16'; Bamba (yellow card) 41'; Girotto (yellow card) 60'; Ganago 90+4'; Chirivella (yellow card) 90+4'	Report	Ozobić 56' (pen.); Vešović (yellow card) 82'	Stadium: Stade de la Beaujoire; Attendance: 30,927; Referee: Jakob Kehlet (Denmark)

3 November 2022 6	Qarabağ (Azerbaijan)	1 – 1	(Germany) SC Freiburg	Baku, Azerbaijan
21:45 AZT (UTC+4)	Mustafazadə (yellow card) 24'; Janković (yellow card) 48'; Kady (yellow card) 55'; Medina (red card) 61'; Owusu 90+2'; Romão (yellow card) 90+3'	Report	Petersen 25' (pen.); Schade (yellow card) 34'; Siquet (yellow card) 51'; Keitel (yellow card) 64'; Schlotterbeck (yellow card) 74'	Stadium: Tofiq Bahramov Republican Stadium; Attendance: 30,430; Referee: Aleksei Kulbakov (Belarus)

=== UEFA Europa Conference League ===
==== Knockout round play-off ====
16 February 2023 First leg	Qarabağ (Azerbaijan)	1 – 0	(Belgium) Gent	Baku, Azerbaijan
21:45 AZT (UTC+4)	Sheydayev (penalty missed) 52'; Andrade 78'; Gugeshashvili (yellow card) 90+2'; Xhixha (yellow card) 90+7'	Report	Torunarigha (yellow card) 51'; De Sart (yellow card) 71'; Marreh (yellow card) 90+4'	Stadium: Tofiq Bahramov Republican Stadium; Attendance: 25,452; Referee: Mohammed Al-Hakim (Sweden)

24 February 2023 Second leg	Gent (Belgium)	1–0 (a.e.t.) (1–1 agg.) (5–4 p)	(Azerbaijan) Qarabağ	Ghent, Belgium
00:00 AZT (UTC+4)	Depoitre (yellow card) 52'; Orban 74'; Fortuna (yellow card) 77'; Cuypers (yellow card) 86'	Report	Vešović (yellow card) 14'; Qurbanlı (yellow card) 41'; Romão (yellow card) 51'	Stadium: Ghelamco Arena; Referee: Willie Collum (Scotland)
	Penalties
	De Sart (penalty scored); Cuypers (penalty scored); Orban (penalty scored); Marreh (penalty scored); Van Daele (penalty scored)		(penalty scored) Richard; (penalty scored) Diakhaby; (penalty scored) Bayramov; (penalty missed) Benzia

== Squad statistics ==
As of match played 28 May 2023

=== Appearances and goals ===
No.	Pos	Nat	Player	Total		Premier League		Azerbaijan Cup		Champions League		Europa League		Europa Conference League	
No.	Pos	Nat	Player	Apps	Goals	Apps	Goals	Apps	Goals	Apps	Goals	Apps	Goals	Apps	Goals
1	GK	(Azerbaijan) AZE	Shahrudin Mahammadaliyev	26	0	11	0	1	0	8	0	6	0	0	0
2	MF	(Azerbaijan) AZE	Qara Qarayev	42	1	17+11	1	1+1	0	5+1	0	5	0	0+1	0
4	DF	(Azerbaijan) AZE	Rahil Mammadov	15	0	11+2	0	2	0	0	0	0	0	0	0
5	DF	(Azerbaijan) AZE	Maksim Medvedev	21	0	12+3	0	1	0	4	0	0+1	0	0	0
6	MF	(Brazil) BRA	Júlio Romão	41	1	24+6	1	1	0	0+2	0	0+6	0	2	0
7	MF	(Algeria) ALG	Yassine Benzia	5	0	2+1	0	0	0	0	0	0	0	0+2	0
8	MF	(Montenegro) MNE	Marko Janković	39	2	15+8	1	2	0	6+2	0	3+2	1	1	0
9	FW	(Azerbaijan) AZE	Musa Qurbanlı	38	23	26+6	21	2	2	0	0	0+2	0	2	0
10	MF	(France) FRA	Abdellah Zoubir	50	10	21+11	8	0+2	0	8	1	6	1	2	0
13	DF	(Azerbaijan) AZE	Bəhlul Mustafazadə	39	2	25	2	1	0	4+1	0	6	0	2	0
15	MF	(Cape Verde) CPV	Leandro Andrade	35	8	23+3	7	0+1	0	1+2	0	1+2	0	2	1
18	MF	(Azerbaijan) AZE	Ismayil Ibrahimli	21	0	8+9	0	2	0	0+2	0	0	0	0	0
19	MF	(Azerbaijan) AZE	Filip Ozobić	30	6	10+10	3	0	0	4+2	2	2+2	1	0	0
20	MF	(Azerbaijan) AZE	Richard Almeida	43	3	16+10	3	0+2	0	5+2	0	4+2	0	1+1	0
23	GK	(Georgia (country)) GEO	Luka Gugeshashvili	23	0	20	0	1	0	0	0	0	0	2	0
27	DF	(Azerbaijan) AZE	Toral Bayramov	34	1	10+8	1	2	0	4+4	0	2+3	0	0+1	0
29	DF	(Montenegro) MNE	Marko Vešović	39	2	17+6	0	0	0	8	0	6	2	2	0
30	DF	(Azerbaijan) AZE	Abbas Hüseynov	21	1	10+3	0	1	0	0+3	1	0+4	0	0	0
44	DF	(Azerbaijan) AZE	Elvin Cafarguliyev	43	5	26+3	5	0+2	0	4	0	4+2	0	2	0
55	DF	(Azerbaijan) AZE	Badavi Guseynov	32	0	13+7	0	1	0	4+1	0	4	0	2	0
77	FW	(Azerbaijan) AZE	Ramil Sheydayev	53	23	24+11	22	2	0	3+5	0	3+3	1	2	0
81	DF	(Colombia) COL	Kevin Medina	29	1	19+4	0	0	0	4	1	2	0	0	0
87	FW	(France) FRA	Adama Diakhaby	10	0	4+4	0	0	0	0	0	0	0	0+2	0
89	GK	(Azerbaijan) AZE	Amin Ramazanov	5	0	5	0	0	0	0	0	0	0	0	0
90	MF	(Azerbaijan) AZE	Nariman Akhundzade	9	0	2+7	0	0	0	0	0	0	0	0	0
99	FW	(Albania) ALB	Redon Xhixha	15	1	5+8	1	0	0	0	0	0	0	0+2	0
Players away on loan:
Players who left Qarabağ during the season:
11	FW	(Ghana) GHA	Owusu Kwabena	34	10	11+7	5	2	0	1+7	2	6	3	0	0
20	MF	(Brazil) BRA	Kady	31	8	9+7	4	0+2	0	7	4	6	0	0	0
25	FW	(Senegal) SEN	Ibrahima Wadji	8	4	0	0	0	0	8	4	0	0	0	0

=== Goal scorers ===
Place	Position	Nation	Number	Name	Premier League	Azerbaijan Cup	Champions League	Europa League	Europa Conference League	Total
1	FW	(Azerbaijan)	77	Ramil Sheydayev	22	0	0	1	0	23
1	FW	(Azerbaijan)	22	Musa Qurbanlı	21	2	0	0	0	23
3	MF	(France)	10	Abdellah Zoubir	8	0	1	1	0	10
3	FW	(Ghana)	11	Owusu Kwabena	5	0	2	3	0	10
5	MF	(Cape Verde)	15	Leandro Andrade	7	0	0	0	1	8
5	MF	(Brazil)	20	Kady	4	0	4	0	0	8
7	MF	(Azerbaijan)	19	Filip Ozobić	3	0	2	1	0	6
7				Own goal	6	0	0	0	0	6
9	DF	(Azerbaijan)	44	Elvin Cafarguliyev	5	0	0	0	0	5
10	FW	(Senegal)	25	Ibrahima Wadji	0	0	4	0	0	4
11	MF	(Azerbaijan)	20	Richard Almeida	3	0	0	0	0	3
12	DF	(Azerbaijan)	13	Bəhlul Mustafazadə	2	0	0	0	0	2
12	MF	(Montenegro)	8	Marko Janković	1	0	0	1	0	2
12	DF	(Montenegro)	29	Marko Vešović	0	0	0	2	0	2
15	DF	(Azerbaijan)	27	Toral Bayramov	1	0	0	0	0	1
15	MF	(Azerbaijan)	2	Qara Qarayev	1	0	0	0	0	1
15	MF	(Brazil)	6	Júlio Romão	1	0	0	0	0	1
15	FW	(Albania)	99	Redon Xhixha	1	0	0	0	0	1
15	DF	(Colombia)	81	Kevin Medina	0	0	1	0	0	1
15	DF	(Azerbaijan)	30	Abbas Hüseynov	0	0	1	0	0	1
				TOTALS	91	2	15	9	1	118

=== Clean sheets ===
Place	Position	Nation	Number	Name	Premier League	Azerbaijan Cup	Champions League	Europa League	Europa Conference League	Total
1	GK	(Azerbaijan)	1	Shakhruddin Magomedaliyev	9	0	1	3	0	13
2	GK	(Georgia (country))	23	Luka Gugeshashvili	8	0	0	0	1	9
				TOTALS	17	0	1	3	1	22

=== Disciplinary record ===
Number	Nation	Position	Name	Premier League		Azerbaijan Cup		Champions League		Europa League		Europa Conference League		Total	
Number	Nation	Position	Name	Yellow card	Red card	Yellow card	Red card	Yellow card	Red card	Yellow card	Red card	Yellow card	Red card	Yellow card	Red card
1	(Azerbaijan)	GK	Shakhruddin Magomedaliyev	3	0	0	0	1	0	0	0	0	0	4	0
2	(Azerbaijan)	MF	Qara Qarayev	2	0	0	0	0	0	1	0	0	0	3	0
4	(Azerbaijan)	DF	Rahil Mammadov	4	0	1	0	0	0	0	0	0	0	5	0
5	(Azerbaijan)	DF	Maksim Medvedev	1	0	0	0	1	0	0	0	0	0	2	0
6	(Brazil)	MF	Júlio Romão	10	0	0	0	0	0	2	0	1	0	13	0
8	(Montenegro)	MF	Marko Janković	1	0	0	0	2	0	1	0	0	0	4	0
9	(Azerbaijan)	FW	Musa Qurbanlı	4	0	0	0	0	0	0	0	1	0	5	0
10	(France)	MF	Abdellah Zoubir	1	0	0	0	1	0	1	0	0	0	3	0
13	(Azerbaijan)	DF	Bəhlul Mustafazadə	5	0	0	0	1	0	1	0	0	0	7	0
15	(Cape Verde)	MF	Leandro Andrade	0	0	0	0	2	0	0	0	0	0	2	0
19	(Azerbaijan)	MF	Filip Ozobić	1	0	0	0	0	0	0	0	0	0	1	0
20	(Azerbaijan)	MF	Richard Almeida	4	0	1	0	3	0	1	0	0	0	9	0
23	(Georgia (country))	GK	Luka Gugeshashvili	1	0	0	0	1	0	0	0	1	0	3	0
27	(Azerbaijan)	DF	Toral Bayramov	1	0	0	0	2	0	1	0	0	0	4	0
29	(Montenegro)	DF	Marko Vešović	3	0	0	0	2	0	2	0	1	0	8	0
30	(Azerbaijan)	DF	Abbas Hüseynov	0	0	1	0	0	0	0	0	0	0	1	0
44	(Azerbaijan)	DF	Elvin Cafarguliyev	5	0	0	0	1	0	2	0	0	0	8	0
55	(Azerbaijan)	DF	Badavi Guseynov	1	0	0	0	0	0	0	0	0	0	1	0
77	(Azerbaijan)	FW	Ramil Sheydayev	1	0	0	0	2	0	1	0	0	0	4	0
81	(Colombia)	DF	Kevin Medina	5	0	0	0	1	0	0	1	0	0	6	1
87	(France)	FW	Adama Diakhaby	1	0	0	0	0	0	0	0	0	0	1	0
99	(Albania)	FW	Redon Xhixha	0	0	0	0	0	0	0	0	1	0	1	0
Players away on loan:
Players who left Qarabağ during the season:
11	(Ghana)	FW	Owusu Kwabena	1	0	0	0	0	0	1	0	0	0	2	0
20	(Brazil)	MF	Kady	1	0	0	0	3	0	1	0	0	0	5	0
25	(Senegal)	FW	Ibrahima Wadji	0	0	0	0	1	0	0	0	0	0	1	0
			TOTALS	56	0	3	0	24	0	15	1	5	0	103	1
