= Behlul Mustafazade =

Azerbaijani footballer (born 1997)

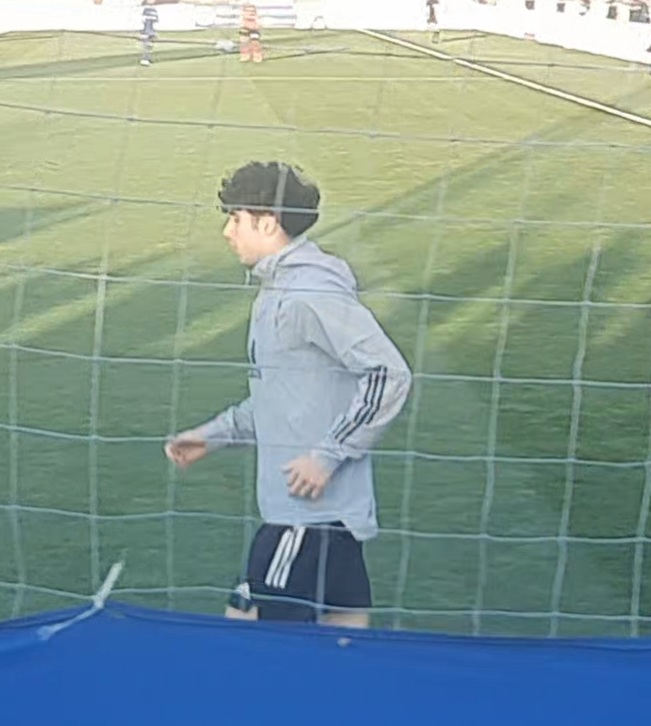
- Mustafazade in 2021

Personal information
- Full name: Bəhlul Ələmdar oğlu Mustafazadə
- Date of birth: 27 February 1997 (age 29)
- Place of birth: Baku, Azerbaijan
- Height: 1.90 m (6 ft 3 in)
- Position: Centre-back

Team information
- Current team: Qarabağ
- Number: 13

Youth career
- Gabala

Senior career*
Years	Team	Apps	(Gls)
2016–2019	Gabala	29	(1)
2017–2018	→ Sumgayit (loan)	23	(2)
2019–2021	Sabah	37	(3)
2021–	Qarabağ	89	(3)

International career^{‡}
2013	Azerbaijan U17	3	(0)
2014–2015	Azerbaijan U19	8	(1)
2017–2018	Azerbaijan U21	15	(0)
2019–	Azerbaijan	43	(1)
- * Club domestic league appearances and goals as of 24 February 2026 ‡ National team caps and goals as of 18:50, 16 November 2025 (UTC)

Behlul Mustafazade (Azerbaijani: Bəhlul Ələmdar oğlu Mustafazadə; born 27 February 1997) is an Azerbaijani professional footballer who plays as a defender for Azerbaijan Premier League club Qarabağ and the Azerbaijan national team.

== Club career ==
On 7 February 2017, Mustafazadə joined Sumgayit FK on loan from Gabala FK. On 26 June 2019, Mustafazadə signed a three-year contract with Sabah.

In the summer of 2021, Mustafazadə left Sabah to sign for Al Ain, however the UAE club subsequently cancelled the transfer, leaving Mustafazadə a free agent.

On 29 July 2021, Qarabağ announced the signing of Mustafazadə to a three-year contract. On 21 January 2026, he scored his first UEFA Champions League goal in the stoppage time of a 3–2 victory over Eintracht Frankfurt, becoming the first Azerbaijani player to achieve this feat.

== International career ==
Mustafazadə made his debut for Azerbaijan on 6 September 2019 in their UEFA Euro 2020 qualifying match against Wales.

He scored his first international goal on 22 March 2024 against Mongolia during the 2024 FIFA Series at the Tofiq Bahramov Republican Stadium.

== Career statistics ==
=== Club ===
As of match played 21 January 2026

Club	Season	League			National Cup		Continental		Other		Total	
Club	Season	Division	Apps	Goals	Apps	Goals	Apps	Goals	Apps	Goals	Apps	Goals
Gabala	2016–17	Azerbaijan Premier League	0	0	0	0	0	0	—		0	0
Gabala	2017–18	Azerbaijan Premier League	0	0	0	0	0	0	—		0	0
Gabala	2018–19	Azerbaijan Premier League	23	1	5	0	1	0	—		29	1
Gabala	Total		23	1	5	0	1	0	—	—	29	1
Sumgayit (loan)	2016–17	Azerbaijan Premier League	4	0	0	0	—		—		4	0
Sumgayit (loan)	2017–18	Azerbaijan Premier League	16	2	5	0	—		—		21	2
Sumgayit (loan)	Total		20	2	5	0	—	—	—	—	25	2
Sabah	2019–20	Azerbaijan Premier League	18	0	2	2	—		—		20	2
Sabah	2020–21	Azerbaijan Premier League	17	1	0	0	—		—		17	1
Sabah	Total		35	1	2	2	—	—	—	—	37	3
Qarabag	2021–22	Azerbaijan Premier League	16	0	2	0	3 (Note: Appearances in UEFA Europa Conference League)	0	—		21	0
Qarabag	2022–23	Azerbaijan Premier League	25	2	1	0	13 (Note: Six appearances in UEFA Europa League, five appearances in UEFA Champions League and two appearances in UEFA Europa Conference League)	0	—		39	2
Qarabag	2023–24	Azerbaijan Premier League	20	0	6	0	16 (Note: Four appearances and one goal in UEFA Champions League and twelve appearances and one goal in UEFA Europa League)	2	—		42	2
Qarabag	2024–25	Azerbaijan Premier League	20	1	5	0	12 (Note: Six appearances in UEFA Champions League and six appearances in UEFA Europa League)	0	—		37	1
Qarabag	2025–26	Azerbaijan Premier League	5	0	1	0	13 (Note: Appearances in UEFA Champions League)	1	—		19	1
Qarabag	Total		86	3	15	0	57	3	—	—	158	6
Career total			164	7	27	2	58	3	—	—	249	12

=== International ===
As of match played 16 November 2025

Appearances and goals by national team and year
National team	Year	Apps	Goals
Azerbaijan national team	2019	6	0
Azerbaijan national team	2020	4	0
Azerbaijan national team	2021	3	0
Azerbaijan national team	2022	8	0
Azerbaijan national team	2023	6	0
Azerbaijan national team	2024	6	1
Azerbaijan national team	2025	10	0
Total		43	1

== International goals ==
No.	Date	Venue	Opponent	Score	Result	Competition
1.	22 March 2024	Tofiq Bahramov Republican Stadium, Baku, Azerbaijan	Mongolia	1–0	1–0	2024 FIFA Series

== Honours ==
Gabala

- Azerbaijan Cup: 2018–19

Qarabağ

- Azerbaijan Premier League: 2021–22, 2022–23
- Azerbaijan Cup: 2021–22

Individual

- Azerbaijani Footballer of the Year: 2023
