= Kady Borges =

Brazilian footballer (born 1996)

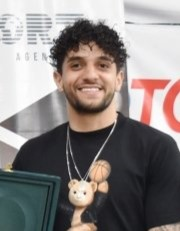
- Kady Borges in 2022

Personal information
- Full name: Kady Iuri Borges Malinowski
- Date of birth: 2 May 1996 (age 30)
- Place of birth: Curitiba, Brazil
- Height: 1.73 m (5 ft 8 in)
- Positions: Winger; attacking midfielder

Team information
- Current team: Qarabağ
- Number: 20

Youth career
- Coritiba

Senior career*
Years	Team	Apps	(Gls)
2016–2019	Coritiba	26	(3)
2017	→ Londrina (loan)	0	(0)
2017	→ Foz do Iguaçu (loan)	0	(0)
2019–2020	Estoril	6	(1)
2020–2021	Vilafranquense	31	(5)
2021–2022	Qarabağ	41	(16)
2023–2024	Krasnodar	33	(5)
2024–2025	Ferencváros	13	(2)
2025–	Qarabağ	36	(9)
- * Club domestic league appearances and goals as of 22 June 2026

Kady Iuri Borges Malinowski (born 2 May 1996) is a Brazilian professional footballer who plays as a winger or attacking midfielder for Azerbaijan Premier League club Qarabağ. Starting his career in his native Curitiba, he then played for Estoril and Vilafranquense in Portugal.

Kady Borges then was transferred to Azerbaijani side Qarabağ, helping his team win the Azerbaijan Premier League and the Azerbaijan Cup in his debut season, also becoming the top scorer of the Azerbaijan Premier League with 12 goals. He made his debut in the group stage of European competitions at Qarabağ, also scoring the best goal of the week of the second round of 2021–22 UEFA Europa Conference League group stage.

== Career ==
=== Coritiba ===
Kady Borges started his professional career at Coritiba.

=== Qarabağ ===
On 11 June 2021, Qarabağ announced the signing of Kady Borges on a two-year contract, with the option of an additional year, from Vilafranquense. Kady debuted on 26 June, in a friendly match with Keşlə, during which he scored his first goal for Qarabağ. Kady Borges made his official debut in Qarabağ on 22 July, during UEFA Europa Conference League qualifying match against Israel's F.C. Ashdod. He scored his first goal for Qarabağ in the next UECL match against Cypriot AEL Limassol, in the 87th minute of the match.

On 15 August, in a match against Zira, he made his official debut in the Azerbaijan Premier League. Kady Borges scored his first goal in the Premier League on 25 October, in away game against the Səbail. He played his debut game in the group stage of a European tournament on 16 September, during a home match against FC Basel. Kady Borges' first goal during an away match against the Cypriot AC Omonia was chosen as the best goal of the week in the second round of the group stage in UECL. This goal was also nominated for the title of the best goal scored in the group stage of the 2021/22 UECL season. He also scored against the French side Olympique de Marseille during the play-off round of UECL.

In his debut season, he helped Qarabağ win the Azerbaijan Premier League, win the Azerbaijan Cup and became the top scorer of the Premier League with 12 goals. On 2 August 2022, Kady Borges signed a new five-year contract with Qarabağ.

=== Krasnodar ===
On 4 January 2023, Qarabağ and Krasnodar agreed the transfer of Kady Borges to the Russian club.

On 24 April 2023, during an away game against Spartak Moscow, Kady had to be taken to the hospital in an ambulance after colliding with his head against Spartak defender's shoulder and losing consciousness for a short time. He reportedly suffered a facial fracture. It was reported that he suffered a concussion and fractures of maxilla and cheekbone.

=== Ferencváros ===
On 8 July 2024, reigning Nemzeti Bajnokság I champions Ferencváros announced the singing of Kady.

=== Return to Qarabağ ===
On 4 February 2025, Qarabağ announced the return of Borges from Ferencváros on a four-year contract.

== Personal life ==
Born in Brazil, Kady Borges is of Polish descent through his paternal grandfather. He started the naturalization process to gain Polish citizenship in November 2022, with the goal of representing the Poland national team.

== Career statistics ==
As of match played 30 January 2025

Appearances and goals by club, season and competition
Club	Season	League			National cup (Note: Includes the Taça de Portugal, and Azerbaijan Cup)		League cup (Note: Includes the Taça da Liga)		Continental		Other		Total	
Club	Season	Division	Apps	Goals	Apps	Goals	Apps	Goals	Apps	Goals	Apps	Goals	Apps	Goals
Estoril	2019–20	LigaPro	6	1	0	0	0	0	—		—		6	1
Vilafranquense	2019–20	LigaPro	4	0	0	0	0	0	—		—		4	0
Vilafranquense	2020–21	LigaPro	27	5	2	0	0	0	—		—		29	5
Vilafranquense	Total		31	5	2	0	0	0	—		—		33	5
Qarabağ	2021–22	Azerbaijan Premier League	25	12	5	3	—		14 (Note: Appearances and goals in the UEFA Europa Conference League)	5	—		44	20
Qarabağ	2022–23	Azerbaijan Premier League	16	4	2	0	—		13 (Note: Seven appearances and four goals in the UEFA Champions League, six appearances in the UEFA Europa League)	4	—		31	8
Qarabağ	Total		41	16	7	3	—		27	9	—		75	28
Krasnodar	2022–23	Russian Premier League	7	3	4	0	—		—		—		11	3
Krasnodar	2023–24	Russian Premier League	26	2	7	2	—		—		—		33	4
Krasnodar	Total		33	5	11	2	—		—		—		44	7
Ferencváros	2024–25	Nemzeti Bajnokság I	13	2	0	0	—		13 (Note: Three appearances in the UEFA Champions League and ten appearances and one goal in the UEFA Europa League)	1	—		26	3
Qarabağ	2024–25	Azerbaijan Premier League	0	0	0	0	—		0	0	—		0	0
Career total			124	29	20	5	0	0	40	10	0	0	184	44

== Honours ==
Coritiba

- Campeonato Paranaense: 2017

Qarabağ

- Azerbaijan Premier League: 2021–22
- Azerbaijan Cup: 2021–22

Individual

- Azerbaijan Premier League top scorer: 2021–22
