= Leandro Andrade (footballer) =

Cape Verdean footballer

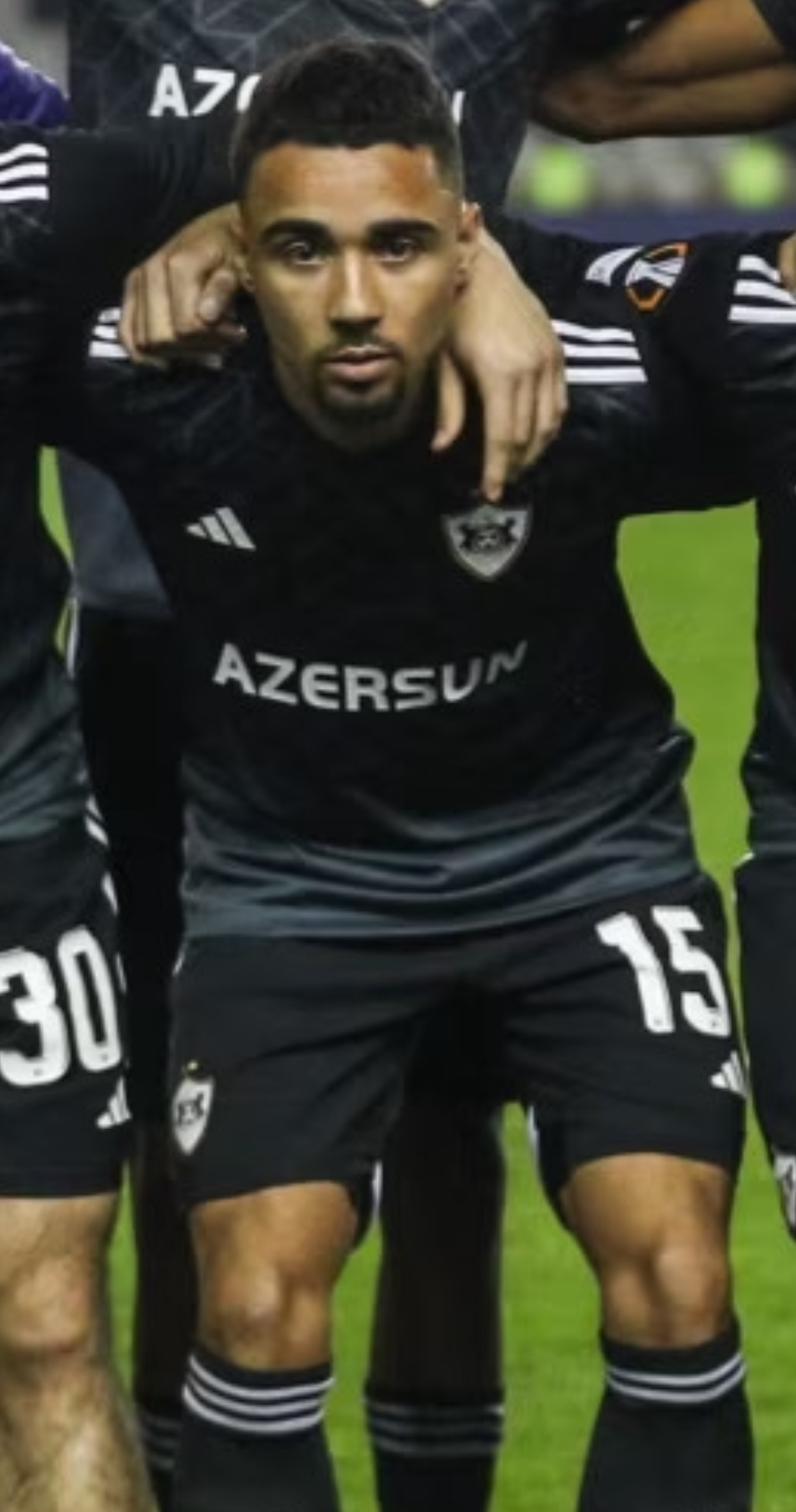
- Andrade with Qarabağ in 2024

Personal information
- Full name: Leandro Livramento Andrade
- Date of birth: 24 September 1999 (age 27)
- Place of birth: Faro, Portugal
- Height: 1.77 m (5 ft 10 in)
- Position: Attacking midfielder

Team information
- Current team: Polissya Zhytomyr
- Number: 11

Youth career
- 2007–2008: Ginásio Tavira
- 2008–2011: Sporting Faro
- 2011–2013: Sporting CP
- 2013–2015: Farense
- 2015–2018: Olhanense

Senior career*
Years	Team	Apps	(Gls)
2018–2019	Olhanense	17	(0)
2019–2020	Fátima	24	(4)
2020–2021	Cherno More	41	(2)
2022–2026	Qarabağ	137	(45)
2026–	Polissya Zhytomyr	7	(1)

International career^{‡}
2022–	Cape Verde	7	(0)
- * Club domestic league appearances and goals as of 17:23, 23 September 2026 (UTC) ‡ National team caps and goals as of 15 April 2025

Leandro Livramento Andrade (born 24 September 1999) is a professional footballer who plays as a midfielder for Ukrainian Premier League club Polissya Zhytomyr. Born in Portugal, he plays for the Cape Verde national team.

== Club career ==
Andrade spent three years developing in Olhanense's youth academy before was promoted to the senior team in 2018. The following year, he joined Fátima before moving to Bulgarian side Cherno More Varna in July 2020.

Andrade made his Bulgarian First League debut on 16 August 2020 as a substitute in a 4–0 away win over Etar Veliko Tarnovo.

On 13 January 2022, Azerbaijan Premier League club Qarabağ announced the signing of Andrade from Cherno More, on a contract until 30 June 2025. On 2 February 2024, Qarabağ extended their contract with Andrade until 30 June 2027.

On 16 September 2025, he scored his first UEFA Champions League goal in a 3–2 away win over Benfica, making him the first Cape Verdean to achieve this feat. A month later, on 22 October, he netted a goal in the opening minute of a 3–1 away defeat to Athletic Bilbao, becoming the first player to score in the first minute of three different European matches, following his goals against BK Häcken in 2023 and FCSB in January 2025.

In June 2026, Andrade joined Ukrainian Premier League club Polissya Zhytomyr in a permanent transfer.

== International career ==
Born in Portugal. He was called up to represent the Cape Verde national team for a set of friendlies in March 2022. He debuted with Cape Verde in a 6–0 friendly win over Liechtenstein on 25 March 2022.

== Career statistics ==
=== Club ===
As of match played 18 September 2026

Appearances and goals by club, season and competition.
Club	Season	League			National cup (Note: Includes Bulgarian Cup, Azerbaijan Cup, Ukrainian Cup)		Continental		Total	
Club	Season	Division	Apps	Goals	Apps	Goals	Apps	Goals	Apps	Goals
Fátima	2019–20	Campeonato de Portugal	24	4	0	0	—		24	4
Cherno More Varna	2020–21	Bulgarian First League	24	0	0	0	–		24	0
Cherno More Varna	2021–22	Bulgarian First League	18	2	2	0	–		20	2
Cherno More Varna	Total		42	2	2	0	–		44	2
Qarabağ	2021–22	Azerbaijan Premier League	9	3	5	1	1 (Note: One appearance in the UEFA Europa Conference League)	0	15	4
Qarabağ	2022–23	Azerbaijan Premier League	26	7	1	0	8 (Note: Three appearances in the UEFA Champions League; three appearances in the UEFA Europa League, and two appearances and one goal in the UEFA Europa Conference League)	1	35	8
Qarabağ	2023–24	Azerbaijan Premier League	37	11	4	0	18 (Note: Four appearances in the UEFA Champions League, and fourteen appearances and four goals in the UEFA Europa League)	4	59	15
Qarabağ	2024–25	Azerbaijan Premier League	34	15	5	0	14 (Note: Six appearances and one goal in the UEFA Champions League, and eight appearances and one goal in the UEFA Europa League)	2	53	17
Qarabağ	2025–26	Azerbaijan Premier League	31	9	4	1	15 (Note: Appearances in UEFA Champions League)	6	50	16
Qarabağ	Total		137	45	19	2	56	13	212	60
Polissya Zhytomyr	2026–27	Ukrainian Premier League	7	1	1	1	2 (Note: Appearances in UEFA Conference League)	0	10	2
Career total			210	52	22	3	58	13	290	68

== Honours ==
Qarabağ

- Azerbaijan Premier League: 2021–22, 2022–23, 2023–24, 2024–25
- Azerbaijan Cup: 2021–22, 2023–24

Individual

- Bulgarian First League Goal of the Week: 2021–22 (Week 16) v. Beroe
- Azerbaijan Premier League Top Score: 2024–25
