= Rahil Mammadov =

Azerbaijani footballer (born 1995)

Personal information
- Full name: Rahil Sarvar oglu Mammadov
- Date of birth: 24 November 1995 (age 30)
- Place of birth: Baku, Azerbaijan
- Height: 1.91 m (6 ft 3 in)
- Position: Centre-back

Team information
- Current team: Turan Tovuz
- Number: 4

Youth career
- Neftchi Baku

Senior career*
Years	Team	Apps	(Gls)
2015–2017	Neftchi Baku	32	(0)
2018	Sabail	13	(0)
2018–2024	Qarabağ	58	(1)
2022	→ Zira (loan)	7	(0)
2024	ŁKS Łódź	16	(0)
2024–2025	Radomiak Radom	12	(0)
2025–2026	Araz-Naxçıvan	20	(0)
2026–	Turan Tovuz	8	(0)

International career^{‡}
2015–2016	Azerbaijan U21	7	(1)
2017	Azerbaijan U23	2	(0)
2018–	Azerbaijan	32	(1)
Medal record
Men's football
Representing Azerbaijan
Islamic Solidarity Games
Winner	2017 Azerbaijan
- * Club domestic league appearances and goals as of 21:48, 13 November 2026 (UTC) ‡ National team caps and goals as of 23:22, 17 November 2026 (UTC)

Rahil Mammadov (Azerbaijani: Rahil Sərvər oğlu Məmmədov; born 24 November 1995) is an Azerbaijani professional footballer who plays as a centre-back for Azerbaijan Premier League club Turan Tovuz and the Azerbaijan national team.

== Club career ==
On 22 December 2017, Mammadov joined Sabail.

On 2 June 2018, Rahil signed a three-year contract with Qarabağ.

On 9 February 2022, Mammadov joined Zira on loan for the remainder of the 2021–22 season.

On 20 January 2024, Polish club ŁKS Łódź announced the signing of Mammadov on an eighteen-month contract. Mammadov made 16 league appearances as ŁKS finished last and was relegated to the I liga. On 3 July 2024, he terminated his contract by mutual consent.

Mammadov remained in Poland for the following season, after signing a two-year deal with Radomiak Radom on 17 July 2024.

On 25 July 2025, he signed a one-year contract with Azerbaijan Premier League side Araz-Naxçıvan.

== International career ==
On 27 March 2018, Mammadov made his senior international debut for Azerbaijan in a game against Macedonia.

== Career statistics ==
=== Club ===
As of match played 6 November 2026

Appearances and goals by club, season and competition
Club	Season	League			National cup (Note: Includes Azerbaijan Cup, Polish Cup)		Europe		Total	
Club	Season	Division	Apps	Goals	Apps	Goals	Apps	Goals	Apps	Goals
Neftçi	2014–15	Azerbaijan Premier League	5	0	2	0	0	0	7	0
Neftçi	2015–16	Azerbaijan Premier League	19	0	4	0	0	0	23	0
Neftçi	2016–17	Azerbaijan Premier League	8	0	2	1	3 (Note: Appearances in UEFA Europa League)	0	13	1
Neftçi	Total		32	0	8	1	3	0	43	1
Sabail	2017–18	Azerbaijan Premier League	13	0	0	0	—		13	0
Qarabağ	2018–19	Azerbaijan Premier League	15	0	4	1	0	0	19	1
Qarabağ	2019–20	Azerbaijan Premier League	8	0	2	0	8 (Note: Six appearances in UEFA Champions League, two appearances in UEFA Europa League)	0	18	0
Qarabağ	2020–21	Azerbaijan Premier League	10	1	2	0	3	0	15	1
Qarabağ	2021–22	Azerbaijan Premier League	3	0	0	0	1 (Note: Appearance in UEFA Champions League)	0	4	0
Qarabağ	2022–23	Azerbaijan Premier League	13	0	2	0	0	0	15	0
Qarabağ	2023–24	Azerbaijan Premier League	9	0	1	0	0	0	10	0
Qarabağ	Total		58	1	11	1	12	0	81	2
Zira (loan)	2021–22	Azerbaijan Premier League	7	0	2	0	—		9	0
ŁKS Łódź	2023–24	Ekstraklasa	16	0	—		—		16	0
Radomiak Radom	2024–25	Ekstraklasa	12	0	2	0	—		14	0
Araz-Naxçıvan	2025–26	Azerbaijan Premier League	20	0	0	0	2 (Note: Appearances in UEFA Conference League)	0	22	0
Turan Tovuz	2026–27	Azerbaijan Premier League	8	0	0	0	—		8	0
Career total			166	1	23	2	17	0	206	3

=== International ===
As of match played 16 November 2026

Appearances and goals by national team and year
National team	Year	Apps	Goals
Azerbaijan
Azerbaijan	2018	7	0
Azerbaijan	2019	2	0
Azerbaijan	2020	1	0
Azerbaijan	2023	6	0
Azerbaijan	2024	6	0
Azerbaijan	2025	2	0
Azerbaijan	2026	8	1
Total		32	1

Scores and results list Azerbaijan's goal tally first, score column indicates score after each Mahmudov goal.

List of international goals scored by Emin Mahmudov
No.	Date	Venue	Opponent	Score	Result	Competition
1	30 March 2026	Sumgayit City Stadium, Sumgait, Azerbaijan	Sierra Leone	1–1	1–1 (9–8 p)	2026 FIFA Series

== Honours ==
Qarabağ

- Azerbaijan Premier League: 2018–19, 2019–20, 2022–23

Azerbaijan U23

- Islamic Solidarity Games: 2017
