= Musa Qurbanlı =

Azerbaijani footballer (born 2002)

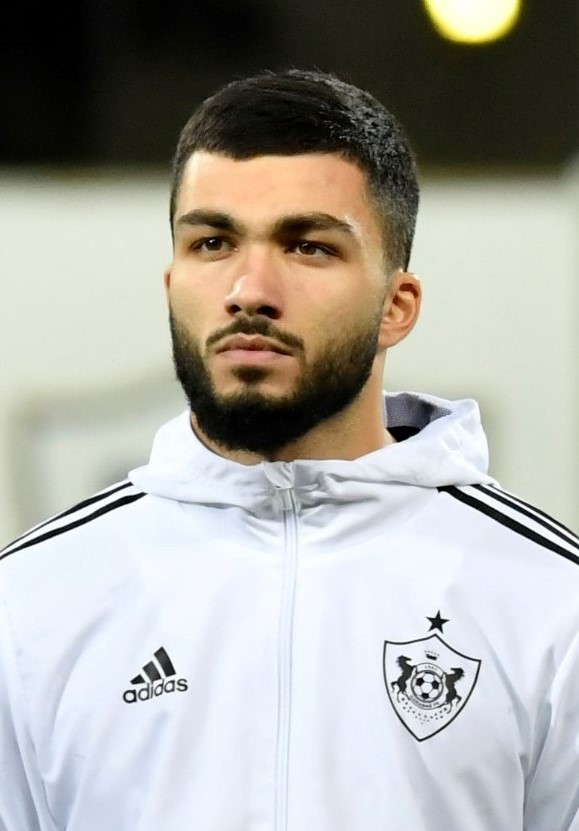

Personal information
- Full name: Musa Qurban oğlu Qurbanlı
- Date of birth: 13 April 2002 (age 24)
- Place of birth: Baku, Azerbaijan
- Height: 1.85 m (6 ft 1 in)
- Position: Striker

Team information
- Current team: Qarabağ
- Number: 22

Youth career
- Neftçi
- 2017–2019: Qarabağ

Senior career*
Years	Team	Apps	(Gls)
2019–2023	Qarabağ	52	(30)
2020–2021	→ Zira (loan)	9	(1)
2023–2024	Djurgårdens IF	16	(2)
2024–	Qarabağ	46	(13)

International career^{‡}
2018	Azerbaijan U16	1	(2)
2017–2018	Azerbaijan U17	3	(1)
2019	Azerbaijan U19	6	(0)
2019–2023	Azerbaijan U21	12	(5)
2020–	Azerbaijan	22	(4)
- * Club domestic league appearances and goals as of 22 June 2026 ‡ National team caps and goals as of 28 March 2026

Musa Qurban oğlu Qurbanlı (born on 13 April 2002) is an Azerbaijani professional footballer who plays as a striker for Azerbaijan Premier League club Qarabağ and the Azerbaijan national team.

== Early life ==
Musa Qurbanlı was born on 13 April 2002 in Baku. His father, Gurban Gurbanov, is manager of Qarabağ. He finished High school 6 named after Tofig Ismayilov.

== Club career ==
Qurbanlı signed a contract with Qarabağ FK in August 2017. He made his debut for the club on 20 December 2019 in an Azerbaijan Cup match against Keşla, which Qarabağ won 3–1. He made his debut in the Azerbaijan Premier League for Qarabağ on 25 September 2020, in a match against Sumgayit.

On 16 December 2022, Qurbanlı signed a new four-year contract with Qarabağ.

On 2 July 2023, it was reported that Qurbanlı has been in Stockholm, Sweden getting a health test, and was very close to Djurgårdens IF. On 5 July 2023, Djurgårdens IF announced that they had signed Qurbanlı to a 3-year contract. On 22 July 2023, Qurbanlı's debut match for Djurgårdens IF ended in a 0-4 IF Elfsborg defeat.

On 14 June 2024, Qurbanlı returned to Qarabağ and signed a three-year contract with his former club.

== International career ==
On 31 May 2019, Qurbanlı was called up to the Azerbaijan U21 team by Milan Obradovic.

He made his official debut for Azerbaijan U21 on 6 June 2020, against Liechtenstein U21 in a EURO-2021 U21 Championship qualification match.

Qurbanlı made his Azerbaijan debut on 11 November 2020 against Slovenia in a friendly match.

== Career statistics ==
=== Club ===
As of on 5 October 2024

Appearances and goals by club, season and competition
Club	Season	League			National cup (Note: Includes Azerbaijan Cup and Svenska Cupen)		Continental		Other		Total	
Club	Season	Division	Apps	Goals	Apps	Goals	Apps	Goals	Apps	Goals	Apps	Goals
Qarabağ	2019–20	Azerbaijan Premier League	0	0	1	0	0 (Note: Zero appearances in the UEFA Champions League and UEFA Europa League)	0	—		1	0
Qarabağ	2020–21	Azerbaijan Premier League	5	1	0	0	1 (Note: Zero appearances in the UEFA Champions League, one appearance in the UEFA Europa League)	0	—		6	1
Qarabağ	2021–22	Azerbaijan Premier League	15	8	2	1	6 (Note: Appearances in the UEFA Europa Conference League)	0	—		23	9
Qarabağ	2022–23	Azerbaijan Premier League	32	21	2	2	4 (Note: Zero appearances in the UEFA Champions League, two appearances in the UEFA Europa League, two appearances in the UEFA Europa Conference League)	0	—		38	23
Qarabağ	Total		43	27	5	3	11	0	0	0	59	30
Zira (loan)	2020–21	Azerbaijan Premier League	9	1	2	1	—				11	2
Djurgården	2023	Allsvenskan	14	2	1	1	2	0	—		17	3
Djurgården	2024	Allsvenskan	2	0	2	0	0	0	–		4	0
Djurgården	Total		16	2	3	1	2	0	0	0	21	3
Qarabağ	2024–25	Azerbaijan Premier League	2	0	0	0	0	0	–		2	0
Career total			68	30	8	5	13	0	0	0	89	35

=== International ===
As of match played 27 March 2026

Year	Apps	Goals
2020	1	0
2022	4	1
2023	5	0
2024	6	2
2025	5	0
2026	1	1
Total	22	4

Scores and results list Azerbaijan's goal tally first, score column indicates score after each Qurbanlı goal.

List of international goals scored by Musa Qurbanlı
No.	Date	Venue	Opponent	Score	Result	Competition
1	20 November 2022	Toše Proeski Arena, Skopje, North Macedonia	North Macedonia	2–1	3–1	Friendly
2	25 March 2024	Tofiq Bahramov Republican Stadium, Baku, Azerbaijan	Bulgaria	1–1	1–1	Friendly
3	7 June 2024	Haladás Sportkomplexum, Szombathely, Hungary	Albania	1–3	1–3	Friendly
4	27 March 2026	Sumgayit City Stadium, Sumgait, Azerbaijan	Saint Lucia	3–0	6–1	2026 FIFA Series

== Personal life ==
Qurbanlı is the son of former Azerbaijani international and current Qarabağ FK manager Gurban Gurbanov and nephew of Musa Gurbanov.

== Honours ==
Qarabağ

- Azerbaijan Premier League: 2019–20, 2021–22, 2022–23
- Azerbaijan Cup: 2021–22
