= Richard Almeida =

Association football player (born 1989)

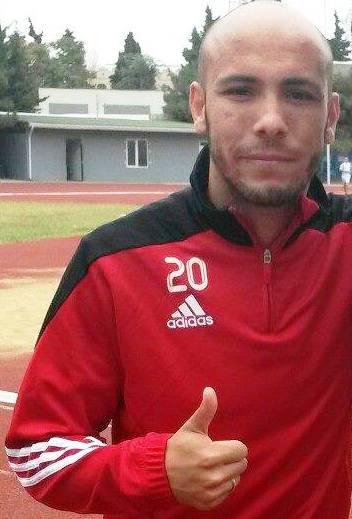
- Richard Almeida in 2014

Personal information
- Full name: Richard Almeida de Oliveira
- Date of birth: 20 March 1989 (age 37)
- Place of birth: São Paulo, Brazil
- Height: 1.77 m (5 ft 10 in)
- Position: Midfielder

Team information
- Current team: XV de Piracicaba

Senior career*
Years	Team	Apps	(Gls)
2009–2012	Santo André	4	(0)
2010–2012	→ Gil Vicente (loan)	58	(6)
2012–2018	Qarabağ	163	(38)
2018–2019	Astana	8	(1)
2019	→ Qarabağ (loan)	28	(6)
2020	Baniyas	7	(1)
2020–2021	Zira	13	(0)
2021–2025	Qarabağ	65	(7)
2025–	Primavera	3	(0)

International career^{‡}
2017–2023	Azerbaijan	31	(3)
- * Club domestic league appearances and goals as of 16 February 2025 ‡ National team caps and goals as of 7 February 2025

Richard Almeida de Oliveira (Azerbaijani: Riçard Almeyda de Oliveyra; born 20 March 1989) is a professional footballer who plays as a midfielder for Campeonato Paulista Série A2 club Primavera. Born in Brazil, he played for the Azerbaijan national team.

== Career ==
In November 2014, Almeida signed a three-year contract extension with Qarabağ, keeping him at the club till the Summer of 2018. On 24 May 2018, Qarabağ announced that Almeida had been released by the club following expiration of his contract.

On 4 July 2018, Almeida signed contract with FC Astana.

On 21 January 2020, Almeida signed contract with Baniyas Club on a season-long deal.

On 26 October 2020, Zira announced the signing of Almeida on a contract until the end of the season.

On 3 August 2021, Qarabağ announced the return of Almeida on a one-year contract. On 3 June 2024, Almeida extended his contract with Qarabağ for an additional year, keeping him at the club until the summer of 2025. On 11 February 2025, Qarabağ announced that the contract with Almeida was mutually terminated.

== Career statistics ==
As of match played 22 December 2024

Appearances and goals by club, season and competition
Club	Season	League			National cup		League cup		Continental		Other		Total	
Club	Season	Division	Apps	Goals	Apps	Goals	Apps	Goals	Apps	Goals	Apps	Goals	Apps	Goals
Santo André	2010	Paulista	1	0	0	0	–		–		–		1	0
Santo André	2010	Série B	3	0	0	0	–		–		–		3	0
Santo André	Total		4	0	0	0	0	0	0	0	0	0	4	0
Gil Vicente (loan)	2010–11	LigaPro	28	6	2	0	8	0	–		–		38	6
Gil Vicente (loan)	2011–12	Primeira Liga	29	0	1	0	7	0	–		–		37	0
Gil Vicente (loan)	Total		57	6	3	0	15	0	0	0	0	0	75	6
Qarabağ	2012–13	Azerbaijan Premier League	30	13	4	1	–		–		–		34	14
Qarabağ	2013–14	Azerbaijan Premier League	28	6	3	0	–		7	1	–		38	6
Qarabağ	2014–15	Azerbaijan Premier League	32	3	5	1	–		12	0	–		48	4
Qarabağ	2015–16	Azerbaijan Premier League	31	9	6	1	–		12	4	–		49	14
Qarabağ	2016–17	Azerbaijan Premier League	20	2	2	1	–		12	2	–		34	5
Qarabağ	2017–18	Azerbaijan Premier League	22	5	1	1	–		12	0	–		35	6
Qarabağ	Total		163	38	21	5	0	0	55	7	0	0	239	49
Astana	2018	Kazakhstan Premier League	8	1	0	0	–		11	0	0	0	19	1
Astana	2019	Kazakhstan Premier League	0	0	0	0	–		0	0	0	0	0	0
Astana	Total		8	1	0	0	0	0	11	0	0	0	19	1
Qarabağ (loan)	2018–19	Azerbaijan Premier League	14	5	2	0	–		0	0	–		16	5
Qarabağ (loan)	2019–20	Azerbaijan Premier League	14	1	2	0	–		13	1	–		29	1
Qarabağ (loan)	Total		28	6	4	0	0	0	13	1	0	0	45	6
Baniyas	2019–20	UAE Pro League	7	1		1	0	0	–		–		7	2
Zira	2020–21	Azerbaijan Premier League	13	0	2	0	–		–		–		15	0
Qarabağ	2021–22	Azerbaijan Premier League	16	0	0	0	–		5	0	–		21	0
Qarabağ	2022–23	Azerbaijan Premier League	26	3	2	0	–		15	0	–		43	3
Qarabağ	2023–24	Azerbaijan Premier League	16	2	3	0	–		3	0	–		22	2
Qarabağ	2024–25	Azerbaijan Premier League	7	2	1	0	–		0	0	–		8	2
Qarabağ	Total		65	7	6	0	0	0	23	0	0	0	94	7
Career total			342	59	35	6	15	0	102	8	0	0	497	71

=== International ===
Statistics accurate as of match played 27 March 2023

Azerbaijan
Year	Apps	Goals
2017	5	0
2018	9	3
2019	8	0
2022	7	0
2023	2	0
Total	31	3

As match played 11 October 2018. Scores and results list Azerbaijan's goal tally first.

#	Date	Venue	Opponent	Score	Result	Competition	Ref
1.	27 March 2018	Mardan Sports Complex, Aksu, Turkey	North Macedonia	1–0	1–1	Friendly	
2.	11 October 2018	Tórsvøllur, Tórshavn, Faroe Islands	Faroe Islands	1–0	3–0	2018–19 UEFA Nations League	
3.	11 October 2018	Tórsvøllur, Tórshavn, Faroe Islands	Faroe Islands	3–0	3–0	2018–19 UEFA Nations League	

== Honours ==
Qarabağ

- Azerbaijan Premier League (8): 2013–14, 2014–15, 2015–16, 2016–17, 2017–18, 2018–19, 2021–22, 2022–23
- Azerbaijan Cup: 2014–15, 2015–16, 2016–17, 2021–22

Astana

- Kazakhstan Premier League: 2018
