= Owusu Kwabena =

Ghanaian footballer

Personal information
- Date of birth: 18 June 1997 (age 29)
- Place of birth: Accra, Ghana
- Height: 1.83 m (6 ft 0 in)
- Position: Forward

Team information
- Current team: Sakaryaspor
- Number: 27

Senior career*
Years	Team	Apps	(Gls)
2016–2017	SC Accra		
2016–2017	→ Toledo (loan)	34	(8)
2017–2020	Leganés	0	(0)
2017–2018	→ Oviedo (loan)	8	(0)
2018	→ Cartagena (loan)	20	(1)
2018–2019	→ Salamanca (loan)	25	(10)
2019–2020	→ Córdoba (loan)	17	(6)
2020–2023	Qarabağ	42	(11)
2021–2022	→ Ankaragücü (loan)	21	(7)
2023–2025	Ferencváros	19	(2)
2025-2026	→ Zalaegerszeg (loan)	15	(2)
2025	→ Ankaragücü (loan)	15	(9)
2025–2026	Maccabi Bnei Reineh	15	(2)
2026–	Sakaryaspor	13	(0)

International career^{‡}
2019	Ghana	3	(0)
- * Club domestic league appearances and goals as of 7 May 2026 ‡ National team caps and goals as of 12:38, 15 July 2019 (UTC)

Owusu Kwabena (born 18 June 1997), simply known as Owusu, is a Ghanaian professional footballer who plays as a forward for Sakaryaspor and the Ghana national team.

== Club career ==
Owusu was born in Accra, and moved to Spain in 2016. After having trials at Racing de Santander and AD Alcorcón B, he joined CD Toledo on loan in August, being initially assigned to the reserves in Tercera División.

Owusu made his senior debut on 31 August 2016, coming on as a second-half substitute and scoring all of his team's goals in a 2–0 home win against UB Conquense, for the season's Copa del Rey. He subsequently became a regular starter for the club, scoring eight goals as his side missed out promotion in the play-offs.

On 23 August 2017, Owusu signed a five-year deal with La Liga side CD Leganés. Eight days later, he was loaned to Real Oviedo in Segunda División, for one year.

Owusu made his professional debut on 9 September 2017, replacing Carlos Hernández in a 1–1 away draw against Sporting de Gijón. After eight league appearances, his loan was cut short the following 3 January, and he joined FC Cartagena on loan just hours later.

On 24 July 2018, Owusu was loaned to Salamanca CF still in the third division, for one year. On 21 August of the following year, he moved to fellow league team Córdoba CF, also in a temporary deal.

On 23 January 2020, Azerbaijani club Qarabağ FK announced the signing of Owusu on a three-and-a-half-year contract.

On 31 January 2023, Owusu signed a two-year contract with Hungarian club Ferencvárosi TC. On 5 May 2023, he won the 2022–23 Nemzeti Bajnokság I with Ferencváros, after Kecskemét lost 1–0 to Honvéd at the Bozsik Aréna on the 30th matchday.

== International career ==
Owusu made his debut for Ghana national team on 15 June 2019 in a friendly against South Africa. He was selected for their 2019 Africa Cup of Nations squad.

== Career statistics ==
=== Club ===
As of 31 January 2023

Appearances and goals by club, season and competition
Club	Season	League			Cup		Continental		Other		Total	
Club	Season	Division	Apps	Goals	Apps	Goals	Apps	Goals	Apps	Goals	Apps	Goals
Toledo (loan)	2016–17	Segunda División B	34	8	4	2	—		—		38	10
Oviedo (loan)	2017–18	Segunda División	8	0	0	0	—		—		8	0
Cartagena (loan)	2017–18	Segunda División B	20	1	0	0	—		—		20	1
Salamanca (loan)	2018–19	Segunda División B	25	10	0	0	—		—		25	10
Córdoba CF (loan)	2019–20	Segunda División B	17	6	1	0	—		—		23	6
Qarabağ	2019–20	Azerbaijan Premier League	5	0	0	0	0	0	—		5	0
Qarabağ	2020–21	Azerbaijan Premier League	26	7	4	1	9	1	—		39	9
Qarabağ	2022–23	Azerbaijan Premier League	18	5	2	0	14	5	—		34	10
Qarabağ	Total		49	12	6	1	23	6	—		78	19
Ankaragücü (loan)	2021–22	TFF First League	21	7	2	3	—		—		23	10
Ferencváros	2022–23	Nemzeti Bajnokság I	0	0	0	0	0	0	—		0	0
Career total			174	44	13	6	23	6	0	0	210	56

=== International ===
As of matches played on 15 July 2019

Appearances and goals by national team and year
National team	Year	Apps	Goals
Ghana	2019	3	0
Total		3	0

== Honours ==
Qarabağ

- Azerbaijan Premier League: 2019–20, 2022–23

Ankaragücü

- TFF First League: 2021–22

Ferencváros

- Nemzeti Bajnokság I: 2022–23
