= Gaspar Panadero =

Spanish footballer

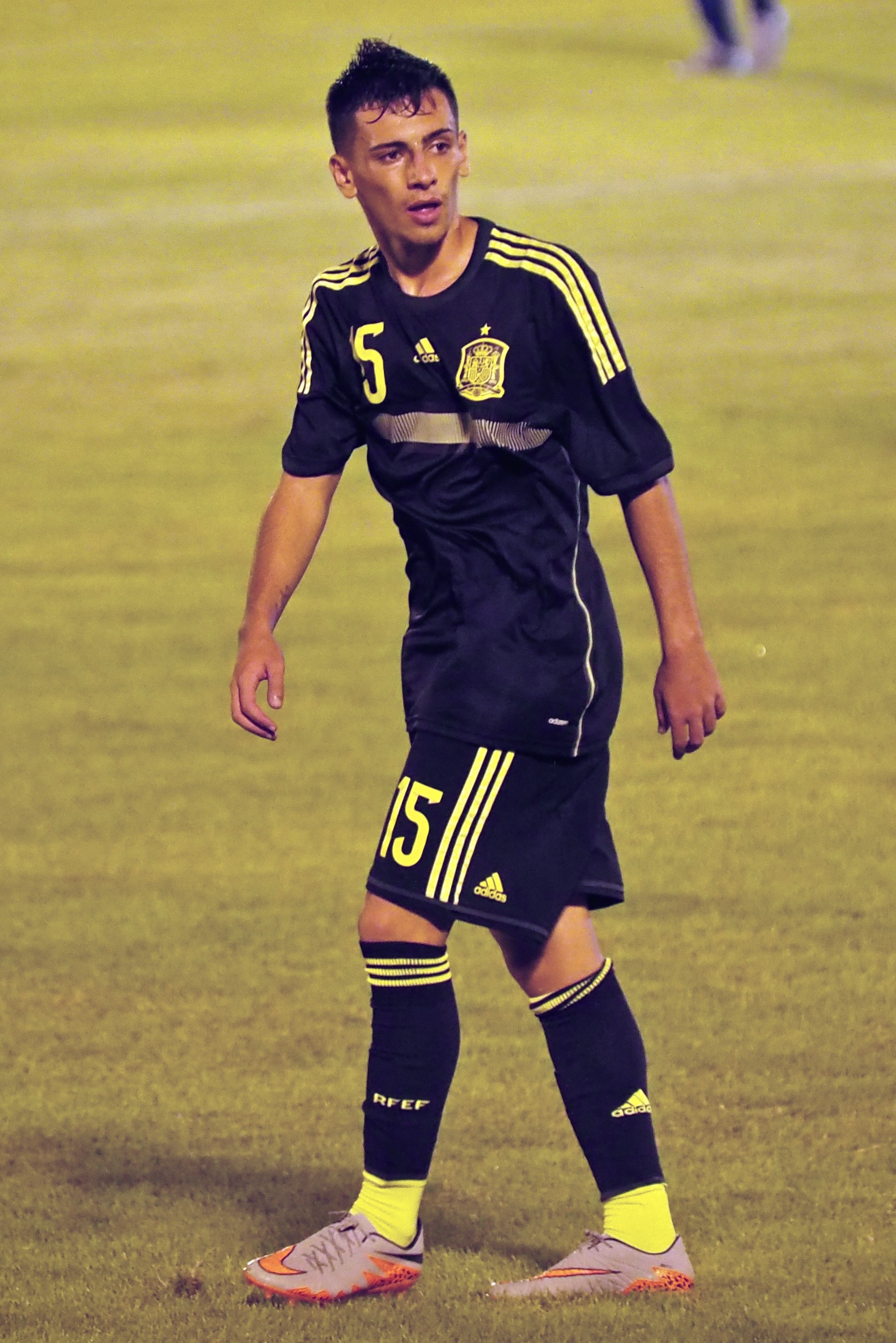

Personal information
- Full name: Gaspar Panadero Zamora
- Date of birth: 9 December 1997 (age 28)
- Place of birth: Tarazona de la Mancha, Spain
- Height: 1.70 m (5 ft 7 in)
- Position: Winger

Team information
- Current team: Huracán de Balazote

Youth career
- Albacete
- 2012–2014: Almería

Senior career*
| Years | Team | Apps | (Gls) |
| 2014–2017 | Almería B | 84 | (3) |
| 2014–2020 | Almería | 46 | (2) |
| 2020 | Al Wahda | 5 | (1) |
| 2020–2021 | Cádiz | 0 | (0) |
| 2020–2021 | → Ponferradina (loan) | 24 | (1) |
| 2021–2023 | Qarabağ | 4 | (0) |
| 2022 | → AEK Larnaca (loan) | 4 | (0) |
| 2024 | Linares Deportivo | 2 | (0) |
| 2025– | Huracán de Balazote | 2 | (1) |

International career^{‡}
| 2015 | Spain U18 | 2 | (0) |
| 2015–2016 | Spain U19 | 3 | (0) |
- * Club domestic league appearances and goals as of 9 November 2025 ‡ National team caps and goals as of 05:38, 9 June 2021 (UTC)

Gaspar Panadero Zamora (born 9 December 1997), sometimes known simply as Gaspar, is a Spanish footballer who plays as a winger for Tercera Federación club Huracán de Balazote.

== Club career ==
=== Almería ===
Born in Tarazona de la Mancha, Albacete, Castilla-La Mancha, Panadero joined UD Almería's youth setup in 2012, aged 14, after starting it out at Albacete Balompié. He made his senior debut with the B-team on 10 May 2014, coming on as a second half substitute for Kiu in a 2–3 Segunda División B home loss against UD Melilla.

On 12 September 2014 Panadero made his first-team – and La Liga – debut, playing the last six minutes in a 1–1 home draw against Córdoba CF at the age of 16 years and 277 days, thus becoming the Andalusians' youngest player to debut for the club (also in the top division), and the 20th overall. However, he only appeared with the B-side for the remainder of the campaign.

Panadero scored his first senior goal on 10 January 2016, netting the last in a 3–1 home win against FC Jumilla. On 27 January of the following year, in only his second match with the main squad, he scored the last in a 3–0 home success over Real Oviedo, after replacing Javi Álamo in the dying minutes.

Ahead of the 2017–18 season, Panadero was definitely promoted to the main squad, and extended his contract until 2021 on 9 August 2017. The following April, he suffered a serious knee injury, being sidelined for seven months.

=== Al Wahda ===
On 26 January 2020, Panadero moved abroad for the first time in his career, joining UAE Pro League side Al Wahda FC.

=== Cádiz ===
On 2 August 2020, Panadero signed a three-year contract with newly-promoted La Liga club Cádiz CF, but was loaned to SD Ponferradina in the second division on 5 October. Upon returning, he terminated his contract on 3 August 2021.

=== Qarabağ ===
On 4 August 2021, Panadero signed a one-year deal with Qarabağ FK in Azerbaijan.

== International career ==
On 17 September 2014 Panadero was called up to Spain under-19, along with teammate Antonio Marín. He made his debut for the side on 27 January of the following year, starting and assisting Borja Mayoral in a 1–0 home win against Qatar.
