= Elvin Cafarguliyev =

Azerbaijani footballer (born 2000)

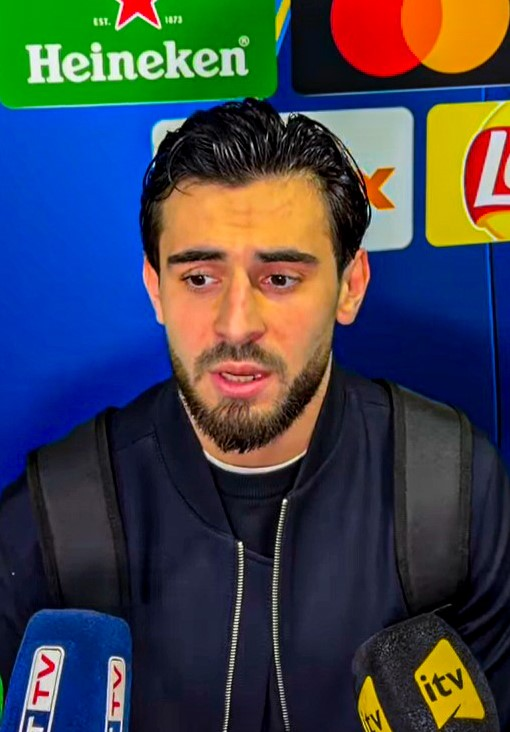
- Cafarguliyev with Qarabağ in 2026

Personal information
- Full name: Elvin Eldar oğlu Cəfərquliyev
- Date of birth: 26 October 2000 (age 26)
- Place of birth: Baku, Azerbaijan
- Height: 1.70 m (5 ft 7 in)
- Position: Left-back

Team information
- Current team: Qarabağ
- Number: 44

Youth career
- Keşla

Senior career*
Years	Team	Apps	(Gls)
2018–	Qarabağ	141	(8)
2019–2020	→ Sumgayit (loan)	17	(2)

International career^{‡}
2018–2019	Azerbaijan U19	7	(0)
2019–2022	Azerbaijan U21	13	(0)
2021–	Azerbaijan	33	(1)
- * Club domestic league appearances and goals as of 22 June 2026 ‡ National team caps and goals as of 28 March 2026

Elvin Cafarguliyev (also spelled Jafarguliyev; Azerbaijani: Elvin Eldar oğlu Cəfərquliyev, born 26 October 2000) is an Azerbaijani professional footballer who plays as a defender for Azerbaijan Premier League club Qarabağ and the Azerbaijan national team.

== Club career ==
On 10 December 2017, Cafarguliyev made his Azerbaijan Cup debut for Keşla against Kapaz.

He signed a contract with Qarabağ in 2018. In summer 2019, Sumgayit announced the signing of Cafarguliyev on a one-year loan. On 17 August 2019, he made his debut in the Azerbaijan Premier League for Sumgayit against Gabala.

On 11 September 2020, he made his first appearance for Qarabağ in a league match against Keşla.

On 18 August 2020, Cafarguliyev made his European debut against Sileks in the UEFA Champions League first qualifying round.

== International career ==
He made his debut for the Azerbaijan national team on 30 March 2021 in a World Cup qualifier against Serbia.

== Career statistics ==
=== International ===
As of match played 10 June 2025

Appearances and goals by national team and year
National team	Year	Apps	Goals
Azerbaijan	2021	4	0
Azerbaijan	2022	4	1
Azerbaijan	2023	9	0
Azerbaijan	2024	9	0
Azerbaijan	2025	3	0
Total		29	1

Scores and results list Azerbaijan's goal tally first, score column indicates score after each Cafarguliyev goal.

List of international goals scored by Elvin Cafarguliyev
No.	Date	Venue	Cap	Opponent	Score	Result	Competition
1	20 November 2022	Toše Proeski Arena, Skopje, North Macedonia	8	North Macedonia	1–1	3–1	Friendly

== Honours ==
Keşla

- Azerbaijan Cup: 2017–18

Qarabağ

- Azerbaijan Premier League: 2021–22, 2022–23, 2023–24, 2024–25
- Azerbaijan Cup: 2021–22, 2023–24

Azerbaijan

- FIFA Series: 2026

Individual

- FIFA Series Player of the Tournament: 2026
