= Luka Gugeshashvili =

Georgian footballer (born 1999)

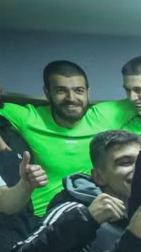
- Luka with Qarabağ in 2024

Personal information
- Date of birth: 29 April 1999 (age 27)
- Place of birth: Tbilisi, Georgia
- Height: 1.96 m (6 ft 5 in)
- Position: Goalkeeper

Team information
- Current team: Göztepe (on loan from PAOK)
- Number: 25

Youth career
- 2010–2015: Dinamo Tbilisi

Senior career*
Years	Team	Apps	(Gls)
2015–2016	Dinamo Tbilisi	0	(0)
2016–2022	Jagiellonia Białystok	0	(0)
2017–2018	→ Podlasie (loan)	16	(0)
2018–2019	→ Dila (loan)	34	(0)
2019–2020	→ Granada (loan)	5	(0)
2020–2021	→ Dila (loan)	51	(0)
2022	→ Qarabağ (loan)	4	(0)
2022–2024	Qarabağ	33	(0)
2024–2025	Panserraikos	33	(0)
2025–	PAOK	1	(0)
2026	→ Atromitos (loan)	9	(0)
2026–	→ Göztepe (loan)	4	(0)

International career^{‡}
2015–2016	Georgia U17	7	(0)
2015–2017	Georgia U19	6	(0)
2018–2020	Georgia U21	14	(0)
2023–	Georgia	3	(0)
- * Club domestic league appearances and goals as of 18:56, 7 September 2026 (UTC) ‡ National team caps and goals as of 5 June 2026

Luka Gugeshashvili (Order of Honor) (Georgian: ლუკა გუგეშაშვილი; born 29 April 1999) is a Georgian professional footballer who plays as a goalkeeper for Turkish Süper Lig club Göztepe, on loan from Greek side PAOK, and the Georgia national team.

Gugeshashvili is a three-time winner of the Azerbaijan Premier League and two-time winner of the Azerbaijan Cup. He has played in Georgia's all youth teams.

== Career ==
Gugeshashvili was six years old when he entered the Merani football school. He played as a full-back for one year before becoming a goalkeeper. After joining Dinamo Tbilisi he was regularly called up to national youth teams. While still eligible for U17s, Gugeshashvili took part in several matches held by the under-19 team.

Before the second half of the 2015–16 season, Gugeshashvili signed for Polish top–flight side Jagiellonia Białystok. In 2017, he was sent on loan to Podlasie Biała Podlaska in the Polish fourth tier. In 2018, he was sent on loan to Georgian top flight club Dila Gori. In 2019, Gugeshashvili was sent on loan to the reserves of Recreativo Granada in the Spanish La Liga. In 2020, he returned on loan to Georgian team Dila Gori.

Before the second half of the 2021–22 season, Gugeshashvili was sent on loan to Qarabağ in Azerbaijan. On 1 February 2022, he debuted for Qarabağ during a 1–0 win over Keşla in Azerbaijan Cup.

Gugeshashvili joined the national team for a World Cup qualifier against Sweden in November 2021. On 25 March 2023, he made a debut for the team as a substitute in a 6–1 win over Mongolia. Gugeshashvili was a squad member of the Crusaders taking part in Euro 2024.

On 9 July 2024, Gugeshashvili signed for Super League Greece club Panserraikos on a two-year contract.

In March 2025, PAOK announced that it signed Gugeshashvili until 30 June 2028 with the deal due to take effect from 1 July 2025.

== Honours ==
Qarabağ

- Azerbaijan Premier League: 2021–22, 2022–23, 2023–24
- Azerbaijan Cup: 2021–22, 2023–24
