= Nihad Quliyev =

Azerbaijani footballer (born 2001)

Personal information
- Full name: Nihad Vüqar oğlu Quliyev
- Date of birth: 19 July 2001 (age 25)
- Place of birth: Shamakhi, Azerbaijan
- Height: 1.83 m (6 ft 0 in)
- Position: Centre-back

Team information
- Current team: Shafa Baku
- Number: 83

Youth career
- Qarabağ

Senior career*
Years	Team	Apps	(Gls)
2022–2024	Qarabağ	4	(0)
2022–2023	→ Shamakhi (loan)	31	(2)
2024–2025	Sabail	30	(0)
2025–	Shafa Baku	12	(0)

International career^{‡}
2019	Azerbaijan U19	2	(0)
2022	Azerbaijan U21	4	(0)
- * Club domestic league appearances and goals as of 25 December 2025 ‡ National team caps and goals as of 27 September 2024

Nihad Vüqar oğlu Quliyev (born 19 July 2001) is an Azerbaijani footballer who plays as a defender for Shafa Baku in the Azerbaijan First League.

== Club career ==
On 15 May 2022, Quliyev made his debut in the Azerbaijan Premier League for Qarabağ against Sabail.

In the 2024–25 season, Sabail signed a one-year contract with Quliyev.
