= 2021–22 Sabah FC season =

Sabah
2021–22 season
- Manager: Ramin Guliyev (until 21 October); Ilkin Huseynov (Interim) (21-30 October); Murad Musayev (from 30 October)
- Stadium: Bank Respublika Arena
- Premier League: 5th
- Azerbaijan Cup: Quarterfinal vs Neftçi
- Top goalscorer: League: Joy-Lance Mickels (11); All: Joy-Lance Mickels (14)

The Sabah FC 2021–22 season was Sabah's fourth Azerbaijan Premier League season, and their fifth season in existence.

== Season events ==
On 27 May, Sabah announced the signing of Elvin Camalov to a two-year contract from Zira.

On 14 June, Sabah announced the signing of Salahat Aghayev to a one-year contract from Neftçi.

On 8 July, Sabah announced the year-long loan signing of Juan Cámara from Jagiellonia Białystok.

On 10 July, Sabah announced the signing of Joy-Lance Mickels from MVV Maastricht to a two-year contract.

On 2 August, Sabah announced the signing of Ildar Alekperov from Neftekhimik Nizhnekamsk to a three-year contract.

On 4 August, Sabah announced the signing of Mikheil Ergemlidze from Dinamo Tbilisi to a three-year contract.

On 8 August, Sabah announced the signing of Cristian Ceballos from Qatar to a three-year contract.

On 17 August, Sabah announced the signing of Špiro Peričić from Maribor on a one-year contract.

On 14 September, Sabah announced the signing of Petar Škuletić from Montpellier on a two-year contract. Six weeks later, on 27 October, Škuletić left Sabah by mutual consent.

On 21 October, Head Coach Ramin Guliyev resigned from his role with the club bottom of the league. On 30 October, former Krasnodar Head Coach Murad Musayev was appointed as Head Coach on a 2-year contract.

On 16 December, Sabah announced that Saša Stamenković had left the club after his contract was ended by mutual consent.

On 19 January, Sabah announced the signing of Alyaksandr Nyachayew from Rukh Brest.

On 3 February, Sabah announced the signing of Christian from Académica de Coimbra to a 18-month contract. The following day, 4 February, Sabah announced the signing of Higor Gabriel who'd previously played for Fluminense.

On 18 February, Sabah announced the signing of Bojan Letić on a contract until the end of the season.

On 21 March. Sabah announced the signing of Lucas Rangel on loan until the end of the season from Vorskla Poltava.

On 29 March. Sabah announced the signing of Oleksiy Kashchuk on loan until the end of the season from Shakhtar Donetsk.

== Squad ==
As of match played 21 May 2022

No.	Name	Nationality	Position	Date of birth (age)	Signed from	Signed in	Contract ends	Apps.	Goals
Goalkeepers
1	Salahat Aghayev	(Azerbaijan)	GK	4 January 1991 (age 35)	Neftçi	2021	2022	20	0
32	Rustam Samigullin	(Azerbaijan)	GK	23 December 2002 (age 23)	Academy	2020		1	0
94	Yusif Imanov	(Azerbaijan)	GK	27 September 2002 (age 24)	Academy	2020		8	0
97	Alyaksandr Nyachayew	(Belarus)	GK	21 April 1994 (age 32)	Rukh Brest	2022	2023	1	0
Defenders
2	Amin Seydiyev	(Azerbaijan)	DF	15 November 1998 (age 27)	Gabala	2020	2023	53	2
3	Zurab Ochihava	(Ukraine)	DF	18 May 1995 (age 31)	FCI Levadia	2021	2022	31	2
7	Bojan Letić	(Bosnia and Herzegovina)	DF	21 December 1992 (age 33)	Unattached	2022	2022	11	1
14	Slavik Alkhasov	(Azerbaijan)	DF	6 February 1993 (age 33)	Qarabag	2020	2022 (+1)	37	2
34	Bakhtiyar Hasanalizade	(Azerbaijan)	DF	29 December 1992 (age 33)	Zira	2020	2022	36	1
55	Špiro Peričić	(Croatia)	DF	8 October 1993 (age 33)	Maribor	2021	2022	16	1
99	Higor Gabriel	(Brazil)	DF	28 April 1999 (age 27)	Unattached	2022	2024	2	0
Midfielders
4	Elvin Camalov	(Azerbaijan)	MF	4 February 1995 (age 31)	Zira	2021	2023	29	0
6	Idris Ingilabli	(Azerbaijan)	MF	6 October 2001 (age 25)	Gabala	2020	2024	0	0
8	Shakir Seyidov	(Azerbaijan)	MF	31 December 2000 (age 25)	Academy	2018	2023	49	2
10	Aleksey Isayev	(Azerbaijan)	MF	9 November 1995 (age 31)	Sumgayit	2020	2023	50	7
11	Cristian Ceballos	(Spain)	MF	3 December 1992 (age 33)	Qatar	2021	2024	10	2
15	Christian	(Brazil)	MF	14 June 1989 (age 37)	Académica de Coimbra	2022	2023	13	1
17	Juan Cámara	(Spain)	MF	13 February 1994 (age 32)	loan from Jagiellonia Białystok	2021	2022	22	5
18	Oleksiy Kashchuk	(Ukraine)	MF	29 June 2000 (age 26)	on loan from Shakhtar Donetsk	2022	2022	8	2
20	Joy-Lance Mickels	(Germany)	MF	29 March 1994 (age 32)	MVV Maastricht	2021	2023	28	14
21	Ildar Alekperov	(Azerbaijan)	MF	7 April 2001 (age 25)	Neftekhimik Nizhnekamsk	2021	2024	8	0
29	Jeyhun Nuriyev	(Azerbaijan)	MF	30 March 2001 (age 25)	Academy	2020		23	2
66	Abdulla Khaybulayev	(Azerbaijan)	MF	19 August 2001 (age 25)	Academy	2021		14	0
77	Veysal Rzayev	(Azerbaijan)	MF	24 October 2002 (age 24)	Academy	2020		17	0
	Samir Maharramli	(Azerbaijan)	MF	17 July 2002 (age 24)	Gabala	2020	2023	0	0
Forwards
9	Julio Rodríguez	(Paraguay)	FW	5 December 1990 (age 35)	Zira	2020	2022	48	6
19	Kamran Guliyev	(Azerbaijan)	FW	11 March 2000 (age 26)	Jonava	2021		5	1
24	Mikheil Ergemlidze	(Georgia (country))	FW	28 September 1999 (age 27)	Dinamo Tbilisi	2021	2024	12	0
26	Tiemoko Fofana	(Ivory Coast)	FW	22 October 1999 (age 27)	Ilves	2021		35	5
33	Jamal Jafarov	(Azerbaijan)	FW	25 February 2002 (age 24)	Anzhi Makhachkala	2020	2025	17	0
73	Lucas Rangel	(Brazil)	FW	29 December 1994 (age 31)	on loan from Vorskla Poltava	2022	2022	8	2
Out on loan
5	Arsen Agjabayov	(Azerbaijan)	DF	11 September 2000 (age 26)	Academy	2019		5	0
	Nijat Mehbaliyev	(Azerbaijan)	GK	11 September 2000 (age 26)	Qarabağ	2020	2023	2	0
Left during the season
7	Joshgun Diniyev	(Azerbaijan)	MF	13 September 1995 (age 31)	Qarabağ	2019		54	2
7	Petar Škuletić	(Serbia)	FW	29 June 1990 (age 36)	Montpellier	2021	2023	4	0
16	Saša Stamenković	(Serbia)	GK	5 January 1985 (age 41)	Unattached	2018	2022	67	0

=== Out on loan ===
Note: Flags indicate national team as defined under FIFA eligibility rules; some limited exceptions apply. Players may hold more than one non-FIFA nationality.

No.	Pos.	Nation	Player
5	DF	AZE	Arsen Agjabayov (at Sumgayit)
—	GK	AZE	Nijat Mehbaliyev (at Gabala)

== Transfers ==
=== In ===
Date	Position	Nationality	Name	From	Fee	Ref.
1 June 2021	MF	(Azerbaijan)	Elvin Camalov	Zira	Undisclosed	
14 June 2021	GK	(Azerbaijan)	Salahat Aghayev	Neftçi	Undisclosed	
10 July 2021	MF	(Germany)	Joy-Lance Mickels	MVV Maastricht	Undisclosed	
2 August 2021	MF	(Azerbaijan)	Ildar Alekperov	Neftekhimik Nizhnekamsk	Undisclosed	
4 August 2021	MF	(Georgia (country))	Mikheil Ergemlidze	Dinamo Tbilisi	Undisclosed	
8 August 2021	MF	(Spain)	Cristian Ceballos	Qatar	Undisclosed	
17 August 2021	DF	(Croatia)	Špiro Peričić	Maribor	Undisclosed	
14 September 2021	FW	(Serbia)	Petar Škuletić	Montpellier	Undisclosed	
19 January 2022	GK	(Belarus)	Alyaksandr Nyachayew	Rukh Brest	Undisclosed	
3 February 2022	MF	(Brazil)	Christian	Académica de Coimbra	Undisclosed	
4 February 2022	DF	(Brazil)	Higor Gabriel	Unattached	Free	
18 February 2022	DF	(Bosnia and Herzegovina)	Bojan Letić	Unattached	Free	

=== Loans in ===
Date from	Position	Nationality	Name	From	Date to	Ref.
8 July 2021	MF	(Spain)	Juan Cámara	Jagiellonia Białystok	End of season	
21 March 2022	FW	(Brazil)	Lucas Rangel	Vorskla Poltava	End of season	
29 March 2022	MF	(Ukraine)	Oleksiy Kashchuk	Shakhtar Donetsk	End of season	

=== Out ===
Date	Position	Nationality	Name	To	Fee	Ref.
15 June 2021	MF	(Azerbaijan)	Eltun Turabov	Sumgayit	Undisclosed	
3 August 2021	MF	(Azerbaijan)	Ozan Kökçü	Telstar	Undisclosed	

=== Loans out ===
Date from	Position	Nationality	Name	To	Date to	Ref.
7 July 2021	GK	(Azerbaijan)	Nijat Mehbaliyev	Gabala	End of season	
3 January 2022	DF	(Azerbaijan)	Arsen Agjabayov	Sumgayit	End of season	

=== Released ===
Date	Position	Nationality	Name	Joined	Date	Ref
1 June 2021	MF	(Azerbaijan)	Elshan Abdullayev	Sabail		
4 June 2021	DF	(Azerbaijan)	Ruslan Abyshov	Zira	26 June 2021	
4 June 2021	DF	(Serbia)	Filip Ivanović	Teuta Durrës		
1 July 2021	FW	(Azerbaijan)	Ramil Sheydayev	Qarabağ	1 July 2021	
29 August 2021	MF	(Azerbaijan)	Joshgun Diniyev	Zira	30 August 2021	
27 October 2021	FW	(Serbia)	Petar Škuletić	TSC Bačka Topola		
16 December 2021	GK	(Serbia)	Saša Stamenković	Aktobe		
23 May 2022	DF	(Azerbaijan)	Slavik Alkhasov	Zira	12 June 2022	
24 May 2022	DF	(Croatia)	Špiro Peričić	NK Dugopolje		
25 May 2022	FW	(Paraguay)	Julio Rodríguez	Guillermo Brown		
31 May 2022	MF	(Azerbaijan)	Nazim Hasanzada	Turan Tovuz		
31 May 2022	MF	(Azerbaijan)	Eltun Turabov	Turan Tovuz		

== Friendlies ==
9 July 2021	Sabah	0 – 0	Zira	Masazır
AZT (UTC+4)		Report		Stadium: Bank Respublika Arena

13 July 2021	Sabah	1 – 2	Keşla	Masazır
19:00 AZT (UTC+4)	Alkhasov 83' (pen.)	Report	Hajiyev 39' (pen.); Salahli 74'	Stadium: Bank Respublika Arena

20 July 2021	Shukura (Georgia (country))	0 – 1	(Azerbaijan) Sabah	Tbilisi, Georgia
17:45 AZT (UTC+4)		Report	Rodríguez 67'	Stadium: Zestaponi Training Ground

23 July 2021	Samgurali Tsqaltubo (Georgia (country))	1 – 0	(Azerbaijan) Sabah	Tbilisi, Georgia
19:00 AZT (UTC+4)	Goal	Report		Stadium: Zestaponi Training Ground

26 July 2021	Telavi (Georgia (country))	3 – 1	(Azerbaijan) Sabah	Tbilisi, Georgia
19:00 AZT (UTC+4)	Goal	Report	A.Khaybulayev	Stadium: Zestaponi Training Ground

28 July 2021	Saburtalo Tbilisi (Georgia (country))	1 – 1	(Azerbaijan) Sabah	Tbilisi, Georgia
19:00 AZT (UTC+4)	A.Shulaya 41' (pen.)	Report	Mickels (penalty missed) 68'; Rzayev 74'	Stadium: Zestaponi Training Ground

7 August 2021	Sabah	2 – 4	Gabala	Masazır
19:00 AZT (UTC+4)	Mickels; Fofana	Report	Musayev; Muradov; Alimi	Stadium: Bank Respublika Arena

4 September 2021	Sabah	1 – 0	Sumgayit	Masazır
AZT (UTC+4)	Ceballos (pen.)	Report		Stadium: Bank Respublika Arena

15 January 2022	Sabah (Azerbaijan)	1 – 1	(Hungary) Paksi	Antalya, Turkey
AZT (UTC+4)	Rodríguez	Report	Goal	Stadium: Titatic Deluxe Football Center

20 January 2022	Sabah (Azerbaijan)	1 – 1	(Ukraine) Zorya Luhansk	Antalya, Turkey
18:00 AZT (UTC+4)	K.Quliyev	Report	Goal	Stadium: Titatic Deluxe Football Center

25 January 2022	Sabah (Azerbaijan)	1 – 1	(Serbia) Mladost Lučani	Antalya, Turkey
AZT (UTC+4)	Mickels 53'	Report	Goal

== Competitions ==
=== Overview ===
Competition	First match	Last match	Starting round	Final position	Record							
Competition	First match	Last match	Starting round	Final position	Pld	W	D	L	GF	GA	GD	Win %
Premier League	14 August 2021	21 May 2022	Matchday 1	5th	28	12	5	11	42	34	+8	42.86
Azerbaijan Cup	11 December 2021	12 February 2022	First Round	Quarterfinal	3	1	1	1	5	4	+1	33.33
Total					31	13	6	12	47	38	+9	41.94

Last updated: 21 May 2022
Source: Competitions

=== Premier League ===
==== Results summary ====
Overall								Home						Away					
Pld	W	D	L	GF	GA	GD	Pts	W	D	L	GF	GA	GD	W	D	L	GF	GA	GD
28	12	5	11	39	32	+7	41	6	2	5	21	14	+7	6	3	6	18	18	0

Last updated: 21 May 2022.
Source: See Results

==== Results by round ====
Round	1	2	3	4	5	6	7	8	9	10	11	12	13	14	15	16	17	18	19	20	21	22	23	24	25	26	27	28
Ground	H	A	H	A	H	A	H	H	A	H	A	H	A	A	H	A	H	A	H	H	A	H	A	H	A	A	H	A
Result	L	L	L	D	L	L	L	W	W	D	W	W	L	W	W	L	L	W	L	W	W	W	L	W	D	W	D	D
Position	7	8	8	7	7	8	8	8	8	8	5	5	5	5	5	5	5	5	5	5	5	5	5	4	5	5	5	5

Updated to match(es) played on 21 May 2022. Source: See Results
A = Away; H = Home; W = Win; D = Draw; L = Loss

==== Results ====
14 August 2021 1	Sabah	0 – 1	Sabail	Masazır
18:30 AZT (UTC+4)	S.Seyidov (yellow card) 45+2'; Seydiyev (yellow card) 45+2'; Mickels (yellow card) 75' (yellow-red card) 90+2'	Report	Goxha 30' (yellow card) 36'	Stadium: Bank Respublika Arena; Referee: Raad Ahmədov

21 August 2021 2	Sumgayit	2 – 0	Sabah	Sumgait
20:00 AZT (UTC+4)	Ghorbani 32'; Mutallimov 78'	Report	Hasanalizade (yellow card) 60'; Seydiyev (yellow card) 62'	Stadium: Kapital Bank Arena; Referee: Aliyar Agayev

11 September 2021 3	Sabah	0 – 2	Gabala	Masazır
19:00 AZT (UTC+4)	Ceballos (yellow card) 23'; Alekperov (yellow card) 26'; Hasanalizade (yellow card) 56'; Camalov (yellow card) 76'	Report	Musayev (yellow card) 27'; Akakpo 53'; N.Mehbaliyev (yellow card) 90+1'; Isgandarov 90+3'	Stadium: Bank Respublika Arena; Referee: Rauf Jabbarov

18 September 2021 4	Zira	1 – 1	Sabah	Zirə
19:15 AZT (UTC+4)	Huseynov (yellow card) 22'; Stoilov (yellow card) 25'; Hamdaoui 49'; Khalilzade (yellow card) 60'	Report	Ochihava (yellow card) 12'; M.Ergemlidze (yellow card) 44'; Fofana (yellow card) 76'; Peričić 83'	Stadium: Zira Olympic Sport Complex Stadium; Referee: Ingilab Mammadov

26 September 2021 5	Sabah	1 – 2	Neftçi	Masazır
17:00 AZT (UTC+4)	Isayev 81'; Seydiyev (yellow card) 90+5'	Report	Ramon 21'; Kané 77' (yellow card) 77'; Lawal (yellow card) 87'; Mammadov (yellow card) 90+2'	Stadium: Bank Respublika Arena; Referee: Aliyar Ağayev

2 October 2021 6	Keşla	2 – 0	Sabah	Baku
17:00 AZT (UTC+4)	Gigauri 3'; Tounkara (yellow card) 45+3'; Namașco (yellow card) 90+1'; Felipe Santos (yellow card) 90+3' (goal) 90+5'	Report	J.Jafarov (yellow card) 58'; Ceballos (yellow card) 86'; Seydiyev (yellow card) 88'; Rodríguez (yellow card) 90+3'	Stadium: ASK Arena; Referee: Raad Ahmadov

17 October 2021 7	Sabah	1 – 2	Qarabağ	Masazır
18:45 AZT (UTC+4)	A.Xaybulayev (yellow card) 15'; Rodríguez (red card) 27'; Isayev 65'; Rzayev (yellow card) 90+1'	Report	A.Huseynov (yellow card) 12'; Medina (yellow card) 25'; Mahammadaliyev (yellow card) 27'; Ozobić 43'; Zoubir 51'; Vešović (yellow card) 66'	Stadium: Bank Respublika Arena; Referee: Kamal Umudlu

23 October 2021 8	Sabah	3 – 0	Sumgayit	Masazır
16:00 AZT (UTC+4)	Ochihava (yellow card) 55'; Fofana 60', 83'; Aghayev (yellow card) 76'; Nuriyev 79'	Report	Khachayev (red card) 12'; Sadikhov (yellow card) 87'; S.Bagherpasand (yellow card) 90+2'; Mustafayev (yellow card) 90+3'	Stadium: Bank Respublika Arena; Referee: Ingilab Məmmədov

31 October 2021 9	Gabala	1 – 3	Sabah	Qabala
16:00 AZT (UTC+4)	Mammadov (yellow card) 40'; Alimi 69' (pen.)	Report	Mickels 20'; Fofana 39' (yellow card) 68'; Isayev (yellow card) 45+1' (goal) 63'; Seydiyev (yellow card) 58'; Camalov (yellow card) 73'	Stadium: Gabala City Stadium; Referee: Elcin Masiyev

6 November 2021 10	Sabah	3 – 3	Zira	Masazır
15:00 AZT (UTC+4)	Mickels 2', 24' (yellow card) 44'; Ochihava (yellow card) 18'; Cámara (yellow card) 40' (yellow-red card) 48' (goal) 45+2'; Fofana (yellow card) 45'	Report	Volkovi 5', 60', 81'; Aliyev (yellow card) 9'; N.Andjelkovic (yellow card) 70'	Stadium: Bank Respublika Arena; Referee: Kamal Umudlu

20 November 2021 11	Neftçi	1 – 2	Sabah	Baku
18:15 AZT (UTC+4)	Stanković (yellow card) 20'; Ramon 33'; Najafov (yellow card) 54'; Lawal (yellow card) 90+4'	Report	Mickels 53', 69'; Nuriyev (yellow card) 72'; M.Ergemlidze (yellow card) 90+3'	Stadium: Eighth Kilometer District Stadium; Referee: Ravan Hamzazada

27 November 2021 12	Sabah	2 – 1	Keşla	Masazır
16:00 AZT (UTC+4)	Seydiyev 4'; Isayev 12'; Nuriyev (yellow card) 57'	Report	Qirtimov (yellow card) 34'; Bayramov (yellow card) 43'; Felipe Santos (yellow card) 45'; Tounkara 47'; Aldair (yellow card) 83'; Aliyev (yellow card) 90+2'; Q.Safarov (yellow card) 90+3'	Stadium: Bank Respublika Arena; Referee: Raad Ahmadov

4 December 2021 13	Qarabağ	5 – 1	Sabah	Baku
18:15 AZT (UTC+4)	Zoubir 16', 51'; Ozobić 35'; Wadji 77', 90'	Report	Hasanalizade 27'; Camalov (yellow card) 37'	Stadium: Azersun Arena; Referee: Aliyar Ağayev

16 December 2021 14	Sabail	0 – 3	Sabah	Baku
16:30 AZT (UTC+4)	Goxha (yellow card) 40'; Abbasov (yellow card) 45'; Naghiyev (yellow card) 72'	Report	K.Quliyev (yellow card) 1'; Mickels 33' (yellow card) 36'; Nuriyev 46'; Isayev (yellow card) 86'; Cámara 90+4'	Stadium: Bayil Arena; Referee: Elcin Masiyev

8 February 2022 15	Sabah	3 – 0	Gabala	Masazır
17:00 AZT (UTC+4)	Mickels 38'; Cámara 41'; Ochihava (yellow card) 46'; Rodríguez 76' (yellow card) 90+3'; Hasanalizade (yellow card) 85'	Report	López (yellow card) 40'	Stadium: Bank Respublika Arena; Referee: Elcin Məsiyev

20 February 2022 16	Zira	2 – 0	Sabah	Zirə
17:00 AZT (UTC+4)	Brogno (yellow card) 35'; Keyta 63', 90+4'; Taşqın (yellow card) 90+4'	Report	Fofana (yellow card) 42'; Peričić (yellow card) 89'	Stadium: Zira Olympic Sport Complex Stadium; Referee: Kamal Umudlu

27 February 2022 17	Sabah	0 – 1	Neftçi	Masazır
16:00 AZT (UTC+4)	Letić (yellow card) 90'; Mickels (yellow card) 90'; Hasanalizade (yellow card) 90+5'	Report	Meza 50'; Israfilov (yellow card) 56'; Lawal (yellow card) 66'; Brkić (yellow card) 72'; Çelik (yellow card) 90+2'	Stadium: Bank Respublika Arena; Referee: Rauf Jabarov

6 March 2022 18	Keşla	0 – 1	Sabah	Baku
17:00 AZT (UTC+4)	Hajiyev (yellow card) 29'; Tounkara (yellow card) 57'; Azadov (yellow card) 66'; Flores (yellow card) 76'; Muradbayli (yellow card) 76'	Report	Ochihava 89'; Nuriyev (yellow card) 90+2'	Stadium: ASK Arena; Referee: Ingilab Mammadov

12 March 2022 19	Sabah	0 – 1	Qarabağ	Masazır
19:00 AZT (UTC+4)	Fofana (yellow card) 6'; Christian (yellow card) 86'; Ceballos (yellow card) 90+4'	Report	Zoubir 30'; Mustafazade (yellow card) 73'; Vešović (yellow card) 89'	Stadium: Bank Respublika Arena; Referee: Farid Haciyev

19 March 2022 20	Sabah	1 – 0	Sabail	Masazır
16:45 AZT (UTC+4)	Ceballos 62' (yellow card) 90+2'	Report	Bayramli (yellow card) 73'	Stadium: Bank Respublika Arena; Referee: Aliyar Ağayev

2 April 2022 21	Sumgayit	0 – 3	Sabah	Baku
18:15 AZT (UTC+4)	Sadikhov (yellow card) 28'; Khachayev (yellow card) 47'; Turabov (yellow card) 69'	Report	Isayev 22'; Cámara 25'; Mickels 50'	Stadium: Eighth Kilometer District Stadium; Referee: Kamal Umudlu

9 April 2022 22	Sabah	3 – 1	Zira	Masazır
17:00 AZT (UTC+4)	Rangel (yellow card) 18' (goal) 40'; Hasanalizade (yellow card) 50'; Kashchuk (yellow card) 51'; Mickels 58'; Camalov (yellow card) 80'; Y.İmanov (yellow card) 82'; M.Ergemlidze (yellow card) 90+3'; Rodríguez 90+5'	Report	Keyta 48'	Stadium: Bank Respublika Arena; Referee: Raad Ahmadov

16 April 2022 23	Neftçi	1 – 0	Sabah	Baku
20:30 AZT (UTC+4)	Hasanalizade 5' (o.g.); Lawal (yellow card) 47'; Aliyev (yellow card) 77'; Bezerra (yellow card) 88'	Report	Ochihava (yellow card) 24'; A.Xaybulayev (yellow card) 34'; Rangel (yellow card) 47'	Stadium: Eighth Kilometer District Stadium; Referee: Kamal Umudlu

24 April 2022 24	Sabah	5 – 1	Shamakhi	Masazır
18:30 AZT (UTC+4)	Mickels 11', 29' (yellow card) 62'; Ochihava 25' (yellow card) 51'; Rodríguez 84'; Isayev 89'	Report	Oduwa (yellow card) 24'; Santos 50'; Qirtimov (yellow card) 53'; Azadov (yellow card) 55'; Aliyev (yellow card) 59'; Flores (red card) 90+3'	Stadium: Bank Respublika Arena; Referee: Farid Haciyev
Note: On 6 April, Keşla changed their name to Shamakhi.

3 May 2022 25	Qarabağ	1 – 1	Sabah	Baku
19:00 AZT (UTC+4)	P.Andrade (yellow card) 22' (yellow-red card) 59'; Kady 48'; Cafarguliyev (yellow card) 73'; Garayev (yellow card) 90+1'	Report	Rangel (yellow card) 2'; Camalov (yellow card) 22'; Christian 60'; Ochihava (yellow card) 71'	Stadium: Azersun Arena; Referee: Rauf Jabbarov

8 May 2022 26	Sabail	0 – 2	Sabah	Baku
18:00 AZT (UTC+4)	Arago (yellow card) 2'; Amirli (yellow card) 64'	Report	Letić 15'; Rangel 37'; Mickels (yellow card) 52'	Stadium: Bayil Arena; Referee: Elcin Masiyev

15 May 2022 27	Sabah	2 – 2	Sumgayit	Masazır
17:00 AZT (UTC+4)	Hasanalizade (yellow card) 4'; Ochihava (yellow card) 49'; Letić (yellow card) 50'; Seydiyev (red card) 53'; Christian (yellow card) 66'; Kashchuk (yellow card) 71' (goal) 90+6'; Ceballos 90+5' (pen.)	Report	Ahmadov (yellow card) 33'; S.Abdullazade (yellow card) 38'; Haghverdi (yellow card) 44'; Hüseynov 56'; Nuriyev (yellow card) 65'; R.Abdullazade (yellow card) 75'; Popovich (yellow card) 80'; Sadikhov 83'; Nabiyev (yellow card) 89'	Stadium: Bank Respublika Arena; Referee: Raad Ahmədov

21 May 2022 28	Gabala	1 – 1	Sabah	Qabala
17:00 AZT (UTC+4)	Abbasov (yellow card) 5'; Musayev 68' (yellow card) 68'	Report	Kashchuk 86'	Stadium: Gabala City Stadium; Referee: Aliyar Ağayev

==== League table ====
Pos	Team	Pld	W	D	L	GF	GA	GD	Pts	Qualification
3	Zira	28	13	8	7	33	27	+6	47	Qualification to Europa Conference League second qualifying round
4	Gabala	28	12	9	7	38	34	+4	45	Qualification to Europa Conference League second qualifying round
5	Sabah	28	12	5	11	42	34	+8	41	
6	Sumgayit	28	5	7	16	22	46	−24	22 (Note: Head-to-head points: Sumgayit 7, Shamakhi 4.)	
7	Shamakhi	28	5	7	16	25	49	−24	22	

Source: Soccerway
Rules for classification: 1) Points; 2) Head-to-head points; 3) Head-to-head goal difference; 4) Head-to-head goals scored; 5) Head-to-head away goals scored (only if two teams); 6) Goal difference; 7) Goals scored.

=== Azerbaijan Cup ===
11 December 2021 First Round	Sabah	3 – 0	Kapaz	Masazır
18:00 AZT (UTC+4)	Camalov (yellow card) 45+4'; Mickels 57', 61'; Isayev (yellow card) 71'; Alkhasov (yellow card) 81'; K.Quliyev 90+2'	Report	B.Teymurov (yellow card) 8'; U.Samadov (yellow card) 60'	Stadium: Bank Respublika Arena; Referee: Nicat İsmayıllı

1 February 2022 Quarterfinal 1st leg	Neftçi	1 – 1	Sabah	Baku
19:45 AZT (UTC+4)	Stanković 41'; Ramon (yellow card) 70'; Israfilov (yellow card) 74'; Mahmudov (yellow card) 86'	Report	Rodríguez (yellow card) 29'; Mickels 50' (yellow card) 54'; Ochihava (yellow card) 70'	Stadium: Eighth Kilometer District Stadium; Referee: Aliyar Agayev

12 February 2022 Quarterfinal 2nd leg	Sabah	1 – 3 (2 – 4 agg.)	Neftçi	Masazır
16:00 AZT (UTC+4)	Nuriyev (yellow card) 34'; Cámara 42'; Rodríguez (yellow card) 70'; Isayev (red card) 75'; Aghayev (red card) 75'; Mickels (yellow card) 76'; M.Ergemlidze (yellow card) 76'; Ochihava (yellow card) 90+9'	Report	Najafov (yellow card) 22'; Mahmudov 61'; Ramon 62', 68'; Israfilov (yellow card) 74'	Stadium: Bank Respublika Arena; Referee: Ravan Hamzazada

== Squad statistics ==
As of match played 21 May 2022

=== Appearances and goals ===
No.	Pos	Nat	Player	Total		Premier League		Azerbaijan Cup	
No.	Pos	Nat	Player	Apps	Goals	Apps	Goals	Apps	Goals
1	GK	(Azerbaijan) AZE	Salahat Aghayev	20	0	17	0	3	0
2	DF	(Azerbaijan) AZE	Amin Seydiyev	28	1	24+1	1	2+1	0
3	DF	(Ukraine) UKR	Zurab Ochihava	20	2	18	2	2	0
4	MF	(Azerbaijan) AZE	Elvin Camalov	29	0	26	0	3	0
7	DF	(Bosnia and Herzegovina) BIH	Bojan Letić	11	1	11	1	0	0
8	MF	(Azerbaijan) AZE	Sakir Seyidov	6	0	2+3	0	1	0
9	FW	(Paraguay) PAR	Julio Rodríguez	16	3	5+9	3	2	0
10	MF	(Azerbaijan) AZE	Aleksey Isayev	30	6	27	6	3	0
11	MF	(Spain) ESP	Cristian Ceballos	10	2	5+5	2	0	0
14	DF	(Azerbaijan) AZE	Slavik Alkhasov	18	0	11+4	0	3	0
15	MF	(Brazil) BRA	Christian	13	1	8+5	1	0	0
17	MF	(Spain) ESP	Juan Cámara	22	5	15+4	4	3	1
18	MF	(Ukraine) UKR	Oleksiy Kashchuk	8	2	7+1	2	0	0
19	FW	(Azerbaijan) AZE	Kamran Quliyev	4	1	1+2	0	0+1	1
20	MF	(Germany) GER	Joy-Lance Mickels	28	14	24+1	11	3	3
21	MF	(Azerbaijan) AZE	Ildar Alekperov	8	0	2+6	0	0	0
24	FW	(Georgia (country)) GEO	Mikheil Ergemlidze	12	0	4+7	0	0+1	0
26	FW	(Ivory Coast) CIV	Tiemoko Fofana	22	3	13+7	3	1+1	0
29	MF	(Azerbaijan) AZE	Jeyhun Nuriyev	19	2	7+9	2	2+1	0
33	FW	(Azerbaijan) AZE	Jamal Jafarov	13	0	6+5	0	0+2	0
34	DF	(Azerbaijan) AZE	Bakhtiyar Hasanalizade	27	1	24	1	3	0
55	DF	(Croatia) CRO	Špiro Peričić	15	1	12+2	1	1	0
66	MF	(Azerbaijan) AZE	Abdulla Khaybulayev	13	0	9+3	0	1	0
73	FW	(Brazil) BRA	Lucas Rangel	8	2	7+1	2	0	0
77	MF	(Azerbaijan) AZE	Veysal Rzayev	4	0	0+4	0	0	0
94	GK	(Azerbaijan) AZE	Yusif İmanov	8	0	8	0	0	0
97	GK	(Belarus) BLR	Alyaksandr Nyachayew	1	0	0	0	0+1	0
99	DF	(Brazil) BRA	Higor Gabriel	2	0	2	0	0	0
Players away on loan:
5	DF	(Azerbaijan) AZE	Arsen Agjabayov	1	0	1	0	0	0
Players who left Sabah during the season:
7	MF	(Azerbaijan) AZE	Joshgun Diniyev	2	0	2	0	0	0
7	FW	(Serbia) SRB	Petar Škuletić	4	0	3+1	0	0	0
16	GK	(Serbia) SRB	Saša Stamenković	3	0	3	0	0	0

=== Goal scorers ===
Place	Position	Nation	Number	Name	Premier League	Azerbaijan Cup	Total
1	MF	(Germany)	20	Joy-Lance Mickels	11	3	14
2	MF	(Azerbaijan)	10	Aleksey Isayev	6	0	6
3	MF	(Spain)	17	Juan Cámara	4	1	5
4	FW	(Ivory Coast)	26	Tiemoko Fofana	3	0	3
4	FW	(Paraguay)	9	Julio Rodríguez	3	0	3
6	MF	(Azerbaijan)	29	Jeyhun Nuriyev	2	0	2
6	DF	(Ukraine)	3	Zurab Ochihava	2	0	2
6	FW	(Brazil)	73	Lucas Rangel	2	0	2
6	MF	(Spain)	11	Cristian Ceballos	2	0	2
6	MF	(Ukraine)	18	Oleksiy Kashchuk	2	0	2
11	DF	(Croatia)	55	Špiro Peričić	1	0	1
11	DF	(Azerbaijan)	2	Amin Seydiyev	1	0	1
11	DF	(Azerbaijan)	34	Bakhtiyar Hasanalizade	1	0	1
11	MF	(Brazil)	15	Christian	1	0	1
11	DF	(Bosnia and Herzegovina)	7	Bojan Letić	1	0	1
11	FW	(Azerbaijan)	19	Kamran Quliyev	0	1	1
				TOTALS	42	5	47

=== Clean sheets ===
Place	Position	Nation	Number	Name	Premier League	Azerbaijan Cup	Total
1	GK	(Azerbaijan)	1	Salahat Aghayev	4	1	5
2	GK	(Azerbaijan)	94	Yusif İmanov	3	0	3
				TOTALS	7	1	8

=== Disciplinary record ===
Number	Nation	Position	Name	Premier League		Azerbaijan Cup		Total	
Number	Nation	Position	Name	Yellow card	Red card	Yellow card	Red card	Yellow card	Red card
1	(Azerbaijan)	GK	Salahat Aghayev	1	0	0	1	1	1
2	(Azerbaijan)	DF	Amin Seydiyev	4	1	0	0	4	1
3	(Ukraine)	DF	Zurab Ochihava	8	0	2	0	10	0
4	(Azerbaijan)	MF	Elvin Camalov	5	0	1	0	6	0
7	(Bosnia and Herzegovina)	DF	Bojan Letić	2	0	0	0	2	0
8	(Azerbaijan)	MF	Sakir Seyidov	1	0	0	0	1	0
9	(Paraguay)	FW	Julio Rodríguez	2	1	2	0	4	1
10	(Azerbaijan)	MF	Aleksey Isayev	2	0	1	1	3	1
11	(Spain)	MF	Cristian Ceballos	4	0	0	0	4	0
14	(Azerbaijan)	DF	Slavik Alkhasov	0	0	1	0	1	0
15	(Brazil)	MF	Christian	2	0	0	0	2	0
17	(Spain)	MF	Juan Cámara	2	1	0	0	2	1
18	(Ukraine)	MF	Oleksiy Kashchuk	2	0	0	0	2	0
19	(Azerbaijan)	FW	Kamran Quliyev	1	0	0	0	1	0
20	(Germany)	MF	Joy-Lance Mickels	7	1	2	0	9	1
21	(Azerbaijan)	MF	Ildar Alekperov	1	0	0	0	1	0
24	(Georgia (country))	FW	Mikheil Ergemlidze	3	0	1	0	4	0
26	(Ivory Coast)	FW	Tiemoko Fofana	5	0	0	0	5	0
29	(Azerbaijan)	MF	Jeyhun Nuriyev	3	0	1	0	4	0
33	(Azerbaijan)	FW	Jamal Jafarov	1	0	0	0	1	0
34	(Azerbaijan)	DF	Bakhtiyar Hasanalizade	6	0	0	0	6	0
55	(Croatia)	DF	Špiro Peričić	1	0	0	0	1	0
66	(Azerbaijan)	MF	Abdulla Khaybulayev	2	0	0	0	2	0
73	(Brazil)	FW	Lucas Rangel	3	0	0	0	3	0
77	(Azerbaijan)	MF	Veysal Rzayev	1	0	0	0	1	0
94	(Azerbaijan)	GK	Yusif İmanov	1	0	0	0	1	0
Players who left Sabah during the season:
			TOTALS	67	4	11	2	78	6
