= 2022–23 Sabah FC season =

Sabah
2022–23 season
- Manager: Murad Musayev
- Stadium: Bank Respublika Arena
- Premier League: 2nd
- Azerbaijan Cup: Quarterfinal vs Sabail
- Top goalscorer: League: Joy-Lance Mickels (17); All: Joy-Lance Mickels (17)

The Sabah FC 2022–23 season was Sabah's fifth Azerbaijan Premier League season, and their sixth season in existence.

== Season events ==
On 25 May 2022, Sabah announced the signing of Tellur Mutallimov to a two-year contract from Sumgayit.

On 9 June, Anatoliy Nuriyev joined Sabah on a three-year contract from Kolos Kovalivka. Three days later, 12 June, Davit Volkovi joined from Zira on a two-year contract.

On 17 June, Namiq Alesgerov signed on a three-year contract from Bursaspor.

On 10 July, Spanish defender Jon Irazabal arrived from Amorebieta, signing a two-year contract. Five days later, 15 July, Abdoulaye Ba signed a one-year contract with Sabah, with the option of an additional year, from Arouca. Three days after that, 18 July, Emmanuel Apeh signed a two-year contract with Sabah from Tenerife.

On 29 December, Alyaksandr Nyachayew left Sabah after his contract was terminated by mutual agreement.

On 3 January, Abdulla Rzayev was recalled from his loan deal at Shamakhi, and joined Kapaz on loan for the remainder of the season, along with Idris Ingilabli.

On 28 January, Abdulla Khaybulayev was loaned to Samtredia until December 2023.

On 4 February, Higor Gabriel was loaned to Lviv until June 2023.

== Squad ==
As of match played 28 May 2023

No.	Name	Nationality	Position	Date of birth (age)	Signed from	Signed in	Contract ends	Apps.	Goals
Goalkeepers
12	Yusif Imanov	(Azerbaijan)	GK	27 September 2002 (aged 20)	Academy	2020		43	0
16	Rustam Samiqullin	(Azerbaijan)	GK	23 December 2002 (aged 20)	Academy	2020		2	0
94	Nijat Mehbaliyev	(Azerbaijan)	GK	11 September 2000 (aged 22)	Qarabağ	2020	2023	5	0
Defenders
2	Amin Seydiyev	(Azerbaijan)	DF	15 November 1998 (aged 24)	Gabala	2020	2023	88	2
3	Zurab Ochihava	(Ukraine)	DF	18 May 1995 (aged 28)	FCI Levadia	2021	2022	36	2
7	Bojan Letić	(Bosnia and Herzegovina)	DF	21 December 1992 (aged 30)	Unattached	2022		48	1
13	Abdoulaye Ba	(Senegal)	DF	1 January 1991 (aged 32)	Arouca	2022	2023 (+1)	23	2
14	Bakhtiyar Hasanalizade	(Azerbaijan)	DF	29 December 1992 (aged 30)	Zira	2020	2022	58	2
17	Tellur Mutallimov	(Azerbaijan)	DF	8 April 1995 (aged 28)	Sumgayit	2022	2024	31	0
19	Jon Irazabal	(Spain)	DF	28 November 1996 (aged 26)	SD Amorebieta	2022	2022 (+2)	31	2
Midfielders
4	Elvin Jamalov	(Azerbaijan)	MF	4 February 1995 (aged 28)	Zira	2021	2023	64	2
8	Oleksiy Kashchuk	(Ukraine)	MF	29 June 2000 (aged 22)	on loan from Shakhtar Donetsk	2022		41	18
9	Anatoliy Nuriyev	(Azerbaijan)	MF	20 May 1996 (aged 27)	Kolos Kovalivka	2022	2025	34	4
10	Aleksey Isayev	(Azerbaijan)	MF	9 November 1995 (aged 27)	Sumgayit	2020	2023	86	10
11	Cristian Ceballos	(Spain)	MF	3 December 1992 (aged 30)	Qatar	2021	2024	31	5
15	Christian	(Brazil)	MF	14 June 1989 (aged 33)	Académica de Coimbra	2022	2023	34	2
20	Joy-Lance Mickels	(Germany)	MF	29 March 1994 (aged 29)	MVV Maastricht	2021	2023	66	31
21	Ildar Alekperov	(Azerbaijan)	MF	7 April 2001 (aged 22)	Neftekhimik Nizhnekamsk	2021	2024	29	0
22	Seymur Mammadov	(Azerbaijan)	MF	29 May 2003 (aged 19)	Academy	2022		3	1
29	Jeyhun Nuriyev	(Azerbaijan)	MF	30 March 2001 (aged 22)	Academy	2020		49	4
77	Namiq Ələsgərov	(Azerbaijan)	MF	3 February 1995 (aged 28)	Bursaspor	2022	2025	24	2
Forwards
18	Davit Volkovi	(Georgia (country))	FW	3 June 1995 (aged 27)	Zira	2022	2024	38	12
33	Jamal Jafarov	(Azerbaijan)	FW	25 February 2002 (aged 21)	Anzhi Makhachkala	2020	2025	22	0
99	Emmanuel Apeh	(Nigeria)	FW	25 October 1996 (aged 26)	Tenerife	2022	2024	37	11
Out on loan
5	Idris Ingilabli	(Azerbaijan)	MF	6 October 2001 (aged 21)	Gabala	2020	2024	1	0
6	Abdulla Khaybulayev	(Azerbaijan)	MF	19 August 2001 (aged 21)	Academy	2021		19	0
	Abdulla Rzayev	(Azerbaijan)	DF	12 March 2002 (aged 21)	Academy	2020		17	0
	Higor Gabriel	(Brazil)	DF	28 April 1999 (aged 24)	Unattached	2022	2024	2	0
	Veysal Rzayev	(Azerbaijan)	MF	24 October 2002 (aged 20)	Academy	2020		17	0
	Shakir Seyidov	(Azerbaijan)	MF	31 December 2000 (aged 22)	Academy	2018	2023	49	2
	Kamran Guliyev	(Azerbaijan)	FW	11 March 2000 (aged 23)	Jonava	2021		5	1
Left during the season
1	Alyaksandr Nyachayew	(Belarus)	GK	21 April 1994 (aged 29)	Rukh Brest	2022	2023	1	0
26	Tiemoko Fofana	(Ivory Coast)	FW	22 October 1999 (aged 23)	Ilves	2021		35	5

== Transfers ==
=== In ===
Date	Position	Nationality	Name	From	Fee	Ref.
25 May 2022	DF	(Azerbaijan)	Tellur Mutallimov	Sumgayit	Undisclosed	
9 June 2022	FW	(Azerbaijan)	Anatoliy Nuriyev	Kolos Kovalivka	Undisclosed	
12 June 2022	FW	(Georgia (country))	Davit Volkovi	Zira	Undisclosed	
17 June 2022	MF	(Azerbaijan)	Namiq Alesgerov	Bursaspor	Undisclosed	
10 July 2022	DF	(Spain)	Jon Irazabal	Amorebieta	Undisclosed	
15 July 2022	DF	(Senegal)	Abdoulaye Ba	Arouca	Undisclosed	
18 July 2022	FW	(Nigeria)	Emmanuel Apeh	Tenerife	Undisclosed	

=== Loans in ===
Date from	Position	Nationality	Name	From	Date to	Ref.
1 July 2022	MF	(Ukraine)	Oleksiy Kashchuk	Shakhtar Donetsk		

=== Loans out ===
Date from	Position	Nationality	Name	To	Date to	Ref.
29 June 2022	MF	(Azerbaijan)	Shakir Seyidov	Turan Tovuz	End of season	
29 June 2022	MF	(Azerbaijan)	Veysal Rzayev	Turan Tovuz	End of season	
20 July 2022	DF	(Azerbaijan)	Abdulla Rzayev	Shamakhi	3 January 2023	
20 July 2022	FW	(Azerbaijan)	Kamran Guliyev	Shamakhi	End of season	
21 July 2022	DF	(Brazil)	Higor Gabriel	Dinamo Minsk	31 December 2022	
3 January 2023	DF	(Azerbaijan)	Abdulla Rzayev	Kapaz	End of season	
3 January 2023	MF	(Azerbaijan)	Idris Ingilabli	Kapaz	End of season	
28 January 2023	MF	(Azerbaijan)	Abdulla Khaybulayev	Samtredia	December 2023	
4 February 2023	DF	(Brazil)	Higor Gabriel	Lviv	End of season	

=== Released ===
Date	Position	Nationality	Name	Joined	Date	Ref
4 June 2022	GK	(Azerbaijan)	Səlahət Ağayev	Gabala	4 June 2022	
8 July 2022	FW	(Georgia (country))	Mikheil Ergemlidze	Kapaz		
29 December 2022	GK	(Belarus)	Alyaksandr Nyachayew	Minsk	13 February 2023	
31 December 2022	FW	(Ivory Coast)	Tiemoko Fofana	Haka	17 May 2023	

== Friendlies ==
12 January 2023	Warta Poznań (Poland)	1 – 1	(Azerbaijan) Sabah	Belek, Turkey
18:00 AZT (UTC+4)	Destan 89'	Report	Kashchuk 42'

18 January 2023	Vojvodina (Serbia)	2 – 4	(Azerbaijan) Sabah	Belek, Turkey
18:00 AZT (UTC+4)	V.Simić 6', 9'	Report	Volkovi 4', 22'; Isayev 56'; Kashchuk 62'

13 May 2023	Sabah (Azerbaijan)	3 – 3	(Turkey) Beşiktaş	Baku, Azerbaijan
18:00 AZT (UTC+4)	Kashchuk 3', 5'; Mickels (penalty missed) 42' (yellow card) 62'; Irazabal (yellow card) 61'; Volkovi 70'; Nuriyev (yellow card) 78'	Report	Meraş 24', 44'; Tosun 63' (pen.)	Stadium: Tofiq Bahramov Republican Stadium

== Competitions ==
=== Overview ===
Competition	First match	Last match	Starting round	Final position	Record							
Competition	First match	Last match	Starting round	Final position	Pld	W	D	L	GF	GA	GD	Win %
Premier League	7 August 2022	28 May 2023	Matchday 1	2nd	36	25	6	5	75	24	+51	69.44
Azerbaijan Cup	23 November 2022	19 December 2022	First Round	Quarterfinal	3	1	0	2	7	4	+3	33.33
Total					39	26	6	7	82	28	+54	66.67

Last updated: 28 May 2023
Source: Competitions

=== Premier League ===
==== Results summary ====
Overall								Home						Away					
Pld	W	D	L	GF	GA	GD	Pts	W	D	L	GF	GA	GD	W	D	L	GF	GA	GD
36	25	6	5	75	24	+51	81	13	4	1	35	9	+26	12	2	4	40	15	+25

Last updated: 28 May 2023.
Source: See Results

==== Results by round ====
Round	1	2	3	4	5	6	7	8	9	10	11	12	13	14	15	16	17	18	19	20	21	22	23	24	25	26	27	28	29	30	31	32	33	34	35	36
Ground	H	A	H	A	H	A	H	A	H	H	A	H	A	H	A	H	A	A	H	A	H	A	H	A	H	H	A	H	A	H	A	H	A	A	H	A
Result	W	W	W	W	D	L	W	W	W	W	W	W	W	D	W	D	D	W	W	W	W	D	L	L	W	W	W	W	L	W	W	W	W	W	D	L
Position	1	1	2	1	1	3	3	2	2	2	2	2	2	2	2	2	2	2	2	2	2	2	2	2	2	2	2	2	2	2	2	2	2	2	2	2

Updated to match(es) played on 28 May 2023. Source: See Results
A = Away; H = Home; W = Win; D = Draw; L = Loss

==== Results ====
7 August 2022 1	Sabah	3 – 0	Sumgayit	Masazır
19:15 AZT (UTC+4)	A.Nuriyev 28'; Mickels 53'; Ceballos (yellow card) 88' (goal) 90+5'	Report	Pereira (yellow card) 61'; Nurmugamet (yellow card) 84'	Stadium: Bank Respublika Arena; Referee: Elcin Məsiyev

12 August 2022 2	Zira	1 – 3	Sabah	Zirə
19:00 AZT (UTC+4)	Khalilzade (yellow card) 17'; Taşqın 34'; Adiléhou (yellow card) 80'	Report	Ba 5'; Mickels 27' (yellow card) 70'; Ələsgərov 48' (yellow card) 49'; J.Nuriyev (yellow card) 73'; Isayev (yellow card) 75'	Stadium: Zira Olympic Sport Complex Stadium; Referee: Ingilab Mammadov

20 August 2022 3	Sabah	2 – 1	Neftçi	Masazır
20:30 AZT (UTC+4)	Letić (yellow card) 35'; Isayev 78' (pen.) (yellow card) 81'; Ba (yellow card) 82'; Apeh 90+1' (pen.); J.Nuriyev (yellow card) 90+2'	Report	Kvirkvelia (yellow card) 36'; Lawal 45+1'; Stanković (yellow card) 82'; Eddy (yellow card) 84'	Stadium: Bank Respublika Arena; Referee: Farid Haciyev

28 August 2022 4	Gabala	0 – 2	Sabah	Qabala
20:00 AZT (UTC+4)	Isayev (yellow card) 11'; Felipe (yellow card) 61'; Ruan (yellow card) 66'; Raphael (yellow card) 66'; Abu Akel (yellow card) 87'	Report	Volkovi 48'; Mickels 64' (yellow card) 66'; Isayev (yellow card) 66'; Mutallimov (yellow card) 66'	Stadium: City Stadium; Referee: Aliyar Agayev

4 September 2022 5	Sabah	0 – 0	Sabail	Masazır
18:00 AZT (UTC+4)	Volkovi (yellow card) 24'; Mickels (yellow card) 90+5'	Report	Ramazanov (yellow card) 59'; Manafov (yellow card) 64'; França (yellow card) 90+5'	Stadium: Bank Respublika Arena; Referee: Nicat İsmayıllı

11 September 2022 6	Qarabağ	4 – 3	Sabah	Baku
20:30 AZT (UTC+4)	Qurbanlı 29'; Cafarguliyev 51'; Bayramov (yellow card) 78'; Sheydayev 84' (pen.), 90+3' (pen.)	Report	Ba (yellow card) 18' (yellow-red card) 43'; Apeh 33'; Mickels 60'; Kashchuk 68'; Seydiyev (yellow card) 83'; Camalov (yellow card) 90+2'; Isayev (yellow card) 90+2'; Alekperov (yellow card) 90+2'	Stadium: Azersun Arena; Referee: Ingilab Mammadov

16 September 2022 7	Sabah	3 – 1	Turan Tovuz	Masazır
18:00 AZT (UTC+4)	Volkovi 15'; Apeh (yellow card) 18'; Mickels 34'; Camalov 90+5' (pen.)	Report	Seyidov (red card) 36'; Shahverdiyev (yellow card) 75'; Wankewai 81'	Stadium: Bank Respublika Arena; Referee: Rauf Jabbarov

2 October 2022 8	Shamakhi	0 – 1	Sabah	Shamakhi
15:30 AZT (UTC+4)	Haziyev (yellow card) 35'	Report	Camalov (yellow card) 35'; A.Nuriyev (yellow card) 50'; Ba 90+1'; Seydiyev (yellow card) 90+1'	Stadium: City Stadium; Referee: Tural Qurbanov

9 October 2022 9	Sabah	5 – 0	Kapaz	Masazır
19:30 AZT (UTC+4)	Mickels 22'; Letić (yellow card) 38'; Kashchuk 39', 52'; A.Nuriyev 42' (yellow card) 70'; Camalov (yellow card) 47'; Ələsgərov 82'	Report	Isaiah (yellow card) 40'; Samadov (yellow card) 60'; Akhundov (yellow card) 86'	Stadium: Bank Respublika Arena; Referee: Raad Ahmadov

15 October 2022 10	Sabah	1 – 0	Zira	Masazır
17:30 AZT (UTC+4)	Isayev (yellow card) 65'; Apeh 72'	Report	Diniyev (yellow card) 42' (yellow-red card) 84'	Stadium: Bank Respublika Arena; Referee: Elcin Masiyev

23 October 2022 11	Neftçi	2 – 3	Sabah	Baku
18:30 AZT (UTC+4)	Buludov 71'; Zulfugarli (red card) 75'; Stanković (yellow card) 80'; Mahmudov 83' (pen.); Saief (yellow card) 84'	Report	Ba (yellow card) 33'; Mickels 37'; Apeh 45+6'; Isayev (yellow card) 49' (goal) 52'; Seydiyev (yellow card) 63'	Stadium: Azersun Arena; Referee: Kamal Umudlu

30 October 2022 12	Sabah	2 – 1	Gabala	Masazır
18:30 AZT (UTC+4)	Camalov (yellow card) 4'; Irazabal (yellow card) 34'; Letić (yellow card) 48'; Kashchuk 63'; Ba (yellow card) 90'; Volkovi 90+3'	Report	Alimi 5' (pen.); Abu Akel (yellow card) 59'; Rustamli (yellow card) 71'; Qirtimov (yellow card) 90'	Stadium: Bank Respublika Arena; Referee: Tural Qurbanov

6 November 2022 13	Sabail	0 – 2	Sabah	Baku
15:00 AZT (UTC+4)		Report	Seydiyev (yellow card) 14'; J.Nuriyev 37'; Kashchuk 47'	Stadium: Bayil Arena; Referee: Aliyar Agayev

13 November 2022 14	Sabah	0 – 0	Qarabağ	Masazır
17:00 AZT (UTC+4)	Isayev (yellow card) 60'	Report		Stadium: Bank Respublika Arena; Referee: Farid Haciyev

29 November 2022 15	Turan Tovuz	0 – 1	Sabah	Tovuz
14:00 AZT (UTC+4)		Report	Camalov (yellow card) 71'; Kashchuk 80'; J.Nuriyev (yellow card) 86'	Stadium: City Stadium; Referee: Rauf Jabbarov

3 December 2022 16	Sabah	1 – 1	Shamakhi	Masazır
17:00 AZT (UTC+4)	Ceballos 2' (red card) 24'; Seydiyev (yellow card) 45+1'	Report	K.Guliyev (yellow card) 55'; Hüseynov (yellow card) 72'; Mustafayev (red card) 75'; Bayramov 88'	Stadium: Bank Respublika Arena; Referee: Ravan Hamzazada

14 December 2022 17	Kapaz	2 – 2	Sabah	Ganja
14:00 AZT (UTC+4)	Shuaibu 35', 73'; Y.Nabiyev (yellow card) 66'; Suleymanov (yellow card) 69'; Kantaria (yellow card) 90+2'	Report	Mickels 33'; Apeh (yellow card) 66'; Kashchuk 87'; J.Nuriyev (red card) 90'; Ba (yellow card) 90+5'	Stadium: City Stadium; Referee: Farid Haciyev

23 December 2023 18	Sumgayit	0 – 6	Sabah	Sumgait
18:30 AZT (UTC+4)	Badalov (yellow card) 68'; Mustafayev (yellow card) 79'	Report	Apeh 3' (yellow card) 20'; Mickels 14'; Kashchuk 28'; Camalov 33'; A.Nuriyev 77'; Khaybulayev (yellow card) 84'; Volkovi 85'	Stadium: Kapital Bank Arena; Referee: Aliyar Agayev

26 January 2023 19	Sabah	2 – 0	Neftçi	Masazır
19:00 AZT (UTC+4)	Mickels 7' (pen.); Kashchuk 37'	Report	Jaber (yellow card) 21'; Mahmudov (yellow card) 78'	Stadium: Bank Respublika Arena; Referee: Aliyar Agayev

1 February 2023 20	Gabala	0 – 3	Sabah	Qabala
15:00 AZT (UTC+4)	Ruan (yellow card) 21' (yellow-red card) 27'; Ağayev (yellow card) 27'; Alimi (yellow card) 27'; Musayev (yellow card) 28'; Isayev (yellow card) 76'	Report	Seydiyev (yellow card) 16'; Camalov (yellow card) 45'; Volkovi (yellow card) 53' (goal) 61'; Irazabal 70'; Nuriyev (yellow card) 75'; Ceballos (yellow card) 87'; Mickels 89'	Stadium: City Stadium; Referee: Vugar Hasanli

6 February 2023 21	Sabah	4 – 0	Sabail	Masazır
18:00 AZT (UTC+4)	Mickels 4'; Volkovi 10', 31'; Irazabal (red card) 68'; Apeh 83'	Report	França (yellow card) 62'; Amirguliyev (yellow card) 69' (yellow-red card) 78'	Stadium: Bank Respublika Arena; Referee: Ingilab Mammadov

11 February 2023 22	Qarabağ	1 – 1	Sabah	Baku
17:00 AZT (UTC+4)	Qurbanlı 15'; Cafarguliyev (yellow card) 32'; Diakhaby (yellow card) 71'	Report	Kashchuk (yellow card) 26'; Jamalov (yellow card) 48'; Həsənalızadə (yellow card) 60' (goal) 75'	Stadium: Azersun Arena; Referee: Elcin Masiyev

19 February 2023 23	Sabah	0 – 2	Turan Tovuz	Masazır
16:30 AZT (UTC+4)	Camalov (yellow card) 35'; Ba (yellow card) 54'; Letić (yellow card) 90+7'	Report	Oduwa 11'; Marakvelidze (yellow card) 25'; Xulu (yellow card) 39'; Guseynov 64'; Najafov (yellow card) 65'; Turabov (yellow card) 73'	Stadium: Bank Respublika Arena; Referee: Kamal Umudlu

25 February 2023 24	Shamakhi	2 – 1	Sabah	Shamakhi
14:30 AZT (UTC+4)	Yunanov 72', 90+4' (pen.) (yellow card) 90+4'; Mustafayev (yellow card) 83'; Azizli (yellow card) 90+2'	Report	Seydiyev (yellow card) 55'; Volkovi (yellow card) 68'; Kashchuk 77'; Irazabal (yellow card) 90+3'	Stadium: City Stadium; Referee: Kamranbay Rahimov

4 March 2023 25	Sabah	2 – 0	Kapaz	Masazır
18:30 AZT (UTC+4)	Ələsgərov (yellow card) 22'; Isayev 40' (yellow card) 90+5'; Mutallimov (yellow card) 47'; Nuriyev (yellow card) 80' (yellow-red card) 90+6' (goal) 90+4'	Report	Shuaibu (red card) 15'; Khvalko (yellow card) 39'; F.Nabiyev (yellow card) 90+2'	Stadium: Bank Respublika Arena; Referee: Rauf Allahverdiyev

10 March 2023 26	Sabah	4 – 0	Sumgayit	Masazır
19:00 AZT (UTC+4)	Letić (yellow card) 37'; Mickels 45'; Kashchuk 75'; Nuriyev 86'; Mammadov 90+2' (yellow card) 90+3'	Report	Todoroski (yellow card) 37'; Mustafayev (yellow card) 51'; Pereira (yellow card) 83'	Stadium: Bank Respublika Arena; Referee: Tural Qurbanov

15 March 2023 27	Zira	0 – 2	Sabah	Zirə
20:30 AZT (UTC+4)		Report	Seydiyev (yellow card) 7'; Volkovi 52'; Mickels 62'; Camalov (yellow card) 70'; Nuriyev (yellow card) 89'	Stadium: Zira Olympic Sport Complex Stadium; Referee: Farid Haciyev

2 April 2023 28	Sabah	3 – 2	Gabala	Masazır
19:00 AZT (UTC+4)	Qirtimov 9' (o.g.); Mickels 86'; Kashchuk 90+5'	Report	Isgandarov 21'; Abu Akel 28'; Isayev (yellow card) 30'; Felipe (yellow card) 45+1'; Musayev (yellow card) 77'; Alimi (yellow card) 88'	Stadium: Bank Respublika Arena; Referee: Javid Jalilov

8 April 2023 29	Sabail	2 – 1	Sabah	Baku
17:30 AZT (UTC+4)	Gomis 29'; Zakpa 90+5'	Report	Seydiyev (yellow card) 7'; Letić (yellow card) 21'; Isayev (yellow card) 24'; Irazabal (red card) 59'; Apeh 75' (pen.); Camalov (yellow card) 83'	Stadium: Bayil Arena; Referee: Ingilab Məmmədov

16 April 2023 30	Sabah	2 – 1	Qarabağ	Masazır
19:00 AZT (UTC+4)	Mutallimov (yellow card) 14'; Mickels 72', 77'	Report	Romão (yellow card) 13'; Richard 86' (pen.)	Stadium: Bank Respublika Arena; Referee: Tural Qurbanov

22 April 2023 31	Turan Tovuz	0 – 2	Sabah	Tovuz
17:00 AZT (UTC+4)	Turabov (yellow card) 86'	Report	Kashchuk 28', 66'; Isayev (yellow card) 84'	Stadium: City Stadium; Referee: Javid Jalilov

29 April 2023 32	Sabah	1 – 0	Shamakhi	Masazır
18:30 AZT (UTC+4)	Kashchuk 8'; Irazabal (yellow card) 14'; Həsənalızadə (yellow card) 51'	Report		Stadium: Bank Respublika Arena; Referee: Farid Haciyev

5 May 2023 33	Kapaz	0 – 3	Sabah	Ganja
18:00 AZT (UTC+4)		Report	Kashchuk 4'; Ba (yellow card) 18'; Apeh 16'; Seydiyev (yellow card) 24'; Letić (yellow card) 55'; Volkovi 83'	Stadium: City Stadium; Referee: Raas Ahmadov

17 May 2023 34	Sumgayit	0 – 4	Sabah	Sumgait
19:30 AZT (UTC+4)	Todoroski (yellow card) 29'; Khachayev (yellow card) 53'; Pereira (yellow card) 65'; Abdullazade (yellow card) 80'	Report	Irazabal 34'; Volkovi 44' hristian 45+1'; Ceballos (yellow card) 61' (goal) 72'	Stadium: Kapital Bank Arena; Referee: Javid Jalilov

22 May 2023 35	Sabah	0 – 0	Zira	Masazır
16:30 AZT (UTC+4)	Ceballos (yellow card) 37'; Ələsgərov (yellow card) 77'; Nuriyev (yellow card) 81'	Report	Djibrilla (yellow card) 55'; Keyta (yellow card) 87'	Stadium: Bank Respublika Arena; Referee: Ingilab Mammadov

28 May 2023 36	Neftçi	1 – 0	Sabah	Baku
17:00 AZT (UTC+4)	Mahmudov 9'; Jaber (yellow card) 32'; Saief (yellow card) 63'; Eddy (yellow card) 84'	Report	Ba (yellow card) 90+5'	Stadium: Bakcell Arena; Referee: Ravan Hamzazada

==== League table ====
Pos	Team	Pld	W	D	L	GF	GA	GD	Pts	Qualification
1	Qarabağ (C)	36	28	6	2	91	25	+66	90	Qualification for the Champions League first qualifying round
2	Sabah	36	25	6	5	75	24	+51	81	Qualification to Europa Conference League second qualifying round
3	Neftçi	36	20	8	8	63	38	+25	68	Qualification to Europa Conference League second qualifying round
4	Gabala	36	13	11	12	47	47	0	50	Qualification to Europa Conference League second qualifying round
5	Zira	36	13	11	12	45	46	−1	50	

Source: Soccerway
Rules for classification: 1) Points; 2) Head-to-head points; 3) Head-to-head goal difference; 4) Head-to-head goals scored; 5) Head-to-head away goals scored (only if two teams); 6) Goal difference; 7) Goals scored.
(C) Champions

=== Azerbaijan Cup ===
23 November 2022 First round	Sabah	5 – 0	Qaradağ Lökbatan	Masazır
17:00 AZT (UTC+4)	Mickels (yellow card) 29'; Volkovi 33'; Həsənalızadə 38'; Apeh 62', 88', 90+1'; Camalov (yellow card) 66'	Report	Mammadov (yellow card) 35'; Jafarov 47'	Stadium: Bank Respublika Arena; Referee: Sabuhi Bayramov

9 December 2022 Quarterfinal 1st leg	Sabail	3 – 2	Sabah	Baku
17:00 AZT (UTC+4)	Kizito 32'; Mazurek 62', 72'	Report	Mehbaliyev (red card) 12'; Ba (yellow card) 36'; Letić (yellow card) 45+1'; Camalov (yellow card) 58'; Ceballos 80'; Volkovi 90+4'	Stadium: Bayil Arena; Referee: Nijat Ismayilli

19 December 2022 Quarterfinal 2nd leg	Sabah	0 – 1 (2 – 4 agg.)	Sabail	Masazır
19:00 AZT (UTC+4)	Mickels (yellow card) 45+1'	Report	Taghiyev (yellow card) 45+3'; Zakpa 74'; Gurbanli (yellow card) 89'	Stadium: Bank Respublika Arena; Referee: Elçin Masiyev

== Squad statistics ==
As of match played 28 May 2023

=== Appearances and goals ===
No.	Pos	Nat	Player	Total		Premier League		Azerbaijan Cup	
No.	Pos	Nat	Player	Apps	Goals	Apps	Goals	Apps	Goals
2	DF	(Azerbaijan) AZE	Amin Seydiyev	35	0	33+1	0	1	0
3	DF	(Ukraine) UKR	Zurab Ochihava	5	0	5	0	0	0
4	MF	(Azerbaijan) AZE	Elvin Camalov	35	2	31+2	2	2	0
7	DF	(Bosnia and Herzegovina) BIH	Bojan Letić	37	0	33+1	0	3	0
8	MF	(Ukraine) UKR	Oleksiy Kashchuk	33	16	30+1	16	2	0
9	MF	(Azerbaijan) AZE	Anatoliy Nuriyev	34	4	21+11	4	1+1	0
10	MF	(Azerbaijan) AZE	Aleksey Isayev	36	3	34	3	1+1	0
11	MF	(Spain) ESP	Cristian Ceballos	21	4	3+16	3	1+1	1
12	GK	(Azerbaijan) AZE	Yusif Imanov	35	0	33	0	1+1	0
13	DF	(Senegal) SEN	Abdoulaye Ba	23	2	22	2	1	0
14	DF	(Azerbaijan) AZE	Bəxtiyar Həsənalızadə	22	2	16+3	1	3	1
15	MF	(Brazil) BRA	Christian	21	1	14+5	1	2	0
16	GK	(Azerbaijan) AZE	Rustam Samiqullin	1	0	1	0	0	0
17	DF	(Azerbaijan) AZE	Tellur Mutallimov	31	0	6+22	0	2+1	0
18	FW	(Georgia (country)) GEO	Davit Volkovi	38	12	23+12	10	1+2	2
19	DF	(Spain) ESP	Jon Irazabal	31	2	29+1	2	1	0
20	MF	(Germany) GER	Joy-Lance Mickels	38	17	35	17	3	0
21	MF	(Azerbaijan) AZE	Ildar Alekperov	21	0	0+18	0	1+2	0
22	MF	(Azerbaijan) AZE	Seymur Mammadov	3	1	0+2	1	0+1	0
29	MF	(Azerbaijan) AZE	Jeyhun Nuriyev	26	2	3+20	2	2+1	0
33	FW	(Azerbaijan) AZE	Jamal Jafarov	5	0	0+4	0	0+1	0
77	MF	(Azerbaijan) AZE	Namiq Ələsgərov	24	2	9+14	2	0+1	0
94	GK	(Azerbaijan) AZE	Nijat Mehbaliyev	3	0	1	0	2	0
99	FW	(Nigeria) NGR	Emmanuel Apeh	37	11	13+21	8	2+1	3
Players away on loan:
5	DF	(Azerbaijan) AZE	Idris Ingilabli	1	0	0	0	0+1	0
6	MF	(Azerbaijan) AZE	Abdulla Khaybulayev	5	0	0+4	0	1	0
Players who left Sabah during the season:

=== Goal scorers ===
Place	Position	Nation	Number	Name	Premier League	Azerbaijan Cup	Total
1	MF	(Germany)	20	Joy-Lance Mickels	17	0	17
2	MF	(Ukraine)	8	Oleksiy Kashchuk	15	0	16
3	FW	(Georgia (country))	18	Davit Volkovi	10	2	12
4	FW	(Nigeria)	99	Emmanuel Apeh	8	3	11
5	FW	(Azerbaijan)	9	Anatoliy Nuriyev	4	0	4
5	MF	(Spain)	11	Cristian Ceballos	3	1	4
7	MF	(Azerbaijan)	10	Aleksey Isayev	3	0	3
8	DF	(Senegal)	13	Abdoulaye Ba	2	0	2
8	MF	(Azerbaijan)	77	Namiq Ələsgərov	2	0	2
8	MF	(Azerbaijan)	4	Elvin Camalov	2	0	2
8	FW	(Azerbaijan)	29	Jeyhun Nuriyev	2	0	2
8	DF	(Spain)	19	Jon Irazabal	2	0	2
8	DF	(Azerbaijan)	14	Bəxtiyar Həsənalızadə	1	1	2
14	MF	(Azerbaijan)	22	Seymur Mammadov	1	0	1
14	MF	(Brazil)	15	Christian	1	0	1
14				Own goal	1	0	1
				TOTALS	73	7	80

=== Clean sheets ===
Place	Position	Nation	Number	Name	Premier League	Azerbaijan Cup	Total
1	GK	(Azerbaijan)	12	Yusif Imanov	19	0	19
2	GK	(Azerbaijan)	94	Nijat Mehbaliyev	1	1	2
3	GK	(Azerbaijan)	16	Rustam Samiqullin	1	0	1
				TOTALS	21	1	22

=== Disciplinary record ===
Number	Nation	Position	Name	Premier League		Azerbaijan Cup		Total	
Number	Nation	Position	Name	Yellow card	Red card	Yellow card	Red card	Yellow card	Red card
2	(Azerbaijan)	DF	Amin Seydiyev	10	0	0	0	10	0
4	(Azerbaijan)	MF	Elvin Camalov	10	0	2	0	12	0
7	(Bosnia and Herzegovina)	DF	Bojan Letić	7	0	1	0	8	0
8	(Ukraine)	MF	Oleksiy Kashchuk	1	0	0	0	1	0
9	(Azerbaijan)	FW	Anatoliy Nuriyev	6	1	0	0	6	1
10	(Azerbaijan)	MF	Aleksey Isayev	10	0	0	0	10	0
11	(Spain)	MF	Cristian Ceballos	4	1	0	0	4	1
13	(Senegal)	DF	Abdoulaye Ba	9	1	1	0	10	1
14	(Azerbaijan)	DF	Bəxtiyar Həsənalızadə	2	0	0	0	2	0
17	(Azerbaijan)	DF	Tellur Mutallimov	3	0	0	0	3	0
18	(Georgia (country))	FW	Davit Volkovi	3	0	0	0	3	0
19	(Spain)	DF	Jon Irazabal	3	2	0	0	3	2
20	(Germany)	MF	Joy-Lance Mickels	3	0	2	0	5	0
21	(Azerbaijan)	MF	Ildar Alekperov	1	0	0	0	1	0
22	(Azerbaijan)	MF	Seymur Mammadov	1	0	0	0	1	0
29	(Azerbaijan)	MF	Jeyhun Nuriyev	4	1	0	0	4	1
77	(Azerbaijan)	MF	Namiq Ələsgərov	3	0	0	0	3	0
94	(Azerbaijan)	GK	Nijat Mehbaliyev	0	0	0	1	0	1
99	(Nigeria)	FW	Emmanuel Apeh	3	0	0	0	3	0
Players away from Sabah on loan:
6	(Azerbaijan)	MF	Abdulla Khaybulayev	1	0	0	0	1	0
Players who left Sabah during the season:
			TOTALS	84	6	6	1	90	7
