= Elvin Camalov =

Azerbaijani footballer (born 1995)

Personal information
- Full name: Elvin Sərkər oğlu Camalov
- Date of birth: 4 February 1995 (age 31)
- Place of birth: Qakh, Azerbaijan
- Height: 1.74 m (5 ft 9 in)
- Position: Defensive midfielder

Team information
- Current team: Qabala
- Number: 4

Youth career
- 2008–2009: Simurq
- 2009–2012: Gabala

Senior career*
Years	Team	Apps	(Gls)
2013–2019	Gabala	113	(0)
2019–2021	Zira	43	(0)
2021–2025	Sabah	98	(2)
2025–2026	Neftçi	25	(1)
2026–	Qabala	6	(0)

International career^{‡}
2010–2011	Azerbaijan U17	4	(0)
2013–2014	Azerbaijan U19	3	(0)
2014–2016	Azerbaijan U21	7	(0)
2019–	Azerbaijan	21	(0)
Medal record
Men's football
Representing Azerbaijan
Islamic Solidarity Games
Winner	2017 Azerbaijan
- * Club domestic league appearances and goals as of 13 November 2026 ‡ National team caps and goals as of 18 September 2026

Elvin Sərkər oğlu Camalov (born 4 February 1995) is an Azerbaijani footballer who plays as a midfielder for Qabala and the Azerbaijan national team.

== Career ==
=== Club ===
On 3 June 2019, Zira announced the signing of Camalov on a two-year contract from Gabala.

On 27 May 2021, Sabah announced the signing of Camalov on a two-year contract from Zira.

On 22 January 2025, Neftçi announced the signing of Camalov from Sabah on an 18-month contract, with the option of an additional year. On 14 September 2026, Neftçi announced that their contract with Camalov had been terminated by mutual agreement.

On 16 September 2026, Qabala announced the return of Camalov to the club on a two-year contract.

=== International ===
Camalov made his international debut for Azerbaijan on 19 November 2019 in a UEFA Euro 2020 qualifying match against Slovakia.

== Career statistics ==
=== Club ===
As of match played 7 November 2026

Appearances and goals by club, season and competition
Club	Season	League			National Cup		Continental		Other		Total	
Club	Season	Division	Apps	Goals	Apps	Goals	Apps	Goals	Apps	Goals	Apps	Goals
Gabala	2013–14	Azerbaijan Premier League	1	0	1	0	-		-		2	0
Gabala	2014–15	Azerbaijan Premier League	29	0	3	0	2	0	-		34	0
Gabala	2015–16	Azerbaijan Premier League	29	0	5	0	3	0	-		37	0
Gabala	2016–17	Azerbaijan Premier League	13	0	2	0	5	0	-		20	0
Gabala	2017–18	Azerbaijan Premier League	18	0	2	0	1	0	-		21	0
Gabala	2018–19	Azerbaijan Premier League	21	0	5	0	1	0	-		27	0
Gabala	Total		111	0	18	0	12	0	-	-	141	0
Zira	2019–20	Azerbaijan Premier League	18	0	2	0	–		–		20	0
Zira	2020–21	Azerbaijan Premier League	25	0	4	0	–		–		29	0
Zira	Total		43	0	6	0	-	-	-	-	49	0
Sabah	2021–22	Azerbaijan Premier League	26	0	3	0	–		–		29	0
Sabah	2022–23	Azerbaijan Premier League	33	2	2	0	–		–		35	2
Sabah	2023–24	Azerbaijan Premier League	26	0	3	0	2	0	–		31	0
Sabah	2024–25	Azerbaijan Premier League	13	0	1	0	4	0	–		18	0
Sabah	Total		98	0	9	0	6	0	-	-	113	2
Neftçi	2024–25	Azerbaijan Premier League	13	1	3	0	–		–		16	1
Neftçi	2025–26	Azerbaijan Premier League	11	0	1	0	–		–		12	0
Neftçi	2026–27	Azerbaijan Premier League	1	0	0	0	0	0	–		1	0
Neftçi	Total		25	1	4	0	0	0	-	-	29	1
Qabala	2026–27	Azerbaijan Premier League	6	0	1	0	–		–		7	0
Career total			283	3	38	0	18	0	-	-	339	3

=== International ===
As of match played 22 March 2025

Azerbaijan
Year	Apps	Goals
2019	1	0
2020	5	0
2021	0	0
2022	3	0
2023	6	0
2024	5	0
2025	1	0
Total	21	0
