= Joy-Lance Mickels =

Rwandan footballer

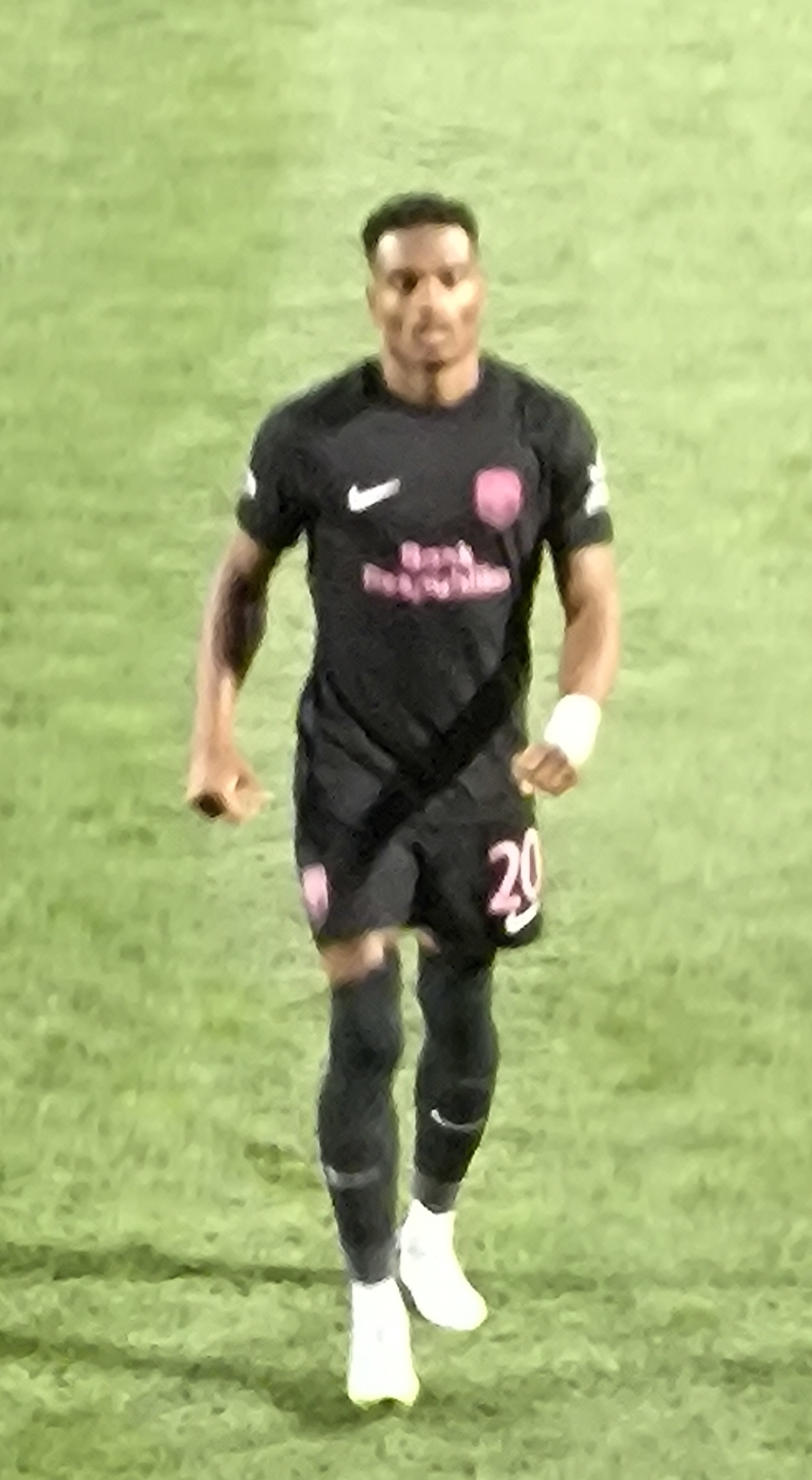
- Mickels with Sabah in 2025

Personal information
- Date of birth: 29 March 1994 (age 32)
- Place of birth: Siegburg, Germany
- Height: 1.81 m (5 ft 11 in)
- Position: Winger

Team information
- Current team: Sabah
- Number: 20

Youth career
- 1998–2005: VSF Amern
- 2005–2013: Borussia Mönchengladbach

Senior career*
Years	Team	Apps	(Gls)
2013–2014	Borussia Mönchengladbach II	5	(0)
2014–2016	Schalke 04 II	43	(9)
2016–2017	Alemannia Aachen	19	(5)
2017–2020	Wacker Nordhausen	61	(18)
2020	Carl Zeiss Jena	11	(0)
2020–2021	MVV	27	(7)
2021–2023	Sabah	61	(29)
2023–2024	Al Faisaly	30	(6)
2024–	Sabah	56	(33)

International career^{‡}
2026–	Rwanda	3	(1)
Medal record
Representing Rwanda
Men's football
FIFA Series
Winner	2026 Rwanda
- * Club domestic league appearances and goals as of 18:01, 20 October 2026 (UTC) ‡ National team caps and goals as of 25 September 2026

Joy-Lance Mickels (born 29 March 1994) is a professional footballer who plays as a winger for Azerbaijan Premier League club Sabah. Born in Germany, he plays for the Rwanda national team.

== Club career ==
Mickels started playing football at VSF Amern at the age of four and was then a part of the Borussia Mönchengladbach youth academy for eight years from 2005. In the 2012–13 season for the Borussia Mönchengladbach U19 team, Mickels, who had his best season yet with 17 goals and three assists, reached the semi-finals of the DFB Junior Cup, where they were eliminated on penalties against 1. FC Kaiserslautern. During the season, he also made his first appearance for the reserve team, Borussia Mönchengladbach II, in the fourth-tier Regionalliga, where he began playing permanently in the summer of 2013.

A year later, Mickels moved to Schalke 04, where he played for the reserve team, Schalke 04 II. During his two seasons there, he scored nine goals and made three assists in 43 Regionalliga games. Mickels continued his career in the Regionalliga West for the 2016–17 season at Alemannia Aachen.

In the summer of 2017, Mickels moved to Regionalliga Nordost club Wacker Nordhausen. In his first season, he became a regular starter, and with six goals and twelve assists had a large share in the club finishing runners-up. The following season, Wacker finished in third place in the league table and won the Thuringian Cup. Mickels largely missed the first half of the 2019–20 season due to a knee injury and then made two appearances for the reserve side in the NOFV-Oberliga.

After Wacker Nordhausen filed for bankruptcy and many players left the club, Mickels moved to 3. Liga club Carl Zeiss Jena in late January 2020, with whom he received a contract valid until the end of the season. In pre-season, he had already successfully completed a trial practice session with 2. Bundesliga club Dynamo Dresden. In various offensive positions, Mickels remained goal-less and suffered relegation with Carl Zeiss Jena to the Regionalliga; bottom of the table.

After Mickels' contract was not renewed, he was signed by the Dutch second-tier Eerste Divisie club MVV Maastricht in late August 2020 and signed a one-year contract.

On 10 July 2022, Mickels signed a two-year contract with Azerbaijan Premier League club Sabah.

On 14 August 2023, Mickels joined Saudi First Division club Al-Faisaly.

== International career ==
On 16 March 2026, Mickels was named in Rwanda's provisional 31-man squad for their 2026 FIFA Series matches against Grenada and then either Kenya or Estonia, alongside his twin-brother Joy-Slayd and younger brother Leroy-Jacques. Mickels scored on his debut for Rwanda against Grenada on 27 March 2026.

== Personal life ==
Joy-Lance's twin brother Joy-Slayd is also a professional footballer, as is their younger brother Leroy-Jacques (b. 1995). The three brothers, whose father is from Rwanda and mother come from the DR Congo, played together at the under-19 level for Borussia Mönchengladbach.

== Career statistics ==
=== Club ===
As of match played 17 October 2026

Appearances and goals by club, season and competition
Club	Season	League			National cup (Note: Includes KNVB Cup, King's Cup, Azerbaijan Cup)		Continental		Total	
Club	Season	Division	Apps	Goals	Apps	Goals	Apps	Goals	Apps	Goals
MVV	2020–21	Eerste Divisie	27	7	1	0	–		28	7
Sabah	2021–22	Azerbaijan Premier League	25	11	3	3	–		28	14
Sabah	2022–23	Azerbaijan Premier League	35	17	2	0	–		37	17
Sabah	2023–24	Azerbaijan Premier League	1	1	0	0	2 (Note: Appearances in UEFA Conference League)	1	3	2
Sabah	Total		61	29	5	3	2	1	68	33
Al Faisaly	2023–24	Saudi First Division League	30	6	3	1	–		33	7
Sabah	2024–25	Azerbaijan Premier League	24	9	6	1	4	1	34	11
Sabah	2025–26	Azerbaijan Premier League	25	19	5	3	6 (Note: Two appearances and three goals in UEFA Europa League, four appearances and three goals in UEFA Conference League)	6	36	28
Sabah	2026–27	Azerbaijan Premier League	7	5	0	0	10 (Note: Appearances in UEFA Champions League)	5	17	10
Sabah	Total		56	33	11	4	20	12	87	49
Career total			174	75	20	8	22	13	216	96

=== International ===
Scores and results list Rwanda's goal tally first.

No.	Date	Venue	Opponent	Score	Result	Competition
1.	25 September 2026	Amahoro Stadium, Kigali, Rwanda	Liberia	3–1	3–1	2027 Africa Cup of Nations qualification

== Honours ==
Wacker Nordhausen

- Thuringian Cup: 2019

Sabah

- Azerbaijan Premier League: 2025–26
- Azerbaijan Cup: 2024–25, 2025–26

Individual

- Azerbaijan Premier League top goalscorer: 2025–26
