= Aleksey Isayev =

Azerbaijani footballer (born 1995)

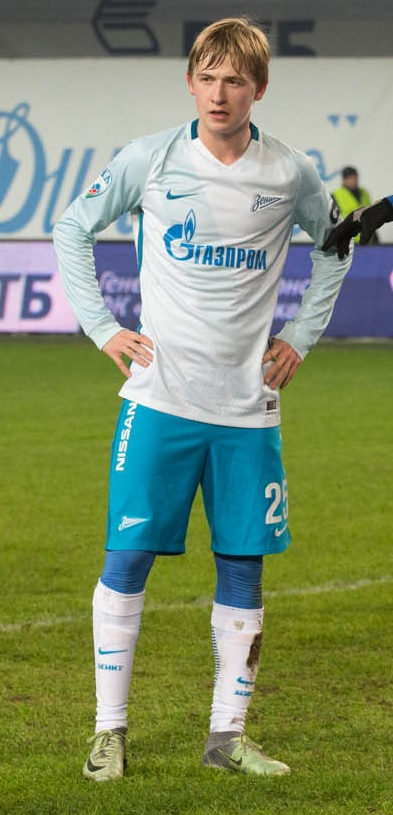
- Isayev with Zenit-2 in 2016

Personal information
- Full name: Aleksey Aleksandrovich Isayev
- Date of birth: 9 November 1995 (age 31)
- Place of birth: Krasnoyarsk, Russia
- Height: 1.77 m (5 ft 10 in)
- Position: Midfielder

Team information
- Current team: Sabah
- Number: 10

Senior career*
Years	Team	Apps	(Gls)
2014–2016	Yenisey	35	(3)
2016–2018	Zenit St. Petersburg	0	(0)
2016–2017	→ Zenit-2 St. Petersburg (loan)	24	(0)
2017–2018	→ Yenisey (loan)	25	(2)
2018–2020	Sumgayit	38	(0)
2020–2024	Sabah	98	(11)
2024–2025	Qarabağ	44	(1)
2025–	Sabah	21	(3)

International career^{‡}
2021–	Azerbaijan	37	(1)
- * Club domestic league appearances and goals as of 22 June 2026 ‡ National team caps and goals as of 15 November 2026

Aleksey Aleksandrovich Isayev (Azerbaijani: Aleksey Aleksandroviç İsayev; Russian: Алексей Александрович Исаев; born 9 November 1995) is a professional footballer who plays as a midfielder for Azerbaijan Premier League club Sabah. Born in Russia, he plays for the Azerbaijan national team.

== Club career ==
He made his debut in the Russian Football National League for FC Yenisey Krasnoyarsk on 30 September 2014 in a game against FC Dynamo Saint Petersburg.

On 26 June 2018, Isayev signed a two-year contract with Sumgayit.

On 9 July 2020, Isayev signed a three-year contract with Sabah.

On 4 January 2024, Isayev moved from Sabah to Qarabağ, signing a 3.5-year contract.

== International career ==
He made his debut for Azerbaijan national football team on 24 March 2021 in a World Cup qualifier against Portugal.

== Career statistics ==
=== Club ===
As of match played 27 April 2025

Appearances and goals by club, season and competition
Club	Season	League			National cup (Note: Includes Russian Cup, Azerbaijan Cup)		Continental		Other		Total	
Club	Season	Division	Apps	Goals	Apps	Goals	Apps	Goals	Apps	Goals	Apps	Goals
Yenisey Krasnoyarsk	2014–15	Russian FNL	10	0	0	0	—		—		10	0
Yenisey Krasnoyarsk	2015–16	Russian FNL	19	2	0	0	—		—		19	2
Yenisey Krasnoyarsk	2016–17	Russian FNL	6	1	1	0	—		—		7	1
Yenisey Krasnoyarsk	Total		35	3	1	0	—		—		36	1
Zenit St.Petersburg	2016–17	Russian Premier League	0	0	0	0	0	0	0	0	0	0
Zenit St.Petersburg	2017–18	Russian Premier League	0	0	0	0	0	0	—		0	0
Zenit St.Petersburg	Total		0	0	0	0	0	0	0	0	0	0
Zenit-2 St.Petersburg	2016–17	Russian FNL	24	0	—		—		—		24	0
Yenisey Krasnoyarsk (loan)	2017–18	Russian FNL	25	2	2	1	—		—		27	3
Sumgayit	2018–19	Azerbaijan Premier League	27	0	4	0	—		—		31	0
Sumgayit	2019–20	Azerbaijan Premier League	11	0	1	0	—		—		12	0
Sumgayit	Total		38	0	5	0	—		—		43	0
Sabah	2020–21	Azerbaijan Premier League	20	1	0	0	—		—		20	1
Sabah	2021–22	Azerbaijan Premier League	27	6	3	0	—		—		30	6
Sabah	2022–23	Azerbaijan Premier League	34	3	2	0	—		—		36	3
Sabah	2023–24	Azerbaijan Premier League	17	1	1	0	4 (Note: Appearances in UEFA Europa Conference League)	1	—		22	2
Sabah	Total		98	11	6	0	4	1	—		108	12
Qarabağ	2023–24	Azerbaijan Premier League	17	0	3	0	2 (Note: Appearances in UEFA Europa League)	0	—		22	0
Qarabağ	2024–25	Azerbaijan Premier League	25	1	4	0	3 (Note: Two appearances in UEFA Champions League, one appearance in UEFA Europa League)	0	—		32	1
Qarabağ	Total		42	1	7	0	5	0	—		54	1
Career total			262	17	21	1	9	1	—		292	19

=== International ===
As of match played 22 March 2025

Appearances and goals by national team and year
National team	Year	Apps	Goals
Azerbaijan	2021	4	0
Azerbaijan	2022	7	1
Azerbaijan	2023	9	0
Azerbaijan	2024	8	0
Azerbaijan	2025	1	0
Total		29	1

Scores and results list Azerbaijan's goal tally first, score column indicates score after each Isayev goal.

List of international goals scored by Aleksey Isayev
No.	Date	Venue	Opponent	Score	Result	Competition
1	16 November 2022	Zimbru Stadium, Chişinău, Moldova	Moldova	2–0	2–1	Friendly

== Honours ==
Sabah

- Azerbaijan Premier League: 2025–26
- Azerbaijan Cup: 2025–26
