= Juan Cámara =

Spanish footballer

Personal information
- Full name: Juan del Carmen Cámara Mesa
- Date of birth: 13 February 1994 (age 32)
- Place of birth: Jaén, Spain
- Height: 1.84 m (6 ft 0 in)
- Position: Winger

Team information
- Current team: Inter d'Escaldes
- Number: 7

Youth career
- 2006–2011: Villarreal

Senior career*
Years	Team	Apps	(Gls)
2011–2012	Villarreal C	34	(8)
2012–2014	Villarreal B	70	(15)
2014–2016	Barcelona B	61	(12)
2016–2018	Barcelona	0	(0)
2016–2017	→ Girona (loan)	3	(0)
2017–2018	→ Reus (loan)	17	(0)
2018–2019	Miedź Legnica	27	(3)
2019–2023	Jagiellonia Białystok	35	(2)
2020–2021	→ Dinamo București (loan)	12	(2)
2021	→ Universitatea Craiova (loan)	12	(0)
2021–2022	→ Sabah (loan)	19	(4)
2022–2023	Jagiellonia Białystok II	3	(0)
2023–2024	Zagłębie Sosnowiec	12	(0)
2024	Badalona Futur	9	(0)
2024–2025	Jaén	27	(4)
2025–	Inter d'Escaldes	19	(6)

International career
2009	Spain U16	4	(0)
2010	Spain U17	4	(0)
- * Club domestic league appearances and goals as of 15 June 2026

Juan del Carmen Cámara Mesa (Spanish pronunciation: [ˈxwaŋ ˈkamaɾa]; (Note: In isolation, Juan is pronounced [ˈxwan].) born 13 February 1994) is a Spanish professional footballer who plays as a winger for Andorran club Inter Club d'Escaldes.

== Club career ==
Born in Jaén, Andalusia as the son of a goalkeeper for Real Jaén, Cámara finished his youth career with Villarreal CF. On 3 June 2012, the very last day of the season in the Segunda División, he made his debut as a professional, playing 27 minutes for their reserves in a 0–1 home defeat against Deportivo de La Coruña.

On 3 July 2014, Cámara joined another reserve team, FC Barcelona Atlètic also of the second division. He scored his first professional goal on 28 September, netting his side's second in a 3–3 draw away to RCD Mallorca. He finished his first year with six goals in 30 matches, including a brace in a 3–1 home win over Recreativo de Huelva on 18 January 2015.

Cámara was first included in FC Barcelona's main squad on 23 August 2015, remaining an unused substitute in their 1–0 La Liga victory at Athletic Bilbao which was the season's opener. He first appeared in the UEFA Champions League on 9 December, replacing Jordi Alba for the last 16 minutes of an eventual 1–1 away draw with Bayer 04 Leverkusen as the Spaniards had already secured the first place in their group.

On 10 February 2016, Cámara came on for Ivan Rakitić in the 76th minute of a 1–1 away draw against Valencia CF in the second leg of the semi-finals of the Copa del Rey, providing the assist for Wilfrid Kaptoum's goal. This scoreline also served to extend Barcelona's unbeaten run to 29 games, breaking the previous record of 28 set under Pep Guardiola in the 2010–11 campaign.

On 31 August 2016, Cámara was loaned to division two club Girona FC for one year. After appearing rarely in an eventual promotion, he moved to CF Reus Deportiu in the same tier on 10 August 2017, also on a one-year loan deal.

On 9 August 2018, free agent Cámara moved abroad for the first time in his career, after signing a three-year contract with Miedź Legnica in the Polish Ekstraklasa. The following 31 May, he joined Jagiellonia Białystok of the same league on a four-year deal.

Cámara spent the following seasons on loan, at Romanian clubs FC Dinamo București and CS Universitatea Craiova as well as Sabah FC in the Azerbaijan Premier League. After his link with Jagiellonia expired, he remained in Poland on a one-year deal with I liga side Zagłębie Sosnowiec on 18 July 2023.

After terminating his contract with Zagłębie in early 2024, Cámara returned to Spain and joined Segunda Federación club CF Badalona Futur.

== Career statistics ==
As of 10 February 2016

Appearances and goals by club, season and competition
Club	Season	League		Cup		Europe		Other		Total	
Club	Season	Apps	Goals	Apps	Goals	Apps	Goals	Apps	Goals	Apps	Goals
Villarreal B	2011–12	1	0	—		—		—		1	0
Villarreal B	2012–13	33	6	—		—		—		33	6
Villarreal B	2013–14	36	9	—		—		—		36	9
Villarreal B	Total	70	15	0	0	0	0	0	0	70	15
Barcelona B	2014–15	30	6	—		—		—		30	6
Barcelona B	2015–16	18	5	—		—		—		18	5
Barcelona B	Total	48	11	0	0	0	0	0	0	48	11
Barcelona	2015–16	0	0	1	0	1 (Note: Appearances in UEFA Champions League)	0	—		2	0
Career total		118	26	1	0	1	0	0	0	120	26

== Honours ==
Barcelona

- Copa del Rey: 2015–16

Universitatea Craiova

- Cupa României: 2020–21
