= Bojan Letić =

Bosnian footballer (born 1992)

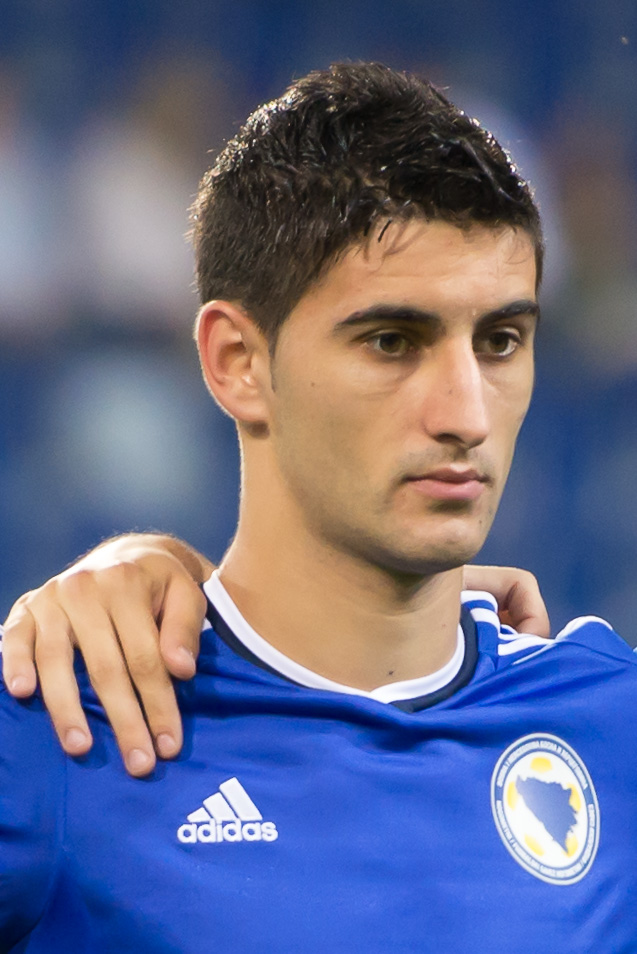
- Letić with Bosnia and Herzegovina U21 in 2014

Personal information
- Full name: Bojan Letić
- Date of birth: 21 December 1992 (age 33)
- Place of birth: Brčko, Bosnia and Herzegovina
- Height: 1.84 m (6 ft 1/2 in)
- Position: Left-back

Team information
- Current team: Araz-Naxçıvan

Senior career*
Years	Team	Apps	(Gls)
2011–2012	Kozara Gradiška	15	(2)
2012–2013	Borac Šamac	10	(0)
2013–2014	Velež Mostar	42	(0)
2014–2017	Žilina	57	(1)
2017–2019	Karviná	33	(0)
2019	Sarajevo	13	(0)
2020	Radnički Niš	10	(0)
2020–2022	Mirandés	24	(0)
2022–2026	Sabah	104	(5)
2026	Sloga Doboj	10	(0)
2026–	Araz-Naxçıvan	0	(0)

International career
2013–2014	Bosnia and Herzegovina U21	6	(0)
- * Club domestic league appearances and goals as of 6 January 2026

Bojan Letić (born 21 December 1992) is a Bosnian professional footballer who plays as a left-back, for Azerbaijani club Araz-Naxçıvan.

== Club career ==
=== Early career ===
Letić started off his career at Kozara Gradiška where he played in the 2011–12 Bosnian Premier League season. After Kozara, he played for a short time at Borac Šamac in the First League of RS, before signing with Velež Mostar where he spent a year and a half.

=== Žilina ===
On 17 July 2014, Slovak Super Liga club Žilina announced that they had reached an agreement for the transfer of Letić, who signed a three-year deal. He made his professional debut for Žilina against Košice on 20 July 2014. While at Žilina, he simultaneously played for the second team of Žilina B in the 2. Liga.

In the 2016–17 Slovak Super Liga season, Letić won the league title with Žilina and won his first professional trophy. In August 2017, he left Žilina.

=== Karviná ===
Shortly after leaving Žilina, on 17 August 2017, Letić signed with Czech First League club Karviná.

He made his debut for Karviná on 26 August 2017, in a 0–1 home league loss against Slovan Liberec, coming in as a 77th-minute substitute for former teammate Peter Štepanovský.

It was announced that Letić was leaving Karviná in June 2019.

=== Sarajevo ===
On 2 July 2019, Letić signed a two-year contract with Bosnian Premier League club Sarajevo. He made his official debut for Sarajevo on 28 July 2019, in a 0–0 away league draw against Čelik Zenica. Letić decided to terminate his contract and leave Sarajevo on 16 January 2020.

=== Mirandés ===
On 6 August 2020, after a short stint at FK Radnički Niš, Letić agreed to a two-year deal with CD Mirandés in the Spanish Segunda División. On 31 January 2022, he terminated his contract with the club.

=== Sabah ===
On 18 February 2022, Sabah announced the signing of Letić on a contract until the end of the 2021–22 season. On 5 January 2026, Sabah announced that Letić had left the club after his contract was terminated by mutual consent.

=== Araz-Naxçıvan ===
On 10 August 2026, Azerbaijan Premier League club Araz-Naxçıvan announced the signing of Letić.

== International career ==
Letić played for the Bosnia and Herzegovina U21 national team between 2013 and 2014, earning a total of 6 appearances.

== Honours ==
Žilina

- Slovak Super Liga: 2016–17

Sabah

- Azerbaijan Cup: 2024–25
