= Lucas Rangel =

Brazilian footballer (born 1994)

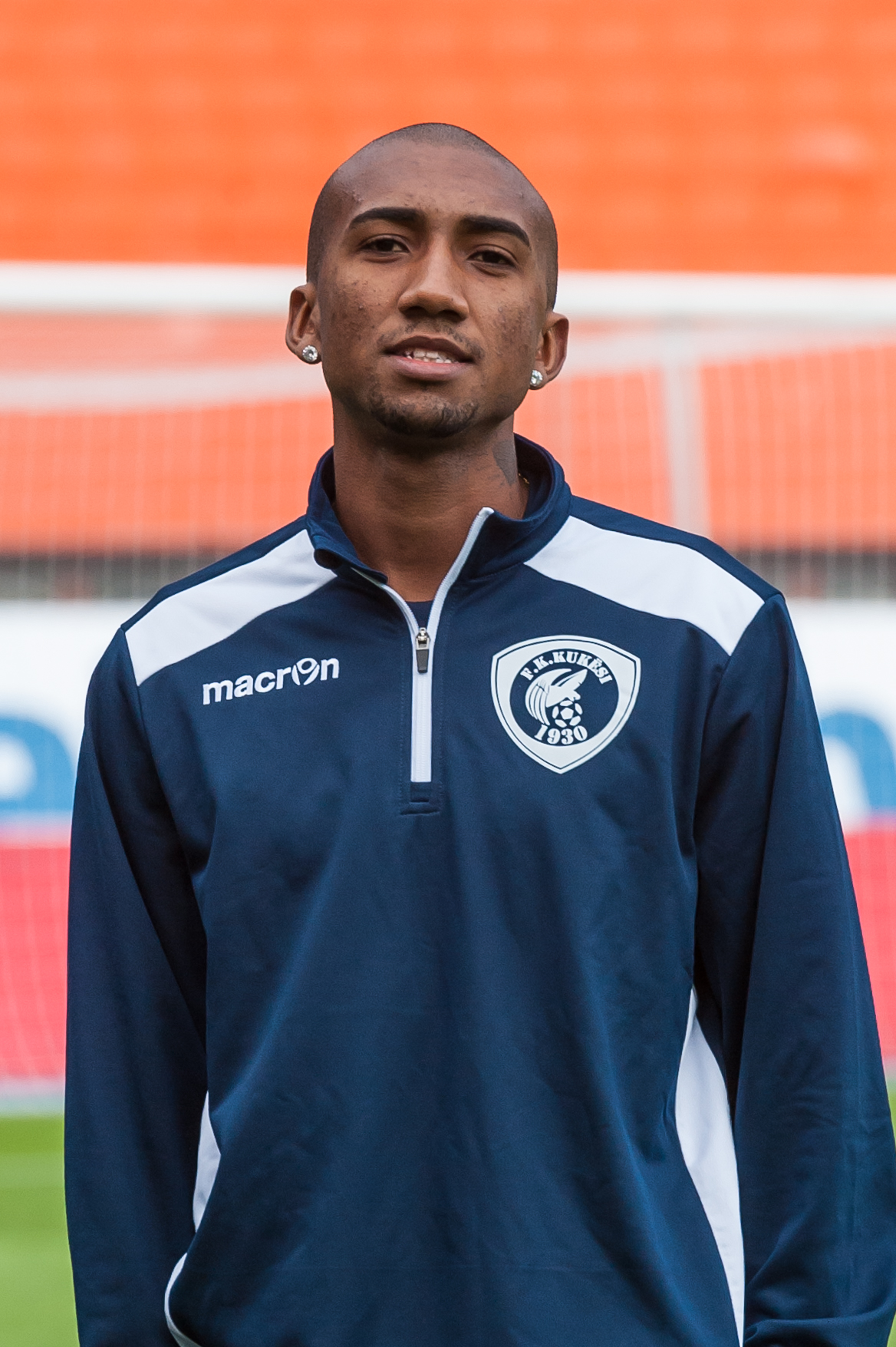

Personal information
- Full name: Lucas Rangel Nunes Gonçalves
- Date of birth: 29 December 1994 (age 31)
- Place of birth: Alvorada, Brazil
- Position: Forward

Team information
- Current team: KTP
- Number: 22

Senior career*
Years	Team	Apps	(Gls)
2015	Grêmio Barueri		
2015	Foz do Iguaçu	2	(0)
2016	Itumbiara		
2016–2017	Kukësi	18	(1)
2017–2018	Kapfenberger SV	30	(9)
2018–2020	KuPS	41	(17)
2021	Adana Demirspor	7	(1)
2021	KuPS	12	(2)
2021–2022	Vorskla Poltava	12	(4)
2022	→ Sabah (loan)	8	(2)
2022–2023	Riga FC	22	(5)
2023–2024	Kolos Kovalivka	12	(1)
2024	KuPS	6	(1)
2025–2026	KTP	17	(7)
2026	Capital CF	4	(0)
2026–	SJK	14	(1)
2026–	KTP	7	(5)
- * Club domestic league appearances and goals as of 7 November 2026

Lucas Rangel Nunes Gonçalves (born 29 December 1994), commonly known as Lucas Rangel, is a Brazilian footballer who plays as a forward for Ykkösliiga club KTP.

== Career ==
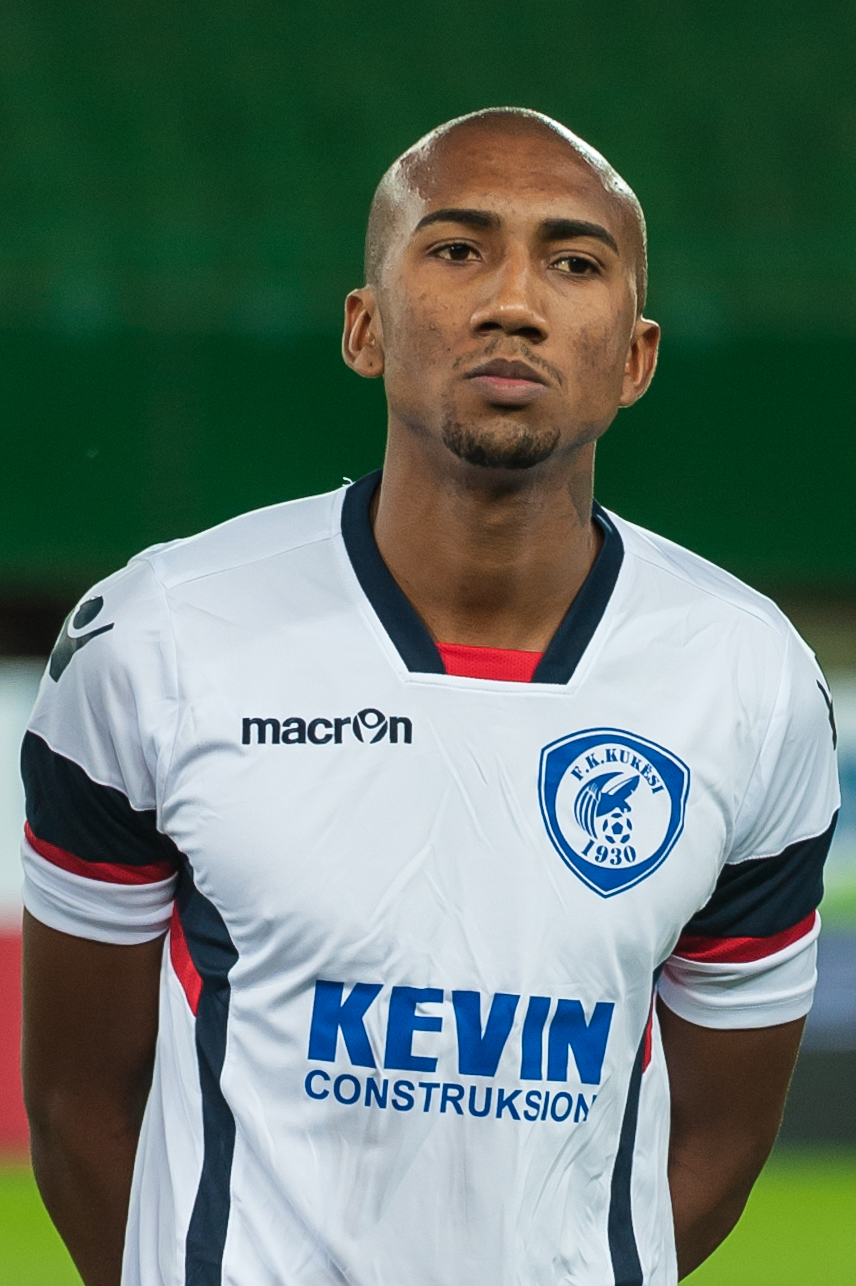
Rangel playing for Kukësi in 2016

On 3 July 2018, Rangel signed with Finnish Veikkausliiga club Kuopion Palloseura (KuPS), on a deal until the end of 2019, with an option to extend. Jani Honkavaara, the head coach of KuPS, revealed that the club had tried to acquire Rangel already earlier before the season. They won the Finnish Championship title in the 2019 season.

After a short stint with Adana Demirspor in 2021, Rangel returned to KuPS on 21 April 2021. On 13 August, Rangel scored a hat-trick for KuPS against Astana, in the third round of the UECL qualifiers, helping his team to advance by a 5–4 aggregate win, after having already trailed 3–1.

On 31 August 2021, Rangel was acquired by Ukrainian Premier League side Vorskla Poltava for an undisclosed fee, signing a two-year deal with the club.

On 21 March 2022, after the Russian Invasion of Ukraine had started, Sabah announced the signing of Rangel on loan until the end of the season from Vorskla Poltava.

On 18 July 2022, Riga FC announced the signing of Rangel.

After a stint in Ukrainian Premier League with Kolos Kovalivka, on 26 August 2024, Rangel returned to Finland and signed with his former club KuPS on a deal for the rest of the season with an option for 2025. He scored a goal in his second appearance for the club, in a 3–1 home win over Vaasan Palloseura (VPS) in Veikkausliiga. At the end of the 2024 season, Rangel and KuPS won the club's first-ever double, by winning the 2024 Finnish Cup and the 2024 Veikkausliiga titles.

On 28 June 2025, Kotkan Työväen Palloilijat (KTP) announced the signing of Rangel.

On 25 March 2026, SJK Seinäjoki announced the signing of Rangel.

== Personal life ==
In March 2022, during the Russian invasion of Ukraine, Rangel made international news for his participation in the evacuation of the mother-in-law of social media influencer Anderson Dias.

== Career statistics ==
As of 21 July 2026

Appearances and goals by club, season and competition
Club	Season	League			State League		Cup (Note: Includes Albanian Cup, Suomen Cup, Ukrainian Cup and Suomen Cup)		Continental		Total	
Club	Season	Division	Apps	Goals	Apps	Goals	Apps	Goals	Apps	Goals	Apps	Goals
Grêmio Barueri	2015		–		14 (Note: Includes Campeonato Paulista Série A3)	10	–		–		14	10
Foz do Iguaçu	2015	Série D	2	0	–		–		–		2	0
Itumbiara	2016		–		11 (Note: Includes Campeonato Goiano)	2	–		–		11	2
Kukësi	2016–17	Kategoria Superiore	19	1	–		5	1	4 (Note: Includes UEFA Europa League)	1	28	3
Kapfenberger SV	2017–18	Austrian 2. Liga	30	9	–		1	0	–		31	9
KuPS	2018	Veikkausliiga	14	5	–		–		2	0	16	5
KuPS	2019	Veikkausliiga	16	8	–		4	1	4	1	24	10
KuPS	2020	Veikkausliiga	13	4	–		6	3	4 (Note: Includes UEFA Champions League and UEFA Europa League)	1	23	8
KuPS	Total		43	17	–	–	10	4	10	2	63	23
Adana Demirspor	2020–21	TFF 1. Lig	7	1	–		–		–		7	1
KuPS	2021	Veikkausliiga	12	2	–		–		8 (Note: Includes UEFA Europa Conference League)	5	20	7
Vorskla Poltava	2021–22	Ukrainian Premier League	12	4	–		1	0	0	0	13	4
Sabah (loan)	2021–22	Azerbaijan Premier League	8	2	–		–		–		8	2
Riga FC	2022	Virslīga	14	4	–		–		4	0	18	4
Riga FC	2023	Virslīga	8	1	–		–		1	0	9	1
Riga FC	Total		22	5	–	–	–	–	5	0	27	5
Riga FC II	2023	Latvian First League	1	1	–		–		–		1	1
Kolos Kovalivka	2023–24	Ukrainian Premier League	12	1	–		–		–		12	1
KuPS	2024	Veikkausliiga	6	1	–		1	0	0	0	7	1
KTP	2025	Veikkausliiga	17	7	–		–		–		17	7
Capital CF	2026	Série D	–		4 (Note: Includes Campeonato Brasiliense)	0	–		–		4	0
SJK	2026	Veikkausliiga	14	1	–		2	1	–		16	2
Career total			205	52	29	12	20	6	27	8	281	78

== Honours ==
KuPS

- Veikkausliiga: 2019, 2024
- Veikkausliiga runner-up: 2021
- Finnish Cup: 2024
