= Špiro Peričić =

Croatian footballer (born 1993)

Personal information
- Date of birth: 8 October 1993 (age 33)
- Place of birth: Split, Croatia
- Height: 1.84 m (6 ft 1/2 in)
- Position: Defender

Team information
- Current team: Dugopolje

Youth career
- Junak Sinj
- Hajduk Split

Senior career*
| Years | Team | Apps | (Gls) |
| 2012–2014 | Hajduk Split | 0 | (0) |
| 2012–2013 | → Primorac 1929 (loan) | 28 | (1) |
| 2013 | → Solin (loan) | 9 | (1) |
| 2014 | → Dugopolje (loan) | 8 | (0) |
| 2014–2015 | Dugopolje | 14 | (2) |
| 2015–2016 | Slaven Belupo | 3 | (1) |
| 2015 | → Dugopolje (loan) | 13 | (0) |
| 2016–2017 | Dugopolje | 24 | (3) |
| 2017–2018 | Cibalia | 22 | (0) |
| 2018–2019 | Mura | 22 | (0) |
| 2019–2021 | Maribor | 50 | (3) |
| 2021–2022 | Sabah | 15 | (1) |
| 2023– | Dugopolje | 5 | (0) |

International career
| 2011 | Croatia U18 | 3 | (0) |
- * Club domestic league appearances and goals as of 19 June 2023

Špiro Peričić (born 8 October 1993) is a Croatian football defender who plays for Dugopolje.

== Club career ==
As a youth, Peričić trained with Hajduk Split. After making several stops with clubs in the lower Croatian divisions, Peričić signed with top flight Slaven Belupo in early 2015.

Peričić signed a three-year deal with Maribor in April 2019 after moving from Croatia to Slovenia to play with Mura. The announcement of his signing before the end of the season meant that Mura dropped him from the first team as a result, even though his contract with the club was ending. Peričić scored in his debut game for Maribor in the 2019–20 UEFA Champions League first qualifying round match against Valur. His contract with Maribor was mutually terminated on 12 August 2021.

== International career ==
In 2011, Peričić made three appearances for the Croatian under-18 team.
