= Alyaksandr Nyachayew =

Belarusian professional footballer

Personal information
- Date of birth: 21 April 1994 (age 32)
- Place of birth: Brest, Belarus
- Height: 1.87 m (6 ft 2 in)
- Position: Goalkeeper

Team information
- Current team: Dynamo Brest
- Number: 21

Youth career
- 2010–2015: Dynamo Brest

Senior career*
| Years | Team | Apps | (Gls) |
| 2015–2016 | Dynamo Brest | 0 | (0) |
| 2015 | → Kobrin (loan) | 4 | (0) |
| 2017 | Lida | 23 | (0) |
| 2018–2021 | Rukh Brest | 59 | (0) |
| 2022 | Sabah | 0 | (0) |
| 2023 | Minsk | 23 | (0) |
| 2024–2025 | Gomel | 22 | (0) |
| 2026 | Khujand | 11 | (0) |
| 2026– | Dynamo Brest | 1 | (0) |

International career
| 2014 | Belarus U21 | 2 | (0) |
- * Club domestic league appearances and goals as of 29 August 2026

Alyaksandr Nyachayew (Belarusian: Аляксандр Нячаеў; Russian: Александр Нечаев; born 21 April 1994) is a Belarusian professional footballer who plays for Dynamo Brest.

== Club career ==
On 19 January 2022, Nyachayew signed a 1.5-year contract with Azerbaijani club Sabah. On 29 December 2022, Nyachayew left Sabah after his contract was terminated by mutual agreement.

On 13 February 2023, Nyachayew signed a one-year contract with Minsk.
