= Higor Gabriel =

Brazilian footballer (born 1999)

Personal information
- Full name: Higor Gabriel Fernandes Alves
- Date of birth: 28 April 1999 (age 27)
- Place of birth: Jaguariúna, Brazil
- Height: 1.88 m (6 ft 2 in)
- Position: Defender

Team information
- Current team: FC Yelimay
- Number: 3

Senior career*
Years	Team	Apps	(Gls)
2017	Rio Branco EC	0	(0)
2020–2021	Fluminense	1	(0)
2021–2023	Sabah	2	(0)
2022	→ Dinamo Minsk (loan)	12	(0)
2023	→ Lviv (loan)	11	(0)
2024	Hibernians	26	(0)
2025–2026	Navbahor	16	(2)
2026–	Yelimay	11	(0)

International career^{‡}
2016	Brazil U17	2	(0)
- * Club domestic league appearances and goals as of 1 July 2026 ‡ National team caps and goals as of 14 June 2016

Higor Gabriel Fernandes Alves (born 28 April 1999) is a Brazilian professional football player who plays as a defender for Kazakhstan Premier League club Yelimay.

== Club career ==
=== Rio Branco EC ===
Higor scored on his Copa Paulista debut for Rio Branco SP against Osasco Audax on 23 July 2017, scoring in the 90th+3rd minute.

=== Fluminense ===
Higor made his league debut for Fluminense against Portuguesa RJ on 7 March 2021.

=== Sabah ===
On 4 February 2022, Sabah announced the signing of Gabriel. He made his league debut for the club against Sabail on 19 March 2022.

On 23 September 2023, Gabriel was released by Sabah.

=== Dinamo Minsk ===
On 21 July 2022, Gabriel joined Dinamo Minsk on loan until the end of the year. He made his debut for the club against Belshina on 27 August 2022.

=== Lviv ===
On 4 February 2023, Gabriel joined Lviv on loan until June 2023. He made his league debut for the club against Mynai on 6 March 2023.

=== Hibernians ===
On 31 January 2024, Hibernians announced the signing of Gabriel. He made his league debut for the club against Floriana on 10 February 2024.

== Career statistics ==
As of match played 7 November 2024

Appearances and goals by club, season and competition
Club	Season	League			State League		National cup (Note: Includes Copa do Brasil, Azerbaijan Cup, Belarusian Cup, Ukrainian Cup, Maltese FA Trophy)		Continental		Other		Total	
Club	Season	Division	Apps	Goals	Apps	Goals	Apps	Goals	Apps	Goals	Apps	Goals	Apps	Goals
Rio Branco EC	2017	—			0	0	—		—		7 (Note: Appearance(s) in Copa Paulista)	1	7	1
Fluminense	2020	Série A	0	0	0	0	0	0	0	0	—		0	0
Fluminense	2021	Série A	0	0	1 (Note: Appearance(s) in Campeonato Carioca)	0	0	0	0	0	—		1	0
Fluminense	Total		0	0	1	0	0	0	0	0	—		1	0
Sabah	2021-22	Azerbaijan Premier League	2	0	—		0	0	—		—		2	0
Dinamo Minsk (loan)	2022	Belarusian Premier League	12	0	—		0	0	0	0	—		12	0
Lviv (loan)	2022-23	Ukrainian Premier League	11	0	—		—		—		—		11	0
Hibernians	2023-24	Maltese Premier League	9	0	—		1	0	—		—		10	0
Hibernians	2024-25	Maltese Premier League	10	0	—		0	0	—		—		10	0
Hibernians	Total		19	0	—		1	0	—		—		19	0
Career total			44	0	1	0	1	0	0	0	7	1	43	1
