= Bank Respublika Arena =

Football stadium in Absheron, Azerbaijan

Coordinates: 40.486186°N 49.766262°E

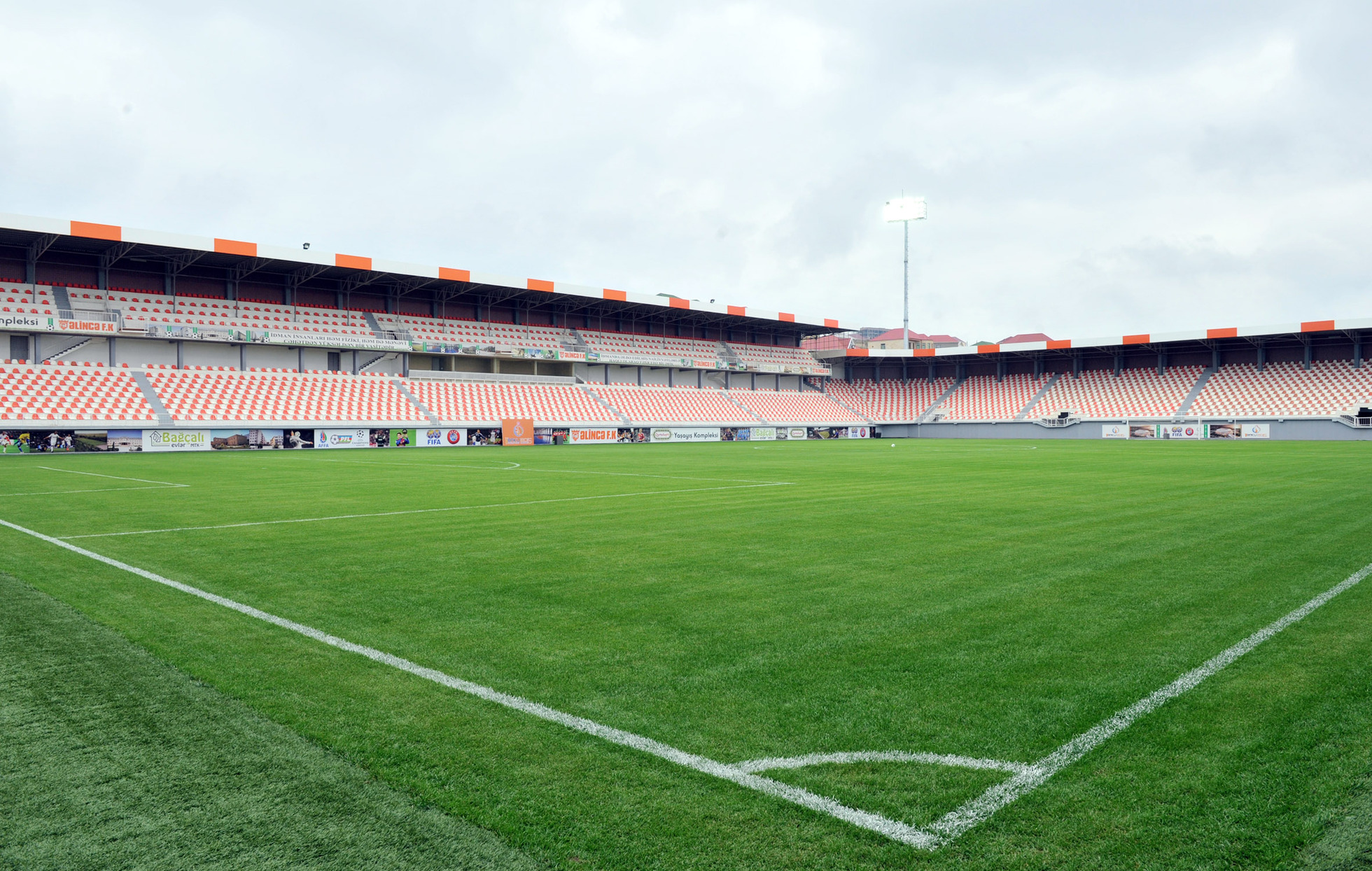
- Interactive map of Bank Respublika Arena
- Location: Masazır, Azerbaijan
- Capacity: 8,969
- Surface: Grass

Construction
- Opened: October 3, 2014

Tenant
- Sabah FK

Bank Respublika Arena, former Alinja Arena, is a multi-use stadium in Masazır settlement of Absheron, Azerbaijan. It is currently used mostly for football matches. The stadium holds 8,600 people and opened in 2014.

== See also ==
- List of football stadiums in Azerbaijan
