= Oleksiy Kashchuk =

Ukrainian footballer (born 2000)

Personal information
- Full name: Oleksiy Mykolayovych Kashchuk
- Date of birth: 29 June 2000 (age 26)
- Place of birth: Novohrad-Volynskyi, Ukraine
- Height: 1.82 m (6 ft 0 in)
- Position: Winger

Team information
- Current team: Qarabağ
- Number: 21

Youth career
- 2013–2018: Shakhtar Donetsk

Senior career*
Years	Team	Apps	(Gls)
2018–2019	Shakhtar Donetsk II		
2019–2024	Shakhtar Donetsk	10	(3)
2019–2022	→ Mariupol (loan)	48	(8)
2022–2023	→ Sabah (loan)	39	(18)
2024–	Qarabağ	48	(10)

International career^{‡}
2015–2017	Ukraine U17	18	(8)
2017–2019	Ukraine U19	13	(2)
2018–2019	Ukraine U20	8	(0)
2020–2023	Ukraine U21	13	(3)
2024	Ukraine U23	1	(0)
2026–	Ukraine	2	(0)
Medal record
Men's football
Representing Ukraine
FIFA U-20 World Cup
Winner	2019 Poland
UEFA European Under-21 Championship
Bronze medal – third place	2023 Georgia-Romania
- * Club domestic league appearances and goals as of 22 June 2026 ‡ National team caps and goals as of 18 November 2026

Oleksiy Mykolayovych Kashchuk (Ukrainian: Олексій Миколайович Кащук; born 29 June 2000) is a Ukrainian professional footballer who plays as a midfielder for Azerbaijan Premier League club Qarabağ and the Ukraine national team.

== Career ==
Born in Novohrad-Volynskyi, Zhytomyr Oblast, Kashchuk is a product of Shakhtar Donetsk youth sportive school system. Within the youth teams of the club, he became a champion of the Ukrainian Youth Football League in the U-14 (2013) and U-15 (2014) age categories. In the 2014/15 season, he became the top scorer of the club's U-16 team, scoring 23 goals in 21 matches. On May 14, 2016, he made his debut for Shakhtar's U-21 team. He started the 2017/18 season with the youth team, scoring a goal in the match against Vorskla (3-1), and at the end of that season, he won the gold medals of the Ukrainian Youth Championship.

In 2018, he moved to the Shakhtar's second team, and in 2019, to the first team, but he was unable to make his debut with the main squad and was immediately loaned to FC Mariupol. He made his debut for FC Mariupol in the Ukrainian Premier League as a second-half substitute against FC Oleksandriya on 3 August 2019.

On 29 March 2022, Azerbaijan Premier League club Sabah announced the signing of Kashchuk on loan until the end of the season.

After his contract with Shakhtar Donetsk expired, Kashchuk became a free agent. On September 3, 2024, he signed a three-year contract with Azerbaijan Premier League club Qarabağ. On 16 September 2025, he scored his first UEFA Champions League goal, securing a 3–2 away win over Benfica.

== International career ==
Kashchuk was a part of the Ukraine national under-20 football team that won the 2019 FIFA U-20 World Cup. He played one of the key roles in Ukraine's success, appearing in all 7 of his team's matches.

On 6 March 2024, Kashchuk was called up by Ruslan Rotan to the Ukraine Olympic football team preliminary squad as a preparation to the 2024 Summer Olympics.

=== International ===
As of match played 17 November 2026

Appearances and goals by national team and year
National team	Year	Apps	Goals
Ukraine	2026	2	0
Total		2	0

== Honours ==
Shakhtar Donetsk

- Ukrainian Premier League: 2023–24
- Ukrainian Cup: 2023–24

Qarabağ

- Azerbaijan Premier League: 2024–25

Ukraine U20

- FIFA U-20 World Cup: 2019
