= Anatoliy Nuriyev =

Azerbaijani footballer (born 1996)

Personal information
- Full name: Anatoliy Anatoliyovych Nuriyev
- Date of birth: 20 May 1996 (age 30)
- Place of birth: Mukachevo, Ukraine
- Height: 1.82 m (6 ft 0 in)
- Positions: Attacking midfielder; forward

Team information
- Current team: Zira
- Number: 73

Youth career
- 2009–2010: Munkach Mukachevo
- 2010–2011: BRW-BIK Volodymyr-Volynskyi
- 2011–2012: Munkach Mukachevo

Senior career*
| Years | Team | Apps | (Gls) |
| 2013–2016 | Hoverla Uzhhorod | 0 | (0) |
| 2016 | Munkach Mukachevo | 8 | (4) |
| 2016–2017 | Serednye | 33 | (34) |
| 2017–2018 | Stal Kamianske | 7 | (0) |
| 2018–2021 | Mynai | 74 | (36) |
| 2021–2022 | Kolos Kovalivka | 13 | (1) |
| 2022 | → Sumgayit (loan) | 5 | (1) |
| 2022–2026 | Sabah | 98 | (11) |
| 2026– | Zira | 11 | (1) |

International career^{‡}
| 2019 | Ukraine (students) | 3 | (2) |
| 2021– | Azerbaijan | 19 | (1) |
- * Club domestic league appearances and goals as of 22 June 2026 ‡ National team caps and goals as of 19:00, 13 November 2025 (UTC)

Anatoliy Anatoliyovych Nuriyev (Azerbaijani: Anatoli Anatoli oğlu Nuriyev; Ukrainian: Анатолій Анатолійович Нурієв; born 20 May 1996) is a professional footballer who plays as an attacking midfielder or as a centre-forward for Zira. Born in Ukraine, he plays for the Azerbaijan national team.

== Career ==
Nuriyev began his career playing for the DYuFC Mukacheve, BRW-BIK Volodymyr-Volynskyi, FC Hoverla Uzhhorod, FC Mukacheve, Munkach Mukacheve, and FC Serednie youth clubs.

In 2016–17 he became the top scorer of the Zakarpattia Oblast regional football championship with 25 goals in 17 games. Later Nuriyev have signed with FC Stal Kamianske and played 7 games in the Ukrainian Premier League for the club. Just before joining the Ukrainian Second League, FC Mynai that wanted to sign the player previously finally managed to accomplish it.

On 12 February 2026, Sabah announced that Nuriyev had left the club after his contract was terminated by mutual agreement, Zira announcing his signing the same day on a contract until the end of the 2025–26 season.

== International career ==
Nuriyev was born in Mukachevo, Ukraine, to a father from Azerbaijan, and a Ukrainian mother. His international career started at the 2019 Summer Universiade in Naples, Italy where he represented the Ukraine student team.

He debuted for the Azerbaijan national team in a 1–0 2022 FIFA World Cup qualification loss to Portugal on 24 March 2021.

== International goals ==
| No. | Date | Venue | Opponent | Score | Result | Competition |
|---|---|---|---|---|---|---|
| 1. | 25 September 2022 | Dalga Arena, Baku, Azerbaijan | Kazakhstan | 3–0 | 3–0 | 2022–23 UEFA Nations League C |

== Honours ==
Mynai

- Ukrainian First League: 2019–20

Sabah

- Azerbaijan Cup: 2024–25
