= Amin Seydiyev =

Azerbaijani footballer (born 1998)

Personal information
- Full name: Amin Sabir oğlu Seydiyev
- Date of birth: 15 November 1998 (age 27)
- Place of birth: Baku, Azerbaijan
- Height: 1.80 m (5 ft 11 in)
- Position: Right-back

Team information
- Current team: Sabah
- Number: 2

Youth career
- Gabala

Senior career*
Years	Team	Apps	(Gls)
2019–2020	Gabala	31	(1)
2020–	Sabah	162	(5)

International career^{‡}
2014	Azerbaijan U17	2	(0)
2016	Azerbaijan U19	3	(1)
2019	Azerbaijan U21	5	(0)
2020–	Azerbaijan	8	(0)
- * Club domestic league appearances and goals as of 22 June 2026 ‡ National team caps and goals as of 4 April 2024

Amin Sabir oğlu Seydiyev (born 15 November 1998) is an Azerbaijani professional footballer who plays as a right-back for Azerbaijan Premier League club Sabah and the Azerbaijan national team.

== Career ==
On 3 February 2019, Seydiyev made his Azerbaijan Premier League debut for Gabala in a match against Sumgayit.

On 21 May 2020, Seydiyev signed a three-year contract with Sabah.

== Honours ==
Gabala

- Azerbaijan Cup: 2018–19

Sabah

- Azerbaijan Premier League: 2025–26
- Azerbaijan Cup: 2024–25, 2025–26
