= Jamal Jafarov =

Azerbaijani footballer (born 2002)

Personal information
- Full name: Jamal Ali-abas oglu Jafarov
- Date of birth: 25 February 2002 (age 24)
- Place of birth: Azerbaijan
- Height: 1.78 m (5 ft 10 in)
- Position: Forward

Team information
- Current team: Kapaz
- Number: 6

Youth career
- Anzhi Makhachkala

Senior career*
| Years | Team | Apps | (Gls) |
| 2020–2026 | Sabah | 21 | (0) |
| 2024 | → Kapaz (loan) | 11 | (0) |
| 2024–2025 | → Kapaz (loan) | 31 | (2) |
| 2026– | Kapaz | 5 | (0) |

International career^{‡}
| 2018 | Azerbaijan U17 | 3 | (0) |
| 2021–2024 | Azerbaijan U21 | 16 | (0) |
Medal record
Men's football
Representing Azerbaijan
Islamic Solidarity Games
| Bronze medal – third place | 2021 Konya |
- * Club domestic league appearances and goals as of 24 March 2026 ‡ National team caps and goals as of 6 September 2024

Jamal Jafarov (Azerbaijani: Camal Əli-abas oğlu Cəfərov; born on 25 February 2002) is an Azerbaijani professional footballer who plays as a forward for Sabah in the Azerbaijan Premier League.

== Career ==
=== Club ===
On 17 April 2021, Jafarov made his debut in the Azerbaijan Premier League for Sabah match against Shamakhi.

He was loaned from Sabah to Kəpəz for the 2023-2024 and 2024–2025 seasons.

On 13 February 2026, Sabah announced that both Jafarov had left the club, with Jafarov signing for Kapaz on a contract until the end of the season the following day.
