= Christian (footballer, born 1989) =

Brazilian footballer

Personal information
- Full name: Christian da Silva Fiel
- Date of birth: 14 June 1989 (age 37)
- Place of birth: Belém, Brazil
- Height: 1.83 m (6 ft 0 in)
- Position: Midfielder

Team information
- Current team: North Esporte Clube

Senior career*
Years	Team	Apps	(Gls)
2007–2011	Tuna Luso	1	(1)
2009	→ Time Negra (loan)		
2011	Goiatuba		
2011	Evangélica		
2012	Castanhal		
2013–2014	Grêmio Anápolis		
2013–2014	→ APOEL (loan)	4	(0)
2014–2015	CFR Cluj	15	(2)
2015	→ Nacional (loan)	12	(0)
2015–2019	Paços de Ferreira	51	(2)
2017–2018	→ Nacional (loan)	37	(2)
2019–2020	Feirense	22	(1)
2020–2021	Casa Pia	31	(1)
2021–2022	Académica de Coimbra	1	(0)
2022–2024	Sabah	62	(3)
2024–2025	Turan Tovuz	34	(3)
2026–	North Esporte Clube	0	(0)
- * Club domestic league appearances and goals as of 27 June 2025

Christian da Silva Fiel (born 14 June 1989), known as just Christian, is a Brazilian professional footballer who plays as a midfielder for Campeonato Mineiro club North Esporte Clube.

== Career ==
=== Brazil ===
Christian started his career at Brazil, where he played for Tuna Luso, Time Negra, Goiatuba, Evangélica, Castanhal and Grêmio Anápolis. When he was 18 years old, he was scouted and trialled at Sport Club Internacional, but when he turned 19, they thought he was too old for improvement. During his time in Evangélica, he played for free in order to attract interest from bigger teams. His football skills impressed the technical director of Grêmio Anápolis, Marco Aurelio and Teixeira and offered him a place in their squad in 2012, but his move was delayed for one year due to an injury problem. Being a player of Grêmio Anápolis he attracted interest from nine European clubs, but only APOEL made an offer for him, when he impressed Portuguese manager, Paulo Sérgio Bento Brito.

=== APOEL ===
On 20 June 2013, he moved abroad for the first time and joined Cypriot side APOEL, on a season-long loan deal from Grêmio Anápolis. He made his APOEL debut against NK Maribor at GSP Stadium on 31 July 2013, in a 1–1 first leg draw for the third qualifying round of the 2013–14 UEFA Champions League. His first career title came on 17 August 2013, after APOEL beat Apollon Limassol 1–0 at GSP Stadium to win the 2013 Cypriot Super Cup, with Christian playing the whole game in a left back position. During his six-month spell at APOEL, Christian also appeared in four league matches, one Cup match, two Champions League qualifying matches, two Europa League qualifying matches and three UEFA Europa League group stage matches, without scoring any goal.

On 8 January 2014, APOEL terminated Christian's contract with the club by mutual consent, and after only six months in Cyprus he returned to Brazilian side Grêmio Anápolis.

=== CFR Cluj ===
In July 2014, Christian signed a one-year contract with Romanian side CFR Cluj. After six months, in January 2015, he was loaned by CFR Cluj to C.D. Nacional in Portugal.

=== Paços de Ferreira ===
On 8 July 2015, after his contract with CFR Cluj expired, Christina signed a four-year deal with Paços de Ferreira.

=== Sabah ===
On 3 February 2022, Sabah announced the signing of Christian to an 18-month contract. On 6 July 2023, Christian extended his contract with Sabah until June 2024.

== Honours ==
APOEL

- Cypriot Super Cup: 2013

Paços Ferreira

- LigaPro: 2018–19
