= Cristian Ceballos =

Spanish footballer (born 1992)

Personal information
- Full name: Cristian Ceballos Prieto
- Date of birth: 3 December 1992 (age 33)
- Place of birth: Santander, Spain
- Height: 1.75 m (5 ft 9 in)
- Positions: Attacking midfielder; forward

Team information
- Current team: Fiorentina (assistant)

Youth career
- 2004–2011: Barcelona
- 2011–2013: Tottenham Hotspur

Senior career*
Years	Team	Apps	(Gls)
2013–2015	Tottenham Hotspur	0	(0)
2013–2014	→ Arouca (loan)	19	(1)
2015–2017	Charlton Athletic	5	(0)
2016–2017	→ Sint-Truiden (loan)	20	(1)
2017–2019	Sint-Truiden	18	(2)
2019–2021	Al-Wakrah	25	(3)
2021	Qatar	3	(1)
2021–2024	Sabah	29	(5)
Total		119	(13)
- * Club domestic league appearances and goals

Cristian Ceballos Prieto (born 3 December 1992) is a Spanish former professional footballer who played as an attacking midfielder or forward. He is currently the assistant head coach of Serie A club Fiorentina.

== Career ==
=== Barcelona ===
Ceballos joined Barcelona's La Masia youth facility at the age of 11. In 2007, he became a YouTube sensation after being filmed juggling the ball with Ronaldinho. He progressed through the youth system but was impeded by injuries. In 2004, he took part in the Torneo Nacional Alevín de Fútbol in Brunete for Barcelona's U-12 side where he scored 8 goals and won the trophy for the tournament's best player. Having been released from his contract at Barcelona in 2010, Ceballos trained with Chelsea in March 2011.

=== Tottenham Hotspur ===
Following a trial, Tottenham Hotspur completed the signing of Ceballos on 11 July 2011. He was named on the substitutes bench for a League Cup tie at Stoke City on 20 September. During his first season at the club he was a regular in the Spurs XI reserve team, scoring 10 goals in 13 appearances.

For the 2012–13 season Ceballos was selected in the provisional squad and was given the number 44 shirt. He played for Tottenham's U21 side in the new Barclays U21 Premier League and scored a hat-trick against Southampton in a 4–2 win. He also netted a brace against Liverpool in the Elite Group of the league on 1 April 2013.

On 2 September 2013, Ceballos joined newly promoted Portuguese Primeira Liga side Arouca on loan and was given the number 11 shirt. On 20 September, he made his professional debut; coming on as a 63rd-minute substitute in a 1–0 loss to Braga.

Ahead of the 2014–15 season Ceballos was given the number 39 shirt and was a regular on the substitutes bench, including for the 2–1 victory against Hull City in November. He was released by Tottenham Hotspur at the end of the season.

=== Later career ===
On 23 July 2015, Ceballos joined Charlton Athletic on a three-year deal.

On 1 August 2016, Ceballos joined Belgian side Sint-Truiden on a season-long loan. On 19 July 2017, he joined them permanently.

On 14 July 2019, Ceballos joined Qatari side Al-Wakrah on a free transfer, after his contract with Sint-Truiden was rescinded.

On 10 March 2021, Ceballos joined Qatar SC.

On 8 August 2021, Ceballos joined Azeri side Sabah, signing a three-year contract.

== Career statistics ==
Appearances by club, season and competition
Club	Season	League			National cup (Note: Includes Taça de Portugal, FA Cup, Belgian Cup, Azerbaijan Cup)		League cup (Note: Includes Taça da Liga, EFL Cup, QSL Cup)		Other		Total	
Club	Season	Division	Apps	Goals	Apps	Goals	Apps	Goals	Apps	Goals	Apps	Goals
Arouca (loan)	2013–14	Primeira Liga	19	1	2	0	2	1	0	0	23	2
Charlton	2015–16	Championship	5	0	1	0	1	0	0	0	7	0
Sint-Truiden (loan)	2016–17	Belgian Pro League	20	1	2	1	—		11 (Note: Appearances in Belgian First Division Europa League play-offs)	4	33	6
Sint-Truiden	2017–18	Belgian Pro League	2	2	0	0	—		0	0	2	2
Sint-Truiden	2018–19	Belgian Pro League	16	0	1	0	—		7	1	24	1
Sint-Truiden	Total		38	3	3	1	—		18	5	59	9
Al-Wakrah	2019–20	Qatar Stars League	11	2	0	0	0	0	0	0	11	2
Al-Wakrah	2020–21	Qatar Stars League	14	1	0	0	4	2	0	0	18	3
Al-Wakrah	Total		25	3	0	0	4	2	0	0	29	5
Qatar SC	2020–21	Qatar Stars League	3	1	0	0	0	0	0	0	3	1
Sabah	2021–22	Azerbaijan Premier League	10	2	0	0	—		0	0	10	2
Sabah	2022–23	Azerbaijan Premier League	19	3	2	1	—		0	0	21	4
Sabah	2023–24	Azerbaijan Premier League	0	0	0	0	—		0	0	0	0
Sabah	Total		29	5	2	1	—		0	0	31	6
Career total			119	13	8	2	7	3	18	5	152	23
