= Sabah FK in European football =

Overview of Sabah FK's role in European football

Sabah FK in European Football
- Club: Sabah
- Seasons played: 4
- Most appearances: Joy-Lance Mickels (21)
- Top scorer: Joy-Lance Mickels (12)
- First entry: 2023–24 UEFA Europa Conference League
- Latest entry: 2026–27 UEFA Champions League

Sabah have participated in 4 editions of the club competitions governed by UEFA, the chief authority for football across Europe.

== History ==
=== Matches ===
As of match played 4 November 2026

Season	Competition	Round	Club	Home	Away	Aggregate	Ref.
2023–24	UEFA Europa Conference League	2Q	(Latvia) RFS	2–1	2–0	4–1	
2023–24	UEFA Europa Conference League	3Q	(Serbia) Partizan	2–0	0–2 (a.e.t.)	2–2 (4–5 p)	
2024–25	UEFA Conference League	2Q	(Israel) Maccabi Haifa	3–6 (a.e.t.)	3–0	6–6 (3–2 p)	
2024–25	UEFA Conference League	3Q	(Republic of Ireland) St Patrick's Athletic	0–1	0–1	0–2	
2025–26	UEFA Europa League	1Q	(Slovenia) Celje	2–3	3–3 (a.e.t.)	5–6	
2025–26	UEFA Conference League	2Q	(Moldova) Petrocub Hîncești	4–1	2–0	6–1	
2025–26	UEFA Conference League	3Q	(Bulgaria) Levski Sofia	0–2	0–1	0–3	
2026–27	UEFA Champions League	1Q	(Wales) The New Saints	2–0	2–1	4–1	
2026–27	UEFA Champions League	2Q	(Finland) KuPS	1–0	2–0	3–0	
2026–27	UEFA Champions League	3Q	(Denmark) Aarhus	4–0	1–2	5–2	
2026–27	UEFA Champions League	PO	(Israel) Hapoel Be'er Sheva	5–2 (a.e.t.)	1–2	6–4	
2026–27	UEFA Champions League	LP	(England) Manchester United	—N/a	0–4		
2026–27	UEFA Champions League	LP	(Czech Republic) Slavia Prague	2–0	—N/a		
2026–27	UEFA Champions League	LP	(Germany) Borussia Dortmund	1–2	—N/a		
2026–27	UEFA Champions League	LP	(Norway) Viking	—N/a	1–4		
2026–27	UEFA Champions League	LP	(Spain) Barcelona		—N/a		
2026–27	UEFA Champions League	LP	(Spain) Villarreal	—N/a			
2026–27	UEFA Champions League	LP	(Italy) Napoli		—N/a		
2026–27	UEFA Champions League	LP	(England) Arsenal	—N/a			

Notes

- 1Q: First qualifying round
- 2Q: Second qualifying round
- 3Q: Third qualifying round
- PO: Play-off round
- LP: League phase

== Player statistics ==
=== Appearances ===
As of match played 4 November 2026

Rank	Player	Years	Champions League	Europa League	Conference League	Total	Ratio
1	(Rwanda) Joy-Lance Mickels	2021–2023; 2024–present	12 (5)	2 (3)	10 (5)	23 (14)	0.54
2	(Croatia) Ivan Lepinjica	2024–present	11 (0)	2 (0)	7 (0)	20 (0)	0
3	(Azerbaijan) Rahman Dashdamirov	2023–present	11 (1)	2 (0)	6 (0)	19 (1)	0.05
4	(Kazakhstan) Stas Pokatilov	2025–present	12 (0)	2 (0)	4 (0)	18 (0)	0
4	(Algeria) Akim Zedadka	2025–present	12 (0)	2 (0)	4 (0)	18 (0)	0
6	(Jamaica) Kaheem Parris	2023–2024; 2024–present	9 (2)	1 (0)	7 (2)	17 (4)	0.24
7	(Guadeloupe) Steve Solvet	2025–present	10 (1)	2 (0)	4 (0)	16 (1)	0.06
8	(Azerbaijan) Abdulakh Khaybulayev	2021–present	8 (0)	2 (0)	5 (0)	15 (0)	0
9	(Azerbaijan) Aleksey Isayev	2022–2025; 2025–present	10 (0)	(-)	4 (1)	14 (1)	0.07
10	(Uzbekistan) Umarali Rakhmonaliev	2025; 2026–present	12 (1)	2 (0)	0 (0)	14 (1)	0.07
11	(Bosnia and Herzegovina) Bojan Letić	2022–2026	(-)	1 (0)	12 (2)	13 (2)	0.15
12	(Serbia) Veljko Simić	2025–2026; 2026–present	12 (6)	(-)	(-)	12 (6)	0.5
12	(Poland) Tymoteusz Puchacz	2025–2026; 2026–present	12 (0)	(-)	(-)	12 (0)	0
12	(Gabon) Orphé Mbina	2026; 2026–present	12 (2)	(-)	(-)	12 (2)	0.17
15	(Azerbaijan) Amin Seydiyev	2020–2026	(-)	1 (0)	9 (0)	10 (0)	0
15	(Slovakia) Pavol Šafranko	2024–2026	(-)	2 (2)	8 (4)	10 (6)	0.6
15	(Azerbaijan) Anatoliy Nuriyev	2022–2026	(-)	2 (0)	8 (0)	10 (0)	0
15	(Nigeria) Jesse Sekidika	2023–2026	(-)	2 (0)	8 (1)	10 (1)	0.1
15	(Azerbaijan) Khayal Aliyev	2024–present	1 (0)	2 (0)	7 (1)	10 (1)	0.1
20	(Curaçao) Xander Severina	2026–present	9 (1)	(-)	(-)	9 (1)	0.11
21	(Azerbaijan) Yusif İmanov	2022–2025	(-)	(-)	8 (0)	8 (0)	0
21	(Morocco) Sofian Chakla	2023–2025	(-)	(-)	8 (0)	8 (0)	0
21	(Azerbaijan) Namiq Ələsgərov	2022–2025	(-)	(-)	8 (0)	8 (0)	0
24	(Spain) Jon Irazabal	2022–2025	(-)	(-)	7 (0)	7 (0)	0
24	(Nigeria) Christian Nwachukwu	2026–present	7 (1)	(-)	(-)	7 (1)	0.14
26	(Azerbaijan) Elvin Camalov	2021–2025	(-)	(-)	6 (0)	6 (0)	0
26	(Brazil) Ygor Nogueira	2025–2026	(-)	2 (0)	4 (0)	6 (0)	0
26	(France) Zinédine Ould Khaled	2025–present	(-)	2 (0)	4 (0)	6 (0)	0
26	(Azerbaijan) Tellur Mutallimov	2022–present	3 (1)	(-)	3 (0)	6 (1)	0.17
26	(South Africa) Aden McCarthy	2026–present	6 (1)	(-)	(-)	6 (1)	0.17
31	(Serbia) Njegoš Kupusović	2024–2026	(-)	2 (0)	4 (0)	4 (0)	0
31	(Russia) Ayaz Guliyev	2023–2026	(-)	0 (0)	4 (0)	4 (0)	0
31	(Luxembourg) Vincent Thill	2023–2025	(-)	(-)	4 (0)	4 (0)	0
31	(Brazil) Christian	2022–2024	(-)	(-)	4 (0)	4 (0)	0
31	(Georgia (country)) Davit Volkovi	2022–2024	(-)	(-)	4 (1)	4 (1)	0.25
31	(Nigeria) Emmanuel Apeh	2022–2024	(-)	(-)	4 (1)	4 (1)	0.25
31	(Brazil) Du Queiroz	2026–present	4 (0)	(-)	(-)	4 (0)	0
38	(Curaçao) Jearl Margaritha	2023–2024	(-)	(-)	3 (0)	3 (0)	0
38	(Portugal) Rodrigo Fernandes	2026–present	3 (0)	(-)	(-)	3 (0)	0
38	(Brazil) Erivaldo Almeida	2026–present	3 (0)	(-)	(-)	3 (0)	0
41	(Morocco) Marouane Hadhoudi	2023–2024	(-)	(-)	2 (0)	2 (0)	0
41	(Azerbaijan) Ceyhun Nuriyev	2020–2023	(-)	(-)	2 (0)	2 (0)	0
41	(Brazil) Andrey Santos	2025–present	(-)	0 (0)	2 (0)	2 (0)	0
41	(France) Aaron Malouda	2025–2026; 2026	2 (0)	(-)	(-)	2 (0)	0
41	(France) Younes Lachaab	2026–present	2 (0)	(-)	(-)	2 (0)	0
46	(Azerbaijan) Ildar Alekperov	2021–2024	(-)	(-)	1 (0)	1 (0)	0
46	(Azerbaijan) Şakir Seyidov	2018–2025	(-)	(-)	1 (0)	1 (0)	0

=== Goalscorers ===
As of match played 4 November 2026

Rank	Player	Years	Champions League	Europa League	Conference League	Total	Ratio
1	(Rwanda) Joy-Lance Mickels	2021–2023; 2024–present	5 (12)	3 (2)	5 (10)	13 (24)	0.54
2	(Slovakia) Pavol Šafranko	2024–2026	(-)	2 (2)	4 (8)	6 (10)	0.6
2	(Serbia) Veljko Simić	2025–2026; 2026–present	6 (12)	(-)	(-)	6 (12)	0.5
4	(Jamaica) Kaheem Parris	2023–2024; 2024–present	2 (9)	0 (1)	2 (7)	4 (17)	0.24
5	(Bosnia and Herzegovina) Bojan Letić	2022–2026	(-)	0 (1)	2 (12)	2 (13)	0.15
5	(Gabon) Orphé Mbina	2026; 2026–present	2 (12)	(-)	(-)	2 (12)	0.17
7	(Georgia (country)) Davit Volkovi	2022–2024	(-)	(-)	1 (4)	1 (4)	0.25
7	(Nigeria) Emmanuel Apeh	2022–2024	(-)	(-)	1 (4)	1 (4)	0.25
7	(Azerbaijan) Aleksey Isayev	2020–2024; 2025–present	0 (10)	(-)	1 (4)	1 (14)	0.07
7	(Nigeria) Jesse Sekidika	2023–2026	(-)	0 (2)	1 (8)	1 (10)	0.1
7	(Azerbaijan) Khayal Aliyev	2024–present	0 (1)	0 (2)	1 (7)	1 (10)	0.1
7	(Azerbaijan) Rahman Dashdamirov	2023–present	1 (11)	0 (2)	0 (6)	1 (19)	0.05
7	(Guadeloupe) Steve Solvet	2025–present	1 (10)	0 (2)	0 (4)	1 (16)	0.06
7	(Curaçao) Xander Severina	2026–present	1 (9)	(-)	(-)	1 (9)	0.11
7	(Nigeria) Christian Nwachukwu	2026–present	1 (7)	(-)	(-)	1 (7)	0.14
7	(Uzbekistan) Umarali Rakhmonaliev	2025; 2026–present	1 (12)	0 (2)	(-)	1 (14)	0.07
7	(Azerbaijan) Tellur Mutallimov	2022–present	1 (3)	(-)	0 (3)	1 (6)	0.17
7	(South Africa) Aden McCarthy	2026–present	1 (6)	(-)	(-)	1 (6)	0.17

=== Clean sheets ===
As of match played 4 November 2026

Rank	Player	Years	Champions League	Europa League	Conference League	Total	Ratio
1	(Kazakhstan) Stas Pokatilov	2025–present	5 (12)	0 (2)	1 (4)	6 (18)	0.33
2	(Azerbaijan) Yusif İmanov	2022–2025	(-)	(-)	3 (8)	3 (8)	0.38

== Overall record ==
=== By competition ===
As of match played 4 November 2026

Competition	Pld	W	D	L	GF	GA
UEFA Champions League	12	7	0	5	22	17
UEFA Europa League	2	0	1	1	5	6
UEFA Conference League	12	6	0	6	18	15
Total	26	13	1	12	45	38

=== By country ===
As of match played 4 November 2026

Country	Pld	W	D	L	GF	GA	GD	Win%
Bulgaria	2	0	0	2	0	3	−3	0.00
Czech Republic	1	1	0	0	2	0	+2	100.00
Denmark	2	1	0	1	5	2	+3	50.00
England	1	0	0	1	0	4	−4	0.00
Finland	2	2	0	0	3	0	+3	100.00
Germany	1	0	0	1	1	2	−1	0.00
Israel	4	2	0	2	12	10	+2	50.00
Latvia	2	2	0	0	4	1	+3	100.00
Moldova	2	2	0	0	6	1	+5	100.00
Norway	1	0	0	1	1	4	−3	0.00
Republic of Ireland	2	0	0	2	0	2	−2	0.00
Serbia	2	1	0	1	2	2	+0	50.00
Slovenia	2	0	1	1	5	6	−1	0.00
Wales	2	2	0	0	4	1	+3	100.00

=== By club ===
As of match played 4 November 2026

Opponent	Played	Won	Drawn	Lost	For	Against	Difference	Ratio
(Denmark) Aarhus	2	1	0	1	5	2	+3	50.00
(Germany) Borussia Dortmund	1	0	0	1	1	2	−1	0.00
(Slovenia) Celje	2	0	1	1	5	6	−1	0.00
(Israel) Hapoel Be'er Sheva	2	1	0	1	6	4	+2	50.00
(Finland) KuPS	2	2	0	0	3	0	+3	100.00
(Bulgaria) Levski Sofia	2	0	0	2	0	3	−3	0.00
(Israel) Maccabi Haifa	2	1	0	1	6	6	+0	50.00
(England) Manchester United	1	0	0	1	0	4	−4	0.00
(Wales) The New Saints	2	2	0	0	4	1	+3	100.00
(Serbia) Partizan	2	1	0	1	2	2	+0	50.00
(Moldova) Petrocub Hîncești	2	2	0	0	6	1	+5	100.00
(Latvia) RFS	2	2	0	0	4	1	+3	100.00
(Czech Republic) Slavia Prague	1	1	0	0	2	0	+2	100.00
(Republic of Ireland) St Patrick's Athletic	2	0	0	2	0	2	−2	0.00
(Norway) Viking	1	0	0	1	1	4	−3	0.00
