= 2026–27 Sabah FC season =

Sabah
2026–27 season
- Manager: Valdas Dambrauskas
- Stadium: Bank Respublika Arena
- Premier League: 1st
- Azerbaijan Cup: Last 16
- Champions League: League phase
- Top goalscorer: League: Joy-Lance Mickels (5); All: Joy-Lance Mickels (10)
Home colours	Away colours

The Sabah FC 2026–27 season is Sabah's ninth Azerbaijan Premier League season, and their tenth season in existence.

== Season overview ==
On 2 June, Sabah announced the permanent signing of Veljko Simić to a two-year contract, after Simić had spent the previous season on loan at Sabah from Sivasspor, with whom his contract had then expired.

On 4 June, Sabah announced that they had extended their contract with Tellur Mutallimov until the summer of 2028.

On 9 June, Sabah announced the signing of Aden McCarthy from Kaizer Chiefs, to a three-year contract with the option of an additional year.

On 11 June, Sabah announced the season-long loan signing of Younes Lachaab from Lille.

On 12 June, Sabah announced the signing of Erivaldo Almeida from Marítimo, to a three-year contract.

On 16 June, Sabah announced the permanent signing of Orphé Mbina from Maribor, to a three-year contract after Mbina had spent the previous six-months on loan at Sabah.

On 20 June, Sabah announced the signing of Rodrigo Fernandes from Şamaxı, to a two-year contract.

On 1 July, Sabah announced the signing of Xander Severina from Maccabi Haifa, to a two-year contract, with the option of an additional year.

On 7 July, Sabah announced the signing of Amin Ramazanov to a two-year contract, after he'd left Qarabağ.

On 29 July, Swiss Super League club Basel announced the signing of Aaron Malouda from Sabah.

On 1 August, Sabah announced the signing of Christian Nwachukwu from Sheffield United, on a contract until the summer of 2029.

On 1 September, Sabah announced the season-long loan signing of Du Queiroz from Zenit St.Petersburg, with the option to make the move permanent.

On 8 September, Sabah announced the season-long loan signing of Carlos Eduardo from Gil Vicente, with the option to make the move permanent.

== Squad ==
As of match played 8 November 2026

No.	Name	Nationality	Position	Date of birth (age)	Signed from	Signed in	Contract ends	Apps.	Goals
Goalkeepers
1	Amin Ramazanov (Note: Amin Ramazanov was born in Moscow, Russia, but qualified to represent Azerbaijan, representing them at youth level.)	(Azerbaijan)	GK	20 January 2003 (age 23)	Academy	2026	2028	0	0
92	Stas Pokatilov	(Kazakhstan)	GK	8 December 1992 (age 33)	Unattached	2025	2027	80	0
94	Ravan Mirzammadov	(Azerbaijan)	GK	2 August 2005 (age 21)	Academy	2025		4	0
Defenders
3	Steve Solvet	(Guadeloupe)	DF	20 March 1996 (age 30)	Martigues	2025	2027	56	6
4	Aden McCarthy	(South Africa)	DF	4 December 2003 (age 22)	Kaizer Chiefs	2026	2029 (+1)	14	1
5	Rahman Dashdamirov	(Azerbaijan)	DF	20 October 1999 (age 27)	Shamakhi	2023		89	2
17	Tellur Mutallimov	(Azerbaijan)	DF	8 April 1995 (age 31)	Sumgayit	2024	2028	110	6
27	Tymoteusz Puchacz	(Poland)	DF	23 January 1999 (age 27)	Holstein Kiel	2026	2029	55	2
33	Erivaldo Almeida	(Brazil)	DF	15 January 2000 (age 26)	Marítimo	2026	2029	9	0
35	Japhet Dungus	(Nigeria)	DF	10 February 2007 (age 19)	Academy	2026		2	0
36	Godfred Boakye	(Belgium)	DF	12 January 2006 (age 20)	Birmingham City	2026		0	0
80	Akim Zedadka (Note: Akim Zedadka was born in Pertuis, France, but qualified to represent Algeria, making his debut in 2022.)	(Algeria)	DF	30 May 1995 (age 31)	Piast Gliwice	2025	2027	55	1
Midfielders
6	Abdulakh Khaybulayev (Note: Abdulakh Khaybulayev was born in Khasavyurt, Russia, but qualified to represent Azerbaijan, making his debut in 2025.)	(Azerbaijan)	MF	19 August 2001 (age 25)	Academy	2021		99	3
7	Umarali Rakhmonaliev	(Uzbekistan)	MF	18 August 2003 (age 23)	Rubin Kazan	2026	2028	72	10
9	Khayal Aliyev	(Azerbaijan)	MF	18 February 2004 (age 22)	Academy	2023		89	10
10	Aleksey Isayev (Note: Aleksey Isayev was born in Krasnoyarsk, Russia, but qualified to represent Azerbaijan, making his debut in 2021.)	(Azerbaijan)	MF	9 November 1995 (age 31)	Qarabağ	2025	2027	154	17
11	Kaheem Parris	(Jamaica)	MF	6 January 2000 (age 26)	Dynamo Kyiv	2024		116	19
13	Ivan Lepinjica	(Croatia)	MF	9 July 1999 (age 27)	Slaven Belupo	2024		90	2
16	Rauf Rustamli	(Azerbaijan)	MF	11 January 2003 (age 23)	Gabala	2023		4	0
20	Joy-Lance Mickels (Note: Joy-Lance Mickels was born in Germany, but qualified to represent Rwanda, making his debut in 2026.)	(Rwanda)	MF	29 March 1994 (age 32)	Al Faisaly	2024	2028	161	84
21	Veljko Simić	(Serbia)	MF	17 February 1995 (age 31)	Unattached	2026	2028	52	20
22	Zinédine Ould Khaled	(France)	MF	14 January 2000 (age 26)	Angers	2025	2027	18	0
23	Younes Lachaab	(France)	MF	6 January 2005 (age 21)	on loan from Lille	2026	2027	7	0
34	Xander Severina (Note: Xander Severina was born in Rijswijk, Netherlands, but qualified to represent Curaçao, making his debut in 2023.)	(Curaçao)	MF	12 April 2001 (age 25)	Maccabi Haifa	2026	2028 (+1)	14	3
37	Du Queiroz	(Brazil)	MF	7 January 2000 (age 26)	on loan from Zenit St.Petersburg	2026	2027	11	0
88	Rodrigo Fernandes	(Portugal)	MF	23 March 2001 (age 25)	Şamaxı	2026	2028	8	0
89	Cafar Mukhtarov	(Azerbaijan)	MF	22 February 2005 (age 21)	Şamaxı	2025		3	0
Forwards
8	Christian Nwachukwu	(Nigeria)	FW	27 December 2005 (age 20)	Sheffield United	2026	2029	15	2
18	Carlos Eduardo	(Brazil)	FW	10 August 2002 (age 24)	on loan from Gil Vicente	2026	2027	6	1
90	Timilehin Oluwaseun	(Nigeria)	FW	10 June 2005 (age 21)	Dino SC	2024		2	0
99	Orphé Mbina	(Gabon)	FW	2 November 2000 (age 26)	Maribor	2026	2029	31	7
Out on loan
53	Andrey Santos	(Brazil)	DF	20 March 2005 (age 21)	Canaã EC	2025		8	0
22	Abdulla Rzayev	(Azerbaijan)	MF	12 March 2002 (age 24)	Academy	2021		21	0
Left during the season
19	Aaron Malouda	(France)	FW	30 November 2005 (age 20)	Lille	2026	2029	31	9
83	Stephen Ende	(Nigeria)	FW	8 June 2006 (age 20)	Dino SC	2024		9	0

== Transfers ==
=== In ===
Date	Position	Nationality	Name	From	Fee	Ref.
2 June 2026	MF	(Serbia)	Veljko Simić	Unattached	Free	
9 June 2026	DF	(South Africa)	Aden McCarthy	Kaizer Chiefs	Undisclosed	
12 June 2026	DF	(Brazil)	Erivaldo Almeida	Marítimo	Undisclosed	
16 June 2026	FW	(Gabon)	Orphé Mbina	Maribor	Undisclosed	
20 June 2026	MF	(Portugal)	Rodrigo Fernandes	Şamaxı	Undisclosed	
1 July 2026	MF	(Curaçao)	Xander Severina	Maccabi Haifa	Undisclosed	
7 July 2026	GK	(Azerbaijan)	Amin Ramazanov	Unattached	Free	
1 August 2026	FW	(Nigeria)	Christian Nwachukwu	Sheffield United	Undisclosed	

=== Loans in ===
Date from	Position	Nationality	Name	From	Date to	Ref.
11 June 2026	MF	(France)	Younes Lachaab	Lille	30 June 2027	
1 September 2026	MF	(Brazil)	Du Queiroz	Zenit St.Petersburg	30 June 2027	
8 September 2026	FW	(Brazil)	Carlos Eduardo	Gil Vicente	30 June 2027	

=== Out ===
Date	Position	Nationality	Name	From	Fee	Ref.
17 July 2026	FW	(Nigeria)	Stephen Ende	Iberia 1999	Undisclosed	
29 July 2026	FW	(France)	Aaron Malouda	Basel	Undisclosed	

=== Loans out ===
Date from	Position	Nationality	Name	To	Date to	Ref.
18 June 2026	DF	(Brazil)	Andrey Santos	Iberia 1999	End of season	

=== Released ===
Date	Position	Nationality	Name	Joined	Date	Ref
30 June 2026	DF	(Brazil)	Ygor Nogueira	Rostov	1 July 2026	

== Friendlies ==
28 June 2026	Ferencváros	1–1	Sabah	Tyrol, Austria
19:00 AZT (UTC+4)	Goal	Report	Bulus

2 July 2026	Polissya Zhytomyr	4–1	Sabah	Tyrol, Austria
19:00 AZT (UTC+4)	Andrade; Fedor; Krushynskyi; Krasnopir	Report	Simić

	–
AZT (UTC+4)

== Competitions ==
=== Overview ===
Competition	First match	Last match	Starting round	Record							
Competition	First match	Last match	Starting round	Pld	W	D	L	GF	GA	GD	Win %
Premier League	15 August 2026	2027	Matchday 1	10	6	3	1	22	6	+16	60.00
Azerbaijan Cup	2026		Round of 16	0	0	0	0	0	0	+0	—
UEFA Champions League	7 July 2026		First qualifying round	11	7	0	4	22	17	+5	63.64
Total				21	13	3	5	44	23	+21	61.90

Last updated: 8 November 2026
Source: Competitions

=== Premier League ===
==== Results summary ====
Overall								Home						Away					
Pld	W	D	L	GF	GA	GD	Pts	W	D	L	GF	GA	GD	W	D	L	GF	GA	GD
10	6	3	1	22	6	+16	21	3	2	0	12	3	+9	3	1	1	10	3	+7

Last updated: 8 November 2026.
Source: See Results

==== Results by round ====
Round	1	3	4	5	6	7	8	9	10	11
Ground	H	A	H	H	H	A	A	H	A	H
Result	W	W	W	W	W	D	W	D	L	D
Position	3	4	2	2	2	2	1	1	2	2

Updated to match(es) played on 8 November 2026. Source: See Results
A = Away; H = Home; W = Win; D = Draw; L = Loss

==== Results ====
15 August 2026 1	Sabah	2–0	Kapaz	Masazir
20:45 AZT (UTC+4)	Fernandes (yellow card) 35'; Dungus (yellow card) 44'; Mickels 72' (pen.); Severina 90+1'	Report	Abubakar (yellow card) 30'; Verdasca (yellow card) 70'	Stadium: Bank Respublika Arena; Attendance: 1,132; Referee: Fərid Hacıyev

21–24 August 2026 2	Sabah	–	Sumgayit	Masazir
AZT (UTC+4)		Report		Stadium: Bank Respublika Arena

31 August 2026 3	Araz-Naxçıvan	0–1	Sabah	Qabala
18:00 AZT (UTC+4)		Report	Mbina 49'	Stadium: City Stadium; Attendance: 150; Referee: Rəvan Həmzəzadə

5 September 2026 4	Sabah	5–0	Zira	Masazir
18:30 AZT (UTC+4)	Simić 7'; Mickels 14' (pen.), 30', 57'; Almeida (yellow card) 50'; Nwachukwu 51'	Report	Ktatau (yellow card) 23'	Stadium: Bank Respublika Arena; Attendance: 1,752; Referee: İnqilab Məmmədov

14 September 2026 5	Shafa Baku	0–3	Sabah	Sumgait
19:00 AZT (UTC+4)		Report	Mbina 25'; Khaybulayev 29'; Simić 69'	Stadium: Kapital Bank Arena; Attendance: 500; Referee: Nicat İsmayıllı

19 September 2026 6	Sabah	3–1	İmişli	Masazir
19:45 AZT (UTC+4)	Mammadzada 20' (o.g.); Rakhmonaliev 35'; Puchacz (yellow card) 73'; Parris 90+5'	Report	Salahlı (yellow card) 44'; Hasanalizade (yellow card) 45+1'; Moses (yellow card) 47'; Rollo (yellow card) 64'; Faracov (yellow card) 82'; Ronaldo Rodrigues 90'; Juninho (red card) 90+1'	Stadium: Bank Respublika Arena; Attendance: 1,150; Referee: Kamal Umudlu

9 October 2026 7	Neftçi	0–0	Sabah	Baku
19:30 (UTC+4)	Sacko (yellow card) 77'; Tupta (yellow card) 89'	Report	Du Queiroz (yellow card) 45'; Simić (yellow card) 77'; McCarthy (yellow card) 90+2'	Stadium: Neftçi Arena; Attendance: 7,076; Referee: Rauf Cabarov

17 October 2026 8	Qabala	0–4	Sabah	Qabala
16:00 AZT (UTC+4)		Report	Khaybulayev 45+1'; Isayev 74', 90+3'; Mickels 88'	Stadium: City Stadium; Attendance: 750; Referee: Əliyar Ağayev

25 October 2026 9	Sabah	0–0	Qarabağ	Baku
18:00 AZT (UTC+4)	Du Queiroz (yellow card) 85'; Nwachukwu (yellow card) 88'	Report	Janković (yellow card) 19'; Kashchuk (yellow card) 71'	Stadium: Dalga Arena; Attendance: 5,180; Referee: Rəşad Əhmədov

30 October 2026 10	Turan Tovuz	3–2	Sabah	Tovuz
18:30 AZT (UTC+4)	Henrique 28'; Jô 29', 67'; Baklov (yellow card) 90+1'; Olabe (yellow card) 90+2'; Hurtado (yellow card) 90+5'	Report	Du Queiroz (yellow card) 7'; Lepinjica (yellow card) 56'; Mickels 70'; Severina 87'; Zedadka (yellow card) 90+2'	Stadium: City Stadium; Attendance: 4,000; Referee: Kamranbəy Rəhimov

8 November 2026 11	Sabah	2–2	Şamaxı	Masazir
17:30 AZT (UTC+4)	Eduardo 17'; Mickels 49'	Report	Mammadov 27'; Dashdamirov 62' (o.g.)	Stadium: Bank Respublika Arena; Attendance: 937; Referee: Kamal Umudlu

20 November 2026 12	Sumgayit	–	Sabah	Sumgait
19:00 AZT (UTC+4)		Report		Stadium: City Stadium

==== League table ====
Pos	Team	Pld	W	D	L	GF	GA	GD	Pts	Qualification or relegation
1	Neftçi	11	7	3	1	26	11	+15	24	Qualification for the Champions League first qualifying round
2	Sabah	10	6	3	1	22	6	+16	21	Qualification for the Conference League second qualifying round (Note: The 2026–27 Azerbaijan Cup winner will qualify for the Europa League first qualifying round. If the cup winner finishes in the top three, the second Conference League berth will be passed to the fourth place team.)
3	Turan Tovuz	11	6	3	2	12	8	+4	21	Qualification for the Conference League second qualifying round
4	Qarabağ	10	5	4	1	14	8	+6	19	
5	Zira	11	5	4	2	16	15	+1	19	

Updated to match(es) played on 8 November 2026. Source: Soccerway
Rules for classification: 1) Points; 2) Matches won; 3) Goal difference; 4) Goals scored; 5) Head-to-head points; 6) Head-to-head goal difference; 7) Lower number of points based on yellow and red cards; 8) Draw.

=== Azerbaijan Cup ===
Last 16	Sabah	–	İmişli	Masazir
AZT (UTC+4)				Stadium: Bank Respublika Arena

=== Champions League ===
==== Qualifying rounds ====
7 July 2026 First qualifying round 1st leg	Sabah (Azerbaijan)	2–0	(Wales) The New Saints	Masazir, Azerbaijan
20:00 AZT (UTC+4)	Mickels (yellow card) 28'; Zedadka (yellow card) 45+2'; Solvet (yellow card) 62' (yellow-red card) 90+2'; Simić 66'; Parris 84'	Report	J. Williams (yellow card) 45+2'; D. Williams (yellow card) 83'	Stadium: Bank Respublika Arena; Attendance: 7,000; Referee: Patryk Gryckiewicz (Poland)

14 July 2026 First qualifying round 2nd leg	The New Saints (Wales)	1–2 (1–4 agg.)	(Azerbaijan) Sabah	Oswestry, England
21:30 AZT (UTC+4)	Hughes (yellow card) 48'; Brobbel (yellow card) 72'; Lock 89'	Report	Lepinjica (yellow card) 5'; Mickels 28'; Dashdamirov 42'	Stadium: Park Hall; Attendance: 1,179; Referee: Mateo Busquets Ferrer (Spain)

21 July 2026 Second qualifying round 1st leg	Sabah (Azerbaijan)	1–0	(Finland) KuPS	Masazir, Azerbaijan
20:00 AZT (UTC+4)	Simić 45+1'; Parris (yellow card) 49'	Report	Jyry (yellow card) 47'; Moreno (yellow card) 77'	Stadium: Bank Respublika Arena; Attendance: 7,100; Referee: Łukasz Kuźma (Poland)

28 July 2026 Second qualifying round 2nd leg	KuPS (Finland)	0–2 (0–3 agg.)	(Azerbaijan) Sabah	Kuopio, Finland
19:00 AZT (UTC+4)	Pennanen (yellow card) 62'; Touray (yellow card) 72'; Magassa (yellow card) 89'	Report	Simić 52'; Rakhmonaliev (yellow card) 60'; Mickels 70'	Stadium: Kuopio Football Stadium; Attendance: 2,980; Referee: Gal Leibovitz (Israel)

5 August 2026 Third qualifying round 1st leg	AGF (Denmark)	2–1	(Azerbaijan) Sabah	Randers, Denmark
20:30 AZT (UTC+4)	Bogere 32', 63'; Links (yellow card) 73'; Knudsen (yellow card) 74'	Report	Simić (yellow card) 37' (goal) 67'; Mickels (yellow card) 39'	Stadium: Randers Stadium; Attendance: 8,970; Referee: Rade Obrenovič (Slovenia)
Note: AGF played their home legs at the Cepheus Park in Randers, instead of their regular home ground, Ceres Park in Aarhus, which is undergoing major renovation.

11 August 2026 Third qualifying round 2nd leg	Sabah (Azerbaijan)	4–0 (5–2 agg.)	(Denmark) AGF	Masazir, Azerbaijan
20:00 AZT (UTC+4)	Simić 59'; Solvet 67'; Mickels 78'; Severina 89'	Report	Carstensen (yellow card) 8'; Andersen (yellow card) 32'; Kahl (yellow card) 66'	Stadium: Bank Respublika Arena; Attendance: 8,900; Referee: Willy Delajod (France)

19 August 2026 Play-off round 1st leg	Hapoel Be'er Sheva (Israel)	2–1	(Azerbaijan) Sabah	Bucharest, Romania
23:00 AZT (UTC+4)	East 43'; Vítor (yellow card) 76'; Rotman (yellow card) 77'; Zlatanović 79'; Ganah (yellow card) 85'	Report	Simić 6'	Stadium: Rapid-Giulești Stadium; Attendance: 1,048; Referee: Davide Massa (Italy)
Note: Due to the Gaza war, Israeli teams were required to play their home matches at neutral venues until further notice.

25 August 2026 Play-off round 2nd leg	Sabah (Azerbaijan)	5–2 (a.e.t.) (6–4 agg.)	(Israel) Hapoel Be'er Sheva	Baku, Azerbaijan
20:45 AZT (UTC+4)	Parris (yellow card) 21'; Nwachukwu 38'; Lepinjica (yellow card) 73'; Rakhmonaliev 74'; Mutallimov 90+4'; Mbina 101'; Mickels 115'	Report	Zlatanović 10'; Mizrahi 61'; Peretz (yellow card) 83' (yellow-red card) 117'; Diop (yellow card) 89' (yellow-red card) 100'; Malede (yellow card) 92'	Stadium: Tofiq Bahramov Republican Stadium; Attendance: 27,890; Referee: István Kovács (Romania)
Note: Sabah played their play-off round home leg at the Tofiq Bahramov Republican Stadium in Baku, instead of their regular home ground, Bank Respublika Arena in Masazir, which does not meet UEFA requirements for this stage.

==== League phase ====
Pos	Team	Pld	W	D	L	GF	GA	GD	Pts
29	(Greece) AEK Athens	4	1	0	3	5	11	−6	3
29	(Germany) RB Leipzig	4	1	0	3	5	11	−6	3
31	(Azerbaijan) Sabah	4	1	0	3	4	10	−6	3
32	(Netherlands) Feyenoord	4	1	0	3	4	11	−7	3
33	(France) Lens	4	1	0	3	4	16	−12	3

Updated to match(es) played on 4 November 2026. Source: UEFA
Rules for classification: League phase tiebreakers

10 September 2026 1	Manchester United (England)	4–0	(Azerbaijan) Sabah	Manchester, England
23:00 AZT (UTC+4)	Cunha 27'; Fernandes 42'; Šeško 45'; Dorgu (yellow card) 62'; Martínez 68'	Report	Lepinjica (yellow card) 67'	Stadium: Old Trafford; Attendance: 73,685; Referee: Willy Delajod (France)

13 October 2026 2	Sabah (Azerbaijan)	2–0	(Czech Republic) Slavia Prague	Baku, Azerbaijan
20:45 AZT (UTC+4)	Simić (yellow card) 14'; Parris 49'; Solvet (yellow card) 66'; Zedadka (yellow card) 74'; Mickels 88'	Report	Ayaosi (yellow card) 67'; Kubiak (yellow card) 77'	Stadium: Olympic Stadium; Attendance: 29,670; Referee: Sebastian Gishamer (Austria)
Note: Sabah played their home matches at Olympic Stadium, Baku, instead of their regular stadium, Bank Respublika Arena, Masazir, which does not meet UEFA requirements.

20 October 2026 3	Sabah (Azerbaijan)	1–2	(Germany) Borussia Dortmund	Baku, Azerbaijan
20:45 AZT (UTC+4)	Solvet (yellow card) 22'; McCarthy 39', (yellow card) 57'; Lepinjica (yellow card) 49'; Zedadka (yellow card) 89'	Report	Guirassy 10', 53'	Stadium: Olympic Stadium; Attendance: 47,221; Referee: Javier Alberola Rojas (Spain)
Note: Sabah played their home matches at Olympic Stadium, Baku, instead of their regular stadium, Bank Respublika Arena, Masazir, which does not meet UEFA requirements.

5 November 2026 4	Viking (Norway)	4–1	(Azerbaijan) Sabah	Stavanger, Norway
00:00 AZT (UTC+4)	Haugen (yellow card) 2'; Stensness (yellow card) 18'; Botheim 27', 90+4'; Tripić (penalty missed) 69', 69'; Falchener 81'	Report	Mbina 11'; Rakhmonaliev (yellow card) 36'; McCarthy (red card) 77'; Mickels (yellow card) 87'	Stadium: Viking Stadion; Attendance: 15,012; Referee: Sander van der Eijk (Netherlands)

25 November 2026 5	Sabah (Azerbaijan)	v	(Spain) Barcelona	Baku, Azerbaijan
21:45 AZT (UTC+4)				Stadium: Olympic Stadium
Note: Sabah will play their home matches at Olympic Stadium, Baku, instead of their regular stadium, Bank Respublika Arena, Masazir, which does not meet UEFA requirements.

8 December 2026 6	Villarreal (Spain)	v	(Azerbaijan) Sabah	Villarreal, Spain
21:45 AZT (UTC+4)				Stadium: Estadio de la Cerámica

20 January 2027 7	Sabah (Azerbaijan)	v	(Italy) Napoli	Baku, Azerbaijan
21:45 AZT (UTC+4)				Stadium: Olympic Stadium
Note: Sabah will play their home matches at Olympic Stadium, Baku, instead of their regular stadium, Bank Respublika Arena, Masazir, which does not meet UEFA requirements.

28 January 2027 8	Arsenal (England)	v	(Azerbaijan) Sabah	London, England
00:00 AZT (UTC+4)				Stadium: Emirates Stadium

== Squad statistics ==
As of match played 8 November 2026

=== Appearances and goals ===
No.	Pos	Nat	Player	Total		Premier League		Azerbaijan Cup		Champions League	
No.	Pos	Nat	Player	Apps	Goals	Apps	Goals	Apps	Goals	Apps	Goals
3	DF	(Guadeloupe) GLP	Steve Solvet	14	1	4	0	0	0	10	1
4	DF	(South Africa) RSA	Aden McCarthy	14	1	6+2	0	0	0	4+2	1
5	DF	(Azerbaijan) AZE	Rahman Dashdamirov	18	1	7	0	0	0	9+2	1
6	MF	(Azerbaijan) AZE	Abdulakh Khaybulayev	17	2	6+3	2	0	0	1+7	0
7	MF	(Uzbekistan) UZB	Umarali Rakhmonaliev	17	2	4+1	1	0	0	12	1
8	FW	(Nigeria) NGR	Christian Nwachukwu	15	2	5+3	1	0	0	3+4	1
9	MF	(Azerbaijan) AZE	Khayal Aliyev	2	0	0+1	0	0	0	0+1	0
10	MF	(Azerbaijan) AZE	Aleksey Isayev	19	2	5+4	2	0	0	7+3	0
11	MF	(Jamaica) JAM	Kaheem Parris	16	3	4+3	1	0	0	7+2	2
13	MF	(Croatia) CRO	Ivan Lepinjica	20	0	6+2	0	0	0	12	0
16	MF	(Azerbaijan) AZE	Rauf Rustamli	2	0	0+2	0	0	0	0	0
17	DF	(Azerbaijan) AZE	Tellur Mutallimov	8	1	5	0	0	0	0+3	1
18	FW	(Brazil) BRA	Carlos Eduardo	6	1	3+3	1	0	0	0	0
20	MF	(Rwanda) RWA	Joy-Lance Mickels	22	12	4+6	7	0	0	11+1	5
21	MF	(Serbia) SRB	Veljko Simić	18	8	5+1	2	0	0	12	6
23	MF	(France) FRA	Younes Lachaab	8	0	3+2	0	0	0	0+3	0
27	DF	(Poland) POL	Tymoteusz Puchacz	22	0	8+2	0	0	0	12	0
33	DF	(Brazil) BRA	Erivaldo Almeida	9	0	3+3	0	0	0	1+2	0
34	MF	(Curaçao) CUW	Xander Severina	14	3	3+2	2	0	0	1+8	1
35	DF	(Nigeria) NGR	Japhet Dungus	2	0	2	0	0	0	0	0
37	MF	(Brazil) BRA	Du Queiroz	11	0	5+2	0	0	0	2+2	0
80	DF	(Algeria) ALG	Akim Zedadka	17	0	5	0	0	0	12	0
88	MF	(Portugal) POR	Rodrigo Fernandes	9	0	3+2	0	0	0	0+4	0
92	GK	(Kazakhstan) KAZ	Stas Pokatilov	19	0	7	0	0	0	12	0
94	GK	(Azerbaijan) AZE	Ravan Mirzammadov	3	0	3	0	0	0	0	0
99	FW	(Gabon) GAB	Orphé Mbina	20	4	4+4	2	0	0	2+10	2
Players away on loan:
Players who left Sabah during the season:
19	FW	(France) FRA	Aaron Malouda	2	0	0	0	0	0	2	0

=== Goal scorers ===
Place	Position	Nation	Number	Name	Premier League	Azerbaijan Cup	Champions League	Total
1	MF	(Rwanda)	20	Joy-Lance Mickels	7	0	5	12
2	MF	(Serbia)	21	Veljko Simić	2	0	6	8
3	FW	(Gabon)	99	Orphé Mbina	2	0	2	4
4	MF	(Curaçao)	34	Xander Severina	2	0	1	3
4	MF	(Jamaica)	11	Kaheem Parris	1	0	2	3
6	MF	(Azerbaijan)	6	Abdulakh Khaybulayev	2	0	0	2
6	MF	(Azerbaijan)	10	Aleksey Isayev	2	0	0	2
6	FW	(Nigeria)	8	Christian Nwachukwu	1	0	1	2
6	MF	(Uzbekistan)	7	Umarali Rakhmonaliev	1	0	1	2
10	FW	(Brazil)	18	Carlos Eduardo	1	0	0	1
10	MF	(Azerbaijan)	5	Rahman Dashdamirov	0	0	1	1
10	DF	(Guadeloupe)	3	Steve Solvet	0	0	1	1
10	DF	(Azerbaijan)	17	Tellur Mutallimov	0	0	1	1
10	DF	(South Africa)	4	Aden McCarthy	0	0	1	1
10				Own goal	1	0	0	1
				TOTALS	22	0	22	44

=== Clean sheets ===
Place	Position	Nation	Number	Name	Premier League	Azerbaijan Cup	Champions League	Total
1	GK	(Kazakhstan)	92	Stas Pokatilov	4	0	5	9
2	GK	(Azerbaijan)	94	Ravan Mirzammadov	3	0	0	3
				TOTALS	7	0	5	12

=== Disciplinary record ===
Number	Nation	Position	Name	Premier League		Azerbaijan Cup		Champions League		Total	
Number	Nation	Position	Name	Yellow card	Red card	Yellow card	Red card	Yellow card	Red card	Yellow card	Red card
3	(Guadeloupe)	DF	Steve Solvet	0	0	0	0	4	1	4	1
4	(South Africa)	DF	Aden McCarthy	1	0	0	0	1	1	2	1
7	(Uzbekistan)	MF	Umarali Rakhmonaliev	0	0	0	0	2	0	2	0
8	(Nigeria)	FW	Christian Nwachukwu	1	0	0	0	0	0	1	0
11	(Jamaica)	MF	Kaheem Parris	0	0	0	0	2	0	2	0
13	(Croatia)	MF	Ivan Lepinjica	1	0	0	0	4	0	5	0
20	(Rwanda)	MF	Joy-Lance Mickels	0	0	0	0	3	0	3	0
21	(Serbia)	MF	Veljko Simić	1	0	0	0	2	0	3	0
27	(Poland)	DF	Tymoteusz Puchacz	2	0	0	0	0	0	2	0
33	(Brazil)	DF	Erivaldo Almeida	1	0	0	0	0	0	1	0
35	(Nigeria)	DF	Japhet Dungus	1	0	0	0	0	0	1	0
37	(Brazil)	MF	Du Queiroz	3	0	0	0	0	0	3	0
80	(Algeria)	DF	Akim Zedadka	1	0	0	0	3	0	4	0
88	(Portugal)	MF	Rodrigo Fernandes	1	0	0	0	0	0	1	0
Players away on loan:
Players who left Sabah during the season:
			TOTALS	13	0	0	0	21	2	34	2
