= List of Azerbaijan football transfers summer 2026 =

This is a list of Azerbaijani football transfers for the 2026 summer transfer window. Only transfers featuring Azerbaijan Premier League are listed.

== Azerbaijan Premier League 2026-27 ==
=== Araz-Naxçıvan ===
In: Note: Flags indicate national team as defined under FIFA eligibility rules; some limited exceptions apply. Players may hold more than one non-FIFA nationality.

No.	Pos.	Nation	Player
1	GK	BRA	Arthur (from (Indonesia) Semen Padang)
2	DF	AZE	Abdulla Rzayev (on loan from (Azerbaijan) Sabah)
5	DF	CRO	Luka Dumančić (from (Indonesia) Persis Solo)
7	MF	AZE	Rövlan Muradov (from (Azerbaijan) Zira)
9	FW	AZE	Agadadash Salyanski (on loan from (Azerbaijan) Neftçi)
11	FW	GUI	Mohamed Mara (from (Thailand) Kanchanaburi Power)
13	MF	AZE	Qabil Alizada (from (Azerbaijan) Mingəçevir)
19	FW	BDI	Sudi Abdallah (from (Indonesia) Persijap Jepara)
22	DF	AZE	Rashad Hasanov (from (Azerbaijan) Jabrayil)
23	MF	ESP	Alberto Fernández (from (Cyprus) Akritas Chlorakas)
27	DF	BIH	Bojan Letić (from (Bosnia and Herzegovina) Sloga Doboj)
29	MF	AZE	Ceyhun Nuriyev (from (Azerbaijan) Zira)
36	MF	GUI	Mamadou Kané (from (Cyprus) Pafos)
77	MF	AZE	Nihat Mehralıyev (from (Azerbaijan) Şamaxı)
—	MF	COL	Alejandro Herrera (from (Dominican Republic) San Cristóbal)

Out: Note: Flags indicate national team as defined under FIFA eligibility rules; some limited exceptions apply. Players may hold more than one non-FIFA nationality.

No.	Pos.	Nation	Player
3	DF	AZE	Bekhtiyar Hasanalizade (to (Azerbaijan) İmişli)
4	DF	AZE	Rahil Mammadov (to (Azerbaijan) Turan Tovuz)
5	DF	AZE	Slavik Alxasov (to (Azerbaijan) Sabail)
7	FW	FRA	Hamidou Keyta
8	MF	AZE	Coşqun Diniyev
9	MF	MAR	Ayyoub Allach
10	MF	BEN	Felipe Santos (to (Thailand) Bangkok United)
11	FW	GER	Ba-Muaka Simakala (to (Belgium) Eupen)
12	GK	MDA	Cristian Avram (to (Moldova) Petrocub)
16	FW	BRA	Ramon Machado (to (Malaysia) Star City)
19	MF	ISR	Bar Cohen (to (Israel) Ironi Tiberias)
23	FW	POR	Nuno Rodrigues (to (Romania) Voluntari)
29	MF	BRA	Wanderson Maranhão
34	DF	AZE	Ürfan Abbasov (to (Azerbaijan) Kapaz)

=== Gabala ===
In: Note: Flags indicate national team as defined under FIFA eligibility rules; some limited exceptions apply. Players may hold more than one non-FIFA nationality.

No.	Pos.	Nation	Player
3	DF	BRA	Edson Eduardo (from (Iceland) Vestri)
5	DF	COD	Nathan Monzango (from (Slovenia) Bravo)
7	FW	POR	Bruno Silva (from (Portugal) Oliveirense)
9	FW	SUI	Karim Rossi (from (Azerbaijan) Şamaxı)
12	DF	CIV	Kouya Mabea (from (Malta) Floriana)
19	MF	AZE	Khayyam Mammadli (from (Azerbaijan) Baku Sporting)
32	GK	BRA	Arthur Motta (on loan from (Bulgaria) Beroe)
80	MF	NGR	Meshack Ubochioma (from (Hungary) Kazincbarcikai)
81	DF	AZE	Samir Ağayev (from (Azerbaijan) Zira)

Out: Note: Flags indicate national team as defined under FIFA eligibility rules; some limited exceptions apply. Players may hold more than one non-FIFA nationality.

No.	Pos.	Nation	Player
3	DF	BRA	Eduardo Kunde (to (Cyprus) Olympiakos Nicosia)
4	MF	NGR	Salihu Nasiru (to (Nigeria) Kano Pillars)
6	MF	AZE	Emil Süleymanov (to (Azerbaijan) Şamaxı)
7	DF	AZE	Turan Manafov (loan return to (South Africa) Stellenbosch)
8	DF	FRA	Sambou Sissoko (loan return to (France) Valenciennes)
12	FW	FRA	Ibrahim Sangaré
14	FW	CGO	Domi Massoumou (to (Armenia) Alashkert)
23	DF	AZE	Rufat Ahmadov (loan return to (Azerbaijan) Turan Tovuz)
28	DF	AZE	Murad Musayev (to (Azerbaijan) Shafa Baku)
30	FW	GHA	Prince Owusu (to (Slovakia) DAC 1904)
33	DF	SEN	Seydina Keita (to (Lithuania) Panevėžys)
50	FW	CIV	Adriel Ba Loua (to (South Korea) Gwangju)
71	FW	AZE	Senan Ağalarov (to (Azerbaijan) Sabail)
91	DF	AZE	Jeyhun Bagirzade (to (Azerbaijan) Şamaxı)
93	GK	AZE	Rza Jafarov (loan return to (Azerbaijan) Neftçi)
—	MF	AZE	Okan Tahmazli (to (Azerbaijan) Şamaxı)

=== İmişli ===
In: Note: Flags indicate national team as defined under FIFA eligibility rules; some limited exceptions apply. Players may hold more than one non-FIFA nationality.

No.	Pos.	Nation	Player
1	GK	AZE	Yusif İmanov (from (Azerbaijan) Kapaz)
14	DF	AZE	Bekhtiyar Hasanalizade (from (Azerbaijan) Araz-Naxçıvan)
17	FW	AZE	Seykhan Farajov (from (Azerbaijan) MOIK Baku)
22	GK	AZE	Sadig Mammadzade (from (Azerbaijan) Qarabağ)
77	MF	AZE	Farid Nabiyev (from (Azerbaijan) Kapaz)

Out: Note: Flags indicate national team as defined under FIFA eligibility rules; some limited exceptions apply. Players may hold more than one non-FIFA nationality.

No.	Pos.	Nation	Player
1	GK	AZE	Huseynali Guliyev (to (Azerbaijan) Zira)
17	MF	GHA	Ezekiel Morgan (to (Azerbaijan) Sabail)
21	MF	AZE	Abbas Aghazade (to (Azerbaijan) Sabail)
33	GK	BLR	Andrey Sinenko
77	MF	AZE	Elmir Rahimzade
80	MF	AZE	Riad Abbaszada
94	DF	BRA	Rafael Viegas
97	FW	AZE	Khazar Mahmudov

=== Kapaz ===
In: Note: Flags indicate national team as defined under FIFA eligibility rules; some limited exceptions apply. Players may hold more than one non-FIFA nationality.

No.	Pos.	Nation	Player
1	GK	POR	Rogerio Santos (from (Israel) Ironi Tiberias)
6	MF	AZE	Vadim Abdullayev (from (Azerbaijan) Karvan)
7	MF	AZE	Namiq Ələsgərov (from (Azerbaijan) Zira)
9	MF	ZAM	Kenneth Kalunga (from (Azerbaijan) Mingəçevir)
21	FW	POR	Asumah Abubakar (from Austria Lustenau)
33	FW	NGR	Benito (from (Cyprus) Akritas Chlorakas)
34	DF	AZE	Ürfan Abbasov (from (Azerbaijan) Araz-Naxçıvan)
—	MF	BEL	Desmond Acquah (from (Belgium) Dender)
—	DF	KOS	David Domgjoni (from (Israel) Hapoel Jerusalem)

Out: Note: Flags indicate national team as defined under FIFA eligibility rules; some limited exceptions apply. Players may hold more than one non-FIFA nationality.

No.	Pos.	Nation	Player
5	DF	AZE	Rauf Hüseynli (to (Azerbaijan) Shafa Baku)
6	MF	AZE	Jamal Jafarov (to (Kyrgyzstan) Alay)
7	MF	AZE	Ehtiram Şahverdiyev (to (Azerbaijan) Sabail)
9	FW	BRA	Pachu (to (Bolivia) Strongest)
10	MF	JPN	Ryonosuke Ohori (loan return to (Azerbaijan) Neftçi)
22	GK	AZE	Mammad Hüseynov (to (Azerbaijan) Shafa Baku)
24	MF	NGR	Olawale Onanuga (to (Bahrain) Al Ahli)
33	GK	AZE	Yusif İmanov (to (Azerbaijan) İmişli)
77	MF	AZE	Farid Nabiyev (to (Azerbaijan) İmişli)

=== Neftçi ===
In: Note: Flags indicate national team as defined under FIFA eligibility rules; some limited exceptions apply. Players may hold more than one non-FIFA nationality.

No.	Pos.	Nation	Player
3	DF	AZE	Rufat Abbasov (from (Azerbaijan) Şamaxı)
10	MF	VEN	Freddy Vargas (from (Israel) Maccabi Netanya, previously on loan)
11	MF	HUN	Alen Skribek (from (Hungary) Zalaegerszeg)
20	MF	BRA	Gustavo Klismahn (from (Portugal) Santa Clara)
22	MF	SUR	Denzel Jubitana (from (Greece) Atromitos)
27	MF	SRB	Dragoljub Savić (from (Serbia) TSC)
29	FW	SVK	Ľubomír Tupta (from (Greece) AE Larissa)
55	DF	GLP	Andreaw Gravillon (from (Italy) Pescara)
88	MF	CRO	Vicko Ševelj (from (Scotland) Dundee United)
93	GK	AZE	Rza Jafarov (loan return from (Azerbaijan) Qabala)

Out: Note: Flags indicate national team as defined under FIFA eligibility rules; some limited exceptions apply. Players may hold more than one non-FIFA nationality.

No.	Pos.	Nation	Player
11	FW	FRA	Imad Faraj (to (Tunisia) ES Tunis)
13	GK	BIH	Kenan Pirić (to (Latvia) Riga)
14	DF	MNE	Edvin Kuč (to (Kosovo) Ballkani)
19	FW	AZE	Agadadash Salyanski (on loan to (Azerbaijan) Araz-Naxçıvan)
22	MF	PAR	Luis Ortíz (loan return to (Paraguay) Sportivo Ameliano)
23	MF	ECU	Jordan Rezabala
27	DF	ROU	Cristian Costin (to (Romania) Chindia Târgoviște)
28	FW	LUX	Alessio Curci
45	FW	CMR	Vincent Aboubakar (to (Turkey) Bodrum)
47	MF	AZE	Murad Mammadov (to (Cyprus) Pafos)
—	MF	JPN	Ryonosuke Ohori (to (Serbia) Radnik Surdulica, previously on loan to (Azerbaijan) Kapaz)

=== Qarabağ ===
In: Note: Flags indicate national team as defined under FIFA eligibility rules; some limited exceptions apply. Players may hold more than one non-FIFA nationality.

No.	Pos.	Nation	Player
4	DF	HUN	Bence Várkonyi (from (Hungary) Zalaegerszegi)
5	DF	MOZ	Bruno Langa (from (Spain) Almería)
7	MF	FRA	Jaly Mouaddib (from (Cyprus) Omonia Aradippou)
9	FW	SWE	Zakaria Sawo (from (Sweden) Djurgården)
11	MF	GER	Reda Khadra (from (France) Stade de Reims)
19	FW	NGR	Taofeek Ismaheel (from (Poland) Górnik Zabrze)
23	GK	BIH	Martin Zlomislić (from (Croatia) Rijeka)
25	DF	LAT	Cebrail Makreckis (from (Hungary) Ferencváros)
29	MF	JAM	Renaldo Cephas (from (Russia) Pari Nizhny Novgorod)
33	MF	BRA	Diego Rosa (on loan from (Cyprus) APOEL)
88	MF	POR	Samuel Lobato (from (Portugal) Portimonense)

Out: Note: Flags indicate national team as defined under FIFA eligibility rules; some limited exceptions apply. Players may hold more than one non-FIFA nationality.

No.	Pos.	Nation	Player
3	DF	MAR	Samy Mmaee (loan return to (Croatia) Dinamo Zagreb)
10	MF	FRA	Abdellah Zoubir (to (Saudi Arabia) Al-Orobah)
11	MF	GHA	Emmanuel Addai (to (Belgium) OH Leuven)
12	GK	AZE	Sadig Mammadzade (to (Azerbaijan) İmişli)
15	MF	CPV	Leandro Andrade (to (Ukraine) Polissya)
17	FW	COL	Camilo Durán (to (Scotland) Celtic)
18	DF	BRA	Dani Bolt (to (Malaysia) Johor Darul Ta'zim)
27	DF	AZE	Toral Bayramov (to (Turkey) Bursaspor)
77	FW	AZE	Ramil Sheydayev (to (Russia) Sochi)
81	DF	COL	Kevin Medina (to (Malaysia) Johor Darul)
89	GK	AZE	Amin Ramazanov (to (Azerbaijan) Sabah)
97	GK	CRO	Fabijan Buntić (to (Portugal) Farense)

=== Sabah ===
In: Note: Flags indicate national team as defined under FIFA eligibility rules; some limited exceptions apply. Players may hold more than one non-FIFA nationality.

No.	Pos.	Nation	Player
1	GK	AZE	Amin Ramazanov (from (Azerbaijan) Qarabağ)
4	DF	RSA	Aden McCarthy (from (South Africa) Kaizer Chiefs)
16	MF	AZE	Rauf Rustamli (loan return from (Azerbaijan) Karvan)
21	MF	SRB	Veljko Simić (from (Turkey) Sivasspor, previously on loan)
23	MF	FRA	Younes Lachaab (on loan from (France) Lille)
27	DF	POL	Tymoteusz Puchacz (from (Germany) Holstein Kiel, previously on loan)
33	DF	BRA	Erivaldo Almeida (from (Portugal) Marítimo)
34	MF	CUW	Xander Severina (from (Israel) Maccabi Haifa)
37	MF	BRA	Du Queiroz (on loan from (Russia) Zenit St.Petersburg)
88	MF	POR	Rodrigo Fernandes (from (Azerbaijan) Şamaxı)
99	FW	GAB	Orphé Mbina (from (Slovenia) Maribor, previously on loan)

Out: Note: Flags indicate national team as defined under FIFA eligibility rules; some limited exceptions apply. Players may hold more than one non-FIFA nationality.

No.	Pos.	Nation	Player
2	DF	AZE	Amin Seydiyev (to (Azerbaijan) Zira)
18	FW	SVK	Pavol Šafranko (to (Slovakia) Dunajská Streda)
19	FW	FRA	Aaron Malouda (to (Switzerland) Basel)
40	DF	BRA	Ygor Nogueira (to (Russia) Rostov)
53	DF	BRA	Andrey Santos (loan to (Georgia (country)) Iberia)
55	GK	AZE	Nicat Mehbalıyev (to (Azerbaijan) Shafa Baku)
70	MF	NGR	Jesse Sekidika (to (South Korea) Gangwon)
83	FW	NGR	Stephen Ende (to (Georgia (country)) Iberia)
—	DF	AZE	Abdulla Rzayev (on loan to Araz-Naxçıvan, previously on loan to (Azerbaijan) Şamaxı)

=== Shafa ===
In: Note: Flags indicate national team as defined under FIFA eligibility rules; some limited exceptions apply. Players may hold more than one non-FIFA nationality.

No.	Pos.	Nation	Player
1	GK	AZE	Nicat Mehbalıyev (from (Azerbaijan) Sabah)
4	DF	GAM	Maudo Jarjué (from (North Macedonia) Struga)
5	DF	AZE	Arsen Agjabayov (from (Azerbaijan) Şamaxı)
6	MF	AZE	Farid Yusifli (from (Azerbaijan) Turan Tovuz)
7	FW	CAN	Tray Fuller (from (Georgia (country)) Dila Gori)
8	MF	ROU	Vlad Pop (from (Romania) Unirea Slobozia)
9	FW	BRA	Luís Felipe (from (Albania) Vora)
10	MF	NED	Dylan Mertens (from (Netherlands) Telstar)
11	DF	ROU	Andrei Dragu (from (Romania) Unirea Slobozia)
17	MF	CIV	Moussa Guel (from (North Macedonia) Tikvesh)
18	FW	GUI	Bafodé Dansoko (from (Switzerland) Winterthur)
22	DF	FRA	Oumar Diaw (from (Belgium) RE Acren-Lessines)
28	DF	AZE	Murad Musayev (from (Azerbaijan) Gabala)
34	DF	NED	Christopher Mamengi (from (Kosovo) Prishtina)
55	DF	AZE	Rauf Hüseynli (from (Azerbaijan) Kapaz)
99	GK	AZE	Mammad Hüseynov (from (Azerbaijan) Kapaz)

Out: Note: Flags indicate national team as defined under FIFA eligibility rules; some limited exceptions apply. Players may hold more than one non-FIFA nationality.

No.	Pos.	Nation	Player
8	MF	AZE	Urfan Ismayilov
9	FW	AZE	Ibrahim Aliyev
10	MF	AZE	Emin Zamanov
11	MF	AZE	Agil Nasibov
13	GK	AZE	Ali Hasanli
14	DF	AZE	Vugar Hasanov
18	MF	AZE	Elvin Ismayilov
21	DF	AZE	Novruz Mammadov
22	DF	AZE	Huseyn Mursalov
70	MF	AZE	Ruslan Hajiyev
80	DF	AZE	Zahid Mardanov
88	MF	AZE	Agshin Pashayev
99	FW	IRI	Amir Ebrahimzadeh

=== Shamakhi ===
In: Note: Flags indicate national team as defined under FIFA eligibility rules; some limited exceptions apply. Players may hold more than one non-FIFA nationality.

No.	Pos.	Nation	Player
7	MF	AZE	Emil Süleymanov (from (Azerbaijan) Qabala)
3	DF	POR	João Oliveira (from (Portugal) São João de Ver)
4	DF	POR	Rui Pacheco (from (Portugal) Paredes)
8	MF	ISR	David Dego (from (Israel) Ironi Modi'in)
14	FW	AZE	Ugur Jahangirov (from (Azerbaijan) Karvan)
52	DF	BEN	Abdoul Rachid Moumini (from (Azerbaijan) Sumgayit)
66	DF	AZE	Jeyhun Bagirzade (from (Azerbaijan) Gabala)
77	MF	AZE	Okan Tahmazli (from (Azerbaijan) Gabala)
80	DF	AZE	Hajiali Shiraliyev (from (Azerbaijan) Difai Agsu)
96	GK	AZE	Nijat Qaragozlu (from (Azerbaijan) Neftçi-2)
—	DF	AZE	Emin Rustamov (from (Azerbaijan) Sabail)

Out: Note: Flags indicate national team as defined under FIFA eligibility rules; some limited exceptions apply. Players may hold more than one non-FIFA nationality.

No.	Pos.	Nation	Player
2	DF	AZE	Abdulla Rzayev (loan return to (Azerbaijan) Sabah)
3	DF	UKR	Vladyslav Veremeev (to (Armenia) Urartu)
4	DF	BRA	Cézar (to (Armenia) Alashkert)
5	DF	AZE	Arsen Agjabayov (to (Azerbaijan) Shafa Baku)
8	MF	TAN	Alphonce Msanga (to (Algeria) JS Kabylie)
9	FW	SUI	Karim Rossi (to (Azerbaijan) Qabala)
10	MF	ROU	Andrei Tîrcoveanu
11	FW	POR	Diogo Balau (to (Azerbaijan) Turan Tovuz)
14	DF	AZE	Ravil Gafarov
17	DF	AZE	Rafael Maharramli
21	MF	AZE	Bilal Ismayilov
44	DF	BRA	David
48	MF	AZE	Ramiz Muradov (loan return to (Azerbaijan) Zira)
77	FW	AZE	Nihat Mehraliyev (to (Azerbaijan) Araz-Naxçıvan)
82	DF	AZE	Rufat Abbasov (to (Azerbaijan) Neftçi)
88	MF	POR	Rodrigo Fernandes (to (Azerbaijan) Sabah)
99	GK	AZE	Salim Hashimov (loan return to (Azerbaijan) Zira)
90	FW	AZE	Davud Mansimov (loan return to (Azerbaijan) Qarabağ-2)

=== Sumgayit ===
In: Note: Flags indicate national team as defined under FIFA eligibility rules; some limited exceptions apply. Players may hold more than one non-FIFA nationality.

No.	Pos.	Nation	Player
1	GK	BRA	Jeimes (from (Portugal) Paços de Ferreira)
5	DF	BRA	Renan Santana (from (Portugal) Famalicão)
9	FW	BRA	Jean (from (Brazil) Caxias)
21	DF	POR	Tiago Almeida (from (Portugal) Chaves)
29	MF	AZE	Emil Mustafayev (from (Ukraine) Polissya Zhytomyr, previously on loan)
55	MF	BRA	Lucas Black (from (Brazil) Ferroviário)

Out: Note: Flags indicate national team as defined under FIFA eligibility rules; some limited exceptions apply. Players may hold more than one non-FIFA nationality.

No.	Pos.	Nation	Player
1	GK	AZE	Mekhti Dzhenetov (to (Azerbaijan) Sabail)
7	FW	MAD	Alexandre Ramalingom (to (Indonesia) Persita Tangerang)
25	DF	BEN	Abdoul Rachid Moumini (to (Azerbaijan) Shamakhi)
33	DF	UKR	Danylo Beskorovaynyi (loan return to (Ukraine) Polissya Zhytomyr)
72	DF	FRA	Rayan Senhadji (to (Kazakhstan) Tobol)

=== Turan Tovuz ===
In: Note: Flags indicate national team as defined under FIFA eligibility rules; some limited exceptions apply. Players may hold more than one non-FIFA nationality.

No.	Pos.	Nation	Player
4	DF	AZE	Rahil Mammadov (from (Azerbaijan) Araz-Naxçıvan)
11	FW	POR	Diogo Balau (from (Azerbaijan) Şamaxı)
21	MF	FRA	Steeve Beusnard (from (France) Pau)
33	DF	SRB	Filip Damjanović (from (Slovenia) Koper)
35	GK	RUS	Aleksei Kenyaykin (from (Russia) Rubin Kazan)
—	DF	AZE	Rufat Ahmadov (loan return from (Azerbaijan) Qabala)

Out: Note: Flags indicate national team as defined under FIFA eligibility rules; some limited exceptions apply. Players may hold more than one non-FIFA nationality.

No.	Pos.	Nation	Player
4	DF	AZE	Şehriyar Aliyev
6	MF	AZE	Farid Yusifli (to (Azerbaijan) Shafa Baku)
11	MF	AZE	Aykhan Guseynov (to (Azerbaijan) Zira)
26	MF	AZE	Filip Ozobić (to (Croatia) Mladost Ždralovi)
39	MF	AZE	Tural Bayramlı
41	GK	RUS	Sergei Samok (to (Russia) Veles Moscow)

=== Zira ===
In: Note: Flags indicate national team as defined under FIFA eligibility rules; some limited exceptions apply. Players may hold more than one non-FIFA nationality.

No.	Pos.	Nation	Player
1	GK	BRA	Maycon Cleiton (from (Portugal) Portimonense)
2	DF	AZE	Amin Seydiyev (from (Azerbaijan) Sabah)
17	MF	POR	Vierinha (from (Cyprus) Olympiakos Nicosia)
22	MF	AZE	Aykhan Guseynov (from (Azerbaijan) Turan Tovuz)
23	FW	JAM	Damaine Smith (from (United Arab Emirates) Nova Star)
27	FW	CIV	Bayéré Junior Loué (from (Serbia) Javor Ivanjica)
29	MF	CIV	Chris Digbeu (from (France) Valenciennes B)
48	MF	AZE	Ramiz Muradov (loan return from (Azerbaijan) Şamaxı)
72	GK	AZE	Huseynali Guliyev (from (Azerbaijan) İmişli)
99	GK	AZE	Salim Hashimov (loan return from (Azerbaijan) Şamaxı)

Out: Note: Flags indicate national team as defined under FIFA eligibility rules; some limited exceptions apply. Players may hold more than one non-FIFA nationality.

No.	Pos.	Nation	Player
6	MF	UKR	Eldar Kuliyev (to (Georgia (country)) Iberia)
7	MF	AZE	Rövlan Muradov (to (Azerbaijan) Araz-Naxçıvan)
11	MF	BRA	Martins Júnior (to (Cambodia) Preah Khan Reach Svay Rieng)
16	DF	AZE	Fuad Bayramov (to (Azerbaijan) Sabail)
17	MF	FRA	Iron Gomis (to (France) Troyes)
19	MF	AZE	Rufat Abdullazade (loan return to (Croatia) NK Varaždin)
26	DF	CIV	Stephane Acka
28	FW	RWA	Leroy-Jacques Mickels (to (Germany) Waldhof Mannheim)
29	MF	AZE	Ceyhun Nuriyev (to (Azerbaijan) Araz-Naxçıvan)
70	MF	AZE	Namiq Ələsgərov (to (Azerbaijan) Kapaz)
73	FW	AZE	Anatoliy Nuriyev (to (Hungary) Kisvárda)
93	MF	FRA	Brahim Konaté (to (Cyprus) Nea Salamis)
97	GK	POR	Tiago Silva
