= Nycollas Queiroz =

Brazilian footballer (born 1997)

Personal information
- Full name: Nycollas Queiroz de Sousa
- Date of birth: 7 December 2002 (age 23)
- Place of birth: São Paulo, Brazil
- Height: 1.86 m (6 ft 1 in)
- Position: Forward

Youth career
- 2017: América-SP
- 2018–2019: Audax
- 2020–2023: Portuguesa
- 2021–2022: → Cruzeiro (loan)
- 2022–2023: → Fortaleza (loan)

Senior career*
Years	Team	Apps	(Gls)
2023–2025	Portuguesa	0	(0)
2024	→ Brasil de Pelotas (loan)	11	(0)
- * Club domestic league appearances and goals as of 18:17, 26 August 2024 (UTC)

Nycollas Queiroz de Sousa (born 7 December 2002) is a Brazilian footballer who plays as a forward.

== Career ==
Born in São Paulo, Queiroz represented América-SP and Audax before joining Portuguesa's youth setup in 2020. In March 2021, he renewed his contract with the club until 2025 and was loaned to Cruzeiro in June, being assigned to the under-20 team.

Back to Lusa in March 2022, Queiroz was announced on loan at Fortaleza's under-20 team on 28 April. He returned to Portuguesa in April 2023 after his loan expired, and made his first team debut on 1 July, coming on as a late substitute for goalscorer Chrigor in a 4–0 home routing of Santo André, for the year's Copa Paulista.

On 21 November 2023, Queiroz was officially presented at Brasil de Pelotas, on loan for one year.

== Personal life ==
Queiroz is the cousin of Du Queiroz, also a footballer.

== Career statistics ==
As of 26 August 2024

Club	Season	League			State League		Cup		Continental		Other		Total	
Club	Season	Division	Apps	Goals	Apps	Goals	Apps	Goals	Apps	Goals	Apps	Goals	Apps	Goals
Portuguesa	2023	Paulista	—		0	0	—		—		4 (Note: Appearance(s) in Copa Paulista)	0	4	0
Brasil de Pelotas (loan)	2024	Série D	9	0	2	0	0	0	—		—		11	0
Career total			9	0	2	0	0	0	0	0	4	0	15	0
