= Carlos Eduardo (footballer, born 2002) =

Brazilian footballer

Personal information
- Full name: Carlos Eduardo Borges Parente
- Date of birth: August 10, 2002 (age 24)
- Place of birth: São João do Piauí, Brazil
- Height: 1.92 m (6 ft 3 1/2 in)
- Position: Forward

Team information
- Current team: Sabah (on loan from Gil Vicente)

Youth career
- 2019–2020: Brusque
- 2021: Nacional

Senior career*
Years	Team	Apps	(Gls)
2020–2021	Brusque	1	(0)
2021–2024	Marítimo B	36	(9)
2023–2024	Marítimo	2	(0)
2024–2025	Felgueiras	25	(13)
2025–	Gil Vicente	24	(2)
2026–	→ Sabah (loan)	0	(0)
- * Club domestic league appearances and goals as of 6 September 2026

Carlos Eduardo Borges Parente (born 10 August 2002), known as Carlos Eduardo, is a Brazilian professional footballer who plays as a forward for Azerbaijan Premier League club Sabah on loan from Primeira Liga club Gil Vicente.

== Club career ==
A youth product of the Brazilian club Brusque, Carlos Eduardo moved to Portugal in 2021 with Nacional, followed by the academy of Marítimo. He debuted with the senior Marítimo in 2023, and on 10 July 2024 joined Liga 3 side Felgueiras and helped them get promoted in his first season. On 24 January 2025, he signed with Primeira Liga club Gil Vicente on a contract until 2028.

On 8 September 2026, Carlos Eduardo was loaned, with an option to buy, to Azerbaijani club Sabah, making their debut in the group stage of the UEFA Champions League, facing Manchester United, Barcelona, Arsenal and Borussia Dortmund, among others.
