= Yusif İmanov =

Azerbaijani footballer (born 2002)

Personal information
- Full name: Yusif Bəhruz oğlu İmanov
- Date of birth: 27 September 2002 (age 24)
- Place of birth: Ağdam, Azerbaijan
- Height: 1.92 m (6 ft 4 in)
- Position: Goalkeeper

Team information
- Current team: Kapaz
- Number: 33

Youth career
- Sabah

Senior career*
Years	Team	Apps	(Gls)
2022–2025	Sabah	80	(0)
2025	Malisheva	0	(0)
2025–	Kapaz	18	(0)

International career^{‡}
2022–2024	Azerbaijan U21	5	(0)
2023–	Azerbaijan	1	(0)
- * Club domestic league appearances and goals as of 22 June 2026 ‡ National team caps and goals as of 10 September 2024

Yusif Bəhruz oğlu İmanov (born 27 September 2002) is an Azerbaijani professional footballer who plays as a goalkeeper for Azerbaijan Premier League club Kapaz and the Azerbaijan national team.

== Career ==
=== Club ===
On 19 March 2022, İmanov made his debut in the Azerbaijan Premier League for Sabah against Sabail.

== Career statistics ==
=== Club ===
As of match played 22 September 2024

Appearances and goals by club, season and competition
Club	Season	League			Azerbaijan Cup		Continental		Total	
Club	Season	Division	Apps	Goals	Apps	Goals	Apps	Goals	Apps	Goals
Sabah	2020-21	Azerbaijan Premier League	0	0	0	0	—		0	0
Sabah	2021-22	Azerbaijan Premier League	8	0	0	0	—		8	0
Sabah	2022-23	Azerbaijan Premier League	33	0	2	0	—		35	0
Sabah	2023-24	Azerbaijan Premier League	24	0	3	0	4 (Note: Appearance(S) in UEFA Europa League)	0	31	0
Sabah	2024-25	Azerbaijan Premier League	6	0	0	0	4	0	10	0
Career total			71	0	5	0	8	0	84	0

=== International ===
As of match played 24 March 2024

Appearances and goals by national team and year
National team	Year	Apps	Goals
Azerbaijan	2023	1	0
Total		1	0
