= Stas Pokatilov =

Kazakhstani footballer

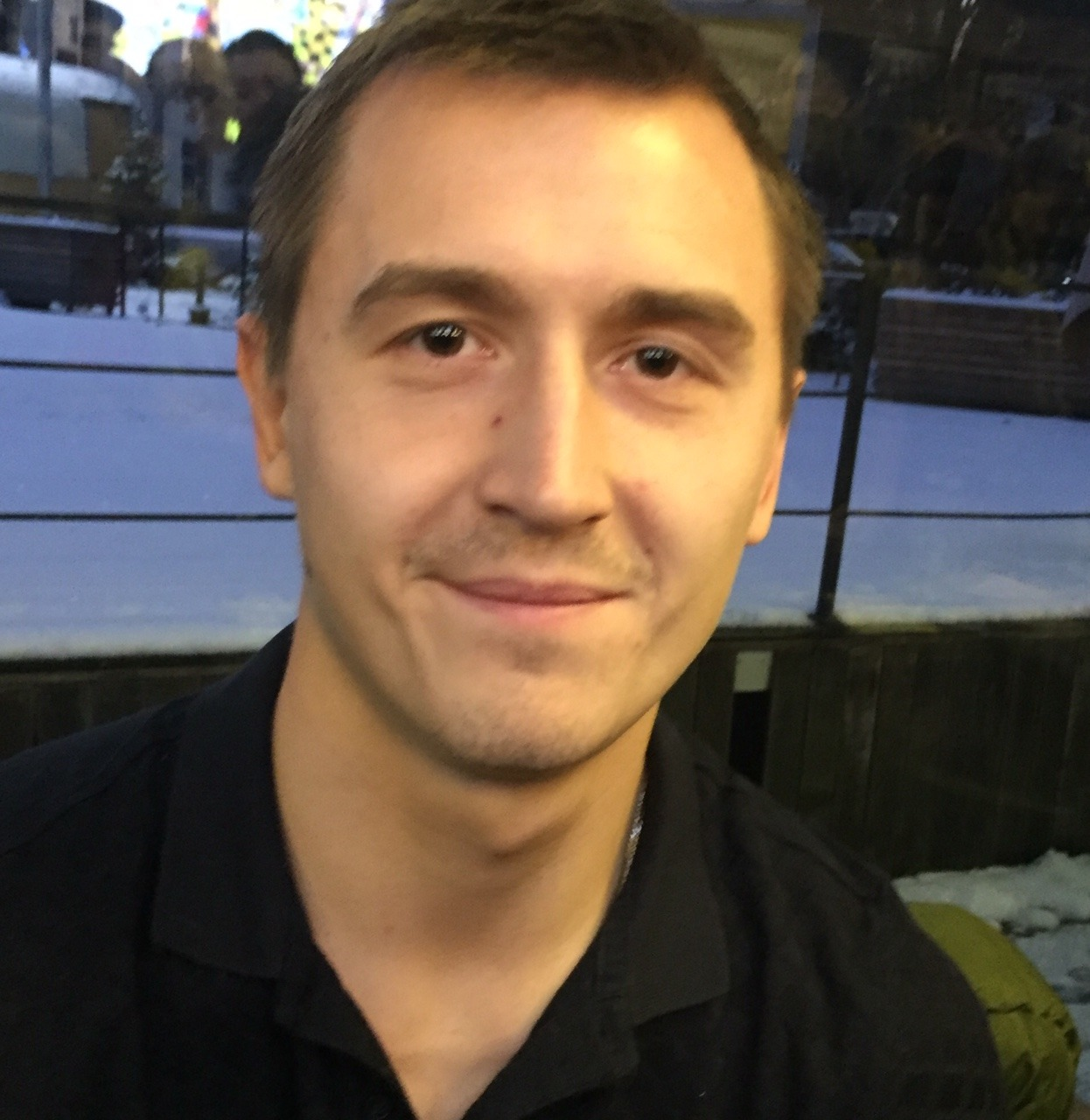
- Pokatilov in 2018

Personal information
- Full name: Stas Aleksandrovich Pokatilov
- Date of birth: 8 December 1992 (age 33)
- Place of birth: Oral, Kazakhstan
- Height: 1.90 m (6 ft 3 in)
- Position: Goalkeeper

Team information
- Current team: Sabah
- Number: 92

Senior career*
Years	Team	Apps	(Gls)
2012–2013	Akzhayik	14	(0)
2013–2014	Shakhter Karagandy	16	(0)
2015–2016	Aktobe	32	(0)
2016	Rostov	0	(0)
2016	→ Kairat (loan)	8	(0)
2016–2022	FC Kairat	111	(0)
2022–2024	Aktobe	45	(0)
2024–2025	Tobol	24	(0)
2025–	Sabah	48	(0)

International career^{‡}
2015–	Kazakhstan	33	(0)
- * Club domestic league appearances and goals as of 9 October 2026 ‡ National team caps and goals as of 18 November 2026

Stas Aleksandrovich Pokatilov (Russian: Стас Александрович Покатилов; born 8 December 1992) is a Kazakhstani professional footballer who plays as a goalkeeper for Azerbaijan Premier League club Sabah and the Kazakhstan national team.

== Career ==
On 30 December 2014, Pokatilov signed a two-year contract with Aktobe. On 26 February 2016, Rostov announced they had signed Pokatilov. On 4 July 2016, Pokatilov signed for Kairat on loan until the end of the 2016 season. At the end of the season 2016, Pokatilov moved to Kairat on a permanent deal from Rostov, signing a three-year contract on 13 December 2016.

On 25 November 2019, Pokatilov signed a new three-year contract with Kairat. On 19 January 2022, Kairat announced that Pokatilov had left the club.

On 1 February 2022, Pokatilov re-signed for Aktobe.

On 21 January 2025, Tobol announced the departure of Pokatilov, with Azerbaijan Premier League club Sabah announcing the signing of Pokatilov on the same day. On 26 May 2026, Sabah announced that they had extended their contract with Pokatilov for another season.

== Personal life ==
He has a twin-brother Vladimir Pokatilov, who is also football player.

== Career statistics ==
=== Club ===
As of match played 15 October 2026

Appearances and goals by club, season and competition
Club	Season	League			National cup (Note: Includes Kazakhstan Cup, Azerbaijan Cup)		Continental		Other		Total	
Club	Season	Division	Apps	Goals	Apps	Goals	Apps	Goals	Apps	Goals	Apps	Goals
Akzhayik	2011	Kazakhstan Premier League	0	0	1	0	—		—		1	0
Akzhayik	2012	Kazakhstan Premier League	14	0	0	0	—		—		14	0
Akzhayik	Total		14	0	1	0	—		—		15	0
Shakhter Karagandy	2013	Kazakhstan Premier League	10	0	0	0	2 (Note: Appearance(s) in UEFA Europa League)	0	—		12	0
Shakhter Karagandy	2014	Kazakhstan Premier League	6	0	1	0	0	0	0	0	7	0
Shakhter Karagandy	Total		16	0	1	0	2	0	0	0	19	0
Aktobe	2015	Kazakhstan Premier League	32	0	4	0	1	0	—		37	0
Rostov	2015–16	Russian Premier League	0	0	0	0	—		—		0	0
Kairat (loan)	2016	Kazakhstan Premier League	8	0	3	0	0	0	—		11	0
Kairat	2017	Kazakhstan Premier League	17	0	2	0	2	0	0	0	21	0
Kairat	2018	Kazakhstan Premier League	26	0	3	0	1	0	0	0	30	0
Kairat	2019	Kazakhstan Premier League	30	0	0	0	4	0	1 (Note: Appearance in Kazakhstan Super Cup)	0	35	0
Kairat	2020	Kazakhstan Premier League	13	0	0	0	2	0	—		15	0
Kairat	2021	Kazakhstan Premier League	25	0	7	0	13 (Note: Three appearances in UEFA Champions League, two appearances in UEFA Europa League, eight appearances in UEFA Europa Conference League)	0	1	0	46	0
Kairat	Total		111	0	12	0	22	0	2	0	147	0
Aktobe	2022	Kazakhstan Premier League	21	0	3	0	—		—		24	0
Aktobe	2023	Kazakhstan Premier League	24	0	0	0	4 (Note: Appearances in UEFA Europa Conference League)	0	—		28	0
Aktobe	Total		45	0	3	0	4	0	—		52	0
Tobol	2024	Kazakhstan Premier League	24	0	4	0	4 (Note: Two appearances in UEFA Europa League, two appearances in UEFA Europa Conference League)	0	1	0	33	0
Sabah	2024–25	Azerbaijan Premier League	14	0	5	0	—		—		19	0
Sabah	2025–26	Azerbaijan Premier League	30	0	6	0	6	0	—		42	0
Sabah	2026–27	Azerbaijan Premier League	4	0	0	0	10	0	—		14	0
Sabah	Total		48	0	11	0	16	0	—		75	0
Career total			298	0	39	0	49	0	3	0	389	0

=== International ===
As of match played 16 November 2026

Appearances and goals by national team and year
National team	Year	Apps	Goals
Kazakhstan	2014	0	0
Kazakhstan	2015	7	0
Kazakhstan	2016	6	0
Kazakhstan	2017	2	0
Kazakhstan	2018	0	0
Kazakhstan	2019	0	0
Kazakhstan	2020	6	0
Kazakhstan	2021	5	0
Kazakhstan	2022	0	0
Kazakhstan	2023	0	0
Kazakhstan	2024	2	0
Kazakhstan	2025	1	0
Kazakhstan	2026	4	0
Total		33	0

== Honours ==
FC Shakhter Karagandy

- Kazakhstan Cup: 2013

Kairat

- Kazakhstan Premier League: 2020
- Kazakhstan Cup: 2017, 2018
- Kazakhstan Super Cup: 2017

FC Tobol

- Kazakhstan Super Cup: 2024

Sabah

- Azerbaijan Premier League: 2025–26
- Azerbaijan Cup: 2024–25, 2025–26
