= Umarali Rakhmonaliev =

Uzbekistani footballer

Personal information
- Full name: Umarali Muammadali oʻgʻli Rahmonaliyev
- Date of birth: 18 August 2003 (age 23)
- Place of birth: Toʻraqoʻrgʻon, Namangan Region, Uzbekistan
- Height: 1.70 m (5 ft 7 in)
- Position: Defensive midfielder

Team information
- Current team: Sabah
- Number: 7

Youth career
- Bunyodkor

Senior career*
Years	Team	Apps	(Gls)
2021–2022	Bunyodkor	25	(8)
2023–2025	Rubin Kazan	17	(0)
2025	→ Sabah (loan)	29	(3)
2026–	Sabah	15	(4)

International career^{‡}
2022	Uzbekistan U19	2	(0)
2022–2023	Uzbekistan U20	11	(2)
2023–2024	Uzbekistan U23	16	(2)
2026–	Uzbekistan	1	(0)
Medal record
Men's football
Representing Uzbekistan
AFC U-23 Asian Cup
Silver medal – second place	2024 Qatar	Team
- * Club domestic league appearances and goals as of 22 June 2026 ‡ National team caps and goals as of 30 July 2024

Umarali Muammadali oʻgʻli Rahmonaliyev (Russian: Умарали Рахмоналиев; born 18 August 2003) is an Uzbekistani professional footballer who plays as a defensive midfielder for Azerbaijan Premier League club Sabah and the Uzbekistan national team.

== Club career ==
Rakhmonaliev made his debut in the Russian Premier League for Rubin Kazan on 22 July 2023 in a game against Lokomotiv Moscow.

On 28 January 2025, Rakhmonaliev moved on loan to Sabah in Azerbaijan. On 6 January 2026, Rubin announced that the transfer was made permanent.

== Career statistics ==
=== Club ===
As of match played 26 November 2024

Appearances and goals by club, season and competition
Club	Season	League			National cup (Note: Includes Uzbekistan Cup, Russian Cup)		Continental		Other		Total	
Club	Season	Division	Apps	Goals	Apps	Goals	Apps	Goals	Apps	Goals	Apps	Goals
Bunyodkor	2021	Uzbekistan Super League	4	1	2	0	—		—		6	1
Bunyodkor	2022	Uzbekistan Super League	21	7	4	1	—		—		25	8
Bunyodkor	Total		25	8	6	1	—		—		31	9
Rubin Kazan	2022–23	Russian First League	4	0	0	0	—		—		4	0
Rubin Kazan	2023–24	Russian Premier League	11	0	5	0	—		—		16	0
Rubin Kazan	2024–25	Russian Premier League	2	0	5	0	—		—		7	0
Rubin Kazan	Total		17	0	10	0	—		—		27	0
Career total			42	8	16	1	0	0	0	0	58	9

== Honours ==
Rubin Kazan

- Russian First League: 2022–23

Sabah

- Azerbaijan Premier League: 2025–26
- Azerbaijan Cup: 2024–25, 2025–26

Uzbekistan U20

- AFC U-20 Asian Cup: 2023
