= Christian Nwachukwu =

Nigerian footballer (born 2005)

Personal information
- Full name: Christian Chikwado Nwachukwu
- Date of birth: 27 December 2005 (age 20)
- Place of birth: Abeokuta, Nigeria
- Height: 1.78 m (5 ft 10 in)
- Position: Winger

Team information
- Current team: Sabah
- Number: 8

Youth career
- G12 FC
- 2022–2024: FDC Vista

Senior career*
Years	Team	Apps	(Gls)
2024–2025	Botev Plovdiv	26	(4)
2025–2026	Sheffield United	0	(0)
2026	→ Serikspor (loan)	11	(1)
2026–	Sabah	0	(0)
- * Club domestic league appearances and goals as of 12:47, 27 April 2026 (UTC)

Christian Chikwado Nwachukwu (born 27 December 2005) is a Nigerian professional footballer who plays as a winger for Sabah.

== Career ==
Nwachukwu joined Bulgarian club Botev Plovdiv in February 2024 and was a non-playing substitute in their Bulgarian cup-winning side that season.

=== Sheffield United ===
On 3 February 2025, he moved to English Championship club Sheffield United subject to a work permit being obtained. He joined Serikspor in TFF 1. Lig on loan for the second half of the 2025-26 season.

=== Sabah FK ===
On 8 August 2026, Sabah signed Nwachukwu on a three-year deal for an undisclosed fee from Sheffield United, having been unsuccessful breaking into the Blades' first team.

== Career statistics ==
As of match played 23 November 2024

Appearances and goals by club, season and competition
Club	Season	League			National cup		League cup		Europe		Other		Total	
Club	Season	Division	Apps	Goals	Apps	Goals	Apps	Goals	Apps	Goals	Apps	Goals	Apps	Goals
Botev Plovdiv	2023–24	Bulgarian First League	8	1	0	0	—		—		—		8	1
Botev Plovdiv	2024–25	Bulgarian First League	18	3	0	0	—		6 (Note: Four appearances and one goal in UEFA Europa League, two appearances in UEFA Conference League)	1	—		24	4
Botev Plovdiv	Total		26	4	0	0	—		6	1	—		32	5
Sheffield United	2025–26	EFL Championship	0	0	0	0	0	0	—		—		0	0
Career total			26	4	0	0	0	0	6	1	0	0	32	5
