= Amin Ramazanov =

Azerbaijani footballer (born 2003)

Personal information
- Full name: Amin Raisovich Ramazanov
- Date of birth: 20 January 2003 (age 23)
- Place of birth: Moscow, Russia
- Height: 1.92 m (6 ft 3 1/2 in)
- Position: Goalkeeper

Team information
- Current team: Sabah
- Number: 1

Youth career
- Lokomotiv Moscow

Senior career*
Years	Team	Apps	(Gls)
2021–2026	Qarabağ	15	(0)
2025	→ Zagatala (loan)	11	(0)
2026–	Sabah	0	(0)

International career^{‡}
2019	Azerbaijan U17	2	(0)
2021	Azerbaijan U19	5	(0)
2022–2024	Azerbaijan U21	3	(0)
- * Club domestic league appearances and goals as of 4 July 2026 ‡ National team caps and goals as of 11 June 2024

Amin Raisovich Ramazanov (Azerbaijani: Amin Rais oğlu Ramazanov; Russian: Амин Раисович Рамазанов; born 20 January 2003) is a footballer who plays as a goalkeeper for Sabah in the Azerbaijan Premier League. Born in Russia, he represents Azerbaijan internationally.

== Career ==
=== Club ===
On 28 February 2022, Ramazanov made his debut for Qarabağ in a 0–0 draw against Keşla in the Azerbaijan Premier League.

On 7 July 2026, Ramazanov signed a two-year contract with Sabah.
