= Xander Severina =

Curaçaoan footballer

Personal information
- Full name: Xander David Severina
- Date of birth: 12 April 2001 (age 25)
- Place of birth: Rijswijk, Netherlands
- Height: 1.85 m (6 ft 1 in)
- Position: Winger

Team information
- Current team: Sabah
- Number: 34

Youth career
- Semper Altius
- 2009–2018: Sparta Rotterdam
- 2018–2020: Quick Den Haag
- 2020–2021: ADO Den Haag

Senior career*
Years	Team	Apps	(Gls)
2021–2023	ADO Den Haag	55	(6)
2023–2024	Partizan	35	(8)
2024–2026	Maccabi Haifa	22	(6)
2025–2026	→ Casa Pia (loan)	5	(0)
2026–	Sabah	4	(2)

International career^{‡}
2023–	Curaçao	5	(1)
- * Club domestic league appearances and goals as of 1 November 2026 ‡ National team caps and goals as of 25 October 2024

Xander David Severina (born 12 April 2001) is a professional footballer who plays as a winger for Azerbaijan Premier League club Sabah. Born in the Netherlands, he plays for the Curaçao national team.

== Club career ==
A youth product of Semper Altius, Sparta Rotterdam, and Quick Den Haag, Severina signed with ADO Den Haag on 20 May 2020. Severina made his debut with ADO Den Haag in a 4–1 Eredivisie loss to FC Utrecht on 4 April 2021.

In July 2023, Partizan signed Xander Severina on a free transfer. Severina will be one of Igor Duljaj's solutions and the sixth signing in the summer transfer window. Severina made his debut in the first round of the Serbian SuperLiga in a 3–3 draw against TSC. In the third round of the Serbian SuperLiga, Partizan defeated Radnički Niš with 2–1. The winning goal was scored by Xander Severina in the 86th minute of the game, directly from a free kick. Severina scored the winning goal in a difficult away game in a 1–0 win over Novi Pazar, helping Partizan to its 12th consecutive win.

== International career ==
In March 2023, Severina received his first call-up to the Curaçao senior national team for the Nations League match against Canada and the friendly against Argentina. On 8 June 2024, Severina scored his first international goal, in a 2–0 2026 FIFA World Cup qualifier win over Aruba.

== Personal life ==
Born in Rijswijk in the Netherlands, Severina is of Curaçaoan descent.

== Career statistics ==
=== Club ===
As of match played 1 November 2026

Appearances and goals by club, season and competition
Club	Season	League			National cup (Note: Includes KNVB Cup, Serbian Cup, Israel State Cup)		Europe		Other		Total	
Club	Season	Division	Apps	Goals	Apps	Goals	Apps	Goals	Apps	Goals	Apps	Goals
ADO Den Haag	2020–21	Eredivisie	2	0	0	0	—		—		2	0
ADO Den Haag	2021–22	Eerste Divisie	18	0	2	0	—		2 (Note: Appearances in play-offs)	0	24	0
ADO Den Haag	2022–23	Eerste Divisie	35	6	3	2	—		—		26	1
ADO Den Haag	Total		55	6	5	2	0	0	2	0	62	8
Partizan	2023–24	Serbian SuperLiga	30	8	3	0	4 (Note: Appearances in UEFA Europa Conference League)	0	—		34	8
Partizan	2024–25	Serbian SuperLiga	5	0	0	0	6 (Note: Two appearances in UEFA Champions League, two appearances in UEFA Europa League, two appearances in UEFA Conference League)	0	—		11	0
Partizan	Total		35	8	3	0	10	0	—		45	8
Maccabi Haifa	2024–25	Israeli Premier League	22	6	2	0	—		1	0	25	6
Sabah	2026–27	Azerbaijan Premier League	4	2	0	0	8	1	—		12	3
Career total			116	22	10	2	18	1	3	0	144	25

=== International ===
As of match played 8 June 2024

Appearances and goals by national team and year
National team	Year	Apps	Goals
Curaçao	2023	1	0
Curaçao	2024	4	1
Total		5	1

As of match played 8 June 2024
Curaçao score listed first, score column indicates score after each Severina goal.

List of international goals scored by Xander Severina
No.	Date	Venue	Cap	Opponent	Score	Result	Competition	Ref.
1	8 June 2024	Trinidad Stadium, Oranjestad, Aruba	3	Aruba	2–0	2–0	2026 FIFA World Cup qualification	
