= Sabah FK (Azerbaijan) =

Azerbaijani football club

Sabah
- Full name: Sabah Futbol Klubu
- Nicknames: Bayquşlar (The Owls); Tələbələr (The Students); Qara-çəhrayılar (The Black-pinks)
- Founded: 8 September 2017; 9 years ago
- Ground: Sabah Arena
- Capacity: 6500
- President: Magsud Adigozalov
- Head coach: Valdas Dambrauskas
- League: Azerbaijan Premier League
- 2025–26: 1st of 12 (champions)
- Website: sabahfc.az
| Home colours | Away colours | Third colours |

Sabah Futbol Klubu (pronounced [sɑbɑh], lit. 'Tomorrow Football Club') is a professional football club based in Mardakan, Azerbaijan. The team has played in the Azerbaijan Premier League, the top tier of Azerbaijani football league system, since the 2018–19 season. Its home ground is the Sabah Arena in Mardakan.

== History ==
Sabah were formed on 8 September 2017, joining the Azerbaijan First Division for the 2017–18 season, in which they finished 5th. After the four teams above them in the league failed or declined promotion, Sabah were granted a license to participate in Azerbaijan Premier League on 12 May 2018. Sabah won their first game 1–0 in the Azerbaijan Premier League, against Keşlə FK (currently known as Şamaxı FK), on 12 August 2018, thanks to a Marko Dević goal. Sabah went on to finish their first Premier League season in 7th position, avoiding relegation.

On 16 September 2019, Elshad Ahmadov resigned as manager, with Igor Ponomaryov taking over on an interim basis.

On 26 November 2019, Sabah announced that Željko Sopić had been appointed manager on an 18-month contract. On 3 July 2020, Sopić resigned as manager.

On 10 July 2020, Sabah signed a two-year contract with Vicente Gómez. On 11 March 2021, Gómez left his role as Head Coach by mutual agreement, with Ramin Guliyev being placed in temporary charge. At the end of the season, Guliyev was confirmed as the club's new head coach on a two-year contract Guliyev resigned from his position on 21 October 2021, with Murad Musayev being appointed as the club's new head coach on 30 October 2021, signing a two-year contract.

On 1 February 2024, Sabah announced that Murad Musayev had left his role as head coach after his resignation had been accepted.

On 5 March 2024, Sabah announced the appointment of Krunoslav Rendulić as their new head coach, on an 18-month contract. Rendulić left Sabah on 25 November 2024 by mutual agreement, with Vasili Berezutski being appointed as his replacement on the same day to a two-and-a-half year contract. On 14 June 2025, Berezutski left the club by mutual consent due to personal reasons. On 20 June 2025, Sabah announced the appointment of Lithuanian Valdas Dambrauskas as the new head coach, signing a three-year contract.

On 30 April 2026, Sabah secured the Premier League title for the first time in their history after Qarabağ lost 2–1 against Neftçi. On 13 May 2026, Sabah defeated Zira 2–1 to win the 2025–26 Azerbaijan Cup.

On 25 August 2026, Sabah FK qualified for the UEFA Champions League for the first time in their history after beating Hapoel Be'er Sheva 5-2 (6-4 on agg).

=== Domestic history ===
| Season | League | | | | | | | | | Azerbaijan Cup | Top goalscorer | | Manager |
| Season | Div. | Pos. | Pl. | W | D | L | GS | GA | P | Azerbaijan Cup | Name | League | Manager |
|---|---|---|---|---|---|---|---|---|---|---|---|---|---|
| 2017–18 | 2nd | 5th | 27 | 11 | 7 | 9 | 41 | 33 | 40 | Second round | Raul Yaqubzadə | 8 | (Azerbaijan) Arif Asadov |
| 2018–19 | 1st | 7th | 28 | 7 | 6 | 15 | 20 | 41 | 27 | Quarter-final | (Ukraine) Marko Dević | 8 | (Azerbaijan) Elshad Ahmadov |
| 2019–20 | 1st | 6th | 20 | 5 | 6 | 9 | 19 | 27 | 21 | Quarter-final | (Mali) Ulysse Diallo (Guinea) Amadou Diallo (South Africa) Hendrick Ekstein | 3 | (Azerbaijan) Elshad Ahmadov (Azerbaijan) Igor Ponomaryov (interim) (Croatia) Željko Sopić |
| 2020–21 | 1st | 5th | 28 | 7 | 8 | 13 | 28 | 38 | 29 | Round of 16 | (Azerbaijan) Ramil Sheydayev | 6 | (Spain) Vicente Gómez (Azerbaijan) Ramin Guliyev (interim) |
| 2021–22 | 1st | 5th | 28 | 12 | 5 | 11 | 42 | 34 | 41 | Quarter-final | (Germany) Joy-Lance Mickels (Note: Joy-Lance Mickels was born in Germany, but qualified to represent Rwanda, making his debut in 2026.) | 11 | (Azerbaijan) Ramin Guliyev (Russia) Murad Musayev |
| 2022–23 | 1st | 2nd | 36 | 25 | 6 | 5 | 75 | 24 | 81 | Quarter-final | (Germany) Joy-Lance Mickels | 17 | (Russia) Murad Musayev |
| 2023–24 | 1st | 3rd | 36 | 17 | 7 | 12 | 50 | 40 | 58 | Quarter-final | (Georgia (country)) Davit Volkovi (Azerbaijan) Anatoliy Nuriyev | 6 | (Russia) Murad Musayev (Azerbaijan) Ruslan Qafitullin (interim) (Croatia) Krunoslav Rendulić |
| 2024–25 | 1st | 5th | 36 | 10 | 18 | 8 | 50 | 46 | 48 | Winners | (Nigeria) Jesse Sekidika | 11 | (Croatia) Krunoslav Rendulić (Russia) Vasili Berezutski |
| 2025–26 | 1st | 1st | 33 | 24 | 6 | 3 | 75 | 25 | 78 | Winners | (Rwanda) Joy-Lance Mickels | 19 | (Lithuania) Valdas Dambrauskas |

=== European record ===
As of match played 4 November 2026

| Competition | Pld | W | D | L | GF | GA |
|---|---|---|---|---|---|---|
| UEFA Champions League | 12 | 7 | 0 | 5 | 22 | 17 |
| UEFA Europa League | 2 | 0 | 1 | 1 | 5 | 6 |
| UEFA Conference League | 12 | 6 | 0 | 6 | 18 | 15 |
| Total | 26 | 13 | 1 | 12 | 45 | 38 |

| Season | Competition | Round | Club | Home | Away | Aggregate |
|---|---|---|---|---|---|---|
| 2023–24 | UEFA Europa Conference League | 2Q | (Latvia) RFS | 2–1 | 2–0 | 4–1 |
| 2023–24 | UEFA Europa Conference League | 3Q | (Serbia) Partizan | 2–0 | 0–2 (a.e.t.) | 2–2 (4–5 p) |
| 2024–25 | UEFA Conference League | 2Q | (Israel) Maccabi Haifa | 3–6 (a.e.t.) | 3–0 | 6–6 (3–2 p) |
| 2024–25 | UEFA Conference League | 3Q | (Republic of Ireland) St Patrick's Athletic | 0–1 | 0–1 | 0–2 |
| 2025–26 | UEFA Europa League | 1Q | (Slovenia) Celje | 2–3 | 3–3 (a.e.t.) | 5–6 |
| 2025–26 | UEFA Conference League | 2Q | (Moldova) Petrocub Hîncești | 4–1 | 2–0 | 6–1 |
| 2025–26 | UEFA Conference League | 3Q | (Bulgaria) Levski Sofia | 0–2 | 0–1 | 0–3 |
| 2026–27 | UEFA Champions League | 1Q | (Wales) The New Saints | 2–0 | 2–1 | 4–1 |
| 2026–27 | UEFA Champions League | 2Q | (Finland) KuPS | 1–0 | 2–0 | 3–0 |
| 2026–27 | UEFA Champions League | 3Q | (Denmark) Aarhus | 4–0 | 1–2 | 5–2 |
| 2026–27 | UEFA Champions League | PO | (Israel) Hapoel Be'er Sheva | 5–2 (a.e.t.) | 1–2 | 6–4 |
| 2026–27 | UEFA Champions League | LP | (England) Manchester United | —N/a | 0–4 | |
| 2026–27 | UEFA Champions League | LP | (Czech Republic) Slavia Praha | 2–0 | —N/a | |
| 2026–27 | UEFA Champions League | LP | (Germany) Borussia Dortmund | 1–2 | —N/a | |
| 2026–27 | UEFA Champions League | LP | (Norway) Viking | —N/a | 1–4 | |
| 2026–27 | UEFA Champions League | LP | (Spain) Barcelona | | —N/a | |
| 2026–27 | UEFA Champions League | LP | (Spain) Villarreal | —N/a | | |
| 2026–27 | UEFA Champions League | LP | (Italy) Napoli | | —N/a | |
| 2026–27 | UEFA Champions League | LP | (England) Arsenal | —N/a | | |

== Colours and badge ==
Sabah's badge features rays of sunshine encased in a shield.

The team's main colours are black-pink, with their kit being made by Spanish clothing company Joma during their first season, and Macron from the start of the 2018–19 season.

== Shirt sponsor and kit manufacturer ==
| Years | Manufacturer | Sponsor |
|---|---|---|
| 2017–2018 | Joma | none |
| 2018–2020 | Macron | Bank Respublika |
| 2020– | Nike | Bank Respublika |

== Stadium ==
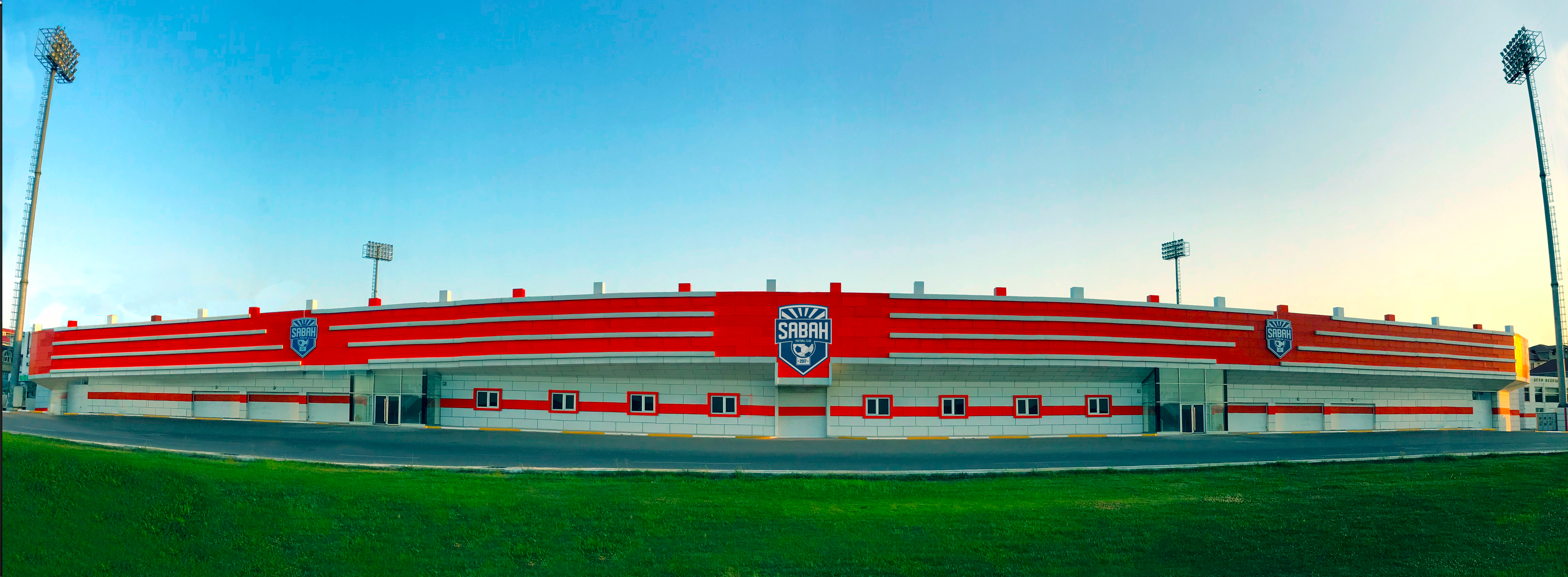
View of Alinja Arena

The club play their home games at the Bank Respublika Arena in Masazır, which has a capacity of 8.969. In Champions League matches, the club play their home games at Tofiq Bahramov Republican Stadium for play-off matches and Baku Olympic Stadium for league phase matches.

== Players ==
=== Current squad ===
As of 1 September 2026

Note: Flags indicate national team as defined under FIFA eligibility rules; some limited exceptions apply. Players may hold more than one non-FIFA nationality.

| No. | Pos. | Nation | Player |
|---|---|---|---|
| 1 | GK | AZE | Amin Ramazanov |
| 3 | DF | GLP | Steve Solvet |
| 4 | DF | RSA | Aden McCarthy |
| 5 | DF | AZE | Rahman Dashdamirov |
| 6 | MF | AZE | Abdulakh Khaybulayev |
| 7 | MF | UZB | Umarali Rakhmonaliev |
| 8 | FW | NGR | Christian Nwachukwu |
| 9 | FW | AZE | Khayal Aliyev |
| 10 | MF | AZE | Aleksey Isayev (vice-captain) |
| 11 | MF | JAM | Kaheem Parris |
| 13 | MF | CRO | Ivan Lepinjica |
| 16 | MF | AZE | Rauf Rustamli |
| 17 | DF | AZE | Tellur Mutallimov |
| 18 | FW | BRA | Carlos Eduardo (on loan from Gil Vicente) |
| 20 | FW | RWA | Joy-Lance Mickels |

| No. | Pos. | Nation | Player |
|---|---|---|---|
| 21 | MF | SRB | Veljko Simić |
| 22 | MF | FRA | Zinédine Ould Khaled |
| 23 | FW | FRA | Younes Lachaab (on loan from Lille) |
| 27 | DF | POL | Tymoteusz Puchacz |
| 33 | DF | BRA | Erivaldo Almeida |
| 34 | FW | CUW | Xander Severina |
| 35 | DF | NGR | Japhet Dungus |
| 37 | MF | BRA | Du Queiroz (on loan from Zenit) |
| 80 | DF | ALG | Akim Zedadka |
| 88 | MF | POR | Rodrigo Fernandes |
| 89 | MF | AZE | Jafar Mukhtarov |
| 92 | GK | KAZ | Stas Pokatilov (captain) |
| 94 | GK | AZE | Ravan Mirzammadov |
| 95 | MF | AZE | Shahin Ibrahimov |
| 99 | FW | GAB | Orphé Mbina |

For recent transfers, see Transfers summer 2026.

=== Out on loan ===
Note: Flags indicate national team as defined under FIFA eligibility rules; some limited exceptions apply. Players may hold more than one non-FIFA nationality.

| No. | Pos. | Nation | Player |
|---|---|---|---|
| — | DF | AZE | Abdulla Rzayev (at Araz-Naxçıvan until 30 June 2027) |
| — | DF | BRA | Andrey Santos (at Veres Rivne until 30 June 2027) |

=== Reserve team ===
Sabah-2 plays in the Azerbaijan Reserve League.

== Club officials ==
=== Management ===
| Position | Staff |
|---|---|
| Founder | (Azerbaijan) Yagub Huseynov |
| President | (Azerbaijan) Magsud Adigozalov |
| Supervisory Board Member | (Azerbaijan) Yagub Huseynov (Azerbaijan) Firudin Gurbanov (Azerbaijan) Igor Ponomaryov (Azerbaijan) Rahman Hajiyev (Azerbaijan) Rauf Khalilov |
| Chief executive officer | (Azerbaijan) Ramin Hasanov |
| General Manager | (Azerbaijan) Nasimi Musayev |
| Director of sport | (Azerbaijan) Igor Ponomaryov |
| Press secretary | (Azerbaijan) Elnur Hamidov |

=== Coaching staff ===
| Position | Name |
|---|---|
| Head coach | (Lithuania) Valdas Dambrauskas |
| Assistant head coach | (Italy) Valerio Zuddas |
| Goalkeeping coach | (Lithuania) Justinas Gasiūnas |
| Fitness coach | (Croatia) Domagoj Peric |
| Video analyst | (Ukraine) Oleksandr Panchuk (Russia) Nikita Vasyukhin |

== Honours ==
- Azerbaijan Premier League
  - Winners (1): 2025–26
  - Runners-up (1): 2022–23
- Azerbaijan Cup
  - Winners (2): 2024–25, 2025–26

== Club records ==
=== Most appearances ===
As of match played 8 November 2026

| | Name | Years | League | Azerbaijan Cup | European | Total |
|---|---|---|---|---|---|---|
| 1 | (Azerbaijan) Amin Seydiyev | 2020–2026 | 161 (4) | 14 (2) | 10 (0) | 185 (6) |
| 2 | (Rwanda) Joy-Lance Mickels | 2021–2023, 2024–Present | 120 (64) | 17 (7) | 24 (13) | 161 (84) |
| 3 | (Azerbaijan) Aleksey Isayev | 2020–2024, 2025–Present | 128 (16) | 12 (0) | 14 (1) | 154 (17) |
| 4 | (Bosnia and Herzegovina) Bojan Letić | 2022–2026 | 104 (5) | 8 (0) | 13 (2) | 125 (7) |
| 5 | (Azerbaijan) Anatoliy Nuriyev | 2022–2026 | 98 (11) | 10 (1) | 10 (0) | 118 (12) |
| 6 | (Jamaica) Kaheem Parris | 2023–2024, 2024–Present | 87 (13) | 12 (2) | 17 (4) | 116 (19) |
| 7 | (Azerbaijan) Elvin Camalov | 2021–2025 | 98 (2) | 9 (0) | 6 (0) | 113 (2) |
| 8 | (Azerbaijan) Tellur Mutallimov | 2022–Present | 91 (4) | 12 (1) | 7 (1) | 110 (6) |
| 9 | (Nigeria) Jesse Sekidika | 2023–2026 | 86 (17) | 11 (3) | 10 (1) | 107 (21) |
| 10 | (Malaysia) Jon Irazabal | 2022–2025 | 85 (5) | 6 (1) | 8 (0) | 99 (6) |

=== Top goalscorers ===
As of match played 8 November 2026

| | Name | Years | League | Azerbaijan Cup | European | Total | Ratio |
|---|---|---|---|---|---|---|---|
| 1 | (Rwanda) Joy-Lance Mickels | 2021–2023, 2024–Present | 64 (120) | 7 (17) | 13 (24) | 84 (161) | 0.52 |
| 2 | (Nigeria) Jesse Sekidika | 2023–2026 | 17 (86) | 3 (11) | 1 (10) | 21 (107) | 0.2 |
| 3 | (Serbia) Veljko Simić | 2025–2026, 2026–Present | 13 (34) | 1 (6) | 6 (12) | 20 (52) | 0.38 |
| 4 | (Georgia (country)) Davit Volkovi | 2022–2024 | 16 (63) | 2 (4) | 1 (4) | 19 (71) | 0.27 |
| 4 | (Jamaica) Kaheem Parris | 2023–2024, 2024–Present | 13 (87) | 2 (12) | 4 (17) | 19 (116) | 0.16 |
| 6 | (Ukraine) Oleksiy Kashchuk | 2022–2023 | 18 (39) | 0 (2) | 0 (0) | 18 (41) | 0.44 |
| 6 | (Slovakia) Pavol Šafranko | 2024–2026 | 10 (39) | 2 (5) | 6 (10) | 18 (54) | 0.33 |
| 8 | (Azerbaijan) Aleksey Isayev | 2020–2024, 2025–Present | 16 (128) | 0 (12) | 1 (14) | 17 (154) | 0.11 |
| 9 | (Nigeria) Emmanuel Apeh | 2022–2024 | 11 (65) | 4 (6) | 1 (4) | 16 (75) | 0.21 |
| 10 | (Azerbaijan) Anatoliy Nuriyev | 2022–2026 | 11 (98) | 1 (10) | 0 (10) | 12 (118) | 0.1 |

=== Managerial statistics ===
As of match played 8 November 2026

| Name | Nat. | From | To | Duration | P | W | D | L | GS | GA | %W | Honours | Notes |
|---|---|---|---|---|---|---|---|---|---|---|---|---|---|
| Arif Asadov | Azerbaijan | 8 September 2017 | 1 July 2018 | 296 days | 28 | 11 | 7 | 10 | 41 | 36 | 39.29 | (Promotion) | |
| Elshad Ahmadov | Azerbaijan | 1 July 2018 | 16 September 2019 | 1 year, 77 days | 35 | 8 | 8 | 19 | 25 | 47 | 22.86 | | |
| Igor Ponomaryov (Interim) | Azerbaijan | 16 September 2019 | 26 November 2019 | 71 days | 8 | 3 | 2 | 3 | 12 | 11 | 37.50 | | |
| Željko Sopić | Croatia | 26 November 2019 | 3 July 2020 | 230 days | 11 | 3 | 2 | 6 | 12 | 18 | 27.27 | | |
| Vicente Gómez | Spain | 10 July 2020 | 11 March 2021 | 244 days | 20 | 4 | 4 | 12 | 20 | 29 | 20.00 | | |
| Ramin Guliyev (Interim) | Azerbaijan | 11 March 2021 | 26 May 2021 | 76 days | 9 | 3 | 4 | 2 | 9 | 11 | 33.33 | | |
| Ramin Guliyev | Azerbaijan | 26 May 2021 | 21 October 2021 | 224 days | 7 | 0 | 1 | 6 | 3 | 12 | 0.00 | | |
| Ilkin Huseynov (Interim) | Azerbaijan | 21 October 2021 | 30 October 2021 | 9 days | 1 | 1 | 0 | 0 | 3 | 0 | 100.00 | | |
| Murad Musayev | Russia | 30 October 2021 | 1 February 2024 | 2 years, 94 days | 87 | 48 | 16 | 23 | 157 | 88 | 55.17 | | |
| Ruslan Qafitullin (Interim) | Azerbaijan | 1 February 2024 | 5 March 2024 | 33 days | 6 | 3 | 2 | 1 | 13 | 11 | 50.00 | | |
| Krunoslav Rendulić | Croatia | 5 March 2024 | 25 November 2024 | 2 years, 254 days | 29 | 13 | 7 | 9 | 18 | 10 | 44.83 | | |
| Vasili Berezutski | Russia | 25 November 2024 | 14 June 2025 | 201 days | 28 | 10 | 13 | 5 | 39 | 32 | 35.71 | Azerbaijan Cup (1) | |
| Valdas Dambrauskas | Lithuania | 1 July 2025 | | 1 year, 136 days | 67 | 42 | 13 | 12 | 141 | 66 | 62.69 | Azerbaijan Premier League (1); Azerbaijan Cup (1) | |

- Notes:

P – Total of played matches W – Won matches D – Drawn matches L – Lost matches GS – Goal scored GA – Goals against
%W – Percentage of matches won

Nationality is indicated by the corresponding FIFA country code(s).

== Transfers ==
The top transfer was agreed in July 2026 when 20 years old French forward Aaron Malouda moved to Basel for a fee €3.00 million.

=== Record transfers ===
| Rank | Player | To | Fee | Year |
|---|---|---|---|---|
| 1. | (France) Aaron Malouda | (Switzerland) Basel | €3.00 million | 2026 |
| 2. | (Azerbaijan) Aleksey Isayev | (Azerbaijan) Qarabağ | €0.45 million | 2024 |
| 3. | (Rwanda) Joy-Lance Mickels | (Saudi Arabia) Al-Faisaly | €0.30 million | 2023 |
