= Erivaldo Almeida =

Portuguese footballer (born 2000)

Personal information
- Full name: Erivaldo Almeida Santos Junior
- Date of birth: 15 January 2000 (age 26)
- Place of birth: Goiânia, Brazil
- Height: 1.89 m (6 ft 2 in)
- Position: Centre-back

Team information
- Current team: Sabah
- Number: 33

Youth career
- 2018–2019: Atlético Goianense
- 2019–2020: Rio Preto

Senior career*
Years	Team	Apps	(Gls)
2020–2023	Novorizontino	0	(0)
2021	→ Catanduva (loan)	12	(1)
2022	→ Votuporanguense (loan)	9	(0)
2022–2023	→ Estrela da Amadora (loan)	9	(0)
2023–2024	Estrela da Amadora	7	(0)
2024–2026	Marítimo	43	(1)
2026–	Sabah	1	(0)
- * Club domestic league appearances and goals as of 17:38, 25 August 2026 (UTC)

Erivaldo Almeida Santos Junior (born 15 January 2000) is a Brazilian professional footballer who plays as a centre-back for Azerbaijan Premier League club Sabah.

== Professional career ==
Almeia is a youth product of Novorizontino, and began his senior career with them in the 2020 Copa Paulista. He made his senior and professional debut with them in a 3–1 Copa Paulista win over Rio Preto on 4 November 2020. He joined Votuporanguense on loan in the first half of 2022.

On 28 July 2022, Almeida moved to the Portuguese club Estrela on loan for the 2022–23 season in the Liga Portugal 2.

On 17 January 2024, Almeida left Estrela and signed a two-and-a-half-year contract with Liga Portugal 2 club Marítimo.
