= Veljko Simić =

Serbian footballer

Personal information
- Date of birth: 17 February 1995 (age 31)
- Place of birth: Lazarevac, FR Yugoslavia
- Height: 1.80 m (5 ft 11 in)
- Position: Winger

Team information
- Current team: Sabah
- Number: 21

Youth career
- –2013: Red Star Belgrade
- 2013–2014: Basel

Senior career*
Years	Team	Apps	(Gls)
2014–2017	Basel	0	(0)
2014–2015	→ Domžale (loan)	17	(0)
2016	→ Schaffhausen (loan)	10	(0)
2016–2017	→ Chiasso (loan)	33	(4)
2017	Winterthur	2	(0)
2018	Zemun	16	(5)
2018–2021	Red Star Belgrade	44	(9)
2021–2023	Vojvodina	86	(20)
2023–2025	Omonia	45	(6)
2025–2026	Sivasspor	15	(1)
2025–2026	→ Sabah (loan)	28	(12)
2026–	Sabah	0	(0)

International career
2011–2012	Serbia U17	6	(3)
2013–2014	Serbia U19	7	(5)
2014	Serbia U20	1	(0)
2015	Serbia U23	1	(0)
2023	Serbia	1	(1)
- * Club domestic league appearances and goals as of 29 November 2025

Veljko Simić (born 17 February 1995) is a Serbian professional footballer who plays as a winger for Azerbaijan Premier League club Sabah.

== Club career ==
=== Early career ===
A product of the Red Star Belgrade, Simić and Filip Janković were considered the two most talented players from Red Star's youth team of players born in 1995. However, he never transitioned into the first team, and instead signed a professional contract with Basel in 2014. Technical problems made him ineligible, and he was consequently loaned to Slovenian outfit Domžale. He made his first team debut against Radomlje, where he started the match only to be substituted off in the 70th minute.

On 7 January 2016, he joined Schaffhausen on loan until the end of the 2015–16 season. For the season 2016-17 he was loaned to Chiasso. On 1 September 2017, Basel announced that the contract with Simić had been dissolved by mutual consent.

Simić joined Serbian side Zemun as a free agent during the 2017–18 winter transfer window. In his last game for Zemun, he scored a last-minute goal in a 1–1 tie against Vojvodina on 28 July 2018.

=== Red Star Belgrade ===
Simić signed a four-year contract with Red Star Belgrade in the summer of 2018. In a promotional event, he told journalists that his early departure from Red Star to Basel had been "a mistake from which young players can learn". His contract was terminated after two and a half seasons on 11 January 2021.

=== Vojvodina ===
Simic signed a two-and-a-half-year contract with Vojvodina on 13 January 2021.

=== Omonia ===
Simic signed a two plus one-year contract with Omonia on 17 July 2023.

=== Sabah ===
On 28 August 2025, Azerbaijan Premier League club Sabah announced the year-long loan signing of Simić from Sivasspor.

On 2 June 2026, Sabah announced that they had signed Simić to a two-year contract from Sivasspor on a free transfer.

== International career ==
Simić debuted for Serbia on 25 January 2023 in a friendly match against United States which Serbia won 2–1. Simić scored the second Serbian goal of the match and his first goal on international level.

== Career statistics ==
=== Club ===
As of match played 9 March 2024

Appearances and goals by club, season and competition
Club	Season	League			National cup (Note: Includes Slovenian Cup, Swiss Cup, Serbian Cup, Cypriot Cup)		Continental		Other		Total	
Club	Season	Division	Apps	Goals	Apps	Goals	Apps	Goals	Apps	Goals	Apps	Goals
Domžale (loan)	2014–15	Slovenian PrvaLiga	17	0	3	0	—		—		20	0
Schaffhausen (loan)	2015–16	Swiss Challenge League	10	0	—		—		—		10	0
Chiasso (loan)	2016–17	Swiss Challenge League	33	4	2	0	—		—		35	4
Winterthur	2017–18	Swiss Challenge League	2	0	0	0	—		—		2	0
Zemun	2017–18	Serbian SuperLiga	14	3	—		—		—		14	3
Zemun	2018–19	Serbian SuperLiga	2	2	0	0	—		—		2	2
Zemun	Total		16	5	0	0	—		—		16	5
Red Star	2018–19	Serbian SuperLiga	26	6	4	2	9 (Note: Appearances in UEFA Champions League)	0	—		39	8
Red Star	2019–20	Serbian SuperLiga	17	3	2	4	1	0	—		20	7
Red Star	2020–21	Serbian SuperLiga	1	0	1	0	1 (Note: Appearance in UEFA Europa League)	0	—		3	0
Red Star	Total		44	9	7	6	11	0	—		62	15
Vojvodina	2020–21	Serbian SuperLiga	18	3	2	0	—		—		20	3
Vojvodina	2021–22	Serbian SuperLiga	34	10	4	2	4 (Note: Appearances in UEFA Europa Conference League)	0	—		42	12
Vojvodina	2022–23	Serbian SuperLiga	34	7	3	1	—		—		37	8
Vojvodina	Total		86	20	9	3	4	0	—		99	23
Omonia	2023–24	Cypriot First Division	20	2	1	0	4	0	1 (Note: Appearance in Cypriot Super Cup)	0	26	2
Career total			228	40	22	9	19	1	0	0	270	49

=== International ===
As of match played 25 January 2023

Appearances and goals by national team and year
National team	Year	Apps	Goals
Serbia	2023	1	1
Total		1	1

Scores and results list the Serbia's goal tally first, score column indicates score after each Simić's goal.

List of international goals scored by Veljko Simić
No.	Date	Venue	Cap	Opponent	Score	Result	Competition
1	25 January 2023	BMO Stadium, Los Angeles, United States	1	United States	2–1	2–1	Friendly

== Honours ==
Red Star Belgrade

- Serbian SuperLiga: 2018–19, 2019–20

Sabah

- Azerbaijan Premier League: 2025–26
- Azerbaijan Cup: 2025–26

Individual

- Serbian SuperLiga Player of the Month: July 2022
