= Rodrigo Fernandes =

Portuguese footballer

Personal information
- Full name: Rodrigo Francisco Pinto Vieira Fernandes
- Date of birth: March 23, 2001 (age 25)
- Place of birth: Lisbon, Portugal
- Height: 1.84 m (6 ft 0 in)
- Position: Midfielder

Team information
- Current team: Sabah
- Number: 88

Youth career
- 2009–2015: Sporting CP
- 2015–2016: Real Massamá
- 2016–2020: Sporting CP

Senior career*
Years	Team	Apps	(Gls)
2019–2021	Sporting CP	2	(0)
2020–2021	Sporting CP B	25	(0)
2021–2025	Porto B	86	(1)
2026	Şamaxı	5	(0)
2026–	Sabah	0	(0)

International career
2017	Portugal U16	10	(0)
2017–2018	Portugal U17	15	(1)
2018–2019	Portugal U18	8	(0)
2018–2019	Portugal U19	23	(1)
- * Club domestic league appearances and goals as of 23 June 2026

Rodrigo Francisco Pinto Vieira Fernandes (born 23 March 2001) is a Portuguese professional footballer who plays as a midfielder for Azerbaijan Premier League club Sabah.

== Club career ==
Fernandes was born in Lisbon and formed exclusively at his hometown's Sporting CP.

He made his professional debut for Sporting on 27 October 2019 in a 3–1 Primeira Liga home win over Vitória de Guimarães, playing the final two minutes as a substitute for Eduardo Henrique. On 7 November of the same year, Fernandes made his debut in UEFA competitions, coming off the bench to replace Idrissa Doumbia in the final minutes of a 2–0 away victory over Rosenborg in the Europa League.

On 1 September 2021, Fernandes signed for Sporting CP's rivals FC Porto, in a direct swap with 17-year old Marco Cruz. He was assigned to Porto's B team, competing in the Liga Portugal 2.

== Career statistics ==
As of match played 16 September 2023

Appearances and goals by club, season and competition
Club	Season	League			National cup		League cup		Continental		Total	
Club	Season	Division	Apps	Goals	Apps	Goals	Apps	Goals	Apps	Goals	Apps	Goals
Sporting CP	2019–20	Primeira Liga	2	0	0	0	0	0	2 (Note: Appearance(s) in UEFA Europa League)	0	4	0
Sporting CP	2020–21	Primeira Liga	0	0	0	0	0	0	0	0	0	0
Sporting CP	2021–22	Primeira Liga	0	0	0	0	0	0	0	0	0	0
Sporting CP	Total		2	0	0	0	0	0	2	0	4	0
Sporting CP B	2020–21	Campeonato de Portugal	24	0	—		—		—		24	0
Sporting CP B	2021–22	Liga 3	1	0	—		—		—		1	0
Sporting CP B	Total		25	0	—		—		—		25	0
Porto B	2021–22	Liga Portugal 2	17	0	—		—		—		17	0
Porto B	2022–23	Liga Portugal 2	19	1	—		—		—		19	1
Porto B	2023–24	Liga Portugal 2	5	0	—		—		—		5	0
Porto B	Total		41	1	—		—		—		41	1
Career total			68	1	0	0	0	0	2	0	70	1
