= Du Queiroz =

Brazilian footballer (born 2000)

- Queiroz with Zenit Saint Petersburg in 2025

Personal information
- Full name: Eduardo Santos Queiroz
- Date of birth: 7 January 2000 (age 26)
- Place of birth: São Paulo, Brazil
- Height: 1.71 m (5 ft 7 in)
- Position: Midfielder

Team information
- Current team: Sabah (on loan from Zenit St. Petersburg)
- Number: 37

Youth career
- 2009–2013: São Paulo
- 2013–2021: Corinthians

Senior career*
Years	Team	Apps	(Gls)
2021–2023	Corinthians	55	(2)
2023–	Zenit Saint Petersburg	10	(0)
2024	→ Grêmio (loan)	22	(0)
2025	→ Sport Recife (loan)	11	(0)
2025–2026	→ Orenburg (loan)	24	(2)
2026–	→ Sabah (loan)	8	(0)
- * Club domestic league appearances and goals as of 25 October 2026

Eduardo Santos Queiroz (born 7 January 2000), known as Du Queiroz, is a Brazilian footballer who plays as a midfielder for Azeri club Sabah on loan from Russian club Zenit Saint Petersburg.

== Club career ==
=== Corinthians ===
Born in São Paulo, Du Queiroz joined Corinthians' youth setup in 2013, aged 13. He made his first team – and Série A – debut on 22 August 2021, coming on as a first-half substitute for injured Fagner in a 1–0 away win over Athletico Paranaense.

On 14 October 2021, Du Queiroz renewed his contract until December 2024. He scored his first professional goal the following 17 May, netting the opener in a 1–1 Copa Libertadores draw against Boca Juniors at the La Bombonera.

Du Queiroz bid farewell from the club on 16 June 2023, after scoring three goals in 99 matches.

=== Zenit Saint Petersburg ===
In January 2023, Du Queiroz agreed to join Russian Premier League club Zenit Saint Petersburg on a five-year deal from the summer of 2023, with Yuri Alberto moving in the opposite direction.

On 12 February 2024, Du Queiroz reached agreement to join Grêmio on loan until the end of 2024 with an option to buy for 6 million euros. On 3 December 2024, Grêmio announced that the loan is terminated early.

On 26 February 2025, Du Queiroz moved on a new loan to Sport Recife for the 2025 season, with an option to buy.

On 19 August 2025, Du Queiroz was loaned by Orenburg on the Russian Premier League for the 2025–26 season.

On 1 September 2026, Azerbaijan Premier League club Sabah announced the season-long loan signing of Du Queiroz from Zenit St.Petersburg, with the option to make the move permanent.

== Personal life ==
Du Queiroz is the cousin of Nycollas Queiroz, also a footballer.

== Career statistics ==
As of match played 17 May 2026

Appearances and goals by club, season and competition
Club	Season	League			State League		Cup		Continental		Other		Total	
Club	Season	Division	Apps	Goals	Apps	Goals	Apps	Goals	Apps	Goals	Apps	Goals	Apps	Goals
Corinthians	2020	Série A	0	0	5	0	0	0	0	0	—		5	0
Corinthians	2021	Série A	16	0	0	0	0	0	0	0	—		16	0
Corinthians	2022	Série A	36	2	12	0	9	0	9 (Note: Appearances in Copa Libertadores)	1	—		66	3
Corinthians	2023	Série A	3	0	10	0	1	0	3	0	—		17	0
Corinthians	Total		55	2	27	0	10	0	12	1	0	0	104	3
Zenit St. Petersburg	2023–24	Russian Premier League	10	0	—		5	1	—		1 (Note: Appearance in Russian Super Cup)	0	16	1
Grêmio (loan)	2024	Série A	14	0	8	0	1	0	5	0	—		28	0
Sport Recife (loan)	2025	Série A	11	0	—		—		—		2 (Note: Appearances in Copa do Nordeste)	0	13	0
Orenburg (loan)	2025–26	Russian Premier League	24	2	—		5	0	—		—		29	2
Career total			114	4	35	0	21	1	17	1	3	0	190	6

== Honours ==
Zenit Saint Petersburg

- Russian Super Cup: 2023

Grêmio

- Campeonato Gaúcho: 2024

Individual

- Bola de Prata Best Newcomer: 2022
