= Younes Lachaab =

French footballer (born 2005)

Personal information
- Date of birth: 6 January 2005 (age 21)
- Place of birth: Maubeuge, France
- Height: 1.76 m (5 ft 9 in)
- Position: Winger

Team information
- Current team: Sabah (on loan from Lille)
- Number: 23

Youth career
- US Maubeuge
- Lille

Senior career*
Years	Team	Apps	(Gls)
2022–	Lille II	68	(26)
2025–	Lille	2	(0)
2026–	→ Sabah (loan)	0	(0)
- * Club domestic league appearances and goals as of 22 June 2026

Younes Lachaab (born 6 January 2005) is a French professional footballer who plays as a winger for Azerbaijani club Sabah on loan from Lille.

== Club career ==
Born in Maubeuge, Lachaab is a youth product of US Maubeuge and Lille, where he became a standout with the National 3 reserve and youth teams.

In the 2024–25 season, he played as a protagonist in Lille's Youth League campaign, most notably delivering two assists in a 2-1 win over Real Madrid.

Lachaab made his professional debut with Lille in a 6–1 Champions League win over Feyenoord on 30 January 2025.

On 11 June 2026, Lachaab was loaned to Sabah in Azerbaijan.

== Personal life ==
Born in France, Lachaab is of Algerian descent.

== Career statistics ==
As of match played 16 February 2025

Appearances and goals by club, season, and competition
Club	Season	League			Coupe de France		Continental		Total	
Club	Season	Division	Apps	Goals	Apps	Goals	Apps	Goals	Apps	Goals
Lille B	2021–22	National 3	3	1	—		—		3	1
Lille B	2022–23	National 3	9	2	—		—		9	2
Lille B	2023–24	National 3	22	8	—		—		22	8
Lille B	2024–25	National 3	12	8	—		—		12	8
Lille B	Total		46	19	—		—		46	19
Lille	2024–25	Ligue 1	2	0	0	0	1 (Note: Appearance in UEFA Champions League)	0	3	0
Career total			48	19	0	0	1	0	49	19
