= Orphé Mbina =

Gabonese footballer (born 2000)

Personal information
- Full name: Patrick Orphé Mbina
- Date of birth: 2 November 2000 (age 26)
- Place of birth: Libreville, Gabon
- Height: 1.78 m (5 ft 10 in)
- Position: Forward

Team information
- Current team: Sabah
- Number: 99

Senior career*
| Years | Team | Apps | (Gls) |
| –2018 | Stade Mandji | | |
| 2018–2019 | US Colomiers II | | |
| 2019–2020 | Béziers II | 9 | (5) |
| 2020 | Béziers | 2 | (0) |
| 2020–2021 | Grenoble | 1 | (0) |
| 2021–2022 | Beauvais | 18 | (1) |
| 2022–2023 | Chamalières | 29 | (17) |
| 2023–2024 | Nîmes | 30 | (8) |
| 2024–2026 | Maribor | 25 | (9) |
| 2025 | → União de Leiria (loan) | 13 | (1) |
| 2026 | → Sabah (loan) | 8 | (1) |
| 2026– | Sabah | 4 | (2) |

International career^{‡}
| 2023– | Gabon | 6 | (0) |
- * Club domestic league appearances and goals as of 29 September 2026 ‡ National team caps and goals as of 29 September 2026

Patrick Orphé Mbina (born 2 November 2000) is a Gabonese professional footballer who plays as a forward for Azerbaijan Premier League club Sabah and the Gabon national team.

== Club career ==
On 21 August 2020, Mbina signed a contract with Grenoble Foot 38. He made his senior debut with Grenoble in a 1–0 Ligue 2 loss to Amiens SC on 17 October 2020.

On 22 July 2021, he moved to Beauvais. He stayed there for one season, before signing with Chamalières on 28 June 2022.

In July 2023, Mbina signed his first professional contract with Nîmes, for three years, having scored 17 goals for Chamalières during the 2022–23 Championnat National 2 season.

On 26 July 2024, Mbina joined Slovenian PrvaLiga club Maribor on a three-year contract until 2027 for an alleged transfer fee of €300,000.

== International career ==
Mbina was called up to the Gabon national team for a set of 2023 Africa Cup of Nations qualification matches in September 2023.

== Honours ==
Sabah

- Azerbaijan Premier League: 2025–26
- Azerbaijan Cup: 2025–26
