= Aden McCarthy =

South African footballer

- Aden McCarthy in October 2026, as a player of Sabah

Personal information
- Full name: Aden McCarthy
- Date of birth: 4 December 2003 (age 22)
- Place of birth: South Africa
- Height: 1.86 m (6 ft 1 in)
- Position: Centre-back

Team information
- Current team: Sabah
- Number: 4

Youth career
- Kaizer Chiefs

Senior career*
Years	Team	Apps	(Gls)
2024–2026	Kaizer Chiefs	24	(1)
2026–	Sabah	0	(0)

International career^{‡}
2022	South Africa U23	2	(0)
2025–	South Africa	1	(0)
- * Club domestic league appearances and goals as of 22 June 2026 ‡ National team caps and goals as of 22 June 2026

Aden McCarthy (born 4 December 2003) is a South African professional soccer player currently playing as a centre-back for Azerbaijan Premier League club Sabah FK and the South Africa national team.

== Early life ==
McCarthy was born on 4 December 2003. Born in South Africa, he is the son of South Africa international Fabian McCarthy.

== Career ==
McCarthy started his career with South African side Kaizer Chiefs, where he made twenty-four league appearances and scored one goal. South African news website FARPost wrote in that he was "one of Amakhosi's standout performers" while playing for the club.

On 9 June 2026, McCarthy signed a three-year contract with Azerbaijani club Sabah FK.
