= 2019–20 Qarabağ FK season =

Qarabağ
2019–20 season
- President: Tahir Gözal
- Manager: Gurban Gurbanov
- Stadium: Azersun Arena
- Premier League: 1st
- Azerbaijan Cup: Semi-finals
- Champions League: Third qualifying round (vs APOEL)
- Europa League: Group stage
- Top goalscorer: League: Mahir Emreli (7); All: Mahir Emreli (10)
| Home colours | Away colours | Third colours |

The Qarabağ 2019–20 season was Qarabağ's 27th Azerbaijan Premier League season, of which they were defending champions, and was their twelfth season under manager Gurban Gurbanov. Qarabağ were crowned Champions for the 7th season in a row when the season was curtailed on 19 June, whilst they had reached the semi-finals of the Azerbaijan Cup when it was ended. In Europe, Qarabağ were knocked out of the Champions League by APOEL in the Third qualifying round, dropping into the Europa League where they finished 3rd in a group with Sevilla, APOEL and Dudelange.

== Season overview ==
On 7 June, Míchel signed a new two-year contract with Qarabağ.

On 24 June, Qarabağ announced the signing of Jaime Romero on a three-year contract after his Córdoba contract had been mutually ended the previous week.

On 4 July, Qarabağ announced the loan-signing of Ailton from VfB Stuttgart.

On 15 July, Qarabağ announced the signing of Faycal Rherras from AS Béziers on a two-year contract.

On 16 July, Qarabağ announced that Wilde-Donald Guerrier had left the club after failing to return to Azerbaijan after the summer break, and that Magaye Gueye had joined the club from Osmanlıspor.

On 30 August, Qarabağ announced that Dzon Delarge had left the club by mutual consent.

On 2 September, Qarabağ announced the loan signing of Asmir Begović from Bournemouth.

On 23 January, Qarabağ announced the signing of Owusu Kwabena on a 3.5-year contract from Leganés.

On 3 January, Dani Quintana left the club to sign for China League One club Chengdu Better City.

On 13 March 2020, the Azerbaijan Premier League was postponed due to the COVID-19 pandemic.

On 8 June 2020, Qarabağ announced that Magaye Gueye had left the club by mutual consent.

On 19 June 2020, the AFFA announced that the 2019–20 season had been officially ended without the resumption of the remains matches due to the escalating situation of the COVID-19 pandemic in Azerbaijan.

== Squad ==
As of match played 8 March 2020

| No. | Name | Nationality | Position | Date of birth (age) | Signed from | Signed in | Contract ends | Apps. | Goals |
Goalkeepers
| 12 | Shahrudin Mahammadaliyev | (Azerbaijan) | GK | 12 June 1994 (aged 26) | Sumgayit | 2015 | 2020 | 42 | 0 |
| 13 | Vagner | (Brazil) | GK | 6 June 1986 (aged 34) | Royal Excel Mouscron | 2018 | 2020 | 34 | 0 |
Defenders
| 3 | Ailton | (Brazil) | DF | 16 March 1995 (aged 25) | loan from VfB Stuttgart | 2019 | 2020 | 28 | 3 |
| 4 | Rahil Mammadov | (Azerbaijan) | DF | 24 November 1995 (aged 24) | Sabail | 2018 | 2021 | 36 | 1 |
| 5 | Maksim Medvedev | (Azerbaijan) | DF | 29 September 1989 (aged 30) | Youth team | 2006 | 2020 | 432+ | 13+ |
| 14 | Rashad Sadygov | (Azerbaijan) | DF | 16 June 1982 (aged 38) | Eskişehirspor | 2011 | | 323 | 10 |
| 23 | Faycal Rherras | (Morocco) | DF | 7 April 1993 (aged 27) | AS Béziers | 2019 | 2021 | 8 | 1 |
| 30 | Abbas Huseynov | (Azerbaijan) | DF | 13 June 1995 (aged 25) | Inter Baku | 2017 | | 52 | 1 |
| 55 | Badavi Huseynov | (Azerbaijan) | DF | 11 July 1991 (aged 28) | Anzhi Makhachkala | 2012 | 2020 | 326 | 4 |
Midfielders
| 2 | Gara Garayev | (Azerbaijan) | MF | 12 October 1992 (aged 27) | Youth team | 2008 | 2021 | 348 | 3 |
| 7 | Araz Abdullayev | (Azerbaijan) | MF | 18 April 1992 (aged 28) | loan from Panionios | 2018 | 2020 | 50 | 4 |
| 8 | Míchel | (Spain) | MF | 8 November 1985 (aged 34) | Maccabi Haifa | 2015 | 2021 | 168 | 30 |
| 17 | Abdellah Zoubir | (France) | MF | 5 December 1991 (aged 28) | RC Lens | 2018 | 2020 | 76 | 15 |
| 18 | Ismayil Ibrahimli | (Azerbaijan) | MF | 13 February 1998 (aged 22) | MOIK Baku | 2018 | | 23 | 5 |
| 19 | Filip Ozobić | (Croatia) | MF | 8 April 1991 (aged 29) | Gabala | 2018 | 2021 | 51 | 12 |
| 21 | Hajiagha Hajili | (Azerbaijan) | MF | 30 January 1998 (aged 22) | Gabala | 2019 | 2023 | 11 | 0 |
| 71 | Toral Bayramov | (Azerbaijan) | MF | 23 February 2001 (aged 19) | Academy | 2019 | | 2 | 0 |
Forwards
| 9 | Jaime Romero | (Spain) | FW | 31 July 1990 (aged 29) | Córdoba | 2019 | 2022 | 26 | 6 |
| 11 | Mahir Emreli | (Azerbaijan) | FW | 1 July 1997 (aged 22) | Baku | 2015 | 2020 | 164 | 48 |
| 27 | Owusu Kwabena | (Ghana) | FW | 18 June 1997 (aged 23) | Leganés | 2020 | 2023 | 5 | 0 |
| 29 | Musa Qurbanlı | (Azerbaijan) | FW | 13 April 2002 (aged 18) | Youth team | 2019 | | 1 | 0 |
Away on loan
| 44 | Elvin Cafarguliyev | (Azerbaijan) | MF | 26 October 2000 (aged 19) | Youth team | 2019 | | 0 | 0 |
| 70 | Nijat Suleymanov | (Azerbaijan) | MF | 15 November 1998 (aged 21) | Youth team | 2018 | | 1 | 0 |
| 94 | Nijat Mehbaliyev | (Azerbaijan) | GK | 11 September 2000 (aged 19) | Youth team | 2017 | 2019 | 0 | 0 |
Left during the season
| 1 | Asmir Begović | (Bosnia and Herzegovina) | GK | 20 June 1987 (aged 32) | loan from Bournemouth | 2019 | 2020 | 16 | 0 |
| 6 | Simeon Slavchev | (Bulgaria) | MF | 25 September 1993 (aged 26) | Sporting CP | 2018 | 2021 | 39 | 2 |
| 10 | Dani Quintana | (Spain) | MF | 8 March 1987 (aged 33) | Al-Ahli | 2015 | 2020 | 152 | 44 |
| 20 | Richard | (Azerbaijan) | MF | 20 March 1989 (aged 31) | loan from Astana | 2019 | | 283 | 56 |
| 28 | Dzon Delarge | (Republic of the Congo) | FW | 24 June 1990 (aged 29) | Bursaspor | 2018 | 2020 | 19 | 3 |
| 77 | Wilde-Donald Guerrier | (Haiti) | MF | 31 March 1989 (aged 31) | Alanyaspor | 2017 | 2020 | 67 | 6 |
| 99 | Magaye Gueye | (Senegal) | FW | 6 July 1990 (aged 29) | Osmanlıspor | 2019 | | 28 | 8 |

=== Out on loan ===
Note: Flags indicate national team as defined under FIFA eligibility rules; some limited exceptions apply. Players may hold more than one non-FIFA nationality.

| No. | Pos. | Nation | Player |
|---|---|---|---|
| 44 | MF | AZE | Elvin Cafarguliyev (at Sumgayit) |
| 70 | MF | AZE | Nijat Suleymanov (at Zira) |

| No. | Pos. | Nation | Player |
|---|---|---|---|
| 94 | GK | AZE | Nijat Mehbaliyev (at Sumgayit) |

== Transfers ==
=== In ===
| Date | Position | Nationality | Name | From | Fee | Ref. |
|---|---|---|---|---|---|---|
| 24 June 2019 | FW | (Spain) | Jaime Romero | Córdoba | Free | |
| 15 July 2019 | DF | (Morocco) | Faycal Rherras | AS Béziers | Undisclosed | |
| 17 July 2019 | FW | (Senegal) | Magaye Gueye | Osmanlıspor | Undisclosed | |
| 23 January 2020 | FW | (Ghana) | Owusu Kwabena | Leganés | Undisclosed | |

=== Out ===
| Date | Position | Nationality | Name | To | Fee | Ref. |
|---|---|---|---|---|---|---|
| 3 January 2020 | MF | (Spain) | Dani Quintana | Chengdu Better City | Undisclosed | |

=== Loans in ===
| Date from | Position | Nationality | Name | From | Date to | Ref. |
|---|---|---|---|---|---|---|
| 31 August 2018 | MF | (Azerbaijan) | Araz Abdullayev | Panionios | 30 June 2020 | |
| 12 January 2019 | MF | (Azerbaijan) | Richard Almeida | Astana | 31 December 2019 | |
| 4 July 2019 | DF | (Brazil) | Ailton | VfB Stuttgart | End of Season | |
| 2 September 2019 | GK | (Bosnia and Herzegovina) | Asmir Begović | Bournemouth | January 2020 | |

=== Loans out ===
| Date from | Position | Nationality | Name | To | Date to | Ref. |
|---|---|---|---|---|---|---|
| Summer 2019 | MF | (Azerbaijan) | Elvin Jafarguliyev | Sumgayit | End of Season | |
| 13 June 2019 | MF | (Azerbaijan) | Nijat Suleymanov | Zira | End of Season | |
| 13 September 2019 | GK | (Azerbaijan) | Nijat Mehbaliyev | Sumgayit | End of Season | |

=== Released ===
| Date | Position | Nationality | Name | Joined | Date |
|---|---|---|---|---|---|
| 16 July 2019 | MF | (Haiti) | Wilde-Donald Guerrier | Neftçi | 5 September 2019 |
| 30 August 2019 | FW | (Republic of the Congo) | Dzon Delarge | České Budějovice | |
| December 2019 | MF | (Bulgaria) | Simeon Slavchev | Levski Sofia | 22 December 2019 |
| 8 June 2020 | FW | (Senegal) | Magaye Gueye | | |
| 22 June 2020 | GK | (Brazil) | Vagner | | |
| 22 June 2020 | DF | (Morocco) | Faycal Rherras | | |
| 30 June 2020 | GK | (Azerbaijan) | Nijat Mehbaliyev | Sabah | 1 July 2020 |
| 30 June 2020 | DF | (Azerbaijan) | Rashad Sadygov | Retired | |
| 30 June 2020 | MF | (Azerbaijan) | Nijat Suleymanov | | |

== Friendlies ==
| 15 June 2019 | Qarabağ | 3 – 1 | Sabail | Baku |
| 18:00 AZT (UTC+4) | Quintana 12'; Ozobić; T.Bayramov 55' | Report | F.Muradbayli 22' | Stadium: Azersun Arena |
Note: Match consisted of two 30-minute halves.

| 22 June 2019 | Qarabağ (Azerbaijan) | 0 – 2 | (Bulgaria) Ludogorets Razgrad | Austria |
| AZT (UTC+4) | | Report | Marcelinho 17'; Bakalov 71' |

| 25 June 2019 | Qarabağ (Azerbaijan) | 0 – 0 | (Romania) Universitatea Craiova | Austria |
| AZT (UTC+4) | | Report |

| 28 June 2019 | Qarabağ (Azerbaijan) | 2 – 1 | (Russia) Ufa | Austria |
| AZT (UTC+4) | Zoubir 54'; Míchel 62' | Report | Yemelyanov 75' (pen.) |

| 2 July 2019 | Qarabağ (Azerbaijan) | 2 – 2 | (Czech Republic) Viktoria Plzeň | Austria |
| AZT (UTC+4) | Emreli 42', 52' | Report | Goal |

| 18 January 2020 | Qarabağ (Azerbaijan) | 2 – 2 | (Romania) Academica Clinceni | Belek, Turkey |
| 18:00 AZT (UTC+4) | Zoubir 10'; J.Bayramov 89' | Report | 22'; 85' |

| 22 January 2020 | Qarabağ (Azerbaijan) | 1 – 0 | (Kazakhstan) Zhetysu | Belek, Turkey |
| AZT (UTC+4) | Emreli 5' | Report |

| 25 January 2020 | Qarabağ (Azerbaijan) | 2 – 3 | (Poland) Wisła Płock | Belek, Turkey |
| AZT (UTC+4) | Emreli 18' (pen.); Romero 56' | Report | 45'; 61'; 86' |

| 9 June 2020 | Sabah | 0 – 5 | Qarabağ | Masazır |
| AZT (UTC+4) | | Report | Emreli 3', 65'; Romero 15'; Ozobić 37'; Kwabena 90' | Stadium: Bank Respublika Arena |
Note: Match played behind closed doors.

== Competitions ==
=== Azerbaijan Premier League ===
==== Results summary ====
| Overall | | | | | | | | Home | | | | | | Away | | | | | |
| Pld | W | D | L | GF | GA | GD | Pts | W | D | L | GF | GA | GD | W | D | L | GF | GA | GD |
|---|---|---|---|---|---|---|---|---|---|---|---|---|---|---|---|---|---|---|---|
| 20 | 13 | 6 | 1 | 34 | 7 | +27 | 45 | 6 | 4 | 0 | 14 | 3 | +11 | 7 | 2 | 1 | 20 | 4 | +16 |

Last updated: 8 March 2020.
Source: See Results

==== Results by round ====
| Round | 1 | 2 | 3 | 4 | 5 | 6 | 7 | 8 | 9 | 10 | 11 | 12 | 13 | 14 | 15 | 16 | 17 | 18 | 19 | 20 |
|---|---|---|---|---|---|---|---|---|---|---|---|---|---|---|---|---|---|---|---|---|
| Ground | A | H | A | H | A | H | H | A | H | A | H | A | H | H | A | H | A | H | H | A |
| Result | W | W | W | W | W | W | W | D | W | D | D | L | W | D | W | D | W | W | D | W |
| Position | 2 | 1 | 1 | 1 | 1 | 1 | 1 | 1 | 1 | 1 | 1 | 1 | 1 | 1 | 1 | 1 | 1 | 1 | 1 | 1 |

Updated to match(es) played on 8 March 2020. Source: See Results
A = Away; H = Home; W = Win; D = Draw; L = Loss

==== Results ====
| 16 August 2019 1 | Keşla | 0 – 1 | Qarabağ | Baku |
| 19:00 AZT (UTC+4) | Gurbanov (yellow card) 53'; E.Mehdiyev (yellow card) 71' (yellow-red card) 74'; Qirtimov (yellow card) 90+2' | Report | Mammadov (yellow card) 44'; I.Ibrahimli 79' | Stadium: Dalga Arena; Attendance: 800; Referee: Orkhan Mammadov |

| 25 August 2019 2 | Qarabağ | 3 – 0 | Gabala | Baku |
| 21:00 AZT (UTC+4) | Richard (yellow card) 18' (goal) 62' (pen.); Abdullayev (yellow card) 55'; Gueye 63'; Zoubir 80' | Report | U.Isgandarov (yellow card) 45+2' | Stadium: Azersun Arena; Attendance: 1,300; Referee: İnqilab Məmmədov |

| 1 September 2019 3 | Sabail | 0 – 4 | Qarabağ | Baku |
| 21:00 AZT (UTC+4) | Ramazanov (yellow card) 20'; Amirguliyev (yellow card) 58'; Rahimov (yellow card) 70' | Report | Quintana 2'; I.Ibrahimli 29', 59'; Rherras (yellow card) 44'; Emreli 62' (yellow card) 67'; Medvedev (yellow card) 86' | Stadium: Bayil Arena; Attendance: 2,000; Referee: Kamal Umudlu |

| 15 September 2019 4 | Qarabağ | 2 – 0 | Neftçi | Baku |
| 20:30 AZT (UTC+4) | Emreli 31'; Zoubir 70'; Ailton (yellow card) 90+3' | Report | Mahmudov (yellow card) 17'; Petrov (yellow card) 90'; Aliyev (yellow card) 90+4' | Stadium: Tofiq Bahramov Republican Stadium; Attendance: 7,000; Referee: Aliyar Ağayev |

| 23 September 2019 5 | Zira | 1 – 3 | Qarabağ | Zirə |
| 19:00 AZT (UTC+4) | Rodríguez 88'; Ampuero (yellow card) 90+3' | Report | Gueye 12'; B.Huseynov (yellow card) 18'; Romero 41'; Papazoglou 44' (o.g.); Sadygov (yellow card) 90' | Stadium: Zira Olympic Sport Complex Stadium; Attendance: 1,200; Referee: Rauf Jabbarov |

| 27 September 2019 6 | Qarabağ | 2 – 0 | Sumgayit | Baku |
| 19:00 AZT (UTC+4) | A.Huseynov (yellow card) 44'; Quintana 45+2'; Míchel (yellow card) 81'; Emreli 90' | Report | S.Aliyev (yellow card) 31'; Mustafayev (yellow card) 53'; E.Badalov (yellow card) 57' | Stadium: Tofiq Bahramov Republican Stadium; Attendance: 700; Referee: Elcin Məsiyev |

| 6 October 2019 7 | Qarabağ | 2 – 0 | Sabah | Baku |
| 20:30 AZT (UTC+4) | Gueye (yellow card) 4' (goal) 16'; Emreli (yellow card) 6'; A.Huseynov 50'; Richard (yellow card) 83' | Report | Diniyev (yellow card) 33'; Mustafazade (red card) 79'; Eyyubov (yellow card) 83' | Stadium: Tofiq Bahramov Republican Stadium; Attendance: 1,400; Referee: Vugar Həsənli |

| 20 October 2019 8 | Gabala | 1 – 1 | Qarabağ | Qabala |
| 17:00 AZT (UTC+4) | G.Aliyev 3' (yellow card) 70'; Gigauri (yellow card) 34'; Mammadov (yellow card) 45+3'; R.Huseynov (yellow card) 57'; A.Seydiyev (yellow card) 67'; Ferreiroa (yellow card) 87' | Report | I.Ibrahimli 9' (yellow card) 90+1'; Zoubir (yellow card) 87' | Stadium: Gabala City Stadium; Attendance: 1,000; Referee: Aliyar Ağayev |

| 28 October 2019 9 | Qarabağ | 1 – 0 | Sabail | Baku |
| 19:00 AZT (UTC+4) | Míchel (yellow card) 85'; Garayev 87' | Report | E.Rəhimli (yellow card) 46'; Abbasov (yellow card) 80' | Stadium: Tofiq Bahramov Republican Stadium; Attendance: 1,000; Referee: Orkhan Məmmədov |

| 1 November 2019 10 | Neftçi | 0 – 0 | Qarabağ | Baku |
| 20:00 AZT (UTC+4) | Mahmudov (yellow card) 41'; Akhundov (yellow card) 68' | Report | Míchel (yellow card) 3'; Medvedev (yellow card) 8'; Mammadov (yellow card) 60'; Begović (yellow card) 90+9' | Stadium: Eighth Kilometer District Stadium; Attendance: 3,000; Referee: Ingilab Məmmədov |

| 10 November 2019 11 | Qarabağ | 1 – 1 | Zira | Baku |
| 19:00 AZT (UTC+4) | Gueye 5' | Report | Mutallimov (yellow card) 30'; Huseynov (yellow card) 37'; Gadze (yellow card) 45+2' (goal) 70'; Bakrač (yellow card) 55'; Kgaswane (yellow card) 67' | Stadium: Tofiq Bahramov Republican Stadium; Attendance: 600; Referee: Aliyar Ağayev |

| 22 November 2019 12 | Sumgayit | 2 – 1 | Qarabağ | Sumqayit |
| 19:00 AZT (UTC+4) | Mustafayev (yellow card) 36'; Isayev (yellow card) 59'; Babaei 65', 69' (yellow card) 68'; E.Jafarguliyev (yellow card) 89'; Agayev (yellow card) 90+1' | Report | Romero 36'; I.Ibrahimli (red card) 72'; Míchel (yellow card) 90+2'; Emreli (yellow card) 90+2' | Stadium: Kapital Bank Arena; Attendance: 1,200; Referee: Rauf Jabbarov |

| 2 December 2019 13 | Sabah | 0 – 1 | Qarabağ | Masazır |
| 20:00 AZT (UTC+4) | Ivanović (yellow card) 45+2' | Report | Richard (yellow card) 20'; Zoubir 74' | Stadium: Bank Respublika Arena; Attendance: 3,000; Referee: Aliyar Ağayev |

| 6 December 2019 14 | Qarabağ | 2 – 2 | Keşla | Baku |
| 19:00 AZT (UTC+4) | Quintana 4'; Ailton (yellow card) 38'; Emreli 45' | Report | J.Amirli (yellow card) 37'; H.Hajili 41' (o.g.); Namașco (yellow card) 45'; T.Bayramli 47'; Qirtimov (yellow card) 64' | Stadium: Tofiq Bahramov Republican Stadium; Attendance: 500; Referee: Kamal Umudlu |
Note: Qarabağ played their home matches at Tofiq Bahramov Republican Stadium, Baku, instead of their regular home stadium Azersun Arena, Baku.

| 2 February 2020 15 | Sabail | 0 – 1 | Qarabağ | Baku |
| 17:30 AZT (UTC+4) | Aliyev (yellow card) 90+1' | Report | Míchel (yellow card) 23'; B.Huseynov (yellow card) 28'; Emreli 81'; Medvedev (yellow card) 90+2'; Mahammadaliyev (yellow card) 90+5' | Stadium: Bayil Arena; Attendance: 1,000; Referee: Ingilab Məmmədov |

| 8 February 2020 16 | Qarabağ | 0 – 0 | Neftçi | Baku |
| 20:00 AZT (UTC+4) | Romero (yellow card) 48'; Ailton (yellow card) 81' | Report | Guerrier (yellow card) 84' | Stadium: Tofiq Bahramov Republican Stadium; Attendance: 3,200; Referee: Rauf Jabbarov |
Note: Qarabağ played their home matches at Tofiq Bahramov Republican Stadium, Baku, instead of their regular home stadium Azersun Arena, Baku.

| 15 February 2020 17 | Zira | 0 – 6 | Qarabağ | Zirə |
| 15:00 AZT (UTC+4) | Mutallimov (yellow card) 52'; J.Huseynov (red card) 67'; N.Suleymanov (yellow card) 74'; Jamalov (yellow card) 90' | Report | B.Huseynov 4'; Romero 11' (yellow card) 90'; Emreli 14'; Ailton 28' (yellow card) 52'; Zoubir 61'; Gueye 85' | Stadium: Zira Olympic Sport Complex Stadium; Attendance: 1,000; Referee: Rahim Həsənov |

| 23 February 2020 18 | Qarabağ | 1 – 0 | Sumgayit | Baku |
| 18:00 AZT (UTC+4) | T.Bayramov (yellow card) 20'; Míchel (yellow card) 41'; Emreli 49' (yellow card) 74' (yellow-red card) 90+2'; Mahammadaliyev (yellow card) 90+5' | Report | P.Najafov (yellow card) 60'; Isayev (yellow card) 62'; Yunanov (yellow card) 86' | Stadium: Tofiq Bahramov Republican Stadium; Attendance: 600; Referee: Ravan Həmzəzadə |
Note: Qarabağ played their home matches at Tofiq Bahramov Republican Stadium, Baku, instead of their regular home stadium Azersun Arena, Baku.

| 29 February 2020 19 | Qarabağ | 0 – 0 | Sabah | Baku |
| 18:00 AZT (UTC+4) | Sadygov (yellow card) 90+1'; Garayev (yellow card) 90+5' | Report | Stamenković (yellow card) 43'; Marina (yellow card) 84' | Stadium: Tofiq Bahramov Republican Stadium; Attendance: 300; Referee: Elcin Məsiyev |

| 8 March 2020 20 | Keşla | 0 – 2 | Qarabağ | Baku |
| 18:00 AZT (UTC+4) | P.Azadov (yellow card) 58'; Christovão (yellow card) 60'; Gadoyev (yellow card) 80'; Isgandarli (yellow card) 87'; Qirtimov (yellow card) 90+3' | Report | Zoubir 31' (yellow card) 90+3'; Ozobić 87'; B.Huseynov (yellow card) 90+1'; Gueye (yellow card) 90+3' | Stadium: ASK Arena; Attendance: 2,000; Referee: Aliyar Ağayev |

| 13 March 2020 21 | Qarabağ | – | Gabala | Baku |
| AZT (UTC+4) | | | | Stadium: Tofiq Bahramov Republican Stadium |
Note: Match postponed on 13 March due to the COVID-19 pandemic.

| 21 March 2020 22 | Neftçi | – | Qarabağ | Baku |
| AZT (UTC+4) | | | | Stadium: Eighth Kilometer District Stadium |
Note: Match postponed on 13 March due to the COVID-19 pandemic.

==== League table ====
| Pos | Team | Pld | W | D | L | GF | GA | GD | Pts | Qualification or relegation |
|---|---|---|---|---|---|---|---|---|---|---|
| 1 | Qarabağ (C) | 20 | 13 | 6 | 1 | 34 | 7 | +27 | 45 | Qualification for the Champions League first qualifying round |
| 2 | Neftçi Baku | 20 | 10 | 7 | 3 | 33 | 14 | +19 | 37 | Qualification for the Europa League first qualifying round |
| 3 | Keşla | 20 | 8 | 6 | 6 | 27 | 21 | +6 | 30 | Qualification for the Europa League first qualifying round |
| 4 | Sumgayit | 20 | 6 | 5 | 9 | 24 | 32 | −8 | 23 | Qualification for the Europa League first qualifying round |
| 5 | Zira | 20 | 6 | 5 | 9 | 25 | 37 | −12 | 23 | |

Source: Soccerway
Rules for classification: 1) Points; 2) Head-to-head points; 3) Head-to-head goal difference; 4) Head-to-head goals scored; 5) Head-to-head away goals scored (only if two teams); 6) Goal difference; 7) Goals scored.
(C) Champions

=== Azerbaijan Cup ===
| 16 December 2019 Quarterfinal 1st leg | Qarabağ | 1 – 0 | Keşla | Baku |
| 20:00 AZT (UTC+4) | I.Ibrahimli 53' (yellow card) 77' | Report | Sadygov (yellow card) 82' | Stadium: Tofiq Bahramov Republican Stadium; Attendance: 500; Referee: Sabuhi Bayramov |
Note: Qarabağ played their home match at Tofiq Bahramov Republican Stadium, Baku, instead of their regular stadium Azersun Arena, Baku.

| 20 December 2019 Quarterfinal 2nd leg | Keşla | 1 – 3 (1 – 4 agg.) | Qarabağ | Baku |
| 20:00 AZT (UTC+4) | T.Bayramli (yellow card) 25'; Isgandarli (yellow card) 45+2'; X.Mahmudov (yellow card) 59' (goal) 67' | Report | Medvedev (yellow card) 19'; Emreli 20'; Romero 40'; Ailton (yellow card) 78'; T.Bayramov 90+2' | Stadium: Bayil Arena; Attendance: 1,000; Referee: Rauf Jabbarov |
Note: Match played at the Bayil Arena in Baku, instead of Keşla's regular ASK Arena in Baku.

| 21 April 2020 Semifinal 1st leg | Sumgayit | – | Qarabağ | Sumqayit |
| AZT (UTC+4) | | | | Stadium: Kapital Bank Arena |
Note: Match postponed due to the COVID-19 pandemic

| 28 April 2020 Semifinal 2nd leg | Qarabağ | – (– agg.) | Sumgayit | Baku |
| AZT (UTC+4) | | | | Stadium: Tofiq Bahramov Republican Stadium |
Note: Match postponed due to the COVID-19 pandemic

=== UEFA Champions League ===
==== Qualifying rounds ====
| 10 July 2019 First qualifying round 1st leg | Partizani Tirana (Albania) | 0 – 0 | (Azerbaijan) Qarabağ | Tirana, Albania |
| 19:30 AZT (UTC+4) | Çinari (yellow card) 83' | Report | | Stadium: Selman Stërmasi Stadium; Attendance: 2,120; Referee: Thorvaldur Árnason (Iceland) |

| 17 July 2019 First qualifying round 2nd leg | Qarabağ (Azerbaijan) | 2 – 0 (2 – 0 agg.) | (Albania) Partizani Tirana | Baku, Azerbaijan |
| 21:00 AZT (UTC+4) | Medvedev (yellow card) 39'; Míchel (yellow card) 41'; Ozobić 51'; Mammadov (yellow card) 54'; Quintana 90+4' | Report | Hakaj (yellow card) 64'; Ekuban (yellow card) 90+2' | Stadium: Dalga Arena; Attendance: 5,932; Referee: Dumitru Muntean (Moldova) |
Note: Qarabağ played their home match at Dalga Arena, Baku, instead of their regular stadium Azersun Arena, Baku.

| 24 July 2019 Second qualifying round 1st leg | Dundalk (Republic of Ireland) | 1 – 1 | (Azerbaijan) Qarabağ | Dundalk, Republic of Ireland |
| 22:45 AZT (UTC+4) | Hoban 78' | Report | Emreli 4'; Ailton (yellow card) 45+3'; Slavchev (yellow card) 62' | Stadium: Oriel Park; Attendance: 3,100; Referee: Bartosz Frankowski (Poland) |

| 31 July 2019 Second qualifying round 2nd leg | Qarabağ (Azerbaijan) | 3 – 0 (4 – 1 agg.) | (Republic of Ireland) Dundalk | Baku, Azerbaijan |
| 21:00 AZT (UTC+4) | Romero 12', 87'; Ailton 76' | Report | | Stadium: Dalga Arena; Attendance: 5,832; Referee: Svein Oddvar Moen (Norway) |
Note: Qarabağ played their home match at Dalga Arena, Baku, instead of their regular stadium Azersun Arena, Baku.

| 6 August 2019 Third qualifying round 1st leg | APOEL (Cyprus) | 1 – 2 | (Azerbaijan) Qarabağ | Nicosia, Cyprus |
| 21:00 AZT (UTC+4) | Merkis (yellow card) 31' (goal) 90+5'; Gentsoglou (yellow card) 50' | Report | Sadygov (yellow card) 47'; Emreli 54'; Mammadov (yellow card) 57'; Gueye 69'; Medvedev (yellow card) 71' | Stadium: GSP Stadium; Attendance: 9,481; Referee: Davide Massa (Italy) |

| 13 August 2019 Third qualifying round 2nd leg | Qarabağ (Azerbaijan) | 0 – 2 (2 – 3 agg.) | (Cyprus) APOEL | Baku, Azerbaijan |
| AZT (UTC+4) | Mammadov (yellow card) 64'; Richard (yellow card) 90+1' (yellow-red card) 90+3' | Report | De Vincenti (yellow card) 30' (goal) 34' (pen.); Matić 68'; Al-Taamari (yellow card) 90+1' | Stadium: Dalga Arena; Attendance: 31,531; Referee: Daniel Siebert (Germany) |
Note: Qarabağ played their home match at Dalga Arena, Baku, instead of their regular stadium Azersun Arena, Baku.

=== UEFA Europa League ===
==== Qualifying rounds ====
| 22 August 2019 Playoff round 1st leg | Linfield (Northern Ireland) | 3 – 2 | (Azerbaijan) Qarabağ | Belfast, Northern Ireland |
| 22:45 AZT (UTC+4) | Stafford (yellow card) 29' (goal) 40'; Lavery 45+1', 75'; Cooper (yellow card) 54' | Report | Rherras 15' (yellow card) 89'; Míchel (yellow card) 68'; Emreli (yellow card) 87'; Gueye 90+2' (pen.) | Stadium: Windsor Park; Attendance: 4,633; Referee: Sandro Schärer (Switzerland) |

| 29 August 2019 Playoff round 2nd leg | Qarabağ (Azerbaijan) | 2 – 1 (a 4 – 4 agg.) | (Northern Ireland) Linfield | Baku, Azerbaijan |
| 20:00 AZT (UTC+4) | Jaime Romero 6'; Ailton (yellow card) 63'; Richard (yellow card) 82'; Míchel (yellow card) 86'; Zoubir 88'; Garayev (yellow card) 90+2' | Report | M.Stafford (yellow card) 61'; Lavery 90+3' | Stadium: Tofiq Bahramov Republican Stadium; Attendance: 18,349; Referee: Sergey Ivanov (Russia) |
Note: Qarabağ played their home match at Tofiq Bahramov Republican Stadium, Baku, instead of their regular stadium Azersun Arena, Baku.

==== Group stage ====
| Pos | Team | Pld | W | D | L | GF | GA | GD | Pts | Qualification |
|---|---|---|---|---|---|---|---|---|---|---|
| 1 | (Spain) Sevilla | 6 | 5 | 0 | 1 | 14 | 3 | +11 | 15 | Advance to knockout phase |
| 2 | (Cyprus) APOEL | 6 | 3 | 1 | 2 | 10 | 8 | +2 | 10 | Advance to knockout phase |
| 3 | (Azerbaijan) Qarabağ | 6 | 1 | 2 | 3 | 8 | 11 | −3 | 5 | |
| 4 | (Luxembourg) F91 Dudelange | 6 | 1 | 1 | 4 | 8 | 18 | −10 | 4 | |

Source: UEFA
Rules for classification: Group stage tiebreakers

| 19 September 2019 1 | Qarabağ (Azerbaijan) | 0 – 3 | (Spain) Sevilla | Baku, Azerbaijan |
| 20:55 AZT (UTC+4) | Ailton (yellow card) 36'; Medvedev (yellow card) 73' | Report | Hernández 62'; Munir 78'; Torres 85'; Gudelj (yellow card) 90+2' | Stadium: Tofiq Bahramov Republican Stadium; Attendance: 30,826; Referee: Yevhen Aranovskyi (Ukraine) |
Note: Qarabağ played their home matches at Tofiq Bahramov Republican Stadium, Baku, instead of their regular home stadium Azersun Arena, Baku.

| 3 October 2019 2 | F91 Dudelange (Luxembourg) | 1 – 4 | (Azerbaijan) Qarabağ | Luxembourg City, Luxembourg |
| 23:00 AZT (UTC+4) | Garos (yellow card) 36' (yellow-red card) 62'; Lesquoy (yellow card) 82'; Bernier 90' | Report | Zoubir 11'; Míchel 30'; Almeida 37' (pen.); Quintana 69' | Stadium: Stade Josy Barthel; Attendance: 3,005; Referee: John Beaton (Scotland) |
Note: F91 Dudelange played their home matches at Stade Josy Barthel, Luxembourg City, instead of their regular home stadium Stade Jos Nosbaum, Dudelange.

| 24 October 2019 3 | Qarabağ (Azerbaijan) | 2 – 2 | (Cyprus) APOEL | Baku, Azerbaijan |
| 20:55 AZT (UTC+4) | Quintana 13'; Ailton 58'; Emreli (yellow card) 90+3' | Report | Ioannou 29'; Hallenius 45'; Souza (yellow card) 51'; Vouros (yellow card) 90+1'; Savić (yellow card) 90+3' | Stadium: Tofiq Bahramov Republican Stadium; Attendance: 30,824; Referee: Filip Glova (Slovakia) |
Note: Qarabağ played their home matches at Tofiq Bahramov Republican Stadium, Baku, instead of their regular home stadium Azersun Arena, Baku.

| 7 November 2019 4 | APOEL (Cyprus) | 2 – 1 | (Azerbaijan) Qarabağ | Nicosia, Cyprus |
| 21:55 AZT (UTC+4) | Souza 59' (yellow card) 61'; Ioannou 88'; Bezjak (yellow card) 90+1'; Vouros (yellow card) 90+6' | Report | Medvedev 10'; Richard (yellow card) 34'; Míchel (yellow card) 71'; Begović (yellow card) 84'; Garayev (yellow card) 90+6'; Sadygov (yellow card) 90+6' | Stadium: GSP Stadium; Attendance: 9,432; Referee: Manuel Schüttengruber (Austria) |

| 29 November 2019 5 | Sevilla (Spain) | 2 – 0 | (Azerbaijan) Qarabağ | Seville, Spain |
| 00:00 AZT (UTC+4) | Gil 61'; Dabour 90+2' | Report | | Stadium: Ramón Sánchez Pizjuán; Attendance: 19,803; Referee: Mohammed Al-Hakim (Sweden) |

| 12 December 2019 6 | Qarabağ (Azerbaijan) | 1 – 1 | (Luxembourg) F91 Dudelange | Baku, Azerbaijan |
| 21:55 AZT (UTC+4) | Garayev (yellow card) 30' (yellow-red card) 46'; Míchel (yellow card) 66' Gueye 90+1' | Report | C.Morren (yellow card) 53'; Bougrine 63' A.Bernier (yellow card) 71' | Stadium: Tofiq Bahramov Republican Stadium; Referee: Kristo Tohver (Estonia) |
Note: Qarabağ played their home matches at Tofiq Bahramov Republican Stadium, Baku, instead of their regular home stadium Azersun Arena, Baku.

== Squad statistics ==
As of Match played 8 March 2020

=== Appearances and goals ===
| No. | Pos | Nat | Player | Total | | Premier League | | Azerbaijan Cup | | Champions League | | Europa League | |
| No. | Pos | Nat | Player | Apps | Goals | Apps | Goals | Apps | Goals | Apps | Goals | Apps | Goals |
|---|---|---|---|---|---|---|---|---|---|---|---|---|---|
| 2 | MF | (Azerbaijan) AZE | Gara Garayev | 29 | 1 | 13+3 | 1 | 2 | 0 | 1+2 | 0 | 7+1 | 0 |
| 3 | DF | (Brazil) BRA | Ailton | 29 | 3 | 13+2 | 1 | 0+1 | 0 | 6 | 1 | 7 | 1 |
| 4 | DF | (Azerbaijan) AZE | Rahil Mammadov | 18 | 0 | 8 | 0 | 2 | 0 | 6 | 0 | 2 | 0 |
| 5 | DF | (Azerbaijan) AZE | Maksim Medvedev | 33 | 1 | 16+1 | 0 | 2 | 0 | 6 | 0 | 8 | 1 |
| 7 | MF | (Azerbaijan) AZE | Araz Abdullayev | 22 | 0 | 6+5 | 0 | 1 | 0 | 1+4 | 0 | 1+4 | 0 |
| 8 | MF | (Spain) ESP | Míchel | 25 | 1 | 9+3 | 0 | 0 | 0 | 5 | 0 | 8 | 1 |
| 9 | FW | (Spain) ESP | Jaime Romero | 27 | 7 | 10+3 | 3 | 2 | 1 | 5+1 | 2 | 4+2 | 1 |
| 11 | FW | (Azerbaijan) AZE | Mahir Emreli | 30 | 10 | 12+4 | 7 | 1+1 | 1 | 5+1 | 2 | 4+2 | 0 |
| 12 | GK | (Azerbaijan) AZE | Shahrudin Mahammadaliyev | 11 | 0 | 10 | 0 | 0 | 0 | 0 | 0 | 1 | 0 |
| 13 | GK | (Brazil) BRA | Vagner | 8 | 0 | 0 | 0 | 0 | 0 | 6 | 0 | 2 | 0 |
| 14 | DF | (Azerbaijan) AZE | Rashad Sadygov | 22 | 0 | 10 | 0 | 0 | 0 | 6 | 0 | 6 | 0 |
| 17 | MF | (France) FRA | Abdellah Zoubir | 35 | 7 | 14+5 | 5 | 1+1 | 0 | 6 | 0 | 8 | 2 |
| 18 | MF | (Azerbaijan) AZE | Ismayil Ibrahimli | 21 | 5 | 15+2 | 4 | 2 | 1 | 0 | 0 | 1+1 | 0 |
| 19 | MF | (Croatia) CRO | Filip Ozobić | 8 | 2 | 3+2 | 1 | 0 | 0 | 3 | 1 | 0 | 0 |
| 21 | MF | (Azerbaijan) AZE | Hajiagha Hajili | 7 | 0 | 5+2 | 0 | 0 | 0 | 0 | 0 | 0 | 0 |
| 23 | DF | (Morocco) MAR | Faycal Rherras | 9 | 1 | 6 | 0 | 2 | 0 | 0 | 0 | 1 | 1 |
| 27 | FW | (Ghana) GHA | Owusu Kwabena | 5 | 0 | 2+3 | 0 | 0 | 0 | 0 | 0 | 0 | 0 |
| 29 | FW | (Azerbaijan) AZE | Musa Qurbanlı | 1 | 0 | 0 | 0 | 0+1 | 0 | 0 | 0 | 0 | 0 |
| 30 | DF | (Azerbaijan) AZE | Abbas Huseynov | 22 | 1 | 11+4 | 1 | 0 | 0 | 1+2 | 0 | 3+1 | 0 |
| 55 | DF | (Azerbaijan) AZE | Badavi Huseynov | 22 | 1 | 14 | 1 | 2 | 0 | 0 | 0 | 6 | 0 |
| 71 | MF | (Azerbaijan) AZE | Tural Bayramov | 3 | 1 | 1+1 | 0 | 0+1 | 1 | 0 | 0 | 0 | 0 |
Players away on loan:
Players who left Qarabağ during the season:
| 1 | GK | (Bosnia and Herzegovina) BIH | Asmir Begović | 17 | 0 | 10 | 0 | 2 | 0 | 0 | 0 | 5 | 0 |
| 6 | MF | (Bulgaria) BUL | Simeon Slavchev | 8 | 0 | 2 | 0 | 0 | 0 | 3+2 | 0 | 0+1 | 0 |
| 10 | MF | (Spain) ESP | Dani Quintana | 24 | 6 | 9+2 | 3 | 0+1 | 0 | 1+3 | 1 | 5+3 | 2 |
| 20 | MF | (Azerbaijan) AZE | Richard | 29 | 2 | 12+2 | 1 | 2 | 0 | 6 | 0 | 6+1 | 1 |
| 99 | FW | (Senegal) SEN | Magaye Gueye | 28 | 8 | 9+9 | 5 | 1 | 0 | 0+2 | 1 | 3+4 | 2 |

=== Goal scorers ===
| Place | Position | Nation | Number | Name | Premier League | Azerbaijan Cup | Champions League | Europa League | Total |
|---|---|---|---|---|---|---|---|---|---|
| 1 | FW | (Azerbaijan) | 11 | Mahir Emreli | 7 | 1 | 2 | 0 | 10 |
| 2 | FW | (Senegal) | 99 | Magaye Gueye | 5 | 0 | 1 | 2 | 8 |
| 4 | MF | (France) | 17 | Abdellah Zoubir | 5 | 0 | 0 | 2 | 7 |
| 4 | FW | (Spain) | 9 | Jaime Romero | 3 | 1 | 2 | 1 | 7 |
| 5 | MF | (Spain) | 10 | Dani Quintana | 3 | 0 | 1 | 2 | 6 |
| 6 | MF | (Azerbaijan) | 18 | Ismayil Ibrahimli | 4 | 1 | 0 | 0 | 5 |
| 7 | DF | (Brazil) | 3 | Ailton | 1 | 0 | 1 | 1 | 3 |
| 8 | MF | (Croatia) | 19 | Filip Ozobić | 1 | 0 | 1 | 0 | 2 |
| 8 | MF | (Azerbaijan) | 20 | Richard | 1 | 0 | 0 | 1 | 2 |
| 10 | DF | (Azerbaijan) | 30 | Abbas Huseynov | 1 | 0 | 0 | 0 | 1 |
| 10 | MF | (Azerbaijan) | 2 | Gara Garayev | 1 | 0 | 0 | 0 | 1 |
| 10 | DF | (Azerbaijan) | 55 | Badavi Huseynov | 1 | 0 | 0 | 0 | 1 |
| 10 | MF | (Azerbaijan) | 71 | Tural Bayramov | 0 | 1 | 0 | 0 | 1 |
| 10 | DF | (Morocco) | 23 | Faycal Rherras | 0 | 0 | 0 | 1 | 1 |
| 10 | MF | (Spain) | 8 | Míchel | 0 | 0 | 0 | 1 | 1 |
| 10 | DF | (Azerbaijan) | 5 | Maksim Medvedev | 0 | 0 | 0 | 1 | 1 |
| 10 | | | | Own goal | 1 | 0 | 0 | 0 | 1 |
| | | | | TOTALS | 34 | 4 | 8 | 10 | 56 |

=== Clean sheets ===
| Place | Position | Nation | Number | Name | Premier League | Azerbaijan Cup | Champions League | Europa League | Total |
|---|---|---|---|---|---|---|---|---|---|
| 1 | GK | (Azerbaijan) | 12 | Shahrudin Mahammadaliyev | 9 | 0 | 0 | 0 | 9 |
| 2 | GK | (Bosnia and Herzegovina) | 1 | Asmir Begović | 6 | 1 | 0 | 0 | 7 |
| 3 | GK | (Brazil) | 13 | Vagner | 0 | 0 | 3 | 0 | 3 |
| | | | | TOTALS | 15 | 1 | 3 | 0 | 19 |

=== Disciplinary record ===
| Number | Nation | Position | Name | Premier League | | Azerbaijan Cup | | Champions League | | Europa League | | Total | |
| Number | Nation | Position | Name | Yellow card | Red card | Yellow card | Red card | Yellow card | Red card | Yellow card | Red card | Yellow card | Red card |
| 2 | (Azerbaijan) | DF | Gara Garayev | 1 | 0 | 0 | 0 | 0 | 0 | 4 | 1 | 5 | 1 |
| 3 | (Brazil) | DF | Ailton | 4 | 0 | 1 | 0 | 1 | 0 | 2 | 0 | 8 | 0 |
| 4 | (Azerbaijan) | DF | Rahil Mammadov | 2 | 0 | 0 | 0 | 3 | 0 | 0 | 0 | 5 | 0 |
| 5 | (Azerbaijan) | DF | Maksim Medvedev | 3 | 0 | 1 | 0 | 2 | 0 | 1 | 0 | 7 | 0 |
| 7 | (Azerbaijan) | MF | Araz Abdullayev | 1 | 0 | 0 | 0 | 0 | 0 | 0 | 0 | 1 | 0 |
| 8 | (Spain) | MF | Míchel | 6 | 0 | 0 | 0 | 1 | 0 | 4 | 0 | 11 | 0 |
| 9 | (Spain) | FW | Jaime Romero | 2 | 0 | 0 | 0 | 0 | 0 | 0 | 0 | 2 | 0 |
| 11 | (Azerbaijan) | FW | Mahir Emreli | 5 | 1 | 0 | 0 | 0 | 0 | 2 | 0 | 7 | 1 |
| 12 | (Azerbaijan) | GK | Shahrudin Mahammadaliyev | 2 | 0 | 0 | 0 | 0 | 0 | 0 | 0 | 2 | 0 |
| 14 | (Azerbaijan) | DF | Rashad Sadygov | 2 | 0 | 0 | 0 | 1 | 0 | 1 | 0 | 4 | 0 |
| 17 | (France) | MF | Abdellah Zoubir | 2 | 0 | 0 | 0 | 0 | 0 | 0 | 0 | 2 | 0 |
| 18 | (Azerbaijan) | MF | Ismayil Ibrahimli | 1 | 1 | 1 | 0 | 0 | 0 | 0 | 0 | 2 | 1 |
| 23 | (Morocco) | DF | Faycal Rherras | 1 | 0 | 0 | 0 | 0 | 0 | 1 | 0 | 2 | 0 |
| 30 | (Azerbaijan) | DF | Abbas Huseynov | 1 | 0 | 0 | 0 | 0 | 0 | 0 | 0 | 1 | 0 |
| 55 | (Azerbaijan) | DF | Badavi Huseynov | 3 | 0 | 0 | 0 | 0 | 0 | 0 | 0 | 3 | 0 |
| 71 | (Azerbaijan) | MF | Tural Bayramov | 1 | 0 | 0 | 0 | 0 | 0 | 0 | 0 | 1 | 0 |
Players who left Qarabağ during the season:
| 1 | (Bosnia and Herzegovina) | GK | Asmir Begović | 1 | 0 | 0 | 0 | 0 | 0 | 1 | 0 | 2 | 0 |
| 6 | (Bulgaria) | MF | Simeon Slavchev | 0 | 0 | 0 | 0 | 1 | 0 | 0 | 0 | 1 | 0 |
| 20 | (Azerbaijan) | MF | Richard | 3 | 0 | 0 | 0 | 2 | 1 | 2 | 0 | 7 | 1 |
| 99 | (Senegal) | FW | Magaye Gueye | 2 | 0 | 0 | 0 | 0 | 0 | 0 | 0 | 2 | 0 |
| | | | TOTALS | 41 | 2 | 3 | 0 | 11 | 1 | 18 | 1 | 73 | 4 |
