= 2019–20 Keşla FK season =

Keşla
2019–20 season
- Manager: Tarlan Ahmadov
- Stadium: Inter Arena
- Premier League: 3rd
- Azerbaijan Cup: Quarterfinal vs Qarabağ
- Top goalscorer: League: Lorenzo Frutos (6); All: Lorenzo Frutos (6)

The Keşla 2019–20 season was Keşla's second full season since the changed their name on 28 October 2017, and the nineteenth Azerbaijan Premier League season.

== Season events ==
On 13 March 2020, the Azerbaijan Premier League was postponed due to the COVID-19 pandemic.

On 19 June 2020, the AFFA announced that the 2019–20 season had been officially ended without the resumption of the remains matches due to the escalating situation of the COVID-19 pandemic in Azerbaijan.

On 22 June, Vusal Isgandarli, Azer Salahli, Tarlan Guliyev and Ruslan Amirjanov all signed a new contracts with Keşla, until the end of the 2020–21 season.

On 25 June, John Kamara signed a new contract with Keşla for the 2020–21 season.

On 26 June, Rashad Azizli and Ilkin Qirtimov signed new one-year contracts with Keşla.

== Squad ==
As of match played 8 March 2020

| No. | Name | Nationality | Position | Date of birth (age) | Signed from | Signed in | Contract ends | Apps. | Goals |
Goalkeepers
| 1 | Stanislav Namașco | (Moldova) | GK | 10 November 1986 (aged 33) | Zeta | 2019 | 2020 | 22 | 0 |
| 94 | Rashad Azizli | (Azerbaijan) | GK | 1 January 1994 (aged 26) | Sumgayit | 2019 | 2021 | 1 | 0 |
Defenders
| 2 | Ilkin Qirtimov | (Azerbaijan) | DF | 4 November 1990 (aged 29) | Zira | 2019 | 2021 | 100 | 3 |
| 3 | Jabir Amirli | (Azerbaijan) | DF | 6 January 1997 (aged 23) | | 2018 | | 42 | 1 |
| 4 | Slavik Alkhasov | (Azerbaijan) | DF | 6 February 1993 (aged 27) | Sumgayit | 2016 | 2020 | 98 | 11 |
| 5 | Franco Flores | (Argentina) | DF | 10 November 1986 (aged 33) | Alki Oroklini | 2019 | 2020 | 20 | 1 |
| 18 | Ruslan Amirjanov | (Azerbaijan) | DF | 1 February 1985 (aged 35) | Sabail | 2018 | 2021 | 2 | 1 |
| 19 | Azer Salahli | (Azerbaijan) | DF | 11 April 1994 (aged 26) | Sumgayit | 2018 | 2021 | 27 | 0 |
| 21 | Mijuško Bojović | (Montenegro) | DF | 9 August 1988 (aged 31) | Újpest | 2019 | 2020 | 19 | 2 |
| 33 | Tarlan Guliyev | (Azerbaijan) | DF | 19 April 1992 (aged 28) | Qarabağ | 2016 | 2021 | 92 | 1 |
Midfielders
| 6 | Rashad Sadygov | (Azerbaijan) | MF | 8 October 1983 (aged 36) | | 2019 | 2020 | 7 | 0 |
| 7 | Tural Bayramli | (Azerbaijan) | MF | 7 January 1998 (aged 22) | BFC Daugavpils | 2019 | | 21 | 2 |
| 8 | Zija Azizov | (Azerbaijan) | MF | 4 October 1998 (aged 21) | NEC Nijmegen | 2019 | 2020 | 0 | 0 |
| 10 | César Meza | (Paraguay) | MF | 5 October 1991 (aged 28) | loan from Universitatea Craiova | 2019 | 2020 | 82 | 13 |
| 13 | Parviz Azadov | (Azerbaijan) | MF | 19 October 2000 (aged 19) | Academy | 2019 | | 6 | 1 |
| 17 | Vusal Isgandarli | (Azerbaijan) | MF | 3 November 1995 (aged 24) | Zira | 2019 | 2021 | 36 | 4 |
| 22 | Afran Ismayilov | (Azerbaijan) | MF | 8 October 1988 (aged 31) | Sumgayit | 2019 | 2020 | 31 | 4 |
| 25 | John Kamara | (Sierra Leone) | MF | 12 May 1988 (aged 32) | Kaisar | 2019 | 2021 | 33 | 1 |
| 30 | Shohrux Gadoyev | (Uzbekistan) | MF | 31 December 1991 (aged 28) | Bunyodkor | 2020 | 2021 | 6 | 2 |
| 90 | Orxan Faracov | (Azerbaijan) | MF | 7 January 2001 (aged 19) | Academy | 2019 | | 4 | 0 |
Forwards
| 9 | Lorenzo Frutos | (Paraguay) | FW | 4 June 1989 (aged 31) | Deportivo Lara | 2019 | 2020 | 17 | 6 |
| 11 | Ruslan Gurbanov | (Azerbaijan) | FW | 12 September 1991 (aged 28) | Sabail | 2019 | 2020 | 17 | 2 |
| 42 | Alexander Christovão | (Angola) | FW | 14 March 1993 (aged 27) | Al-Mujazzal | 2020 | 2020 | 6 | 0 |
| 71 | Emin Guliyev | (Azerbaijan) | FW | 9 January 1998 (aged 22) | | 2018 | | 0 | 0 |
| 97 | Xazar Mahmudov | (Azerbaijan) | FW | 23 November 2000 (aged 19) | Academy | 2019 | | 4 | 3 |
Left during the season
| 14 | Emin Mehdiyev | (Azerbaijan) | MF | 22 September 1992 (aged 27) | | 2019 | 2020 | 10 | 0 |
| 16 | Shahin Zakiyev | (Azerbaijan) | GK | 11 June 1999 (aged 21) | Trainee | 2015 | | 2 | 0 |
| 66 | Murad Gayali | (Azerbaijan) | DF | 9 March 1999 (aged 21) | Trainee | 2019 | | 0 | 0 |

== Transfers ==
=== In ===
| Date | Position | Nationality | Name | From | Fee | Ref. |
|---|---|---|---|---|---|---|
| 3 June 2019 | GK | (Azerbaijan) | Rashad Azizli | Sumgayit | Undisclosed | |
| 10 June 2019 | FW | (Azerbaijan) | Ruslan Gurbanov | Sabail | Undisclosed | |
| 17 June 2019 | DF | (Argentina) | Franco Flores | Alki Oroklini | Undisclosed | |
| 19 June 2019 | MF | (Azerbaijan) | Zija Azizov | NEC Nijmegen | Undislosed | |
| 5 July 2019 | GK | (Moldova) | Stanislav Namașco | Zeta | Undisclosed | |
| 8 July 2019 | DF | (Azerbaijan) | Ilkin Qirtimov | Zira | Undisclosed | |
| 8 July 2019 | DF | (Azerbaijan) | Emin Mehdiyev | | | |
| 11 July 2019 | DF | (Montenegro) | Mijuško Bojović | Újpest | Undisclosed | |
| 8 August 2019 | FW | (Paraguay) | Lorenzo Frutos | Deportivo Lara | Undisclosed | |
| 13 August 2019 | MF | (Azerbaijan) | Afran Ismayilov | Sumgayit | Free | |
| Summer 2019 | MF | (Azerbaijan) | Tural Bayramli | Daugavpils | Undisclosed | |
| Summer 2019 | MF | (Azerbaijan) | Rashad Sadygov | | Free | |
| 11 December 2019 | MF | (Uzbekistan) | Shohrux Gadoyev | Bunyodkor | Undisclosed | |
| 17 January 2020 | FW | (Angola) | Alexander Christovão | Al-Mujazzal | Undisclosed | |
| Winter 2020 | MF | (Azerbaijan) | Murad Agayev | Sabail | Undisclosed | |

=== Loans in ===
| Date from | Position | Nationality | Name | From | Date to | Ref. |
|---|---|---|---|---|---|---|
| 22 July 2019 | MF | (Paraguay) | César Meza | Universitatea Craiova | End of Season | |

=== Released ===
| Date | Position | Nationality | Name | Joined | Date |
|---|---|---|---|---|---|
| Summer 2019 | DF | (Azerbaijan) | Sertan Tashkin | Sumgayit | 13 June 2019 |
| Summer 2019 | MF | (Azerbaijan) | Javid Əliyev | | |
| Summer 2019 | MF | (Azerbaijan) | Orxan Fərəcov | | |
| Summer 2019 | FW | (Azerbaijan) | Vagif Javadov | | |
| Summer 2019 | FW | (Azerbaijan) | Nurlan Quliyev | | |
| 19 June 2019 | MF | (Azerbaijan) | Samir Masimov | Olimp Khimki | |
| 24 December 2019 | GK | (Azerbaijan) | Shahin Zakiyev | | |
| 31 December 2019 | MF | (Azerbaijan) | Emin Mehdiyev | | |
| January 2020 | DF | (Azerbaijan) | Murad Gayali | Sabail | 10 January 2020 |
| 22 June 2020 | DF | (Azerbaijan) | Jabir Amirli | Neftçi | 1 July 2020 |
| 22 June 2020 | DF | (Azerbaijan) | Slavik Alkhasov | Sabah | 25 June 2020 |
| 29 June 2020 | DF | (Argentina) | Franco Flores | Doxa Drama | 31 October 2020 |
| 29 June 2020 | MF | (Azerbaijan) | Murad Agayev | | |
| 29 June 2020 | MF | (Azerbaijan) | Tural Bayramli | Zira | 19 July 2020 |
| 29 June 2020 | MF | (Azerbaijan) | Afran Ismayilov | Sabail | 3 September 2020 |
| 29 June 2020 | FW | (Azerbaijan) | Ruslan Gurbanov | Zira | 19 July 2020 |
| 29 June 2020 | FW | (Paraguay) | Lorenzo Frutos | | |
| 30 June 2020 | MF | (Azerbaijan) | Zija Azizov | Den Bosch | |

== Friendlies ==
| 5 July 2019 | Sumgayit | 2 – 1 | Keşla | Sumqayit |
| AZST (UTC+4) | Yunanov 19'; B.Bakhshaliyev 83' | Report | Gurbanov 15' (pen.) | Stadium: Kapital Bank Arena |

| 18 July 2019 | Zira | 2 – 2 | Keşla | Zirə |
| 18:00 AZST (UTC+4) | N.Suleymanov 39'; Norde 83' | Report | S.Alkhasov 6'; E.Mehdiyev 21' | Stadium: Zira Olympic Sport Complex Stadium |

| 31 July 2019 | Osmanlıspor (Turkey) | – | (Azerbaijan) Keşla | Gerede, Turkey |
| AZST (UTC+4) | | | | Stadium: Bolu Koru Hotels Spa & Convention |

| 2 August 2019 | – | (Azerbaijan) Keşla | Gerede, Turkey |
| AZST (UTC+4) | | | Stadium: Bolu Koru Hotels Spa & Convention |

| 4 August 2019 | – | (Azerbaijan) Keşla | Gerede, Turkey |
| AZST (UTC+4) | | | Stadium: Bolu Koru Hotels Spa & Convention |

| 10 January 2020 | Keşla | 3 – 0 | Qaradağ Lökbatan | Baku |
| AZST (UTC+4) | Isgandarli; Gurbanov; Amirjanov | Report |

| 17 January 2020 | Keşla (Azerbaijan) | 1 – 4 | (Germany) FSV Zwickau | Antalya, Turkey |
| AZT (UTC+4) | Gadoyev | Report | Goal |

| 22 January 2020 | Keşla (Azerbaijan) | 1 – 2 | (Russia) Arsenal Tula | Antalya, Turkey |
| 18:00 AZT (UTC+4) | Christovão 70' | Report | K.Kangwa 74'; Minayev 81' |

| 24 January 2020 | Keşla (Azerbaijan) | 1 – 1 | (Slovakia) Zemplín Michalovce | Antalya, Turkey |
| 13:00 AZT (UTC+4) | Christovão | Report | Goal |

| 9 June 2020 | Neftçi | 3 – 1 | Keşla | Baku |
| 18:00 AZT (UTC+4) | Mahmudov 10' (pen.), 12'; Hajiyev 90+2' | Report | Christovão 65' | Stadium: Eighth Kilometer District Stadium |

== Competitions ==
=== Azerbaijan Premier League ===
==== Results summary ====
| Overall | | | | | | | | Home | | | | | | Away | | | | | |
| Pld | W | D | L | GF | GA | GD | Pts | W | D | L | GF | GA | GD | W | D | L | GF | GA | GD |
|---|---|---|---|---|---|---|---|---|---|---|---|---|---|---|---|---|---|---|---|
| 20 | 8 | 6 | 6 | 25 | 19 | +6 | 30 | 5 | 1 | 4 | 14 | 10 | +4 | 3 | 5 | 2 | 11 | 9 | +2 |

Last updated: 8 March 2020.
Source: See Results

==== Results by round ====
| Round | 1 | 2 | 3 | 4 | 5 | 6 | 7 | 8 | 9 | 10 | 11 | 12 | 13 | 14 | 15 | 16 | 17 | 18 | 19 | 20 |
|---|---|---|---|---|---|---|---|---|---|---|---|---|---|---|---|---|---|---|---|---|
| Ground | H | A | A | H | A | H | A | H | H | A | H | A | H | A | A | H | A | H | A | H |
| Result | L | W | W | L | D | W | D | D | W | D | W | L | W | D | W | L | L | W | D | L |
| Position | 6 | 3 | 2 | 4 | 3 | 3 | 2 | 3 | 3 | 3 | 2 | 3 | 2 | 3 | 2 | 3 | 3 | 3 | 3 | 3 |

Updated to match(es) played on 8 March 2020. Source: See Results
A = Away; H = Home; W = Win; D = Draw; L = Loss

==== Results ====
| 16 August 2019 1 | Keşla | 0 – 1 | Qarabağ | Baku |
| 19:00 AZT (UTC+4) | Gurbanov (yellow card) 53'; E.Mehdiyev (yellow card) 71' (yellow-red card) 74'; Qirtimov (yellow card) 90+2' | Report | Mammadov (yellow card) 44'; I.Ibrahimli 79' | Stadium: Dalga Arena; Attendance: 800; Referee: Orkhan Mammadov |

| 25 August 2019 2 | Sabah | 0 – 1 | Keşla | Masazır |
| 18:45 AZT (UTC+4) | U.Diallo (yellow card) 18'; A.Aghazade (yellow card) 61' | Report | Isgandarli 45+1'; Meza (yellow card) 55' (yellow-red card) 74'; Qirtimov (yellow card) 75'; Gurbanov (yellow card) 90'; Namașco (yellow card) 90+4' | Stadium: Alinja Arena; Attendance: 1,500; Referee: Sabuhi Bayramov |

| 31 August 2019 3 | Gabala | 0 – 4 | Keşla | Qabala |
| 18:30 AZT (UTC+4) | A.Seydiyev (yellow card) 63' | Report | S.Alkhasov 10'; Isgandarli (yellow card) 31'; T.Bayramli 39'; Frutos 45+1', 90+1'; Flores (yellow card) 53' | Stadium: Gabala City Stadium; Attendance: 150; Referee: Aliyar Ağayev |

| 15 September 2019 4 | Keşla | 1 – 2 | Sabail | Baku |
| 18:00 AZT (UTC+4) | A.Salahli (yellow card) 30'; Flores (yellow card) 30'; Frutos 54'; Bojović (yellow card) 64'; Isgandarli (yellow card) 71' | Report | Mira.Abbasov 18', 30' (pen.); Rahimov (yellow card) 22'; Yunuszade (yellow card) 64'; Cociuc (yellow card) 85'; F.Muradbayli (yellow card) 86' | Stadium: Bakcell Arena; Attendance: 400; Referee: Elcin Məsiyev |

| 22 September 2019 5 | Neftçi | 0 – 0 | Keşla | Baku |
| 18:30 AZT (UTC+4) | Guerrier (yellow card) 19' (yellow-red card) 35'; M.Kane (yellow card) 83'; Mahmudov (yellow card) 88' | Report | Meza (yellow card) 14'; S.Alkhasov (yellow card) 41'; Kamara (yellow card) 66'; Flores (yellow card) 82' | Stadium: Bakcell Arena; Attendance: 1,000; Referee: Ingilab Məmmədov |

| 29 September 2019 6 | Keşla | 2 – 0 | Zira | Baku |
| 19:45 AZT (UTC+4) | Gurbanov 51'; Isgandarli (yellow card) 53'; Frutos 62'; J.Amirli (yellow card) 84' | Report | B.Hasanalizade (yellow card) 31'; Huseynov (yellow card) 35' | Stadium: Bayil Arena; Attendance: 500; Referee: Aliyar Ağayev |

| 5 October 2019 7 | Sumgayit | 0 – 0 | Keşla | Sumqayit |
| 17:00 AZT (UTC+4) | E.Jafarguliyev (yellow card) 37'; E.Badalov (yellow card) 51'; S.Abdullazade (yellow card) 82'; S.Aliyev (yellow card) 90+3' | Report | Gurbanov (yellow card) 6'; Qirtimov (yellow card) 65' | Stadium: Kapital Bank Arena; Attendance: 1,000; Referee: Sabuhi Bayramov |

| 19 October 2019 8 | Keşla | 1 – 1 | Sabah | Baku |
| 19:15 AZT (UTC+4) | Isgandarli 16' | Report | Mirzabeyov (yellow card) 42'; Khalilzade (yellow card) 71' (yellow-red card) 90+5'; Ivanović (yellow card) 85' (yellow-red card) 90+3'; Ekstein 90+2' | Stadium: Bayil Arena; Attendance: 500; Referee: Kamal Umudlu |
Note: Match played at the Bayil Arena in Baku, instead of Keşla's regular ASK Arena in Baku.

| 26 October 2019 9 | Keşla | 2 – 1 | Gabala | Baku |
| 16:00 AZT (UTC+4) | Frutos 1'; Meza 42' (yellow card) 45' | Report | R.Huseynov (yellow card) 30'; Volkovi 58'; M.Musayev (yellow card) 90+5' | Stadium: Bayil Arena; Attendance: 500; Referee: Rauf Jabbarov |
Note: Match played at the Bayil Arena in Baku, instead of Keşla's regular ASK Arena in Baku.

| 2 November 2019 10 | Sabail | 0 – 0 | Keşla | Baku |
| 16:00 AZT (UTC+4) | E.Rəhimli (yellow card) 1'; F.Muradbayli (yellow card) 18'; Mira.Abbasov (yellow card) 84' | Report | Qirtimov (yellow card) 24'; Meza (yellow card) 61' | Stadium: Bayil Arena; Attendance: 150; Referee: Ravan Həmzəzadə |

| 9 November 2019 11 | Keşla | 2 – 1 | Neftçi | Baku |
| 17:00 AZT (UTC+4) | T.Bayramli (yellow card) 44'; S.Alkhasov (yellow card) 45+1'; Flores 63'; Meza 82'; E.Mehdiyev (yellow card) 90+1' | Report | M.Kane (yellow card) 25'; Akhundov (yellow card) 32'; Dabo (yellow card) 44'; Guerrier 45'; Mahmudov (yellow card) 87' | Stadium: Bayil Arena; Attendance: 1,500; Referee: Vuqar Hasanli |
Note: Match played at the Bayil Arena in Baku, instead of Keşla's regular ASK Arena in Baku.

| 24 November 2019 12 | Zira | 3 – 1 | Keşla | Zirə |
| 15:00 AZT (UTC+4) | N.Suleymanov (yellow card) 4'; Rodríguez 6' (pen.), 11'; Huseynov 35'; Jamalov (yellow card) 58'; Gadze (yellow card) 83' | Report | Flores (yellow card) 20'; Gurbanov 45+4'; Meza (yellow card) 58' (yellow-red card) 60' | Stadium: Zira Olympic Sport Complex Stadium; Attendance: 600; Referee: Orkhan Məmmədov |

| 30 November 2019 13 | Keşla | 2 – 1 | Sumgayit | Baku |
| 15:00 AZT (UTC+4) | Bojović 16'; T.Bayramli (yellow card) 42'; Kamara (yellow card) 46'; Frutos 54'; Ismayilov (yellow card) 86' | Report | Isayev (yellow card) 11'; Jannatov (yellow card) 43'; Agayev 66' (yellow card) 87'; S.Ahmadov (yellow card) 83'; S.Aliyev (yellow card) 85' | Stadium: Bayil Arena; Attendance: 1,000; Referee: Elcin Məsiyev |
Note: Match played at the Bayil Arena in Baku, instead of Keşla's regular ASK Arena in Baku.

| 6 December 2019 14 | Qarabağ | 2 – 2 | Keşla | Baku |
| 19:00 AZT (UTC+4) | Quintana 4'; Ailton (yellow card) 38'; Emreli 45' | Report | J.Amirli (yellow card) 37'; H.Hajili 41' (o.g.); Namașco (yellow card) 45'; T.Bayramli 47'; Qirtimov (yellow card) 64' | Stadium: Tofiq Bahramov Republican Stadium; Attendance: 500; Referee: Kamal Umudlu |
Note: Qarabağ played their home matches at Tofiq Bahramov Republican Stadium, Baku, instead of their regular home stadium Azersun Arena, Baku.

| 2 February 2020 15 | Gabala | 1 – 2 | Keşla | Qabala |
| 15:00 AZT (UTC+4) | Žunić 60'} S.Guliyev (yellow card) 63'; Gérard (yellow card) 90+3'; U.Isgandarov (yellow card) 90+5' | Report | Bojović 35'; Meza 40' (yellow card) 88'; Kamara (yellow card) 57'; Frutos (yellow card) 67'; T.Bayramli (yellow card) 90+4'; Gadoyev (yellow card) 90+7' | Stadium: Gabala City Stadium; Attendance: 200; Referee: Sabuhi Bayramov |

| 7 February 2020 16 | Keşla | 0 – 1 | Sabail | Baku |
| 21:00 AZT (UTC+4) | Kamara (yellow card) 25'; Qirtimov (yellow card) 50' | Report | Ekstein 51' (pen.); Rybka (yellow card) 90+5' | Stadium: ASK Arena; Attendance: 650; Referee: Aliyar Ağayev |

| 16 February 2020 17 | Neftçi | 3 – 1 | Keşla | Baku |
| 19:00 AZT (UTC+4) | Dabo 11' (yellow card) 40'; Mbodj 18' (yellow card) 53'; Akhundov (yellow card) 30'; Mammadov (yellow card) 54'; Joseph-Monrose 59'; M.Kane (yellow card) 89' | Report | Meza 53' (pen.); S.Alkhasov (yellow card) 62' | Stadium: Bakcell Arena; Attendance: 1,800; Referee: Elcin Məsiyev |

| 22 February 2020 18 | Keşla | 4 – 0 | Zira | Baku |
| 17:00 AZT (UTC+4) | Meza (yellow card) 8'; Kamara (yellow card) 17'; Gadoyev 19', 71' (yellow card) 54'; Isgandarli 45'; P.Azadov 90' | Report | Jamalov (yellow card) 3' | Stadium: ASK Arena; Attendance: 550; Referee: Rauf Jabbarov |

| 29 February 2020 19 | Sumgayit | 2 – 2 | Keşla | Sumqayit |
| 16:00 AZT (UTC+4) | Babaei 4'; S.Aliyev (yellow card) 54'; Sadykhov 59'; Mustafayev (yellow card) 69'; Gurbanov (yellow card) 90+1'; Khodzhaniyazov (yellow card) 90+5' | Report | Isgandarli 10'; Meza (yellow card) 28'; Flores (yellow card) 70'; S.Alkhasov 81' (yellow card) 90+6' | Stadium: Kapital Bank Arena; Attendance: 1,200; Referee: Kamal Umudlu |

| 8 March 2020 20 | Keşla | 0 – 2 | Qarabağ | Baku |
| 18:00 AZT (UTC+4) | P.Azadov (yellow card) 58'; Christovão (yellow card) 60'; Gadoyev (yellow card) 80'; Isgandarli (yellow card) 87'; Qirtimov (yellow card) 90+3' | Report | Zoubir 31' (yellow card) 90+3'; Ozobić 87'; B.Huseynov (yellow card) 90+1'; Gueye (yellow card) 90+3' | Stadium: ASK Arena; Attendance: 2,000; Referee: Aliyar Ağayev |

| 13 March 2020 21 | Sabah | – | Keşla | Masazır |
| AZT (UTC+4) | | | | Stadium: Alinja Arena |
Note: Match postponed on 13 March due to the COVID-19 pandemic.

| 20 March 2020 22 | Sabail | – | Keşla | Baku |
| AZT (UTC+4) | | | | Stadium: Bayil Arena |
Note: Match postponed on 13 March due to the COVID-19 pandemic.

==== League table ====
| Pos | Team | Pld | W | D | L | GF | GA | GD | Pts | Qualification or relegation |
|---|---|---|---|---|---|---|---|---|---|---|
| 1 | Qarabağ (C) | 20 | 13 | 6 | 1 | 34 | 7 | +27 | 45 | Qualification for the Champions League first qualifying round |
| 2 | Neftçi Baku | 20 | 10 | 7 | 3 | 33 | 14 | +19 | 37 | Qualification for the Europa League first qualifying round |
| 3 | Keşla | 20 | 8 | 6 | 6 | 27 | 21 | +6 | 30 | Qualification for the Europa League first qualifying round |
| 4 | Sumgayit | 20 | 6 | 5 | 9 | 24 | 32 | −8 | 23 | Qualification for the Europa League first qualifying round |
| 5 | Zira | 20 | 6 | 5 | 9 | 25 | 37 | −12 | 23 | |

Source: Soccerway
Rules for classification: 1) Points; 2) Head-to-head points; 3) Head-to-head goal difference; 4) Head-to-head goals scored; 5) Head-to-head away goals scored (only if two teams); 6) Goal difference; 7) Goals scored.
(C) Champions

=== Azerbaijan Cup ===
| 3 December 2019 First Round | Keşla | 3 – 1 | Kapaz | Baku |
| 15:00 AZT (UTC+4) | Flores (yellow card) 21' (yellow-red card) 45+2'; Amirjanov 25'; Guliyev (yellow card) 49'; Meza (yellow card) 66'; X.Mahmudov 56', 87' | Report | E.Nəsibov (yellow card) 10'; Mammadov 45+3' | Stadium: ASK Arena; Attendance: 100; Referee: Rauf Allahverdiyev |

| 16 December 2019 Quarterfinal 1st leg | Qarabağ | 1 – 0 | Keşla | Baku |
| 20:00 AZT (UTC+4) | I.Ibrahimli 53' (yellow card) 77' | Report | Sadygov (yellow card) 82' | Stadium: Tofiq Bahramov Republican Stadium; Attendance: 500; Referee: Sabuhi Bayramov |
Note: Qarabağ played their home match at Tofiq Bahramov Republican Stadium, Baku, instead of their regular stadium Azersun Arena, Baku.

| 20 December 2019 Quarterfinal 2nd leg | Keşla | 1 – 3 (1 – 4 agg.) | Qarabağ | Baku |
| 20:00 AZT (UTC+4) | T.Bayramli (yellow card) 25'; Isgandarli (yellow card) 45+2'; X.Mahmudov (yellow card) 59' (goal) 67' | Report | Medvedev (yellow card) 19'; Emreli 20'; Romero 40'; Ailton (yellow card) 78'; T.Bayramov 90+2' | Stadium: Bayil Arena; Attendance: 1,000; Referee: Rauf Jabbarov |
Note: Match played at the Bayil Arena in Baku, instead of Keşla's regular ASK Arena in Baku.

== Squad statistics ==
As of match played 8 March 2020

=== Appearances and goals ===
| No. | Pos | Nat | Player | Total | | Premier League | | Azerbaijan Cup | |
| No. | Pos | Nat | Player | Apps | Goals | Apps | Goals | Apps | Goals |
|---|---|---|---|---|---|---|---|---|---|
| 1 | GK | (Moldova) MDA | Stanislav Namașco | 22 | 0 | 20 | 0 | 2 | 0 |
| 2 | DF | (Azerbaijan) AZE | Ilkin Qirtimov | 16 | 0 | 15+1 | 0 | 0 | 0 |
| 3 | DF | (Azerbaijan) AZE | Jabir Amirli | 21 | 0 | 7+11 | 0 | 2+1 | 0 |
| 4 | DF | (Azerbaijan) AZE | Slavik Alkhasov | 21 | 2 | 19 | 2 | 2 | 0 |
| 5 | DF | (Argentina) ARG | Franco Flores | 20 | 1 | 17+1 | 1 | 2 | 0 |
| 6 | MF | (Azerbaijan) AZE | Rashad Sadygov | 7 | 0 | 0+6 | 0 | 1 | 0 |
| 7 | MF | (Azerbaijan) AZE | Tural Bayramli | 21 | 2 | 19 | 2 | 2 | 0 |
| 9 | FW | (Paraguay) PAR | Lorenzo Frutos | 17 | 6 | 15+2 | 6 | 0 | 0 |
| 10 | MF | (Paraguay) PAR | César Meza | 19 | 4 | 16 | 4 | 3 | 0 |
| 11 | FW | (Azerbaijan) AZE | Ruslan Gurbanov | 17 | 2 | 14+2 | 2 | 1 | 0 |
| 13 | MF | (Azerbaijan) AZE | Parviz Azadov | 6 | 1 | 1+3 | 1 | 2 | 0 |
| 14 | MF | (Azerbaijan) AZE | Emin Mehdiyev | 10 | 0 | 0+7 | 0 | 1+2 | 0 |
| 17 | MF | (Azerbaijan) AZE | Vusal Isgandarli | 23 | 4 | 20 | 4 | 2+1 | 0 |
| 18 | DF | (Azerbaijan) AZE | Ruslan Amirjanov | 1 | 1 | 0 | 0 | 1 | 1 |
| 19 | DF | (Azerbaijan) AZE | Azer Salahli | 7 | 0 | 3+2 | 0 | 2 | 0 |
| 21 | DF | (Montenegro) MNE | Mijuško Bojović | 19 | 2 | 19 | 2 | 0 | 0 |
| 22 | MF | (Azerbaijan) AZE | Afran Ismayilov | 18 | 0 | 3+12 | 0 | 1+2 | 0 |
| 25 | MF | (Sierra Leone) SLE | John Kamara | 20 | 0 | 18 | 0 | 1+1 | 0 |
| 30 | MF | (Uzbekistan) UZB | Shohrux Gadoyev | 6 | 2 | 4+2 | 2 | 0 | 0 |
| 33 | DF | (Azerbaijan) AZE | Tarlan Guliyev | 10 | 0 | 5+2 | 0 | 3 | 0 |
| 42 | FW | (Angola) ANG | Alexander Christovão | 6 | 0 | 4+2 | 0 | 0 | 0 |
| 90 | MF | (Azerbaijan) AZE | Orxan Faracov | 4 | 0 | 0+1 | 0 | 1+2 | 0 |
| 94 | GK | (Azerbaijan) AZE | Rashad Azizli | 1 | 0 | 0 | 0 | 1 | 0 |
| 97 | FW | (Azerbaijan) AZE | Xazar Mahmudov | 4 | 3 | 1 | 0 | 3 | 3 |
Players away from Keşla on loan:
Players who left Keşla during the season:

=== Goal scorers ===
| Place | Position | Nation | Number | Name | Premier League | Azerbaijan Cup | Total |
|---|---|---|---|---|---|---|---|
| 1 | FW | (Paraguay) | 9 | Lorenzo Frutos | 6 | 0 | 6 |
| 2 | MF | (Paraguay) | 10 | César Meza | 4 | 0 | 4 |
| 2 | MF | (Azerbaijan) | 17 | Vusal Isgandarli | 4 | 0 | 4 |
| 4 | FW | (Azerbaijan) | 97 | Xazar Mahmudov | 0 | 3 | 3 |
| 5 | FW | (Azerbaijan) | 11 | Ruslan Gurbanov | 2 | 0 | 2 |
| 5 | MF | (Azerbaijan) | 7 | Tural Bayramli | 2 | 0 | 2 |
| 5 | DF | (Montenegro) | 21 | Mijuško Bojović | 2 | 0 | 2 |
| 5 | MF | (Uzbekistan) | 30 | Shohrux Gadoyev | 2 | 0 | 2 |
| 5 | DF | (Azerbaijan) | 4 | Slavik Alkhasov | 2 | 0 | 2 |
| 10 | DF | (Argentina) | 5 | Franco Flores | 1 | 0 | 1 |
| 10 | MF | (Azerbaijan) | 13 | Parviz Azadov | 1 | 0 | 1 |
| 10 | DF | (Azerbaijan) | 18 | Ruslan Amirjanov | 0 | 1 | 1 |
| 10 | | | | Own goal | 0 | 1 | 1 |
| | | | | TOTALS | 27 | 4 | 31 |

=== Clean sheets ===
| Place | Position | Nation | Number | Name | Premier League | Azerbaijan Cup | Total |
|---|---|---|---|---|---|---|---|
| 1 | GK | (Moldova) | 1 | Stanislav Namașco | 7 | 0 | 7 |
| | | | | TOTALS | 7 | 0 | 7 |

=== Disciplinary record ===
| Number | Nation | Position | Name | Premier League | | Azerbaijan Cup | | Total | |
| Number | Nation | Position | Name | Yellow card | Red card | Yellow card | Red card | Yellow card | Red card |
| 1 | (Moldova) | GK | Stanislav Namașco | 2 | 0 | 0 | 0 | 2 | 0 |
| 2 | (Azerbaijan) | DF | Ilkin Qirtimov | 7 | 0 | 0 | 0 | 7 | 0 |
| 3 | (Azerbaijan) | DF | Jabir Amirli | 2 | 0 | 0 | 0 | 2 | 0 |
| 4 | (Azerbaijan) | DF | Slavik Alkhasov | 4 | 0 | 0 | 0 | 4 | 0 |
| 5 | (Argentina) | DF | Franco Flores | 5 | 0 | 2 | 1 | 7 | 1 |
| 6 | (Azerbaijan) | MF | Rashad Sadygov | 0 | 0 | 1 | 0 | 1 | 0 |
| 7 | (Azerbaijan) | MF | Tural Bayramli | 3 | 0 | 1 | 0 | 4 | 0 |
| 9 | (Paraguay) | FW | Lorenzo Frutos | 1 | 0 | 0 | 0 | 1 | 0 |
| 10 | (Paraguay) | MF | César Meza | 10 | 2 | 1 | 0 | 11 | 2 |
| 11 | (Azerbaijan) | FW | Ruslan Gurbanov | 3 | 0 | 0 | 0 | 3 | 0 |
| 13 | (Azerbaijan) | MF | Parviz Azadov | 1 | 0 | 0 | 0 | 1 | 0 |
| 14 | (Azerbaijan) | MF | Emin Mehdiyev | 3 | 1 | 0 | 0 | 3 | 1 |
| 17 | (Azerbaijan) | MF | Vusal Isgandarli | 4 | 0 | 1 | 0 | 5 | 0 |
| 19 | (Azerbaijan) | DF | Azer Salahli | 1 | 0 | 0 | 0 | 1 | 0 |
| 21 | (Montenegro) | DF | Mijuško Bojović | 1 | 0 | 0 | 0 | 1 | 0 |
| 22 | (Azerbaijan) | MF | Afran Ismayilov | 1 | 0 | 0 | 0 | 1 | 0 |
| 25 | (Sierra Leone) | MF | John Kamara | 5 | 0 | 0 | 0 | 5 | 0 |
| 30 | (Uzbekistan) | MF | Shohrux Gadoyev | 3 | 0 | 0 | 0 | 3 | 0 |
| 33 | (Azerbaijan) | DF | Tarlan Guliyev | 0 | 0 | 1 | 0 | 1 | 0 |
| 42 | (Angola) | FW | Alexander Christovão | 1 | 0 | 0 | 0 | 1 | 0 |
| 97 | (Azerbaijan) | FW | Xazar Mahmudov | 0 | 0 | 1 | 0 | 1 | 0 |
Players who left Keşla during the season:
| | | | TOTALS | 57 | 3 | 8 | 1 | 65 | 4 |
