= Azizov =

Azizov is a surname. Notable people with the surname include:

- Abdusalom Azizov (born 1960), Uzbek military leader
- Elchin Azizov (born 1975), Azerbaijani operatic baritone
- Emin Azizov (born 1984), Azerbaijani wrestler
- Faig Azizov (born 1966), Azerbaijani footballer
- Magomed Azizov (born 1969), Russian wrestler
- Mehman Azizov (born 1976), Azerbaijani judoka
- Minneula Azizov (born 1951), Russian field hockey player
- Ramin Azizov (born 1988), Azerbaijani taekwondo practitioner
- Zija Azizov (born 1998), Azerbaijani footballer
