= Araruna =

Araruna is the name of several municipalities of Brazil:

- Araruna, Paraíba
- Araruna, Paraná
