= Vagner (footballer, born 1986) =

Brazilian footballer

Personal information
- Full name: Vagner da Silva
- Date of birth: 6 June 1986 (age 40)
- Place of birth: Araruna, Brazil
- Height: 1.85 m (6 ft 1 in)
- Position: Goalkeeper

Team information
- Current team: Operário Ferroviário
- Number: 33

Youth career
- 1998–1999: CFZ-RJ
- 2000: Portuguesa Londrinense
- 2000–2007: Athletico Paranaense

Senior career*
Years	Team	Apps	(Gls)
2007–2009	Athletico Paranaense	0	(0)
2009	→ Ituano (loan)		
2009–2011	Desportivo Brasil		
2010–2011	→ Estoril (loan)	8	(0)
2011–2015	Estoril	95	(0)
2015–2018	Mouscron	36	(0)
2017–2018	→ Boavista (loan)	48	(0)
2018–2020	Qarabağ	15	(0)
2021–2022	Nacional	16	(0)
2022–2024	Torreense	66	(0)
2025–	Operário Ferroviário	44	(0)
- * Club domestic league appearances and goals as of 18 November 2026

Vagner da Silva (born 6 June 1986), known as Vagner, is a Brazilian professional footballer who plays as a goalkeeper for Operário Ferroviário.

== Club career ==
Born in Araruna, Paraná, Vagner finished his formation with Club Athletico Paranaense after joining the club's youth system as a 15-year-old. He went on to be part of several Série A rosters with the main squad, but never appeared in any matches in the competition during his tenure.

Released in 2009, Vagner subsequently represented lowly Ituano Futebol Clube and Desportivo Brasil. In January 2010, owned by the latter, he was loaned to Portuguese side G.D. Estoril Praia, helping with 28 appearances in his second full season to help his team return to the Primeira Liga after seven years.

Vagner was again an undisputed starter from 2012 to 2014 under manager Marco Silva, as the Canaries consecutively qualified to the UEFA Europa League. In the summer of 2015, the free agent moved the Belgian First Division A with Royal Excel Mouscron.

On 3 January 2017, Vagner returned to Portugal and its top division, being loaned to Boavista F.C. until the end of the season. For the following campaign, the move was extended.

On 6 July 2018, Vagner signed a two-year contract with Qarabağ FK. On 22 June 2020, having played no Azerbaijan Premier League games during the season for the champions, he left.

== Career statistics ==
As of match played 11 November 2026

Appearances and goals by club, season and competition
Club	Season	League			State league		National cup		League cup		Continental		Total	
Club	Season	Division	Apps	Goals	Apps	Goals	Apps	Goals	Apps	Goals	Apps	Goals	Apps	Goals
Athletico Paranaense	2007	Série A	0	0	0	0	0	0	—		0	0	18	0
Desportivo Brasil	2009	Paulista	—		0	0	—		—		—		51	0
Estoril (loan)	2009–10	Liga de Honra	1	0	—		—		0	0	—		1	0
Estoril (loan)	2010–11	Liga de Honra	7	0	—		0	0	3	0	—		10	0
Estoril (loan)	Total		8	0	—		0	0	3	0	—		11	0
Estoril	2011–12	Liga de Honra	28	0	—		3	0	3	0	—		34	0
Estoril	2012–13	Primeira Liga	28	0	—		1	0	1	0	—		30	0
Estoril	2013–14	Primeira Liga	29	0	—		1	0	1	0	10	0	41	0
Estoril	2014–15	Primeira Liga	10	0	—		0	0	2	0	3	0	15	0
Estoril	Total		95	0	—		5	0	7	0	13	0	120	0
Mouscron	2015–16	Belgian Pro League	29	0	—		1	0	—		—		30	0
Mouscron	2016–17	Belgian First Division A	7	0	—		0	0	—		—		7	0
Mouscron	Total		36	0	—		1	0	—		—		37	0
Boavista (loan)	2016–17	Primeira Liga	14	0	—		—		—		—		14	0
Boavista (loan)	2017–18	Primeira Liga	34	0	—		1	0	1	0	—		36	0
Boavista (loan)	Total		48	0	—		1	0	1	0	—		50	0
Qarabağ	2018–19	Azerbaijan Premier League	15	0	—		1	0	—		10	0	26	0
Qarabağ	2019–20	Azerbaijan Premier League	0	0	—		0	0	—		8	0	8	0
Qarabağ	Total		15	0	—		1	0	—		18	0	34	0
Nacional	2021–22	Liga Portugal 2	16	0	—		0	0	1	0	—		17	0
Torreense	2022–23	Liga Portugal 2	32	0	—		0	0	2	0	—		34	0
Torreense	2023–24	Liga Portugal 2	31	0	—		0	0	1	0	—		32	0
Torreense	Total		63	0	—		0	0	3	0	—		66	0
Operário Ferroviário	2025	Série B	4	0	—		0	0	—		—		4	0
Operário Ferroviário	2026	Série B	30	0	9	0	5	0	—		—		44	0
Operário Ferroviário	Total		34	0	9	0	5	0	—		—		48	0
Career total			315	0	9	0	13	0	14	0	31	0	382	0

== Honours ==
Athletico Paranaense

- Campeonato Paranaense: 2005

Estoril

- Segunda Liga: 2011–12

Qarabağ

- Azerbaijan Premier League: 2018–19

Individual

- LPFP Segunda Liga Goalkeeper of the Year: 2011–12
