= Faycal Rherras =

Belgian-born Moroccan footballer

Personal information
- Date of birth: 7 April 1993 (age 33)
- Place of birth: Liège, Belgium
- Height: 1.83 m (6 ft 0 in)
- Position: Full-back

Youth career
- –2001: J.S. Pierreuse
- 2002–2005: FC Liège
- 2005–2010: Standard Liège
- 2010: Club Brugge
- 2010–2012: Standard Liège
- 2012–2013: Beerschot

Senior career*
Years	Team	Apps	(Gls)
2013–2014	CS Visé	31	(7)
2014–2016	Sint-Truiden	47	(1)
2016–2017	Heart of Midlothian	19	(1)
2017–2018	KV Mechelen	9	(0)
2018	→ Hibernian (loan)	1	(0)
2018–2019	Béziers	23	(2)
2019–2020	Qarabağ	6	(0)
2020–2021	Mouloudia Oujda	4	(0)
2021	Levski Sofia	7	(0)
2022–2023	URSL Visé	11	(1)

International career
2016	Morocco U23	1	(0)
2016	Morocco	1	(0)
- * Club domestic league appearances and goals as of 19:51, 27 January 2024 (UTC)

Faycal Rherras (born 7 April 1993) is a professional footballer who plays full-back. Born in Belgium, he represented Morocco at international level.

== Club career ==
Rherras signed for Heart of Midlothian in June 2016. He scored his first goal for the club in a 3–3 draw with Inverness Caledonian Thistle on 29 October 2016. Rherras was released by Hearts during May 2017, then signed for KV Mechelen. He returned to Scottish football in January 2018, signing on loan for Hibernian.

On 15 July 2019, Rherras signed a two-year contract with Qarabağ FK. On 22 June 2020, Qarabağ announced that Rherras had left the club.

After a spell in Morocco, Rherras signed for 1.5 years with Levski Sofia in Bulgaria.

== International career ==
He played for the Morocco national football team in a friendly match with Albania in August 2016, which ended in a goalless draw.

== Career statistics ==
As of match played 17 May 2019

Appearances and goals by club, season and competition
Club	Season	League			League Cup		National Cup		Europe		Other		Total	
Club	Season	Division	Apps	Goals	Apps	Goals	Apps	Goals	Apps	Goals	Apps	Goals	Apps	Goals
Vise	2013–14	Belgian Second Division	31	7	0	0	2	0	0	0	0	0	29	7
Sint-Truiden	2014–15	Belgian Second Division	19	1	0	0	2	0	0	0	0	0	21	1
Sint-Truiden	2015–16	Belgian Pro League	28	0	0	0	1	0	0	0	0	0	29	0
Sint-Truiden	Total		47	1	0	0	3	0	0	0	0	0	50	7
Heart of Midlothian	2016–17	Scottish Premiership	19	1	0	0	0	0	4	0	0	0	23	1
KV Mechelen	2017–18	Belgian Division 1	9	0	0	0	1	0	0	0	0	0	10	0
Hibernian (loan)	2017–18	Scottish Premiership	1	0	0	0	0	0	0	0	0	0	1	0
Béziers	2018–19	Ligue 2	23	2	0	0	1	0	0	0	0	0	24	2
Qarabağ	2019–20	Azerbaijan Premier League	6	0	2	0	-		1	1	-		9	1
Career total			136	11	2	0	7	0	5	1	0	0	150	12

== Honours ==
=== Club ===
Qarabağ

- Azerbaijan Premier League (1): 2019–20
