= 2019–20 Azerbaijan Premier League =

Azerbaijan Premier League
- Season: 2019–20
- Dates: 16 August 2019 – 10 May 2020
- Champions: Qarabağ
- Relegated: None
- Champions League: Qarabağ
- Europa League: Neftçi; Keşla; Sumgayit
- Matches: 65
- Goals: 161 (2.48 per match)
- Top goalscorer: Four Players (7 goals)
- Biggest home win: Neftçi Baku 4–1 Gabala (24 November 2019); Zira 4–1 Sabail (8 December 2019)
- Biggest away win: Zira 0–6 Qarabağ (15 February 2020)
- Highest scoring: Zira 0–6 Qarabağ (15 February 2020)
- Longest winning run: Qarabağ (7 games)
- Longest unbeaten run: Qarabağ (11 games)
- All statistics correct as of 15 February 2020.

The 2019–20 Azerbaijan Premier League was the 28th season of the Azerbaijan Premier League with Qarabağ being the defending champions. The season began on 16 August 2019, and prematurely ended on 19 June 2020.

== Season events ==
On 13 March 2020, the Azerbaijan Premier League was postponed due to the COVID-19 pandemic.

On 19 June 2020, the AFFA announced that the 2019–20 edition of the Azerbaijan Premier League had officially ended without the resumption of the remaining matches due to the escalating situation of the COVID-19 pandemic in Azerbaijan. As a result, Qarabağ were crowned champions for the seventh season in a row, whilst also qualifying for the 2020–21 UEFA Champions League, with Neftçi, Keşla and Sumgayit qualifying for the 2020–21 UEFA Europa League.

== Teams ==
Locations of the 2019–20 Azerbaijan Premier League teams.
Team in italics is from a zone of the Nagorno-Karabakh conflict and is playing its home games in Baku.

=== Stadia and locations ===
Note: Table lists in alphabetical order.

Team	Year Established	Location	Venue	Capacity
Gabala	1995	Qabala	Gabala City Stadium	4,500
Keşla	1997	Keshla	ASK Arena	5,300
Neftçi Baku	1937	Baku	Bakcell Arena	10,500
Qarabağ	1987	Baku	Azersun Arena	5,800
Sabah	2017	Masazır	Bank Respublika Arena	13,000
Sabail	2016	Sabail	ASCO Arena	3,200
Sumgayit	2010	Sumqayit	Kapital Bank Arena	1,400
Zira	2014	Zira	Zira Olympic Sport Complex Stadium	1,300

=== Stadiums ===
Gabala	Keşla	Qarabağ	Neftçi Baku
Gabala City Stadium	ASK Arena	Azersun Arena	Bakcell Arena
Capacity: **4,500**	Capacity: **5,300**	Capacity: **5,800**	Capacity: **11,000**
Sabah	Sabail	Sumgayit	Zira
Bank Respublika Arena	ASCO Arena	Kapital Bank Arena	Zira Olympic Sport Complex Stadium
Capacity: **13,000**	Capacity: **3,200**	Capacity: **1,400**	Capacity: **1,300**

=== Personnel and kits ===
Note: Flags indicate national team as has been defined under FIFA eligibility rules. Players may hold more than one non-FIFA nationality.

Team	Manager	Team captain	Kit manufacturer	Shirt sponsor
Gabala	(Azerbaijan) Elmar Bakhshiyev	(Azerbaijan) Asif Mammadov	Joma	Milla
Keşla	(Azerbaijan) Tarlan Ahmadov	(Azerbaijan) Slavik Alkhasov	Joma	Samaya LTD
Neftçi Baku	(Azerbaijan) Fizuli Mammedov	(Azerbaijan) Emin Mahmudov	Nike	Turkish Airlines
Qarabağ	(Azerbaijan) Gurban Gurbanov	(Azerbaijan) Rashad Sadygov	Adidas	Azersun
Sabah	(Croatia) Željko Sopić	(Azerbaijan) Javid Imamverdiyev	Macron	Bank Respublika
Sabail	(Azerbaijan) Aftandil Hacıyev	(Azerbaijan) Rahid Amirguliyev	Nike	AzTea
Sumgayit	(Azerbaijan) Aykhan Abbasov	(Azerbaijan) Vurğun Hüseynov	Jako	Pasha Insurance, Azərikimya
Zira	(Azerbaijan) Zaur Hashimov	(Azerbaijan) Javid Huseynov	Joma	Bakcell, Azfargroup

=== Foreign players ===
A team could use only six foreign players on the field in each game.

Club	Player 1	Player 2	Player 3	Player 4	Player 5	Player 6	Player 7	Player 8	Player 9	Player 10
Gabala	(Croatia) Ivica Žunić	(Georgia (country)) **Merab Gigauri**	(Ivory Coast) Christian Kouakou	(Mozambique) **Clésio**	(Spain) Fernán Ferreiroa	(France) Abdelrafik Gérard	(Slovenia) Nicolas Rajsel			
Keşla	(Argentina) Franco Flores	(Moldova) **Stanislav Namașco**	(Montenegro) Mijuško Bojović	(Paraguay) César Meza	(Paraguay) Lorenzo Frutos	(Sierra Leone) **John Kamara**	(Uzbekistan) **Shohrux Gadoyev**	(Angola) **Alexander Christovão**		
Neftçi Baku	(Brazil) Dário	(France) Bagaliy Dabo	(France) Steeven Joseph-Monrose	(Greece) **Vangelis Platellas**	(Guinea) Mamadou Kane	(Haiti) **Soni Mustivar**	(Senegal) Mamadou Mbodj	(Serbia) **Vojislav Stanković**	(Iran) Saman Nariman Jahan	
Qarabağ	(Brazil) Ailton	(Brazil) Vagner	(Croatia) **Filip Ozobić**	(France) Abdellah Zoubir	(Morocco) **Faycal Rherras**	(Senegal) Magaye Gueye	(Spain) Míchel	(Ghana) **Owusu Kwabena**		
Sabah	(Republic of the Congo) **Kévin Koubemba**	(Guinea) Amadou Diallo	(Serbia) Filip Ivanović	(Serbia) Saša Stamenković	(Ukraine) Dmytro Bezruk	(Mali) Ulysse Diallo	(Croatia) Mario Marina	(Ukraine) **Marko Dević**	(Paraguay) Julio Rodríguez	(Moldova) **Eugeniu Cociuc**
Sabail	(Brazil) Erico	(Ghana) **Michael Essien**	(Ukraine) **Oleksandr Rybka**	(South Africa) **Hendrick Ekstein**	(Iran) Peyman Keshavarzi Nazarloo					
Sumgayit	(Israel) Amir Agayev	(Iran) Peyman Babaei	(Iran) Mehdi Sharifi	(Russia) Dzhamaldin Khodzhaniyazov						
Zira	(Botswana) **Mpho Kgaswane**	(France) Chafik Tigroudja	(Ghana) Richard Gadze	(Montenegro) **Miloš Bakrač**	(Montenegro) Bojan Zogović	(Peru) **Álvaro Ampuero**	(Romania) Adrian Scarlatache	(Sierra Leone) **Alie Sesay**	(Georgia (country)) Davit Volkovi	(Moldova) **Gheorghe Anton**

In bold: Players that capped for their national team.

=== Managerial changes ===
Team	Outgoing manager	Manner of departure	Date of vacancy	Position in table	Incoming manager	Date of appointment
Gabala	(Azerbaijan) Sanan Gurbanov	Resigned	31 August 2019	8th	(Azerbaijan) Elmar Bakhshiyev (interim)	2 September 2019
Sabah	(Azerbaijan) Elshad Ahmadov	Resigned	16 September 2019	7th	(Azerbaijan) Igor Ponomaryov (interim)	19 September 2019
Zira	(Azerbaijan) Samir Abbasov	Resigned	8 October 2019	6th	(Azerbaijan) Zaur Hashimov	9 October 2019
Sabah	(Azerbaijan) Igor Ponomaryov (interim)	End of interim role	26 November 2019	6th	(Croatia) Željko Sopić	26 November 2019
Neftçi	(Italy) Roberto Bordin	Resigned	18 January 2020	3rd	(Azerbaijan) Fizuli Mammedov	18 January 2020

== League table ==
Pos	Team	Pld	W	D	L	GF	GA	GD	Pts	Qualification or relegation
1	Qarabağ (C)	20	13	6	1	34	7	+27	45	Qualification for the Champions League first qualifying round
2	Neftçi Baku	20	10	7	3	33	14	+19	37	Qualification for the Europa League first qualifying round
3	Keşla	20	8	6	6	27	21	+6	30	Qualification for the Europa League first qualifying round
4	Sumgayit	20	6	5	9	24	32	−8	23	Qualification for the Europa League first qualifying round
5	Zira	20	6	5	9	25	37	−12	23	
6	Sabah	20	5	6	9	19	27	−8	21	
7	Sabail	20	5	5	10	16	30	−14	20	
8	Gabala	20	5	4	11	25	35	−10	19	

Source: Soccerway
Rules for classification: 1) Points; 2) Head-to-head points; 3) Head-to-head goal difference; 4) Head-to-head goals scored; 5) Head-to-head away goals scored (only if two teams); 6) Goal difference; 7) Goals scored.
(C) Champions

== Results ==
Clubs will play each other four times for a total of 28 matches each.

=== Matches 1–14 ===
Home \ Away	GAB	KES	NEF	QAR	SAB	SEB	SUM	ZIR
Gabala		0–4	0–3	1–1	1–2	3–0	0–2	3–0
Keşla	2–1		2–1	0–1	1–1	1–2	2–1	2–0
Neftçi Baku	4–1	0–0		0–0	1–1	2–1	2–1	3–0
Qarabağ	3–0	2–2	2–0		2–0	1–0	2–0	1–1
Sabah	0–1	0–1	0–2	0–1		3–0	1–3	2–2
Sabail	1–1	0–0	0–0	0–4	1–3		0–2	1–0
Sumgayit	1–1	0–0	2–4	2–1	1–0	0–3		1–2
Zira	1–1	3–1	1–0	1–3	1–1	4–1	2–2	

Source: soccerway.com
Legend: Blue = home team win; Yellow = draw; Red = away team win.

=== Matches 15–28 ===
Home \ Away	GAB	KES	NEF	QAR	SAB	SEB	SUM	ZIR
Gabala		1–2	0–2				5–0	
Keşla				0–2		0–1		4–0
Neftçi Baku		3–1			4–0	1–1	1–1	
Qarabağ			0–0		0–0		1–0	
Sabah	3–2					0–0		
Sabail	3–1			0–1				1–3
Sumgayit		2–2			1–2			2–1
Zira	1–2			0–6	2–0			

Source: soccerway.com
Legend: Blue = home team win; Yellow = draw; Red = away team win.

== Season statistics ==
=== Top scorers ===
As of matches played 9 March 2020

Rank	Player	Club	Goals
1	(Iran) Peyman Babaei	Sumgayit	7
1	(France) Steeven Joseph-Monrose	Neftçi Baku	7
1	(France) Bagaliy Dabo	Neftçi Baku	7
1	(Azerbaijan) Mahir Emreli	Qarabağ	7
5	(Paraguay) Lorenzo Frutos	Keşla	6
5	(Azerbaijan) Aghabala Ramazanov	Zira	6
5	(Georgia (country)) Davit Volkovi	Zira	6
8	(Iran) Mehdi Sharifi	Sumgayit	5
8	(Senegal) Magaye Gueye	Qarabağ	5
8	(South Africa) Hendrick Ekstein	Sabail	5
8	(France) Abdellah Zoubir	Qarabağ	5

=== Clean sheets ===
As of match played 9 March 2020

Rank	Player	Club	Clean sheets
1	(Azerbaijan) Shahruddin Mahammadaliyev	Qarabağ	9
2	(Azerbaijan) Salahat Aghayev	Neftçi	7
2	(Moldova) Stanislav Namașco	Keşla	7
4	(Bosnia and Herzegovina) Asmir Begović	Qarabağ	6
5	(Azerbaijan) Mehdi Jannatov	Sumgayit	4
5	(Azerbaijan) Anar Nazirov	Gabala	4

=== Scoring ===
- First goal of the season: Ismayil Ibrahimli for Qarabağ against Keşla on 16 August 2019.

== See also ==
- Azerbaijan Premier League
- Azerbaijan First Division
