= Vusal Isgandarli =

Azerbaijani footballer (born 1995)

Personal information
- Full name: Vusal Mahmud oglu Isgandarli
- Date of birth: 3 November 1995 (age 31)
- Place of birth: Fuzuli, Azerbaijan
- Height: 1.80 m (5 ft 11 in)
- Position: Winger

Team information
- Current team: Malisheva
- Number: 17

Youth career
- Ravan Baku

Senior career*
Years	Team	Apps	(Gls)
2013–2014	Ravan Baku	0	(0)
2014–2015	Simurq	1	(0)
2015–2019	Zira	60	(6)
2019–2021	Keşla	59	(7)
2021–2022	Keçiörengücü	23	(4)
2022–2023	Sumgayit	34	(6)
2023–2024	Egnatia	37	(5)
2024–2025	Boluspor	38	(1)
2025–2026	Partizani	31	(6)
2026–	Malisheva	8	(4)

International career^{‡}
2019–	Azerbaijan	11	(1)
- * Club domestic league appearances and goals as of 13 October 2026 ‡ National team caps and goals as of 4 October 2026

Vusal Mahmud oglu Isgandarli (Azerbaijani: Vüsal Mahmud oğlu İsgəndərli; born 3 November 1995) is an Azerbaijani professional footballer who plays as a midfielder for Malisheva in the Football Superleague of Kosovo.

== Career ==
=== Club ===
On 8 January 2019, Isgandarli signed for Keşla FK from Zira FK.

After playing in Turkey for Keçiörengücü and Boluspor, in Azerbadjan again for Sumgayit and in Albania for Egnatia and Partizani, he joined Football Superleague of Kosovo club Malisheva on 30 June 2026.

=== International ===
Isgandarli made his international debut for Azerbaijan on 19 November 2019 in a UEFA Euro 2020 qualifying match against Slovakia. He scored his first international goal on 27 March 2026 in the FIFA Series 6–1 win against Saint Lucia.

== Career statistics ==
=== Club ===
As of match played 8 March 2020

Appearances and goals by club, season and competition
Club	Season	League			National Cup		Continental		Other		Total	
Club	Season	Division	Apps	Goals	Apps	Goals	Apps	Goals	Apps	Goals	Apps	Goals
Ravan Baku	2013–14	Azerbaijan Premier League	0	0	0	0	–		–		0	0
Simurq	2014–15	Azerbaijan Premier League	1	0	0	0	–		–		1	0
Zira	2015–16	Azerbaijan Premier League	10	0	2	0	–		–		12	0
Zira	2016–17	Azerbaijan Premier League	15	0	2	0	–		–		17	0
Zira	2017–18	Azerbaijan Premier League	24	5	3	2	0	0	–		27	7
Zira	2018–19	Azerbaijan Premier League	11	1	2	0	–		–		13	1
Zira	Total		60	6	9	2	0	0	-	-	69	8
Keşla	2018–19	Azerbaijan Premier League	13	0	0	0	–		–		13	0
Keşla	2019–20	Azerbaijan Premier League	20	4	3	0	–		–		23	4
Keşla	Total		31	4	3	0	-	-	-	-	36	4
Career total			94	10	12	2	0	0	-	-	106	12

=== International ===
As of 4 October 2026

Azerbaijan
Year	Apps	Goals
2019	1	0
2020	2	0
2024	2	0
2026	6	1
Total	11	1

Scores and results list Azerbaijan goal tally first, score column indicates score after each Isgandarli goal

List of international goals scored by Vusal Isgandarli
No.	Date	Venue	Opponent	Score	Result	Competition
1	27 March 2026	Sumgayit City Stadium, Sumgait, Azerbaijan	Saint Lucia	5–1	6–1	2026 FIFA Series
