= Lorenzo Frutos =

Paraguayan footballer (born 1989)

Personal information
- Full name: Lorenzo Frutos
- Date of birth: 4 June 1989 (age 37)
- Place of birth: Paraguay
- Height: 1.75 m (5 ft 9 in)
- Position: Forward

Senior career*
Years	Team	Apps	(Gls)
2010–2016	Sol de América	127	(17)
2017	Rubio Ñu	12	(3)
2017–2018	Santa Tecla	26	(10)
2018	Independiente	25	(5)
2019	Deportivo Lara	10	(2)
2019–2020	Keşla	17	(6)
- * Club domestic league appearances and goals as of 19 June 2020

Lorenzo Frutos (born 4 June 1989) is a Paraguayan footballer who last played for Keşla in the Azerbaijan Premier League.

== Club career ==
On 8 August 2019, Keşla FK announced the signing of Frutos on a one-year contract.

== Career statistics ==
=== Club ===
As of match played 8 March 2020

Club statistics
Club	Season	League			Cup		League Cup		Continental		Other		Total	
Club	Season	Division	Apps	Goals	Apps	Goals	Apps	Goals	Apps	Goals	Apps	Goals	Apps	Goals
Rubio Ñu	2017	Paraguayan Primera División	12	3	0	0	-		-		–		12	3
Santa Tecla	2017–18	La Primera	26	10	0	0	-		-		–		26	10
Independiente	2018	Paraguayan Primera División	25	5	0	0	-		-		–		25	5
Deportivo Lara	2019	Liga Venezolana	10	2	0	0	-		6	1	–		16	3
Keşla	2019–20	Azerbaijan Premier League	17	6	0	0	-		-		–		17	6
Career total			90	26	0	0	-	-	6	1	-	-	96	27
