= Abdellah Zoubir =

French footballer (born 1991)

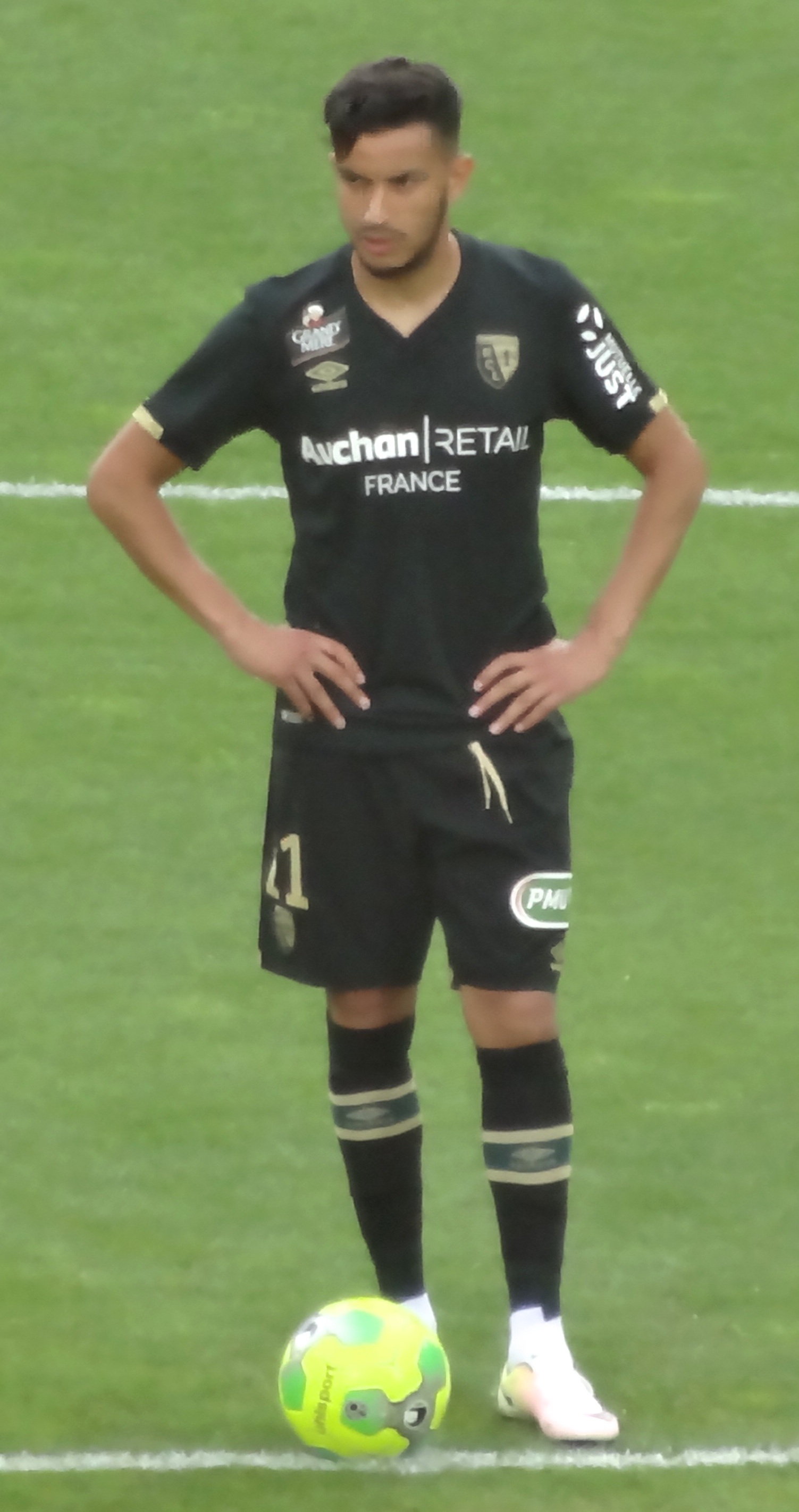
- Zoubir with Lens in 2016

Personal information
- Date of birth: 5 December 1991 (age 34)
- Place of birth: Lille, France
- Height: 1.80 m (5 ft 11 in)
- Positions: Attacking midfielder; winger

Team information
- Current team: Al-Orobah
- Number: 10

Senior career*
Years	Team	Apps	(Gls)
2011–2013	Grenoble	14	(7)
2013–2015	Istres	34	(1)
2013–2014	→ Hibernian (loan)	13	(0)
2015–2016	Petrolul Ploiești	38	(5)
2016–2018	Lens	66	(6)
2018–2026	Qarabağ	217	(55)
2026–	Al-Orobah	1	(0)
- * Club domestic league appearances and goals as of 14 September 2025

Abdellah Zoubir (born 5 December 1991) is a French professional footballer that plays as an attacking midfielder or winger for Saudi First Division League club Al-Orobah.

Zoubir started out his senior career at Grenoble, after which he went on to compete professionally in Scotland, Romania and Azerbaijan, respectively. In the latter country, he aided Qarabağ in winning four national titles and one national cup.

== Career ==
=== Early career and Istres ===
Born in Lille of Moroccan descent, Zoubir started playing futsal in his native city at the age of 6. He represented France at youth level in that sport, sharing teams at one point with Wissam Ben Yedder. In 2012, Zoubir signed for Istres in Ligue 2. He was loaned in January 2013 to lower league club Grenoble.

In August 2013, Zoubir joined Scottish side Hibernian on loan after being recommended by former footballer Frédéric Arpinon. He made his first start for his new team in a Scottish League Cup match against Stranraer on 24 September, also scoring the second goal in a 5–3 win. However, after the departure of manager Pat Fenlon, he did not seem to enter the plans of new coach Terry Butcher, coming on mostly as a substitute.

An ankle injury kept Zoubir out for five months, and he ended the season (which ended in relegation after 15 years) with 16 matches and one goal all competitions comprised. He subsequently returned to Istres, now in the Championnat National.

=== Petrolul Ploiești ===
On 24 June 2015, Zoubir joined Romanian side Petrolul Ploiești on a three-year contract. He made his Liga I debut on 11 July, playing the full 90 minutes in a 0–0 draw at defending champions FC Steaua București; he adapted quickly, being voted Footballer of the Month for July by fans on the DoarPetrolul.ro forum. He netted his first goal for the club on 9 November in a 1–1 home draw against Concordia Chiajna, and his second came against CFR Cluj late in the same month (1–0, also at the Ilie Oană Stadium).

During early December 2015, it was reported that Bucharest rivals Steaua and Dinamo were interested in acquiring Zoubir in the winter transfer window.

=== Qarabağ ===
On 26 June 2018, Zoubir signed a two-year contract with Qarabağ.

On 29 June 2024, Zoubir signed a new three-year contract with Qarabağ.

On 16 August 2026, Qarabağ announced that Zoubir had left the club after 368 appearances and 78 goals, with his contract was terminated by mutual agreement.

=== Al-Orobah ===
On 9 September 2026, Saudi First Division League club Al-Orobah announced the signing of Zoubir.

== Career statistics ==
As of match played on 13 August 2026

Appearances and goals by club, season and competition
Club	Season	League			National cup (Note: Includes Coupe de France, Scottish Cup, Cupa României, Azerbaijan Cup)		League cup (Note: Includes Scottish League Cup, Coupe de la Ligue)		Europe		Total	
Club	Season	Division	Apps	Goals	Apps	Goals	Apps	Goals	Apps	Goals	Apps	Goals
Grenoble	2011–12	Championnat de France amateur 2	0	0	1	0	—		—		1	0
Grenoble	2012–13	Championnat de France Amateur	14	7	0	0	—		—		14	7
Grenoble	Total		14	7	1	0	—		—		15	7
Istres	2012–13	Ligue 2	8	0	0	0	—		—		8	0
Istres	2014–15	Championnat National	26	1	1	0	—		—		27	1
Istres	Total		34	1	1	0	—		—		35	1
Hibernian (loan)	2013–14	Scottish Premiership	13	0	1	0	2	1	—		16	1
Petrolul Ploiești	2015–16	Liga I	38	5	2	0	1	0	—		41	5
Lens	2016–17	Ligue 2	35	4	2	0	0	0	—		37	4
Lens	2017–18	Ligue 2	31	2	3	1	1	0	—		35	3
Lens	Total		66	6	5	1	1	0	—		72	7
Qarabağ	2018–19	Azerbaijan Premier League	23	6	4	0	—		13 (Note: Five appearances in UEFA Champions League, eight appearances and one goal in UEFA Europa League)	1	40	7
Qarabağ	2019–20	Azerbaijan Premier League	19	5	2	0	—		14 (Note: Six appearances in UEFA Champions League, eight appearances and two goals in UEFA Europa League)	2	35	7
Qarabağ	2020–21	Azerbaijan Premier League	26	7	4	0	—		9 (Note: Three appearances in UEFA Champions League, six appearances and two goals in UEFA Europa League)	2	39	9
Qarabağ	2021–22	Azerbaijan Premier League	25	8	4	1	—		14 (Note: Appearances in UEFA Europa Conference League)	3	43	12
Qarabağ	2022–23	Azerbaijan Premier League	32	8	2	0	—		16 (Note: Eight appearances and one goal in UEFA Champions League, six appearances and one goal in UEFA Europa League, two appearances in UEFA Europa Conference League)	2	50	10
Qarabağ	2023–24	Azerbaijan Premier League	32	8	5	3	—		18 (Note: Four appearances and one goal in UEFA Champions League, fourteen appearances and three goals in UEFA Europa League)	4	55	15
Qarabağ	2024–25	Azerbaijan Premier League	30	6	4	1	—		14 (Note: Six appearances in the UEFA Champions League, eight appearances and one goals in UEFA Europa League)	1	48	8
Qarabağ	2025–26	Azerbaijan Premier League	30	7	5	0	—		16 (Note: Appearances in the UEFA Champions League)	2	51	9
Qarabağ	2026–27	Azerbaijan Premier League	0	0	0	0	—		6 (Note: Four appearances and one goal in the UEFA Europa League, two appearances in the UEFA Conference League)	1	6	1
Qarabağ	Total		217	55	31	5	—		120	18	368	78
Career totals			382	74	41	6	4	1	120	18	547	99

== Honours ==
Qarabağ

- Azerbaijan Premier League: 2018–19, 2019–20, 2021–22, 2022–23, 2023–24, 2024–25
- Azerbaijan Cup: 2021–22, 2023–24
