= Stanislav Namașco =

Moldovan footballer (born 1986)

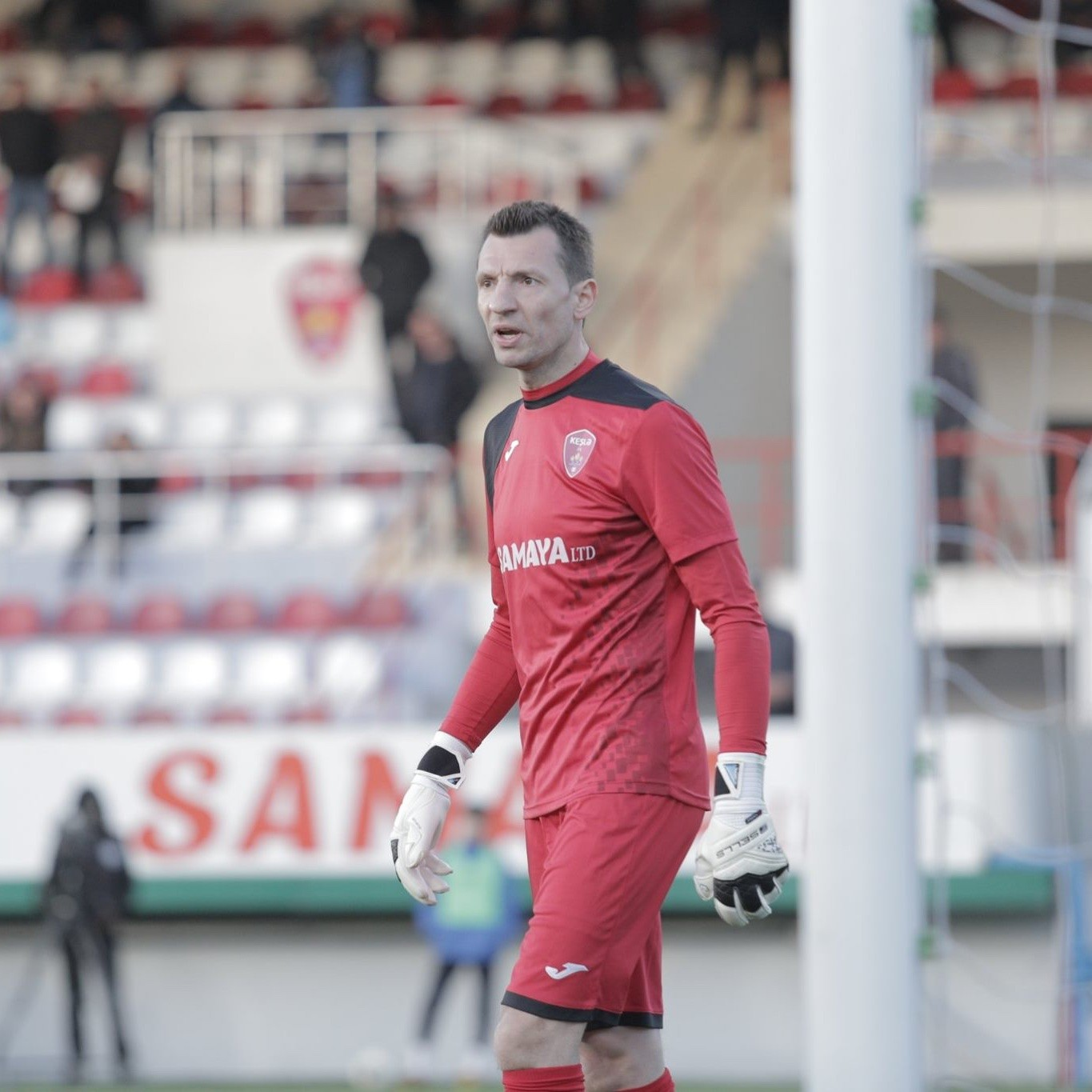
- Namașco with Keşla in 2020

Personal information
- Date of birth: 10 November 1986 (age 40)
- Place of birth: Tiraspol, Moldavian SSR, Soviet Union
- Height: 1.88 m (6 ft 2 in)
- Position: Goalkeeper

Senior career*
Years	Team	Apps	(Gls)
2004–2008	Tiraspol	76	(0)
2008–2010	Sheriff Tiraspol	34	(0)
2010–2013	Kuban Krasnodar	2	(0)
2011	→ Spartak Nalchik (loan)	2	(0)
2013	Volgar Astrakhan	8	(0)
2014	Dinamo-Auto Tiraspol	6	(0)
2014–2016	AZAL	54	(0)
2016–2018	Levadiakos	28	(0)
2018	Dečić	17	(0)
2018–2019	Zeta	36	(0)
2019–2022	Șhamakhi	67	(0)
2022–2024	Bălți	36	(0)

International career
	Moldova U19	1	(0)
2005–2007	Moldova U21	7	(0)
2007–2021	Moldova	57	(0)
- * Club domestic league appearances and goals

Stanislav Namașco (born 10 November 1986) is a Moldovan former professional footballer who played as a goalkeeper. He has made 57 appearances for the Moldova national team.

== Career ==
In the 2007–08 season, he won the Moldovan Championship and the Moldovan Cup. In March 2011, he is credited with an incredible performance in an international match for Moldova away against Sweden after stopping, among many things, a penalty shot from Zlatan Ibrahimović.

In July 2014, Namașco signed a two-year contract with AZAL PFK of the Azerbaijan Premier League.

In July 2016, Namașco signed a two-year contract with Greek club Levadiakos.

Namașco returned to Moldova on 28 July 2022, signing a contract with Moldovan Super Liga club CSF Bălți.

== Career statistics ==
As of 5 April 2021

Club	Season	League			Cup		Continental		Total	
Club	Season	Division	Apps	Goals	Apps	Goals	Apps	Goals	Apps	Goals
FC Tiraspol	2004–05	Moldovan National Division	2	0			0	0	2	0
FC Tiraspol	2005–06	Moldovan National Division	19	0			—		19	0
FC Tiraspol	2006–07	Moldovan National Division	35	0					35	0
FC Tiraspol	2007–08	Moldovan National Division	20	0			—		20	0
FC Tiraspol	Total		76	0			0	0	76	0
Sheriff Tiraspol	2007–08	Moldovan National Division	9	0			—		9	0
Sheriff Tiraspol	2008–09	Moldovan National Division	18	0			4	0	22	0
Sheriff Tiraspol	2009–10	Moldovan National Division	7	0			12	0	19	0
Sheriff Tiraspol	Total		34	0			16	0	50	0
Kuban Krasnodar	2010	Russian National Football League	2	0			—		2	0
Kuban Krasnodar	2011–12	Russian Premier League	0	0	0	0	—		0	0
Kuban Krasnodar	2012–13	Russian Premier League	0	0	0	0	—		0	0
Kuban Krasnodar	Total		2	0	0	0	—		2	0
Spartak Nalchik (loan)	2011–12	Russian Premier League	2	0			—		2	0
Volgar Astrakhan	2012–13	Russian National Football League	8	0			—		8	0
Dinamo-Auto Tiraspol	2013–14	Moldovan National Division	6	0			—		6	0
AZAL	2014–15	Azerbaijan Premier League	18	0	3	0	—		21	0
AZAL	2015–16	Azerbaijan Premier League	36	0	0	0	—		36	0
AZAL	Total		54	0	3	0	—		57	0
Levadiakos	2016–17	Super League Greece	28	0	1	0	—		29	0
Levadiakos	2017–18	Super League Greece	0	0	1	0	—		1	0
Levadiakos	Total		28	0	2	0	—		30	0
Dečić	2017–18	Montenegrin First League	17	0	0	0	—		17	0
Zeta	2018–19	Montenegrin First League	36	0	2	0	—		38	0
Keşla	2019–20	Azerbaijan Premier League	20	0	2	0	—		22	0
Keşla	2020–21	Azerbaijan Premier League	18	0	2	0	1	0	21	0
Keşla	Total		38	0	4	0	1	0	43	0
Career total			301	0	11	0	17	0	329	0
