= Araruna, Paraná =

Coordinates: 23.9319°S 52.4958°W

- Municipality
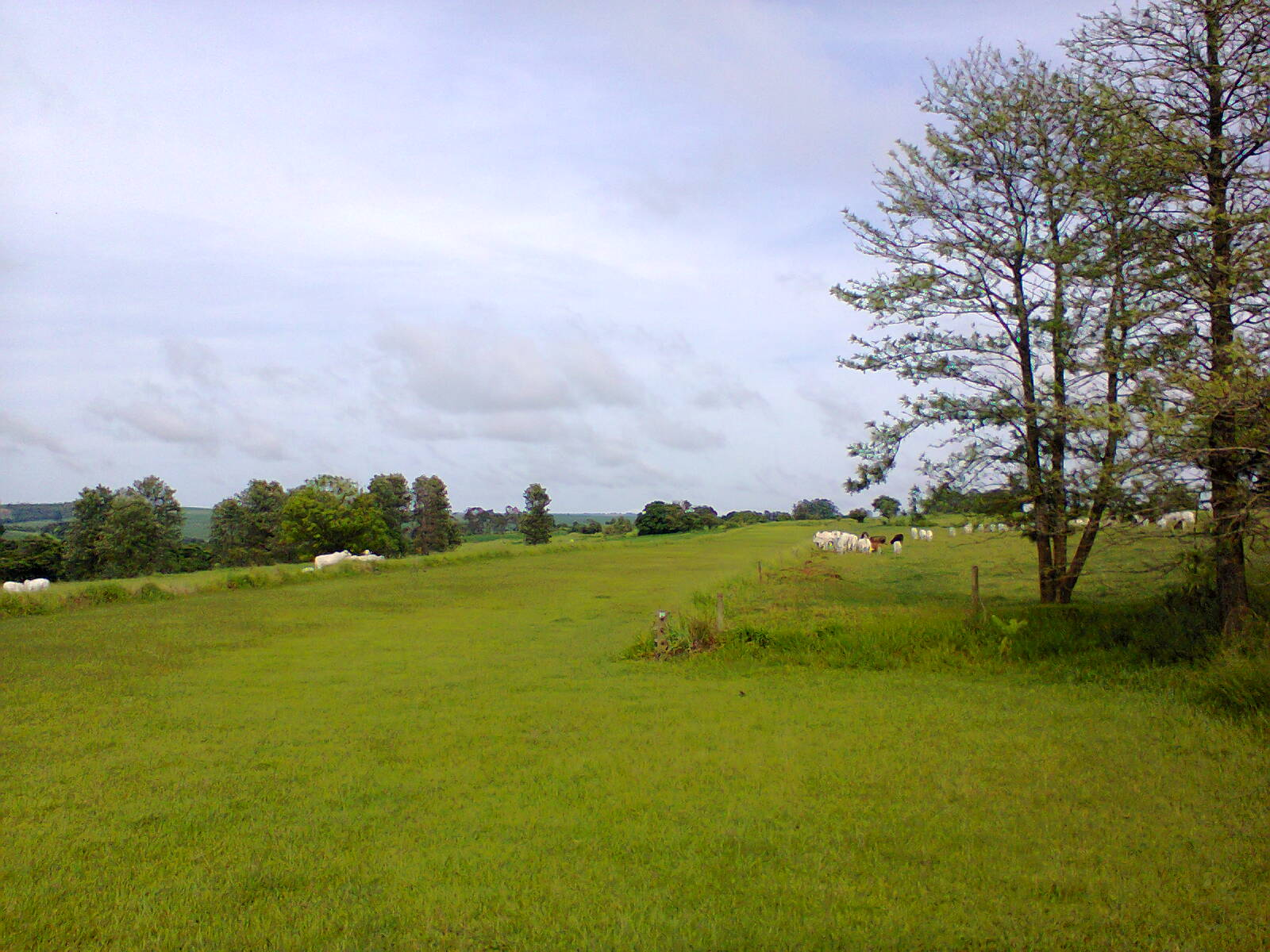

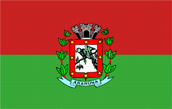
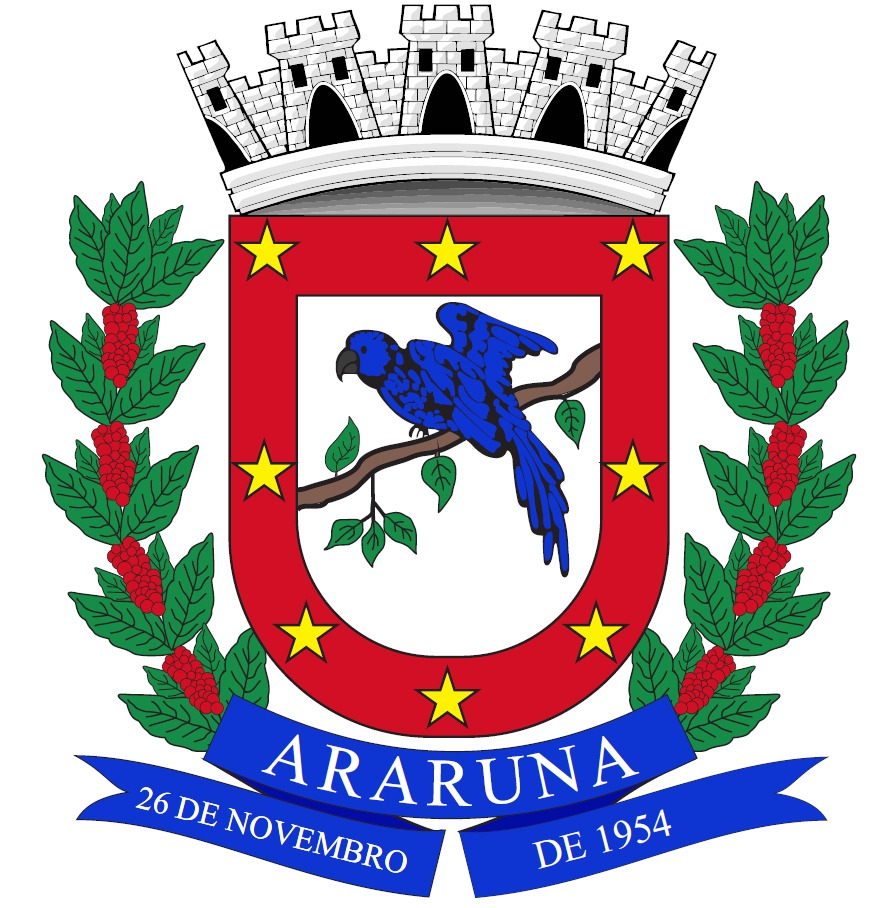
- Flag Coat of arms

- Araruna in Paraná
- Country: Brazil
- Region: Southern
- State: Paraná
- Mesoregion: Sudoeste Paranaense

Population (2020)
  - Total: 14,000
- Time zone: UTC−3 (BRT)

Araruna, Paraná is a municipality in the state of Paraná in the Southern Region of Brazil.

== See also ==
- List of municipalities in Paraná
