= Zija Azizov =

Azerbaijani footballer (born 1998)

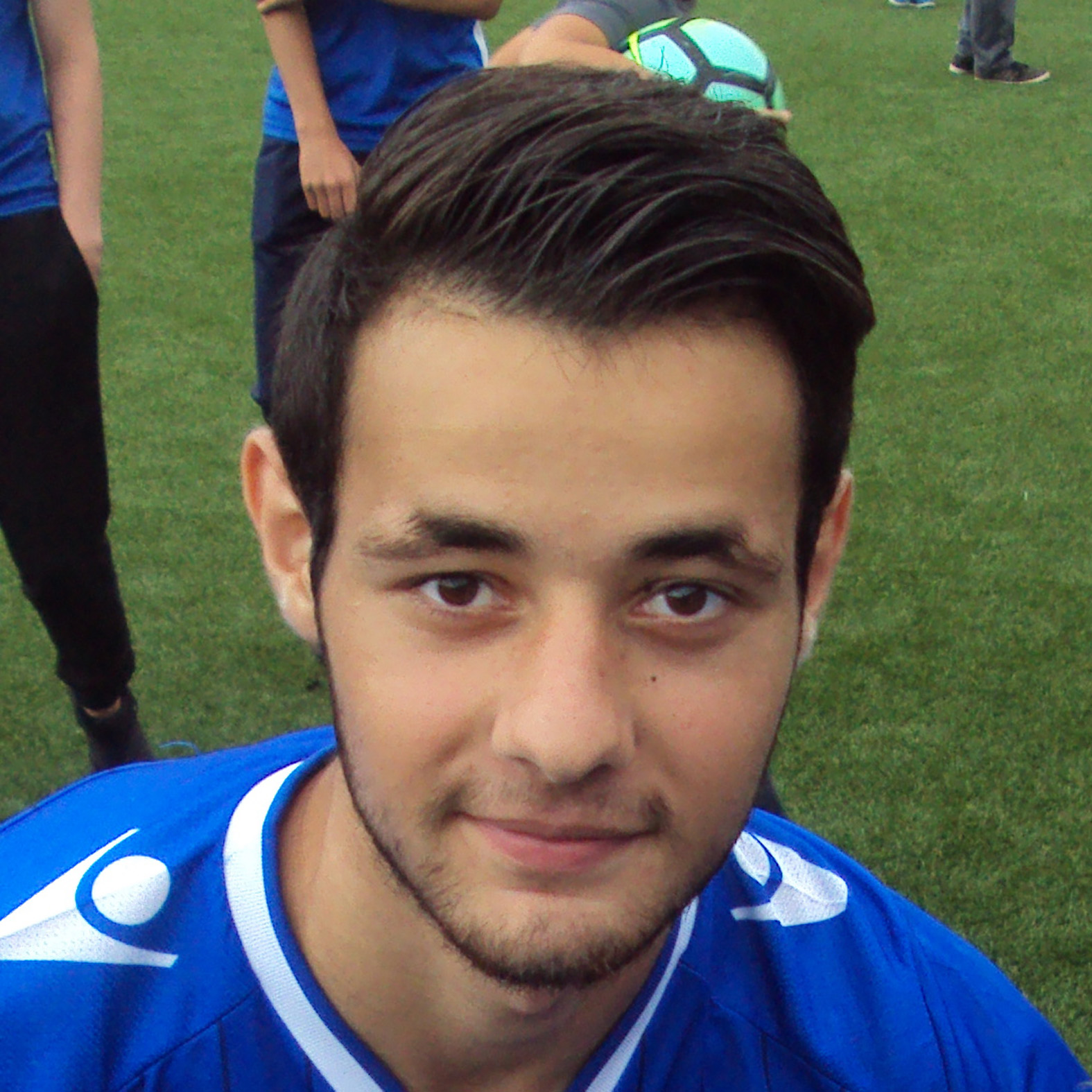

Personal information
- Full name: Ziya Qalib oğlu Əzizov
- Date of birth: 4 October 1998 (age 28)
- Place of birth: Moscow, Russia
- Height: 1.78 m (5 ft 10 in)
- Position: Midfielder

Team information
- Current team: Rosmalen
- Number: 18

Youth career
- –2009: RKSV Taxandria
- 2009–2014: Den Bosch
- 2015–2016: Brabant United

Senior career*
Years	Team	Apps	(Gls)
2016–2018	Den Bosch	46	(4)
2018–2019	Jong NEC	3	(0)
2019–2020	Shamakhi II		
2020–2021	Jong Den Bosch		
2021–2022	VV Trinitas Oisterwijk		
2023–	Rosmalen	10	(0)

International career
2014	Netherlands U17	1	(0)
2016	Azerbaijan U19	2	(0)
2018	Azerbaijan U20	3	(1)
2018–2019	Azerbaijan U21	3	(0)
- * Club domestic league appearances and goals as of 6 October 2024

Zija Azizov (Azerbaijani: Ziya Qalib oğlu Əzizov; born 4 October 1998) is an Azerbaijani footballer who plays as a midfielder for Rosmalen.

== Club career ==
=== Den Bosch ===
On 8 August 2016, Azizov scored and two assist in his professional debut in the Eerste Divisie for FC Den Bosch, a 4–5 defeat at away to Jong PSV. He scored 4 goals in 34 matches during the 2016–17 season.

=== NEC Nijmegen ===
On 30 August 2018, Azizov signed one-year contract with Eerste Divisie side NEC Nijmegen.

=== Keşla ===
On 19 June 2019, Azizov signed one-year contract with Azerbaijan Premier League side Keşla FK.

== Career statistics ==
As of match played 28 April 2018

Club	Season	League			National Cup		Europe		Other		Total	
Club	Season	Division	Apps	Goals	Apps	Goals	Apps	Goals	Apps	Goals	Apps	Goals
FC Den Bosch	2016–17	Eerste Divisie	30	4	0	0	—		—		30	4
FC Den Bosch	2017–18	Eerste Divisie	16	0	1	0	—		—		17	0
FC Den Bosch	Career total		46	4	1	0	—		—		47	4
