= Alexander Christovão =

Angolan footballer

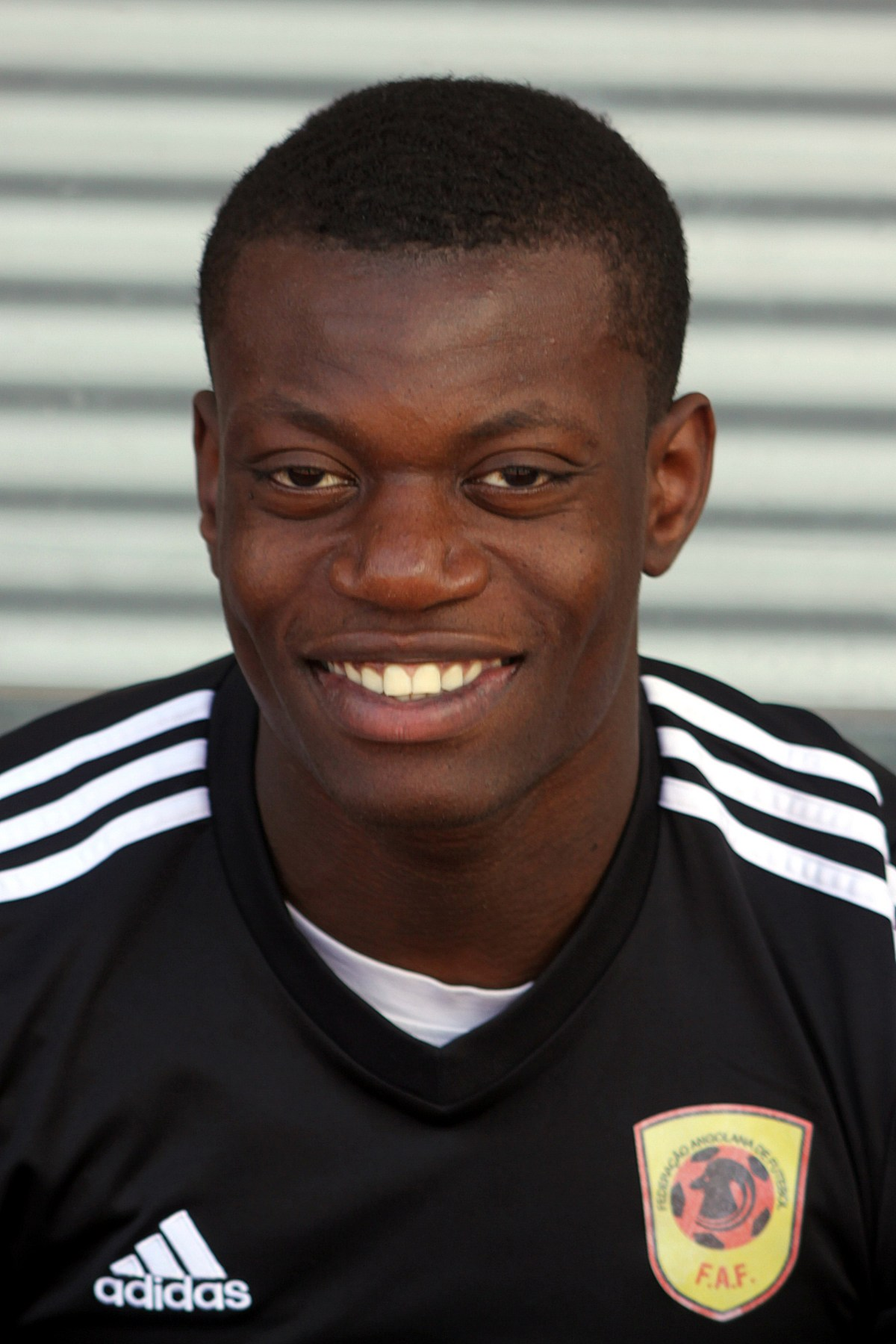
- Christovão in 2014

Personal information
- Full name: Alexandre Domingos Cristóvão M'Futila
- Date of birth: 14 March 1993 (age 33)
- Place of birth: Landana, Angola
- Height: 1.86 m (6 ft 1 in)
- Position: Striker

Youth career
- 2012: FC Groningen

Senior career*
| Years | Team | Apps | (Gls) |
| 2011–2012 | Be Quick 1887 | | |
| 2012–2013 | FC Groningen | 5 | (0) |
| 2013–2014 | SC Cambuur | 8 | (0) |
| 2015 | Recreativo Libolo | 13 | (1) |
| 2016 | Porcelana | 5 | (0) |
| 2016–2017 | Javor Ivanjica | 19 | (2) |
| 2017–2018 | Zagłębie Sosnowiec | 31 | (4) |
| 2019 | Dinamo București | 9 | (0) |
| 2019 | Al-Mujazzal | 12 | (3) |
| 2020–2021 | Keşla | 7 | (0) |

International career^{‡}
| 2014–2016 | Angola | 6 | (2) |
- * Club domestic league appearances and goals as of 24 January 2022 ‡ National team caps and goals as of 3 November 2020

Alexandre Domingos Cristóvão M'Futila, best known as Alexander Christovao (born 14 March 1993) is an Angolan professional footballer who plays as a striker.

== Club career ==
Born in Landana, Cristóvão started playing in the Netherlands with lower-league side Be Quick 1887. Then he played with FC Groningen and SC Cambuur in the Eredivisie between 2012 and 2014.

By then he already had debuted in the Angolan national team so he called the attention of the leading Angolan clubs. Angolan premier league side Recreativo do Libolo brought him for their 2015 campaign which ended-up successfully as Libolo became national champions. At the end of the season he left and signed with Porcelana playing with them in the 2016 Girabola.

On 8 August 2016, he signed a three-year contract with Serbian club Javor Ivanjica. He debuted for Javor in official matches, on 21 September 2016, in a Serbian Cup game against Proleter which Javor won by 1–0. He entered the game as a substitute in 66 minute. In the SuperLiga he debuted on 15 October 2016, in an away game against Metalac. Scoring 2 goals in 21 appearances in both domestic competitions for the club, he left the club in summer 2017.

He then joined in summer 2017 Polish side Zagłębie Sosnowiec helping them achieve promotion to Polish top-flight, and playing following season with them in the 2018–19 Ekstraklasa. His fine performances during the first half of the season, called the attention of other clubs during the winter transfers window, and thus he got brought by the Romanian historical powerhouse Dinamo Bucharest, playing with them the second half of the 2018–19 Liga I season. Dinamo finished the season in a disappointing 9th place, and Alexander Christovão left and signed with Saudi Arabian side Al-Mujazzal.

On 17 January 2020, Christovão signed for Keşla FK until the end of the 2019–20 season.

== International career ==
Cristóvão has been a regular member of the Angola national team since his debut in 2014.

== Career statistics ==
Scores and results list Angola's goal tally first.

| No | Date | Venue | Opponent | Score | Result | Competition |
|---|---|---|---|---|---|---|
| 1. | 28 May 2014 | Estádio Algarve, Algarve, Portugal | Morocco | 2–0 | 2–0 | Friendly |
| 2. | 16 June 2015 | Cape Town Stadium, Cape Town, South Africa | South Africa | 1–0 | 1–2 | Friendly |

== Honours ==
Recreativo Libolo

- Girabola: 2015
