= List of Azerbaijan football transfers winter 2017–18 =

== Azerbaijan Premier League 2017-18 ==
=== Gabala ===
In: Note: Flags indicate national team as defined under FIFA eligibility rules; some limited exceptions apply. Players may hold more than one non-FIFA nationality.

No.	Pos.	Nation	Player
33	MF	AZE	Tamkin Khalilzade (from (Azerbaijan) Zira)
74	DF	AZE	Yusif Nabiyev (loan return from (Azerbaijan) Zira)

Out: Note: Flags indicate national team as defined under FIFA eligibility rules; some limited exceptions apply. Players may hold more than one non-FIFA nationality.

No.	Pos.	Nation	Player
12	MF	SCO	Andy Halliday (loan return to (Scotland) Rangers)
13	GK	AZE	Hasan Huseynov (to (Azerbaijan) Shuvalan)
17	MF	AZE	Roman Huseynov (loan to (Azerbaijan) Kapaz)
21	DF	NED	Dave Bulthuis (to (Netherlands) Heerenveen)
33	MF	AZE	Tural Mammarzayev (to (Azerbaijan) Qaradağ Lökbatan)
44	DF	AZE	Ulvi Ibazade (to (Azerbaijan) Khazar Baku)
70	FW	AZE	Ulvi Iskandarov (loan to (Azerbaijan) Sumgayit)
88	MF	AZE	Tellur Mutallimov (to (Azerbaijan) Zira)
90	FW	NGA	Ekigho Ehiosun
97	MF	AZE	Ravil Yusifli (to (Azerbaijan) Zagatala)
98	FW	AZE	Rovlan Muradov (loan to (Czech Republic) Slavia Prague)
—	FW	UKR	Ramil Hasanov (loan to (Azerbaijan) Khazar Baku, previously on loan to (Azerbaijan) Sumgayit)

=== Kapaz ===
In: Note: Flags indicate national team as defined under FIFA eligibility rules; some limited exceptions apply. Players may hold more than one non-FIFA nationality.

No.	Pos.	Nation	Player
5	DF	AZE	Tural Narimanov (from (Azerbaijan) Shuvalan)
7	MF	AZE	Roman Huseynov (loan from (Azerbaijan) Gabala)
8	MF	AZE	Samir Zargarov (from (Azerbaijan) Keşla)
15	DF	UKR	Ihor Korotetskyi (from (Ukraine) Avanhard)
16	MF	UKR	Giuli Mandzhgaladze (from (Georgia (country)) Samtredia)
19	MF	AZE	Emin Zamanov (from (Azerbaijan) Turan-Tovuz)
20	MF	AZE	Tarzin Jahangirov (from (Azerbaijan) Neftchi Baku)
21	MF	AZE	Murad Sattarli (from (Azerbaijan) Zira)
22	GK	UKR	Serhiy Litovchenko (from (Georgia (country)) Dinamo Tbilisi)
24	FW	TRI	Shahdon Winchester (loan from (Mexico) Murciélagos)
26	DF	AZE	Aykhan Asadov (from (Azerbaijan) Turan-Tovuz)
48	MF	BRA	Diego Souza (Free agent)
55	GK	AZE	Tarlan Gasimzade (from (Azerbaijan) Sabah)
66	DF	AZE	Garakhan Aliyev (from (Azerbaijan) Shuvalan)
91	FW	BRA	Dário (from (South Korea) Seongnam)

Out: Note: Flags indicate national team as defined under FIFA eligibility rules; some limited exceptions apply. Players may hold more than one non-FIFA nationality.

No.	Pos.	Nation	Player
5	DF	AZE	Karim Diniyev (to (Azerbaijan) Sabail)
7	MF	AZE	Sergey Chernyshev (to (Russia) SKA Rostov-on-Don)
8	FW	NGA	Victor Lucky Oseghale
14	MF	AZE	Farid Mammadov (to (Azerbaijan) Qarabağ)
15	DF	AZE	Azad Karimov (to (Azerbaijan) MOIK Baku)
16	MF	AZE	Azer Mammadov
19	FW	AZE	Aydin Gasimov (to (Azerbaijan) Khazar Baku)
20	MF	MLI	Samba Diallo
21	DF	AZE	Novruz Mammadov (to (Azerbaijan) Khazar Baku)
22	GK	AZE	Ruzi Giyasli (to (Azerbaijan) Sabah)
24	FW	AZE	Magomed Kurbanov (to (Azerbaijan) Sabah)
26	MF	SEN	Aladji Mansour Ba

=== Keşla ===
In: Note: Flags indicate national team as defined under FIFA eligibility rules; some limited exceptions apply. Players may hold more than one non-FIFA nationality.

No.	Pos.	Nation	Player
1	GK	AZE	Kamran Aghayev (from (Czech Republic) Mladá Boleslav)
7	FW	AZE	Vagif Javadov (Free agent)
10	MF	PAR	César Meza (Free agent)
14	FW	JAM	Andre Clennon (from (Finland) VPS)
19	MF	ARG	Pablo Podio (loan from (Czech Republic) Fastav Zlín)
21	MF	CMR	Hervé Tchami (from (Saudi Arabia) Hajer)
22	MF	AZE	Magsad Isayev (from (Azerbaijan) Neftchi Baku)
40	MF	SRB	Nemanja Stojanović (loan from (Austria) Karabakh Wien)
90	MF	GAM	Ebrima Sohna (from (Finland) VPS)

Out: Note: Flags indicate national team as defined under FIFA eligibility rules; some limited exceptions apply. Players may hold more than one non-FIFA nationality.

No.	Pos.	Nation	Player
6	MF	AZE	Samir Zargarov (to (Azerbaijan) Kapaz)
7	MF	AZE	Mirsahib Abbasov (loan to (Azerbaijan) Zira)
8	MF	AZE	Nizami Hajiyev
10	MF	AZE	Elnur Abdullayev (to (Azerbaijan) Sumgayit)
19	MF	AZE	Mirhüseyn Seyidov
22	DF	AZE	Ilkin Qirtimov (to (Azerbaijan) Neftchi Baku)
99	DF	AZE	Rijat Garayev (loan to (Azerbaijan) Sabah)

=== Neftchi Baku ===
In: Note: Flags indicate national team as defined under FIFA eligibility rules; some limited exceptions apply. Players may hold more than one non-FIFA nationality.

No.	Pos.	Nation	Player
2	DF	AZE	Ilkin Qirtimov (from (Azerbaijan) Keşla)
3	DF	AZE	Farid Abbasli (from (Azerbaijan) Bine)
9	FW	ARG	Lucas Gómez (from (Venezuela) Deportivo Lara)
12	MF	COL	Mike Campaz (from (Costa Rica) UCR)
19	FW	PAR	Francisco García (from (Paraguay) Cerro Porteño)
51	DF	AZE	Elchin Asadov (loan return from (Azerbaijan) Qarabağ)
93	MF	HAI	Soni Mustivar (from (United States) Sporting Kansas City)

Out: Note: Flags indicate national team as defined under FIFA eligibility rules; some limited exceptions apply. Players may hold more than one non-FIFA nationality.

No.	Pos.	Nation	Player
4	DF	AZE	Rahil Mammadov (to (Azerbaijan) Sabail)
3	DF	CRO	Mateo Mužek (to (Kazakhstan) Shakhter Karagandy)
9	FW	FRA	Hugo Bargas (to (Bolivia) Blooming)
12	FW	ESP	Daniel Segovia (to (India) Bengaluru)
16	DF	CZE	Pavel Dreksa (loan return to (Czech Republic) Karviná)
19	MF	AZE	Fahmin Muradbayli (loan to (Azerbaijan) Sabail)
23	MF	AZE	Tarzin Jahangirov (to (Azerbaijan) Kapaz)
27	DF	AZE	Magsad Isayev (to (Azerbaijan) Keşla)
41	MF	AZE	Agshin Gurbanli (to (Azerbaijan) Sabail)
53	GK	AZE	Maksim Vaylo (loan to (Azerbaijan) Sabah)
61	DF	AZE	Tayyar Mammadov (loan to (Azerbaijan) Sabah, previously on loan to (Azerbaijan) Sabail)
80	MF	VEN	Edson Castillo (released, previously on loan to (Venezuela) Mineros)

=== Qarabağ ===
In: Note: Flags indicate national team as defined under FIFA eligibility rules; some limited exceptions apply. Players may hold more than one non-FIFA nationality.

No.	Pos.	Nation	Player
6	MF	AZE	Farid Mammadov (from (Azerbaijan) Kapaz)
26	MF	AZE	Rufat Abdullazade (from (Azerbaijan) Sumgayit)
28	MF	AZE	Sabuhi Abdullazade (from (Azerbaijan) Sumgayit)

Out: Note: Flags indicate national team as defined under FIFA eligibility rules; some limited exceptions apply. Players may hold more than one non-FIFA nationality.

No.	Pos.	Nation	Player
3	DF	AZE	Turan Manafov (loan return to (Azerbaijan) Sumgayit)
9	FW	RSA	Dino Ndlovu (to (China) Hangzhou Greentown)
16	DF	AZE	Ibrahim Aslanli (to (Azerbaijan) Zira)
18	FW	NOR	Tarik Elyounoussi (loan return to (Greece) Olympiacos)
23	DF	AZE	Elgun Ulukhanov
28	MF	AZE	Suleyman Ahmadov (loan return to (Azerbaijan) Sumgayit)
31	DF	MKD	Oliver Stoimenovski (loan return to (North Macedonia) Rabotnički)
33	MF	AZE	Eltun Turabov (loan to (Azerbaijan) Khazar Baku)
51	DF	AZE	Elchin Asadov (loan return to (Azerbaijan) Neftçi)
59	FW	MKD	Bojan Miovski (loan return to (North Macedonia) Rabotnički)
88	MF	AZE	Elshan Abdullayev (loan to (Azerbaijan) Zira)

=== Sabail ===
In: Note: Flags indicate national team as defined under FIFA eligibility rules; some limited exceptions apply. Players may hold more than one non-FIFA nationality.

No.	Pos.	Nation	Player
4	DF	AZE	Rahil Mammadov (from (Azerbaijan) Neftçi)
5	DF	AZE	Karim Diniyev (from (Azerbaijan) Kapaz)
7	MF	AZE	Fahmin Muradbayli (loan from (Azerbaijan) Neftçi)
13	MF	UGA	Farouk Miya (loan from (Belgium) Standard Liège)
15	DF	GEO	Nika Apakidze (from (Georgia (country)) Rustavi)
18	MF	AZE	Agshin Gurbanli (from (Azerbaijan) Neftçi)
24	DF	AZE	Ruslan Amirjanov (Free agent)
29	MF	MDA	Eugeniu Cociuc (loan from (Slovakia) Žilina)
92	FW	TKM	Wahyt Orazsähedow (from (Turkmenistan) Ahal)

Out: Note: Flags indicate national team as defined under FIFA eligibility rules; some limited exceptions apply. Players may hold more than one non-FIFA nationality.

No.	Pos.	Nation	Player
2	DF	AZE	Sahil Mirzayev (to (Azerbaijan) Sumgayit)
4	MF	AZE	Amit Guluzade (to (Kosovo) Drita)
5	MF	AZE	Seymur Asadov (loan to (Azerbaijan) Sabah)
7	MF	AZE	Emin Mehdiyev (loan to (Azerbaijan) Sabah)
9	FW	AZE	Raul Yagubzade (loan to (Azerbaijan) Sabah)
13	DF	AZE	Murad Musayev (to (Azerbaijan) Shuvalan)
14	DF	AZE	Yamin Agakerimzade (to (Azerbaijan) MOIK Baku)
18	MF	ROU	Alexandru Popovici (to (Romania) Poli Timișoara)
35	DF	LTU	Edgaras Zarskis (to (Poland) Bytovia Bytów)
55	MF	AZE	Tanriverdi Maharramli (loan to (Azerbaijan) Khazar Baku)
77	DF	AZE	Tayyar Mammadov (loan return to (Azerbaijan) Neftçi)

=== Sumgayit ===
In: Note: Flags indicate national team as defined under FIFA eligibility rules; some limited exceptions apply. Players may hold more than one non-FIFA nationality.

No.	Pos.	Nation	Player
16	MF	AZE	Ulvi Suleymanov (from (Azerbaijan) Bine)
17	MF	AZE	Nijat Gurbanov (from (Azerbaijan) Zira)
25	MF	AZE	Suleyman Ahmadov (loan return from (Azerbaijan) Qarabağ)
41	DF	AZE	Turan Manafov (loan return from (Azerbaijan) Qarabağ)
70	FW	AZE	Ulvi Iskandarov (loan from (Azerbaijan) Gabala)
77	MF	AZE	Elnur Abdullayev (from (Azerbaijan) Keşla)
96	DF	AZE	Sahil Mirzayev (from (Azerbaijan) Sabail)

Out: Note: Flags indicate national team as defined under FIFA eligibility rules; some limited exceptions apply. Players may hold more than one non-FIFA nationality.

No.	Pos.	Nation	Player
8	MF	AZE	Nijat Mukhtarov (to (Azerbaijan) Zagatala)
20	MF	AZE	Rufat Abdullazade (to (Azerbaijan) Qarabağ)
28	MF	AZE	Sabuhi Abdullazade (to (Azerbaijan) Qarabağ)
90	FW	UKR	Ramil Hasanov (loan return to (Azerbaijan) Gabala)

=== Zira ===
In: Note: Flags indicate national team as defined under FIFA eligibility rules; some limited exceptions apply. Players may hold more than one non-FIFA nationality.

No.	Pos.	Nation	Player
9	MF	MDA	Alexandru Dedov (from (Moldova) Milsami)
14	MF	AZE	Tellur Mutallimov (from (Azerbaijan) Gabala)
16	DF	AZE	Ibrahim Aslanli (from (Azerbaijan) Qarabağ)
18	DF	MKD	Yani Urdinov (loan from (Czech Republic) Bohemians 1905)
29	MF	TRI	Jomal Williams (loan from (Trinidad and Tobago) W Connection)
77	MF	AZE	Mirsahib Abbasov (loan from (Azerbaijan) Keşla)
88	MF	AZE	Elshan Abdullayev (loan from (Azerbaijan) Qarabağ)

Out: Note: Flags indicate national team as defined under FIFA eligibility rules; some limited exceptions apply. Players may hold more than one non-FIFA nationality.

No.	Pos.	Nation	Player
9	FW	CTA	David Manga (to (Israel) Hapoel Ashkelon)
14	DF	ROU	Gabriel Matei (to (Poland) Termalica)
19	FW	AZE	Elgun Nabiyev (loan to (Azerbaijan) Shuvalan)
21	MF	AZE	Murad Sattarli (to (Azerbaijan) Kapaz)
28	MF	AZE	Tamkin Khalilzade (to (Azerbaijan) Gabala)
74	DF	AZE	Yusif Nabiyev (loan return to (Azerbaijan) Gabala)
99	MF	AZE	Nijat Gurbanov (to (Azerbaijan) Sumgayit)
