= 2017–18 Zira FK season =

Zira
2017-18 season
- President: Vugar Astanov
- Manager: Aykhan Abbasov
- Stadium: Zira Olympic Sport Complex Stadium
- Premier League: 4th
- Azerbaijan Cup: Quarterfinal vs Neftchi Baku
- Europa League: Second qualifying round vs Astra Giurgiu
- Top goalscorer: League: Richard Gadze (7); All: Richard Gadze (9)

The Zira FK 2017-18 season wa Zira's third Azerbaijan Premier League season, and fourth season in their history. It is their first full season with Aykhan Abbasov as manager, during which they finished the season in fourth place, qualifying for the UEFA Europa League for the second year in a row. Zira were also knocked out of the Azerbaijan Cup by Neftchi Baku at the Quarterfinal stage whilst also reaching the Second qualifying round of the Europa League before defeat by Astra Giurgiu.

== Squad ==
As of match played 20 May 2018

No.	Name	Nationality	Position	Date of birth (age)	Signed from	Signed in	Contract ends	Apps.	Goals
Goalkeepers
1	Anar Nazirov	(Azerbaijan)	GK	8 September 1985 (aged 32)	Gabala	2015		74	0
62	Abdulla Seyidahmadov	(Azerbaijan)	GK	5 April 1997 (aged 21)	Ravan Baku	2016		1	0
85	Kamal Bayramov	(Azerbaijan)	GK	19 August 1985 (aged 32)	AZAL	2015		31	0
Defenders
3	Joseph Boum	(Cameroon)	DF	26 September 1989 (aged 28)		2017		21	0
5	Adil Naghiyev	(Azerbaijan)	DF	11 September 1995 (aged 22)	AZAL	2015		91	6
13	Aleksandr Shemonayev	(Azerbaijan)	DF	1 April 1985 (aged 33)	AZAL	2015		57	1
16	Ibrahim Aslanli	(Azerbaijan)	DF	21 March 1997 (aged 21)	Qarabağ	2017	2020	4	0
18	Yani Urdinov	(North Macedonia)	DF	28 March 1991 (aged 27)	loan from Bohemians 1905	2018	2018	12	0
23	Jovan Krneta	(Serbia)	DF	4 May 1992 (aged 26)	Chornomorets Odesa	2015		83	6
39	Sadig Guliyev	(Azerbaijan)	DF	9 March 1995 (aged 23)	Gabala	2017		61	0
57	Kənan Zülfüqarov	(Azerbaijan)	DF	19 April 1999 (aged 19)	Trainee	2017		0	0
	Milad Bayramov	(Azerbaijan)	DF	21 March 1997 (aged 21)	Trainee	2017		1	0
Midfielders
4	Vugar Mustafayev	(Azerbaijan)	MF	5 August 1994 (aged 23)	Qarabağ	2017		76	1
7	Sadio Tounkara	(Mali)	MF	27 April 1992 (aged 26)	AZAL	2017	2019	19	3
8	Milan Đurić	(Serbia)	MF	3 October 1987 (aged 30)	Istra 1961	2016		56	9
9	Alexandru Dedov	(Moldova)	MF	26 July 1989 (aged 28)	Milsami Orhei	2018		11	4
11	Victor Igbekoyi	(Nigeria)	MF	1 September 1986 (aged 31)	AZAL	2015		89	5
14	Tellur Mutallimov	(Azerbaijan)	MF	8 April 1995 (aged 23)	Gabala	2017	2020	11	1
17	Vusal Isgandarli	(Azerbaijan)	MF	3 November 1995 (aged 22)	Simurq	2015		56	7
29	Jomal Williams	(Trinidad and Tobago)	MF	28 April 1994 (aged 24)	loan from W Connection	2018	2018	12	1
38	Ilkin Muradov	(Azerbaijan)	MF	5 March 1996 (aged 22)	Trainee	2015		21	0
47	Əmrah Bayramov	(Azerbaijan)	MF	6 October 1998 (aged 19)	Trainee	2017		0	0
77	Mirsahib Abbasov	(Azerbaijan)	MF	19 January 1993 (aged 25)	loan Keshla	2017	2018	8	0
87	Müşfiq İlyasov	(Azerbaijan)	MF	8 May 1996 (aged 22)	Youth team	2016		6	1
98	Elçin Əliyev	(Azerbaijan)	MF	27 February 1998 (aged 20)	Trainee	2016		0	0
Forwards
10	Orkhan Aliyev	(Azerbaijan)	FW	21 December 1995 (aged 22)	Kapaz	2017		9	1
19	Elgun Nabiyev	(Azerbaijan)	FW	4 January 1996 (aged 22)	Trainee	2015		5	0
20	Jamal Jamalov	(Azerbaijan)	FW	9 October 1998 (aged 19)	Trainee	2017		0	0
43	Richard Gadze	(Ghana)	FW	23 August 1994 (aged 23)	Delhi Dynamos	2017		41	12
88	Elshan Abdullayev	(Azerbaijan)	FW	5 February 1994 (aged 24)	loan from Qarabağ	2018	2018	9	1
Left during the season
9	David Manga	(Central African Republic)	FW	3 February 1989 (aged 29)	Hapoel Ashkelon	2017		20	2
10	Kervens Belfort	(Haiti)	FW	16 May 1992 (aged 26)	Syrianska	2017		6	1
14	Gabriel Matei	(Romania)	DF	26 February 1990 (aged 28)	Górnik Łęczna	2017		14	0
21	Murad Sattarli	(Azerbaijan)	MF	9 May 1992 (aged 26)	AZAL	2016		11	0
28	Tamkin Khalilzade	(Azerbaijan)	MF	6 August 1993 (aged 24)	AZAL	2015		79	6
74	Yusif Nabiyev	(Azerbaijan)	DF	3 September 1997 (aged 20)	loan from Gabala	2017		8	0
99	Nijat Gurbanov	(Azerbaijan)	MF	17 February 1992 (aged 26)	Kapaz	2017		36	4

== Transfers ==
=== In ===
Date	Position	Nationality	Name	From	Fee	Ref.
18 May 2017	MF	(Azerbaijan)	Nijat Gurbanov	Kapaz	Undisclosed	
29 May 2017	MF	(Azerbaijan)	Rashad Sadiqov	Gabala	Undisclosed	
30 May 2017	FW	(Ghana)	Richard Gadze	Delhi Dynamos	Undisclosed	
31 May 2017	FW	(Azerbaijan)	Orkhan Aliyev	Kapaz	Undisclosed	
9 June 2017	FW	(Central African Republic)	David Manga	Hapoel Ashkelon	Undisclosed	
16 June 2017	FW	(Haiti)	Kervens Belfort	Syrianska	Undisclosed	
25 June 2017	DF	(Romania)	Gabriel Matei	Górnik Łęczna	Undisclosed	
4 September 2017	MF	(Mali)	Sadio Tounkara	AZAL	Undisclosed	
30 December 2017	MF	(Azerbaijan)	Tellur Mutallimov	Gabala	Undisclosed	
30 December 2017	DF	(Azerbaijan)	Ibrahim Aslanli	Qarabağ	Undisclosed	
	DF	(Cameroon)	Joseph Boum		Free	
	MF	(Azerbaijan)	Vugar Mustafayev	Qarabağ	Undisclosed	
	MF	(Moldova)	Alexandru Dedov	Milsami Orhei	Undisclosed	

=== Out ===
Date	Position	Nationality	Name	To	Fee	Ref.
5 June 2017	MF	(Azerbaijan)	Elvin Mammadov	Gabala	Undisclosed	
26 July 2017	DF	(Nigeria)	Akeem Latifu	Budapest Honvéd	Undisclosed	
18 August 2017	FW	(Haiti)	Kervens Belfort	Jamshedpur	Undisclosed	
15 December 2017	FW	(Central African Republic)	David Manga	Hapoel Ashkelon	Undisclosed	
25 December 2017	MF	(Azerbaijan)	Murad Sattarli	Kapaz	Undisclosed	
25 December 2017	MF	(Azerbaijan)	Nijat Gurbanov	Sumgayit	Undisclosed	
29 December 2017	DF	(Romania)	Gabriel Matei	Termalica	Undisclosed	
30 December 2017	MF	(Azerbaijan)	Tamkin Khalilzade	Gabala	Undisclosed	

=== Loans in ===
Date from	Position	Nationality	Name	From	Date to	Ref.
2 July 2017	DF	(Azerbaijan)	Yusif Nabiyev	Gabala	3 January 2018	
30 December 2017	MF	(Azerbaijan)	Mirsahib Abbasov	Keşla	End of Season	
30 December 2017	FW	(Azerbaijan)	Elshan Abdullayev	Qarabağ	End of Season	
7 February 2018	MF	(Trinidad and Tobago)	Jomal Williams	W Connection	End of Season	
8 February 2018	DF	(North Macedonia)	Yani Urdinov	Bohemians 1905	End of Season	

=== Released ===
Date	Position	Nationality	Name	Joined	Date
2 May 2017	MF	(Azerbaijan)	Tural Jalilov	Kapaz	11 May 2017
2 May 2017	DF	(Azerbaijan)	Yamin Agakerimzade	Səbail	
10 May 2017	MF	(Azerbaijan)	Javid Taghiyev	Sumgayit	10 June 2017
16 May 2017	MF	(Azerbaijan)	Nurlan Novruzov	Səbail	16 June 2017
31 May 2017	MF	(France)	Ben Sangaré	Sainte-Geneviève Sports	
31 May 2017	MF	(Georgia (country))	Giorgi Gorozia	Locomotive Tbilisi	4 July 2017
31 May 2017	MF	(Paraguay)	César Meza Colli	Keşla	6 February 2018
24 July 2017	MF	(Azerbaijan)	Rashad Sadiqov	Neftchi Baku	11 September
31 May 2018	GK	(Azerbaijan)	Abdulla Seyidəhmədov		
31 May 2018	DF	(Azerbaijan)	Aleksandr Shemonayev		
31 May 2018	DF	(Serbia)	Jovan Krneta	Levadiakos	22 July 2018
31 May 2018	MF	(Serbia)	Milan Đurić	Vojvodina	
31 May 2018	MF	(Nigeria)	Victor Igbekoyi	North Carolina	27 August 2018
31 May 2018	FW	(Azerbaijan)	Orkhan Aliyev	Sabail	2 June 2018
31 May 2018	FW	(Azerbaijan)	Elgün Nəbiyev	Sabah	
31 May 2018	FW	(Azerbaijan)	Jamal Jamalov		
31 May 2018	FW	(Ghana)	Richard Gadze	Voluntari	11 July 2018

=== Trial ===
Date From	Date To	Position	Nationality	Name	Last club
		DF	(Cameroon)	Joseph Boum	Antalyaspor

== Friendlies ==
13 June 2017	Inter Baku (Azerbaijan)	0 – 2	(Azerbaijan) Zira	Bolu, Turkey
16:30 AZT (UTC+4)		Report	Đurić; O.Aliyev

17 June 2017	Colombe (Cameroon)	0 – 8	(Azerbaijan) Zira	Bolu, Turkey
16:00 AZT (UTC+4)		Report	Belfort; Gadze; Trialist; O.Aliyev; Ilyasov; Guliyev

20 June 2017	Viitorul Constanța (Romania)	2 – 1	(Azerbaijan) Zira	Bolu, Turkey
17:00 AZT (UTC+4)	Goal	Report	O.Aliyev 3'

11 November 2017	Gabala	0 – 1	Zira	Baku
15:00 AZT (UTC+4)		Report	Gadze 77'	Stadium: Baku Olympic Stadium

19 January 2018	Keşla (Azerbaijan)	2 – 1	(Azerbaijan) Zira	Baku
AZT (UTC+4)	S.Akkoyun 67'; A.Mammadli 82'	Report	Gadze 86'	Stadium: Ismet Gaibov Stadium

27 January 2018	Zira (Azerbaijan)	2 – 0	(Romania) Voluntari	Antalya, Turkey
17:00 AZT (UTC+4)	E.Abdullayev; Isgandarli	Report		Stadium: Sensei de Lux Hotel

30 January 2018	Zira (Azerbaijan)	0 – 3	(Russia) Avangard Kursk	Manavgat, Turkey
16:00 AZT (UTC+4)		Report	Alshin 5'; Minayev 59'; Tarapovsky 77'	Stadium: Atatürk Stadium

5 February 2018	Zira (Azerbaijan)	1 – 2	(Hungary) Haladás	Antalya, Turkey
16:00 AZT (UTC+4)	Isgandarli 16'	Report	Mészáros 12'; Myke Ramos 15'	Stadium: Arcadia Hotel

== Competitions ==
=== Overview ===
Competition	First match	Last match	Starting round	Final position	Record							
Competition	First match	Last match	Starting round	Final position	Pld	W	D	L	GF	GA	GD	Win %
Premier League	13 August 2017	20 May 2018	Matchday 1	4th	28	12	8	8	36	30	+6	42.86
Azerbaijan Cup	29 November 2017	14 December 2017	Second Round	Quarterfinal	3	2	0	1	4	2	+2	66.67
UEFA Europa League	29 June 2017	20 July 2017	First Qualifying Round	Second Qualifying Round	4	2	1	1	5	4	+1	50.00
Total					35	16	9	10	45	36	+9	45.71

Last updated: 20 May 2018
Source: Competitions

=== Premier League ===
==== Results summary ====
Overall								Home						Away					
Pld	W	D	L	GF	GA	GD	Pts	W	D	L	GF	GA	GD	W	D	L	GF	GA	GD
28	12	8	8	35	29	+6	44	6	4	4	20	17	+3	6	4	4	15	12	+3

Last updated: 20 May 2018.
Source: See Results

==== Results ====
13 August 2017 1	Zira	2 – 1	Səbail	Zirə
19:00 AZT (UTC+4)	Đurić 3'; Gadze 17'; Krneta (yellow card) 87'	Report	Jarjué (yellow card) 8'; Nadirov 43'	Stadium: Zira Olympic Sport Complex Stadium; Attendance: 900; Referee: Rahim Həsənov

20 August 2017 2	Kapaz	0 – 3	Zira	Yevlakh
17:00 AZT (UTC+4)	S.Aliyev (yellow card) 60'	Report	N.Gurbanov 21'; Khalilzade 49', 87'; Mustafayev (yellow card) 81'	Stadium: Şəhər Stadium; Attendance: 2,000; Referee: Ravan Həmzəzadə

26 August 2017 3	Zira	3 – 1	Sumgayit	Zirə
18:00 AZT (UTC+4)	Mustafayev (yellow card) 51'; Gadze 52'; Isgandarli 61', 77' (yellow card) 61'; Đurić (yellow card) 63'	Report	E.Shahverdiyev (yellow card) 18'; T.Akhundov (yellow card) 37'; Boum 88' (o.g.)	Stadium: Zira Olympic Sport Complex Stadium; Attendance: 1,100; Referee: Omar Paşayev

9 September 2017 4	Gabala	1 – 1	Zira	Qabala
20:30 AZT (UTC+4)	Stanković (yellow card) 37'; Abbasov (yellow card) 83'; Huseynov 90+1'; Vernydub (yellow card) 90+1'	Report	Matei (yellow card) 58'; Igbekoyi 74' (yellow card) 90+1'	Stadium: Gabala City Stadium; Attendance: 1,200; Referee: Omar Paşayev

16 September 2017 5	Neftchi Baku	1 – 2	Zira	Baku
19:00 AZT (UTC+4)	Bargas (yellow card) 23' (goal) 54'; Meza (yellow card) 33'; M.Abbasov (yellow card) 72' (yellow-red card) 86'	Report	Matei (yellow card) 3'; Isgandarli 17' (yellow card) 30'; Y.Nabiyev (yellow card) 32'; Gadze 53'; Boum (yellow card) 85'	Stadium: Bakcell Arena; Attendance: 1,620; Referee: Aliyar Ağayev

23 September 2017 6	Zira	1 – 1	Inter Baku	Zirə
20:00 AZT (UTC+4)	Khalilzade (yellow card) 38'; Krneta 67' (yellow card) 80'; N.Gurbanov (yellow card) 87'; Gadze (yellow card) 90+5'	Report	S.Tashkin 21'; Qirtimov (yellow card) 25' (yellow-red card) 43'; Hajiyev (yellow card) 47'; Denis (yellow card) 90+5'	Stadium: Zira Olympic Sport Complex Stadium; Attendance: 1,200; Referee: Ingilab Məmmədov

1 October 2017 7	Qarabağ	0 – 0	Zira	Baku
18:00 AZT (UTC+4)	Elyounoussi (yellow card) 55'; Ndlovu (yellow card) 89'; Guerrier (yellow card) 90+3'	Report	Nazirov (yellow card) 90+1'	Stadium: Tofiq Bahramov Republican Stadium; Attendance: 2,500; Referee: Rauf Jabbarov

14 October 2017 8	Zira	3 – 0	Kapaz	Zirə
16:00 AZT (UTC+4)	Đurić (yellow card) 27'; Khalilzade 47', 64'; Gadze 76'	Report	N.Mammadov (yellow card) 70'; S.Aliyev (yellow card) 82'	Stadium: Zira Olympic Sport Complex Stadium; Attendance: 1,100; Referee: Rahim Həsənov

21 October 2017 9	Sumgayit	2 – 1	Zira	Sumqayit
17:00 AZT (UTC+4)	Tounkara 5' (yellow card) 17'; Mustafayev (yellow card) 27'; Khalilzade (yellow card) 81'; Boum (yellow card) 85'	Report	T.Akhundov (yellow card) 19'; Yunanov 38'; K.Najafov (yellow card) 55'; V.Beybalayev (yellow card) 70'; Hüseynov (yellow card) 73' (goal) 83'	Stadium: Kapital Bank Arena; Attendance: 1,300; Referee: Ingilab Məmmədov

28 October 2017 10	Zira	2 – 1	Gabala	Zirə
17:00 AZT (UTC+4)	Đurić 19' (pen.) (yellow card) 43'; Tounkara 38' (yellow card) 72'; K.Bayramov (yellow card) 44'; Gadze (yellow card) 63'; Boum (yellow card) 79'; Naghiyev (yellow card) 81'; Khalilzade (yellow card) 90+3'	Report	Abbasov (yellow card) 33'; Stanković (yellow card) 35'; J.Huseynov (red card); Ehiosun (yellow card) 51'; Koné 72'	Stadium: Zira Olympic Sport Complex Stadium; Attendance: 1,150; Referee: Yusifov

5 November 2017 11	Zira	1 – 0	Neftchi Baku	Zirə
17:00 AZT (UTC+4)	Gadze 30' (yellow card) 41'	Report	Sadiqov (yellow card) 40'; Meza (yellow card) 89'	Stadium: Zira Olympic Sport Complex Stadium; Attendance: 1,400; Referee: Omar Paşayev

18 November 2017 12	Keşla	0 – 1	Zira	Baku
13:00 AZT (UTC+4)	Qirtimov (yellow card) 56'	Report	Đurić 18'; Igbekoyi (yellow card) 42'	Stadium: Inter Arena; Attendance: 1,750; Referee: Ramil Diniyev

26 November 2017 13	Zira	2 – 3	Qarabağ	Zirə
18:00 AZT (UTC+4)	Isgandarli 51'; Gadze 68'; Khalilzade (yellow card) 69'	Report	Richard 22' (yellow card) 67'; Ndlovu 26'; Madatov (yellow card) 48' (goal) 63'; Rzeźniczak (yellow card) 76'; S.Məhəmmədəliyev (yellow card) 90+4'	Stadium: Zira Olympic Sport Complex Stadium; Attendance: 1,200; Referee: Fariz Yusifov

3 December 2017 14	Səbail	0 – 1	Zira	Baku
18:30 AZT (UTC+4)	P.Garakhanov (yellow card) 61'; Maudo (yellow card) 74'	Report	Muradov (yellow card) 34'; Naghiyev 39'; Mustafayev (yellow card) 68'; Gadze (yellow card) 85'	Stadium: Bayil Arena; Attendance: Omar Paşayev; Referee: 350

10 February 2018 15	Zira	1 – 1	Sumgayit	Zirə
16:10 AZT (UTC+4)	Isgandarli 40'; Krneta (yellow card) 75'	Report	T.Akhundov 35'; V.Beybalayev (yellow card) 87'; Hüseynov (yellow card) 90+2'	Stadium: Zira Olympic Sport Complex Stadium; Attendance: 500; Referee: Aliyar Ağayev

17 February 2018 16	Gabala	2 – 1	Zira	Qabala
15:00 AZT (UTC+4)	Qurbanov (yellow card) 43'; G.Aliyev (yellow card) 46'; Joseph-Monrose 56'; Dabo 64'	Report	Dedov (yellow card) 32' (goal) 39'; Urdinov (yellow card) 43'; Muradov (yellow card) 51'; Đurić (yellow card) 65'; Mustafayev (yellow card) 66'	Stadium: Gabala City Stadium; Attendance: 1,400; Referee: Rauf Jabbarov

24 February 2018 17	Neftchi Baku	1 – 1	Zira	Baku
18:00 AZT (UTC+4)	Herrera 22' (yellow card) 90+4'; Alaskarov (yellow card) 64'	Report	Urdinov (yellow card) 19'; Williams 30'; Muradov (yellow card) 45' (yellow-red card) 76'; Isgandarli (yellow card) 90'	Stadium: Bakcell Arena; Attendance: 500; Referee: Ramil Diniyev

4 March 2018 18	Zira	1 – 2	Keşla	Zirə
18:00 AZT (UTC+4)	Đurić (yellow card) 25'; E.Abdullayev 30'	Report	Guliyev 14'; S.Alkhasov 74'; Denis (yellow card) 90+4'	Stadium: Zira Olympic Sport Complex Stadium; Attendance: 800; Referee: Aliyar Ağayev

10 March 2018 19	Qarabağ	2 – 0	Zira	Baku
19:00 AZT (UTC+4)	Quintana 22'; Yunuszade 35'; Diniyev (yellow card) 69'; Medvedev (yellow card) 77'; Míchel (yellow card) 90+3'	Report	Đurić (yellow card) 56'; Tounkara (yellow card) 65'	Stadium: Azersun Arena; Attendance: 600; Referee: Elvin Asgarov

14 March 2018 20	Zira	1 – 1	Səbail	Zirə
17:00 AZT (UTC+4)	Dedov 17'; Naghiyev (yellow card) 59'; Muradov (yellow card) 71'	Report	R.Mammadov (yellow card) 42'; N.Apakidze 54'; Orazsähedow (yellow card) 59'; N.Novruzov (yellow card) 90+1'	Stadium: Zira Olympic Sport Complex Stadium; Attendance: 1,200; Referee: Orkhan Məmmədov

1 April 2018 21	Kapaz	0 – 0	Zira	Ganja
15:00 AZT (UTC+4)	Mandzhgaladze (yellow card) 59'	Report	Đurić (yellow card) 45+1'; Williams (yellow card) 64'	Stadium: Ganja City Stadium; Attendance: 5,650; Referee: Rahim Həsənov

8 April 2018 22	Zira	1 – 1	Gabala	Zirə
16:30 AZT (UTC+4)	Đurić 53' (pen.); Williams (yellow card) 56'	Report	Joseph-Monrose 78'; Khalilzade (yellow card) 90+3'	Stadium: Zira Olympic Sport Complex Stadium; Attendance: 1,000; Referee: Ravan Həmzəzadə

15 April 2018 23	Zira	0 – 3	Neftchi Baku	Zirə
19:00 AZT (UTC+4)	Urdinov (yellow card) 18' (yellow-red card) 51'; Tounkara (yellow card) 20'; S.Guliyev (yellow card) 57'; Gadze (yellow card) 90'	Report	Hajiyev 10' (pen.); Petrov Mustivar (yellow card) 61'; Mahmudov (yellow card) 73'; Aghayev (yellow card) 81'; Herrera 90+1'; Sadiqov 90+5'	Stadium: Zira Olympic Sport Complex Stadium; Attendance: 850; Referee: Rahim Həsənov

21 April 2018 24	Keşla	2 – 1	Zira	Baku
16:00 AZT (UTC+4)	O.Sadigli (yellow card) 45'; Clennon 50' (yellow card) 90+2'; Javadov 69'	Report	Đurić (yellow card) 16' (goal) 36' (pen.); Naghiyev (yellow card) 81'	Stadium: Inter Arena; Attendance: 1,000; Referee: Orkhan Məmmədov

27 April 2018 25	Zira	1 – 2	Qarabağ	Zirə
19:00 AZT (UTC+4)	Dedov 61'; Naghiyev (yellow card) 82'; Urdinov (yellow card) 82'; Igbekoyi (yellow card) 88'	Report	Guerrier (yellow card) 27' (goal) 55'; Richard (yellow card) 71'; Míchel 90+2'	Stadium: Zira Olympic Sport Complex Stadium; Attendance: 750; Referee: Rauf Jabbarov

5 May 2018 26	Səbail	0 – 1	Zira	Baku
17:00 AZT (UTC+4)	Tagaýew (yellow card) 11'; N.Apakidze (yellow card) 56'	Report	Igbekoyi (yellow card) 9'; M.İlyasov 16'; Gadze (yellow card) 33'; S.Guliyev (yellow card) 85'; M.Abbasov (yellow card) 90+2'	Stadium: Bayil Arena; Attendance: 500; Referee: Ingilab Məmmədov

12 May 2018 27	Zira	2 – 1	Kapaz	Zirə
19:00 AZT (UTC+4)	Đurić (red card) 9'; Gadze 42'; Boum (yellow card) 55'; Mutallimov 75'	Report	K.Abdullazada (yellow card) 42' (yellow-red card) 80'; S.Rahimov 45+2' (pen.); Sattarli (yellow card) 60'; S.Zargarov (yellow card) 90+3'	Stadium: Zira Olympic Sport Complex Stadium; Attendance: 1,110; Referee: Ramil Diniyev

20 May 2018 28	Sumgayit	1 – 2	Zira	Sumqayit
17:15 AZT (UTC+4)	Imamverdiyev 13'; K.Najafov (yellow card) 43'; V.Beybalayev (yellow card) 57'	Report	Mustafayev (yellow card) 11'; Gadze (yellow card) 45+3'; Dedov 68' (yellow card) 74'; Urdinov (yellow card) 81'; Nazirov (yellow card) 90+2'; Tounkara 90+5' (yellow card) 90+5'	Stadium: Kapital Bank Arena; Attendance: 1,300; Referee: Rauf Jabbarov

==== League table ====
Pos	Team	Pld	W	D	L	GF	GA	GD	Pts	Qualification or relegation
2	Gabala	28	14	7	7	43	26	+17	49	Qualification for the Europa League first qualifying round
3	Neftçi Baku	28	14	4	10	39	28	+11	46	Qualification for the Europa League first qualifying round
4	Zira	28	12	8	8	36	30	+6	44	
5	Sumgayit	28	11	7	10	34	33	+1	40	
6	Keşla	28	8	7	13	29	39	−10	31	Qualification for the Europa League first qualifying round (Note: Keşla qualified for the Europa League first qualifying round by winning 2017–18 Azerbaijan Cup.)

Source: UEFA, Soccerway
Rules for classification: 1) Points; 2) Head-to-head points; 3) Head-to-head goal difference; 4) Head-to-head goals scored; 5) Head-to-head away goals scored (only if two teams); 6) Goal difference; 7) Goals scored.

=== Azerbaijan Cup ===
29 November 2017 Second Round	Zira	3 – 0	Khazar Baku	Zirə
16:00 AZT (UTC+4)	A.Shemonayev (yellow card) 30'; S.Guliyev (yellow card) 45'; Isgandarli 58', 83'; O.Aliyev 80'; M.Bayramov (yellow card) 86'	Report	E.Rəhimzadə (yellow card) 62'; M.Teymurov (yellow card) 72'	Stadium: Zira Olympic Sport Complex Stadium; Attendance: 500; Referee: Orkhan Məmmədov

10 December 2017 Quarterfinal 1st leg	Zira	1 – 0	Neftchi Baku	Zirə
16:00 AZT (UTC+4)	Mustafayev (yellow card) 40'; A.Shemonayev (yellow card) 43'; S.Guliyev (yellow card) 60'; Manga 86'; Gadze (yellow card) 88'	Report	Abışov (yellow card) 88'; Mirzabeyov (yellow card) 90+1'	Stadium: Zira Olympic Sport Complex Stadium; Attendance: 1,000; Referee: Ingilab Mammadov

14 December 2017 Quarterfinal 2nd leg	Neftchi Baku	2 – 0 (2 – 1 agg.)	Zira	Baku
19:00 AZT (UTC+4)	Bargas 37'; M.Abbasov 45+2'	Report		Stadium: Bakcell Arena; Referee: Fariz Yusifov

=== UEFA Europa League ===
==== Qualifying rounds ====
29 June 2017 First qualifying round 1st leg	Zira (Azerbaijan)	2 – 0	(Luxembourg) Differdange 03	Baku (Note: Zira will play their home match at Dalga Arena, Baku, instead of their regular stadium Zira Olympic Sport Complex Stadium.) Azerbaijan
21:00 AZT (UTC+4)	Gadze 22'; Đurić (yellow card) 28'; Belfort 80'	Report	A.Rodrigues (yellow card) 40'	Stadium: Dalga Arena, Attendance: 4,650; Referee: Daniyar Sakhi (Kazakhstan)

6 July 2017 First qualifying round 2nd leg	Differdange 03 (Luxembourg)	1 – 2 (1 – 4 agg.)	(Azerbaijan) Zira	Differdange, Luxembourg
20:00 AZT (UTC+4)	Vandenbroeck 11'; M.Hamzaoui (yellow card) 62'	Report	Nazirov (yellow card) 40'; Manga 64'; Gadze 68'	Stadium: Stade Municipal; Attendance: 1,626; Referee: Boris Marhefka (Slovakia)

13 July 2017 Second qualifying round 1st leg	Astra Giurgiu (Romania)	3 – 1	(Azerbaijan) Zira	Giurgiu, Romania
21:30 AZT (UTC+4)	Ioniță 31' (yellow card) 36'; Dandea 55'; Le Tallec 74'	Report	Sadiqov 34'; A.Shemonayev (yellow card) 53'; Boum (yellow card) 63'	Stadium: Marin Anastasovici; Attendance: 1,730; Referee: Sergey Tsinkevich (Belarus)

20 July 2017 Second qualifying round 2nd leg	Zira (Azerbaijan)	0 – 0 (1 – 3 agg.)	(Romania) Astra Giurgiu	Baku Azerbaijan
21:00 AZT (UTC+4)	Đurić (yellow card) 30'; Gadze (yellow card) 39'; Igbekoyi (yellow card) 57'	Report	Ioniță (yellow card) 47'; Nicoară (yellow card) 48'	Stadium: Dalga Arena, Attendance: 4,200; Referee: Giorgi Vadachkoria (Georgia)

== Squad statistics ==
As of match played 20 May 2018

=== Appearances and goals ===
No.	Pos	Nat	Player	Total		Premier League		Azerbaijan Cup		Europa League	
No.	Pos	Nat	Player	Apps	Goals	Apps	Goals	Apps	Goals	Apps	Goals
1	GK	(Azerbaijan) AZE	Anar Nazirov	20	0	16	0	0	0	4	0
3	DF	(Cameroon) CMR	Joseph Boum	21	0	16+1	0	0	0	4	0
4	MF	(Azerbaijan) AZE	Vugar Mustafayev	32	0	24+2	0	3	0	2+1	0
5	DF	(Azerbaijan) AZE	Adil Naghiyev	28	1	22+2	1	2	0	1+1	0
7	MF	(Mali) MLI	Sadio Tounkara	18	3	10+5	3	2+1	0	0	0
8	MF	(Serbia) SRB	Milan Đurić	27	5	21	5	2	0	3+1	0
9	MF	(Moldova) MDA	Alexandru Dedov	11	4	8+3	4	0	0	0	0
10	MF	(Azerbaijan) AZE	Orkhan Aliyev	9	0	4+1	0	0+1	0	2+1	0
11	MF	(Nigeria) NGR	Victor Igbekoyi	31	1	11+14	1	2+1	0	2+1	0
13	DF	(Azerbaijan) AZE	Aleksandr Shemonayev	11	0	3+4	0	2	0	1+1	0
14	MF	(Azerbaijan) AZE	Tellur Mutallimov	11	1	9+2	1	0	0	0	0
16	DF	(Azerbaijan) AZE	Ibrahim Aslanli	4	0	4	0	0	0	0	0
17	MF	(Azerbaijan) AZE	Vusal Isgandarli	27	7	11+13	5	1+2	2	0	0
18	DF	(North Macedonia) MKD	Yani Urdinov	12	0	12	0	0	0	0	0
19	FW	(Azerbaijan) AZE	Elgun Nabiyev	2	0	0+2	0	0	0	0	0
23	DF	(Serbia) SRB	Jovan Krneta	25	1	19	1	2	0	4	0
29	MF	(Trinidad and Tobago) TTO	Jomal Williams	12	1	8+4	1	0	0	0	0
38	MF	(Azerbaijan) AZE	Ilkin Muradov	20	0	11+6	0	3	0	0	0
39	DF	(Azerbaijan) AZE	Sadig Guliyev	18	0	11+4	0	2	0	0+1	0
43	FW	(Ghana) GHA	Richard Gadze	29	9	22+1	7	2	0	3+1	2
62	GK	(Azerbaijan) AZE	Abdulla Seyidahmadov	1	0	1	0	0	0	0	0
77	MF	(Azerbaijan) AZE	Mirsahib Abbasov	7	0	2+5	0	0	0	0	0
85	GK	(Azerbaijan) AZE	Kamal Bayramov	14	0	11	0	3	0	0	0
87	MF	(Azerbaijan) AZE	Müşfiq İlyasov	6	1	5	1	0+1	0	0	0
88	FW	(Azerbaijan) AZE	Elshan Abdullayev	9	1	7+2	1	0	0	0	0
	DF	(Azerbaijan) AZE	Milad Bayramov	1	0	0	0	1	0	0	0
Players who left Zira during the season:
6	MF	(Azerbaijan) AZE	Rashad Sadiqov	4	1	0	0	0	0	3+1	1
9	FW	(Central African Republic) CAF	David Manga	20	2	8+5	0	2+1	1	4	1
10	FW	(Haiti) HAI	Kervens Belfort	6	1	1+1	0	0	0	4	1
14	DF	(Romania) ROU	Gabriel Matei	14	0	10	0	0	0	4	0
21	MF	(Azerbaijan) AZE	Murad Sattarli	1	0	0	0	1	0	0	0
28	MF	(Azerbaijan) AZE	Tamkin Khalilzade	19	4	13	4	2	0	3+1	0
74	DF	(Azerbaijan) AZE	Yusif Nabiyev	8	0	7	0	0+1	0	0	0
99	MF	(Azerbaijan) AZE	Nijat Gurbanov	9	1	1+4	1	1+1	0	0+2	0

=== Goal scorers ===
Place	Position	Nation	Number	Name	Premier League	Azerbaijan Cup	Europa League	Total
1	FW	(Ghana)	43	Richard Gadze	7	0	2	9
2	MF	(Azerbaijan)	17	Vusal Isgandarli	5	2	0	7
3	MF	(Serbia)	8	Milan Đurić	5	0	0	5
4	MF	(Azerbaijan)	28	Tamkin Khalilzade	4	0	0	4
4	MF	(Moldova)	9	Alexandru Dedov	4	0	0	4
6	MF	(Mali)	7	Sadio Tounkara	3	0	0	3
7	FW	(Central African Republic)	9	David Manga	0	1	1	2
8	FW	(Azerbaijan)	99	Nijat Gurbanov	1	0	0	1
8	MF	(Nigeria)	11	Victor Igbekoyi	1	0	0	1
8	DF	(Serbia)	23	Jovan Krneta	1	0	0	1
8	DF	(Azerbaijan)	5	Adil Naghiyev	1	0	0	1
8	MF	(Trinidad and Tobago)	29	Jomal Williams	1	0	0	1
8	FW	(Azerbaijan)	88	Elshan Abdullayev	1	0	0	1
8	MF	(Azerbaijan)	87	Müşfiq İlyasov	1	0	0	1
8	MF	(Azerbaijan)	14	Tellur Mutallimov	1	0	0	1
8	MF	(Azerbaijan)	10	Orkhan Aliyev	0	1	0	1
8	FW	(Haiti)	7	Kervens Belfort	0	0	1	1
8	MF	(Azerbaijan)	6	Rashad Sadiqov	0	0	1	1
				TOTALS	36	4	5	45

=== Disciplinary record ===
Number	Nation	Position	Name	Premier League		Azerbaijan Cup		Europa League		Total	
Number	Nation	Position	Name	Yellow card	Red card	Yellow card	Red card	Yellow card	Red card	Yellow card	Red card
1	(Azerbaijan)	GK	Anar Nazirov	2	0	0	0	1	0	3	0
3	(Cameroon)	DF	Joseph Boum	4	0	0	0	1	0	5	0
4	(Azerbaijan)	MF	Vugar Mustafayev	6	0	2	0	0	0	8	0
5	(Azerbaijan)	DF	Adil Naghiyev	4	0	0	0	0	0	4	0
7	(Mali)	MF	Sadio Tounkara	5	0	1	0	0	0	6	0
8	(Serbia)	MF	Milan Đurić	8	1	1	0	2	0	11	1
9	(Moldova)	MF	Alexandru Dedov	2	0	0	0	0	0	2	0
11	(Nigeria)	MF	Victor Igbekoyi	4	0	0	0	1	0	5	0
13	(Azerbaijan)	DF	Aleksandr Shemonayev	0	0	2	0	1	0	3	0
17	(Azerbaijan)	MF	Vusal Isgandarli	3	0	0	0	0	0	3	0
18	(North Macedonia)	DF	Yani Urdinov	6	1	0	0	0	0	6	1
23	(Serbia)	DF	Jovan Krneta	3	0	0	1	0	0	3	1
29	(Trinidad and Tobago)	MF	Jomal Williams	2	0	0	0	0	0	2	0
38	(Azerbaijan)	MF	Ilkin Muradov	5	1	0	0	0	0	5	1
39	(Azerbaijan)	DF	Sadig Guliyev	2	0	2	0	0	0	4	0
43	(Ghana)	FW	Richard Gadze	7	0	1	0	1	0	9	0
77	(Azerbaijan)	MF	Mirsahib Abbasov	1	0	0	0	0	0	1	0
85	(Azerbaijan)	GK	Kamal Bayramov	1	0	1	0	0	0	2	0
	(Azerbaijan)	DF	Milad Bayramov	0	0	1	0	0	0	1	0
Players who left Zira during the season:
14	(Romania)	DF	Gabriel Matei	2	0	0	0	0	0	2	0
28	(Azerbaijan)	MF	Tamkin Khalilzade	4	0	0	0	0	0	4	0
74	(Azerbaijan)	DF	Yusif Nabiyev	1	0	0	0	0	0	1	0
99	(Azerbaijan)	MF	Nijat Gurbanov	1	0	0	0	0	0	1	0
			TOTALS	73	3	11	1	7	0	91	4
