= Francisco García =

Francisco García may refer to:

== Sportsmen ==
- Francisco García (athlete) (born 1949), Spanish Olympic sprinter
- Francisco García (basketball) (born 1981), Dominican professional basketball player who plays in the National Basketball Association
- Francisco García (rugby union) (born 1970), former Argentine rugby union player
- Francisco García (footballer, born 1988), Paraguayan forward
- Francisco García (footballer, born 1990), Salvadoran defender
- Francisco García (footballer, born 1991), Paraguayan midfielder
- Francisco García (footballer, born 1998), Argentine midfielder
- Francisco García (footballer, born 2003), Mexican forward
- Francisco García (sailor) (born 1947), Spanish Olympic sailor
- Francisco García Gómez (1938–2024), Spanish international footballer and coach
- Francisco García Hernández (born 1954), Spanish footballer and coach
- Francisco García Moreno (1947–2016), Mexican Olympic water polo player
- Francisco García Solsona (born 1992), Spanish footballer
- Javi García (Francisco Javier García Fernández, born 1987), Spanish footballer
- Francisco Sérgio García (born 1948), Brazilian basketball player

== Religious figures ==
- Francisco García de la Rosa Figueroa, Franciscan
- Francisco Garcia de Padilla (died 1515), bishop of Santo Domingo
- Francisco García Diego y Moreno (1785–1846), bishop of California

== Politicians ==
- Francisco García Cabeza de Vaca (born 1967), Mexican politician
- Francisco García Calderón (1834–1905), president of Peru
- Francisco García Larios (fl. 1740s), governor of Spanish Texas
- Francisco García Lizardi (born 1941), Mexican politician
- Francisco García Salinas (1786–1841), Mexican politician

== Others ==
- Francisco García Calderón Rey (1883–1953), Peruvian writer
- Francisco García Escalero (1948–2014), Spanish serial killer
- Francisco García-Escámez (1893–1951), Spanish army officer
- Francisco García Paramés (born 1963), Spanish fund manager
- Francisco García Romero (1559–?), Spanish conquistador
- Francisco García Tortosa (1937–2024), Spanish professor, literary critic and translator
- Francis García (Francisco Garcia, 1958–2007), Mexican actor and designer

== See also ==
- Fran García (disambiguation)
- Francisco Javier García (disambiguation)
- Frank Garcia (disambiguation)
