= 2017–18 Neftchi Baku PFK season =

Neftchi Baku
2017–18 season
- Chairman: Chingiz Abdullayev
- Manager: Elkhan Abdullayev (until 21 August); Elshad Ahmedov (Caretaker) (21 August-11 September); Tarlan Ahmadov (from 11 September)
- Stadium: Bakcell Arena
- Premier League: 3rd
- Azerbaijan Cup: Semifinal vs Gabala
- Top goalscorer: League: Ignacio Herrera (8); All: Ignacio Herrera (8)
| Home colours | Away colours | Third colours |

The Neftchi Baku 2017–18 season is Neftchi Baku's 26th Azerbaijan Premier League season. Neftchi will compete Azerbaijan Premier League and in the 2017–18 Azerbaijan Cup.

== Season events ==
On 21 August Elkhan Abdullayev resigned as the club's manager, with Elshad Ahmedov taking over in a caretaker role. On 11 September, Tarlan Ahmadov was announced as the club's new manager.

== Squad ==
As of 27 March 2018

Note: Flags indicate national team as defined under FIFA eligibility rules; some limited exceptions apply. Players may hold more than one non-FIFA nationality.

| No. | Pos. | Nation | Player |
|---|---|---|---|
| 1 | GK | AZE | Salahat Aghayev |
| 2 | DF | AZE | Ilkin Qirtimov |
| 3 | DF | AZE | Farid Abbasli |
| 5 | DF | AZE | Anton Krivotsyuk |
| 6 | MF | AZE | Rashad Sadiqov |
| 7 | MF | AZE | Namig Alasgarov |
| 8 | MF | AZE | Emin Mahmudov |
| 9 | FW | ARG | Lucas Gómez |
| 10 | MF | PAR | David Meza |
| 11 | FW | CHI | Ignacio Herrera |
| 12 | MF | COL | Mike Campaz |
| 15 | DF | AZE | Ruslan Abışov (captain) |

| No. | Pos. | Nation | Player |
|---|---|---|---|
| 17 | MF | AZE | Rahman Hajiyev |
| 19 | MF | PAR | Francisco García |
| 20 | MF | AZE | Elnur Suleymanov |
| 21 | DF | AZE | Magomed Mirzabekov |
| 22 | FW | AZE | Mirabdulla Abbasov |
| 25 | DF | UKR | Kyrylo Petrov |
| 51 | DF | AZE | Elchin Asadov |
| 66 | GK | AZE | Kamran Ibrahimov |
| 93 | MF | HAI | Soni Mustivar |
| 94 | GK | AZE | Rashad Azizli |
| 95 | DF | AZE | Elvin Badalov |
| 97 | MF | AZE | Elnur Jafarov |

=== Out on loan ===
Note: Flags indicate national team as defined under FIFA eligibility rules; some limited exceptions apply. Players may hold more than one non-FIFA nationality.

| No. | Pos. | Nation | Player |
|---|---|---|---|
| 19 | MF | AZE | Fahmin Muradbayli (at Sabail) |
| 53 | GK | AZE | Maksim Vaylo (at Sabah) |

| No. | Pos. | Nation | Player |
|---|---|---|---|
| 61 | DF | AZE | Tayyar Mammadov (at Sabah) |
| — | MF | AZE | Orkhan Gurbanli (at Sabail) |

== Transfers ==
=== Summer ===
In: Note: Flags indicate national team as defined under FIFA eligibility rules; some limited exceptions apply. Players may hold more than one non-FIFA nationality.

| No. | Pos. | Nation | Player |
|---|---|---|---|
| 1 | GK | AZE | Salahat Aghayev (from (Azerbaijan) Inter Baku) |
| 3 | DF | CRO | Mateo Mužek (from (Slovenia) Rudar Velenje) |
| 6 | MF | AZE | Rashad Sadiqov (from (Azerbaijan) Zira) |
| 10 | MF | PAR | David Meza Colli |
| 18 | MF | AZE | Emin Mahmudov (from (Portugal) Boavista) |
| 21 | DF | AZE | Magomed Mirzabekov (from (Azerbaijan) Gabala) |
| 22 | FW | AZE | Mirabdulla Abbasov (loan return from (Azerbaijan) Sumgayit) |
| 94 | GK | AZE | Rashad Azizli (from (Azerbaijan) Səbail) |
| 97 | MF | AZE | Elnur Jafarov (from (Croatia) Dugopolje) |

Out: Note: Flags indicate national team as defined under FIFA eligibility rules; some limited exceptions apply. Players may hold more than one non-FIFA nationality.

| No. | Pos. | Nation | Player |
|---|---|---|---|
| 3 | DF | BRA | Jairo (to (Iran) Sepahan) |
| 8 | MF | CZE | Zdeněk Folprecht (loan return to (Czech Republic) Slovan Liberec) |
| 10 | MF | AZE | Javid Imamverdiyev (to (Azerbaijan) Sumgayit) |
| 13 | MF | AZE | Murad Agayev (to (Azerbaijan) Səbail) |
| 21 | MF | AZE | Agshin Gurbanli (loan to (Azerbaijan) Səbail) |
| 22 | DF | AZE | Mahir Shukurov (Retired) |
| 26 | DF | AZE | Kamal Gurbanov (to (Azerbaijan) Səbail) |
| 29 | DF | GEO | Giorgi Navalovski (to (Russia) SKA-Khabarovsk) |
| 33 | GK | MNE | Boban Bajković |
| 61 | DF | AZE | Tayyar Mammadov (loan to (Azerbaijan) Səbail) |
| 66 | GK | AZE | Kamran Ibrahimov |
| 80 | MF | VEN | Edson Castillo (loan to (Venezuela) Mineros) |
| 88 | MF | AZE | Orkhan Gurbanli (loan to (Azerbaijan) Səbail) |
| — | GK | AZE | Ruzi Giyasli (to (Azerbaijan) Ağsu) |
| — | DF | AZE | Eltun Yagublu (loan return to (Azerbaijan) Qarabağ, previously on loan to (Azerbaijan) Səbail) |

=== Winter ===
In: Note: Flags indicate national team as defined under FIFA eligibility rules; some limited exceptions apply. Players may hold more than one non-FIFA nationality.

| No. | Pos. | Nation | Player |
|---|---|---|---|
| 2 | DF | AZE | Ilkin Qirtimov (from (Azerbaijan) Keshla) |
| 3 | DF | AZE | Farid Abbasli (from (Azerbaijan) Bine) |
| 9 | FW | ARG | Lucas Gómez (from (Venezuela) Deportivo Lara) |
| 12 | MF | COL | Mike Campaz (from (Costa Rica) UCR) |
| 19 | MF | PAR | Francisco García (from (Paraguay) Cerro Porteño) |
| 93 | MF | HAI | Soni Mustivar (from (United States) Sporting Kansas City) |
| — | GK | AZE | Agil Mammadov (from (Azerbaijan) Gabala) |

Out: Note: Flags indicate national team as defined under FIFA eligibility rules; some limited exceptions apply. Players may hold more than one non-FIFA nationality.

| No. | Pos. | Nation | Player |
|---|---|---|---|
| 3 | DF | CRO | Mateo Mužek |
| 4 | DF | AZE | Rahil Mammadov (to (Azerbaijan) Sabail) |
| 9 | FW | FRA | Hugo Bargas (to (Bolivia) Blooming) |
| 12 | FW | ESP | Daniel Segovia (to (India) Bengaluru) |
| 16 | DF | CZE | Pavel Dreksa (loan return to (Czech Republic) MFK Karviná) |
| 19 | MF | AZE | Fahmin Muradbayli (loan to (Azerbaijan) Sabail) |
| 21 | MF | AZE | Agshin Gurbanli (to (Azerbaijan) Səbail, previously on loan to (Azerbaijan) Səbail) |
| 23 | MF | AZE | Tarzin Jahangirov (to (Azerbaijan) Kapaz) |
| 27 | DF | AZE | Magsad Isayev (to (Azerbaijan) Keshla) |
| 53 | GK | AZE | Maksim Vaylo (loan to (Azerbaijan) Sabah) |
| 61 | DF | AZE | Tayyar Mammadov (loan to (Azerbaijan) Sabah, previously on loan to (Azerbaijan) Sabail) |
| 80 | MF | VEN | Edson Castillo (to (Venezuela) Academia Puerto Cabello, previously on loan to (Venezuela) Mineros) |
| — | GK | AZE | Agil Mammadov (to (Azerbaijan) Gabala) |

Trial: Note: Flags indicate national team as defined under FIFA eligibility rules; some limited exceptions apply. Players may hold more than one non-FIFA nationality.

| No. | Pos. | Nation | Player |
|---|---|---|---|
| — | DF | MAR | Rochdi Achenteh |
| — | MF | UKR | Ihor Sikorskyi |

== Friendlies ==
| 26 July 2017 | Schalke 04 (Germany) | 1 – 0 | (Azerbaijan) Neftchi Baku | Neukirchen, Austria |
| 20:00 AZT (UTC+4) | Tekpetey 27' | | | Stadium: Wildkogel-Arena; Attendance: 1000; Referee: Thomas Hochstaffl |

| 14 January 2018 | Keşla | 2 – 1 | Neftchi Baku | Baku |
| AZT (UTC+4) | M.Isayev 75'; Fardjad-Azad 77' | Report | Abbasov (1st half) | Stadium: Ismet Gaibov Stadium |

| 22 January 2018 | Neftchi Baku (Azerbaijan) | 1 – 8 | (Russia) SKA-Khabarovsk | Antalya, Turkey |
| 17:00 AZT (UTC+4) | Abbasov 85' | Report | Kabutov 2', 89'; Nikiforov 8', 17', 49'; Samsonov 10', 20'; Kalinsky 37' |

| 25 January 2018 | Neftchi Baku (Azerbaijan) | 0 – 1 | (Romania) Concordia Chiajna | Antalya, Turkey |
| AZT (UTC+4) | | Report | Cristescu 54' |

| 25 January 2018 | Neftchi Baku (Azerbaijan) | 0 – 1 | (Bulgaria) Slavia Sofia | Antalya, Turkey |
| AZT (UTC+4) | | Report |

| 27 January 2018 | Neftchi Baku (Azerbaijan) | 0 – 2 | (Russia) Krylia Sovetov | Antalya, Turkey |
| AZT (UTC+4) | | Report |

| 30 January 2018 | Neftchi Baku (Azerbaijan) | 0 – 3 | (North Macedonia) Sileks | Antalya, Turkey |
| AZT (UTC+4) | | Report |

| 5 February 2018 | Neftchi Baku | 1 – 0 | Sabah | Baku |
| 15:00 AZT (UTC+4) | Mahmudov 73' | Report | | Stadium: Ismat Gayibov Stadium |

== Competitions ==
=== Overview ===
| Competition | First match | Last match | Starting round | Final position | Record | | | | | | | |
| Competition | First match | Last match | Starting round | Final position | Pld | W | D | L | GF | GA | GD | Win % |
|---|---|---|---|---|---|---|---|---|---|---|---|---|
| Premier League | 11 August 2017 | 20 May 2018 | Matchday 1 | 3rd | 28 | 14 | 4 | 10 | 39 | 28 | +11 | 50.00 |
| Azerbaijan Cup | 28 November 2017 | 18 April 2018 | Second round | Semifinal | 5 | 3 | 0 | 2 | 10 | 5 | +5 | 60.00 |
| Total | | | | | 33 | 17 | 4 | 12 | 49 | 33 | +16 | 51.52 |

Last updated: 20 May 2018
Source: Competitions

=== Premier League ===
==== Results summary ====
| Overall | | | | | | | | Home | | | | | | Away | | | | | |
| Pld | W | D | L | GF | GA | GD | Pts | W | D | L | GF | GA | GD | W | D | L | GF | GA | GD |
|---|---|---|---|---|---|---|---|---|---|---|---|---|---|---|---|---|---|---|---|
| 28 | 14 | 4 | 10 | 38 | 28 | +10 | 46 | 7 | 4 | 3 | 21 | 16 | +5 | 7 | 0 | 7 | 17 | 12 | +5 |

Last updated: 20 May 2018.
Source: See Results

==== Results ====
| 11 August 2017 1 | Neftchi Baku | 1 – 3 | Qarabağ | Baku |
| 21:00 AZT (UTC+4) | Bargas (yellow card) 44'; Petrov (yellow card) 62'; Amirguliyev 90' (o.g.) | Report | Madatov 15', 40'; Ndlovu 62' | Stadium: Bakcell Arena; Attendance: 4,800; Referee: Aliyar Ağayev |

| 18 August 2017 2 | Səbail | 1 – 0 | Neftchi Baku | Baku |
| 18:00 AZT (UTC+4) | T.Tsetskhladze (yellow card) 76'; Tagayev 90' (yellow card) 90+3' | Report | Meza (yellow card) 45+1'; F.Muradbayli (yellow card) 90+3' | Stadium: Dalga Arena; Attendance: 200; Referee: Ramil Diniyev |

| 25 August 2017 3 | Neftchi Baku | 0 – 0 | Kapaz | Baku |
| 20:30 AZT (UTC+4) | Petrov (yellow card) 23'; A.Krivotsyuk (yellow card) 31'; Dreksa (yellow card) 38'; Herrera (yellow card) 71' | Report | S.Rahimov (yellow card) 8'; A.Mammadov (yellow card) 76' | Stadium: Bakcell Arena; Attendance: 1,800; Referee: Orkhan Məmmədov |

| 10 September 2017 4 | Sumgayit | 1 – 0 | Neftchi Baku | Sumqayit |
| 19:00 AZT (UTC+4) | Yunanov 25' (pen.); K.Najafov (yellow card) 66' | Report | Petrov (yellow card) 66' | Stadium: Kapital Bank Arena; Attendance: 1,500; Referee: Rahim Həsənov |

| 16 September 2017 5 | Neftchi Baku | 1 – 2 | Zira | Baku |
| 19:00 AZT (UTC+4) | Bargas (yellow card) 23' (goal) 54'; Meza (yellow card) 33'; Abbasov (yellow card) 72' (yellow-red card) 86' | Report | Matei (yellow card) 3'; Isgandarli 17' (yellow card) 30'; Y.Nabiyev (yellow card) 32'; Gadze 53'; Boum (yellow card) 85' | Stadium: Bakcell Arena; Attendance: 1,620; Referee: Aliyar Ağayev |

| 24 September 2017 6 | Gabala | 2 – 1 | Neftchi Baku | Qabala |
| 18:00 AZT (UTC+4) | Joseph-Monrose 4' (red card) 90'; Dabo 40'; Halliday (yellow card) 58'; J.Huseynov (yellow card) 65' | Report | Alasgarov 48'; Sadiqov (yellow card) 52'; A.Krivotsyuk (yellow card) 63'; Abışov (yellow card) 81' | Stadium: Gabala City Stadium; Attendance: 1,000; Referee: Farizx Yusifov |

| 29 September 2017 7 | Inter Baku | 0 – 2 | Neftchi Baku | Baku |
| 16:00 AZT (UTC+4) | S.Tashkin (yellow card) 54'; Abbasov (yellow card) 90+2' | Report | Meza 60'; Hajiyev 72'; Petrov (yellow card) 90+2' | Stadium: Inter Arena; Attendance: 3,500; Referee: Omar Paşayev |

| 15 October 2017 8 | Səbail | 0 – 4 | Neftchi Baku | Baku |
| 18:30 AZT (UTC+4) | Tagaýew (yellow card) 6'; A.Mukhtaroglu (yellow card) 80' | Report | Herrera 17'; Bargas 31', 77'; A.Krivotsyuk (yellow card) 37'; Meza (yellow card) 58' (yellow-red card) 85'; Hajiyev 65' | Stadium: Dalga Arena; Attendance: 400; Referee: Fariz Yusifov |

| 21 October 2017 9 | Kapaz | 0 – 1 | Neftchi Baku | Yevlakh |
| 15:00 AZT (UTC+4) | K.Diniyev (yellow card) 80' | Report | Abışov 41' | Stadium: Şəhər Stadium; Attendance: 8,000; Referee: Aliyar Ağayev |

| 29 October 2017 10 | Neftchi Baku | 2 – 1 | Sumgayit | Baku |
| 18:00 AZT (UTC+4) | Abbasov 3'; Abışov (yellow card) 68'; Hajiyev 89' (yellow card) 89' | Report | T.Akhundov 38' (pen.) (yellow card) 87'; Eyyubov (yellow card) 69'; E.Shahverdiyev (yellow card) 90+1'; Malikov (yellow card) 90+2'; B.Hasanalizade (yellow card) 90+3' | Stadium: Bakcell Arena; Attendance: 4,000; Referee: Rauf Jabbarov |

| 5 November 2017 11 | Zira | 1 – 0 | Neftchi Baku | Zirə |
| 17:00 AZT (UTC+4) | Gadze 30' (yellow card) 41' | Report | Sadiqov (yellow card) 40'; Meza (yellow card) 89' | Stadium: Zira Olympic Sport Complex Stadium; Attendance: 1,400; Referee: Omar Paşayev |

| 19 November 2017 12 | Neftchi Baku | 2 – 3 | Gabala | Baku |
| 17:00 AZT (UTC+4) | Mahmudov 19'; Petrov 48'; A.Krivotsyuk (yellow card) 55' | Report | Dabo 22'; Qurbanov 56' (pen.); E.Jamalov (yellow card) 61'; Joseph-Monrose 80' | Stadium: Bakcell Arena; Attendance: 2,500; Referee: Aliyar Ağayev |

| 25 November 2017 13 | Neftchi Baku | 3 – 1 | Keşla | Baku |
| 17:00 AZT (UTC+4) | Abbasov 34'; Herrera 51'; Abışov 89' | Report | Scarlatache 69' | Stadium: Bakcell Arena; Attendance: 600; Referee: Rauf Jabbarov |
Note: On 28 October 2017, Inter Baku changed their name to Keşla FK.

| 1 December 2017 13 | Qarabağ | 1 – 0 | Neftchi Baku | Baku |
| 18:30 AZT (UTC+4) | Medvedev 25'; Míchel (yellow card) 90+3' | Report | | Stadium: Azersun Arena; Attendance: 3,800; Referee: Fariz Yusifov |

| 11 February 2018 15 | Neftchi Baku | 1 – 0 | Kapaz | Baku |
| 17:30 AZT (UTC+4) | Mirzabeyov (yellow card) 58'; Abbasov 86' | Report | I.Safarzade (yellow card) 57'; Diego Souza (yellow card) 74'; S.Rahimov (yellow card) 90+3' | Stadium: Bakcell Arena; Attendance: 2,000; Referee: Rahim Həsənov |

| 17 February 2018 16 | Sumgayit | 2 – 0 | Neftchi Baku | Sumqayit |
| 18:30 AZT (UTC+4) | T.Akhundov 13' (pen.); Yunanov 17'; B.Hasanalizade (yellow card) 49' | Report | Mahmudov (yellow card) 32'; Qirtimov (yellow card) 59'; Sadiqov (red card) 60'; Abışov (yellow card) 61'; Herrera (yellow card) 64'; García (yellow card) 69' | Stadium: Kapital Bank Arena; Attendance: 1,300; Referee: Ingilab Məmmədov |

| 24 February 2018 17 | Neftchi Baku | 1 – 1 | Zira | Baku |
| 18:00 AZT (UTC+4) | Herrera 22' (yellow card) 90+4'; Alaskarov (yellow card) 64' | Report | Urdinov (yellow card) 19'; Williams 30'; I.Muradov (yellow card) 45' (yellow-red card) 76'; Isgandarli (yellow card) 90' | Stadium: Bakcell Arena; Attendance: 500; Referee: Ramil Diniyev |

| 4 March 2018 18 | Gabala | 1 – 2 | Neftchi Baku | Qabala |
| 15:30 AZT (UTC+4) | Mammadov 34'; Dabo (yellow card) 38'; E.Jamalov (yellow card) 56'; Y.Nabiyev (red card) 83'; Stanković (yellow card) 88' | Report | Hajiyev (yellow card) 19'; Abbasov 59'; Herrera 73'; Mahmudov (yellow card) 76'; Petrov (yellow card) 87'; A.Krivotsyuk (yellow card) 90+1' | Stadium: Gabala City Stadium; Attendance: 3,000; Referee: Rauf Jabbarov |

| 9 March 2018 19 | Neftchi Baku | 3 – 2 | Keşla | Baku |
| 18:00 AZT (UTC+4) | Alaskarov 14'; Mahmudov (yellow card) 24'; Herrera 48'; Abışov 90' | Report | Sohna (yellow card) 10'; Scarlatache 16'; Fardjad-Azad 57' | Stadium: Bakcell Arena; Attendance: 800; Referee: Ramil Diniyev |

| 14 March 2018 20 | Neftchi Baku | 0 – 0 | Qarabağ | Baku |
| 18:00 AZT (UTC+4) | Mahmudov (yellow card) 89' | Report | | Stadium: Bakcell Arena; Attendance: 4,000 |

| 2 April 2018 21 | Neftchi Baku | 2 – 0 | Sabail | Baku |
| 19:30 AZT (UTC+4) | Herrera 49', 87'; Petrov (yellow card) 84' | Report | Cociuc (yellow card) 35'; T.Tsetskhladze (yellow card) 58'; Maudo (yellow card) 63' | Stadium: Bakcell Arena; Attendance: 600; Referee: Rauf Jabbarov |

| 8 April 2018 22 | Neftchi Baku | 2 – 2 | Sumgayit | Baku |
| 18:30 AZT (UTC+4) | Abışov (yellow card) 22'; Alaskarov (yellow card) 38' (goal) 63'; Abbasov 45'; Qirtimov (yellow card) 90' | Report | Eyyubov 41'; Imamverdiyev 79'; U.İsgəndərov (yellow card) 90' | Stadium: Bakcell Arena; Attendance: 2,500; Referee: Aliyar Ağayev |

| 15 April 2018 23 | Zira | 0 – 3 | Neftchi Baku | Zirə |
| 19:00 AZT (UTC+4) | Urdinov (yellow card) 18' (yellow-red card) 51'; Tounkara (yellow card) 20'; S.Guliyev (yellow card) 57'; Gadze (yellow card) 90' | Report | Hajiyev 10' (pen.); Petrov Mustivar (yellow card) 61'; Mahmudov (yellow card) 73'; Aghayev (yellow card) 81'; Herrera 90+1'; Sadiqov 90+5' | Stadium: Zira Olympic Sport Complex Stadium; Attendance: 850; Referee: Rahim Həsənov |

| 22 April 2018 24 | Neftchi Baku | 1 – 0 | Gabala | Baku |
| 19:00 AZT (UTC+4) | Abışov 4' (yellow card) 34'; Mahmudov (yellow card) 19' (yellow-red card) 63'; Petrov (yellow card) 32'; Alaskarov (yellow card) 41' | Report | Joseph-Monrose (yellow card) 21'; Ozobić (yellow card) 90' | Stadium: Bakcell Arena; Attendance: 1,500; Referee: Ingilab Məmmədov |

| 28 April 2018 25 | Keşla | 2 – 1 | Neftchi Baku | Baku |
| 16:00 AZT (UTC+4) | Javadov 22'; Meza (yellow card) 28'; N.Stojanovic (yellow card) 76'; Scarlatache 68'; Guliyev (yellow card) 90+1' | Report | Alaskarov 42'; Abışov (yellow card) 40' | Stadium: Inter Arena; Attendance: 1,000; Referee: Rahim Həsənov |

| 6 May 2018 26 | Qarabağ | 0 – 1 | Neftchi Baku | Baku |
| 19:00 AZT (UTC+4) | Míchel (yellow card) 43' | Report | Hajiyev 37' | Stadium: Azersun Arena; Attendance: 3,000; Referee: Aliyar Ağayev |

| 12 May 2018 27 | Neftchi Baku | 3 – 1 | Səbail | Baku |
| 19:00 AZT (UTC+4) | Alaskarov 33'; Hajiyev 36'; Meza (yellow card) 38'; Gómez 80'; A.Krivotsyuk (yellow card) 90+1' | Report | E.Yagublu (yellow card) 42'; Cociuc 83' (pen.) | Stadium: Dalga Arena; Attendance: 500; Referee: Rauf Jabbarov |

| 20 May 2018 28 | Kapaz | 1 – 2 | Neftchi Baku | Ganja |
| 17:15 AZT (UTC+4) | S.Aliyev (yellow card) 16'; Rahimov 67'; T.Rzayev (yellow card) 73' | Report | Abışov 64'; Petrov (yellow card) 70' (yellow-red card) 87'; Gómez 79' | Stadium: Ganja City Stadium; Attendance: 5,000; Referee: Rahim Həsənov |

==== League table ====
| Pos | Team | Pld | W | D | L | GF | GA | GD | Pts | Qualification or relegation |
|---|---|---|---|---|---|---|---|---|---|---|
| 1 | Qarabağ (C) | 28 | 20 | 5 | 3 | 37 | 13 | +24 | 65 | Qualification for the Champions League first qualifying round |
| 2 | Gabala | 28 | 14 | 7 | 7 | 43 | 26 | +17 | 49 | Qualification for the Europa League first qualifying round |
| 3 | Neftçi Baku | 28 | 14 | 4 | 10 | 39 | 28 | +11 | 46 | Qualification for the Europa League first qualifying round |
| 4 | Zira | 28 | 12 | 8 | 8 | 36 | 30 | +6 | 44 | |
| 5 | Sumgayit | 28 | 11 | 7 | 10 | 34 | 33 | +1 | 40 | |

Source: UEFA, Soccerway
Rules for classification: 1) Points; 2) Head-to-head points; 3) Head-to-head goal difference; 4) Head-to-head goals scored; 5) Head-to-head away goals scored (only if two teams); 6) Goal difference; 7) Goals scored.
(C) Champions

=== Azerbaijan Cup ===
| 28 November 2017 Second Round | Neftchi Baku | 5 – 0 | Zagatala | Baku |
| 17:00 AZT (UTC+4) | Segovia 8', 35', 54'; A.Krivotsyuk (yellow card) 24'; Bargas 50'; Mahmudov 59' | Report | E.Süleymanov (yellow card) 24' | Stadium: Bakcell Arena; Attendance: 300; Referee: Raad Ahmədov |

| 10 December 2017 Quarterfinal 1st leg | Zira | 1 – 0 | Neftchi Baku | Zirə |
| 16:00 AZT (UTC+4) | Mustafayev (yellow card) 40'; A.Shemonayev (yellow card) 43'; S.Guliyev (yellow card) 60'; Manga 86'; Gadze (yellow card) 88' | Report | Abışov (yellow card) 88'; Mirzabeyov (yellow card) 90+1' | Stadium: Zira Olympic Sport Complex Stadium; Attendance: 1,000; Referee: Ingilab Mammadov |

| 14 December 2017 Quarterfinal 2nd leg | Neftchi Baku | 2 – 0 (2 – 1 agg.) | Zira | Baku |
| 19:00 AZT (UTC+4) | Bargas 37'; Abbasov 45+2' | Report | | Stadium: Bakcell Arena; Referee: Fariz Yusifov |

| 12 April 2018 Semifinal 1st leg | Gabala | 1 – 2 | Neftchi Baku | Qabala |
| 18:00 AZT (UTC+4) | Ozobić (yellow card) 68'; G.Aliyev (yellow card) 88'; Joseph-Monrose 90+1' | Report | Gómez 29'; Alaskarov 45' (yellow card) 86'; R.Azizli (yellow card) 90+3' | Stadium: Gabala City Stadium; Attendance: 2,800; Referee: Ingilab Məmmədov |

| 18 April 2018 Semifinal 2nd leg | Neftchi Baku | 1 – 3 (3 – 4 agg.) | Gabala | Baku |
| 20:00 AZT (UTC+4) | Mustivar 9'; Meza (yellow card) 46'; Abışov (yellow card) 59'; Herrera (yellow card) 84' | Report | Dabo 20', 30'; Abbasov (yellow card) 38'; Joseph-Monrose (yellow card) 41'; Qurbanov (yellow card) 45'; Huseynov 60' (pen.); Ramaldanov (yellow card) 88' | Stadium: Bakcell Arena; Attendance: 6,000; Referee: Rauf Jabbarov |

== Squad statistics ==
As of match played 20 May 2018

=== Appearances and goals ===
| No. | Pos | Nat | Player | Total | | Premier League | | Azerbaijan Cup | |
| No. | Pos | Nat | Player | Apps | Goals | Apps | Goals | Apps | Goals |
|---|---|---|---|---|---|---|---|---|---|
| 1 | GK | (Azerbaijan) AZE | Salahat Aghayev | 11 | 0 | 11 | 0 | 0 | 0 |
| 2 | DF | (Azerbaijan) AZE | Ilkin Qirtimov | 8 | 0 | 5+1 | 0 | 2 | 0 |
| 5 | DF | (Azerbaijan) AZE | Anton Krivotsyuk | 30 | 0 | 25 | 0 | 5 | 0 |
| 6 | MF | (Azerbaijan) AZE | Rashad Sadiqov | 24 | 1 | 15+5 | 1 | 4 | 0 |
| 7 | MF | (Azerbaijan) AZE | Namik Alaskarov | 32 | 6 | 19+8 | 5 | 4+1 | 1 |
| 8 | MF | (Azerbaijan) AZE | Emin Mahmudov | 27 | 2 | 19+3 | 1 | 3+2 | 1 |
| 9 | FW | (Argentina) ARG | Lucas Gómez | 16 | 3 | 2+12 | 2 | 2 | 1 |
| 10 | MF | (Paraguay) PAR | David Meza | 30 | 1 | 25+1 | 1 | 4 | 0 |
| 11 | FW | (Chile) CHI | Ignacio Herrera | 33 | 8 | 24+4 | 8 | 4+1 | 0 |
| 12 | MF | (Colombia) COL | Mike Campaz | 4 | 0 | 0+3 | 0 | 0+1 | 0 |
| 15 | DF | (Azerbaijan) AZE | Ruslan Abışov | 30 | 5 | 27 | 5 | 3 | 0 |
| 17 | MF | (Azerbaijan) AZE | Rahman Hajiyev | 32 | 6 | 24+3 | 6 | 3+2 | 0 |
| 19 | MF | (Paraguay) PAR | Francisco García | 11 | 0 | 5+6 | 0 | 0 | 0 |
| 20 | MF | (Azerbaijan) AZE | Elnur Süleymanov | 1 | 0 | 0 | 0 | 0+1 | 0 |
| 21 | DF | (Azerbaijan) AZE | Mahammad Mirzabeyov | 23 | 0 | 21 | 0 | 2 | 0 |
| 22 | FW | (Azerbaijan) AZE | Mirabdulla Abbasov | 30 | 6 | 14+11 | 5 | 2+3 | 1 |
| 23 | MF | (Azerbaijan) AZE | Tarzin Jahangirov | 4 | 0 | 1+2 | 0 | 1 | 0 |
| 25 | DF | (Ukraine) UKR | Kyrylo Petrov | 26 | 1 | 24 | 1 | 2 | 0 |
| 26 | DF | (Azerbaijan) AZE | Omar Buludov | 5 | 0 | 2+1 | 0 | 1+1 | 0 |
| 93 | MF | (Haiti) HAI | Soni Mustivar | 8 | 1 | 3+3 | 0 | 2 | 1 |
| 94 | GK | (Azerbaijan) AZE | Rashad Azizli | 21 | 0 | 17 | 0 | 4 | 0 |
| 97 | MF | (Azerbaijan) AZE | Elnur Jafarov | 9 | 0 | 3+6 | 0 | 0 | 0 |
Players away on loan:
| 19 | MF | (Azerbaijan) AZE | Fahmin Muradbayli | 6 | 0 | 2+2 | 0 | 1+1 | 0 |
| 53 | GK | (Azerbaijan) AZE | Maksim Vaylo | 1 | 0 | 0 | 0 | 1 | 0 |
Players who left Neftchi Baku during the season:
| 3 | DF | (Croatia) CRO | Mateo Mužek | 3 | 0 | 1+1 | 0 | 1 | 0 |
| 9 | FW | (France) FRA | Hugo Bargas | 16 | 5 | 9+4 | 3 | 2+1 | 2 |
| 12 | FW | (Spain) ESP | Dani Segovia | 7 | 3 | 3+3 | 0 | 1 | 3 |
| 16 | DF | (Czech Republic) CZE | Pavel Dreksa | 5 | 0 | 4 | 0 | 1 | 0 |
| 27 | DF | (Azerbaijan) AZE | Magsad Isayev | 5 | 0 | 3+1 | 0 | 0+1 | 0 |

=== Goal scorers ===
| Place | Position | Nation | Number | Name | Premier League | Azerbaijan Cup | Total |
|---|---|---|---|---|---|---|---|
| 1 | FW | (Chile) | 11 | Ignacio Herrera | 8 | 0 | 8 |
| 2 | MF | (Azerbaijan) | 17 | Rahman Hajiyev | 6 | 0 | 6 |
| 2 | FW | (Azerbaijan) | 22 | Mirabdulla Abbasov | 5 | 1 | 6 |
| 2 | MF | (Azerbaijan) | 7 | Namig Alasgarov | 5 | 1 | 6 |
| 5 | DF | (Azerbaijan) | 15 | Ruslan Abışov | 5 | 0 | 5 |
| 5 | FW | (France) | 9 | Hugo Bargas | 3 | 2 | 5 |
| 7 | FW | (Argentina) | 9 | Lucas Gómez | 2 | 1 | 3 |
| 7 | FW | (Spain) | 12 | Daniel Segovia | 0 | 3 | 3 |
| 9 | MF | (Azerbaijan) | 8 | Emin Mahmudov | 1 | 1 | 2 |
| 10 | MF | (Paraguay) | 10 | David Meza | 1 | 0 | 1 |
| 10 | DF | (Ukraine) | 25 | Kyrylo Petrov | 1 | 0 | 1 |
| 10 | MF | (Azerbaijan) | 6 | Rashad Sadiqov | 1 | 0 | 1 |
| 10 | MF | (Haiti) | 93 | Soni Mustivar | 0 | 1 | 1 |
| 10 | | | | Own goal | 1 | 0 | 1 |
| | | | | TOTALS | 39 | 10 | 49 |

=== Clean sheets ===
| Place | Position | Nation | Number | Name | Premier League | Azerbaijan Cup | Total |
|---|---|---|---|---|---|---|---|
| 1 | GK | (Azerbaijan) | 94 | Rashad Azizli | 6 | 1 | 7 |
| 2 | GK | (Azerbaijan) | 1 | Səlahət Ağayev | 4 | 0 | 4 |
| 3 | GK | (Azerbaijan) | 53 | Maksim Vaylo | 0 | 1 | 1 |
| | | | | TOTALS | 10 | 2 | 12 |

=== Disciplinary record ===
| Number | Nation | Position | Name | Premier League | | Azerbaijan Cup | | Total | |
| Number | Nation | Position | Name | Yellow card | Red card | Yellow card | Red card | Yellow card | Red card |
| 1 | (Azerbaijan) | GK | Salahat Aghayev | 1 | 0 | 0 | 0 | 1 | 0 |
| 2 | (Azerbaijan) | DF | Ilkin Qirtimov | 2 | 0 | 0 | 0 | 2 | 0 |
| 5 | (Azerbaijan) | DF | Anton Krivotsyuk | 6 | 0 | 1 | 0 | 7 | 0 |
| 6 | (Azerbaijan) | MF | Rashad Sadiqov | 2 | 1 | 0 | 0 | 2 | 1 |
| 7 | (Azerbaijan) | MF | Namik Alaskarov | 3 | 0 | 1 | 0 | 4 | 0 |
| 8 | (Azerbaijan) | MF | Emin Mahmudov | 7 | 1 | 0 | 0 | 7 | 1 |
| 10 | (Paraguay) | MF | David Meza | 6 | 1 | 2 | 0 | 8 | 1 |
| 11 | (Chile) | FW | Ignacio Herrera | 3 | 0 | 1 | 0 | 4 | 0 |
| 15 | (Azerbaijan) | DF | Ruslan Abışov | 6 | 0 | 3 | 0 | 9 | 0 |
| 17 | (Azerbaijan) | MF | Rahman Hajiyev | 2 | 0 | 0 | 0 | 2 | 0 |
| 19 | (Paraguay) | MF | Francisco García | 1 | 0 | 0 | 0 | 1 | 0 |
| 21 | (Azerbaijan) | DF | Mahammad Mirzabeyov | 1 | 0 | 1 | 0 | 2 | 0 |
| 22 | (Azerbaijan) | FW | Mirabdulla Abbasov | 2 | 1 | 0 | 0 | 2 | 1 |
| 25 | (Ukraine) | DF | Kyrylo Petrov | 10 | 1 | 0 | 0 | 10 | 1 |
| 93 | (Haiti) | MF | Soni Mustivar | 1 | 0 | 0 | 0 | 1 | 0 |
| 94 | (Azerbaijan) | GK | Rashad Azizli | 0 | 0 | 1 | 0 | 1 | 0 |
Players away on loan:
| 19 | (Azerbaijan) | MF | Fahmin Muradbayli | 1 | 0 | 0 | 0 | 1 | 0 |
Players who left Neftchi Baku during the season:
| 9 | (France) | FW | Hugo Bargas | 2 | 0 | 0 | 0 | 2 | 0 |
| 16 | (Czech Republic) | DF | Pavel Dreksa | 1 | 0 | 0 | 0 | 1 | 0 |
| | | | TOTALS | 57 | 5 | 10 | 0 | 67 | 5 |
