= Frank Garcia =

Frank Garcia may refer to:

- Frank Garcia (basketball) (c. 1918–1956), American professional basketball player
- Frank Garcia (magician) (1927–1993)
- Frank Garcia (offensive lineman) (born 1972), American football offensive lineman
- Frank Garcia (paleontologist)
- Frank Garcia (punter) (born 1957), American football punter

== See also ==
- Francisco García (disambiguation)
- Frank López García (born 1995), Cuban association footballer
