= 2017–18 Azerbaijan First Division =

Azerbaijan First Division
- Season: 2017–18
- Champions: Khazar Baku
- Top goalscorer: Bahruz Teymurov (15 goals)
- Biggest home win: Sabah 5–0 Zagatala (15 October 2017); Bine 7–2 Mil-Muğan (25 November 2017); Sabah 5–0 Bine (19 March 2018); Khazar Baku 5–0 Mil-Muğan (19 March 2018)
- Biggest away win: Sabah 0–4 Mil-Muğan (17 November 2017)
- Highest scoring: Bine 7–2 Mil-Muğan (25 November 2017)
- Highest attendance: 1,100; Turan Tovuz 1–1 Qaradağ Lökbatan (12 November 2017)

The 2017–18 Azerbaijan First Division is the second-level of football in Azerbaijan. Turan Tovuz were the defending champions.

== Teams ==
Sabail was promoted from the 2016–17 season to Azerbaijan Premier League, while Shuvalan relegated to the First Division. On 25 September 2017, it was announced that Bine, Khazar Baku, and Sabah will participate in the First Division.

Shamkir, Shahdag, Sharurspor, Energetik, Bakılı, Ravan Baku and Göyazan didn't participate in this season.

Team	Location	Venue	Capacity
Ağsu	Agsu	Agsu City Stadium	3,000
Bine	Bine	Bine Stadium	600
Khazar	Khazar	Inter Arena	8,125
Mil-Muğan	Imishli	Heydar Aliyev Stadium	8,500
MOIK Baku	Baku	FC Baku Training Base	2,500
Qaradağ Lökbatan	Lökbatan	Lökbatan Olympic Sport Complex Stadium	2,500
Sabah	Baku	Bine Stadium	600
Shuvalan	Shuvalan	AZAL Arena	3,500
Turan	Tovuz	Tovuz City Stadium	6,800
Zaqatala	Zaqatala	Zaqatala City Stadium	3,500

=== Personnel and kits ===
Note: Flags indicate national team as has been defined under FIFA eligibility rules. Players may hold more than one non-FIFA nationality.

Team	Manager	Team captain	Kit manufacturer	Shirt sponsor
Ağsu	(Azerbaijan) Rufat Guliyev	(Azerbaijan) Ramil Aliyev	Joma	Vita 1000
Bine	(Azerbaijan) Ismayil Huseynov	(Azerbaijan) Elmir Mammadov	Nike	
Khazar	(Azerbaijan) Elshad Ahmadov	(Azerbaijan) Bakhtiyar Soltanov	Joma	PSG Kapital
Mil-Muğan	(Azerbaijan) Khalig Mustafayev	(Azerbaijan) Samir Babayev	Lescon	SOCAR
MOIK	(Azerbaijan) Azer Baghirov	(Azerbaijan) Orkhan Hasanov	Kappa	
Qaradağ Lökbatan	(Azerbaijan) Habib Aghayev	(Azerbaijan) Ruslan Poladov	Lescon	SOCAR
Sabah	(Azerbaijan) Arif Asadov	(Azerbaijan) Ilgar Alakbarov	Lescon	
Shuvalan	(Azerbaijan) Agil Nabiyev	(Azerbaijan) Huseyn Akhundov	Joma	Silk Way Airlines
Turan	(Azerbaijan) Asgar Abdullayev	(Azerbaijan) Natig Sahratov	Umbro	
Zaqatala	(Azerbaijan) Rustam Mammadov	(Azerbaijan) Haji Ahmadov	Joma	

== Table ==
Pos	Team	Pld	W	D	L	GF	GA	GD	Pts	Qualification or relegation
1	Khazar Baku (Note: Khazar Baku failed to get license for promotion)	27	15	5	7	40	18	+22	50	
2	Qaradağ Lökbatan	27	13	7	7	44	31	+13	46	
3	Shuvalan	27	13	6	8	30	20	+10	45	
4	MOIK Baku	27	13	5	9	40	32	+8	44	
5	Sabah (P)	27	11	7	9	41	33	+8	40	Qualification for the Azerbaijan Premier League
6	Turan Tovuz	27	11	6	10	34	33	+1	39	
7	Bine	27	10	5	12	33	36	−3	35	
8	Mil-Muğan	27	8	6	13	32	49	−17	30	
9	Ağsu	27	8	4	15	25	48	−23	28	
10	Zagatala	27	4	7	16	23	42	−19	19	

Updated to match(es) played on 11 May 2018. Source: PFL
(P) Promoted

== Season statistics ==
=== Scoring ===
- First goal of the season: Vigar Alibabayev for Mil-Muğan against Khazar Baku. (3 October 2017)

=== Top scorers ===
As of match played 11 May 2018

Rank	Player	Club	Goals
1	(Azerbaijan) Bahruz Teymurov	MOIK Baku	15
2	(Azerbaijan) Sabir Allahguliyev	Qaradağ Lökbatan	12
3	(Azerbaijan) Tural Gurbatov	Khazar Baku	11
4	(Azerbaijan) Elnur Samadov	Shuvalan	9

=== Hat-tricks ===
Player	For	Against	Result	Date	Ref.
(Iran) Shahin Baleljae	Khazar Baku	Turan Tovuz	4–0	7 October 2017	
