= Bine Stadium =

Stadium in Baku, Azerbaijan

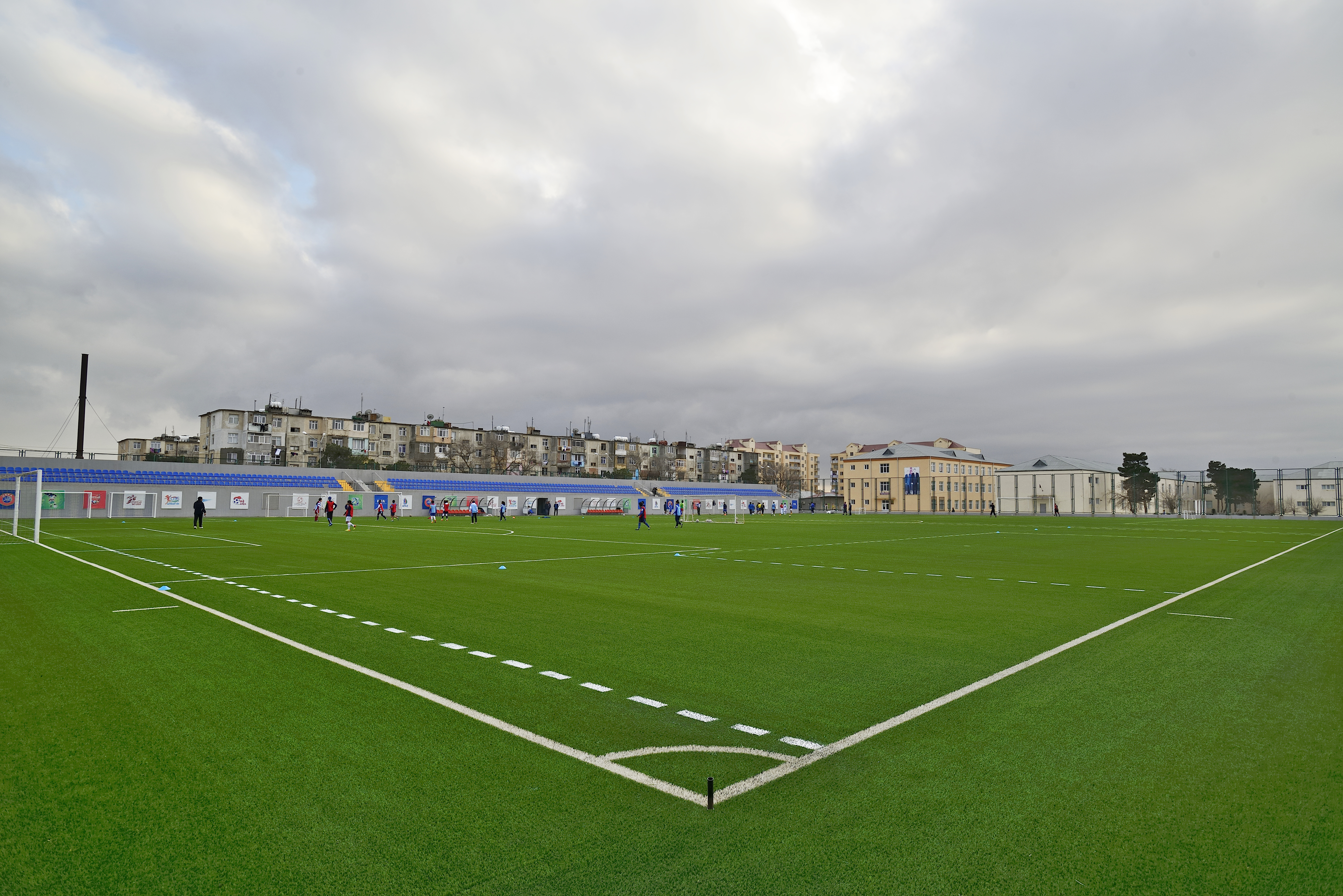
- Location: Binə, Baku, Azerbaijan
- Capacity: 579
- Surface: Artificial

Construction
- Opened: September 13, 2012

Tenants
- Bine FK; Khazar Baku FK

Bine Stadium, is a multi-use stadium in Bine settlement of Baku, Azerbaijan. It is the home stadium of Bine FK. The stadium opened in 2012 and has a capacity of 600 people.

== Events ==
The stadium was used as a training ground during 2012 FIFA U-17 Women's World Cup.

== See also ==
- List of football stadiums in Azerbaijan
