= Fran García =

Fran García may refer to:

- Fran García (footballer, born 1992), Spanish football leftback
- Fran García (footballer, born 1999), Spanish football leftback

== See also ==
- Francisco García (disambiguation)
