= Francisco Javier García =

Francisco Javier García may refer to:

- Francisco Javier García Cabeza de Vaca (born 1967), Mexican politician, governor of Tamaulipas
- Francisco Javier García Fajer ("El Españoleto", 1730–1809), Spanish composer
- Francisco Javier García Fernández ("Javi García", born 1987), Spanish footballer
- Francisco Javier García Fernández ("Javier García (jujutsuka)", born 1974), Spanish martial artist
- Francisco Javier García Fernández (Spanish politician), elected to the Senate for Cádiz in 2023
- Francisco Javier García Gaztelu ("Txapote", born 1966), Basque separatist with ETA
- Francisco Javier García Guerrero ("Javi Guerrero", born 1976), Spanish footballer
- Francisco Javier García Pimienta ("García Pimienta", born 1974), Spanish football player and manager
- Francisco Javier García Quezada ("Francisco García (footballer, born 1991)"), Paraguayan footballer
- Francisco Javier García Verdugo Garrido ("García Verdugo", 1934–2017), Spanish football player and manager
