= Francisco García Tortosa =

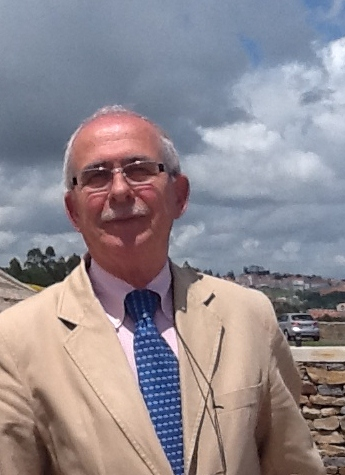
- Francisco García Tortosa in Santiago de Compostela, Cidade da Cultura, July 2012.
- Born: 15 September 1937; Murcia, Spain
- Died: 18 May 2024 (aged 86); Tomares, Seville, Spain
- Education: University of Salamanca
- Occupations: Academic, literary critic, translator
- Era: 20th–21st century
- Known for: Spanish editions and translations of James Joyce's Ulysses and Finnegans Wake
- Notable work: Annotated Spanish edition of Ulysses (Cátedra, 1999); translation of Anna Livia Plurabelle (1992)

Francisco García Tortosa (15 September 1937 – 18 May 2024) was a Spanish University Professor, literary critic, and translator into Spanish. In Spain García Tortosa is considered one of the chief experts on the figure and work of the Irish writer, James Joyce, whose creations he has translated and about which he has published a wide range of studies. The Irish hispanist, Ian Gibson, has called García Tortosa «Spain's leading expert on Joyce», while considering his translation of Ulysses, in collaboration with María Luisa Venegas, as «prodigious».

== Biography ==
His primary school in La Ñora, Murcia, was located in a barrack hut which had been used as an Air Force outpost during the Spanish Civil War. The school was run by the Jesuits who occupied the town's Monasterio de los Jerónimos (Monastery of Saint Jerome). He studied as a high school pupil in the town of Cehegín and in Murcia's "Alfonso X el Sabio" High.

Subsequently, he studied at the University of Salamanca, being awarded his Degree in Modern Philology in 1965. In 1970 he obtained his Ph.D. under the tutorship of Carlos Clavería Lizana, Member of the Real Academia Española de la Lengua, while it was in Salamanca that García Tortosa defended his Doctoral Thesis entitled Los viajes imaginarios en el siglo XVIII inglés y su fondo cultural (Imaginary Journeys in the English Eighteenth Century and their Cultural Background). His research work, between 1964 and 1968, was undertaken in the Reading Room of the British Museum, later to become the British Library, and the results were published in book form by the Publications Service of the University of Salamanca.

Also between 1964 and 1968 he was Reader in Spanish at Kingston College, London, and at the University of Leeds.

He was Full-Tenure Lecturer and Professor at the University of Santiago de Compostela between 1973 and 1976, and Professor at the University of Sevilla between 1976 and 2008, where subsequently he became Professor Emeritus between 2008 and 2011.

A large number of his publications up until 2002, at least those related to Joyce, are listed in the book edited by Alberto Lázaro and Antonio R. de Toro Santos, entitled James Joyce in Spain, A Critical Bibliography, 1972-2002 (Publications Service, University of La Coruña, 2002).

He has given key lectures and taught Courses in most of Spain's universities, as well as in institutions such as the Juan March Foundation and the City of Culture of Galicia, in Santiago de Compostela. European universities and institutions in which he has given key lectures and Courses include University College, Dublin, the James Joyce Centre, Dublin, as well as others in Antwerp, Zürich, Monaco, etc. In the United States he has lectured in the University of North Carolina, Oregon University, and Northwestern University, at Evanston, Chicago, amongst others.

During his career, Professor García Tortosa has supervised 32 Ph.D. Theses, many of them dealing with Joyce. He has also held the following posts: Secretary of the Faculty of Philology at the University of Santiago de Compostela, Director of the University of Sevilla's Institute of Languages, Dean of the Faculty of Philology at the University of Sevilla. Likewise he was Founder and Treasurer of the Spanish Association of Anglo-American Studies, as well as co-founder and director of the journal Philologia Hispalensis. In 1992 he founded the Spanish James Joyce Society, of which he is life-time President, and, in 1993, the Association's journal, Papers on Joyce, was also founded by him, acting in collaboration with other academic professionals belonging to Spanish universities.

Moreover, he has been guest writer in the cultural supplements of newspapers such as El País, El Mundo, and ABC.

García Tortosa was divorced and has three children.

Tortosa died in Sevilla, on 18 May 2024, at the age of 86.

== Works ==
There are three main strands which run through García Tortosa's professional work: his lecturing and teaching, his literary criticism, and his work as a translator. Both the latter are largely centred on the figure and works of James Joyce, as well as on Joyce's relations with Spain. In this regard, Rafael I. García-León, co-editor of the webpage Iberjoyce, writing in the issue of the journal Papers on Joyce published in honour of García Tortosa (Festschrift) wrote the following: «Next, we find Francisco García Tortosa's article "España en Joyce". [...] Definitely [...] is a landmark in the study of the influence of Spain in Joyce's works, since he gathers the ideas and conclusions presented in former articles».

Moreover, in the words of the editors of this same issue of Papers on Joyce (Carmelo Medina Casado, Antonio Raúl de Toro Santos, Alberto Lázaro Lafuente, and Jefferey Simons), García Tortosa «has been a pioneer of English studies in Spain for more than four decades; he has worked as hard as everyone to establish and strengthen these studies in our country». «It is, however, in postgraduate and Ph. D. studies that his work has left its most impressive legacy».

As far as his dedication to Joyce is concerned: «In the narrower ambit of our field of study, Joyce's studies in Spain cannot be understood without reference to García Tortosa. [...] he has been a seminal influence in the field».

Finally, García Tortosa «[...] was the first to see the significance of genetic criticism to translation. [...] His translations of Ulysses and "Anna Livia Plurabelle" make it possible for Joyce's works to reach the Spanish-speaking literary circle, as well as readers in general».

Meanwhile, Javier Aparicio Maydeu, Professor at Pompeu Fabra University, on the edition of Ulysses, undertaken by García Tortosa, and issued by the publishing house Cátedra: «It is irrefutable that thanks to García Tortosa's rigorous edition, at last an accessible and affordable Ulysses, commented on with finesse and well contextualized, is available to Spanish readers, and thus there is no doubting that we have reasons to celebrate».

Likewise, the poet and essayist, Jenaro Talens, contrasting it with José Salas Subirat's, underlines the following regarding this translation: «Philological rigour, and a capacity to find effective solutions, is perhaps one of its key virtues, together with its keen determination to transplant the musical skeleton of the work as a whole to a language, which is Spanish, distanced as it is from the syncopated rhythm of English. It is for this reason perhaps that this translation will stand as a point of reference for a long time to come».

== García Tortosa on Joyce ==
In an interview, the scholar had this to say about the Irish writer: «The difficulty with Joyce lies in how one needs to be highly realistic. If you meet someone in the street, that person does not open himself up completely to you. Little by little, in subsequent encounters, that person will start to reveal himself. And even so he will show himself to you in a limited and contradictory way. Thus it occurs in the works of Joyce». In keeping with this, elsewhere García Tortosa maintains that the attitude the reader should adopt when faced with reading those same works needs to be similar to that which he adopts when faced with life.

Regarding the task of translating Joyce: «Translating Ulysses constitutes an out-and-out odyssey; not only do the problems that crop up need to be solved, but the translator is required to possess an encyclopaedic knowledge, not to mention a command of vocabulary related to the most varied facets of Art, Philosophy, and the Applied Sciences. Nevertheless, the greatest difficulty lies in configuring a text from which stems the same hints, echoes and ambiguities as in the original. [...] So that a translation does not betray its original source, amongst other things and to the extent it is possible, it should avoid being explicative, it ought to maintain the ambiguity and the obscure passages just as they are found in the source text. In a novel like Ulysses the translator is continually seized by the temptation to facilitate the reading process, however, in doing so, we would be distorting the author's intentions».

Yet, in recent times, García Tortosa's main interest has been centred on Finnegans Wake, as shown by the number of publications which, over the years, he has dedicated to this controversial work, the difficulty surrounding which, the scholar himself states, is the result of how, in many ways, has to do with it being a continuation of the earlier novel; its technique «is nothing more than the natural evolution of that which was employed in the "Circe" episode in Ulysses».

== Bibliography ==
=== Books ===
- Francisco García Tortosa and J. Keates: Key to a Manual of Spanish and Portuguese Prose Composition, London: Harrap, 1970.
- Francisco García Tortosa: Viajes imaginarios en el Siglo XVIII inglés y su fondo cultural, Salamanca: Secretariado de publicaciones de la Universidad de Salamanca, 1973.
- Francisco García Tortosa and Ramón López Ortega, eds.: English Literature and the Working-Class, Sevilla: Secretariado de Publicaciones de la Universidad de Sevilla, 1980.
- Francisco García Tortosa et al., eds.: James Joyce - Actas/Proceedings, Sevilla: Secretariado de Publicaciones de la Universidad de Sevilla, 1982.
- Juan Bargalló Carreté and Francisco García Tortosa, eds.: Samuel Beckett: Palabra y Silencio, Sevilla: Centro Andaluz de Teatro, 1991.
- Francisco García Tortosa, edition, introduction and translation in collaboration: Anna Livia Plurabelle ("Finnegans Wake", I, viii), de James Joyce, Madrid: Cátedra, Letras Universales, 1992.
- Francisco García Tortosa and Antonio R. de Toro Santos, eds.: James Joyce en España-I, La Coruña: Servicio de Publicacións Universidade da Coruña, 1994.
- Francisco García Tortosa and Antonio R. de Toro Santos, eds.: James Joyce en España-II, La Coruña: Servicio de Publicacións Universidade da Coruña, 1997.
- Francisco García Tortosa, edition, introduction and translation in collaboration: Ulises, de James Joyce, Madrid: Cátedra, Letras Universales, 1999.
- Francisco García Tortosa, et al., eds.: Cine y Cultura: The 40s, Estados Unidos y Gran Bretaña, Sevilla: Minerva, 2000.
- Francisco García Tortosa, M. J. Gronow Smith and F. Oviedo Moral: Introduction: Calibrating the Culture of the Forties. Cine y Cultura, the 40s. Estados Unidos y Gran Bretaña, Sevilla: Minerva, 2000, pp. 1-33.
- JoyceSbilya: miscelánea de estudios joyceanos, Sevilla: Universidad de Sevilla. Secretariado de Publicaciones, 2011.

=== Essays in books ===
- "El 'Melonsmellonous Osculation' de Joyce" (estudio estilístico), en Actas del Primer Congreso de la asociación Española de estudios Anglo-Norteamericanos. Granada: Secretariado de Publicaciones de la Universidad de Granada, 1978, pp. 41-47.
- "Interpretación de las acotaciones de Shakespeare en Ulysses" (estudio comparativo), en James Joyce: A New Language. Actas/Proceedings del Simposio Internacional en el Centenario de James Joyce. Ed. Francisco García Tortosa, et al. Sevilla: Publicaciones de la Universidad de Sevilla, 1982, pp. 145-52.
- "Función de los hispanismos en Finnegans Wake", en Joyce en España I. Cursos, Congresos e Simposios, 10. Ed. Francisco García Tortosa y Antonio Raúl de Toro Santos. A Coruña: Universidade da Coruña, Servicio de Publicacións, 1994, pp. 113-19.
- "Las traducciones de Joyce al español", en Joyce en España I. Cursos, Congresos e Simposios, 10. Ed. Francisco García Tortosa y Antonio Raúl de Toro Santos. A Coruña: Universidade da Coruña, Servicio de Publicacións, 1994, pp. 19-29.
- "Dublín i Finnegans Wake" (estudio estilístico), en El Dublín de Joyce. Dir. Juan Insúa. Barcelona: Centre de Cultura Contemporánia de Barcelona/Destino, 1995, pp. 16-74.
- "Ulysses de James Joyce: clásico contemporáneo". I Jornadas de Estudios Ingleses. Ed. Carmelo Medina Casado y Luciano García García. Jaén: Universidad de Jaén. 1995, pp. 23-35.
- Joyce en España II. (ed. con Antonio Raúl de Toro Santos). Cursos, congresos e Simposios, 10. A Coruña: Universidade da Coruña, Servicio de Publicacions, 1997.
- "Joyce entre el modernismo y el postmodernismo", en James Joyce: límites de lo diáfano. Ed. Carmelo Medina Casado, et al. Jaén: Universidad de Jaén, 1998, pp. 231-45.
- "Traductores y traductólogos: a propósito de James Joyce", en Insights into Translation. Ed. Adolfo Luis Soto Vázquez. A Coruña: Universidade da Coruña, 1998, pp. 11-21.
- "Joyce entre el Modernismo y el Postmodernismo". Matrices del Siglo XX: Signos Precursores de la Postmodernidad. Madrid. Compañía Española de Reprografía y Servicios. 2001, pp. 267-283.
- "El Silencio de Otelo". El Inglés Como Vocación: Homenaje al Profesor Miguel Castelo Montero. La Coruña. Universidad de a Coruña. 2003, pp. 269-280.
- "Irish Landscapes". Irish Landscapes. Almería, España. Servicio de Publicaciones de la Universidad de Almería. 2003, pp. 17-31.
- "Ulysses As Translation. Silverpowdered Olivetrees": Reading Joyce in Spain. Sevilla, España. Secretariado de Publicaciones de la Universidad de Sevilla. Vol. 1. 2003, pp. 54-57.
- "España en Joyce". Joyce y España: Exposición. Madrid. Círculo de Bellas Artes. 2004, pp. 59-73.
- "A la Sombra del Irlandés". James Joyce, cien años y un día: Ulises y el "Bloomsday". Sevilla, España. Fundación José Manuel Lara. 2005, pp. 41-62.
- "A Propósito de Saramago". Towards an Understanding of the English Languaje: Past, Present and Future: Studies in Honour of Fernando Serrano. Granada, España. Universidad de Granada. 2005, pp. 237-246.
- "Notas Sobre Marxismo y Joyce". Joyceana: Literaria Hibérnica. Almería, España. Servicio de Publicaciones de la Universidad de Almería. Vol. 1. 2005, pp. 15-25.
- "Traducir a los Clásicos". Insights Into Translation VII. A Coruña. Servicio de Publicaciones de la Universidad de la Coruña. 2005, pp. 7-17.
- "Graham Greene: 'Neither Here Nor There.'". A Pleasure of Life in Words: a Festchrift for Angela Downing. Madrid, España. Universidad Complutense de Madrid. Vol. 2. 2006, pp. 483-496.
- "La hija del judío y los judíos en Ulises". Estudios Joyceanos en Gran Canaria: James Joyce "in His Palms". Madrid. Huerga y Fierro Editores, 2007, pp. 101-118.
- "Traducción del inglés y su transculturación en español". Re-escrituras de lo global. Traducción e interculturalidad. Madrid. Editorial Biblioteca Nueva. 2007, pp. 195-211.
- "Vascuence en Finnegans Wake" (I.iv, 101.02-102-17). New Perspectives on James Joyce. Ignatius Loyola, Make Haste to Help Me!. Deusto, Bilbao. Deusto University Press. 2009, pp. 79-90.
- "Vico y Vigo en Finnegans Wake: Confluencias y Ramificaciones". Vigorous Joyce. Atlantic Readings of James Joyce. Vigo, España. Servicio de Publicaciones de la Universidad de Vigo. 2010, pp. 177-188.

=== Articles in reviews ===
- "La lengua como medio de identificación de un grupo literario: 'The Angry Young Men'", Filología Moderna, 49, 1973.
- "Notas para una interpretación de la novela inglesa de finales del Siglo Dieciocho", Filología Moderna, 52-53, 1974-75.
- "Introducción al estilo neutro de Iris Murdoch", ES, Valladolid, 1976.
- "Caracterización de los distintos niveles de habla en Shelley", ES, Valladolid, 1977.
- "Lengua y marginación en Harold Pinter", Atlantis, 2, 1980.
- "España y su función simbólica en la narrativa de Ulysses". Revista Canaria de Estudios Ingleses. La Laguna, Tenerife. 8 (1984): pp. 13-31.
- "Arnold Kettle: A Literary Tribute", Anglo-American Studies, 7, 1987.
- "Divertimento filológico sobre el otoño", Estudios Ingleses de la Universidad Complutense, 2, 1994.
- "Hamlet: A Moving Target o las limitaciones de la crítica Literaria", Estudios de Cultura Británica en España, No. 1, 1994.
- "Transculturación de Joyce". Buxía. Vol. 1. Núm. 1. 2002, pp. 15-27.
- "Tracing the Origins of Spanish in Joyce: A Sourcebook for the Spanish Vocabulary in Buffalo Notebook VI. B. 23." Papers on Joyce, No. 7/8, 2001-2002 (2004).
- "The Backdrop of Translating Ulises", Papers on Joyce, No. 14, 2008.
- "On Influence and Joyce". Papers on Joyce. Núm. 15. 2009, pp. 1-16.
- "Dawn and Sundown of Anna Livia: A Genetic Approach", Papers on Joyce, No. 16, 2010.

=== Prefaces ===
- García Doncel, María: El Modelo Femenino en "Jane Eyre". Servicio de Publicaciones, Universidad de Cádiz, 1988.
- Carnero, José: James Joyce y la explosión de la palabra. Servicio de Publicaciones de la Universidad de Sevilla, 1989.

=== Other publications ===
- Francisco García Tortosa, Mª Luisa Venegas Lagüens: Ulises. Informes, Estudios, Trabajos y Dictámenes. Universidad de Sevilla, 2001.
- Antonio Calle González, Francisco García Tortosa, Miguel J. Gronow, Félix Oviedo, Mª Isabel Porcel, et al.: Exploring Film Art - Explorando el Arte Fílmico. Informes, Estudios, Trabajos y Dictámenes. Universidad de Sevilla, 2002.
- Francisco García Tortosa, Miguel J. Gronow: Notes on Film Noir. Informes, Estudios, Trabajos y Dictámenes. Universidad de Sevilla, 2002.
