= Frank Garcia (paleontologist) =

American paleontologist

- Born: New York, New York, United States
- Scientific career
- Fields: Paleontology

Frank A. Garcia is an American paleontologist who discovered more than 30 prehistoric species.

== Biography ==
Garcia was born in New York, New York. He attributes his interest in dinosaurs to visiting a library in west Tampa, Florida, and opening up a book about dinosaurs when he was eight years old. He graduated from Thomas Jefferson High School in Tampa, Florida in 1964.

In 1979, Garcia worked as chief investigator for the Smithsonian Institution, collecting prehistoric sea cows, whales, and dolphins. In June 1983, Garcia discovered of one of the biggest fossil finds in North America, uncovering a 1.5 million-year-old graveyard in what was once the bed of a prehistoric river that had attracted a wide range of animals. Fossil experts have described it as one of the most significant paleontological finds for that time period in the United States. During his fossil hunting career in Florida, Garcia discovered more than 30 previously unknown species of prehistoric creatures.

"Pursuing the wonder of discovery" is an apt tagline for Frank A. Garcia. Despite having no formal education, Garcia has become one of America's foremost paleontologists, discovering more than 30 previously unknown species (including two which were named after him). He slid down into phosphate pits with a broken leg, dug up massive prehistoric turtle bones with his dog Webster, and even went digging while recovering from back surgery.

== Personal life ==
Garcia retired from fossil hunting in Florida to move to the Black Hills in South Dakota, where he still hunts for fossils. He is a frequent collaborator with Peter Larson and Robert T. Bakker.

== See also ==
- Dinosaur renaissance
- Physiology of dinosaurs
