= Milan Đurić (footballer, born 1987) =

Serbian footballer

Personal information
- Full name: Milan Đurić
- Date of birth: 3 October 1987 (age 39)
- Place of birth: Belgrade, SFR Yugoslavia
- Height: 1.88 m (6 ft 2 in)
- Position: Attacking midfielder

Youth career
- 21. Maj
- Železnik
- Žarkovo
- BPI Pekar

Senior career*
Years	Team	Apps	(Gls)
2005–2006	BPI Pekar	31	(2)
2007–2008	Beograd	45	(3)
2009–2011	Metalurg Skopje	62	(4)
2011	Sandecja Nowy Sącz	9	(1)
2012	Radnik Bijeljina	13	(7)
2012–2015	Jagodina	78	(14)
2015–2016	Istra 1961	26	(0)
2016–2018	Zira	48	(8)
2018–2019	Vojvodina	34	(6)
2019–2020	Central Coast Mariners	23	(5)
2020	Rad	12	(1)
2021–2022	Balzan	36	(7)
2023	Javor Ivanjica	12	(0)
- * Club domestic league appearances and goals

Milan Đurić (Serbian Cyrillic: Милан Ђурић; born 3 October 1987) is a Serbian former professional footballer who played as an attacking midfielder.

== Career ==
Đurić has played with Serbian clubs BPI Pekar and Beograd in his early career. During the winter break of the 2008–09 season he moved to Macedonian First League side Metalurg Skopje.

Being the main playmaker in Metalurg, he was voted by the Football Federation of Macedonia as the best foreign player in the Macedonian First League for the year 2010. In season 2010-2011 Metalurg won Macedonian Cup, finished runners-up in the league, and played qualifications for UEFA Europa League.

In summer 2011 he moved to Poland and started playing for Sandecja Nowy Sącz, but at the beginning of season's second half, he changed club and became a member of Radnik Bijeljina. A few months later Radnik won the First League of the Republika Srpska and Milan Djurić was named the best player.

In summer 2012 he returned to Serbia, this time by joining top-league side Jagodina. He helped Jagodina win the 2012–13 Serbian Cup by scoring the only goal in the Final against Vojvodina.

After three years in Jagodina, he moved abroad again in the summer of 2015, joining the Croatian side Istra 1961.

On 25 June 2016, Đurić signed a two-year contract with Zira.

On 16 June 2018, Đurić returned to Serbia, signing with Vojvodina.

On 8 August 2019, Đurić was announced as a new signing of A-League team Central Coast Mariners. He left the Mariners at the end of the 2019–20 A-League in September 2020. He was the top scorer in his season at the Mariners.

== Honours ==
Metalurg Skopje

- Macedonian Cup: 2010–11

Radnik Bijeljina

- First League of the Republika Srpska: 2011–12

Jagodina

- Serbian Cup: 2012–13

Individual

- Macedonian First League Best Foreign Player: 2009–10
- First League of the Republika Srpska Best Player: 2011–12
