= Francisco García (footballer, born 1990) =

Salvadoran footballer

Personal information
- Full name: Francisco René García Peña
- Date of birth: 4 September 1990 (age 36)
- Place of birth: San Salvador, El Salvador
- Height: 1.70 m (5 ft 7 in)
- Position: Defender

Senior career*
Years	Team	Apps	(Gls)
2010–2016	Atlético Marte	110	(2)
2016	Sonsonate	0	(0)
2019	El Farolito	9	(0)

International career
2011	El Salvador U23	1	(0)
2014	El Salvador	2	(0)
- * Club domestic league appearances and goals as of 11:04, 27 August 2020 (UTC)

Francisco René García Peña (born 4 September 1990) is a Salvadoran footballer who plays as a defender.

== Club career ==
García started his career with Atlético Marte of the Salvadoran Primera División. He participated in league fixtures for the club from 2010, making 110 appearances from the 2011–12 season up until 2015–16 while also netting two goals, against FAS in 2013 and Águila in 2014, respectively. Atlético Marte were relegated to Segunda División de El Salvador at the conclusion of 2015–16, though García was released halfway through in January 2016 after disciplinary issues. He subsequently joined Sonsonate but was unable to feature because of contractual disagreements between the two clubs.

In 2019, García headed to the United States with National Premier Soccer League side El Farolito. He appeared nine times in the Golden Gate Conference while also appearing in the U.S. Open Cup in games against Academica SC and Fresno FC.

== International career ==
García represented El Salvador at U23 and senior level. He won one cap for the former, it arrived in a 2012 CONCACAF Men's Pre-Olympic Tournament qualifier against Panama. In October 2014, García was called up to Albert Roca's first-team squad for friendlies with Colombia and Ecuador in the United States. He was substituted on in place of Alexander Mendoza during the match with Colombia at Red Bull Arena. He won his second cap a month later versus Panama at the Estadio Cuscatlán.

== Career statistics ==
=== Club ===
As of 27 August 2020.

Club statistics
Club	Season	League			Cup		Continental		Other		Total	
Club	Season	Division	Apps	Goals	Apps	Goals	Apps	Goals	Apps	Goals	Apps	Goals
Atlético Marte	2011–12	Primera División	29	0	—		—		0	0	29	0
Atlético Marte	2012–13	Primera División	28	1	—		—		0	0	28	1
Atlético Marte	2013–14	Primera División	13	0	—		—		0	0	13	0
Atlético Marte	2014–15	Primera División	26	1	—		—		0	0	26	1
Atlético Marte	2015–16	Primera División	14	0	—		—		0	0	14	0
Atlético Marte	Total		110	2	—		—		0	0	110	2
Sonsonate	2015–16	Primera División	0	0	—		—		0	0	0	0
El Farolito	2019	National Premier Soccer League	9	0	2	0	—		0	0	11	0
Career total			119	2	2	0	—		0	0	121	2

=== International ===
As of 31 December 2018

National team	Year	Apps	Goals
El Salvador	2014	2	0
Total		2	0
