= Hugo Bargas =

French professional footballer (born 1986)

Personal information
- Full name: Hugo Christophe Bargas
- Date of birth: 22 October 1986 (age 40)
- Place of birth: Le Puy-en-Velay, France
- Height: 1.82 m (6 ft 0 in)
- Position: Forward

Youth career
- All Boys

Senior career*
Years	Team	Apps	(Gls)
2007–2008	All Boys	20	(4)
2008–2011	De Graafschap	69	(22)
2009	→ Zwolle (loan)	18	(4)
2011–2012	All Boys	4	(0)
2012	Gimnàstic	5	(0)
2012–2013	Blooming	35	(15)
2013	Oriente Petrolero	15	(0)
2014	Cremonese	2	(0)
2014	Deportivo Cuenca	24	(3)
2015–2017	Blooming	28	(16)
2017–2018	Neftchi Baku	26	(5)
2018	Blooming	26	(8)
2019	Deportivo Madryn	16	(6)
2019	Al-Yarmouk	0	(0)
2019	Central Norte	7	(0)
2020	CD FAS	6	(1)
2021	UAI Urquiza	18	(1)
- * Club domestic league appearances and goals as of 15:00, 17 May 2024 (UTC)

Hugo Christophe Bargas (born 22 October 1986) is a French professional footballer who plays as a forward and was recently signed by Club Deportivo FAS in Primera División de Fútbol de El Salvador.

== Club career ==
Born in Le Puy-en-Velay to a French mother and an Argentine father, Bargas moved to Argentina at early age, and graduated from All Boys' youth setup. He made his senior debut on 29 September 2007, scoring the last of a 5–0 home routing over CA San Telmo in the Primera B Metropolitana.

Bargas appeared 20 times and scored four goals during the 2007–08 campaign, as his side were promoted to the Primera B Nacional. On 1 September 2008 he moved abroad, joining Eredivisie side De Graafschap.

Bargas played his first match as a professional on 14 September, coming on as a second-half substitute in a 1–0 home win against Vitesse Arnhem. After appearing only three times in the season, all from the bench, he was loaned to FC Zwolle in January 2009, until June.

Bargas subsequently returned to De Graafschap, being an undisputed starter as his side was crowned champions of 2009–10 Eerste Divisie, scoring 16 goals in the process. In July 2011 he returned to All Boys, with the club now in the Primera División.

On 22 January 2012, after appearing in only four matches, Bargas signed a six-month contract with Spanish Segunda División club Gimnàstic de Tarragona. He made his debut seven days later, replacing Fernando Morán in the 52nd minute of a 1–2 home loss against UD Almería.

On 20 April, Bargas rescinded with the Catalans, placed in the relegation zones. In June 2012 he signed a one-year deal with Bolivian side Club Blooming.

On 9 July of the following year, after being Blooming's top scorer in the campaign, Bargas joined fierce rivals Oriente Petrolero. After starting rarely he rescinded his link in January 2014, and switched teams and countries again, signing for Italian Lega Pro Prima Divisione side U.S. Cremonese.

On 19 June 2014 Bargas moved to Ecuador, joining Deportivo Cuenca. On 8 January 2015 Bargas signed a one-year contract with Blooming for his second spell with the club. On 12 August 2015 Blooming won its first Copa Cine Center thanks to two goals netted by Bargas in 4-0 victory over Wilstermann in the final game.

On 28 January 2017, Bargas signed for Neftchi Baku of the Azerbaijan Premier League. In October 2017, Bargas extended his contract with Neftchi Baku for another six-months, until the end of the 2017–18 season, however this was terminated by mutual consent on 9 January 2018.

Borges announced on 31 July 2019 that he had joined Kuwaiti club Al-Yarmouk SC. However, he announced a few weeks later that he would leave the club again due to a contractual issue. He ended up returning to Argentina and joined Central Norte on 27 August 2019.

== Honours ==
All Boys

- Primera B Metropolitana: 2007-08

De Graafschap

- Eerste Divisie: 2009-10

Blooming

- Copa Cine Center: 2015

== Personal life ==
He is the son of Argentina international footballer Ángel Bargas, who participated in the 1974 FIFA World Cup.
