= Mike Campaz =

Colombian footballer (born 1987)

Personal information
- Full name: Mike Campaz
- Date of birth: 16 November 1987 (age 38)
- Place of birth: Tumaco, Colombia
- Height: 1.77 m (5 ft 10 in)
- Position: Midfielder

Team information
- Current team: Alianza Panama
- Number: 8

Senior career*
Years	Team	Apps	(Gls)
2006	Centauros Villavicencio	4	(0)
2007	Independiente Santa Fe	5	(0)
2007–2009	Tigres	60	(0)
2009–2013	Deportes Tolima	148	(5)
2014	Deportivo Pasto	34	(0)
2015	Once Caldas	7	(0)
2015	Boyacá Chicó	16	(0)
2017	UCR	14	(0)
2018	Neftchi Baku	3	(0)
2019–	Alianza Panama	15	(0)
- * Club domestic league appearances and goals as of 16:50, 2 May 2019 (UTC)

Mike Campaz (born 16 November 1987) is a Colombian footballer who plays for Alianza Panama.

== Club career ==
On 30 January 2018, Neftchi Baku announced the signing of Campaz on a one-year contract. On 24 June 2018, Campaz was demoted to the Neftchi's reserve team, along with Lucas Gómez, for the remainder of his contract.
