= Bine FK =

- Full name: Binə Futbol Klubu
- Nickname(s): Qartallar (The Eagles)
- Founded: 1997; 28 years ago
- Dissolved: 2018; 7 years ago
- Ground: Bine Stadium
- Capacity: 600
- President: Teymur Hasanli
- League: Azerbaijan First Division
- 2017–18: 7th
- Website: https://www.binefk.com/
Home colours	Away colours

Bine FK (Azerbaijani: Binə Futbol Klubu) is an Azerbaijani football club based in Baku.

== History ==
The club was founded in 1997 and participates in the Azerbaijan First Division.

== Colours ==
The club colours are red and black.

== Kit manufacturers ==
Bine's home kit is composed of red shirts, black shorts and socks. The club's kit manufacturer is Nike.

== Stadium ==
Bine Stadium is a football stadium is a multi-use stadium in Bine settlement of Baku, Azerbaijan. It is currently used as the club's home stadium and holds 600 people.

== Honours ==
- AFFA Amateur League
  - Champions (1): 2015–16

== Managers ==
- (Azerbaijan) Mehman Babayev (2016–2017)
- (Azerbaijan) Ismayil Huseynov (2018)
