= Yani Urdinov =

Footballer

Personal information
- Date of birth: 28 March 1991 (age 35)
- Place of birth: Mechelen, Belgium
- Height: 1.77 m (5 ft 10 in)
- Position: Left-back

Youth career
- –2004: Mechelen
- 2004–2007: PSV Eindhoven
- 2007–2009: Roda JC

Senior career*
Years	Team	Apps	(Gls)
2008–2010	Roda JC	0	(0)
2010–2011	Rabotnički	8	(0)
2012	Ekranas	25	(1)
2012–2013	Željezničar	27	(1)
2014	Widzew Łódź	5	(0)
2014	Shkëndija	11	(0)
2015	Flamurtari	8	(0)
2016–2017	Vysočina Jihlava	31	(2)
2017–2018	Bohemians 1905	0	(0)
2018	→ Zira (loan)	12	(0)
2018–2019	Ružomberok	18	(0)
2019–2020	Velež Mostar	11	(0)

International career
- Belgium U16
2007	Macedonia U17	6	(0)
2008	Macedonia U19	8	(0)
2009–2012	Macedonia U21	22	(2)
2012	North Macedonia	3	(0)
- * Club domestic league appearances and goals

Yani Urdinov (Macedonian: Јани Урдинов; born 28 March 1991) is a retired professional footballer who played as a left-back. Born in Belgium, he represented North Macedonia at international level.

== International career ==
Urdinov was part of the Macedonia U21 national team from 2009 to 2012. On 26 May 2012, he made his debut for the senior national team in a friendly match against Portugal in Leiria. He earned a total of three caps and his final international was an August 2012 friendly against Lithuania.

== Honours ==
Ekranas

- A Lyga: 2012

Željezničar Sarajevo

- Bosnian Premier League: 2012–13
