= Gabriel Matei =

Romanian footballer

Personal information
- Full name: Gabriel Eugen Matei
- Date of birth: 26 February 1990 (age 36)
- Place of birth: Curtea de Argeș, Romania
- Height: 1.77 m (5 ft 10 in)
- Position: Right-back

Youth career
- 2000–2008: Internațional Curtea de Argeș

Senior career*
Years	Team	Apps	(Gls)
2008–2010	Internațional	37	(0)
2010–2011	Pandurii Târgu Jiu	26	(0)
2011–2015	Steaua București	7	(0)
2015	→ Brașov (loan)	10	(0)
2015–2016	Academica Clinceni	14	(2)
2016–2017	Târgu Mureș	29	(2)
2017	Górnik Łęczna	15	(0)
2017	Zira	10	(0)
2018	Termalica Nieciecza	8	(0)
2018–2019	Concordia Chiajna	14	(0)
2019–2020	Academica Clinceni	29	(0)
2020–2021	Argeș Pitești	8	(0)
2021	Górnik Łęczna	7	(0)
2022	Astra Giurgiu	6	(0)
2022–2023	Filiași	8	(3)
2023	Câmpulung Muscel	10	(4)
2024–2025	Vedița Colonești	26	(3)

International career
2011	Romania U21	1	(0)
- * Club domestic league appearances and goals as of 12:52, 21 December 2024 (UTC)

Gabriel Eugen Matei (born 26 February 1990) is a Romanian professional footballer who plays as a right-back.

== Club career ==
=== Steaua București ===
Gabriel Matei was transferred to Steaua București for a reported transfer fee of €600,000. Pandurii Târgu Jiu will be receiving also €500,000 from a future transfer fee.

His career was marked by multiple injuries, thus he missed almost two seasons while at Steaua, having four surgeries in this period.

=== Zira ===
On 25 June 2017, Matei signed a one-year contract, with the option of a second year, with Azerbaijan Premier League club Zira FK.

=== Termalica Nieciecza ===
On 29 December 2017, Matei signed with Polish Ekstraklasa club Bruk-Bet Termalica Nieciecza.

== Career statistics ==
As of match played 20 June 2021

Appearances and goals by club, season and competition
Club	Season	League			National cup (Note: Includes Cupa României)		League cup (Note: Includes Cupa Ligii)		Europe		Other		Total	
Club	Season	Division	Apps	Goals	Apps	Goals	Apps	Goals	Apps	Goals	Apps	Goals	Apps	Goals
Internațional	2008–09	Liga II	21	0	?	?	—		—		—		21	0
Internațional	2009–10	Liga I	16	0	1	0	—		—		—		17	0
Internațional	Total		37	0	1	0	—		—		—		38	0
Pandurii Târgu Jiu	2010–11	Liga I	26	0	1	0	—		—		—		27	0
Steaua București	2011–12	Liga I	4	0	0	0	—		0	0	0	0	4	0
Steaua București	2012–13	Liga I	1	0	1	0	—		1 (Note: Appearance(s) in UEFA Europa League)	0	—		3	0
Steaua București	2013–14	Liga I	2	0	1	0	—		0	0	0	0	3	0
Steaua București	2014–15	Liga I	0	0	1	0	1	0	0	0	0	0	2	0
Steaua București	Total		7	0	3	0	1	0	1	0	0	0	12	0
FC Brașov	2014–15	Liga I	10	0	—		—		—		—		10	0
Academica Clinceni	2015–16	Liga II	14	2	1	0	—		—		—		15	2
Târgu Mureș	2015–16	Liga I	11	0	2	0	—		—		—		13	0
Târgu Mureș	2016–17	Liga I	18	2	1	0	3	0	—		—		22	2
Târgu Mureș	Total		29	2	3	0	3	0	—		—		35	2
Górnik Łęczna	2016–17	Ekstraklasa	15	0	—		—		—		—		15	0
Zira	2017–18	Azerbaijan Premier League	10	0	0	0	—		4	0	—		14	0
Bruk-Bet Termalica Nieciecza	2017–18	Ekstraklasa	8	0	—		—		—		—		8	0
Concordia Chiajna	2018–19	Liga I	14	0	0	0	—		—		—		14	0
Academica Clinceni	2019–20	Liga I	29	0	1	0	—		—		—		30	0
Arges Pitesti	2020–21	Liga I	8	0	0	0	—		—		—		8	0
Górnik Łęczna	2020–21	I liga	5	0	—		—		—		2 (Note: Appearances in I liga promotion play-offs)	0	7	0
Career total			212	4	10	0	4	0	5	0	2	0	233	4

== Honours ==
Steaua București

- Liga I: 2012–13, 2013–14
- Cupa României: 2014–15
- Supercupa României: 2013
- Cupa Ligii: 2014–15
