= Khazar Baku FK =

Azerbaijani football club

- Full name: Xəzər Futbol Klubu
- Founded: 2017; 8 years ago
- Dissolved: 2018; 7 years ago
- Ground: Inter Arena
- Capacity: 8,125
- President: Mahir Mammadov
- Manager: Vacant
- League: Azerbaijan First Division
- Website: http://www.xezerfk.az/
Home colours	Away colours

Khazar Baku FK (Azerbaijani: Xəzər Futbol Klubu) is an Azerbaijani football club based in Khazar raion, Baku.

== History ==
The club was founded in 2017 and participates in the Azerbaijan First Division.

== Colours ==
The colours of the club are white and blue.

== Current squad ==
As of 17 February 2018

Note: Flags indicate national team as defined under FIFA eligibility rules; some limited exceptions apply. Players may hold more than one non-FIFA nationality.

No.	Pos.	Nation	Player
1	GK	(Azerbaijan) AZE	Tarlan Ahmadli
2	DF	(Azerbaijan) AZE	Ulvi Ibazade
3	DF	(Azerbaijan) AZE	Nodar Mammadov
6	MF	(Azerbaijan) AZE	Vadim Abdullayev
7	FW	(Azerbaijan) AZE	Sergey Markelov
8	MF	(Azerbaijan) AZE	Farid Samadzade
9	MF	(Azerbaijan) AZE	Aslan Huseynov
10	FW	(Ukraine) UKR	Ramil Hasanov (loan from Gabala)
11	MF	(Azerbaijan) AZE	Elmir Rahimzade

No.	Pos.	Nation	Player
15	DF	(Azerbaijan) AZE	Kanan Mirzaliyev
16	DF	(Azerbaijan) AZE	Kanan Guliyev
19	FW	(Azerbaijan) AZE	Aydin Gasimov
20	MF	(Azerbaijan) AZE	Tanriverdi Maharramli (loan from Sabail)
22	DF	(Azerbaijan) AZE	Mushfig Teymurov
23	MF	(Azerbaijan) AZE	Isa Jabiyev
30	GK	(Azerbaijan) AZE	Namaz Ismayilov
77	MF	(Azerbaijan) AZE	Fuad Mammadzade
90	GK	(Azerbaijan) AZE	Anar Maharramov

== Managers ==
- (Azerbaijan) Rovshan Gasimov (2017)
- (Azerbaijan) Elshad Ahmadov (2018)

== Honours ==
- Azerbaijan First Division

Winners (1): 2017–18
