= Francisco García (footballer, born 1991) =

Paraguayan footballer

Personal information
- Full name: Francisco Javier García Quezada
- Date of birth: 4 April 1991 (age 35)
- Place of birth: Paraguay
- Height: 1.72 m (5 ft 8 in)
- Position: Midfielder

Team information
- Current team: Bangu

Youth career
- Cerro Porteño

Senior career*
Years	Team	Apps	(Gls)
2011	Cerro Porteño	8	(1)
2012	Independiente	33	(5)
2013	Sportivo Luqueño	13	(3)
2013–2018	Cerro Porteño	6	(0)
2014	→ Deportivo Capiatá (loan)	11	(2)
2015–2016	→ Atlético Huila (loan)	26	(2)
2016–2017	→ Nacional (loan)	24	(2)
2018	Neftchi Baku	11	(0)
2020	Bangu	0	(0)
- * Club domestic league appearances and goals as of 9 June 2018

Francisco Javier García Quezada (born 4 April 1991) is a Paraguayan footballer who last played for Neftchi Baku.

== Club career ==
On 17 January 2018, Neftchi Baku announced the signing of García on a one-year contract. On 25 June 2018, Neftchi Baku announced that they had terminated García's contract by mutual consent.

== Career statistics ==
=== Club ===
As of match played 20 May 2018

Appearances and goals by club, season and competition
Club	Season	League			National Cup		Continental		Other		Total	
Club	Season	Division	Apps	Goals	Apps	Goals	Apps	Goals	Apps	Goals	Apps	Goals
Cerro Porteño	2011	Paraguayan Primera División	8	1	-		0	0	-		8	1
Independiente	2012	Paraguayan Primera División	33	5	-		-		-		33	5
Sportivo Luqueño	2013	Paraguayan Primera División	20	3	-		-		-		20	3
Cerro Porteño	2013	Paraguayan Primera División	6	0	-		0	0	-		6	0
Cerro Porteño	2014	Paraguayan Primera División	0	0	-		0	0	-		0	0
Cerro Porteño	2015	Paraguayan Primera División	4	0	-		0	0	-		4	0
Cerro Porteño	2016	Paraguayan Primera División	0	0	-		0	0	-		0	0
Cerro Porteño	2017	Paraguayan Primera División	1	0	-		0	0	-		1	0
Cerro Porteño	Total		11	0	-	-	0	0	-	-	11	0
Deportivo Capiatá (loan)	2014	Paraguayan Primera División	11	2	-		-		-		11	2
Atlético Huila (loan)	2015	Primera A	15	2	0	0	-		-		0	0
Atlético Huila (loan)	2016	Primera A	11	0	2	0	-		-		13	0
Atlético Huila (loan)	Total		26	2	2	0	-	-	-	-	28	2
Club Nacional (loan)	2016	Paraguayan Primera División	10	2	-		-		-		10	2
Club Nacional (loan)	2017	Paraguayan Primera División	14	0	-		2	0	-		16	0
Club Nacional (loan)	Total		24	2	-	-	2	0	-	-	26	2
Neftchi Baku	2017–18	Azerbaijan Premier League	11	0	0	0	-		-		11	0
Career total			144	15	2	0	2	0	-	-	148	15
