= 2019–20 Neftçi PFK season =

Neftchi Baku
2019–20 season
- Manager: Roberto Bordin (until 18 January); Fizuli Mammedov (Caretaker) (from 18 January)
- Stadium: Bakcell Arena
- Azerbaijan Premier League: 2nd
- Azerbaijan Cup: Quarter-final (vs. Sumgayit)
- Europa League: Third qualifying round (vs. Bnei Yehuda)
- Top goalscorer: League: Steeven Joseph-Monrose (7); All: Steeven Joseph-Monrose (10)
Home colours	Away colours	Third colours

The Neftchi Baku 2019–20 season was Neftchi Baku's 28th Azerbaijan Premier League season. Neftchi will compete Azerbaijan Premier League and in the Azerbaijan Cup and Europa League.

== Season events ==
At the end of the previous season, Petru Racu, Goran Paracki and Mahammad Mirzabeyov were all released by the club.

On 1 June, Salahat Aghayev signed a new two-year contract with Neftçi.

On 4 June, Neftçi announced their first signing of the summer, Vojislav Stanković signing a two-year contract on a free transfer from Gabala.

On 10 June, Neftçi released Ruslan Abışov from his contract by mutual consent, and announced the signing of Rauf Aliyev on a one-year contract from Gabala.

On 12 June, Neftçi released Gianluca Sansone from his contract by mutual consent.

On 14 June, Dário returned to Neftçi, signing a two-year contract from Daegu.

On 16 June, Steeven Joseph-Monrose signed for Neftçi on a two-year contract after his Gabala FK contract had expired on 4 June.

On 20 June, Mirabdulla Abbasov signed a new contract with Neftçi until the end of the summer of 2021, and simultaneously joined Sabail on loan for the 2019–20 season.

On 6 July, Namik Alaskarov and Rahman Hajiyev extended their contracts until the summer of 2021.

On 15 July, Kwame Karikari left Neftçi by mutual consent.

On 5 September, Wilde-Donald Guerrier signed a one-year contract with Neftçi.

On 2 January, Neftçi announced the signing of Ibrahim Aliyev from Sumgayit, with Rauf Aliyev being released on 8 January. On 10 January, Saman Nariman Jahan signed for Neftçi from Machine Sazi

On 18 January, Roberto Bordin was sacked as manager, with Fizuli Mammedov being placed in temporary charge.

On 13 March 2020, the Azerbaijan Premier League was postponed due to the COVID-19 pandemic.

On 1 June 2020, Neftçi announced that Anton Krivotsyuk had signed a new one-year contract with the club, whilst Wilde-Donald Guerrier had left the club after his contract expired. Also on 1 June 2020, Emin Mahmudov extended his contract with Neftçi until May 2023, with Omar Buludov extended his contract with Neftçi until May 2021, and Kamran Ibrahimov extended his contract with Neftçi until May 2022 on 3 June.

On 19 June 2020, the AFFA announced that the 2019–20 season had been officially ended without the resumption of the remains matches due to the escalating situation of the COVID-19 pandemic in Azerbaijan, whilst Tural Akhundov and Soni Mustivar left the club after their contracts expired. The following day Neftçi also announced that Vangelis Platellas was leaving the club after his contract had expired.

== Squad ==
As of match played 7 March 2020

No.	Name	Nationality	Position	Date of birth (age)	Signed from	Signed in	Contract ends	Apps.	Goals
Goalkeepers
1	Salahat Aghayev	(Azerbaijan)	GK	4 January 1991 (aged 29)	Inter Baku	2017	2021	67	0
12	Kamran Ibrahimov	(Azerbaijan)	GK	7 June 1999 (aged 21)	Academy	2015	2022	0	0
30	Agil Mammadov	(Azerbaijan)	GK	1 May 1989 (aged 31)	Gabala	2019	2020	57	0
Defenders
3	Mamadou Mbodj	(Senegal)	DF	12 March 1993 (aged 27)	Žalgiris	2019	2021	27	7
5	Anton Krivotsyuk	(Azerbaijan)	DF	20 August 1998 (aged 21)	Academy	2016	2020	80	7
6	Vojislav Stanković	(Serbia)	DF	22 September 1987 (aged 32)	Gabala	2019	2021	22	0
18	Tural Akhundov	(Azerbaijan)	DF	1 August 1988 (aged 31)	Sumgayit	2018		41	1
26	Omar Buludov	(Azerbaijan)	DF	15 December 1998 (aged 21)	Academy	2016	2021	50	2
40	Vugar Hasanov	(Azerbaijan)	DF	5 December 1997 (aged 22)	Keşla	2019		0	0
51	Elchin Asadov	(Azerbaijan)	DF	3 August 1999 (aged 20)	Academy	2016		0	0
70	Əli Şirinov	(Azerbaijan)	DF	9 August 1998 (aged 21)	Academy	2017		4	0
80	İsmayıl Zülfüqarlı	(Azerbaijan)	DF	16 April 2001 (aged 19)	Academy	2019		5	1
	Elvin Sarkarov	(Azerbaijan)	DF	24 February 1997 (aged 23)	Academy	2016		6	0
Midfielders
7	Namik Alaskarov	(Azerbaijan)	MF	3 February 1995 (aged 25)	Qarabağ	2017	2021	94	12
8	Emin Mahmudov	(Azerbaijan)	MF	27 April 1992 (aged 28)	Boavista	2017	2023	80	17
11	Vangelis Platellas	(Greece)	MF	1 December 1988 (aged 31)	OFI Crete	2019	2020	32	3
17	Rahman Hajiyev	(Azerbaijan)	MF	25 July 1993 (aged 26)	Baku	2014	2021	166	16
20	Elnur Suleymanov	(Azerbaijan)	MF	17 September 1996 (aged 23)	Shuvalan	2017		1	0
33	Turan Valizada	(Azerbaijan)	MF	1 January 2001 (aged 19)	Fenerbahçe	2019	2021	2	0
36	Mamadou Kane	(Guinea)	MF	22 January 1997 (aged 23)	Kaloum Star	2019	2021	32	0
88	Saman Nariman Jahan	(Iran)	MF	18 April 1991 (aged 29)	Machine Sazi	2020	2021	6	1
93	Soni Mustivar	(Haiti)	MF	12 February 1990 (aged 30)	Sporting Kansas City	2018	2020	56	3
	Fahmin Muradbayli	(Azerbaijan)	MF	16 March 1996 (aged 24)	Academy	2013		73	6
Forwards
9	Bagaliy Dabo	(France)	FW	27 July 1988 (aged 31)	Gabala	2018	2020	49	23
10	Dário	(Brazil)	FW	11 September 1991 (aged 28)	Daegu	2019	2021	42	7
22	Mirabdulla Abbasov	(Azerbaijan)	FW	27 April 1995 (aged 25)	Sumgayit	2017	2021	69	14
28	Steeven Joseph-Monrose	(France)	FW	20 July 1990 (aged 29)	Gabala	2019	2021	27	10
55	Ibrahim Aliyev	(Azerbaijan)	FW	17 July 1999 (aged 20)	Sumgayit	2020	2022	0	0
Out on loan
Left during the season
19	Rauf Aliyev	(Azerbaijan)	FW	12 February 1989 (aged 31)	Gabala	2019	2021	28	2
25	Kyrylo Petrov	(Ukraine)	DF	22 June 1990 (aged 29)	Olimpik Donetsk	2017	2020	79	1
77	Wilde-Donald Guerrier	(Haiti)	MF	31 March 1989 (aged 31)	Qarabağ	2019	2020	14	1
	Kwame Karikari	(Ghana)	FW	21 January 1992 (aged 28)	Al-Arabi	2018	2020	10	2

=== Left club during season ===
Note: Flags indicate national team as defined under FIFA eligibility rules; some limited exceptions apply. Players may hold more than one non-FIFA nationality.

No.	Pos.	Nation	Player
19	FW	AZE	Rauf Aliyev (to Sabail)
25	DF	UKR	Kyrylo Petrov (to Kolos Kovalivka)

No.	Pos.	Nation	Player
77	MF	HAI	Wilde-Donald Guerrier
—	FW	GHA	Kwame Karikari (to Dinamo Tbilisi)

== Transfers ==
=== In ===
Date	Position	Nationality	Name	From	Fee	Ref.
4 June 2019	DF	(Serbia)	Vojislav Stanković	Gabala	Free	
10 June 2019	FW	(Azerbaijan)	Rauf Aliyev	Gabala	Free	
14 June 2019	FW	(Brazil)	Dário	Daegu	Free	
16 June 2019	FW	(France)	Steeven Joseph-Monrose	Gabala	Free	
5 September 2019	MF	(Haiti)	Wilde-Donald Guerrier	Qarabağ	Free	
2 January 2020	FW	(Azerbaijan)	Ibrahim Aliyev	Sumgayit	Undisclosed	
10 January 2020	MF	(Iran)	Saman Nariman Jahan	Machine Sazi	Undisclosed	

=== Out ===
Date	Position	Nationality	Name	To	Fee	Ref.
18 July 2019	MF	(Azerbaijan)	Ali Shirinov	Daugavpils	Undisclosed	

=== Loans out ===
Date from	Position	Nationality	Name	To	Date to	Ref.
20 June 2019	FW	(Azerbaijan)	Mirabdulla Abbasov	Sabail	7 January 2020	

=== Released ===
Date	Position	Nationality	Name	Joined	Date
10 June 2019	DF	(Azerbaijan)	Ruslan Abışov	Sabah	13 June 2019
12 June 2019	FW	(Italy)	Gianluca Sansone	Audace Cerignola	11 October 2019
16 July 2019	FW	(Ghana)	Kwame Karikari	Dinamo Tbilisi	15 July 2019
8 January 2020	FW	(Azerbaijan)	Rauf Aliyev	Sabail	11 January 2020
13 January 2020	DF	(Ukraine)	Kyrylo Petrov	Kolos Kovalivka	
1 June 2020	MF	(Haiti)	Wilde-Donald Guerrier	Qarabağ	2 July 2020
19 June 2020	DF	(Azerbaijan)	Tural Akhundov	Keşla	22 June 2020
19 June 2020	MF	(Haiti)	Soni Mustivar	Hermannstadt	26 August 2020
20 June 2020	MF	(Greece)	Vangelis Platellas	AE Larissa	20 August 2020
30 June 2020	FW	(France)	Bagaliy Dabo	Apollon Limassol	3 July 2020

=== Trial ===
Date from	Date to	Position	Nationality	Name	Last club	Ref.
January 2020		FW	(Guinea)	Badara Sylla	Aswan	

== Friendlies ==
20 June 2019	Neftçi (Azerbaijan)	3 – 1	(Russia) SKA-Khabarovsk	Düzce Province, Turkey
AZT (UTC+4)	Alaskarov 22'; Hajiyev 28'; Mahmudov 45'	Report	75'	Stadium: Fenerbahce Topuk Plateau Resort and Sport

25 June 2019	Neftçi (Azerbaijan)	Cancelled	(Romania) Politehnica Iași	Düzce Province, Turkey
19:00 AZT (UTC+4)		Report		Stadium: Fenerbahce Topuk Plateau Resort and Sport
Note: Match cancelled after 11 minutes.

30 June 2019	Neftçi (Azerbaijan)	2 – 3	(Ukraine) Vorskla Poltava	Düzce Province, Turkey
AZT (UTC+4)	Platellas 29'; Dário 33'	Report	9'; 72'; 90+2' (pen.)	Stadium: Fenerbahce Topuk Plateau Resort and Sport

15 January 2020	Neftçi (Azerbaijan)	0 – 4	(Poland) ŁKS Łódź	Gündoğdu, Turkey
AZT (UTC+4)		Report	Corral 7', 38'; Saidak 60'; Sekulski 72' (pen.)

20 January 2020	Neftçi (Azerbaijan)	1 – 2	(Ukraine) Dynamo Kyiv	Gündoğdu, Turkey
AZT (UTC+4)	Platellas 69'	Report	Mykolenko 12'; Rusyn 19'

24 January 2020	Neftçi (Azerbaijan)	1 – 2	(Ukraine) Desna Chernihiv	Antalya, Turkey
AZT (UTC+4)	Joseph-Monrose 66'	Report	Goal	Stadium: Emir Hotels Sports Kompleksi

9 June 2020	Neftçi	3 – 1	Keşla	Baku
18:00 AZT (UTC+4)	Mahmudov 10' (pen.), 12'; Hajiyev 90+2'	Report	Christovão 65'	Stadium: Eighth Kilometer District Stadium

14 June 2020	Neftçi	2 – 1	Gabala	Baku
20:00 AZT (UTC+4)	Abbasov 41'; Dário 63'	Report	R.Muradov 26'	Stadium: Eighth Kilometer District Stadium

== Competitions ==
=== Azerbaijan Premier League ===
==== Results summary ====
Overall								Home						Away					
Pld	W	D	L	GF	GA	GD	Pts	W	D	L	GF	GA	GD	W	D	L	GF	GA	GD
20	10	7	3	33	14	+19	37	6	5	0	21	7	+14	4	2	3	12	7	+5

Last updated: 7 March 2020.
Source: See Results

==== Results by round ====
Round	1	2	3	4	5	6	7	8	9	10	11	12	13	14	15	16	17	18	19	20	21	22
Ground	H	A	H	A	H	A	H	H	A	H	A	H	A	A	H	A	H	A	H	H		
Result	D	L	W	L	D	W	W	W	W	D	L	W	D	W	D	D	W	W	D	W		
Position	5	7	4	5	6	4	3	2	2	2	3	2	3	2	2	2	2	2	2	2	2	2

Updated to match(es) played on 7 March 2020. Source: See Results
A = Away; H = Home; W = Win; D = Draw; L = Loss

==== Results ====
19 August 2019 1	Neftçi	1 – 1	Sabah	Baku
20:00 AZT (UTC+4)	Mustivar 40'; Petrov (yellow card) 47'; Aliyev (yellow card) 57'; Joseph-Monrose (yellow card) 67'	Report	A.Aghazade (yellow card) 20'; Eyyubov 33'; Khalilzade (yellow card) 54'; Taghiyev (yellow card) 88'; Bezruk (yellow card) 90+4'	Stadium: Eighth Kilometer District Stadium; Attendance: 1,500; Referee: Aliyar Ağayev

26 August 2019 2	Zira	1 – 0	Neftçi	Zirə
19:00 AZT (UTC+4)	Huseynov 27'; B.Hasanalizade (yellow card) 81'; O.Sadigli (yellow card) 90+4'	Report	Petrov (yellow card) 46'; Akhundov (yellow card) 72'	Stadium: Zira Olympic Sport Complex Stadium; Attendance: 1,000; Referee: Rahim Həsənov

1 September 2019 3	Neftçi	2 – 1	Sumgayit	Baku
19:00 AZT (UTC+4)	Krivotsyuk (yellow card) 26' (yellow-red card) 90+4'; Aghayev (yellow card) 32'; Mahmudov (yellow card) 35' (goal) 64'; Joseph-Monrose 90+3'; Mammadov (yellow card) 90+4'	Report	M.Khachayev (yellow card) 19' (yellow-red card) 82'; Sharifi 33' (pen.) (yellow card) 51'; Agayev (yellow card) 44'; Hüseynov (red card) 90+4'	Stadium: Eighth Kilometer District Stadium; Attendance: 1,000; Referee: Sabuhi Bayramov

15 September 2019 4	Qarabağ	2 – 0	Neftçi	Baku
20:30 AZT (UTC+4)	Emreli 31'; Zoubir 70'; Ailton (yellow card) 90+3'	Report	Mahmudov (yellow card) 17'; Petrov (yellow card) 90'; Aliyev (yellow card) 90+4'	Stadium: Tofiq Bahramov Republican Stadium; Attendance: 7,000; Referee: Aliyar Ağayev

22 September 2019 5	Neftçi	0 – 0	Keşla	Baku
18:30 AZT (UTC+4)	Guerrier (yellow card) 19' (yellow-red card) 35'; Kane (yellow card) 83'; Mahmudov (yellow card) 88'	Report	Meza (yellow card) 14'; S.Alkhasov (yellow card) 41'; Kamara (yellow card) 66'; Flores (yellow card) 82'	Stadium: Eighth Kilometer District Stadium; Attendance: 1,000; Referee: Ingilab Məmmədov

28 September 2019 6	Gabala	0 – 3	Neftçi	Qabala
17:00 AZT (UTC+4)	Gigauri (yellow card) 16'; A.Seydiyev (yellow card) 48'; Žunić (yellow card) 53'	Report	Mahmudov (yellow card) 14'; Akhundov 59'; Petrov (yellow card) 66'; Aliyev 73'; Joseph-Monrose 89'	Stadium: Gabala City Stadium; Attendance: 600; Referee: Kamal Umudlu

5 October 2019 7	Neftçi	2 – 1	Sabail	Baku
19:15 AZT (UTC+4)	Buludov (yellow card) 15'; Joseph-Monrose 41'; Krivotsyuk 44'; Stanković (yellow card) 61'; Aliyev (yellow card) 85'; Mammadov (yellow card) 90+3'	Report	Ramazanov (yellow card) 6' (goal) 81'; Rahimov (yellow card) 33'; Cociuc (yellow card) 51'; Essien (yellow card) 80'	Stadium: Eighth Kilometer District Stadium; Attendance: 1,200; Referee: Rauf Jabbarov

20 October 2019 8	Neftçi	3 – 0	Zira	Baku
17:00 AZT (UTC+4)	Dário 27'; Petrov (yellow card) 36'; Dabo 46'; Stanković (yellow card) 54'; Joseph-Monrose 76'; Kane (yellow card) 84'	Report	Norde (yellow card) 22'; Huseynov (yellow card) 36'; I.Muradov (yellow card) 61'; Ampuero (yellow card) 70'; Kgaswane (yellow card) 90+1'; B.Hasanalizade (yellow card) 90+3'	Stadium: Eighth Kilometer District Stadium; Attendance: 1,000; Referee: Rovan Rəcəbov

27 October 2019 9	Sumgayit	2 – 4	Neftçi	Sumqayit
17:30 AZT (UTC+4)	Sharifi 6' (pen.) (yellow card) 71'; E.Badalov (yellow card) 27'; S.Tashkin (yellow card) 51'; Sadykhov 90+3'	Report	Kane (yellow card) 4'; Mahmudov 28' (pen.), 82' (pen.); Dabo 34', 83'; Stanković (yellow card) 45+4'	Stadium: Kapital Bank Arena; Attendance: 1,500; Referee: Aliyar Ağayev

1 November 2019 10	Neftçi	0 – 0	Qarabağ	Baku
20:00 AZT (UTC+4)	Mahmudov (yellow card) 41'; Akhundov (yellow card) 68'	Report	Míchel (yellow card) 3'; Medvedev (yellow card) 8'; Mammadov (yellow card) 60'; Begović (yellow card) 90+9'	Stadium: Eighth Kilometer District Stadium; Attendance: 3,000; Referee: Ingilab Məmmədov

9 November 2019 11	Keşla	2 – 1	Neftçi	Baku
17:00 AZT (UTC+4)	T.Bayramli (yellow card) 44'; S.Alkhasov (yellow card) 45+1'; Flores 63'; Meza 82'; E.Mehdiyev (yellow card) 90+1'	Report	Kane (yellow card) 25'; Akhundov (yellow card) 32'; Dabo (yellow card) 44'; Guerrier 45'; Mahmudov (yellow card) 87'	Stadium: Bayil Arena; Attendance: 1,500; Referee: Vuqar Hasanli
Note: Match played at the Bayil Arena in Baku, instead of Keşla's regular ASK Arena in Baku.

24 November 2019 12	Neftçi	4 – 1	Gabala	Baku
17:00 AZT (UTC+4)	Mustivar 17'; Buludov 24'; Joseph-Monrose 35'; Platellas 90+1'	Report	F.Hajiyev (yellow card) 61'; Gigauri (yellow card) 67'; Ferreiroa (yellow card) 68'; Guerrier 90+5' (o.g.)	Stadium: Eighth Kilometer District Stadium; Attendance: 450; Referee: Kamal Umudlu

1 December 2019 13	Sabail	0 – 0	Neftçi	Baku
15:00 AZT (UTC+4)	Rahimov (yellow card) 73'; V.Beybalayev (yellow card) 78'	Report		Stadium: Bayil Arena; Attendance: 800; Referee: Orkhan Mammadov

8 December 2019 14	Sabah	0 – 2	Neftçi	Masazır
17:00 AZT (UTC+4)		Report	Platellas (yellow card) 38'; Krivotsyuk 45+2' (yellow card) 77'; Joseph-Monrose 90+2'	Stadium: Alinja Arena; Attendance: 2,000; Referee: Rauf Jabbarov

1 February 2020 15	Neftçi	1 – 1	Sumgayit	Baku
17:30 AZT (UTC+4)	Joseph-Monrose (yellow card) 12'; Jahan (yellow card) 30'; Stanković (red card) 41'; Krivotsyuk (yellow card) 65'; Dabo 72'	Report	Sadykhov 43'	Stadium: Eighth Kilometer District Stadium; Attendance: 850; Referee: Kamal Umudlu

8 February 2020 16	Qarabağ	0 – 0	Neftçi	Baku
20:00 AZT (UTC+4)	Romero (yellow card) 48'; Ailton (yellow card) 81'	Report	Guerrier (yellow card) 84'	Stadium: Tofiq Bahramov Republican Stadium; Attendance: 3,200; Referee: Rauf Jabbarov

16 February 2020 17	Neftçi	3 – 1	Keşla	Baku
19:00 AZT (UTC+4)	Dabo 11' (yellow card) 40'; Mbodj 18' (yellow card) 53'; Akhundov (yellow card) 30'; Mammadov (yellow card) 54'; Joseph-Monrose 59'; Kane (yellow card) 89'	Report	Meza 53' (pen.); S.Alkhasov (yellow card) 62'	Stadium: Eighth Kilometer District Stadium; Attendance: 1,800; Referee: Elcin Məsiyev

22 February 2020 18	Gabala	0 – 2	Neftçi	Qabala
15:00 AZT (UTC+4)	I.Ingilabli (yellow card) 6'; S.Guliyev (yellow card) 86'; R.Muradov (yellow card) 90+2'	Report	Krivotsyuk 8'; Dabo 14' (yellow card) 80'	Stadium: Gabala City Stadium; Attendance: 400; Referee: Aliyar Ağayev

1 March 2020 19	Neftçi	1 – 1	Sabail	Baku
17:00 AZT (UTC+4)	Akhundov (yellow card) 23'; Buludov (yellow card) 45+1'; Erico 55' (o.g.); Krivotsyuk (yellow card) 69'; Dário (yellow card) 82'	Report	Aliyev (yellow card) 16' (goal) 90+2'; Abbasov (yellow card) 67'; Ekstein (yellow card) 74'	Stadium: Eighth Kilometer District Stadium; Attendance: 1,100; Referee: Sabuhi Bayramov

7 March 2020 20	Neftçi	4 – 0	Sabah	Baku
18:00 AZT (UTC+4)	Jahan 6' (yellow card) 19'; Mahmudov (yellow card) 40'; Stanković (yellow card) 45'; Krivotsyuk 49'; Dabo 62'; Buludov (yellow card) 69'; Abbasov 90+1'	Report	J.Diniyev (yellow card) 43'	Stadium: Eighth Kilometer District Stadium; Attendance: 1,100; Referee: Ravan Həmzəzadə

21 June 2020 21	Zira	–	Neftçi	Zirə
AZT (UTC+4)				Stadium: Zira Olympic Sport Complex Stadium
Note: Match originally scheduled for 14 March, but postponed on 13 March due to the COVID-19 pandemic.

26 June 2020 22	Neftçi	–	Qarabağ	Baku
AZT (UTC+4)				Stadium: Eighth Kilometer District Stadium
Note: Match originally scheduled for 21 March, but postponed on 13 March due to the COVID-19 pandemic.

30 June 2020 23	Keşla	–	Neftçi	Baku
AZT (UTC+4)				Stadium: Bayil Arena

5 July 2020 24	Neftçi	–	Gabala	Baku
AZT (UTC+4)				Stadium: Eighth Kilometer District Stadium

9 July 2020 25	Sabail	–	Neftçi	Baku
AZT (UTC+4)				Stadium: Bayil Arena

17 July 2020 26	Sabah	–	Neftçi	Masazır
AZT (UTC+4)				Stadium: Alinja Arena

25 July 2020 27	Neftçi	–	Zira	Baku
AZT (UTC+4)				Stadium: Eighth Kilometer District Stadium

29 July 2020 28	Sumgayit	–	Neftçi	Sumqayit
AZT (UTC+4)				Stadium: Kapital Bank Arena

==== League table ====
Pos	Team	Pld	W	D	L	GF	GA	GD	Pts	Qualification or relegation
1	Qarabağ (C)	20	13	6	1	34	7	+27	45	Qualification for the Champions League first qualifying round
2	Neftçi Baku	20	10	7	3	33	14	+19	37	Qualification for the Europa League first qualifying round
3	Keşla	20	8	6	6	27	21	+6	30	Qualification for the Europa League first qualifying round
4	Sumgayit	20	6	5	9	24	32	−8	23	Qualification for the Europa League first qualifying round
5	Zira	20	6	5	9	25	37	−12	23	

Source: Soccerway
Rules for classification: 1) Points; 2) Head-to-head points; 3) Head-to-head goal difference; 4) Head-to-head goals scored; 5) Head-to-head away goals scored (only if two teams); 6) Goal difference; 7) Goals scored.
(C) Champions

=== Azerbaijan Cup ===
16 December 2019 Quarterfinal 1st leg	Neftçi	0 – 1	Sumgayit	Baku
18:00 AZT (UTC+4)	Kane (yellow card) 25'; Dário (yellow card) 52'; Krivotsyuk (yellow card) 90+2'	Report	Babaei (yellow card) 35'; Sadykhov 48'; Jannatov (yellow card) 87'	Stadium: Eighth Kilometer District Stadium; Attendance: 550; Referee: Elcin Masiyev

20 December 2019 Quarterfinal 2nd leg	Sumgayit	0 – 0 (1 – 0 agg.)	Neftçi	Sumqayit
17:L00 AZT (UTC+4)	E.Jafarguliyev (yellow card) 69'	Report	Buludov (yellow card) 21'; Mahmudov (yellow card) 75'; Dabo (yellow card) 82'; Mustivar (yellow card) 90+4'	Stadium: Kapital Bank Arena; Attendance: 1,500; Referee: Ravan Hamzazada

=== UEFA Europa League ===
==== Qualifying rounds ====
11 July 2019 First qualifying round 1st leg	Speranța Nisporeni (Moldova)	0 – 3	(Azerbaijan) Neftçi	Chișinău, Moldova
21:00 AZST (UTC+4)	I.Tiehi (yellow card) 16'	Report	Mahmudov 16' (pen.); Joseph-Monrose 35'; Hajiyev 76'	Stadium: Zimbru Stadium; Attendance: 1,370; Referee: Tim Marshall (Northern Ireland)
Note: Speranța Nisporeni played their home matches at Zimbru Stadium, Chișinău, instead of their regular stadium Stadionul Mircea Eliade, Nisporeni which does not meet UEFA requirements.

18 July 2019 First qualifying round 2nd leg	Neftçi (Azerbaijan)	6 – 0 (9 – 0 agg.)	(Moldova) Speranța Nisporeni	Baku, Azerbaijan
21:00 AZST (UTC+4)	Platellas 18', 40'; Mahmudov 24' (pen.); Dário 42'; Joseph-Monrose 67'; I.Zülfüqarlı 78'	Report	Ponce (yellow card) 25'; Efros (yellow card) 45+1'	Stadium: Bakcell Arena; Attendance: 6,500; Referee: Julian Weinberger (Austria)

25 July 2019 Second qualifying round 1st leg	Arsenal Tula (Russia)	0 – 1	(Azerbaijan) Neftçi	Tula, Russia
21:00 AZST (UTC+4)	Kombarov (yellow card) 81'; Tkachyov (yellow card) 90+3'	Report	Kane (yellow card) 25'; Aliyev (yellow card) 37'; Dário 45+1'; Mahmudov (yellow card) 68'; Buludov (yellow card) 79'	Stadium: Arsenal Stadium; Attendance: 16,720; Referee: Enea Jorgji (Albania)

1 August 2019 Second qualifying round 2nd leg	Neftçi (Azerbaijan)	3 – 0 (4 – 0 agg.)	(Russia) Arsenal Tula	Baku, Azerbaijan
21:00 AZST (UTC+4)	Aliyev 49'; Petrov (yellow card) 67'; Krivotsyuk (yellow card) 87'; Dário 89' (pen.); Mbodj 90+3' (yellow card) 90+4'	Report	Čaušić (yellow card) 9'; Kostadinov (yellow card) 80'; Grigalava (yellow card) 88'	Stadium: Bakcell Arena; Attendance: 9,000; Referee: Alan Mario Sant (Malta)

8 August 2019 Third qualifying round 1st leg	Neftçi (Azerbaijan)	2 – 2	(Israel) Bnei Yehuda	Baku, Azerbaijan
21:00 AZST (UTC+4)	Platellas (yellow card) 17'; Joseph-Monrose 43'; Mustivar (yellow card) 62'; Dário (yellow card) 75'; Alasgarov (yellow card) 82' (goal) 90+7'	Report	Sagas 26'; Ghadir 36'; Pnishi (yellow card) 39'; Soro (yellow card) 90'; Zubas (yellow card) 90+7'	Stadium: Bakcell Arena; Referee: Karim Abed (France)

15 August 2019 Third qualifying round 2nd leg	Bnei Yehuda (Israel)	2 – 1 (4 – 3 agg.)	(Azerbaijan) Neftçi	Petah Tikva, Israel
21:00 AZST (UTC+4)	Jan 15'; Sagas 66'	Report	Mustivar (yellow card) 18'; Mahmudov 90+3' (pen.)	Stadium: HaMoshava Stadium; Referee: Daniele Doveri (Italy)
Note: Bnei Yehuda played their home matches at HaMoshava Stadium, Petah Tikva, instead of their regular stadium Bloomfield Stadium, Tel Aviv which is undergoing renovation.

== Squad statistics ==
As of Match played 7 March 2020

=== Appearances and goals ===
No.	Pos	Nat	Player	Total		Premier League		Azerbaijan Cup		Europa League	
No.	Pos	Nat	Player	Apps	Goals	Apps	Goals	Apps	Goals	Apps	Goals
1	GK	(Azerbaijan) AZE	Salahat Aghayev	24	0	15+1	0	2	0	6	0
3	DF	(Senegal) SEN	Mamadou Mbodj	14	2	3+6	1	1	0	2+2	1
5	DF	(Azerbaijan) AZE	Anton Krivotsyuk	24	4	16	4	2	0	6	0
6	DF	(Serbia) SRB	Vojislav Stanković	22	0	16	0	2	0	4	0
7	MF	(Azerbaijan) AZE	Namik Alaskarov	24	1	11+7	0	1+1	0	0+4	1
8	MF	(Azerbaijan) AZE	Emin Mahmudov	26	6	19	3	1	0	6	3
9	FW	(France) FRA	Bagaliy Dabo	19	7	13+2	7	1+1	0	0+2	0
10	FW	(Brazil) BRA	Dário	25	4	10+7	1	1+1	0	6	3
11	MF	(Greece) GRE	Vangelis Platellas	18	3	5+7	1	0+1	0	3+2	2
17	MF	(Azerbaijan) AZE	Rahman Hajiyev	21	1	8+7	0	1+1	0	0+4	1
18	DF	(Azerbaijan) AZE	Tural Akhundov	14	1	12	1	2	0	0	0
22	FW	(Azerbaijan) AZE	Mirabdulla Abbasov	3	1	0+3	1	0	0	0	0
26	DF	(Azerbaijan) AZE	Omar Buludov	21	1	11+2	1	1+1	0	6	0
28	FW	(France) FRA	Steeven Joseph-Monrose	27	10	17+2	7	2	0	6	3
30	GK	(Azerbaijan) AZE	Agil Mammadov	6	0	5+1	0	0	0	0	0
33	MF	(Azerbaijan) AZE	Turan Valizada	1	0	0+1	0	0	0	0	0
36	MF	(Guinea) GUI	Mamadou Kane	23	0	16	0	2	0	5	0
80	DF	(Azerbaijan) AZE	İsmayıl Zülfüqarlı	5	1	0+3	0	0	0	0+2	1
88	MF	(Iran) IRI	Saman Nariman Jahan	6	1	6	1	0	0	0	0
93	MF	(Haiti) HAI	Soni Mustivar	21	2	10+4	2	2	0	4+1	0
Players away from Neftçi Baku on loan:
Players who left Neftçi Baku during the season:
19	FW	(Azerbaijan) AZE	Rauf Aliyev	15	2	4+5	1	0	0	6	1
25	DF	(Ukraine) UKR	Kyrylo Petrov	17	0	10+1	0	0	0	6	0
77	MF	(Haiti) HAI	Wilde-Donald Guerrier	14	1	13	1	1	0	0	0

=== Goal scorers ===
Place	Position	Nation	Number	Name	Premier League	Azerbaijan Cup	Europa League	Total
1	FW	(France)	28	Steeven Joseph-Monrose	7	0	3	10
2	FW	(France)	9	Bagaliy Dabo	7	0	0	7
3	MF	(Azerbaijan)	8	Emin Mahmudov	3	0	3	6
5	DF	(Azerbaijan)	5	Anton Krivotsyuk	4	0	0	4
5	FW	(Brazil)	10	Dário	1	0	3	4
6	MF	(Greece)	11	Vangelis Platellas	1	0	2	3
7	MF	(Haiti)	93	Soni Mustivar	2	0	0	2
7	FW	(Azerbaijan)	19	Rauf Aliyev	1	0	1	2
7	DF	(Senegal)	3	Mamadou Mbodj	1	0	1	2
10	MF	(Haiti)	77	Wilde-Donald Guerrier	1	0	0	1
10	DF	(Azerbaijan)	26	Omar Buludov	1	0	0	1
10	MF	(Iran)	88	Saman Nariman Jahan	1	0	0	1
10	FW	(Azerbaijan)	22	Mirabdulla Abbasov	1	0	0	1
10	DF	(Azerbaijan)	18	Tural Akhundov	0	0	1	1
10	MF	(Azerbaijan)	17	Rahman Hajiyev	0	0	1	1
10	DF	(Azerbaijan)	80	İsmayıl Zülfüqarlı	0	0	1	1
10	MF	(Azerbaijan)	7	Namik Alaskarov	0	0	1	1
10				Own goal	1	0	0	1
				TOTALS	33	0	16	49

=== Clean sheets ===
Place	Position	Nation	Number	Name	Premier League	Azerbaijan Cup	Europa League	Total
1	GK	(Azerbaijan)	1	Salahat Aghayev	6	1	4	11
2	GK	(Azerbaijan)	30	Agil Mammadov	3	0	0	3
				TOTALS	9	1	4	14

=== Disciplinary record ===
Number	Nation	Position	Name	Premier League		Azerbaijan Cup		Europa League		Total	
Number	Nation	Position	Name	Yellow card	Red card	Yellow card	Red card	Yellow card	Red card	Yellow card	Red card
1	(Azerbaijan)	GK	Salahat Aghayev	1	0	0	0	0	0	1	0
3	(Senegal)	DF	Mamadou Mbodj	1	0	0	0	1	0	2	0
5	(Azerbaijan)	DF	Anton Krivotsyuk	5	1	1	0	1	0	7	1
6	(Serbia)	DF	Vojislav Stanković	4	1	0	0	0	0	4	1
7	(Azerbaijan)	MF	Namik Alaskarov	0	0	0	0	1	0	1	0
8	(Azerbaijan)	MF	Emin Mahmudov	7	0	1	0	1	0	9	0
9	(France)	FW	Bagaliy Dabo	3	0	1	0	0	0	4	0
10	(Brazil)	FW	Dário	1	0	1	0	1	0	3	0
11	(Greece)	MF	Vangelis Platellas	1	0	0	0	1	0	2	0
18	(Azerbaijan)	DF	Tural Akhundov	5	0	0	0	0	0	5	0
26	(Azerbaijan)	DF	Omar Buludov	3	0	1	0	1	0	5	0
28	(France)	FW	Steeven Joseph-Monrose	2	0	0	0	0	0	2	0
30	(Azerbaijan)	GK	Agil Mammadov	3	0	0	0	0	0	3	0
36	(Guinea)	MF	Mamadou Kane	5	0	1	0	1	0	7	0
88	(Iran)	MF	Saman Nariman Jahan	2	0	0	0	0	0	2	0
93	(Haiti)	MF	Soni Mustivar	0	0	1	0	2	0	3	0
Players who left Neftçi Baku during the season:
19	(Azerbaijan)	FW	Rauf Aliyev	3	0	0	0	1	0	4	0
25	(Ukraine)	DF	Kyrylo Petrov	5	0	0	0	1	0	6	0
77	(Haiti)	MF	Wilde-Donald Guerrier	3	1	0	0	0	0	3	1
			TOTALS	54	3	7	0	12	0	73	3
