= Hôtel de Ville, Les Pavillons-sous-Bois =

Town hall in Les Pavillons-sous-Bois, France

Hôtel de Ville
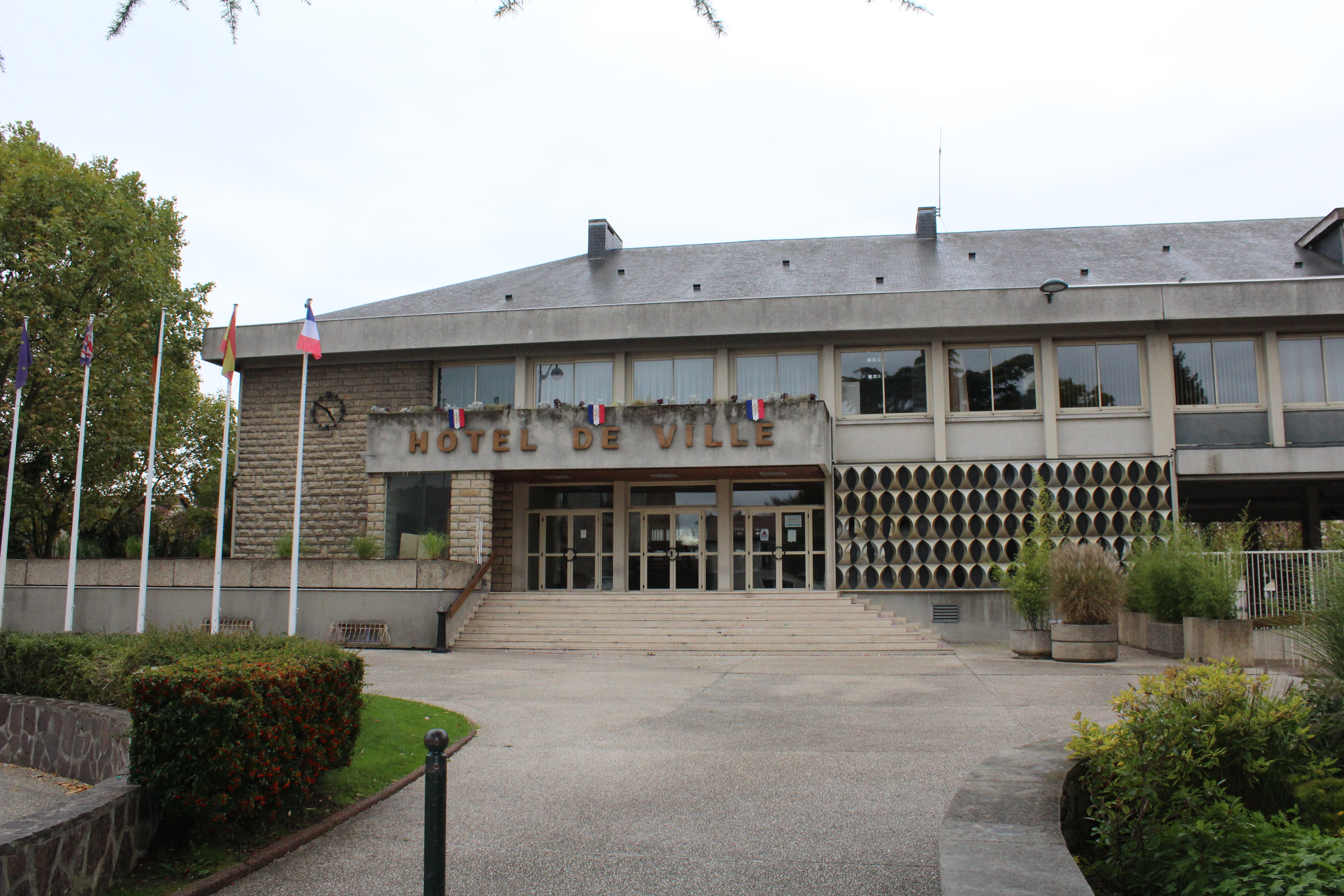
- The main frontage of the Hôtel de Ville in October 2017
- Interactive map of the Hôtel de Ville area

General information
- Type: City hall
- Architectural style: Art Deco style
- Location: Les Pavillons-sous-Bois, France
- Coordinates: 48.9030°N 2.5068°E
- Completed: c.1969

The Hôtel de Ville (French pronunciation: [otɛl də vil], City Hall) is a municipal building in Les Pavillons-sous-Bois, Seine-Saint-Denis, in the northeastern suburbs of Paris, standing on Avenue Jean-Jaurès.

== History ==
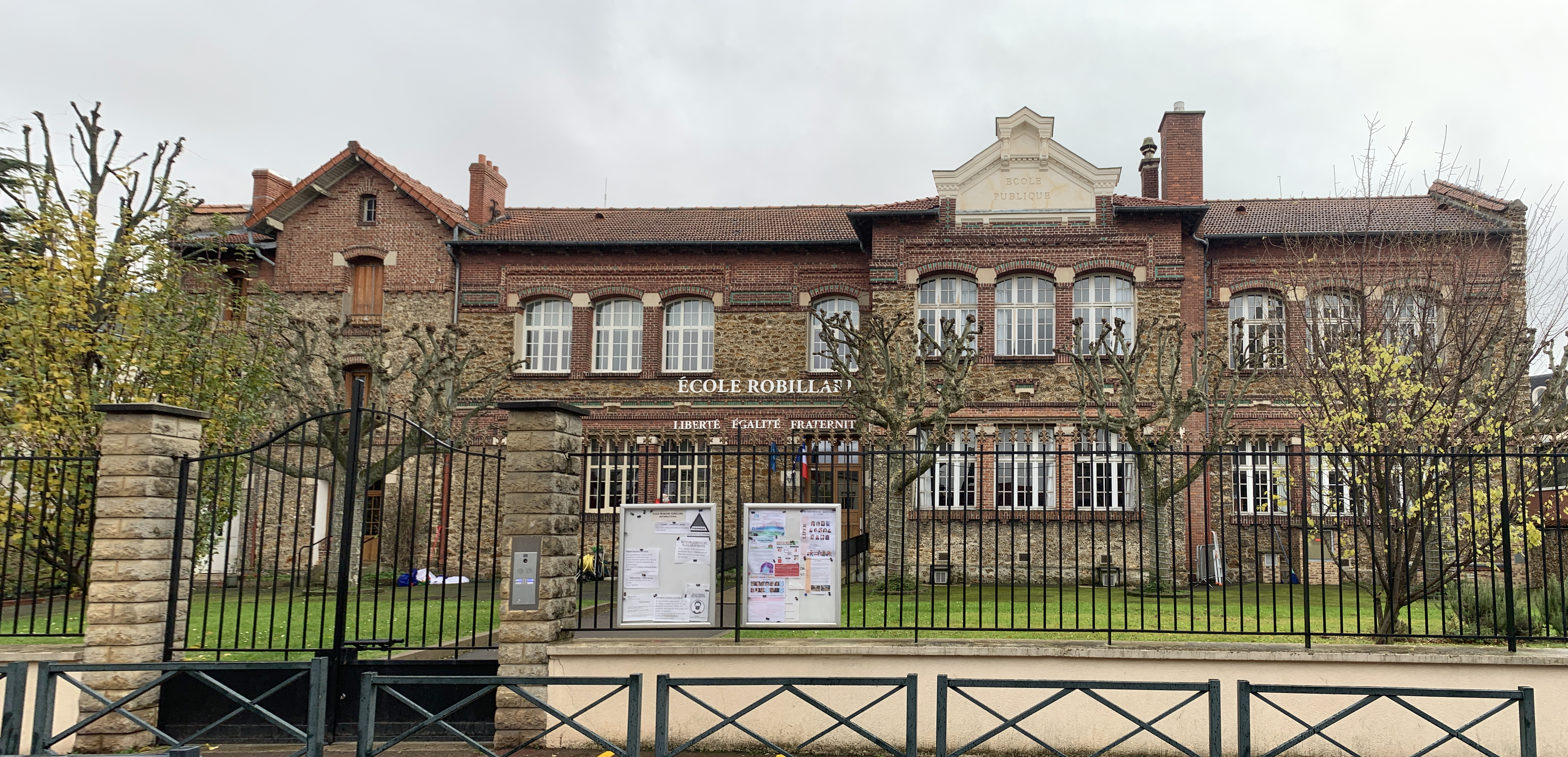
The École Robillard, which served as the first town hall

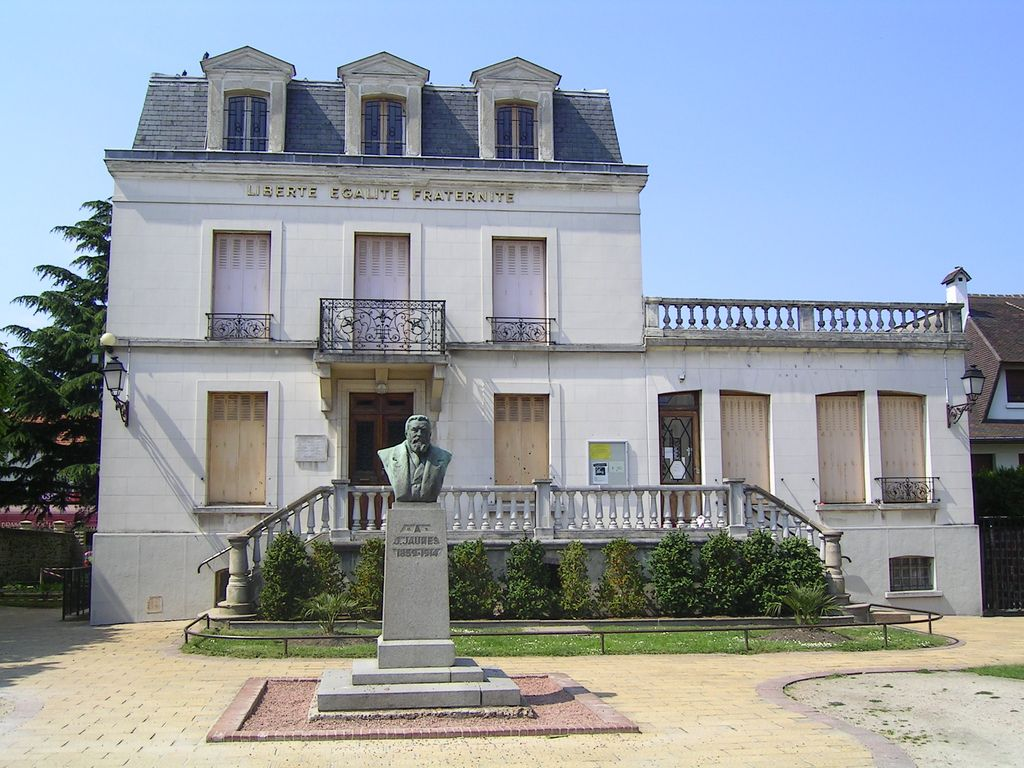
The second town hall

After Les Pavillons-sous-Bois was created by the separation of its territory from the commune of Bondy in 1905, the new town council led by the mayor, Edouart-Charles Philibert, looked for a location to hold their meetings. They initially used a room in the local girls' school, the École de la Basoche (now the École Robillard) on Allée de la Basoche (now Allée Robillard). The school had been designed in the neoclassical style, built in rubble masonry with red brick finishings at a cost of FFr 29,945 and had been completed in 1892.

The design involved an asymmetrical main frontage of 12 bays facing onto Allée de la Basoche. The main doorway was in the sixth bay on the left, although there was another door in the second bay on the left which was surmounted by a gable. The seventh, eighth and ninth bays formed a section which was projected forward and surmounted by a pediment. The building was fenestrated by segmental headed windows with red brick voussoirs.

After the First World War, the council led by the mayor, Philippe Charlot, decided to acquire a more substantial property. The building they selected was a 19th century villa on an adjacent site to the northeast of the original building. When the building was no longer required for municipal use, it was converted to serve as the local public library. A bust of the socialist politician, Jean Jaurès, on a pedestal was installed in front of the building in 1930.

In the mid-1960s, following significant population growth, the council led by the mayor, Marcel Delphien, decided to commission a modern town hall. The site they selected was on the southwest side of Avenue Jean-Jaurès. The new building was designed in the Art Deco style, built in concrete and glass and was completed in around 1969.

The design involved a long rectangular building facing onto Avenue Jean-Jaurès. The left-hand section featured a short flight of steps leading up to three glass doorways with a concrete canopy. On the right of the doorways, there was a large rectangular panel decorated by five rows of hollow oval shapes. The right-hand-section was open on the ground floor, with a series of concrete pillars supporting the first-floor structure. Internally, the principal room was the Salle des Mariages (wedding room).
