= Steeven Joseph-Monrose =

French footballer (born 1990)

Personal information
- Date of birth: 20 July 1990 (age 36)
- Place of birth: Bondy, France
- Height: 5 ft 11 in (1.80 m)
- Position: Right winger

Team information
- Current team: Saint-Pierre Milizac

Youth career
- 1995–2000: AS Bondy
- 2000–2002: CRAF Liévin
- 2002–2008: Lens

Senior career*
Years	Team	Apps	(Gls)
2008–2011	Lens	15	(0)
2010	→ Châteauroux (loan)	8	(1)
2011–2012	Kortrijk	27	(6)
2012–2015	Genk	61	(7)
2015–2017	Brest	66	(10)
2017–2019	Gabala	46	(15)
2019–2021	Neftçi	34	(9)
2021–2022	Xanthi	16	(1)
2022–2023	Gazélec Ajaccio	6	(4)
2023–	Saint-Pierre Milizac	35	(13)

International career^{‡}
2007–2008	France U18	3	(1)
2008–2009	France U19	3	(0)
2009–2011	France U20	8	(6)
2011–2012	France U21	6	(2)
- * Club domestic league appearances and goals as of 6 November 2015 ‡ National team caps and goals as of 7 September 2024

Steeven Joseph-Monrose (born 20 July 1990) is a French professional footballer who plays as a right winger for French Championnat National 3 club Saint-Pierre Milizac.

== Club career ==
Joseph-Monrose began his career playing for his local club in Bondy, AS Bondy, before moving to CRAF Liévin. He arrived at Lens in 2002. On 20 July 2008, he signed his first professional contract with the Pas-de-Calais-based side, which would keep him there until 2013. He was given the number 34 kit. He made his professional debut on 13 October 2008 in Lens' 1–0 win over Guingamp coming on as a substitute playing 20 minutes. On 11 January 2010, Lens loaned him to Châteauroux until 30 June 2010.

On 23 June 2017, Gabala announced the signing of Joseph-Monrose on a two-year contract, with Gabala confirmed his release at the end of his contract on 4 June 2019.

On 16 June 2019, Neftçi announced the signing of Joseph-Monrose on a two-year contract. On 26 June 2021, Neftçi confirmed the departure of Joseph-Monrose after they decided not to renew his contract.

== International career ==
Born in France, Joseph-Montose is of Haitian descent. Joseph-Monrose played on the France U-19 squad. On 25 May 2009, he was selected to the under-20 squad to participate in the 2009 Mediterranean Games.

== Personal life ==
Joseph-Monrose is of Haitian descent.

== Career statistics ==
=== Club ===
As of match played 19 May 2021

Appearances and goals by club, season and competition
Club	Season	League			National cup		League cup		Continental		Other		Total	
Club	Season	Division	Apps	Goals	Apps	Goals	Apps	Goals	Apps	Goals	Apps	Goals	Apps	Goals
Lens	2008–09	Ligue 2	3	0	0	0	1	0	–		–		4	0
Lens	2009–10	Ligue 1	2	0	0	0	0	0	–		–		2	0
Lens	2010–11	Ligue 1	10	0	0	0	0	0	–		–		10	0
Lens	Total		15	0	0	0	1	0	0	0	0	0	16	0
Châteauroux (loan)	2009–10	Ligue 2	8	1	0	0	0	0	–		–		8	1
Kortrijk	2011–12	Jupiler Pro League	37	8	7	3	–		–		–		44	11
Genk	2012–13	Jupiler Pro League	37	5	5	0	–		11	1	–		42	6
Genk	2013–14	Jupiler Pro League	8	1	3	0	–		1	0	0	0	11	1
Genk	2014–15	Jupiler Pro League	16	1	0	0	–		–		–		16	1
Genk	Total		61	7	8	0	0	0	0	0	0	0	69	7
Brest	2015–16	Ligue 2	29	3	1	0	1	0	–		–		31	3
Brest	2016–17	Ligue 2	37	7	2	0	2	0	–		–		41	7
Brest	Total		66	10	3	0	3	0	0	0	0	0	78	10
Gabala	2017–18	Azerbaijan Premier League	22	9	5	2	–		4	1	–		31	12
Gabala	2018–19	Azerbaijan Premier League	25	6	4	1	–		2	1	–		31	8
Gabala	Total		47	15	9	3	0	0	6	2	0	0	62	20
Neftçi	2019–20	Azerbaijan Premier League	19	7	2	0	–		6	3	–		27	10
Neftçi	2020–21	Azerbaijan Premier League	15	2	1	0	–		1	0	–		17	2
Neftçi	Total		34	9	3	0	0	0	7	3	0	0	44	12
Career total			268	50	30	6	4	0	25	6	0	0	321	62

== Honours ==
Lens

- Ligue 2: 2008–09

Genk

- Belgian Cup: 2012–13

Gabala

- Azerbaijan Cup: 2018–19

Individual

- Azerbaijan Premier League top scorer: 2019–20
