= Bagaliy Dabo =

French footballer (born 1988)

Personal information
- Date of birth: 27 July 1988 (age 38)
- Place of birth: Clichy, France
- Height: 1.80 m (5 ft 11 in)
- Position: Forward

Team information
- Current team: Ayia Napa
- Number: 99

Youth career
- 2006–2008: Lorient

Senior career*
Years	Team	Apps	(Gls)
2008–2011	Ivry	55	(16)
2011–2013	Créteil	54	(14)
2013–2014	Istres	32	(7)
2014–2016	Créteil	57	(6)
2016–2018	Gabala	43	(20)
2018–2020	Neftçi	41	(21)
2020–2023	Apollon Limassol	61	(14)
2024–	Ayia Napa	3	(0)
- * Club domestic league appearances and goals as of 10:36, 11 November 2024 (UTC)

Bagaliy Dabo (born 27 July 1988) is a French professional footballer who plays as a forward for Ayia Napa.

== Career ==
Dabo made his professional debut with FC Istres in August 2014, in a 4–2 Ligue 2 defeat against Angers.

On 29 June 2016, Dabo signed a two-year contract with Azerbaijan Premier League side Gabala FK. On 17 June 2018, Dabo signed a two-year contract with fellow Azerbaijan Premier League club Neftçi PFK.

On 3 July 2020, Apollon Limassol announced the signing of Dabo on a two-year contract.

== Personal life ==
Born in France, Dabo holds French and Senegalese nationalities.

== Career statistics ==
As of match played 4 December 2022

Appearances and goals by club, season and competition
Club	Season	League			National cup		League cup		Continental		Total	
Club	Season	Division	Apps	Goals	Apps	Goals	Apps	Goals	Apps	Goals	Apps	Goals
Créteil	2011–12	Championnat National	20	5	3	2			–		23	7
Créteil	2012–13	Championnat National	34	9	0	0	0	0	–		34	9
Créteil	Total		54	14	3	2	0	0	0	0	57	16
Istres	2013–14	Ligue 2	30	5	2	0	1	0	–		33	5
Istres	2014–15	Championnat National	2	2	0	0	1	0	–		3	2
Istres	Total		32	7	2	0	2	0	0	0	36	7
Créteil	2014–15	Ligue 2	26	2	0	0	2	0	–		29	2
Créteil	2015–16	Ligue 2	31	4	0	0	1	0	–		32	4
Créteil	Total		57	6	1	0	3	0	0	0	61	6
Gabala	2016–17	Azerbaijan Premier League	16	7	2	1	–		11	3	29	11
Gabala	2017–18	Azerbaijan Premier League	27	13	4	3	–		2	0	33	16
Gabala	Total		43	20	6	4	0	0	13	3	62	27
Neftchi Baku	2018–19	Azerbaijan Premier League	26	14	2	0	–		2	2	30	16
Neftchi Baku	2019–20	Azerbaijan Premier League	15	7	2	0	–		2	0	19	7
Neftchi Baku	Total		41	21	4	0	0	0	4	2	49	23
Apollon Limassol	2020–21	Cypriot First Division	25	6	0	0	–		3	3	28	9
Apollon Limassol	2021–22	Cypriot First Division	25	9	2	0	–		2	0	29	9
Apollon Limassol	2022–23	Cypriot First Division	7	0	1	1	–		5	0	13	1
Apollon Limassol	Total		57	15	3	1	0	0	10	3	70	19
Career total			284	81	19	7	5	0	27	8	335	97

== Honours ==
Individual

- Azerbaijan Premier League Top Scorer: 2017–18, 2019–20
