= Soni Mustivar =

Association football player (born 1990)

Personal information
- Full name: Soni Mustivar
- Date of birth: 12 February 1990 (age 36)
- Place of birth: Aubervilliers, France
- Height: 5 ft 9 in (1.75 m)
- Position: Midfielder

Team information
- Current team: Gueugnon (U15 manager)

Youth career
- 1998–2004: CFF Paris
- 2004–2007: Aubervilliers
- 2007–2008: Bastia

Senior career*
Years	Team	Apps	(Gls)
2008–2011	Bastia	21	(0)
2010–2011	→ Orléans (loan)	12	(1)
2012–2015	Petrolul Ploiești	76	(5)
2015–2017	Sporting Kansas City	64	(2)
2018–2020	Neftçi	43	(2)
2020	Hermannstadt	9	(0)
2021	Nea Salamis Famagusta	15	(0)
2022	Entente SSG	11	(1)
2022–2023	Gueugnon	24	(1)

International career
2009	France U20	4	(0)
2013–2021	Haiti	25	(2)

Managerial career
- 2023–: Gueugnon (U15 manager)
- * Club domestic league appearances and goals

Soni Mustivar (born 12 February 1990) is a retired professional footballer who played as a midfielder. Born in France, he played for the Haiti national team.

== Club career ==
Born Aubervilliers, France, Soni was trained at the Centre de Formation de Football de Paris, commonly called CFFP, in the heart of Paris before moving to his hometown club Aubervilliers. Following a stint there, he headed to the island of Corsica and joined Ligue 2 club Bastia. Due to injuries, he was called up to the first team for during 2008–09 season in Ligue 2. He made his professional debut on 29 August against Tours, coming on as a substitute in the 35th minute for the injured Hassoun Camara. He played the rest of the match as Bastia secured a 1–0 victory with a goal from Pierre-Yves André. He made five straight substitute appearances in the league before making his first start 1 May against Vannes in a 3–1 win. Ironically, he was substituted out in the 35th minute, due to an injury, and replaced by Hassoun Camara. In between those appearances, he had two solid starts in the Coupe de la Ligue against Strasbourg and Châteauroux.

On 27 March 2018, Azerbaijani club Neftçi announced the signing of Mustivar on a contract until the summer of 2019. After extending his contract with Neftçi for an additional year in the summer of 2019, Mustivar left the club on 19 June 2020 after his contract expired.

In January 2022, Mustivar signed for French club Entente SSG. In July 2022, he joined Gueugnon. In addition to playing for the club, Mustivar was also involved with the club's U15 team. When he hung up his boots in the summer of 2023, Mustivar was hired as coach for the club's U15 team.

== International career ==
Soni has earned caps with the France under-16 team, but went unnoticed during his development years. On 25 May 2009, he was selected to the under-20 squad to participate in the 2009 Mediterranean Games.

In 2013, Mustivar made his Haiti debut in a 4–1 loss to South Korea.

== Career statistics ==
=== Club ===
As of 24 July 2022

Appearances and goals by club, season and competition
Club	Season	League			National cup		Continental		Other		Total	
Club	Season	Division	Apps	Goals	Apps	Goals	Apps	Goals	Apps	Goals	Apps	Goals
Bastia	2008–09	Ligue 2	10	0	0	0	—		2	0	12	0
Bastia	2009–10	Ligue 2	13	0	0	0	—		—		13	0
Bastia	Total		23	0	0	0	—		2	0	25	0
Orléans	2010–11	Championnat National	12	0	0	0	—		—		12	0
Petrolul Ploiești	2011–12	Liga I	15	2	0	0	—		—		15	2
Petrolul Ploiești	2012–13	Liga I	25	0	6	0	—		—		31	0
Petrolul Ploiești	2013–14	Liga I	25	1	2	1	5	0	1	0	33	2
Petrolul Ploiești	2014–15	Liga I	11	0	1	0	3	0	—		15	0
Petrolul Ploiești	Total		76	3	9	1	8	0	1	0	94	4
Sporting Kansas City	2015	Major League Soccer	25	0	5	1	—		1	0	31	1
Sporting Kansas City	2016	Major League Soccer	25	0	2	0	2	0	1	0	30	0
Sporting Kansas City	2017	Major League Soccer	14	0	1	0	—		0	0	15	0
Sporting Kansas City	Total		64	0	8	1	2	0	2	0	76	1
Neftçi	2017–18	Azerbaijan Premier League	6	0	2	1	—		—		8	1
Neftçi	2018–19	Azerbaijan Premier League	23	0	2	0	2	0	—		27	0
Neftçi	2019–20	Azerbaijan Premier League	14	2	2	0	5	0	—		21	2
Neftçi	Total		43	2	6	1	7	0	—		56	3
Hermannstadt	2020–21	Liga I	9	0	0	0	—		—		9	0
Nea Salamina	2020–21	Cypriot First Division	15	0	2	0	—		—		17	0
Entente SSG	2021–22	Championnat National 2	11	1	0	0	—		—		11	1
Gueugnon	2022–23	Championnat National 3	0	0	0	0	—		—		0	0
Career total			253	6	25	3	17	0	5	0	300	9

=== International ===
Scores and results list Haiti's goal tally first, score column indicates score after each Mustivar goal.

List of international goals scored by Soni Mustivar
No.	Date	Venue	Opponent	Score	Result	Competition
1	10 September 2018	Stade Sylvio Cator, Port-au-Prince, Haiti	Sint Maarten	12–0	13–0	2019–20 CONCACAF Nations League qualification
2	16 October 2018	Stade Pierre Aliker, Fort de France, Martinique	Saint Lucia	1–0	2–1	2019–20 CONCACAF Nations League qualification

== Honours ==
Petrolul Ploiești

- Romanian Cup: 2012–13

Sporting Kansas City

- Lamar Hunt U.S. Open Cup: 2015, 2017
