= Les Pavillons-sous-Bois =

Les-Pavillons-sous-Bois
- Commune
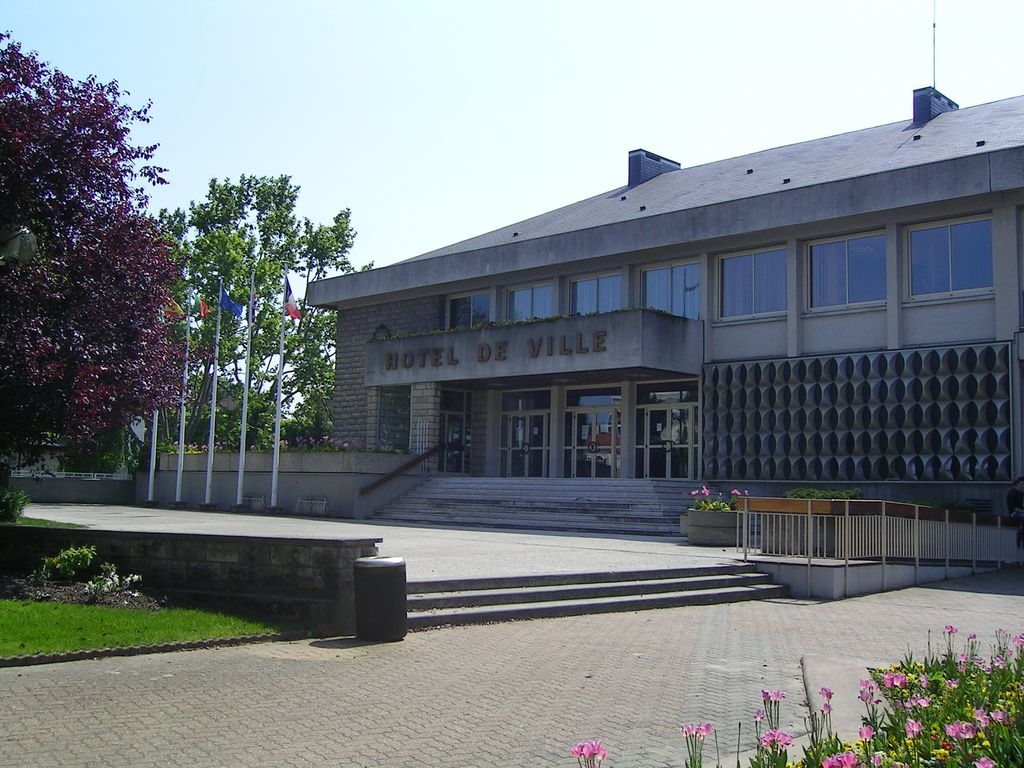
- The Hôtel de Ville

- Coat of arms

- Location (in red) within Paris inner suburbs
- Location of Les-Pavillons-sous-Bois
- Location within France Location within Île-de-France (region)
- Coordinates: 48°54′N 2°30′E
- Country: France
- Region: Île-de-France
- Department: Seine-Saint-Denis
- Arrondissement: Le Raincy
- Canton: Bondy
- Intercommunality: Grand Paris

Government
  - Mayor (2026–32): Philippe Dallier
- Area^{1}: 2.92 km^{2} (1.13 sq mi)
- Elevation: 55 m (180 ft)
- Population (2023): 25,804
  - Density: 8,840/km^{2} (22,900/sq mi)
- Time zone: UTC+01:00 (CET)
  - Summer (DST): UTC+02:00 (CEST)
- INSEE/Postal code: 93057 /93320
- ^{1} French Land Register data, which excludes lakes, ponds, glaciers > 1 km^{2} (0.386 sq mi or 247 acres) and river estuaries.

Les Pavillons-sous-Bois (French pronunciation: [lɛ pavijɔ̃ su bwa]) is a commune in the eastern suburbs of Paris, France. It is located 12.8 km (8.0 mi) from the center of Paris.

== History ==
The commune of Les Pavillons-sous-Bois was created on 3 January 1905 by detaching its territory from the commune of Bondy but the first traces of activity on its territory are found around the 17th century. The name of the commune literally means "the lodges under wood". The lodges mentioned in the name are two guard lodges, built of local stone around 1770 and rehabilitated in 1998, that were located at the entrance of the estate belonging to the château du Raincy. The wood mentioned in the name is the ancient Bondy Forest which covered most of the area to the northeast of Paris.

The Hôtel de Ville was completed in around 1969.

== Population ==
Historical population

Year	Pop.	±% p.a.
1906	3,644	—
1911	5,389	+8.14%
1921	7,850	+3.83%
1926	10,920	+6.82%
1931	14,334	+5.59%
1936	15,175	+1.15%
1946	15,093	−0.05%
1954	16,862	+1.40%
1962	19,022	+1.52%

Year	Pop.	±% p.a.
1968	19,084	+0.05%
1975	18,638	−0.34%
1982	17,185	−1.15%
1990	17,375	+0.14%
1999	18,420	+0.65%
2007	20,424	+1.30%
2012	22,331	+1.80%
2017	23,962	+1.42%
2023	25,804	+1.24%

Source: EHESS and INSEE (1968–2023)

== Transport ==
Les Pavillons-sous-Bois is served by no station of the Paris Métro or RER, but since 2006 its own Tram station on line, Les Pavillons-sous-bois. The closest RER station to Les Pavillons-sous-Bois is Le Raincy – Villemomble – Montfermeil station on Paris RER line. This station is located in the neighboring commune of Le Raincy, 3.2 km (2.0 mi) from the centre of Les Pavillons-sous-Bois.

== Urban morphology ==
The Canal of Ourcq, a channel built by Napoleon III to bring more water to Paris, and the national road RN3 divide the area into a south zone, dedicated to traditional habitat (mainly houses with gardens) and urban activities, and a north zone, for a long time underprivileged, more industrial, nowadays in a rehabilitation process including new habitation areas, sports and leisure areas along the channel and new public service buildings.

== Education ==
Schools:

- Preschools: École Robillard, Marguerite Léopold, Jean-Macé, Eugène Fischer, Fontenoy
- Elementary schools: École Robillard, Julie-Victoire Daubié, Monceau, Pierre Brossolette, Fontenoy
- One special primary school (primaire d'application): École Jules Verne
- Public junior high schools: Collège Anatole France and Collège Eric Tabarly
- Public senior high schools: Lycée Professionnel Nicolas Ledoux
- A private elementary-junior high school: Ecole-Collège privé de l'Alliance

== Notable people ==
- Herve Batomenila, footballer
- Aïda Fall, basketball player
- Denise Vernac, film actress
- Sarah Knafo, politician

== See also ==
- Communes of the Seine-Saint-Denis department
