= Bondy =

- Commune
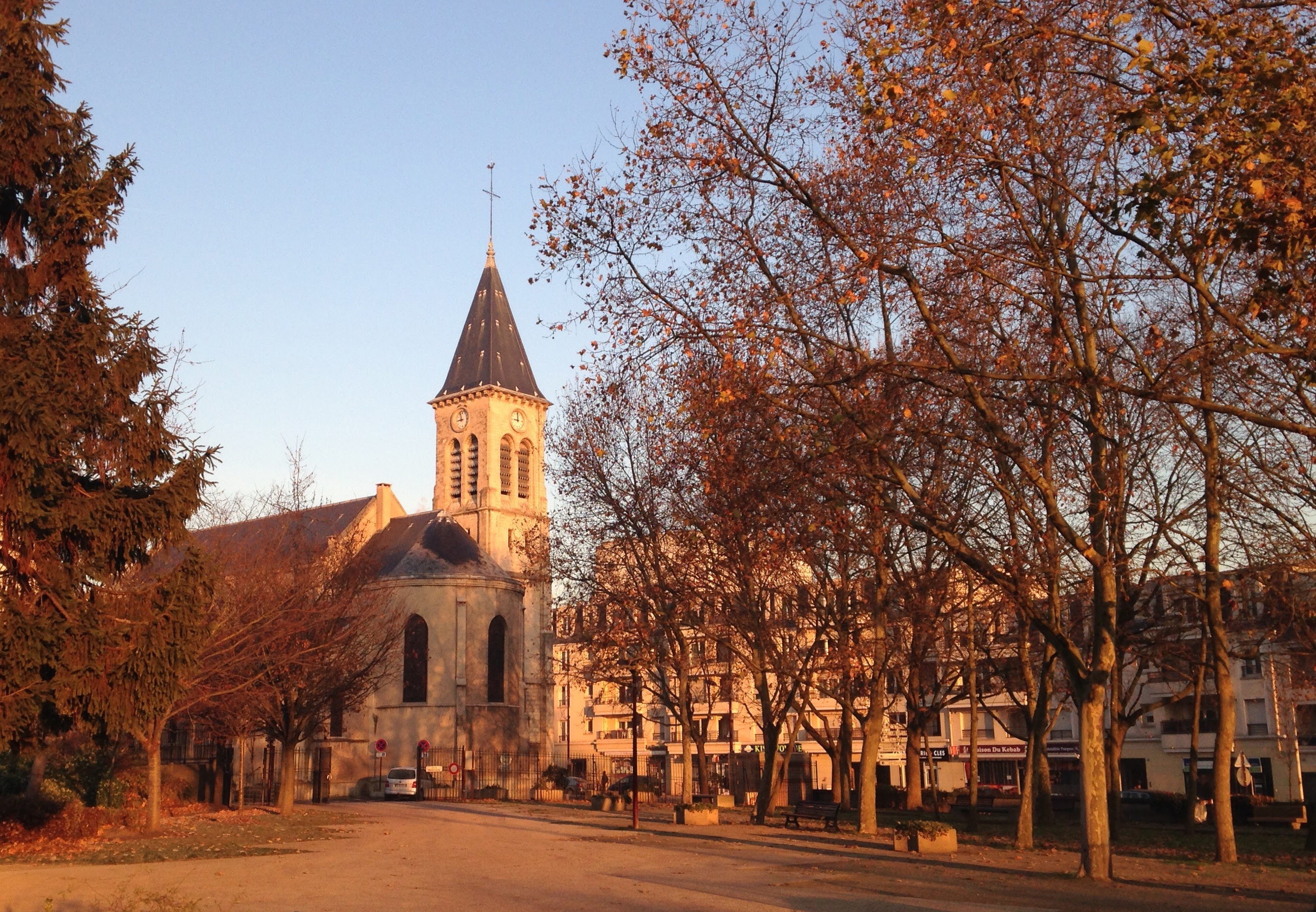
- Church of Bondy

- Coat of arms

- Location (in red) within Paris inner suburbs
- Location of Bondy
- Location within France Location within Île-de-France (region)
- Coordinates: 48°54′08″N 2°28′58″E
- Country: France
- Region: Île-de-France
- Department: Seine-Saint-Denis
- Arrondissement: Bobigny
- Canton: Bondy
- Intercommunality: Grand Paris

Government
  - Mayor (2026–32): Stephen Hervé (LR)
- Area^{1}: 5.47 km^{2} (2.11 sq mi)
- Elevation: 52 m (171 ft)
- Highest elevation: 65 m (213 ft)
- Lowest elevation: 37 m (121 ft)
- Population (2023): 50,595
  - Density: 9,250/km^{2} (24,000/sq mi)
- Demonym: Bondynois
- Time zone: UTC+01:00 (CET)
  - Summer (DST): UTC+02:00 (CEST)
- INSEE/Postal code: 93010 /93140
- Website: www.ville-bondy.fr
- ^{1} French Land Register data, which excludes lakes, ponds, glaciers > 1 km^{2} (0.386 sq mi or 247 acres) and river estuaries.

Bondy (French pronunciation: [bɔ̃di]) is a commune in the northeastern suburbs of Paris, France. It is located 10.9 km (6.8 mi) from the centre of Paris, in the Seine-Saint-Denis department.

== Name ==
The name Bondy was recorded for the first time around AD 600 as Bonitiacum, meaning "estate of Bonitius", a Gallo-Roman landowner.

== History ==
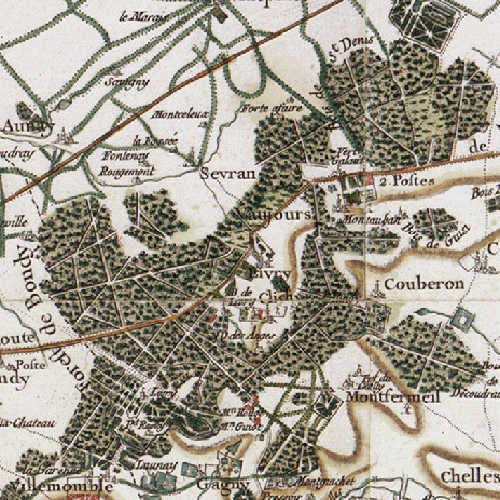
Bondy, c. 1780

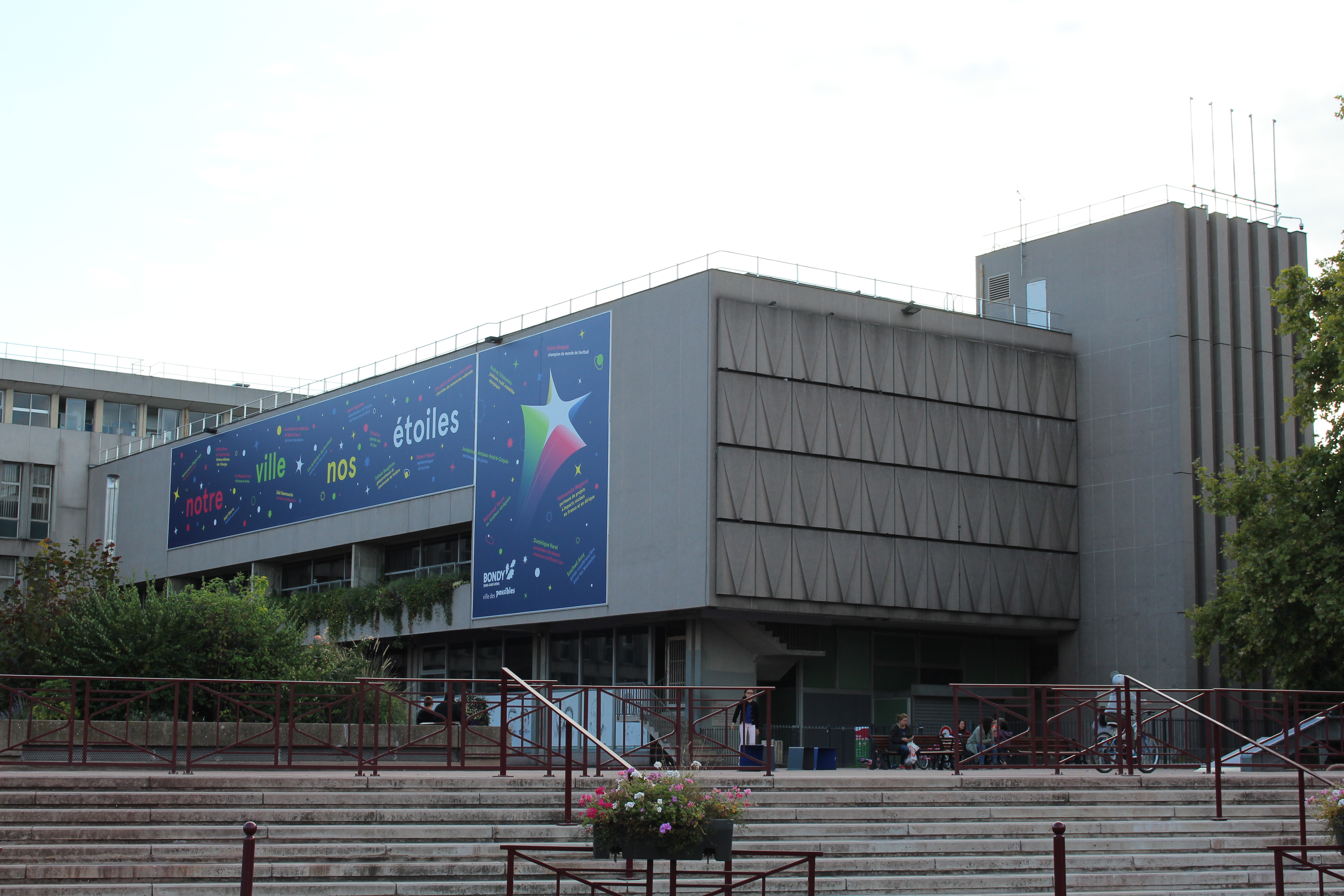
The Hôtel de Ville

During the Middle Ages, Bondy was mostly forest, and the forest of Bondy was a well-known haunt of bandits and robbers and was considered extremely dangerous.

On 3 January 1905, a third of the territory of Bondy was detached and became the commune of Les Pavillons-sous-Bois.

The current Hôtel de Ville was completed in 1970.

On 30 October 2007, a gas explosion killed one person and injured 46 people.

Bondy and its integration into Paris is the subject of part of the second-last chapter of Graham Robb's book Parisians.

== Administration ==
Bondy is part of the canton of Bondy, created in 2015.

== Transport ==
Bondy is served by Bondy station on Paris RER line E and the Line 4 (T4) of the Tramways in Île-de-France.

== Education ==
As of 2016, the commune had 27 state-funded primary schools, with 6,900 students. There were also three publicly funded lycées, or senior high schools, and five junior high schools.

- There are 13 écoles maternelles, or preschools, and 14 publicly funded elementary schools
- The junior high schools are named after: Pierre Brossolette, Henri Sellier, Jean Zay, Jean Renoir, and Pierre Curie
- There are three state-funded high schools: Lycée Léo-Lagrange, Lycée Marcel-Pagnol, and Lycée Jean-Renoir.

Bondy also has a private Roman Catholic high school, Institut privé de l'Assomption, which has its own elementary school.

== Population growth ==
The population data in the table and graph below refer to the commune of Bondy proper in its geography at the given years. The commune of Bondy ceded the commune of Les Pavillons-sous-Bois in 1906.

Historical population

| Year | Pop. | ±% p.a. |
|---|---|---|
| 1793 | 650 | — |
| 1821 | 605 | −0.26% |
| 1846 | 782 | +1.03% |
| 1851 | 815 | +0.83% |
| 1856 | 1,189 | +7.85% |
| 1861 | 1,458 | +4.16% |
| 1866 | 1,623 | +2.17% |
| 1872 | 1,677 | +0.55% |
| 1876 | 2,018 | +4.74% |
| 1881 | 2,280 | +2.47% |
| 1886 | 3,004 | +5.67% |
| 1891 | 3,638 | +3.90% |
| 1896 | 4,457 | +4.14% |
| 1901 | 6,353 | +7.35% |
| 1906 | 5,195 | −3.94% |
| 1911 | 7,496 | +7.61% |

| Year | Pop. | ±% p.a. |
|---|---|---|
| 1921 | 10,104 | +3.03% |
| 1926 | 15,282 | +8.63% |
| 1931 | 19,452 | +4.94% |
| 1936 | 20,539 | +1.09% |
| 1946 | 19,487 | −0.52% |
| 1954 | 22,411 | +1.76% |
| 1962 | 38,039 | +6.84% |
| 1968 | 51,652 | +5.23% |
| 1975 | 48,333 | −0.94% |
| 1982 | 44,301 | −1.24% |
| 1990 | 46,676 | +0.65% |
| 1999 | 46,826 | +0.04% |
| 2007 | 53,159 | +1.60% |
| 2012 | 52,787 | −0.14% |
| 2017 | 53,353 | +0.21% |
| 2023 | 50,595 | −0.88% |

Source: EHESS and INSEE (1968–2023)

=== Immigration ===
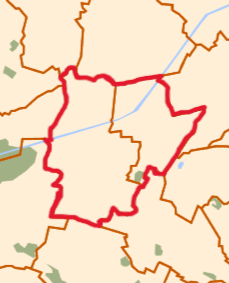
Bondy before detachment of Les Pavillons-sous-Bois in 1905

Place of birth of residents of Bondy in 1999
| Born in metropolitan France | Born outside metropolitan France | | | |
|---|---|---|---|---|
| 72.2% | 27.8% | | | |
| 72.2% | Born in overseas France | Born in foreign countries with French citizenship at birth^{1} | EU-15 immigrants^{2} | Non-EU-15 immigrants |
| 72.2% | 3.6% | 2.7% | 3.4% | 18.1% |
^{1} This group is made up largely of former French settlers, such as pieds-noirs in Northwest Africa, followed by former colonial citizens who had French citizenship at birth (such as was often the case for the native elite in French colonies), as well as to a lesser extent foreign-born children of French expatriates. A foreign country is understood as a country not part of France in 1999, so a person born for example in 1950 in Algeria, when Algeria was an integral part of France, is nonetheless listed as a person born in a foreign country in French statistics.^{2} An immigrant is a person born in a foreign country not having French citizenship at birth. An immigrant may have acquired French citizenship since moving to France, but is still considered an immigrant in French statistics. On the other hand, persons born in France with foreign citizenship (the children of immigrants) are not listed as immigrants.

== Notable people ==
- Sylvie Bouchet Bellecourt, politician
- Adama Camara, footballer
- Élodie Fontan, actress
- Serge Gakpe, footballer
- Max Hilaire, footballer
- Muriel Hurtis, track and field, athlete
- Jonathan Ikone, footballer
- Steeven Joseph-Monrose, footballer
- Kevin Lafrance, footballer
- David Larose, judoka
- Lartiste, singer
- André Malraux, novelist, art theorist and minister of cultural affairs
- Kylian Mbappé, footballer and currently the captain of the France national football team
- Sylvain Meslien, footballer
- Randal Kolo Muani, footballer
- Guy Moussi, footballer
- Michael Nicoise, footballer
- Maureen Nisima, fencer
- Claude-Carloman de Rulhière, poet and historian
- Wiliam Saliba, footballer
- Lalya Sidibe, basketball player
- Alpha Sissoko, footballer
- Doriane Tahane, basketball player
- Audrey Tcheumeo, judoka
- Teddy Tinmar, athlete
- Karidja Touré, actress
- Bakaye Traoré, footballer
- Fodie Traoré, footballer
- Jérémy Jacquet, footballer
- Jimmy Vicaut, athlete
- Thierry Zig, basketball player
- Tiakola, rapper

== See also ==
- Communes of the Seine-Saint-Denis department
