= Lalya Sidibé =

French basketball player

Personal information
- Born: March 15, 1991 (age 35) Bondy, France

Career information
- Playing career: 2009–2011

Career history
- 2009–2011: Challes-les-Eaux

Lalya Sidibé (born March 15, 1991, in Bondy) is a French basketball player who played for club Challes Les Eaux of the League feminine de basket the top basketball league for women in France during the 2009–2011 seasons.
