= Hervé Batoménila =

Gabonese footballer (born 1984)

Personal information
- Date of birth: 18 May 1984 (age 42)
- Place of birth: Les Pavillons-sous-Bois, France
- Height: 1.77 m (5 ft 9 1/2 in)
- Positions: Defensive midfielder; defender

Team information
- Current team: Dijon FCO
- Number: 18

Youth career
- 2002–2003: RC Strasbourg

Senior career*
Years	Team	Apps	(Gls)
2003–2004	Strasbourg B	13	(0)
2004–2006	Villemomble Sports	33	(0)
2006–2007	Paris FC	22	(0)
2007–2010	Dijon FCO	50	(0)
2011–2012	Paris FC	4	(0)
2013–2015	AS Cherbourg	26	(0)
2016–	FC Miami City	0	(0)
- * Club domestic league appearances and goals

Hervé Batoménila (born 18 May 1984 in Les Pavillons-sous-Bois) is a Gabonese professional football player, who currently, plays in the Premier Development League for FC Miami City.

== Early life ==
Batoménila (a.k.a. Bato), was born in the Parisian suburb of Les Pavillons-sous-Bois to Gabonese parents.

== International career ==
On 24 March 2009 was called up to the Gabon national football team, but has yet to debut for the squad. After a strong carrier in France, Bato decided to try his chance overseas. He has been signed by the FC Miami City, American soccer team based in Miami, Florida, United States. The team plays in the Premier Development League.
