= Canton of Bondy =

Coordinates: 48.90°N 2.48°E

The canton of Bondy is an administrative division of the Seine-Saint-Denis department, Île-de-France region, northern France. It was created at the French canton reorganisation which came into effect in March 2015. Its seat is in Bondy.

It consists of the following communes:

1. Bobigny (partly)
2. Bondy
3. Les Pavillons-sous-Bois
