= Claude-Carloman de Rulhière =

French poet and historian (1735–1791)

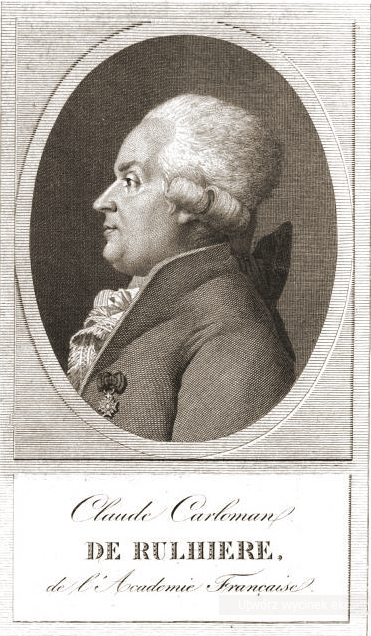
Claude Carloman de Rulhière

Claude-Carloman de Rulhière (Note: Or Rulhières) (Note: French pronunciation: [klod kaʁlɔman də ʁyljɛʁ]) (12 June 1735 – 30 January 1791) was a French poet and historian.

== Biography ==
He was born at Bondy, Seine-Saint-Denis. He became aide-de-camp to Marshal Richelieu, whom he followed through the Hanoverian campaign of 1757 to his government at Bordeaux in 1758; and at the age of twenty-five he was sent to St Petersburg as secretary of legation. Here he witnessed the coup d'état which seated Catherine II of Russia on the throne, and thus obtained the facts noted in Anecdotes sur la révolution de Russie en 1762. Catherine made repeated efforts to secure the destruction of the manuscript, which remained unpublished until after the empress's death.

Rulhière became secretary to the comte de Provence (afterwards Louis XVIII) in 1773, and he was admitted to the Académie Française in 1787. The later years of his life were spent chiefly in Paris, where he held an appointment in the Foreign Office and went much into society; but he visited Germany and Poland in 1776. His unfinished Histoire de l'anarchie de Pologne (4 vols., 1807) was published posthumously under the editorship of PCF Daunou. The only important historical work which he published during his lifetime was his Eclaircissements historiques sur les causes de la révocation de l'édit de Nantes ... (2 vols., 1788), undertaken in view of the restoration to the Protestants of their civil rights. Rulhière died at Bondy.

His short sketch of the Russian coup d'état of 1762 is justly ranked among the masterpieces of the kind in French. Of the larger Poland Thomas Carlyle, as justly, complains that its allowance of fact is too small in proportion to its bulk. The author was also a fertile writer of vers de société ("[polite] society verses"), short satires, epigrams, etc., and he had a considerable reputation among the witty and ill-natured group also containing Nicolas Chamfort, Antoine de Rivarol, Louis René de Champcenetz, etc. On the other hand, he has the credit of caring for Jean-Jacques Rousseau in his morose old age, until Rousseau as usual quarrelled with him.

Rulhière's works were edited, with a notice by Pierre-René Auguis, in 1819 (Paris, 6 vols. in-8). The Russian Revolution may be found in the Chefs-d'œuvre historiques of the Collection Didot, and the Poland, with title altered to Révolutions de Pologne, in the same collection. See also a notice by Eugène Asse prefixed to an edition (1890) of Rulhière's Anecdotes sur le Maréchal de Richelieu; Sainte-Beuve, Causeries du lundi (vol. iv.).
