= 2015 Sporting Kansas City season =

Sporting Kansas City
2015 season
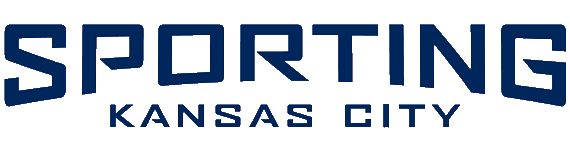
- Owner: Sporting Club
- Head coach: Peter Vermes
- Stadium: Sporting Park
- MLS: Conference: 6th Overall: 10th
- Playoffs: Knockout Stage
- U.S. Open Cup: Champions
- Top goalscorer: League: Dom Dwyer 12; All: Dom Dwyer 17
- Highest home attendance: 21,505 (June 6 vs. Seattle)
- Lowest home attendance: League: 18,861 (September 18 vs. FC Dallas); All: 16,117 (Aug 12 vs. Real Salt Lake)
- Average home league attendance: League: 19,687; All: 19,371
Home colors	Away colors	Third colors

The 2015 Sporting Kansas City season was the twentieth season of the team's existence in Major League Soccer and the fifth year played under the Sporting Kansas City moniker.

Due to the dissolution of Chivas USA and MLS expansion to New York and Orlando, Sporting Kansas City moved to the Western Conference. Sporting was a member of the Western Conference for its first nine seasons before moving to the Eastern Conference for the previous ten seasons.

== Squad ==
=== First team roster ===
As of October 13, 2015.

Note: Flags indicate national team as defined under FIFA eligibility rules; some limited exceptions apply. Players may hold more than one non-FIFA nationality. Squad correct as of October 13, 2015.

No.	Pos.	Nation	Player
2	DF	USA	Erik Palmer-Brown (HGP)
3	DF	USA	Ike Opara
4	DF	USA	Kevin Ellis (HGP)
5	DF	USA	Matt Besler (Captain; DP)
6	MF	BRA	Paulo Nagamura
7	DF	USA	Chance Myers
8	MF	USA	Graham Zusi (DP)
9	FW	HUN	Krisztián Németh
10	MF	USA	Benny Feilhaber
11	MF	VEN	Bernardo Añor
12	MF	USA	Mikey Lopez (GA)
13	DF	USA	Amadou Dia
14	FW	ENG	Dom Dwyer
15	DF	USA	Seth Sinovic
17	DF	USA	Saad Abdul-Salaam
20	DF	USA	Amobi Okugo
21	GK	USA	Jon Kempin (HGP)
22	MF	USA	Connor Hallisey
23	DF	USA	Jalil Anibaba
27	MF	HON	Roger Espinoza
29	GK	USA	Tim Melia
37	FW	USA	Jacob Peterson
71	DF	CAN	Marcel de Jong
93	MF	HAI	Soni Mustivar
94	MF	COL	Jimmy Medranda
96	MF	ESP	Jordi Quintillà

== Player movement ==
=== In ===
Date	Player	Position	Previous club	Fee/notes	Ref
December 8, 2014	(Venezuela) Bernardo Añor	MF	(United States) Columbus Crew SC	Trade for Allocation Money	
December 12, 2014	(United States) Jalil Anibaba	MF	(United States) Orlando City SC	Trade in exchange for Aurélien Collin	
December 16, 2014	(Haiti) James Marcelin	MF	(United States) Fort Lauderdale Strikers	Free transfer	
December 18, 2014	(Hungary) Krisztián Németh	FW	(Netherlands) Roda JC Kerkrade	Free transfer	
December 18, 2014	(Chile) Luis Marín	GK	Universidad de Chile	Free transfer	
December 23, 2014	(United States) Tim Melia	GK	(United States) Chivas USA	Free transfer	
January 6, 2015	(Honduras) Roger Espinoza	MF	(England) Wigan Athletic	Free transfer	
January 15, 2015	(United States) Connor Hallisey	MF	(United States) UC Berkeley	2015 MLS SuperDraft	
January 15, 2015	(United States) Saad Abdul-Salaam	DF	(United States) University of Akron	2015 MLS SuperDraft	
January 27, 2015	(United States) Servando Carrasco	MF	(United States) Houston Dynamo	Trade for rights in exchange for draft pick	
February 13, 2015	(Haiti) Soni Mustivar	MF	(Romania) FC Petrolul Ploiești	Free transfer	
February 18, 2015	(United States) Amadou Dia	MF	(United States) Clemson University	2015 MLS SuperDraft	
February 24, 2015	(Sierra Leone) James Ansu Rogers	FW	(United States) University of New Mexico	2015 MLS SuperDraft	
March 2, 2015	(Canada) Marcel de Jong	DF	(Germany) FC Augsburg	Free	
July 20, 2015	(United States) Amobi Okugo	DF/MF	(United States) Orlando City SC	Trade for Servando Carrasco	
August 6, 2015	(Spain) Jordi Quintillà	MF	(France) Ajaccio	Transfer	

=== Out ===
Date	Player	Position	New club	Fee/notes	Ref
November 25, 2014	(Spain) Toni Dovale	MF	(Spain) Lugo	Option declined	
November 25, 2014	(Ghana) Michael Kafari	MF		Option declined	
November 25, 2014	(Spain) Victor Muñoz	MF	(United States) Arizona United SC	Option declined	
November 25, 2014	(Kenya) Lawrence Olum	MF	(Malaysia) Kedah FA	Contract terminated	
November 25, 2014	(Lebanon) Soony Saad	FW	(Thailand) BEC Tero Sasana	Out of contract	
November 25, 2014	(United States) Christian Duke	MF	(United States) Oklahoma City Energy FC	Waived	
December 8, 2014	(France) Aurélien Collin	DF	(United States) Orlando City SC	Trade for Allocation Money and Jalil Anibaba	
December 8, 2014	(United States) C. J. Sapong	DF	(United States) Philadelphia Union	Trade for 2015 MLS SuperDraft pick	
December 10, 2014	(United States) Sal Zizzo	MF	(United States) New York City FC	2014 MLS Expansion Draft	
December 12, 2014	(United States) Eric Kronberg	GK	(Canada) Montreal Impact	Option declined	
December 12, 2014	(United States) Andy Gruenebaum	GK	(United States) San Jose Earthquakes	Option declined	
January 20, 2015	(Argentina) Claudio Bieler	FW	(Argentina) Quilmes	Out of contract	
February 24, 2015	(Honduras) Jorge Claros	MF	(China) Qingdao Jonoon	Contract terminated	
May 27, 2015	(Chile) Luis Marín	GK	(Chile) Palestino	Mutually terminated	
June 22, 2015	(Sierra Leone) James Ansu Rogers	FW		Waived	
July 20, 2015	(United States) Servando Carrasco	MF	(United States) Orlando City SC	Trade for Amobi Okugo	

=== Loans ===
==== In ====
No.	Pos.	Player	Loaned from	Start	End	Source
40	DF	(Brazil) Igor Julião	(Brazil) Fluminense FC	April 4, 2014	December 31, 2014	

==== Out ====
No.	Pos.	Player	Loaned to	Start	End	Source
21	GK	(United States) Jon Kempin	(United States) San Antonio Scorpions	March 20, 2015	May 27, 2015	
17	DF	(United States) Saad Abdul-Salaam	(United States) San Antonio Scorpions	April 1, 2015	May 19, 2015	

== Competitions ==
=== Match results ===
Win Tie Loss

=== Preseason ===
==== Desert Friendlies ====
January 31, 2015	**Portland Timbers**	**2–0**	**Sporting Kansas City**	Tucson, Arizona
19:00 CST	Villafaña (yellow card) 23'; Fernández 30' (pen.); Nanchoff 53'	Report	Otero (yellow card) 40'	Stadium: North Stadium at Kino Sports Complex

February 9, 2015	**FC Tucson**	**2–4**	**Sporting Kansas City**	Tucson, Arizona
11:30 CST	Brooks 48'; Boggs 74'	Report	Carrasco (yellow card) 42'; Németh 60' (pen.), 75', 90'; Medranda 77'	Stadium: North Stadium at Kino Sports Complex

February 28, 2015	**Sporting Kansas City**	**1–0**	**Minnesota United FC**	Tucson, Arizona
	Añor 8', (yellow card) 23'; Opara (yellow card) 72'	Report	Calvano (yellow card) 23'; Steele (yellow card) 63'; Watson (yellow card) 81'	Stadium: North Stadium at Kino Sports Complex

==== Desert Diamond Cup ====
Kickoff times are in CST (UTC-06) unless shown otherwise

February 18, 2015	**Colorado Rapids**	**2–2**	**Sporting Kansas City**	Tucson, Arizona
18:30 CST	Torres 12'; Badji 17'; Marcelo (yellow card) 29'; Flores (yellow card) 56' (red card) 75'; Cronin (yellow card) 64'	Report	Dwyer (yellow card) 23'; Nagamura (yellow card) 25'; Espinoza (yellow card) 32'; Németh 77' (pen.); Añor 78'	Stadium: North Stadium at Kino Sports Complex

February 21, 2015	**Seattle Sounders FC**	**2–3**	**Sporting Kansas City**	Tucson, Arizona
21:00 CST	Pineda (yellow card) 22'; Mansaray 74'; Cooper 81'	Report	Németh (yellow card) 25', (goal) 39'; Besler (yellow card) 27'; Zusi 34'; Añor (yellow card) 42'; Sinovic (yellow card) 67'; Rogers 73'; Lopez (yellow card) 88'	Stadium: North Stadium at Kino Sports Complex

February 25, 2015	**Real Salt Lake**	**2–1**	**Sporting Kansas City**	Tucson, Arizona
21:00 CST	Welshman 12' (yellow card) 59'; Ovalle (yellow card) 38'; Sandoval 47'; Velazco (yellow card) 85'	Report	Medranda (yellow card) 43'; Sinovic (yellow card) 59'; Dwyer 66'; Németh (yellow card) 72'; Añor (yellow card) 83'	Stadium: North Stadium at Kino Sports Complex

=== Major League Soccer ===
==== Western Conference standings ====
Pos	Team	Pld	W	L	T	GF	GA	GD	Pts	Qualification
4	Seattle Sounders FC	34	15	13	6	44	36	+8	**51**	**MLS Cup Knockout Round**
5	LA Galaxy	34	14	11	9	56	46	+10	**51**	**MLS Cup Knockout Round**
**6**	Sporting Kansas City	**34**	**14**	**11**	**9**	**48**	**45**	**+3**	**51**	**MLS Cup Knockout Round**
7	San Jose Earthquakes	34	13	13	8	41	39	+2	**47**	
8	Houston Dynamo	34	11	14	9	42	49	−7	**42**	

Source: MLS

==== League table ====
Pos	Team	Pld	W	L	T	GF	GA	GD	Pts	Qualification
8	D.C. United	34	15	13	6	43	45	−2	**51**	
9	LA Galaxy	34	14	11	9	56	46	+10	**51**	
**10**	Sporting Kansas City	**34**	**14**	**11**	**9**	**48**	**45**	**+3**	**51**	**CONCACAF Champions League**
11	New England Revolution	34	14	12	8	48	47	+1	**50**	
12	Toronto FC	34	15	15	4	58	58	0	**49**	

Source: MLS
Rules for classification: 1) points; 2) total wins; 3) total goal differential; 4) total goals scored

==== Regular season ====
Kickoff times are in CDT (UTC-05) unless shown otherwise

March 8, 2015 1	**Sporting Kansas City**	**1–1**	**New York Red Bulls**	Kansas City, Kansas
18:00	Besler (yellow card) 30' (red card) 70'; Opara 50'	Report	Sam 54'; Wright-Phillips (yellow card) 80'; Kljestan (yellow card) 86'	Stadium: Sporting Park; Attendance: 19,784; Referee: Baldomero Toledo

March 14, 2015 2	**FC Dallas**	**3–1**	**Sporting Kansas City**	Frisco, Texas
19:30	Perez 17', 52'; Harris (yellow card) 35'; Castillo 73'; Bekker (yellow card) 90'	Report	Zusi (yellow card) 41'; Espinoza 44'; Ellis (yellow card) 90'	Stadium: Toyota Stadium; Attendance: 14,149; Referee: Jair Marrufo

March 21, 2015 3	**Sporting Kansas City**	**0–0**	**Portland Timbers**	Kansas City, Kansas
19:30	Feilhaber (yellow card) 82'	Report	Chara (yellow card) 72'	Stadium: Sporting Park; Attendance: 20,848; Referee: Silviu Petrescu

March 28, 2015 4	**New York City FC**	**0–1**	**Sporting Kansas City**	New York, New York
18:00 CST (UTC-06)	Diskerud (yellow card) 73'; Watson-Siriboe (yellow card) 85'	Report	Opara 12'; Nagamura (yellow card) 68'	Stadium: Yankee Stadium; Attendance: 27,545; Referee: Edvin Jurisevic

April 5, 2015 5	**Sporting Kansas City**	**3–2**	**Philadelphia Union**	Kansas City, Kansas
18:00	Dwyer 16' de Jong (yellow card) 18'; Anibaba 91+'; Németh 94+'	Report	Peterson 3' (o.g.); Aristeguiesta 19'; Edu (yellow card) 62'; Carroll (yellow card) 68'	Stadium: Sporting Park; Attendance: 19,545; Referee: Ismail Elfath

April 11, 2015 6	**Sporting Kansas City**	**0–0**	**Real Salt Lake**	Kansas City, Kansas
19:30	Carrasco (yellow card) 61'	Report	Beltran (yellow card) 44'; Saborio (yellow card) 61'; Beckerman (yellow card) 64'; Mansally (yellow card) 80'	Stadium: Sporting Park; Attendance: 20,087; Referee: Jorge González

April 18, 2015 7	**LA Galaxy**	**2–1**	**Sporting Kansas City**	Carson, California
21:30	Husidic 9'; Gargan (yellow card) 32'; Juninho (yellow card) 83'; Gonzalez 94+'	Report	Németh 22'; Espinoza (yellow card) 30'; Dwyer (yellow card) 83'	Stadium: StubHub Center; Attendance: 20,018; Referee: Alan Kelly

April 25, 2015 8	**Houston Dynamo**	**4–4**	**Sporting Kansas City**	Houston, Texas
19:30	Barnes 11', 46'; Bruin 46+' (yellow card) 63'; Taylor (red card) 79'; Rodríguez 83'	Report	Németh 2'; Espinoza (yellow card) 31'; Anibaba (yellow card) 43'; Ellis (yellow card) 53'; Dwyer 74'; Feilhaber 80' (pen.), 95+'	Stadium: BBVA Compass Stadium; Attendance: 21,046; Referee: Kevin Stott

May 3, 2015 9	**Sporting Kansas City**	**1–0**	**Chicago Fire**	Kansas City, Kansas
16:00	Sinovic (yellow card) 38'; Nagamura 75' (yellow card) 92+'	Report	Adaílton (yellow card) 32'; Ritter (yellow card) 58'; Accam (red card) 89'	Stadium: Sporting Park; Attendance: 19,581; Referee: Jose Carlos Rivero

May 9, 2015 10	**D.C. United**	**1–1**	**Sporting Kansas City**	Washington, D.C.
18:00	Arnaud (yellow card) 41'; Arrieta 42'	Report	Espinoza (yellow card) 9'; Dwyer 45'; Marín (yellow card) 81'	Stadium: RFK Stadium; Attendance: 16,221; Referee: Armando Villarreal

May 16, 2015	**Colorado Rapids**	**Postponed**	**Sporting Kansas City**	Commerce City, Colorado
				Stadium: Dick's Sporting Goods Park

May 20, 2015 11	**Sporting Kansas City**	**4–2**	**New England Revolution**	Kansas City, Kansas
19:00	Dwyer 29' (yellow card) 37'; Feilhaber (yellow card) 30' (goal) 43' (pen.); Németh 39', 43'; Dia (yellow card) 71'; Mustivar (yellow card) 76'	Report	Agudelo 11'; Dorman (yellow card) 41'; Caldwell 64'; Goncalves (yellow card) 89'	Stadium: Sporting Park; Attendance: 18,864; Referee: Allen Chapman

May 23, 2015 12	**Seattle Sounders FC**	**0–0**	**Sporting Kansas City**	Seattle, Washington
21:00		Report	Ellis (yellow card) 81'; Mustivar (yellow card) 81'	Stadium: CenturyLink Field; Attendance: 40,653; Referee: Jair Marrufo

May 29, 2015 13	**Sporting Kansas City**	**4–0**	**FC Dallas**	Kansas City, Kansas
20:00	Németh 19'; Feilhaber 51'; Ellis 57'; Zusi 64'	Report	Loyd (yellow card) 33' (yellow-red card) 43'	Stadium: Sporting Park; Attendance: 20,172; Referee: Dave Gantar

June 6, 2015 14	**Sporting Kansas City**	**1–0**	**Seattle Sounders FC**	Kansas City, Kansas
19:30	Feilhaber 84' (pen.)	Report	Frei (yellow card) 82'	Stadium: Sporting Park; Attendance: 21,505; Referee: Ismail Elfath

June 21, 2015 15	**Real Salt Lake**	**2–1**	**Sporting Kansas City**	Sandy, Utah
21:00	Morales (yellow card) 15'; Jaime 15', (yellow card) 51'; Phillips (yellow card) 18'; Beckerman (yellow card) 47'; García 90+3', (yellow card) 90+3'	Report; Report	Mustivar (yellow card) 8'; Besler (yellow card) 14'; Dwyer 30'	Stadium: Rio Tinto Stadium; Attendance: 19,155; Referee: Drew Fischer

June 27, 2015 16	**Sporting Kansas City**	**2–0**	**Colorado Rapids**	Kansas City, Kansas
19:30	Nemeth 32'; Cronin 64' (o.g.); Dwyer (yellow card) 80'; Peterson (yellow card) 92'	Report	Watts (yellow card) 52'; Greenspan (yellow card) 61'; Doyle (yellow card) 70'	Stadium: Sporting Park; Attendance: 19,835; Referee: Baldomero Toledo

July 12, 2015 17	**Vancouver Whitecaps FC**	**0–1**	**Sporting Kansas City**	Vancouver, British Columbia
20:00	Feilhaber (yellow card) 20'; Ellis 52'; Mustivar (yellow card) 58'; Nemeth (yellow card) 86'; Dwyer (yellow card) 88'	Report	Waston (yellow card) 73'	Stadium: BC Place; Attendance: 21,000; Referee: Kevin Stott

July 18, 2015 18	**Sporting Kansas City**	**2–1**	**Montreal Impact**	Kansas City, Kansas
19:30	Feilhaber 4'; Dwyer 34'	Report	Piatti 59'; Donadel (yellow card) 84'	Stadium: Sporting Park; Attendance: 19,070; Referee: Ricardo Salazar

July 24, 2015 19	**Real Salt Lake**	**2–1**	**Sporting Kansas City**	Sandy, Utah
22:00	Morales 34'; Plata 73' (pen.) (yellow card) 90'; Vásquez (yellow card) 90'	Summary	Feilhaber 50' (yellow card) 90'; Melia (yellow card) 72'; Palmer-Brown (yellow card) 77'	Stadium: Rio Tinto Stadium; Attendance: 20,809; Referee: Allen Chapman

August 1, 2015 20	**Sporting Kansas City**	**1–1**	**Houston Dynamo**	Kansas City, Kansas
19:30	Dwyer 6' (yellow card) 45'; Besler (yellow card) 20'; Ellis (yellow card) 65'; Myers (yellow card) 76'	Summary	Deric (yellow card) 45'; Clark 78'; Torres (yellow card) 80'; Sturgis (red card) 86'	Stadium: Sporting Park; Attendance: 19,882; Referee: Jorge Gonzalez

August 8, 2015 21	**Toronto FC**	**1–3**	**Sporting Kansas City**	Toronto, Ontario
15:00	Bradley 22'; Warner (yellow card) 88'	Summary	Feilhaber 22' (pen.); Németh 29'; Peterson 87'	Stadium: BMO Field; Referee: Mark Geiger

August 15, 2015 22	**Sporting Kansas City**	**4–3**	**Vancouver Whitecaps FC**	Kansas City, Kansas
20:00	Ellis 53'; Dia (yellow card) 61'; Dwyer 81'; Nagamura 87', 95' (yellow card) 95'	Report	Manneh 9', 41'; Laba (yellow card) 64'; Morales 75'	Stadium: Sporting Park; Attendance: 19,969; Referee: Juan Guzman

August 19, 2015 23	**Sporting Kansas City**	**0–5**	**San Jose Earthquakes**	Kansas City, Kansas
19:30	Feilhaber (red card) 71'; Nemeth (yellow card) 74'	Report	Cato 3', 58'; Wondolowski 17' (pen.), 61'; Godoy 27'	Stadium: Sporting Park; Attendance: 18,866; Referee: Jair Marrufo

August 22, 2015 24	**Columbus Crew SC**	**3–2**	**Sporting Kansas City**	Columbus, Ohio
18:30	Finlay 35'; Tchani 80'; McInerney 88' (yellow card) 92+'	Report	de Jong 14'; Dwyer (yellow card) 33'; Medranda (yellow card) 39'; Zusi 62'; Lopez (yellow card) 79'	Stadium: MAPFRE Stadium; Attendance: 20,018; Referee: Chris Penso

August 29, 2015 25	**Colorado Rapids**	**2–1**	**Sporting Kansas City**	Commerce City, Colorado
20:00	Figueroa 53'; Sjöberg (yellow card) 58'; Sarvas (yellow card) 72'; Doyle 76'	Report	Abdul-Salaam (yellow card) 34'; Dwyer 47'; Sinovic (yellow card) 60'	Stadium: Dick's Sporting Goods Park; Attendance: 16,480; Referee: Jorge Gonzalez

September 9, 2015 26	**Portland Timbers**	**0–0**	**Sporting Kansas City**	Portland, Oregon
21:30	Melano (yellow card) 46+'	Report	Nagamura (yellow card) 40'; Peterson (yellow card) 48+'; Feilhaber (yellow card) 68'; Anor (yellow card) 94+'	Stadium: Providence Park; Attendance: 21,144; Referee: Fotis Bazakos

September 13, 2015 27	**Orlando City SC**	**3–1**	**Sporting Kansas City**	Orlando, Florida
18:00	Winter 3', 72'; Rochez 66'; Shea (yellow card) 83'	Report	Nemeth 59'; Besler (yellow card) 83'; Dwyer (red card) 87'	Stadium: Citrus Bowl; Attendance: 22,241; Referee: Jair Marrufo

September 18, 2015 28	**Sporting Kansas City**	**3–1**	**FC Dallas**	Kansas City, Kansas
18:00	Feilhaber 65', 76' (pen.); Dwyer 83'; Anor (yellow card) 86'	Report	Ulloa 80'	Stadium: Sporting Park; Attendance: 18,861; Referee: Mark Geiger

September 23, 2015 29	**Houston Dynamo**	**1–0**	**Sporting Kansas City**	Houston, Texas
19:30	Garcia (yellow card) 45' (yellow-red card) 70'; Bruin 67'	Report	Mustivar (yellow card) 33'; Besler (yellow card) 41'; Sinovic (yellow card) 56'; Feilhaber (yellow card) 88'	Stadium: BBVA Compass Stadium; Attendance: 18,037; Referee: Sorin Stoica

September 27, 2015 30	**Sporting Kansas City**	**1–1**	**Seattle Sounders FC**	Kansas City, Kansas
16:00	Nagamura (yellow card) 35'; Dwyer 80'; Palmer-Brown (yellow card) 82'	Report	Martins 32'; Alonso (yellow card) 44'	Stadium: Sporting Park; Attendance: 19,496; Referee: Armando Villarreal

October 3, 2015 31	**Portland Timbers**	**0–1**	**Sporting Kansas City**	Portland, Oregon
21:30	Adi (yellow card) 70'; Valeri (yellow card) 80'	Report	Feilhaber (yellow card) 74'; Németh 83'	Stadium: Providence Park; Attendance: 21,144; Referee: Ismail Elfath

October 16, 2015 32	**San Jose Earthquakes**	**1–0**	**Sporting Kansas City**	San Jose, California
22:00	Godoy 47' (yellow card) 67'	Report	Okugo (yellow card) 69'; Dwyer (yellow card) 82'	Stadium: Avaya Stadium; Attendance: 18,000; Referee: Kevin Stott

October 21, 2015 33	**Sporting Kansas City**	**0–2**	**Colorado Rapids**	Kansas City, Kansas
19:30	Németh (yellow card) 78'; Ellis (yellow card) 89'	Report	Powers 78'; Sarvas 86'	Stadium: Sporting Park; Attendance: 18,897; Referee: Fotis Bazakos

October 25, 2015 34	**Sporting Kansas City**	**2–1**	**LA Galaxy**	Kansas City, Kansas
18:00	Dwyer (yellow card) 17' (goal) 65'; Ellis 38'; Myers (yellow card) 58'; Nagamura (yellow card) 66'; Feilhaber (yellow card) 92+'	Report	DeLaGarza (yellow card) 24'; Keane 46+'	Stadium: Sporting Park; Attendance: 19,422; Referee: Mark Geiger

==== MLS Cup Playoffs ====
===== Bracket =====
Knockout round
October 29 – Stade Saputo
E6	Toronto FC	0
E3	**Montreal Impact**	3
October 28 – RFK Stadium
E5	New England Revolution	1
E4	**D.C. United**	2
October 29 – Providence Park
W6	Sporting Kansas City	2 (6)
W3	**Portland Timbers** (p)	2 (7)
October 28 – CenturyLink Field
W5	LA Galaxy	2
W4	**Seattle Sounders FC**	3

Conference semifinals
E3	Montreal Impact	2	1	3
E2	**Columbus Crew** (a.e.t.)	1	3	4
**Eastern Conference**
E4	D.C. United	0	0	0
E1	**New York Red Bulls**	1	1	2
W3	**Portland Timbers**	0	2	2
W2	Vancouver Whitecaps FC	0	0	0
**Western Conference**
W4	Seattle Sounders FC	2	1	3 (2)
W1	**FC Dallas** (p)	1	2	3 (4)

Conference finals
E2	**Columbus Crew**	2	0	2
E1	New York Red Bulls	0	1	1
W3	**Portland Timbers**	3	2	5
W1	FC Dallas	1	2	3

MLS Cup
December 6 – Mapfre Stadium
E2	Columbus Crew	1
W3	**Portland Timbers**	2

===== Results =====
====== Knockout round ======
October 29, 2015 Knockout Round	**Portland Timbers**	**2–2** (a.e.t.) (**7–6** p)	**Sporting Kansas City**	Providence Park, Portland, Oregon
21:00	Ridgewell (yellow card) 38'; Wallace (yellow card) 37' (goal) 57'; Fochive (yellow card) 107'; Urruti 118'	Report	Ellis (yellow card) 11' (goal) 87'; Dwyer (yellow card) 35'; Németh (yellow card) 76' (goal) 96'; Dia (yellow card) 76'; Abdul-Salaam (yellow card) 93'	Attendance: 21,144; Referee: Armando Villarreal
	**Penalties**
	Valeri (penalty missed); Borchers (penalty scored); Ridgewell (penalty scored); Jewsbury (penalty missed); Urruti (penalty scored); Villafaña (penalty missed); Asprilla (penalty scored); Nagbe (penalty scored); Powell (penalty missed); Fochive (penalty scored); Kwarasey (penalty scored)		(penalty scored) Feilhaber; (penalty missed) Dwyer; (penalty scored) Zusi; (penalty missed) Besler; (penalty scored) Nagamura; (penalty missed) Ellis; (penalty scored) Mustivar; (penalty scored) Peterson; (penalty missed) Abdul-Salaam; (penalty scored) Dia; (penalty missed) Kempin

=== U.S. Open Cup ===
Bracket

Fourth round June 16–17
**MLS**	**New York Red Bulls**	**3**
NASL	Atlanta Silverbacks	0
**NASL**	**New York Cosmos**	**2(4)**
MLS	New York City FC	2(3)
**MLS**	**Philadelphia Union**	**0(3)**
USL	Rochester Rhinos	0(1)
USL	Pittsburgh Riverhounds	1
**MLS**	**D.C. United**	**3***
**MLS**	**Chicago Fire**	**1***
USL	Louisville City FC	0
MLS	New England Revolution	0
**USL**	**Charlotte Independence**	**1**
USL	Charleston Battery	4(7)
**MLS**	**Orlando City SC**	**4(8)**
USL	Richmond Kickers	1
**MLS**	**Columbus Crew**	**3**
**MLS**	**Sporting Kansas City**	**1**
USL	Saint Louis FC	0
**MLS**	**FC Dallas**	**4**
USL	Oklahoma City Energy FC	1
**MLS**	**Houston Dynamo**	**2**
USL	Austin Aztex	0
**MLS**	**Colorado Rapids**	**4**
USL	Colorado Springs Switchbacks	1
**MLS**	**Real Salt Lake**	**2**
USL	Seattle Sounders FC 2	1
MLS	Seattle Sounders FC	1
**MLS**	**Portland Timbers**	**3***
**MLS**	**San Jose Earthquakes**	**2(6)**
USL	Sacramento Republic FC	2(5)
**MLS**	**LA Galaxy**	**6**
USASA	PSA Elite	1

Round of 16; June 30–July 1
**MLS**	**New York Red Bulls**	**4**
NASL	New York Cosmos	1
**MLS**	**Philadelphia Union**	**2**
MLS	D.C. United	1
**MLS**	**Chicago Fire**	**3**
USL	Charlotte Independence	1
**MLS**	**Orlando City SC**	**2**
MLS	Columbus Crew	0
**MLS**	**Sporting Kansas City**	**6**
MLS	FC Dallas	2
**MLS**	**Houston Dynamo**	**1**
MLS	Colorado Rapids	0
**MLS**	**Real Salt Lake**	**2**
MLS	Portland Timbers	0
MLS	San Jose Earthquakes	0
**MLS**	**LA Galaxy**	**1**

Quarterfinals; July 14–22
MLS	New York Red Bulls	1(3)
**MLS**	**Philadelphia Union**	**1(4)**
**MLS**	**Chicago Fire**	**3**
MLS	Orlando City SC	1
**MLS**	**Sporting Kansas City**	**3**
MLS	Houston Dynamo	1
**MLS**	**Real Salt Lake**	**1**
MLS	LA Galaxy	0

Semifinals; August 12
**MLS**	**Philadelphia Union**	**1**
MLS	Chicago Fire	0
**MLS**	**Sporting Kansas City**	**3**
MLS	Real Salt Lake	1

Final; September 30
MLS	Philadelphia Union	1(6)
**MLS**	**Sporting Kansas City**	**1(7)**

- Host team listed first
- **Bold** = winner
- * = after extra time, ( ) = penalty shootout score

June 16, 2015 Fourth round	**Sporting Kansas City**	**1–0**	**(Missouri) Saint Louis FC**	Kansas City, Kansas
19:30	Zusi 70'	SKC Report; MLS Report	Renken (yellow card) 87'	Stadium: Sporting Park; Attendance: 19,298 (Club USOC Record); Referee: Baboucarr Jallow

July 1, 2015 Fifth round	**Sporting Kansas City**	**6–2**	**(Texas) FC Dallas**	Kansas City, Kansas
19:30	Dwyer 5', 30', 41' (pen.), 69'; Németh 45+1', 59'	Report	Michel (yellow card) 15'; Barrios 62'; Zimmerman (yellow card) 68'; Acosta 73'	Stadium: Sporting Park; Attendance: 19,113; Referee: Robert Sibiga

July 21, 2015 Quarterfinals	**Sporting Kansas City**	**3–1**	**(Texas) Houston Dynamo**	Kansas City, Kansas
19:30	Mustivar (yellow card) 34'; Espinoza (yellow card) 68'; Feilhaber 71'; Dwyer 86'; Németh 88'	Report	Garrido (red card) 30'; Clark (yellow card) 57'; Bruin 59'; Davis (yellow card) 68'; Miranda (yellow card) 75'	Stadium: Sporting Park; Attendance: 17,589; Referee: Ted Unkel

August 12, 2015 Semifinals	**Sporting Kansas City**	**3–1**	**(Utah) Real Salt Lake**	Kansas City, Kansas
19:30	Nagamura (yellow card) 30'; Mustivar 35' (yellow card) 75'; Feilhaber 80'; Németh 85'	Report	García 24' (red card) 93+'; Beltran (yellow card) 76'	Stadium: Sporting Park; Attendance: 16,117; Referee: Armando Villarreal

September 30, 2015 Final	**Philadelphia Union (Pennsylvania)**	**1–1** (a.e.t.) (**6–7** p)	**Sporting Kansas City**	Chester, Pennsylvania
18:00	Lahound (yellow card) 21'; Le Toux 23'; Barnetta (yellow card) 58'; Sapong (yellow card) 91+'	Report	Ellis (yellow card) 29'; Sinovic (yellow card) 34'; Németh 65'; Quintillà (yellow card) 71'; Besler (yellow card) 86'; Nagamura (yellow card) 94'; Zusi (yellow card) 104'; Myers (yellow card) 106'	Stadium: PPL Park; Attendance: 14,463; Referee: Ted Unkel
	**Penalties**
	Le Toux (penalty scored); Nogueira (penalty scored); Edu (penalty missed); Barnetta (penalty scored); Casey (penalty scored); Lahound (penalty scored); Gaddis (penalty scored); Wenger (penalty missed)		Benny Feilhaber (penalty scored); Dwyer (penalty scored); Németh (penalty missed); Besler (penalty scored); Nagamura (penalty scored); Zusi (penalty scored); Ellis (penalty scored); Quintillà (penalty scored)
