= Sylvain Meslien =

French footballer (born 1980)

Personal information
- Date of birth: 7 August 1980 (age 46)
- Place of birth: Bondy, France
- Height: 1.78 m (5 ft 10 in)
- Position: Defender

Senior career*
Years	Team	Apps	(Gls)
1997–2006	Saint-Étienne (B team)		
2000–2006	Saint-Étienne	10	(0)
2004–2006	→ Troyes (loan)	9	(0)
2006–2007	Swansea City	1	(0)
2007–2008	Pau FC	18	(1)
2008–2012	Colmar	119	(1)
2012–2016	Saint-Louis Neuweg		
- * Club domestic league appearances and goals

Sylvain Meslien (born 7 August 1980) is a French former professional footballer who played as a defender. He played on the professional level in Ligue 1 for Saint-Étienne, Ligue 2 for Saint-Étienne and Troyes and in the Football League One for Swansea City.
