= Hôtel de Ville, Bondy =

Town hall in Bondy, France

Hôtel de Ville
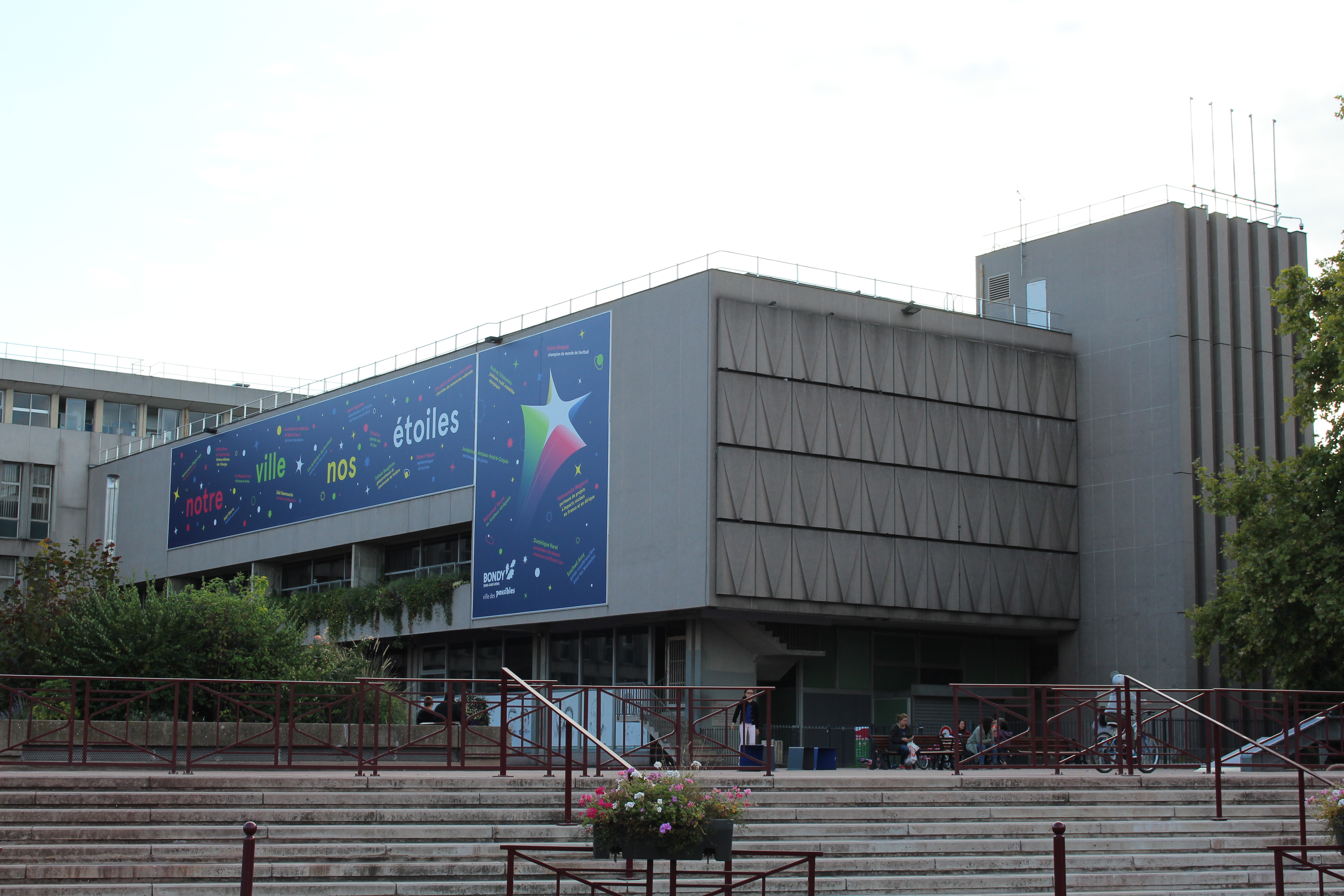
- The main frontage of the Hôtel de Ville in September 2019
- Interactive map of the Hôtel de Ville area

General information
- Type: City hall
- Architectural style: Brutalist style
- Location: Bondy, France
- Coordinates: 48.9018°N 2.4811°E
- Completed: 1969

Design and construction
- Architects: René Roux-Dufort and Noël Laval

The Hôtel de Ville (French pronunciation: [otɛl də vil], City Hall) is a municipal building in Bondy, Seine-Saint-Denis in the northeastern suburbs of Paris, standing on the Esplanade Claude-Fuzier.

== History ==
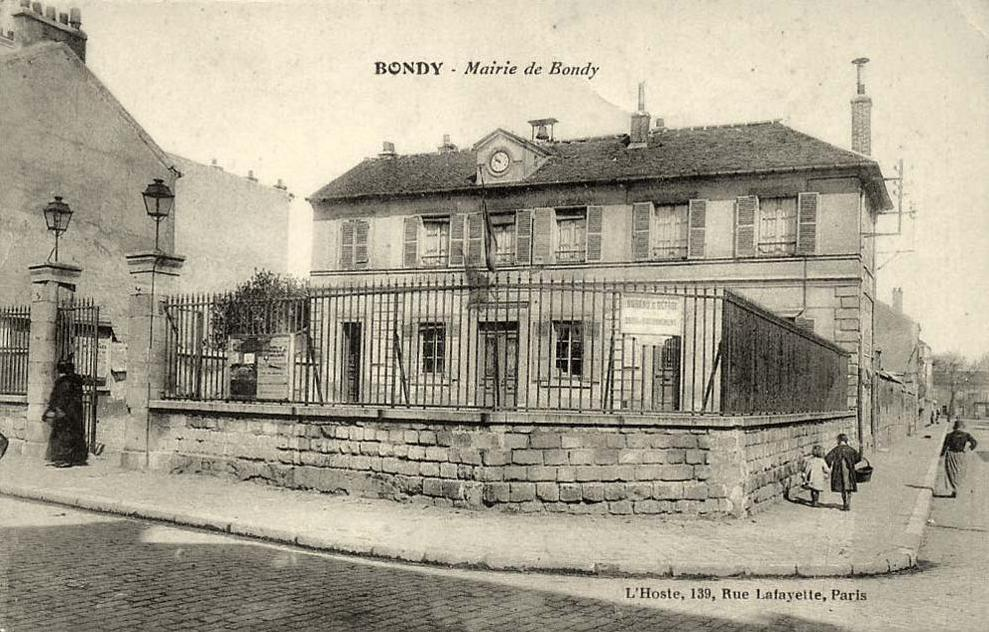
The first town hall

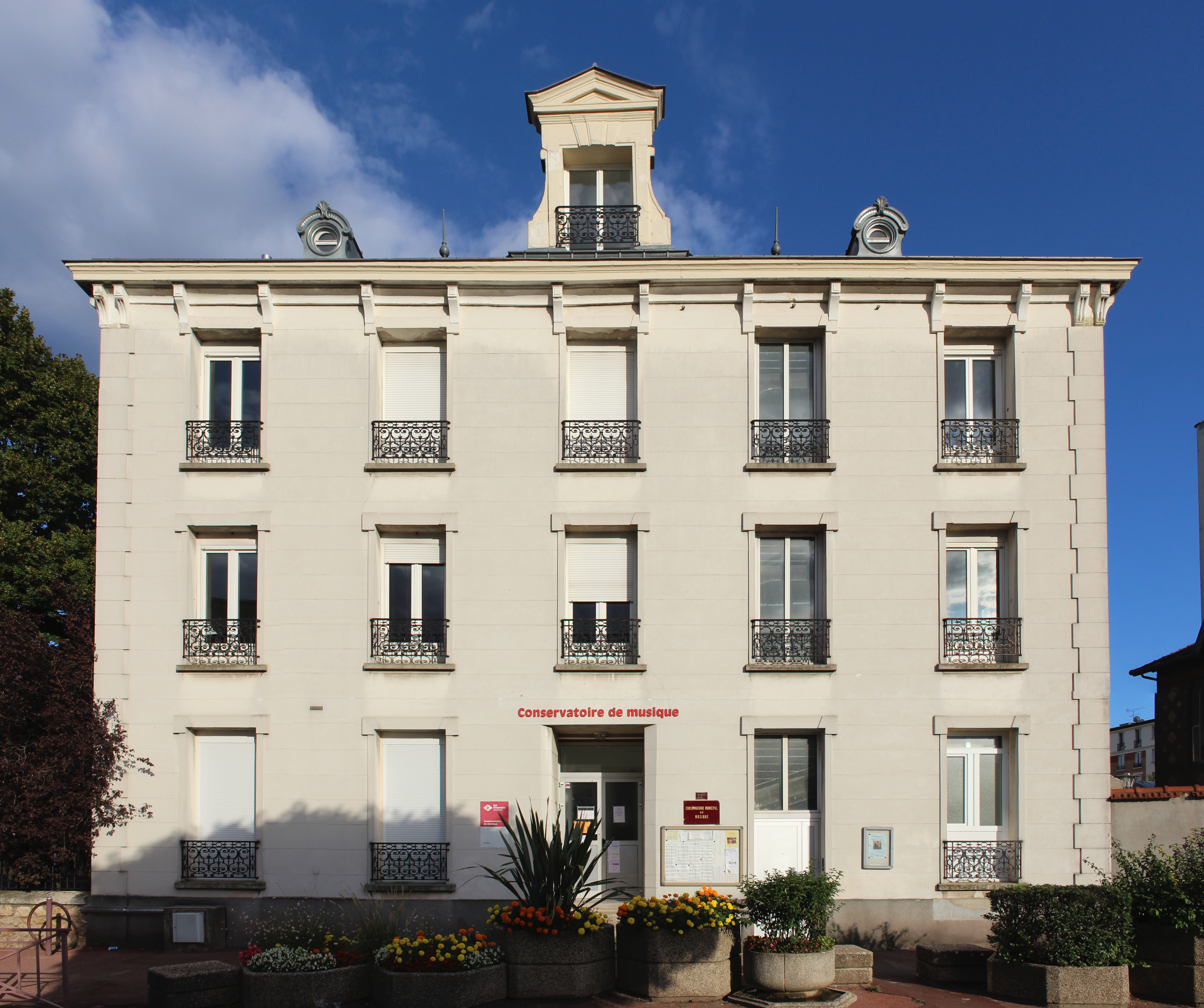
The second town hall (now the Conservatoire de Musique)

After the French Revolution, the town council initially held its meetings in the Church of St Peter, after mass had taken place, and then in private houses. In 1837, the council led by the mayor, Ambroise Gatine, decided to commission a dedicated town hall. The site they selected was No. 21 Rue Saint-Denis (now Rue Jules Guesde), facing l'Auberge du Cygne de la Croix (The Swan of the Cross Inn). The new building was designed in the neoclassical style, built in ashlar stone and was completed in 1838. The design involved an asymmetrical main frontage of six bays facing onto Rue Saint-Denis. The third bay on the left featured a square headed doorway on the ground floor, a sash window on the first floor and a clock above. The other bays were fenestrated in a similar style. Internally, the principal room was the Salle du Conseil (council chamber), which also served as the Salle des Mariages (wedding hall), on the ground floor. The town clerk's accommodation was on the first floor.

During the Franco-Prussian War in 1870, the council met on a temporary basis at No. 26 Rue Geoffroy L'Asnier in central Paris. This was a property owned by the mayor, Augustin Claude Étienne Polissard.

In the early 20th century, the council decided to purchase a larger property. The building they selected on Rue Médéric (now Rue Roger-Salengro) was owned by the Glaçon Tassart family. The council led by the mayor, Isidore Pontchy, completed in the purchase in June 1922. The building was subsequently converted for municipal use. The design involved a symmetrical main frontage of five bays facing onto Rue Médéric. The central bay featured a square-headed doorway on the ground floor; the building was fenestrated with casement windows on three floors. Internally, the principal room was the wedding hall on the first floor. The building later served as the Conservatoire de Musique (music conservatory).

During the Paris insurrection, part of the Second World War, members of the French Resistance seized the town hall on 18 August 1944. This was a week before the official liberation of the town by the French 2nd Armoured Division, commanded by General Philippe Leclerc, on 25 August 1944.

Following a significant increase in population in the first half of the 20th century, the town council decided to commission a modern town hall. The site they selected, on the south side of Rue Jules Guesde, served as a large necropolis between the 3rd and 5th centuries and later as a Carolingian village between the 9th and 11th centuries. The new building was designed by the municipal architect, René Roux-Dufort, and his colleague, Noël Laval, in the Brutalist style, built in concrete and glass and was officially opened by the mayor, Maurice Coutrot, on 23 March 1969. The design involved a wide set of steps leading up to an esplanade with a long three-storey office block in front, and a largely windowless concrete block containing the public facing areas on the right. Internally, the principal rooms include a large exhibition hall, named Espace Marcel Chauzy, to commemorate the life of the former conseiller general (regional councillor), Marcel Chauzy. The hall was opened by Hortensia Bussi on 26 September 1981.
