= Gündoğdu, Manavgat =

Gündoğdu
- Neighbourhood
- Location in Turkey
- Coordinates: 36.8531°N 31.2793°E
- Country: Turkey
- Province: Antalya
- District: Manavgat
- Population (2022): 2,082
- Time zone: UTC+3 (TRT)

Gündoğdu (Greek name before 1915: Prastos) is a neighbourhood in the municipality and district of Manavgat, Antalya Province, Turkey. Its population is 2,082 (2022). Before the 2013 reorganisation, it was a town (belde). It has many hotels and a long beach which end up at the harbor of Side.
