= Doriane Tahane =

French basketball player

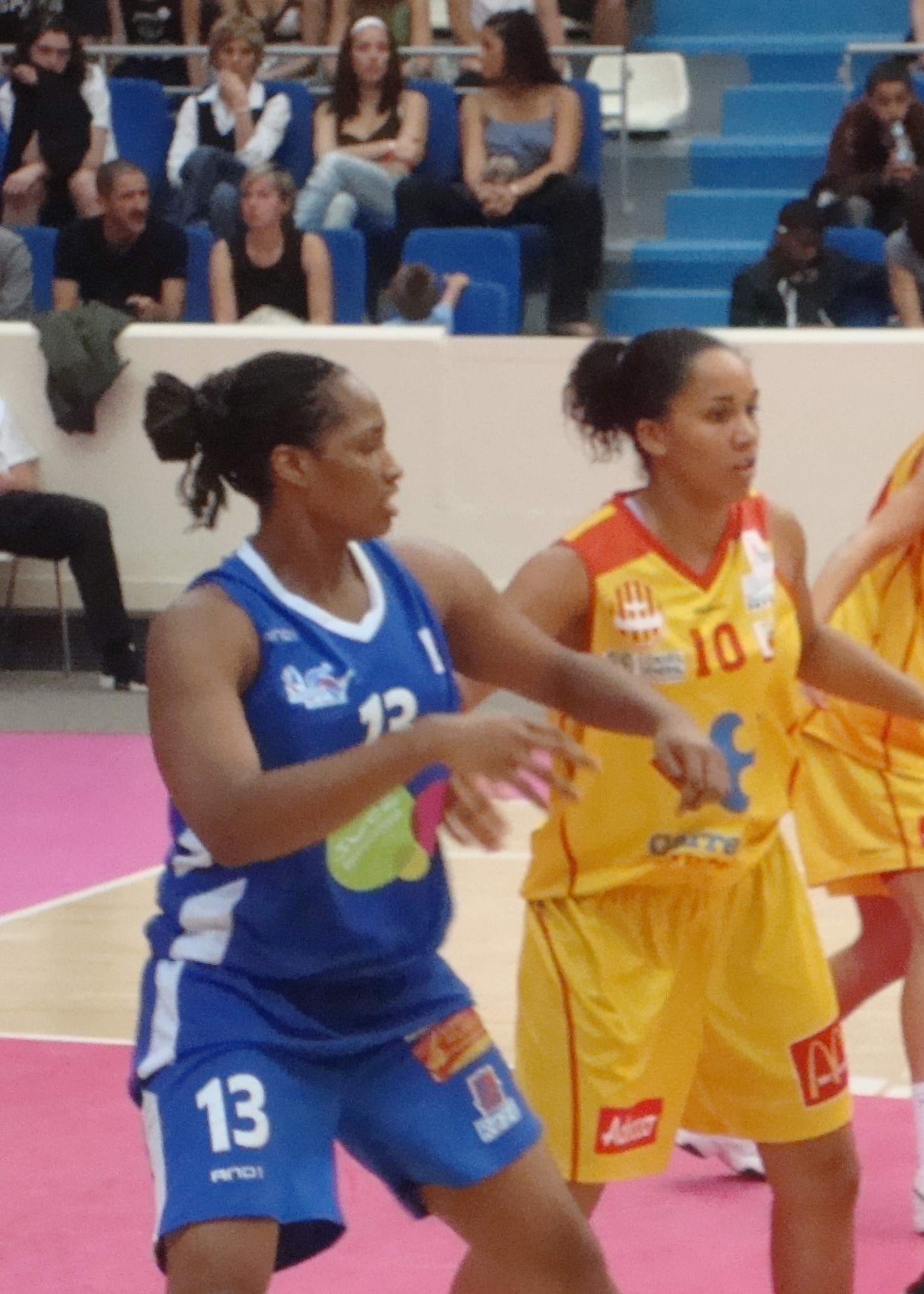
Doriane Tahane in 2009

Doriane Tahane (born October 14, 1989 in Nogent-sur-Marne, France) is a French basketball player who plays for the Cercle Saint-Paul Nantes Rezé Atlantique Basket of the Ligue Féminine de Basketball, the top women's French professional basketball league.
