= 2019–20 Gabala FC season =

Gabala
2019-20 season
- Chairman: Tale Heydarov
- Manager: Sanan Gurbanov (until 31 August); Elmar Bakhshiyev (Caretaker) (from 2 September)
- Stadium: Gabala City Stadium
- Premier League: 8th
- Azerbaijan Cup: Semifinal
- Europa League: Second Qualifying Round vs Dinamo Tbilisi
- Top goalscorer: League: Davit Volkovi (5); All: Davit Volkovi (7)
Home colours	Away colours

The 2019–20 season was Gabala FK's 15th season, and their 14th in the Azerbaijan Premier League, the top-flight of Azerbaijani football. Gabala will also take part in the Azerbaijan Cup and the Europa League. Gabala finished the season in 8th position due to the premature end of the season and were spared relegation, whilst they were due to play Zira in the Semifinal of the Azerbaijan Cup before its cancellation. In the Europa League Gabala were knocked out by Dinamo Tbilisi in the Second Qualifying Round.

== Season events ==
On 15 June, Gabala announced the signing of Kamal Mirzayev and Sadig Guliyev from Zira, with both players signing one-year contracts.

On 21 June, Gabala signed Fernań López to a one-year contract, with the option of an additional year, from Barakaldo.

On 27 June, Gabala signed Merab Gigauri to a one-year contract from Torpedo Kutaisi.

On 4 July, Gabala signed Christian Kouakou to a one-year contract, with the option of a second, from MFK Karviná.

On 10 July, Gabala signed Clésio to a one-year contract, with the option of a second, from İstanbulspor.

On 19 July, Gabala signed a six-month contract with Ivica Žunić.

On 23 August, new signing Kamal Mirzayev left the club to sign a one-year contract with Al-Salmiya of the Kuwait Premier League.

On 31 August, Sanan Gurbanov resigned as manager following Gabala's 4–0 defeat at home to Keşla.

On 2 September, Gabala announced that Elmar Bakhshiyev had been appointed as the club's caretaker manager.

On 31 October, Gabala announced the signing of Ibrahima Niasse on a contract until the end of the season.

On 7 January, Gabala announced the return of Ehtiram Shahverdiyev on a contract until the summer of 2021.

On 28 January, Niasse left Gabala to sign for PAS Lamia 1964.

On 30 January, Gabala announced the signing of Abdelrafik Gérard on an 18-month contract.

On 4 February, Gabala announced the signing of Nicolas Rajsel on an 18-month contract.

On 11 February, Gabala announced the signing of Rodrigo Gattas, on an 18-month contract.

On 20 February, Gabala announced that they had signed Yaovi Akakpo to a 2.5-year contract at the end of 2019.

On 13 March 2020, the Azerbaijan Premier League was postponed due to the COVID-19 pandemic.

On 21 May 2020, Gabala announced that Amin Seydiyev would leave the club at the end of the season to join Sabah.

On 4 June 2020, Gabala announced that youngsters Samir Maharramli and Idris Ingilabli would also leave the club at the end of the season to join Sabah.

On 19 June 2020, the AFFA announced that the 2019–20 season had been officially ended without the resumption of the remains matches due to the escalating situation of the COVID-19 pandemic in Azerbaijan.

== Squad ==
As of match played 7 March 2020

No.	Name	Nationality	Position	Date of birth (age)	Signed from	Signed in	Contract ends	Apps.	Goals
Goalkeepers
1	Anar Nazirov	(Azerbaijan)	GK	8 September 1985 (aged 34)	Zira	2019	2020	54	0
33	Müşfiq Nadirov	(Azerbaijan)	GK	24 May 2002 (aged 18)	Trainee	2020		0	0
94	Tarlan Ahmadli	(Azerbaijan)	GK	21 November 1994 (aged 25)	Sabah	2019		7	0
Defenders
2	Amin Seydiyev	(Azerbaijan)	DF	15 November 1998 (aged 21)	Trainee	2017		39	1
3	Ivica Žunić	(Croatia)	DF	11 September 1988 (aged 31)	Atyrau	2019		21	2
4	Sadig Guliyev	(Azerbaijan)	DF	9 March 1995 (aged 25)	Zira	2019	2020	28	0
5	Rasim Ramaldanov	(Azerbaijan)	DF	24 January 1986 (aged 34)	Kolkheti-1913 Poti	2017		39	1
20	Faig Hajiyev	(Azerbaijan)	DF	22 May 1999 (aged 21)	Trainee	2017		4	0
28	Murad Musayev	(Azerbaijan)	DF	13 June 1994 (aged 26)	Zira	2019		38	0
53	Khayal Muradov	(Azerbaijan)	DF	6 April 2001 (aged 19)	Trainee	2019		0	0
74	Yusif Nabiyev	(Azerbaijan)	DF	3 September 1997 (aged 22)	Trainee	2015		21	0
Midfielders
7	Roman Huseynov	(Azerbaijan)	MF	26 December 1997 (aged 22)	Trainee	2015		39	2
8	Qismət Alıyev	(Azerbaijan)	MF	24 October 1996 (aged 23)	Trainee	2014		81	1
9	Ehtiram Shahverdiyev	(Azerbaijan)	MF	1 October 1996 (aged 23)	Sumgayit	2020	2021	7	0
11	Asif Mammadov	(Azerbaijan)	MF	5 August 1986 (aged 33)	Inter Baku	2015		143+	12
12	Abdelrafik Gérard	(France)	MF	8 June 1993 (aged 27)	Union SG	2020	2021	4	0
17	Yaovi Akakpo	(Togo)	MF	11 March 1999 (aged 21)		2019	2022	1	0
19	Rovlan Muradov	(Azerbaijan)	MF	28 March 1998 (aged 22)	Trainee	2017		23	4
21	Fernań López	(Spain)	MF	10 February 1995 (aged 25)	Barakaldo	2019	2020	22	3
55	Idris Ingilabli	(Azerbaijan)	MF	6 October 2001 (aged 18)	Trainee	2019		4	0
77	Merab Gigauri	(Georgia (country))	MF	5 January 1993 (aged 27)	Torpedo Kutaisi	2019	2020	22	0
Forwards
10	Clésio	(Mozambique)	FW	11 October 1994 (aged 25)	İstanbulspor	2019	2020	22	3
14	Ulvi Isgandarov	(Azerbaijan)	FW	17 April 1998 (aged 22)	Trainee	2017		22	5
22	Rodrigo Gattas	(Chile)	FW	2 December 1991 (aged 28)	York9	2020	2021	2	0
32	Nicolas Rajsel	(Slovenia)	FW	31 May 1993 (aged 27)	KV Oostende	2020	2021	4	4
Out on loan
17	James Adeniyi	(Nigeria)	FW	20 December 1992 (aged 27)	Skënderbeu Korçë	2018	2021	31	12
77	Samir Gurbanov	(Azerbaijan)	MF	21 March 2001 (aged 19)	Trainee	2018		1	0
Left during the season
6	Kamal Mirzoyev	(Azerbaijan)	MF	14 September 1994 (aged 25)	Zira	2019	2020	5	0
6	Ibrahima Niasse	(Senegal)	MF	18 April 1988 (aged 32)	Raja Casablanca	2019	2020	40	1
9	Davit Volkovi	(Georgia (country))	FW	3 June 1995 (aged 25)	Saburtalo Tbilisi	2019	2019	34	10
13	Christian Kouakou	(Ivory Coast)	FW	1 March 1991 (aged 29)	MFK Karviná	2019	2020	6	0
15	Vusal Masimov	(Azerbaijan)	DF	3 April 2000 (aged 20)	Trainee	2019		0	0
22	Rustam Nuruyev	(Azerbaijan)	DF	6 March 2000 (aged 20)	Trainee	2019		0	0
30	Elmaddin Sultanov	(Azerbaijan)	GK	7 May 2001 (aged 19)	Trainee	2019		0	0
	Veysal Rzayev	(Azerbaijan)	MF	24 October 2002 (aged 17)	Trainee	2019		0	0

=== Out on loan ===
Note: Flags indicate national team as defined under FIFA eligibility rules; some limited exceptions apply. Players may hold more than one non-FIFA nationality.

No. / Pos. / Nation / Player; — / MF / AZE / Samir Gurbanov (at Viktoria Žižkov until 30 June 2021)	No. / Pos. / Nation / Player; — / FW / NGR / James Adeniyi (at Hapoel Ironi Kiryat Shmona until 30 June 2020)

== Transfers ==
=== In ===
Date	Position	Nationality	Name	From	Fee	Ref.
Summer 2019	GK	(Azerbaijan)	Tarlan Ahmadli	Sabah	Undisclosed	
Summer 2019	DF	(Azerbaijan)	Murad Musayev	Zira	Undisclosed	
15 June 2019	DF	(Azerbaijan)	Sadig Guliyev	Zira	Undisclosed	
15 June 2019	MF	(Azerbaijan)	Kamal Mirzayev	Zira	Undisclosed	
21 June 2019	MF	(Spain)	Fernań López	Barakaldo	Undisclosed	
27 June 2019	MF	(Georgia (country))	Merab Gigauri	Torpedo Kutaisi	Undisclosed	
4 July 2019	FW	(Ivory Coast)	Christian Kouakou	MFK Karviná	Undisclosed	
10 July 2019	FW	(Mozambique)	Clésio	İstanbulspor	Undisclosed	
19 July 2019	DF	(Croatia)	Ivica Žunić	Atyrau	Undisclosed	
31 October 2019	MF	(Senegal)	Ibrahima Niasse	Raja Casablanca	Undisclosed	
7 January 2020	MF	(Azerbaijan)	Ehtiram Shahverdiyev	Sumgayit	Free	
30 January 2020	MF	(France)	Abdelrafik Gérard	Union SG	Undisclosed	
4 February 2020	FW	(Slovenia)	Nicolas Rajsel	KV Oostende	Undisclosed	
11 February 2020	FW	(Chile)	Rodrigo Gattas	York9	Undisclosed	
20 February 2020†	MF	(Togo)	Yaovi Akakpo		Undisclosed	

† Transfer announced on the above date.

=== Out ===
Date	Position	Nationality	Name	To	Fee	Ref.
26 June 2019	DF	(Azerbaijan)	Bahlul Mustafazade	Sabah	Undisclosed	
9 July 2019	MF	(Azerbaijan)	Abbas Aghazade	Sabah	Undisclosed	
23 August 2019	MF	(Azerbaijan)	Kamal Mirzayev	Al-Salmiya	Undisclosed	
1 January 2020	GK	(Azerbaijan)	Elmaddin Sultanov	Kapaz	Undisclosed	
1 January 2020	DF	(Azerbaijan)	Vusal Masimov	Turan-Tovuz	Undisclosed	
1 January 2020	DF	(Azerbaijan)	Rustam Nuruyev	Turan-Tovuz	Undisclosed	
1 January 2020	MF	(Azerbaijan)	Veysal Rzayev	Turan-Tovuz	Undisclosed	
28 January 2020	MF	(Senegal)	Ibrahima Niasse	PAS Lamia 1964	Undisclosed	
21 May 2020†	DF	(Azerbaijan)	Amin Seydiyev	Sabah	Undisclosed	
4 June 2020†	MF	(Azerbaijan)	Samir Maharramli	Sabah	Undisclosed	
4 June 2020†	MF	(Azerbaijan)	Idris Ingilabli	Sabah	Undisclosed	

† Transfer announced on the above date, coming into effect at the end of the season.

=== Loans out ===
Date from	Position	Nationality	Name	To	Date to	Ref.
July 2019	FW	(Nigeria)	James Adeniyi	Hapoel Ironi Kiryat Shmona	End of Season	
16 July 2019	MF	(Azerbaijan)	Samir Gurbanov	Viktoria Žižkov	End of 2020/21 Season	

=== Released ===
Date	Position	Nationality	Name	Joined	Date
Summer 2019	GK	(Azerbaijan)	Murad Popov		
Summer 2019	MF	(Azerbaijan)	Ilgar Gurbanov	Sumgayit	20 August 2019
1 June 2019	MF	(Azerbaijan)	Javid Huseynov	Zira	1 June 2019
3 June 2019	MF	(Azerbaijan)	Elvin Jamalov	Zira	3 June 2019
4 June 2019	DF	(Azerbaijan)	Urfan Abbasov	Sabail	4 June 2019
4 June 2019	MF	(Togo)	Lalawélé Atakora	Kazma	
4 June 2019	MF	(Albania)	Sabien Lilaj	Sektzia Nes Tziona	
4 June 2019	FW	(France)	Steeven Joseph-Monrose	Neftçi	16 June 2019
31 December 2019	FW	(Georgia (country))	Davit Volkovi	Zira	1 January 2020
1 January 2020	FW	(Ivory Coast)	Christian Kouakou	Bangladesh Police	
30 June 2020	DF	(Azerbaijan)	Khayal Muradov	Sabah	
30 June 2020	DF	(Croatia)	Ivica Žunić	CFR Cluj	22 November 2020
30 June 2020	MF	(France)	Abdelrafik Gérard		
30 June 2020	MF	(Spain)	Fernań López	Jagiellonia	19 September 2020
30 June 2020	FW	(Mozambique)	Clésio	Zira	18 July 2020

=== Trial ===
Date From	Date To	Position	Nationality	Name	Last club	Ref.
December 2019		MF	(Togo)	Yaovi Akakpo		
January 2020		FW	(Brazil)	Kayo Manoel		

== Friendlies ==
29 June 2019	Zira	1 – 1	Gabala	Baku
AZT (UTC+4)	M.Musayev 6' (o.g.)	Report	M.Musayev 57'	Stadium: Zira Olympic Sport Complex Stadium

7 July 2019	Gabala (Azerbaijan)	2 – 1	(Ukraine) Mariupol	Bolu, Turkey
18:30 AZT (UTC+4)	Isgandarov 2'; R.Huseynov 17'	Report	Fomin 34' (pen.)	Stadium: Hendek Atatürk Stadium

11 July 2019	Gabala (Azerbaijan)	1 – 3	(Ukraine) Vorskla Poltava	Bolu, Turkey
12:00 AZT (UTC+4)	Isgandarov 41'	Report	Goal	Stadium: Koru Hotel Stadium

17 July 2019	Gabala (Azerbaijan)	2 – 1	(Turkey) Boluspor	Bolu, Turkey
AZT (UTC+4)	Gigauri 19'; Clésio 47'	Report	Goal	Stadium: Koru Hotel Stadium

5 August 2019	Gabala (Azerbaijan)	2 – 0	(Kuwait) Al-Salmiya	Baku
AZT (UTC+4)	Mammadov 70'; López 87'	Report		Stadium: Baku Olympic Stadium

16 November 2019	Sabail	2 – 3	Gabala	Baku
AZT (UTC+4)	Erico 15'; E.Yagublu 56' (pen.)	Report	Mammadov 41'; S.Guliyev 43'; S.Maharramli 70'	Stadium: ASCO Arena

10 January 2020	Gabala	4 – 0	MOIK Baku	Baku
15:00 AZT (UTC+4)	Isgandarov 27'; López 65'; Clésio 86'; Muradov 88'	Report		Stadium: Baku Olympic Reserve Stadium

14 January 2020	Gabala (Azerbaijan)	0 – 3	(Hungary) MTK Budapest	Belek, Turkey
AZT (UTC+4)		Report	Goal	Stadium: Caravanserai Hotel

18 January 2020	Gabala (Azerbaijan)	3 – 0	(Russia) Chayka Peschanokopskoye	Belek, Turkey
AZT (UTC+4)	Žunić 14'; Muradov 35'; Isgandarov 51'	Report

22 January 2020	Gabala (Azerbaijan)	0 – 0	(Bulgaria) Etar Veliko Tarnovo	Belek, Turkey
AZT (UTC+4)		Report

25 January 2020	Gabala (Azerbaijan)	2 – 2	(Romania) Concordia Chiajna	Belek, Turkey
AZT (UTC+4)	Mammadov 21'; A.Seydiyev 52'	Report	28'; 81'

10 June 2020	Sumgayit	2 – 2	Gabala	Baku
AZT (UTC+4)	E.Jafarguliyev 8'; Yunanov 73'	Report	R.Huseynov 43'; Rajsel 60' (pen.)	Stadium: Kapital Bank Arena

14 June 2020	Neftçi	2 – 1	Gabala	Baku
20:00 AZT (UTC+4)	Abbasov 41'; Dário 63'	Report	Muradov 26'	Stadium: Eighth Kilometer District Stadium

== Competitions ==
=== Premier League ===
==== Results summary ====
Overall								Home						Away					
Pld	W	D	L	GF	GA	GD	Pts	W	D	L	GF	GA	GD	W	D	L	GF	GA	GD
20	5	4	11	25	35	−10	19	3	1	6	14	16	−2	2	3	5	11	19	−8

Last updated: 7 March 2020.
Source: See Results

==== Results by round ====
Round	1	2	3	4	5	6	7	8	9	10	11	12	13	14	15	16	17	18	19	20
Ground	H	A	H	A	A	H	A	H	A	H	H	A	H	A	H	A	A	H	A	H
Result	L	L	L	W	D	L	D	D	L	L	W	L	W	D	L	L	L	L	W	W
Position	8	8	8	7	7	8	7	7	8	8	8	8	7	7	7	8	8	8	8	8

Updated to match(es) played on 7 March 2020. Source: See Results
A = Away; H = Home; W = Win; D = Draw; L = Loss

==== Results ====
17 August 2019 1	Gabala	0 – 2	Sumgayit	Qabala
19:00 AZT (UTC+4)	Mammadov (yellow card) 26' (yellow-red card) 84'; Gigauri (yellow card) 54'; Ramaldanov (yellow card) 84'; S.Guliyev (yellow card) 90'	Report	Sharifi 13', 29' (yellow card) 70'; Babaei (yellow card) 40'; Agayev (yellow card) 60'; Mustafayev (yellow card) 84'; Jannatov (yellow card) 86'	Stadium: Gabala City Stadium; Attendance: 500; Referee: Rauf Jabbarov

25 August 2019 2	Qarabağ	3 – 0	Gabala	Baku
21:00 AZT (UTC+4)	Richard (yellow card) 18' (goal) 62' (pen.); Abdullayev (yellow card) 55'; Gueye 63'; Zoubir 80'	Report	Isgandarov (yellow card) 45+2'	Stadium: Azersun Arena; Attendance: 1,300; Referee: İnqilab Məmmədov

31 August 2019 3	Gabala	0 – 4	Keşla	Qabala
18:30 AZT (UTC+4)	A.Seydiyev (yellow card) 63'	Report	S.Alkhasov 10'; Isgandarli (yellow card) 31'; T.Bayramli 39'; Frutos 45+1', 90+1'; Flores (yellow card) 53'	Stadium: Gabala City Stadium; Attendance: 150; Referee: Aliyar Aghayev

14 September 2019 4	Sabah	0 – 1	Gabala	Masazır
20:00 AZT (UTC+4)	Rojas (yellow card) 25'; Eyyubov (yellow card) 45+3'; Diniyev (yellow card) 64'; M.Isayev (yellow card) 81'	Report	Isgandarov (yellow card) 45+3'; R.Huseynov 47'; López (yellow card) 49'; Nazirov (yellow card) 52'; Žunić (yellow card) 77'	Stadium: Alinja Arena; Attendance: 1,000; Referee: Vuqar Həsənli

21 September 2019 5	Sabail	1 – 1	Gabala	Baku
19:45 AZT (UTC+4)	Rahimov (yellow card) 58'; Mirab.Abbasov 68' (yellow card) 89'	Report	Muradov 17'; López (yellow card) 45+2'; Žunić (yellow card) 56'; Gigauri (yellow card) 64'; R.Huseynov (yellow card) 71'; F.Hajiyev (yellow card) 88'; Q.Alıyev (yellow card) 90+2'	Stadium: Bayil Arena; Attendance: 500; Referee: Aliyar Aghayev

28 September 2019 6	Gabala	0 – 3	Neftçi	Qabala
17:00 AZT (UTC+4)	Gigauri (yellow card) 16'; A.Seydiyev (yellow card) 48'; Žunić (yellow card) 53'	Report	Mahmudov (yellow card) 14'; Akhundov 59'; Petrov (yellow card) 66'; R.Aliyev 73'; Joseph-Monrose 89'	Stadium: Gabala City Stadium; Attendance: 600; Referee: Kamal Umudlu

6 October 2019 7	Zira	1 – 1	Gabala	Zirə
18:00 AZT (UTC+4)	I.Muradov 67'; Mammadov (yellow card) 74'	Report	López (yellow card) 40'; Q.Alıyev (yellow card) 60'; Isgandarov 65'; Nazirov (yellow card) 90+1'	Stadium: Zira Olympic Sport Complex Stadium; Attendance: 1,000; Referee: Ingilab Məmmədov

20 October 2019 8	Gabala	1 – 1	Qarabağ	Qabala
17:00 AZT (UTC+4)	Q.Alıyev 3' (yellow card) 70'; Gigauri (yellow card) 34'; Mammadov (yellow card) 45+3'; R.Huseynov (yellow card) 57'; A.Seydiyev (yellow card) 67'; López (yellow card) 87'	Report	I.Ibrahimli 9' (yellow card) 90+1'; Zoubir (yellow card) 87'	Stadium: Gabala City Stadium; Attendance: 1,000; Referee: Aliyar Aghayev

2 November 2019 9	Keşla	2 – 1	Gabala	Baku
16:00 AZT (UTC+4)	Frutos 1'; Meza 42' (yellow card) 45'	Report	R.Huseynov (yellow card) 30'; Volkovi 58'; M.Musayev (yellow card) 90+5'	Stadium: Bayil Arena; Attendance: 500; Referee: Rauf Jabbarov
Note: Match played at the Bayil Arena in Baku, instead of Keşla's regular ASK Arena in Baku.

3 November 2019 10	Gabala	1 – 2	Sabah	Qabala
17:00 AZT (UTC+4)	Volkovi 43'	Report	Imamverdiyev (yellow card) 5' (goal) 54'; Ekstein 73'; Mirzabeyov (yellow card) 78'; M.Isayev (yellow card) 84'; Stamenković (yellow card) 90+5'	Stadium: Gabala City Stadium; Attendance: 350; Referee: Rahim Hasanov

9 November 2019 11	Gabala	3 – 0	Sabail	Qabala
15:00 AZT (UTC+4)	Volkovi 22', 45+2'; Clésio (yellow card) 44'; Isgandarov 90+2'	Report	T.Manafov (yellow card) 47'; Ramazanov (yellow card) 50'; Yunuszade (yellow card) 74'; A.Sadixov (red card) 80'	Stadium: Gabala City Stadium; Attendance: 180; Referee: Elcin Masiyev

24 November 2019 12	Neftçi	4 – 1	Gabala	Baku
17:00 AZT (UTC+4)	Mustivar 17'; Buludov 24'; Joseph-Monrose 35'; Platellas 90+1'	Report	F.Hajiyev (yellow card) 61'; Gigauri (yellow card) 67'; López (yellow card) 68'; Guerrier 90+5' (o.g.)	Stadium: Eighth Kilometer District Stadium; Attendance: 450; Referee: Kamal Umudlu

30 November 2019 13	Gabala	3 – 0	Zira	Qabala
15:00 AZT (UTC+4)	Muradov 13' (yellow card) 64'; A.Seydiyev (yellow card) 16'; López 42' (yellow card) 59'; Volkovi (yellow card) 66' (goal) 70'; Nazirov (yellow card) 82'	Report	Jamalov (yellow card) 45+2'; Scarlatache (yellow card) 45+4'; Kgaswane (yellow card) 78'	Stadium: Gabala City Stadium; Attendance: 400; Referee: Ravan Hamzazada

8 December 2019 14	Sumgayit	1 – 1	Gabala	Sumqayit
15:00 AZT (UTC+4)	Babaei 31' (pen.) (yellow card) 64'; K.Najafov (yellow card) 45'; E.Jafarguliyev (yellow card) 85'	Report	López (yellow card) 20' (goal) 23'; Gigauri (yellow card) 45'; Q.Alıyev (yellow card) 45' (yellow-red card) 86'; Nazirov (red card) 65'; Niasse (yellow card) 86'	Stadium: Kapital Bank Arena; Attendance: 1,100; Referee: Vuqar Həsənli

2 February 2020 15	Gabala	1 – 2	Keşla	Qabala
15:00 AZT (UTC+4)	Žunić 60'} S.Guliyev (yellow card) 63'; Gérard (yellow card) 90+3'; Isgandarov (yellow card) 90+5'	Report	Bojović 35'; Meza 40' (yellow card) 88'; Kamara (yellow card) 57'; Frutos (yellow card) 67'; T.Bayramli (yellow card) 90+4'; Gadoyev (yellow card) 90+7'	Stadium: Gabala City Stadium; Attendance: 200; Referee: Sabuhi Bayramov

7 February 2020 16	Sabah	3 – 2	Gabala	Masazır
19:00 AZT (UTC+4)	Dević 19'; Marina 22'; Khalilzade (yellow card) 31'; E.Shahverdiyev 64' (o.g.); Mustafazade (yellow card) 90'	Report	Isgandarov 5'; Mammadov (yellow card) 28'; Muradov (yellow card) 38'; Rajsel (yellow card) 85' (goal) 90+2' (pen.)	Stadium: Alinja Arena; Attendance: 400; Referee: Ravan Hamzazada

16 February 2020 17	Sabail	3 – 1	Gabala	Baku
16:30 AZT (UTC+4)	Amirguliyev (yellow card) 52'; M.Abbasov 57'; R.Hacıyev (yellow card) 61'; R.Aliyev 70'; Ekstein 82' (pen.)	Report	Rajsel 16'; Clésio (yellow card) 55'; López (yellow card) 61' (yellow-red card) 75'; Nazirov (yellow card) 81'	Stadium: Bayil Arena; Attendance: 300; Referee: Kamal Umudlu

22 February 2020 18	Gabala	0 – 2	Neftçi	Qabala
15:00 AZT (UTC+4)	I.Ingilabli (yellow card) 6'; S.Guliyev (yellow card) 86'; Muradov (yellow card) 90+2'	Report	Krivotsyuk 8'; Dabo 14' (yellow card) 80'	Stadium: Gabala City Stadium; Attendance: 400; Referee: Aliyar Aghayev

1 March 2020 19	Zira	1 – 2	Gabala	Zirə
15:00 AZT (UTC+4)	I.Muradov 21'; Volkovi (yellow card) 34'; Zogović (yellow card) 71'; N.Suleymanov (yellow card) 74'; Scarlatache (yellow card) 87'	Report	Mammadov (yellow card) 27'; López 79'; Ahmadli (yellow card) 80'; Muradov 88'	Stadium: Zira Olympic Sport Complex Stadium; Attendance: 200; Referee: Orkhan Məmmədov

7 March 2020 20	Gabala	5 – 0	Sumgayit	Qabala
16:00 AZT (UTC+4)	Gigauri (yellow card) 33'; Rajsel 34', 89' (pen.) (yellow card) 59'; A.Seydiyev 37'; Muradov 52'; Žunić 63'	Report	Mustafayev (yellow card) 23'; S.Aliyev (yellow card) 87'	Stadium: Gabala City Stadium; Attendance: 250; Referee: Rahim Hasanov

13 March 2020 21	Qarabağ	–	Gabala	Baku
AZT (UTC+4)				Stadium: Azersun Arena
Note: Match postponed on 13 March due to the COVID-19 pandemic.

21 March 2020 22	Gabala	–	Sabah	Baku
AZT (UTC+4)				Stadium: Eighth Kilometer District Stadium
Note: Match postponed on 13 March due to the COVID-19 pandemic.

==== League table ====
Pos	Team	Pld	W	D	L	GF	GA	GD	Pts	Qualification or relegation
4	Sumgayit	20	6	5	9	24	32	−8	23	Qualification for the Europa League first qualifying round
5	Zira	20	6	5	9	25	37	−12	23	
6	Sabah	20	5	6	9	19	27	−8	21	
7	Sabail	20	5	5	10	16	30	−14	20	
8	Gabala	20	5	4	11	25	35	−10	19	

Source: Soccerway
Rules for classification: 1) Points; 2) Head-to-head points; 3) Head-to-head goal difference; 4) Head-to-head goals scored; 5) Head-to-head away goals scored (only if two teams); 6) Goal difference; 7) Goals scored.

=== Azerbaijan Cup ===
15 December 2019 Quarterfinal 1st leg	Gabala	3 – 0	Sabah	Qabala
15:00 AZT (UTC+4)	Clésio 19', 43'; Q.Alıyev (yellow card) 30'; Volkovi (yellow card) 57'; Isgandarov 87' (yellow card) 89' (yellow-red card) 90+3'	Report	U.Diallo (yellow card) 16'; A.Diallo (yellow card) 45+1'; K.Diniyev (yellow card) 57'; Diniyev (yellow card) 75'	Stadium: Gabala City Stadium; Attendance: 400; Referee: Ingilab Mammadov

19 December 2019 Quarterfinal 2nd leg	Sabah	2 – 3 (2 – 6 agg.)	Gabala	Masazır
18:00 AZT (UTC+4)	S.Seyidov (yellow card) 38'; Khalilzade (yellow card) 60'; Mustafazade 62', 76'; Diniyev (yellow card) 90+2'	Report	Volkovi 22', 23'; Clésio 64'; Muradov (yellow card) 67'; Nabiyev (yellow card) 76'	Stadium: Alinja Arena; Attendance: 700; Referee: Aliyar Aghayev

22 April 2020 Semifinal 1st leg	Gabala	–	Zira	Qabala
AZT (UTC+4)				Stadium: Gabala City Stadium
Note: Match postponed due to the COVID-19 pandemic

29 April 2020 Semifinal 2nd leg	Zira	– (– agg.)	Gabala	Zirə
AZT (UTC+4)				Stadium: Zira Olympic Sport Complex Stadium
Note: Match postponed due to the COVID-19 pandemic

=== UEFA Europa League ===
==== Qualifying rounds ====
25 July 2019 Second qualifying round 1st leg	Gabala (Azerbaijan)	0 – 2	(Georgia (country)) Dinamo Tbilisi	Qabala, Azerbaijan
19:00 AZST (UTC+4)	López (yellow card) 5'; Clésio (yellow card) 6'; Gigauri (yellow card) 39'; Ramaldanov (yellow card) 45+3'; Volkovi (yellow card) 58'; Kouakou (yellow card) 90+1'	Report	Kutalia 41' (yellow card) 62'; Kavtaradze (yellow card) 45+3'; Shengelia (yellow card) 60'; Papava (yellow card) 66'; Kardava (yellow card) 74'; Daffé 87'	Stadium: Gabala City Stadium; Attendance: 2,800; Referee: Nick Walsh (Scotland)

1 August 2019 Second qualifying round 2nd leg	Dinamo Tbilisi (Georgia (country))	3 – 0 (5 – 0 agg.)	(Azerbaijan) Gabala	Tbilisi, Georgia
21:00 AZST (UTC+4)	Mongil (yellow card) 28'; Shengelia 68', 88'; Karikari 90+3'	Report	Q.Alıyev (yellow card) 46'; Ramaldanov (yellow card) 54'	Stadium: Boris Paichadze Dinamo Arena; Attendance: 8,153; Referee: Petri Viljanen (Finland)

== Squad statistics ==
As of Match played 7 March 2020

=== Appearances and goals ===
No.	Pos	Nat	Player	Total		Premier League		Azerbaijan Cup		Europa League	
No.	Pos	Nat	Player	Apps	Goals	Apps	Goals	Apps	Goals	Apps	Goals
1	GK	(Azerbaijan) AZE	Anar Nazirov	19	0	15	0	2	0	2	0
2	DF	(Azerbaijan) AZE	Amin Seydiyev	23	1	19	1	2	0	2	0
3	DF	(Croatia) CRO	Ivica Žunić	21	2	17	2	2	0	2	0
4	DF	(Azerbaijan) AZE	Sadig Guliyev	10	0	5+4	0	0	0	0+1	0
5	DF	(Azerbaijan) AZE	Rasim Ramaldanov	7	0	5	0	0	0	2	0
7	MF	(Azerbaijan) AZE	Roman Huseynov	16	1	10+3	1	0+2	0	0+1	0
8	MF	(Azerbaijan) AZE	Qismət Alıyev	23	1	18+1	1	2	0	2	0
9	MF	(Azerbaijan) AZE	Ehtiram Shahverdiyev	5	0	2+3	0	0	0	0	0
10	FW	(Mozambique) MOZ	Clésio	22	3	18	0	2	3	2	0
11	MF	(Azerbaijan) AZE	Asif Mammadov	16	0	12+1	0	0+1	0	1+1	0
12	MF	(France) FRA	Abdelrafik Gérard	4	0	2+2	0	0	0	0	0
14	FW	(Azerbaijan) AZE	Ulvi Isgandarov	21	4	6+12	3	0+1	1	1+1	0
17	MF	(Togo) TOG	Yaovi Akakpo	1	0	0+1	0	0	0	0	0
19	MF	(Azerbaijan) AZE	Rovlan Muradov	21	4	10+8	4	2	0	0+1	0
20	DF	(Azerbaijan) AZE	Faig Hajiyev	4	0	1+3	0	0	0	0	0
21	MF	(Spain) ESP	Fernań López	22	3	18	3	2	0	2	0
22	FW	(Chile) CHI	Rodrigo Gattas	2	0	0+2	0	0	0	0	0
28	DF	(Azerbaijan) AZE	Murad Musayev	9	0	6+2	0	0+1	0	0	0
32	FW	(Slovenia) SLO	Nicolas Rajsel	4	4	3+1	4	0	0	0	0
55	MF	(Azerbaijan) AZE	Idris Ingilabli	4	0	1+2	0	0+1	0	0	0
74	DF	(Azerbaijan) AZE	Yusif Nabiyev	17	0	12+2	0	2	0	1	0
77	MF	(Georgia (country)) GEO	Merab Gigauri	22	0	18	0	2	0	2	0
94	GK	(Azerbaijan) AZE	Tarlan Ahmadli	7	0	5+2	0	0	0	0	0
Players away from Gabala on loan:
Players who left Gabala during the season:
6	MF	(Senegal) SEN	Ibrahima Niasse	5	0	2+1	0	2	0	0	0
9	FW	(Georgia (country)) GEO	Davit Volkovi	18	7	14	5	2	2	2	0
13	FW	(Ivory Coast) CIV	Christian Kouakou	6	0	1+3	0	0	0	1+1	0

=== Goal scorers ===
Place	Position	Nation	Number	Name	Premier League	Azerbaijan Cup	Europa League	Total
1	FW	(Georgia (country))	9	Davit Volkovi	5	2	0	7
2	MF	(Azerbaijan)	19	Rovlan Muradov	4	0	0	4
2	FW	(Slovenia)	32	Nicolas Rajsel	4	0	0	4
2	FW	(Azerbaijan)	14	Ulvi Isgandarov	3	1	0	4
5	MF	(Spain)	21	Fernań López	3	0	0	3
5	FW	(Mozambique)	10	Clésio	0	3	0	3
7	DF	(Croatia)	3	Ivica Žunić	2	0	0	2
8	MF	(Azerbaijan)	7	Roman Huseynov	1	0	0	1
8	MF	(Azerbaijan)	8	Qismət Alıyev	1	0	0	1
8	DF	(Azerbaijan)	2	Amin Seydiyev	1	0	0	1
8				Own goal	1	0	0	1
				TOTALS	25	6	0	31

=== Clean sheets ===
Place	Position	Nation	Number	Name	Premier League	Azerbaijan Cup	Europa League	Total
1	GK	(Azerbaijan)	1	Anar Nazirov	4	1	0	5
				TOTALS	4	1	0	5

=== Disciplinary record ===
Number	Nation	Position	Name	Premier League		Azerbaijan Cup		Europa League		Total	
Number	Nation	Position	Name	Yellow card	Red card	Yellow card	Red card	Yellow card	Red card	Yellow card	Red card
1	(Azerbaijan)	GK	Anar Nazirov	4	1	0	0	0	0	4	1
2	(Azerbaijan)	DF	Amin Seydiyev	4	0	0	0	0	0	4	0
3	(Croatia)	DF	Ivica Žunić	3	0	0	0	0	0	3	0
4	(Azerbaijan)	DF	Sadig Guliyev	2	0	0	0	0	0	2	0
5	(Azerbaijan)	DF	Rasim Ramaldanov	0	0	0	0	2	0	2	0
7	(Azerbaijan)	MF	Roman Huseynov	3	0	0	0	0	0	3	0
8	(Azerbaijan)	MF	Qismət Alıyev	5	1	1	0	1	0	7	1
10	(Mozambique)	FW	Clésio	2	0	0	0	1	0	3	0
11	(Azerbaijan)	MF	Asif Mammadov	5	1	0	0	0	0	5	1
12	(France)	MF	Abdelrafik Gérard	1	0	0	0	0	0	1	0
14	(Azerbaijan)	FW	Ulvi Isgandarov	3	0	2	1	0	0	5	1
19	(Azerbaijan)	MF	Rovlan Muradov	3	0	1	0	0	0	4	0
20	(Azerbaijan)	DF	Faig Hajiyev	2	0	0	0	0	0	2	0
21	(Spain)	MF	Fernań López	9	1	0	0	1	0	10	1
28	(Azerbaijan)	DF	Murad Musayev	1	0	0	0	0	0	1	0
32	(Slovenia)	FW	Nicolas Rajsel	2	0	0	0	0	0	2	0
55	(Azerbaijan)	MF	Idris Ingilabli	1	0	0	0	0	0	1	0
74	(Azerbaijan)	DF	Yusif Nabiyev	0	0	1	0	0	0	1	0
77	(Georgia (country))	MF	Merab Gigauri	7	0	0	0	1	0	8	0
94	(Azerbaijan)	GK	Tarlan Ahmadli	1	0	0	0	0	0	1	0
Players who left Gabala during the season:
6	(Senegal)	MF	Ibrahima Niasse	1	0	0	0	0	0	1	0
9	(Georgia (country))	FW	Davit Volkovi	1	0	1	0	1	0	3	0
13	(Ivory Coast)	FW	Christian Kouakou	0	0	0	0	1	0	1	0
			TOTALS	60	4	6	1	8	0	74	5
