= James Adeniyi =

Nigerian footballer (born 1992)

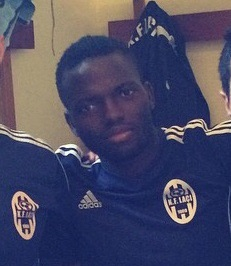
- James with Laçi in 2014

Personal information
- Full name: Segun James Adeniyi
- Date of birth: 20 December 1992 (age 33)
- Place of birth: Lagos, Nigeria
- Height: 1.77 m (5 ft 10 in)
- Position: Striker

Team information
- Current team: Bnei Sakhnin
- Number: 77

Senior career*
Years	Team	Apps	(Gls)
2012–2013	Bylis Ballsh	22	(1)
2012–2013	→ Tomori Berat (loan)	12	(2)
2014–2016	Laçi	55	(24)
2016–2018	Skënderbeu Korçë	81	(24)
2018–2021	Gabala	48	(14)
2019–2020	→ Ironi Kiryat Shmona	19	(3)
2021–2022	Maccabi Petah Tikva	32	(3)
2022–2024	Tuzlaspor	49	(11)
2024–2025	Hapoel Hadera	45	(11)
2025–2026	Hapoel Petah Tikva	18	(4)
2026–	Bnei Sakhnin	5	(0)
- * Club domestic league appearances and goals as of 24 June 2026

Segun James Adeniyi (born 20 December 1992) is a Nigerian professional footballer who plays as a striker for Bnei Sakhnin in the Israeli Premier League.

== Career ==
=== Early career ===
Adeniyi was born in Lagos, Nigeria into a Muslim family, and was raised in the Mushin neighbourhood of Lagos along with his two brothers and four sisters. In 2009, he was called up to a training camp hosted by the Nigeria under-17 national team, but he was later dropped and didn't make the final squad that went on to tour Qatar.

=== Bylis Ballsh ===
In January 2012, James joined Albanian Superliga side Bylis Ballsh, where other Nigerian players were already part of the squad, and he initially joined the club's youth team before being promoted to the first team ahead of the 2012–13 campaign. He made his professional debut on 23 September 2012 in an Albanian Superliga tie against FK Kukësi, coming on as an 80th-minute substitute for Shkëlzen Kelmendi in the 1–0 loss. Just a few days later on 26 September, James made his first professional start in an Albanian Cup tie against Tërbuni Pukë, where he also scored his first professional goal in the 2–0 win.

==== Loan to Tomori Berat ====
In January 2013, James was sent on loan to fellow top flight side Tomori Berat for the second part of 2012–13 season. After being initially used as a right-back, James impressed with his attack play and incursions forward and was given a more attacking role. He played his first game for his new side on 10 February, starting and playing full-90 minutes in a 1–0 away loss to Tirana. His first score-sheet contributions for the team came later in his fourth appearance, netting the opener inside four minutes in an eventual 1–2 home loss to Kastrioti Krujë. James played 12 matches during his short-spell term at the club, all of them as starter, collecting 1062 minutes as the team was relegated to Albanian First Division after two seasons. Following the end of the season, the team was scattered and James remained without money, after not being paid most of the time by the club, living along with the other foreigner players in the mini hotel near the stadium.

=== Laçi ===
==== 2014–15 season ====
On his European debut in the first qualifying round of the Europa League on 3 July 2014, James scored his first European goal against Slovenian side Rudar Velenje away from home. His goal came in the 89th minute of the game which equalised the score at 1–1. He also scored during the return leg, opening the score only to have a last gasp equaliser take the game to extra time and then penalties, where Laçi won 3–2 in the shootout and where Adeniyi scored the winning penalty.

After Laçi were eliminated from Europa League, James played his first league match on 24 August 2014, assisting Elton Doku in a 1–1 home draw against Partizani Tirana. On 20 September, in the matchday 5 against Tirana, James set-up his second assist of the season in a 2–0 home over the capital club. He scored his first goal of the season on 27 September in a 1–1 away draw against Flamurtari Vlorë, scoring the goal in 31st minute with a great chip from outside the zone.

In first leg of first round of 2014–15 Albanian Cup against Naftëtari Kuçovë, he scored the opener in 6th minute, helping the team to get a comfortable 2–0 away win.

==== 2015–16 season ====
On 12 August 2015, in the 2015 Albanian Supercup match held at Qemal Stafa Stadium, James scored twice for the team in an eventual 2–2 draw; he also scored his penalty shootout attempt helping Laçi to win the match 8–7 by penalty shootouts. That was the club's first Albanian Supercup in history.

=== Skënderbeu Korçë ===
On 1 February 2016, in the last day of the winter transfer window, James left Laçi to join Skënderbeu Korçë, where he signed a three-year contract. He debuted with the club six days later in the match against Kukësi, where James first assisted the first goal of Salihi and later scored for himself in an eventual 3–1 home win, placing Skënderbeu two points clear at the top.

On 4 May, in the matchday 33 of the league against Laçi, James was the main protagonist by providing three assists and netting twice for himself as Skënderbeu Korçë scored six goals in the first half in an eventual 6–1. In the final matchday of Albanian Superliga against Flamurtari Vlorë, James provided the assist of the team's second goal in an eventual 2–0 away success, helping the club to win its sixth consecutive league title and seventh overall. He finished the season by scoring 23 goals in all competitions with Laçi and Skënderbeu, including 15 in league, setting a new personal best.

==== 2016–17 season ====
James started the new season on 24 August by playing the last 10 minutes of the 2016 Albanian Supercup, where Skënderbeu was defeated 3–1 by Kukësi at the Selman Stërmasi Stadium. He started the league season by making another appearance as a substitute as the team won 2–1 against Flamurtari Vlorë at home. On 24 September, in the matchday 4, in his first match as a starter, James scored the lone goal against Luftëtari Gjirokastër as Skënderbeu grabbed the fourth consecutive win.

He made his 100th Albanian Superliga appearance on 25 April 2016 in the matchday 31 against Tirana. In 2016–17 season, James made 32 league appearances and scored 8 goals as Skënderbeu failed to win the title for the first time in six years. He also contributed with 6 matches and 3 goals in Albanian Cup as Skënderbeu lost the final to Tirana.

==== 2017–18 season ====
On 23 November 2017, in the 2017–18 UEFA Europa League Group B match against Dynamo Kyiv, James scored the second goal of his team in an eventual 3–1 home win, their second ever group stage victory. Although Skënderbeu was eliminated with one match in hand, he was named Man of the Match by UEFA.

On 27 May 2018, in the 2018 Albanian Cup Final, James won a penalty that was scored by Sabien Lilaj for the only goal of the match versus Laçi, meaning Skënderbeu has won the Albanian Cup for the first time. He also contributed with 10 goals and 32 appearances in championship which ended in conquest, meaning that the club has completed the domestic double for the first time in history.

=== Gabala ===
On 26 June 2018, James moved to Gabala FK of Azerbaijan Premier League by penning a three-year contract, rejoining his former teammate Sabien Lilaj. Skënderbeu reportedly earned €200,000 from the transfer and also retained 25% part ownership. He was presented on the same day, stating: "I'm happy to join up with Gabala. I'm a footballer with great targets and want to hit them in this club. I came to Gabala to reach to new successes. I know Gabala made some progresses in the UEFA Europa League last seasons. But this time I want to be a part of the more successes and go more ahead in the continental championship."

=== Ironi Kiryat Shmona ===
On 9 July 2019 signed to Ironi Kiryat Shmona.

== Personal life ==
James is a practicing Muslim. He is eligible to play for Nigeria, Togo and Albania, and has expressed his desire to play for Albania should the opportunity present itself.

== Career statistics ==
As of match played 1 June 2025

Appearances and goals by club, season and competition
Club	Season	League			National cup		League cup		Continental		Other		Total	
Club	Season	Division	Apps	Goals	Apps	Goals	Apps	Goals	Apps	Goals	Apps	Goals	Apps	Goals
Bylis Ballsh	2012–13	Albanian Superliga	6	0	2	1	—		—		—		8	1
Bylis Ballsh	2013–14	Albanian Superliga	16	1	1	1	—		—		—		17	2
Bylis Ballsh	Total		22	1	3	2	—		0	0	0	0	25	3
Tomori Berat (loan)	2012–13	Albanian Superliga	12	2	—		—		—		—		12	2
Laçi	2013–14	Albanian Superliga	11	4	1	0	—		—		—		12	4
Laçi	2014–15	Albanian Superliga	27	11	6	5	—		4 (Note: Appearance(s) in UEFA Europa League)	2	—		37	18
Laçi	2015–16	Albanian Superliga	17	9	3	5	—		2	0	1 (Note: Appearance in Albanian Supercup)	2	23	16
Laçi	Total		55	24	10	10	—		6	2	1	2	71	38
Skënderbeu Korçë	2015–16	Albanian Superliga	17	6	2	1	—		—		—		19	7
Skënderbeu Korçë	2016–17	Albanian Superliga	32	8	6	3	—		—		1	0	39	11
Skënderbeu Korçë	2017–18	Albanian Superliga	32	10	5	3	—		12	2	—		49	15
Skënderbeu Korçë	Total		81	24	13	7	—		12	2	1	0	107	33
Gabala	2018–19	Azerbaijan Premier League	25	10	4	2	—		2	0	–		31	12
Gabala	2019–20	Azerbaijan Premier League	0	0	0	0	—		0	0	–		0	0
Gabala	2020–21	Azerbaijan Premier League	23	4	3	2	—		–		–		26	6
Gabala	Total		48	14	7	4	—		2	0	—		57	18
Ironi Kiryat Shmona (loan)	2019–20	Israeli Premier League	19	3	1	1	5	2	—		—		25	6
Maccabi Petah Tikva	2021–22	Israeli Premier League	32	3	4	4	5	2	—		—		41	9
Tuzlaspor	2022–23	TFF First League	35	9	2	0	—		—		—		37	9
Tuzlaspor	2023–24	TFF First League	14	2	1	0	—		—		—		15	2
Tuzlaspor	Total		59	16	8	4	—		2	0	—		69	20
Hapoel Hadera	2023–24	Israeli Premier League	13	5	0	0	—		—		—		13	5
2024–25	32	Israeli Premier League	6	1	0	4	2	—		—		37	8	
Total		45	11	1	0	4	2	—		—		50	13	
Hapoel Petah Tikva	2025–26	Israeli Premier League	0	0	0	0	—		—		—		0	0
Total		0	0	0	0	—		2	0	—		0	0	
Career total			362	96	42	28	14	6	20	4	2	2	449	113

== Honours ==
Laçi

- Albanian Cup: 2014–15
- Albanian Supercup: 2015

Skënderbeu Korçë

- Albanian Superliga: 2015–16, 2017–18
- Albanian Cup: 2017–18

Gabala

- Azerbaijan Cup: 2018–19
