= Azerbaijan national football team results (2010–2019) =

This article details the fixtures and results of the Azerbaijani national football team in 2010s.

== Matches ==
As of match played 13 November 2025

Type	GP	W	D	L	GF	GA
Friendly Matches	41	13	13	15	39	49
UEFA European Championship qualifying	36	5	6	25	29	79
FIFA World Cup qualifiers	31	4	9	18	22	53
UEFA Nations League	24	6	8	10	19	31
Minor tournaments	5	3	1	1	10	6
Total	137	31	37	69	119	218

=== 2010 ===
25 February 2010 Friendly	Jordan	0–2	Azerbaijan	Amman, Jordan
19:00 AST (UTC+3)		Report	Ramim 1'; Ismayilov 31'	Stadium: King Abdullah Stadium; Attendance: 3,000; Referee: Hamdy Shaaban (Egypt)

3 March 2010 Friendly	Luxembourg	1–2	Azerbaijan	Luxembourg City, Luxembourg
20:00 CET (UTC+1)	Strasser 34'	Report	Guliev 24'; Məmmədov 37'	Stadium: Stade Josy Barthel; Attendance: 874; Referee: Petteri Kari (Finland)

26 May 2010 Friendly	Moldova	1–1	Azerbaijan	Seekirchen, Austria
18:30 CEST (UTC+2)	Cojocari 81'	Report	Məmmədov 21'	Stadium: Sportzentrum Aug; Attendance: 200; Referee: Gerald Lehner (Austria)

29 May 2010 Friendly	Azerbaijan	1–3	Macedonia	Bischofshofen, Austria
18:30 CEST (UTC+2)	Məmmədov 89'	Report	Tričkovski 9'; R.F. Sadygov 66' (o.g.); Ǵurovski 88'	Stadium: Sportplatz Bischofshofen; Attendance: 500; Referee: Dietmar Drabek (Austria)

2 June 2010 Friendly	Azerbaijan	0–0	Honduras	Zell am See, Austria
18:30 CEST (UTC+2)		Report		Stadium: Alois Latini Stadion; Attendance: 300; Referee: Oliver Drachta (Austria)

11 August 2010 Friendly	Azerbaijan	1–1	Kuwait	Baku, Azerbaijan
21:00 AZST (UTC+5)	Məmmədov 42'	Report	Al-Mutwa 82'	Stadium: Tofiq Bahramov Stadium; Attendance: 9,000; Referee: Sergei Karasev (Russia)

7 September 2010 UEFA Euro 2012 qualifying	Germany	6–1	Azerbaijan	Cologne, Germany
20:45 CEST (UTC+2)	Westermann 28'; Podolski 45+1'; Klose 45+2', 90+2'; R. F. Sadygov 53' (o.g.); Badstuber 86'	Report	Javadov 57'	Stadium: RheinEnergieStadion; Attendance: 43,751; Referee: Markus Strömbergsson (Sweden)

8 October 2010 UEFA Euro 2012 qualifying	Austria	3–0	Azerbaijan	Vienna, Austria
20:30 CEST (UTC+2)	Prödl 3'; Arnautović 53', 90+2'	Report		Stadium: Ernst Happel Stadion; Attendance: 26,500; Referee: Nicolai Vollquartz (Denmark)

12 October 2010 UEFA Euro 2012 qualifying	Azerbaijan	1–0	Turkey	Baku, Azerbaijan
20:00 AZST (UTC+5)	R.F. Sadygov 38'	Report		Stadium: Tofiq Bahramov Stadium; Attendance: 29,500; Referee: Alexandru Deaconu (Romania)

17 November 2010 Friendly	Montenegro	2–0	Azerbaijan	Podgorica, Montenegro
13:00 CET (UTC+1)	Pejović 62'; Bećiraj 73'	Report		Stadium: Podgorica City Stadium; Attendance: 2,000; Referee: Aleksandar Stavrev (Macedonia)

=== 2011 ===
9 February 2011 Friendly	Azerbaijan	0–2	Hungary	Dubai, United Arab Emirates
22:00 GST (UTC+4)		Report	Rudolf 37'; Hajnal 81'	Stadium: Stadium Al-Shabab; Attendance: 1,000; Referee: Mohamed Al-Zarouni (United Arab Emirates)

29 March 2011 UEFA Euro 2012 qualifying	Belgium	4–1	Azerbaijan	Brussels, Belgium
20:45 CEST (UTC+2)	Vertonghen 12'; Simons 32' (pen.); Chadli 45'; Vossen 74'	Report	Abishov 16'	Stadium: King Baudouin Stadium; Attendance: 34,985; Referee: Daniel Stalhammar (Sweden)

3 June 2011 UEFA Euro 2012 qualifying	Kazakhstan	2–1	Azerbaijan	Astana, Kazakhstan
19:00 KZT (UTC+6)	Gridin 57', 68'	Report	Nadirov 63'	Stadium: Astana Arena; Attendance: 10,000; Referee: Euan Norris (Scotland)

7 June 2011 UEFA Euro 2012 qualifying	Azerbaijan	1–3	Germany	Baku, Azerbaijan
22:00 AZST (UTC+5)	Hüseynov 89'	Report	Özil 29'; Gómez 40'; Schürrle 90+3'	Stadium: Tofik Bakhramov Stadium; Attendance: 29,858; Referee: Michael Koukoulakis (Greece)

10 August 2011 Friendly	Azerbaijan	0–1	Macedonia	Baku, Azerbaijan
20:00 AZST (UTC+5)		Report	Pandev 57'	Stadium: Dalga Arena; Attendance: 1,000; Referee: Aleksei Kulbakov (Belarus)

2 September 2011 UEFA Euro 2012 qualifying	Azerbaijan	1–1	Belgium	Baku, Azerbaijan
21:00 AZST (UTC+5)	R. Aliyev 86'	Report	Simons 55' (pen.)	Stadium: Tofik Bakhramov Stadium; Attendance: 9,300; Referee: Lee Probert (England)

6 September 2011 UEFA Euro 2012 qualifying	Azerbaijan	3–2	Kazakhstan	Baku, Azerbaijan
20:00 AZST (UTC+5)	R. Aliyev 53'; Shukurov 62' (pen.); Javadov 68'	Report	Ostapenko 20'; Yevstigneyev 77'	Stadium: Tofik Bakhramov Stadium; Attendance: 9,112; Referee: Anders Hermansen (Denmark)

7 October 2011 UEFA Euro 2012 qualifying	Azerbaijan	1–4	Austria	Baku, Azerbaijan
21:00 AZST (UTC+5)	Nadirov 74'	Report	Ivanschitz 34'; Janko 52', 62'; Junuzović 90+1'	Stadium: Dalga Stadium; Attendance: 6,000; Referee: Stephan Studer (Switzerland)

11 October 2011 UEFA Euro 2012 qualifying	Turkey	1–0	Azerbaijan	Istanbul, Turkey
20:00 EEST (UTC+3)	Yılmaz 60'	Report		Stadium: Türk Telekom Arena; Attendance: 32,174; Referee: Peter Rasmussen (Denmark)

11 November 2011 Friendly	Albania	0–1	Azerbaijan	Tirana, Albania
18:00 CET (UTC+1)		Report	R. Aliyev 22'	Stadium: Qemal Stafa Stadium; Attendance: 1,200; Referee: Paolo Mazzoleni (Italy)

=== 2012 ===
24 February 2012 Friendly	Azerbaijan	2–2	Singapore	Dubai, United Arab Emirates
16:30 GST (UTC+4)	R. Aliyev 15'; Shukurov 62'	(Report)	Ishak 72' (pen.); Mustafić 90+3'	Stadium: The Sevens Stadium; Attendance: 50; Referee: Fahad Al-Kassar (United Arab Emirates)

27 February 2012 Friendly	Azerbaijan	3–0	India	Dubai, United Arab Emirates
17:30 GST (UTC+4)	Nadirov 4'; Shukurov 42' (pen.); Hajiyev 84'	(Report)		Stadium: The Sevens Stadium; Attendance: 50; Referee: Hamad Al Shaikh Hashmi (United Arab Emirates)

23 May 2012 Friendly (2012 Kirin Cup)	Japan	2–0	Azerbaijan	Fukuroi, Japan
19:15 JST (UTC+9)	Kagawa 43'; Okazaki 58'	(Report)		Stadium: Shizuoka Stadium; Attendance: 30,276; Referee: Malik Abdul Bashir (Singapore)

30 May 2012 Friendly	Azerbaijan	0–0	Andorra	Frankfurt, Germany
17:00 CEST (UTC+2)		(Report)		Stadium: Sportpark Kelsterbach; Attendance: 50; Referee: Michael Weiner (Germany)

15 August 2012 Friendly	Azerbaijan	3–0	Bahrain	Baku, Azerbaijan
18:00 AZST (UTC+5)	Subašić 35'; Özkara 59'; Huseynov 77'	(Report)		Stadium: Ismat Gayibov Stadium; Referee: Giorgi Vadatchkoria (Georgia)

7 September 2012 2014 FIFA World Cup qualification	Azerbaijan	1–1	Israel	Baku, Azerbaijan
21:00 AZST (UTC+5)	Abishov 65'	(Report)	Natcho 50'	Stadium: Tofiq Bahramov Republican Stadium; Attendance: 22,211; Referee: Matej Jug (Slovenia)

11 September 2012 2014 FIFA World Cup qualification	Portugal	3–0	Azerbaijan	Braga, Portugal
20:15 WEST (UTC+1)	Varela 63'; Postiga 85'; Alves 88'	(Report)		Stadium: Estádio Municipal; Attendance: 29,971; Referee: Szymon Marciniak (Poland)

15 October 2012 2014 FIFA World Cup qualification	Russia	1–0	Azerbaijan	Moscow, Russia
19:00 MSD (UTC+4)	Shirokov 84' (pen.)	(Report)		Stadium: Luzhniki Stadium; Attendance: 15,033; Referee: Aleksandar Stavrev (Macedonia)

14 November 2012 2014 FIFA World Cup qualification	Northern Ireland	1–1	Azerbaijan	Belfast, Northern Ireland
19:45 GMT (UTC±0)	Healy 90+6'	(Report)	Aliyev 5'	Stadium: Windsor Park; Attendance: 12,372; Referee: Viktor Shvetsov (Ukraine)

=== 2013 ===
1 February 2013 Friendly	Uzbekistan	0–0	Azerbaijan	Dubai, United Arab Emirates
18:00 GST (UTC+4)		(Report)		Stadium: The Sevens Stadium; Attendance: 100; Referee: Ammar Al-Jeneibi (United Arab Emirates)

6 February 2013 Friendly	Azerbaijan	1–0	Liechtenstein	Dubai, United Arab Emirates
18:00 GST (UTC+4)	Javadov 75' (pen.)	(Report)	Erne (red card) 74'	Stadium: Za'abeel Stadium; Attendance: 67; Referee: Abdulla Al-Zaabi (United Arab Emirates)

22 March 2013 2014 FIFA World Cup qualification	Luxembourg	0–0	Azerbaijan	Luxembourg City, Luxembourg
20:15 CET (UTC+1)		Report		Stadium: Stade Josy Barthel; Attendance: 1,324; Referee: Padraigh Sutton (Ireland)

26 March 2013 2014 FIFA World Cup qualification	Azerbaijan	0–2	Portugal	Baku, Azerbaijan
21:00 AZT (UTC+4)	Aliyev (yellow card) 51' (yellow-red card) 56'	(Report)	Alves 63'; Almeida 79'	Stadium: Tofiq Bahramov Republican Stadium; Attendance: 24,558; Referee: Andre Marriner (England)

29 May 2013 Friendly	Qatar	1–1	Azerbaijan	Doha, Qatar
19:15 AST (UTC+3)	Ibrahim 33' (pen.)	(Report)	Dadashov 89'	Stadium: Jassim Bin Hamad Stadium; Attendance: 9,172; Referee: Wahid Tamuni Salah (Libya)

7 June 2013 2014 FIFA World Cup qualification	Azerbaijan	1–1	Luxembourg	Baku, Azerbaijan
21:00 AZST (UTC+5)	Abishov 71'; Subašić (red card) 84'	(Report)	Bensi 81'	Stadium: Eighth Kilometer District Stadium; Attendance: 9,258; Referee: Mihaly Fabian (Hungary)

14 August 2013 Friendly	Azerbaijan	3–0	Malta	Baku, Azerbaijan
21:00 AZST (UTC+5)	Dadashov 5', 71'; Aliyev 64'	(Report)	Agius (red card) 69'	Stadium: Eighth Kilometer District Stadium; Referee: Aleksandr Aliyev (Kazakhstan)

7 September 2013 2014 FIFA World Cup qualification	Israel	1–1	Azerbaijan	Ramat Gan, Israel
20:45 IDT (UTC+3)	Shechter 73'	(Report)	Amirguliyev 61'	Stadium: Ramat Gan Stadium; Attendance: 21,250; Referee: Stefan Johannesson (Sweden)

11 October 2013 2014 FIFA World Cup qualification	Azerbaijan	2–0	Northern Ireland	Baku, Azerbaijan
22:00 AZST (UTC+5)	Dadashov 58'; Shukurov 90+5'	(Report)	Evans (red card) 90+4'	Stadium: Eighth Kilometer District Stadium; Attendance: 10,100; Referee: Andrea De Marco (Italy)

15 October 2013 2014 FIFA World Cup qualification	Azerbaijan	1–1	Russia	Baku, Azerbaijan
22:00 AZST (UTC+5)	Medvedev (red card) 73'; Javadov 90'	(Report)	Shirokov 16'	Stadium: Eighth Kilometer District Stadium; Attendance: 11,000; Referee: Milorad Mažić (Serbia)

15 November 2013 Friendly	Estonia	2–1	Azerbaijan	Tallinn, Estonia
18:45 EET (UTC+2)	Zenjov 54'; Lindpere 66'	Report	Aliyev 44'	Stadium: A. Le Coq Arena; Attendance: 2,413; Referee: Aleksei Nikolaev (Russia)

19 November 2013 Friendly	Kyrgyzstan	0–0	Azerbaijan	Bishkek, Kyrgyzstan
15:00 KGT (UTC+6)		Report		Stadium: Spartak Stadium; Referee: Artyom Kuchin (Kazakhstan)

=== 2014 ===
5 March 2014 Friendly	Azerbaijan	1–0	Philippines	Dubai, United Arab Emirates
19:00 GST (UTC+4)	Yunuszade 26'	Report		Stadium: Maktoum Bin Rashid Al Maktoum Stadium; Attendance: 300; Referee: Fahad Al-Kassar (United Arab Emirates)

27 May 2014 Friendly	United States	2–0	Azerbaijan	San Francisco, United States
19:10 PDT (UTC-7)	Diskerud 75'; Jóhannsson 81'	Report		Stadium: Candlestick Park; Attendance: 24,688; Referee: Henry Bejarano (Costa Rica)

20 August 2014 Friendly	Azerbaijan	0–0	Uzbekistan	Baku, Azerbaijan
21:00 AZST (UTC+5)		Report		Stadium: Tofiq Bahramov Stadium; Attendance: 4,500; Referee: Giorgi Vadachkoria (Georgia)

3 September 2014 Friendly	Russia	4–0	Azerbaijan	Khimki, Russia
20:00 MDT (UTC+5)	Kerzhakov 6', 12'; Ignashevich 41'; Granat 81'	Report		Stadium: Arena Khimki; Attendance: 3,500; Referee: Ravshan Irmatov (Uzbekistan)

9 September 2014 UEFA Euro 2016 qualifying	Azerbaijan	1–2	Bulgaria	Baku, Azerbaijan
21:00 AZST (UTC+5)	Nazarov 54'	Report	Mitsanski 14'; V. Hristov 87'	Stadium: Bakcell Arena; Attendance: 11,000; Referee: Alon Yefet (Israel)

10 October 2014 UEFA Euro 2016 qualifying	Italy	2–1	Azerbaijan	Palermo, Italy
20:45 CEST (UTC+2)	Chiellini 44', 82'	Report	Chiellini 76' (o.g.)	Stadium: Stadio Renzo Barbera; Attendance: 33,000; Referee: Hüseyin Göçek (Turkey)

13 October 2014 UEFA Euro 2016 qualifying	Croatia	6–0	Azerbaijan	Osijek, Croatia
20:45 CEST (UTC+2)	Kramarić 11'; Perišić 34', 45'; Brozović 45+1'; Modrić 57' (pen.); Sadygov 61' (o.g.)	Report		Stadium: Gradski vrt Attendance: 16,021; Referee: Stephan Studer (Switzerland)

16 November 2014 UEFA Euro 2016 qualifying	Azerbaijan	0–1	Norway	Baku, Azerbaijan
21:00 AZT (UTC+4)		Report	Nordtveit 25'	Stadium: Bakcell Arena; Attendance: 9,200; Referee: Yevhen Aranovskiy (Ukraine)

=== 2015 ===
28 March 2015 UEFA Euro 2016 qualifying	Azerbaijan	2–0	Malta	Baku, Azerbaijan
21:00 AZT (UTC+4)	Huseynov 4'; Nazarov 90+2'	Report		Stadium: Tofiq Bahramov Stadium; Attendance: 14,600; Referee: Halis Özkahya (Turkey)

6 June 2015 Friendly	Serbia	4–1	Azerbaijan	Sankt Pölten, Austria
17:00 CEST (UTC+2)	Ivanović 10', 63'; Ljajić 55'; Marković 89'	Report	Nazarov 39'	Stadium: NV Arena; Attendance: 4,000; Referee: Harald Lechner (Austria)

12 June 2015 UEFA Euro 2016 qualifying	Norway	0–0	Azerbaijan	Oslo, Norway
20:45 CEST (UTC+2)		Report		Stadium: Ullevaal Stadion; Attendance: 21,228; Referee: Paweł Gil (Poland)

3 September 2015 UEFA Euro 2016 qualifying	Azerbaijan	0–0	Croatia	Baku, Azerbaijan
21:00 AZST (UTC+5)		Report		Stadium: Tofiq Bahramov Stadium; Attendance: 10,000; Referee: Ruddy Buquet (France)

6 September 2015 UEFA Euro 2016 qualifying	Malta	2–2	Azerbaijan	Ta' Qali, Malta
18:00 CEST (UTC+2)	Mifsud 55'; Effiong 71'	Report	Amirguliyev 36', 80'	Stadium: Ta' Qali National Stadium; Attendance: 5,266; Referee: Harald Lechner (Austria)

10 October 2015 UEFA Euro 2016 qualifying	Azerbaijan	1–3	Italy	Baku, Azerbaijan
21:00 AZST (UTC+5)	Nazarov 31'	Report	Éder 11'; El Shaarawy 43'; Darmian 65'	Stadium: Baku Olympic Stadium; Attendance: 48,000; Referee: Willie Collum (Scotland)

13 October 2015 UEFA Euro 2016 qualifying	Bulgaria	2–0	Azerbaijan	Sofia, Bulgaria
20:45 EEST (UTC+3)	M. Aleksandrov 20'; Rangelov 56'	Report		Stadium: Vasil Levski; Attendance: 2,500; Referee: Tamás Bognár (Hungary)

17 November 2015 Friendly	Azerbaijan	2–1	Moldova	Baku, Azerbaijan
21:00 AZT (UTC+4)	Carp 33' (o.g.); Ramazanov 50'	Report	Antoniuc 44'	Stadium: Baku Olympic Stadium; Attendance: 10,000; Referee: Lasha Silagava (Georgia)

=== 2016 ===
26 March 2016 Friendly	Azerbaijan	0–1	Kazakhstan	Antalya, Turkey
17:00 EET (UTC+2)		Report	Baizhanov 8'	Stadium: Gloria Sports Arena; Attendance: 78; Referee: Ali Palabıyık (Turkey)

26 May 2016 Friendly	Azerbaijan	0–0	Andorra	Bad Erlach, Austria
18:00 CEST (UTC+2)		Report		Stadium: Sportplatz Bad Erlach; Attendance: 300; Referee: Harald Lechner (Austria)

29 May 2016 Friendly	Macedonia	3–1	Azerbaijan	Bad Erlach, Austria
17:00 CEST (UTC+2)	Radeski 20'; Pandev 33'; Nestorovski 90+2'	Report	Ismayilov 73'	Stadium: Sportplatz Bad Erlach; Attendance: 300; Referee: Markus Hameter (Austria)

3 June 2016 Friendly	Canada	1–1	Azerbaijan	Bad Erlach, Austria
19:00 CEST (UTC+2)	Akindele 43'	Report	Nazarov 58' (pen.)	Stadium: Sportplatz Bad Erlach; Attendance: 150; Referee: Sascha Amhof (Switzerland)

4 September 2016 2018 FIFA World Cup qualification	San Marino	0–1	Azerbaijan	Serravalle, San Marino
18:00 CEST (UTC+2)		Report (FIFA); Report (UEFA)	Qurbanov 45'	Stadium: San Marino Stadium; Attendance: 886; Referee: Sébastien Delferière (Belgium)

8 September 2016 2018 FIFA World Cup qualification	Azerbaijan	1–0	Norway	Baku, Azerbaijan
20:00 AZT (UTC+4)	Medvedev 11'	Report (FIFA); Report (UEFA)		Stadium: Baku Olympic Stadium; Attendance: 35,000; Referee: Liran Liany (Israel)

11 October 2016 2018 FIFA World Cup qualification	Czech Republic	0–0	Azerbaijan	Ostrava, Czech Republic
19:45 CEST (UTC+2)	Medvedev 11'	Report (FIFA); Report (UEFA)		Stadium: Municipal Stadium; Attendance: 12,148; Referee: Matej Jug (Slovenia)

11 November 2016 2018 FIFA World Cup qualification	Northern Ireland	4–0	Azerbaijan	Belfast, Northern Ireland
19:45 GMT (UTC±0)	K. Lafferty 27'; McAuley 40'; C. McLaughlin 66'; Brunt 83'	Report (FIFA); Report (UEFA)		Stadium: Windsor Park; Attendance: 18,404; Referee: Clément Turpin (France)

=== 2017 ===
9 March 2017 Friendly	Qatar	1–2	Azerbaijan	Doha, Qatar
19:00 AST (UTC+3)	Assadalla 55'	Report	Guliyev 52'; Abdullayev 62'	Stadium: Jassim Bin Hamad Stadium; Referee: Ferenc Karakó (Hungary)

26 March 2017 2018 FIFA World Cup qualification	Azerbaijan	1–4	Germany	Baku, Azerbaijan
20:00 AZT (UTC+4)	Nazarov 31'	Report (FIFA); Report (UEFA)	Schürrle 19', 81'; Müller 36'; Gómez 45'	Stadium: Tofiq Bahramov Republican Stadium; Attendance: 30,000; Referee: Daniele Orsato (Italy)

10 June 2017 2018 FIFA World Cup qualification	Azerbaijan	0–1	Northern Ireland	Baku, Azerbaijan
20:00 AZT (UTC+4)		Report (FIFA); Report (UEFA)	Dallas 90+2'	Stadium: Tofiq Bahramov Republican Stadium; Attendance: 27,978; Referee: Xavier Estrada Fernández (Spain)

1 September 2017 2018 FIFA World Cup qualification	Norway	2–0	Azerbaijan	Oslo, Norway
20:45 CEST (UTC+2)	King 31' (pen.); Sadygov 60' (o.g.)	Report (FIFA); Report (UEFA)		Stadium: Ullevaal Stadion; Attendance: 8,599; Referee: Daniel Stefański (Poland)

4 September 2017 2018 FIFA World Cup qualification	Azerbaijan	5–1	San Marino	Baku, Azerbaijan
20:00 AZT (UTC+4)	Ismayilov 20', 57'; Abdullayev 24'; Cevoli 71' (o.g.); Sadygov 81'	Report (FIFA); Report (UEFA)	Palazzi 74'	Stadium: Bakcell Arena; Attendance: 8,000; Referee: Nikola Dabanović (Montenegro)

5 October 2017 2018 FIFA World Cup qualification	Azerbaijan	1–2	Czech Republic	Baku, Azerbaijan
20:00 AZT (UTC+4)	Ismayilov 55' (pen.)	Report (FIFA); Report (UEFA)	Kopic 35'; Barák 66'	Stadium: Olympic Stadium; Attendance: 16,200; Referee: Benoît Millot (France)

8 October 2017 2018 FIFA World Cup qualification	Germany	5–1	Azerbaijan	Kaiserslautern, Germany
20:45 CEST (UTC+2)	Goretzka 8', 66'; Wagner 54'; Rüdiger 64'; Can 81'	Report (FIFA); Report (UEFA)	Sheydayev 34'	Stadium: Fritz-Walter-Stadion; Attendance: 34,613; Referee: Andris Treimanis (Latvia)

=== 2018 ===
30 January 2018 Friendly	Azerbaijan	0–0	Moldova	Antalya, Turkey
19:00 TRT (UTC+3)		Report		Stadium: Mardan Sports Complex; Attendance: 300; Referee: Hüseyin Göçek (Turkey)

23 March 2018 Friendly	Azerbaijan	0–1	Belarus	Baku, Azerbaijan
20:00 AZT (UTC+4)		Report	Medvedev 42' (o.g.)	Stadium: Olympic Stadium; Attendance: 6,700; Referee: Andris Treimanis (Latvia)

27 March 2018 Friendly	Azerbaijan	1–1	Macedonia	Antalya, Turkey
19:00 TRT (UTC+3)	Almeida 6' (pen.)	Report	Trajkovski 22' (pen.)	Stadium: Mardan Sports Complex; Attendance: 200; Referee: Halis Özkahya (Turkey)

29 May 2018 Friendly	Azerbaijan	3–0	Kyrgyzstan	Baku, Azerbaijan
20:00 AZT (UTC+4)	Medvedev 17'; Madatov 75'; Abbasov 83'	Report		Stadium: Olympic Stadium; Referee: Ali Palabıyık (Turkey)

5 June 2018 Friendly	Kazakhstan	3–0	Azerbaijan	Astana, Kazakhstan
20:00 KZT (UTC+6)	Murtazayev 13'; Muzhikov 14'; Zaynutdinov 90'	Report		Stadium: Astana Arena; Attendance: 22,500; Referee: Alexandru Tean (Moldova)

9 June 2018 Friendly	Latvia	1–3	Azerbaijan	Rīga, Latvia
19:00 AZT (UTC+4)	Uldriķis 90+4'	Report	Medvedev 20'; Imamverdiyev 57'; Mahmudov 63'	Stadium: Daugava Stadium; Attendance: 3,590; Referee: Denis Scherbakov (Belarus)

7 September 2018 2018–19 Nations League	Azerbaijan	0–0	Kosovo	Baku, Azerbaijan
20:00 AZT (UTC+4)		Report		Stadium: Baku Olympic Stadium; Attendance: 19,500; Referee: Ola Hobber Nilsen (Norway)

10 September 2018 2018–19 Nations League	Malta	1–1	Azerbaijan	Ta' Qali, Malta
20:45 CEST (UTC+2)	Agius 10' (pen.)	Report	Khalilzade 26'	Stadium: National Stadium; Attendance: 4,500; Referee: Nikola Dabanović (Montenegro)

11 October 2018 2018–19 Nations League	Faroe Islands	0–3	Azerbaijan	Tórshavn, Faroe Islands
19:45 WEST (UTC+1)		Report	Almeida 28', 86' (pen.); Nazarov 67'	Stadium: Tórsvøllur; Attendance: 2,820; Referee: Aleksei Eskov (Russia)

14 October 2018 2018–19 Nations League	Azerbaijan	1–1	Malta	Baku, Azerbaijan
20:00 AZT (UTC+4)	Abdullayev 53'	Report	Muscat 37'	Stadium: Olympic Stadium; Attendance: 16,200; Referee: Ivan Bebek (Croatia)

17 November 2018 2018–19 Nations League	Azerbaijan	2–0	Faroe Islands	Baku, Azerbaijan
21:00 AZT (UTC+4)	Nazarov 18'; Madatov 28'	Report		Stadium: Olympic Stadium; Attendance: 12,653; Referee: Demetrios Masias (Cyprus)

20 November 2018 2018–19 Nations League	Kosovo	4–0	Azerbaijan	Pristina, Kosovo
20:45 CET (UTC+1)	Zeneli 2', 50', 76'; Rrahmani 61'	Report		Stadium: Fadil Vokrri Stadium; Attendance: 12,532; Referee: Benoît Millot (France)

=== 2019 ===
21 March 2019 UEFA Euro 2020 qualifying	Croatia	2–1	Azerbaijan	Zagreb, Croatia
20:45 CET (UTC+1)	Barišić 44'; Kramarić 79'	Report	Sheydayev 19'	Stadium: Stadion Maksimir; Attendance: 23,146; Referee: Georgi Kabakov (Bulgaria)

25 March 2019 Friendly	Azerbaijan	0–0	Lithuania	Baku, Azerbaijan
20:00 AZT (UTC+4)		Report		Stadium: Bakcell Arena; Attendance: 3,122; Referee: Horațiu Fesnic (Romania)

8 June 2019 UEFA Euro 2020 qualifying	Azerbaijan	1–3	Hungary	Baku, Azerbaijan
20:00 AZT (UTC+4)	Emreli 69'	Report	Orban 18', 53'; Holman 71'	Stadium: Bakcell Arena; Attendance: 10,450; Referee: Kevin Blom (Netherlands)

11 June 2019 UEFA Euro 2020 qualifying	Azerbaijan	1–5	Slovakia	Baku, Azerbaijan
20:00 AZT (UTC+4)	Sheydayev 29'	Report	Lobotka 8'; Kucka 27'; Hamšík 30', 57'; Hancko 85'	Stadium: Bakcell Arena; Attendance: 8,200; Referee: John Beaton (Scotland)

6 September 2019 UEFA Euro 2020 qualifying	Wales	2–1	Azerbaijan	Cardiff, Wales
19:45 BST (UTC+1)	Pashayev 26' (o.g.); Bale 84'	Report	Emreli 59'	Stadium: Cardiff City Stadium; Attendance: 28,385; Referee: Trustin Farrugia Cann (Malta)

9 September 2019 UEFA Euro 2020 qualifying	Azerbaijan	1–1	Croatia	Baku, Azerbaijan
20:00 AZT (UTC+4)	Khalilzade 72'	Report	Modrić 11' (pen.)	Stadium: Bakcell Arena; Attendance: 9,150; Referee: Sandro Schärer (Switzerland)

9 October 2019 Friendly	Bahrain	2–3	Azerbaijan	Riffa, Bahrain
19:30 AST (UTC+3)	Al-Malood 31'; Al-Shaikh 68'	Report	Dadashov 40'; Khalilzade 62'; Sheydayev 70'	Stadium: Bahrain National Stadium; Attendance: 500; Referee: Ahmed Al-Kaf (Oman)

13 October 2019 UEFA Euro 2020 qualifying	Hungary	1–0	Azerbaijan	Budapest, Hungary
18:00 CEST (UTC+2)	Korhut 10'	Report		Stadium: Groupama Arena; Attendance: 11,300; Referee: Dennis Higler (Netherlands)

16 November 2019 UEFA Euro 2020 qualifying	Azerbaijan	0–2	Wales	Baku, Azerbaijan
21:00 AZT (UTC+4)		Report	Moore 10'; Wilson 34'	Stadium: Bakcell Arena; Attendance: 8,622; Referee: Deniz Aytekin (Germany)

19 November 2019 UEFA Euro 2020 qualifying	Slovakia	2–0	Azerbaijan	Trnava, Slovakia
20:45 CET (UTC+1)	Boženík 19'; Hamšík 86'	Report		Stadium: Anton Malatinský Stadium; Attendance: 7,825; Referee: Serhiy Boyko (Ukraine)
