= Abdelrafik Gérard =

French footballer (born 1993)

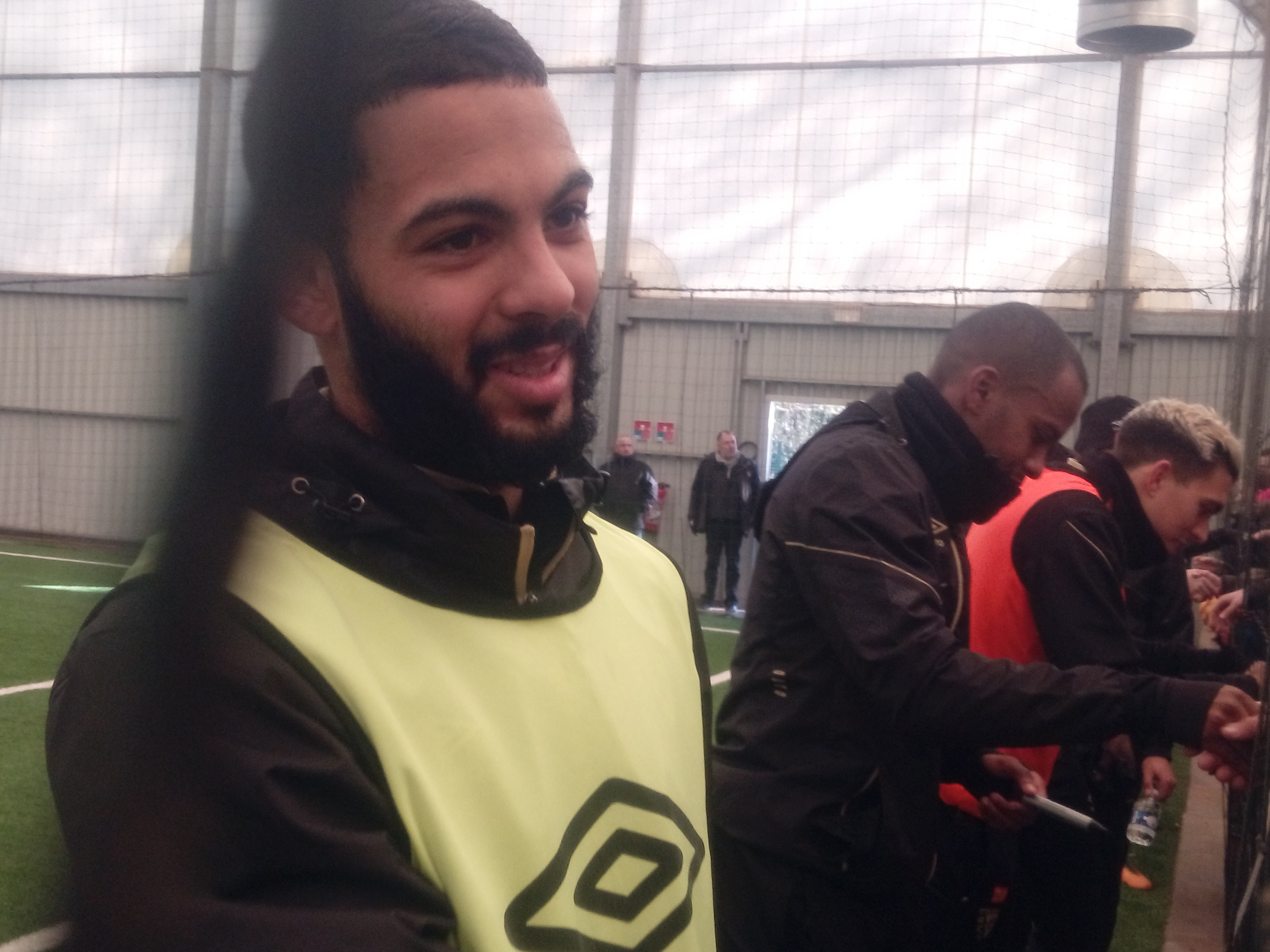

Personal information
- Full name: Abdelrafik Gérard
- Date of birth: 8 June 1993 (age 33)
- Place of birth: Ivry-sur-Seine, France
- Height: 1.76 m (5 ft 9 in)
- Position: Midfielder

Senior career*
Years	Team	Apps	(Gls)
2012–2015	Paris Saint-Germain B	30	(0)
2015–2016	US Créteil	14	(1)
2016–2018	Lens	37	(3)
2018–2019	Union SG	26	(0)
2020	Gabala	4	(0)
- * Club domestic league appearances and goals as of 09:16, 2 October 2020 (UTC)

Abdelrafik Gérard (born 8 June 1993) is a French footballer who last played for Gabala FK as a midfielder.

== Career ==
=== Club ===
On 30 January 2020, Gabala FK announced the signing of Gérard on an 18-month contract.

== Personal life ==
Gérard was born in France to a Reunnionais father, and an Algerian mother. He holds both French and Algerian nationalities.

== Career statistics ==
=== Club ===
As of match played 22 February 2020

Club statistics
Club	Season	League			Cup		Continental		Other		Total	
Club	Season	Division	Apps	Goals	Apps	Goals	Apps	Goals	Apps	Goals	Apps	Goals
Union Saint-Gilloise	2018–19	Proximus League	9	0	2	1	–		8	1	19	2
Union Saint-Gilloise	2019–20	Proximus League	8	0	1	0	–		–		9	0
Union Saint-Gilloise	Total		17	0	3	1	-	-	8	1	28	2
Gabala	2019–20	Premier League	4	0	0	0	0	0	–		4	0
Career total			21	0	3	1	0	0	8	1	32	2
