= 2018–19 Gabala FC season =

Gabala
2018-19 season
- Chairman: Tale Heydarov
- Manager: Sanan Gurbanov
- Stadium: Gabala City Stadium
- Premier League: 4th
- Azerbaijan Cup: Champions
- Europa League: First Qualifying Round vs Progrès Niederkorn
- Top goalscorer: League: James Adeniyi (10); All: James Adeniyi (12)
Home colours	Away colours

The 2018–19 season marked Gabala's 14th season in the Azerbaijan Premier League, the top-flight of Azerbaijani football. The club participated in the Premier League, finishing fourth and secured their first title by winning the Azerbaijan Cup, defeating Sumgayit 1-0. They also played in the Europa League but were eliminated by Progrès Niederkorn in the first qualifying round.

== Season events ==
At the end of the previous season, Roman Hryhorchuk left the club after his contract expired, with Sanan Gurbanov being appointed as the club's new manager on a two-year contract. On 16 June, Sabien Lilaj signed a one-year contract, with the option of a second year, from Skënderbeu Korçë. Ten days later, on 26 June, Gabala signed their second player from Skënderbeu Korçë, Nigerian forward James Adeniyi on a three-year contract. On 3 July, Lalawélé Atakora signed a one-year contract with Gabala, also having the option for an additional year.

On 6 January 2019, Anar Nazirov returned to Gabala for his third spell with the club, signing an 18-month contract from Zira, whilst Agil Mammadov moved to Neftchi Baku the following day.

On 9 January 2019, young midfielder Hajiagha Hajili made his season-long loan deal with Qarabağ a permanent transfer. On 11 January, Davit Volkovi signed from Saburtalo Tbilisi on a one-year contract.

== Transfers ==
=== In ===
Date	Position	Nationality	Name	From	Fee	Ref.
16 June 2018	MF	(Albania)	Sabien Lilaj	Skënderbeu Korçë	Undisclosed	
26 June 2018	FW	(Nigeria)	James Adeniyi	Skënderbeu Korçë	Undisclosed	
3 July 2018	MF	(Togo)	Lalawélé Atakora	Adana Demirspor	Undisclosed	
6 January 2019	GK	(Azerbaijan)	Anar Nazirov	Zira	Undisclosed	
11 January 2019	FW	(Georgia (country))	Davit Volkovi	Saburtalo Tbilisi	Undisclosed	

=== Out ===
Date	Position	Nationality	Name	To	Fee	Ref.
7 July 2018	MF	(Azerbaijan)	Araz Abdullayev	Panionios	Undisclosed	
29 July 2018	FW	(Ukraine)	Ramil Hasanov	1074 Çankırıspor	Undisclosed	
	MF	(Azerbaijan)	Ülvi İbazadə	Sabah	Undisclosed	
	FW	(Azerbaijan)	Kamran Guliyev	Jonava	Undisclosed	
29 December 2018	MF	(Azerbaijan)	Tamkin Khalilzade	Sabah	Undisclosed	
7 January 2019	GK	(Azerbaijan)	Agil Mammadov	Neftchi Baku	Undisclosed	
9 January 2019	MF	(Azerbaijan)	Hajiagha Hajili	Qarabağ	9 January 2019	

=== Loans out ===
Date from	Position	Nationality	Name	To	Date to	Ref.
12 June 2018	DF	(Azerbaijan)	Yusif Nabiyev	Sumgayit	End of Season	
Summer 2018	MF	(Azerbaijan)	Hajiagha Hajili	Qarabağ	9 January 2019	
Summer 2018	FW	(Azerbaijan)	Rovlan Muradov	Qarabağ	Winter 2019	
Summer 2018	FW	(Azerbaijan)	Ulvi Isgandarov	Sumgayit	End of Season	

=== Trial ===
Date From	Date To	Position	Nationality	Name	Last club	Ref.
January 2019			(Brazil)	Mateus		
January 2019		MF	(Brazil)	Jô		
January 2019			(Brazil)	Vellerson da Silva		
January 2019			(Brazil)	Kayo Neves		

=== Released ===
Date	Position	Nationality	Name	Joined	Date
31 May 2018	DF	(Suriname)	Dion Malone	ADO Den Haag	27 July 2018
31 May 2019	GK	(Ukraine)	Dmytro Bezotosnyi	Chornomorets Odesa	10 July 2019
31 May 2019	DF	(Serbia)	Vojislav Stanković	Neftçi Baku	4 June 2019
31 May 2019	FW	(Azerbaijan)	Rauf Aliyev	Neftçi Baku	10 June 2019

== Squad ==
As of match played 19 May 2019

No.	Name	Nationality	Position	Date of birth (age)	Signed from	Signed in	Contract ends	Apps.	Goals
Goalkeepers
1	Anar Nazirov	(Azerbaijan)	GK	8 September 1985 (aged 33)	Zira	2019	2020	35	0
22	Dmytro Bezotosnyi	(Ukraine)	GK	15 November 1983 (aged 35)	Chornomorets Odesa	2015		166	0
35	Murad Popov	(Azerbaijan)	GK	5 March 1999 (aged 20)	Trainee	2016		1	0
Defenders
3	Vojislav Stanković	(Serbia)	DF	22 September 1987 (aged 31)	Inter Baku	2017	2019	142	3
5	Rasim Ramaldanov	(Azerbaijan)	DF	24 January 1986 (aged 33)	Kolkheti-1913 Poti	2017		32	1
6	Rustam Nuruyev	(Azerbaijan)	DF	6 March 2000 (aged 19)	Trainee	2019		0	0
27	Bahlul Mustafazade	(Azerbaijan)	DF	27 February 1997 (aged 22)	Trainee	2016		29	1
33	Vusal Masimov	(Azerbaijan)	DF	3 April 2000 (aged 19)	Trainee	2019		0	0
34	Urfan Abbasov	(Azerbaijan)	DF	14 October 1992 (aged 26)	Qarabağ	2011		220	3
Midfielders
2	Amin Seydiyev	(Azerbaijan)	MF	15 November 1998 (aged 20)	Trainee	2017		16	0
4	Elvin Jamalov	(Azerbaijan)	MF	4 February 1995 (aged 24)	Trainee	2013		141	0
7	Roman Huseynov	(Azerbaijan)	MF	26 December 1997 (aged 21)	Trainee	2015		23	1
8	Qismət Alıyev	(Azerbaijan)	MF	24 October 1996 (aged 22)	Trainee	2014		58	0
11	Asif Mammadov	(Azerbaijan)	MF	5 August 1986 (aged 32)	Inter Baku	2015		127+	12
14	Javid Huseynov	(Azerbaijan)	MF	9 March 1988 (aged 31)	Baku	2016		119	21
18	Ilgar Gurbanov	(Azerbaijan)	MF	25 April 1986 (aged 33)	Qarabağ	2017	2019	41	1
21	Lalawélé Atakora	(Togo)	MF	9 November 1990 (aged 28)	Adana Demirspor	2018	2019	29	1
77	Samir Gurbanov	(Azerbaijan)	MF	21 March 2001 (aged 18)	Trainee	2018		1	0
88	Sabien Lilaj	(Albania)	MF	10 February 1989 (aged 30)	Skënderbeu Korçë	2018	2019	29	0
98	Rovlan Muradov	(Azerbaijan)	MF	28 March 1998 (aged 21)	Trainee	2017		2	0
Forwards
9	Davit Volkovi	(Georgia (country))	ST	3 June 1995 (aged 23)	Saburtalo Tbilisi	2019	2019	16	3
10	Rauf Aliyev	(Azerbaijan)	ST	12 February 1989 (aged 30)	Kukësi	2018	2019	30	4
17	James Adeniyi	(Nigeria)	ST	20 December 1992 (aged 26)	Skënderbeu Korçë	2018	2021	31	12
28	Steeven Joseph-Monrose	(France)	ST	20 July 1990 (aged 28)	Stade Brest	2017	2019	62	20
Out on loan
74	Yusif Nabiyev	(Azerbaijan)	DF	3 September 1997 (aged 21)	Trainee	2015		4	0
77	Ulvi Isgandarov	(Azerbaijan)	ST	17 April 1998 (aged 21)	Trainee	2017		1	1
Left during the season
29	Hajiagha Hajili	(Azerbaijan)	MF	30 January 1998 (aged 21)	Trainee	2016		4	0
30	Agil Mammadov	(Azerbaijan)	GK	1 May 1989 (aged 30)	Neftchi Baku	2018		9	0
33	Tamkin Khalilzade	(Azerbaijan)	MF	6 August 1993 (aged 25)	Zira	2017	2020	30	1

=== Out on loan ===
Note: Flags indicate national team as defined under FIFA eligibility rules; some limited exceptions apply. Players may hold more than one non-FIFA nationality.

No. / Pos. / Nation / Player; — / DF / AZE / Yusif Nabiyev (at Sumgayit)	No. / Pos. / Nation / Player; — / FW / AZE / Ulvi Isgandarov (at Sumgayit)

== Friendlies ==
23 June 2018	Kukësi (Albania)	1 – 1	(Azerbaijan) Gabala	Slovenia
20:00 AZT (UTC+4)	Špehar	Report	Joseph-Monrose 79'

28 June 2018	Dinamo Zagreb (Croatia)	2 – 0	(Azerbaijan) Gabala	Slovenia
AZST (UTC+4)	Šunjić 64'; Marin 86'	Report

4 July 2018	KS Cracovia (Poland)	1 – 0	(Azerbaijan) Gabala	Slovenia
AZST (UTC+4)	Goal	Report

31 July 2018	Gabala	2 – 1	Gabala Reserves	Baku
AZST (UTC+4)	R.Aliyev 11'; Adeniyi 75'	Report	R.Shahmuradov 67'	Stadium: Baku Training Ground

4 August 2018	Gabala	2 – 0	Keşla	Baku
AZST (UTC+4)	Denis 46' (o.g.); R.Aliyev 85'	Report		Stadium: Baku Olympic Stadium Reserve Pitch

8 September 2018	Gabala	0 – 2	Zira	Baku
AZST (UTC+4)		Report	Scarlatache 31'; Isgandarli 40'	Stadium: Azerbaijan State Academy of Physical Culture and Sports

13 October 2018	Gabala	1 – 0	Sabail	Baku
16:00 AZST (UTC+4)	Adeniyi 65'	Report		Stadium: FC Baku Training Ground

12 January 2019	Gabala	2 – 0	Qaradağ Lökbatan	Baku
AZST (UTC+4)	R.Aliyev 20'; Lilaj 62'	Report		Stadium: Bilajari Football Center

16 January 2019	Gabala (Azerbaijan)	1 – 2	(Germany) Meppen	Turkey
AZST (UTC+4)	Vellerson da Silva	Report	Goal

20 January 2019	Gabala (Azerbaijan)	2 – 2	(Russia) Yenisey Krasnoyarsk	Turkey
AZST (UTC+4)	R.Aliyev 53'; Lilaj 71'	Report	Gritsayenko 56'; Kutyin 86'

24 January 2019	Gabala (Azerbaijan)	v	(Russia) Fakel Voronezh	Turkey
18:00 AZST (UTC+4)
Note: Match cancelled due to adverse weather conditions.

26 January 2019	Gabala (Azerbaijan)	3 – 0	(Hungary) MTK Budapest	Turkey
AZST (UTC+4)	Huseynov 40'; Atakora 74'; Lilaj 79'	Report

25 March 2019	Sumgayit	1 – 2	Gabala	Baku
AZST (UTC+4)	E.Mammadov 12'	Report	A.Mammadov 35'; R.Aliyev 50'	Stadium: Baku Olympic Stadium Reserve Field

== Competitions ==
=== Azerbaijan Premier League ===
==== Results summary ====
Overall								Home						Away					
Pld	W	D	L	GF	GA	GD	Pts	W	D	L	GF	GA	GD	W	D	L	GF	GA	GD
28	9	9	10	31	33	−2	36	6	5	3	18	14	+4	3	4	7	13	19	−6

Last updated: 11 May 2019.
Source: See Results

==== Results ====
12 August 2018 1	Gabala	3 – 0	Sabail	Qabala
19:00 AZST (UTC+4)	As.Mammadov 23'; Abbasov (yellow card) 27' (goal) 63'; Adeniyi 82'	Report		Stadium: Gabala City Stadium; Attendance: 600; Referee: Aliyar Aghayev

19 August 2018 2	Neftchi Baku	2 – 1	Gabala	Baku
18:30 AZST (UTC+4)	Dabo 36'; Dário 48'	Report	Jamalov (yellow card) 40'; R.Aliyev 85'	Stadium: Dalga Arena; Attendance: 600; Referee: Rahim Hasanov

25 August 2018 3	Gabala	1 – 1	Sumgayit	Qabala
18:00 AZST (UTC+4)	Khalilzade 43' (pen.) (yellow card) 90+1'	Report	N.Gurbanov (yellow card) 33' (yellow-red card) 77'; Malikov (yellow card) 42'; Isayev (yellow card) 45+1'; Y.Nabiyev 90+3'	Stadium: Gabala City Stadium; Attendance: 300; Referee: Ravan Həmzəzadə

16 September 2018 4	Sabah	1 – 0	Gabala	Masazır
19:00 AZST (UTC+4)	Dević 23'; M.Isayev (yellow card) 45+2' (yellow-red card) 75'; K.Diniyev (yellow card) 70'; Stamenković (yellow card) 90+4'	Report	Adeniyi (yellow card) 28'; R.Aliyev (yellow card) 37'	Stadium: Alinja Arena; Attendance: 1,200; Referee: Rauf Jabbarov

23 September 2018 5	Qarabağ	4 – 1	Gabala	Baku
20:30 AZST (UTC+4)	Zoubir 30', 73'; Abdullayev 45+1'; Delarge 61'; Garayev (yellow card) 89'; Rzeźniczak (yellow card) 90+2'; Sadygov (yellow card) 90+2'	Report	Stanković (yellow card) 45'; Abbasov (yellow card) 86'; Ramaldanov 90'; Khalilzade (red card) 90+2'	Stadium: Azersun Arena; Attendance: 2,300; Referee: Aliyar Aghayev

30 September 2018 6	Gabala	1 – 1	Keşla	Qabala
18:00 AZST (UTC+4)	Stanković (yellow card) 7'; Ramaldanov (yellow card) 35'; Joseph-Monrose 75'	Report	Girdvainis (yellow card) 3'; Yunanov 5'; Mitrović (yellow card) 78'; Aghayev (yellow card) 90+2'	Stadium: Gabala City Stadium; Attendance: 500; Referee: Ravan Həmzəzadə

5 October 2018 7	Zira	1 – 0	Gabala	Baku
18:00 AZST (UTC+4)	Qirtimov (yellow card) 52'; Naghiyev (yellow card) 62'; Radivojević 86'	Report	Gurbanov (yellow card) 11'; Adeniyi (yellow card) 40'; Q.Alıyev (yellow card) 90+1'	Stadium: Dalga Arena; Attendance: 400; Referee: Rauf Jabbarov

20 October 2018 8	Gabala	3 – 1	Neftchi Baku	Qabala
17:00 AZST (UTC+4)	Adeniyi 14', 77'; Jamalov (yellow card) 34'; Ramaldanov (yellow card) 41'; Joseph-Monrose 57'; Khalilzade (yellow card) 59' (yellow-red card) 67'; Ag.Mammadov (yellow card) 85'	Report	Mahmudov (yellow card) 59'; Petrov (yellow card) 64'; A.Krivotsyuk (yellow card) 82'; Karikari 90+4'	Stadium: Gabala City Stadium; Attendance: 700; Referee: Rahim Həsənov

27 October 2018 9	Sumgayit	2 – 2	Gabala	Baku
18:00 AZST (UTC+4)	S.Aliyev 7', 19' (yellow card) 90+2'; Taghiyev (yellow card) 65'; Yildirim (yellow card) 72'; Mahammadov (yellow card) 90+2'	Report	Joseph-Monrose 42'; R.Aliyev (yellow card) 45' (yellow-red card) 90+2'; Atakora 56' (yellow card) 84'; J.Huseynov (yellow card) 71'; Ag.Mammadov (yellow card) 90+2'; Gurbanov (yellow card) 90+2'; Mustafazade (red card) 90+2'	Stadium: Dalga Arena; Attendance: 200; Referee: Orkhan Məmmədov

4 November 2018 10	Gabala	2 – 1	Sabah	Qabala
17:00 AZST (UTC+4)	Adeniyi 5'; Joseph-Monrose 15'; Q.Alıyev (yellow card) 87'; Gurbanov (yellow card) 89'	Report	B.Soltanov 52'; Bosančić (yellow card) 77'	Stadium: Gabala City Stadium; Attendance: 800; Referee: Ravan Həmzəzadə

11 November 2018 11	Gabala	1 – 3	Qarabağ	Qabala
17:30 AZST (UTC+4)	Adeniyi 31' (yellow card) 39'; Jamalov (yellow card) 50'	Report	Emeghara 47'; Míchel 65'; Ozobić 68'	Stadium: Gabala City Stadium; Attendance: 800; Referee: Rauf Jabbarov

24 November 2018 12	Keşla	1 – 2	Gabala	Baku
16:30 AZST (UTC+4)	Yunanov 38'; S.Tashkin (yellow card) 90'; Guidileye (yellow card) 90+4'	Report	Khalilzade (yellow card) 11'; Adeniyi 17' (yellow card) 67'; Stanković 20'; Lilaj (yellow card) 33'; Abbasov (yellow card) 36'; Joseph-Monrose (yellow card) 48'	Stadium: ASK Arena; Attendance: 500; Referee: Ravan Həmzəzadə

2 December 2018 13	Gabala	0 – 0	Zira	Qabala
17:00 AZST (UTC+4)	Abbasov (yellow card) 47'; Khalilzade (yellow card) 52'; Jamalov (yellow card) 54'; Huseynov (yellow card) 90'	Report	Fardjad-Azad (yellow card) 15'; Hamdi (yellow card) 39' (yellow-red card) 61'; I.Muradov (yellow card) 38'; K.Mirzayev (yellow card) 61'	Stadium: Gabala City Stadium; Attendance: 250; Referee: Vugar Həsənli
Note: Match was postponed in the 58th minute due to fog, with the remaining minutes being played on 3 December 2018 from 13:00.

9 December 2018 14	Sabail	0 – 0	Gabala	Baku
17:30 AZST (UTC+4)	Kitanovski (yellow card) 55'; Rahimov (yellow card) 70'; Jarjué (yellow card) 70'	Report	R.Aliyev (yellow card) 10' (yellow-red card) 85'	Stadium: Bayil Arena; Attendance: 500; Referee: Ingilab Məmmədov

3 February 2019 15	Gabala	1 – 0	Sumgayit	Qabala
14:00 AZST (UTC+4)	Volkovi (yellow card) 43'; A.Seydiyev (yellow card) 57'; Abbasov (yellow card) 79'; Joseph-Monrose 84'	Report		Stadium: Gabala City Stadium; Attendance: 530; Referee: Aliyar Aghayev

9 February 2019 16	Sabah	0 – 1	Gabala	Masazır
16:00 AZST (UTC+4)	Dević (yellow card) 17' (yellow-red card) 45+1'; Eyyubov (yellow card) 29'; Diniyev (yellow card) 47'	Report	R.Aliyev 31'; A.Seydiyev (yellow card) 53'; Jamalov (yellow card) 57'	Stadium: Alinja Arena; Attendance: 600; Referee: Səbuhi Bayramov

17 February 2019 17	Qarabağ	2 – 1	Gabala	Baku
17:30 AZST (UTC+4)	Richard 4' (pen.); Quintana (yellow card) 25'; Huseynov (yellow card) 28'; Ozobić 30'; Hajili (yellow card) 45+3'	Report	Huseynov 29' (pen.) (yellow card) 76'; Jamalov (yellow card) 39'	Stadium: Tofiq Bahramov Republican Stadium; Attendance: 2,00; Referee: Rahim Həsənov

23 February 2019 18	Gabala	0 – 0	Keşla	Qabala
14:00 AZST (UTC+4)	Abbasov (yellow card) 73'; A.Seydiyev (yellow card) 90+3'	Report	Peña (yellow card) 29'; Isgandarli (yellow card) 82'; Denis (yellow card) 90'	Stadium: Gabala City Stadium; Attendance: 650; Referee: Rəşad Ahmədov

3 March 2019 19	Zira	1 – 1	Gabala	Zirə
15:00 AZST (UTC+4)	Fofana 87' (yellow card) 90+3'	Report	J.Huseynov (yellow card) 20'; B.Hasanalizade 57' (o.g.); Ramaldanov (yellow card) 70'	Stadium: Zira Olympic Sport Complex Stadium; Attendance: 600; Referee: Ingilab Məmmədov

10 March 2019 20	Gabala	2 – 1	Sabail	Qabala
14:00 AZST (UTC+4)	Adeniyi (yellow card) 45+1' (goal) 49', 55'; Mustafazade (yellow card) 62' (yellow-red card) 73'	Report	Gurbanov (yellow card) 22'; Cociuc (yellow card) 34'; Yunuszade (yellow card) 54' (goal) 84'; Koubemba (yellow card) 70'	Stadium: Gabala City Stadium; Attendance: 550; Referee: Ingilab Məmmədov

15 March 2019 21	Neftchi Baku	1 – 1	Gabala	Baku
19:00 AZST (UTC+4)	Mustivar (yellow card) 33'; Mbodj 54' (yellow card) 78'	Report	Jamalov (yellow card) 30'; Joseph-Monrose 72' (yellow card) 90'	Stadium: Bakcell Arena; Attendance: 1,300; Referee: Sabuhi Bayramov

1 April 2019 22	Gabala	0 – 0	Sabah	Qabala
14:00 AZST (UTC+4)	Stanković (yellow card) 10'; As.Mammadov (yellow card) 40'	Report	K.Diniyev (yellow card) 15' (yellow-red card) 90+1'; V.Abdullayev (yellow card) 26'; Diniyev (yellow card) 67'	Stadium: Gabala City Stadium; Attendance: 300; Referee: Rauf Jabbarov

7 April 2019 23	Gabala	1 – 2	Qarabağ	Qabala
14:00 AZST (UTC+4)	R.Aliyev 23' (yellow card) 75'; Volkovi (yellow card) 24'; Stanković (yellow card) 26'	Report	Guerrier 3' (yellow card) 67'; Huseynov (yellow card) 58'; Abdullayev 83'	Stadium: Gabala City Stadium; Attendance: 1,600; Referee: Sabuhi Bayramov

14 April 2019 24	Keşla	1 – 2	Gabala	Baku
15:00 AZST (UTC+4)	S.Alkhasov (yellow card) 55'; Kamara 76'; Ayité (yellow card) 79'	Report	Adeniyi 46' (yellow card) 60'; Volkovi 65'; Bezotosnyi (yellow card) 77'; R.Aliyev (yellow card) 84'	Stadium: ASK Arena; Attendance: 1,700; Referee: Vugar Həsənli

19 April 2019 25	Gabala	2 – 1	Zira	Qabala
16:00 AZST (UTC+4)	Volkovi 20' (yellow card) 87'; Adeniyi 56'; Jamalov (yellow card) 62'; Mammadov (yellow card) 67'	Report	Fardjad-Azad (yellow card) 12'; K.Mirzayev (yellow card) 14'; Tounkara 71'; B.Hasanalizade (yellow card) 74'	Stadium: Gabala City Stadium; Attendance: 300; Referee: Ingilab Məmmədov

27 April 2019 26	Sabail	2 – 1	Gabala	Baku
17:30 AZST (UTC+4)	F.Muradbayli 20'; Ramazanov 25' (yellow card) 74'; Rahimov (yellow card) 78'; Akpoveta (yellow card) 83'; E.Ahmadov (yellow card) 84'	Report	Mustafazade 41'; Huseynov (yellow card) 43'; Atakora (yellow card) 69'	Stadium: Bayil Arena; Attendance: 500; Referee: Aliyar Aghayev

5 May 2019 27	Gabala	1 – 3	Neftchi Baku	Qabala
18:00 AZST (UTC+4)	A.Seydiyev (yellow card) 8'; Ramaldanov (yellow card) 57'; R.Aliyev 84'; Stanković (yellow card) 90+2'	Report	Mbodj 25'; Mahmudov (yellow card) 59'; Krivotsyuk (yellow card) 68'; Dabo 71', 90' (pen.)	Stadium: Gabala City Stadium; Attendance: 800; Referee: Səbuhi Bayramov

11 May 2019 28	Sumgayit	1 – 0	Gabala	Sumqayit
16:00 AZST (UTC+4)	Hüseynov (yellow card) 64'; U.Iskandarov 68'; N.Gurbanov (yellow card) 78'; R.Azizli (yellow card) 90+5'	Report	Muradov (yellow card) 45'; J.Huseynov (yellow card) 57'; Stanković (yellow card) 71'; Jamalov (yellow card) 88'; R.Aliyev (yellow card) 90+3'	Stadium: Kapital Bank Arena; Attendance: 1,000; Referee: Raad Əhmədov

==== League table ====
Pos	Team	Pld	W	D	L	GF	GA	GD	Pts	Qualification or relegation
2	Neftçi Baku	28	17	7	4	52	26	+26	58	Qualification for the Europa League first qualifying round
3	Sabail	28	12	5	11	34	37	−3	41	Qualification for the Europa League first qualifying round
4	Gabala	28	9	9	10	31	33	−2	36	Qualification for the Europa League second qualifying round
5	Zira	28	8	7	13	30	40	−10	31	
6	Sumgayit	28	8	5	15	24	42	−18	29	

Source: Soccerway
Rules for classification: 1) Points; 2) Head-to-head points; 3) Head-to-head goal difference; 4) Head-to-head goals scored; 5) Head-to-head away goals scored (only if two teams); 6) Goal difference; 7) Goals scored.

=== Azerbaijan Cup ===
16 December 2018 Quarterfinal 1st leg	Gabala	1 – 0	Sabah	Qabala
14:00 AZT (UTC+4)	Ivanović 45' (o.g.)	Report	Ivanović (yellow card) 59'	Stadium: Gabala City Stadium; Attendance: 150; Referee: Ravan Həmzəzadə

20 December 2018 Quarterfinal 2nd leg	Sabah	0 – 1 (0 – 2 agg.)	Gabala	Masazır
16:00 AZT (UTC+4)	S.Seyidov (yellow card) 35'; E.Nabiyev (yellow card) 39'; V.Abdullayev (yellow card) 45'; Ramos (yellow card) 53' (yellow-red card) 83'; E.Turabov (yellow card) 67'	Report	Joseph-Monrose (yellow card) 9'; Adeniyi (yellow card) 44' (goal) 80'	Stadium: Alinja Arena; Attendance: 400; Referee: Aliyar Aghayev

23 April 2019 Semifinal 1st leg	Gabala	1 – 0	Qarabağ	Qabala
16:00 AZT (UTC+4)	A.Seydiyev (yellow card) 29'; Joseph-Monrose (yellow card) 39'; Adeniyi 72'; Lilaj (yellow card) 85'; R.Aliyev (yellow card) 87'	Report	Madatov (yellow card) 35'; Zoubir (yellow card) 84'	Stadium: Gabala City Stadium; Attendance: 1,800; Referee: Vugar Hasanli

1 May 2019 Semifinal 2nd leg	Qarabağ	2 – 1 (2 – 2 a agg.)	Gabala	Baku
17:00 AZT (UTC+4)	Madatov (yellow card) 30'; Míchel 37' (red card) 90+5'; Quintana 58'	Report	Huseynov (yellow card) 20'; Stanković (yellow card) 49'; A.Seydiyev (yellow card) 65'; Volkovi 82'; Lilaj (yellow card) 83'; Atakora (yellow card) 85'; Nazirov (yellow card) 90+1'	Stadium: Tofiq Bahramov Republican Stadium; Attendance: 2,000; Referee: İnqilab Məmmədov

==== Final ====
19 May 2019	Gabala	1 – 0	Sumgayit	Nakhchivan
16:30 AZT (UTC+4)	Joseph-Monrose 3' (yellow card) 90+5'; R.Aliyev (yellow card) 45'; Nazirov (yellow card) 90+2'; Mustafazade (yellow card) 90+6'	Report	Naghiyev (yellow card) 60'; Y.Nabiyev (yellow card) 70'; Hüseynov (yellow card) 90+1'; Taghiyev (red card) 90+5'	Stadium: Nakhchivan City Stadium; Attendance: 10,000; Referee: İnqilab Məmmədov

=== UEFA Europa League ===
==== Qualifying rounds ====
12 July 2018 First qualifying round 1st leg	Gabala (Azerbaijan)	0 – 2	(Luxembourg) Progrès Niederkorn	Qabala, Azerbaijan
20:00 AZST (UTC+4)	Joseph-Monrose (yellow card) 15'; Khalilzade (yellow card) 84'	Report	De Almeida 51'; O.Thill 61' (pen.); S.Thill (yellow card) 65'; Flauss (yellow card) 72'	Stadium: Gabala City Stadium; Attendance: 1,600; Referee: Veaceslav Banari (Macedonia)

19 July 2018 First qualifying round 2nd leg	Progrès Niederkorn (Luxembourg)	0 – 1 (2 – 1 agg.)	(Azerbaijan) Gabala	Differdange, Luxembourg
21:30 AZST (UTC+4)	Karapetian (yellow card) 69'; Mutsch (yellow card) 86'; O.Thill (yellow card) 88' da Graça (yellow card) 90+3'	Report	Ramaldanov (yellow card) 17'; Joseph-Monrose 28'; R.Aliyev (yellow card) 65'; Abbasov (yellow card) 73'; Khalilzade (red card) 79'; J.Huseynov (yellow card) 79'; Adeniyi (yellow card) 89'	Stadium: Stade Municipal; Referee: Keith Kennedy (Northern Ireland)
Note: Progrès Niederkorn played their home matches at Stade Municipal, Differdange, instead of their regular stadium Stade Jos Haupert, Niederkorn.

== Squad statistics ==
As of Match played 19 May 2019

=== Appearances and goals ===
No.	Pos	Nat	Player	Total		Premier League		Azerbaijan Cup		Europa League	
No.	Pos	Nat	Player	Apps	Goals	Apps	Goals	Apps	Goals	Apps	Goals
1	GK	(Azerbaijan) AZE	Anar Nazirov	7	0	3+1	0	3	0	0	0
2	MF	(Azerbaijan) AZE	Amin Seydiyev	15	0	12	0	2+1	0	0	0
3	DF	(Serbia) SRB	Vojislav Stanković	30	1	24	1	5	0	1	0
4	MF	(Azerbaijan) AZE	Elvin Jamalov	27	0	21	0	4+1	0	1	0
5	DF	(Azerbaijan) AZE	Rasim Ramaldanov	14	1	9+3	1	0+1	0	1	0
7	FW	(Azerbaijan) AZE	Roman Huseynov	4	0	1+2	0	0	0	0+1	0
8	MF	(Azerbaijan) AZE	Qismət Alıyev	15	0	9+3	0	1+2	0	0	0
9	FW	(Georgia (country)) GEO	Davit Volkovi	16	3	11+2	2	3	1	0	0
10	FW	(Azerbaijan) AZE	Rauf Aliyev	30	4	16+7	4	4+1	0	2	0
11	MF	(Azerbaijan) AZE	Asif Mammadov	27	1	8+14	1	1+2	0	2	0
14	MF	(Azerbaijan) AZE	Javid Huseynov	30	1	21+3	1	4+1	0	1	0
17	FW	(Nigeria) NGR	James Adeniyi	31	12	24+1	10	4	2	2	0
18	MF	(Azerbaijan) AZE	Ilgar Gurbanov	21	0	13+5	0	1	0	2	0
21	MF	(Togo) TOG	Lalawélé Atakora	29	1	16+7	1	1+3	0	0+2	0
22	GK	(Ukraine) UKR	Dmytro Bezotosnyi	25	0	21	0	2	0	2	0
27	DF	(Azerbaijan) AZE	Bahlul Mustafazade	29	1	21+2	1	5	0	1	0
28	FW	(France) FRA	Steeven Joseph-Monrose	31	8	23+2	6	4	1	2	1
34	DF	(Azerbaijan) AZE	Urfan Abbasov	32	1	24+1	1	5	0	2	0
35	GK	(Azerbaijan) AZE	Murad Popov	1	0	0+1	0	0	0	0	0
77	MF	(Azerbaijan) AZE	Samir Gurbanov	1	0	0+1	0	0	0	0	0
88	MF	(Albania) ALB	Sabien Lilaj	29	0	15+8	0	4	0	2	0
98	MF	(Azerbaijan) AZE	Rovlan Muradov	2	0	1	0	0+1	0	0	0
Players away from Gabala on loan:
Players who left Gabala during the season:
30	GK	(Azerbaijan) AZE	Agil Mammadov	4	0	4	0	0	0	0	0
33	MF	(Azerbaijan) AZE	Tamkin Khalilzade	15	1	11	1	2	0	1+1	0

=== Goal scorers ===
Place	Position	Nation	Number	Name	Premier League	Azerbaijan Cup	Europa League	Total
1	FW	(Nigeria)	17	James Adeniyi	10	2	0	12
2	FW	(France)	28	Steeven Joseph-Monrose	6	1	1	8
3	FW	(Azerbaijan)	10	Rauf Aliyev	4	0	0	4
4	FW	(Georgia (country))	9	Davit Volkovi	2	1	0	3
5				Own goal	1	1	0	2
6	MF	(Azerbaijan)	11	Asif Mammadov	1	0	0	1
6	DF	(Azerbaijan)	34	Urfan Abbasov	1	0	0	1
6	MF	(Azerbaijan)	33	Tamkin Khalilzade	1	0	0	1
6	DF	(Azerbaijan)	5	Rasim Ramaldanov	1	0	0	1
6	MF	(Togo)	21	Lalawélé Atakora	1	0	0	1
6	DF	(Serbia)	3	Vojislav Stanković	1	0	0	1
6	MF	(Azerbaijan)	14	Javid Huseynov	1	0	0	1
6	DF	(Azerbaijan)	27	Bahlul Mustafazade	1	0	0	1
				TOTALS	31	5	1	37

=== Disciplinary record ===
Number	Nation	Position	Name	Premier League		Azerbaijan Cup		Europa League		Total	
Number	Nation	Position	Name	Yellow card	Red card	Yellow card	Red card	Yellow card	Red card	Yellow card	Red card
1	(Azerbaijan)	GK	Anar Nazirov	0	0	2	0	0	0	2	0
2	(Azerbaijan)	MF	Amin Seydiyev	4	0	2	0	0	0	6	0
3	(Serbia)	DF	Vojislav Stanković	6	0	1	0	0	0	7	0
4	(Azerbaijan)	MF	Elvin Jamalov	9	0	0	0	0	0	9	0
5	(Azerbaijan)	DF	Rasim Ramaldanov	4	0	0	0	1	0	5	0
8	(Azerbaijan)	MF	Qismət Alıyev	2	0	0	0	0	0	2	0
9	(Georgia (country))	FW	Davit Volkovi	3	0	0	0	0	0	3	0
10	(Azerbaijan)	FW	Rauf Aliyev	9	2	2	0	1	0	12	2
11	(Azerbaijan)	MF	Asif Mammadov	1	0	0	0	0	0	1	0
14	(Azerbaijan)	MF	Javid Huseynov	6	0	1	0	0	0	7	0
17	(Nigeria)	FW	James Adeniyi	6	0	1	0	1	0	8	0
18	(Azerbaijan)	MF	Ilgar Gurbanov	3	0	0	0	1	0	4	0
21	(Togo)	MF	Lalawélé Atakora	2	0	1	0	0	0	3	0
22	(Ukraine)	GK	Dmytro Bezotosnyi	1	0	0	0	0	0	1	0
27	(Azerbaijan)	DF	Bahlul Mustafazade	2	2	1	0	0	0	3	2
28	(France)	FW	Steeven Joseph-Monrose	2	0	3	0	1	0	6	0
34	(Azerbaijan)	DF	Urfan Abbasov	6	0	0	0	1	0	7	0
88	(Albania)	MF	Sabien Lilaj	1	0	2	0	0	0	3	0
98	(Azerbaijan)	MF	Rovlan Muradov	1	0	0	0	0	0	1	0
Players who left Gabala during the season:
30	(Azerbaijan)	GK	Agil Mammadov	2	0	0	0	0	0	2	0
33	(Azerbaijan)	MF	Tamkin Khalilzade	5	2	0	0	1	1	6	3
			TOTALS	72	6	16	0	7	1	95	7
