= Rauf Aliyev =

Azerbaijani footballer (born 1989)

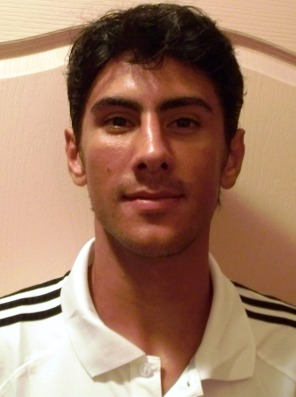

Personal information
- Full name: Rauf Sahraman oğlu Aliyev
- Date of birth: 12 February 1989 (age 37)
- Place of birth: Füzuli, Azerbaijani SSR
- Height: 1.85 m (6 ft 1 in)
- Position: Striker

Youth career
- –2006: Qarabağ

Senior career*
Years	Team	Apps	(Gls)
2006–2013	Qarabağ	131	(23)
2013–2014	Baku	38	(11)
2014–2015	Khazar Lankaran	12	(3)
2015	Neftçi	11	(0)
2015–2017	Inter Baku	36	(12)
2017	Kukësi	13	(3)
2018–2019	Gabala	23	(4)
2019	Neftçi	9	(1)
2020–2022	Sabail	41	(4)
2022–2023	Kapaz	4	(0)
Total		318	(61)

International career
2005	Azerbaijan U17	2	(0)
2007–2008	Azerbaijan U19	6	(0)
2009	Azerbaijan U21	2	(0)
2010–	Azerbaijan	46	(7)
- * Club domestic league appearances and goals

Rauf Sahraman oğlu Aliyev (Azerbaijani: Rauf Səhraman oğlu Əliyev, born 12 February 1989) is an Azerbaijani former international footballer who played as a striker. He made his national debut in an away friendly match against Jordan on 25 February 2010.

== Club career ==
In August 2017, Aliyev signed for Kukësi, which competes in the Kategoria e Parë.

On 28 March 2018, Gabala FK announced the signing of Aliyev on a contract until the summer of 2019.

On 10 June 2019, Aliyev signed a one-year contract with Neftçi PFK. On 8 January 2020, Aliyev was released by Neftçi, going on to sign with Sabail on 11 January 2020 until the end of the season.

== Career statistics ==
=== Club ===
As of 8 March 2020

Appearances and goals by club, season and competition
Club	Season	League			Cup		Continental		Other		Total	
Club	Season	Division	Apps	Goals	Apps	Goals	Apps	Goals	Apps	Goals	Apps	Goals
Qarabağ	2006–07	Azerbaijan Top League	11	1			0	0	—		11+	1+
Qarabağ	2007–08	Azerbaijan Premier League	7	1	1+	2+	—		—		8+	3+
Qarabağ	2008–09	Azerbaijan Premier League	8	1			—		—		8+	1+
Qarabağ	2009–10	Azerbaijan Premier League	27	5	2	0	5	0	—		34	5
Qarabağ	2010–11	Azerbaijan Premier League	31	10	1	0	7	1	—		39	11
Qarabağ	2011–12	Azerbaijan Premier League	29	5	4	1	5	2	—		38	8
Qarabağ	2012–13	Azerbaijan Premier League	18	0	1	0	—		—		19	0
Qarabağ	Total		131	23	9+	3+	17	3	0	0	157+	29+
Baku	2012–13	Azerbaijan Premier League	11	2	2	0	0	0	—		13	2
Baku	2013–14	Azerbaijan Premier League	27	9	2	0	—		—		29	9
Baku	Total		38	11	4	0	0	0	0	0	42	11
Khazar Lankaran	2014–15	Azerbaijan Premier League	12	3	0	0	—		—		12	3
Neftçi	2014–15	Azerbaijan Premier League	11	0	2	0	0	0	—		13	0
Inter Baku	2015–16	Azerbaijan Premier League	10	1	1	0	6	1	—		17	2
Inter Baku	2016–17	Azerbaijan Premier League	26	11	4	3	—		—		30	14
Inter Baku	2017–18	Azerbaijan Premier League	0	0	0	0	4	1	—		4	1
Inter Baku	Total		36	12	5	3	10	2	0	0	51	17
Kukësi	2017–18	Kategoria Superiore	13	3	3	1	0	0	1	0	17	4
Gabala	2018–19	Azerbaijan Premier League	23	4	5	0	2	0	—		30	4
Neftçi	2019–20	Azerbaijan Premier League	9	1	0	0	6	1	—		15	2
Sabail	2019–20	Azerbaijan Premier League	5	3	0	0	0	0	—		5	3
Career total			278	60	28+	7+	35	6	1	0	342+	73+

=== International ===
As of 10 September 2018

Azerbaijan
Year	Apps	Goals
2010	9	0
2011	8	3
2012	8	2
2013	10	2
2014	7	0
2015	1	0
2016	0	0
2017	1	0
2018	2	0
Total	46	7

International goals
No.	Date	Venue	Opponent	Score	Result	Competition
1.	2 September 2011	Tofiq Bahramov Republican Stadium, Baku, Azerbaijan	Belgium	1–1	1–1	UEFA Euro 2012 qualification
2.	6 September 2011	Tofiq Bahramov Republican Stadium, Baku, Azerbaijan	Kazakhstan	1–1	3–2	UEFA Euro 2012 qualification
3.	11 November 2011	Qemal Stafa Stadium, Tirana, Albania	Albania	1–0	1–0	Friendly
4.	24 February 2012	The Sevens Stadium, Dubai, United Arab Emirates	Singapore	1–0	2–2	Friendly
5.	14 November 2012	Windsor Park, Belfast, Northern Ireland	Northern Ireland	1–0	1–1	2014 FIFA World Cup qualification
6.	14 August 2013	Eighth Kilometer District Stadium, Baku, Azerbaijan	Malta	2–0	3–0	Friendly
7.	15 November 2013	Lilleküla Stadium, Tallinn, Estonia	Estonia	1–0	1–2	Friendly

== Honours ==
=== Club ===
Qarabağ

- Azerbaijan Cup: 2008–09

Gabala

- Azerbaijan Cup: 2018–19

=== Individual ===
- Azerbaijani Footballer of the Year: 2011
- APL Best Forward: 2011–12
- Azerbaijan Premier League Top Scorer (1): 2016–17
