= Shkëlzen Kelmendi =

Albanian footballer

Personal information
- Date of birth: 14 January 1985 (age 41)
- Place of birth: Shkodër, Albania
- Height: 1.88 m (6 ft 2 in)
- Position: Midfielder

Youth career
- 2000–2003: Vllaznia Shkodër

Senior career*
| Years | Team | Apps | (Gls) |
| 2003–2005 | Erzeni | | |
| 2005–2006 | Vllaznia | 16 | (0) |
| 2007–2008 | Skrapari | 25 | (1) |
| 2008–2010 | Apolonia | 46 | (0) |
| 2011–2014 | Bylis | 53 | (1) |
| 2014 | Sopoti | 11 | (0) |
| 2015 | Kastrioti | 4 | (1) |
| 2015–2016 | Sopoti | 17 | (0) |
| 2016–2017 | Turbina | 5 | (0) |

International career
| 2003 | Albania U-19 | 0 | (0) |
- * Club domestic league appearances and goals as of 18 May 2015

Shkëlzen Kelmendi (born 14 January 1985) is an Albanian football player who most recently played for Turbina in the Albanian First Division.

== Club career ==
He played three seasons for Bylis. In 2015, he signed for Kastrioti.
