= Lalawélé Atakora =

Togolese footballer (born 1990)

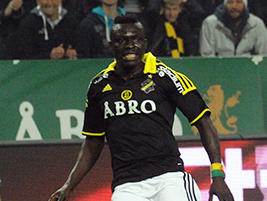

Personal information
- Full name: Lalawélé "Lala" Atakora
- Date of birth: 9 November 1990 (age 36)
- Place of birth: Lomé, Togo
- Height: 1.68 m (5 ft 6 in)
- Positions: Winger; forward

Team information
- Current team: FCO Tourangeau

Youth career
- Liberty Academy

Senior career*
Years	Team	Apps	(Gls)
2009–2011	Fredrikstad	7	(0)
2010	→ IFK Värnamo (loan)	11	(3)
2011	→ AIK (loan)	7	(1)
2012–2014	AIK	40	(3)
2013–2014	→ Balıkesirspor (loan)	36	(5)
2015–2016	Helsingborgs IF	50	(3)
2017–2018	Adana Demirspor	32	(3)
2018–2019	Gabala	23	(1)
2019–2020	Kazma		
2020–2021	ASKO Kara		
2021	Syrianska	22	(11)
2022–	FCO Tourangeau		

International career^{‡}
2007	Togo U17	3	(1)
2011–	Togo	47	(2)
- * Club domestic league appearances and goals as of 6 June 2022 ‡ National team caps and goals as of 8 September 2013

Lalawélé Atakora (also known as Atakora Lalawélé; born 9 November 1990) is a Togolese footballer who plays for FCO Tourangeau as a winger.

== Career ==
=== Club career ===
On 20 June 2017, Lalawélé signed with Adana Demirspor.

On 3 July 2018, Gabala FK announced the signing of Lalawélé on a one-year contract, with Gabala confirmed his release at the end of his contract on 4 June 2019. On 20 August 2019 it was confirmed, that Lalawélé had joined Kuwaiti club Kazma SC in the Kuwait Premier League. After a spell in Togolese ASKO Kara, he joined the Swedish fourth-tier club Syrianska in 2021.

=== International career ===
He represented Togo in the 2007 FIFA U-17 World Cup in South Korea and played all three group stage matches, scoring one goal.

In 2011, he played for Togo in the WAFU Nations Cup, a West African championship. Togo won the final against Nigeria 3-2 and Lalawelé was the match winner with his two goals and an assist.

== Career statistics ==
=== Club ===
As of match played 19 May 2019

Appearances and goals by club, season and competition
Club	Season	League			National Cup		Continental		Other		Total	
Club	Season	Division	Apps	Goals	Apps	Goals	Apps	Goals	Apps	Goals	Apps	Goals
Fredrikstad	2009	Tippeligaen	2	0	0	0	–		–		2	0
Fredrikstad	2010	Adeccoligaen	5	0	0	0	–		–		5	0
Fredrikstad	Total		7	0	0	0	-	-	-	-	7	0
IFK Värnamo (loan)	2010	Div. 1 Södra	11	3	0	0	–		–		11	3
AIK (loan)	2011	Allsvenskan	7	1	0	0	–		–		7	1
AIK	2012	Allsvenskan	22	1	2	0	8	0	1	0	33	1
AIK	2013	Allsvenskan	9	1	1	0	–		–		10	1
AIK	2014	Allsvenskan	2	0	0	0	1	0	–		3	0
AIK	Total		33	2	3	0	9	0	1	0	46	2
Balıkesirspor (loan)	2013–14	TFF First League	36	5	3	0	–		–		39	5
Helsingborgs IF	2015	Allsvenskan	27	2	4	2	–		–		31	4
Helsingborgs IF	2016	Allsvenskan	23	1	5	0	–		–		28	1
Helsingborgs IF	Total		50	3	9	2	-	-	-	-	59	5
Adana Demirspor	2017–18	TFF First League	32	3	1	0	–		–		33	3
Gabala	2018–19	Azerbaijan Premier League	23	1	4	0	2	0	–		29	1
Career total			199	18	20	2	11	0	1	0	231	20

=== International ===
Togo national team
Year	Apps	Goals
2011	4	0
2012	2	0
2013	5	1
2014	3	0
2015	4	0
2016	7	1
2017	11	0
2018	5	0
2019	6	0
Total	47	2

Statistics accurate as of match played 18 November 2019

=== International goals ===
Scores and results list Togo's goal tally first.

No	Date	Venue	Opponent	Score	Result	Competition
1.	8 September 2013	Stade de Kégué, Lomé, Togo	DR Congo	1–0	2–1	2014 FIFA World Cup qualification
2.	4 October 2016	Stade de Kégué, Lomé, Togo?	Uganda	1–0	1–0	Friendly

== Honours ==
Gabala

- Azerbaijan Cup: 2018–19
