= 2024–25 Qarabağ FK season =

Qarabağ FK
2024–25 season
- Manager: Gurban Gurbanov
- Stadium: Republican Stadium; Azersun Arena
- Premier League: 1st (champions)
- Azerbaijan Cup: Runners-up
- UEFA Champions League: Play-off round vs Dinamo Zagreb
- UEFA Europa League: League phase (36th)
- Top goalscorer: League: Leandro Andrade (15); All: Leandro Andrade (17)
- Highest home attendance: 29,800 (vs Dinamo Zagreb, 28 August 2024)
- Lowest home attendance: 400 (vs Sabail, 11 February 2025)
- Average home league attendance: 1,729
- Biggest win: 5–0 (vs. Lincoln Red Imps (H), 30 July 2024); 2–7 (vs. Ludogorets Razgrad (A), 13 August 2024); 5–0 (vs. Kapaz (A), 18 October 2024); 5–0 (vs. Sumgayit (H), 16 December 2024); 5–0 (vs. Sabail (H), 11 February 2025)
- Biggest defeat: 0–3 (vs. Dinamo Zagreb (A), 20 August 2024); 0–3 (vs. Tottenham Hotspur (A), 26 September 2024); 0–3 (vs. Ajax (A), 24 October 2024); 1–4 (vs. Lyon (H), 28 November 2024); 0–3 (vs. Olympiacos (A), 31 January 2025)
Home colours	Away colours	Third colours

The 2024–25 season was Qarabağ FK's 74th year since its founding and its 33th consecutive season in Azerbaijan's premier league. The team will also compete in the Azerbaijan Cup, the UEFA Champions League, and the UEFA Europa League.

== Season overview ==
On 11 June, Qarabağ announced the signing of Fabijan Buntić from Vizela on a contract until the summer of 2027.

On 14 June, Qarabağ announced the return of Musa Qurbanlı from Djurgarden on a contract until the summer of 2027.

On 18 July, Qarabağ announced the signing of Shakhruddin Magomedaliyev from Adana Demirspor to a one-year contract.

On 15 August, Qarabağ announced the signing of Mateusz Kochalski from Stal Mielec on a contract until the summer of 2028.

On 23 August, Qarabağ announced the signing of Emmanuel Addai from AD Alcorcón on a contract until the summer of 2026.

On 3 September, Qarabağ announced the signing of Oleksiy Kashchuk from Shakhtar Donetsk on a contract until the summer of 2027.

On 9 September, Hamidou Keyta was released from his contract with the club.

On 13 January, Qarabağ announced that they had agreed a fee with CR Flamengo, rumoured to be around €5million, for Juninho, with the forward travelling to Rio de Janeiro to finalise the deal. Two days later, on 15 January, Qarabağ and Flamengo both confirmed the transfer of Juninho.

On 4 February, Qarabağ announced the return of Kady Borges from Ferencváros on a four-year contract.

== Squad ==
As of match played 31 May 2025

No.	Name	Nationality	Position	Date of birth (age)	Signed from	Signed in	Contract ends	Apps.	Goals
Goalkeepers
1	Shakhruddin Magomedaliyev	(Azerbaijan)	GK	12 June 1994 (aged 30)	Sumgayit	2024	2027	149	0
12	Sadig Mammadzade	(Azerbaijan)	GK	29 October 2006 (aged 18)	Sabail	2024		1	0
89	Amin Ramazanov	(Azerbaijan)	GK	20 January 2003 (aged 22)	Lokomotiv Moscow	2021		14	0
97	Fabijan Buntić	(Croatia)	GK	24 February 1997 (aged 28)	Vizela	2024	2027	15	0
99	Mateusz Kochalski	(Poland)	GK	20 January 2003 (aged 22)	Stal Mielec	2024	2028	28	0
Defenders
2	Matheus Silva	(Brazil)	DF	3 October 1997 (aged 27)	Lokomotiv Plovdiv	2023	2025 (+2)	87	3
13	Behlul Mustafazade	(Azerbaijan)	DF	27 February 1997 (aged 28)	Unattached	2021		139	5
26	Amin Rzayev	(Azerbaijan)	DF	12 October 2009 (aged 15)	Academy	2025		1	0
27	Toral Bayramov	(Azerbaijan)	DF	23 February 2001 (aged 24)	Academy	2019		208	28
29	Marko Vešović	(Montenegro)	DF	2 May 1996 (aged 29)	Legia Warsaw	2021	2027	135	5
30	Abbas Huseynov	(Azerbaijan)	DF	13 June 1995 (aged 29)	Inter Baku	2017		173	5
32	Hikmat Jabrayilzade	(Azerbaijan)	DF	2 August 2007 (aged 17)	Academy	2024		1	0
44	Elvin Cafarguliyev	(Azerbaijan)	DF	26 October 2000 (aged 24)	Youth team	2019		186	8
55	Badavi Guseynov	(Azerbaijan)	DF	11 July 1991 (aged 33)	Anzhi Makhachkala	2012		379	5
81	Kevin Medina	(Colombia)	DF	9 March 1993 (aged 32)	Chaves	2020		160	4
Midfielders
7	Yassine Benzia	(Algeria)	MF	8 September 1994 (aged 30)	Dijon	2023	2025	104	28
8	Marko Janković	(Montenegro)	MF	9 July 1995 (aged 29)	Hapoel Tel Aviv	2022		126	8
9	Kady Borges	(Brazil)	MF	2 May 1996 (aged 29)	Ferencváros	2025	2028	94	35
10	Abdellah Zoubir	(France)	MF	5 December 1991 (aged 33)	RC Lens	2018		312	69
15	Leandro Andrade	(Cape Verde)	MF	24 September 1999 (aged 25)	Cherno More	2021	2027	162	44
21	Oleksiy Kashchuk	(Ukraine)	MF	29 June 2000 (aged 24)	Shakhtar Donetsk	2024	2027	39	8
24	Aleksey Isayev	(Azerbaijan)	MF	9 November 1995 (aged 29)	Sabah	2024	2027	56	1
66	Patrick Andrade	(Cape Verde)	MF	9 February 1993 (aged 32)	Partizan	2023	2025 (+1)	149	16
Forwards
11	Emmanuel Addai	(Ghana)	FW	1 August 2001 (aged 23)	AD Alcorcón	2024	2026	39	4
19	Redon Xhixha	(Albania)	FW	14 September 1998 (aged 26)	Tirana	2023	2026	73	14
22	Musa Qurbanlı	(Azerbaijan)	FW	13 April 2002 (aged 23)	Djurgarden	2024	2027	90	37
90	Nariman Akhundzade	(Azerbaijan)	FW	23 April 2004 (aged 21)	Youth team	2022		101	28
Away on loan
	Ismayil Ibrahimli	(Azerbaijan)	MF	13 February 1998 (aged 27)	MOIK Baku	2018		107	7
	Rustam Akhmedzade	(Azerbaijan)	FW	25 December 2000 (aged 24)	Mynai	2021	2026	8	0
Left during the season
6	Júlio Romão	(Brazil)	MF	29 March 1998 (aged 27)	Santa Clara	2022	2026	120	2
17	Hamidou Keyta	(France)	FW	17 December 1994 (aged 30)	Zira	2023	2026	54	9
18	Juninho	(Brazil)	FW	21 November 1996 (aged 28)	Chaves	2023	2026	81	42
20	Richard Almeida	(Azerbaijan)	MF	20 March 1989 (aged 36)	Zira	2021		378	64

== Kits ==
Supplier: Adidas / Sponsors: Azersun(chest), Nothreat(sleeve)

Home	Home 2	Away	Third	Third 2	Third 3

Cup Home	Cup Away

Goalkeeper 1	Goalkeeper 2	Goalkeeper 3

== Transfers ==
=== In ===
Date	Position	Nationality	Name	From	Fee	Ref.
11 June 2024	GK	(Croatia)	Fabijan Buntić	Vizela	Undisclosed	
14 June 2024	FW	(Azerbaijan)	Musa Qurbanlı	Djurgarden	Undisclosed	
18 July 2024	GK	(Azerbaijan)	Shakhruddin Magomedaliyev	Adana Demirspor	Undisclosed	
15 August 2024	GK	(Poland)	Mateusz Kochalski	Stal Mielec	Undisclosed	
23 August 2024	FW	(Ghana)	Emmanuel Addai	AD Alcorcón	Undisclosed	
3 September 2024	MF	(Ukraine)	Oleksiy Kashchuk	Shakhtar Donetsk	Undisclosed	
4 February 2025	MF	(Brazil)	Kady Borges	Ferencváros	Undisclosed	

=== Out ===
Date	Position	Nationality	Name	To	Fee	Ref.
8 June 2024	DF	(Azerbaijan)	Nihad Guliyev	Sabail	Undisclosed	
9 July 2024	GK	(Georgia (country))	Luka Gugeshashvili	Panserraikos	Undisclosed	
15 January 2025	FW	(Brazil)	Juninho	Flamengo	Undisclosed	

=== Loans out ===
Date from	Position	Nationality	Name	To	Date to	Ref.
22 June 2023	MF	(Azerbaijan)	Ismayil Ibrahimli	Zira	End of season	
23 June 2023	FW	(Azerbaijan)	Rustam Akhmedzade	Zira	End of season	

=== Released ===
Date	Position	Nationality	Name	Joined	Date	Ref
2 June 2024	DF	(Azerbaijan)	Maksim Medvedev	Retirement		
3 June 2024	FW	(France)	Adama Diakhaby	Bandırmaspor	30 June 2024	
4 June 2024	GK	(Russia)	Andrey Lunyov	Dynamo Moscow	18 June 2024	
9 September 2024	FW	(France)	Hamidou Keyta	Konyaspor	10 September 2024	
4 January 2025	MF	(Brazil)	Júlio Romão	Ferencváros	5 February 2025	
11 February 2025	MF	(Azerbaijan)	Richard Almeida	Primavera		

== Friendlies ==
9 January 2025	Qarabağ	5–1	Kapaz	Baku
14:00 AZT (UTC+4)	Kashchuk; Addai; Mansumov	Report	Shahverdiyev	Stadium: Azersun Arena

12 January 2025	Qarabağ	4–2	Zira	Baku
AZT (UTC+4)	Kashchuk; Mənsumov; Mustafazade; Xhixha	Report	Renato; Júnior	Stadium: Azersun Arena

== Competitions ==
=== Overall record ===
Competition	First match	Last match	Starting round	Final position	Record							
Competition	First match	Last match	Starting round	Final position	Pld	W	D	L	GF	GA	GD	Win %
Premier League	2 August 2024	24 May 2025	Matchday 1	Winners	36	28	5	3	86	19	+67	77.78
Azerbaijan Cup	3 December 2024		Round of 16	Runnersup	6	4	0	2	11	5	+6	66.67
UEFA Champions League	23 July 2024	28 August 2024	Second qualifying round	Play-off round	6	3	0	3	15	9	+6	50.00
UEFA Europa League	26 September 2024	31 January 2025	League phase	36th	8	1	0	7	6	20	−14	12.50
Total					56	36	5	15	118	53	+65	64.29

Last updated: 31 May 2025
Source: Competitions

=== Premier League ===
==== League table ====
Pos	Team	Pld	W	D	L	GF	GA	GD	Pts	Qualification or relegation
1	Qarabağ (C)	36	28	5	3	86	19	+67	89	Qualification for the Champions League second qualifying round (Note: Since already qualified Paris Saint-Germain won the Champions League, Qarabağ was promoted to the Champions League second qualifying round as one of the two champions with the highest coefficient in Champions League qualifying.)
2	Zira	36	23	5	8	59	27	+32	74	Qualification for the Conference League second qualifying round
3	Araz-Naxçıvan	36	15	13	8	34	29	+5	58	Qualification for the Conference League second qualifying round
4	Turan Tovuz	36	14	13	9	45	39	+6	55	
5	Sabah	36	10	18	8	50	46	+4	48	Qualification for the Europa League first qualifying round (Note: Sabah qualified for the Europa League first qualifying round as the 2024–25 Azerbaijan Cup winners.)

Source: Soccerway
Rules for classification: 1) Points; 2) Matches won; 3) Goal difference; 4) Goals scored; 5) Head-to-head points; 6) Head-to-head goal difference; 7) Lower number of points based on yellow and red cards; 8) Draw.
(C) Champions

==== Results summary ====
Overall								Home						Away					
Pld	W	D	L	GF	GA	GD	Pts	W	D	L	GF	GA	GD	W	D	L	GF	GA	GD
36	28	5	3	86	19	+67	89	15	1	2	47	9	+38	13	4	1	39	10	+29

Source: 24 May 2025

==== Results by round ====
Round	1	2	4	5	6	7	8	9	10	11	12	13	14	15	16	17	3	18	19	20	21	22	23	24	25	26	27	28	29	30	31	32	33	34	35	36
Ground	A	H	H	A	H	H	H	A	A	H	A	H	A	A	A	H	A	H	H	H	A	H	A	H	A	A	A	A	H	A	H	A	H	H	H	A
Result	W	W	L	W	W	W	W	W	W	W	D	W	W	W	D	W	W	W	W	L	L	W	W	D	W	W	D	W	W	W	W	D	W	W	W	W
Position	1	1	1	2	2	1	1	1	1	1	1	1	1	1	1	1	1	1	1	1	1	1	1	1	1	1	1	1	1	1	1	1	1	1	1	1

Updated to match(es) played on 24 May 2025. Source:
A = Away; H = Home; W = Win; D = Draw; L = Loss

==== Matches ====
The league schedule was released on 19 July 2024.

2 August 2024 1	Araz-Naxçıvan	1–4	Qarabağ	Baku
20:00 AZT (UTC+4)	Rodrigues (yellow card) 74' (goal) 86'	Report	Xhixha 7'; Richard 9'; Keyta 47'; Cafarguliyev (yellow card) 51' (yellow-red card) 78'; Hüseynov 88'	Stadium: Dalga Arena; Attendance: 600; Referee: Elçin Məsiyev

9 August 2024 2	Qarabağ	3–0	Kapaz	Baku
20:00 AZT (UTC+4)	Richard 48'; Zoubir 72'; Juninho 84'	Report	Samadov (yellow card) 23'; Taghiyev (yellow card) 26' (yellow-red card) 78'; Khvalko (yellow card) 34'; Qirtimov (yellow card) 89'; Atakişiyev (yellow card) 89'	Stadium: Azersun Arena; Attendance: 2,000; Referee: Rauf Allahverdiyev

24 August 2024 4	Qarabağ	0–1	Turan Tovuz	Baku
18:15 AZT (UTC+4)	Benzia (yellow card) 19'; Richard (yellow card) 20'; Medina (yellow card) 89'	Report	Miller (yellow card) 5'; Serrano (yellow card) 15'; John 18' (pen.)	Stadium: Azersun Arena; Attendance: 2,000; Referee: Fərid Hacıyev

1 September 2024 5	Zira	1–3	Qarabağ	Zirə
20:45 AZT (UTC+4)	Nuriyev 40'; Akhmedzade (yellow card) 88'	Report	Bayramov 18'; Addai 33'; Zoubir 88'	Stadium: Zira Olympic Sport Complex Stadium; Attendance: 1,200; Referee: İnqilab Məmmədov

14 September 2024 6	Qarabağ	2–1	Sabail	Baku
19:00 AZT (UTC+4)	L.Andrade 5', 56'	Report	F.Nabiyev 58'	Stadium: Azersun Arena; Attendance: 1,600; Referee: Tural Qurbanov

20 September 2024 7	Qarabağ	4–0	Neftçi	Baku
20:00 AZT (UTC+4)	Bauer 18' (o.g.); Juninho 29'; Silva (yellow card) 44'; Benzia 45+2'; Romão (yellow card) 84'; L.Andrade 90+1'	Report		Stadium: Azersun Arena; Attendance: 3,000; Referee: Əliyar Ağayev

29 September 2024 8	Qarabağ	3–2	Sabah	Baku
16:00 AZT (UTC+4)	Bayramov 6'; Akhundzade 8' (yellow card) 42'; Medina 17'	Report	Nuriyev (yellow card) 41'; Mickels 45+1' (yellow card) 87'; Šafranko 51'	Stadium: Azersun Arena; Attendance: 1,500; Referee: İnqilab Məmmədov

6 October 2024 9	Sumgayit	0–1	Qarabağ	Sumgait
20:00 AZT (UTC+4)	Mossi (yellow card) 31'; Khachayev (yellow card) 88'; Rezabala (yellow card) 90+4'	Report	Janković (yellow card) 35'; Cafarguliyev 74'; Juninho (yellow card) 90+3'	Stadium: City Stadium; Attendance: 7,000; Referee: Elçin Məsiyev, Kamran Əliyev

18 October 2024 10	Kapaz	0–5	Qarabağ	Tovuz
18:00 AZT (UTC+4)		Report	Addai 17'; Romão (yellow card) 20'; Isayev 51'; L.Andrade 52'; Bayramov 67'; Kashchuk 78'	Stadium: City Stadium; Attendance: 1,500; Referee: Rəvan Həmzəzadə

27 October 2024 11	Qarabağ	3–0	Shamakhi	Baku
19:00 AZT (UTC+4)	Bayramov 50' (pen.); Romão (yellow card) 56'; Xhixha 66'; Benzia 84'; Isayev (yellow card) 87'	Report		Stadium: Republican Stadium; Attendance: 1,000; Referee: Cavid Cəlilov, Nicat İsmayıllı

1 November 2024 12	Turan Tovuz	0–0	Qarabağ	Tovuz
18:30 AZT (UTC+4)	Alex (yellow card) 76'	Report	P.Andrade (yellow card) 76'	Stadium: City Stadium; Attendance: 6,000; Referee: Əliyar Ağayev

10 November 2024 13	Qarabağ	4–0	Zira	Baku
19:00 AZT (UTC+4)	Silva 2'; Benzia 52' (pen.); Mustafazade 59'; Romão (yellow card) 61'; Kashchuk 68'	Report	Isayev (yellow card) 26'; Acka (yellow card) 85'	Stadium: Republican Stadium; Attendance: 900; Referee: Fərid Hacıyev

23 November 2024 14	Sabail	0–3	Qarabağ	Baku
17:00 AZT (UTC+4)	Ahmadov (yellow card) 6'; Y.Nabiyev (yellow card) 14'	Report	Hüseynov (yellow card) 17'; P.Andrade (yellow card) 29'; Juninho 47'; Mustafazade (yellow card) 59'; Medina (yellow card) 62'; Kashchuk 66'; L.Andrade 88'	Stadium: Bayil Arena; Attendance: 1,900; Referee: Nicat İsmayıllı

1 December 2024 15	Neftçi	0–3	Qarabağ	Baku
19:00 AZT (UTC+4)	Kuč (yellow card) 8'; Matias (yellow card) 74'	Report	L.Andrade 27', 55' (yellow card) 28'; Cafarguliyev (yellow card) 34'; Akhundzade 53'; Benzia (yellow card) 72'	Stadium: Neftçi Arena; Attendance: 7,069; Referee: Əliyar Ağayev

7 December 2024 16	Sabah	1–1	Qarabağ	Masazir
18:00 AZT (UTC+4)	Camalov (yellow card) 46'; Kupusović 49'; Thill (yellow card) 85'	Report	Romão (yellow card) 35'; Akhundzade 68'	Stadium: Bank Respublika Arena; Attendance: 3,000; Referee: Elçin Məsiyev

16 December 2024 17	Qarabağ	5–0	Sumgayit	Baku
19:00 AZT (UTC+4)	Qurbanlı 7', 33'; Akhundzade 45'; Xhixha 75'; Richard (yellow card) 90'; Bayramov 90+2'	Report	Dzhenetov (yellow card) 70'; Rezabala (yellow card) 90'; Khachayev (yellow card) 90+1'	Stadium: Republican Stadium; Attendance: 720; Referee: Tural Qurbanov

19 December 2024 3	Shamakhi	0–1	Qarabağ	Shamakhi
14:00 AZT (UTC+4)	Agjabayov (yellow card) 77'	Report	Romão (yellow card) 62'; Qurbanlı 90+4'; Akhundzade (yellow card) 90+4'	Stadium: City Stadium; Attendance: 1,200; Referee: Rəşad Əhmədov

22 December 2024 18	Qarabağ	2–0	Araz-Naxçıvan	Baku
16:30 AZT (UTC+4)	Akhundzade (yellow card) 35'; Benzia 41'; Zoubir 71'	Report		Stadium: Republican Stadium; Attendance: 1,100; Referee: Rəvan Həmzəzadə

17 January 2025 19	Qarabağ	3–2	Shamakhi	Baku
19:00 AZT (UTC+4)	Akhundzade 4'; Kashchuk 29'; Addai (yellow card) 56'; Hüseynov 72' (o.g.)	Report	Pusi 14'; Konaté 39'; Hüseynov (yellow card) 89'	Stadium: Republican Stadium; Attendance: 1,010; Referee: Elçin Məsiyev

26 January 2025 20	Qarabağ	1–2	Turan Tovuz	Baku
18:30 AZT (UTC+4)	Qurbanlı 7'; P.Andrade (yellow card) 74'; Janković (yellow card) 90+2'	Report	Sadykhov (yellow card) 38'; Kauan 90'; John 90+4'	Stadium: Republican Stadium; Attendance: 1,200; Referee: Cavid Cəlilov

2 February 2025 21	Zira	3–2	Qarabağ	Zirə
20:00 AZT (UTC+4)	Zebli (yellow card) 35'; Júnior (yellow card) 45+4'; Soumah 56', 67'; Volkovi 90'; Ibrahimli (yellow card) 90+3'	Report	Kashchuk 20'; P.Andrade 42' (yellow card) 77'; Bayramov (yellow card) 51'	Stadium: Zira Olympic Sport Complex Stadium; Attendance: 1,000; Referee: Rəvan Həmzəzadə

11 February 2025 22	Qarabağ	5–0	Sabail	Baku
19:00 AZT (UTC+4)	Janković (yellow card) 50'; Benzia 76' (pen.); L.Andrade 79', 85'; Kady 88'; Akhundzade 90+2'	Report		Stadium: Republican Stadium; Attendance: 400; Referee: Elçin Məsiyev

16 February 2025 23	Neftçi	0–1	Qarabağ	Baku
19:00 AZT (UTC+4)	Kuč (yellow card) 23'; Matias (yellow card) 90'	Report	Zoubir (yellow card) 14'; Medina (red card) 22'; Magomedaliyev (yellow card) 28'; Kady (yellow card) 76'; Janković 89' (pen.); Xhixha (yellow card) 90'	Stadium: Neftçi Arena; Attendance: 9,355; Referee: Rəvan Həmzəzadə

22 February 2025 24	Qarabağ	1–1	Sabah	Baku
19:00 AZT (UTC+4)	Zoubir 17'; Bayramov (yellow card) 38'	Report	Sekidika 35'; Lepinjica (yellow card) 54'; Chakla (yellow card) 64'	Stadium: Republican Stadium; Attendance: 500; Referee: Əliyar Ağayev

3 March 2025 25	Sumgayit	0–2	Qarabağ	Sumgait
19:30 AZT (UTC+4)		Report	Kady 31'; L.Andrade 38'	Stadium: City Stadium; Attendance: 1,500; Referee: Rauf Cabarov

8 March 2025 26	Araz-Naxçıvan	1–3	Qarabağ	Baku
19:00 AZT (UTC+4)	Benny (yellow card) 24'; Santos 35' (red card) 83'; Hasanalizade (yellow card) 83'; Jatobá (yellow card) 83'	Report	Akhundzade 44'; L.Andrade 77'; Benzia (yellow card) 83'; Janković (yellow card) 83'; Qurbanlı (yellow card) 83'; Addai 90+6'	Stadium: Liv Bona Dea Arena; Attendance: 300; Referee: Kamal Umudlu

15 March 2025 27	Kapaz	0–0	Qarabağ	Tovuz
17:00 AZT (UTC+4)	Buhagiar (yellow card) 83'; Jafarov (yellow card) 90+2'	Report	P.Andrade (yellow card) 48'	Stadium: City Stadium; Attendance: 1,500; Referee: Fərid Hacıyev

28 March 2025 28	Turan Tovuz	1–4	Qarabağ	Tovuz
18:30 AZT (UTC+4)	Souza 30'; Hajiyev (yellow card) 32'; Hackman (yellow card) 45+2'; Christian (yellow card) 58'; Ghaderi (yellow card) 80'	Report	Kady 16' (pen.), 84'; Akhundzade 32'; P.Andrade (yellow card) 35'; Kashchuk 90+2'	Stadium: City Stadium; Attendance: 6,500; Referee: Cavid Cəlilov

6 April 2025 29	Qarabağ	1–0	Zira	Baku
19:30 AZT (UTC+4)	Kady 15'; Janković (yellow card) 51'	Report	Djibrilla (yellow card) 14'; Hacılı (yellow card) 22'; Gomis (yellow card) 60'	Stadium: Republican Stadium; Attendance: 800; Referee: İnqilab Məmmədov

11 April 2025 30	Sabail	1–4	Qarabağ	Baku
19:00 AZT (UTC+4)	Gomis 72'	Report	Zoubir 17'; L.Andrade 19', 53', 65'	Stadium: Bayil Arena; Attendance: 1,200; Referee: Tural Qurbanov

19 April 2025 31	Qarabağ	3–0	Neftçi	Baku
20:00 AZT (UTC+4)	Kady (yellow card) 13'; Zoubir (yellow card) 22'; Benzia 40' (pen.); Akhundzade 41'	Report	Guzzo (yellow card) 44'; Ozobić (yellow card) 54'	Stadium: Republican Stadium; Attendance: 7,200; Referee: Elçin Məsiyev

27 April 2025 32	Sabah	1–1	Qarabağ	Masazir
20:00 AZT (UTC+4)	Irazabal (yellow card) 40'; Letić (yellow card) 59' (goal) 73'	Report	Xhixha 42' (pen.); Qurbanlı (yellow card) 46'; Isayev (yellow card) 64'; Hüseynov (yellow card) 84'	Stadium: Bank Respublika Arena; Attendance: 3,960; Referee: Tural Qurbanov

4 May 2025 33	Qarabağ	2–0	Sumgayit	Baku
18:00 AZT (UTC+4)	Benzia 59'; Janković (yellow card) 78'; Kady 82'	Report	Muradly (yellow card) 87'	Stadium: Azersun Arena; Attendance: 1,500; Referee: Cavid Cəlilov

11 May 2025 34	Qarabağ	2–0	Araz-Naxçıvan	Baku
20:00 AZT (UTC+4)	Vešović (yellow card) 29'; Qurbanlı 32'; Kashchuk (yellow card) 59'	Report	Ramon (yellow card) 5'; Ribeiro (yellow card) 18'; Wanderson (yellow card) 37'	Stadium: Azersun Arena; Attendance: 1,200; Referee: Əliyar Ağayev

18 May 2025 35	Qarabağ	3–0	Kapaz	Baku
19:00 AZT (UTC+4)	L.Andrade 31'; Qurbanlı (yellow card) 51' (goal) 81'; P.Andrade (yellow card) 59'; Kashchuk 75'	Report	A.Samadov (yellow card) 12'; Verdasca (yellow card) 34'; Pachu (yellow card) 50'	Stadium: Azersun Arena; Attendance: 3,500; Referee: Rəvan Həmzəzadə

24 May 2025 36	Shamakhi	0–1	Qarabağ	Shamakhi
17:00 AZT (UTC+4)	Valiyev (yellow card) 35'; Masimov (yellow card) 43'; Msanga (yellow card) 67'	Report	Kady (yellow card) 37'; Kashchuk (yellow card) 43'; Janković (yellow card) 67'; Addai 86'	Stadium: City Stadium; Attendance: 1,800; Referee: Rauf Cabarov

=== Azerbaijan Cup ===
4 December 2024 Last 16	Gabala	0–2	Qarabağ	Qabala
16:00 AZT (UTC+4)	Alasgarov (yellow card) 44'	Report	Zoubir 7'; Vešović (yellow card) 34'; Musayev 90+1' (o.g.)	Stadium: Gabala City Stadium; Attendance: 800; Referee: Rauf Jabarov

6 February 2025 Quarter-final 1st leg	Sabail	0–1	Qarabağ	Baku
18:30 AZT (UTC+4)	Çelik (yellow card) 8'	Report	Benzia 35'; Janković (yellow card) 88'; Guseynov (yellow card) 90+1'	Stadium: Bayil Arena; Attendance: 800; Referee: Rauf Cabarov

27 February 2025 Quarter-final 2nd leg	Qarabağ	3–1 (4–1 agg.)	Sabail	Baku
16:00 AZT (UTC+4)	Qurbanlı 13'; Rustamov 43' (o.g.); Akhundzade 55'	Report	Abdullazade 15'	Stadium: Tofiq Bahramov Republican Stadium; Attendance: Cavid Cəlilov; Referee: 546

2 April 2025 Semi-final 1st leg	Araz-Naxçıvan	1–0	Qarabağ	Baku
17:00 AZT (UTC+4)	Santos 28' (pen.); Wanderson (yellow card) 45+2'; Benny (yellow card) 58'; Abbasov (yellow card) 84'; Ribeiro (yellow card) 86'	Report	Vešović (yellow card) 36'; L.Andrade (yellow card) 76'; Kady (yellow card) 90+4'	Stadium: Liv Bona Dea Arena; Attendance: 600; Referee: Elçin Məsiyev

23 April 2025 Semi-final 2nd leg	Qarabağ	3–0 (3–1 agg.)	Araz-Naxçıvan	Baku
17:00 AZT (UTC+4)	Benzia (yellow card) 43' (goal) 65'; Akhundzade 70'; Bayramov 77' (pen.)	Report	Santos (yellow card) 90+3'	Stadium: Tofiq Bahramov Republican Stadium; Attendance: 1,300; Referee: Ravan Hamzazade

31 May 2025 Final	Qarabağ	2–3 (a.e.t.)	Sabah	Sumgait
19:00 AZT (UTC+4)	Bayramov (penalty missed) 42'; Kady 45+1' (yellow card) 100'; Irazabal 67' (o.g.); Benzia (yellow card) FT (red card) 120'; Mustafazade (yellow card) 120+1'	Report	Lepinjica (yellow card) 28'; Šafranko 36' (pen.) (penalty missed) 57' (yellow card) 109'; Mutallimov (yellow card) 90' (goal) 119'; Parris 90+7'; Ələsgərov (yellow card) 110'; Pokatilov (yellow card) 120+2'	Stadium: City Stadium; Attendance: 7,513; Referee: İnqilab Məmmədov

=== UEFA Champions League ===
==== Qualifying rounds ====
23 July 2024 Second qualifying round 1st leg	Lincoln Red Imps (Gibraltar)	0–2	(Azerbaijan) Qarabağ	Europa Point, Gibraltar
21:00 AZT (UTC+4)	Britto (yellow card) 72'; Torrilla (yellow card) 73'	Report	Juninho 45+2'; Bayramov 75'	Stadium: Europa Sports Park; Attendance: 724; Referee: István Vad (Hungary)
Note: Lincoln Red Imps played their home matches at Europa Sports Park, instead of the Victoria Stadium, due to renovation works.

30 July 2024 Second qualifying round 2nd leg	Qarabağ (Azerbaijan)	5–0 (7–0 agg.)	(Gibraltar) Lincoln Red Imps	Baku, Azerbaijan
20:00 AZT (UTC+4)	Juninho 17', 31', 44'; Benzia 66'; Leandro 72'	Report	Casciaro (yellow card) 77'	Stadium: Republican Stadium; Attendance: 23,700; Referee: Viktor Kopiievskyi (Ukraine)

6 August 2024 Third qualifying round 1st leg	Qarabağ (Azerbaijan)	1–2	(Bulgaria) Ludogorets Razgrad	Baku, Azerbaijan
20:00 AZT (UTC+4)	Romão (yellow card) 11'; Juninho (yellow card) 41' (goal) 65'	Report	Verdon (yellow card) 34'; Almeida 56'; Vidal (yellow card) 45+4' (yellow-red card) 89' (goal) 87'; Duarte (yellow card) 90+3'	Stadium: Republican Stadium; Attendance: 29,300; Referee: Urs Schnyder (Switzerland)

13 August 2024 Third qualifying round 2nd leg	Ludogorets Razgrad (Bulgaria)	2–7 (a.e.t.) (4–8 agg.)	(Azerbaijan) Qarabağ	Razgrad, Bulgaria
22:00 AZT (UTC+4)	Duah 13', 23' (pen.); Chochev (yellow card) 58'; Duarte (yellow card) 89'; Rick (yellow card) 90+3'; Nedyalkov (yellow card) 107'	Report	Juninho 7'; Mustafazade (yellow card) 28'; Benzia 45+1' (pen.), 118' (yellow card) 104'; P. Andrade 45+5', 112'; Silva (yellow card) 54'; Romão (yellow card) 85'; Zoubir (yellow card) 87'; Vešović (yellow card) 90'; Bayramov 93'; Xhixha 111'	Stadium: Huvepharma Arena; Attendance: 7,700; Referee: Simone Sozza (Italy)

20 August 2024 Play-off round 1st leg	Dinamo Zagreb (Croatia)	3–0	(Azerbaijan) Qarabağ	Zagreb, Croatia
23:00 AZT (UTC+4)	Pjaca 29'; Sučić (yellow card) 56'; Kulenović (yellow card) 69' (goal) 75', 80'	Report	Romão (yellow card) 62'	Stadium: Stadion Maksimir; Attendance: 14,073; Referee: Glenn Nyberg (Sweden)

28 August 2024 Play-off round 2nd leg	Qarabağ (Azerbaijan)	0–2 (0–5 agg.)	(Croatia) Dinamo Zagreb	Baku, Azerbaijan
20:45 AZT (UTC+4)	Medina (yellow card) 14' (yellow-red card) 88'; P.Andrade (yellow card) 69'	Report	Mmaee (yellow card) 18'; Ogiwara (yellow card) 30'; Pjaca 32'; Silva 53' (o.g.)	Stadium: Republican Stadium; Attendance: 29,800; Referee: Michael Oliver (England)

=== UEFA Europa League ===
==== League phase ====
Pos	Team	Pld	W	D	L	GF	GA	GD	Pts
32	(Latvian Football Federation) RFS	8	1	2	5	6	13	−7	5
33	(Bulgarian Football Union) Ludogorets Razgrad	8	0	4	4	4	11	−7	4
34	(Ukrainian Association of Football) Dynamo Kyiv	8	1	1	6	5	18	−13	4
35	(French Football Federation) Nice	8	0	3	5	7	16	−9	3
36	(Association of Football Federations of Azerbaijan) Qarabağ	8	1	0	7	6	20	−14	3

Source: UEFA
Rules for classification: League phase tiebreakers

Round	1	2	3	4	5	6	7	8
Ground	A	H	H	A	H	A	H	A
Result	L	L	L	W	L	L	L	L
Position	35	34	36	29	32	33	34	36

Updated to match(es) played on 31 January 2025. Source: Results
A = Away; H = Home; W = Win; D = Draw; L = Loss

26 September 2024 1	Tottenham Hotspur (England)	3–0	(Azerbaijan) Qarabağ	London, England
20:35 AZT (UTC+4)	Drăgușin (red card) 7'; Johnson 12'; Sarr 52'; Bissouma (yellow card) 56'; Solanke 68'	Report	Cafarguliyev (yellow card) 23'; Bayramov (penalty missed) 58'	Stadium: Tottenham Hotspur Stadium; Attendance: 51,757; Referee: Willy Delajod (France)
Note: The match was originally scheduled for 23:00 (20:00 UTC+1), but was delayed to 23:35 (20:35 UTC+1) due to late team arrival caused by heavy traffic.

3 October 2024 2	Qarabağ (Azerbaijan)	1–2	(Sweden) Malmö FF	Baku, Azerbaijan
20:45 AZT (UTC+4)	Juninho 15'	Report	Botheim 19', 47'; Bolin (yellow card) 71'; Friedrich (yellow card) 90'	Stadium: Republican Stadium; Attendance: 28,234; Referee: Anastasios Papapetrou (Greece)

24 October 2024 3	Qarabağ (Azerbaijan)	0–3	(Netherlands) Ajax	Baku, Azerbaijan
20:45 AZT (UTC+4)	Romão (red card) 15'; Cafarguliyev (yellow card) 16' (yellow-red card) 79'; Hüseynov (yellow card) 22'; Benzia (yellow card) 45+5'; Medina (yellow card) 73'; Janković (yellow card) 80'	Report	Taylor (yellow card) 20' (goal) 36'; Fitz-Jim (yellow card) 45+1'; Weghorst 74' (pen.); Akpom 77'	Stadium: Republican Stadium; Attendance: 27,520; Referee: Nick Walsh (Scotland)

7 November 2024 4	Bodø/Glimt (Norway)	1–2	(Azerbaijan) Qarabağ	Bodø, Norway
21:45 AZT (UTC+4)	Berg 41' (yellow card) 89'	Report	Bayramov 22'; Zoubir 69'; Medina (yellow card) 78'; Kochalski (yellow card) 85'	Stadium: Aspmyra Stadion; Attendance: 6,011; Referee: Luis Godinho (Portugal)

28 November 2024 5	Qarabağ (Azerbaijan)	1–4	(France) Lyon	Baku, Azerbaijan
21:45 AZT (UTC+4)	Juninho 88' (pen.)	Report	Mikautadze 15', 80'; Maitland-Niles (yellow card) 57'; Tolisso 63'; Fofana 68'; Tagliafico (yellow card) 90+3'	Stadium: Republican Stadium; Attendance: 22,563; Referee: Nenad Minaković (Serbia)

13 December 2024 6	IF Elfsborg (Sweden)	1–0	(Azerbaijan) Qarabağ	Borås, Sweden
00:00 AZT (UTC+4)	Qasem 57'; Kaib (yellow card) 86'	Report	Guseynov (yellow card) 60'; Juninho (yellow card) 79'; Janković (yellow card) 86'	Stadium: Borås Arena; Attendance: 6,278; Referee: António Nobre (Portugal)

23 January 2025 7	Qarabağ (Azerbaijan)	2–3	(Romania) FCSB	Baku, Azerbaijan
21:45 AZT (UTC+4)	L.Andrade 1'; Romão (yellow card) 39'; Dawa 41' (o.g.); P.Andrade (yellow card) 89'	Report	Alhassan (yellow card) 4'; Șut 7', 73'; Miculescu 45+4'; Ngezana (yellow card) 79'; Crețu (yellow card) 90+2'	Stadium: Republican Stadium; Attendance: 16,583; Referee: Filip Glova (Slovakia)

31 January 2025 8	Olympiacos (Greece)	3–0	(Azerbaijan) Qarabağ	Piraeus, Greece
00:00 AZT (UTC+4)	El Kaabi 56', 60'; Biancone 89'	Report	Medina (yellow card) 16'; Romão (yellow card) 41'; Zoubir (yellow card) 61'; Vešović (yellow card) 79'; Addai (yellow card) 83'; Qurbanlı (yellow card) 90+3'	Stadium: Karaiskakis Stadium; Attendance: 31,500; Referee: Radu Petrescu (Romania)

== Squad statistics ==
As of match played 31 May 2025

=== Appearances and goals ===
No.	Pos	Nat	Player	Total		Premier League		Azerbaijan Cup		Champions League		Europa League	
No.	Pos	Nat	Player	Apps	Goals	Apps	Goals	Apps	Goals	Apps	Goals	Apps	Goals
1	GK	(Azerbaijan) AZE	Shakhruddin Magomedaliyev	12	0	11	0	1	0	0	0	0	0
2	DF	(Brazil) BRA	Matheus Silva	46	1	26+3	1	5	0	2+4	0	4+2	0
7	MF	(Algeria) ALG	Yassine Benzia	50	12	17+15	7	5	2	6	3	6+1	0
8	MF	(Montenegro) MNE	Marko Janković	39	1	15+6	1	6	0	4	0	6+2	0
9	MF	(Brazil) BRA	Kady Borges	19	7	10+5	6	2+2	1	0	0	0	0
10	MF	(France) FRA	Abdellah Zoubir	49	8	18+12	6	4+1	1	6	0	8	1
11	FW	(Ghana) GHA	Emmanuel Addai	39	4	15+11	4	2+3	0	0	0	1+7	0
12	GK	(Azerbaijan) AZE	Sadig Mammadzade	1	0	1	0	0	0	0	0	0	0
13	DF	(Azerbaijan) AZE	Behlul Mustafazade	37	1	18+2	1	5	0	6	0	5+1	0
15	MF	(Cape Verde) CPV	Leandro Andrade	53	17	22+12	15	2+3	0	6	1	4+4	1
19	FW	(Albania) ALB	Redon Xhixha	21	5	9+8	4	0+2	0	0+2	1	0	0
21	MF	(Ukraine) UKR	Oleksiy Kashchuk	39	8	14+14	8	4+2	0	0	0	4+1	0
22	FW	(Azerbaijan) AZE	Musa Qurbanlı	31	7	11+13	6	2+3	1	0	0	0+2	0
24	MF	(Azerbaijan) AZE	Aleksey Isayev	34	1	20+7	1	2+2	0	0+2	0	0+1	0
26	Df	(Azerbaijan) AZE	Amin Rzayev	1	0	0+1	0	0	0	0	0	0	0
27	DF	(Azerbaijan) AZE	Toral Bayramov	52	9	24+9	5	4+1	1	3+3	2	3+5	1
29	DF	(Montenegro) MNE	Marko Vešović	31	0	7+10	0	3+2	0	4	0	2+3	0
30	DF	(Azerbaijan) AZE	Abbas Hüseynov	29	1	17+6	1	1	0	0+1	0	3+1	0
32	DF	(Azerbaijan) AZE	Hikmat Jabrayilzade	1	0	0+1	0	0	0	0	0	0	0
44	DF	(Azerbaijan) AZE	Elvin Cafarguliyev	43	1	17+9	1	4+2	0	3+1	0	6+1	0
55	DF	(Azerbaijan) AZE	Badavi Guseynov	28	0	17+3	0	0+2	0	0+1	0	4+1	0
66	MF	(Cape Verde) CPV	Patrick Andrade	39	3	16+7	1	2+3	0	2+2	2	4+3	0
81	DF	(Colombia) COL	Kevin Medina	31	1	17	1	1+1	0	6	0	6	0
90	FW	(Azerbaijan) AZE	Nariman Akhundzade	44	11	23+8	9	4+1	2	0+4	0	2+2	0
97	GK	(Croatia) CRO	Fabijan Buntić	15	0	7	0	1	0	5	0	2	0
99	GK	(Poland) POL	Mateusz Kochalski	28	0	17	0	4	0	1	0	6	0
Players away on loan:
Players who left Qarabağ during the season:
6	MF	(Brazil) BRA	Júlio Romão	28	0	11+4	0	0	0	6	0	6+1	0
17	FW	(France) FRA	Hamidou Keyta	7	1	0+3	1	0	0	0+4	0	0	0
18	FW	(Brazil) BRA	Juninho	26	11	7+6	3	1	0	6	6	6	2
20	MF	(Azerbaijan) AZE	Richard Almeida	8	2	5+2	2	1	0	0	0	0	0

=== Goal scorers ===
Place	Position	Nation	Number	Name	Premier League	Azerbaijan Cup	Champions League	Europa League	Total
1	MF	(Cape Verde)	15	Leandro Andrade	15	0	1	1	17
2	MF	(Algeria)	7	Yassine Benzia	7	2	3	0	12
3	FW	(Azerbaijan)	90	Nariman Akhundzade	9	2	0	0	11
3	FW	(Brazil)	18	Juninho	3	0	6	2	11
5	DF	(Azerbaijan)	27	Toral Bayramov	5	1	2	1	9
6	MF	(Ukraine)	21	Oleksiy Kashchuk	8	0	0	0	8
6	MF	(France)	10	Abdellah Zoubir	6	1	0	1	8
8	FW	(Azerbaijan)	22	Musa Qurbanlı	6	1	0	0	7
8	MF	(Brazil)	9	Kady Borges	6	1	0	0	7
10				Own goal	2	3	0	1	6
11	FW	(Albania)	19	Redon Xhixha	4	0	1	0	5
12	FW	(Ghana)	11	Emmanuel Addai	4	0	0	0	4
13	MF	(Cape Verde)	66	Patrick Andrade	1	0	2	0	3
14	MF	(Azerbaijan)	20	Richard Almeida	2	0	0	0	2
15	DF	(Brazil)	2	Matheus Silva	1	0	0	0	1
15	DF	(Azerbaijan)	13	Behlul Mustafazade	1	0	0	0	1
15	DF	(Azerbaijan)	30	Abbas Hüseynov	1	0	0	0	1
15	DF	(Azerbaijan)	44	Elvin Cafarguliyev	1	0	0	0	1
15	DF	(Colombia)	81	Kevin Medina	1	0	0	0	1
15	MF	(Azerbaijan)	24	Aleksey Isayev	1	0	0	0	1
15	FW	(France)	17	Hamidou Keyta	1	0	0	0	1
15	MF	(Montenegro)	8	Marko Janković	1	0	0	0	1
				TOTALS	86	11	15	6	118

=== Clean sheets ===
Place	Position	Nation	Number	Name	Premier League	Azerbaijan Cup	Champions League	Europa League	Total
1	GK	(Poland)	99	Mateusz Kochalski	11	2	0	0	13
2	GK	(Azerbaijan)	1	Shakhruddin Magomedaliyev	6	1	0	0	7
3	GK	(Croatia)	97	Fabijan Buntić	4	0	2	0	6
4	GK	(Azerbaijan)	12	Sadig Mammadzade	1	0	0	0	1
				TOTALS	22	3	2	0	27

=== Disciplinary record ===
Number	Nation	Position	Name	Premier League		Azerbaijan Cup		Champions League		Europa League		Total	
Number	Nation	Position	Name	Booked	Sent off (straight red)	Booked	Sent off (straight red)	Booked	Sent off (straight red)	Booked	Sent off (straight red)	Booked	Sent off (straight red)
1	(Azerbaijan)	GK	Shakhruddin Magomedaliyev	1	0	0	0	0	0	0	0	1	0
2	(Brazil)	DF	Matheus Silva	1	0	0	0	1	0	0	0	2	0
7	(Algeria)	MF	Yassine Benzia	3	0	2	1	1	0	1	0	7	1
8	(Montenegro)	MF	Marko Janković	7	0	1	0	0	0	2	0	10	0
9	(Brazil)	MF	Kady Borges	3	0	2	0	0	0	0	0	5	0
10	(France)	MF	Abdellah Zoubir	1	0	0	0	1	0	1	0	3	0
11	(Ghana)	FW	Emmanuel Addai	1	0	0	0	0	0	1	0	2	0
13	(Azerbaijan)	DF	Behlul Mustafazade	1	0	1	0	1	0	0	0	3	0
15	(Cape Verde)	MF	Leandro Andrade	1	0	1	0	0	0	0	0	2	0
19	(Albania)	FW	Redon Xhixha	1	0	0	0	0	0	0	0	1	0
21	(Ukraine)	MF	Oleksiy Kashchuk	1	0	0	0	0	0	0	0	1	0
22	(Azerbaijan)	FW	Musa Qurbanlı	3	0	0	0	0	0	1	0	4	0
24	(Azerbaijan)	MF	Aleksey Isayev	2	0	0	0	0	0	0	0	2	0
27	(Azerbaijan)	DF	Toral Bayramov	2	0	0	0	0	0	0	0	2	0
29	(Montenegro)	DF	Marko Vešović	1	0	2	0	1	0	1	0	5	0
30	(Azerbaijan)	DF	Abbas Hüseynov	2	0	0	0	0	0	1	0	3	0
44	(Azerbaijan)	DF	Elvin Cafarguliyev	3	1	0	0	0	0	3	1	6	2
55	(Azerbaijan)	DF	Badavi Guseynov	0	0	1	0	0	0	1	0	2	0
66	(Cape Verde)	MF	Patrick Andrade	7	0	0	0	1	0	1	0	9	0
81	(Colombia)	DF	Kevin Medina	2	1	0	0	2	1	3	0	7	2
90	(Azerbaijan)	FW	Nariman Akhundzade	1	0	0	0	0	0	0	0	1	0
99	(Poland)	GK	Mateusz Kochalski	0	0	0	0	0	0	1	0	1	0
Players away on loan:
Players who left Qarabağ during the season:
6	(Brazil)	MF	Júlio Romão	6	0	0	0	3	0	2	1	11	1
18	(Brazil)	FW	Juninho	1	0	0	0	1	0	1	0	3	0
20	(Azerbaijan)	MF	Richard Almeida	2	0	0	0	0	0	0	0	2	0
			TOTALS	53	2	10	1	12	1	20	2	95	6
