= 2023–24 Qarabağ FK season =

Qarabağ
2023–24 season
- President: Tahir Gözal
- Manager: Gurban Gurbanov
- Stadium: Azersun Arena
- Premier League: 1st (champions)
- Azerbaijan Cup: Winners
- UEFA Champions League: Second qualifying round
- UEFA Europa League: Round of 16
- Top goalscorer: League: Juninho (20); All: Juninho (31)
Home colours	Away colours	Third colours

The 2023–24 season was Qarabağ's 31st Azerbaijan Premier League season and their fifteenth season under manager Gurban Gurbanov. As well as the Azerbaijan Premier League, Qarabağ will also participate in the Azerbaijan Cup and the Champions League.

== Season overview ==
On 3 June, Qarabağ announced the signing of Hamidou Keyta from Zira on a contract three-year contract.

On 25 June, Qarabağ announced the signing of Juninho from Chaves on a contract three-year contract.

On 15 July, Qarabağ announced the return of Patrick Andrade, on a two-year contract with the option of a third, after a season playing for Partizan.

On 24 July, Qara Qarayev left the club after 15-years.

On 19 August, Qarabağ announced the signing of Andrey Lunyov to a one-year contract, with the option of an additional year, after he'd previously played for Bayer Leverkusen.

On 21 August, Qarabağ announced the signing of Matheus Silva to a two-year contract, with the option of an additional two years, from Lokomotiv Plovdiv.

On 24 September, Marko Vešović extended his contract with Qarabağ until the summer of 2027.

On 4 January, Qarabağ announced the signing of Aleksey Isayev from Sabah on a 3.5-year contract.

On 20 January, Rahil Mammadov left Qarabağ to sign for ŁKS Łódź.

On 2 February, Qarabağ announced that Leandro Andrade had extended his contract with the club until 30 June 2027.

On 2 June, before the Cup Final against Zira, Maksim Medvedev announced that he would retire from football following that match.

== Kits ==
Supplier: Adidas / Sponsor: Azersun

Home	Away	Away alt.	Third

Cup Home	Cup Away	Cup Third

Goalkeeper 1	Goalkeeper 2	Goalkeeper 3

== Squad ==
As of match played 2 June 2024

No.	Name	Nationality	Position	Date of birth (age)	Signed from	Signed in	Contract ends	Apps.	Goals
Goalkeepers
23	Luka Gugeshashvili	(Georgia (country))	GK	29 April 1999 (aged 25)	Jagiellonia Białystok	2022	2025	43	0
89	Amin Ramazanov	(Azerbaijan)	GK	20 January 2003 (aged 21)	Lokomotiv Moscow	2021		14	0
99	Andrey Lunyov	(Russia)	GK	13 November 1991 (aged 32)	Unattached	2023	2024 (+1)	34	0
Defenders
2	Matheus Silva	(Brazil)	DF	3 October 1997 (aged 26)	Lokomotiv Plovdiv	2023	2025 (+2)	41	2
5	Maksim Medvedev	(Azerbaijan)	DF	29 September 1989 (aged 34)	Youth team	2006		547+	17+
13	Bəhlul Mustafazadə	(Azerbaijan)	DF	27 February 1997 (aged 27)	Unattached	2021	2024	102	4
27	Toral Bayramov	(Azerbaijan)	DF	23 February 2001 (aged 23)	Academy	2019		156	19
29	Marko Vešović	(Montenegro)	DF	2 May 1996 (aged 28)	Legia Warsaw	2021	2027	104	5
30	Abbas Huseynov	(Azerbaijan)	DF	13 June 1995 (aged 28)	Inter Baku	2017		144	4
44	Elvin Cafarguliyev	(Azerbaijan)	DF	26 October 2000 (aged 23)	Youth team	2019		143	7
55	Badavi Huseynov	(Azerbaijan)	DF	11 July 1991 (aged 32)	Anzhi Makhachkala	2012		350	5
81	Kevin Medina	(Colombia)	DF	9 March 1993 (aged 31)	Chaves	2020	2023	131	3
83	Nihad Guliyev	(Azerbaijan)	DF	19 July 2001 (aged 22)	Youth team	2020		4	0
Midfielders
6	Júlio Romão	(Brazil)	MF	29 March 1998 (aged 26)	Santa Clara	2022	2026	92	2
7	Yassine Benzia	(Algeria)	MF	8 September 1994 (aged 29)	Dijon	2023	2025	54	16
8	Marko Janković	(Montenegro)	MF	9 July 1995 (aged 28)	Hapoel Tel Aviv	2022		87	7
10	Abdellah Zoubir	(France)	MF	5 December 1991 (aged 32)	RC Lens	2018		263	61
15	Leandro Andrade	(Cape Verde)	MF	24 September 1999 (aged 24)	Cherno More	2021	2027	109	27
20	Richard Almeida	(Azerbaijan)	MF	20 March 1989 (aged 35)	Zira	2021		370	60
24	Aleksey Isayev	(Azerbaijan)	MF	9 November 1995 (aged 28)	Sabah	2024	2027	22	0
66	Patrick Andrade	(Cape Verde)	MF	9 February 1993 (aged 31)	Partizan	2023	2025 (+1)	110	12
90	Nariman Akhundzade	(Azerbaijan)	MF	23 April 2004 (aged 20)	Youth team	2022		57	17
Forwards
11	Adama Diakhaby	(France)	FW	5 July 1996 (aged 27)	Unattached	2023	2025	32	7
17	Hamidou Keyta	(France)	FW	17 December 1994 (aged 29)	Zira	2023	2026	47	8
18	Juninho	(Brazil)	FW	21 November 1996 (aged 27)	Chaves	2023	2026	55	31
19	Redon Xhixha	(Albania)	FW	14 September 1998 (aged 25)	Tirana	2023	2026	52	9
Away on loan
	Ismayil Ibrahimli	(Azerbaijan)	MF	13 February 1998 (aged 25)	MOIK Baku	2018		107	7
	Rustam Akhmedzade	(Azerbaijan)	FW	25 December 2000 (aged 22)	Mynai	2021	2026	8	0
Left during the season
1	Shakhruddin Magomedaliyev	(Azerbaijan)	GK	12 June 1994 (aged 29)	Sumgayit	2015	2026	137	0
2	Qara Qarayev	(Azerbaijan)	MF	12 October 1992 (aged 31)	Youth team	2008		467	5
4	Rahil Mammadov	(Azerbaijan)	DF	24 November 1995 (aged 28)	Sabail	2018		80	2
	Gaspar Panadero	(Spain)	MF	9 December 1997 (aged 26)	Cádiz	2021	2024	4	0

=== Out on loan ===
Note: Flags indicate national team as defined under FIFA eligibility rules; some limited exceptions apply. Players may hold more than one non-FIFA nationality.

No. / Pos. / Nation / Player; — / MF / AZE / Ismayil Ibrahimli (at Zira)	No. / Pos. / Nation / Player; — / FW / AZE / Rustam Akhmedzade (at Zira)

== Transfers ==
=== In ===
Date	Position	Nationality	Name	From	Fee	Ref.
3 June 2023	FW	(France)	Hamidou Keyta	Zira	Free	
25 June 2023	FW	(Brazil)	Juninho	Chaves	Undisclosed	
15 July 2023	MF	(Cape Verde)	Patrick Andrade	Partizan	Undisclosed	
19 August 2023	GK	(Russia)	Andrey Lunyov	Unattached	Free	
21 August 2023	DF	(Brazil)	Matheus Silva	Lokomotiv Plovdiv	Undisclosed	
4 January 2024	MF	(Azerbaijan)	Aleksey Isayev	Sabah	Undisclosed	

=== Out ===
Date	Position	Nationality	Name	To	Fee	Ref.
23 June 2023	DF	(Azerbaijan)	Hajiagha Hajili	Zira	Undisclosed	
5 July 2023	DF	(Azerbaijan)	Zamig Aliyev	Kapaz	Undisclosed	
5 July 2023	FW	(Azerbaijan)	Musa Qurbanlı	Djurgarden	Undisclosed	
6 September 2023	GK	(Azerbaijan)	Shakhruddin Magomedaliyev	Adana Demirspor	Undisclosed	

=== Loans out ===
Date from	Position	Nationality	Name	To	Date to	Ref.
22 June 2023	MF	(Azerbaijan)	Ismayil Ibrahimli	Zira	End of season	
23 June 2023	FW	(Azerbaijan)	Rustam Akhmedzade	Zira	End of season	

=== Released ===
Date	Position	Nationality	Name	Joined	Date	Ref
24 July 2023	MF	(Azerbaijan)	Qara Qarayev	Neftçi	24 July 2023	
19 September 2023	MF	(Spain)	Gaspar Panadero	Linares Deportivo	18 January 2024	
20 January 2024	DF	(Azerbaijan)	Rahil Mammadov	ŁKS Łódź	20 January 2024	
2 June 2024	MF	(Azerbaijan)	Maksim Medvedev	Retirement		

== Friendlies ==
15 January 2024	Qarabağ	4–0	Zira	Baku
15:00 AZT (UTC+4)	L.Andrade; Richard; Xhixha; Akhundzade	Report		Stadium: Azersun Arena

== Competitions ==
=== Overview ===
Competition	First match	Last match	Starting round	Final position	Record							
Competition	First match	Last match	Starting round	Final position	Pld	W	D	L	GF	GA	GD	Win %
Premier League	5 August 2023	26 May 2024	Matchday 1	Winners	36	26	5	5	97	37	+60	72.22
Azerbaijan Cup	21 December 2023	2 June 2024	Round of 16	Winners	6	5	0	1	21	7	+14	83.33
UEFA Champions League	11 July 2023	2 August 2023	First qualifying round	Second qualifying round	4	2	1	1	9	5	+4	50.00
UEFA Europa League	10 August 2022	15 March 2024	Third qualifying round	Round of 16	14	7	3	4	24	22	+2	50.00
Total					60	40	9	11	151	71	+80	66.67

Last updated: 2 June 2024
Source: Competitions

=== Premier League ===
==== Results summary ====
Overall								Home						Away					
Pld	W	D	L	GF	GA	GD	Pts	W	D	L	GF	GA	GD	W	D	L	GF	GA	GD
36	26	5	5	97	37	+60	83	14	3	1	54	17	+37	12	2	4	43	20	+23

Last updated: 26 May 2024.
Source: See Results

==== Results by round ====
Round	1	2	3	4	5	6	7	8	9	10	11	12	13	14	15	16	17	18	19	20	21	22	23	24	25	26	27	28	29	30	31	32	33	34	35	36
Ground	H	H	H	H	A	H	A	H	A	A	A	H	A	A	H	A	H	A	H	A	A	H	H	A	A	H	A	A	H	A	H	A	H	A	H	A
Result	L	W	W	D	L	W	W	W	W	D	L	W	W	W	W	W	W	W	W	W	W	D	W	W	W	W	W	W	W	L	D	L	W	W	W	D
Position	6	4	3	3	5	2	2	2	2	2	2	2	2	1	1	1	1	1	1	1	1	1	1	1	1	1	1	1	1	1	1	1	1	1	1	1

Updated to match(es) played on 26 May 2024. Source: See Results
A = Away; H = Home; W = Win; D = Draw; L = Loss

==== Results ====
5 August 2023 1	Qarabağ	0–1	Zira	Baku
21:00 AZT (UTC+4)	Guseynov (yellow card) 47'; Mammadov (yellow card) 70'	Report	Chantakias 48' (yellow card) 87'; Zebli (yellow card) 81'	Stadium: Azersun Arena; Referee: Aliyar Ağayev

13 August 2023 2	Qarabağ	3–0	Turan Tovuz	Baku
18:30 AZT (UTC+4)	Juninho 30'; Mammadov (yellow card) 33'; Zoubir 66'; Diakhaby 69'; Romão (yellow card) 82'	Report	Miller (yellow card) 37'; Rzayev (yellow card) 90+3'	Stadium: Azersun Arena; Referee: Rauf Allahverdiyev

20 August 2023 3	Qarabağ	2–1	Araz-Naxçıvan	Baku
18:00 AZT (UTC+4)	Diakhaby 15'; Cafarguliyev (yellow card) 88'; Guliyev (yellow card) 90+1'; Zoubir 90+5'	Report	Manafov (yellow card) 29'; Kuzmanović 57'; Wanderson (yellow card) 59'; Kadiri (yellow card) 85'; Rzayev (yellow card) 88'	Stadium: Azersun Arena; Referee: Nicat İsmayıllı

27 August 2023 4	Qarabağ	1–1	Kapaz	Baku
20:45 AZT (UTC+4)	Juninho 9'; Janković (yellow card) 90+4'	Report	Ahmadov (yellow card) 66'; Karimov 90+4'	Stadium: Azersun Arena; Referee: Ali Aliyev

3 September 2023 5	Sabail	2–1	Qarabağ	Baku
19:30 AZT (UTC+4)	Ramalingom 17' (pen.), 42'; Nabiyev (yellow card) 51'; Ağayev (yellow card) 75'; Mehremić (yellow card) 84'	Report	Keyta 3'; Akhundzade (yellow card) 66'; Medina (yellow card) 85'; Gugeshashvili (yellow card) 90+8'	Stadium: Bayil Arena; Referee: Kamranbay Rahimov

17 September 2023 6	Qarabağ	2–0	Sabah	Baku
19:30 AZT (UTC+4)	Juninho 56'; Romão (yellow card) 62'; Keyta 88'	Report	Thill (yellow card) 64'; Camalov (yellow card) 79'; Margaritha (yellow card) 90+2'	Stadium: Tofiq Bahramov Republican Stadium; Referee: Tural Qurbanov

25 September 2023 7	Gabala	1–2	Qarabağ	Qabala
19:00 AZT (UTC+4)	Keyta 2'; Akhundzade 11'; Medina (red card) 42'; Bayramov (yellow card) 60'	Report	Qirtimov (yellow card) 31'; Allach (yellow card) 42'; Hani (yellow card) 49'; Azizli (yellow card) 52'; Ochihava (yellow card) 52'; Áfrico 76'	Stadium: City Stadium; Referee: Elcin Masiyev

29 September 2023 8	Qarabağ	5–0	Sumgayit	Baku
20:00 AZT (UTC+4)	Juninho 22', 27'; Bayramov 42' (pen.); L.Andrade 44'; Zoubir 50'; P.Andrade (yellow card) 56'	Report	Dosso (yellow card) 12'	Stadium: Azersun Arena; Referee: Aliyar Ağayev

8 October 2023 9	Neftçi	0–2	Qarabağ	Baku
19:30 AZT (UTC+4)	Mahmudov (yellow card) 45+1'; Valdez (yellow card) 68'; Melano (yellow card) 82'	Report	Juninho 47'; Romão (yellow card) 68'; Medvedev (yellow card) 72'; P.Andrade (yellow card) 78'; Xhixha 87'	Stadium: Neftçi Arena; Referee: Rashad Ahmadov

20 October 2023 10	Turan Tovuz	2–2	Qarabağ	Tovuz
18:30 AZT (UTC+4)	Hajiyev (yellow card) 14'; Miller (yellow card) 29'; John 46'; Pachu (yellow card) 56'; Guseynov 90+4', (yellow card) 90+5'; Najafov (yellow card) 90+5'	Report	Juninho 7'; Romão (yellow card) 44'; L.Andrade 90'; Bayramov (yellow card) 90+1'	Stadium: City Stadium; Referee: Farid Hajiyev

30 October 2023 11	Araz-Naxçıvan	2–1	Qarabağ	Baku
19:00 AZT (UTC+4)	Wanderson (yellow card) 17'; O.Aliyev (yellow card) 31' (goal) 75' (pen.); Azzaoui (yellow card) 78'; Ngando (yellow card) 86'; Avram (yellow card) 88'; Mashike 90+1'	Report	Gugeshashvili (yellow card) 59'; Janković (yellow card) 76'; Benzia (yellow card) 78'; Zoubir (yellow card) 90+4'; Juninho 90+7'; Richard (yellow card) 90+7'	Stadium: Tofiq Bahramov Republican Stadium; Referee: Aliyar Ağayev

4 November 2023 12	Qarabağ	7–1	Kapaz	Baku
15:00 AZT (UTC+4)	Benzia 2', 16', 43'; L.Andrade 13', 52'; Mustafazadə (yellow card) 26'; Juninho 37'; Akhundzade 63'	Report	Niane 18' (yellow card) 76'	Stadium: Tofiq Bahramov Republican Stadium; Referee: Emin Aliyev

12 November 2023 13	Qarabağ	3–1	Sabail	Baku
AZT (UTC+4)	Bayramov 8'; Benzia 43'; Juninho 54'	Report	Mehremić (yellow card) 45+1'; Nuno 77'	Stadium: Tofiq Bahramov Republican Stadium; Referee: Ravan Hamzazada

24 November 2023 14	Sabah	1–2	Qarabağ	Masazır
20:00 AZT (UTC+4)	Letić (yellow card) 55'; Sekidika 64'; Guliyev (yellow card) 82'; Seydiyev (yellow card) 85'	Report	Romão (yellow card) 13'; Janković (yellow card) 48'; Bayramov 58' (pen.); Akhundzade 61'	Stadium: Bank Respublika Arena; Referee: Ingilab Mammadov

4 December 2023 15	Qarabağ	3–0	Gabala	Baku
19:30 AZT (UTC+4)	Keyta 8'; Romão (yellow card) 61'; Akhundzade 64'; Juninho 90+2'	Report	Hani (yellow card) 58'	Stadium: Tofiq Bahramov Republican Stadium; Referee: Tural Qurbanov

8 December 2023 16	Sumgayit	1–6	Qarabağ	Sumgait
19:30 AZT (UTC+4)	Sorga 43'; Dosso (yellow card) 83'	Report	L.Andrade 21', 73'; Juninho 29'; Zoubir 34'; Benzia 58'; Keyta 86'	Stadium: Kapital Bank Arena; Referee: Farid Hajiyev

18 December 2023 17	Qarabağ	2–0	Neftçi	Baku
20:00 AZT (UTC+4)	Benzia 71'; Keyta 90+2'	Report		Stadium: Tofiq Bahramov Republican Stadium; Referee: Ravan Hamzazada

24 December 2023 18	Zira	0–1	Qarabağ	Zirə
18:30 AZT (UTC+4)	Isayev (yellow card) 13'; Kuliyev (yellow card) 38'	Report	Romão (yellow card) 26'; Juninho 30'; L.Andrade (yellow card) 35'; P.Andrade (yellow card) 36'; Cafarguliyev (yellow card) 55'; Benzia (yellow card) 85'	Stadium: Zira Olympic Sport Complex Stadium; Referee: Javid Jalilov

23 January 2024 19	Qarabağ	3–1	Araz-Naxçıvan	Baku
19:00 AZT (UTC+4)	Kurdić 6' (o.g.); Zoubir 22', 61'; Romão (yellow card) 68'	Report	Kuzmanović (yellow card) 27'; Kadiri 71'; Rzayev (yellow card) 74'	Stadium: Tofiq Bahramov Republican Stadium; Referee: Rauf Allahverdiyev

27 January 2024 20	Kapaz	1–2	Qarabağ	Ganja
15:00 AZT (UTC+4)	Khvalko (yellow card) 14'; Taghiyev (yellow card) 32'; Onanuga 72'; Rodrigues (yellow card) 83'; Kvirkvia (yellow card) 90'; Niane (yellow card) 90+7'	Report	Keyta (yellow card) 48'; Xhixha (yellow card) 53'; Cafarguliyev (yellow card) 71'; Juninho 80'; Bayramov 90+5' (pen.)	Stadium: City Stadium; Referee: Nicat İsmayıllı

3 February 2024 21	Sabail	1–2	Qarabağ	Baku
15:00 AZT (UTC+4)	Nuno 67' (pen.); Najah (yellow card) 69'; Nabiyev (yellow card) 90+7'	Report	Bayramov 14' (pen.); L.Andrade (yellow card) 35'; Romão (yellow card) 45+2'; Medvedev (yellow card) 53' (yellow-red card) 66'; Benzia 59' (pen.); Vešović (yellow card) 77'; Lunyov (yellow card) 90+7'	Stadium: Bayil Arena; Referee: Javid Jalilov

11 February 2024 22	Qarabağ	3–3	Sabah	Baku
19:00 AZT (UTC+4)	Janković 31'; Juninho 64' (pen.); Benzia 90+8'	Report	Parris (yellow card) 16'; Nuriyev (yellow card) 37'; Belfodil 45+1' (pen.), 54' (pen.); Mutallimov 90+5'	Stadium: Tofiq Bahramov Republican Stadium; Referee: Ravan Hamzazada

25 February 2024 24	Qarabağ	2–0	Sumgayit	Baku
19:00 AZT (UTC+4)	Diakhaby 52'; Benzia 83'	Report	Badalov (yellow card) 77'; Dosso (yellow card) 90+3'	Stadium: Tofiq Bahramov Republican Stadium; Referee: Nicat İsmayıllı

28 February 2024 23	Gabala	0–4	Qarabağ	Qabala
19:00 AZT (UTC+4)	Akel (red card) 53'	Report	Romão (yellow card) 33'; Diakhaby 48'; Richard 59' (pen.); Akhundzade 65'; Medvedev (yellow card) 78'; Janković 81'	Stadium: City Stadium; Referee: Tural Qurbanov

3 March 2024 25	Neftçi	1–4	Qarabağ	Baku
19:00 AZT (UTC+4)	Salahlı (yellow card) 33'; Ozobić (yellow card) 36' (goal) 71' (pen.); Jafarov (yellow card) 58'; Matias (yellow card) 88'	Report	Janković (yellow card) 5'; Akhundzade 47'; Bayramov 60' (pen.), 90+3'; L.Andrade 90+7'	Stadium: Neftçi Arena; Referee: Elcin Məsiyev

10 March 2024 26	Qarabağ	3–1	Zira	Baku
18:00 AZT (UTC+4)	Cafarguliyev (yellow card) 28'; Akhundzade 43'; Richard 76' (pen.); Diakhaby 81'	Report	Nuriyev (yellow card) 72'; Colli 79'	Stadium: Tofiq Bahramov Republican Stadium; Referee: Aliyar Ağayev

17 March 2024 27	Turan Tovuz	1–3	Qarabağ	Tovuz
16:00 AZT (UTC+4)	John 9' (pen.); Yusifli (yellow card) 13'; Alkhasov (yellow card) 38'	Report	P.Andrade (yellow card) 15' (goal) 73'; Akhundzade 56'; Gugeshashvili (yellow card) 64'; Bayramov 90+5' (pen.)	Stadium: City Stadium; Referee: Tural Qurbanov

29 March 2024 28	Kapaz	1–6	Qarabağ	Ganja
19:00 AZT (UTC+4)	Seyidov (yellow card) 43'; Fall 90'	Report	Romão 21'; Isayev (yellow card) 44'; Juninho 52', 56'; A.Hüseynov 64'; Cafarguliyev 69'; Bayramov (yellow card) 86'; Xhixha 88'	Stadium: City Stadium; Referee: Rauf Jabarov

6 April 2024 29	Qarabağ	4–1	Sabail	Baku
20:00 AZT (UTC+4)	Benzia 15', 40'; Bayramov (yellow card) 45+1' (goal) 69' (pen.); Medina (yellow card) 48'; Silva (yellow card) 81'; Akhundzade 90'	Report	Bardea 7' (yellow card) 37'; Queta (yellow card) 28'; Mehremić (yellow card) 44'; Abdullazade (yellow card) 46' (goal) 88'; Nuno (yellow card) 53'; Lugasi (yellow card) 76'	Stadium: Tofiq Bahramov Republican Stadium; Referee: Nicat İsmayıllı

14 April 2024 30	Sabah	3–2	Qarabağ	Masazır
19:00 AZT (UTC+4)	Seydiyev 16'; Sekidika 38'; Camalov (yellow card) 40'; Mutallimov 56'; Nuriyev (yellow card) 71'; Hadhoudi (yellow card) 77'; Irazabal (yellow card) 79'; Christian (yellow card) 88'	Report	L.Andrade 7'; Guseynov (yellow card) 57'; Akhundzade 76'	Stadium: Bank Respublika Arena; Referee: Ravan Hamzazada

20 April 2024 31	Qarabağ	2–2	Gabala	Baku
16:30 AZT (UTC+4)	Medina (yellow card) 35'; Benzia 66'; Zoubir 71'; Hüseynov (yellow card) 88'	Report	Aouacheria 19'; Ochihava (yellow card) 61'; Akakpo 85'	Stadium: Tofiq Bahramov Republican Stadium; Referee: Farid Haciyev

28 April 2024 32	Sumgayit	1–0	Qarabağ	Sumgait
20:00 AZT (UTC+4)	Kahat 70'; Badalov (yellow card) 89'; Suliman (yellow card) 90'	Report	Medina (yellow card) 39'; Isayev (yellow card) 80'; Benzia (yellow card) 90+5'	Stadium: Kapital Bank Arena; Referee: Rauf Jabarov

4 May 2024 33	Qarabağ	5–0	Neftçi	Baku
19:30 AZT (UTC+4)	Akhundzade 13', 77'; Janković (yellow card) 40'; Bayramov 41'; Romão (yellow card) 45+3'; L.Andrade 65'; Zoubir 85'	Report	Moreno (yellow card) 34'; Valdez (yellow card) 62'; Matias (red card) 78'; Salahlı (yellow card) 89'	Stadium: Tofiq Bahramov Republican Stadium; Referee: Ingilab Məmmədov

11 May 2024 34	Zira	0–1	Qarabağ	Zirə
19:30 AZT (UTC+4)	Kulach (yellow card) 42'; Ruan (yellow card) 90+2'	Report	Cafarguliyev (yellow card) 15'; Juninho 34' (pen.); Janković (yellow card) 38'; P.Andrade (yellow card) 63'; Diakhaby (yellow card) 78'	Stadium: Zira Olympic Sport Complex Stadium; Referee: Aliyar Ağayev

17 May 2024 35	Qarabağ	4–3	Turan Tovuz	Baku
20:30 AZT (UTC+4)	L.Andrade 19'; L.Andrade 69', 90'; Silva 75'	Report	Hackman 48', 86'; Pachu 53'; Rzayev (yellow card) 55'	Stadium: Tofiq Bahramov Republican Stadium; Referee: Javid Jalilov

26 May 2024 36	Araz-Naxçıvan	2–2	Qarabağ	Baku
19:30 AZT (UTC+4)	Mashike 3'; Rzayev 59'	Report	Juninho 28'; Abdullayev 32' (o.g.)	Stadium: Azersun Arena; Referee: Akbar Ahmadov

==== League table ====
Pos	Team	Pld	W	D	L	GF	GA	GD	Pts	Qualification or relegation
1	Qarabağ (C)	36	26	5	5	97	37	+60	83	Qualification for the Champions League second qualifying round (Note: Since already qualified Real Madrid won the Champions League, Qarabağ was promoted to the Champions League second qualifying round as one of the two champions with the highest coefficient in Champions League qualifying.)
2	Zira	36	16	10	10	33	22	+11	58 (Note: Zira are ahead of Sabah on head-to-head points: Zira 1–0 Sabah, Sabah 0–1 Zira, Zira 0–1 Sabah, Sabah 0–1 Zira)	Qualification for the Europa League first qualifying round (Note: The 2023–24 Azerbaijan Cup winners qualified for the Europa League first qualifying round. Since the cup winners (Qarabağ) qualified based on league position, the Europa League spot was passed to the second-placed team, and the second Conference League second round spot was passed to the fourth-placed team.)
3	Sabah	36	17	7	12	50	40	+10	58	Qualification for the Conference League second qualifying round
4	Sumgayit	36	15	12	9	37	38	−1	57	Qualification for the Conference League second qualifying round
5	Neftçi	36	16	8	12	51	40	+11	56	

Source: Soccerway
Rules for classification: 1) Points; 2) Head-to-head points; 3) Head-to-head goal difference; 4) Head-to-head goals scored; 5) Head-to-head away goals scored (only if two teams); 6) Goal difference; 7) Goals scored.
(C) Champions

=== Azerbaijan Cup ===
21 December 2023 Last 16	Qarabağ	1–0	MOIK Baku	Khankendi
14:00 AZT (UTC+4)	Akhundzade 90+5'	Report	Ahmadzadeh (yellow card) 82'	Stadium: Khankendi Stadium; Attendance: 4,590; Referee: Ali Aliyev

30 January 2024 Quarterfinal 1st leg	Sabah	1–7	Qarabağ	Masazır
19:00 AZT (UTC+4)	Volkovi (yellow card) 49'; Sekidika 63'	Report	Guseynov (yellow card) 12'; Keyta 21'; Juninho 28', 55'; Akhundzade 45+3'; Zoubir 77', 90+3'; Diakhaby 88'	Stadium: Bank Respublika Arena; Attendance: 1,575; Referee: Elçin Məsiyev

8 February 2024 Quarterfinal 2nd leg	Qarabağ	3–4 (10–5 agg.)	Sabah	Baku
20:00 AZT (UTC+4)	Keyta 30'; Silva (yellow card) 38'; Diakhaby 62'; Hadhoudi 74' (o.g.); Richard (red card) 77'	Report	Christian 5'; Margaritha 27'; Letić (yellow card) 37'; Belfodil 58', 69' (pen.)	Stadium: Tofiq Bahramov Republican Stadium; Attendance: 750; Referee: Rauf Allahverdiyev

2 April 2024 Semifinal 1st leg	Neftçi	0–4	Qarabağ	Baku
20:00 AZT (UTC+4)	Matias (yellow card) 13'; Valdez (yellow card) 31'; Mahmudov (yellow card) 64'; Eddy (yellow card) 65'	Report	Bayramov 14' (pen.), 29'; Romão (yellow card) 15'; Janković 38'; Benzia (yellow card) 65'; Akhundzade 86'	Stadium: Neftçi Arena; Attendance: 5,750; Referee: Ravan Hamzazade

24 April 2024 Semifinal 2nd leg	Qarabağ	4–1 (8–1 agg.)	Neftçi	Baku
20:00 AZT (UTC+4)	Juninho 16', 69'; Benzia (yellow card) 54'; Qarayev 62' (o.g.); Akhundzade 78'	Report	Conteh (yellow card) 42'; Mirzov 64'; Brkić (yellow card) 70'; Matias (yellow card) 74'	Stadium: Tofiq Bahramov Republican Stadium; Attendance: 3,000; Referee: Aliyar Agayev

2 June 2024 Final	Qarabağ	2–1	Zira	Baku
20:00 AZT (UTC+4)	Juninho 42' (yellow card) 85'; Zoubir 62'; Keyta (yellow card) 90+5'	Report	Ibrahimli 58'; Sadykhov (yellow card) 59'; Ruan (yellow card) 76'	Stadium: Dalga Arena; Attendance: 3,000; Referee: Ravan Hamzazada

=== UEFA Champions League ===
==== Qualifying rounds ====
11 July 2023 First qualifying round 1st leg	Lincoln Red Imps (Gibraltar)	1–2	(Azerbaijan) Qarabağ	Gibraltar
19:30 AZT (UTC+4)	Gómez 25'; Yahaya (yellow card) 45+4'; Casciaro (yellow card) 72'; Lopes (yellow card) 78'	Report	Xhixha 58'; Benzia 90+4'	Stadium: Victoria Stadium; Attendance: 683; Referee: Vitālijs Spasjoņņikovs (Latvia)

19 July 2023 First qualifying round 2nd leg	Qarabağ (Azerbaijan)	4–0 (6–1 agg.)	(Gibraltar) Lincoln Red Imps	Baku, Azerbaijan
20:00 AZT (UTC+4)	Zoubir 7'; Mustafazadə 45+1'; Xhixha 49'; Janković 62'	Report	Sergeant (yellow card) 44'; Gómez (yellow card) 64'	Stadium: Baku Olympic Stadium; Attendance: 19,453; Referee: Eldorjan Hamiti (Albania)

26 July 2023 Second qualifying round 1st leg	Raków Częstochowa (Poland)	3–2	(Azerbaijan) Qarabağ	Częstochowa, Poland
23:15 AZT (UTC+4)	Cebula (yellow card) 11'; Cafarguliyev 55' (o.g.); Piasecki 71'; Kittel 90+1'	Report	Benzia (yellow card) 35'; Xhixha 73', 75' (yellow card) 78'; Richard (yellow card) 90+8'	Stadium: Miejski Stadion Piłkarski "Raków"; Attendance: 5,451; Referee: Lukas Fähndrich (Switzerland)

2 August 2023 Second qualifying round 2nd leg	Qarabağ (Azerbaijan)	1–1 (3–4 agg.)	(Poland) Raków Częstochowa	Baku, Azerbaijan
20:00 AZT (UTC+4)	Medina (yellow card) 47'; Xhixha 60'; Medvedev (yellow card) 89'; Janković (yellow card) 90+6'	Report	Tudor 52'; Jean Carlos (yellow card) 56'; Kovačević (yellow card) 90+2'	Stadium: Baku Olympic Stadium; Attendance: 31,257; Referee: Sven Jablonski (Germany)

=== UEFA Europa League ===
==== Qualifying rounds ====
10 August 2023 Third qualifying round 1st leg	Qarabağ (Azerbaijan)	2–1	(Finland) HJK	Baku, Azerbaijan
20:00 AZT (UTC+4)	L.Andrade 55'; Juninho 85'	Report	Radulović (yellow card) 30'; Olusanya 77'	Stadium: Tofiq Bahramov Republican Stadium; Attendance: 24,984; Referee: Roi Reinshreiber (Israel)

17 August 2023 Third qualifying round 2nd leg	HJK (Finland)	1–2 (2–4 agg.)	(Azerbaijan) Qarabağ	Helsinki, Finland
20:00 AZT (UTC+4)	Hostikka 10'; Kouassivi-Benissan (yellow card) 14' (yellow-red card) 16'; Keskinen (yellow card) 45+6'; Hetemaj (yellow card) 75'	Report	Bayramov 45+3' (pen.); Benzia 56'; Magomedaliyev (yellow card) 83'; Romão (yellow card) 85'	Stadium: Bolt Arena; Attendance: 7,612; Referee: Willy Delajod (France)

24 August 2023 Playoff round 1st leg	Olimpija Ljubljana (Slovenia)	0–2	(Azerbaijan) Qarabağ	Ljubljana, Slovenia
22:00 AZT (UTC+4)	Doffo (yellow card) 23'; Elšnik (yellow card) 45+2'; Sualehe (yellow card) 55' (yellow-red card) 90+5'; Sešlar (yellow card) 59'	Report	Romão (yellow card) 29'; Medina 32'; L.Andrade 44'; Gugeshashvili (yellow card) 73'	Stadium: Stožice Stadium; Attendance: 6,123; Referee: Georgi Kabakov (Bulgaria)

31 August 2023 Playoff round 2nd leg	Qarabağ (Azerbaijan)	1–1 (3–1 agg.)	(Slovenia) Olimpija Ljubljana	Baku, Azerbaijan
20:00 AZT (UTC+4)	Bayramov 24' (pen.); Mustafazadə (yellow card) 29'; Janković (yellow card) 45+3'; Zoubir (yellow card) 63'; L.Andrade (yellow card) 90+1'	Report	Motika (yellow card) 28'; Pinto 36'; Rui Pedro (yellow card) 42'; Doffo (yellow card) 45+1'; Lasickas (yellow card) 82'; Bristrić (yellow card) 90+1'	Stadium: Tofiq Bahramov Republican Stadium; Attendance: 27,354; Referee: Alejandro Hernández Hernández (Spain)

==== Group stage ====
Pos	Team	Pld	W	D	L	GF	GA	GD	Pts	Qualification
1	(Germany) Bayer Leverkusen	6	6	0	0	19	3	+16	18	Advance to round of 16
2	(Azerbaijan) Qarabağ	6	3	1	2	7	9	−2	10	Advance to knockout round play-offs
3	(Norway) Molde	6	2	1	3	12	12	0	7	Transfer to Europa Conference League
4	(Sweden) BK Häcken	6	0	0	6	3	17	−14	0	

Source: UEFA
Rules for classification: Group stage tiebreakers

21 September 2023 1	Qarabağ (Azerbaijan)	1–0	(Norway) Molde	Baku, Azerbaijan
20:45 AZT (UTC+4)	L.Andrade 56'; Janković (yellow card) 84'; Medina (yellow card) 87'; Romão (yellow card) 90+1'	Report	Breivik (yellow card) 20'; Ellingsen (yellow card) 34'; Kaasa (yellow card) 47'; Eriksen (yellow card) 90+7'	Stadium: Tofiq Bahramov Republican Stadium; Attendance: 26,500; Referee: John Beaton (Scotland)

5 October 2023 2	BK Häcken (Sweden)	0–1	(Azerbaijan) Qarabağ	Gothenburg, Sweden
23:00 AZT (UTC+4)	Sa.Gustafson (yellow card) 89'	Report	Janković (yellow card) 29'; Juninho 70'; P.Andrade (yellow card) 84'	Stadium: Ullevi; Attendance: 8,124; Referee: Sebastian Gishamer (Austria)
Note: BK Häcken played their home matches at the Ullevi, in Gothenburg, instead of their regular stadium, the Bravida Arena, in Gothenburg, which did not meet UEFA requirements.

26 October 2023 3	Bayer Leverkusen (Germany)	5–1	(Azerbaijan) Qarabağ	Leverkusen, Germany
23:00 AZT (UTC+4)	Wirtz 6' (yellow card) 15'; Grimaldo 29', 55'; Boniface 36'; Andrich (yellow card) 43'; Tapsoba 57'	Report	Bayramov 16' (pen.); L.Andrade (yellow card) 19'; Romão (yellow card) 45+1'; Cafarguliyev (yellow card) 77'	Stadium: BayArena; Attendance: 29,039; Referee: Horațiu Feșnic (Romania)

9 November 2023 4	Qarabağ (Azerbaijan)	0–1	(Germany) Bayer Leverkusen	Baku, Azerbaijan
21:45 AZT (UTC+4)	Medina (yellow card) 25'; Vešović (yellow card) 35'; Romão (yellow card) 69'; Gugeshashvili (yellow card) 90+3'; Bayramov (yellow card) 90+7'	Report	Wirtz (yellow card) 68'; Xhaka (yellow card) 69'; Boniface 90+4' (pen.)	Stadium: Tofiq Bahramov Republican Stadium; Attendance: 30,055; Referee: Craig Pawson (England)

1 December 2023 5	Molde (Norway)	2–2	(Azerbaijan) Qarabağ	Molde, Norway
00:00 AZT (UTC+4)	Grødem (yellow card) 36'; Løvik (yellow card) 43'; Eikrem (yellow card) 61'; Eriksen 82', 87'	Report	Juninho 12'; P.Andrade (yellow card) 66'; Medina (yellow card) 76'; Mustafazadə 90+5'; Xhixha (yellow card) 90+7'	Stadium: Aker Stadion; Attendance: 5,291; Referee: Erik Lambrechts (Belgium)

14 December 2023 6	Qarabağ (Azerbaijan)	2–1	(Sweden) BK Häcken	Baku, Azerbaijan
21:45 AZT (UTC+4)	Andrade 1'; Benzia 45+4'; Vešović (red card) 56'	Report	Hovland (yellow card) 22'; Sonko (yellow card) 67'; Guseynov 90+4' (o.g.)	Stadium: Tofiq Bahramov Republican Stadium; Attendance: 28,515; Referee: Juxhin Xhaja (Albania)

==== Knockout phase ====
16 February 2024 Knockout round play-offs 1st leg	Braga (Portugal)	2–4	(Azerbaijan) Qarabağ	Braga, Portugal
00:00 AZT (UTC+4)	Banza 44'; Ruiz (yellow card) 45+2'; Moutinho 90+1' (pen.)	Report	Janković 21' (pen.); Silva (yellow card) 30'; Zoubir 54', 69'; Juninho 65'; Romão (yellow card) 76'	Stadium: Estádio Municipal de Braga; Attendance: 12,122; Referee: Morten Krogh (Denmark)

22 February 2024 Knockout round play-offs 2nd leg	Qarabağ (Azerbaijan)	2–3 (a.e.t.) (6–5 agg.)	(Portugal) Braga	Baku, Azerbaijan
21:45 AZT (UTC+4)	Romão (yellow card) 35'; Cafarguliyev (yellow card) 53' (yellow-red card) 57'; Bayramov (yellow card) 85'; Vešović (yellow card) 90+1'; Silva 102'; Mustafazadə (yellow card) 111'; Axundzadə 120+2'	Report	Gómez (yellow card) 55'; Fernandes 70'; Djaló 83', (yellow card) 100'; Oliveira (yellow card) 86'; Ndour (yellow card) 110'; Banza 115' (pen.) (yellow card) 120+3'	Stadium: Tofiq Bahramov Republican Stadium; Attendance: 31,200; Referee: Georgi Kabakov (Bulgaria)

7 March 2024 Round of 16 1st leg	Qarabağ (Azerbaijan)	2–2	(Germany) Bayer Leverkusen	Baku, Azerbaijan
21:45 AZT (UTC+4)	Juninho (yellow card) 8', (goal) 45+2'; Benzia 26'	Report	Wirtz 70'; Schick 90+2'	Stadium: Tofiq Bahramov Republican Stadium; Attendance: 30,423; Referee: Benoît Bastien (France)

15 March 2024 Round of 16 2nd leg	Bayer Leverkusen (Germany)	3–2 (5–4 agg.)	(Azerbaijan) Qarabağ	Leverkusen, Germany
00:00 AZT (UTC+4)	Schick (yellow card) 70', (goal) 90+3', 90+7'; Frimpong 72'	Report	Zoubir 58'; Cafarguliyev (red card) 63'; Juninho 67', (yellow card) 78'; Lunyov (yellow card) 90'	Stadium: BayArena; Attendance: 30,210; Referee: Anthony Taylor (England)

== Squad statistics ==
As of match played 2 June 2024

=== Appearances and goals ===
No.	Pos	Nat	Player	Total		Premier League		Azerbaijan Cup		Champions League		Europa League	
No.	Pos	Nat	Player	Apps	Goals	Apps	Goals	Apps	Goals	Apps	Goals	Apps	Goals
2	DF	(Brazil) BRA	Matheus Silva	41	2	19+7	1	4+1	0	0	0	4+6	1
5	DF	(Azerbaijan) AZE	Maksim Medvedev	25	0	14+3	0	1	0	0+1	0	1+5	0
6	MF	(Brazil) BRA	Júlio Romão	51	1	24+6	1	4+1	0	4	0	12	0
7	MF	(Algeria) ALG	Yassine Benzia	49	16	17+10	12	3+1	0	3+1	1	13+1	3
8	MF	(Montenegro) MNE	Marko Janković	48	5	12+12	2	6	1	4	1	14	1
10	MF	(France) FRA	Abdellah Zoubir	55	15	18+14	8	4+1	3	4	1	14	3
11	FW	(France) FRA	Adama Diakhaby	22	7	9+7	5	1+1	2	0+3	0	0+1	0
13	DF	(Azerbaijan) AZE	Bəhlul Mustafazadə	42	2	15+5	0	5+1	0	4	1	12	1
15	MF	(Cape Verde) CPV	Leandro Andrade	59	15	23+14	11	1+3	0	4	0	14	4
17	FW	(France) FRA	Hamidou Keyta	47	8	12+16	6	3+3	2	0+4	0	0+9	0
18	FW	(Brazil) BRA	Juninho	55	31	24+11	20	5	5	0+1	0	10+4	6
19	FW	(Albania) ALB	Redon Xhixha	37	7	9+11	2	2+1	0	4	5	4+6	0
20	MF	(Azerbaijan) AZE	Richard Almeida	22	2	12+4	2	2+1	0	0+2	0	0+1	0
23	GK	(Georgia (country)) GEO	Luka Gugeshashvili	13	0	9	0	1	0	0	0	2+1	0
24	MF	(Azerbaijan) AZE	Aleksey Isayev	22	0	13+4	0	0+3	0	0	0	0+2	0
27	DF	(Azerbaijan) AZE	Toral Bayramov	54	15	26+5	10	2+4	2	2+1	0	6+8	3
29	DF	(Montenegro) MNE	Marko Vešović	26	0	8+6	0	2+2	0	2	0	6	0
30	DF	(Azerbaijan) AZE	Abbas Hüseynov	11	1	8+2	1	1	0	0	0	0	0
44	DF	(Azerbaijan) AZE	Elvin Cafarguliyev	54	1	18+13	1	6	0	4	0	13	0
55	DF	(Azerbaijan) AZE	Badavi Guseynov	36	0	17+3	0	4	0	1	0	6+5	0
66	MF	(Cape Verde) CPV	Patrick Andrade	40	1	15+8	1	0+5	0	0+1	0	2+9	0
81	DF	(Colombia) COL	Kevin Medina	28	1	13+2	0	0	0	3	0	9+1	1
83	DF	(Azerbaijan) AZE	Nihad Guliyev	3	0	3	0	0	0	0	0	0	0
89	GK	(Azerbaijan) AZE	Amin Ramazanov	7	0	7	0	0	0	0	0	0	0
90	MF	(Azerbaijan) AZE	Nariman Akhundzade	48	17	24+7	12	3+2	4	1+3	0	0+8	1
99	GK	(Russia) RUS	Andrey Lunyov	34	0	19	0	5	0	0	0	10	0
Players away on loan:
Players who left Qarabağ during the season:
1	GK	(Azerbaijan) AZE	Shakhruddin Magomedaliyev	7	0	1	0	0	0	4	0	2	0
2	MF	(Azerbaijan) AZE	Qara Qarayev	1	0	0	0	0	0	0+1	0	0	0
4	DF	(Azerbaijan) AZE	Rahil Mammadov	10	0	8+1	0	1	0	0	0	0	0

=== Goal scorers ===
Place	Position	Nation	Number	Name	Premier League	Azerbaijan Cup	Champions League	Europa League	Total
1	FW	(Brazil)	18	Juninho	20	5	0	6	31
2	MF	(Azerbaijan)	90	Nariman Akhundzade	12	4	0	1	17
3	MF	(Algeria)	7	Yassine Benzia	12	0	1	3	16
4	MF	(Cape Verde)	15	Leandro Andrade	11	0	0	4	15
4	DF	(Azerbaijan)	27	Toral Bayramov	10	2	0	3	15
4	MF	(France)	10	Abdellah Zoubir	8	3	1	3	15
7	FW	(France)	17	Hamidou Keyta	6	2	0	0	8
8	FW	(France)	11	Adama Diakhaby	5	2	0	0	7
8	FW	(Albania)	19	Redon Xhixha	2	0	5	0	7
10	MF	(Montenegro)	8	Marko Janković	2	1	1	1	5
11				Own goal	2	2	0	0	4
12	MF	(Azerbaijan)	20	Richard Almeida	2	0	0	0	2
12	DF	(Brazil)	2	Matheus Silva	1	0	0	1	2
12	MF	(Azerbaijan)	13	Bəhlul Mustafazadə	0	0	1	1	2
15	MF	(Cape Verde)	66	Patrick Andrade	1	0	0	0	1
15	MF	(Brazil)	6	Júlio Romão	1	0	0	0	1
15	DF	(Azerbaijan)	30	Abbas Hüseynov	1	0	0	0	1
15	DF	(Azerbaijan)	44	Elvin Cafarguliyev	1	0	0	0	1
15	DF	(Colombia)	81	Kevin Medina	0	0	0	1	1
				TOTALS	97	21	9	24	149

=== Clean sheets ===
Place	Position	Nation	Number	Name	Premier League	Azerbaijan Cup	Champions League	Europa League	Total
1	GK	(Russia)	99	Andrey Lunyov	6	1	0	2	9
2	GK	(Georgia (country))	23	Luka Gugeshashvili	3	1	0	1	5
3	GK	(Azerbaijan)	89	Amin Ramazanov	2	0	0	0	2
4	GK	(Azerbaijan)	1	Shakhruddin Magomedaliyev	0	0	1	0	1
				TOTALS	11	2	1	3	17

=== Disciplinary record ===
Number	Nation	Position	Name	Premier League		Azerbaijan Cup		Champions League		Europa League		Total	
Number	Nation	Position	Name	Yellow card	Red card	Yellow card	Red card	Yellow card	Red card	Yellow card	Red card	Yellow card	Red card
2	(Brazil)	DF	Matheus Silva	1	0	1	0	0	0	1	0	3	0
5	(Azerbaijan)	DF	Maksim Medvedev	4	1	0	0	1	0	0	0	5	1
6	(Brazil)	MF	Júlio Romão	11	0	1	0	0	0	7	0	19	0
7	(Algeria)	MF	Yassine Benzia	3	0	2	0	1	0	0	0	6	0
8	(Montenegro)	MF	Marko Janković	6	0	0	0	1	0	3	0	10	0
10	(France)	MF	Abdellah Zoubir	1	0	0	0	0	0	1	0	2	0
11	(France)	FW	Adama Diakhaby	1	0	0	0	0	0	0	0	1	0
13	(Azerbaijan)	DF	Bəhlul Mustafazadə	1	0	0	0	0	0	2	0	3	0
15	(Cape Verde)	MF	Leandro Andrade	2	0	0	0	0	0	2	0	4	0
17	(France)	FW	Hamidou Keyta	1	0	1	0	0	0	0	0	2	0
18	(Brazil)	FW	Juninho	0	0	1	0	0	0	2	0	3	0
19	(Albania)	FW	Redon Xhixha	1	0	0	0	1	0	1	0	3	0
20	(Azerbaijan)	MF	Richard Almeida	1	0	0	1	1	0	0	0	2	1
23	(Georgia (country))	GK	Luka Gugeshashvili	3	0	0	0	0	0	2	0	5	0
24	(Azerbaijan)	MF	Aleksey Isayev	2	0	0	0	0	0	0	0	2	0
27	(Azerbaijan)	DF	Toral Bayramov	2	0	0	0	1	0	2	0	5	0
29	(Montenegro)	DF	Marko Vešović	1	0	0	0	0	0	2	1	3	1
30	(Azerbaijan)	DF	Abbas Hüseynov	1	0	0	0	0	0	0	0	1	0
44	(Azerbaijan)	DF	Elvin Cafarguliyev	5	0	0	0	0	0	3	2	8	2
55	(Azerbaijan)	DF	Badavi Guseynov	2	0	1	0	0	0	0	0	3	0
66	(Cape Verde)	MF	Patrick Andrade	5	0	0	0	0	0	2	0	7	0
81	(Colombia)	DF	Kevin Medina	4	1	0	0	1	0	3	0	8	1
83	(Azerbaijan)	DF	Nihad Guliyev	1	0	0	0	0	0	0	0	1	0
90	(Azerbaijan)	MF	Nariman Akhundzade	2	0	0	0	0	0	0	0	2	0
99	(Russia)	GK	Andrey Lunyov	1	0	0	0	0	0	1	0	2	0
Players away on loan:
Players who left Qarabağ during the season:
1	(Azerbaijan)	GK	Shakhruddin Magomedaliyev	0	0	0	0	0	0	1	0	1	0
4	(Azerbaijan)	DF	Rahil Mammadov	2	0	0	0	0	0	0	0	2	0
			TOTALS	65	2	7	1	6	0	35	3	113	6
