= Júlio Romão =

Brazilian footballer

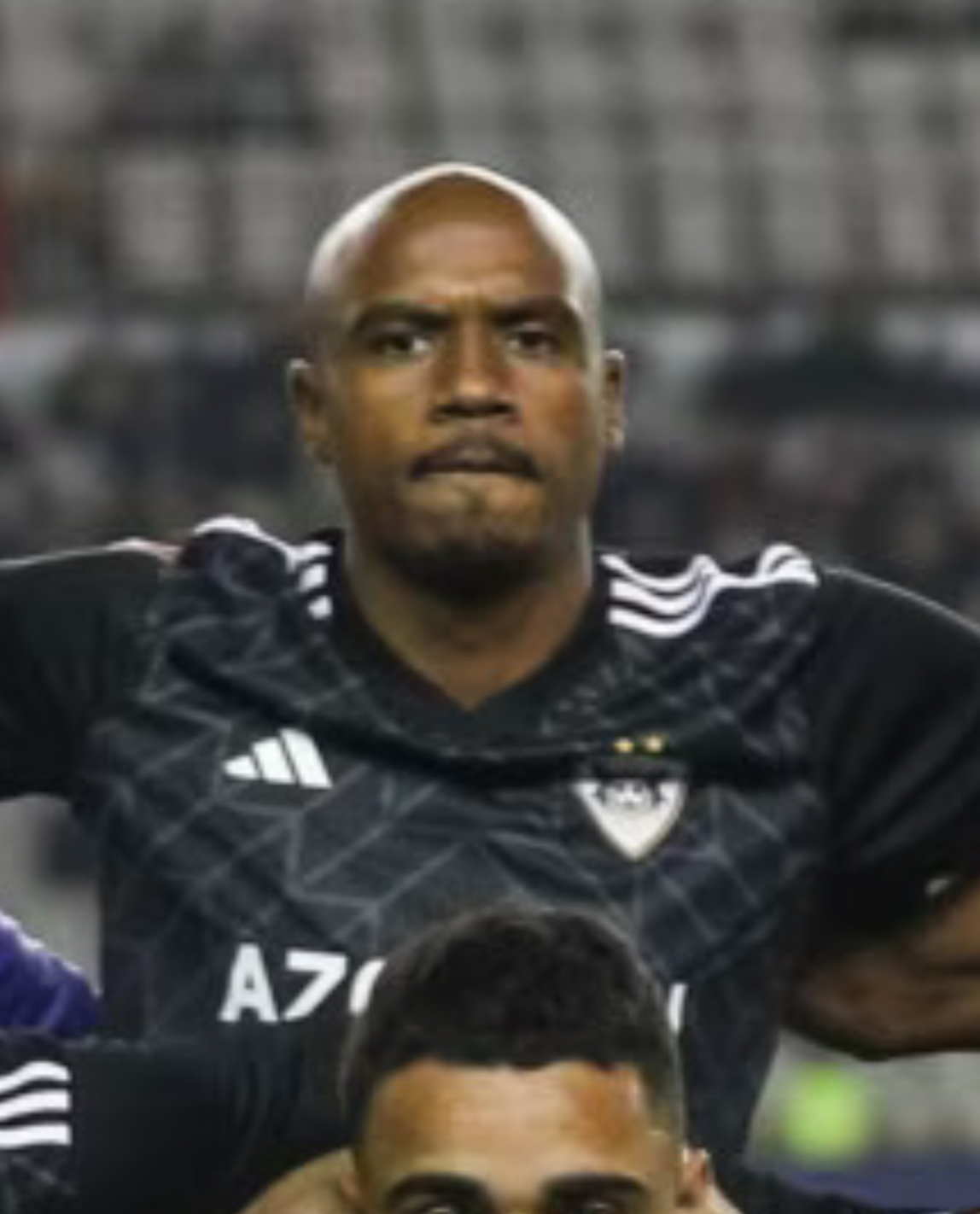

Personal information
- Full name: Júlio Rodrigues Romão
- Date of birth: 29 March 1998 (age 28)
- Place of birth: Belford Roxo, Brazil
- Height: 1.93 m (6 ft 4 in)
- Position: Midfielder

Team information
- Current team: Akhmat Grozny
- Number: 18

Youth career
- 2014–2015: Goiás
- 2016–2018: Paranaense
- 2019–2020: Ponte Preta

Senior career*
Years	Team	Apps	(Gls)
2020–2022	Santa Clara	20	(0)
2022–2025	Qarabağ	75	(2)
2025–2026	Ferencváros	22	(0)
2026–	Akhmat Grozny	9	(0)
- * Club domestic league appearances and goals as of 11 October 2026

Júlio Rodrigues Romão (born 29 March 1998) is a Brazilian professional footballer who plays as a midfielder for Russian Premier League club Akhmat Grozny.

== Career ==
On 18 August 2020, Romão signed a contract with C.D. Santa Clara. He made his professional debut with Santa Clara in a 1–0 Primeira Liga win over Braga on 25 September 2020.

On 17 July 2022, Azerbaijan Premier League club Qarabağ announced he signing of Romão on a contract until the summer of 2026. On 4 February 2025, after 120 games, scoring 2 goals, Qarabağ announced the departure of Romão by mutual agreement.

On 5 February 2025, Nemzeti Bajnokság I club Ferencváros announced the signing of Romão.

On 9 July 2026, Romão signed a three-year contract with Akhmat Grozny in Russia.

== Career statistics ==
As of 14 October 2026

Club	Season	League			Cup		Continental		Other		Total	
Club	Season	Division	Apps	Goals	Apps	Goals	Apps	Goals	Apps	Goals	Apps	Goals
Santa Clara	2020–21	Primeira Liga	5	0	1	0	—		—		6	0
Santa Clara	2021–22	Primeira Liga	15	0	2	0	1 (Note: Appearance in UEFA Conference League)	0	2 (Note: Appearances in Taça da Liga)	0	20	0
Santa Clara	Total		20	0	3	0	1	0	2	0	26	0
Qarabağ	2022–23	Azerbaijan Premier League	30	1	1	0	10 (Note: Two appearances in UEFA Champions League, six appearances in UEFA Europa League, two appearances in UEFA Conference League)	0	—		41	1
Qarabağ	2023–24	Azerbaijan Premier League	30	1	5	0	16 (Note: Four appearances in UEFA Champions League, twelve appearances in UEFA Europa League)	0	—		51	1
Qarabağ	2024–25	Azerbaijan Premier League	15	0	0	0	13 (Note: Six appearances in UEFA Champions League, seven appearances in UEFA Europa League)	0	—		28	0
Qarabağ	Total		75	2	6	0	39	0	0	0	120	2
Ferencváros	2024–25	NB I	9	0	2	0	2 (Note: Appearances in UEFA Europa League)	0	—		13	0
Ferencváros	2025–26	NB I	13	0	5	0	9	0	—		27	0
Ferencváros	Total		22	0	7	0	11	0	0	0	40	0
Akhmat Grozny	2026–27	Russian Premier League	9	0	4	0	—		—		13	0
Career total			126	2	20	0	51	0	2	0	199	2

== Honours ==
Qarabağ

- Azerbaijan Premier League: 2022–23, 2023–24, 2024–25
- Azerbaijan Cup: 2023–24

Ferencváros

- NB I: 2024–25
- Hungarian Cup: 2025–26
