= Badavi Guseynov =

Azerbaijani footballer (born 1991)

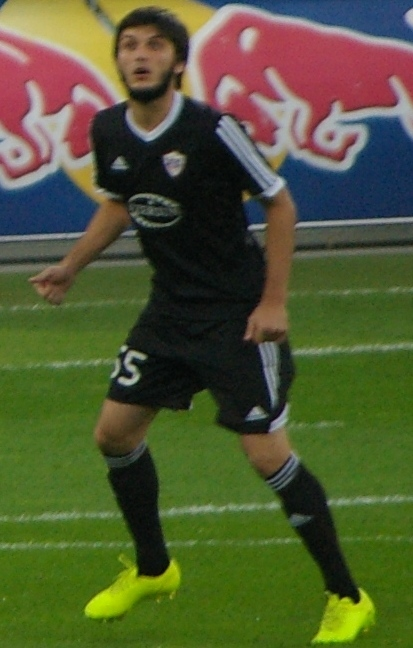
- Guseynov in 2014

Personal information
- Full name: Badavi Ruslanovich Guseynov
- Date of birth: 11 July 1991 (age 35)
- Place of birth: Kaspiysk, Dagestan, Russian SFSR, Soviet Union
- Height: 1.83 m (6 ft 0 in)
- Position: Centre-back

Team information
- Current team: Qarabağ
- Number: 55

Senior career*
Years	Team	Apps	(Gls)
2008–2010	Dagdizel Kaspiysk	49	(0)
2010–2012	Anzhi Makhachkala	0	(0)
2011–2012	→ Sumgayit (loan)	26	(0)
2012–	Qarabağ	267	(6)

International career^{‡}
2011–2012	Azerbaijan U21	8	(0)
2012–	Azerbaijan	85	(1)
- * Club domestic league appearances and goals as of 22 June 2026 ‡ National team caps and goals as of 15:00, 15 November 2026 (UTC)

Badavi Ruslanovich Guseynov (Azerbaijani: Bədavi Ruslan oğlu Hüseynov; Russian: Бадави Русланович Гусейнов; born 11 July 1991) is a professional footballer who plays centre-back for Qarabağ. Born in Russia, he plays for the Azerbaijan national team.

== Club career ==
Badavi Guseynov is a product of Dagestani football. In 2007 he joined FC Dagdizel Kaspiysk. In August 2010 he moved to the Anzhi Makhachkala youth team. Despite being a captain of the youth team, he didn't make his senior debut for Anzhi and he moved to Azerbaijani club Sumgayit on loan for 2011/12 season. In the summer of 2012 he signed with Qarabağ.

In 2015, Guseynov turned down an offer to return to FC Anzhi Makhachkala to sign a new contract with Qarabağ until the summer of 2018.

== International career ==
=== Under 21 and Youth ===
On August 18, 2011, along with his teammate Michael Zaitsev was invited to a training camp of the Azerbaijan U-21 in Germany Frankfurt, which took place from 22 to 29 August. For the youth team, he debuted in the qualifying match for the European championship among youth teams in 2013, having played the entire match against England U21.

=== Senior team ===
In February 2012, he was called to the national team, was also included in the team for the match against Singapore, which took place in the UAE, but the field was never released. [7] He made his debut for the national team on February 29 in a match against Palestine.

== Career statistics ==
=== Club ===
As of match played 24 May 2025

Appearances and goals by club, season and competition
Club	Season	League			National cup		Continental		Other		Total	
Club	Season	Division	Apps	Goals	Apps	Goals	Apps	Goals	Apps	Goals	Apps	Goals
Dagdizel Kaspiysk	2008	Russian Second Division	12	0			–		–		12	0
Dagdizel Kaspiysk	2009	Russian Second Division	17	0			–		–		17	0
Dagdizel Kaspiysk	2010	Russian Second Division	20	0			–		–		20	0
Dagdizel Kaspiysk	Total		49	0			0	0	0	0	49	0
Anzhi Makhachkala	2010	Russian Premier League	0	0	0	0	–		–		0	0
Anzhi Makhachkala	2011–12	Russian Premier League	0	0	0	0	–		–		0	0
Anzhi Makhachkala	Total		0	0	0	0	0	0	0	0	0	0
Sumgayit (loan)	2011–12	Azerbaijan Premier League	26	0	2	0	–		–		28	0
Qarabağ	2012–13	Azerbaijan Premier League	17	0	4	0	–		–		21	0
Qarabağ	2013–14	Azerbaijan Premier League	32	0	3	0	1 (Note: Appearances in the UEFA Europa League)	0	–		36	0
Qarabağ	2014–15	Azerbaijan Premier League	28	1	3	0	12 (Note: Four appearances in the UEFA Champions League, and eight appearances in the UEFA Europa League)	0	–		43	1
Qarabağ	2015–16	Azerbaijan Premier League	30	0	4	0	12 (Note: Four appearances in the UEFA Champions League, and eight appearances in the UEFA Europa League)	0	–		46	0
Qarabağ	2016–17	Azerbaijan Premier League	20	1	3	0	9 (Note: Four appearances in the UEFA Champions League, and five appearances in the UEFA Europa League)	0	–		32	1
Qarabağ	2017–18	Azerbaijan Premier League	6	0	0	0	9 (Note: Appearances in the UEFA Champions League)	0	–		15	0
Qarabağ	2018–19	Azerbaijan Premier League	19	1	3	0	11 (Note: Six appearances in the UEFA Champions League, and five appearances in the UEFA Europa League)	0	–		33	1
Qarabağ	2019–20	Azerbaijan Premier League	14	1	2	0	6 (Note: Zero appearances in the UEFA Champions League, and six appearances in the UEFA Europa League)	0	–		22	1
Qarabağ	2020–21	Azerbaijan Premier League	22	1	3	0	6 (Note: Three appearances in the UEFA Champions League, and two appearances in the UEFA Europa League)	0	–		30	1
Qarabağ	2021–22	Azerbaijan Premier League	3	0	1	0	0 (Note: Appearances in the Europa Conference League)	0	–		4	0
Qarabağ	2022–23	Azerbaijan Premier League	20	0	1	0	11	0	–		32	0
Qarabağ	2023–24	Azerbaijan Premier League	20	0	4	0	12	0	–		36	0
Qarabağ	2024–25	Azerbaijan Premier League	20	0	2	0	6 (Note: One appearance in the UEFA Champions League, and five appearances in the UEFA Europa League)}	0	–		28	0
Qarabağ	Total		251	5	33	0	95	0	0	0	379	5
Career total			325	5	35	0	95	0	0	0	456	5

=== International ===
As of match played 5 December 2022

Appearances and goals by national team and year
National team	Year	Apps	Goals
Azerbaijan	2012	2	0
Azerbaijan	2013	6	0
Azerbaijan	2014	6	0
Azerbaijan	2015	7	0
Azerbaijan	2016	5	0
Azerbaijan	2017	6	0
Azerbaijan	2018	7	0
Azerbaijan	2019	8	0
Azerbaijan	2020	6	0
Azerbaijan	2021	5	1
Azerbaijan	2022	6	0
Total		64	1

== Honours ==
Qarabağ

- Azerbaijan Premier League: (7) 2013–14, 2014–15, 2015–16, 2016–17, 2017–18, 2018–19, 2019–20
- Azerbaijan Cup: (2) 2014–15, 2015–16
