= Nariman Akhundzade =

Azerbaijan footballer (born 2004)

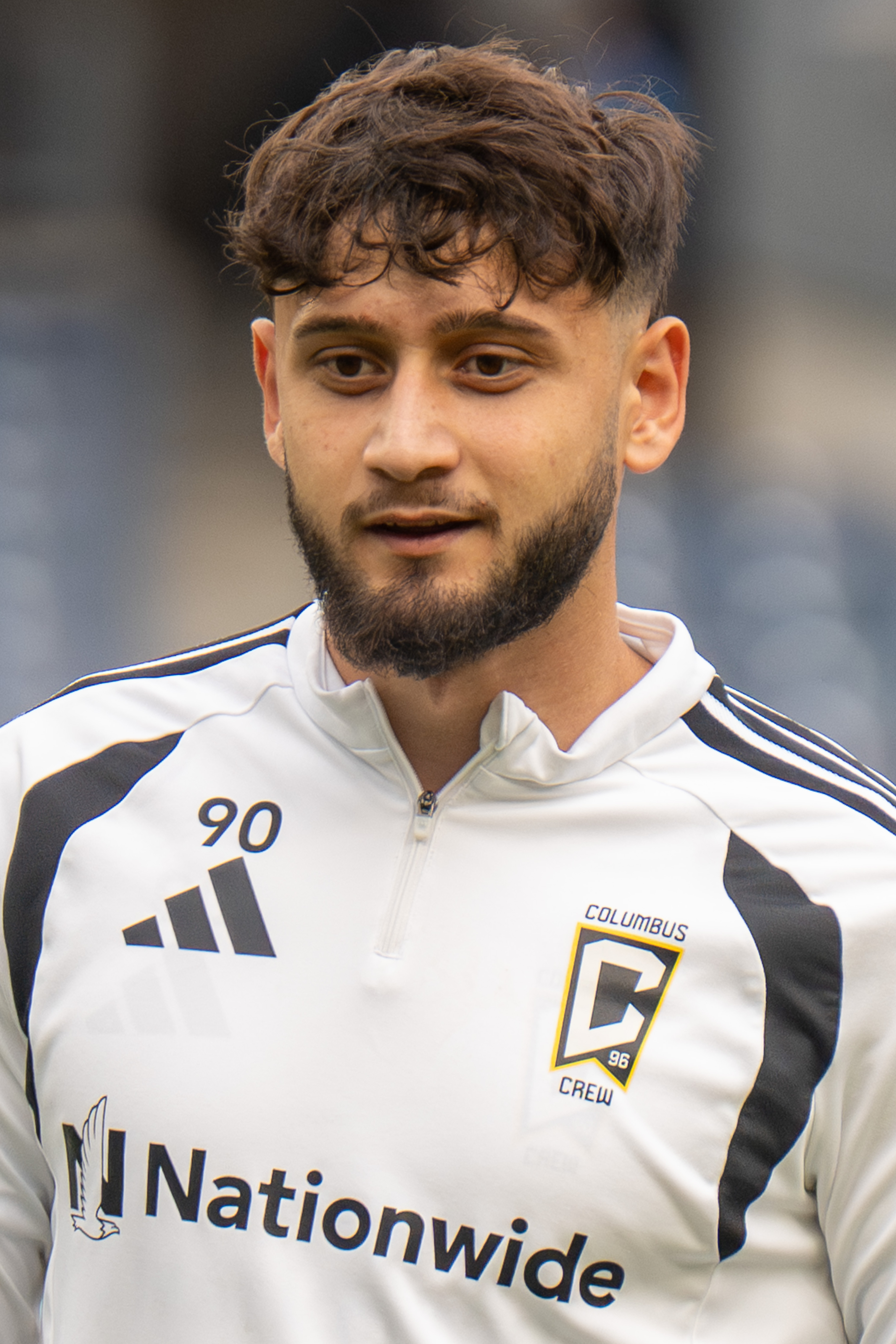
- Akhundzade with Columbus Crew in 2026

Personal information
- Full name: Nariman Ahmad oğlu Akhundzade
- Date of birth: 23 April 2004 (age 22)
- Place of birth: Baku, Azerbaijan
- Height: 1.85 m (6 ft 1 in)
- Position: Winger

Team information
- Current team: Erzurumspor (on loan from Columbus Crew)
- Number: 90

Youth career
- 2013–2022: Qarabağ

Senior career*
Years	Team	Apps	(Gls)
2022–2026	Qarabağ	84	(24)
2026–	Columbus Crew	7	(0)
2026–	→ Erzurumspor (loan)	3	(0)

International career^{‡}
2022	Azerbaijan U19	6	(2)
2022–	Azerbaijan U21	13	(2)
2023–	Azerbaijan	15	(0)
Medal record
Men's football
Representing Azerbaijan
Islamic Solidarity Games
Bronze medal – third place	2021 Konya
- * Club domestic league appearances and goals as of 10 October 2026 ‡ National team caps and goals as of 6 October 2026

Nariman Ahmad oğlu Akhundzade (Azerbaijani: Nəriman Əhməd oğlu Axundzadə, born 23 April 2004) is an Azerbaijani professional footballer who plays as a winger for Süper Lig club Erzurumspor in Turkey on loan from American club Columbus Crew, and the Azerbaijan national team.

== Club career ==
=== Qarabağ ===
Akhundzade joined the youth academy of Qarabağ at the age of 9, and worked his way up their youth categories. He debuted with Qarabağ in a 4–0 Azerbaijan Premier League win over Shamakhi FK on 30 October 2022. In his debut season, he helped them win the 2022–23 Azerbaijan Premier League. On 22 February 2024, he scored the deciding goal in stoppage time after extra time to secure a 6–5 aggregate win over Braga in the Europa League knockout round play-offs, guaranteeing his team a place in the next stage of the competition.

=== Columbus Crew ===
On 10 February 2026, the Columbus Crew announced that they had acquired Akhundzade for an undisclosed fee through the leagues' U22 initiative.

== International career ==
Akhundzade is a youth international for Azerbaijan, having played up to the Azerbaijan U21s. He was a part of the squad that played at the 2021 Islamic Solidarity Games. He debuted with the senior Azerbaijan national team in a UEFA Euro 2024 qualifying loss to Belgium on 19 November 2023.

== Career statistics ==
As of match played 10 February 2026

Appearances and goals by club, season and competition
Club	Season	League			National cup (Note: Includes the Azerbaijan Cup and U.S. Open Cup)		League cup (Note: Includes the Leagues Cup)		Continental		Other		Total	
Club	Season	Division	Apps	Goals	Apps	Goals	Apps	Goals	Apps	Goals	Apps	Goals	Apps	Goals
Qarabağ	2022–23	Azerbaijan Premier League	9	0	0	0	—		0	0	—		9	0
Qarabağ	2023–24	Azerbaijan Premier League	31	12	5	4	-—		12 (Note: Four appearances in UEFA Champions League, eight appearances and one goal in UEFA Europa League)	1	—		48	17
Qarabağ	2024–25	Azerbaijan Premier League	31	9	5	2	—		8 (Note: Four appearances in UEFA Champions League, four appearances in UEFA Europa League)	0	—		44	11
Qarabağ	2025–26	Azerbaijan Premier League	13	3	1	2	—		12 (Note: Appearances and goals in the UEFA Champions League)	2	—		26	7
Qarabağ	Total		84	24	11	8	—	—	32	3	—	—	127	35
Columbus Crew	2026	Major League Soccer	0	0	0	0	0	0	—		—		0	0
Career total			84	24	11	8	0	0	32	3	0	0	127	35

== Honours ==
Qarabağ

- Azerbaijan Premier League: 2022–23, 2023–24, 2024–25
- Azerbaijan Cup: 2023–24
