= Andrey Lunyov =

Russian footballer (born 1991)

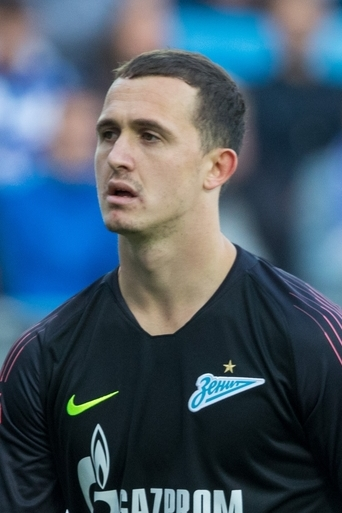
- Lunyov with Zenit Saint Petersburg in 2018

Personal information
- Full name: Andrey Yevgenyevich Lunyov
- Date of birth: 13 November 1991 (age 35)
- Place of birth: Moscow, Russian SFSR, Soviet Union
- Height: 1.90 m (6 ft 3 in)
- Position: Goalkeeper

Team information
- Current team: Dynamo Moscow
- Number: 99

Youth career
- MFK Dina Moskva
- 2001–2009: Torpedo Moscow

Senior career*
Years	Team	Apps	(Gls)
2009–2014	Torpedo Moscow	9	(0)
2012	→ Istra (loan)	9	(0)
2013–2014	→ Kaluga (loan)	28	(0)
2015	Saturn Moscow Oblast	4	(0)
2015–2016	Ufa	10	(0)
2017–2021	Zenit Saint Petersburg	90	(0)
2021–2023	Bayer Leverkusen	2	(0)
2023–2024	Qarabağ	19	(0)
2024–	Dynamo Moscow	48	(0)

International career^{‡}
2017–	Russia	9	(0)
- * Club domestic league appearances and goals as of 22 November 2026 ‡ National team caps and goals as of 10 June 2025

Andrey Yevgenyevich Lunyov (Russian: Андрей Евгеньевич Лунёв; born 13 November 1991) is a Russian professional footballer who played as a goalkeeper for Dynamo Moscow and the Russia national team.

== Club career ==
=== Ufa ===
On 29 July 2015, it was confirmed that Lunyov would be joining FC Ufa on a 1-year contract. He made his Russian Premier League debut for Ufa on 11 September 2016 in a game against FC Krasnodar.

=== Zenit ===
On 23 December 2016, Lunyov moved to FC Zenit Saint Petersburg, signing a 4.5-year contract with the club.

=== Bayer Leverkusen ===
On 10 July 2021, he signed a two-year contract with Bayer Leverkusen.

=== Qarabağ ===
On 19 August 2023, he signed contract with Qarabağ. On 4 June 2024, Qarabağ announced that Lunyov had left the club after his contract had expired.

=== Dynamo Moscow ===
On 18 June 2024, Lunyov joined Dynamo Moscow on a two-year contract with an optional third year. Dynamo fans selected him as Player of the Month for games played in July and August 2024. On 19 June 2026, Lunyov extended his contract for the 2026–27 season, with options for 2027–28 and 2028–29 seasons.

== International career ==
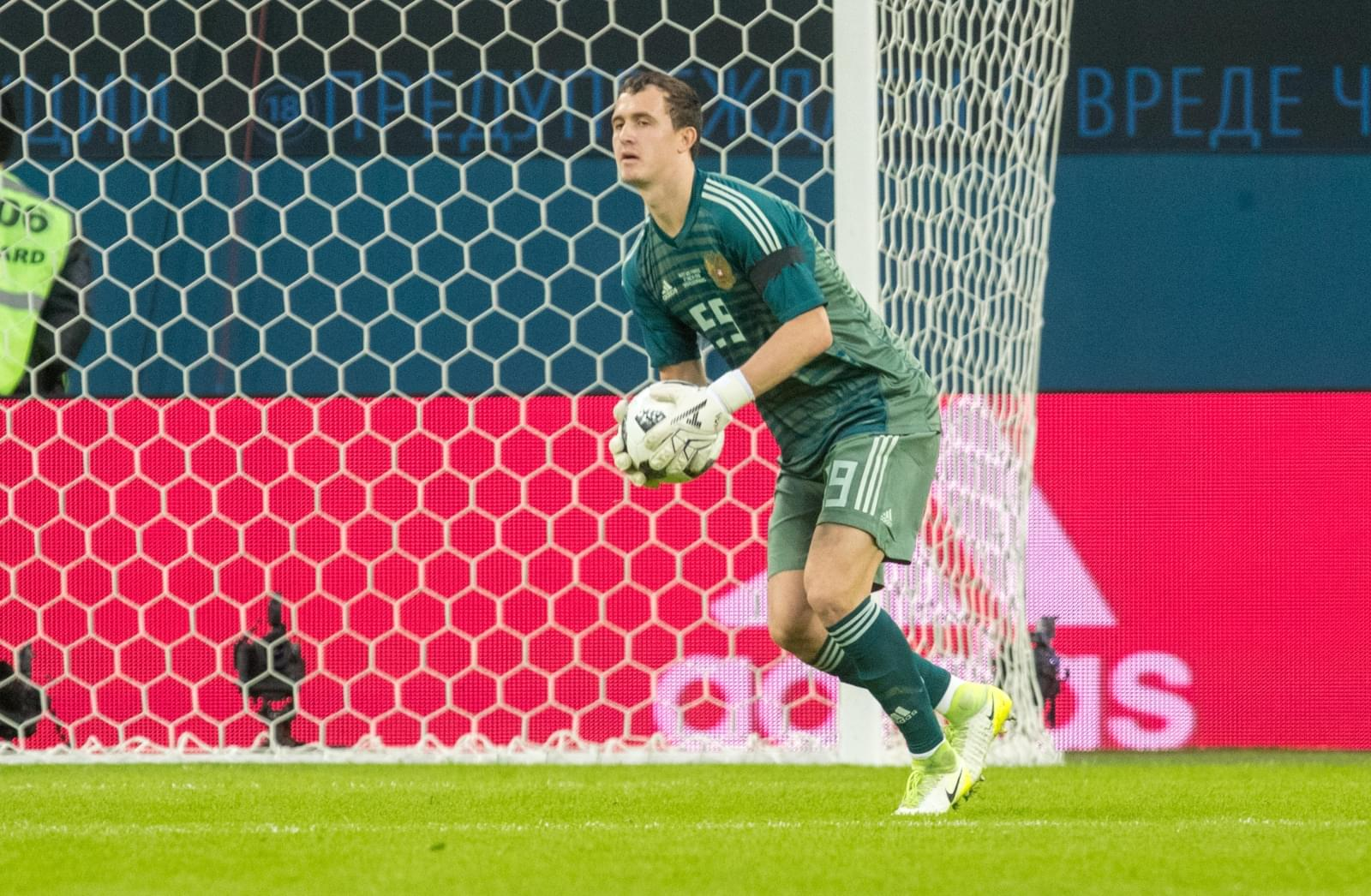
Lunyov playing for Russia in 2018

He made his debut for the Russia national football team on 10 October 2017 in a friendly game against Iran.

On 11 May 2018, he was included in Russia's extended 2018 FIFA World Cup squad. On 3 June 2018, he was included in the finalized World Cup squad. He remained on the bench in all the games behind Igor Akinfeev.

On 11 May 2021, he was included in the preliminary extended 30-man squad for UEFA Euro 2020. He was not included in the final squad.

== Career statistics ==
=== Club ===
As of match played 22 November 2026

Appearances and goals by club, season and competition
Club	Season	League			National cup		Continental		Other		Total	
Club	Season	Division	Apps	Goals	Apps	Goals	Apps	Goals	Apps	Goals	Apps	Goals
Torpedo Moscow	2009	Russian Amateur Football League	11	0	—		—		—		11	0
Torpedo Moscow	2010	Russian Second League	7	0	2	0	—		—		9	0
Torpedo Moscow	2011–12	Russian First League	0	0	0	0	—		—		0	0
Torpedo Moscow	Total		18	0	2	0	—		—		20	0
Istra	2011–12	Russian Second League	9	0	0	0	—		—		9	0
Torpedo Moscow	2012–13	Russian First League	2	0	1	0	—		—		3	0
Kaluga	2013–14	Russian Second League	28	0	0	0	—		—		28	0
Saturn Ramenskoye	2014–15	Russian Second League	4	0	0	0	—		—		4	0
Ufa	2015–16	Russian Premier League	0	0	0	0	—		—		0	0
Ufa	2016–17	Russian Premier League	10	0	1	0	—		—		11	0
Ufa	Total		10	0	1	0	—		—		11	0
Zenit Saint Petersburg	2016–17	Russian Premier League	10	0	—		—		—		10	0
Zenit Saint Petersburg	2017–18	Russian Premier League	20	0	0	0	11 (Note: Appearance(s) in UEFA Europa League)	0	—		31	0
Zenit Saint Petersburg	2018–19	Russian Premier League	29	0	1	0	12	0	—		42	0
Zenit Saint Petersburg	2019–20	Russian Premier League	19	0	0	0	2 (Note: Appearances in UEFA Champions League)	0	1 (Note: Appearance in Russian Super Cup)	0	22	0
Zenit Saint Petersburg	2020–21	Russian Premier League	12	0	1	0	0	0	—		13	0
Zenit Saint Petersburg	Total		90	0	2	0	25	0	1	0	118	0
Bayer Leverkusen	2021–22	Bundesliga	1	0	0	0	1	0	—		2	0
Bayer Leverkusen	2022–23	Bundesliga	1	0	0	0	0	0	—		1	0
Bayer Leverkusen	Total		2	0	0	0	1	0	—		3	0
Qarabağ	2023–24	Azerbaijan Premier League	19	0	5	0	10	0	—		34	0
Dynamo Moscow	2024–25	Russian Premier League	26	0	4	0	—		—		30	0
Dynamo Moscow	2025–26	Russian Premier League	14	0	4	0	—		—		18	0
Dynamo Moscow	2026–27	Russian Premier League	8	0	0	0	—		—		8	0
Dynamo Moscow	Total		48	0	8	0	0	0	0	0	56	0
Career total			231	0	19	0	37	0	1	0	286	0

=== International ===
As of match played 10 June 2025

Appearances and goals by national team and year
National team	Year	Apps	Goals
Russia	2017	2	0
Russia	2018	5	0
Russia	2024	1	0
Russia	2025	1	0
Total		9	0

== Honours ==
Zenit Saint Petersburg

- Russian Premier League: 2018–19, 2019–20, 2020–21
- Russian Cup: 2019–20

Qarabağ

- Azerbaijan Premier League: 2023–24
- Azerbaijan Cup: 2023–24
