= Matheus Silva (footballer, born October 1997) =

Brazilian footballer

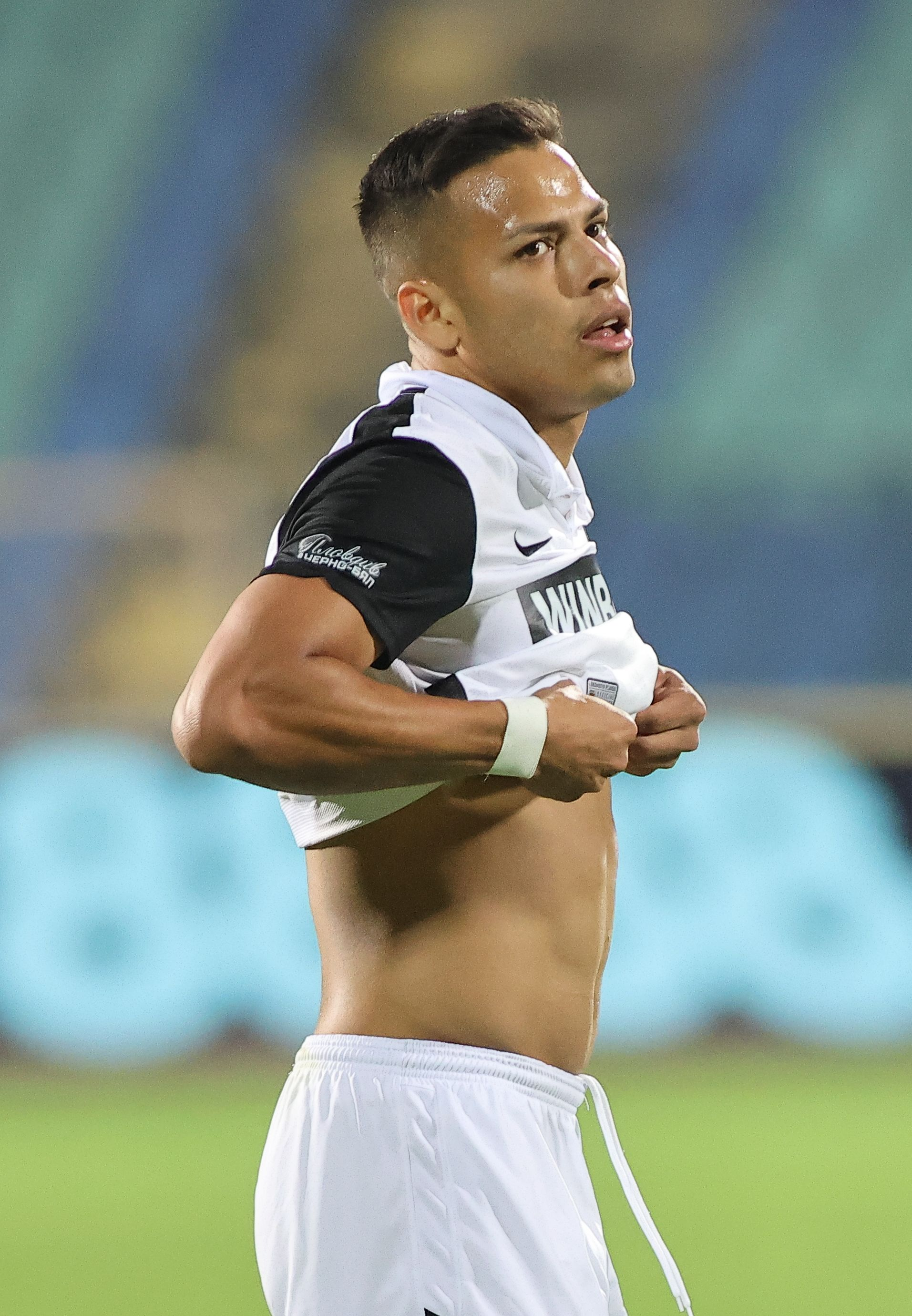

Personal information
- Full name: Matheus de Barros da Silva
- Date of birth: 3 October 1997 (age 29)
- Place of birth: Marituba, Brazil
- Height: 1.82 m (6 ft 0 in)
- Position: Right-back

Team information
- Current team: Qarabağ
- Number: 2

Senior career*
Years	Team	Apps	(Gls)
2017	São Francisco	10	(0)
2018–2019	Paysandu	23	(0)
2019–2020	Bahia	5	(0)
2019–2020	→Farense (loan)	19	(3)
2020–2022	Moreirense	24	(0)
2022–2023	Lokomotiv Plovdiv	36	(2)
2023–	Qarabağ	79	(3)
- * Club domestic league appearances and goals as of 22 June 2026

Matheus de Barros da Silva (born 3 October 1997) is a Brazilian professional footballer who plays as a right-back for Azerbaijan Premier League club Qarabağ.

== Career ==
Silva made his professional debut with Bahia in a 0–0 Campeonato Brasileiro Série B tie with Fluminense de Feira on 20 January 2019. On 22 August 2020, Silva signed a professional contract with Moreirense. In July 2022, Silva joined Bulgarian club Lokomotiv Plovdiv.

On 22 August 2023, the Azerbaijan Premier League club Qarabağ signed Silva on a 2+2 year contract. He made his debut for the club in the 2023–24 UEFA Europa League match against Olimpija Ljubljana, coming on as a substitute for Benzia in the 75th minute of a 2–0 victory.
