= Patrick Andrade =

Cape Verdean footballer (born 1993)

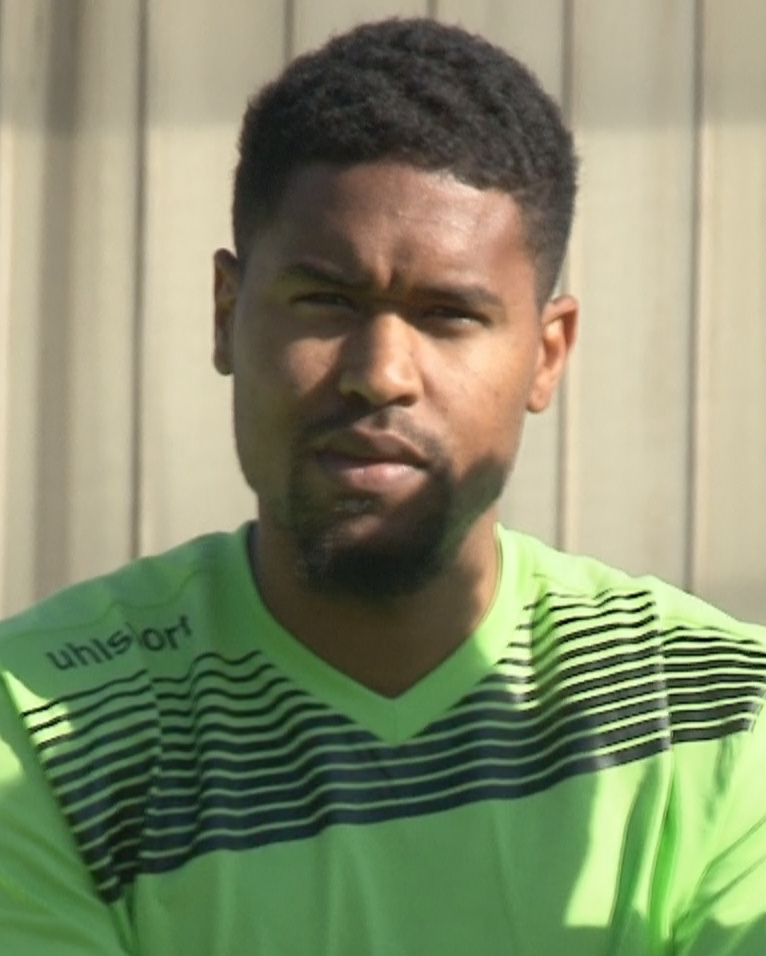
- Andrade in 2018

Personal information
- Full name: Erickson Patrick Correia Andrade
- Date of birth: 9 February 1993 (age 33)
- Place of birth: Praia, Cape Verde
- Height: 1.76 m (5 ft 9 1/2 in)
- Position: Midfielder

Team information
- Current team: Araz-Naxçıvan
- Number: 6

Senior career*
Years	Team	Apps	(Gls)
2009–2012	Sporting Praia	44	(3)
2012–2013	Desportivo Praia	27	(2)
2013	Benfica Praia	13	(0)
2013–2014	Ribeirão	3	(0)
2013–2014	→ Joane (loan)	23	(2)
2014–2018	Moreirense	9	(0)
2016–2017	→ Famalicão (loan)	9	(0)
2017–2018	→ Salgueiros (loan)	37	(3)
2018–2020	Cherno More	52	(5)
2020–2022	Qarabağ	46	(7)
2022–2023	Partizan	16	(0)
2023–2025	Qarabağ	46	(2)
2025–	Araz-Naxçıvan	31	(5)

International career^{‡}
2020–	Cape Verde	29	(0)
- * Club domestic league appearances and goals as of 22 June 2026 ‡ National team caps and goals as of 23:58, 25 December 2025 (UTC)

Erickson Patrick Correia Andrade (born 9 February 1993) is a Cape Verdean professional footballer who plays as a midfielder for Azerbaijan Premier League club Araz-Naxçıvan and the Cape Verde national team.

== Club career ==
On 14 January 2015, Andrade made his professional debut with Moreirense in a 2014–15 Taça da Liga match against Nacional.

On 26 June 2018, Andrade signed with Bulgarian club Cherno More. On 30 July, he made his official debut in a 2–2 away draw against Levski Sofia.

On 28 August 2020, Andrade signed a three-year contract with Qarabağ FK. On 11 June 2025, Andrade's contract with Qarabağ expired and was not renewed.

== International career ==
On 1 October 2020, Andrade was called by Cape Verde. Andrade first represented the Cape Verde national team in a friendly 2–1 loss to Guinea on 10 October 2020. He was named in the roster for the 2021 Africa Cup of Nations when the team reached the round of 16.
