= Toral Bayramov =

Azerbaijani footballer (born 2001)

Personal information
- Full name: Toral Mais oğlu Bayramov
- Date of birth: 23 February 2001 (age 25)
- Place of birth: Lankaran, Azerbaijan
- Height: 1.85 m (6 ft 1 in)
- Positions: Left-back; winger

Team information
- Current team: Bursaspor
- Number: 27

Youth career
- Khazar Lankaran

Senior career*
Years	Team	Apps	(Gls)
2019–2026	Qarabağ	151	(25)
2026–	Bursaspor	8	(0)

International career^{‡}
2018–2019	Azerbaijan U19	11	(3)
2019–2020	Azerbaijan U21	5	(1)
2021–	Azerbaijan	47	(5)
- * Club domestic league appearances and goals as of 19 October 2026 ‡ National team caps and goals as of 15 November 2026

Toral Mais oğlu Bayramov (born 23 February 2001) is an Azerbaijani professional footballer who plays as a left-back for Turkish TFF 1. Lig club Bursaspor and the Azerbaijan national team.

== Club career ==
Bayramov made his debut for Qarabağ on 23 September 2019, in the Azerbaijan Premier League match against Zira.

== International career ==
He made his debut for the Azerbaijan national team on 27 May 2021 in a friendly against Turkey.

== Career statistics ==
=== International ===
As of match played 10 June 2025

Appearances and goals by national team and year
National team	Year	Apps	Goals
Azerbaijan	2021	7	0
Azerbaijan	2022	4	0
Azerbaijan	2023	8	1
Azerbaijan	2024	10	3
Azerbaijan	2025	9	0
Azerbaijan	2026	1	1
Total		39	5

Scores and results list Azerbaijan's goal tally first, score column indicates score after each Bayramov goal.

List of international goals scored by Toral Bayramov
No.	Date	Venue	Opponent	Score	Result	Competition
1	13 October 2023	Lilleküla Stadium, Tallinn, Estonia	Estonia	1–0	2–0	UEFA Euro 2024 qualifying
2	11 June 2024	Haladás Sportkomplexum, Szombathely, Hungary	Kazakhstan	3–2	3–2	Friendly
3	11 October 2024	Lilleküla Stadium, Tallinn, Estonia	Estonia	1–1	1–3	2024–25 UEFA Nations League
4	14 October 2024	Tofiq Bahramov Republican Stadium, Baku, Azerbaijan	Slovakia	1–1	1–3	2024–25 UEFA Nations League
5	27 March 2026	Sumgayit City Stadium, Sumgait, Azerbaijan	Saint Lucia	4–1	6–1	2026 FIFA Series

== Honours ==
Qarabağ

- Azerbaijan Premier League: 2019–20, 2021–22, 2022–23, 2023–24, 2024–25
- Azerbaijan Cup: 2021–22, 2023–24
