= Hamidou Keyta =

French professional footballer (born 1994)

Personal information
- Date of birth: 17 December 1994 (age 31)
- Place of birth: Montivilliers, France
- Height: 1.90 m (6 ft 3 in)
- Position: Winger

Team information
- Current team: Araz-Nakhchivan
- Number: 7

Youth career
- Auxerre

Senior career*
Years	Team	Apps	(Gls)
2013–2014	Auxerre II	8	(2)
2014–2015	Le Havre II	21	(6)
2015–2016	Trélissac	27	(9)
2016–2017	Saint-Étienne	4	(0)
2016–2017	Saint-Étienne II	10	(3)
2017–2018	Chambly	16	(0)
2017–2018	Chambly II	4	(1)
2018–2019	Dunărea Călărași	20	(1)
2019	Viitorul Constanța	0	(0)
2019–2021	Botoșani	52	(17)
2021–2022	Santa Clara	3	(0)
2022–2023	Zira	46	(13)
2023–2024	Qarabağ	31	(7)
2024–2025	Konyaspor	18	(1)
2025–	Araz-Nakhchivan	28	(3)
- * Club domestic league appearances and goals as of 22 June 2026

Hamidou Keyta (born 17 December 1994) is a French professional footballer who plays as a forward for Azerbaijani club Araz-Nakhchivan.

== Club career ==
Keyta made his professional debut for Saint-Étienne in a 1–1 Ligue 1 tie with Lille on 13 January 2017.

On 31 July 2021, he joined Portuguese club Santa Clara on a two-year contract.

On 26 January 2022, Keyta signed an 18-month contract with Zira.

On 3 June 2023, Qarabağ announced the signing of Keyta from Zira on a contract three-year contract.

On 9 September 2024, Qarabağ announced the departure of Keyta by mutual agreement. On 10 September, Konyaspor signed a two-year contract with him.

On 1 July 2025, he joined Azerbaijani club Araz-Nakhchivan one-year contract.

== Personal life ==
Keyta is of Senegalese descent.
