= Abbas Hüseynov =

Azerbaijani footballer (born 1995)

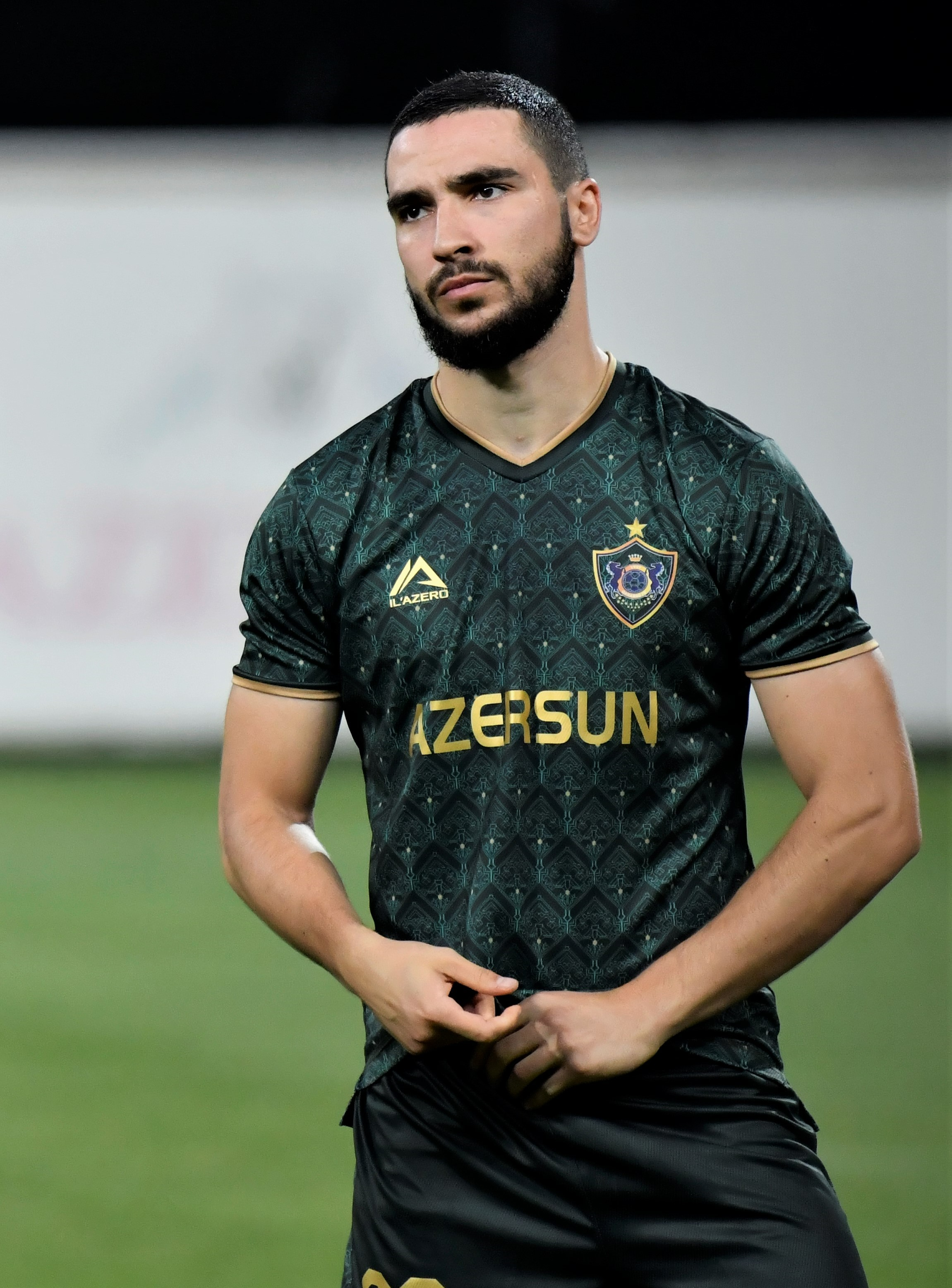
- Hüseynov with Qarabağ in 2022

Personal information
- Full name: Abbas İsrafil oğlu Hüseynov
- Date of birth: 13 June 1995 (age 31)
- Place of birth: Ganja, Azerbaijan
- Height: 1.79 m (5 ft 10 1/2 in)
- Position: Right-back

Team information
- Current team: Qarabağ
- Number: 30

Youth career
- Keşla

Senior career*
Years	Team	Apps	(Gls)
2014–2017	Keşla	43	(0)
2017–	Qarabağ	125	(4)

International career^{‡}
2015–2016	Azerbaijan U21	5	(0)
2018–	Azerbaijan	34	(0)
- * Club domestic league appearances and goals as of 22 June 2026 ‡ National team caps and goals as of 18:50, 16 November 2025 (UTC)

Abbas İsrafil oğlu Hüseynov (born 13 June 1995) is an Azerbaijani professional footballer who plays as a defender for Azerbaijan Premier League club Qarabağ and the Azerbaijan national team.

== Career ==
=== International ===
On 30 January 2018, Hüseynov made his senior international debut for Azerbaijan friendly game against Moldova.

== Career statistics ==
=== International ===
Azerbaijan national team
Year	Apps	Goals
2018	1	0
2019	2	0
2020	5	0
2021	7	0
Total	15	0

Statistics accurate as of match played 7 September 2021

== Honours ==
Qarabağ

- Azerbaijan Premier League: (3) 2017–18, 2018–19, 2019–20
