= Kevin Medina (Colombian footballer) =

Colombian footballer (born 1993)

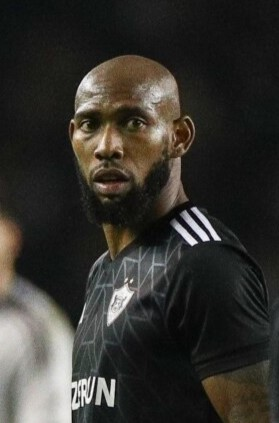
- Medina in 2024

Personal information
- Full name: Kevin David Medina Rentería
- Date of birth: 9 March 1993 (age 33)
- Place of birth: Bogotá, Colombia
- Height: 1.85 m (6 ft 1 in)
- Position: Centre-back

Team information
- Current team: Johor Darul Ta'zim
- Number: 81

Senior career*
Years	Team	Apps	(Gls)
2014–2015	Naval	9	(2)
2015–2017	Moura	61	(3)
2017–2018	Sintrense	13	(0)
2018	Pinhalnovense	12	(1)
2018–2019	Académico Viseu	34	(1)
2019–2020	Chaves	13	(0)
2020–2026	Qarabağ	121	(3)
2026–	Johor Darul Ta'zim	0	(0)
- * Club domestic league appearances and goals as of 3 July 2026

Kevin David Medina Rentería (born 9 March 1993) is a Colombian professional footballer who plays as a centre-back for Malaysia Super League club Johor Darul Ta'zim.

== Career ==
On 19 July 2020, Medina signed a three-year contract with Qarabağ FK.

== Career statistics ==
As of 9 January 2019

Appearances and goals by club, season and competition
Club	Season	League			Cup		Other		Total	
Club	Season	Division	Apps	Goals	Apps	Goals	Apps	Goals	Apps	Goals
Naval	2014–15	Campeonato Nacional de Seniores	9	2	0	0	0	0	9	2
Moura	2014–15	Campeonato Nacional de Seniores	13	2	0	0	0	0	13	2
Moura	2015–16	Campeonato de Portugal	19	1	1 (Note: Appearances in the Taça de Portugal)	0	0	0	20	2
Moura	2016–17	Campeonato de Portugal	28	0	0	0	0	0	28	0
Moura	Total		60	3	1	0	0	0	61	0
Sintrense	2017–18	Campeonato de Portugal	13	0	3	0	0	0	16	0
Pinhalnovense	2017–18	Campeonato de Portugal	12	1	0	0	0	0	12	1
Académico Viseu	2018–19	LigaPro	15	1	1 (Note: Appearances in the Taça da Liga)	0	0	0	16	1
Career total			109	7	5	0	0	0	114	7
