= List of Qarabağ FK seasons =

This is a list of seasons played by Qarabağ Futbol Klubu in USSR, Azerbaijan and European football, from 1951 to the most recent completed season. It details the club's achievements in major competitions, and the top scorers for some season.

== Soviet Union (1951–1991) ==
Soviet Union (1951–1991)
Season	League									Cup	Top scorer(s) (Note: Only includes goals scored in league)		Head coach
Season	Division	Pld	W	D	L	GF	GA	Pts	Pos.	Cup	Player(s)	Goals	Head coach
1951-1965 No participation
1966	Azerbaijan SSR League	Unknown							4	Unknown			
1967	Azerbaijan SSR League	Unknown											(Soviet Union) Nadir Khudabakhshiyev
1968	Azerbaijan SSR League	Unknown											
1969	Azerbaijan SSR League	Unknown							2	Unknown			
1970-1976 No participation
1977-1980 Unknown
1981	Azerbaijan SSR League	Unknown							3	Unknown			
1982	Azerbaijan SSR League	Unknown											
1983	Azerbaijan SSR League	34	10	10	14	46	50	30	11		Unknown		
1984	Azerbaijan SSR League	34	14	4	16	41	55	32	8		Unknown		
1985	Azerbaijan SSR League	36	18	2	16	62	61	38	8		Unknown		
1986	Azerbaijan SSR League	Unknown											
1987	Azerbaijan SSR League	34	16	2	16	49	56	34	9		Unknown		(Soviet Union) Adil Nadirov
1988	Azerbaijan SSR League	32	20	7	5	63	22	47	1		Unknown		(Soviet Union) Elbrus Abbasov
1989	Soviet Second League	42	18	7	17	51	72	43	11		(Soviet Union) Javanshir Novruzov	20	(Soviet Union) Rashid Ozbeyov
1990	Soviet Second League B (group stage)	22	17	4	1	60	12	38	1	W	Unknown		(Soviet Union) Elbrus Abbasov
1990	Soviet Second League B (final stage)	34	25	7	2	79	18	57	1	W	(Soviet Union) Yashar Huseynov	17	(Soviet Union) Elbrus Abbasov
1991	Soviet Second League	42	20	2	20	20	47	42	11		(Soviet Union) Mehman Alishanov	5	(Soviet Union) Agaselim Mirjavadov

== Azerbaijan (1992–present) ==
Azerbaijan (1992–present)
Season	League									Cup	Europe		Top scorer(s) (Note: Only includes goals scored in league)		Head coach
Season	Division	Pld	W	D	L	GF	GA	Pts	Pos.	Cup	Europe		Player(s)	Goals	Head coach
1992	Top League	36	24	7	5	76	26	55	4	—	—		(Azerbaijan) Mahir Aliyev (Azerbaijan) Mehman Alishanov	9	(Azerbaijan) Nazim Mehraliyev
1993	Top League	18	9	7	2	23	11	25	1	W	—		(Azerbaijan) Mushfig Huseynov	6	(Azerbaijan) Agaselim Mirjavadov
1993–94	Top League	30	21	7	2	52	12	49	2	SF	—		(Azerbaijan) Mushfig Huseynov	17	(Azerbaijan) Agaselim Mirjavadov
1994–95	Top League	24	13	6	5	42	31	32	4	FR	—		(Azerbaijan) Mushfig Huseynov	14	(Azerbaijan) Agaselim Mirjavadov (Azerbaijan) Boyukagha Aghayev
1995–96	Top League	20	4	9	7	25	26	21	5	RU	—		(Azerbaijan) Mushfig Huseynov (Azerbaijan) Tarlan Ahmadov	9	(Azerbaijan) Agaselim Mirjavadov
1996–97	Top League	30	23	2	5	61	25	71	2	SF	Cup Winners' Cup	Qual.	(Azerbaijan) Nazim Aliyev	17	(Azerbaijan) Elbrus Abbasov
1997–98	Top League	26	14	7	5	43	22	49	4	RU	UEFA Cup	Qual.	(Azerbaijan) Mushfig Huseynov (Azerbaijan) Yalchin Baghirov	10	(Azerbaijan) Javanshir Novruzov
1998–99	Top League	36	20	6	10	50	29	66	4	FR	Cup Winners' Cup	Qual.	(Azerbaijan) Yalchin Baghirov	16	(Azerbaijan) Agaselim Mirjavadov
1999–00	Top League	22	5	10	7	21	25	25	8	RU	Intertoto Cup	R2	(Azerbaijan) Yalchin Baghirov	7	(Azerbaijan) Boyukagha Aghayev (Azerbaijan) Nazim Mehraliyev
2000–01	Top League	20	5	4	11	19	34	19	9	FR	—		(Azerbaijan) Kanan Karimov	3	(Azerbaijan) Elbrus Abbasov (Azerbaijan) Elshad Ahmadov
2001–02	Top League (Note: The AFFA and the clubs were discontinued due to the conflict between the clubs and the results were not taken into account.)	32	16	3	13	50	44	51	3	FR	—		(Russia) Dmitriy Kudinov	13	(Azerbaijan) Shahin Diniyev
2002-2003 No league championship was held
2003–04	Top League	26	19	3	4	63	17	60	3	SF	—		(Azerbaijan) Samir Musayev	20	(Azerbaijan) Shahin Diniyev
2004–05	Top League	34	22	5	7	61	31	71	6	FR	UEFA Cup	Qual.	(Azerbaijan) Vadim Vasilyev	12	(Azerbaijan) Igor Ponomaryov
2005–06	Top League	26	12	4	10	32	32	40	5	W	—		(Azerbaijan) Samir Musayev	10	(Azerbaijan) Elkhan Abdullayev (Azerbaijan) Boyukagha Aghayev
2006–07	Top League	24	6	9	9	20	27	27	8	FR	UEFA Cup	Qual.	(Azerbaijan) Vagif Javadov (Azerbaijan) Kanan Karimov	4	(Azerbaijan) Boyukagha Aghayev (Turkey) Rasim Kara
2007–08	Premier League	26	11	8	7	25	16	41	5	QF	—		(Azerbaijan) Vagif Javadov	6	(Turkey) Rasim Kara
2008–09	Premier League	26	14	7	5	35	22	49	5	W	—		(North Macedonia) Artim Šakiri (Bosnia and Herzegovina) Nidal Ferhatovic	7	(Azerbaijan) Gurban Gurbanov
2009–10	Premier League	42	17	18	7	37	30	69	3	QF	Europa League	PO	(Azerbaijan) Rauf Aliyev (Azerbaijan) Afran Ismayilov	5	(Azerbaijan) Gurban Gurbanov
2010–11	Premier League	32	17	7	8	41	22	58	3	FR	Europa League	PO	(Georgia (country)) Georgi Adamia	18	(Azerbaijan) Gurban Gurbanov
2011–12	Premier League	32	15	8	9	37	28	53	4	SF	Europa League	Qual.	(Georgia (country)) Georgi Adamia	7	(Azerbaijan) Gurban Gurbanov
2012–13	Premier League	32	16	11	5	43	26	59	2	SF	—		(Brazil) Richard Almeida	13	(Azerbaijan) Gurban Gurbanov
2013–14	Premier League	36	21	9	6	65	21	72	1	QF	Europa League	GS	(Brazil) Reynaldo	22	(Azerbaijan) Gurban Gurbanov
2014–15	Premier League	32	20	8	4	51	28	68	1	W	Champions League Europa League	Qual. GS	(Brazil) Reynaldo (Netherlands) Leroy George	10	(Azerbaijan) Gurban Gurbanov
2015–16	Premier League	36	26	6	4	66	21	84	1	W	Champions League Europa League	Qual. GS	(Spain) Dani Quintana	15	(Azerbaijan) Gurban Gurbanov
2016–17	Premier League	28	19	5	4	46	14	62	1	W	Champions League Europa League	Qual. GS	(South Africa) Dino Ndlovu	10	(Azerbaijan) Gurban Gurbanov
2017–18	Premier League	28	20	5	3	37	13	65	1	QF	Champions League	GS	(Azerbaijan) Mahir Madatov	8	(Azerbaijan) Gurban Gurbanov
2018–19	Premier League	27	19	6	2	62	19	63	1	SF	Champions League Europa League	Qual. GS	(Azerbaijan) Mahir Emreli	16	(Azerbaijan) Gurban Gurbanov
2019–20	Premier League	20	13	6	1	34	7	45	1	SF	Champions League Europa League	Qual. GS	(Azerbaijan) Mahir Emreli	7	(Azerbaijan) Gurban Gurbanov
2020–21	Premier League	28	16	9	3	64	18	57	2	SF	Champions League Europa League	Qual. GS	(Azerbaijan) Mahir Emreli	18	(Azerbaijan) Gurban Gurbanov
2021–22	Premier League	28	21	6	1	72	13	69	1	W	Conference League	KO	(Brazil) Kady Borges	12	(Azerbaijan) Gurban Gurbanov
2022–23	Premier League	36	28	6	2	91	25	90	1	QF	Champions League Europa League Conference League	Qual. GS KOPO	(Azerbaijan) Ramil Sheydayev	22	(Azerbaijan) Gurban Gurbanov
2023–24	Premier League	36	26	5	5	97	37	83	1	W	Champions League Europa League	Qual. 1/8	(Brazil) Juninho	20	(Azerbaijan) Gurban Gurbanov
2024–25	Premier League	36	28	5	3	86	19	89	1	RU	Champions League Europa League	Qual. GS	(Cape Verde) Leandro Andrade	15	(Azerbaijan) Gurban Gurbanov
2025–26	Premier League	33	21	6	6	71	27	69	2	SF	Champions League	1/8	(Cape Verde) Leandro Andrade	9	(Azerbaijan) Gurban Gurbanov
