= List of Qarabağ FK managers =

This is a list of all former coaches of Qarabağ FK. Current coach Gurban Gurbanov took over from Rasim Kara on the July 2008.

== Managers ==
| Name | Nat. | From | To | Honours | Refs |
|---|---|---|---|---|---|
Unknown (1951–1966)
| Nadir Khudabakhshiyev | (Soviet Union) | 1967 | | | |
| Elkhan Javadzade | (Soviet Union) | 1967 | 1968 | | |
| Tofig Akhundov | (Soviet Union) | 1969 | | | |
| Ramiz Shahmammadov | (Soviet Union) | 1969 | | | |
Unknown (1970–1975)
| Allahverdi Baghirov | (Soviet Union) | 1976 | | | |
Unknown (1977–1986)
| Adil Nadirov | (Soviet Union) | 1987 | 1988 | | |
| Elbrus Abbasov | (Soviet Union) | 1988 | | Azerbaijan SSR League | |
| Rashid Ozbeyov | (Soviet Union) | 1989 | | | |
| Elbrus Abbasov | (Soviet Union) | 1990 | | Azerbaijan SSR League • Azerbaijan SSR Cup | |
| Aghasalim Mirjavadov | (Soviet Union) | 1991 | | | |
| Nazim Mehraliyev | (Azerbaijan) | 1992 | | | |
| Aghasalim Mirjavadov | (Azerbaijan) | 1993 | 1994 | Azerbaijan Premier League • Azerbaijan Cup • Azerbaijan Supercup | |
| Boyukagha Aghayev | (Azerbaijan) | 1994 | | | |
| Aghasalim Mirjavadov | (Azerbaijan) | 1994 | 1996 | | |
| Elbrus Abbasov | (Azerbaijan) | 1996 | 1997 | | |
| Javanshir Novruzov | (Azerbaijan) | 1997 | 1998 | | |
| Aghasalim Mirjavadov | (Azerbaijan) | 1998 | 1999 | | |
| Boyukagha Aghayev | (Azerbaijan) | 1999 | | | |
| Nazim Mehraliyev | (Azerbaijan) | 2000 | | | |
| Elbrus Abbasov | (Azerbaijan) | 2000 | | | |
| Elshad Ahmadov | (Azerbaijan) | 2001 | | | |
| Shahin Diniyev | (Azerbaijan) | 2001 | 2002 | | |
"2002–2003"
| Shahin Diniyev | (Azerbaijan) | 2003 | 2004 | | |
| Igor Ponomaryov | (Azerbaijan) | 2004 | 2005 | | |
| Elkhan Abdullayev | (Azerbaijan) | 2005 | | | |
| Boyukagha Aghayev | (Azerbaijan) | 2006 | | Azerbaijan Cup | |
| Rasim Kara | (Turkey) | 2006 | 2008 | | |
| Gurban Gurbanov | (Azerbaijan) | 2008 | Current | Azerbaijan Premier League (10) • Azerbaijan Cup (4) | |
