= 2018–19 Qarabağ FK season =

Qarabağ
2018–19 season
- President: Tahir Gözal
- Manager: Gurban Gurbanov
- Stadium: Azersun Arena
- Premier League: 1st
- Azerbaijan Cup: Semi-final vs Gabala
- Champions League: Third qualifying round vs BATE Borisov
- Europa League: Group stage
- Top goalscorer: League: Mahir Emreli (16); All: Mahir Emreli (16)
Home colours	Away colours	Third colours

The Qarabağ 2018–19 season was Qarabağ's 26th Azerbaijan Premier League season, of which they were defending champions, and was their eleventh season under manager Gurban Gurbanov.

== Season overview ==
On 17 January 2019, Qarabağ announced that Dzon Delarge had been sent to train with Qarabağ-2.

=== Transfers ===
On 2 June 2018, Rahil Mammadov and Filip Ozobić both signed a three-year contract with Qarabağ. On 26 June, Qarabağ announced the signing of Abdellah Zoubir on a two-year contract from RC Lens.

On 4 July, Qarabağ announced the signing of Hannes Halldórsson on a two-year contract from Randers FC. The following day Simeon Slavchev joined Qarabağ on a three-year contract. Qarabağ announced the signing of Vagner on 6 July.

On 24 July, Dzon Delarge and Innocent Emeghara signed for Qarabağ.

On 19 December, Qarabağ announced the return of Reynaldo on a 2 1/2-year contract.

On 9 January, Qarabağ announced that they signed midfielder Hajiagha Hajili, who was on loan from Gabala, permanently on a four-year contract.

On 13 January, Joshgun Diniyev moved to Sabah FK.

== Squad ==
As of match played 11 May 2019

No.	Name	Nationality	Position	Date of birth (age)	Signed from	Signed in	Contract ends	Apps.	Goals
Goalkeepers
12	Shahrudin Mahammadaliyev	(Azerbaijan)	GK	12 June 1994 (aged 24)	Sumgayit	2015	2020	31	0
13	Vagner	(Brazil)	GK	6 June 1986 (aged 32)	Royal Excel Mouscron	2018	2020	26	0
94	Nijat Mehbaliyev	(Azerbaijan)	GK	11 September 2000 (aged 18)	Youth team	2017	2019	0	0
Defenders
4	Rahil Mammadov	(Azerbaijan)	DF	24 November 1995 (aged 23)	Sabail	2018	2021	19	1
5	Maksim Medvedev	(Azerbaijan)	DF	29 September 1989 (aged 29)	Youth team	2006	2020	397+	12+
14	Rashad Sadygov	(Azerbaijan)	DF	16 June 1982 (aged 36)	Eskişehirspor	2011	2019	301	10
30	Abbas Huseynov	(Azerbaijan)	DF	13 June 1995 (aged 23)	Inter Baku	2017	2019	30	0
52	Jakub Rzeźniczak	(Poland)	DF	26 October 1986 (aged 32)	Legia Warsaw	2017	2019	48	1
55	Badavi Huseynov	(Azerbaijan)	DF	11 July 1991 (aged 27)	Anzhi Makhachkala	2012	2020	305	3
Midfielders
2	Gara Garayev	(Azerbaijan)	MF	12 October 1992 (aged 26)	Youth team	2008	2020	320	2
6	Simeon Slavchev	(Bulgaria)	MF	25 September 1993 (aged 25)	Sporting CP	2018	2021	31	2
8	Míchel	(Spain)	MF	8 November 1985 (aged 33)	Maccabi Haifa	2015	2019	143	29
9	Araz Abdullayev	(Azerbaijan)	MF	18 April 1992 (aged 27)	loan from Panionios	2018	2020	28	4
10	Dani Quintana	(Spain)	MF	8 March 1987 (aged 32)	Al-Ahli	2015	2020	128	38
17	Abdellah Zoubir	(France)	MF	5 December 1991 (aged 27)	RC Lens	2018	2020	41	8
18	Ismayil Ibrahimli	(Azerbaijan)	MF	13 February 1998 (aged 21)	MOIK Baku	2018	2019	3	0
19	Filip Ozobić	(Croatia)	MF	8 April 1991 (aged 28)	Gabala	2018	2021	44	10
20	Richard	(Azerbaijan)	MF	20 March 1989 (aged 30)	loan from Astana	2019		255	54
21	Hajiagha Hajili	(Azerbaijan)	MF	30 January 1998 (aged 21)	Gabala	2019	2023	4	0
77	Wilde-Donald Guerrier	(Haiti)	MF	31 March 1989 (aged 30)	Alanyaspor	2017	2020	67	6
Forwards
7	Innocent Emeghara	(Switzerland)	FW	27 May 1989 (aged 29)	Ermis Aradippou	2018		26	10
11	Mahir Emreli	(Azerbaijan)	FW	1 July 1997 (aged 21)	Baku	2015	2020	135	39
28	Dzon Delarge	(Republic of the Congo)	FW	24 June 1990 (aged 28)	Bursaspor	2018	2020	19	3
99	Reynaldo	(Brazil)	FW	25 August 1989 (aged 29)	Aktobe	2019	2021	140	62
Away on loan
Left during the season
1	Hannes Halldórsson	(Iceland)	GK	27 April 1984 (aged 35)	Randers	2018	2020	8	0
25	Ansi Agolli	(Albania)	DF	11 October 1982 (aged 36)	Kryvbas Kryvyi Rih	2012	2019	307	4
91	Joshgun Diniyev	(Azerbaijan)	MF	13 September 1995 (aged 23)	Inter Baku	2015	2019	112	5

=== Out on loan ===
Note: Flags indicate national team as defined under FIFA eligibility rules; some limited exceptions apply. Players may hold more than one non-FIFA nationality.

No. / Pos. / Nation / Player	No. / Pos. / Nation / Player

== Transfers ==
=== In ===
Date	Position	Nationality	Name	From	Fee	Ref.
2 June 2018	DF	(Azerbaijan)	Rahil Mammadov	Sabail	Undisclosed	
2 June 2018	MF	(Croatia)	Filip Ozobić	Gabala	Free	
26 June 2018	MF	(France)	Abdellah Zoubir	RC Lens	Undisclosed	
4 July 2018	GK	(Iceland)	Hannes Halldórsson	Randers	Undisclosed	
5 July 2018	MF	(Bulgaria)	Simeon Slavchev	Sporting CP	Undisclosed	
6 July 2018	GK	(Brazil)	Vagner	Royal Excel Mouscron	Undisclosed	
24 July 2018	FW	(Republic of the Congo)	Dzon Delarge	Bursaspor	Undisclosed	
24 July 2018	FW	(Switzerland)	Innocent Emeghara	Ermis Aradippou	Undisclosed	
	MF	(Azerbaijan)	Ismayil Ibrahimli	MOIK Baku	Undisclosed	
	MF	(Azerbaijan)	Rovlan Muradov	Gabala	Undisclosed	
19 December 2018	FW	(Brazil)	Reynaldo	Aktobe	Free	
9 January 2019	MF	(Azerbaijan)	Hajiagha Hajili	Gabala	Undisclosed	

=== Out ===
Date	Position	Nationality	Name	To	Fee	Ref.
Summer 2018	MF	(Azerbaijan)	Ruslan Hajiyev	Sabail	Undisclosed	
13 January 2019	MF	(Azerbaijan)	Joshgun Diniyev	Sabah	Undisclosed	

=== Loans in ===
Date from	Position	Nationality	Name	From	Date to	Ref.
31 August 2018	MF	(Azerbaijan)	Araz Abdullayev	Panionios	30 June 2020	
	MF	(Azerbaijan)	Hajiagha Hajili	Gabala	9 January 2019	
12 January 2019	MF	(Azerbaijan)	Richard Almeida	Astana	31 December 2019	

=== Released ===
Date	Position	Nationality	Name	Joined	Date
28 June 2018	GK	(Ukraine)	Anton Kanibolotskiy	Miedź Legnica	16 July 2018
	FW	(Ukraine)	Yaroslav Deda	Karpaty Lviv	
16 March 2019	DF	(Albania)	Ansi Agolli	New York Cosmos	25 March 2019
5 April 2019	GK	(Iceland)	Hannes Þór Halldórsson	Valur	9 April 2019
13 May 2019	DF	(Poland)	Jakub Rzeźniczak	Wisła Płock	11 June 2019
13 May 2019	FW	(Brazil)	Reynaldo	Irtysh Pavlodar	4 July 2019
13 May 2019	FW	(Switzerland)	Innocent Emeghara	Fatih Karagümrük	

== Friendlies ==
23 June 2018	Ludogorets Razgrad (Bulgaria)	1 – 1	(Azerbaijan) Qarabağ	Austria
AZT (UTC+4)	36'; (penalty missed) 68'	Report	Quintana

26 June 2018	Wacker Innsbruck (Austria)	0 – 0	(Azerbaijan) Qarabağ	Austria
AZT (UTC+4)		Report

30 June 2018	Syria	1 – 0	(Azerbaijan) Qarabağ	Austria
AZT (UTC+4)	Goal	Report

4 July 2018	Dynamo Kyiv (Ukraine)	1 – 0	(Azerbaijan) Qarabağ	Austria
AZT (UTC+4)	Tsyhankov 14'	Report

12 January 2019	Qarabağ (Azerbaijan)	v	(Romania) Botoșani	Antalya, Turkey
AZST (UTC+4)
Note: match cancelled due to heavy rain in Antalya.

16 January 2019	Qarabağ (Azerbaijan)	0 – 1	(Hungary) Újpest	Antalya, Turkey
AZST (UTC+4)		Report	Goal

19 January 2019	Qarabağ (Azerbaijan)	3 – 1	(Czech Republic) Bohemians 1905	Antalya, Turkey
AZST (UTC+4)	Ozobić 36'; Guerrier 62'	Report	Nečas 16'

23 January 2019	Qarabağ (Azerbaijan)	1 – 1	(Poland) Piast Gliwice	Antalya, Turkey
AZST (UTC+4)	Abdullayev 15'	Report	9'

26 January 2019	Qarabağ (Azerbaijan)	1 – 3	(Ukraine) Shakhtar Donetsk	Antalya, Turkey
AZST (UTC+4)	Zoubir 64'	Report	26'; 45'; 74'

== Competitions ==
=== Azerbaijan Premier League ===
==== Results summary ====
Overall								Home						Away					
Pld	W	D	L	GF	GA	GD	Pts	W	D	L	GF	GA	GD	W	D	L	GF	GA	GD
28	20	6	2	62	21	+41	66	9	4	1	27	11	+16	11	2	1	35	10	+25

Last updated: 11 May 2019.
Source: See Results

==== Results ====
18 August 2018 2	Sabail	0 – 2	Qarabağ	Baku
18:30 AZT (UTC+4)	E.Balayev (yellow card) 4'; Koubemba (yellow card) 36'; Pacheco (yellow card) 83'	Report	Emreli 27', 86'	Stadium: Bayil Arena; Attendance: 1,050; Referee: Ramil Diniyev

26 August 2018 3	Qarabağ	1 – 1	Neftchi Baku	Baku
20:30 AZT (UTC+4)	Emeghara 70'; Emreli (yellow card) 84'	Report	Karikari 28'	Stadium: Azersun Arena; Attendance: 3,000; Referee: Aliyar Ağayev

14 September 2018 4	Qarabağ	1 – 0	Sumgayit	Baku
20:00 AZT (UTC+4)	Ozobić 21' (pen.); Rzeźniczak (yellow card) 29'; Agolli (yellow card) 90+1'	Report	Y.Nabiyev (yellow card) 21'	Stadium: Azersun Arena; Attendance: 1,600; Referee: Ingilab Məmmədov

23 September 2018 5	Qarabağ	4 – 1	Gabala	Baku
20:30 AZT (UTC+4)	Zoubir 30', 73'; Abdullayev 45+1'; Delarge 61'; Garayev (yellow card) 89'; Rzeźniczak (yellow card) 90+2'; Sadygov (yellow card) 90+2'	Report	Stanković (yellow card) 45'; Abbasov (yellow card) 86'; Ramaldanov 90'; Khalilzade (red card) 90+2'	Stadium: Azersun Arena; Attendance: 2,300; Referee: Aliyar Ağayev

26 September 2018 1	Qarabağ	3 – 2	Zira	Baku
20:00 AZT (UTC+4)	Ozobić 28' (pen.); Emeghara 48', 85'; Zoubir (yellow card) 73'	Report	Dedov (yellow card) 28'; M.Abbasov 56', 82'; Naghiyev (yellow card) 89'	Stadium: Azersun Arena; Attendance: 700; Referee: Ramil Diniyev

29 September 2018 6	Sabah	0 – 2	Qarabağ	Masazır
20:50 AZT (UTC+4)	Ramos (yellow card) 14'	Report	Ozobić (yellow card) 25'; Zoubir (yellow card) 78'; Míchel 82'; Emeghara 89'	Stadium: Alinja Arena; Attendance: 4,500; Referee: Rahim Həsənov

20 October 2018 8	Qarabağ	0 – 3	Sabail	Baku
19:00 AZT (UTC+4)	Zoubir (yellow card) 41' (goal) 62'; Mahammadaliyev (yellow card) 80'	Report	Cociuc (yellow card) 54'	Stadium: Azersun Arena; Attendance: 1,100; Referee: Ravan Həmzəzadə
Note: Match awarded as a 3-0 victory to Sabail.

28 October 2018 9	Neftchi Baku	3 – 1	Qarabağ	Baku
17:00 AZT (UTC+4)	Huseynov 10' (o.g.); Akhundov (yellow card) 19'; M.Abbasov 26'; Mustivar (yellow card) 42'; Buludov (yellow card) 50'; Petrov (yellow card) 77'; Dabo 87' (yellow card) 90'	Report	Huseynov (yellow card) 13'; Emreli (yellow card) 56' (goal) 87'; Sadygov (yellow card) 66'; Huseynov (yellow card) 79'	Stadium: Bakcell Arena; Attendance: 4,000; Referee: Aliyar Ağayev

31 October 2018 7	Keşla	1 – 1	Qarabağ	Baku
19 AZT (UTC+4)	Ayité (yellow card) 30'; S.Tashkin 78'; Masimov (yellow card) 87' (yellow-red card) 88'; Yunanov (yellow card) 90+1'	Report	Sadygov (yellow card) 34'; Míchel 56'; Emreli (yellow card) 75'; Rzeźniczak (yellow card) 90+1'	Stadium: ASK Arena; Attendance: 1,000; Referee: Rahim Həsənov
Note: Match original scheduled for 6 October, but moved to 31 October to assist the Azerbaijan national football team.

3 November 2018 10	Qarabağ	2 – 0	Sumgayit	Baku
19:00 AZT (UTC+4)	Slavchev 25'; Delarge 57'	Report	B.Hasanalizade (yellow card) 65'; S.Aliyev (yellow card) 75'; Dashdemirov (yellow card) 79'	Stadium: Tofiq Bahramov Republican Stadium; Attendance: 300; Referee: Vugar Həsənli

11 November 2018 11	Gabala	1 – 3	Qarabağ	Qabala
17:30 AZST (UTC+4)	Adeniyi 31' (yellow card) 39'; E.Jamalov (yellow card) 50'	Report	Emeghara 47'; Míchel 65'; Ozobić 68'	Stadium: Gabala City Stadium; Attendance: 800; Referee: Rauf Jabbarov

24 November 2018 12	Qarabağ	1 – 1	Sabah	Baku
19:00 AZT (UTC+4)	Rzeźniczak 45+1' (yellow card) 60'; Abdullayev (yellow card) 45+1'; Ozobić (yellow card) 90+5'	Report	E.Nabiyev 44'; Wanderson (yellow card) 59'; N.Mammadov (yellow card) 60'; Ramos (yellow card) 81'	Stadium: Tofiq Bahramov Republican Stadium; Attendance: 700; Referee: Ingilab Məmmədov

3 December 2018 13	Qarabağ	5 – 1	Keşla	Baku
19:00 AZT (UTC+4)	Emreli 6', 53', 77'; Ozobić 50'; Zoubir 55'	Report	D.Karimi (yellow card) 16'; S.Alkhasov 21' (yellow card) 85'; T.Guliyev (yellow card) 26'; Mitrović (yellow card) 58'; Javadov (yellow card) 83'	Stadium: Tofiq Bahramov Republican Stadium; Attendance: 500; Referee: Alik Yunusov

9 December 2018 14	Zira	0 – 6	Qarabağ	Baku
17:00 AZT (UTC+4)	Qirtimov (yellow card) 54'; Nasirov (yellow card) 56'; Radivojević (yellow card) 88'	Report	Garayev (yellow card) 12'; Quintana 29', 34', 57'; Emreli 42'; Míchel 82'; Qirtimov 90+2'	Stadium: Dalga Arena; Attendance: 400; Referee: Aliyar Ağayev

3 February 2019 15	Qarabağ	1 – 1	Neftchi Baku	Baku
18:30 AZT (UTC+4)	Quintana 6'; Emreli (yellow card) 32'; Garayev (yellow card) 90' (yellow-red card) 90+2'	Report	Mbodj (yellow card) 28' (goal) 30'; Dabo (yellow card) 35'; A.Krivotsyuk (yellow card) 50' (yellow-red card) 70'	Stadium: Tofiq Bahramov Republican Stadium; Attendance: 6,000; Referee: Ravan Həmzəzadə

9 February 2019 16	Sumgayit	0 – 2	Qarabağ	Sumqayit
18:30 AZT (UTC+4)	K.Najafov (yellow card) 23'; E.Babayev (yellow card) 45+1'; Ismayilov (yellow card) 69'; E.Shahverdiyev (yellow card) 78'; Isayev (yellow card) 90'	Report	Ozobić 20' (yellow card) 57'; H.Hajili (yellow card) 29'; Richard (yellow card) 54'; Guerrier (yellow card) 69'; Huseynov 81'	Stadium: Kapital Bank Arena; Attendance: 1,500; Referee: Orkhan Məmmədov

17 February 2019 17	Qarabağ	2 – 1	Gabala	Baku
17:30 AZST (UTC+4)	Richard 4' (pen.); Quintana (yellow card) 25'; Huseynov (yellow card) 28'; Ozobić 30'; H.Hajili (yellow card) 45+3'	Report	Huseynov 29' (pen.) (yellow card) 76'; E.Jamalov (yellow card) 39'	Stadium: Tofiq Bahramov Republican Stadium; Attendance: 2,00; Referee: Rahim Həsənov

23 February 2019 18	Sabah	1 – 1	Qarabağ	Masazır
16:30 AZT (UTC+4)	Diniyev (yellow card) 1'; E.Turabov (yellow card) 7'; Ramos (yellow card) 7' (yellow-red card) 78'; M.Isayev (yellow card) 24'; Khalilzade (yellow card) 47'; Eyyubov (yellow card) 70'	Report	Reynaldo 19' (yellow card) 34'; Emreli (yellow card) 25'; Huseynov (yellow card) 87'	Stadium: Alinja Arena; Attendance: 1,700; Referee: İnqilab Mammadov

3 March 2019 19	Keşla	0 – 1	Qarabağ	Baku
17:30 AZT (UTC+4)	Yunanov (yellow card) 39'; Kamara (yellow card) 47'	Report	Abdullayev 16'	Stadium: ASK Arena; Attendance: 900; Referee: Orkhan Məmmədov

9 March 2019 20	Qarabağ	0 – 0	Zira	Baku
18:30 AZT (UTC+4)	Emreli (yellow card) 84'	Report	Mutallimov (yellow card) 56'; Nasirov (yellow card) 83'	Stadium: Tofiq Bahramov Republican Stadium; Attendance: 700; Referee: Rauf Jabbarov

15 March 2019 21	Sabail	1 – 2	Qarabağ	Baku
16:45 AZT (UTC+4)	Kitanovski (yellow card) 31'; Cociuc (yellow card) 40'; Ramazanov 42'	Report	Quintana 34'; Guerrier (yellow card) 59'; Richard 77' (pen.)	Stadium: Bayil Arena; Attendance: 800; Referee: Aliyar Ağayev

1 April 2019 22	Sumgayit	0 – 6	Qarabağ	Sumqayit
18:30 AZT (UTC+4)	S.Aliyev (yellow card) 82'	Report	Quintana 17'; Emreli 21', 40'; Míchel (yellow card) 35'; Ozobić 51'; Zoubir 78', 84'	Stadium: Kapital Bank Arena; Attendance: 2,000; Referee: Ravan Həmzəzadə

7 April 2019 23	Gabala	1 – 2	Qarabağ	Qabala
14:00 AZT (UTC+4)	Aliyev 23' (yellow card) 75'; Volkovi (yellow card) 24'; Stanković (yellow card) 26'	Report	Guerrier 3' (yellow card) 67'; Huseynov (yellow card) 58'; Abdullayev 83'	Stadium: Gabala City Stadium; Attendance: 1,600; Referee: Sabuhi Bayramov

13 April 2019 24	Qarabağ	3 – 0	Sabah	Baku
18:30 AZT (UTC+4)	Ozobić (yellow card) 6' (goal) 65'; Richard 10'; Míchel (yellow card) 22'; Emreli (yellow card) 44' (goal) 77'; Guerrier (yellow card) 90+2'	Report	M.Isayev (yellow card) 41'; V.Abdullayev (yellow card) 44'; E.Nabiyev (yellow card) 62'	Stadium: Tofiq Bahramov Republican Stadium; Attendance: 500; Referee: Ingilab Məmmədov

18 April 2019 24	Qarabağ	3 – 0	Keşla	Baku
19:00 AZT (UTC+4)	Slavchev 18'; Quintana (yellow card) 29'; Richard 59' (pen.); Zoubir 75'	Report	Kamara (yellow card) 13'; Kutsenko (yellow card) 67'	Stadium: Tofiq Bahramov Republican Stadium; Attendance: 500; Referee: Aliyar Ağayev

27 April 2019 25	Zira	0 – 3	Qarabağ	Zirə
16:30 AZT (UTC+4)	B.Hasanalizade (yellow card) 49'; M.Musayev (yellow card) 52'; Kgaswane (yellow card) 65'; Mustafayev (yellow card) 69'	Report	Quintana 21'; Ozobić 28'; Slavchev (yellow card) 72'; Zoubir (yellow card) 73'; Emreli 79'	Stadium: Zira Olympic Sport Complex Stadium; Attendance: 600; Referee: Sabuhi Bayramov

5 May 2019 27	Qarabağ	4 – 0	Sabail	Baku
18:00 AZT (UTC+4)	Míchel 21'; Emreli 41', 69', 87'; B.Huseynov (yellow card) 49'; Ozobić (yellow card) 63'; Garayev (yellow card) 90+1'; Slavchev (yellow card) 90+3'	Report		Stadium: Tofiq Bahramov Republican Stadium; Attendance: 3,500; Referee: Rövşən Rəcəbov

11 May 2019 28	Neftchi Baku	2 – 3	Qarabağ	Baku
18:00 AZT (UTC+4)	Sansone (yellow card) 21' (goal) 40'; Mahmudov 38' (pen.); Buludov (yellow card) 48'; Abışov (yellow card) 90+4'	Report	Emreli 15', 64' (yellow card) 42'; Garayev (yellow card) 18'; Míchel (yellow card) 37'; Sadygov (yellow card) 42'; Richard (yellow card) 44' (goal) 90'; Medvedev (yellow card) 52'	Stadium: Bakcell Arena; Attendance: 5,000; Referee: Kamal Umudlu

==== League table ====
Pos	Team	Pld	W	D	L	GF	GA	GD	Pts	Qualification or relegation
1	Qarabağ (C)	28	20	6	2	65	21	+44	66	Qualification for the Champions League first qualifying round
2	Neftçi Baku	28	17	7	4	52	26	+26	58	Qualification for the Europa League first qualifying round
3	Sabail	28	12	5	11	34	37	−3	41	Qualification for the Europa League first qualifying round
4	Gabala	28	9	9	10	31	33	−2	36	Qualification for the Europa League second qualifying round
5	Zira	28	8	7	13	30	40	−10	31	

Source: Soccerway
Rules for classification: 1) Points; 2) Head-to-head points; 3) Head-to-head goal difference; 4) Head-to-head goals scored; 5) Head-to-head away goals scored (only if two teams); 6) Goal difference; 7) Goals scored.
(C) Champions

=== Azerbaijan Cup ===
16 December 2018 Quarterfinal 1st leg	Qarabağ	1 – 0	Keşla	Baku
19:00 AZT (UTC+4)	Quintana (yellow card) 43'; Mammadov 65'	Report	Ayité (yellow card) 33'; Guliyev (yellow card) 90+4'; S.Tashkin (yellow card) 90+4'	Stadium: Tofiq Bahramov Republican Stadium; Attendance: 400; Referee: Vugar Həsənli

20 December 2018 Quarterfinal 2nd leg	Keşla	1 – 1 (1 – 2 agg.)	Qarabağ	Baku
19:00 AZT (UTC+4)	Yunanov 29'; S.Alkhasov (yellow card) 55'; S.Əsədov (yellow card) 71'	Report	Emreli (yellow card) 22'; Sadygov (yellow card) 36'; Agolli (yellow card) 36'; Míchel 48' (yellow card) 72'; Rzeźniczak (yellow card) 53' (yellow-red card) 89'; Medvedev (yellow card) 62'; Ozobić (yellow card) 78'	Stadium: ASK Arena; Attendance: 600; Referee: Ingilab Mammadov

23 April 2019 Semifinal 1st leg	Gabala	1 – 0	Qarabağ	Qabala
16:00 AZT (UTC+4)	A.Seydiyev (yellow card) 29'; Joseph-Monrose (yellow card) 39'; Adeniyi 72'; Lilaj (yellow card) 85'; Aliyev (yellow card) 87'	Report	Emreli (yellow card) 35'; Zoubir (yellow card) 84'	Stadium: Gabala City Stadium; Attendance: 1,800; Referee: Vugar Hasanli

1 May 2019 Semifinal 2nd leg	Qarabağ	2 – 1 (2 – 2 a agg.)	Gabala	Baku
17:00 AZT (UTC+4)	Emreli (yellow card) 30'; Míchel 37' (red card) 90+5'; Quintana 58'	Report	Huseynov (yellow card) 20'; Stanković (yellow card) 49'; A.Seydiyev (yellow card) 65'; Volkovi 82'; Lilaj (yellow card) 83'; Atakora (yellow card) 85'; Nazirov (yellow card) 90+1'	Stadium: Tofiq Bahramov Republican Stadium; Attendance: 2,000; Referee: İnqilab Məmmədov

=== UEFA Champions League ===
==== Qualifying rounds ====
11 July 2018 First qualifying round 1st leg	Olimpija Ljubljana (Slovenia)	0 – 1	(Azerbaijan) Qarabağ	Ljubljana, Slovenia
21:00 AZT (UTC+4)	Putinčanin (yellow card) 24'; Issah (red card) 85'	Report	Garayev (yellow card) 31' (yellow-red card) 90+1'; Guerrier (yellow card) 73' (goal) 79'; Huseynov (yellow card) 85'	Stadium: Stožice Stadium; Attendance: 5,248; Referee: Lawrence Visser (Belgium)

18 July 2018 First qualifying round 2nd leg	Qarabağ (Azerbaijan)	0 – 0 (1 – 0 agg.)	(Slovenia) Olimpija Ljubljana	Baku, Azerbaijan
20:00 AZT (UTC+4)	Medvedev (yellow card) 87'; Rzeźniczak (yellow card) 90+3'	Report	Boateng (yellow card) 5'; Putinčanin (yellow card) 85'; Gajić (yellow card) 86' (yellow-red card) 90+6'; Črnic (yellow card) 90+2'	Stadium: Tofiq Bahramov Republican Stadium; Attendance: 21,520; Referee: Erez Papir (Israel)
Note: Qarabağ played their home matches at the Tofiq Bahramov Republican Stadium, Baku, instead of their regular stadium Azersun Arena, Baku

25 July 2018 Second qualifying round 1st leg	Kukësi (Albania)	0 – 0	(Azerbaijan) Qarabağ	Shkodër, Albania
21:00 AZT (UTC+4)		Report		Stadium: Loro Boriçi Stadium; Attendance: 700; Referee: Ola Hobber Nilsen (Norway)
Note: Kukësi played their home matches at Loro Boriçi Stadium, Shkodër, instead of their regular stadium Zeqir Ymeri Stadium, Kukës

1 August 2018 Second qualifying round 2nd leg	Qarabağ (Azerbaijan)	3 – 0 (3 – 0 agg.)	(Albania) Kukësi	Baku, Azerbaijan
20:00 AZT (UTC+4)	Slavchev (yellow card) 15'; Quintana 24' (pen.), 57' (pen.); Delarge 89'	Report	Shameti (yellow card) 18'; Alla (red card) 52'; Malikji (yellow card) 56'	Stadium: Tofiq Bahramov Republican Stadium; Attendance: 25,030; Referee: Peter Kráľovič (Slovakia)
Note: Qarabağ played their home matches at the Tofiq Bahramov Republican Stadium, Baku, instead of their regular stadium Azersun Arena, Baku

7 August 2018 Third qualifying round 1st leg	Qarabağ (Azerbaijan)	0 – 1	(Belarus) BATE Borisov	Baku, Azerbaijan
20:00 AZT (UTC+4)		Report	Drahun 36'; Rios (yellow card) 44'; Signevich (yellow card) 54'; Filipović (yellow card) 56'	Stadium: Tofiq Bahramov Republican Stadium; Attendance: 29,000; Referee: Andreas Ekberg (Sweden)
Note: Qarabağ played their home matches at the Tofiq Bahramov Republican Stadium, Baku, instead of their regular stadium Azersun Arena, Baku

14 August 2018 Third qualifying round 2nd leg	BATE Borisov (Belarus)	1 – 1 (2 – 1 agg.)	(Azerbaijan) Qarabağ	Barysaw, Belarus
21:00 AZT (UTC+4)	Ivanić 20'; Scherbitskiy (yellow card) 90+3'	Report	Emeghara (yellow card) 32' (yellow-red card) 77'; Garayev (yellow card) 39'; Míchel 54'; Slavchev (yellow card) 62'; Sadygov (yellow card) 81'	Stadium: Borisov Arena; Attendance: 12,489; Referee: Andris Treimanis (Latvia)

=== UEFA Europa League ===
==== Qualifying rounds ====
23 August 2018 Playoff round 1st leg	Sheriff Tiraspol (Moldova)	1 – 0	(Azerbaijan) Qarabağ	Tiraspol, Moldova
21:00 AZT (UTC+4)	Kapić 8'; Kendysh (yellow card) 30'	Report	Garayev (yellow card) 46'; Ozobić (yellow card) 79'	Stadium: Sheriff Stadium; Attendance: 5,073; Referee: Harald Lechner (Austria)

30 August 2018 Playoff round 2nd leg	Qarabağ (Azerbaijan)	3 – 0 (3 – 1 agg.)	(Moldova) Sheriff Tiraspol	Baku, Azerbaijan
20:00 AZT (UTC+4)	Medvedev 9'; Slavchev (yellow card) 34'; Guerrier 42'; Ozobić 55'; Garayev (yellow card) 90+3'	Report	Boiciuc (yellow card) 24'; Racu (yellow card) 31'; Kovačević (yellow card) 34'; Jô Santos (yellow card) 47'; Sušić (yellow card) 83'; Rodrigues (yellow card) 90+1'	Stadium: Tofiq Bahramov Republican Stadium; Attendance: 21,350; Referee: Aleksandar Stavrev (Macedonia)
Note: Qarabağ played their home matches at the Tofiq Bahramov Republican Stadium, Baku, instead of their regular stadium Azersun Arena, Baku

==== Group stage ====
Pos	Team	Pld	W	D	L	GF	GA	GD	Pts	Qualification
1	(England) Arsenal	6	5	1	0	12	2	+10	16	Advance to knockout phase
2	(Portugal) Sporting CP	6	4	1	1	13	3	+10	13	Advance to knockout phase
3	(Ukraine) Vorskla Poltava	6	1	0	5	4	13	−9	3 (Note: Goal difference in all group matches: Vorskla Poltava –9, Qarabağ –11.)	
4	(Azerbaijan) Qarabağ	6	1	0	5	2	13	−11	3	

Source: UEFA
Rules for classification: Group stage tiebreakers
Notes:

20 September 2018 1	Sporting CP (Portugal)	2 – 0	(Azerbaijan) Qarabağ	Lisbon, Portugal
23:00 AZT (UTC+4)	Raphinha 54'; Cabral 88'	Report	Emreli (yellow card) 33'	Stadium: Estádio José Alvalade; Attendance: 30,098; Referee: François Letexier (France)

4 October 2018 2	Qarabağ (Azerbaijan)	0 – 3	(England) Arsenal	Baku, Azerbaijan
20:55 AZT (UTC+4)	Medvedev (yellow card) 33'	Report	Papastathopoulos 4'; Holding (yellow card) 43'; Rowe 53'; Guendouzi 80'	Stadium: Olympic Stadium; Attendance: 63,412; Referee: Davide Massa
Note: Qarabağ played their home matches at the Olympic Stadium, Baku, instead of their regular stadium Azersun Arena, Baku

25 October 2018 3	Qarabağ (Azerbaijan)	0 – 1	(Ukraine) Vorskla Poltava	Baku, Azerbaijan
20:55 AZT (UTC+4)	Zoubir (yellow card) 64'	Report	Kulach (yellow card) 4' (goal) 48'; Perduta (yellow card) 41'; Dallku (yellow card) 79'; Serhiychuk (yellow card) 87'	Stadium: Olympic Stadium; Attendance: 22,450; Referee: Roi Reinshreiber (Israel)
Note: Qarabağ played their home matches at the Olympic Stadium, Baku, instead of their regular stadium Azersun Arena, Baku

9 November 2018 4	Vorskla Poltava (Ukraine)	0 – 1	(Azerbaijan) Qarabağ	Poltava, Ukraine
00:00 AZT (UTC+4)	Yakubu (yellow card) 52'; Sklyar (yellow card) 63'; Chyzhov (yellow card) 80'; Sharpar (yellow card) 90+5'	Report	Abdullayev 13' (pen.); Guerrier (yellow card) 34'; Medvedev (yellow card) 56'	Stadium: Oleksiy Butovsky Vorskla Stadium; Attendance: 5,479; Referee: Sandro Schärer (Switzerland)

29 November 2018 5	Qarabağ (Azerbaijan)	1 – 6	(Portugal) Sporting CP	Baku, Azerbaijan
21:55 AZT (UTC+4)	Rzeźniczak (yellow card) 4'; Guerrier (yellow card) 4'; Zoubir 14'; Garayev (yellow card) 25'; Emreli (yellow card) 40'; Míchel (yellow card) 43'; Slavchev (yellow card) 49'	Report	Dost 5' (pen.); Fernandes 20', 75' (yellow card) 28'; Nani 33'; Diaby 65', 82'	Stadium: Olympic Stadium; Attendance: 5,416; Referee: Petr Ardeleanu (Czech Republic)
Note: Qarabağ played their home matches at the Olympic Stadium, Baku, instead of their regular stadium Azersun Arena, Baku

14 December 2018 6	Arsenal (England)	1 – 0	(Azerbaijan) Qarabağ	London, England
00:00 AZT (UTC+4)	Lacazette 17'	Report	Garayev (yellow card) 82'	Stadium: Emirates Stadium; Attendance: 58,101; Referee: Jens Maae (Denmark)

== Squad statistics ==
As of Match played 11 May 2019

=== Appearances and goals ===
No.	Pos	Nat	Player	Total		Premier League		Azerbaijan Cup		Champions League		Europa League	
No.	Pos	Nat	Player	Apps	Goals	Apps	Goals	Apps	Goals	Apps	Goals	Apps	Goals
2	MF	(Azerbaijan) AZE	Gara Garayev	40	0	13+11	0	2+1	0	5	0	8	0
4	DF	(Azerbaijan) AZE	Rahil Mammadov	19	1	13+2	0	3+1	1	0	0	0	0
5	DF	(Azerbaijan) AZE	Maksim Medvedev	37	1	20	0	3	0	6	0	8	1
6	MF	(Bulgaria) BUL	Simeon Slavchev	30	2	6+9	2	2	0	5+1	0	6+1	0
7	FW	(Switzerland) SUI	Innocent Emeghara	17	5	8+2	5	0	0	3	0	4	0
8	MF	(Spain) ESP	Míchel	36	8	15+5	5	3	2	6	1	6+1	0
9	MF	(Azerbaijan) AZE	Araz Abdullayev	28	3	7+11	2	3+1	0	0	0	3+3	1
10	MF	(Spain) ESP	Dani Quintana	23	10	16+1	7	2	1	2+1	2	0+1	0
11	FW	(Azerbaijan) AZE	Mahir Emreli	45	16	22+5	16	4	0	4+2	0	6+2	0
12	GK	(Azerbaijan) AZE	Shahrudin Mahammadaliyev	12	0	9	0	3	0	0	0	0	0
13	GK	(Brazil) BRA	Vagner	25	0	14	0	1	0	4	0	6	0
14	DF	(Azerbaijan) AZE	Rashad Sadygov	28	0	14+2	0	1	0	4+1	0	6	0
17	MF	(France) FRA	Abdellah Zoubir	41	8	20+4	7	2+2	0	5	0	7+1	1
18	MF	(Azerbaijan) AZE	Ismayil Ibrahimli	3	0	2+1	0	0	0	0	0	0	0
19	MF	(Croatia) CRO	Filip Ozobić	43	9	23+3	8	2+2	0	2+3	0	4+4	1
20	MF	(Azerbaijan) AZE	Richard	16	5	14	5	1+1	0	0	0	0	0
21	MF	(Azerbaijan) AZE	Hajiagha Hajili	3	0	3	0	0	0	0	0	0	0
28	FW	(Republic of the Congo) CGO	Dzon Delarge	19	3	6+4	2	0	0	1+2	1	2+4	0
30	DF	(Azerbaijan) AZE	Abbas Huseynov	16	0	11+1	0	1+1	0	0+1	0	0+1	0
52	DF	(Poland) POL	Jakub Rzeźniczak	21	1	11	1	1	0	2+1	0	6	0
55	DF	(Azerbaijan) AZE	Badavi Huseynov	32	0	17+1	0	3	0	6	0	5	0
77	MF	(Haiti) HAI	Wilde-Donald Guerrier	37	3	16+4	1	2+2	0	6	1	7	1
99	FW	(Brazil) BRA	Reynaldo	6	1	2+3	1	1	0	0	0	0	0
Players away on loan:
Players who left Qarabağ during the season:
1	GK	(Iceland) ISL	Hannes Halldórsson	8	0	4	0	0	0	2	0	2	0
25	DF	(Albania) ALB	Ansi Agolli	16	0	7+3	0	2	0	1+1	0	1+1	0
91	MF	(Azerbaijan) AZE	Joshgun Diniyev	13	0	7	0	2	0	2	0	1+1	0

=== Goal scorers ===
Place	Position	Nation	Number	Name	Premier League	Azerbaijan Cup	Champions League	Europa League	Total
1	FW	(Azerbaijan)	11	Mahir Emreli	16	0	0	0	16
2	MF	(Spain)	10	Dani Quintana	7	1	2	0	10
3	MF	(Croatia)	19	Filip Ozobić	8	0	0	1	9
4	MF	(France)	17	Abdellah Zoubir	7	0	0	1	8
4	MF	(Spain)	8	Míchel	5	2	1	0	8
6	FW	(Switzerland)	7	Innocent Emeghara	5	0	0	0	5
6	MF	(Azerbaijan)	20	Richard	5	0	0	0	5
8	MF	(Azerbaijan)	9	Araz Abdullayev	3	0	0	1	4
9	FW	(Republic of the Congo)	28	Dzon Delarge	2	0	1	0	3
9	MF	(Haiti)	77	Wilde-Donald Guerrier	1	0	1	1	3
11	MF	(Bulgaria)	6	Simeon Slavchev	2	0	0	0	2
12	DF	(Poland)	52	Jakub Rzeźniczak	1	0	0	0	1
12	FW	(Brazil)	99	Reynaldo	1	0	0	0	1
12	DF	(Azerbaijan)	4	Rahil Mammadov	0	1	0	0	1
12	DF	(Azerbaijan)	5	Maksim Medvedev	0	0	0	1	1
12				Own goal	1	0	0	0	1
				TOTALS	64	4	5	5	78

=== Disciplinary record ===
Number	Nation	Position	Name	Premier League		Azerbaijan Cup		Champions League		Europa League		Total	
Number	Nation	Position	Name	Yellow card	Red card	Yellow card	Red card	Yellow card	Red card	Yellow card	Red card	Yellow card	Red card
2	(Azerbaijan)	MF	Gara Garayev	6	1	0	0	2	0	4	0	12	1
5	(Azerbaijan)	DF	Maksim Medvedev	1	0	1	0	1	0	2	0	5	0
6	(Bulgaria)	MF	Simeon Slavchev	2	0	0	0	2	0	2	0	6	0
7	(Switzerland)	FW	Innocent Emeghara	0	0	0	0	2	1	0	0	2	1
8	(Spain)	MF	Míchel	3	0	1	1	0	0	1	0	5	1
9	(Azerbaijan)	MF	Araz Abdullayev	1	0	0	0	0	0	0	0	1	0
10	(Spain)	MF	Dani Quintana	2	0	1	0	0	0	0	0	3	0
11	(Azerbaijan)	FW	Mahir Emreli	8	0	3	0	0	0	2	0	13	0
12	(Azerbaijan)	GK	Shahrudin Mahammadaliyev	1	0	0	0	0	0	0	0	1	0
14	(Azerbaijan)	DF	Rashad Sadygov	4	0	1	0	1	0	0	0	6	0
17	(France)	MF	Abdellah Zoubir	4	0	1	0	0	0	1	0	6	0
19	(Croatia)	MF	Filip Ozobić	4	0	1	0	0	0	1	0	6	0
20	(Azerbaijan)	MF	Richard	1	0	0	0	0	0	0	0	1	0
21	(Azerbaijan)	MF	Hajiagha Hajili	1	0	0	0	0	0	0	0	1	0
30	(Azerbaijan)	DF	Abbas Huseynov	1	0	0	0	0	0	0	0	1	0
52	(Poland)	DF	Jakub Rzeźniczak	4	0	2	1	1	0	1	0	8	1
55	(Azerbaijan)	DF	Badavi Huseynov	5	0	0	0	1	0	0	0	6	0
77	(Haiti)	MF	Wilde-Donald Guerrier	3	0	0	0	1	0	2	0	6	0
99	(Brazil)	FW	Reynaldo	1	0	0	0	0	0	0	0	1	0
Players who left Qarabağ during the season:
25	(Albania)	DF	Ansi Agolli	1	0	1	0	0	0	0	0	2	0
			TOTALS	53	1	12	2	11	1	16	0	92	4
