= İnşaatçı Sabirabad FK =

İnşaatçı Sabirabad
- Full name: İnşaatçı Sabirabad Futbol Klubu
- Founded: 1989; 37 years ago
- Dissolved: 1995; 31 years ago
- Ground: Sabirabad
- League: Azerbaijan Top Division
- 1993: 8th

İnşaatçı Sabirabad FK (Azerbaijani: İnşaatçı Sabirabad Futbol Klubu) was an Azerbaijani football club from Sabirabad founded in 1989, as Stroitel Sabirabad, changing their name to İnşaatçı Sabirabad in 1992 before dissolving in 1995.

They participated in the Azerbaijan Top Division in 1992 and 1993, finishing 8th in their first season and 14th in their second. They were also runner-up in the 1993 Azerbaijan Cup.

It was announced that in 2025 the club would be reestablished and compete in the Amateur League.

== History ==
=== Soviet Era ===
The club was founded in 1989 under the name Stroitel Sabirabad (Russian: Строитель – builder, construction worker). The club's name was reflecting its operation under the sponsorship of several construction firms. In the same year, they participated in the Championship of the Azerbaijan SSR, becoming the winner of the tournament and earning the right to represent the Azerbaijan SSR in the Soviet Second League B. They competed in the 1990 season in the III (Azerbaijan) zone and finished 11th out of 24 teams.

=== After independence ===
In 1992, after the independence of the Republic of Azerbaijan and the start of the first national championship, the club participated in the Azerbaijan Premier League under the name "İnşaatçı," which is the Azerbaijani translation of the word “builder”.

In their debut year, 1992, İnşaatçı finished in 12th place among 26 teams. In 1993, the league regulations were changed. The teams were divided into two groups of 10 teams each. İnşaatçı was placed in Group "B" and finished in 8th place, which was not enough to remain in the Premier League, as the new rules stipulated that the bottom three teams from Groups "A" and "B" would be relegated. As a result, the club was demoted to the First League.

That same year, in 1993, the club participated in the second edition of the Azerbaijan Cup and reached the final, where they lost the title to Qarabağ Aghdam.

In 1993–94 season of the Azerbaijan Cup, the club was eliminated in the first round of the tournament.

== League and domestic cup history ==
Season	League									Azerbaijan Cup	Top goalscorer	
Season	Div.	Pos.	Pl.	W	D	L	GS	GA	P	Azerbaijan Cup	Name	League
1992	1st	6	36	14	6	16	36	42	34	-	Natiq Rzayev	11
1993	1st	8	18	5	6	7	21	22	16	Runners-up	Natiq Rzayev	6
