= Mushfig Huseynov =

Azerbaijani footballer (born 1970)

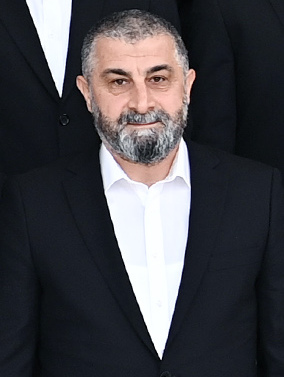
- Huseynov in 2021

Personal information
- Date of birth: 14 February 1970 (age 56)
- Place of birth: Aghdam, Soviet Union
- Height: 1.68 m (5 ft 6 in)
- Position: Striker

Senior career*
Years	Team	Apps	(Gls)
1989–1991	Qarabağ	76	(16)
1992	Smena-Saturn	4	(0)
1992–1999	Qarabağ	197	(97)
1999–2000	Kapaz	21	(7)
2000–2001	Neftchi Baku	18	(9)
2001–2002	Paykan	12	(5)
2003–2004	Qarabağ	18	(5)
2004–2005	MKT Araz	22	(0)
2005–2007	Qarabağ	29	(7)
Total		363	(141)

International career
1994–1995	Azerbaijan	2	(0)

Managerial career
- 2008–: Qarabağ (assistant)
- * Club domestic league appearances and goals

Mushfig Huseynov (Azerbaijani: Müşfiq Hüseynov, born 14 February 1970 is an Azerbaijani former professional footballer who played as a striker. He made his professional debut in 1989 for Qarabağ FK.

== Honours ==
Qarabağ

- Azerbaijan Premier League: 1993
- Azerbaijan Cup: 1993
