= Football Cup of the Azerbaijan SSR =

Azerbaijan SSR football cup

The Football Cup of the Azerbaijan SSR (Azerbaijani: Futbol üzrə Azərbaycan SSRİ kuboku) was a playoff republican competition in association football which was held in the Azerbaijan SSR from 1936 to 1991.

== Winners ==
- 1936: Stroitel Yuga Baku
- 1937: Temp Baku
- 1938: Temp Baku
- 1939: Lokomotiv Baku
- 1940: Dinamo Baku
- 1941–46: Not Played
- 1947: Pischevik Baku
- 1948: Pischevik Baku
- 1949: KKF Baku
- 1950: Trudovye Rezervy Baku
- 1951: Zavod im. S.M.Budennogo Baku
- 1952: Zavod im. S.M.Budennogo Baku
- 1953: Dinamo Baku
- 1954: BODO Baku
- 1955: Zavod im. S.M.Budennogo Baku
- 1956: NPU Ordgonikidzeneft Baku
- 1957: Mekhsul Tovuz
- 1958: SK BO PVO Baku
- 1959: Neftyannik Cuba
- 1960: ATZ Sumgait
- 1961: NPU Ordgonikidzeneft Baku
- 1962: MOIK Baku
- 1963: MOIK Baku
- 1964: Vostok Baku
- 1965: Vostok Baku
- 1966: Vostok Baku
- 1967: Apsheron Baku
- 1968: Politechnik Mingechaur
- 1969: MOIK Baku
- 1970: MOIK Baku
- 1971: Suruhanez Salyany
- 1972: Izolit Mingechaur
- 1973: MOIK Baku
- 1974: MOIK Baku
- 1975: Suruhanez Baku
- 1976: MOIK Baku
- 1977: Suruhanez Baku
- 1978: MOIK Baku
- 1979: Suruhanez Baku
- 1980: Energetik Ali-Bayramly
- 1981: Gandglik Baku
- 1982: Gandglik Baku
- 1983: FK Vilash Masalli
- 1984: Konditer Gandja
- 1985: Konditer Gandja
- 1986: İnşaatçı Sabirabad
- 1987: Khazar Lankaran
- 1988: Araz Baku
- 1989: Gandglik Baku
- 1990: Qarabağ
- 1991: İnşaatçı Baku
