= Mahir Emreli =

Azerbaijani footballer (born 1997)

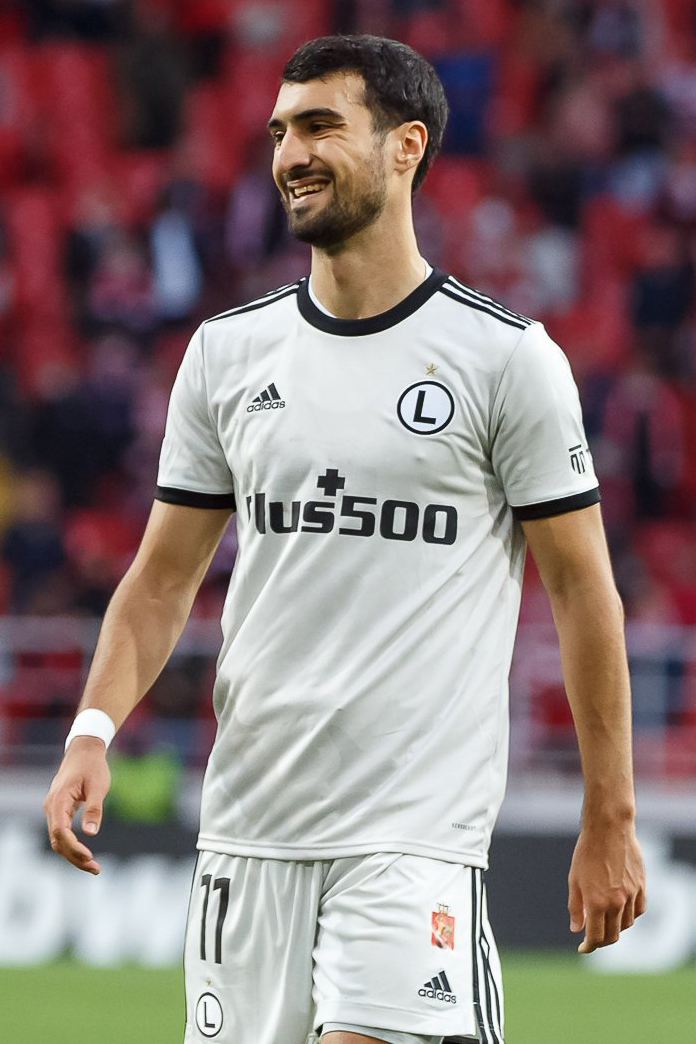
- Emreli with Legia Warsaw in 2021

Personal information
- Full name: Mahir Mahir oğlu Emreli
- Birth name: Mahir Anar oğlu Mədətov
- Date of birth: 1 July 1997 (age 29)
- Place of birth: Tver, Russia
- Height: 1.87 m (6 ft 2 in)
- Position: Forward

Team information
- Current team: Raków Częstochowa (on loan from 1. FC Kaiserslautern)
- Number: 11

Youth career
- 2006–2013: Baku

Senior career*
Years	Team	Apps	(Gls)
2014–2015	Baku	17	(0)
2015–2021	Qarabağ	185	(67)
2021–2022	Legia Warsaw	15	(2)
2022–2024	Dinamo Zagreb	32	(9)
2023	→ Konyaspor (loan)	12	(2)
2024–2025	1. FC Nürnberg	24	(10)
2025–	1. FC Kaiserslautern	12	(1)
2026–	→ Raków Częstochowa (loan)	14	(3)

International career^{‡}
2012	Azerbaijan U17	3	(0)
2014–2015	Azerbaijan U19	8	(1)
2016–2018	Azerbaijan U21	6	(3)
2017	Azerbaijan U23	5	(2)
2017–	Azerbaijan	67	(8)
Medal record
Men's football
Representing Azerbaijan
Islamic Solidarity Games
Winner	2017 Azerbaijan
- * Club domestic league appearances and goals as of 15:41, 9 November 2026 (UTC) ‡ National team caps and goals as of 23:22, 17 November 2026 (UTC)

Mahir Mahir oğlu Emreli (previously Mahir Anar oğlu Mədətov; born 1 July 1997) is an Azerbaijani professional footballer who plays as a forward for Ekstraklasa club Raków Częstochowa, on loan from 2. Bundesliga club 1. FC Kaiserslautern, and the Azerbaijan national team.

== Club career ==
Emreli made his professional debut in the Azerbaijan Premier League for FC Baku on 27 September 2014 in a game against Araz-Naxçıvan.

=== Qarabağ ===
On 16 July 2015, Emreli signed a three-year contract with Qarabağ FK.

On 23 August 2015, Mahir made his debut and scored his first goal for Qarabağ in a 2–0 away victory against Shuvalan.

Emreli made his European debut in 2016 against Luxembourgish F91 Dudelange in the second qualification round of the UEFA Champions League which ended 2–0 for Qarabağ.

On 15 September 2016, Emreli made his debut for UEFA Europa League group stage game against FC Slovan Liberec.

He scored his first European goal in a 1–0 home victory against Danish Copenhagen in the play-off round of the 2017-18 UEFA Champions League.

Emreli made his debut for UEFA Champions League group stage game against Chelsea in Stamford Bridge on 12 September 2017. Mahir made five appearances in the UEFA Champions League group stage.

On 18 August 2020, Emreli, scoring against FK Sileks at the first qualifying round of the UEFA Champions League, celebrated his goal with a salute to the Azerbaijani soldiers serving in the frontline during the border clashes with Armenia.

=== Legia Warsaw ===
On 8 June 2021, Legia Warsaw announced the signing of Emreli on a contract until 30 June 2024.

On 17 June 2021, Emreli made his debut and scored his first goal for Legia in a 5–0 friendly victory over SK Bischofshofen. He scored his first officials goals for Legia in a UEFA Champions League first qualifying round match against Norwegian champions Bodø/Glimt on 7 July 2021.

On 26 August 2021, during play-off match of the 2021–22 UEFA Europa League against Slavia Prague, following an unsuccessful 0–1 first half, Emreli scored two goals and secured Legia's qualification to the group stage of the tournament. He set a unique record by scoring in all the tournaments he participated in.

In December 2021, Emreli was one of the victims of an attack by hooligans on a bus returning after the Ekstraklasa match against Wisła Płock. After this incident, Emreli decided not to play for Legia. On 2 February 2022, he terminated the contract by mutual agreement.

=== Dinamo Zagreb ===
Hours after leaving Legia, Emreli was announced as the new player of Dinamo Zagreb in the Croatian First Football League. Legia owed Dinamo one million euros because they bought Lirim Kastrati from them in September 2021 for 1.2 million euros, but by December 2021 Dinamo had received only 200,000 euros. Dinamo decided to drop Legia's debt on the condition that Emreli would leave Legia for free and sign for Dinamo.

On 24 August 2022, Emreli played in the play-off match against FK Bodø/Glimt with Dinamo Zagreb winning 4–1 and ensuring a place in the 2022–23 UEFA Champions League group stage.

==== Loan to Konyaspor ====
On 14 February 2023, Emreli was loaned to Süper Lig club Konyaspor until the end of the 2022–23 season with an option of a permanent transfer at the end of the season.

=== 1. FC Nürnberg ===
On 6 August 2024, Emreli joined German 2. Bundesliga club 1. FC Nürnberg.

== International career ==
=== Youth ===
He was part of the Azerbaijan under-23 team that won the football competition at the 2017 Islamic Solidarity Games. He was selected by Yashar Vahabzade for that tournament's squad, appearing in five games and scoring two goal in the final to help defeat Oman 2–1 .

=== Senior ===
Emreli made his Azerbaijan debut on 9 March 2017 against Qatar in friendly match.

He scored his first goal for Azerbaijan on 29 May 2018, in a friendly match against Kyrgyzstan.

== Sponsorship ==
In 2018, Emreli signed a sponsorship deal with American sportswear and equipment supplier, Nike.

== Personal life ==
In May 2019, Mahir changed his surname from Mədətov to his mother's family name of Emreli, expressing disapproval at his father's marriage to another woman.

== Career statistics ==
=== Club ===
As of match played 8 November 2026

Appearances and goals by club, season and competition
Club	Season	League			National cup (Note: Includes Azerbaijan Cup, Polish Cup, Croatian Football Cup, DFB-Pokal)		Europe		Other		Total	
Club	Season	Division	Apps	Goals	Apps	Goals	Apps	Goals	Apps	Goals	Apps	Goals
Baku	2014–15	Azerbaijan Premier League	17	0	3	1	—		—		20	1
Qarabağ	2015–16	Azerbaijan Premier League	16	7	5	1	0	0	—		21	8
Qarabağ	2016–17	Azerbaijan Premier League	21	3	5	3	6 (Note: Three appearances in UEFA Champions League, three appearances in UEFA Europa League)	0	—		32	6
Qarabağ	2017–18	Azerbaijan Premier League	24	8	2	0	11 (Note: Appearances in UEFA Champions League)	1	—		37	9
Qarabağ	2018–19	Azerbaijan Premier League	27	16	4	0	14 (Note: Eight appearances in UEFA Champions League, six appearances in UEFA Europa League)	0	—		45	16
Qarabağ	2019–20	Azerbaijan Premier League	16	7	2	1	12 (Note: Six appearances and two goals in UEFA Champions League, six appearances in UEFA Europa League)	2	—		30	10
Qarabağ	2020–21	Azerbaijan Premier League	22	18	3	2	7 (Note: Three appearances and two goals in UEFA Champions League, four appearances in UEFA Europa League)	2	—		32	22
Qarabağ	Total		126	59	21	7	50	5	—		217	72
Legia Warsaw	2021–22	Ekstraklasa	15	2	3	1	14 (Note: Six appearances and two goals in UEFA Champions League, eight appearances and five goals in UEFA Europa League)	7	1 (Note: Appearance in Polish Super Cup)	1	33	11
Dinamo Zagreb	2021–22	Prva HNL	8	2	0	0	2 (Note: Appearances in UEFA Europa League)	0	—		10	2
Dinamo Zagreb	2022–23	Prva HNL	10	3	0	0	3	0	—		13	3
Dinamo Zagreb	2023–24	Prva HNL	14	4	1	1	9 (Note: Three appearances in UEFA Champions League, two appearances in UEFA Europa League, four appearances in UEFA Europa Conference League)	0	0	0	24	5
Dinamo Zagreb	Total		32	9	1	1	14	0	0	0	47	10
Konyaspor (loan)	2022–23	Süper Lig	12	2	—		—		—		12	2
1. FC Nürnberg	2024–25	2. Bundesliga	24	10	1	1	—		—		25	11
1. FC Kaiserslautern	2025–26	2. Bundesliga	12	1	1	1	—		—		13	2
Raków Częstochowa (loan)	2026–27	Ekstraklasa	14	3	1	0	6 (Note: Appearances in UEFA Conference League)	3	—		21	6
Career total			252	86	31	12	84	15	1	1	368	114

=== International ===
As of match played 16 November 2026

Appearances and goals by national team and year
National team	Year	Apps	Goals
Azerbaijan
Azerbaijan	2017	3	0
Azerbaijan	2018	10	2
Azerbaijan	2019	6	2
Azerbaijan	2020	4	0
Azerbaijan	2021	9	0
Azerbaijan	2022	7	1
Azerbaijan	2023	7	0
Azerbaijan	2024	5	1
Azerbaijan	2025	8	0
Azerbaijan	2026	8	2
Total		67	8

Scores and results list Azerbaijan's goal tally first, score column indicates score after each Emreli goal.

List of international goals scored by Mahir Emreli
No.	Date	Venue	Opponent	Score	Result	Competition
1	29 May 2018	Baku Olympic Stadium, Baku, Azerbaijan	Kyrgyzstan	2–0	3–0	Friendly
2	17 November 2018	Baku Olympic Stadium, Baku, Azerbaijan	Faroe Islands	2–0	2–0	2018–19 UEFA Nations League D
3	8 June 2019	Bakcell Arena, Baku, Azerbaijan	Hungary	1–2	1–3	UEFA Euro 2020 qualification
4	6 September 2019	Cardiff City Stadium, Cardiff, Wales	Wales	1–1	1–2	UEFA Euro 2020 qualification
5	13 June 2022	Dalga Arena, Baku, Azerbaijan	Belarus	1–0	2–0	2022–23 UEFA Nations League C
6	11 June 2024	Haladás Sportkomplexum, Szombathely, Hungary	Kazakhstan	1–2	3–2	Friendly
7	27 September 2026	Darius and Girėnas Stadium, Kaunas, Lithuania	Lithuania	1–1	1–1	2026–27 UEFA Nations League D
8	13 November 2026	Rheinpark Stadion, Vaduz, Liechtenstein	Liechtenstein	1–0	1–0	2026–27 UEFA Nations League D

== Honours ==
Qarabağ

- Azerbaijan Premier League: 2015–16, 2016–17, 2017–18, 2018–19, 2019–20
- Azerbaijan Cup: 2015–16, 2016–17

Dinamo Zagreb

- Croatian First Football League: 2021–22, 2023–24
- Croatian Cup: 2023–24
- Croatian Super Cup: 2023

Azerbaijan U23

- Islamic Solidarity Games: 2017

Individual

- Azerbaijan Premier League top scorer: 2018–19, 2019–20
