= Football Championship of the Azerbaijan SSR =

Championship of the Azerbaijan SSR
- Founded: 1928
- Folded: 1991
- Country: Azerbaijan SSR (Soviet Union)
- Last champions: Polad Sumgait (2nd title) (1991)
- Most championships: 7 – Araz Baku

The Championship of the Azerbaijan SSR in football was a top competition of association football in the Azerbaijan SSR in 1928–91.

== List of champions ==
- 1928: Progress-2 Baku
- 1929–33: unknown
- 1934: Profsoyuz Baku
- 1935: Stroitel Yuga Baku
- 1936: Stroitel Yuga Baku
- 1937: Lokomotiv Baku
- 1938: Lokomotiv Baku
- 1939: Lokomotiv Baku
- 1940: Lokomotiv Baku
- 1941–43: unknown
- 1944: Dinamo Baku
- 1945: Neftyanik Baku
- 1946: Lokomotiv Baku
- 1947: Trudovye Rezervy Baku
- 1948: KKF Baku
- 1949: KKF Baku
- 1950: Iskra Baku
- 1951: Ordjonikidzeneft Baku
- 1952: Ordjonikidzeneft Baku
- 1953: Ordjonikidzeneft Baku
- 1954: Zavod im. S.M. Budennogo Baku
- 1955: Ordjonikidzeneft Baku
- 1956: NPU Ordgonikidzeneft Baku
- 1957: NPU Ordjonikidzeneft Baku
- 1958: NPU Ordjonikidzeneft Baku
- 1959: Baku Teams (Spartakiada)
- 1960: SKA Baku
- 1961: Spartak Guba
- 1962: SKA Baku
- 1963: Araz Baku
- 1964: Polad Sumgait
- 1965: Vostok Baku
- 1966: Vostok Baku
- 1967: Araz Baku
- 1968: SKA Baku
- 1969: Araz Baku
- 1970: SKA Baku
- 1971: Khimik Salyany
- 1972: Surahanets Baku
- 1973: Araz Baku
- 1974: Araz Baku
- 1975: Araz Baku
- 1976: Araz Baku
- 1977: Karabakh Khankendi
- 1978: SKIF Baku
- 1979: SKA Baku
- 1980: Energetik Ali-Bayramly
- 1981: Gandjlik Baku
- 1982: Tokhudju Baku
- 1983: Termist Baku
- 1984: Termist Baku
- 1985: Khazar Sumgayit
- 1986: Göyəzən
- 1987: Araz Naxçıvan
- 1988: Qarabağ Ağdam
- 1989: Stroitel Sabirabad
- 1990: Qarabağ Ağdam
- 1991: Khazar Sumgayit

== See also ==
- Azerbaijan Premier League
