= Elbrus Abbasov =

Azerbaijani footballer (1950–2020)

Personal information
- Full name: Elbrus Osman oğlu Abbasov
- Date of birth: 1950
- Place of birth: Aghdam, Azerbaijan SSR, Soviet Union
- Date of death: 14 December 2020 (aged 69–70)
- Place of death: Baku, Azerbaijan
- Position: Forward

Senior career*
Years	Team	Apps	(Gls)
1967–1972	Mahsul		
1972–1974	Dinamo Kirovabad		
1975–1979	Neftçi	99	(44)

Managerial career
- 1988: Qarabağ
- 1990: Qarabağ
- 1996–1997: Qarabağ
- 2000: Qarabağ
- * Club domestic league appearances and goals

Elbrus Abbasov (Azerbaijani: Elbrus Osman oğlu Abbasov; 1950 – 14 December 2020) was an Azerbaijani professional footballer.

== Honours ==
=== Individual ===
- Soviet First League Top Scorer (1): 1976

== Death ==
On 14 December 2020, Elbrus Abbasov died from complications related to COVID-19 during the COVID-19 pandemic in Azerbaijan.
