= Aghasalim Mirjavadov =

Azerbaijani footballer and coach (born 1947)

Agaselim Mirjavadov
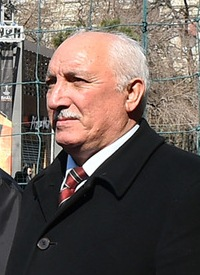

Personal information
- Full name: Ağasəlim Seyidəhməd oğlu Mircavadov
- Date of birth: 22 October 1947 (age 79)
- Place of birth: Baku, Azerbaijan, Azerbaijani SSR, USSR
- Position: Defender

Senior career*
Years	Team	Apps	(Gls)
1967–1971	Neftçi	20	(0)

Managerial career
- 1987–1988: Neftçi
- 1989: Neftçi
- 1991: Qarabağ
- 1993–1994: Qarabağ
- 1994–1996: Qarabağ
- 1994–1995: Azerbaijan
- 1997–1998: Baki Fehlesi
- 1998–1999: Qarabağ
- 1999–2001: Shamkir
- 2004–2006: Neftçi
- 2006–2008: Khazar Lankaran
- 2009–2010: Khazar Lankaran
- * Club domestic league appearances and goals

Aghasalim Seyidahmed oglu Mirjavadov (Azerbaijani: Ağasəlim Mircavadov, Russian: Агасалим Мирджавадов) (born 11 April 1947, Baku, Azerbaijan SSR, USSR) is a soccer coach of Khazar Lankaran.

== Achievements ==
- Azerbaijan Premier League
  - Winner: 5
  - Runner-up:
- Azerbaijan Cup
  - Winner:
- CIS Cup
  - Winner: 2 (2006, 2008)
- Individual
  - Shohrat Order: 2008

== Personal life ==
Mirjavadov is a fan of mugham and his favourite writer is Chingiz Abdullayev.
