= Qurban Qurbanov =

Azerbaijani former footballer and current manager (born 1972)

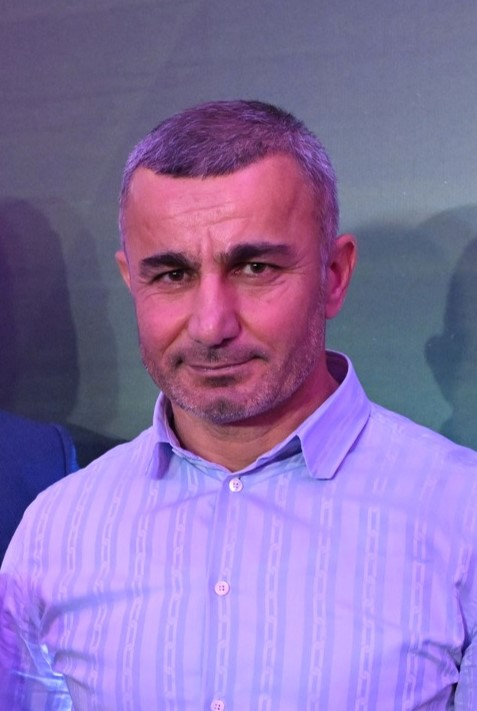
- Qurbanov in 2023

Personal information
- Date of birth: 13 April 1972 (age 54)
- Place of birth: Ashaghy Tala, Zagatala District, Azerbaijan SSR, Soviet Union
- Height: 1.79 m (5 ft 10 in)
- Position: Forward

Team information
- Current team: Qarabağ (manager)

Senior career*
Years	Team	Apps	(Gls)
1989–1991	Daşqın Zaqatala	54	(23)
1991–1992	Mertskhali Ozurgeti	17	(4)
1992–1993	Daşqın Zaqatala	39	(24)
1993–1995	Turan Tovuz	54	(21)
1995–1996	Kür Nur	12	(3)
1996–1998	Neftçi	43	(43)
1998	Dynamo Stavropol	37	(18)
1999	Baltika Kaliningrad	14	(1)
1999–2001	Fakel Voronezh	37	(10)
2001	Neftçi	14	(9)
2002	Fakel Voronezh	28	(7)
2003	Volgar Astrakhan	21	(0)
2004–2005	Neftçi	23	(10)
2005–2006	Inter Baku	3	(1)
Total		396	(174)

International career
1992–2005	Azerbaijan	68	(14)

Managerial career
- 2006–2007: Neftçi
- 2008–: Qarabağ
- 2017–2018: Azerbaijan
Signature
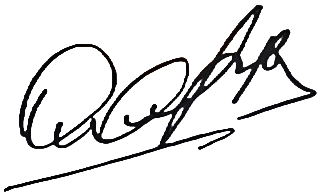
- * Club domestic league appearances and goals

Qurban Osman oğlu Qurbanov (born 13 April 1972) is an Azerbaijani professional football manager and former player who manages Azerbaijan Premier League club Qarabağ.

In his playing days, he was a forward. Starting out with his local club Kür Nur in 1988, Qurbanov enjoyed a decorated 18-year career. He scored 178 goals in 399 league matches. With 14 goals in 68 matches, he used to be the Azerbaijan national team's all-time leading goalscorer in international matches until Emin Mahmudov broke his record in 2025.

After coaching Neftçi from 2006 to 2007, Qurbanov became the manager of Qarabağ in 2008. From 2017 to 2018, he was simultaneously the manager of the Azerbaijan national team. Qurbanov has won a total of 22 trophies in his career: five as a player and 17 as a manager.

== Playing career ==
He started his career in Kür Nur, and has since played for Mertskhali Ozurgeti, Daşqın Zaqatala, Alazani Gurjaani, Turan Tovuz, Neftçi, Dinamo Stavropol, Baltika Kaliningrad, Fakel Voronezh and Volgar Astrakhan. The last club he played for was Inter Baku. In the 1996–97 season, Qurbanov was the leading scorer in the Azerbaijan Premier League for Neftchi with 25 goals. The striker was named Azerbaijan's Player of the Year once, in 2003.

== International career ==
Qurbanov debuted for the Azerbaijan national team in their very first match on 17 September 1992, and as of January 2006, he had scored 14 goals in 68 international matches, which was the national team goal scoring record until it was broken on 9 September 2025 by Emin Mahmudov.

== Managerial career ==
After Qurbanov ended his football player's career, he became sport director of the club Inter. In summer 2006 he was appointed head coach of Neftçi.

At the beginning of the 2008–09 season, he became head coach of Qarabağ FK to replace Rasim Kara.

In 2010, he became the most successful Azerbaijani manager in European competitions with 16 wins.

In May 2014, he guided Qarabağ to their second Azerbaijani league title after 21 years. In July 2014, he became the second Azerbaijani manager to reach the European Cups group stage, as Qarabağ qualified for the 2014–15 UEFA Europa League group stage, beating Twente and being the second Azerbaijani team to advance to this stage in a European competitions.

In 2017, Qarabağ FK, managed by Qurbanov, became the first Azerbaijani team to reach the group stages of the UEFA Champions League.

On 3 November 2017, Qurbanov was appointed manager of the Azerbaijan national team. A year later, on 8 December 2018, he resigned.

In 2025, with him still managing the team, Qarabağ FK reached the league phase of the UEFA Champions League. They won their two opening games against Benfica in Lisbon and Copenhagen at home.

On 23 December 2025, at the event dedicated to the 2025 sports year review organized by the Ministry of Youth and Sports of Azerbaijan, Qurban Qurbanov was awarded the title of “Best Men’s Coach of 2025.”

== Personal life ==
Gurban is the brother of former Azerbaijani footballer Musa Qurbanov. He is the father of Azerbaijan national team player Musa Qurbanlı.

In 2012, he campaigned to stop domestic violence.

== Career statistics ==
Scores and results list Azerbaijan's goal tally first; the score column indicates the score after each Qurbanov goal.

List of international goals scored by Qurban Qurbanov
No.	Date	Venue	Opponent	Score	Result	Competition	Ref.
1	8 June 1993	Azadi Stadium, Tehran, Iran	Kazakhstan U21	1–0	3–3	1993 ECO Cup	
2	8 June 1993	Azadi Stadium, Tehran, Iran	Kazakhstan U21	2–1	3–3	1993 ECO Cup	
3	27 February 1996	Antonis Papadopoulos Stadium, Larnaca, Cyprus	Faroe Islands	3–0	3–0	Friendly	
4	27 May 1996	City Stadium, Maladzyechna, Belarus	Belarus	1–1	2–2	Friendly	
5	22 March 1997	Tofiq Bahramov Republican Stadium, Baku, Azerbaijan	Turkmenistan	3–0	3–0	Friendly	
6	14 October 1998	Rheinpark Stadion, Vaduz, Liechtenstein	Liechtenstein	1–2	1–2	UEFA Euro 2000 qualifying	
7	6 March 1999	Antonis Papadopoulos Stadium, Larnaca, Cyprus	Estonia	1–0	2–2	Friendly	
8	5 June 1999	Tofiq Bahramov Republican Stadium, Baku, Azerbaijan	Liechtenstein	1–0	4–0	UEFA Euro 2000 qualifying	
9	12 February 2003	Podgorica City Stadium, Podgorica, Serbia and Montenegro	Serbia and Montenegro	1–2	2–2	UEFA Euro 2004 qualifying	
10	12 February 2003	Podgorica City Stadium, Podgorica, Serbia and Montenegro	Serbia and Montenegro	2–2	2–2	UEFA Euro 2004 qualifying	
11	11 June 2003	Shafa Stadion, Baku, Azerbaijan	Serbia and Montenegro	1–1	2–1	UEFA Euro 2004 qualifying	
12	31 March 2004	Stadionul Republican, Chișinău, Moldova	Moldova	1–1	2–1	Friendly	
13	28 May 2004	Tofiq Bahramov Republican Stadium, Baku, Azerbaijan	Uzbekistan	1–0	3–1	Friendly	
14	6 June 2004	Skonto Stadium, Riga, Latvia	Latvia	2–1	2–2	Friendly	

== Managerial statistics ==
As of match played 22 November 2026

Managerial record by team and tenure
Team	Nat	From	To	Record							
Team	Nat	From	To	G	W	D	L	GF	GA	GD	Win %
Neftçi Baku	(Azerbaijan)	8 June 2006	28 August 2007	38	25	6	7	79	30	+49	65.79
Qarabağ	(Azerbaijan)	5 August 2008	present	860	496	201	163	1,477	701	+776	57.67
Azerbaijan	(Azerbaijan)	7 November 2017	30 November 2018	12	4	5	3	14	12	+2	33.33
Total				910	525	212	173	1,570	743	+827	57.69

== Honours ==
=== Player ===
Turan Tovuz

- Azerbaijan Premier League: 1993–94

Neftçi

- Azerbaijan Premier League: 1996–97, 2003–04, 2004–05
- Azerbaijan Cup: 2003–04

Individual

- Azerbaijani Footballer of the Year: 2003
- Azerbaijan Premier League top scorer: 1996–97

=== Manager ===
Qarabağ

- Azerbaijan Premier League: 2013–14, 2014–15, 2015–16, 2016–17, 2017–18, 2018–19, 2019–20, 2021–22, 2022–23, 2023–24, 2024–25
- Azerbaijan Cup: 2008–09, 2014–15, 2015–16, 2016–17, 2021–22, 2023–24
