= Qarabağ FK =

Association football club in Azerbaijan

Qarabag
- Full name: Qarabağ Futbol Klubu
- Nicknames: Atlılar (The Horsemen); Göy-ağlar (Blue and Whites)
- Founded: 1951; 75 years ago (as Məhsul); 1987; 39 years ago (as Qarabağ)
- Ground: Azersun Arena
- Capacity: 5,800
- Owner: Azersun Holding
- President: Tahir Gözel
- Manager: Qurban Qurbanov
- League: Azerbaijan Premier League
- 2025–26: Azerbaijan Premier League, 2nd of 12
- Website: www.qarabagh.com
Home colours	Away colours	Third colours

Qarabağ Futbol Klubu (pronounced [ɡɑˈrɑbɑɣ]) is an Azerbaijani professional football club that competes in the Azerbaijan Premier League, the top flight of Azerbaijani football. The club originates from Aghdam in the Karabakh region but has not played in its hometown since 1993 due to the First Nagorno-Karabakh War. The club now plays in Baku, the capital city of Azerbaijan, at the Azersun Arena and Tofiq Bahramov Republican Stadium, which also serves as the venue for Azerbaijan national team matches.

Formed in 1987, Qarabağ were founding members of the Azerbaijan Premier League in 1992. One season later, they won their first league championship, becoming the first non-Baku-based club to win the Premier League title. Qarabağ is one of the two teams in Azerbaijan, along with Neftçi PFK which has participated in all Premier League championships so far.

In 2014, the club won the Premier League, their first league title in 21 years. Qarabağ has won the Premier League twelve times and the Azerbaijan Cup eight times. Qarabağ became the second Azerbaijani team after Neftçi PFK to advance to the group stage of a European competition, making it to the UEFA Europa League group stage in the 2014–15 season. Qarabağ is the first Azerbaijani team to advance to the group stage of the higher UEFA Champions League, competing in the 2017–18 season. The club has played more UEFA matches than any other Azerbaijani team.

== History ==
=== Soviet era (1951–1991) ===
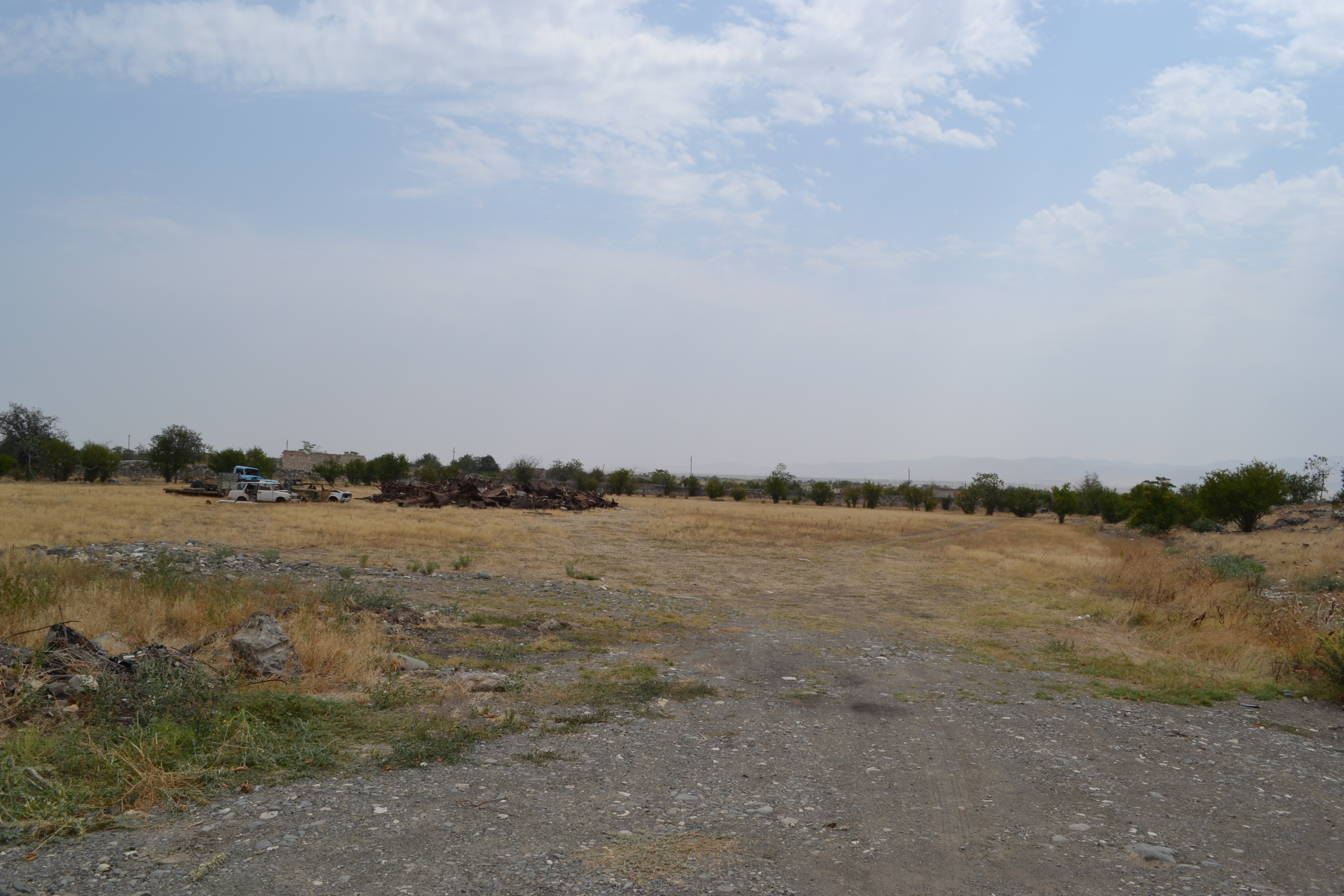
The ground at Aghdam (pictured in 2021), where the Məhsul Club played its earliest football.

The club was founded in 1951 as Məhsul after the Aghdam city stadium was built; there then began a serious effort towards the creation of a professional football team. Consequently, Qarabağ FK, playing under the name of Məhsul, took part in the 1966 Azerbaijani SSR championship. That year, the club reached fourth place in the local championship.

Qarabağ participated in the local championship for four consecutive years, during which second place was their best result (achieved in 1969). After 1969, however, owing to carelessness and a lack of financial support, the team withdrew from the championships for almost ten years. In 1977, the team was reborn under the name Şəfəq. In 1982, Şəfəq was the only representative of Aghdam in football. Between 1982 and 1987, the squad used the name "Kooperator". In 1988, Qarabağ won the champions title in the Azerbaijan SSR local championship under its current name. In addition to championship medals, the club won the right to play in the Soviet Second League.

=== Effects of war and financial struggles (1991–2008) ===
On 23 July 1993, during the First Nagorno-Karabakh War, the city of Agdam was seized by Armenian armed forces, and the team was forced to move from Imarat Stadium to Baku, while the former head coach and player of the team, Allahverdi Baghirov, died in the war. Despite all these difficulties, in 1993, Qarabağ won the Top League as well as the Azerbaijan Cup. Financial problems plagued the club during the period from 1998 to 2001, and the club went through hard times, although it became the first Azerbaijani team to win away from home in a European competition by defeating the Israeli side Maccabi Haifa in the 1999 UEFA Intertoto Cup thanks to a double strike from club legend Mushfig Huseynov. Qarabağ has also represented Azerbaijan in the UEFA Cup Winners' Cup and UEFA Cup many times.

These problems were alleviated in 2001, when one of the largest holding companies of Azerbaijan, Azersun Holding, started sponsoring the team. The squad used the name of Qarabag-Azersun for two seasons, but then returned to its original name in 2004.

=== Gurban Gurbanov era (2008–present) ===
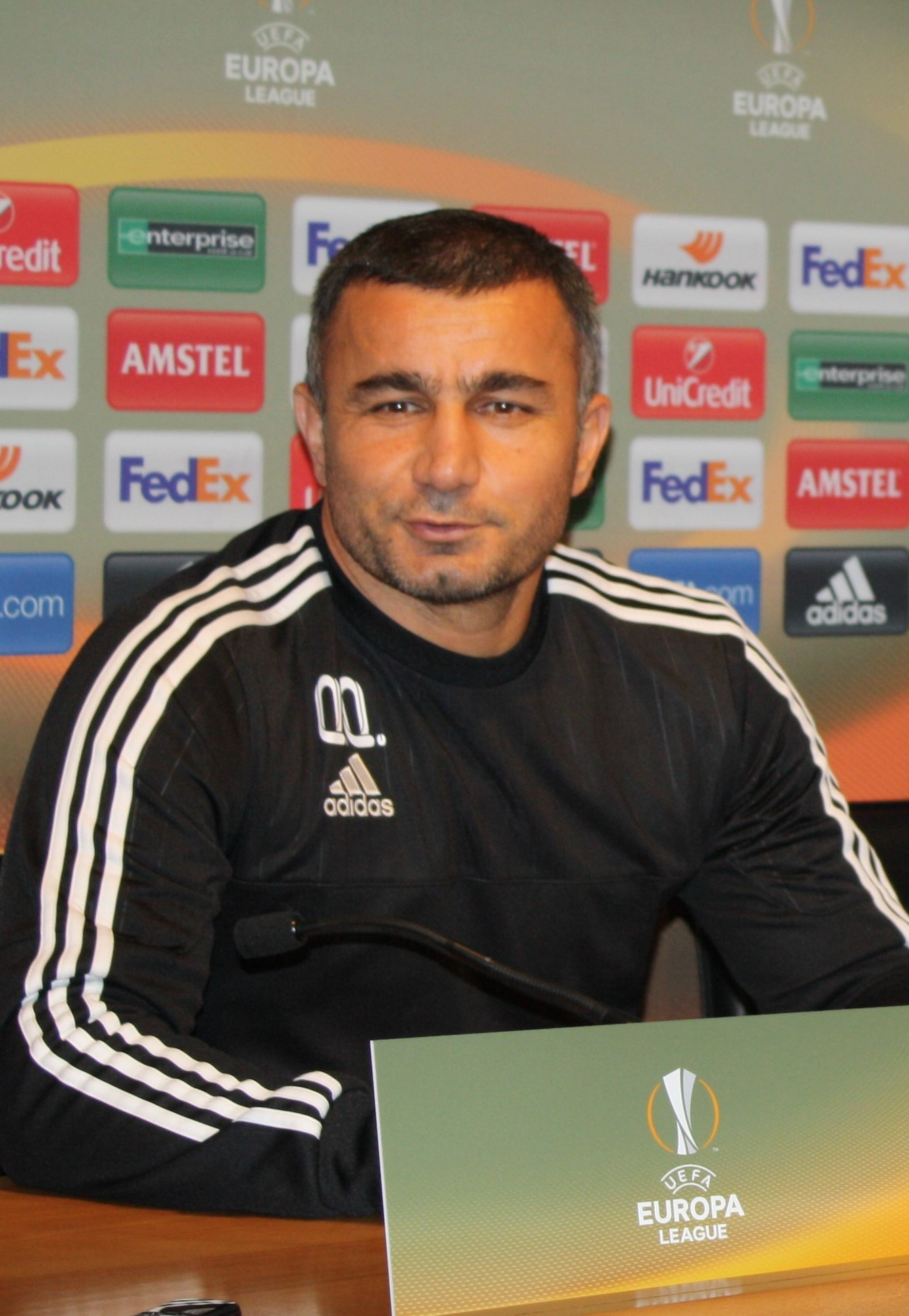
Gurban Gurbanov, the most successful Azerbaijani manager in European competitions.

In 2008, former Azerbaijani football star Gurban Gurbanov was appointed as head coach after the unexpected departure of Rasim Kara to Khazar Lankaran one week before the start of the 2008–09 season. Led by Gurbanov, Qarabağ has ignored a common strategy in Azerbaijani football: eschewing foreign signings in favour of nurturing local talent. Gurbanov brought with him a tiki-taka style of play, characterised by short passes, long periods of build-up, and players interchanging positions.

Under Gurbanov, Qarabağ has become one of the most successful Azerbaijani football clubs in Europe (with three consecutive wins) and one that reached the UEFA Europa League play-off-round by beating Rosenborg in the UEFA Europa League, and also eliminated Honka of Finland. The achievements in European competitions have made Gurbanov among the most successful Azerbaijani managers ever.

In 2010, the club set an Azerbaijani record for the most significant win in a European competition by beating Metalurg Skopje 4–1 in Baku and eliminating Wisła Kraków to reach the play-offs for the second year in succession. In 2011, the club duplicated the same record by beating Banga Gargždai 4–0 in Gargždai. The 2011–12 season ended in disappointing style for Qarabağ, however, as they finished in fourth place, leaving the club without European competition. In 2013, Qarabağ reached the Europa League play-off-round for third time in their history.

In May 2014, Qarabağ earned its second league title after 21 years. A month later, by beating Red Bull Salzburg, the club became the first Azerbaijani side to win in the third round of UEFA Champions League. In August 2014, the club reached the Europa League play-off round for the fourth time in the last five seasons. In 2014, Qarabağ qualified for the 2014–15 Europa League group stage, becoming the second Azerbaijani team to advance to this stage in a European competition. On 23 October 2014, after defeating Ukrainian club Dnipro Dnipropetrovsk 1–0, the team became the first Azerbaijani club to win a Europa League group stage match.

In 2017, after victory over the Sheriff Tiraspol, Qarabağ qualified for the UEFA Champions League play-off rounds for the first time. In the first leg, they recorded a 1–0 victory over Danish side F.C. Copenhagen in Baku. Despite losing 2–1 in the second leg, Qarabağ won on away goals and became the first Azerbaijani team to reach the group stages of the UEFA Champions League. They were drawn in Group C alongside Chelsea, Atlético Madrid and Roma, where they managed to obtain two points in six games after two draws and four losses.

In July and August 2021, Qarabağ secured their first participation in the group stage of UEFA Europa Conference League. Qarabağ knocked-out Ashdod (0–0 and 1–0), AEL Limassol (1–1 and 1–0) and Aberdeen (1–0 and 3–1) in the qualifiers. On 27 August, Qarabağ was drawn on Group H of the 2021–22 UEFA Europa Conference League alongside Basel, Kairat and Omonia. They eventually placed 2nd in the group, making it to the Knockout Play-off Round.

In the 2023–24 season Qarabağ made it to the Europa League group stage, where they finished 2nd behind Bayer Leverkusen. Qarabağ was subsequently drawn against Braga in the knockout round playoff. The first leg ended as a 4–2 victory for Qarabağ. The second leg would finish 2–0 to Braga after normal time, but ultimately ended 3–2 to the Portuguese side after extra time, which meant Qarabağ won 6–5 on aggregate, and thus became the first-ever team from Azerbaijan to reach the round of 16 in any UEFA club competition. The round of 16 draw pitted them against Bayer Leverkusen, whom they had already played earlier in the group stages. The club tied with Bayer Leverkusen 2–2 in the first leg at home but was knocked out in the second leg following two stoppage-time goals from Patrik Schick, ending the game 3–2.

In the 2024–25 season, on April 27, 2025, Qarabağ secured the championship with four rounds remaining by drawing 1–1 against Sabah in the 32nd round of the Premier League, thus becoming Premier League champions for the 12th time in their history and for the 4th consecutive time. The club qualified for the UEFA Champions League again after beating Hungarian champions Ferencvárosi TC 5–4 on aggregate. The first match of the club back at the Champions League was a comeback 2–3 victory against Benfica. Following this victory, President Ilham Aliyev congratulated the club for its victory. On October 1, Qarabağ Agdam claimed their second win in the UEFA Champions League group stage with a 2-0 victory over Copenhagen at the Tofig Bahramov Republican Stadium in Baku. Qarabağ became the first Azerbaijani side to record back-to-back Champions League wins as they beat Copenhagen.

On 28 January 2026, Qarabağ lost away to Liverpool in the eighth and final round of the league phase of the UEFA Champions League. Nevertheless, with 10 points collected in the league phase and finishing 22nd in the tournament standings, Qarabağ made history as the first Azerbaijani club to advance to the Champions League knockout phase.

== Stadium ==
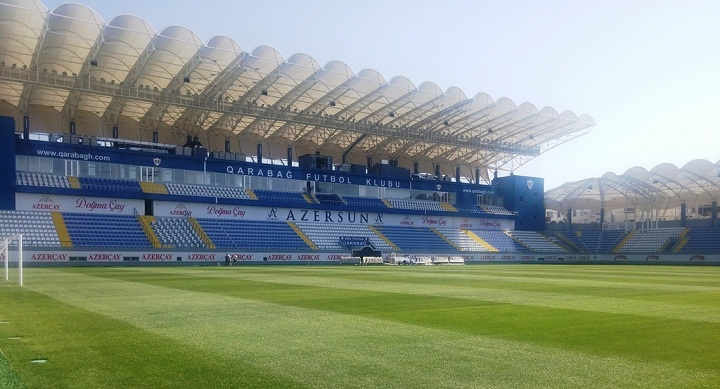
Azersun Arena.

The club has previously used Guzanli Olympic Stadium, which is situated in Quzanlı, the most populous municipality in the Agdam Rayon of Nagorno-Karabakh, Azerbaijan. The Imarat Stadium which was the club's original home stadium, was destroyed as a result of artillery attacks from Armenian military forces during the First Nagorno-Karabakh War.

In 2012, the construction of a new football stadium, Azersun Arena was announced, which was opened in June 2015. Azersun Arena is a multi-use football stadium in the Surakhani settlement of Baku, Azerbaijan. It is currently used as the club's Azerbaijan Premier League home stadium and holds 5,800 people.

The Baku Olympic Stadium and Tofiq Bahramov Republican Stadium is used for UEFA Champions League and UEFA Europa League games, where the record attendance for Qarabağ occurred on 27 September 2017, in a UEFA Champions League group stage match attended by 67,200 fans against Roma.

On 21 December 2023, Qarabağ played the 2023–24 Azerbaijan Cup match against MOIK Baku at Khankendi Stadium, Khankendi, making it the first match played in the Karabakh Economic Region after the end of the Second Nagorno-Karabakh War.

== Supporters ==
Although a large part of Qarabağ's support is drawn from the local Aghdam population, they remain immensely well supported in the rest of Azerbaijan. This is mainly due to their being the only team to represent the war-torn Nagorno-Karabakh region in the league. The club draws support from the half a million Azerbaijani internally displaced people. Recently, thanks to achievements on the pitch, the club has been involved in special youth projects enforcing stability and development in the IDP settlements near the border of Nagorno-Karabakh.

The club has a few supporting groups such as Imarat, Qarabağ Ordusu, Boys Qarabağ, and Ladies of Qarabağ. These groups often receive free tickets to Qarabağ's games, which helps Karabakh to have more support from fans.

== Crest and colours ==
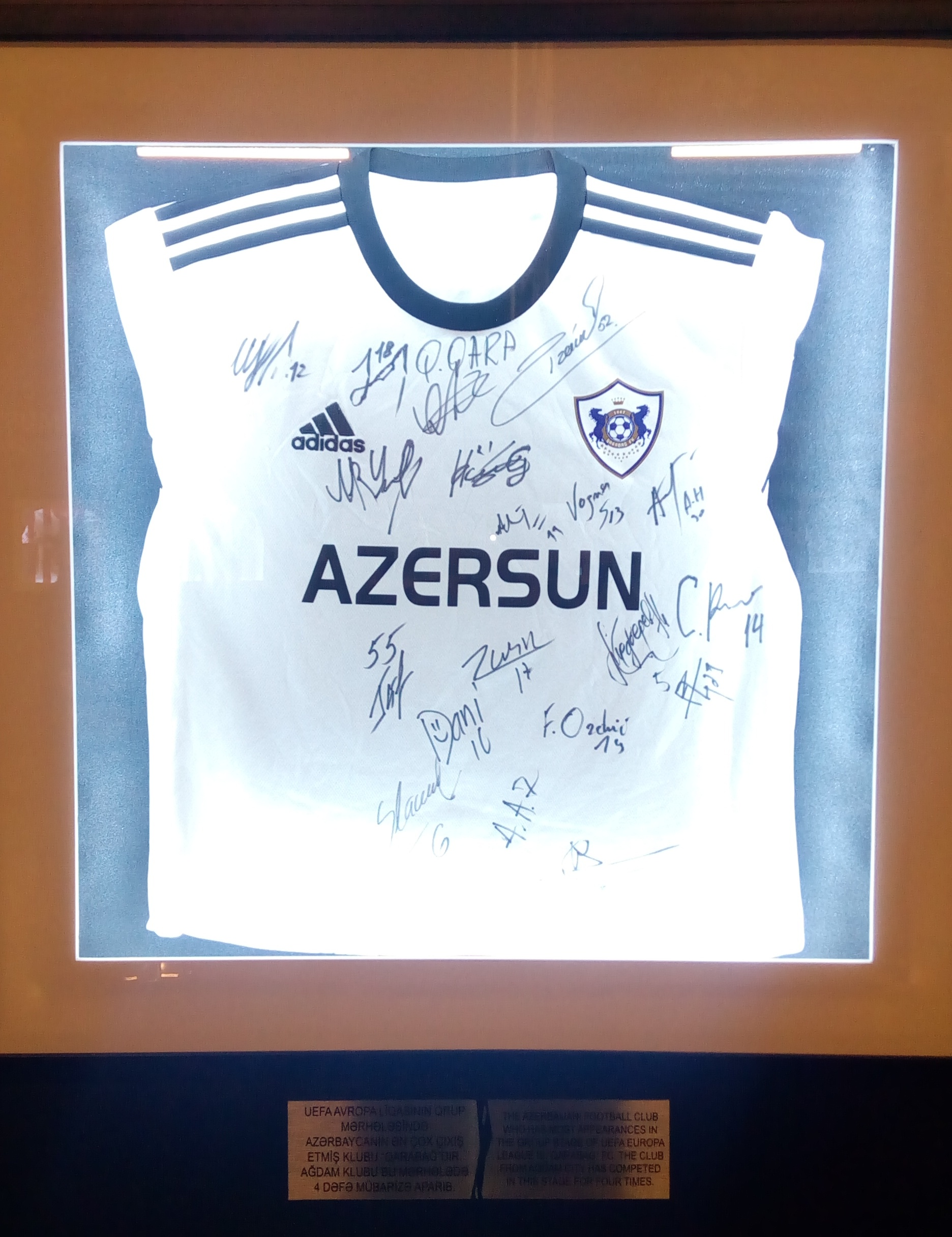
Qarabağ's away shirt for the 2018–19 campaign.

The crest on the club emblem is the symbol of the Karabakh. It is produced by English designers and based on the Karabakh horse. The horse stems from the club's nickname "The Horsemen"; although it was included on club programs and scarves earlier, the crest was not displayed on the shirt until 2004. After Gurban Gurbanov's appointment, Qarabağ's attractive style of play led fans to call the team "Qafqazın Barselonası" ("Barcelona of The Caucasus"), which plays upon Barcelona's success in Europe. The club is sometimes called "Qaçqın Klub" ("The Refugee Club") after its conservative position on the Nagorno-Karabakh conflict and refugee problem in Azerbaijan.

=== Shirt sponsors and kit manufacturers ===
Qarabağ's traditional kit alludes to the club's location in Nagorno-Karabakh with the black and white representing light and darkness, respectively. The club's kits are manufactured by Adidas and sponsored by Azersun, a Baku-based food-producing company.

Period	Kit manufacturer	Shirt sponsor
2003–2004	Fila	FINAL
2004–2007	Adidas	Azersun
2007–2008	Puma	Azersun
2008–2010	Adidas	Azersun
2010–2011	Adidas	Azərbaycan Sənaye Bankı
2011–2012	Kappa	Azersun
2012–2022	Adidas	Azersun
2022–2023	İl`Azero	Azersun
2023–	Adidas	Azersun

== Recent seasons ==
The season-by-season performance of the club over the last ten years:

Season	Div.	Pos.	Pl.	W	D	L	GS	GA	Diff	P	Cup	Europe		Top Scorer (League goals)	Head coach
2015–16	Premier League	1	36	26	6	4	66	21	+45	84	W	CL / EL	III R / GS	(Spain) Dani Quintana (15)	(Azerbaijan) Gurban Gurbanov
2016–17	Premier League	1	28	19	5	4	46	14	+32	62	W	CL / EL	III R / GS	(South Africa) Dino Ndlovu (10)	(Azerbaijan) Gurban Gurbanov
2017–18	Premier League	1	28	20	5	3	37	13	+24	65	QF	CL	GS	(Azerbaijan) Mahir Emreli (8)	(Azerbaijan) Gurban Gurbanov
2018–19	Premier League	1	27	19	6	2	62	19	+43	63	SF	CL / EL	III R / GS	(Azerbaijan) Mahir Emreli (16)	(Azerbaijan) Gurban Gurbanov
2019–20	Premier League	1	20	13	6	1	34	7	+27	45	SF	CL / EL	III R / GS	(Azerbaijan) Mahir Emreli (7)	(Azerbaijan) Gurban Gurbanov
2020–21	Premier League	2	28	16	9	3	64	18	+46	57	SF	CL / EL	III R / GS	(Azerbaijan) Mahir Emreli (18)	(Azerbaijan) Gurban Gurbanov
2021–22	Premier League	1	28	21	6	1	72	13	+59	69	W	ECL	KO	(Brazil) Kady Borges (12)	(Azerbaijan) Gurban Gurbanov
2022–23	Premier League	1	36	28	6	2	91	25	+66	90	QF	CL / EL / ECL	PO / GS / KO	(Azerbaijan) Ramil Sheydayev (22)	(Azerbaijan) Gurban Gurbanov
2023–24	Premier League	1	36	26	5	5	97	37	+60	83	W	CL / EL	II R / 1/8	(Brazil) Juninho (20)	(Azerbaijan) Gurban Gurbanov
2024–25	Premier League	1	36	28	5	3	86	19	+67	89	RU	CL / EL	PO / LP	(Cape Verde) Leandro Andrade (15)	(Azerbaijan) Gurban Gurbanov
2025–26	Premier League	2	33	21	6	6	71	27	+44	69	SF	CL	1/8	(Cape Verde) Leandro Andrade (9)	(Azerbaijan) Gurban Gurbanov

== European record ==
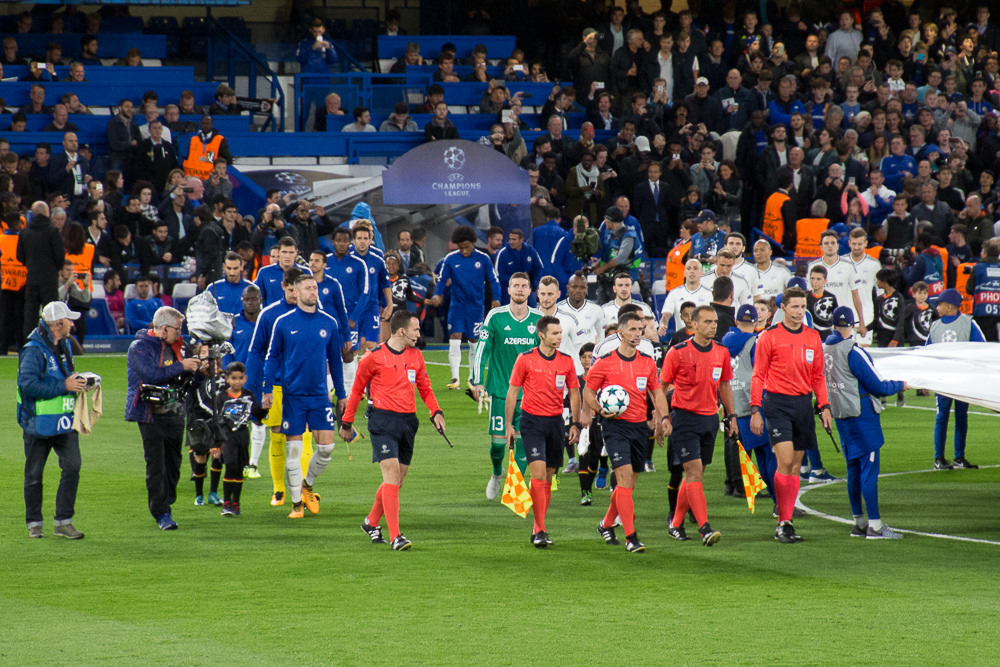
Qarabağ playing against Chelsea at Stamford Bridge during the 2017–18 UEFA Champions League.

The club has participated in 18 editions of the club competitions governed by UEFA, the chief authority for football across Europe. These include 7 seasons in the Champions League, 13 seasons in the UEFA Cup and Europa League, two seasons in the Cup Winners' Cup and one season in the UEFA Europa Conference League and Intertoto Cup. Qarabağ has played six times in the Europa League after qualifying via the Champions League. Counting all the 134 games the side has played in UEFA competitions since their first entry into the Cup Winners' Cup in the 1996–97 season, the team's record stands at 48 wins, 35 draws, and 51 defeats.

As of match played 30.08.2026

Tournament	P	W	D	L	GF	GA	GD	Win%
UEFA Champions League	73	32	19	22	113	89	+24	43.84
UEFA Cup / UEFA Europa League	113	39	25	49	130	158	−28	34.51
UEFA Europa Conference League	20	10	4	6	23	22	+1	50.00
UEFA Cup Winners' Cup	4	0	1	3	1	12	−11	0.00
UEFA Intertoto Cup	4	1	0	3	2	11	−9	25.00
Total	214	82	49	83	269	292	−23	38.32

=== Matches ===
Games of Qarabağ in UEFA competitions
Season	Competition	Round	Club	Home	Away	Aggregate
1996–97	Cup Winners' Cup	QR	(Finland) MyPa	0–1	1–1	1–2 (a.e.t.)
1997–98	UEFA Cup	1Q	(Czech Republic) Jablonec 97	0–3	0–5	0–8
1998–99	Cup Winners' Cup	QR	(Denmark) Copenhagen	0–4	0–6	0–10
1999	Intertoto Cup	1R	(Israel) Maccabi Haifa	0–1	2–1	2–2 (a)
1999	Intertoto Cup	2R	(France) Montpellier	0–3	0–6	0–9
2004–05	UEFA Cup	1Q	(Slovakia) Dukla	0–1	0–3	0–4
2006–07	UEFA Cup	1Q	(Moldova) Zimbru Chișinău	1–2	1–1	2–3 (a.e.t.)
2009–10	Europa League	2Q	(Norway) Rosenborg	1–0	0–0	1–0
2009–10	Europa League	3Q	(Finland) Honka	2–1	1–0	3–1
2009–10	Europa League	Play-off	(Netherlands) Twente	0–0	1–3	1–3
2010–11	Europa League	1Q	(North Macedonia) Metalurg Skopje	4–1	1–1	5–2
2010–11	Europa League	2Q	(Northern Ireland) Portadown	1–1	2–1	3–2
2010–11	Europa League	3Q	(Poland) Wisła Kraków	3–2	1–0	4–2
2010–11	Europa League	Play-off	(Germany) Borussia Dortmund	0–1	0–4	0–5
2011–12	Europa League	1Q	(Lithuania) Banga Gargždai	3–0	4–0	7–0
2011–12	Europa League	2Q	(Faroe Islands) EB/Streymur	0–0	1–1	1–1 (a)
2011–12	Europa League	3Q	(Belgium) Club Brugge	1–0	1–4	2–4
2013–14	Europa League	1Q	(North Macedonia) Metalurg Skopje	1–0	1–0	2–0
2013–14	Europa League	2Q	(Poland) Piast Gliwice	2–1	2–2	4–3 (a.e.t.)
2013–14	Europa League	3Q	(Sweden) Gefle IF	1–0	2–0	3–0
2013–14	Europa League	Play-off	(Germany) Eintracht Frankfurt	0–2	1–2	1–4
2014–15	Champions League	2Q	(Malta) Valletta	4–0	1–0	5–0
2014–15	Champions League	3Q	(Austria) Red Bull Salzburg	2–1	0–2	2–3
2014–15	Europa League	Play-off	(Netherlands) Twente	0–0	1–1	1–1 (a)
2014–15	Europa League	Group F	(France) Saint-Étienne	0–0	1–1	3rd
2014–15	Europa League	Group F	(Italy) Internazionale	0–0	0–2	3rd
2014–15	Europa League	Group F	(Ukraine) Dnipro	1–2	1–0	3rd
2015–16	Champions League	2Q	(Montenegro) Rudar Pljevlja	0–0	1–0	1–0
2015–16	Champions League	3Q	(Scotland) Celtic	0–0	0–1	0–1
2015–16	Europa League	Play-off	(Switzerland) Young Boys	3–0	1–0	4–0
2015–16	Europa League	Group J	(Belgium) Anderlecht	1–0	1–2	4th
2015–16	Europa League	Group J	(France) Monaco	1–1	0–1	4th
2015–16	Europa League	Group J	(England) Tottenham Hotspur	0–1	1–3	4th
2016–17	Champions League	2Q	(Luxembourg) Dudelange	2–0	1–1	3–1
2016–17	Champions League	3Q	(Czech Republic) Viktoria Plzeň	1–1	0–0	1–1 (a)
2016–17	Europa League	Play-off	(Sweden) IFK Göteborg	3–0	0–1	3–1
2016–17	Europa League	Group J	(Italy) Fiorentina	1–2	1–5	3rd
2016–17	Europa League	Group J	(Greece) PAOK	2–0	1–0	3rd
2016–17	Europa League	Group J	(Czech Republic) Slovan Liberec	2–2	0–3	3rd
2017–18	Champions League	2Q	(Georgia (country)) Samtredia	5–0	1–0	6–0
2017–18	Champions League	3Q	(Moldova) Sheriff Tiraspol	0–0	2–1	2–1
2017–18	Champions League	Play-off	(Denmark) Copenhagen	1–0	1–2	2–2 (a)
2017–18	Champions League	Group C	(Italy) Roma	1–2	0–1	4th
2017–18	Champions League	Group C	(Spain) Atlético Madrid	0–0	1–1	4th
2017–18	Champions League	Group C	(England) Chelsea	0–4	0–6	4th
2018–19	Champions League	1Q	(Slovenia) Olimpija Ljubljana	0–0	1–0	1–0
2018–19	Champions League	2Q	(Albania) Kukësi	3–0	0–0	3–0
2018–19	Champions League	3Q	(Belarus) BATE Borisov	0–1	1–1	1–2
2018–19	Europa League	Play-off	(Moldova) Sheriff Tiraspol	3–0	0–1	3–1
2018–19	Europa League	Group E	(Portugal) Sporting Lisbon	1–6	0–2	4th
2018–19	Europa League	Group E	(England) Arsenal	0–3	0–1	4th
2018–19	Europa League	Group E	(Ukraine) Vorskla Poltava	0–1	1–0	4th
2019–20	Champions League	1Q	(Albania) Partizani	2–0	0–0	2–0
2019–20	Champions League	2Q	(Republic of Ireland) Dundalk	3–0	1–1	4–1
2019–20	Champions League	3Q	(Cyprus) APOEL	0–2	2–1	2–3
2019–20	Europa League	PO	(Northern Ireland) Linfield	2–1	2–3	4–4 (a)
2019–20	Europa League	Group A	(Spain) Sevilla	0–3	0–2	3rd
2019–20	Europa League	Group A	(Cyprus) APOEL	2–2	1–2	3rd
2019–20	Europa League	Group A	(Luxembourg) F91 Dudelange	1–1	4–1	3rd
2020–21	Champions League	1Q	(North Macedonia) Sileks	4–0	—N/a	4–0
2020–21	Champions League	2Q	(Moldova) Sheriff Tiraspol	2–1	—N/a	2–1
2020–21	Champions League	3Q	(Norway) Molde	0–0	—N/a	0–0 (5–6 p)
2020–21	Europa League	PO	(Poland) Legia Warsaw	—N/a	3–0	3–0
2020–21	Europa League	Group I	(Spain) Villarreal	1–3	0–3 (awd.)	4th
2020–21	Europa League	Group I	(Israel) Maccabi Tel Aviv	1–1	0–1	4th
2020–21	Europa League	Group I	(Turkey) Sivasspor	2–3	0–2	4th
2021–22	Europa Conference League	2Q	(Israel) Ashdod	0–0	1–0	1–0
2021–22	Europa Conference League	3Q	(Cyprus) AEL Limassol	1–0	1–1	2–1
2021–22	Europa Conference League	PO	(Scotland) Aberdeen	1–0	3–1	4–1
2021–22	Europa Conference League	Group H	(Switzerland) Basel	0–0	0–3	2nd
2021–22	Europa Conference League	Group H	(Kazakhstan) Kairat	2–1	2–1	2nd
2021–22	Europa Conference League	Group H	(Cyprus) Omonia	2–2	4–1	2nd
2021–22	Europa Conference League	KPO	(France) Marseille	0–3	1–3	1–6
2022–23	Champions League	1Q	(Poland) Lech Poznań	5–1	0–1	5–2
2022–23	Champions League	2Q	(Switzerland) Zürich	3–2	2–2	5–4 (a.e.t.)
2022–23	Champions League	3Q	(Hungary) Ferencváros	1–1	3–1	4–2
2022–23	Champions League	PO	(Czech Republic) Viktoria Plzeň	0–0	1–2	1–2
2022–23	Europa League	Group G	(Greece) Olympiacos	0–0	3–0	3rd
2022–23	Europa League	Group G	(Germany) SC Freiburg	1–1	1–2	3rd
2022–23	Europa League	Group G	(France) Nantes	3–0	1–2	3rd
2022–23	Europa Conference League	KPO	(Belgium) Gent	1–0	0–1	1–1 (3–5 p)
2023–24	Champions League	1Q	(Gibraltar) Lincoln Red Imps	4–0	2–1	6–1
2023–24	Champions League	2Q	(Poland) Raków Częstochowa	1–1	2–3	3–4
2023–24	Europa League	3Q	(Finland) HJK	2–1	2–1	4–2
2023–24	Europa League	PO	(Slovenia) Olimpija Ljubljana	1–1	2–0	3–1
2023–24	Europa League	Group H	(Germany) Bayer Leverkusen	0–1	1–5	2nd
2023–24	Europa League	Group H	(Norway) Molde	1–0	2–2	2nd
2023–24	Europa League	Group H	(Sweden) BK Häcken	2–1	1–0	2nd
2023–24	Europa League	KPO	(Portugal) Braga	2–3	4–2	6–5 (a.e.t.)
2023–24	Europa League	RO16	(Germany) Bayer Leverkusen	2–2	2–3	4–5
2024–25	Champions League	2Q	(Gibraltar) Lincoln Red Imps	5−0	2−0	7−0
2024–25	Champions League	3Q	(Bulgaria) Ludogorets Razgrad	1–2	7−2	8−4 (a.e.t.)
2024–25	Champions League	PO	(Croatia) Dinamo Zagreb	0–3	0–2	0–5
2024–25	Europa League	LP	(Netherlands) Ajax	0–3	—N/a	36th
2024–25	Europa League	LP	(England) Tottenham Hotspur	—N/a	0–3	36th
2024–25	Europa League	LP	(France) Lyon	1–4	—N/a	36th
2024–25	Europa League	LP	(Greece) Olympiacos	—N/a	0–3	36th
2024–25	Europa League	LP	(Sweden) Malmö FF	1–2	—N/a	36th
2024–25	Europa League	LP	(Norway) Bodø/Glimt	—N/a	2–1	36th
2024–25	Europa League	LP	(Romania) FCSB	2–3	—N/a	36th
2024–25	Europa League	LP	(Sweden) IF Elfsborg	—N/a	0–1	36th
2025–26	Champions League	2Q	(Republic of Ireland) Shelbourne	1–0	3–0	4−0
2025–26	Champions League	3Q	(North Macedonia) Shkëndija	5–1	1–0	6−1
2025–26	Champions League	PO	(Hungary) Ferencváros	2–3	3–1	5–4
2025–26	Champions League	LP	(Portugal) Benfica	—N/a	3–2	22nd
2025–26	Champions League	LP	(Denmark) Copenhagen	2–0	—N/a	22nd
2025–26	Champions League	LP	(Spain) Athletic Bilbao	—N/a	1–3	22nd
2025–26	Champions League	LP	(England) Chelsea	2–2	—N/a	22nd
2025–26	Champions League	LP	(Italy) Napoli	—N/a	0–2	22nd
2025–26	Champions League	LP	(Netherlands) Ajax	2–4	—N/a	22nd
2025–26	Champions League	LP	(Germany) Eintracht Frankfurt	3–2	—N/a	22nd
2025–26	Champions League	LP	(England) Liverpool	—N/a	0-6	22nd
2025–26	Champions League	KPO	(England) Newcastle United	1–6	2–3	3–9
2026–27	Europa League	1Q	(Iceland) Vestri	3–0	3–0	6–0
2026–27	Europa League	2Q	(Bulgaria) CSKA Sofia	0–0	0–0	0–0 (4–5 p)
2026–27	Conference League	3Q	(Ukraine) Dynamo Kyiv	2–0	0-1	2–1
2026–27	Conference League	PO	(Netherlands) Twente	1–4	1–0	2–4 (a.e.t.)

=== UEFA club rankings ===
As of 25 June 2026

Rank	Team	Coefficient
58	(Czech Republic) Slavia Praha	34.000
59	(Azerbaijan) Qarabağ	33.750
60	(Czech Republic) Sparta Praha	33.250

== Players ==
The squad list includes only the principal nationality of each player; several non-European players on the squad have dual citizenship with an EU country.

=== Current squad ===
As of 28 August 2026

Note: Flags indicate national team as defined under FIFA eligibility rules; some limited exceptions apply. Players may hold more than one non-FIFA nationality.

No.	Pos.	Nation	Player
1	GK	AZE	Shakhruddin Magomedaliyev
2	DF	BRA	Matheus Silva
4	DF	HUN	Bence Várkonyi
5	DF	MOZ	Bruno Langa
7	MF	FRA	Jaly Mouaddib
8	MF	MNE	Marko Janković
9	FW	SWE	Zakaria Sawo
10	MF	ESP	Joni Montiel
11	MF	LBN	Reda Khadra
13	DF	AZE	Behlul Mustafazade
19	FW	NGR	Taofeek Ismaheel
20	MF	BRA	Kady Borges

No.	Pos.	Nation	Player
21	MF	UKR	Oleksiy Kashchuk
22	FW	AZE	Musa Qurbanlı
23	GK	BIH	Martin Zlomislić
25	DF	LAT	Čebrails Makreckis
29	FW	JAM	Renaldo Cephas
32	MF	AZE	Hikmat Jabrayilzade
33	MF	BRA	Diego Rosa
35	MF	BRA	Pedro Bicalho
39	DF	FRA	Jérémie Gnali
44	DF	AZE	Elvin Cafarguliyev
55	DF	AZE	Badavi Guseynov (captain)
88	MF	POR	Samuel Lobato

For recent transfers, see Transfers summer 2026.

=== Other players under contract ===
Note: Flags indicate national team as defined under FIFA eligibility rules; some limited exceptions apply. Players may hold more than one non-FIFA nationality.

No.	Pos.	Nation	Player
30	DF	AZE	Abbas Hüseynov

=== Reserve team ===
As of 20 May 2026

Note: Flags indicate national team as defined under FIFA eligibility rules; some limited exceptions apply. Players may hold more than one non-FIFA nationality.

No.	Pos.	Nation	Player
12	GK	AZE	Nijat Mammadzade
23	DF	AZE	Tofig Bayramov
25	DF	AZE	Javid Malikov
26	DF	AZE	Amin Rzayev
28	DF	AZE	Allahverdi Rahimov
33	MF	AZE	Ugur Safarov
37	FW	AZE	Ali Ibrahim
39	MF	AZE	Eltun Babazade
42	MF	AZE	Mahmud Aghayev
43	MF	TUR	Ahmet Levent Gülenç
45	FW	NGR	Toheeb Abiodun
47	MF	AZE	Mehdi Mutallimli
48	MF	AZE	Aliakbar Rzazade
49	MF	AZE	Ali Bashirov
65	MF	AZE	Sanan Aghayev
66	MF	AZE	Haji Ibrahim

No.	Pos.	Nation	Player
67	GK	AZE	Teymur Hasanov
70	MF	AZE	Murad Mammadov
71	DF	AZE	Masud Alishanli
73	MF	AZE	Ali Aliyev
74	DF	AZE	Sabuhi Niftiyev
75	MF	AZE	Javid Mammadov
76	MF	AZE	Nijat Khasiyev
78	MF	AZE	Ahmad Valiyev
79	FW	AZE	Shahismayil Jafarov
80	FW	AZE	Bahruz Gurbanli
82	DF	AZE	Mahammad Imamaliyev
85	MF	AZE	Ali Gazibeyov
91	MF	AZE	Elton Mikayilov
92	FW	AZE	Kanan Bakhishov
93	DF	AZE	Ashraf Alakbarli
95	GK	AZE	Bilal Hajiyev

== Club officials ==
=== Technical staff ===
Current staff
- Manager: (Azerbaijan) Gurban Gurbanov
- Coach: (Azerbaijan) Elchin Rahmanov
- Coach: (Azerbaijan) Mushfig Huseynov
- Coach: (Azerbaijan) Zaur Tagizade
- Coach: (Bulgaria) Chudomir Chokarov
- Goalkeeping coach: (Azerbaijan) Elkhan Hasanov
- Reserve team head coach: (Azerbaijan) Javad Mirzabeyli
- Doctor: (Azerbaijan) Sahhat Rustamzadeh
- Physiotherapist: (Moldova) Ghennadie Chislari
- Physiotherapist: (Turkey) Murat Sahinoglu
- Masseur: (Turkey) Oktay Gursoy
- Masseur: (Azerbaijan) Elshan Aliyev
- Masseur: (Azerbaijan) Rahman Nabiyev
- Social media manager: (Azerbaijan) Mehman Ashrafov
- Administrator: (Azerbaijan) Elshan Hasanov
- Cameraman: (Azerbaijan) Ramin Hajiyev

- Source: Traniers
- Source: Tech stuff

=== Club management ===
Current staff
- President: (Azerbaijan) Tahir Gözel
- Vice president: (Turkey) Fevzihan Aras
- Board Member & Director : (Turkey) Emrah Celikel
- Board member: (Azerbaijan) Asif Asgarov
- Coordinator of youth academy: (Azerbaijan) Aftandil Hajiyev
- Financial manager: (Turkey) Murat Karaman
- Media and public relations: (Azerbaijan) Anar Hajiyev
- Chief accountant: (Azerbaijan) Ali Akberov
- Administratorion: (Azerbaijan) Izzet Mahmudov
- HR specialist: (Azerbaijan) Anar Ismayilov

- Source: Steering
- Source: Management

== Honours ==
Qarabağ has won twelve Azerbaijan Premier League titles, eight Azerbaijan Cup titles and one Azerbaijan Supercup trophy. The club is the first non-Baku based club to have won the Azerbaijan Premier League title. Qarabağ is one of the two teams in Azerbaijan, along with Neftçi PFK which has participated in all Azerbaijan Premier League championships so far.

=== Azerbaijan ===
- Azerbaijan League
  - Winners (12): 1993, 2013–14, 2014–15, 2015–16, 2016–17, 2017–18, 2018–19, 2019–20, 2021–22, 2022–23, 2023–24, 2024–25
  - Runners-up (4): 1993–94, 1996–97, 2012–13, 2020–21, 2025-26
- Azerbaijan Cup
  - Winners (8): 1993, 2005–06, 2008–09, 2014–15, 2015–16, 2016–17, 2021–22, 2023–24
  - Runners-up (4): 1995–96, 1997–98, 1999–2000, 2024–25
- Azerbaijan Supercup
  - Winners (1): 1994

=== USSR ===
- Azerbaijan SSR League
  - Winners (2): 1988, 1990
  - Runners-up (1): 1969
- Azerbaijan SSR Cup
  - Winners (1): 1990

== Individual records ==
Lists of the players with the most caps and top goalscorers for the club (players in bold signifies current Qarabağ player).

=== Top goalscorers ===
As of matches played by 22.11.2026

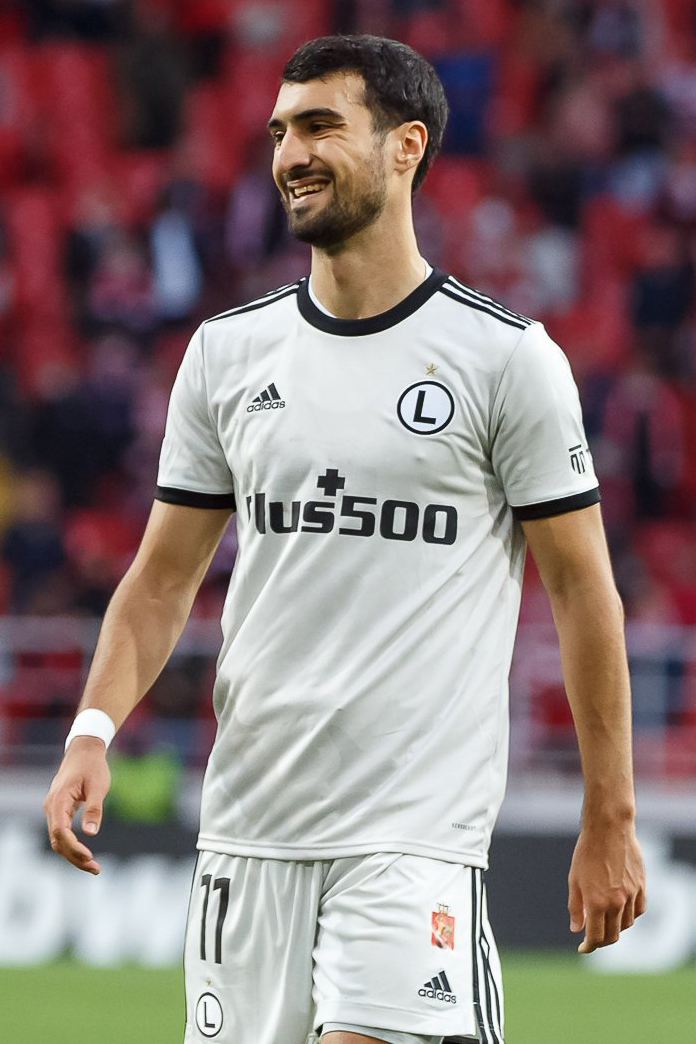
Mahir Emreli is one of the highest goalscoring players for the club.

Rank	Player	Years	League	Cup	Continental	Total
1	(Azerbaijan) Mushfig Huseynov	1989–1999; 2003–2004; 2005–2007	109 (244)	? (?)	2 (12)	**111** (256)
2	(France) Abdellah Zoubir	2018–2026	55 (217)	5 (31)	18 (120)	**78** (368)
3	(Azerbaijan) Mahir Emreli	2015–2021	59 (126)	7 (21)	5 (49)	**71** (216)
4	(Azerbaijan) Richard Almeida	2012–2018; 2018–2019; 2021–2025	51 (256)	5 (31)	8 (91)	**64** (378)
5	(Brazil) Reynaldo	2012–2017; 2019	44 (92)	7 (9)	11 (35)	**62** (139)
6	(Cape Verde) Leandro Andrade	2021–2026	45 (137)	2 (20)	13 (56)	**60** (213)
7	(Azerbaijan) **Musa Gurbanli**	2019–2021; 2021–2023; 2024–present	45 (107)	4 (15)	1 (29)	**50** (151)
8	(Azerbaijan) Samir Musayev	2002–2006	44 (85)	? (?)	2 (4)	**46** (89)
9	(Azerbaijan) Yashar Huseynov	1989–2002	44 (226)	? (?)	0 (6)	**44** (232)
10	(Spain) Dani Quintana	2015–2020	33 (98)	3 (12)	8 (44)	**44** (154)

=== Most appearances ===
As of matches played by 22.11.2026

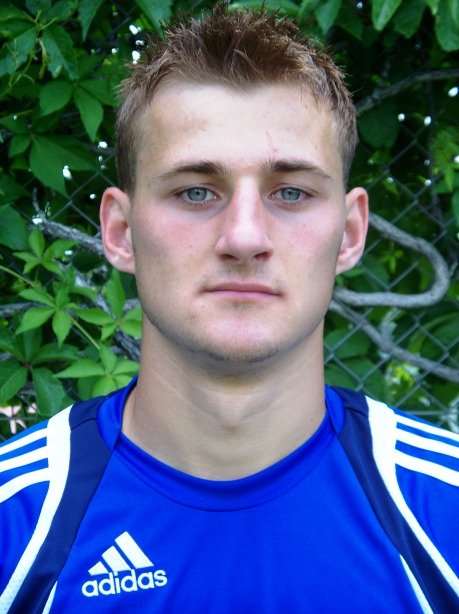
Maksim Medvedev has the most appearances for the club.

Rank	Player	Years	League	Cup	Continental	Total
1	(Azerbaijan) Maksim Medvedev	2006–2024	376 (12)	50 (2)	126 (3)	**552** (17)
2	(Azerbaijan) Qara Qarayev	2008–2023	305 (5)	41 (0)	120 (0)	**466** (5)
3	(Azerbaijan) **Badavi Guseynov**	2013–present	272 (6)	36 (0)	104 (0)	**412** (6)
4	(Azerbaijan) Richard Almeida	2012–2018; 2018–2019; 2021–2025	256 (51)	31 (5)	91 (8)	**378** (64)
5	(France) Abdellah Zoubir	2018–2026	217 (55)	31 (5)	120 (18)	**368** (78)
6	(Azerbaijan) Mushfig Huseynov	1989–1999; 2003–2004; 2005–2007	320 (125)	? (?)	12 (2)	**332** (127)
7	(Azerbaijan) Yashar Huseynov	1989–2002	325 (44)	? (?)	6 (0)	**331** (44)
8	(Albania) Ansi Agolli	2010–2019	224 (3)	24 (0)	69 (1)	**317** (4)
9	(Azerbaijan) Sattar Aliyev	1989; 1990–2004	306 (17)	? (?)	8 (?)	**314** (17)
10	(Azerbaijan) Aslan Kerimov	1993–1997; 2003–2011	268 (12)	? (?)	20 (0)	**288** (12)

== Notable managers ==
Information correct as of matches played by 28 October 2022. Only competitive matches are counted.

Name	Nat.	From	To	P	W	D	L	GS	GA	%W	Honours	Notes
Elbrus Abbasov	Soviet Union	1988, 1990		N/A	N/A	N/A	N/A	N/A	N/A	N/A	Azerbaijan SSR League (2); Azerbaijan SSR Cup	
Aghasalim Mirjavadov	Azerbaijan	1993	1994	N/A	N/A	N/A	N/A	N/A	N/A	N/A	Azerbaijan Premier League; Azerbaijan Cup; Azerbaijan Supercup	
Boyukagha Aghayev	Azerbaijan	2006		N/A	N/A	N/A	N/A	N/A	N/A	N/A	Azerbaijan Cup	
Gurban Gurbanov	Azerbaijan	2008	Present	406	226	106	74	588	301	55.67	Azerbaijan Premier League (11); Azerbaijan Cup (6)	

Notes: P – Total of played matches W – Won matches D – Drawn matches L – Lost matches GS – Goal scored GA – Goals against
%W – Percentage of matches won

Nationality is indicated by the corresponding FIFA country code(s).

== Transfers ==
The top transfer was agreed in July 2026 when 24 years old Colombian forward Camilo Durán moved to Celtic for a fee €5.50 million.

=== Record transfers ===
Rank	Player	To	Fee	Year
1.	(Colombia) Camilo Durán	(Scotland) Celtic	€5.50 million	2026
2.	(Brazil) Juninho	(Brazil) Flamengo	€5.00 million	2025
3.	(Cape Verde) Leandro Andrade	(Ukraine) Polissya	€3.00 million	2026
4.	(Azerbaijan) Nariman Akhundzade	(United States) Columbus Crew	€2.50 million	2026
5.	(Brazil) Kady Borges	(Russia) Krasnodar	€2.00 million	2023
6.	(Senegal) Ibrahima Wadji	(France) Saint-Étienne	€1.00 million	2022
7.	(Azerbaijan) Shakhruddin Magomedaliyev	(Turkey) Adana Demirspor	€0.90 million	2023
8.	(South Africa) Dino Ndlovu	(China) Zhejiang Professional	€0.65 million	2018
9.	(Georgia (country)) Luka Gugeshashvili	(Greece) Panserraikos	€0.55 million	2024
10.	(Azerbaijan) Musa Qurbanlı	(Sweden) Djurgarden	€0.50 million	2023

== In popular culture ==
Qarabağ is featured on the football simulation game Pro Evolution Soccer 2015 and 2016 and were later featured on FC 26

== Ban for hate speech ==
In October 2020, amid the Nagorno-Karabakh war, the Armenian Football Federation called for sanctions against Qarabağ after the club's PR and media manager Nurlan Ibrahimov posted a hate message on a social media network calling to "kill all the Armenians, old and young, without distinction". UEFA announced a temporary suspension of the club's official from any football-related activity for "racist and other discriminatory conduct” targeting Armenians. Qarabag issued a statement saying Ibrahimov had been traumatised by watching the news of the Ganja and Barda missile attacks, while also urging its employees to "refrain from such sharing in this sensitive period, adhere to the principles of humanism and fully comply with the laws of our state". Ibrahimov was punished in an administrative manner for the calls he made expressing cruelty against another nation and inciting national, racial or religious hatred while behaving emotionally on social network. On November 26, UEFA officially banned the Qarabağ official for life and fined the club €100,000. Shortly after the UEFA sanction, Ibrahimov was declared wanted in Armenia.
