= Rasim Kara =

Turkish football player and manager (born 1950)

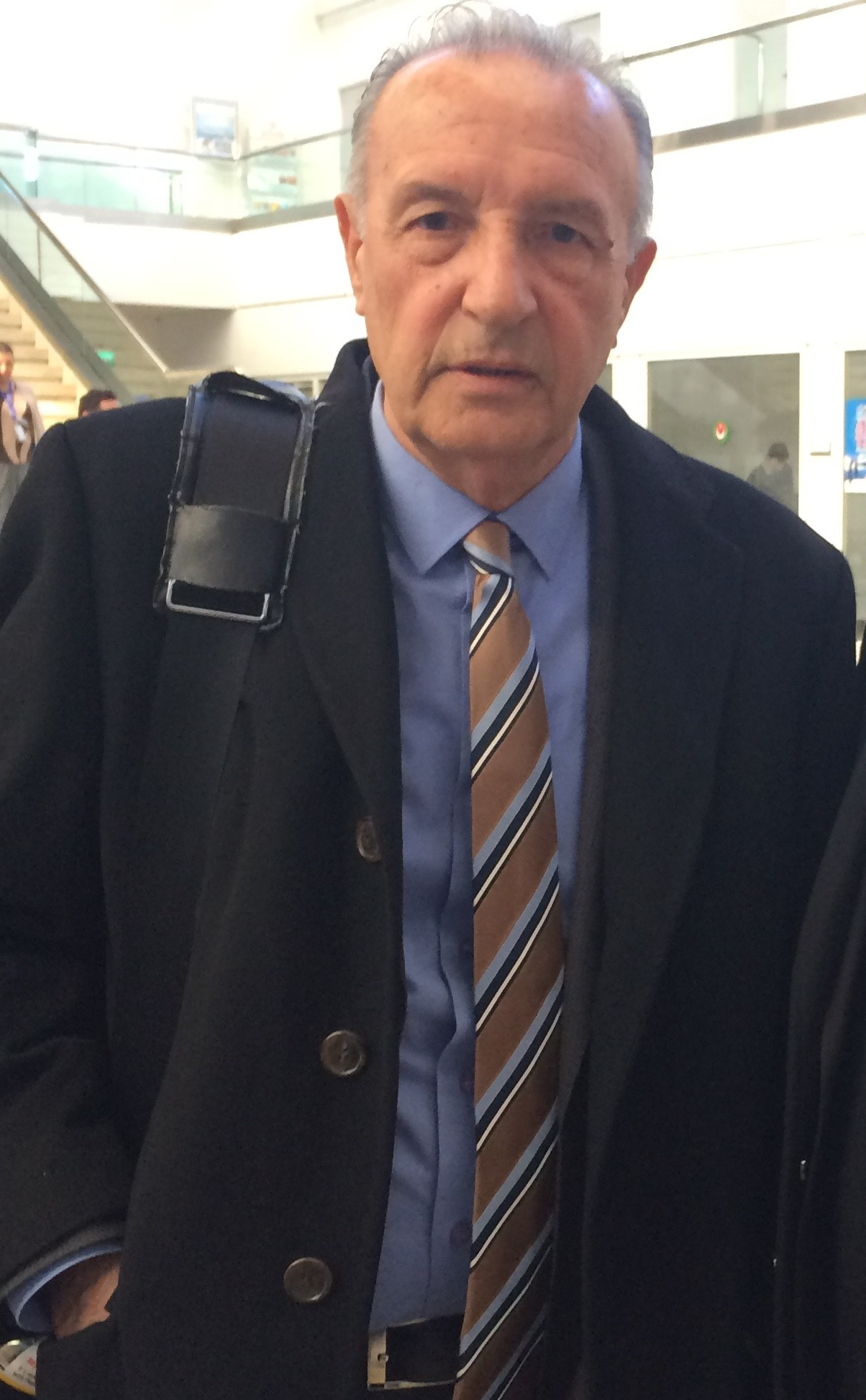

Personal information
- Date of birth: 10 June 1950 (age 76)
- Place of birth: Eskişehir, Turkey
- Position: Goalkeeper

Youth career
- Eskişehir Işıkspor

Senior career*
Years	Team	Apps	(Gls)
–1972	Uşakspor		
1972–1976	Bursaspor	76	(1)
1976–1984	Beşiktaş	130	(3)

International career
1975–1978	Turkey	9	(0)

Managerial career
- 1986: Antalyaspor (assistant)
- 1986: Antalyaspor
- 1988–1989: Uzunköprüspor
- 1990–1996: Turkey (assistant)
- 1996–1997: Beşiktaş
- 1997–1998: Bursaspor
- 1998–1999: Dardanelspor
- 2000: Çaykur Rizespor
- 2000: Kocaelispor
- 2001–2002: Yozgatspor
- 2002–2003: Ottawa Wizards
- 2005–2006: Khazar Lankaran
- 2006–2007: Qarabağ
- 2008: Khazar Lankaran
- * Club domestic league appearances and goals

Rasim Kara (born 10 June 1950) is a Turkish former football player and manager. A goalkeeper, he played for Bursaspor, Beşiktaş and the Turkey national team.

== Playing career ==
Born in Eskişehir, Kara began playing as a goalkeeper with the youth side of Eskişehir Işıkspor. He would later join Uşakspor and Bursaspor. During his tenure with Bursaspor, he was promoted to the national team. He reached his peak of career with joining Beşiktaş in the 1975–76 season where he will have spent his nine years. He achieved the Turkish League title in the 1981–82 season. Kara retired football in 1984.

Kara played for Turkey in the UEFA Euro 1976 qualifying rounds.

== Managerial career ==
Kara trained Antalyaspor prior to his vice-coaching tasks with Sepp Piontek and Fatih Terim subsequently for the Turkey national team. Most notably, he contributed the success of team accessing the Euro 96 for the very first time in history. Following this achievement, he was hired by Beşiktaş as team coach.

Whilst his one-season period with Beşiktaş in 1996–97, Kara showed some decent displays as team had competed for the title for the last week just after Galatasaray. Team also broke the "top average scoring per year" record, with creating one of the best performances in European cups. Despite this successful season, Kara had to leave the team. After that, he owned Bursaspor, Çanakkale Dardanelspor, Çaykur Rizespor, Kocaelispor within short terms.

Kara also coached abroad. He coached Canadian side Ottawa Wizards and led the team for a league title. Then he moved to Azerbaijan, east neighbour of Turkey for coaching FK Khazar Lenkoran. He was in charge for two years there before he signed for FK Qarabağ. He unexpectedly left FK Qarabağ a week before the start of the 2008–09 season, despite having one-year contract with the club and moved back to his former team FK Khazar Lenkoran. Has been penalized for his attitude by Football Federation of Azerbaijan AFFA and forced to pay compensation to his former club.

== Honours ==
Individual

- Beşiktaş J.K. Squads of Century (Bronze Team)
