= Qarabağ FK in European football =

Overview of Qarabağ FK's role in European football

Qarabağ FK in European Football
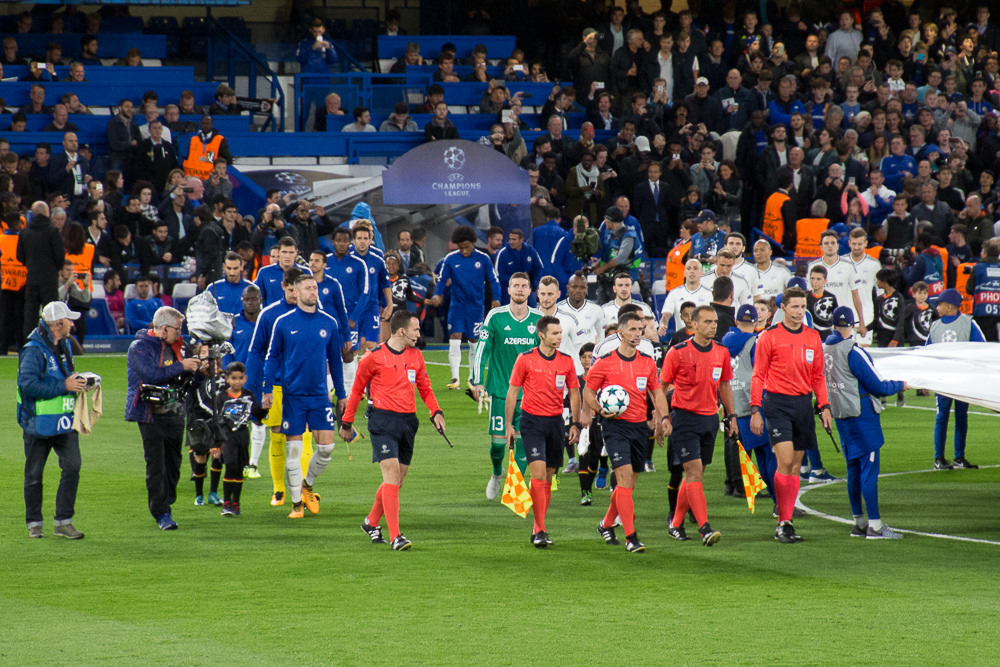
- Qarabağ playing against Chelsea at Stamford Bridge during the Champions League
- Club: Qarabağ FK
- Seasons played: 23
- Most appearances: Maksim Medvedev (126)
- Top scorer: Abdellah Zoubir (18)
- First entry: 1996–97 UEFA Cup Winners' Cup
- Latest entry: 2026–27 UEFA Europa League

Qarabağ FK has participated in fifteen editions of the club competitions governed by UEFA, the chief authority for football across Europe. These include five seasons in the Champions League, ten seasons in the UEFA Cup and Europa League, two seasons in the Cup Winners' Cup and one season in the Intertoto Cup. Qarabağ has played three times in the Europa League after qualifying via the Champions League. Counting all of the 86 games the side have played in UEFA competitions since their first entry into the Cup Winners' Cup in the 1996–97 season, the team's record stands at 32 wins, 22 draws and 32 defeats.

The club plays its home matches at Tofiq Bahramov Republican Stadium, an all-seater stadium in Baku. Since the last rebuilding in 2012, it can host 31,200 spectators. The record attendance for Qarabağ in a European match occurred 30 July 2014, in a 2014–15 UEFA Champions League third qualifying round match attended by 32,000 fans against Red Bull Salzburg which ended with a 2–1 win for the Qarabağ. Qarabağ biggest wins is 5–0 against Samtredia in the 2017–18 UEFA Champions League qualification, while the biggest defeats is 0–6 against Copenhagen in the 1998–99 UEFA Cup Winners' Cup and Montpellier in the 1999 UEFA Intertoto Cup. Qarabağ has played Metalurg Skopje, Twente and Copenhagen four times, more than any other team.

In 2017, after beating Copenhagen 2–2 (on away goals) in the play-off round of the UEFA Champions League, Qarabağ became the first Azerbaijani club to reach the group stage. They were drawn in Group C alongside Chelsea, Atlético Madrid and Roma, where they managed to obtain two points in six games after two draws and four losses.

The 2021–22 season saw Qarabağ progress from the group stage of a European competition for the first time, finishing second place in their UEFA Europa Conference League group after six matches. In the 2023–24 UEFA Europa League, Qarabağ progressed in second place in a group containing German club Bayer Leverkusen, Swedish club BK Häcken, and Norwegian club Molde. After progressing to the knockout round play-offs, they were drawn against Braga of Portugal. In the away leg, Qarabağ scored four goals to win 4–2 in Portugal, the first time an Azerbaijani club had defeated a Portuguese club in an official UEFA competition.

== Key ==
- S = Seasons
- Pld = Matches played
- W = Matches won
- D = Matches drawn
- L = Matches lost
- GF = Goals for
- GA = Goals against
- a.e.t. = Match determined after extra time
- p = Match determined by penalty shoot-out
- a = Match determined by away goals rule
- QF = Quarter-finals
- KO = Knockout round
- Group = Group stage
- Group 2 = Second group stage
- PO = Play-off round
- RO16 = Round of 16
- R3 = Round 3
- R2 = Round 2
- R1 = Round 1
- Q3 = Third qualification round
- Q2 = Second qualification round
- Q1 = First qualification round
- QR = Qualification round

== Matches ==
The following is a complete list of matches played by Qarabağ in UEFA tournaments. It includes the season, tournament, the stage, the opponent club and the scores in home and away, with Qarabağ's score noted first. It is up to date as of 27.08.2026.

List of Qarabağ FK matches in European football
Season	Tournament	Round	Opponent	Home	Away	Aggregate	Ref.
1996–97	Cup Winners' Cup	QR	(Finland) MyPa	0:1	1:1	1:2 (a.e.t.)	
1997–98	UEFA Cup	Q1	(Czech Republic) Jablonec	0:3	0:5	0:8	
1998–99	Cup Winners' Cup	QR	(Denmark) Copenhagen	0:4	0:6	0:10	
1999	Intertoto Cup	R1	(Israel) Maccabi Haifa	0:1	2:1	2:2 (a)	
1999	Intertoto Cup	R2	(France) Montpellier	0:3	0:6	0:9	
2004–05	UEFA Cup	Q1	(Slovakia) Dukla Banská Bystrica	0:1	0:3	0:4	
2006–07	UEFA Cup	Q2	(Moldova) Zimbru Chișinău	1:2	1:1	2:3 (a.e.t.)	
2009–10	Europa League	Q2	(Norway) Rosenborg	1:0	0:0	1:0	
2009–10	Europa League	Q3	(Finland) Honka	2:1	1:0	3:1	
2009–10	Europa League	PO	(Netherlands) Twente	0:0	1:3	1:3	
2010–11	Europa League	Q1	(North Macedonia) Metalurg Skopje	4:1	1:1	5:2	
2010–11	Europa League	Q2	(Northern Ireland) Portadown	1:1	2:1	3:2	
2010–11	Europa League	Q3	(Poland) Wisła Kraków	3:2	1:0	4:2	
2010–11	Europa League	PO	(Germany) Borussia Dortmund	0:1	0:4	0:5	
2011–12	Europa League	Q1	(Lithuania) Banga Gargždai	3:0	4:0	7:0	
2011–12	Europa League	Q2	(Faroe Islands) EB/Streymur	0:0	1:1	1:1 (a)	
2011–12	Europa League	Q3	(Belgium) Club Brugge	1:0	1:4	2:4	
2013–14	Europa League	Q1	(North Macedonia) Metalurg Skopje	1:0	1:0	2:0	
2013–14	Europa League	Q2	(Poland) Piast Gliwice	2:1	2:2	4:3 (a.e.t.)	
2013–14	Europa League	Q3	(Sweden) Gefle IF	1:0	2:0	3:0	
2013–14	Europa League	PO	(Germany) Eintracht Frankfurt	0:2	1:2	1:4	
2014–15	Champions League	Q2	(Malta) Valletta	4:0	1:0	5:0	
2014–15	Champions League	Q3	(Austria) Red Bull Salzburg	2:1	0:2	2:3	
2014–15	Europa League	PO	(Netherlands) Twente	0:0	1:1	1:1 (a)	
2014–15	Europa League	Group	(France) Saint-Étienne	0:0	1:1	3rd place	
2014–15	Europa League	Group	(Italy) Internazionale	0:0	0:2	3rd place	
2014–15	Europa League	Group	(Ukraine) Dnipro Dnipropetrovsk	1:2	1:0	3rd place	
2015–16	Champions League	Q2	(Montenegro) Rudar Pljevlja	0:0	1:0	1:0	
2015–16	Champions League	Q3	(Scotland) Celtic	0:0	0:1	0:1	
2015–16	Europa League	PO	(Switzerland) Young Boys	3:0	1:0	4:0	
2015–16	Europa League	Group	(Belgium) Anderlecht	1:0	1:2	4th place	
2015–16	Europa League	Group	(France) Monaco	1:1	0:1	4th place	
2015–16	Europa League	Group	(England) Tottenham Hotspur	0:1	1:3	4th place	
2016–17	Champions League	Q2	(Luxembourg) F91 Dudelange	2:0	1:1	3:1	
2016–17	Champions League	Q3	(Czech Republic) Viktoria Plzeň	1:1	0:0	1:1 (a)	
2016–17	Europa League	PO	(Sweden) IFK Göteborg	3:0	0:1	3:1	
2016–17	Europa League	Group	(Italy) Fiorentina	1:2	1:5	3rd place	
2016–17	Europa League	Group	(Greece) PAOK	2:0	1:0	3rd place	
2016–17	Europa League	Group	(Czech Republic) Slovan Liberec	2:2	0:3	3rd place	
2017–18	Champions League	Q2	(Georgia (country)) Samtredia	5:0	1:0	6:0	
2017–18	Champions League	Q3	(Moldova) Sheriff Tiraspol	0:0	2:1	2:1	
2017–18	Champions League	PO	(Denmark) Copenhagen	1:0	1:2	2:2 (a)	
2017–18	Champions League	Group	(Italy) Roma	1:2	0:1	4th place	
2017–18	Champions League	Group	(Spain) Atlético Madrid	0:0	1:1	4th place	
2017–18	Champions League	Group	(England) Chelsea	0:4	0:6	4th place	
2018–19	Champions League	Q1	(Slovenia) Olimpija Ljubljana	0:0	1:0	1:0	
2018–19	Champions League	Q2	(Albania) Kukësi	3:0	0:0	3:0	
2018–19	Champions League	Q3	(Belarus) BATE Borisov	0:1	1:1	1:2	
2018–19	Europa League	PO	(Moldova) Sheriff Tiraspol	3:0	0:1	3:1	
2018–19	Europa League	Group	(England) Arsenal	0:3	0:1	4th place	
2018–19	Europa League	Group	(Portugal) Sporting CP	1:6	0:2	4th place	
2018–19	Europa League	Group	(Ukraine) Vorskla Poltava	0:1	1:0	4th place	
2019–20	Champions League	Q1	(Albania) Partizani	2:0	0:0	2:0	
2019–20	Champions League	Q2	(Republic of Ireland) Dundalk	3:0	1:1	4:1	
2019–20	Champions League	Q3	(Cyprus) APOEL	0:2	2:1	2:3	
2019–20	Europa League	PO	(Northern Ireland) Linfield	2:1	2:3	4:4 (a)	
2019–20	Europa League	Group	(Spain) Sevilla	0:3	0:2	3rd place	
2019–20	Europa League	Group	(Cyprus) APOEL	2:2	1:2	3rd place	
2019–20	Europa League	Group	(Luxembourg) F91 Dudelange	1:1	4:1	3rd place	
2020–21	Champions League	Q1	(North Macedonia) Sileks	4:0	N/A	N/A	
2020–21	Champions League	Q2	(Moldova) Sheriff Tiraspol	2:1	N/A	N/A	
2020–21	Champions League	Q3	(Norway) Molde	0:0 (5–6 p)	N/A	N/A	
2020–21	Europa League	PO	(Poland) Legia Warsaw	N/A	3:0	N/A	
2020–21	Europa League	Group	(Spain) Villarreal	1:3	0:3	4th place	
2020–21	Europa League	Group	(Israel) Maccabi Tel Aviv	1:1	0:1	4th place	
2020–21	Europa League	Group	(Turkey) Sivasspor	2:3	0:2	4th place	
2021–22	Europa Conference League	Q2	(Israel) Ashdod	0:0	1:0	1:0	
2021–22	Europa Conference League	Q3	(Cyprus) AEL Limassol	1:0	1:1	2:1	
2021–22	Europa Conference League	PO	(Scotland) Aberdeen	1:0	3:1	4:1	
2021–22	Europa Conference League	Group	(Switzerland) Basel	0:0	0:3	2nd place	
2021–22	Europa Conference League	Group	(Kazakhstan) Kairat	2:1	2:1	2nd place	
2021–22	Europa Conference League	Group	(Cyprus) Omonia	2:2	4:1	2nd place	
2021–22	Europa Conference League	KPO	(France) Marseille	0:3	1:3	1:6	
2022–23	Champions League	Q1	(Poland) Lech Poznań	5:1	0:1	5:2	
2022–23	Champions League	Q2	(Switzerland) Zürich	3:2	2:2	5:4	
2022–23	Champions League	Q3	(Hungary) Ferencváros	1:1	3:1	4:2	
2022–23	Champions League	PO	(Czech Republic) Viktoria Plzeň	0:0	1:2	1:2	
2022–23	Europa League	Group	(Germany) SC Freiburg	1:1	1:2	3rd place	
2022–23	Europa League	Group	(France) Nantes	3:0	1:2	3rd place	
2022–23	Europa League	Group	(Greece) Olympiacos	0:0	3:0	3rd place	
2022–23	Europa Conference League	KPO	(Belgium) Gent	1:0	0:1	1:1 (p)	
2023–24	Champions League	Q1	(Gibraltar) Lincoln Red Imps	4:0	2:1	6:1	
2023–24	Champions League	Q2	(Poland) Raków Częstochowa	1:1	2:3	3:4	
2023–24	Europa League	Q3	(Finland) HJK	2:1	2:1	4:2	
2023–24	Europa League	PO	(Slovenia) Olimpija Ljubljana	1:1	2:0	3:1	
2023–24	Europa League	Group	(Germany) Bayer Leverkusen	0:1	1:5	2nd place	
2023–24	Europa League	Group	(Sweden) BK Häcken	2:1	1:0	2nd place	
2023–24	Europa League	Group	(Norway) Molde	1:0	2:2	2nd place	
2023–24	Europa League	KPO	(Portugal) Braga	2:3	4:2	6:5 (a.e.t.)	
2023–24	Europa League	RO16	(Germany) Bayer Leverkusen	2:2	2:3	4:5	
2024–25	Champions League	Q2	(Gibraltar) Lincoln Red Imps	5:0	2:0	7:0	
2024–25	Champions League	Q3	(Bulgaria) Ludogorets Razgrad	1:2	7:2	8:4 (a.e.t.)	
2024–25	Champions League	PO	(Croatia) Dinamo Zagreb	0:3	0:2	0:5	
2024–25	Europa League	League phase	(England) Tottenham Hotspur	N/A	0:3	36th place	
2024–25	Europa League	League phase	(Sweden) Malmö FF	1:2	N/A	36th place	
2024–25	Europa League	League phase	(Netherlands) Ajax	0:3	N/A	36th place	
2024–25	Europa League	League phase	(Norway) Bodø/Glimt	N/A	2:1	36th place	
2024–25	Europa League	League phase	(France) Lyon	1:4	N/A	36th place	
2024–25	Europa League	League phase	(Sweden) IF Elfsborg	N/A	0:1	36th place	
2024–25	Europa League	League phase	(Romania) FCSB	2:3	N/A	36th place	
2024–25	Europa League	League phase	(Greece) Olympiacos	N/A	0:3	36th place	
2025–26	Champions League	Q2	(Republic of Ireland) Shelbourne	1:0	3:0	4:0	
2025–26	Champions League	Q3	(North Macedonia) Shkëndija	5:1	1:0	6:1	
2025–26	Champions League	PO	(Hungary) Ferencváros	2:3	3:1	5:4	
2025–26	Champions League	League phase	(Portugal) Benfica	N/A	3:2	22nd place	
2025–26	Champions League	League phase	(Denmark) Copenhagen	2:0	N/A	22nd place	
2025–26	Champions League	League phase	(Spain) Athletic Bilbao	N/A	1:3	22nd place	
2025–26	Champions League	League phase	(England) Chelsea	2:2	N/A	22nd place	
2025–26	Champions League	League phase	(Italy) Napoli	N/A	0:2	22nd place	
2025–26	Champions League	League phase	(Netherlands) Ajax	2:4	N/A	22nd place	
2025–26	Champions League	League phase	(Germany) Eintracht Frankfurt	3:2	N/A	22nd place	
2025–26	Champions League	League phase	(England) Liverpool	N/A	0:6	22nd place	
2025–26	Champions League	KPO	(England) Newcastle United	1:6	2:3	3:9	
2026–27	Europa League	Q1	(Iceland) Vestri	3:0	3:0	6:0	
2026–27	Europa League	Q2	(Bulgaria) CSKA	0:0	0:0	4:5 (p)	
2026–27	Conference League	Q3	(Ukraine) Dynamo Kyiv	2:0	0:1	2:1	
2026–27	Conference League	PO	(Netherlands) Twente	1:4	1:0	2:4	

== European record ==
=== By competition ===
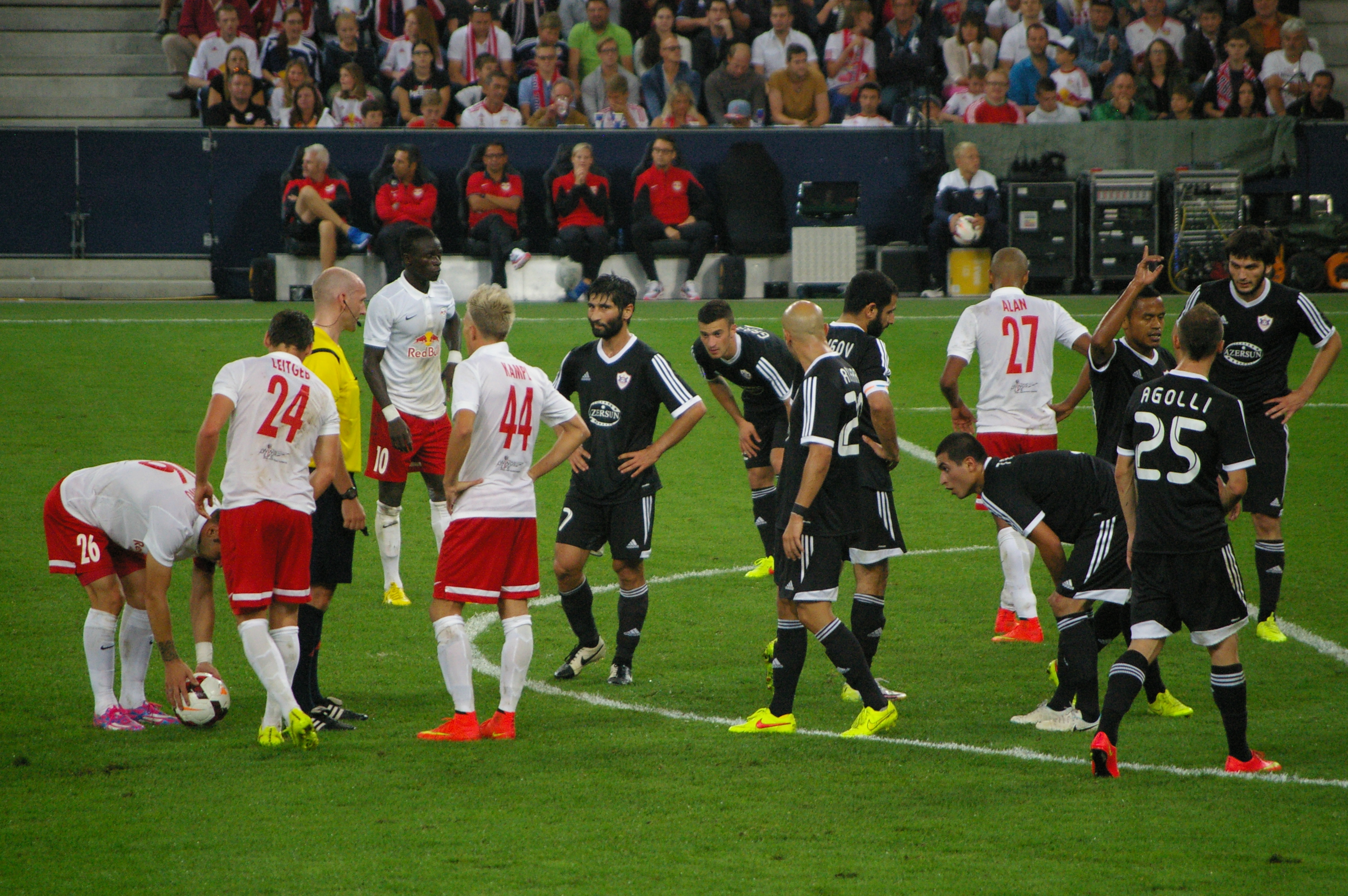
Qarabağ playing against Red Bull Salzburg at Red Bull Arena during the 2014–15 UEFA Champions League

The following is a list of the all-time statistics from Qarabağ's games in the four UEFA tournaments it has participated in, as well as the overall total. The list contains the tournament, the number of matches played (Pld), won (W), drawn (D) and lost (L). The number of goals for (GF), goals against (GA), goal difference (GD) and the percentage of matches won (Win%). The statistics include qualification matches and is up to date as of the 2025–26 season. The statistics also include goals scored during extra time where applicable; in these games, the result given is the result at the end of extra time.

As of match played 27.08.2026

Tournament	Pld	W	D	L	GF	GA	GD	Win%
UEFA Champions League	73	32	19	22	113	89	+24	43.84
UEFA Cup / UEFA Europa League	113	39	25	49	130	158	−28	34.51
UEFA Europa Conference League	20	10	4	6	23	22	+1	50.00
UEFA Cup Winners' Cup	4	0	1	3	1	12	−11	0.00
UEFA Intertoto Cup	4	1	0	3	2	11	−9	25.00
Total	214	82	49	83	269	292	−23	38.32

=== By season ===
As of match played 27.08.2026

Season	Pld	W	D	L	GF	GA	GD	Win%
1996–97	2	0	1	1	1	2	−1	0.00
1997–98	2	0	0	2	0	8	−8	0.00
1998–99	2	0	0	2	0	10	−10	0.00
1999–2000	4	1	0	3	2	11	−9	25.00
2004–05	2	0	0	2	0	4	−4	0.00
2006–07	2	0	1	1	2	3	−1	0.00
2009–10	6	3	2	1	5	4	+1	50.00
2010–11	8	4	2	2	12	11	+1	50.00
2011–12	6	3	2	1	10	5	+5	50.00
2013–14	8	5	1	2	10	7	+3	62.50
2014–15	12	4	5	3	11	9	+2	33.33
2015–16	12	4	3	5	9	9	+0	33.33
2016–17	12	4	4	4	14	15	−1	33.33
2017–18	12	4	3	5	12	17	−5	33.33
2018–19	14	4	3	7	10	16	−6	28.57
2019–20	14	5	4	5	20	19	+1	35.71
2020–21	10	3	2	5	13	14	−1	30.00
2021–22	14	7	4	3	18	16	+2	50.00
2022–23	16	6	5	5	25	16	+9	37.50
2023–24	18	9	4	5	33	27	+6	50.00
2024–25	14	4	0	10	21	29	−8	28.57
2025–26	16	8	1	7	31	35	−4	50.00
2026–27	8	4	2	2	10	5	+5	50.00

=== By opponent club nationality ===
As of match played 27.08.2026

Country	Club	Pld	W	D	L	GF	GA	GD
Albania	Kukësi	2	1	1	0	3	0	+3
Albania	Partizani	2	1	1	0	2	0	+2
Subtotal		4	2	2	0	5	0	+5
Austria	Red Bull Salzburg	2	1	0	1	2	3	–1
Subtotal		2	1	0	1	2	3	–1
Belarus	BATE Borisov	2	0	1	1	1	2	–1
Bulgaria	Ludogorets Razgrad	2	1	0	1	8	4	+4
Bulgaria	CSKA	2	0	2	0	0	0	0
Subtotal		4	1	2	1	8	4	+4
Belgium	Anderlecht	2	1	0	1	2	2	0
Belgium	Club Brugge	2	1	0	1	2	4	–2
Belgium	Gent	2	1	0	1	1	1	0
Subtotal		6	3	0	3	5	7	–2
Croatia	Dinamo Zagreb	2	0	0	2	0	5	–5
Subtotal		2	0	0	2	0	5	–5
Cyprus	AEL Limassol	2	1	1	0	2	1	+1
Cyprus	APOEL	4	1	1	2	5	7	–2
Cyprus	Omonia	2	1	1	0	6	3	+3
Subtotal		8	3	3	2	13	11	+2
Czech Republic	Jablonec	2	0	0	2	0	8	–8
Czech Republic	Slovan Liberec	2	0	1	1	2	5	–3
Czech Republic	Viktoria Plzeň	4	0	3	1	2	3	–1
Subtotal		8	0	4	4	1	16	–12
Denmark	Copenhagen	5	2	0	3	4	12	–8
Subtotal		5	2	0	3	4	12	–8
England	Arsenal	2	0	0	2	0	4	–4
England	Chelsea	3	0	1	2	2	12	–10
England	Liverpool	1	0	0	1	0	6	–6
England	Newcastle United	2	0	0	2	3	9	–6
England	Tottenham Hotspur	3	0	0	3	1	7	–6
Subtotal		11	0	1	10	6	38	–32
Faroe Islands	EB/Streymur	2	0	2	0	1	1	0
Subtotal		2	0	2	0	1	1	0
Finland	HJK	2	2	0	0	4	2	+2
Finland	Honka	2	2	0	0	3	1	+2
Finland	MyPa	2	0	1	1	1	2	–1
Subtotal		6	4	1	1	8	6	+2
France	Lyon	1	0	0	1	1	4	–3
France	Marseille	2	0	0	2	1	6	–5
France	Monaco	2	0	1	1	1	2	–1
France	Montpellier	2	0	0	2	0	9	–9
France	Nantes	2	1	0	1	4	2	+2
France	Saint-Étienne	2	0	2	0	1	1	0
Subtotal		11	1	3	7	8	24	–16
Germany	Bayer Leverkusen	4	0	1	3	5	11	–6
Germany	Borussia Dortmund	2	0	0	2	0	5	–5
Germany	Eintracht Frankfurt	3	1	0	2	4	6	–2
Germany	SC Freiburg	2	0	1	1	2	3	–1
Subtotal		11	1	2	8	11	25	–14
Gibraltar	Lincoln Red Imps	4	4	0	0	13	1	+12
Subtotal		4	4	0	0	13	1	+12
(Georgia (country)) Georgia	Samtredia	2	2	0	0	6	0	+6
Subtotal		2	2	0	0	6	0	+6
Greece	Olympiacos	3	1	1	1	3	3	0
Greece	PAOK	2	2	0	0	3	0	+3
Subtotal		5	3	1	1	6	3	+3
Hungary	Ferencváros	4	2	1	1	9	6	+3
Subtotal		4	2	1	1	9	6	+3
Iceland	Vestri	2	2	0	0	6	0	+6
Subtotal		2	2	0	0	6	0	+6
(Republic of Ireland) Ireland	Dundalk	2	1	1	0	4	1	+3
(Republic of Ireland) Ireland	Shelbourne	2	2	0	0	4	0	+4
Subtotal		4	3	1	0	8	1	+7
Israel	Ashdod	2	1	1	0	1	0	+1
Israel	Maccabi Haifa	2	1	0	1	2	2	0
Israel	Maccabi Tel Aviv	2	0	1	1	1	2	–1
Subtotal		6	2	2	2	4	4	0
Italy	Fiorentina	2	0	0	2	2	7	–5
Italy	Inter Milan	2	0	1	1	0	2	–2
Italy	Napoli	1	0	0	1	0	2	–2
Italy	Roma	2	0	0	2	1	3	–2
Subtotal		7	0	1	6	3	14	–11
Kazakhstan	Kairat	2	2	0	0	4	2	+2
Subtotal		2	2	0	0	4	2	+2
Lithuania	Banga Gargždai	2	2	0	0	7	0	+7
Subtotal		2	2	0	0	7	0	+7
Luxembourg	F91 Dudelange	4	2	2	0	8	3	+5
Subtotal		4	2	2	0	8	3	+5
Malta	Valletta	2	2	0	0	5	0	+5
Subtotal		2	2	0	0	5	0	+5
Moldova	Sheriff Tiraspol	5	3	1	1	7	3	+4
Moldova	Zimbru Chișinău	2	0	1	1	2	3	–1
Subtotal		7	3	2	2	9	6	+3
Montenegro	Rudar Pljevlja	2	1	1	0	1	0	+1
Subtotal		2	1	1	0	1	0	+1
Netherlands	Ajax	2	0	0	2	2	7	–5
Netherlands	Twente	6	1	3	4	4	8	–4
Subtotal		8	1	3	4	6	15	–9
Northern Ireland	Linfield	2	1	0	1	4	4	0
Northern Ireland	Portadown	2	1	1	0	3	2	+1
Subtotal		4	2	1	1	7	6	+1
Norway	Bodø/Glimt	1	1	0	0	2	1	+1
Norway	Molde	3	1	2	0	3	2	+1
Norway	Rosenborg	2	1	1	0	1	0	+1
Subtotal		6	3	3	0	6	3	+3
Romania	FCSB	1	0	0	1	2	3	−1
Subtotal		1	0	0	1	2	3	−1
Poland	Lech Poznań	2	1	0	1	5	2	+3
Poland	Legia Warsaw	1	1	0	0	3	0	+3
Poland	Piast Gliwice	2	1	1	0	4	3	+1
Poland	Raków Częstochowa	2	0	1	1	3	4	–1
Poland	Wisła Kraków	2	2	0	0	4	2	+2
Subtotal		9	5	2	2	19	11	+8
Portugal	Benfica	1	1	0	0	3	2	+1
Portugal	Braga	2	1	0	1	6	5	+1
Portugal	Sporting CP	2	0	0	2	1	8	–7
Subtotal		5	2	0	3	10	15	–5
(North Macedonia) Republic of Macedonia	Metalurg Skopje	4	3	1	0	7	2	+5
(North Macedonia) Republic of Macedonia	Shkëndija	2	2	0	0	6	1	+5
(North Macedonia) Republic of Macedonia	Sileks	1	1	0	0	4	0	+4
Subtotal		7	6	1	0	17	3	+13
Scotland	Aberdeen	2	2	0	0	4	1	+3
Scotland	Celtic	2	0	1	1	0	1	–1
Subtotal		4	2	1	1	4	2	+2
Slovakia	Dukla Banská Bystrica	2	0	0	2	0	4	–4
Subtotal		2	0	0	2	0	4	–4
Slovenia	Olimpija Ljubljana	4	2	2	0	4	1	+3
Subtotal		4	2	2	0	4	1	+3
Spain	Athletic Bilbao	1	0	0	1	1	3	–2
Spain	Atlético Madrid	2	0	2	0	1	1	0
Spain	Sevilla	2	0	0	2	0	5	–5
Spain	Villarreal	2	0	0	2	1	6	–5
Subtotal		7	0	2	5	3	15	–12
Sweden	IF Elfsborg	1	0	0	1	0	1	–1
Sweden	Gefle IF	2	2	0	0	3	0	+3
Sweden	IFK Göteborg	2	1	0	1	3	1	+2
Sweden	BK Häcken	2	2	0	0	3	1	+2
Sweden	Malmö FF	1	0	0	1	1	2	–1
Subtotal		8	5	0	3	10	5	+5
Switzerland	Basel	2	0	1	1	0	3	–3
Switzerland	Young Boys	2	2	0	0	4	0	+4
Switzerland	Zürich	2	1	1	0	5	4	+1
Subtotal		6	3	2	1	9	7	+2
Turkey	Sivasspor	2	0	0	2	2	5	−3
Subtotal		2	0	0	2	2	5	−3
Ukraine	Dnipro	2	1	0	1	2	2	0
Ukraine	Vorskla Poltava	2	1	0	1	1	1	0
Ukraine	Dinamo K	2	1	0	1	2	1	+1
Subtotal		6	3	0	3	5	4	+1
Total		214	82	49	83	269	292	–23

=== By club ===
The following list details Qarabağ FK's all-time record against clubs they have met one or more times in European competition. The club and its country are given, as well as the number of games played (Pld), won by Qarabağ (W), drawn (D) and lost by Qarabağ (L), goals for Qarabağ (GF), goals against Qarabağ (GA), Qarabağ 's goal difference (GD), and their win percentages. Statistics are correct as of the 2026–27 season and include goals scored during extra time where applicable; in these games, the result given is the result at the end of extra time.

As of match played 27.08.2026

Positive balance (more wins than losses)
Neutral balance (as many wins as losses)
Negative balance (more losses than wins)

Club	Played	Won	Drew	Lost	GF	GA	GD	Win%
(Cyprus) AEL Limassol	2	1	1	0	2	1	+1	50.00
(Netherlands) Ajax	2	0	0	2	2	7	−5	0.00
(Cyprus) APOEL	4	1	1	2	5	7	−2	25.00
(Scotland) Aberdeen	2	2	0	0	4	1	+3	100.00
(Belgium) Anderlecht	2	1	0	1	2	2	+0	50.00
(England) Arsenal	2	0	0	2	0	4	−4	0.00
(Israel) Ashdod	2	1	1	0	1	0	+1	50.00
(Spain) Athletic Bilbao	1	0	0	1	1	3	−2	0.00
(Spain) Atlético Madrid	2	0	2	0	1	1	+0	0.00
(Lithuania) Banga Gargždai	2	2	0	0	7	0	+7	100.00
(Switzerland) Basel	2	0	1	1	0	3	−3	0.00
(Belarus) BATE Borisov	2	0	1	1	1	2	−1	0.00
(Germany) Bayer Leverkusen	4	0	1	3	5	11	−6	0.00
(Portugal) Benfica	1	1	0	0	3	2	+1	100.00
(Norway) Bodø/Glimt	1	1	0	0	2	1	+1	100.00
(Germany) Borussia Dortmund	2	0	0	2	0	5	−5	0.00
(Portugal) Braga	2	1	0	1	6	5	+1	50.00
(Scotland) Celtic	2	0	1	1	0	1	−1	0.00
(England) Chelsea	3	0	1	2	2	12	−10	0.00
(Belgium) Club Brugge	2	1	0	1	2	4	−2	50.00
(Denmark) Copenhagen	5	2	0	3	4	12	−8	40.00
(Bulgaria) CSKA Sofia	2	0	2	0	0	0	+0	0.00
(Croatia) Dinamo Zagreb	2	0	0	2	0	5	−5	0.00
(Ukraine) Dinamo Kiev	2	1	0	1	2	1	+1	50.00
(Ukraine) Dnipro	2	1	0	1	2	2	+0	50.00
(Slovakia) Dukla Banská Bystrica	2	0	0	2	0	4	−4	0.00
(Republic of Ireland) Dundalk	2	1	1	0	4	1	+3	50.00
(Faroe Islands) EB/Streymur	2	0	2	0	1	1	+0	0.00
(Sweden) IF Elfsborg	1	0	0	1	0	1	−1	0.00
(Germany) Eintracht Frankfurt	3	1	0	2	4	6	−2	33.33
(Luxembourg) F91 Dudelange	4	2	2	0	8	3	+5	50.00
(Hungary) Ferencváros	4	2	1	1	9	6	+3	50.00
(Romania) FCSB	1	0	0	1	2	3	−1	0.00
(Italy) Fiorentina	2	0	0	2	2	7	−5	0.00
(Sweden) Gefle IF	2	2	0	0	3	0	+3	100.00
(Belgium) Gent	2	1	0	1	1	1	+0	50.00
(Sweden) IFK Göteborg	2	1	0	1	3	1	+2	50.00
(Finland) HJK	2	0	0	2	4	2	+2	0.00
(Finland) Honka	2	2	0	0	3	1	+2	100.00
(Sweden) BK Häcken	2	2	0	0	3	1	+2	100.00
(Italy) Inter Milan	2	0	1	1	0	2	−2	0.00
(Czech Republic) Jablonec	2	0	0	2	0	8	−8	0.00
(Kazakhstan) Kairat	2	2	0	0	4	2	+2	100.00
(Albania) Kukësi	2	1	1	0	3	0	+3	50.00
(Poland) Lech Poznań	2	1	0	1	5	2	+3	50.00
(England) Liverpool	1	0	0	1	0	6	−6	0.00
(France) Lyon	1	0	0	1	1	4	−3	0.00
(Poland) Legia Warsaw	1	1	0	0	3	0	+3	100.00
(Gibraltar) Lincoln Red Imps	4	4	0	0	13	1	+12	100.00
(Northern Ireland) Linfield	2	1	0	1	4	4	+0	50.00
(Bulgaria) Ludogorets Razgrad	2	1	0	1	8	4	+4	50.00
(Israel) Maccabi Haifa	2	1	0	1	2	2	+0	50.00
(Israel) Maccabi Tel Aviv	2	0	1	1	1	2	−1	0.00
(Sweden) Malmö FF	1	0	0	1	1	2	−1	0.00
(France) Marseille	2	0	0	2	1	6	−5	0.00
(North Macedonia) Metalurg Skopje	4	3	1	0	7	2	+5	75.00
(Norway) Molde	3	1	2	0	3	2	+1	33.33
(France) Monaco	2	0	1	1	1	2	−1	0.00
(France) Montpellier	2	0	0	2	0	9	−9	0.00
(Finland) MyPa	2	0	1	1	1	2	−1	0.00
(France) Nantes	2	1	0	1	4	2	+2	50.00
(Italy) Napoli	1	0	0	1	0	2	−2	0.00
(England) Newcastle United	2	0	0	2	3	9	−6	0.00
(Slovenia) Olimpija Ljubljana	4	2	2	0	4	1	+3	50.00
(Greece) Olympiacos	3	1	1	1	3	3	+0	33.33
(Cyprus) Omonia	2	1	1	0	6	3	+3	50.00
(Greece) PAOK	2	2	0	0	3	0	+3	100.00
(Albania) Partizani	2	1	1	0	2	0	+2	50.00
(Poland) Piast Gliwice	2	1	1	0	4	3	+1	50.00
(Northern Ireland) Portadown	2	1	1	0	3	2	+1	50.00
(Poland) Raków Częstochowa	2	0	1	1	3	4	−1	0.00
(Austria) Red Bull Salzburg	2	1	0	1	2	3	−1	50.00
(Italy) Roma	2	0	0	2	1	3	−2	0.00
(Norway) Rosenborg	2	1	1	0	1	0	+1	50.00
(Montenegro) Rudar Pljevlja	2	1	1	0	1	0	+1	50.00
(France) Saint-Étienne	2	0	2	0	1	1	+0	0.00
(Georgia (country)) Samtredia	2	2	0	0	6	0	+6	100.00
(Germany) SC Freiburg	2	0	1	1	2	3	−1	0.00
(Spain) Sevilla	2	0	0	2	0	5	−5	0.00
(North Macedonia) Shkëndija	2	2	0	0	6	1	+5	100.00
(Republic of Ireland) Shelbourne	2	2	0	0	4	0	+4	100.00
(Moldova) Sheriff Tiraspol	5	3	1	1	7	3	+4	60.00
(North Macedonia) Sileks	1	1	0	0	4	0	+4	100.00
(Turkey) Sivasspor	2	0	0	2	2	5	−3	0.00
(Czech Republic) Slovan Liberec	2	0	1	1	2	5	−3	0.00
(Portugal) Sporting CP	2	0	0	2	1	8	−7	0.00
(England) Tottenham Hotspur	3	0	0	3	1	7	−6	0.00
(Netherlands) Twente	6	1	3	2	4	8	−4	16.67
(Malta) Valletta	2	2	0	0	5	0	+5	100.00
(Iceland) Vestri	2	2	0	0	6	0	+6	100.00
(Czech Republic) Viktoria Plzeň	4	0	3	1	2	3	−1	0.00
(Spain) Villarreal	2	0	0	2	1	6	−5	0.00
(Ukraine) Vorskla Poltava	2	1	0	1	1	1	+0	50.00
(Poland) Wisła Kraków	2	2	0	0	4	2	+2	100.00
(Switzerland) Young Boys	2	2	0	0	4	0	+4	100.00
(Moldova) Zimbru Chișinău	2	0	1	1	2	3	−1	0.00
(Switzerland) Zürich	2	1	1	0	5	4	+1	50.00

== Player statistics ==
=== Goalscorers ===
As of match played 27.08.2026

	Name	Years	UEFA Cup Winners' Cup	UEFA Cup	UEFA Intertoto Cup	UEFA Europa League	UEFA Champions League	UEFA Conference League	Total	Ratio
1	(France) Abdellah Zoubir	2018–2026	(-)	(-)	(-)	11 (55)	4 (47)	3 (18)	18 (120)	0.15
2	(Brazil) Juninho	2023–2025	(-)	(-)	(-)	8 (20)	6 (7)	(-)	14 (27)	0.519
3	(Cape Verde) Leandro Andrade	2022–Present	(-)	(-)	(-)	5 (26)	7 (27)	1 (3)	13 (56)	0.232
4	(Brazil) Kady Borges	2021–2022; 2025–Present	(-)	(-)	(-)	0 (10)	5 (18)	7 (19)	12 (47)	0.26
4	(Brazil) Reynaldo	2013–2017; 2018–2019	(-)	(-)	(-)	7 (24)	4 (11)	(-)	11 (35)	0.31
6	(Azerbaijan) Toral Bayramov	2019–Present	(-)	(-)	(-)	4 (32)	3 (28)	1 (15)	8 (75)	0.11
6	(Azerbaijan) Richard Almeida	2012–2018; 2019; 2021–2025	(-)	(-)	(-)	6 (45)	2 (39)	0 (7)	8 (91)	0.09
6	(Spain) Dani Quintana	2015–2020	(-)	(-)	(-)	5 (25)	3 (19)	(-)	8 (44)	0.18
9	(Algeria) Yassine Benzia	2023–2025	(-)	(-)	(-)	4 (23)	3 (7)	0 (2)	7 (32)	0.22
9	(Spain) Míchel	2015–2020	(-)	(-)	(-)	3 (23)	4 (27)	(-)	7 (50)	0.14
9	(Azerbaijan) Afran Ismayilov	2006–2013; 2015–2018	(-)	(-)	(-)	6 (28)	1 (13)	(-)	7 (41)	0.17
9	(Azerbaijan) Filip Ozobić	2018–2023	(-)	(-)	(-)	3 (30)	3 (17)	1 (13)	7 (60)	0.12
13	(Montenegro) Marko Janković	2022–Present	(-)	(-)	(-)	2 (31)	4 (29)	0 (5)	6 (65)	0.09
13	(Albania) Redon Xhixha	2023–2025	(-)	(-)	(-)	0 (10)	6 (6)	0 (2)	6 (18)	0.33
13	(Haiti) Wilde-Donald Guerrier	2017–2019; 2020–2021	(-)	(-)	(-)	1 (12)	5 (21)	(-)	6 (33)	0.18
13	(Spain) Jaime Romero	2019–2022	(-)	(-)	(-)	2 (12)	3 (8)	1 (7)	6 (27)	0.22
13	(Ghana) Owusu Kwabena	2020–2023	(-)	(-)	(-)	4 (12)	2 (11)	0 (0)	6 (23)	0.26
18	(Colombia) Camilo Durán	2025–Present	(-)	(-)	(-)	(-)	5 (10)	(-)	5 (10)	0.5
18	(South Africa) Dino Ndlovu	2016–2018	(-)	(-)	(-)	1 (7)	4 (11)	(-)	5 (18)	0.28
18	(Azerbaijan) Mahir Emreli	2015–2021	(-)	(-)	(-)	0 (21)	5 (29)	(-)	5 (50)	0.1
18	(Azerbaijan) Vüqar Nadirov	2001–2005; 2009–2015; 2016–2017	(-)	(-)	0 (1)	5 (33)	0 (3)	(-)	5 (37)	0.14
18	(Azerbaijan) Rashad Sadygov	2009–2010; 2011–2020	(-)	(-)	(-)	5 (63)	0 (29)	(-)	5 (92)	0.05
18	(Senegal) Ibrahima Wadji	2021–2022	(-)	(-)	(-)	(-)	4 (8)	1 (8)	5 (16)	0.31
24	(Cape Verde) Patrick Andrade	2020–2022; 2023–2025	(-)	(-)	(-)	1 (24)	2 (5)	1 (13)	4 (42)	0.1
24	(Azerbaijan) Rashad Sadiqov	2009–2012	(-)	(-)	(-)	4 (19)	(-)	(-)	4 (19)	0.21
24	(North Macedonia) Muarem Muarem	2012–2015; 2016–2017	(-)	(-)	(-)	3 (20)	1 (5)	(-)	4 (25)	0.16
24	(Netherlands) Leroy George	2013–2015	(-)	(-)	(-)	3 (14)	1 (4)	(-)	4 (18)	0.22
28	(Ukraine) Oleksiy Kashchuk	2024–Present	(-)	(-)	(-)	0 (9)	2 (12)	1 (4)	3 (25)	0.12
28	(Azerbaijan) Bəhlul Mustafazadə	2021–Present	(-)	(-)	(-)	1 (24)	2 (30)	0 (6)	3 (60)	0.05
28	(Azerbaijan) Rauf Aliyev	2006–2013	(-)	(-)	(-)	3 (17)	(-)	(-)	3 (17)	0.18
28	(Azerbaijan) Maksim Medvedev	2006–2024	(-)	(-)	(-)	2 (73)	0 (40)	1 (13)	3 (126)	0.02
28	(Brazil) Chumbinho	2013–2015	(-)	(-)	(-)	1 (10)	2 (4)	(-)	3 (14)	0.21
28	(Senegal) Magaye Gueye	2019–2020	(-)	(-)	(-)	2 (7)	1 (2)	(-)	3 (9)	0.33
28	(Azerbaijan) Ramil Sheydayev	2017–2018; 2021–2023	(-)	(-)	(-)	1 (6)	0 (10)	2 (16)	3 (32)	0.09
28	(Colombia) Kevin Medina	2020–Present	(-)	(-)	(-)	1 (24)	2 (31)	0 (14)	3 (69)	0.04
28	(Azerbaijan) Nariman Akhundzade	2022–Present	(-)	(-)	(-)	1 (12)	2 (20)	0 (0)	3 (32)	0.09
37	(Sweden) Zakaria Sawo	2026–Present	(-)	(-)	(-)	2 (4)	(-)	(-)	2 (4)	0.5
37	(France) Jaly Mouaddib	2026–Present	(-)	(-)	(-)	1 (4)	(-)	1 (4)	2 (8)	0.25
37	(Brazil) Matheus Silva	2023–Present	(-)	(-)	(-)	1 (21)	1 (21)	0 (4)	2 (46)	0.04
37	(Azerbaijan) Elvin Cafarguliyev	2020–Present	(-)	(-)	(-)	0 (35)	2 (30)	0 (5)	2 (70)	0.03
37	(Azerbaijan) Mushfig Huseynov	1989–1991; 1992–1999; 2003–2004; 2005–2007	0 (6)	0 (2)	2 (4)	(-)	(-)	(-)	2 (12)	0.17
37	(Azerbaijan) Samir Musayev	2002–2006	0 (-)	2 (4)	(-)	(-)	(-)	(-)	2 (4)	0.5
37	(Azerbaijan) Elvin Mammadov	2009–2011; 2015	(-)	(-)	(-)	2 (13)	0 (4)	(-)	2 (17)	0.12
37	(Brazil) Danilo Dias	2014–2015	(-)	(-)	(-)	0 (3)	2 (4)	(-)	2 (7)	0.29
37	(Azerbaijan) Emin Imamaliev	2003–2005; 2008–2013	(-)	0 (2)	(-)	2 (13)	(-)	(-)	2 (15)	0.13
37	(Azerbaijan) Bakhtiyar Soltanov	2011–2013	(-)	(-)	(-)	2 (4)	(-)	(-)	2 (4)	0.5
37	(Brazil) Ailton	2019–2020	(-)	(-)	(-)	1 (7)	1 (5)	(-)	2 (12)	0.17
37	(Serbia) Uroš Matić	2020–2021	(-)	(-)	(-)	1 (6)	1 (3)	0 (0)	2 (9)	0.22
37	(Azerbaijan) Abbas Hüseynov	2017–Present	(-)	(-)	(-)	0 (18)	1 (13)	1 (12)	2 (43)	0.05
37	(Montenegro) Marko Vešović	2021–2025	(-)	(-)	(-)	2 (17)	0 (13)	0 (14)	2 (46)	0.04
51	(Jamaica) Renaldo Cephas	2026–Present	(-)	(-)	(-)	1 (4)	(-)	0 (2)	1 (6)	0.17
51	(Azerbaijan) Musa Qurbanlı	2019–2020; 2024–Present	(-)	(-)	(-)	0 (6)	1 (11)	0 (12)	1 (29)	0.03
51	(Brazil) Pedro Bicalho	2025–Present	(-)	(-)	(-)	1 (4)	0 (16)	0 (3)	1 (23)	0.04
51	(Azerbaijan) Bakhtiyar Musayev	1996–1998	1 (2)	0 (2)	(-)	(-)	(-)	(-)	1 (4)	0.25
51	(Georgia (country)) Georgi Adamia	2010–2012	(-)	(-)	(-)	1 (14)	(-)	(-)	1 (14)	0.07
51	(Albania) Admir Teli	2009–2015	(-)	(-)	(-)	1 (30)	0 (3)	(-)	1 (33)	0.03
51	(Albania) Ansi Agolli	2010–2011; 2012–2019	(-)	(-)	(-)	1 (45)	0 (24)	(-)	1 (69)	0.01
51	(Republic of the Congo) Ulrich Kapolongo	2013–2014	(-)	(-)	(-)	1 (7)	(-)	(-)	1 (7)	0.14
51	(Sweden) Samuel Armenteros	2015–2016	(-)	(-)	(-)	1 (6)	(-)	(-)	1 (6)	0.17
51	(Azerbaijan) Rahid Amirguliyev	2015–2018	(-)	(-)	(-)	1 (5)	0 (2)	(-)	1 (7)	0.14
51	(Brazil) Pedro Henrique	2017–2018	(-)	(-)	(-)	(-)	1 (4)	(-)	1 (4)	0.25
51	(Republic of the Congo) Dzon Delarge	2018–2019	(-)	(-)	(-)	0 (6)	1 (3)	(-)	1 (9)	0.11
51	(Azerbaijan) Araz Abdullayev	2018–2020	(-)	(-)	(-)	1 (11)	0 (5)	(-)	1 (16)	0.06
51	(Morocco) Faycal Rherras	2019–2020	(-)	(-)	(-)	1 (1)	0 (0)	(-)	1 (1)	1
-	Own goal	1996–Present	0 (4)	0 (6)	0 (4)	1 (103)	0 (66)	1 (16)	2 (199)	0.01

=== Clean sheets ===
As of match played 27.08.2026

	Name	Years	UEFA Cup Winners' Cup	UEFA Cup	UEFA Intertoto Cup	UEFA Europa League	UEFA Champions League	UEFA Europa Conference League	Total	Ratio
1	(Bosnia and Herzegovina) Ibrahim Šehić	2013–2018	(-)	(-)	(-)	10 (24)	11 (23)	(-)	21 (47)	0.45
2	(Azerbaijan) Shakhruddin Magomedaliyev	2016–2023, 2024–Present	(-)	(-)	(-)	4 (15)	4 (15)	5 (12)	13 (42)	0.31
3	(Brazil) Vagner	2018–2020	(-)	(-)	(-)	1 (8)	7 (10)	(-)	8 (18)	0.44
4	(Poland) Mateusz Kochalski	2024–Present	(-)	(-)	(-)	4 (10)	3 (16)	0 (1)	7 (27)	0.26
4	(Azerbaijan) Farhad Valiyev	2007–2016	(-)	(-)	(-)	6 (15)	(-)	(-)	6 (15)	0.4
6	(Croatia) Miro Varvodić	2012–2013	(-)	(-)	(-)	4 (8)	(-)	(-)⁷	4 (8)	0.5
7	(Serbia) Bojan Pavlović	2011–2012	(-)	(-)	(-)	3 (5)	(-)	(-)	3 (5)	0.6
8	(Bosnia and Herzegovina) Martin Zlomislic	2026–Present	(-)	(-)	(-)	(-)	(-)	2 (3)	2 (3)	0.67
8	(Georgia (country)) Luka Gugeshashvili	2022, 2022–2024	(-)	(-)	(-)	1 (3)	0 (0)	1 (4)	2 (7)	0.29
8	(Russia) Andrey Lunyov	2023–2024	(-)	(-)	(-)	2 (10)	0 (0)	(-)	2 (10)	0.2
8	(Croatia) Fabijan Buntić	2024–2026	(-)	(-)	(-)	1 (3)	1 (5)	(-)	2 (8)	0.25
12	(Ukraine) Anton Kanibolotskyi	2017–2018	(-)	(-)	(-)	(-)	1 (1)	(-)	1 (1)	1
12	(Iceland) Hannes Þór Halldórsson	2018–2019	(-)	(-)	(-)	1 (2)	0 (2)	(-)	1 (4)	0.25
14	(Azerbaijan) Djamalladin Aliyev	1990–1999	0 (4)	0 (2)	(-)	(-)	(-)	(-)	0 (6)	0
14	(Azerbaijan) Vurgun Guliyev	1998–1999	(-)	(-)	0 (3)	(-)	(-)	(-)	0 (3)	0
14	(Azerbaijan) Namig Bashirov	1999	(-)	(-)	0 (1)	(-)	(-)	(-)	0 (1)	0
14	(Azerbaijan) Rauf Mehdiyev	2004–2005	(-)	0 (2)	(-)	(-)	(-)	(-)	0 (2)	0
14	(Azerbaijan) Jahangir Hasanzade	2005–2007	(-)	0 (2)	(-)	(-)	(-)	(-)	0 (2)	0
14	(Bosnia and Herzegovina) Asmir Begović	2019–2020	(-)	(-)	(-)	0 (5)	0 (0)	(-)	0 (5)	0

== Club ranking ==
=== UEFA coefficient ===
Correct as of 30.07.2026. The table shows the position of Qarabağ (highlighted), based on their UEFA coefficient club ranking, and the four clubs which are closest to Qarabağ's position (the two clubs with the higher coefficient and the two with the lower coefficient).

Rank	Club	2022–23	2023–24	2024–25	2025–26	2026–27	Coeff.
57	(Netherlands) Ajax	8.000	5.000	13.250	10.000	2.000	38.250
58	(Greece) PAOK FC	1,500	15,000	7.750	11.000	2.500	37.750
59	(Czech Republic) Sparta Praha	1,500	10,000	9,000	12.750	3.000	36.250
60	(Azerbaijan) Qarabağ	6.000	11.000	3.000	13.750	2.000	35.750
61	(Serbia) Crvena Zvezda	4,000	5,000	10.000	12.500	2.500	34.000
62	(Germany) VfB Stuttgart	0.000	0.000	13.000	14.500	6.000	33.500
63	(Slovakia) ŠK Slovan Bratislava	12.000	8.000	6.000	4.000	2.500	32.500
