= 2025–26 Qarabağ FK season =

Qarabağ
2025–26 season
- President: Tahir Gözel
- Manager: Gurban Gurbanov
- Stadium: Azersun Arena
- Premier League: 2nd
- Azerbaijan Cup: Semi-Final
- UEFA Champions League: Knockout phase play-offs
- Top goalscorer: League: Camilo Durán (9); Leandro Andrade (9); All: Leandro Andrade (16)
Home colours	Away colours	Third colours

The 2025–26 season was Qarabağ FK's 75th year since its founding and its 34th consecutive season in Azerbaijan's premier league. The team will also compete in the Azerbaijan Cup, and the UEFA Champions League.

== Season overview ==
On 17 June, Qarabağ announced the signing of Dani Bolt from Torreense to a three-year contract with the option of an additional year.

On 20 June, Qarabağ announced the signing of Pedro Bicalho from Palmeiras to a three-year contract with the option of an additional year.

On 12 July, Qarabağ announced the signing of Chris Kouakou from Mafra to a two-year contract with the option of an additional two years.

On 17 July, Qarabağ announced the loan signing of Samy Mmaee from Dinamo Zagreb

On 3 August, Qarabağ announced the signing of Joni Montiel from Rayo Vallecano, to a two-year contract with the option of an additional two years.

On 26 August, Qarabağ announced the signing of Camilo Durán from Portimonense, to a three-year contract.

On 18 September, Qarabağ announced the signing of free-agent Ramil Sheydayev, to a one-year contract.

On 2 February, Qarabağ announced the signing of Jeremie Gnali from AEK Larnaca on a contract until the summer of 2028.

On 10 February, Qarabağ announced that Nariman Akhundzade had left the club to join Columbus Crew in Major League Soccer.

On 18 May, Qarabağ announced the signing of Jaly Mouaddib for the 2026–27 season, on a contract until the summer of 2029.

On 24 May, Qarabağ announced their second signing ahead of the 2026–27 season, Zakaria Sawo from Djurgården on a contract until the summer of 2029.

On 25 May, Qarabağ announced that Toral Bayramov would be leaving the club to join Bursaspor.

== Kits ==
Supplier: Adidas / Sponsor: Azersun

Home	Away	Third

Goalkeeper 1	Goalkeeper 2	Goalkeeper 3

== Squad ==
As of match played 22 May 2026

No.	Name	Nationality	Position	Date of birth (age)	Signed from	Signed in	Contract ends	Apps.	Goals
Goalkeepers
1	Shakhruddin Magomedaliyev	(Azerbaijan)	GK	12 June 1994 (age 32)	Sumgayit	2024		155	0
12	Sadig Mammadzade	(Azerbaijan)	GK	29 October 2006 (age 19)	Sabail	2024		1	0
89	Amin Ramazanov	(Azerbaijan)	GK	20 January 2003 (age 23)	Lokomotiv Moscow	2021		15	0
97	Fabijan Buntić	(Croatia)	GK	24 February 1997 (age 29)	Vizela	2024	2027	22	0
99	Mateusz Kochalski	(Poland)	GK	25 July 2000 (age 26)	Stal Mielec	2024	2028	69	0
Defenders
2	Matheus Silva	(Brazil)	DF	3 October 1997 (age 28)	Lokomotiv Plovdiv	2023	2025 (+2)	131	5
3	Samy Mmaee	(Morocco)	DF	8 September 1996 (age 30)	on loan from Dinamo Zagreb	2025	2026	15	1
13	Behlul Mustafazade	(Azerbaijan)	DF	27 February 1997 (age 29)	Unattached	2021		163	6
18	Dani Bolt	(Brazil)	DF	18 June 1999 (age 27)	Torreense	2025	2028 (+1)	40	1
24	Jeremie Gnali	(France)	DF	12 April 2002 (age 24)	AEK Larnaca	2026	2028	4	0
26	Amin Rzayev	(Azerbaijan)	DF	12 October 2009 (age 16)	Academy	2025		1	0
27	Toral Bayramov	(Azerbaijan)	DF	23 February 2001 (age 25)	Academy	2019		253	36
30	Abbas Huseynov	(Azerbaijan)	DF	13 June 1995 (age 31)	Inter Baku	2017		182	5
32	Hikmat Jabrayilzade	(Azerbaijan)	DF	2 August 2007 (age 19)	Academy	2024		8	0
44	Elvin Cafarguliyev	(Azerbaijan)	DF	26 October 2000 (age 25)	Youth team	2019		228	10
55	Badavi Guseynov	(Azerbaijan)	DF	11 July 1991 (age 35)	Anzhi Makhachkala	2012		400	6
74	Sabuhi Niftiyev	(Azerbaijan)	DF	6 January 2007 (age 19)	Academy	2025		1	0
81	Kevin Medina	(Colombia)	DF	9 March 1993 (age 33)	Chaves	2020		202	6
Midfielders
8	Marko Janković	(Montenegro)	MF	9 July 1995 (age 31)	Hapoel Tel Aviv	2022		170	13
9	Joni Montiel	(Spain)	MF	3 September 1998 (age 28)	Rayo Vallecano	2025	2027 (+2)	25	5
10	Abdellah Zoubir	(France)	MF	5 December 1991 (age 34)	RC Lens	2018		363	78
15	Leandro Andrade	(Cape Verde)	MF	24 September 1999 (age 27)	Cherno More	2021	2027	213	60
20	Kady Borges	(Brazil)	MF	2 May 1996 (age 30)	Ferencváros	2025	2028	131	40
21	Oleksiy Kashchuk	(Ukraine)	MF	29 June 2000 (age 26)	Shakhtar Donetsk	2024	2027	72	12
35	Pedro Bicalho	(Brazil)	MF	23 April 2001 (age 25)	Palmeiras	2025	2028 (+1)	51	1
47	Mehdi Mutallimli	(Azerbaijan)	MF	12 December 2007 (age 18)	Academy	2025		1	0
66	Hacy Ibrahim	(Azerbaijan)	MF	25 September 2005 (age 21)	Academy	2025		1	0
76	Nicat Khasiyev	(Azerbaijan)	MF	23 February 2006 (age 20)	Academy	2025		1	0
82	Mahammad Imamaliyev	(Azerbaijan)	MF	23 September 2007 (age 19)	Academy	2025		1	0
Forwards
11	Emmanuel Addai	(Ghana)	FW	1 August 2001 (age 25)	AD Alcorcón	2024	2026	88	12
17	Camilo Durán	(Colombia)	FW	10 February 2002 (age 24)	Portimonense	2025	2028	45	15
22	Musa Qurbanlı	(Azerbaijan)	FW	13 April 2002 (age 24)	Djurgarden	2024	2027	128	46
77	Ramil Sheydayev	(Azerbaijan)	FW	15 March 1996 (age 30)	Unattached	2025	2026	123	39
80	Behruz Qurbanli	(Azerbaijan)	FW	6 March 2005 (age 21)	Academy	2025		1	0
Away on loan
Left during the season
6	Chris Kouakou	(Ivory Coast)	MF	15 December 1999 (age 26)	Mafra	2025	2027 (+2)	19	1
7	Nariman Akhundzade	(Azerbaijan)	FW	23 April 2004 (age 22)	Youth team	2022		127	35
24	Aleksey Isayev	(Azerbaijan)	MF	9 November 1995 (age 30)	Sabah	2024	2027	56	1

== Transfers ==
=== In ===
Date	Position	Nationality	Name	From	Fee	Ref.
17 June 2025	DF	(Brazil)	Dani Bolt	Torreense	Undisclosed	
20 June 2025	MF	(Brazil)	Pedro Bicalho	Palmeiras	Undisclosed	
12 July 2025	MF	(Ivory Coast)	Chris Kouakou	Mafra	Undisclosed	
3 August 2025	MF	(Spain)	Joni Montiel	Rayo Vallecano	Undisclosed	
26 August 2025	FW	(Colombia)	Camilo Durán	Portimonense	Undisclosed	
18 September 2025	FW	(Azerbaijan)	Ramil Sheydayev	Unattached	Free	
2 February 2026	DF	(France)	Jeremie Gnali	AEK Larnaca	Undisclosed	

=== Loans in ===
Date from	Position	Nationality	Name	From	Date to	Ref.
17 July 2025	DF	(Morocco)	Samy Mmaee	Dinamo Zagreb	End of season	

=== Out ===
Date	Position	Nationality	Name	To	Fee	Ref.
10 July 2025	FW	(Albania)	Redon Xhixha	CR Belouizdad	Undisclosed	
10 September 2025	MF	(Azerbaijan)	Aleksey Isayev	Sabah	Undisclosed	
10 February 2026	FW	(Azerbaijan)	Nariman Akhundzade	Columbus Crew	Undisclosed	
13 March 2026	MF	(Ivory Coast)	Chris Kouakou	Sarpsborg 08	Undisclosed	
25 May 2026	DF	(Azerbaijan)	Toral Bayramov	Bursaspor	Undisclosed	

=== Released ===
Date	Position	Nationality	Name	Joined	Date	Ref
11 June 2025	DF	(Montenegro)	Marko Vešović	Lokomotiva Zagreb		
11 June 2025	MF	(Algeria)	Yassine Benzia	Al-Fayha	6 August 2025	
11 June 2025	MF	(Cape Verde)	Patrick Andrade	Araz-Naxçıvan	22 June 2025	
11 June 2025	MF	(Azerbaijan)	İsmayıl İbrahimli	Zira	12 June 2025	
18 July 2025	FW	(Azerbaijan)	Rustam Akhmedzade	Sumgayit	28 July 2025	
23 May 2026	MF	(Ghana)	Emmanuel Addai	OH Leuven		
23 May 2026	FW	(Azerbaijan)	Ramil Sheydayev	Sochi	3 August 2026	

== Friendlies ==
12 January 2026	Qarabağ	5–0	Neftchi Fergana	Belek, Turkey
AZT (UTC+4)	Janković; Andrade; Montiel	Report		Stadium: Gloria Sports Arena

16 January 2026	NK Osijek	1–3	Qarabağ	Belek, Turkey
12:00 AZT (UTC+4)	Goal	Report	Qurbanlı; Kashchuk; Hüseynov	Stadium: Gloria Sports Arena

16 January 2026	Qarabağ	3–1	Zagłębie Lubin	Belek, Turkey
19:00 AZT (UTC+4)	Andrade; Zoubir; Montiel	Report	Goal	Stadium: Gloria Sports Arena

== Competitions ==
=== Overview ===
Competition	First match	Last match	Starting round	Final position	Record							
Competition	First match	Last match	Starting round	Final position	Pld	W	D	L	GF	GA	GD	Win %
Premier League	22 August 2025	22 May 2026	Matchday 2	2nd	33	21	6	6	71	27	+44	63.64
Azerbaijan Cup	3 December 2025	22 April 2026	Last 16	Semi-final	5	2	1	2	10	7	+3	40.00
UEFA Champions League	23 July 2025	25 February 2026	Second qualifying round	Knockout phase play-offs	16	8	1	7	31	35	−4	50.00
Total					54	31	8	15	112	69	+43	57.41

Last updated: 22 May 2026
Source: Competitions

=== Premier League ===
==== Results summary ====
Overall								Home						Away					
Pld	W	D	L	GF	GA	GD	Pts	W	D	L	GF	GA	GD	W	D	L	GF	GA	GD
33	21	6	6	71	27	+44	69	11	3	3	37	10	+27	10	3	3	34	17	+17

Last updated: 22 May 2026.
Source: See Results

==== Results by round ====
Round	2	3	4	5	6	7	8	9	10	11	12	13	14	15	1	16	17	18	19	20	22	23	24	25	26	27	28	29	21	30	31	32	33
Ground	H	A	H	A	H	H	A	H	H	H	A	H	A	H	A	A	H	H	A	A	H	H	A	A	H	A	H	A	A	H	A	H	A
Result	L	W	D	W	W	W	W	D	W	W	W	W	D	W	L	W	L	W	W	W	D	W	W	L	W	D	L	W	L	W	D	W	W
Position	11	7	7	5	5	3	1	2	2	1	1	1	1	1	2	2	2	2	2	2	2	2	2	2	2	2	2	2	2	2	2	2	2

Updated to match(es) played on 22 May 2026. Source: See Results
A = Away; H = Home; W = Win; D = Draw; L = Loss; P = Bye

==== Results ====
22 August 2025 2	Qarabağ	0–1	Sumgayit	Baku
19:30 (UTC+4)		Report	Janković (yellow card) 60'; Vásquez 72'; Rustamli (yellow card) 85'; Quliyev (yellow card) 90+5'	Stadium: Azersun Arena; Attendance: 1,000; Referee: Cavid Cəlilov

31 August 2025 3	Karvan	0–2	Qarabağ	Shamakhi
17:00 (UTC+4)		Report	Yunuszade 11' (o.g.); Addai 73'	Stadium: City Stadium; Attendance: 800; Referee: Rəvan Həmzəzadə

12 September 2025 4	Qarabağ	1–1	Zira	Baku
20:00 (UTC+4)	Janković (yellow card) 75'; Borges 81'	Report	Renato 39' (pen.); Bogomolsky (yellow card) 57'; Djibrilla (yellow card) 77'; Alıyev (yellow card) 80'	Stadium: Azersun Arena; Attendance: 1,400; Referee: Reshad Ahmedov

21 September 2025 5	Araz-Naxçıvan	0–5	Qarabağ	Baku
17:00 (UTC+4)	Alxasov (yellow card) 11' (yellow-red card) 28'; Abbasov (yellow card) 50'; Santos (yellow card) 60'; Andrade (yellow card) 87'	Report	Bayramov 4', 28' (pen.), 65' (pen.); Qurbanlı 52'; Kouakou 86'	Stadium: Dalga Arena; Attendance: 450; Referee: Aliyar Aghayev

26 September 2025 6	Qarabağ	2–0	Gabala	Baku
19:00 AZT (UTC+4)	Zoubir 16'; Silva (yellow card) 43'; Qurbanlı 90+3'	Report	Owusu (red card) 1'; Massoumou (yellow card) 42'	Stadium: Azersun Arena; Attendance: 860; Referee: Rauf Cabarov

4 October 2025 7	Qarabağ	1–0	Kapaz	Baku
17:00 AZT (UTC+4)	Mmaee 38'; Daniel (yellow card) 51'; Kady (yellow card) 90+3'	Report	Feijão (yellow card) 9'; Samadov (yellow card) 70'; Verdasca (yellow card) 90+3'	Stadium: Azersun Arena; Attendance: 1,200; Referee: Nicat İsmayıllı

17 October 2025 8	Turan Tovuz	1–2	Qarabağ	Tovuz
19:00 (UTC+4)	Serrano (yellow card) 20' (goal) 40' (pen.); Ozobić (yellow card) 24'; Miller (yellow card) 33'	Report	Mmaee (yellow card) 24'; Akhundzade 55'; Zoubir 63'; Magomedaliyev (yellow card) 81'	Stadium: City Stadium; Attendance: 1,000; Referee: Elçin Məsiyev

26 October 2025 9	Qarabağ	0–0	Şamaxı	Baku
16:30 (UTC+4)	Kouakou (yellow card) 44'	Report	Rossi (yellow card) 71'	Stadium: Azersun Arena; Attendance: 850; Referee: Tural Qurbanov

31 October 2025 10	Qarabağ	2–0	İmişli	Baku
17:00 (UTC+4)	Kochalski (yellow card) 11'; Zoubir 52'; Addai 82'; Kady (yellow card) 89'	Report	Juninho (penalty missed) 11'; Aghazade (yellow card) 86'	Stadium: Azersun Arena; Attendance: 700; Referee: Əli Əliyev

9 November 2025 11	Qarabağ	2–0	Neftçi	Baku
18:44 (UTC+4)	Bayramov 50' (pen.); Daniel (yellow card) 75'; Durán 84'	Report	Sacko (yellow card) 59'	Stadium: Azersun Arena; Attendance: 4,677; Referee: Elçin Məsiyev

21 November 2025 12	Sumgayit	2–4	Qarabağ	Sumgait
19:00 (UTC+4)	Senhadji (yellow card) 14' (yellow-red card) 60'; Haghverdi 31'; Pinto (yellow card) 69'; Ramalingom (penalty missed) 77'; Simon 84'	Report	Silva (yellow card) 2'; Andrade 6'; Addai (yellow card) 11'; Medina (yellow card) 36'; Bayramov 42'; Zoubir 63'; Kashchuk 90+3'	Stadium: City Stadium; Attendance: 9,100; Referee: Fərid Hacıyev

29 November 2025 13	Qarabağ	2–0	Karvan	Baku
17:00 (UTC+4)	Addai 79'; Akhundzade 89'	Report	Turabov (yellow card) 42'	Stadium: Azersun Arena; Attendance: 900; Referee: Kamranbey Rahimov

6 December 2025 14	Zira	1–1	Qarabağ	Zirə
17:00 (UTC+4)	Djibrilla 31'	Report	Henrique 44' (o.g.); Zoubir (yellow card) 86'; Janković (yellow card) 90+2'; Montiel (yellow card) 90+2'	Stadium: Zira Olympic Sport Complex Stadium; Attendance: 1,200; Referee: Rauf Cabarov

14 December 2025 15	Qarabağ	5–1	Araz-Naxçıvan	Baku
17:30 (UTC+4)	Bayramov 31', 90+4' (pen.); Akhundzade 41'; Montiel 57' (pen.); Andrade (yellow card) 66' (goal) 72'	Report	Rodrigues (yellow card) 37'; Wanderson (yellow card) 66'; Ramon 76' (pen.); Abbasov (yellow card) 86'; Simakala (yellow card) 90+2'	Stadium: Azersun Arena; Attendance: 700; Referee: Rəşad Əhmədov

18 December 2025 1	Sabah	2–1	Qarabağ	Masazir
19:30 (UTC+4)	Zedadka (yellow card) 19'; Mickels 53'; Malouda 88'	Report	Andrade 9'; Addai (yellow card) 75'	Stadium: Bank Respublika Arena; Attendance: 4,226; Referee: Elçin Məsiyev
Note: Match originally scheduled for 17 August 2025.

21 December 2025 16	Gabala	1–2	Qarabağ	Qabala
15:00 (UTC+4)	Owusu 6'; Ba Loua (yellow card) 8'; Sierra (yellow card) 63'; Aliyev (yellow card) 65'	Report	Guseynov 27'; Janković 79' (yellow card) 90+4'; Daniel (yellow card) 86'	Stadium: City Stadium; Attendance: 850; Referee: Əli Əliyev

24 January 2026 17	Qarabağ	0–2	Kapaz	Baku
16:30 (UTC+4)		Report	Ohori 24'; Şahverdiyev 55'; İmanov (yellow card) 85'	Stadium: Azersun Arena; Attendance: 850; Referee: Vüqar Həsənli

1 February 2025 18	Qarabağ	1–0	Turan Tovuz	Baku
18:30 (UTC+4)	Montiel (yellow card) 35'; Zoubir 41'; Janković (yellow card) 47'	Report	Hacıyev (yellow card) 11'; Ozobić (yellow card) 35'; Wadji (yellow card) 44'; Miller (yellow card) 55'	Stadium: Azersun Arena; Attendance: 2,617; Referee: Elçin Məsiyev

10 February 2026 19	Şamaxı	1–2	Qarabağ	Shamakhi
14:30 (UTC+4)	Mammadov 14'; Msanga (yellow card) 59'; Süleymanov (yellow card) 90+2'; Agjabayov (yellow card) 90+5'	Report	Montiel 18' (yellow card) 56'; Mustafazade (yellow card) 40'; Silva (yellow card) 63'; Durán 90+4' (yellow card) 90+5'	Stadium: City Stadium; Attendance: 900; Referee: Kamal Umudlu

14 February 2026 20	İmişli	0–1	Qarabağ	Baku
14:30 (UTC+4)	Almeida (yellow card) 47' (yellow-red card) 84'; Isayev (yellow card) 90'	Report	Kady (red card) 72'; Qurbanlı 79'; Janković (yellow card) 90+2'	Stadium: Lökbatan Olympic Sport Complex Stadium; Attendance: 3,500; Referee: Cavid Cəlilov

1 March 2026 22	Qarabağ	3–3	Sabah	Baku
19:00 (UTC+4)	Medina (yellow card) 2' (goal) 79'; Bicalho 73'; Silva (yellow card) 82'; Qurbanlı 84' (yellow card) FT	Report	Aliyev 13'; Nogueira (yellow card) 23'; Solvet (yellow card) 31'; Malouda 54'; Mickels 61'	Stadium: Azersun Arena; Attendance: 10,361; Referee: Tural Qurbanov

8 March 2026 23	Qarabağ	6–0	Araz-Naxçıvan	Baku
19:15 (UTC+4)	Montiel 15' (pen.); Andrade 33', 36'; Durán 64' (pen.), 89'; Qurbanlı 83'	Report	Ahmadzada (yellow card) 42'; Paro (yellow card) 62'	Stadium: Azersun Arena; Attendance: 3,200; Referee: Rəşad Əhmədov

14 March 2026 24	Zira	1–3	Qarabağ	Zirə
19:15 (UTC+4)	Henrique (yellow card) 66'; C.Nuriyev 70'	Report	Montiel 22'; Durán 55'; Kady 72'	Stadium: Zira Olympic Sport Complex Stadium; Attendance: 1,200; Referee: Fərid Hacıyev

20 March 2026 25	Kapaz	1–0	Qarabağ	Yevlakh
15:00 (UTC+4)	Şahverdiyev (yellow card) 38'; Nabiyev 45+1'; İmanov (yellow card) 80'; Jafarov (yellow card) 90+7'	Report	Janković (yellow card) 38'; Bicalho (yellow card) 48'	Stadium: City Stadium; Attendance: 5,000; Referee: Əli Əliyev

6 April 2026 26	Qarabağ	7–0	Karvan	Baku
19:00 (UTC+4)	Andrade 23', 64'; Durán 31', 45', 48'; Bolt 40' (yellow card) 62'; Zoubir 43'	Report		Stadium: Republican Stadium; Attendance: 800; Referee: Kamranbəy Rəhimov

11 April 2026 27	Şamaxı	0–0	Qarabağ	Shamakhi
15:30 (UTC+4)	Ismayilov (yellow card) 82'; Fernandes (yellow card) 89'	Report	Magomedaliyev (yellow card) HT; Kady (yellow card) 62'; Durán (yellow card) 63'; Janković (yellow card) 89'	Stadium: City Stadium; Attendance: 2,100; Referee: İnqilab Məmmədov

18 April 2026 28	Qarabağ	0–1	Sabah	Baku
19:30 (UTC+4)	Silva (yellow card) 11'; Durán (yellow card) 90+5'	Report	Mickels (penalty missed) 13'; Solvet (yellow card) 20'; Simić (yellow card) 29'; Khaybulayev 45' (red card) 47'; Zedadka (yellow card) 52'; Pokatilov (yellow card) 82'	Stadium: Republican Stadium; Attendance: 17,338; Referee: Elçin Məsiyev

27 April 2026 29	Neftçi	1–5	Qarabağ	Baku
19:00 (UTC+4)	Badalov 20'; Ortíz (yellow card) 60'; Rezabala (yellow card) 83'	Report	Qurbanlı 9', 32'; Silva (yellow card) 14'; Montiel 38'; Andrade 68'; Addai 90+3'	Stadium: Neftçi Arena; Attendance: 9,500; Referee: Tural Qurbanov

30 April 2026 21	Neftçi	2–1	Qarabağ	Baku
20:00 (UTC+4)	D'Almeida (yellow card) 24'; Safarov (yellow card) 39' (goal) 55'; Vargas (yellow card) 74'; Balayev (yellow card) 90'; Sambou 90+2' (yellow card) 90+2'	Report	Montiel (yellow card) 41'; Badalov 86' (o.g.); Kady (yellow card) 90+1'; Durán (yellow card) 90+4'	Stadium: Neftçi Arena; Attendance: 7,800; Referee: Kamranbəy Rəhimov
Note: Match originally scheduled for 21 February 2026.

4 May 2026 30	Qarabağ	2–1	Turan Tovuz	Baku
19:30 (UTC+4)	Andrade 50'; Bicalho (yellow card) 52'; Silva 54'; Medina (yellow card) 69'	Report	Sadykhov (yellow card) 18'; Jô (yellow card) 37'; Olabe (yellow card) 52'; Guseynov 76'	Stadium: Republican Stadium; Attendance: 2,414; Referee: Rəşad Əhmədov

9 May 2026 31	Gabala	1–1	Qarabağ	Qabala
17:00 (UTC+4)	Akinade 57' (yellow card) 86'; Ahmadov (yellow card) 78'; Rashidov (yellow card) 82'; Mammadov (red card) 86'	Report	Kady 29'; Durán (yellow card) 50'; Bayramov (penalty missed) 78'	Stadium: City Stadium; Attendance: 2,000; Referee: İnqilab Məmmədov

16 May 2026 32	Qarabağ	3–0	İmişli	Baku
17:00 (UTC+4)	Silva (yellow card) 34'; Durán 46'; Janković 66' (pen.); Zoubir 78'; Kashchuk (yellow card) 84'	Report	Juninho (yellow card) 42'; Guliyev (yellow card) 65'	Stadium: Republican Stadium; Attendance: 1,300; Referee: Emin Əliyev

22 May 2026 33	Sumgayit	3–4	Qarabağ	Sumgait
19:30 (UTC+4)	Abdullazade 53' (yellow card) 57'; Beskorovaynyi (yellow card) 72'; Akhmedzade 76'; Mustafayev 90+3'	Report	Sheydayev 3', 64' (yellow card) 72'; Addai 21' (yellow card) 72'; Janković (yellow card) 57'; Kashchuk 85'	Stadium: City Stadium; Attendance: 6,800; Referee: Elvin Bayramov

==== League table ====
Pos	Team	Pld	W	D	L	GF	GA	GD	Pts	Qualification or relegation
1	Sabah (C)	33	24	6	3	75	25	+50	78	Qualification for the Champions League first qualifying round
2	Qarabağ	33	21	6	6	71	27	+44	69	Qualification for the Europa League first qualifying round (Note: The 2025–26 Azerbaijan Cup winner (Sabah) qualified for the Europa League first qualifying round. Since Sabah also won the league, the berth was passed to the second place team and the Conference League berths go to the third and fourth placed teams.)
3	Turan Tovuz (Note: UEFA removed Turan Tovuz for a past match-fixing case.)	33	17	8	8	44	27	+17	59 (Note: Matches won: Turan-Tovuz 17, Neftçi 16.)	
4	Neftçi	33	16	11	6	57	32	+25	59	Qualification for the Conference League second qualifying round
5	Zira	33	13	14	6	43	36	+7	53	Qualification for the Conference League first qualifying round

Source: Soccerway
Rules for classification: 1) Points; 2) Matches won; 3) Goal difference; 4) Goals scored; 5) Head-to-head points; 6) Head-to-head goal difference; 7) Lower number of points based on yellow and red cards; 8) Draw.
(C) Champions

=== Azerbaijan Cup ===
3 December 2025 Last 16	Qarabağ	3–0	Karvan	Baku
19:00 (UTC+4)	Janković (yellow card) 41'; Akhundzade 80', 88'; Yunuszade 83' (o.g.)	Report	Qadirzada (yellow card) 35'; Abdullayev (yellow card) 41'; Kings (yellow card) 57'; Yunuszade (yellow card) 88'	Stadium: Azersun Arena; Attendance: 550; Referee: Əliyar Ağayev

5 February 2026 Quarter-final 1st leg	Şamaxı	2–1	Qarabağ	Shamakhi
14:30 AZT (UTC+4)	Rossi (yellow card) 13' (goal) 26', 42'; Mammadov (yellow card) 77'	Report	Qurbanlı (yellow card) 45' (goal) 79'	Stadium: City Stadium; Attendance: 1,200; Referee: Kamranbəy Rəhimov

4 March 2026 Quarter-final 2nd leg	Qarabağ	3–1 (4–3 agg.)	Şamaxı	Baku
16:00 AZT (UTC+4)	Addai 6', 61'; Andrade 63'	Report	Rossi (penalty missed) 32' 90+5'; Veremeev (yellow card) 47'; Fernandes (yellow card) 85'; Tîrcoveanu (yellow card) 90+3'	Stadium: Tofiq Bahramov Republican Stadium; Attendance: 750; Referee: Fərid Hacıyev

3 April 2026 Semi-final 1st leg	Qarabağ	2–2	Sabah	Baku
20:00 AZT (UTC+4)	Kady 29', 60'; Montiel (yellow card) 47'; Cafarguliyev (yellow card) 80'	Report	Dashdamirov (yellow card) 14'; Rakhmonaliev 23', 65' (pen.); Isayev (yellow card) 86'	Stadium: Tofiq Bahramov Republican Stadium; Attendance: 21,000; Referee: Rauf Cabarov

22 April 2026 Semi-final 2nd leg	Sabah	2–1 (4–3 agg.)	Qarabağ	Masazir
20:00 AZT (UTC+4)	Nogueira (yellow card) 11'; Solvet (yellow card) 11'; Pokatilov (yellow card) 17'; Malouda (yellow card) 44'; Simić 79'; Mbina 88'	Report	Kochalski (red card) 37'; Durán 59' (yellow card) 90+5'; Janković (yellow card) FT (yellow-red card) FT; Qurbanlı (yellow card) FT	Stadium: Bank Respublika Arena; Attendance: 8,730; Referee: Rəvan Həmzəzadə

=== UEFA Champions League ===
==== Qualifying rounds ====
23 July 2025 Second qualifying round 1st leg	Shelbourne (Republic of Ireland)	0–3	(Azerbaijan) Qarabağ	Dublin, Republic of Ireland
22:45 (UTC+4)	Gannon (yellow card) 44'; Wood (yellow card) 71'; O'Sullivan (yellow card) 90+3'	Report	Andrade 12'; Akhundzade (yellow card) 42' (goal) 85'; Daniel (yellow card) 70'; Kashchuk 81'	Stadium: Tolka Park; Attendance: 3,650; Referee: Ante Čulina (Croatia)

30 July 2025 Second qualifying round 2nd leg	Qarabağ (Azerbaijan)	1–0 (4–0 agg.)	(Republic of Ireland) Shelbourne	Baku, Azerbaijan
20:00 (UTC+4)	Martin 44' (o.g.); Kady (penalty missed) 68'; Medina (yellow card) 69'	Report	Boyd (yellow card) 81'; Ledwidge (yellow card) 88'; Coote (yellow card) 90'	Stadium: Tofiq Bahramov Republican Stadium; Attendance: 25,573; Referee: Andrea Colombo (Italy)

5 August 2025 Third qualifying round 1st leg	Shkëndija (North Macedonia)	0–1	(Azerbaijan) Qarabağ	Skopje, Macedonia
22:00 (UTC+4)	Cake (yellow card) 37'; Zejnullai (yellow card) 70'; Qaka (yellow card) 85'; Fetai (yellow card) 90+3'	Report	Bayramov 18' (pen.); Kady (yellow card) 66'; Kochalski (yellow card) 69'; Kashchuk (yellow card) 90+4'	Stadium: Toše Proeski Arena; Attendance: 15,930; Referee: Ivan Kružliak (Slovakia)
Note: Shkëndija play their home matches at the Toše Proeski Arena in Skopje, instead of their regular stadium, the Ecolog Arena, in Tetovo, due to renovation works.

12 August 2025 Third qualifying round 2nd leg	Qarabağ (Azerbaijan)	5–1 (6–1 agg.)	(North Macedonia) Shkëndija	Baku, Azerbaijan
20:00 (UTC+4)	Cake 16' (o.g.); Kady 18'; Akhundzade 33'; Janković 35' (pen.); Andrade 59'	Report	Tamba 10'; Cake (yellow card) 35'; Alhassan (yellow card) 48'	Stadium: Tofiq Bahramov Republican Stadium; Attendance: 30,252; Referee: Danny Makkelie (Netherlands)

19 August 2025 Play-off round 1st leg	Ferencváros (Hungary)	1–3	(Azerbaijan) Qarabağ	Budapest, Hungary
23:00 (UTC+4)	Varga 29'; Szalai (yellow card) 90+3'; Pešić (yellow card) 90+5'	Report	Janković 50'; Medina 67'; Silva (yellow card) 69'; Qurbanlı 85'	Stadium: Ferencváros Stadion; Attendance: 19,675; Referee: João Pinheiro (Portugal)

27 August 2025 Play-off round 2nd leg	Qarabağ (Azerbaijan)	2–3 (5–4 agg.)	(Hungary) Ferencváros	Baku, Azerbaijan
20:45 (UTC+4)	Andrade 25'; Bicalho (yellow card) 37'; Zoubir 45'; Medina (yellow card) 53'; Silva (yellow card) 81'	Report	Joseph 12'; Kanichowsky (yellow card) 42'; Varga 55' (pen.); Keïta (yellow card) 56'; Tóth 82'; Cissé (yellow card) 90'	Stadium: Tofiq Bahramov Republican Stadium; Attendance: 29,744; Referee: Clément Turpin (France)

==== League Phase ====
Pos	Team	Pld	W	D	L	GF	GA	GD	Pts	Qualification
20	(Turkish Football Federation) Galatasaray	8	3	1	4	9	11	−2	10	Advance to knockout phase play-offs (unseeded)
21	(French Football Federation) Monaco	8	2	4	2	8	14	−6	10	Advance to knockout phase play-offs (unseeded)
22	(Association of Football Federations of Azerbaijan) Qarabağ	8	3	1	4	13	21	−8	10	Advance to knockout phase play-offs (unseeded)
23	(Norwegian Football Federation) Bodø/Glimt	8	2	3	3	14	15	−1	9	Advance to knockout phase play-offs (unseeded)
24	(Portuguese Football Federation) Benfica	8	3	0	5	10	12	−2	9	Advance to knockout phase play-offs (unseeded)

Source: UEFA
Rules for classification: League phase tiebreakers

16 September 2025 1	Benfica (Portugal)	2–3	(Azerbaijan) Qarabağ	Lisbon, Portugal
23:00 (UTC+4)	Barrenechea 6'; Pavlidis 16'	Report	Andrade 30'; Durán 48'; Kashchuk 86'	Stadium: Estádio da Luz; Attendance: 53,257; Referee: Erik Lambrechts (Belgium)

1 October 2025 2	Qarabağ (Azerbaijan)	2–0	(Denmark) Copenhagen	Baku, Azerbaijan
20:45 (UTC+4)	Zoubir 28'; Silva (yellow card) 74'; Addai 83'; Bayramov (yellow card) 85'; Akhundzade (yellow card) 90+3'	Report	López (yellow card) 50'	Stadium: Republican Stadium; Attendance: 30,250; Referee: Serdar Gözübüyük (Netherlands)

22 October 2025 3	Athletic Bilbao (Spain)	3–1	(Azerbaijan) Qarabağ	Bilbao, Spain
21:45 (UTC+4)	Guruzeta 40', 88'; Navarro 70'	Report	Andrade 1'	Stadium: San Mamés; Attendance: 50,471; Referee: Igor Pajač (Croatia)

5 November 2025 4	Qarabağ (Azerbaijan)	2–2	(England) Chelsea	Baku, Azerbaijan
21:45 (UTC+4)	Andrade 29'; Janković 39' (pen.); Silva (yellow card) 47'; Medina (yellow card) 87'	Report	Estêvão 16'; Santos (yellow card) 44'; James (yellow card) 47'; Garnacho 53'; Caicedo (yellow card) 90+1'	Stadium: Republican Stadium; Attendance: 30,887; Referee: Sebastian Gishamer (Austria)

26 November 2025 5	Napoli (Italy)	2–0	(Azerbaijan) Qarabağ	Naples, Italy
00:00 (UTC+4)	Lang (yellow card) 50'; Højlund (penalty missed) 56'; McTominay 65'; Janković 72' (o.g.); Rrahmani (yellow card) 77'	Report	Medina (yellow card) 43'; Janković (yellow card) 55'	Stadium: Stadio Diego Armando Maradona; Attendance: 32,019; Referee: Szymon Marciniak (Poland)

10 December 2025 6	Qarabağ (Azerbaijan)	2–4	(Netherlands) Ajax	Baku, Azerbaijan
21:45 (UTC+4)	Durán 10'; Silva 47'	Report	Dolberg 39'; Baas (yellow card) 45+1'; Gloukh 79', 90'; Gaaei 83'	Stadium: Republican Stadium; Attendance: 31,090; Referee: Rade Obrenović (Slovenia)

21 January 2026 7	Qarabağ (Azerbaijan)	3–2	(Germany) Eintracht Frankfurt	Baku, Azerbaijan
21:45 (UTC+4)	Duran 4', 80', (yellow card) 83'; Mustafazade 90+4'	Report	Uzun 10'; Kristensen (yellow card) 61'; Chaïbi 78' (pen.); Staff (yellow card) 89'	Stadium: Republican Stadium; Attendance: 27,820; Referee: Sandro Schärer (Switzerland)

29 January 2026 8	Liverpool (England)	6–0	(Azerbaijan) Qarabağ	Liverpool, England
00:00 (UTC+4)	Mac Allister 15', 61'; Wirtz 21'; Salah 50'; Ekitike 57'; Chiesa 90'	Report	Janković (yellow card) 70'	Stadium: Anfield; Attendance: 60,043; Referee: Ivan Kružliak (Slovakia)

==== Knockout phase ====
18 February 2026 Knockout phase play-offs 1st leg	Qarabağ (Azerbaijan)	1–6	(England) Newcastle United	Baku, Azerbaijan
21:45 (UTC+4)	Cafarguliyev 54'	Report	Gordon 3', 32' (pen.), 33', 45+1' (pen.); Thiaw 8' (yellow card) 76'; Murphy 72'	Stadium: Republican Stadium; Attendance: 28,861; Referee: Espen Eskås (Norway)

25 February 2026 Knockout phase play-offs 2nd leg	Newcastle United (England)	3–2 (9–3 agg.)	(Azerbaijan) Qarabağ	Newcastle upon Tyne
00:00 (UTC+4)	Tonali 4'; Joelinton 6'; Botman 52'	Report	Durán 51'; Janković (penalty missed) 57'; Cafarguliyev 57'; Bicalho (yellow card) 80'	Stadium: St James' Park; Attendance: 50,068; Referee: Davide Massa (Italy)

== Squad statistics ==
As of match played 22 May 2026

=== Appearances and goals ===
No.	Pos	Nat	Player	Total		Premier League		Azerbaijan Cup		Champions League	
No.	Pos	Nat	Player	Apps	Goals	Apps	Goals	Apps	Goals	Apps	Goals
1	GK	(Azerbaijan) AZE	Shakhruddin Magomedaliyev	6	0	6	0	0	0	0	0
2	DF	(Brazil) BRA	Matheus Silva	44	2	22+2	1	3+1	0	16	1
3	DF	(Morocco) MAR	Samy Mmaee	15	1	11	1	1	0	0+3	0
8	MF	(Montenegro) MNE	Marko Janković	44	5	14+12	2	3+2	0	11+2	3
9	MF	(Spain) ESP	Joni Montiel	25	5	16+2	5	1+1	0	4+1	0
10	MF	(France) FRA	Abdellah Zoubir	51	9	21+9	7	2+3	0	16	2
11	FW	(Ghana) GHA	Emmanuel Addai	49	8	13+16	5	4+1	2	5+10	1
13	DF	(Azerbaijan) AZE	Behlul Mustafazade	24	1	8	0	0+1	0	15	1
15	MF	(Cape Verde) CPV	Leandro Andrade	51	16	25+6	9	3+2	1	15	6
17	FW	(Colombia) COL	Camilo Durán	45	15	20+10	9	3+2	1	10	5
18	DF	(Brazil) BRA	Dani Bolt	39	1	19+5	1	5	0	2+8	0
20	MF	(Brazil) BRA	Kady Borges	37	6	14+7	3	4	2	10+2	1
21	MF	(Ukraine) UKR	Oleksiy Kashchuk	33	4	12+8	2	1	0	1+11	2
22	FW	(Azerbaijan) AZE	Musa Qurbanlı	38	9	10+12	7	2+3	1	0+11	1
24	DF	(France) FRA	Jeremie Gnali	4	0	0+3	0	1	0	0	0
27	DF	(Azerbaijan) AZE	Toral Bayramov	45	8	20+10	7	3	0	2+10	1
30	DF	(Azerbaijan) AZE	Abbas Hüseynov	9	0	4+3	0	0	0	0+2	0
32	DF	(Azerbaijan) AZE	Hikmat Jabrayilzade	7	0	4+1	0	1	0	0+1	0
35	MF	(Brazil) BRA	Pedro Bicalho	51	1	23+8	1	2+2	0	16	0
44	DF	(Azerbaijan) AZE	Elvin Cafarguliyev	42	2	12+11	0	2+1	0	14+2	2
47	MF	(Azerbaijan) AZE	Mehdi Mutallimli	1	0	0+1	0	0	0	0	0
55	DF	(Azerbaijan) AZE	Badavi Guseynov	21	1	15+1	1	3	0	1+1	0
66	MF	(Azerbaijan) AZE	Hacy Ibrahim	1	0	0+1	0	0	0	0	0
74	DF	(Azerbaijan) AZE	Sabuhi Niftiyev	1	0	0+1	0	0	0	0	0
76	MF	(Azerbaijan) AZE	Nicat Khasiyev	1	0	0+1	0	0	0	0	0
77	FW	(Azerbaijan) AZE	Ramil Sheydayev	19	2	6+4	2	1	0	8	0
80	FW	(Azerbaijan) AZE	Behruz Qurbanli	1	0	1	0	0	0	0	0
81	DF	(Colombia) COL	Kevin Medina	42	2	23	1	3+1	0	15	1
82	MF	(Azerbaijan) AZE	Mahammad Imamaliyev	1	0	1	0	0	0	0	0
89	GK	(Azerbaijan) AZE	Amin Ramazanov	1	0	1	0	0	0	0	0
97	GK	(Croatia) CRO	Fabijan Buntić	7	0	4	0	1+1	0	1	0
99	GK	(Poland) POL	Mateusz Kochalski	41	0	22	0	4	0	15	0
Players away on loan:
Players who left Qarabağ during the season:
6	MF	(Ivory Coast) CIV	Chris Kouakou	19	1	9+3	1	1	0	0+6	0
7	FW	(Azerbaijan) AZE	Nariman Akhundzade	26	7	7+6	3	1	2	7+5	2

=== Goal scorers ===
Place	Position	Nation	Number	Name	Premier League	Azerbaijan Cup	Champions League	Total
1	MF	(Cape Verde)	15	Leandro Andrade	9	1	6	16
2	FW	(Colombia)	17	Camilo Durán	9	1	5	15
3	FW	(Azerbaijan)	22	Musa Qurbanlı	7	1	1	9
3	MF	(France)	10	Abdellah Zoubir	7	0	2	9
5	DF	(Azerbaijan)	27	Toral Bayramov	7	0	1	8
5	FW	(Ghana)	11	Emmanuel Addai	5	2	1	8
7	FW	(Azerbaijan)	7	Nariman Akhundzade	3	2	2	7
8	MF	(Brazil)	20	Kady Borges	3	2	1	6
8				Own goal	3	1	2	6
10	MF	(Spain)	9	Joni Montiel	5	0	0	5
10	MF	(Montenegro)	8	Marko Janković	2	0	3	5
12	MF	(Ukraine)	21	Oleksiy Kashchuk	2	0	2	4
13	FW	(Azerbaijan)	77	Ramil Sheydayev	2	0	0	2
13	DF	(Colombia)	81	Kevin Medina	1	0	1	2
13	DF	(Brazil)	2	Matheus Silva	1	0	1	2
13	DF	(Azerbaijan)	44	Elvin Cafarguliyev	0	0	2	2
17	MF	(Ivory Coast)	6	Chris Kouakou	1	0	0	1
17	DF	(Morocco)	3	Samy Mmaee	1	0	0	1
17	DF	(Azerbaijan)	55	Badavi Guseynov	1	0	0	1
17	MF	(Brazil)	35	Pedro Bicalho	1	0	0	1
17	DF	(Brazil)	18	Dani Bolt	1	0	0	1
17	DF	(Azerbaijan)	13	Behlul Mustafazade	0	0	1	1
				TOTALS	71	10	31	112

=== Clean sheets ===
Place	Position	Nation	Number	Name	Premier League	Azerbaijan Cup	Champions League	Total
1	GK	(Poland)	99	Mateusz Kochalski	7	1	3	11
2	GK	(Azerbaijan)	1	Shakhruddin Magomedaliyev	5	0	0	5
3	GK	(Croatia)	97	Fabijan Buntić	2	0	1	3
				TOTALS	14	0	4	18

=== Disciplinary record ===
Number	Nation	Position	Name	Premier League		Azerbaijan Cup		Champions League		Total	
Number	Nation	Position	Name	Booked	Sent off (straight red)	Booked	Sent off (straight red)	Booked	Sent off (straight red)	Booked	Sent off (straight red)
1	(Azerbaijan)	GK	Shakhruddin Magomedaliyev	2	0	0	0	0	0	2	0
2	(Brazil)	DF	Matheus Silva	7	0	0	0	4	0	11	0
3	(Morocco)	DF	Samy Mmaee	1	0	0	0	0	0	1	0
8	(Montenegro)	MF	Marko Janković	8	0	3	1	2	0	11	1
9	(Spain)	MF	Joni Montiel	4	0	1	0	0	0	5	0
10	(France)	MF	Abdellah Zoubir	1	0	0	0	0	0	1	0
11	(Ghana)	FW	Emmanuel Addai	3	0	0	0	0	0	3	0
13	(Azerbaijan)	DF	Behlul Mustafazade	1	0	0	0	0	0	1	0
15	(Cape Verde)	MF	Leandro Andrade	1	0	0	0	0	0	1	0
17	(Colombia)	FW	Camilo Durán	5	0	1	0	1	0	7	0
18	(Brazil)	DF	Dani Bolt	4	0	0	0	1	0	5	0
20	(Brazil)	MF	Kady Borges	4	1	0	0	1	0	5	1
21	(Ukraine)	MF	Oleksiy Kashchuk	1	0	0	0	1	0	2	0
22	(Azerbaijan)	FW	Musa Qurbanlı	1	0	2	0	0	0	3	0
27	(Azerbaijan)	DF	Toral Bayramov	0	0	0	0	1	0	1	0
35	(Brazil)	MF	Pedro Bicalho	2	0	0	0	2	0	4	0
44	(Azerbaijan)	DF	Elvin Cafarguliyev	0	0	1	0	0	0	1	0
77	(Azerbaijan)	FW	Ramil Sheydayev	1	0	0	0	0	0	1	0
81	(Colombia)	DF	Kevin Medina	4	0	0	0	4	0	8	0
99	(Poland)	GK	Mateusz Kochalski	1	0	0	1	1	0	2	1
Players away on loan:
Players who left Qarabağ during the season:
6	(Ivory Coast)	MF	Chris Kouakou	1	0	0	0	0	0	1	0
7	(Azerbaijan)	FW	Nariman Akhundzade	0	0	0	0	2	0	2	0
			TOTALS	52	1	8	2	20	0	80	3
