= Dani Bolt =

Brazilian footballer (born 1999)

Personal information
- Full name: Daniel Lima de Castro
- Date of birth: 18 June 1999 (age 27)
- Place of birth: Rio de Janeiro, Brazil
- Height: 1.83 m (6 ft 0 in)
- Position: Right-back

Team information
- Current team: Johor Darul Ta'zim
- Number: 20

Youth career
- 2019–2020: Fluminense

Senior career*
Years	Team	Apps	(Gls)
2020–2022	Fluminense	5	(0)
2022–2024	Athletico Paranaense	6	(0)
2022	→ Vitória (loan)	3	(0)
2023	→ Juventude (loan)	25	(1)
2024–2025	Torreense	47	(1)
2025–2026	Qarabağ	25	(1)
2026–	Johor Darul Ta'zim	0	(0)
- * Club domestic league appearances and goals as of 31 August 2026

Daniel Lima de Castro (born 18 June 1999), commonly known as Dani Bolt or simply Daniel, is a Brazilian professional footballer who plays as a right-back for Malaysia Super League side Johor Darul Ta'zim F.C..

== Career ==
Bolt joined the academy of Fluminense in 2019. In mid-2020, Bolt was cut from the Fluminense first team after failing to renew his contract with the club. After the contract situation was resolved, he made a total of five appearances for Fluminense, before agreeing to terminate his contract following the 2021 season.

He moved to Athletico Paranaense in early 2022. He was loaned to Vitória in April 2022, alongside teammate Léo Gomes. For the 2023 season, he was loaned to Juventude.

On 17 January 2024, Bolt left Athletico Paranaense and signed a one-and-a-half-year contract with Liga Portugal 2 club Torreense.

On 17 June 2025, Qarabağ FK signed the football player to a 3+1 year contract, where Bolt wore the number 18 jersey. He left the club on 31 August 2026. He made 43 appearances and scored 1 goal for Qarabağ FK, including 25 domestic league matches.

== Style of play ==
Known for his speed, he is nicknamed Dani Bolt after Jamaican sprinter Usain Bolt.

== Career statistics ==
As of 31 August 2026

Appearances and goals by club, season and competition
Club	Season	League			State League		Cup		Continental		Other		Total	
Club	Season	Division	Apps	Goals	Apps	Goals	Apps	Goals	Apps	Goals	Apps	Goals	Apps	Goals
Fluminense	2020	Série A	1	0	0	0	0	0	—		0	0	1	0
Fluminense	2021	Série A	1	0	3 (Note: Appearances in the Campeonato Carioca)	0	0	0	0	0	0	0	4	0
Fluminense	Total		2	0	3	0	0	0	0	0	0	0	5	0
Athletico Paranaense	2022	Série A	0	0	6 (Note: Appearances in the Campeonato Paranaense)	0	0	0	0	0	0	0	6	0
Athletico Paranaense	2023	Série A	0	0	0	0	0	0	0	0	0	0	0	0
Athletico Paranaense	Total		0	0	6	0	0	0	0	0	0	0	6	0
Vitória (loan)	2022	Série C	3	0	0	0	0	0	–		0	0	3	0
Juventude (loan)	2023	Série B	15	0	10 (Note: Appearances in the Campeonato Gaúcho)	0	1	0	–		0	0	7	0
Torreense	2023–24	Liga Portugal 2	13	0	0	0	0	0	0	0	0	0	13	0
Torreense	2024–25	Liga Portugal 2	34	1	0	0	2	1	0	0	0	0	36	2
Torreense	Total		47	1	0	0	2	1	0	0	0	0	49	2
Qarabağ FK	2025–26	Premier League	25	1	–		5	0	13	0	0	0	43	1
Career total			92	2	19	0	8	1	13	0	0	0	132	3
