= Emmanuel Addai =

Ghanaian footballer (born 2001)

Personal information
- Date of birth: 1 August 2001 (age 25)
- Place of birth: Kumasi, Ghana
- Height: 1.73 m (5 ft 8 in)
- Position: Winger

Team information
- Current team: OH Leuven
- Number: 7

Youth career
- JMG Academy

Senior career*
Years	Team	Apps	(Gls)
2021–2022	Bobigny	20	(6)
2022–2024	Alcorcón	54	(6)
2024–2026	Qarabağ	55	(9)
2026–	OH Leuven	1	(1)
- * Club domestic league appearances and goals as of 27 October 2026

Emmanuel Addai (born 1 August 2001) is a Ghanaian professional footballer who plays as a winger for Jupiler Pro League club OH Leuven.

== Career ==
Born in Kumasi, Addai began his career with JMG Academy in Accra before joining French side FC 93 Bobigny in August 2021. He made his senior debut with the club in the Championnat National 2, scoring six goals in 20 appearances.

On 12 July 2022, Addai signed for Spanish Primera Federación side AD Alcorcón. However, he spent the first half of the season unregistered due to bureaucratic problems, only debuting with the club on 14 January 2023, in a 3–1 home win over Deportivo de La Coruña.

Addai would feature regularly for Alkor after his registration, also scoring the equalizer in a 2–1 home win over CD Castellón on 24 June 2023, which sealed his side's promotion to Segunda División. On 5 July, he renewed his contract with the club for a further year.

Addai made his professional debut on 14 August 2023, coming on as a half-time substitute for Álvaro Bustos in a 4–0 away loss to CD Mirandés.

On 23 August 2024, Addai signed a two-year contract with Qarabağ. On 1 October 2025, he scored his first ever Champions League goal against FC Copenhagen.
