= Mateusz Kochalski =

Polish footballer (born 2000)

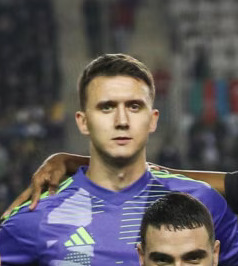
- Kochalski with Qarabağ in 2024

Personal information
- Date of birth: 25 July 2000 (age 26)
- Place of birth: Świdnik, Poland
- Height: 1.90 m (6 ft 3 in)
- Position: Goalkeeper

Team information
- Current team: Wieczysta Kraków
- Number: 77

Youth career
- –2015: BKS Lublin
- 2015–2017: Legia Warsaw

Senior career*
Years	Team	Apps	(Gls)
2017–2020	Legia Warsaw II	2	(0)
2018	→ Legionovia Legionowo (loan)	10	(0)
2018–2020	→ Radomiak Radom (loan)	25	(0)
2020–2022	Legia Warsaw	0	(0)
2020–2021	→ Radomiak Radom (loan)	34	(0)
2021–2022	→ Radomiak Radom (loan)	1	(0)
2022–2024	Stal Mielec	37	(0)
2024–2026	Qarabağ	41	(0)
2026–	Wieczysta Kraków	8	(0)

International career
2015–2016	Poland U16	2	(0)
2016	Poland U17	2	(0)
2018	Poland U18	2	(0)
2018	Poland U19	2	(0)
- * Club domestic league appearances and goals as of 12:44, 10 November 2026 (UTC)

Mateusz Kochalski (born 25 July 2000) is a Polish professional footballer who plays as a goalkeeper for Ekstraklasa club Wieczysta Kraków.

== Club career ==
On 21 August 2020, Kochalski returned to Radomiak Radom on a season-long loan.

On 21 June 2022, Kochalski left Legia after seven years to join Stal Mielec on a three-year deal. After spending a year as back-up for first-choice goalkeeper Bartosz Mrozek, Kochalski was promoted to the starting line-up from the start of the 2023–24 campaign. Across the season, he kept nine clean sheets in 33 appearances, and made 111 saves, twelve more than any of his peers. At the conclusion of the season, Kochalski was named the Ekstraklasa Goalkeeper of the Season.

On 15 August 2024, Kochalski moved to Azerbaijani club Qarabağ on a three-year contract, with an option for a further year, for an undisclosed fee.

On 8 September 2026, Wieczysta Kraków announced the signing of Kochalski on a three-year deal.

== International career ==
A former youth international, Kochalski received his first senior team call-up in June 2024, replacing the injured Oliwier Zych for Poland's preparation camp ahead of the UEFA Euro 2024.

== Career statistics ==
As of match played 7 November 2026

Appearances and goals by club, season and competition
Club	Season	League			National cup (Note: Includes Polish Cup, Azerbaijan Cup)		Europe		Other		Total	
Club	Season	Division	Apps	Goals	Apps	Goals	Apps	Goals	Apps	Goals	Apps	Goals
Legia Warsaw II	2016–17	III liga, group I	0	0	—		—		—		0	0
Legia Warsaw II	2017–18	III liga, group I	0	0	—		—		—		0	0
Legia Warsaw II	2020–21	III liga, group I	2	0	—		—		—		2	0
Legia Warsaw II	Total		2	0	0	0	—		—		2	0
Legionovia (loan)	2017–18	II liga	10	0	—		—		—		10	0
Radomiak Radom (loan)	2018–19	II liga	11	0	1	0	—		—		12	0
Radomiak Radom (loan)	2019–20	I liga	14	0	0	0	—		—		14	0
Radomiak Radom (loan)	2020–21	I liga	34	0	3	0	—		—		37	0
Radomiak Radom (loan)	2021–22	Ekstraklasa	1	0	1	0	—		—		2	0
Radomiak Radom (loan)	Total		60	0	5	0	—		—		65	0
Legia Warsaw	2021–22	Ekstraklasa	0	0	0	0	0	0	0	0	0	0
Stal Mielec	2022–23	Ekstraklasa	0	0	1	0	—		—		1	0
Stal Mielec	2023–24	Ekstraklasa	33	0	0	0	—		—		33	0
Stal Mielec	2024–25	Ekstraklasa	4	0	—		—		—		4	0
Stal Mielec	Total		37	0	1	0	—		—		38	0
Qarabağ	2024–25	Azerbaijan Premier League	17	0	4	0	7 (Note: One appearance in UEFA Champions League, six appearances in UEFA Europa League)	0	—		28	0
Qarabağ	2025–26	Azerbaijan Premier League	22	0	3	0	15 (Note: Appearance(s) in UEFA Champions League)	0	—		40	0
Qarabağ	2026–27	Azerbaijan Premier League	2	0	—		5 (Note: Four appearances in UEFA Champions League, one appearance in UEFA Conference League)	0	—		7	0
Qarabağ	Total		41	0	7	0	27	0	—		75	0
Wieczysta Kraków	2026–27	Ekstraklasa	8	0	—		—		—		8	0
Career total			158	0	13	0	27	0	0	0	198	0

== Honours ==
Radomiak Radom

- I liga: 2020–21
- II liga: 2018–19

Qarabağ

- Azerbaijan Premier League: 2024–25

Individual

- Ekstraklasa Goalkeeper of the Season: 2023–24
