= Camilo Durán =

Colombian footballer (born 2002)

Personal information
- Full name: Camilo Andrés Durán Márquez
- Date of birth: 10 February 2002 (age 24)
- Place of birth: Santa Marta, Colombia
- Height: 1.78 m (5 ft 10 in)
- Position: Forward

Team information
- Current team: Celtic
- Number: 11

Youth career
- Cozi Córner Niko
- Huracán La Ocho
- 2015–2022: Independiente Medellín
- 2021–2022: → Flamengo (loan)

Senior career*
Years	Team	Apps	(Gls)
2022–2023	Lusitânia	20	(19)
2023	Estrela da Amadora B	3	(3)
2023–2024	Lusitânia	18	(12)
2024–2025	Portimonense	29	(5)
2025–2026	Qarabağ	30	(9)
2026–	Celtic	14	(8)

International career^{‡}
2026–	Colombia	2	(0)
- * Club domestic league appearances and goals as of 21 November 2026 ‡ National team caps and goals as of 6 October 2026

Camilo Andrés Durán Márquez (born 10 February 2002) is a Colombian professional footballer who plays as a forward for Scottish Premiership club Celtic and the Colombia national team.

A youth product of Independiente Medellín, Durán spent time with the under-20 side of Flamengo before moving to Portugal in 2022, where he began his senior career in the fifth tier with Lusitânia of the Azores. He helped the club to successive promotions, reaching Liga 3 in 2024, before joining Liga Portugal 2 club Portimonense. In August 2025 he signed for Qarabağ, and scored five goals in his first UEFA Champions League campaign, beginning with a goal on his debut in the club's first win in the competition proper. He joined Celtic in July 2026 in a transfer reported as a record sale for Qarabağ.

Durán received his first call-up to the Colombia national football team in September 2026.

== Early life ==
Durán was born on 10 February 2002 in Santa Marta, and grew up in a poor neighbourhood of the city as the youngest son of Hugo Durán, a bicycle repairman. He joined the local youth club Cozi Córner Niko at the age of nine and later played for Huracán La Ocho.

== Club career ==
=== Youth career ===
After interest from Unión Magdalena fell through when he was 13, Durán joined the academy of Independiente Medellín in 2015 on the recommendation of scout Humberto "Tucho" Ortiz. He arrived as a midfielder and was converted into a forward by his under-15 coach, Sebastián Botero, scoring 38 goals in one season while playing above his age group. On 26 March 2021, he scored the winning goal in the 76th minute of the final of the Liga Antioqueña's Primera A against Estudiantes de Medellín.

In September 2021, Durán joined Flamengo on loan until the end of 2022, with two options to buy, and was assigned to the club's under-20 side.

=== Lusitânia and Estrela da Amadora ===
In 2022, Durán moved to Portugal to join Lusitânia of Angra do Heroísmo, then competing in the Azores regional championship, the fifth tier of Portuguese football. He scored 19 goals in 20 matches in the 2022–23 season as Lusitânia won the Azores championship and the Angra do Heroísmo Football Association cup, earning promotion to the Campeonato de Portugal.

On 9 July 2023, with his contract at Lusitânia having expired, Durán joined Primeira Liga club Estrela da Amadora on a free transfer to play for their under-23 side under Sérgio Vieira. He scored three goals in three matches for the club's B team, before returning to Lusitânia, where he scored 12 goals as the club, coached by Ricardo Pessoa, won promotion from the Campeonato de Portugal to Liga 3 in May 2024.

=== Portimonense ===
On 3 September 2024, Durán signed a four-year contract with Liga Portugal 2 club Portimonense, reuniting with Pessoa, who had become the club's coach. He scored five goals in 26 league appearances in the 2024–25 Liga Portugal 2 season.

=== Qarabağ ===
On 25 August 2025, Durán joined Azerbaijan Premier League club Qarabağ. Three weeks later, on 16 September, he made his UEFA Champions League debut away to Benfica at the Estádio da Luz; with Qarabağ trailing 2–0, he scored their second goal two minutes after half-time with an angled finish from a Marko Janković pass, and they went on to win 3–2. The result was the club's first victory in the Champions League proper, and Durán was named man of the match.

He also scored in a 4–2 defeat to Ajax, and scored twice in a 3–2 win over Eintracht Frankfurt that all but secured Qarabağ's place in the knockout phase. In the knockout phase play-offs, Qarabağ were eliminated 9–3 on aggregate by Newcastle United; Durán scored in the 3–2 second-leg defeat at St James' Park. He finished the season with 15 goals in all competitions, including five in the Champions League.

=== Celtic ===
On 10 July 2026, Durán joined Celtic on a five-year contract, becoming manager Martin O'Neill's first signing of the summer. The fee was reported as around £6 million including add-ons, and Colombian media described it as the highest transfer fee Qarabağ had ever received.

On 19 August 2026, Durán scored twice in a 3–0 home win over LASK in the first leg of the Champions League play-off round, after which O'Neill described his display as "a world-class performance". Celtic lost the second leg 5–1 and were eliminated 5–4 on aggregate, entering the Europa League instead. Durán was named the SPFL Player of the Month for August 2026.

== International career ==
In September 2026, Durán received his first call-up to the senior Colombia national football team from head coach Néstor Lorenzo, for friendlies against Mexico, Paraguay and Peru.

== Style of play ==
Durán is a left-footed forward who can play on either wing or through the centre. He was a midfielder until the age of 15, when he was converted into a striker at Independiente Medellín, and his youth coach Sebastián Botero has credited his composure in front of goal.

== Career statistics ==
=== Club ===
As of match played 21 November 2026

Appearances and goals by club, season and competition
Club	Season	League			National cup (Note: Includes Taça de Portugal, Azerbaijan Cup)		League cup (Note: Includes Scottish League Cup)		Europe		Total	
Club	Season	Division	Apps	Goals	Apps	Goals	Apps	Goals	Apps	Goals	Apps	Goals
Portimonense	2024–25	Liga Portugal 2	26	5	1	0	—		—		27	5
Portimonense	2025–26	Liga Portugal 2	3	0	—		—		—		3	0
Portimonense	Total		29	5	1	0	—		—		30	5
Qarabağ	2025–26	Azerbaijan Premier League	30	9	5	1	—		10 (Note: Appearances in UEFA Champions League)	5	45	15
Celtic	2026–27	Scottish Premiership	14	8	0	0	2	1	6 (Note: Two appearances and two goals in UEFA Champions League, four appearances and three goals in UEFA Europa League)	5	22	14
Career total			73	22	6	1	2	1	16	10	97	34

=== International ===
As of match played 6 October 2026

Appearances and goals by national team and year
National team	Year	Apps	Goals
Colombia	2026	2	0
Total		2	0

== Honours ==
Lusitânia

- Azores Championship: 2022–23

Individual

- SPFL Player of the Month: August 2026
