= Chris Kouakou =

Ivorian footballer (born 1999)

Personal information
- Full name: Banhourin Chris Emmanuel Kouakou
- Date of birth: 15 December 1999 (age 26)
- Place of birth: Abidjan, Ivory Coast
- Height: 1.75 m (5 ft 9 in)
- Position: Midfielder

Senior career*
Years	Team	Apps	(Gls)
2018–2022	CS Sfaxien	43	(1)
2022–2023	FC Midtjylland	1	(0)
2023–2025	Mafra	78	(2)
2025–2026	Qarabağ	9	(1)
2026	Sarpsborg 08	0	(0)
- * Club domestic league appearances and goals as of 1 December 2025

Banhourin Chris Emmanuel Kouakou (born 15 December 1999), known as Chris Kouakou, is an Ivorian professional footballer who plays as a midfielder.

== Club career ==
Kouakou signed with Midtjylland in Denmark in the summer of 2022

On 11 January 2023, Kouakou signed a three-and-a-half-year contract with Mafra in Liga Portugal 2.

On 11 July 2025, he signed a 2+2 year contract with the Azerbaijan Premier League side Qarabağ.
