= Pedro Bicalho =

Brazilian footballer

Personal information
- Full name: Pedro Henrique Rodrigues Bicalho
- Date of birth: 23 April 2001 (age 25)
- Place of birth: São José dos Campos, Brazil
- Height: 1.80 m (5 ft 11 in)
- Position: Midfielder

Team information
- Current team: Qarabağ
- Number: 35

Youth career
- São José-SP
- Portuguesa
- –2020: Cruzeiro
- 2020–2021: Palmeiras

Senior career*
Years	Team	Apps	(Gls)
2020	Cruzeiro	4	(1)
2021–2025	Palmeiras	9	(0)
2022–2023	→ Santa Clara (loan)	5	(0)
2023	→ Vitória (loan)	2	(0)
2023–2025	→ Alverca (loan)	50	(2)
2025–	Qarabağ	31	(1)
- * Club domestic league appearances and goals as of 22 June 2026

Pedro Henrique Rodrigues Bicalho (born 23 April 2001), known as Pedro Bicalho, is a Brazilian professional footballer who plays as a midfielder for Azerbaijani Premier League side Qarabağ.

== Career ==
On 20 June 2025, Bicalho signed a three-year contract with Qarabağ in Azerbaijan.

== Career statistics ==
As of match played 9 March 2023

Appearances and goals by club, season and competition
Club	Season	League			State League		National cup		League cup		Continental		Other		Total	
Club	Season	Division	Apps	Goals	Apps	Goals	Apps	Goals	Apps	Goals	Apps	Goals	Apps	Goals	Apps	Goals
Cruzeiro	2020	Série B	0	0	4 (Note: Appearances in Campeonato Mineiro)	1	2	0	—		—		—		6	1
Palmeiras	2021	Série A	3	0	4 (Note: Appearance(s) in Campeonato Paulista)	0	0	0	—		0	0	0	0	7	0
Palmeiras	2022	Série A	1	0	1	0	0	0	—		0	0	0	0	2	0
Palmeiras	Total		4	0	5	0	0	0	—		0	0	0	0	9	0
Santa Clara (loan)	2022–23	Primeira Liga	5	0	—		1	0	3	0	—		—		9	0
Vitória (loan)	2023	Série B	0	0	2 (Note: Appearances in Campeonato Baiano)	0	0	0	—		—		3 (Note: Appearances in Copa do Nordeste)	0	5	0
Alverca (loan)	2023–24	Liga 3	0	0	—		0	0	—		—		—		0	0
Career total			9	0	11	1	3	0	3	0	0	0	3	0	29	1

== Honours ==
Palmeiras

- Copa Libertadores: 2021
