= List of Azerbaijan international footballers =

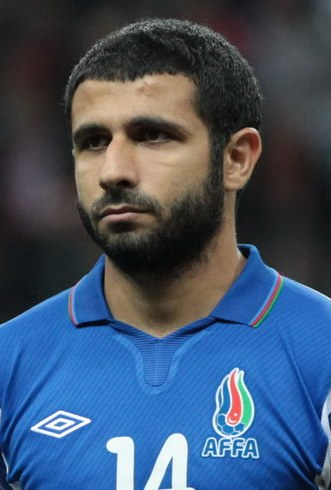
Rashad Sadygov is Azerbaijan's most capped player of all time with 111 caps.

The Azerbaijan national football team has represented Azerbaijan in international association football since 1992, after the country declared independence following the dissolution of the Soviet Union in 1991. Prior to this, Azerbaijani players had represented the Soviet Union national football team, most notably Anatoliy Banishevskiy. Azerbaijan played their first official international match on 17 September 1992 in a friendly against neighbouring country Georgia which ended in a 6–3 defeat for Azerbaijan. They are governed by the Association of Football Federations of Azerbaijan (AFFA) and compete as a member of the Union of European Football Associations (UEFA), which encompasses the countries of Europe and Israel, after becoming members in 1994, also joining FIFA the same year. As of March 2019, Azerbaijan have played 242 international matches since their debut, winning 47, drawing 66 and losing 129. Azerbaijan have played Moldova and Uzbekistan most frequently, meeting each side ten times. In global and continental competitions, Azerbaijan have competed in qualification groups for both the FIFA World Cup, since 1994, and the UEFA European Championship, since 1996, but have failed to qualify for any tournament finals.

Defender Rashad Sadygov is Azerbaijan's most capped player of all time and is the only player to have accumulated 100 caps for the national team. As of March 2019, Sadygov has played 110 times for the country having made his debut in 2001, against Sweden, and received his last cap in 2017. Gurban Gurbanov, who accumulated 66 caps during his international career, is the country's highest scorer of all time with 12 goals and is the only player to have scored ten or more goals for Azerbaijan as of March 2019.

The first player to accumulate 25 caps for Azerbaijan was Tarlan Ahmadov, on 2 April 1997 in a 2–1 defeat to Finland. He finished his career with 74 caps for the national team, holding the cap record until 2007 when it was surpassed by Aslan Kerimov who earned 78 caps before retiring. In September 2012, the current holder Sadygov overtook Kerimov's cap record and went on to reach 100 caps in October 2015.

== List ==
Appearances and goals are composed of FIFA World Cup and UEFA European Championship and each competition's required qualification matches, as well as numerous international friendly tournaments and matches. Players are listed by the number of caps. If the number of caps is equal, the players are then listed alphabetically. Statistics updated following match played on 25 March 2019.

Note: Azerbaijan has played three matches that are not recognised by FIFA as full internationals but are counted by the AFFA. These caps are not counted in the table below and the notes column lists which players appeared in the matches. The matches are:

- A match against Kazakhstan U21 on 8 June 1993.
- A match against a Cyprus XI on 20 February 1996, that was not designated as the official Cypriot team.
- A match against Iran U23 on 8 August 2002.

| | Key |
|---|---|
| * | Still active for the national team (Note: Players who are still active for the national team are players who have not retired from international football and are, subsequently, eligible to be called up.) |
| = | Player is tied for the number of caps |
| GK | Goalkeeper |
| DF | Defender |
| MF | Midfielder |
| FW | Forward |

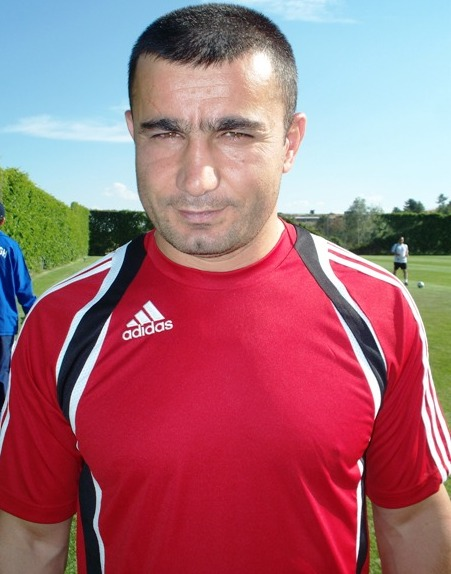
Gurban Gurbanov is Azerbaijan's top international goalscorer of all time with 12 goals.

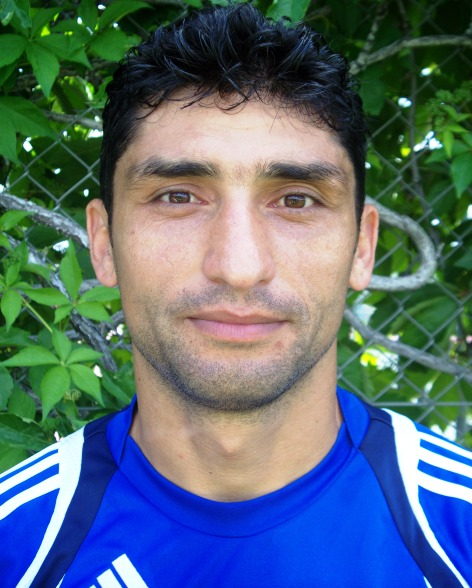
Aslan Kerimov made 78 appearances for Azerbaijan and held the all-time cap record between 2007 and 2012.

Azerbaijan national team footballers with at least 25 appearances
| No. | Name | Position | National team career | Caps | Goals | Notes |
|---|---|---|---|---|---|---|
| 1 | Rashad Sadygov* | DF | 2001–2017 | 111 | 5 | (Note: Played in match against Iran U23 that is not recognised by FIFA.) |
| 2 | Kamran Agayev* | GK | 2008–2018 | 79 | 0 | |
| 3 | Aslan Kerimov | DF | 1994–2008 | 78 | 0 | (Note: RSSSF attributes Kerimov with one goal but all other sources award the goal to Kanan Karimov.) (Note: Played in match against a Cyprus XI that is not recognised by FIFA.) |
| 4 | Mahir Shukurov* | DF | 2004–2014 | 76 | 4 | |
| 5 | Tarlan Ahmadov | DF | 1992–2005 | 73 | 0 | |
| 6 | Mahmud Gurbanov | MF | 1994–2008 | 70 | 1 | |
| 7 | Gurban Gurbanov | FW | 1992–2005 | 66 | 12 | (Note: Played in match against Kazakhstan U21 that is not recognised by FIFA.) |
| 8 | Emin Agayev | DF | 1992–2005 | 65 | 1 | |
| 9 | Vugar Nadirov* | FW | 2004–2015 | 61 | 4 | |
| 10 | Rahid Amirguliyev* | MF | 2007–2018 | 60 | 3 | |
| 11 | Vagif Javadov* | FW | 2006–2014 | 58 | 9 | |
| 12 | Ruslan Abyshov* | DF | 2009–2018 | 56 | 4 | |
| 13 | Maksim Medvedev* | DF | 2009–2019 | 55 | 3 | |
| 14= | Aleksandr Chertoganov* | MF | 2006–2012 | 54 | 0 | |
| 14= | Javid Huseynov* | MF | 2008–2018 | 54 | 2 | |
| 16 | Emin Quliyev | MF | 2000–2008 | 51 | 3 | |
| 17 | Gara Garayev* | MF | 2013–2019 | 50 | 0 | |
| 18 | Rauf Aliyev* | FW | 2010–2018 | 47 | 7 | |
| 19= | Samir Abbasov* | DF | 2004–2010 | 46 | 0 | |
| 19= | Kamal Guliyev | MF | 2000–2005 | 46 | 0 | |
| 21 | Vyacheslav Lychkin | MF | 1995–2001 | 45 | 4 | |
| 22 | Emin Imamaliyev | MF | 2000–2007 | 44 | 0 | |
| 23 | Arif Asadov | DF | 1993–2002 | 43 | 0 | |
| 24= | Afran Ismayilov* | MF | 2010–2018 | 40 | 5 | |
| 24= | Rail Malikov* | DF | 2004–2011 | 40 | 0 | |
| 24= | Branimir Subašić* | FW | 2007–2013 | 40 | 7 | |
| 24= | Zaur Tagizade | MF | 1997–2008 | 40 | 6 | |
| 28= | Rasim Abushev | MF | 1993–1999 | 39 | 3 | |
| 28= | Dimitrij Nazarov* | FW | 2014–2019 | 39 | 6 | |
| 30 | Elnur Allahverdiyev* | DF | 2008–2014 | 38 | 0 | |
| 31= | Badavi Huseynov* | DF | 2012–2019 | 37 | 0 | |
| 31= | Elvin Mammadov* | MF | 2008–2017 | 37 | 7 | |
| 33 | Vidadi Rzayev | MF | 1992–2001 | 35 | 5 | |
| 34= | Samir Aliyev | FW | 1997–2007 | 34 | 4 | |
| 34= | Yunis Huseynov | FW | 1993–1998 | 34 | 4 | |
| 34= | Jahangir Hasanzade | GK | 1998–2007 | 34 | 0 | |
| 34= | Vadim Vasilyev | FW | 1999–2004 | 34 | 2 | |
| 34= | Ilham Yadullayev | DF | 1998–2004 | 34 | 0 | |
| 39= | Araz Abdullayev* | MF | 2008–2019 | 33 | 3 | |
| 39= | Farrukh Ismayilov | FW | 1998–2007 | 33 | 5 | |
| 39= | Dmitry Kramarenko | GK | 1992–2005 | 33 | 0 | |
| 42 | Farhad Valiyev* | GK | 2006–2010 | 32 | 0 | |
| 43= | Elmar Bakhshiyev | MF | 2004–2014 | 30 | 0 | |
| 43= | Ilgar Gurbanov* | DF | 2004–2018 | 30 | 1 | |
| 45 | Ruslan Musayev | MF | 1997–2004 | 29 | 0 | |
| 46= | Rufat Guliyev | MF | 1997–2003 | 28 | 0 | |
| 46= | Volodimir Levin* | DF | 2008–2013 | 28 | 0 | |
| 46= | Sasha Yunisoglu | DF | 2007–2011 | 28 | 0 | |
| 49 | Rashad Sadygov* | MF | 2010–2015 | 26 | 0 | |
| 50= | Aftandil Hajiyev | DF | 2000–2006 | 25 | 0 | |
| 50= | Nadir Nabiyev | FW | 2002–2006 | 25 | 3 | |
| 50= | Ruslan Gurbanov* | FW | 2015–2018 | 25 | 1 | |

== See also ==
- Azerbaijan national football team results
