= Azerbaijani Footballer of the Year =

Annual award for Azerbaijani footballers

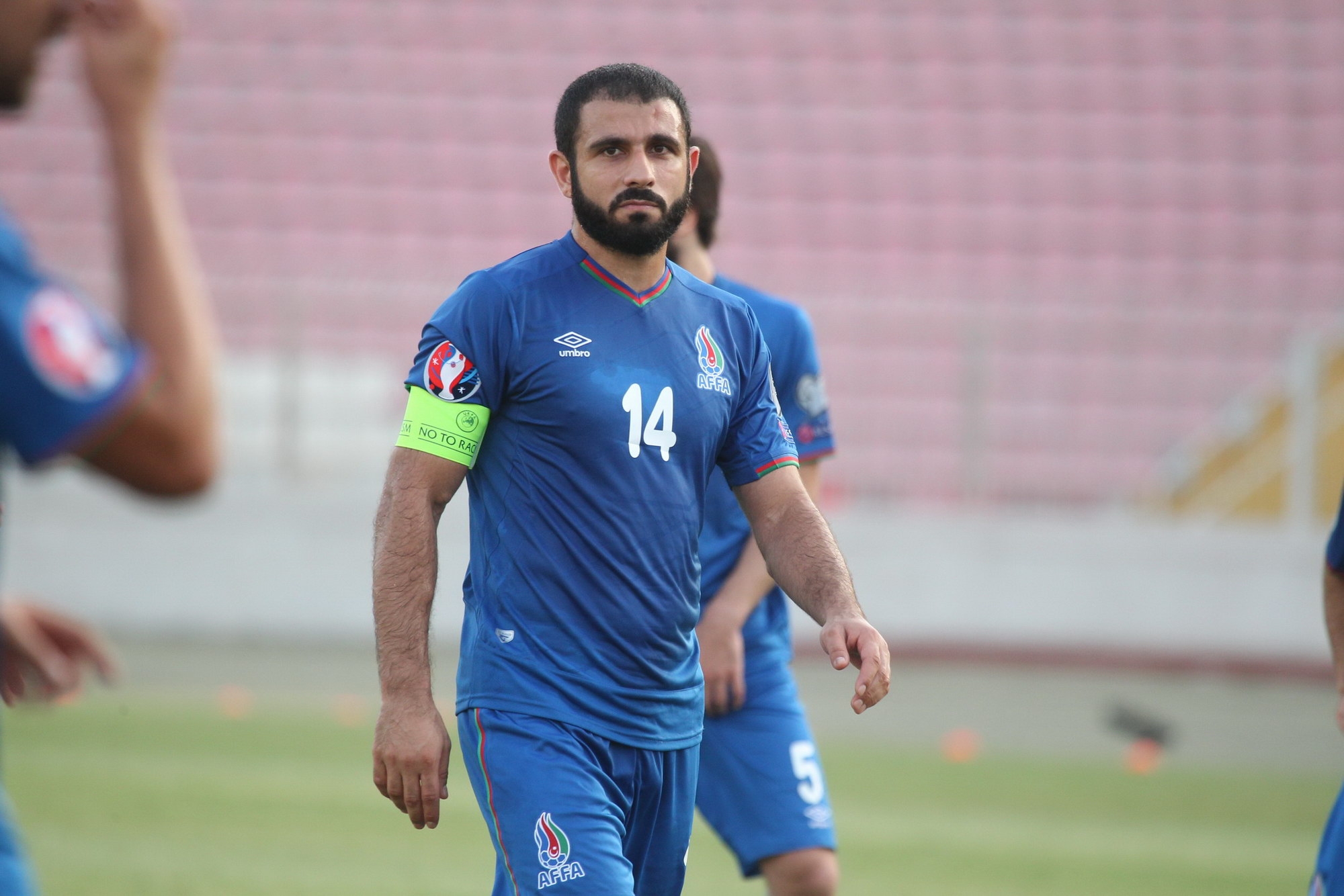
Rashad Sadygov has already been chosen as the Azerbaijani Footballer of the Year six times and has the most awards.

Azerbaijani Footballer of the Year is an annual title awarded to the best Azerbaijani football player of the year. The award has been given since 1991, and the winner is elected by authorized journalists from the leading Azerbaijani sport media. On the same occasion, an award is also given for Azerbaijani Football Goalkeeper of the Year since 2009. However, this award is not always given annually.

== History ==
The same year the Association of Football Federations of Azerbaijan was founded, an award for the best Azerbaijani Footballer of the Year began being annually given. The first award was given to former Azerbaijan national football team striker Samir Alakbarov in 1991, and was further awarded in succession in 1992 and 1993. The Azerbaijan national football team captain Rashad Sadygov has the most awards at six. The striker Vagif Javadov became the youngest player to win the award in 2009 at the age of 20. The midfielder Mahmud Gurbanov became the oldest player to win the award in 2007 at the age of 34. The award was not given in 1995.

The first Azerbaijani Football Goalkeeper of the Year award was given to Kamran Agayev in 2009, and was further awarded in succession in 2011 and 2012. Both awards are given at the end of the football season.

== List of Azerbaijani Footballer of the Year recipients ==
Season	Winner	Club	Runner-up	Third place
1991	Samir Alakbarov	(Azerbaijan) Neftchi Baku		
1992	Samir Alakbarov	(Azerbaijan) Neftchi Baku		
1993	Samir Alakbarov	(Azerbaijan) Neftchi Baku		
1994	Yunis Huseynov	(Azerbaijan) Neftchi Baku		
1995	Not awarded			
1996	Vidadi Rzayev	(Azerbaijan) Neftchi Baku		
1997	Faig Jabbarov	(Azerbaijan) Kapaz		
1998	Yunis Huseynov	(Azerbaijan) Kapaz		
1999	Tarlan Ahmadov	(Azerbaijan) Neftchi Baku	Zaur Tagizade	Gurban Gurbanov
2000	Emin Agayev	(Russia) Torpedo-ZIL Moscow	Tarlan Ahmadov	Emin Guliyev
2001	Zaur Tagizade	(Azerbaijan) Shafa Baku	Jahangir Hasanzade	Mahmud Gurbanov
2002	Samir Aliyev	(Azerbaijan) Neftchi Baku	Kamal Quliyev	Tarlan Ahmadov
2003	Gurban Gurbanov	(Russia) Volgar Astrakhan	Farrukh Ismayilov	Kamal Quliyev
2004	Rashad Sadygov	(Azerbaijan) Neftchi Baku	Zaur Ramazanov	Emin Guliyev
2005	Rashad Sadygov	(Turkey) Kayserispor	Zaur Tagizade	Anatoli Ponomarev
2006	Jeyhun Sultanov	(Azerbaijan) FC Baku	Farhad Veliyev	André Luiz Ladaga
2007	Mahmud Gurbanov	(Azerbaijan) Inter Baku	Zaur Ramazanov	Branimir Subašić
2008	Kamran Agayev	(Azerbaijan) Khazar Lankaran	Rashad Sadygov	Zaur Ramazanov
2009	Vagif Javadov	(Azerbaijan) Qarabağ	Rashad Sadygov	Mahir Shukurov
2010	Rashad Sadygov	(Turkey) Kocaelispor	Kamran Agayev	Ruslan Abishov
2011	Rauf Aliyev	(Azerbaijan) Qarabağ	Afran Ismayilov	Ruslan Abishov
2012	Ruslan Abishov	(Azerbaijan) Khazar Lankaran	Javid Imamverdiyev	Vugar Nadirov
2013	Rashad Sadygov	(Azerbaijan) Qarabağ	Rauf Aliyev	Kamran Agayev, Ruslan Abishov, Mahir Shukurov
2014	Gara Garayev	(Azerbaijan) Qarabağ	Badavi Guseynov	Rashad Sadygov
2015	Rahid Amirguliyev	(Azerbaijan) Qarabağ	Rashad Sadygov	Badavi Guseynov
2016	Rashad Sadygov	(Azerbaijan) Qarabağ	Maksim Medvedev	Kamran Aghayev
2017	Rashad Sadygov	(Azerbaijan) Qarabağ	Mahir Madatov	Gara Garayev
2018	Mirabdulla Abbasov	(Azerbaijan) Neftchi Baku	Maksim Medvedev	Gara Garayev
2019	Emil Balayev	(Kazakhstan) FC Tobol	Ramil Sheydayev	Bahlul Mustafazade
2020	Gara Garayev	(Azerbaijan) Qarabağ	Shahrudin Mahammadaliyev	Namik Alaskarov
2021	Emin Mahmudov	(Azerbaijan) Neftchi Baku	Mahir Emreli	Gara Garayev, Shahrudin Mahammadaliyev, Filip Ozobić
2022	Emin Mahmudov	(Azerbaijan) Neftchi Baku		
2023	Bəhlul Mustafazadə	(Azerbaijan) Qarabağ		
2024	Toral Bayramov	(Azerbaijan) Qarabağ		
2025	Elvin Cafarguliyev	(Azerbaijan) Qarabağ	Bəhlul Mustafazadə	Toral Bayramov

=== Players awarded multiple times ===
Player	Number	Years
Rashad Sadygov	6	2004, 2005, 2010, 2013, 2016, 2017
Samir Alakbarov	3	1991, 1992, 1993
Yunis Huseinov	2	1994, 1998
Gara Garayev	2	2014, 2020
Emin Mahmudov	2	2021, 2022

== List of Azerbaijani Football Goalkeeper of the Year recipients ==
Year	Player	Club
2009	Kamran Agayev (AZE)	Khazar Lankaran
2011	Kamran Agayev (AZE)	Khazar Lankaran
2012	Kamran Agayev (AZE)	Khazar Lankaran
