= Azerbaijan national football team results =

This page shows the Azerbaijan national football team's results history:

== Overview of results ==
As of Match played 1 October 2026

Type	Record						
Type	G	W	D	L	GF	GA	Won %
Friendly Matches	133	38	45	50	109	153	28.57
FIFA World Cup qualification	72	7	16	42	39	120	9.72
UEFA European Championship Qualification	69	9	10	49	44	157	13.04
UEFA Nations League	23	6	10	9	11	24	26.09
Other Tournaments	10	5	2	3	14	9	50
Total	318	65	83	170	209	463	20.44

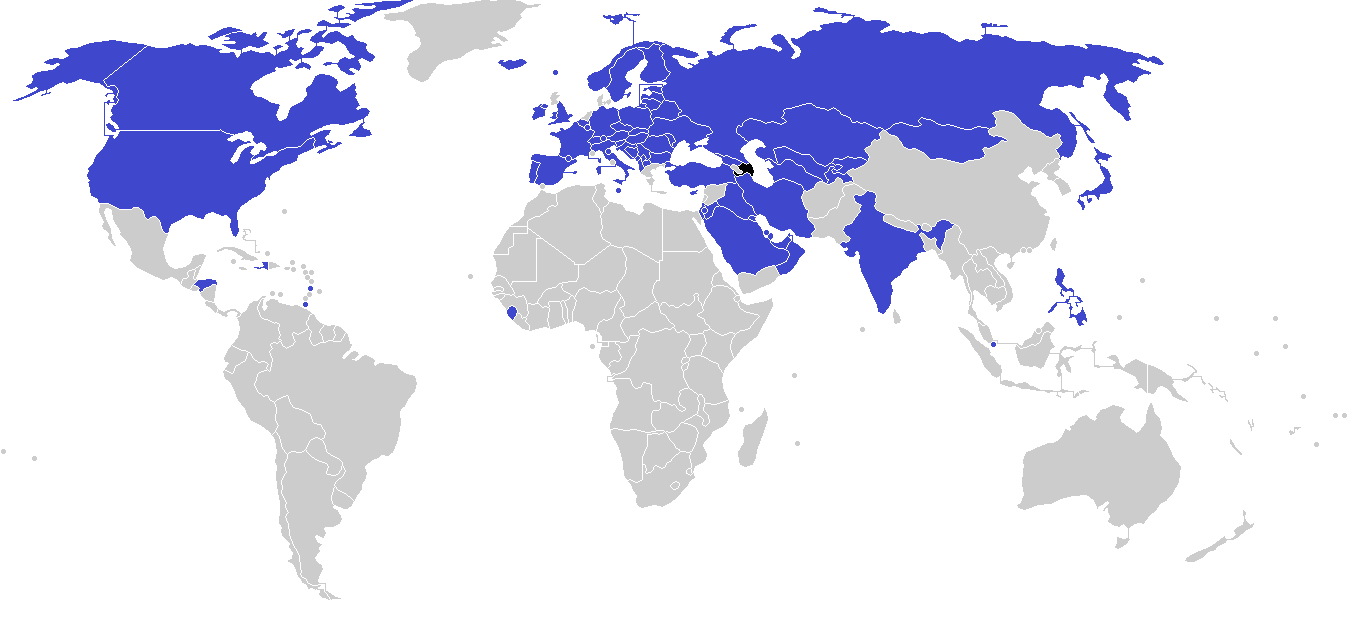
Opponents of Azerbaijan men's national football team

== Record versus other countries ==
Key
Positive balance (more wins than losses.)
Neutral balance (equal number of wins and losses)
Negative balance (more losses than wins)

As of match played 4 October 2026

Opponents	Played	Won	Drawn*	Lost	GF	GA	GD	% Performance	% Won
Albania	6	1	1	4	4	8	-3	40	16.67
Andorra	5	1	4	0	2	1	+1	100	20
Austria	7	0	1	6	2	15	-13	14.29	0
Bahrain	3	3	0	0	8	3	+5	100	100
Belarus	7	3	2	2	7	6	+1	71.43	42.86
Belgium	6	0	1	5	2	12	-10	16.67	0
Bosnia and Herzegovina	1	0	0	1	0	1	-1	0	0
Bulgaria	4	0	2	2	2	5	-3	33.34	0
Canada	1	0	1	0	1	1	0	100	0
Croatia	4	0	2	2	2	9	-7	50	0
Cyprus	2	1	1	0	1	0	+1	100	50
Czech Republic	3	1	1	1	3	2	+1	66.67	33.33
England	2	0	0	2	0	3	-3	0	0
Estonia	12	2	6	4	9	12	-3	58.33	16.67
Faroe Islands	3	3	0	0	8	0	+8	100	100
Finland	8	1	0	7	5	15	-10	12.5	12.5
France	4	0	0	4	1	18	-17	0	0
Georgia	6	2	2	2	6	8	-2	66.67	33.33
Germany	6	0	0	6	4	24	-20	0	0
Haiti	1	0	0	1	0	3	-3	0	0
Honduras	1	0	1	0	0	0	0	100	0
Hungary	8	0	0	8	3	21	-18	0	0
Iceland	3	0	1	2	1	8	-7	0	0
India	1	1	0	0	3	0	+3	100	100
Iran	3	0	1	2	2	4	-2	33.34	0
Iraq	1	0	0	1	0	1	-1	0	0
Israel	5	0	2	3	2	12	-10	40	0
Italy	4	0	0	4	2	11	-9	0	0
Japan	1	0	0	1	0	2	-2	0	0
Jordan	3	2	1	0	5	2	+3	100	66.67
Kazakhstan	12	4	3	5	15	17	-2	41.67	33.33
Kosovo	2	0	1	1	0	4	-4	50	0
Kuwait	2	0	2	0	2	2	0	100	0
Kyrgyzstan	4	3	1	0	7	2	+5	100	75
Latvia	6	1	4	1	5	4	+1	80	16.67
Liechtenstein	6	3	2	1	8	2	+6	80	60
Lithuania	6	2	3	1	4	3	+1	75	25
Luxembourg	7	1	3	3	6	9	-3	20	20
North Macedonia	8	1	2	5	8	15	-7	37.5	12.5
Malta	10	2	3	5	9	16	-7	50	20
Moldova	12	3	5	4	8	10	-2	63.64	25
Mongolia	1	1	0	0	1	0	+1	100	100
Montenegro	3	0	1	2	0	4	-4	33.33	0
Northern Ireland	6	1	2	3	3	8	-5	50	16.67
Norway	7	1	2	4	1	9	-8	42.86	14.29
Oman (Note: Includes matches in U-23 Islamic Solidarity Matches)	2	1	0	2	3	4	-1	0	0
Philippines	1	1	0	0	1	0	+1	100	100
Poland	6	0	1	5	1	20	-19	16.67	0
Portugal	8	0	1	7	1	22	-21	12.5	0
Qatar	4	1	2	1	6	6	0	75	25
Republic of Ireland	2	0	1	1	1	4	-3	50	0
Romania	4	0	0	4	1	12	-11	0	0
Russia	5	0	2	3	2	9	-7	40	0
Saint Lucia	1	1	0	0	6	1	+5	100	100
Slovenia	1	0	1	0	0	0	0	100	0
San Marino	3	3	0	0	8	2	+6	100	100
Saudi Arabia (Note: Includes matches in Islamic Solidarity Games)	3	1	0	2	2	2	0	33.33	33.33
Serbia (Note: Includes matches against Serbia and Montenegro. Won:1 Draw:1 GF:4 GA:3 GD:+1)	7	1	1	5	8	19	-11	28.57	14.29
Sierra Leone	1	0	1	0	1	1	0	0	0
Singapore	1	0	1	0	2	2	0	100	0
Slovakia	12	2	0	10	8	26	-18	16.66%	16.67
Spain	1	0	0	1	0	6	-6	0	0
Sweden	6	1	0	5	4	18	-14	0	16.67
Switzerland	2	1	0	1	1	5	-4	50	50
Tajikistan	2	3	0	0	6	2	+4	100	100
Trinidad and Tobago	2	0	0	2	0	3	-3	0	0
Turkey	8	1	1	6	3	11	-8	25	12.5
Turkmenistan	2	1	0	1	3	2	+1	50	50
Ukraine	4	0	2	2	2	9	-7	25	0
United Arab Emirates	1	0	1	0	3	3	0	100	0
United States	1	0	0	1	0	2	-2	0	0
Uzbekistan	10	4	4	2	11	10	+1	80	40
Wales	8	0	1	7	2	15	-13	12.5	0

== International goalscorers ==
As of Match played 29 March 2022

All goalscorers from International Matches. Non-International Matches are not included.

12 goals

- Gurban Gurbanov

9 goals

- Vagif Javadov
- Emin Mahmudov

8 goals

- Dimitrij Nazarov
- Ramil Sheydayev

7 goals

- Rauf Aliyev
- Elvin Mammadov
- Branimir Subašić

6 goals

- Zaur Tagizade

5 goals

- Farrukh Ismayilov
- Vidadi Rzayev
- Rashad Sadygov
- Afran Ismayilov
- Nazim Suleymanov
- Rufat Dadashov

4 goals

- Ruslan Abushev
- Samir Aliyev
- Maksim Medvedev
- Fabio Ramim
- Yunis Huseynov
- Vyacheslav Lychkin
- Vugar Nadirov
- Mahir Shukurov

3 goals

- Rasim Abishov
- Rahid Amirguliyev
- Nadir Nabiev
- Emin Quliyev
- Tamkin Khalilzade
- Richard Almeida
- Araz Abdullayev

2 goals

- Samir Alakbarov
- Javid Huseynov
- Ruslan Lukin
- Mahir Emreli
- Vadim Vasilyev
- Mahir Madatov

1 goal

- Emin Agaev
- Andrezinho
- Farid Guliyev
- Tarlan Guliyev
- Ilgar Gurbanov
- Mahmud Qurbanov
- Nizami Hajiyev
- Murad Hüseynov
- Ruslan İdiqov
- Emin Imamaliev
- Mirbaghir Isayev
- Aslan Kerimov
- Khagani Mammadov
- Ramiz Mammadov
- Cihan Özkara
- Anatoli Ponomarev
- Alim Qurbanov
- Ruslan Qurbanov
- Aghabala Ramazanov
- Narvik Sirkhayev
- Jeyhun Sultanov
- Elvin Yunuszade
- Zeynal Zeynalov
- Urfan Abbasov
- Javid Imamverdiyev
- Badavi Huseynov
- Azer Salahli

Own goal

Nugzar Lobzhanidze (25 May 1993 vs Georgia)

Giorgio Chiellini (10 October 2014 vs Italy)

Michele Cevoli (4 September 2017 vs San Marino)

== Non-International matches ==
15 May 1993 Friendly	Azerbaijan	1 – 1	Kazakhstan U21
				Referee: (Iran)

8 June 1993 1993 ECO Cup GS	Azerbaijan	3 – 3	Kazakhstan U21	Tehran, Iran
	Gurbanov 10', 25'; Hüseynov 37'	(Report)	15' Niyazymbetov; 75' (pen.), 86' (pen.) Zheilitbayev	Stadium: Azadi Stadium; Attendance: 2,000; Referee: (Iran)

20 February 1996 Friendly	Cyprus U21	0 – 2	Azerbaijan	Famagusta, Cyprus
		(Report)	19', 73' Kadyrov	Stadium: Antonis Papadopoulos; Referee: (Cyprus)

26 July 2000 San Pelegrino Tourn.	Bulgaria	2 – 1	Azerbaijan	Varna, Bulgaria
	Chomakov 5'; Yovov 21'	(Report)	R. Mamedov 61'	Stadium: Spartak Stadium; Referee: Zhivko Dimitrov (Bulgaria)

20 February 2002 Friendly	Bulgaria League XI	3 – 0	Azerbaijan	Sofia, Bulgaria
	Dimitrov 10'; Janković 22' (pen.); Nikolov 63'	(Report)		Stadium: Slavia Stadium; Attendance: 1,200; Referee: Anton Genov (Bulgaria)

8 August 2002 Friendly	Iran U23	2 – 2	Azerbaijan	Tabriz, Iran
	,	(Report)	Imamaliev 21'; Nabiev 67'	Stadium: Takhti Stadium, Attendance: 10,000; Referee: Khagani Mamedov (Azerbaijan)

29 February 2012 Unofficial friendly	Palestine	2 – 0	Azerbaijan	Dubai, UAE
17:30 AZT (UTC+4)	Nu'man 39'; Abuhabib 79'	Report		Stadium: The Sevens; Attendance: 50; Referee: Mohamed Al Zarouni (UAE)
