= 2020–21 Qarabağ FK season =

Qarabağ
2020–21 season
- President: Tahir Gözal
- Manager: Gurban Gurbanov
- Stadium: Azersun Arena
- Premier League: 2nd
- Azerbaijan Cup: Semi-finals vs Sumgayit
- Champions League: Third qualifying round vs Molde
- Europa League: Group stage
- Top goalscorer: League: Mahir Emreli (18); All: Mahir Emreli (22)
Home colours	Away colours	Third colours

The Qarabağ 2020–21 season was Qarabağ's 28th Azerbaijan Premier League season, of which were defending champions, and will be their thirteenth season under manager Gurban Gurbanov.

== Season overview ==
On 2 July, Qarabağ announced the return of Wilde-Donald Guerrier from Neftçi.

On 10 July, Qarabağ announced the signing of Emil Balayev.

On 19 July, Kevin Medina signed a three-year contract with Qarabağ.

On 26 July, Uroš Matić signed for Qarabağ on a three-year contract from Copenhagen.

On 1 August, Hajiagha Hajili joined Zira on loan for the season.

On 28 August, Qarabağ announced the signing of Patrick Andrade to a two-year contract, with the option of a third, from Cherno More Varna.

On 30 September, Qarabağ's match against Sabail scheduled for 4 October was postponed to allow Azerbaijan additional preparation time for their upcoming UEFA Nations League matches.

On 20 October, UEFA announced that all UEFA matches played by Azerbaijani or Armenian clubs must take place at a neutral venue due to the ongoing 2020 Nagorno-Karabakh conflict. This resulted in Qarabağ's UEFA Europe League home match against Villarreal being moved to the Başakşehir Fatih Terim Stadium in Istanbul.

On 8 December, Qarabağ's final UEFA Europa League group match, against Villarreal, was postponed as Qarabağ did not have enough players due to COVID-19 infections. The match was awarded 3–0 to Villarreal on 18 December.

On 2 January, Musa Gurbanli moved to Zira on loan for the rest of the season.

On 31 January, Wilde-Donald Guerrier left Qarabağ by mutual consent.

== Squad ==
As of match played 19 May 2021

No.	Name	Nationality	Position	Date of birth (age)	Signed from	Signed in	Contract ends	Apps.	Goals
Goalkeepers
1	Shahrudin Mahammadaliyev	(Azerbaijan)	GK	12 June 1994 (aged 26)	Sumgayit	2015		71	0
12	Emil Balayev	(Azerbaijan)	GK	17 April 1994 (aged 27)	Zira	2020		14	0
Defenders
4	Rahil Mammadov	(Azerbaijan)	DF	24 November 1995 (aged 25)	Sabail	2018	2021	51	2
5	Maksim Medvedev	(Azerbaijan)	DF	29 September 1989 (aged 31)	Youth team	2006		465+	15+
21	Rauf Huseynli	(Azerbaijan)	DF	25 January 2000 (aged 21)	Youth team	2019		0	0
30	Abbas Huseynov	(Azerbaijan)	DF	13 June 1995 (aged 25)	Inter Baku	2017		80	1
55	Badavi Huseynov	(Azerbaijan)	DF	11 July 1991 (aged 29)	Anzhi Makhachkala	2012		279	5
81	Kevin Medina	(Colombia)	DF	9 March 1993 (aged 28)	Chaves	2020	2023	33	0
Midfielders
2	Gara Garayev	(Azerbaijan)	MF	12 October 1992 (aged 28)	Youth team	2008	2021	385	4
6	Patrick Andrade	(Cape Verde)	MF	9 February 1993 (aged 28)	Cherno More Varna	2020	2022 (+1)	31	7
8	Uroš Matić	(Serbia)	MF	23 May 1990 (aged 30)	Copenhagen	2020	2023	31	3
10	Abdellah Zoubir	(France)	MF	5 December 1991 (aged 29)	RC Lens	2018		115	24
18	Ismayil Ibrahimli	(Azerbaijan)	MF	13 February 1998 (aged 23)	MOIK Baku	2018		60	5
19	Filip Ozobić	(Croatia)	MF	8 April 1991 (aged 30)	Gabala	2018	2021	79	23
27	Toral Bayramov	(Azerbaijan)	MF	23 February 2001 (aged 20)	Academy	2019		32	2
44	Elvin Jafarguliyev	(Azerbaijan)	MF	26 October 2000 (aged 20)	Youth team	2019		32	0
Forwards
7	Owusu Kwabena	(Ghana)	FW	18 June 1997 (aged 23)	Leganés	2020	2023	44	9
9	Jaime Romero	(Spain)	FW	31 July 1990 (aged 30)	Córdoba	2019	2022	57	12
11	Mahir Emreli	(Azerbaijan)	FW	1 July 1997 (aged 23)	Baku	2015		196	71
Away on loan
22	Musa Gurbanli	(Azerbaijan)	FW	13 April 2002 (aged 19)	Youth team	2019		6	1
99	Ruslan Hajiyev	(Azerbaijan)	MF	20 March 1998 (aged 23)	Youth team	2018		0	0
	Hajiagha Hajili	(Azerbaijan)	MF	30 January 1998 (aged 23)	Gabala	2019	2023	11	0
	Rafael Maharramli	(Azerbaijan)	MF	1 October 1999 (aged 21)	Keşla	2018		0	0
Left during the season
77	Wilde-Donald Guerrier	(Haiti)	MF	31 March 1989 (aged 32)	Neftçi	2020		83	12

=== Out on loan ===
Note: Flags indicate national team as defined under FIFA eligibility rules; some limited exceptions apply. Players may hold more than one non-FIFA nationality.

No.	Pos.	Nation	Player
22	FW	AZE	Musa Gurbanli (at Zira)
99	MF	AZE	Ruslan Hajiyev (at Sabail)

No.	Pos.	Nation	Player
—	MF	AZE	Hajiagha Hajili (at Zira)
—	MF	AZE	Rafael Maharramli (at Keşla)

== Transfers ==
=== In ===
Date	Position	Nationality	Name	From	Fee	Ref.
2 July 2020	MF	(Haiti)	Wilde-Donald Guerrier	Neftçi	Free	
10 July 2020	GK	(Azerbaijan)	Emil Balayev	Zira	Undisclosed	
19 July 2020	DF	(Colombia)	Kevin Medina	Chaves	Undisclosed	
26 July 2020	MF	(Serbia)	Uroš Matić	Copenhagen	Undisclosed	
28 August 2020	MF	(Cape Verde)	Patrick Andrade	Cherno More Varna	Undisclosed	

=== Loans out ===
Date from	Position	Nationality	Name	To	Date to	Ref.
Summer 2020	MF	(Azerbaijan)	Ruslan Hajiyev	Sabail	End of season	
1 August 2020	MF	(Azerbaijan)	Hajiagha Hajili	Zira	End of season	
20 August 2020	MF	(Azerbaijan)	Rafael Maharramli	Keşla	End of season	
2 January 2021	FW	(Azerbaijan)	Musa Gurbanli	Zira	End of season	

=== Released ===
Date	Position	Nationality	Name	Joined	Date	Ref
17 July 2020	MF	(Spain)	Míchel	Marino de Luanco		
31 January 2021	MF	(Haiti)	Wilde-Donald Guerrier	Apollon Limassol	8 February 2021	

== Friendlies ==
18 July 2020	Qarabağ	3 – 1	Keşla	Qabala
AZT (UTC+4)	Ozobić 11' (pen.), 51', 65'		Christovão 6'	Stadium: Gabala City Stadium; Attendance: 0
Note: Match played behind closed doors.

25 July 2020	Qarabağ	1 – 2	Sabah	Qabala
AZT (UTC+4)	Ozobić		Rodríguez; Khalilzade	Stadium: Gabala City Stadium; Attendance: 0
Note: Match played behind closed doors.

31 July 2020	Qarabağ	1 – 0	Neftçi	Qabala
AZT (UTC+4)	B.Huseynov 50'			Stadium: Gabala City Stadium; Attendance: 0
Note: Match played behind closed doors.

5 August 2020	Qarabağ	4 – 0	Keşla	Qabala
AZT (UTC+4)	Emreli; Kwabena; Medina			Stadium: Gabala City Stadium; Attendance: 0
Note: Match played behind closed doors.

11 August 2020	Qarabağ	2 – 0	Sabah	Baku
AZT (UTC+4)	Matić 31' (pen.); Emreli 85'	Report		Stadium: Azersun Arena; Attendance: 0
Note: Match played behind closed doors.

14 January 2021	Qarabağ	3 – 3	Keşla	Baku
AZT (UTC+4)	Ozobić 51'; Emreli 61'; Zoubir 67'	Report	Goal	Stadium: Tofiq Bahramov Republican Stadium; Attendance: 0
Note: Match played behind closed doors.

== Competitions ==
=== Premier League ===
==== Results summary ====
Overall								Home						Away					
Pld	W	D	L	GF	GA	GD	Pts	W	D	L	GF	GA	GD	W	D	L	GF	GA	GD
28	16	9	3	64	18	+46	57	11	1	2	39	10	+29	5	8	1	25	8	+17

Last updated: 19 May 2021.
Source: See Results

==== Results by round ====
Round	1	2	3	4	5	6	7	8	9	10	11	12	13	14	15	16	17	18	19	20	21	22	23	24	25	26	27	28
Ground	H	A	A	A	H	A	H	A	H	A	A	H	A	H	H	A	H	H	A	H	A	H	A	A	H	A	H	A
Result	W	D	L	D	W	D	W	W	W	D	D	W	W	W	L	D	W	W	W	W	D	W	D	W	D	W	W	L
Position	1	1	5	5	5	4	3	2	1	1	2	2	2	1	2	2	2	2	2	2	1	1	1	1	1	1	1	2

Updated to match(es) played on 19 May 2021. Source: See Results
A = Away; H = Home; W = Win; D = Draw; L = Loss

==== Results ====
22 August 2020 1	Qarabağ	2 – 0	Sabah	Baku
20:00 AZT (UTC+4)	Emreli 45', 69'; Ibrahimli (yellow card) 67'	Report	Marina (yellow card) 75'; Rodríguez (yellow card) 77'; Khalilzade (yellow card) 86'	Stadium: Azersun Arena; Attendance: 0 Referee: Rahim Hasanov
Note: Match played behind closed doors due to the COVID-19 pandemic.

11 September 2020 2	Keşla	0 – 0	Qarabağ	Baku
21:00 AZT (UTC+4)	Qirtimov (yellow card) 83'	Report	Guerrier (yellow card) 10'; Owusu (yellow card) 45+1'; Jafarguliyev (yellow card) 53'	Stadium: ASK Arena; Attendance: 0 Referee: Sabuhi Bayramov
Note: Match played behind closed doors due to the COVID-19 pandemic.

20 September 2020 3	Qarabağ	1 – 2	Neftçi	Baku
20:15 AZT (UTC+4)	Owusu 10'; Medvedev (yellow card) 59'; Andrade (yellow card) 78'	Report	Stanković 12'; M.Kane (yellow card) 41'; Alaskarov 68'; Mbodj (yellow card) 76'	Stadium: Azersun Arena; Attendance: 0 Referee: Aliyar Agayev
Note: Match played behind closed doors due to the COVID-19 pandemic.

25 September 2020 4	Sumgayit	2 – 2	Qarabağ	Sumqayit
19:00 AZT (UTC+4)	Mustafayev (yellow card) 42'; Ghorbani 52' (yellow card) 90+5'; Khodzhaniyazov 54'	Report	Owusu 58'; Ibrahimli (yellow card) 65'; Ozobić 90+5'	Stadium: Kapital Bank Arena; Attendance: 0 Referee: Kamal Umudlu
Note: Match played behind closed doors due to the COVID-19 pandemic.

17 October 2020 6	Qarabağ	3 – 0	Gabala	Baku
16:00 AZT (UTC+4)	Medina (yellow card) 21'; Guerrier 43'; Andrade 89' (pen.); Bayramov 90+1'	Report	Adeniyi (yellow card) 21'; Ingilabli (yellow card) 70'; Gigauri (yellow card) 87'	Stadium: Azersun Arena; Attendance: 0 Referee: Raad Ahmadov
Note: Match played behind closed doors due to the COVID-19 pandemic.

25 October 2020 7	Zira	0 – 0	Qarabağ	Zirə
16:00 AZT (UTC+4)	Volkovi (yellow card) 45+3'; Aliyev (yellow card) 80'	Report	Mammadov (yellow card) 35' (yellow-red card) 68'; Jafarguliyev (yellow card) 89'	Stadium: Zira Olympic Sport Complex Stadium; Attendance: 0 Referee: Ravan Hamzazada
Note: Match played behind closed doors due to the COVID-19 pandemic.

1 November 2020 8	Qarabağ	6 – 1	Keşla	Baku
16:00 AZT (UTC+4)	Ozobić 4', 60'; B.Huseynov 12'; Owusu 38'; Emreli 65', 89'	Report	Isgandarli 25'; Kamara (yellow card) 41'; Qirtimov (yellow card) 85'; Azadov (yellow card) 90+1'	Stadium: Azersun Arena; Attendance: 0 Referee: Aliyar Agayev
Note: Match played behind closed doors due to the COVID-19 pandemic.

8 November 2020 9	Neftchi	0 – 6	Qarabağ	Baku
15:00 AZT (UTC+4)	Çelik (yellow card) 29'; Bougrine (yellow card) 66'	Report	Ozobić 21', 30' (pen.), 52'; Emreli 39'; Zoubir 50'; Gurbanli 75'	Stadium: Eighth Kilometer District Stadium; Attendance: 0 Referee: Rahim Hasanov
Note: Match played behind closed doors due to the COVID-19 pandemic.

21 November 2020 10	Qarabağ	6 – 1	Sumgayit	Baku
16:00 AZT (UTC+4)	Guerrier 28', 45+1'; Zoubir 34', 89'; Bayramov 54'; Emreli 75'	Report	Najafov (yellow card) 33'; Khodzhaniyazov (yellow card) 35'; Mustafayev (yellow card) 40'; Abdullazade (yellow card) 64'; Mutallimov 87'	Stadium: Azersun Arena; Attendance: 0 Referee: Ingilab Mammadov
Note: Match played behind closed doors due to the COVID-19 pandemic.

29 November 2020 11	Sabail	1 – 1	Qarabağ	Baku
16:00 AZT (UTC+4)	Yunanov 57' (pen.)	Report	Jafarguliyev (yellow card) 56'; Guerrier 64'	Stadium: Bayil Arena; Attendance: 0 Referee: Elcin Masiyev
Note: Match played behind closed doors due to the COVID-19 pandemic.

20 December 2020 12	Gabala	1 – 1	Qarabağ	Qabala
15:00 AZT (UTC+4)	Muradov (yellow card) 68' (yellow-red card) 69'; Utzig 83'; Nazirov (yellow card) 90+3'	Report	Emreli (yellow card) 8'; Owusu (yellow card) 45+2'; Ozobić 51'; Jafarguliyev (yellow card) 90+3'	Stadium: Gabala City Stadium; Attendance: 0 Referee: Rauf Jabbarov
Note: Match originally scheduled for 6 December, but postponed. Match played behind closed doors due to the COVID-19 pandemic.

24 December 2020 13	Qarabağ	3 – 2	Zira	Baku
16:00 AZT (UTC+4)	Zoubir (yellow card) 43'; Emreli 58'; Ibrahimli (yellow card) 80'; Owusu 83', 89'; Mahammadaliyev (yellow card) 90+2'; Medina (red card) 90+2'	Report	Ramazanov 2' (yellow card) 60'; Đorđević 47' (yellow card) 47'; Chantakias (yellow card) 70' (yellow-red card) 75'	Stadium: Azersun Arena; Attendance: 0 Referee: Rahim Hasanov
Note: Match played behind closed doors due to the COVID-19 pandemic.

21 January 2021 14	Sabah	1 – 2	Qarabağ	Masazır
18:00 AZT (UTC+4)	Isayev (yellow card) 43'; Marina (yellow card) 55'; Koubemba 60'	Report	Mammadov 8'; Emreli 72'	Stadium: Bank Respublika Arena; Attendance: 0 Referee: Vugar Hasanli
Note: Match played behind closed doors due to the COVID-19 pandemic.

28 January 2021 5	Qarabağ	4 – 0	Sabail	Baku
16:00 AZT (UTC+4)	Owusu 18'; Emreli 25', 90+2'; Andrade 85'	Report	Naghiyev (yellow card) 80'	Stadium: Azersun Arena; Attendance: 0 Referee: Elcin Masiyev
Note: Match originally scheduled for 4 October, but postponed on 30 September.

13 February 2021 15	Qarabağ	1 – 2	Neftçi	Baku
18:30 AZT (UTC+4)	Emreli 57'; Medina (red card) 73'; Bayramov (yellow card) 73'; Romero (yellow card) 75'	Report	Buludov (red card) 22'; Alaskarov 28', 75' (pen.); Stanković (yellow card) 36' (yellow-red card) 90+3'; Krivotsyuk (yellow card) 38'; M.Kane (yellow card) 41' (yellow-red card) 73'; Mahmudov (yellow card) 60'	Stadium: Azersun Arena; Attendance: 0 Referee: Elcin Masiyev
Note: Match originally scheduled for 4 October, but postponed on 30 September.

19 February 2021 16	Sumgayit	0 – 0	Qarabağ	Sumqayit
18:00 AZT (UTC+4)	Turabov (yellow card) 84'; Jannatov (yellow card) 90+6'	Report	Emreli (yellow card) 44'	Stadium: Kapital Bank Arena; Attendance: 0 Referee: Raad Ahmadov
Note: Match played behind closed doors due to the COVID-19 pandemic.

25 February 2021 17	Qarabağ	1 – 0	Sabail	Baku
18:30 AZT (UTC+4)	Romero 72'; Garayev (yellow card) 82'	Report	U.Abbasov (yellow card) 88'	Stadium: Azersun Arena; Attendance: 0 Referee: Rauf Jabbarov
Note: Match played behind closed doors due to the COVID-19 pandemic.

2 March 2021 18	Qarabağ	3 – 0	Gabala	Baku
18:15 AZT (UTC+4)	Ozobić 22', 34' (pen.); Emreli 38'	Report	Nabiyev (yellow card) 14'; Nazirov (yellow card) 33'; Gigauri (yellow card) 90+1'	Stadium: Azersun Arena; Attendance: 0 Referee: Kamal Umudlu
Note: Match played behind closed doors due to the COVID-19 pandemic.

9 March 2021 19	Zira	0 – 2	Qarabağ	Zirə
17:15 AZT (UTC+4)	Jamalov (yellow card) 55'; Clésio (yellow card) 73'	Report	Romero 3'; Andrade 32'; Jafarguliyev (yellow card) 67'	Stadium: Zira Olympic Sport Complex Stadium; Attendance: 0 Referee: Elcin Masiyev
Note: Match played behind closed doors due to the COVID-19 pandemic.

13 March 2021 20	Qarabağ	2 – 0	Sabah	Baku
17:00 AZT (UTC+4)	Ozobić 42'; Emreli 73'	Report	Ochihava (yellow card) 17'	Stadium: Azersun Arena; Attendance: 0 Referee: Orkhan Mammadov
Note: Match played behind closed doors due to the COVID-19 pandemic.

4 April 2021 21	Keşla	1 – 1	Qarabağ	Baku
18:30 AZT (UTC+4)	Hajiyev 7'; Qirtimov (yellow card) 46'; Abang (yellow card) 62'; Sílvio (yellow card) 70'	Report	Medina (yellow card) 34'; Owusu (yellow card) 69'; Andrade 90+2' (pen.)	Stadium: ASK Arena; Attendance: 0 Referee: Ravan Hamzazada
Note: Match played behind closed doors due to the COVID-19 pandemic.

11 April 2021 22	Qarabağ	4 – 1	Sumgayit	Baku
19:15 AZT (UTC+4)	Zoubir 45+1', 71'; Khodzhaniyazov 47' (o.g.); Jafarguliyev (yellow card) 74'; Ozobić 79'	Report	Ghorbani 60'; Mustafayev (yellow card) 66'; Sharifi (yellow card) 82'	Stadium: Azersun Arena; Attendance: 0 Referee: Rauf Jabbarov
Note: Match played behind closed doors due to the COVID-19 pandemic.

17 April 2021 23	Sabail	1 – 1	Qarabağ	Baku
18:00 AZT (UTC+4)	Yunanov (yellow card) 27' (goal) 38' (pen.)	Report	Matić 42'; Andrade (yellow card) 45+2'; Jafarguliyev (yellow card) 90+3'	Stadium: Bayil Arena; Attendance: 0 Referee: Aliyar Agayev
Note: Match played behind closed doors due to the COVID-19 pandemic.

25 April 2021 24	Gabala	0 – 5	Qarabağ	Qabala
17:00 AZT (UTC+4)	Ahmadov (yellow card) 52'	Report	Ibrahimli (yellow card) 33'; Romero 64'; Garayev 68'; Emreli 88', 89', 90'	Stadium: Gabala City Stadium; Attendance: 0 Referee: Elcin Masiyev
Note: Match played behind closed doors due to the COVID-19 pandemic.

4 May 2021 25	Qarabağ	1 – 1	Zira	Baku
18:00 AZT (UTC+4)	Bayramov (yellow card) 12'; Zoubir 18'; Medina (yellow card) 82'	Report	Melivilo 16'	Stadium: Azersun Arena; Attendance: 0 Referee: Raad Ahmadov
Note: Match played behind closed doors due to the COVID-19 pandemic.

9 May 2021 26	Sabah	0 – 4	Qarabağ	Masazır
20:15 AZT (UTC+4)	Ivanović (yellow card) 90'	Report	Zoubir 27'; Emreli 32'; Romero 40'; Medvedev 45+2' (pen.); Medina (yellow card) 60'	Stadium: Bank Respublika Arena; Attendance: 0 Referee: Rauf Jabbarov
Note: Match played behind closed doors due to the COVID-19 pandemic.

14 May 2021 27	Qarabağ	2 – 0	Keşla	Baku
19:00 AZT (UTC+4)	Emreli 47'; Kwabena 74'	Report	Aliyev (yellow card) 67'	Stadium: Azersun Arena; Attendance: 0 Referee: Kamal Umudlu
Note: Match played behind closed doors due to the COVID-19 pandemic.

19 May 2021 28	Neftçi	1 – 0	Qarabağ	Baku
20:30 AZT (UTC+4)	Krivotsyuk (yellow card) 84'; Ahmedov 90'; Mammadov (yellow card) 90+4'	Report	Medvedev (yellow card) 8'; Kwabena (yellow card) 90+3'; Jafarguliyev (yellow card) 90+4'; Bayramov (yellow card) 90+6'	Stadium: Dalga Arena; Attendance: 0 Referee: Elcin Masiyev
Note: Match played behind closed doors due to the COVID-19 pandemic.

==== League table ====
Pos	Team	Pld	W	D	L	GF	GA	GD	Pts	Qualification
1	Neftçi Baku (C)	28	18	5	5	47	25	+22	59	Qualification for the Champions League first qualifying round
2	Qarabağ	28	16	9	3	64	18	+46	57	Qualification to Europa Conference League second qualifying round
3	Sumgayit	28	10	9	9	30	31	−1	39	Qualification to Europa Conference League second qualifying round
4	Zira	28	8	14	6	28	28	0	38	
5	Sabah	28	7	8	13	28	38	−10	29	

Source: Soccerway
Rules for classification: 1) Points; 2) Head-to-head points; 3) Head-to-head goal difference; 4) Head-to-head goals scored; 5) Head-to-head away goals scored (only if two teams); 6) Goal difference; 7) Goals scored.
(C) Champions

=== Azerbaijan Cup ===
1 February 2021 Quarterfinal 1st leg	Qarabağ	3 – 1	Gabala	Baku
18:00 AZT (UTC+4)	Matić (penalty missed) 33'; Kwabena 55'; Emreli 72', 75'; Bayramov (yellow card) 78'	Report	Vukčević (yellow card) 31'; Goxha (yellow card) 33'; Adeniyi 88'	Stadium: Tofiq Bahramov Republican Stadium; Attendance: 0 Referee: Ravan Hamzazada
Note: Match played behind closed doors due to the COVID-19 pandemic in Azerbaijan.

6 February 2021 Quarterfinal 2nd leg	Gabala	0 – 3 (1 – 6 agg.)	Qarabağ	Qabala
15:00 AZT (UTC+4)	Gigauri (yellow card) 68'; Mammadov (yellow card) 85'	Report	Medvedev 6'; B.Huseynov (yellow card) 30'; A.Huseynov (yellow card) 32'; Andrade 45+4' (pen.), 48'	Stadium: Gabala City Stadium; Attendance: 0 Referee: Aliyar Agayev
Note: Match played behind closed doors due to the COVID-19 pandemic in Azerbaijan.

21 April 2021 Semifinal 1st leg	Sumgayit	0 – 0	Qarabağ	Sumqayit
20:30 AZT (UTC+4)		Report	Ibrahimli (yellow card) 45'	Stadium: Kapital Bank Arena; Attendance: 0 Referee: Raad Ahmadov
Note: Match played behind closed doors due to the COVID-19 pandemic in Azerbaijan.

29 April 2021 Semifinal 2nd leg	Qarabağ	0 – 0 (0 – 0 agg.) (4 – 5 p)	Sumgayit	Baku
17:00 AZT (UTC+4)	B.Huseynov (yellow card) 88'; Mahammadaliyev (yellow card) 115'	Report	Haghverdi (yellow card) 60'	Stadium: Tofiq Bahramov Republican Stadium; Attendance: 0 Referee: Aliyar Agayev
	Penalties
	Medvedev (penalty scored); Bayramov (penalty scored); Garayev (penalty scored); Romero (penalty scored); Andrade (penalty missed); Medina (penalty missed)		Khodzhaniyazov (penalty scored); Mammadov (penalty missed); Hüseynov (penalty scored); Najafov (penalty scored); Haghverdi (penalty scored); Mustafayev (penalty scored)
Note: Match played behind closed doors due to the COVID-19 pandemic in Azerbaijan.

=== UEFA Champions League ===
==== Qualifying rounds ====
18 August 2020 First qualifying round	Qarabağ (Azerbaijan)	4 – 0	(North Macedonia) Sileks	Baku, Azerbaijan
20:00 AZT (UTC+4)	Romero 11'; Guerrier 40', 51'; Emreli 80'	Report	D.Karcheski (yellow card) 41'	Stadium: Tofiq Bahramov Republican Stadium; Attendance: 0 Referee: Yaroslav Kozyk (Ukraine)
Note: Match played at the Tofiq Bahramov Republican Stadium, Baku, instead of Qarabağ's regular stadium Azersun Arena, which did not meet UEFA requirements. Match played behind closed doors due to the COVID-19 pandemic in Europe.

26 August 2020 Second qualifying round	Qarabağ (Azerbaijan)	2 – 1	(Moldova) Sheriff Tiraspol	Baku, Azerbaijan
20:00 AZT (UTC+4)	Matić 22' (pen.); Emreli 63'; Ibrahimli (yellow card) 73'	Report	Obilor (yellow card) 17'; Abang (red card) 37'; Castañeda 78'	Stadium: Tofiq Bahramov Republican Stadium; Attendance: 0 Referee: Furkat Atazhanov (Kazakhstan)
Note: Match played at the Tofiq Bahramov Republican Stadium, Baku, instead of Qarabağ's regular stadium Azersun Arena, which did not meet UEFA requirements. Match played behind closed doors.

16 September 2020 Third qualifying round	Qarabağ (Azerbaijan)	0 – 0 (a.e.t.) (5–6 p)	(Norway) Molde	Larnaca, Cyprus
21:00 AZT (UTC+4)	Medina (yellow card) 50'; Guerrier (yellow card) 67'; Andrade (yellow card) 86'	Report	Hussain (yellow card) 83' (penalty missed) 102'; Hestad (yellow card) 89'	Stadium: AEK Arena – Georgios Karapatakis; Attendance: 0 Referee: Srđan Jovanović (Serbia)
	Penalties
	Matić (penalty scored); Medvedev (penalty scored); Andrade (penalty scored); Medina (penalty scored); Mahammadaliyev (penalty scored); Huseynov (penalty missed)		(penalty scored) Omoijuanfo; (penalty scored) Aursnes; (penalty scored) Hestad; (penalty scored) Christensen; (penalty scored) Ellingsen; (penalty scored) Haugen
Note: Match played at the AEK Arena – Georgios Karapatakis in Larnaca, Cyprus, instead of Qarabağ's regular stadium Azersun Arena, Baku, due to travel restrictions related to the COVID-19 pandemic between Azerbaijan and Norway. Match played behind closed doors.

=== UEFA Europa League ===
==== Qualifying rounds ====
1 October 2020 Playoff Round	Legia Warsaw (Poland)	0 – 3	(Azerbaijan) Qarabağ	Warsaw, Poland
22:00 AZT (UTC+4)	Slisz (yellow card) 45+1'; Lewczuk (yellow card) 51'	Report	Andrade 50'; Zoubir 62' (yellow card) 63'; Ozobić 70'	Stadium: Polish Army Stadium; Attendance: 0 Referee: Tobias Stieler (Germany)
Note: Match played behind closed doors due to the COVID-19 pandemic in Europe.

==== Group stage ====
Pos	Team	Pld	W	D	L	GF	GA	GD	Pts	Qualification
1	(Spain) Villarreal	6	5	1	0	17	5	+12	16	Advance to knockout phase
2	(Israel) Maccabi Tel Aviv	6	3	2	1	6	7	−1	11	Advance to knockout phase
3	(Turkey) Sivasspor	6	2	0	4	9	11	−2	6	
4	(Azerbaijan) Qarabağ	6	0	1	5	4	13	−9	1	

Source: UEFA
Rules for classification: Group stage tiebreakers

22 October 2020 1	Maccabi Tel Aviv (Israel)	1 – 0	(Azerbaijan) Qarabağ	Tel Aviv, Israel
23:00 AZT (UTC+4)	Cohen 10' (yellow card) 45+2'; Saborit (yellow card) 28'; Guerrero (yellow card) 73'; Rikan (yellow card) 89'	Report	Ozobić (yellow card) 27'; Guerrier (yellow card) 30'; Andrade (yellow card) 64'	Stadium: Bloomfield Stadium; Attendance: 0 Referee: John Beaton (Scotland)
Note: Match played behind closed doors.

29 October 2020 2	Qarabağ (Azerbaijan)	1 – 3	(Spain) Villarreal	Istanbul, Turkey
21:55 AZT (UTC+4)	Romero (yellow card) 2'; Ozobić (yellow card) 12'; Andrade (yellow card) 39'; Kwabena 78'; A.Huseynov (yellow card) 90+4'	Report	Iborra (yellow card) 25'; Pino 80'; Alcácer 85', 90+6'	Stadium: Başakşehir Fatih Terim Stadium; Attendance: 0 Referee: Pavel Orel (Czech Republic)
Note: Match played at the Başakşehir Fatih Terim Stadium in Istanbul, instead of Qarabağ's regular home stadium, Tofiq Bahramov Republican Stadium, in Baku after UEFA temporarily suspend all UEFA matches taking place in Armenia and Azerbaijan until further notice due to the 2020 Nagorno-Karabakh conflict. Match played behind closed doors.

5 November 2020 3	Sivasspor (Turkey)	2 – 0	(Azerbaijan) Qarabağ	Sivas, Turkey
21:55 AZT (UTC+4)	Osmanpaşa 11'; Fajr (yellow card) 63'; Kayode 88'	Report	Ozobić (yellow card) 53'; Kwabena (yellow card) 90+1'	Stadium: New Sivas 4 Eylül Stadium; Attendance: 296; Referee: Sandro Schärer (Switzerland)

26 November 2020 4	Qarabağ (Azerbaijan)	2 – 3	(Turkey) Sivasspor	Istanbul, Turkey
21:55 AZT (UTC+4)	Zoubir 8'; Garayev (yellow card) 40'; Matić 51'; Kwabena (yellow card) 58'	Report	Samassa (yellow card) 9'; Koné 40' (pen.), 79'; Kayode 58'; Goiano (yellow card) 62'; Öztekin (yellow card) 90+2'	Stadium: Başakşehir Fatih Terim Stadium; Attendance: 0 Referee: Jakob Kehlet (Denmark)
Note: Match played at the Başakşehir Fatih Terim Stadium in Istanbul, instead of Qarabağ's regular home stadium, Tofiq Bahramov Republican Stadium, in Baku after UEFA temporarily suspend all UEFA matches taking place in Armenia and Azerbaijan until further notice due to the 2020 Nagorno-Karabakh conflict. Match played behind closed doors.

3 December 2020 5	Qarabağ (Azerbaijan)	1 – 1	(Israel) Maccabi Tel Aviv	Istanbul, Turkey
21:55 AZT (UTC+4)	Guerrier (yellow card) 21'; Romero 37'; Matić (yellow card) 40'	Report	Cohen 22' (pen.); Hernández (yellow card) 85'	Stadium: Başakşehir Fatih Terim Stadium; Attendance: 0 Referee: Rob Hennessy (Ireland)
Note: Match played at the Başakşehir Fatih Terim Stadium in Istanbul, instead of Qarabağ's regular home stadium, Tofiq Bahramov Republican Stadium, in Baku after UEFA temporarily suspend all UEFA matches taking place in Armenia and Azerbaijan until further notice due to the 2020 Nagorno-Karabakh conflict. Match played behind closed doors.

11 December 2020 6	Villarreal (Spain)	3 – 0	(Azerbaijan) Qarabağ	Villarreal, Spain
00:00 AZT (UTC+4)		Report		Stadium: Estadio de la Cerámica; Attendance: 0
Note: Match postponed on 8 December, and awarded as a 3-0 technical victory to Villarreal on 18 December.

== Squad statistics ==
As of Match played 19 May 2021

=== Appearances and goals ===
No.	Pos	Nat	Player	Total		Premier League		Azerbaijan Cup		Champions League		Europa League	
No.	Pos	Nat	Player	Apps	Goals	Apps	Goals	Apps	Goals	Apps	Goals	Apps	Goals
1	GK	(Azerbaijan) AZE	Shahrudin Mahammadaliyev	29	0	18	0	2	0	3	0	6	0
2	MF	(Azerbaijan) AZE	Gara Garayev	37	1	21+4	1	4	0	2	0	6	0
4	DF	(Azerbaijan) AZE	Rahil Mammadov	15	1	8+2	1	1+1	0	0	0	1+2	0
5	DF	(Azerbaijan) AZE	Maksim Medvedev	33	2	20+3	1	3+1	1	3	0	3	0
6	MF	(Cape Verde) CPV	Patrick Andrade	31	7	21+2	4	1+2	2	0+1	0	4	1
7	FW	(Ghana) GHA	Owusu Kwabena	39	9	18+8	7	4	1	1+2	0	5+1	1
8	MF	(Serbia) SRB	Uroš Matić	31	3	11+8	1	3	0	3	1	5+1	1
9	FW	(Spain) ESP	Jaime Romero	31	6	13+7	4	2+1	0	2	1	3+3	1
10	MF	(France) FRA	Abdellah Zoubir	39	9	20+6	7	1+3	0	3	0	6	2
11	FW	(Azerbaijan) AZE	Mahir Emreli	31	22	18+4	18	2+1	2	3	2	1+2	0
12	GK	(Azerbaijan) AZE	Emil Balayev	14	0	10+2	0	2	0	0	0	0	0
18	MF	(Azerbaijan) AZE	Ismayil Ibrahimli	37	0	20+5	0	3+1	0	1+2	0	2+3	0
19	MF	(Croatia) CRO	Filip Ozobić	28	12	16+4	11	0	0	3	0	5	1
27	MF	(Azerbaijan) AZE	Toral Bayramov	30	2	10+12	2	4	0	0	0	1+3	0
30	DF	(Azerbaijan) AZE	Abbas Huseynov	28	0	14+4	0	3	0	0+3	0	3+1	0
44	MF	(Azerbaijan) AZE	Elvin Jafarguliyev	32	0	21+1	0	2+1	0	0+2	0	2+3	0
55	DF	(Azerbaijan) AZE	Badavi Huseynov	30	1	21+1	1	3	0	3	0	2	0
81	DF	(Colombia) COL	Kevin Medina	33	0	20	0	4	0	3	0	6	0
Players away on loan:
22	FW	(Azerbaijan) AZE	Musa Gurbanli	6	1	1+4	1	0	0	0	0	0+1	0
Players who left Qarabağ during the season:
77	MF	(Haiti) HAI	Wilde-Donald Guerrier	16	6	7+1	4	0	0	3	2	5	0

=== Goal scorers ===
Place	Position	Nation	Number	Name	Premier League	Azerbaijan Cup	Champions League	Europa League	Total
1	FW	(Azerbaijan)	11	Mahir Emreli	18	2	2	0	22
2	MF	(Croatia)	19	Filip Ozobić	11	0	0	1	12
3	MF	(France)	10	Abdellah Zoubir	7	0	0	2	9
3	FW	(Ghana)	7	Owusu Kwabena	7	1	0	1	9
5	MF	(Cape Verde)	6	Patrick Andrade	4	2	0	1	7
6	MF	(Haiti)	77	Wilde-Donald Guerrier	4	0	2	0	6
6	FW	(Spain)	9	Jaime Romero	4	0	1	1	6
8	MF	(Azerbaijan)	27	Toral Bayramov	2	0	0	0	2
8	DF	(Azerbaijan)	5	Maksim Medvedev	1	1	0	0	2
8	MF	(Serbia)	8	Uroš Matić	0	0	1	1	2
11	DF	(Azerbaijan)	55	Badavi Huseynov	1	0	0	0	1
11	FW	(Azerbaijan)	22	Musa Gurbanli	1	0	0	0	1
11	DF	(Azerbaijan)	4	Rahil Mammadov	1	0	0	0	1
11	MF	(Serbia)	8	Uroš Matić	1	0	0	0	1
11	MF	(Azerbaijan)	2	Gara Garayev	1	0	0	0	1
11				Own goal	1	0	0	0	1
				TOTALS	64	6	6	7	83

=== Clean sheets ===
Place	Position	Nation	Number	Name	Premier League	Azerbaijan Cup	Champions League	Europa League	Total
1	GK	(Azerbaijan)	1	Shahrudin Mahammadaliyev	9	2	2	1	14
2	GK	(Azerbaijan)	12	Emil Balayev	4	1	0	0	5
				TOTALS	12	3	2	1	18

=== Disciplinary record ===
Number	Nation	Position	Name	Premier League		Azerbaijan Cup		Champions League		Europa League		Total	
Number	Nation	Position	Name	Booked	Sent off (straight red)	Booked	Sent off (straight red)	Booked	Sent off (straight red)	Booked	Sent off (straight red)	Booked	Sent off (straight red)
1	(Azerbaijan)	GK	Shahrudin Mahammadaliyev	1	0	1	0	0	0	0	0	2	0
2	(Azerbaijan)	MF	Gara Garayev	1	0	0	0	0	0	1	0	2	0
4	(Azerbaijan)	DF	Rahil Mammadov	2	1	0	0	0	0	0	0	2	1
5	(Azerbaijan)	DF	Maksim Medvedev	2	0	0	0	0	0	0	0	2	0
6	(Cape Verde)	MF	Patrick Andrade	2	0	0	0	1	0	2	0	5	0
7	(Ghana)	FW	Owusu Kwabena	4	0	0	0	0	0	2	0	6	0
8	(Serbia)	MF	Uroš Matić	0	0	0	0	0	0	1	0	1	0
9	(Spain)	FW	Jaime Romero	1	0	0	0	0	0	1	0	2	0
10	(France)	MF	Abdellah Zoubir	1	0	0	0	0	0	1	0	2	0
11	(Azerbaijan)	FW	Mahir Emreli	2	0	0	0	0	0	1	0	3	0
18	(Azerbaijan)	MF	Ismayil Ibrahimli	4	0	1	0	1	0	0	0	6	0
19	(Croatia)	MF	Filip Ozobić	0	0	0	0	0	0	3	0	3	0
27	(Azerbaijan)	MF	Toral Bayramov	3	0	1	0	0	0	0	0	4	0
30	(Azerbaijan)	DF	Abbas Huseynov	0	0	1	0	0	0	1	0	2	0
44	(Azerbaijan)	MF	Elvin Jafarguliyev	8	0	0	0	0	0	0	0	8	0
55	(Azerbaijan)	DF	Badavi Huseynov	0	0	2	0	0	0	0	0	2	0
81	(Colombia)	DF	Kevin Medina	4	2	0	0	1	0	0	0	5	2
Players who left Qarabağ during the season:
77	(Haiti)	MF	Wilde-Donald Guerrier	1	0	0	0	1	0	2	0	4	0
			TOTALS	36	3	6	0	4	0	14	0	57	3
