= Football at the 2017 Islamic Solidarity Games – Men's team squads =

The football tournament at the 2017 Islamic Solidarity Games took place in Azerbaijan from 8 to 21 May 2017. Each participating nation's football association selected 21 players for the tournament.

== Algeria ==
Head coach: Chafik Ameur

No.	Pos.	Player	Date of birth (age)	Club
1	GK	Chamseddine Rahmani (c)	15 September 1990 (aged 26)	(Algerian Football Federation) MO Béjaïa
2	DF	Aymen Attou	8 October 1997 (aged 19)	(Algerian Football Federation) ES Sétif
3	DF	Hamza Mouali	16 January 1998 (aged 19)	(Algerian Football Federation) Paradou AC
4	FW	Maher Azzouz	4 March 1997 (aged 20)	(Algerian Football Federation) CA Batna
5	DF	Abdeldjalil Semmane	21 July 1997 (aged 19)	(Algerian Football Federation) USM Alger
6	DF	Abdelghani Bouzidi	23 January 1997 (aged 20)	(Algerian Football Federation) NA Hussein Dey
7	DF	Naoufel Khacef	27 October 1997 (aged 19)	(Algerian Football Federation) NA Hussein Dey
8	MF	Ahmed Gagaâ	15 January 1994 (aged 23)	(Algerian Football Federation) JS Kabylie
9	DF	Youcef Douar	15 September 1997 (aged 19)	(Algerian Football Federation) Paradou AC
10	DF	Abderrahime Hamra	21 July 1997 (aged 19)	(Algerian Football Federation) USM Alger
11	MF	M'Hamed Merouani	29 March 1997 (aged 20)	(Algerian Football Federation) ASO Chlef
12	MF	Kamel Belarbi	11 April 1997 (aged 20)	(Algerian Football Federation) USM El Harrach
13	FW	Zakaria Naidji	19 January 1995 (aged 22)	(Algerian Football Federation) Paradou AC
14	FW	Ilyes Yaiche	27 October 1997 (aged 19)	(Algerian Football Federation) USM Alger
15	FW	Ibrahim Saidi	4 April 1997 (aged 20)	(Algerian Football Federation) ES Sétif
16	GK	Zakaria Bouhalfaya	11 August 1997 (aged 19)	(Algerian Football Federation) NA Hussein Dey
17	FW	Farid El Melali	13 July 1997 (aged 19)	(Algerian Football Federation) Paradou AC
18	FW	Youcef Bechou	1 March 1997 (aged 20)	(Algerian Football Federation) USM Alger
19	MF	Daïaeddine Goudjil	23 April 1997 (aged 20)	(Algerian Football Federation) O Médéa
20	MF	Raouf Benguit	5 April 1996 (aged 21)	(Algerian Football Federation) USM Alger
21	FW	Tayeb Meziani	27 February 1996 (aged 21)	(Algerian Football Federation) Paradou AC
22	MF	Laid Ouaji	7 April 1998 (aged 19)	(Algerian Football Federation) USM El Harrach
23	GK	Abdelmoumen Sifour	3 March 1998 (aged 19)	(Algerian Football Federation) USM Alger

== Azerbaijan ==
Head coach: Yashar Vahabzade

No.	Pos.	Player	Date of birth (age)	Club
1	GK	Shahrudin Mahammadaliyev	12 June 1994 (aged 22)	(Association of Football Federations of Azerbaijan) Qarabağ
2	DF	Rahil Mammadov	21 November 1995 (aged 21)	(Association of Football Federations of Azerbaijan) Neftchi Baku
3	DF	Azad Karimov	31 October 1994 (aged 22)	(Association of Football Federations of Azerbaijan) Kapaz
4	DF	Adil Naghiyev	11 September 1995 (aged 21)	(Association of Football Federations of Azerbaijan) Zira
5	DF	Sadig Guliyev	9 March 1995 (aged 22)	(Association of Football Federations of Azerbaijan) Zira
6	MF	Rashad Sadiqov	8 October 1983 (aged 33)	(Association of Football Federations of Azerbaijan) Zira
7	MF	Joshgun Diniyev	13 September 1995 (aged 21)	(Association of Football Federations of Azerbaijan) Qarabağ
8	MF	Elshan Abdullayev	5 February 1994 (aged 23)	(Association of Football Federations of Azerbaijan) Qarabağ
9	FW	Aghabala Ramazanov	20 January 1993 (aged 24)	(Association of Football Federations of Azerbaijan) Qarabağ
10	MF	Orkhan Aliyev	21 December 1995 (aged 21)	(Association of Football Federations of Azerbaijan) Zira
11	FW	Mahir Madatov	1 July 1997 (aged 19)	(Association of Football Federations of Azerbaijan) Qarabağ
12	GK	Tarlan Ahmadli	21 November 1994 (aged 22)	(Association of Football Federations of Azerbaijan) Sumgayit
13	FW	Elnur Jafarov	28 March 1997 (aged 20)	(Association of Football Federations of Azerbaijan) Neftchi Baku
14	DF	Yusif Nabiyev	3 September 1997 (aged 19)	(Association of Football Federations of Azerbaijan) Zira
15	DF	Ruslan Abışov (Captain)	10 October 1987 (aged 29)	(Association of Football Federations of Azerbaijan) Neftchi Baku
16	MF	Elvin Jamalov	4 February 1995 (aged 22)	(Association of Football Federations of Azerbaijan) Gabala
17	FW	Mirabdulla Abbasov	27 April 1995 (aged 22)	(Association of Football Federations of Azerbaijan) Neftchi Baku
18	MF	Tellur Mutallimov	8 April 1995 (aged 22)	(Association of Football Federations of Azerbaijan) Gabala
19	DF	Magsad Isayev	7 June 1994 (aged 22)	(Association of Football Federations of Azerbaijan) Neftchi Baku
20	DF	Azer Salahli	11 April 1994 (aged 23)	(Association of Football Federations of Azerbaijan) Sumgayit
21	MF	Vugar Mustafayev	5 August 1994 (aged 22)	(Association of Football Federations of Azerbaijan) Zira
22	GK	Emil Balayev	17 April 1994 (aged 23)	(Association of Football Federations of Azerbaijan) Səbail
23	MF	Fahmin Muradbayli	16 March 1996 (aged 21)	(Association of Football Federations of Azerbaijan) Neftchi Baku

== Cameroon ==
Head coach: Richard Towa

No.	Pos.	Player	Date of birth (age)	Club
1	GK	Junior Dande	22 February 1998 (aged 19)	(Cameroonian Football Federation) APEJES Academy
2	MF	Alim Moundi	3 February 1995 (aged 22)	(Cameroonian Football Federation) Aigle Royal Menoua
3	DF	Macky Bagnack (c)	7 June 1995 (aged 21)	(Royal Spanish Football Federation) Real Zaragoza
4	DF	Etta Bawak	10 July 1994 (aged 22)	(Cameroonian Football Federation) UMS de Loum
5	DF	Joyskim Dawa	9 April 1996 (aged 21)	(French Football Federation) Monaco
6	MF	Pierre Kunde Malong	26 July 1995 (aged 21)	(Royal Spanish Football Federation) Extremadura UD
7	FW	Jahfort Gueyap	11 June 1995 (aged 21)	(Cameroonian Football Federation) Union Douala
8	MF	Eric Tientcheu	12 September 1996 (aged 20)	(Cameroonian Football Federation) Dragon Club
9	FW	Michel Vaillant Mbiobe	3 February 1996 (aged 21)	(Football Association of Serbia) Mladost Lučani
10	FW	Frantz Pangop	18 May 1993 (aged 23)	(Cameroonian Football Federation) Union Douala
11	DF	Andoulo Serge	8 January 1995 (aged 22)	(Cameroonian Football Federation) New Star
12	FW	Samuel Nlend	15 March 1995 (aged 22)	(Cameroonian Football Federation) Union Douala
13	DF	Paul Otia	4 April 1996 (aged 21)	(Cameroonian Football Federation) UMS de Loum
14	MF	Abanda Koa	6 June 1995 (aged 21)	(Cameroonian Football Federation) Colombe du Dja et Lobo
15	DF	Olivier Mbaizo	15 August 1997 (aged 19)	(Cameroonian Football Federation) Union Douala
16	GK	Simon Omossola	5 May 1998 (aged 19)	(Cameroonian Football Federation) Coton Sport
17	MF	Alima Atangana	9 May 1994 (aged 22)	(Cameroonian Football Federation) APEJES Academy
18	MF	Paul Henri Moussinga	25 October 1997 (aged 19)	(French Football Federation) Amiens
19	FW	Yvan Nkolo	30 December 1998 (aged 18)	(Football Federation of Belarus)
20	MF	Ekollo Malolo	20 August 1998 (aged 18)	(Cameroonian Football Federation) Dragon Club
21	DF	Daniel Kamy	8 March 1996 (aged 21)	(Football Association of Montenegro) Dečić Tuzi
22	DF	Jeff Ngongang	15 June 1994 (aged 22)	(Cameroonian Football Federation) Eding Sport
23	DF	Fabril Kaou	24 August 1993 (aged 23)	(Cameroonian Football Federation) Coton Sport

== Saudi Arabia ==
Head coach: Yousef Anbar

No.	Pos.	Player	Date of birth (age)	Club
1	GK	Mohammed Awaji	22 October 1995 (aged 21)	(Saudi Arabian Football Federation) Al-Shabab
2	DF	Omar Al-Sonain	14 March 1995 (aged 22)	(Saudi Arabian Football Federation) Al-Ettifaq
3	DF	Ahmed Sharahili	8 May 1994 (aged 23)	(Saudi Arabian Football Federation) Al-Hilal
4	DF	Abdulmohsen Fallatah	14 June 1994 (aged 22)	(Saudi Arabian Football Federation) Al-Qadsiah
5	DF	Abdullah Al-Fahad	15 June 1994 (aged 22)	(Saudi Arabian Football Federation) Al-Shabab
6	MF	Abdulellah Al-Malki	11 October 1994 (aged 22)	(Saudi Arabian Football Federation) Al-Wehda
7	FW	Abdullah Al-Meqbas	13 January 1996 (aged 21)	(Saudi Arabian Football Federation) Al-Shabab
8	MF	Mohamed Kanno (c)	22 September 1994 (aged 22)	(Saudi Arabian Football Federation) Al-Ettifaq
9	FW	Abdulrahman Al-Ghamdi	1 November 1994 (aged 22)	(Saudi Arabian Football Federation) Al-Ittihad
10	MF	Mohammed Al-Kwikbi	2 December 1994 (aged 22)	(Saudi Arabian Football Federation) Al-Ettifaq
11	MF	Abdulaziz Al-Bishi	11 March 1994 (aged 23)	(Saudi Arabian Football Federation) Al-Shabab
12	DF	Mohammed Al-Baqawi	12 July 1995 (aged 21)	(Saudi Arabian Football Federation) Al-Hilal
13	DF	Hassan Raghfawi	15 September 1995 (aged 21)	(Saudi Arabian Football Federation) Al-Shabab
14	MF	Moataz Tombakti	13 May 1994 (aged 22)	(Saudi Arabian Football Federation) Al-Ittihad
15	MF	Hassan Al-Amri	21 April 1994 (aged 23)	(Saudi Arabian Football Federation) Al-Qadsiah
16	FW	Raed Al-Ghamdi	6 May 1994 (aged 23)	(Saudi Arabian Football Federation) Al-Ahli
17	DF	Fahad Ghazi	1 March 1994 (aged 23)	(Saudi Arabian Football Federation) Al-Hilal
18	MF	Ali Hazazi	18 February 1994 (aged 23)	(Saudi Arabian Football Federation) Al-Qadsiah
19	FW	Hazaa Al-Hazaa*	8 August 1991 (aged 25)	(Saudi Arabian Football Federation) Al-Ettifaq
20	MF	Abdullah Al Salem*	19 December 1992 (aged 24)	(Saudi Arabian Football Federation) Al-Khaleej
21	GK	Habib Al-Watyan	8 August 1996 (aged 20)	(Saudi Arabian Football Federation) Al-Fateh
22	GK	Marwan Al-Haidari	12 April 1996 (aged 21)	(Saudi Arabian Football Federation) Al-Hilal
23	DF	Ali Lajami	24 April 1996 (aged 21)	(Saudi Arabian Football Federation) Al-Khaleej

== Morocco ==
Head coach: Jamal Sellami

No.	Pos.	Player	Date of birth (age)	Club
1	GK	Yassine El Houasli	24 November 1990 (aged 26)	(Royal Moroccan Football Federation) AS FAR
2	DF	Fahd Moufi	5 May 1996 (aged 21)	(French Football Federation) Sedan
3	DF	Saad Ait Khorsa	3 January 1994 (aged 23)	(Royal Moroccan Football Federation) OC Safi
4	DF	Achraf Dari	6 May 1999 (aged 18)	(Royal Moroccan Football Federation) Wydad Casablanca
5	DF	Zakaria Al Ayoud	8 May 1995 (aged 22)	(Royal Moroccan Football Federation) Difaâ Hassani El Jadidi
6	MF	Walid Sabbar	25 February 1996 (aged 21)	(Royal Moroccan Football Federation) Raja Casablanca
7	MF	Mohamed Kamal	24 October 1995 (aged 21)	(Royal Moroccan Football Federation) AS FAR
8	MF	Mohamed El Mourabit	11 September 1998 (aged 18)	
9	FW	Ayman El Hassouni	22 February 1995 (aged 22)	(Royal Moroccan Football Federation) Wydad Casablanca
10	MF	Ahmed Chentouf	5 December 1996 (aged 20)	(Royal Moroccan Football Federation) IR Tanger
11	MF	Houssam Amaanan (c)	12 May 1994 (aged 22)	
12	GK	Achraf Sidki	6 January 1997 (aged 20)	(Royal Moroccan Football Federation) KAC Kénitra
13	MF	Yassine Mahyou	31 July 1996 (aged 20)	(Royal Moroccan Football Federation) RS Berkane
14	DF	Hamza Errahli	5 December 1994 (aged 22)	(Royal Moroccan Football Federation) Chabab Larache
15	DF	Jamal Harkass	24 November 1995 (aged 21)	(Royal Moroccan Football Federation) MC Oujda
16	DF	Yahia Attiyat allah	2 March 1995 (aged 22)	(Royal Moroccan Football Federation) OC Safi
17	MF	Chouaib El Maftoul	1 September 1994 (aged 22)	(Royal Moroccan Football Federation) Difaâ Hassani El Jadidi
18	MF	Anas Soudani	1 July 1995 (aged 21)	(Royal Moroccan Football Federation) MC Oujda
19	FW	Hamza Goudali	15 October 1996 (aged 20)	(Royal Moroccan Football Federation) OC Safi
20	FW	Zouhair El Moutaraji	1 April 1996 (aged 21)	
21	DF	Soufian Yakhlef	12 May 1996 (aged 20)	(Royal Moroccan Football Federation) Moghreb Tétouan
22	GK	Mohamed Chennouf	14 May 1995 (aged 21)	(Royal Moroccan Football Federation) Raja Casablanca
23	MF	Zakaria Benlamachi	25 July 1994 (aged 22)	(Royal Moroccan Football Federation) Jeunesse Sportive Soualem

== Oman ==
Head coach: Hamed Al-Azani

No.	Pos.	Player	Date of birth (age)	Club
1	GK	Ibrahim Al-Mukhaini	20 June 1997 (aged 19)	
2		Hassan Al-Saadi	22 February 1995 (aged 22)	
3		Majid Saleem Al-Mas Al-Saadi	9 May 1996 (aged 20)	
4		Qadhafi Al Mahruqi	5 January 1997 (aged 20)	
5		Juma Al-Habsi	28 January 1996 (aged 21)	
6		Muanis Al Raqadi	21 May 1997 (aged 19)	
7		Ahmed Al-Kaabi	15 September 1996 (aged 20)	
8		Juma Mubarak Ambar Al-Mamari	15 December 1996 (aged 20)	
9		Marwan Awlad Wadi	7 April 1996 (aged 21)	
10		Yusaif Al Mukhaini	20 March 1995 (aged 22)	
11	FW	Muhsen Al Ghassani	27 March 1997 (aged 20)	
12		Ibrahim Al-Sawwafi	22 March 1996 (aged 21)	
13		Issam Obaid	12 November 1996 (aged 20)	
14		Muhannad Al-Shibli	14 August 1995 (aged 21)	
15		Aiman Hikal	28 February 1997 (aged 20)	
16		Ahmed Al-Matroushi	26 May 1997 (aged 19)	
17		Ammar Al Shayadi	12 June 1997 (aged 19)	
18		Aamir Al-Shibli	26 November 1997 (aged 19)	
19		'Abdallah Al-Tamtami	16 April 1998 (aged 19)	
20	MF	Salaah Al-Yahyaei	17 August 1998 (aged 18)	
21		Abdul Aziz Al-Gheilani (c)	14 May 1995 (aged 21)	
22	GK	Bilal Albalushi	29 May 1996 (aged 20)	
23		Abdullah Abdullah	30 October 1997 (aged 19)	

== Palestine ==
Head coach: Ayman Sandouqa

No.	Pos.	Player	Date of birth (age)	Club
1	GK	Ramzi Alfahkouri	19 February 1996 (aged 21)	
2		Mohammed Saleh	18 July 1993 (aged 23)	
3		Dawoud Salah	10 February 1996 (aged 21)	
4		Yazan Iwaiwi	6 June 1994 (aged 22)	
5		Ahmed Zraiq	1 April 1996 (aged 21)	
6		Mohanad Fannoun	18 September 1995 (aged 21)	
7		Namir Agha	13 January 1995 (aged 22)	
8		Mohammed Yamin	19 September 1994 (aged 22)	
9		Mohammed Maraaba	12 March 1994 (aged 23)	
10		Islam Batran	1 October 1994 (aged 22)	
11		Zuhair Alfararja	24 June 1995 (aged 21)	
12		Ahmed Sayedahmed	22 February 1994 (aged 23)	
13		Bahaa Wridat	17 February 1997 (aged 20)	
14		Yousef Alashhab	10 February 1995 (aged 22)	
15		Hazem Abuhammad	22 February 1996 (aged 21)	
16	GK	Ghanim Mahajna (c)	20 April 1991 (aged 26)	
17		Mahmoud Abuwarda	31 May 1995 (aged 21)	
18		Mohammed Obaid	30 September 1998 (aged 18)	
19		Omar Sandouqa	22 June 1996 (aged 20)	
20		Alaa Habbus	6 December 1996 (aged 20)	
21		Oday Dabbagh	3 December 1999 (aged 17)	
22		Naim Abuaker	20 January 1995 (aged 22)	
23		Mohammed Darwish	2 June 1991 (aged 25)	

== Turkey ==
Head coach: Nedim Yigit

No.	Pos.	Player	Date of birth (age)	Club
1	GK	Erhan Erentürk	30 May 1995 (aged 21)	(Turkish Football Federation) Karşıyaka
2	DF	Zeki Çelik	17 February 1997 (aged 20)	(Turkish Football Federation) İstanbulspor
3	DF	Ozkan Tastemur	14 April 1995 (aged 22)	(Turkish Football Federation) Anadolu Selçukspor
4	DF	Bahadır Öztürk	1 October 1995 (aged 21)	(Turkish Football Federation) Kırklarelispor
5	DF	Gökhan Kardeş	15 May 1997 (aged 19)	(Royal Dutch Football Association) PSV Eindhoven
6	MF	Abdullah Balikci	18 February 1997 (aged 20)	(Turkish Football Federation) Hacettepe
7	FW	Melih Okutan	1 July 1996 (aged 20)	(Turkish Football Federation) Üsküdar Anadolu
8	MF	Taylan Antalyalı (c)	8 January 1995 (aged 22)	(Turkish Football Federation) Hacettepe
9	MF	Ahmethan Köse	7 January 1997 (aged 20)	(Turkish Football Federation) Fenerbahçe
10	MF	Muhammed Demirci	3 January 1995 (aged 22)	(Turkish Football Federation) İstanbulspor
11	FW	Onur Eris	24 February 1993 (aged 24)	(Turkish Football Federation) Zonguldak Kömürspor
12	GK	Muhammed Şengezer	5 January 1997 (aged 20)	(Turkish Football Federation) Bursaspor
13	MF	İbrahim Serdar Aydın	19 July 1996 (aged 20)	(Turkish Football Federation) Yeşil Bursa AŞ
14	DF	Hasan Kurucay	31 August 1997 (aged 19)	(Danish Football Association) Næstved BK
15	DF	Hakki Can Aksu	11 June 1996 (aged 20)	(Turkish Football Federation) Fethiyespor
16	DF	Yasir Subaşı	1 January 1996 (aged 21)	(Turkish Football Federation) Üsküdar Anadolu
17	MF	Oğuzhan Kayar	2 April 1995 (aged 22)	(Turkish Football Federation) Aydınspor
18	MF	Alican Ozfesli	1 January 1997 (aged 20)	(Turkish Football Federation) Altınordu
19	MF	Muhammed Enes Durmuş	8 January 1997 (aged 20)	(Turkish Football Federation) Beşiktaş
20	MF	Yunus Emre Yalçın	12 September 1994 (aged 22)	(Turkish Football Federation) İstanbulspor
21	FW	Kerem Caliskan	13 October 1997 (aged 19)	(Turkish Football Federation) Galatasaray
22	FW	Muhammet Beşir	1 January 1997 (aged 20)	(Turkish Football Federation) 1461 Trabzon
23	GK	Birkan Tetik	19 October 1995 (aged 21)	(Turkish Football Federation) Fatih Karagümrük
