= Alim Moundi =

Cameroonian footballer

Personal information
- Full name: Alim Mohaze Moundi
- Date of birth: 3 February 1995 (age 31)
- Place of birth: Baïgom, Cameroon
- Height: 1.76 m (5 ft 9 in)
- Position: Midfielder

Team information
- Current team: Peimari United

Senior career*
Years	Team	Apps	(Gls)
2018	Aigle Royal Menoua		
2018	Ilves	6	(0)
2019–2021	TPS	64	(4)
2022–	Peimari United	56	(10)
- * Club domestic league appearances and goals as of 19:28, 11 January 2023 (UTC)

Alim Mohaze Moundi (born 3 February 1995) is a Cameroonian professional footballer who plays for Finnish club Peimari United, as a midfielder.

== Career ==
Moundi spent his early career with Aigle Royal Menoua. After playing with FC Ilves, on 5 December 2018 Moundi signed with TPS from the 2019 season. He spent the 2022 season with Peimari United.
