= Emil Balayev =

Azerbaijani footballer (born 1994)

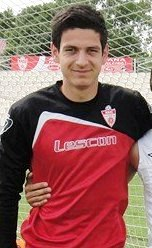
- Balayev with Araz-Naxçıvan in 2013

Personal information
- Full name: Emil Nazim ogly Balayev
- Date of birth: 17 April 1994 (age 32)
- Place of birth: Volgograd, Russia
- Height: 1.90 m (6 ft 3 in)
- Position: Goalkeeper

Team information
- Current team: Neftçi
- Number: 1

Youth career
- Neftçi

Senior career*
| Years | Team | Apps | (Gls) |
| 2011–2014 | Neftçi | 11 | (0) |
| 2011–2012 | → Sumgayit (loan) | 0 | (0) |
| 2013–2014 | → Araz-Naxçıvan (loan) | 8 | (0) |
| 2015–2016 | Eintracht Frankfurt | 0 | (0) |
| 2016–2017 | Qarabağ | 0 | (0) |
| 2017–2018 | Sabail | 38 | (0) |
| 2019 | Tobol | 31 | (0) |
| 2020 | Zira | 1 | (0) |
| 2020–2022 | Qarabağ | 17 | (0) |
| 2022 | Turan | 1 | (0) |
| 2022–2023 | Sabail | 33 | (0) |
| 2023– | Neftçi | 11 | (0) |

International career^{‡}
| 2019– | Azerbaijan | 21 | (0) |
Medal record
Men's football
Representing Azerbaijan
Islamic Solidarity Games
| Winner | 2017 Azerbaijan |
- * Club domestic league appearances and goals as of 22 June 2026 ‡ National team caps and goals as of 15 November 2026

Emil Nazim ogly Balayev (Azerbaijani: Emil Nazim oğlu Balayev; Russian: Эмиль Назим оглы Балаев; born 17 April 1994) is a professional footballer who plays as a goalkeeper for Neftçi. Born in Russia, he plays for the Azerbaijan national team. He was selected as the footballer of the year in Azerbaijan in 2019.

== Club career ==
As a youth player Balayev was a member of Neftçi youth system, before he was promoted to the first team in 2011. Balayev made his debut for Neftchi in an Azerbaijan Premier League match against Sumgayit in September 2012. In 2013 Balayev was sent on a season loan to Araz-Naxçıvan.

Balayev moved from Neftçi to Bundesliga club Eintracht Frankfurt in January 2014. However, he failed to make an appearance for the club and was released in June 2016.

In January 2019, Balayev moved from Sabail to Kazakhstani club Tobol. He made his professional debut for Tobol in the Kazakhstan Premier League on 9 March 2019, starting in the home match against Irtysh Pavlodar, which finished as a 3–0 win. On 31 January 2020, Balayev left Tobol by mutual consent.

On 3 March 2020, Zira announced the signing of Balayev on a contract until the end of the 2019–20 season.

On 10 July 2020, Balayev signed a contract with Qarabağ FK. On 3 March 2022, Balayev left Qarabağ.

On 4 March 2022, Kazakhstan Premier League club Turan announced the signing of Balayev. Balayev left Turan in June 2022.

On 28 June 2023, Neftçi announced the return of Balayev on a two-year contract. On 26 June 2025, Balayev signed a new one-year contract with Neftçi.

== International career ==
Balayev was called up to the Azerbaijan national team for the first time in September 2013 for a 2014 FIFA World Cup qualification match against Israel. He made his International debut in a Euro 2020 qualifier against Croatia on 9 September 2019.

Balayev was included in the squad of hosts Azerbaijan's under-23 team at the 2017 Islamic Solidarity Games in Baku, in which Azerbaijan went on to win the gold medal.

Balayev made his Azerbaijan debut in 2019 against Croatia in UEFA Euro 2020 qualifying.

== Career statistics ==
=== Club ===
As of match played 18 May 2025

Appearances and goals by club, season and competition
| Club | Season | League | | | National cup | | Europe | | Other | | Total | |
| Club | Season | Division | Apps | Goals | Apps | Goals | Apps | Goals | Apps | Goals | Apps | Goals |
|---|---|---|---|---|---|---|---|---|---|---|---|---|
| Neftçi | 2012–13 | Azerbaijan Premier League | 2 | 0 | 0 | 0 | 0 | 0 | — | | 2 | 0 |
| Neftçi | 2014–15 | Azerbaijan Premier League | 9 | 0 | 0 | 0 | 0 | 0 | — | | 9 | 0 |
| Neftçi | Total | | 11 | 0 | 0 | 0 | 0 | 0 | — | | 11 | 0 |
| Sumgayit (loan) | 2011–12 | Azerbaijan Premier League | 0 | 0 | 0 | 0 | — | | — | | 0 | 0 |
| Qarabağ (loan) | 2013–14 | Azerbaijan First Division | 8 | 0 | 3 | 0 | — | | — | | 11 | 0 |
| Eintracht Frankfurt | 2015–16 | Bundesliga | 0 | 0 | 0 | 0 | — | | 0 | 0 | 0 | 0 |
| Qarabağ | 2016–17 | Azerbaijan Premier League | 0 | 0 | 0 | 0 | 0 | 0 | — | | 0 | 0 |
| Sabail | 2017–18 | Azerbaijan Premier League | 24 | 0 | 2 | 0 | — | | — | | 26 | 0 |
| Sabail | 2018–19 | Azerbaijan Premier League | 14 | 0 | 2 | 0 | — | | — | | 16 | 0 |
| Sabail | Total | | 38 | 0 | 4 | 0 | — | | — | | 42 | 0 |
| Tobol | 2019 | Kazakhstan Premier League | 31 | 0 | 3 | 0 | 2 | 0 | — | | 36 | 0 |
| Zira | 2019–20 | Azerbaijan Premier League | 1 | 0 | — | | — | | — | | 1 | 0 |
| Qarabağ | 2020–21 | Azerbaijan Premier League | 12 | 0 | 2 | 0 | 0 | 0 | — | | 14 | 0 |
| Qarabağ | 2021–22 | Azerbaijan Premier League | 5 | 0 | 0 | 0 | 0 | 0 | — | | 5 | 0 |
| Qarabağ | Total | | 17 | 0 | 2 | 0 | 0 | 0 | — | | 19 | 0 |
| Turan | 2022 | Kazakhstan Premier League | 1 | 0 | — | | — | | — | | 1 | 0 |
| Sabail | 2022–23 | Azerbaijan Premier League | 33 | 0 | 2 | 0 | — | | — | | 35 | 0 |
| Neftçi | 2024–25 | Azerbaijan Premier League | 5 | 0 | 1 | 0 | — | | — | | 6 | 0 |
| Career total | | | 145 | 0 | 15 | 0 | 2 | 0 | 0 | 0 | 162 | 0 |

=== International ===
As of match played 27 March 2023

Appearances and goals by national team and year
| National team | Year | Apps | Goals |
|---|---|---|---|
| Azerbaijan | 2013 | 0 | 0 |
| Azerbaijan | 2014 | 0 | 0 |
| Azerbaijan | 2015 | 0 | 0 |
| Azerbaijan | 2017 | 0 | 0 |
| Azerbaijan | 2018 | 0 | 0 |
| Azerbaijan | 2019 | 5 | 0 |
| Azerbaijan | 2020 | 4 | 0 |
| Azerbaijan | 2021 | 4 | 0 |
| Azerbaijan | 2022 | 0 | 0 |
| Azerbaijan | 2023 | 1 | 0 |
| Total | | 14 | 0 |

== Honours ==
Neftchi Baku

- Azerbaijan Premier League: 2012–13
- Azerbaijan Cup: 2012–13

Araz-Naxçıvan

- Azerbaijan First Division: 2013–14

Azerbaijan

- Azerbaijan U23
- Islamic Solidarity Games: 2017

Individual

- Azerbaijani Footballer of the Year: 2019
