= Shakhruddin Magomedaliyev =

Footballer (born 1994)

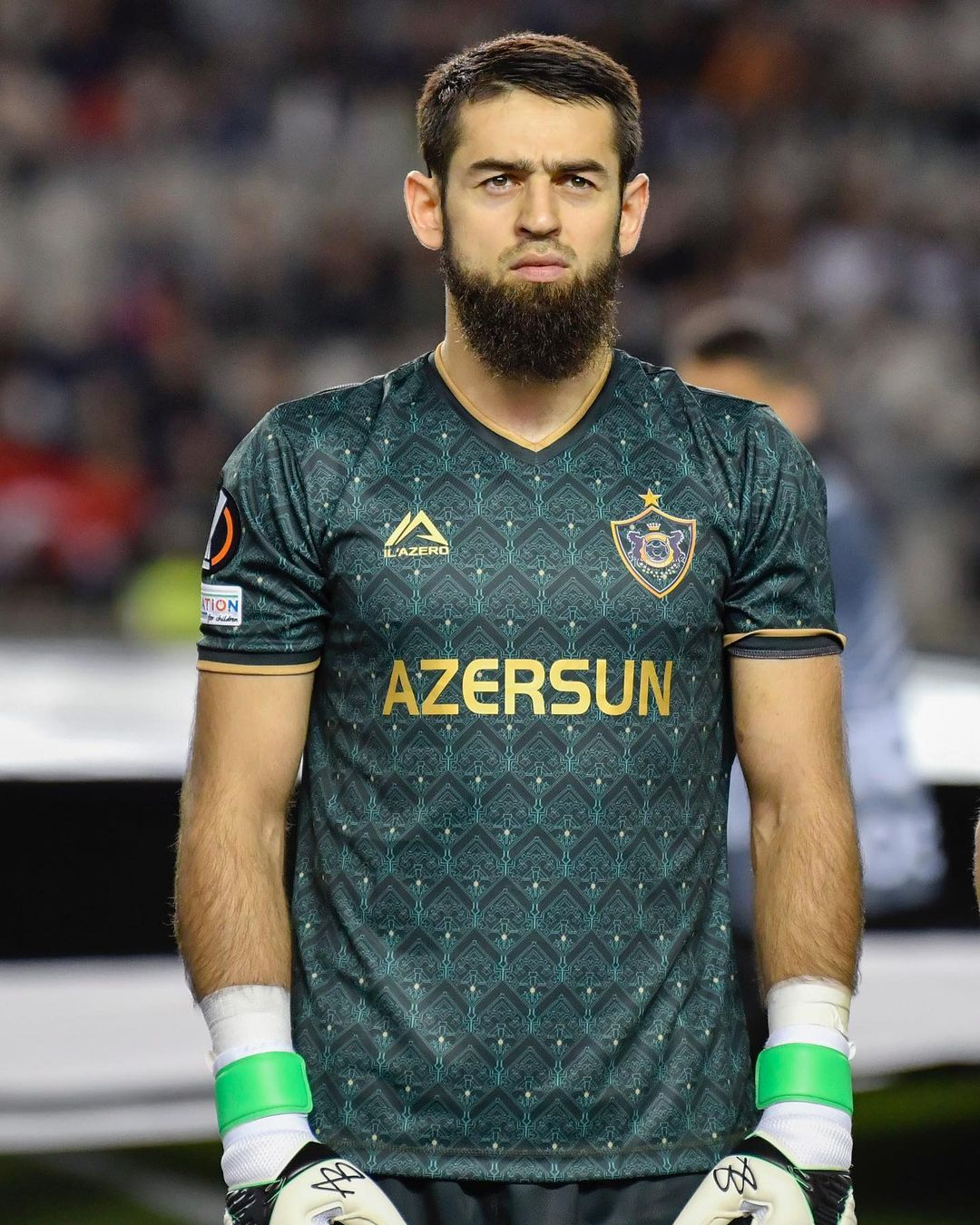
- Magomedaliyev with Qarabağ

Personal information
- Full name: Shakhruddin Magomedovich Magomedaliyev
- Date of birth: 12 June 1994 (age 32)
- Place of birth: Makhachkala, Dagestan, Russia
- Height: 1.83 m (6 ft 0 in)
- Position: Goalkeeper

Team information
- Current team: Qarabağ
- Number: 1

Youth career
- 2009–2011: Torpedo Moscow
- 2011–2012: Strogino Moscow
- 2012: Anzhi Makhachkala

Senior career*
| Years | Team | Apps | (Gls) |
| 2013 | Shahdag Qusar | 15 | (0) |
| 2014–2015 | Sumgayit | 34 | (0) |
| 2016–2023 | Qarabağ | 80 | (0) |
| 2023–2024 | Adana Demirspor | 25 | (0) |
| 2024– | Qarabağ | 17 | (0) |

International career^{‡}
| 2014–2016 | Azerbaijan U21 | 11 | (0) |
| 2017 | Azerbaijan U23 | 5 | (0) |
| 2020– | Azerbaijan | 35 | (0) |
Medal record
Men's football
Representing Azerbaijan
Islamic Solidarity Games
| Winner | 2017 Azerbaijan |
- * Club domestic league appearances and goals as of 22 June 2026 ‡ National team caps and goals as of 18:00, 16 November 2025 (UTC)

Shakhruddin Magomedovich Magomedaliyev (Azerbaijani: Şahruddin Məhəmməd oğlu Məhəmmədəliyev; Russian: Шахруддин Магомедович Магомедалиев; born 12 June 1994) is a professional footballer who plays as a goalkeeper for Azerbaijan Premier League club Qarabağ. Born in Russia, he plays for the Azerbaijan national team.

== Club career ==
On 8 February 2014, Magomedaliyev made his debut for Sumgayit in a 2–2 draw against Shuvalan in the Azerbaijan Premier League.

Magomedaliyev signed a contract with Qarabağ on 16 January 2016. He made his debut for the club on 6 February 2016 in an Azerbaijan Premier League match against Khazar Lankaran, which Qarabağ won 3–0. On 20 May 2019, he signed a new three-year contract with Qarabağ.

On 12 December 2019, Magomedaliyev made his European debut in a 1–1 draw against Luxembourgish club F91 Dudelange in the UEFA Europa League group stage.

Magomedaliyev played for Turkish club Adana Demirspor during the 2023-2024 season. On July 18, 2024, he returned to Qarabağ, signing a contract with the club until the summer of 2025.

== International career ==
Şahruddin was included in the squad of hosts Azerbaijan's under-23 team at the 2017 Islamic Solidarity Games in Baku, in which Azerbaijan went on to win the gold medal.

== Career statistics ==
As of match played 9 November 2025

Appearances and goals by club, season and competition
| Club | Season | League | | | National cup (Note: Includes Polish Cup, Azerbaijan Cup) | | Europe | | Other | | Total | |
| Club | Season | Division | Apps | Goals | Apps | Goals | Apps | Goals | Apps | Goals | Apps | Goals |
|---|---|---|---|---|---|---|---|---|---|---|---|---|
| Sumgayit | 2013–14 | Azerbaijan Premier League | 7 | 0 | — | | — | | — | | 7 | 0 |
| Sumgayit | 2014–15 | Azerbaijan Premier League | 14 | 0 | 1 | 0 | — | | — | | 15 | 0 |
| Sumgayit | 2015–16 | Azerbaijan Premier League | 13 | 0 | 0 | 0 | — | | — | | 13 | 0 |
| Sumgayit | Total | | 34 | 0 | 1 | 0 | — | | — | | 35 | 0 |
| Qarabağ | 2015–16 | Azerbaijan Premier League | 2 | 0 | 1 | 0 | — | | — | | 3 | 0 |
| Qarabağ | 2016–17 | Azerbaijan Premier League | 7 | 0 | 4 | 0 | 0 | 0 | — | | 11 | 0 |
| Qarabağ | 2017–18 | Azerbaijan Premier League | 5 | 0 | 0 | 0 | 0 | 0 | — | | 5 | 0 |
| Qarabağ | 2018–19 | Azerbaijan Premier League | 9 | 0 | 3 | 0 | 0 | 0 | — | | 12 | 0 |
| Qarabağ | 2019–20 | Azerbaijan Premier League | 10 | 0 | 0 | 0 | 1 (Note: Appearance(s) in UEFA Europa League) | 0 | — | | 11 | 0 |
| Qarabağ | 2020–21 | Azerbaijan Premier League | 18 | 0 | 2 | 0 | 9 (Note: Three Appearances in UEFA Champions League, six appearances in UEFA Europa League) | 0 | — | | 29 | 0 |
| Qarabağ | 2021–22 | Azerbaijan Premier League | 17 | 0 | 3 | 0 | 12 (Note: Appearance(s) in UEFA Conference League) | 0 | — | | 32 | 0 |
| Qarabağ | 2022–23 | Azerbaijan Premier League | 11 | 0 | 1 | 0 | 14 (Note: Six Appearances in UEFA Europa League, eight appearances in Conference League) | 0 | — | | 26 | 0 |
| Qarabağ | 2023–24 | Azerbaijan Premier League | 1 | 0 | — | | 6 (Note: Four Appearances in UEFA Champions League, two appearances in UEFA Europa League) | 0 | — | | 7 | 0 |
| Qarabağ | Total | | 80 | 0 | 14 | 0 | 42 | 0 | — | | 136 | 0 |
| Adana Demirspor | 2023–24 | Süper Lig | 25 | 0 | 0 | 0 | — | | — | | 25 | 0 |
| Qarabağ | 2024–25 | Azerbaijan Premier League | 11 | 0 | 1 | 0 | 0 | 0 | — | | 12 | 0 |
| Qarabağ | 2025–26 | Azerbaijan Premier League | 6 | 0 | 0 | 0 | 0 | 0 | — | | 6 | 0 |
| Qarabağ | 2026–27 | Azerbaijan Premier League | 0 | 0 | 0 | 0 | 0 | 0 | — | | 0 | 0 |
| Qarabağ | Total | | 17 | 0 | 1 | 0 | 0 | 0 | — | | 18 | 0 |
| Career total | | | 156 | 0 | 16 | 0 | 42 | 0 | 0 | 0 | 214 | 0 |

=== International ===
As of match played 9 June 2026

Appearances and goals by national team and year
| National team | Year | Apps | Goals |
|---|---|---|---|
Azerbaijan
| Azerbaijan | 2018 | 0 | 0 |
| Azerbaijan | 2019 | 0 | 0 |
| Azerbaijan | 2020 | 3 | 0 |
| Azerbaijan | 2021 | 8 | 0 |
| Azerbaijan | 2022 | 8 | 0 |
| Azerbaijan | 2023 | 7 | 0 |
| Azerbaijan | 2024 | 3 | 0 |
| Azerbaijan | 2025 | 6 | 0 |
| Azerbaijan | 2026 | 1 | 0 |
| Total | | 36 | 0 |

== Honours ==
Qarabağ

- Azerbaijan Premier League: 2015–16, 2016–17, 2017–18, 2018–19, 2019–20, 2021–22, 2022–23
- Azerbaijan Cup: 2015–16, 2016–17, 2021–22

Azerbaijan U23

- Islamic Solidarity Games: 2017
