= Samir Alakbarov =

Azerbaijani footballer (born 1968)

Personal information
- Full name: Samir Dadash oglu Alakbarov
- Date of birth: 8 October 1968 (age 58)
- Place of birth: Baku, Azerbaijani SSR
- Height: 1.74 m (5 ft 9 in)
- Position: Striker

Senior career*
Years	Team	Apps	(Gls)
1985	Ganclik Baku	1	(0)
1986	Karabakh Stepanakert	28	(13)
1987–1994	Neftchi Baku	191	(91)
1994–1995	Maccabi Petah Tikva	17	(1)
1995–1998	Neftchi Baku	60	(35)
1999–2001	Khazar Universiteti	28	(10)

International career
1992–1996	Azerbaijan	16	(2)

Managerial career
- 2015–2017: Azerbaijan U21 (assistant)
- 2017: Azerbaijan U21
- 2018–: Sumgayit (assistant)
- * Club domestic league appearances and goals

Samir Alakbarov (Azerbaijani: Samir Ələkbərov; born 8 October 1968, Baku) is retired football striker from Azerbaijan.

== International goals ==
#	Date	Venue	Opponent	Score	Result	Competition
1.	6 June 1993	Azadi Stadium, Tehran, Iran	Tajikistan	2-0	2-0	ECO Cup
2.	1 September 1994	Stadionul Republican, Chisinau, Moldova	Moldova	2-1	2-1	Friendly

== Honours ==
=== Individual ===
- Azerbaijani Footballer of the Year (3): 1991, 1992, 1993
- Azerbaijan Premier League Top Scorer (1): 1993
