= Rasim Abushev =

Azerbaijani footballer (born 1963)

Rasim Abuşev
Personal information
- Full name: Rasim Fərzi oğlu Abuşev
- Date of birth: 15 October 1963 (age 63)
- Place of birth: Baku, Azerbaijan SSR, Soviet Union
- Height: 1.71 m (5 ft 7 1/2 in)
- Position: Defensive midfielder

Senior career*
Years	Team	Apps	(Gls)
1985	Ganclik Baku	10	(0)
1986–1990	Neftchi Baku	86	(3)
1991	FK Qarabağ	16	(0)
1991–1993	Neftchi Baku	60	(15)
1993–1995	FK Qarabağ	41	(6)
1996	Neftchi Baku	28	(3)
1997–2002	Dynamo Stavropol	125	(19)
2002–2003	Zhemchuzhina Budyonnovsk	28	(3)
2004	FC Kavkaztransgaz	9	(0)
2004	Khazar Lankaran	1	(0)
Total		404	(49)

International career
1993–1999	Azerbaijan	40	(3)
- * Club domestic league appearances and goals

Rasim Fərzi oğlu Abuşev (born 15 October 1963) is a retired Azerbaijani professional footballer. He made his professional debut in 1985 for Ganclik Baku.

== International career ==
For Azerbaijan, Abuşev is capped 40 times, scoring 3 goals. He made his national team debut on 25 May 1993 against Georgia in friendly match. He scored his first goal on 22 March 1997 against Turkmenistan in a friendly match.

== International goals ==
#	Date	Venue	Opponent	Score	Result	Competition
1	22 March 1997	Tofiq Bahramov Stadium, Baku,	Turkmenistan	1–0	3–0	Friendly
2	26 June 1998	Viljandi linnastaadion, Viljandi,	Lithuania	1-1	2–1	Friendly
3	26 June 1998	Viljandi linnastaadion, Viljandi,	Lithuania	2-1	2–1	Friendly
