= Kamal Guliyev =

Azerbaijani footballer (born 1976)

Personal information
- Full name: Kamal Agaseyid oglu Guliyev
- Date of birth: 14 November 1976 (age 49)
- Place of birth: Sumqayit, Azerbaijani SSR
- Height: 1.84 m (6 ft 0 in)
- Position: Midfielder

Senior career*
Years	Team	Apps	(Gls)
1992–1997	Khazar Sumgayit	102	(11)
1997–2002	Neftchi Baku	109	(19)
2002–2004	Volyn Lutsk	39	(1)
2004–2005	FK Karvan	29	(0)
2005–2006	Khazar Lankaran	4	(0)
2007	FK Karvan	9	(0)
2007–2008	Standard Sumgayit	22	(0)
2008–2009	FK Karvan	17	(0)
2009–2010	Standard Sumgayit	10	(0)

International career
1999–2005	Azerbaijan	47	(0)

Managerial career
- 2011–2014: Neftchi Baku (assistant)
- 2014–2015: Neftchala
- * Club domestic league appearances and goals

Kamal Guliyev (Azerbaijani: Kamal Quliyev; born 14 November 1976) is a retired Azerbaijani international footballer.

== Honours ==
=== Manager ===
Neftchala

- Azerbaijan First Division (2): 2014–15, 2015–16
